= Peruvian political crisis (2016–present) =

Period of political instability and crisis in Peru

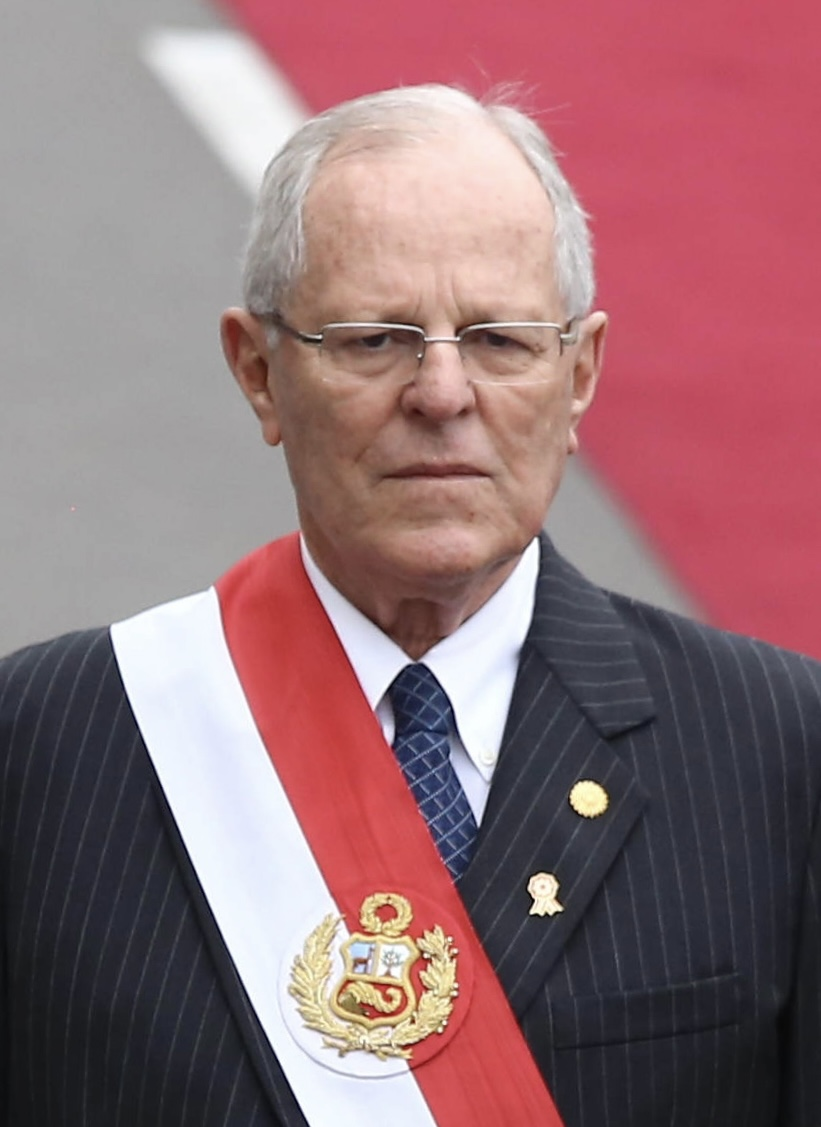
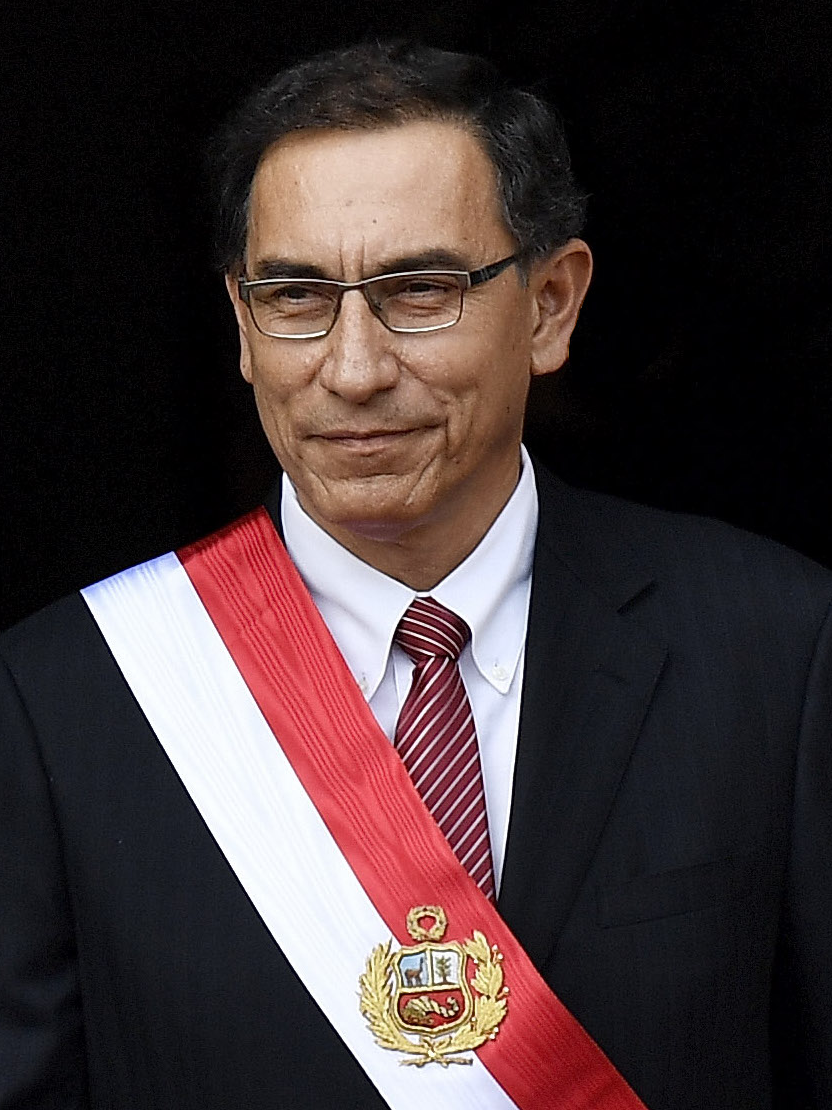
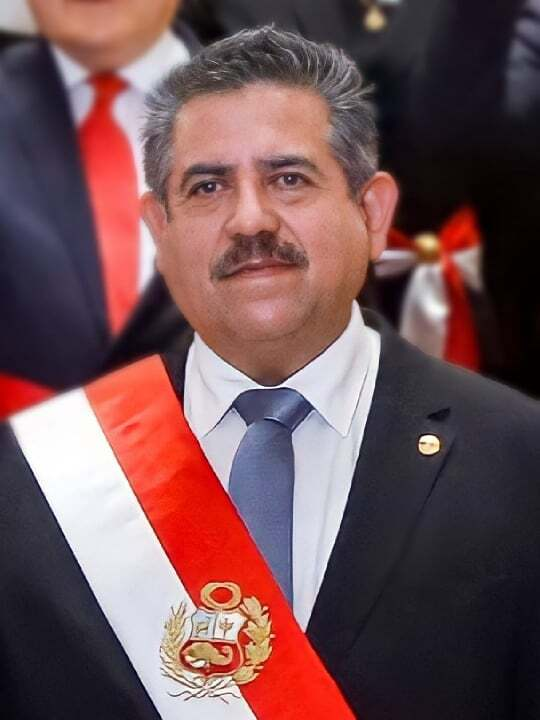
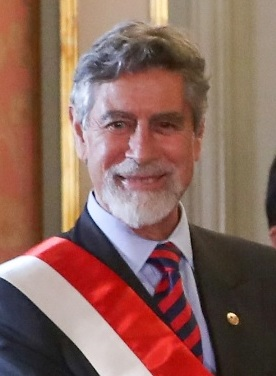
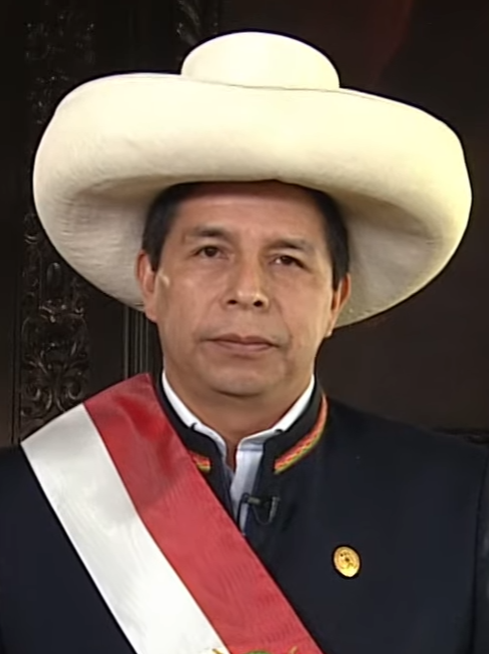
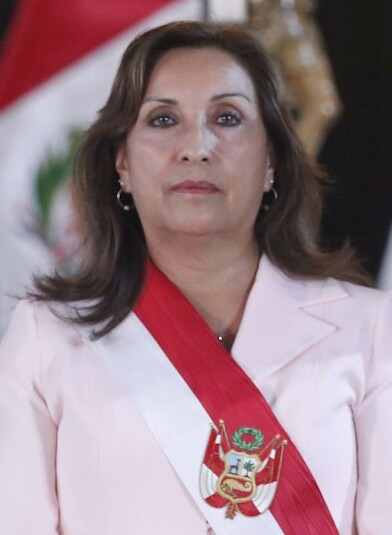
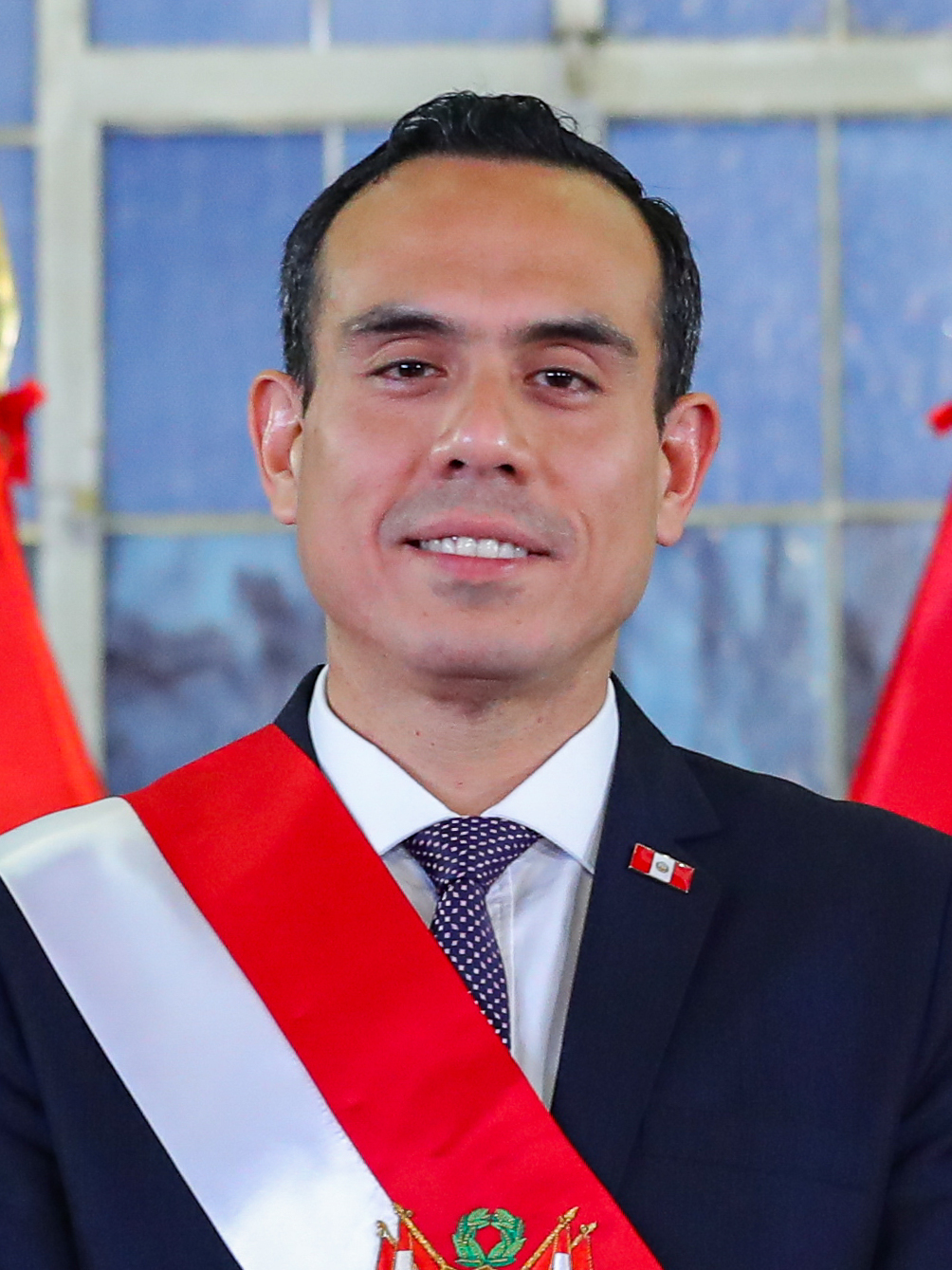
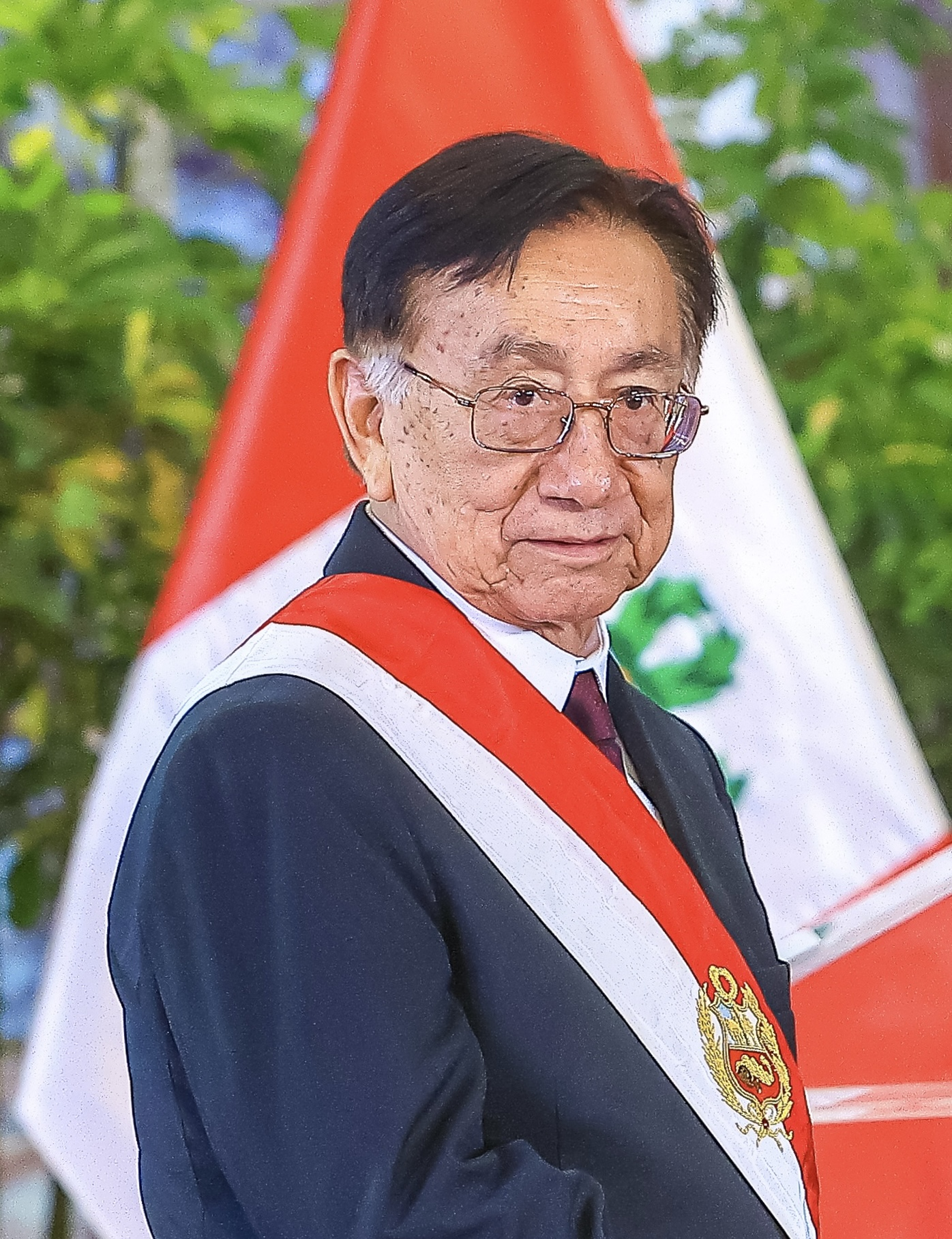
- From left to right, the 9 presidents from 2016 to 2026: Kuczynski (2016–2018), Vizcarra (2018–2020), Merino (5 days in 2020), Sagasti (2020–2021), Castillo (2021–2022), Boluarte (2022–2025), Jerí (2025–2026), Balcázar (2026) and Fujimori (2026–present)
- Date: 1st phase: 7 December 2016 – 15 November 2020 (3 years, 11 months, 1 week and 1 day); 2nd phase: 8 June 2021 – present (5 years, 5 months and 2 days)
- Location: Peru
- Caused by: Obstructionism by right-wing political parties in Congress; Lack of separation of powers within government; Endemic corruption and efforts to reform the political structure
- Status: Ongoing

Parties
First phase:
Executive branch
Kuczynski administration
(2016–2018)
Vizcarra administration
(2018–2020)
Sagasti administration
(2020–2021)
Supporting parties:
- Peruvians for Change
- Contigo
- Purple Party
- Broad Front
- Change 21 (2017-2018)
No to Keiko
Second Phase:
Castillo administration
(2021–2022)
Chamber of Deputies of Peru
(2026–present)
Anti-government protestors
- Gen-Z protestors
- Rondas campesinas
- National Coordinator for Human Rights
- No to Keiko
- Socialists
- Communists
- Ethnocacerists
Supporting parties:
- Free Peru (2021–2023)
- Together for Peru
  - Todo con el Pueblo
  - National Alliance
  - PHP (2021)
- Ahora Nación
- OBRAS
- Good Government
- Venceremos (Perú)
  - New Peru
- PCP
- Democratic People's Bloc (2022–2026)
- Bancada Socialista (2024–2026)
- Broad Front (2021)
- MOVADEF
- Various communist parties
Deface Peru
First Phase:
Merino administration
(2020)
Congress of the Republic Supporting Parties:
- Fujimorists
  - Popular Force
- Aprista Party
- Popular Action
- Alliance for Progress
- Union for Peru
- Podemos Perú
- Agricultural People's Front of Peru
Second Phase:
Boluarte administration
(2022–2025)
Jerí administration
(2025–2026)
Balcázar administration (2026)
Fujimori administration
(2026–present)
Congress of the Republic (Unicameral) (2021–2026)
Congress of the Republic (Bicameral) (2026–present)
- Senate of Peru
  (2026–present)
La Resistencia
Supreme Court of Justice
Constitutional Tribunal
National Board of Justice
Public Ministry
Ombudsman's Office
National Jury of Elections
National Office of Electoral Processes
Peruvian Armed Forces
Peruvian National Police
Supporting parties:
Democratic Bloc
- Popular Force
- Popular Renewal
- Free Peru (2023–2026)
- Advance Country (2021–2026)
- We Are Peru (2021–2026)
- Alliance for Progress (2021–2026)
- Podemos Perú (2021–2026)
- Popular Action (2021–2026)
- Honor and Democracy (2024–2026)
Aprista Party (2022–2026)
Christian People's Party
Peru Secure Homeland

Lead figures
First phase: Pedro Pablo Kuczynski; Martín Vizcarra; Mercedes Aráoz; Francisco Sagasti Second phase: Pedro Castillo	First phase: Manuel Merino Second phase: Dina Boluarte; José Jerí; José Balcázar; Keiko Fujimori

Casualties
- Charged: With corruption: Alejandro Toledo; Eliane Karp; Alan García; Ollanta Humala; Nadine Heredia; Pedro Pablo Kuczynski; Martín Vizcarra; César Hinostroza; César Villanueva; Keiko Fujimori; Kenji Fujimori; Vladimir Cerrón; Pedro Castillo; Susana Villarán; Luis Castañeda; others; With rebellion: Pedro Castillo; Aníbal Torres; Betssy Chávez; +4 officials

An ongoing long-term political crisis began in Peru during the presidency of Pedro Pablo Kuczynski in late 2016 and has substantially worsened under the rule of his various successors. The crisis has been marked by mass protests, labor strikes, corruption scandals, rising crime levels, political violence, and political instability that has led the country into a state of democratic backsliding and emerging authoritarianism.

Under Kuczynski's term, Peru had a divided government, with the Congress of the Republic being held by the right-wing opposition parties of Popular Force, led by Keiko Fujimori, and its allies. This state of division within the government led to conflict between the executive and legislative branches of government. After a series of corruption scandals and attempts to remove him, Kuczysnki resigned under major pressure in March 2018. His successor, Martín Vizcarra, led a more confrontational approach towards Congress, vowing major reforms against corruption. As a result of the conflict, Vizcarra dissolved Congress in September 2019, sparking a constitutional crisis and snap legislative elections in January 2020, which led to Popular Force losing its majority in Congress. Vizcarra would later be impeached and then removed from office in November 2020, with Congress installing Manuel Merino as president. The removal was widely categorized as a coup d'état, which led to mass protests and Merino's resignation after five days in office. He was later replaced with Francisco Sagasti.

Under Sagasti's term, general elections were held, which led to the left-wing Pedro Castillo defeating Keiko Fujimori from Popular Force in the presidential election. As a result, Fujimori and her allies attempted to overturn the election, leading to an electoral crisis and allegations of a coup. However, Castillo was nonetheless declared as winner and was inaugurated regularly. Under his term, right-wing parties returned to a majority in Congress, which led to a more divisive conflict emerging. Castillo endured major obstructionist efforts amidst his presidency. After several attempts to remove him, Castillo attempted a self-coup by illegally dissolving Congress in December 2022, which promptly led to his removal. His vice president and successor, Dina Boluarte, then allied herself with the right-wing Congress, which led to mass unrest and a widely-criticized crackdown on dissent. During her presidency, Fujimorists and their right-wing allies packed institutions and consolidated power, which led to accelerated democratic erosion. After a major security crisis emerged and further protests occurred, Boluarte was removed from office in October 2025 and replaced by José Jerí; however, protests continued under his administration. Jerí himself would be removed from office four months later for a corruption scandal that emerged after he had undisclosed meetings with Chinese businessmen. In the aftermath of the 2026 general election's first round, candidate Rafael López Aliaga made widespread allegations of electoral fraud amidst voting delays caused by ONPE, leading to an electoral crisis. The second round would be won by Fujimori, furthering the crisis as candidate Roberto Sánchez refused to concede and instead falsely claimed that electoral fraud had occurred in a similar manner to what Fujimori had done five years prior.

Throughout the crisis, many human rights organizations have criticized the government's reaction to protests, while other non-governmental organizations have warned of accelerating democratic backsliding. Nominations for the Constitutional Tribunal that lacked transparency were condemned by United States Congress members in a July 2023 letter to President Joe Biden. The United Nations has also criticized the terruqueo fearmongering tactic used by Fujimorists and the Peruvian government to paint dissidents as terrorist sympathizers. Merino's response to the 2020 protests and Castillo's response to the 2022 protests were both also criticized for use of excessive force and both were labeled as authoritarians as a result. Under the government of Dina Bolaurte, over 80 deaths were reported during protests, with an attorney from the Coordinadora Nacional de Derechos Humanos stated that the impunity rate for extrajudicial killings was "close to 100%". A wide range of human rights violations were also reported by NGOs to have been committed by the government of Boluarte, including massacres in Ayacucho and Juliaca. Boluarte's government was later labeled as "a growing militaristic government" as a result of the heavy influence of the armed forces within government and its undemocratic tendencies. The Peruvian Public Ministry controversy also revealed how independent institutions were packed with government supporters, further crushing dissent. As a result, Peru has been labeled a "failed democracy".

Political corruption has also dominated the crisis greatly, with almost all of Peru's living former presidents having been investigated or convicted of such. As a result, support for established political parties in the country has plummeted, while confidence in politicians has also fallen as a result. During their rule, Fujimorists had "earned a reputation as hardline obstructionists for blocking initiatives popular with Peruvians aimed at curbing the nation’s rampant corruption" according to the Associated Press, while another political analyst described Congress as being infiltrated by criminal organizations "that obstruct reforms to maintain their status and parliamentary immunity". Much of Peru's population also views Congress as being more focused on personal gain, vote trading, and advancing their political agenda rather than the issues facing the nation, especially corruption. Decades of economic inequality between the interior of the nation and the primate city Lima has also plagued the nation, with this inequality being attributed to both racism and endemic corruption.

== Background ==
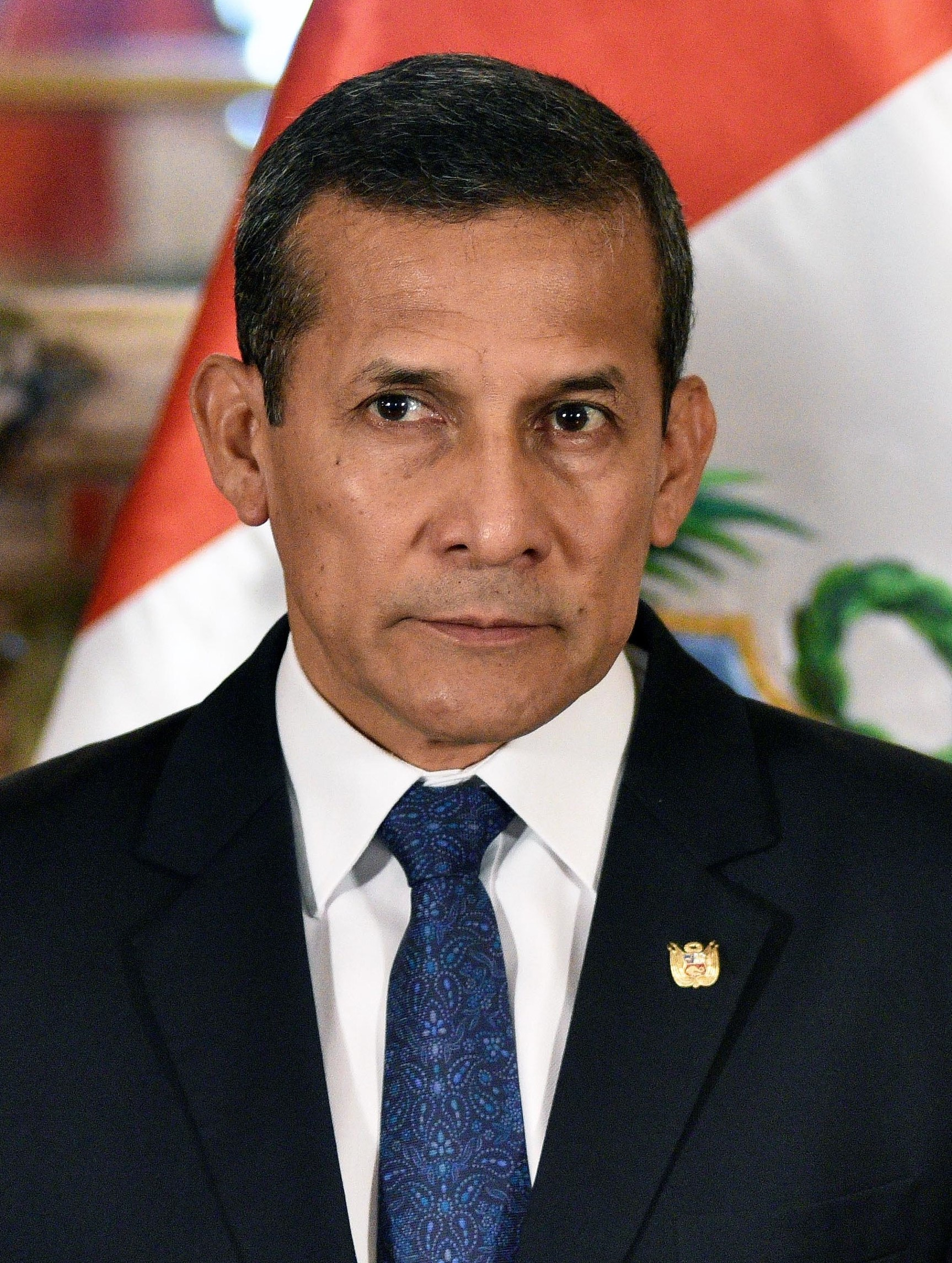
Ollanta Humala, who served a weak presidency due to the obstructionist efforts of Congress

Following the collapse of the Fujimori regime in November 2000, his political legacy was followed by his daughter Keiko Fujimori, who led the Fujimorist Popular Force party. Fujimori and her party, as well as their right-wing allies in Congress, led an obstructionist campaign during the presidency of Ollanta Humala, who led a weak presidency as a result and was essentially powerless.

The 2016 elections had some of the largest political blocs at the time, Popular Force led by Keiko Fujimori, Broad Front led by Verónika Mendoza and Peruvians for Change directed by Kuczynski. At first, it was believed that both the Congress and the Presidency would be occupied by the members of Popular Force due to their overwhelming majority; the other two parties already mentioned occupied the third and second place respectively. Mendoza (who was in third place) decided to ask her voters to support the election of the Peruvians for Change party so that she could achieve power. The objective of the Broad Front was to counteract the large number of voters who had Popular Force. This objective was half-fulfilled, since Kuczynski came to the Presidency by a narrow margin, while Popular Force managed to maintain hegemony in Congress.

In the Constitution of Peru, Article 113 allows for the removal of the President of Peru for "moral incapacity", with the measure existing since the 1839 Constitution of Peru. The term was originally meant to refer to mental disorders, and was juxtaposed to "physical incapacity". The Constitution of Ecuador notably had a similar cause for impeachment, but it was later reworded as "mental incapacity". Until 2004, there was not a concrete procedure to enact the vacancy of a president, with the Constitutional Court of Peru recommending a clarified process. In recent times, however, "moral incacapacity" had been reinterpreted as meaning literal "inmoral" behavior. As a result, Congress can basically impeach the President of Peru without cause, effectively making the legislature more powerful than the executive branch.

== Timeline ==
Results of the 2016 presidential elections by department, the colors shown are the respective of the political parties: Popular Force Broad Front Peruvians for Change Direct Democracy

=== Kuczynski presidency ===
Following the 2016 election of Pedro Pablo Kuczynski to the presidency, tensions between the PPK-led executive branch and the opposition-led congress, dominated by Fujimorists from the Popular Force (Divided government), rose. Corruption scandals plagued the government for the first year, as well as the Odebrecht scandal, national protests and strikes, and cabinet resignations.

==== Executive-Congress conflict begins ====
On 17 August 2017, members of Congress belonging to Popular Force filed a motion of interpellation against the Minister of Education Marilú Martens who was in negotiations with the representatives of the teachers, in search of the solution to a prolonged teacher strike. On 25 August, the plenary session of the Congress approved the motion of interpellation, with 79 votes in favor, 12 against and 6 abstentions. The votes in favor were from the bench of Popular Force, APRA, Broad Front and Popular Action. The date of the interpellation was set as 8 September. Martens answered a list of 40 questions, mainly about the teachers' strike that still persisted. Martens acknowledged deficiencies in facing the teachers' strike, but assured that her management would not reverse the recognition of meritocracy within the teaching profession. On 13 September, the Popular Force congresspeople announced that they would submit a motion of censure against Martens, since they claimed that she had not responded satisfactorily to the questions of the interpellation. Faced with this threat of censorship (which would be the second against a head of Education in less than a year), Prime Minister Fernando Zavala asked Congress a question of confidence for the full ministerial cabinet. Zavala's request was criticized by Congress, stating that Zavala was in solidarity with a minister who was questioned, endangering her entire cabinet, and even more, when the motion of censure had not yet been made official. It was also said that the "renewal of trust" was something that the Constitution did not contemplate. In any case, the Board of Spokespersons of the Congress summoned Zavala on 14 September to support her request for confidence. Zavala presented himself to the plenary session of the Congress with the ministers and presented his request in 12 minutes; his argument focused on the government's intention to defend the education policy that was intended, according to him, to undermine the education minister's censure. Then they proceeded to the parliamentary debate. The question of trust was debated for 7 hours and voted on 15 September. The cabinet failed to obtain the confidence of the Parliament, which voted against the confidence with 77, which produced the total crisis of the cabinet.

On 17 September, Second Vice President Mercedes Aráoz was sworn in as president of the Council of Ministers of Peru and with this, five new ministers were announced: Claudia Cooper Fort (Economy), Idel Vexler (Education), Enrique Mendoza Ramírez (Justice and Human Rights), Fernando d'Alessio (Health) and Carlos Bruce (Housing). The new head of the cabinet was sworn in with the 18 ministers in a ceremony held in the Court of Honor of the Government Palace. On 6 October, the vote of confidence was given and if it were to fail, the president would have the right to dissolve Congress and call new elections, as the Constitution of 1993 said. The vote of confidence was delayed until 12 October, beginning with the exhibitions of the new cabinet led by Aráoz and subsequent intervention of the different political caucuses of the Congress until the next day. It resulted in 83 votes in favor and 17 against.

Many political figureheads such as the media reported on the denial of confidence in the first cabinet; journalist Rosa María Palacios sent a message to the president asking him to dissolve the Congress and warned that "Fujimorism has been trapped. Journalist César Hildebrandt also sent a message to the president saying that "the country requires him to confront the Fujimorist Congress". A former constitutional lawyer in an interview said that the former president of the Council of Ministers Fernando Zavala "is sacrificing for state policies", the former president of the Council of Ministers Pedro Cateriano warned that "Keiko Fujimori, leader of the Popular Force party, wants to lead a coup d'etat".

On 15 November, through Bill No. 2133, Congressman Mauricio Mulder presented the Mulder Law, which prohibited state advertising in private media and on 28 February 2018 approved the bill by the Permanent Commission of the Congress with 20 in favor, 3 against and 14 abstentions. The ruling was approved at the urging of APRA and Fujimorism on 15 June 2018 with 70 votes in favor, 30 against and 7 abstentions. and it was published on 18 June 2018 in the Legal Rules of the Official Gazette El Peruano.

In November 2017, the Lava Jato Commission, a congressional commission chaired by Rosa Bartra investigating Odebrecht and its activities in Peru, as well as the concurrent scandal, received confidential information that President Kuczynski had had labor ties with this company, which went back to the time when he was both Prime Minister and the Minister of the Economy between 2004 and 2006, under the government of Alejandro Toledo, despite the fact that since the outbreak of the Odebrecht case, Kuczynski had denied him on several occasions.

The Commission then asked the Odebrecht company for details of its relationship with Kuczynski, which were publicly disclosed on 13 December. It was revealed then that Westfield Capital, an investment banking advisory firm, founded and directed by Kuczynski had carried out seven consultancies for Odebrecht between November 2004 and December 2007 for millions of dollars, that is, coinciding with the time when Kuczynski had been Minister of Economy (2004–2005) and Prime Minister (2005–2006). The information also revealed that another company closely related to Kuczynski, First Capital, formed by its Chilean partner Gerardo Sepúlveda, had also provided consulting services for Odebrecht between 2005 and 2013.

==== First attempted impeachment ====
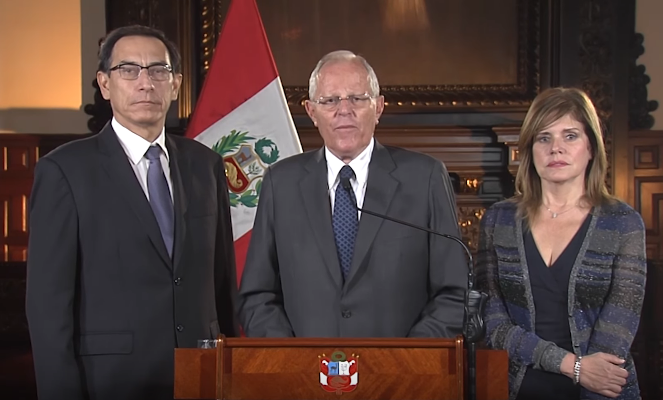
Pedro Pablo Kuczynski next to his vice-presidents, Martín Vizcarra and Mercedes Aráoz, a speech prior to his first impeachment vote.

The opposition, led by Popular Force, demanded the resignation of Pedro Pablo Kuczynski and threatened his impeachment if he did not do so. The Broad Front support holding an immediate impeachment vote. On 14 December, Kuczynski, through a message to the nation, denied the accusations and said he would not resign his position.

I am here to tell you: I am not going to abdicate my honor or my values or my responsibilities as president of all Peruvians,

— Pedro Pablo Kuczynski

In his defense, he claimed to have no relationship with the company First Capital, which was the sole property of Sepúlveda, and that only one of the payments mentioned had to do with him, the one dated in 2012, when he no longer held any ministerial positions. As for Westfield Capital, although he acknowledged that it was his sole proprietorship, he affirmed that he was never under his direction and administration while he was Prime Minister, and that the contracts dated at that time had been signed by Sepúlveda, his partner. He also noted that all payments to his company were legal, and that they were duly registered, billed and banked. Kuczunski's explanations did not convince the opposition, and he was accused of continuing to lie, especially in relation to the fact that he had left Westfield Capital when he was minister, when, according to public records, he always figured as director of that company. Although PPK argued that there had been a "Chinese wall", an expression used in business to refer to when the partner or owner has no contact or receive information on the management of the company, while in public office (but in the case of Wesfield Capital, being a company where Kuczynski was its sole agent, it is unclear how this "Chinese wall" could be made). Faced with the refusal of the president to resign, several of the opposition caucuses of Congress then proposed to submit their position to the vacancy.

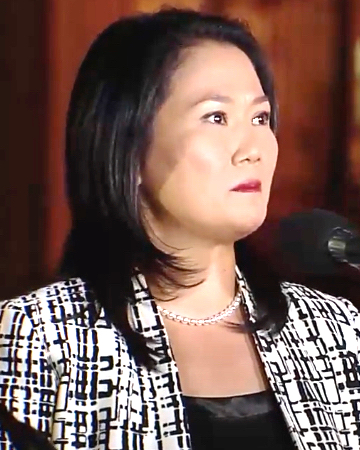
Keiko Fujimori, de facto leader of the opposition, in July 2017

The Broad Front submitted a motion for the vacancy request to be debated in the plenary session of the Congress. The congresspersons of Popular Force, APRA and the Alliance for Progress joined the request and the motion surpassed more than the 26 signatures needed to proceed with the process. Once the motion was approved, the debate began on 15 December and lasted until later that day. The opposition legislators who introduced the motion cited a moral incapacity when they denounced that the president lied in the statements he gave about his ties with Odebrecht. The congresspeople demanded that the due process be followed, reproaching the fact that the opposition proceeded with unusual speed and that several of its members had already decided to empty the president without having heard his defense. They also questioned the fact that a single report from Odebrecht was considered sufficient evidence, thereby overtly dispensing with the investigation that demanded such a delicate and far-reaching case.

According to the regulations, the vote of 40% of competent congressmen was needed for the admission of the vacancy request. As 118 congressmen were present, only 48 votes were needed, which was widely exceeded, as they voted 93 in favor and 17 against; these last ones were, in their great majority, those of the pro-government caucus.

Once the vacancy request was approved, the Congress agreed that on 21 December, Kuczynski should appear before the plenary session of the Congress to make his disclaimers; then it would proceed to debate and finally vote to decide the presidential vacancy, needed for this 87 votes of the total of 130 congressmen.

On the appointed day, Kuczynski went to Congress to exercise his defense, accompanied by his lawyer Alberto Borea Odría. The defense began with the speech of the president himself, in which he denied having committed any act of corruption. Then came Borea's defense, which had as its axis the consideration that the vacancy request was an exaggeration because you could not accuse a president of the Republic without demonstrating with irrefutable evidence his "permanent moral incapacity", a concept that the congressmen did not they had apparently very clear, because strictly the constitutional precept would be referring to a mental incapacity. He considered that the offenses or imputed crimes had to be ventilated first in the investigating commission, before drawing hasty conclusions. He also rejected that PPK has repeatedly lied about his relationship with Odebrecht (argument that the Fujimoristas used to justify their permanent moral incapacity), because the facts in question had happened twelve years ago and he did not have to have them present in detail.

After the speech of Borea, the congressional debate that lasted fourteen hours began. Voting for the vacancy took place after eleven o'clock at night, with the following result: 78 votes in favor, 19 against and 21 abstentions. One of the benches, New Peru, retired before the voting, because to say of its members they did not want to follow the game to Fujimorism. Since 87 votes were needed to proceed with the vacancy, this was dismissed. The whole Popular Force bench voted in favor of the vacancy, with the exception of 10 of its members, led by Kenji Fujimori, who abstained, and who thus decided the result. The rumor spread that this dissident group, which would later be called the "Avengers", had negotiated its votes with the government in exchange for the presidential pardon in favor of Alberto Fujimori, its historical leader who was then imprisoned. After the Popular Force bench and led by Kenji announced the formation of a new political group named Cambio 21, which would support the government.

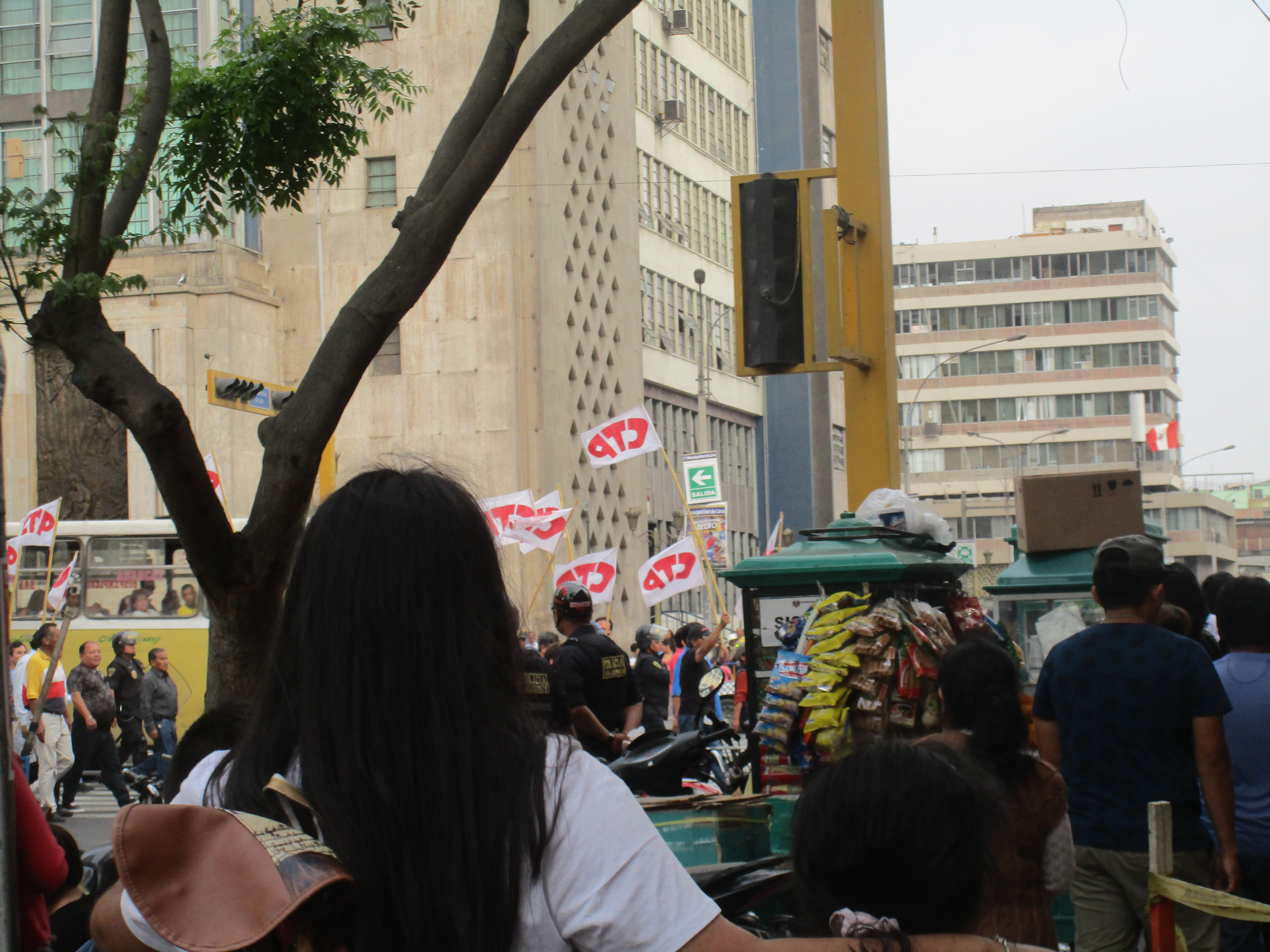
A protest against Kuczynski's pardon of Alberto Fujimori, 28 December 2017

On 24 December 2017, Kuczynski granted a humanitarian pardon to Alberto Fujimori, who had been imprisoned for 12 years, with a sentence of 25 years for crimes of human rights violations committed during the Shining Path insurgency. The government assured that the pardon had been decided for purely humanitarian reasons, in view of the various physical ills afflicting the former president of the Republic, confirmed by reports of a medical board. However, a strong suspicion arose that the pardon would have been the result of a furtive pact of the Kuczynski government with the sector of the Fujimorist bloc that had abstained during the vote for the presidential vacancy and that had thus prevented it from concrete this. The pardon also motivated the resignation of the official congressmen Alberto de Belaunde, Vicente Zeballos and Gino Costa; of the Minister of Culture Salvador del Solar and Minister of Defense Jorge Nieto Montesinos. The Minister of the Interior, Carlos Basombrío Iglesias, had already resigned. There were also several marches in Lima and throughout the county of the country in protest of the pardon.

Alberto Fujimori, who days before the pardon had been admitted to a clinic for complications in his health, was discharged on 4 January 2018 and so could, for the first time, move freely. President Kuczynski, meanwhile, formed a new ministerial cabinet, which he called "the Cabinet of Reconciliation," which according to him, should mark a new stage in the relationship between the Executive and the Legislative. Mercedes Aráoz held the post of Prime Minister, while eight ministerial changes were made, the most important renewal in what was going on in the government.

==== Second impeachment and resignation ====
Only days after the first attempt at a presidential vacancy, in January 2018, the Broad Front caucus filed a new vacancy request, alleging Alberto Fujimori's pardon, which allegedly had been negotiated and granted illegally. This did not prosper, given the lack of support from Fuerza Popular, whose votes were necessary to carry out such an initiative. Under that experience, the leftist groups of Broad Front and Nuevo Peru promoted another vacancy motion, concentrating exclusively on the Odebrecht case, arguing that new indications of corruption and conflict of interest had been discovered by PPK when he was Minister of State in the government of Alejandro Toledo. This time they won the support of Fuerza Popular, as well as other groups like Alianza para el Progreso (whose spokesperson, César Villanueva, was the main promoter of the initiative), thus gathering the 27 minimum votes necessary to present a multiparty motion before the Congress of the Republic, what was done on 8 March 2018.

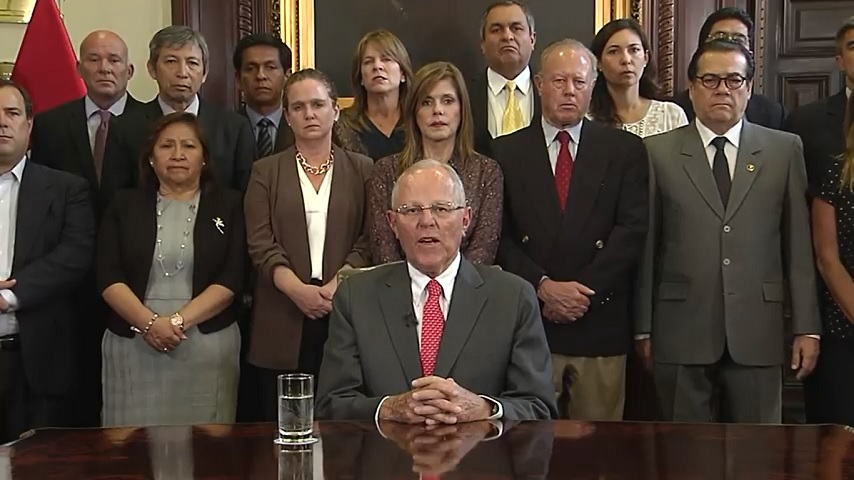
President Pedro Pablo Kuczynski resigning the presidency on 21 March 2018

On 15 March, the admission of this motion was debated in the plenary session of the Congress, the result being 87 votes in favor, 15 votes against and 15 abstentions. The motion received the backing of all the benches, except for Peruvians for Change and non-grouped congressmen, among them, the three former pro-government officials and the Kenji Fujimori bloc. The Board of Spokespersons scheduled the debate on the presidential vacancy request for 22 March. A confidential report from the Financial Intelligence Unit (FIU) on the money movements of Kuczynski's bank accounts was forwarded to the Public Ministry and the Lava Jato Commission of Congress, but inexplicably leaked to public knowledge. This 33-page document revealed that from the companies and consortiums linked Odebrecht transfers had been made to Westfield Capital, the one-person Kuczynski company, for millions. Transfers made to the account of the driver of Kuczynski and that of Gilbert Violeta were also revealed, although it was shown that these were only payments of a labor nature and of basic services. The leak of this report, which is presumed to have been made by the Lava Jato Commission chaired by Rosa Bartra, would have been with the intention of further identifying the credibility of the President of the Republic.

On 20 March 2018, Popular Force showed evidence that the government was buying the support of congressmen to vote against the second presidential vacancy request, a rumor that had already circulated during the first process. It was a set of videos where the conversations made by the legislators Bienvenido Ramírez and Guillermo Bocángel (from the bench of Kenji Fujimori) to try to convince Congressman Moisés Mamani of Puno not to join to support the presidential vacancy, in exchange for works for his represented region. In one of the videos, Kenji Fujimori is seen in a meeting with Mamani, which also includes Bienvenido Ramírez. The latter makes a series of offers to the parliamentarian from Puno to enable him to streamline projects for his region, in exchange for joining his group and supporting Kuczynski. In another video we see Bocángel talking about the administrative control of the Congress, once they access the Board. And in a third video, we see Alberto Borea Odría, PPK's lawyer on the subject of vacancy, explaining to Mamani about aspects of that process and giving him the telephone number of a minister of state. Those involved in the scandal, came out to defend themselves, saying that it was normal practice for congressmen to turn to ministers to ask for works in favor of their regions. Congressman Bienvenido even said that he had only "bragged". But what was questioned was the fact that the government negotiated these works to reorient the vote of a group of congressmen on the issue of the presidential vacancy, which would constitute the criminal figure of influence peddling. A few hours later, Fujimorists gave the final thrust, by broadcasting a set of audios, in which the Minister of Transport and Communications, Bruno Giuffra is heard offering works to Mamani in exchange for his vote to avoid the vacancy. The press highlighted a phrase by Giuffra in which he says: "Comrade, you know what the nut is and what you are going to get out", presumably referring to the benefits Mamani would gain if he voted against the vacancy. Until then, it was expected that the vote to achieve the vacancy would be very tight and that even Kuczynski could again succeed as had happened in the first process. But the Kenjivideos determined that several congressmen who until then had manifested their abstention (among them the three ex- oficialistas) folded in favor of the vacancy, and thus they made it known openly.

Faced with the foreseeable scenario that awaited him in the debate scheduled for the Congress on the 22nd, PPK opted to renounce the Presidency of the Republic, sending the respective letter to Congress, and giving a televised message to the Nation, which was transmitted in the afternoon of 21 March.

I think the best thing for the country is for me to renounce the Presidency of the Republic. I do not want to be a stumbling block for our nation to find the path of unity and harmony that is so badly needed and denied to me. I do not want the country or my family to continue suffering with the uncertainty of recent times (...) There will be a constitutionally ordered transition.

— Kuczynski, in his message of resignation to the Presidency of the Republic. Lima, 21 March 2018.

The Board of Spokespersons of the Congress, although rejected the terms of the letter of resignation of Kuczynski, arguing that this did not make any self-criticism and victimized, accepted the same and scheduled for 22 March a debate in Congress to evaluate the resignation. That debate lasted until the next day. Although a section of congressmen on the left argued that the resignation of Kuczynski should not be accepted and that Congress should proceed to vacancy due to moral incapacity, the majority of congressmen considered that it should be accepted, to put an end to the crisis. When the preliminary text of the resolution of the Congress was published, in which it was indicated that the president had "betrayed the fatherland", Kuczynski announced that it would withdraw its letter of resignation if that qualification was maintained. The Board of Spokesmen decided then to omit that expression. The resignation was accepted with 105 votes in favor, 12 against and 3 abstentions. Moments later, the first vice-president Martín Vizcarra was sworn in as the new constitutional president of the Republic. Soon after, the new government announced that its prime minister would be César Villanueva, the main promoter for Kuczynski's vacancy.

=== Vizcarra presidency ===
==== Anti-corruption initiative ====
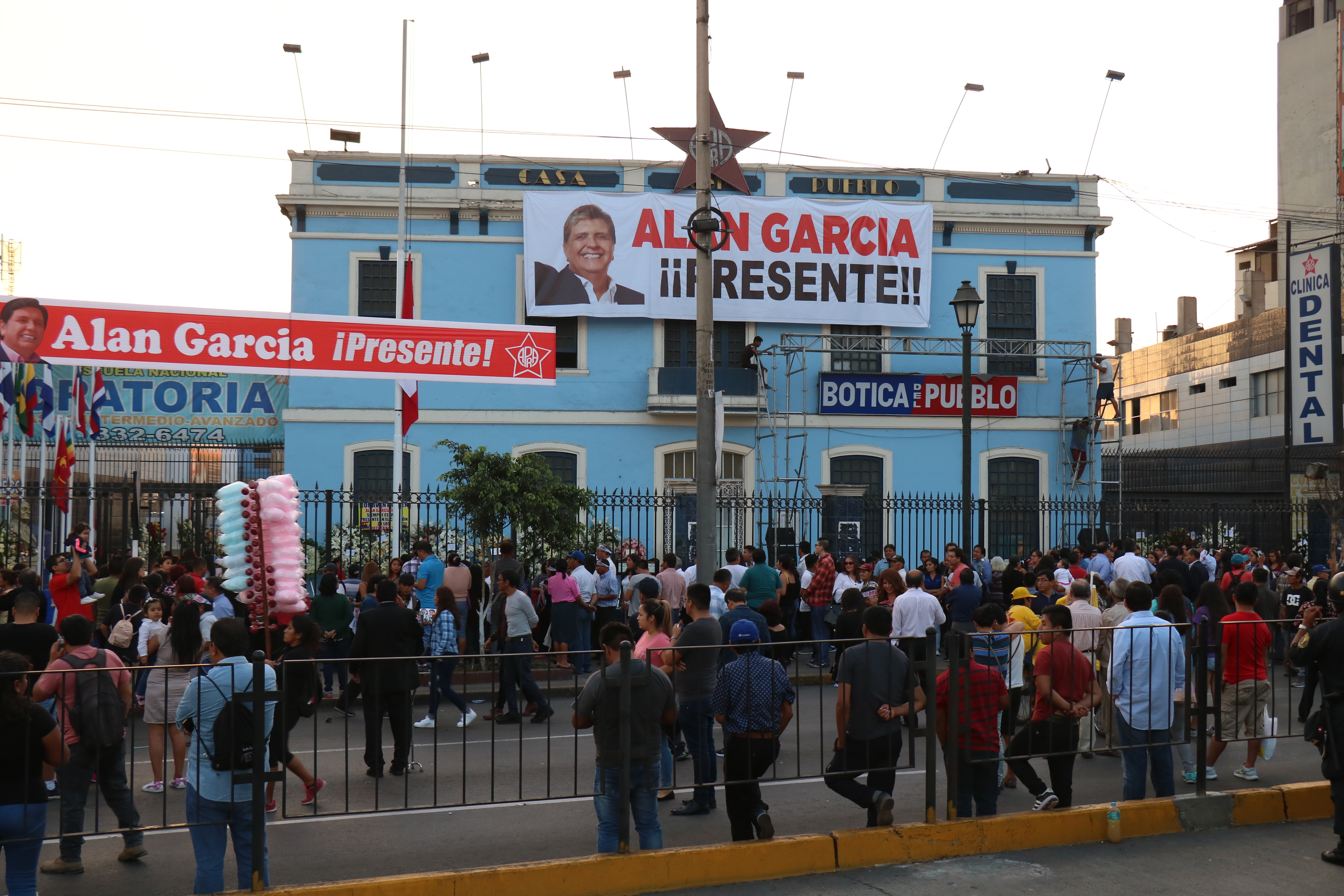
APRA sympathizers gathered after the suicide of Alan García. The compelling evidence and accusations against him revealed in the Odebrecht case forced him to take his own life.

On 28 July 2018, following multiple corruption scandals facing the Peruvian government such as the Cuellos Blancos scandal, President Vizcarra called for a nationwide referendum to prohibit private funding for political campaigns, ban the reelection of lawmakers and to create a second legislative chamber. The Washington Post stated that "Vizcarra's decisive response to a graft scandal engulfing the highest tiers of the judiciary ... has some Peruvians talking of a once-in-a-lifetime opportunity to restore integrity to public life and revive citizens’ waning faith in democracy". Leftist lawmaker Marisa Glave, who was once a critic of Vizcarra, praised the move saying he had "connected with the people in a society that is both fed up with corruption but also deeply apolitical. It has put the Fujimoristas in check". Transparency International also praised the move, stating that "This is a very important opportunity, one that is unlike previous opportunities because, in part, the president appears genuinely committed".

On 3 October, the Judicial Branch issued placement and arrest warrants against former President Alberto Fujimori. His lawyers had 5 days (from 4 October) to support an appeal. On 9 October, the appeal filed by his lawyers was rejected. Next, the judge ordered to locate him and capture him, an end of the sea re-entered in a prison.

I want to tell the authorities and politicians today, because I no longer have the strength to resist it. (...) I want to ask the President of the Republic, the members of the Judiciary, only one thing: please do not kill me. If I go back to prison, my heart will not endure it, it is too weak to be able to go through the same. Do not condemn me to death, I do not give more "

— Alberto Fujimori, at the Centenario clinic, where he was interned, on 5 October 2018.

As a result of the annulment of the pardon, the legislators at the end of Fujimorism, would approve a series of reforms.

On 10 October, in the Office of the Prosecutor of Peru, Judge Richard Concepción Carhuancho ordered a preliminary detention of Keiko Fujimori for 10 days, for the alleged illicit contributions to the 2011 campaign from Odebrecht.

The Office of the Prosecutor does not cite any evidence in the judicial decision. A person is given preliminary detention when there is a well-founded risk, or a well-founded suspicion, of a procedural danger. What is the danger if we are going to the Attorney's office voluntarily? What is the risk of flight?

— Defense of Keiko Fujimori at the time of the arrest.

On 17 October, after an appeal, Fujimori was released, along with five other detainees, because no feasible evidences of her responsibility were found.

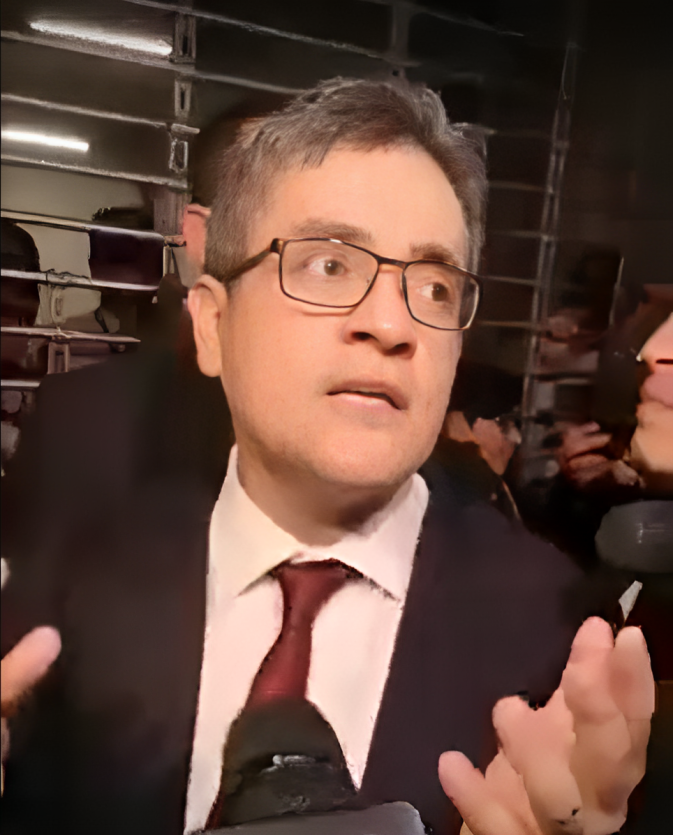
José Domingo Pérez, one of the key prosecutors investigating the Odebrecht case in Peru, opened proceedings against various political leaders and businessmen.

On 15 November 2018, Alan García went to a meeting with the prosecution of money laundering, as part of an interrogation, carried out by, part of the prosecutor José Domingo Pérez due to irregularities in the conference payments of the former president, financed with money from Caja 2 of the structured operations division of the Odebrecht company, before this the prosecutor issued an order to prevent him from leaving the country for 18 months for García, even though at first he said he was at the disposition of the justice, that same night he went to the home of Carlos Alejandro Barros, ambassador of Uruguay, where he remained until 3 December 2018, when Uruguayan President Tabaré Vázquez, announced the rejection of Alan García's asylum request, consider that in Peru the three branches of the state functioned freely and without political persecution. Garcia committed suicide four months later, only moments after being personally presented with a ten-day preliminary arrest.

On 9 December, Peruvians ultimately accepted three of four of the proposals in the referendum, only rejecting the final proposal of creating a bicameral congress when Vizcarra withdrew his support when the Fujimorista-led congress manipulated the proposals contents which would have removed power from the presidency.

On 21 December, the government formalized the formation of the High Level Commission for Political Reform. It was made up of political scientist Fernando Tuesta Soldevilla, as coordinator, and academics Paula Valeria Muñoz Chirinos, Milagros Campos Ramos, Jessica Violeta Bensa Morales and Ricardo Martin Tanaka Dongo. It was installed on 5 January 2019. Based on the report that said Commission gave, the government presented twelve proposals for political reform to Congress (11 April 2019). However, it excluded the issue of bicamerality, as it was recently rejected in the referendum.

Among the three projects of constitutional reform was the one that sought the balance between the Executive and Legislative powers with the objective of establishing counterweights between both; the reform that modifies the impediments to be a candidate for any position of popular election, to improve the suitability of the applicants; and the reform that seeks to extend the regional and municipal mandate to five years, to coincide with the general elections. For the Legislative Branch, it was proposed that the election of the congressmen be carried out in the second presidential round; the elimination of the preferential vote and the establishment of parity and alternation in the list of candidates were proposed. On the other hand, for political parties, the aim was to promote internal democracy and citizen participation in the selection of candidates, establishing internal, open, simultaneous and compulsory elections organized by the ONPE. Other reforms related to the registration and cancellation in the registry of political organizations, and the requirements to keep the registration in force, as well as the regulation of the financing of political organizations, to avoid corruption. Another proposal was that the lifting of parliamentary immunity should not be the responsibility of Congress, but of the Supreme Court of Justice.

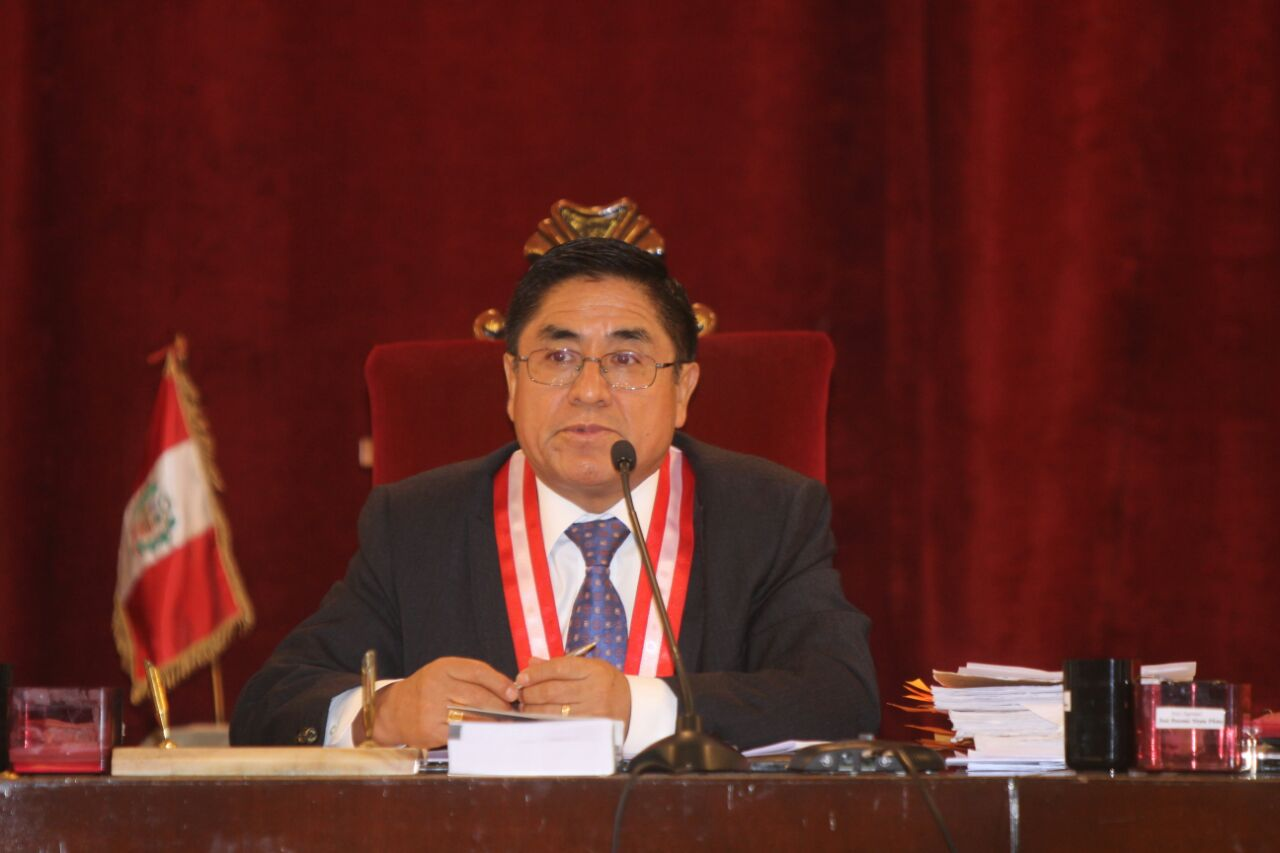
Supreme judge César Hinostroza fled the country in July 2018 after being involved in the Cuellos Blancos scandal. Several audio recordings revealed a corruption scheme involving bribes to reduce sentences.

On 23 January 2019 Alberto Fujimori was transferred again to the Barbadillo prison in the Ate District, where he was interned from 2007 to 2017, serving his sentence before being pardoned. The former president was discharged from the Centennial Clinic after a medical board of the Institute of Legal Medicine evaluated him and determined that he is stable and that he can receive treatment for his ailments.

After a 3-day hearing, on 19 April, the Judiciary issued a sentence of 36 months of pre-trial detention for former President Pedro Pablo Kuczynski. However, due to illness, on 27 April he was exchanged for house arrest.

On 29 May, from the Great Hall of the Government Palace, President Vizcarra gave a message to the Nation, in which he announced his decision to raise the issue of trust before Congress in support of political reform. This, after the Constitution Commission, with a Fujimori majority, sent the bill on parliamentary immunity to the archive, and the Permanent Commission, also with a Fujimori majority, filed practically all the complaints weighing on the controversial prosecutor Chávarry. The president, accompanied by members of his ministerial cabinet and regional governors, stated that the issue of trust would be based on the approval, without violating its essence, of six of the bills for political reform, considered the most central:

- Changes in parliamentary immunity, so that it does not become impunity.
- Convicted persons may not be candidates.
- Any citizen must participate in the selection of candidates from political organizations, through internal primary elections.
- Eliminate the preferential vote and let the population define it in that previous selection.
- Guarantee the political participation of women with parity and alternation.
- Prohibit the use of dirty money from electoral campaigns.

If Congress denied the issue of confidence, it would be the second time that it did (the previous one went to the Zavala cabinet of the government of Pedro Pablo Kuczynski), for which, according to the Constitution, faced with two refusals, the President would be empowered to dissolve Congress and call new parliamentary elections within four months.

The following day, Prime Minister Salvador del Solar appeared before Congress to deliver the official letter requesting that the time and date of the plenary session be established, in which he will support the issue of trust. In this document, Del Solar indicated that he would propose that the maximum term for the approval of the six political reforms be at the end of the current legislature (15 June); otherwise, it would consider that Congress denied confidence to the ministerial cabinet. In response to the request, Congress President Daniel Salaverry called the plenary session for 4 June to meet the Executive's request for confidence.

The six political reform projects were defined as follows:

- Constitutional reform that states that those convicted in the first instance may not be candidates.
- Legislative reform on internal democracy, which seeks for citizens to participate in the selection of candidates from political organizations, through internal primary elections.
- Legislative reform that seeks to guarantee women's political participation, with parity and alternation, as well as eliminating preferential voting.
- Legislative reform on registration and cancellation of political parties and regional political organizations.
- Legislative reform that seeks to prohibit the use of illegal money in electoral campaigns.
- Constitutional reform to make changes in the process of lifting parliamentary immunity, so that it does not become impunity.

The Constitution Commission invited jurists Raúl Ferrero Costa, Natale Amprimo, Ernesto Álvarez, Aníbal Quiroga and Óscar Urviola to collect their opinions on the Executive's approach and the constitutionality of the approach.

On 4 June, Salvador del Solar appeared in the plenary session of Congress to expose and request the question of trust before the national representation. Previously, a previous question was rejected to evaluate the constitutionality of the trust request. Several voices in Congress considered that imposing a deadline for the approval of constitutional reforms and forcing their essence to be respected was unconstitutional, since reforms of this type were the exclusive responsibility of Congress and the Executive lacked the power to observe them. Due to these criticisms, Del Solar, in his presentation, lightened that part of his demand. He said that Congress was empowered to extend the legislature if necessary, and that it was not obliged to approve the bills to the letter, but could enrich them, although insisting that they should not alter their essence. "This question of trust is not a threat," he concluded.

After the presentation of the Prime Minister, the parliamentary debate began, which had to be extended until the following day. Finally, at noon on 5 June 2019, the vote was held. The question was approved with 77 votes in favor, 44 against and 3 abstentions. The members of the left-wing benches (Broad Front and New Peru) and the Aprista Party voted against, while those of Popular Force did so in a divided manner (33 in favor, 16 against and 2 abstentions).

The Constitution commission debated the opinions between 7 June and 20 July. A series of changes were made in the projects, but the most striking was what was committed with the latest opinion, on the lifting of immunity of parliamentarians. The Constitution Commission rejected the Executive's proposal that the Supreme Court be in charge of raising immunity for congressmen, providing that Congress continue to retain that prerogative. The only variant was that it proposed definite terms for Congress to lift immunity once the Judicial Power made the respective request. In addition, it was proposed that the request be given only when there is a final judgment.

When the Prime Minister Salvador del Solar was consulted on the opinions approved by the Constitution Commission, he considered that only five respected the spirit of the reforms proposed by the Executive, and that the last one, on parliamentary immunity, meant a setback, since it did not respect the a matter of trust, which had arisen precisely when the Constitution Commission sent the same project to the archive.

The six projects were submitted to the plenary session of Congress, were approved between 22 and 25 July, including modifications that further accentuated the distortion of the original projects of the Executive, especially regarding internal democracy and parliamentary immunity.

Daniel Salaverry, elected president of Congress for the 2018–2019 legislature with the support of his Popular Force colleagues, starred in a series of confrontations with his colleagues, marked by a series of epithets, attempts at censorship and accusations, which led him to distance himself of Popular Force and approach President Vizcarra, who saw him as an ally to curb the dominance of Keiko Fujimori in Congress. This earned him retaliation from his former colleagues. An investigation of the television program Panorama denounced that Salaverry had repeatedly presented false data in his representation week reports (an obligation that congressmen have to visit the provinces they represent, to listen to the demands of their constituents), which included photos from other events.

On 28 May 2020, Prime Minister Vicente Zeballos went to request the vote of confidence with his cabinet. He obtained 89 votes in favor, 35 against, and 4 abstentions.

On 1 July, the Union for Peru bench presented a motion to interpellate Zeballos and the Minister of Justice, Fernando Castañeda, stating that urgent responses were required to the problems of public health, economic reactivation and corruption.45 As In response, the prime minister argued that although he respected the autonomy of Congress and both he and his ministers would continue to attend the summons issued by the different commissions, he considered that these motions (six in total, together with those previously presented against the heads of Economy, Health, Education and Development and Social Inclusion) did not add efforts to the fight against the coronavirus pandemic; but on the contrary, they sought to hinder the work of the Executive or to gain prominence.

==== Dissolution of Congress ====
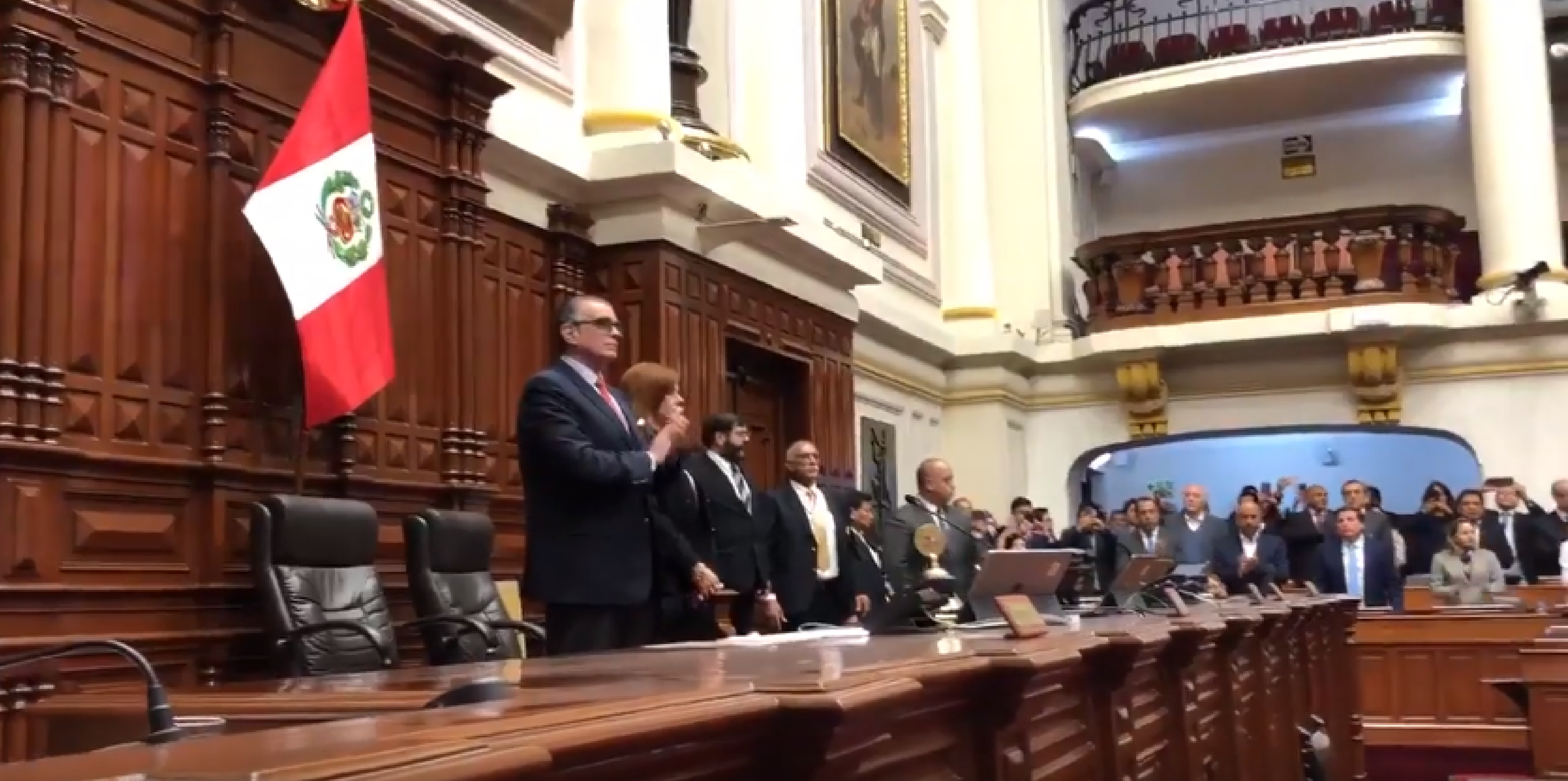
The proclamation of Mercedes Aráoz as president by Congress, after refusing to accept the parliament's dissolution.

Demanding reforms in the Constitutional Court organic law, President Vizcarra called for a vote of no confidence on 27 September 2019, stating it was "clear the democracy of our nation is at risk". Vizcarra and the Inter-American Commission on Human Rights criticized Congress for blocking a proposal for general elections while it quickly approved nominations to the Constitutional Court of Peru without investigating the backgrounds on nominees. Vizcarra sought to reform the Constitutional Court nomination process and Congress' approval or disapproval of his proposal was seen "as a sign of confidence in his administration". The Congress scheduled the election of the new members to the Constitutional Court of Peru for 30 September. On 30 September, the prime minister Salvador del Solar went to the Legislative Palace to request the approval of an amendment to the Organic Law of the Constitutional Court as a matter of confidence. However, the Congress scheduled the minister to the afternoon. While the congress started the debate for the election of the new judges, the prime minister entered the Congress hemicycle room. Del Solar addressed the lawmakers to vote to reform the Constitutional Court nomination process. However, the Congress decided to postpone the vote of the amendment to the afternoon. The Congress named a new member to the Constitutional Court of Peru. Many of the Constitutional Court nominees selected by Congress were alleged to be involved in corruption. Hours later, the Congress approved the confidence motion. Notwithstanding the affirmative vote, Vizcarra stated that the appointment of a new member of the Constitutional Court constituted a de facto vote of no confidence. He said that it was the second act of no-confidence in his government, granting him the authority to dissolve Congress. These actions by Congress, as well as the months of slow progress towards anti-corruption reforms, pushed Vizcarra to dissolve the legislative body on 30 September, with Vizcarra stating "Peruvian people, we have done all we could." Shortly after Vizcarra announced the dissolution of Congress, the legislative body refused to recognize the president's actions, declared Vizcarra as suspended from the presidency, and named Vice President Mercedes Aráoz as the acting president of Peru. Despite this, Peruvian government officials stated that the actions by Congress were void as the body was officially closed at the time of their declarations. By the night of 30 September, Peruvians gathered outside of the Legislative Palace of Peru to protest against Congress and demand the removal of legislators while the heads of the Peruvian Armed Forces met with Vizcarra, announcing that they still recognized him as president of Peru and head of the armed forces. During the evening of 1 October 2019, Mercedes Aráoz, whom Congress had declared acting president, resigned from office. Aráoz resigned, hoping that the move would promote the new general elections proposed by Vizcarra and postponed by Congress. President of Congress Pedro Olaechea was left momentarily speechless when informed of Aráoz's resignation during an interview. At the time, no governmental institution or foreign government recognized Aráoz as president. Vizcarra issued a decree calling for legislative elections on 26 January 2020. The Organization of American States released a statement saying that the Constitutional Court could determine the legality of President Vizcarra's actions and supported his call for legislative elections, saying "It's a constructive step that elections have been called in accordance with constitutional timeframes and that the definitive decision falls to the Peruvian people".

In the legislative elections that followed, Popular Force and their de facto coalition with the Aprista Party fell. APRA lost all of its seats for the first time in 25 years, while Popular Force lost 58 former seats, being left with 15. The successor party to Peruvians for Change, Contigo, also lost all of its seats.

==== First impeachment ====
As Peru's economy declined due to the COVID-19 pandemic in Peru, President Vizcarra faced increased political pressure from the newly inaugurated congress presided by Manuel Merino, with the majority of the legislative body being controlled by those opposing Vizcarra. Finally on 5 July 2020, Vizcarra proposed a referendum to be held during the 2021 Peruvian general election to remove parliamentary immunity, though congress quickly responded by assembling that same night to pass their own immunity bill that contained proposals to remove immunity from the president, constitutional court and the human rights ombudsman while also strengthening some instances of parliamentary immunity.

Since early 2020, investigations began surrounding a contract for a little-known singer by the name of Richard Cisneros to perform speeches for the Ministry of Culture. It was alleged that an inexperienced Cisneros was able to receive payments totaling US$50,000 due to contacts in the Government Palace. Investigators searched offices in the Government Palace on 1 June 2020 regarding the alleged irregularities.

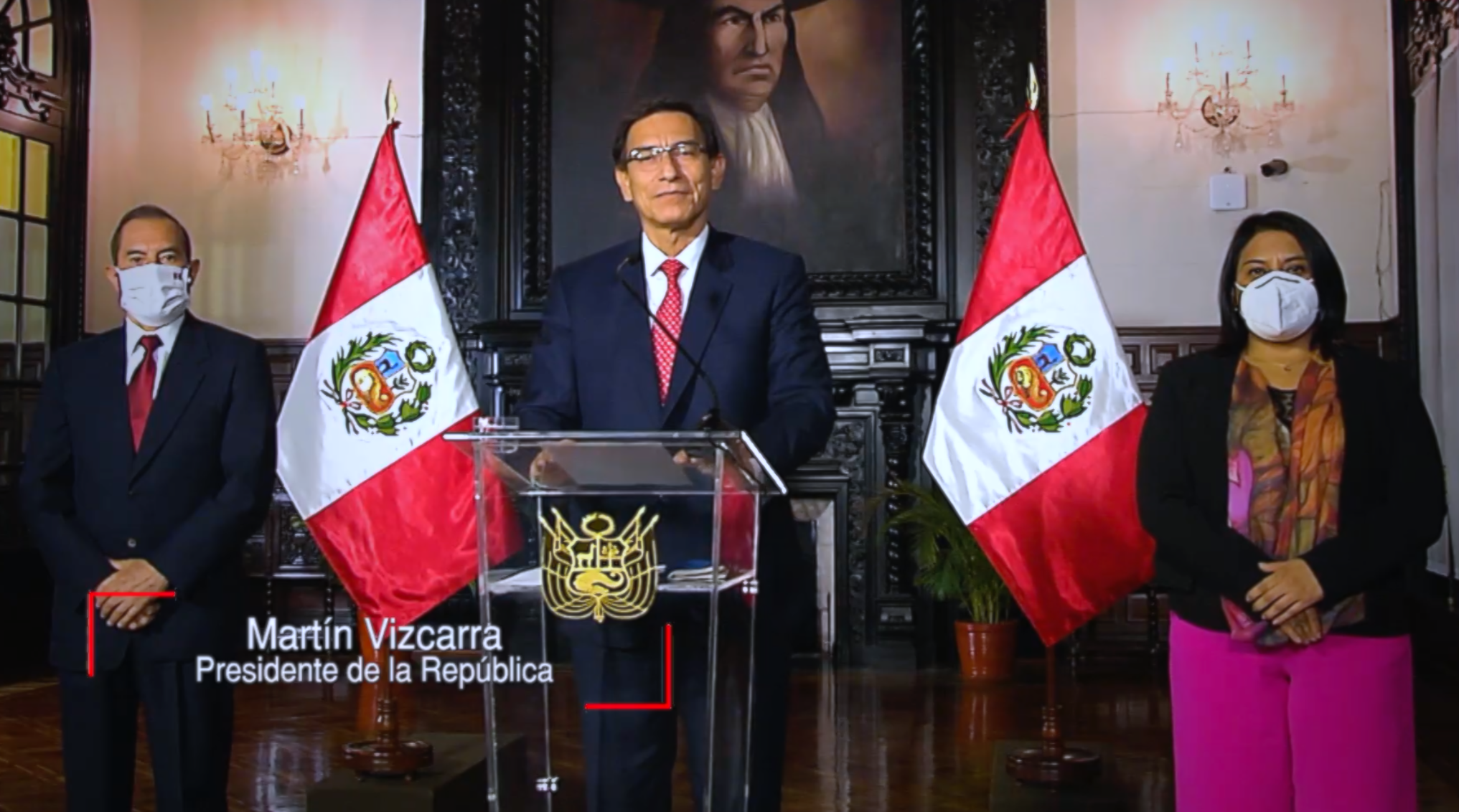
Vizcarra responding to impeachment call in October 2020

According to IDL-Reporteros, lobbyist Karelim López provided opposition lawmaker Edgar Alarcon audio recordings. On 10 September 2020, Alarcon, who faced possible parliamentary immunity revocation related to alleged acts of corruption, released audio recordings purporting that Vizcarra acted with "moral incapacity". The recordings allegedly contain audio of Vizcarra instructing his staff to say that he met with Cisneros only on a limited number of occasions and audio of Cisneros saying that he influenced Vizcarra's rise to office and decision to dissolve congress. Vizcarra responded to the release of the recordings stating "I am not going to resign. I am not running away" and that the "audios have been edited and maliciously manipulated; as you can see, they purposely seek to turn a job-related claim into a criminal or political act, wanting to take words out of context and intend to accuse me of non-existent situations. Nothing is further from reality". In a vote on 11 September, impeachment proceedings against Vizcarra were approved by congress; 65 voted for, 36 voted against and 24 abstained.

On 12 September 2020, renowned reporter Gustavo Gorriti wrote that Merino had contacted the Commanding General of the Peruvian Navy, Fernando Cerdán, notifying him that he was going to attempt to impeach Vizcarra and was hoping to assume the presidency. Minister of Defense Jorge Chávez confirmed that Merino had tried to establish support with the Peruvian military. A second report was later released that Merino had contacted officials throughout Peru's government while preparing to create a transitional cabinet. Following the release of these reports, support for impeaching Vizcarra decreased among members of congress.

On 14 September, President Vizcarra filed a lawsuit in the Constitutional Court of Peru to block the 18 September impeachment vote, stating to during a press conference, "Why has the president of Congress communicated with top military officials, and even planned pseudo-cabinets who would take over? That is conspiracy, gentlemen." Minister of Foreign Affairs Mario Lopez also released a statement that Vizcarra's government had prepared to call upon the Organization of American States' Inter-American Democratic Charter if Vizcarra were to be impeached, with the charter stating "when the government of a member state considers that its democratic political institutional process or its legitimate exercise of power is at risk, it may request assistance from the Secretary General or the Permanent Council for the strengthening and preservation of its democratic system". On 18 September, Vizcarra gave a speech for twenty minutes after appearing before congress. Following ten hours of deliberation, 32 members of congress supported the motion to remove Vizcarra from the office of the presidency, 78 voted against his removal and 15 abstained from voting, with 87 votes of 130 being required for his removal. If Vizcarra were to be removed from office, Manuel Merino would assume the presidential office given his position as president of congress and due to the absence of vice presidents for Vizcarra. (Note: Peru has two Vice Presidents, a First and Second Vice President. The most recent holders of the office of First and Second Vice President were Vizcarra and Mercedes Aráoz, respectively, who were elected in the 2016 election. Vizcarra left the office of First Vice President vacant after he succeeded Kuzcynski as President, leaving Aráoz as the sole Vice President, while Aráoz resigned as Second Vice President on 1 October 2019 after the Congress of Peru named Aráoz acting President the day before after having declared Vizacarra temporarily unfit for office, despite Congress having itself been dissolved earlier that day by President Vizcarra, resulting in a constitutional crisis. However, her resignation was not official until it was accepted on 7 May 2020 by the new Congress of Peru sworn on 16 March 2020, since in Peru the resignation of the vice president has to be accepted by Congress and that institution was not celebrating meetings given its dissolution.)

Further revelations showed that ethnocacerist leader Antauro Humala, brother of former president Ollanta Humala, had used his Union for Peru party and its lawmakers as proxies in order to overthrow Vizcarra from power, raising concerns for possible anti-democratic activities and other intent.

==== Removal ====
After the first attempt failed, Edgar Alarcón of Union for Peru raised a new vacancy request in October 2020, based on the alleged acts of corruption by Vizcarra when he was regional Governor of Moquegua, which includes the testimony of an applicant to an effective collaborator in the "Construction Club Case" who stated that Obrainsa company paid him 1 million soles and three other aspiring effective collaborators also point out that he received 1.3 million soles from the Ingenieros Civiles y Contractors Generales SA consortium (ICCGSA), and Incot for the tender of the project for the construction of the Regional Hospital of Moquegua in 2013. The new impulse to the vacancy motion came, then, at the initiative of the left party Union for Peru, Broad Front, Podemos Perú, Popular Action and a number of independents. The motion received 27 signatures, surpassing the minimum threshold required to pose an impeachment inquiry (26 congressmen). The motion was presented to Congress on 20 October 2020. A minimum of 52 votes from Congress is required to initiate impeachment proceedings.

On 25 October, Walter Martos announced that the Armed Forces “[will not] allow the rule of law to be broken with such need of the people. At this moment, five months before the elections,” which was highly controversial because Article 169 of the Political Constitution of Peru states that the Armed Forces and National Police are not deliberative and are subordinate to the constitutional process. On October 27, Martos said that his statements were misinterpreted and stated that "We will never use [in reference to the government] the Armed Forces in political acts beyond their function."

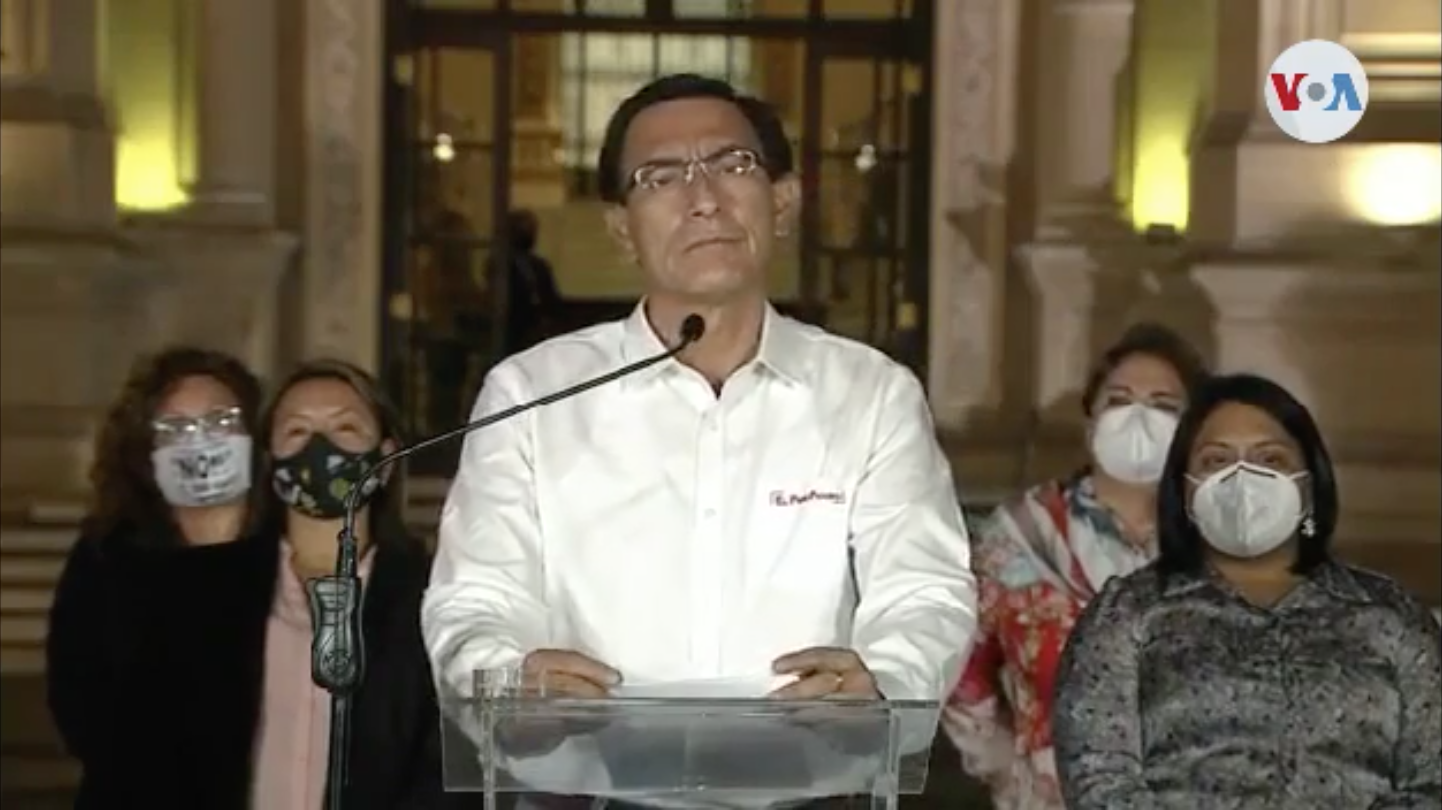
Martín Vizcarra after being vacated from office, 9 November

On 2 November, the admission of the vacancy motion was debated in the plenary session of Congress, at the end of which the plenary session of Congress proceeded to vote on the motion, obtaining 60 votes in favor of starting the vacancy process, 40 votes in against and 18 abstentions. The motion received the unanimous support of the Union for Peru, other parliamentary groups decided to vote freely without a collegiate consensus, the parliamentarians of Alliance for Progress and the Purple Party were against, the parliamentarians of FREPAP and 3 legislators from other benches abstained.

Vizcarra minimized the vacancy motion, saying he trusted that in Parliament "sanity will prevail" and pointed out that "The only thing that we do not accept is that among the arguments they put in the vacancy motion, is that they use that transparent elections are not guaranteed. Please. That we do not accept. What we are doing here is guaranteeing totally transparent elections, because we do not participate in the elections. What greater transparency of this? ". He also accused some political parties of wanting to affect the general elections of 2021 since" they have no chance in the elections." Nevertheless, Merino ratified defense of the planned elections day. Likewise, the president of the Council of Ministers Walter Martos pointed out that "a group of congressmen is breaking the Constitution" and considered that it is "tremendously irresponsible" that a second vacancy motion is raised.

On the other hand, part of the congressmen of the Broad Front, specifically the congressmen Mirtha Vásquez and Rocío Silva Santisteban, expressed that they would not support the vacancy motion and issued a statement in which they said that "We cannot and do not want to stop putting life first, and especially life, at the risk of a fresh start to change health strategies that could lead to more and more deaths.

Reports emerged following the vote from IDL-Reporteros that multiple congressmen pledged support to Vizcarra and later voted for his removal on 9 November. While visiting Cajamarca on 6 November, Vizcarra did not appear worried about the vacancy vote according to one source, though some on the trip with Vizcarra appeared distant and refused to be in photographs with the president. Somos Peru congress woman Felícita Tocto told Vizcarra that she would vote against the vacancy and encourage colleagues to do the same, though she would later vote in favor of his removal.

On 9 November, initial discussions between Vizcarra and congressmen left him feeling positive as he appeared in Congress. While at the legislative palace, Vizcarra criticized legislators who sought to vacate him from office, saying that sixty-eight congressmen were being investigated for alleged crimes themselves. Vizcarra also said that the contracts in question were administered by an agency assigned by the United Nations, not his own office. Ministerial staff stated that following Vizcarra's comments, the dozens of legislators that Vizcarra mentioned became determined to convince other members of congress to support votes for his removal, making strong arguments against Vizcarra.

Hans Troyes of Popular Action reported that in the intermission room of the legislative palace, those in support of Vizcarra's removal told legislators that said they wanted to abstain or vote against the president's removal that they would refuse to sign their bills proposed in congress. After returning from a trip to Junín after his speech in congress, Vizcarra received a call from César Acuña–who had told Vizcarra his Alliance for Progress party would not support his removal–with Acuña warning Vizcarra that his party would vote in support of his removal. Vizcarra did not propose any defense to Acuña and ended the call shortly after learning this information.

Shortly before the vacancy vote, Vizcarra and his ministerial staff learned that many congressmen had turned away from supporting him and calls to legislators were not being answered. After learning what the outcome of the vote would be, Vizcarra gathered his ministers at the Government Palace at 7:30pm PET, telling those close to him "Up to here and no more ... I'm tired", telling ministers "I don't want to give the impression that I want to cling to power". He then spoke to the public and departed from the Government Palace on the same night.

The controversial removal of Vizcarra was defined as a coup by many Peruvians, political analysts and media outlets in the country. Revelations were later made again of Antauro Humala's involvement, which raised even more concerns about possible systemic corruption.

=== Merino and Sagasti presidencies ===
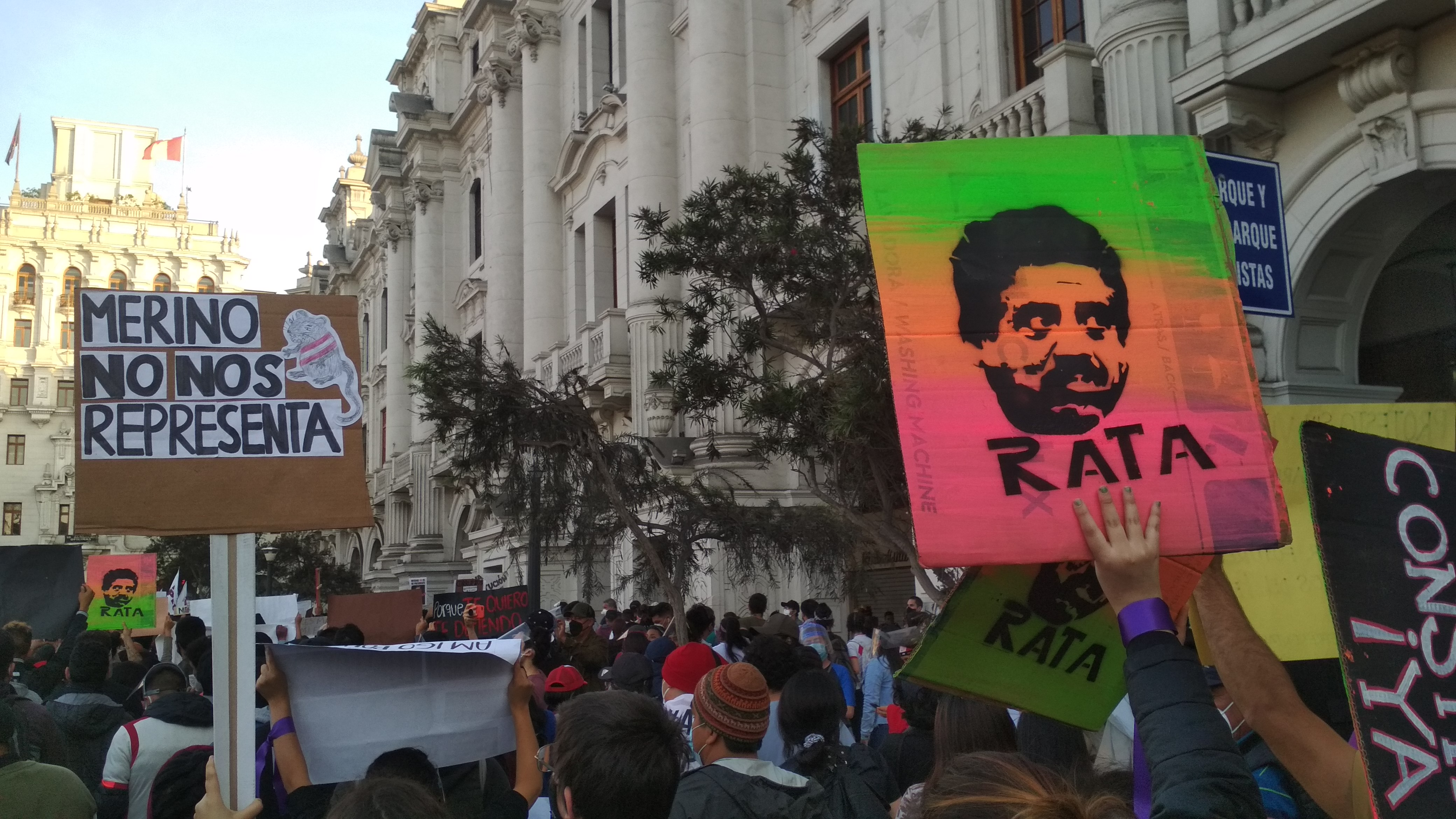
A protest against Merino in Lima on 12 November 2020

Following Vizcarra's controversial removal from office, it was announced that Manuel Merino would assume the presidency, flaring up unrest. Merino was inaugurated at 10:42 a.m. (Peru Time) on 10 November 2020, in the midst of protests across the country against his ascension to the presidency. The following day, under the pressure of forming a new government, he named Ántero Flores Aráoz, a conservative politician and former Minister of Defense under former President Alan García, as Prime Minister. The Secretary General of the Organization of American States, Luis Almagro, expressed his concern about the issue and "reiterates that it is the responsibility of the Constitutional Court of Peru to rule on the legality and legitimacy of the institutional decisions adopted."

A march, beginning at 5 PM PET on 12 November, occurred throughout Peru to demand the resignation of President Manuel Merino, with a primary location being at Plaza San Martín. Richard Cisneros, who was the singer involved in Vizcarra's first impeachment scandal, arrived at the plaza minutes before the march began, angering protesters who threw objects at him until he took refuge inside a nearby fast food store. The newly named Minister of Justice, Delia Muñoz, described calls for protests as "propaganda" while new Minister of Labor Juan Sheput falsely said "the protests are waning" and told the public that businesses would be hurt by the protests.

Following the death of two protesters during clashes on 14 November, Merino stepped down as president, citing that he acted within the law when he was sworn into office the previous Tuesday and that he would "do everything in my power to guarantee a constitutional succession."

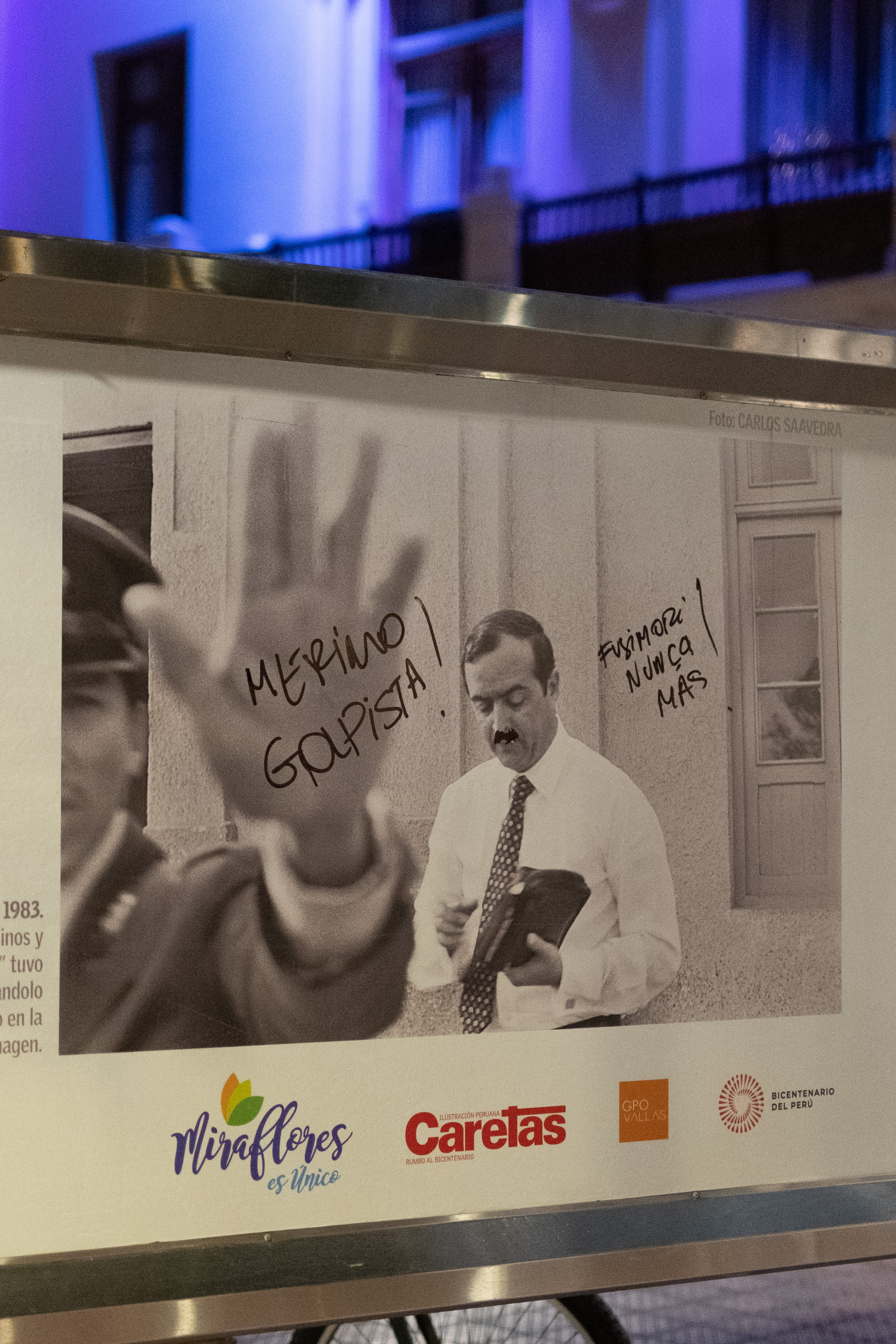
Antifujimorist and anti-Merino message scribbled onto a public poster of Vladimiro Montesinos amidst protests, 11 November 2020

On 16 November 2020, Francisco Sagasti was elected by the legislature to be the new President of Congress. Due to vacancies in the position of President and Vice President, he became President of Peru by the line of succession. Upon taking office, he established his four main priorities for his temporary tenure; the management of the COVID-19 pandemic in Peru, combatting corruption within the country, creating a stable economy and the promotion of education to rural areas. Support for Sagasti's presidency was expressed by Chile, the European Union, United Kingdom and the United States. Sagasti, as well as the attorney general, launched a probe against Manuel Merino for possible human rights violations.

Like preceding presidents, Americas Quarterly wrote that Sagasti faced difficult relations with congress and that he will need to manage the effects of the two governments before him, including holding those responsible for violently responding to protests accountable for their actions. Sagasti attempted to reform the leadership of the National Police due to their use of violence during protests, removing Commander General Orlando Velasco from leading the National Police. Eighteen additional generals of the National Police resigned or were dismissed, with Interior Minister Rubén Vargas resigning following the change to leadership. Five days later Vargas' successor Cluber Aliaga would also resign in disagreement with Sagasti, defending the use of force by police saying that protesters initiated violence. Sagasti was eligible to seek election for a full term, however the Purple Party nominated Julio Guzmán as their candidate for the 2021 Peruvian general election, with Sagasti on the ticket as Second Vice President.

On November 27, former president Martín Vizcarra considered that Sagasti's replacement in the senior ranks "is not legal" and that the Sagasti government must "respect the institutional framework." On December 1, the former president Francisco Morales Bermúdez with former Defense Ministers Julio Velásquez Giacarini, Roberto Chiabra, Jorge Kisic Wagner, Jorge Moscoso, Walter Martos and Jorge Chávez Cresta, 12 former heads of the Joint Command of the Armed Forces and former general commanders of the Army, Navy and of the Air Force described that the change in the Police was "illegal" and maintained that the decision "is contrary to the legal system, affects the morale of the National Police of Peru and undermines the work that this institution carries out.

On December 2, journalist Nicolás Lúcar released the testimony of a former member of the deactivated Special Intelligence Group (GEIN) who revealed that an alleged half-brother of the Minister of the Interior was a leader of the Shining Path terrorist group; information denied by Minister Vargas. A few hours later, Rubén Vargas Céspedes resigned from the Ministry of the Interior. He was replaced by Cluber Aliaga Lodtmann.

On 12 March 2021, the prosecutor Germán Juárez Atoche requested preventive detention for 18 months for former president Martín Vizcarra. This, within the framework of the investigation for the alleged crimes of aggravated collusion, improper passive bribery and illicit association to commit a crime. The hearing was scheduled for 17 March, where Judge María de los Ángeles Álvarez Camacho, after hearing both reasons from the prosecution and the defense of Vizcarra, was rejected the request for preventive detention and appearance with restrictions was imposed.

==== 2021 elections and controversy ====
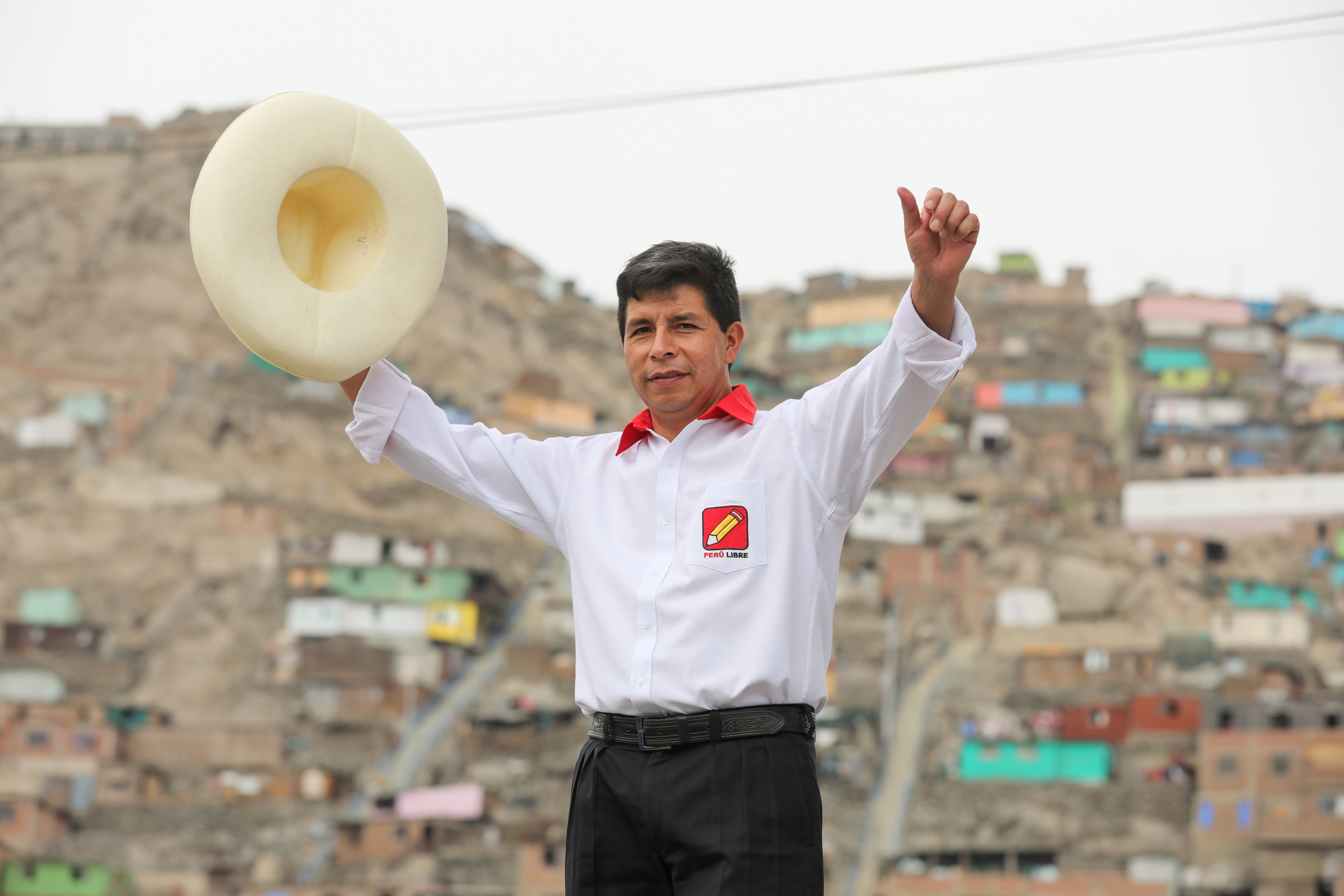
Pedro Castillo, the unexpected winner of the 2021 elections. It wasn't until the very end that he appeared in the polls.

The 2021 elections contained the most candidates at that time, containing almost 18 candidates. Among them were Pedro Castillo, who had led the 2017 Teacher's strike; Keiko Fujimori; and businessman Rafael López Aliaga. Castillo's campaign with the Communist Free Peru Party, which often promoted the views of Fidel Castro and Hugo Chávez, brought controversy due to their views regarding Venezuelans in the country, as well as campaigning for the expulsion of DEA agents and the pardon of rebel leader Antauro Humala.

On 23 May, a mass killing of eighteen people occurred in San Miguel del Ene, a rural area in the Vizcatán del Ene District of Satipo Province. Along with the corpses, some of which were burned, leaflets signed by the MPCP were found, featuring the hammer and sickle and defining the attack as a social cleansing operation. The leaflets also called for a boycott of the 6 June elections and accused those who voted for Keiko Fujimori and her Popular Force party of treason. The military quickly accused Shining Path of the attack, although they were allegedly referring to the MCPC. However, no formal investigation had been performed before the links to Shining Path were claimed. OjoPúblico described the media release by the military as "an inaccurate reference to the Shining Path."

The attack and subsequent media coverage would provide increased support for Fujimori, whose rhetoric aligned Castillo with armed communists. The Fujimori campaign used the attack as a springboard for support, pointing to alleged ties between MOVADEF, a Shining Path political group, and Castillo, attempting to align him to the attack. Fujimori expressed condemnation against the attack during a press conference in Tarapoto as well as regret that "bloody acts" still happened in the country and her condolences to the relatives of the victims. Pedro Castillo also condemned the killings during a rally in Huánuco, expressing solidarity towards the relatives of the victims and also urging the National Police to investigate the attack to clarify the events. Vladimir Cerrón, Secretary General of Free Peru, stated that "the right-wing needed [Shining] Path to win"; Cerrón deleted the tweet moments later while condemning any act of terrorism. Prime Minister Nuria Esparch, who held the position of the Ministry of Defense, condemned the attack and guaranteed that the electoral process would take place normally.

The election also saw the emergence of many far-right candidates. Regarding the first round of presidential elections, Javier Puente, assistant professor of Latin American Studies at Smith College in the North American Congress on Latin America wrote: "With a baffling number of candidates – 18 in total – the 2021 presidential ballot included convicted felons, presumed money launderers, xenophobes, a fascist billionaire, an overrated and outdated economist, a retired mediocre footballer, a person accused of murdering a journalist, and other colorful figures. The vast majority of candidates represented the continuation of the neoliberal economic model that has been responsible for decades of meager financial performance and unequal growth." Puente stated that only three leftist candidates proposed alternatives to the neoliberal politicians (Veronika Mendoza, Marco Arana, and Pedro Castillo), describing Castillo as "far from being a 'comrade' who will champion leftist demands, Castillo is the new face of an anti-system impulse. ... Only in a neoliberal system that outcasts any form of market dissent as radical would a figure like Castillo acquire a role as a leftist."

The Americas Quarterly argues that such behavior resulted with less support for the leftist candidate Verónika Mendoza and promoted political polarization within Peru. With the ongoing political crisis that saw in the span of two years the dissolution of the Congress of Peru and the removal of three presidents (Pedro Pablo Kuczynski, Martín Vizcarra, and Manuel Merino), concerns were raised among analysts about the increased political polarization's relationship with Peru's democratic stability. Lead researcher of pollster Institute of Peruvian Studies, Patricia Zárate, stated: "I think the scenario that's coming is really frightening."

As the second round of elections approached, Fujimori's campaign used fearmongering tactics to gain support of the middle and upper classes in Lima, accusing Castillo of attempting to institute communism in Peru and to follow the path of Hugo Chávez and Nicolas Maduro in Venezuela. Some scholars have recognized the similarities of Fujimori and Castillo; both are cultural conservatives opposing same-sex marriage and abortion, as campaigning for the second round of elections began. Olga González, associate dean of the Kofi Annan Institute for Global Citizenship at Macalester College, stated that the situation is more complex than "binaries" between social classes, although she acknowledged that such dichotomies "speak to how polarized the country is."

In the second round of elections, Peru's major media networks were accused of aligning with Fujimori to discredit Castillo. Some news media allegedly disseminated fake news against Castillo. Le Monde diplomatique wrote, "The privately owned media torpedoed Castillo incessantly with fake news, and not without rattling the Shining Path scarecrow". International media also stated that Peruvian news organizations polished Fujimori's image and praised her, as well as assisting her media campaign tactic which included attacks accusing Castillo of being linked to armed communist groups. The Guardian described accusations linking Castillo to Shining Path as "incorrect", while the Associated Press said that allegations by Peruvian media of links to Shining Path were "unsupported."

With the support of Mario Vargas Llosa and his son Álvaro Vargas Llosa's neoliberal Fundación International para la Libertad (FIL), Fujimori attempted to reshape her image as being more democratic. Vargas Llosa ran and lost against Alberto Fujimori in Peru's 1990 elections, and had previously criticized Fujimori, making statements such as "the worst option is that of Keiko Fujimori because it means the legitimation of one of the worst dictatorships that Peru has had in its history" and that "Keiko is the daughter of a murderer and a thief who is imprisoned, tried by civil courts with international observers, sentenced to 25 years in prison for murder and theft. I do not want her to win the elections."

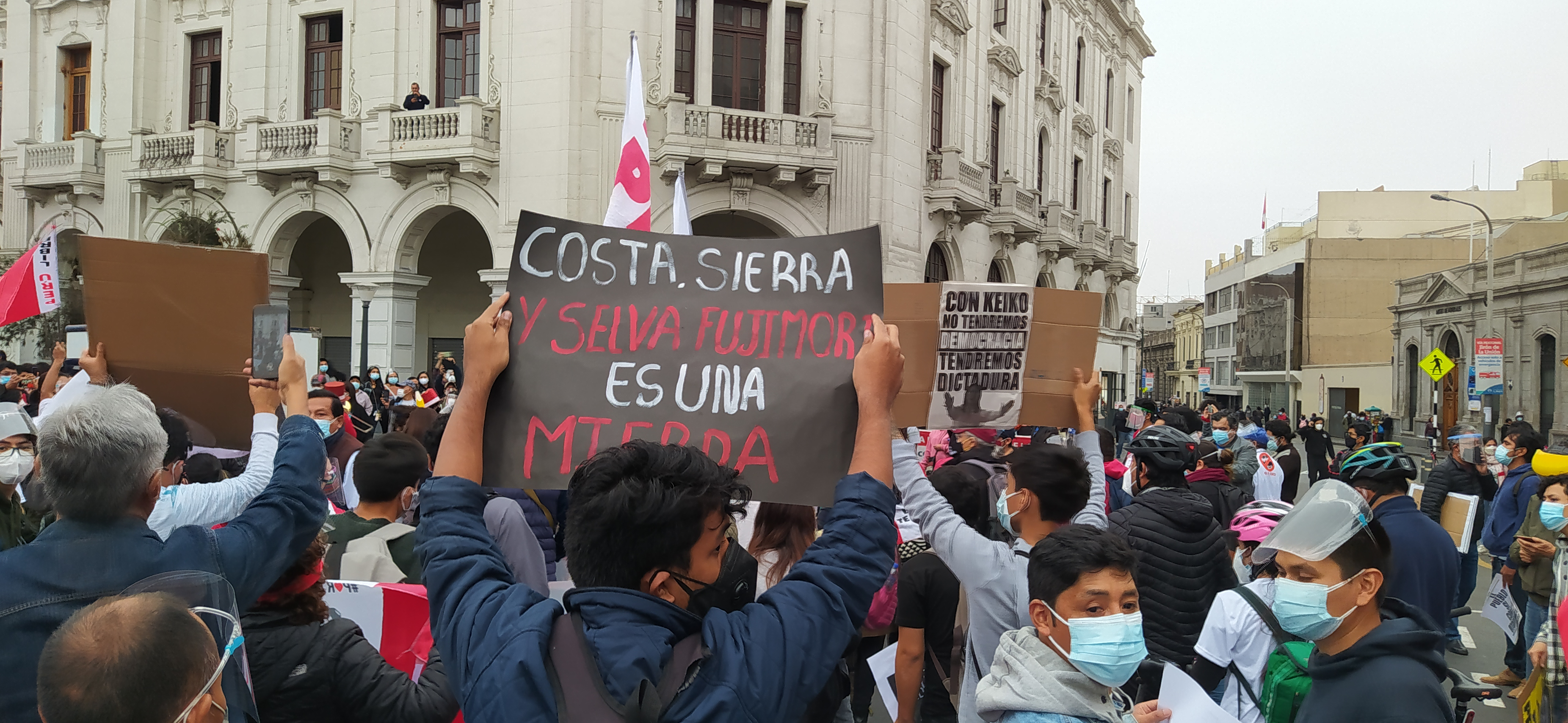
An anti-fujimorist manifestation in Lima on 22 May following Keiko Fujimori's attempt to obstruct the election

After Castillo took the lead during the ballot-counting process, Fujimori promoted unproven claims of electoral fraud. In a media event following election day, Fujimori alleged that a "series of irregularities" had occurred, presenting photographs and videos in an attempt to support her allegations, while also accusing Free Peru of attempting to "distort and delay" the election process. Fujimori argued that it consisted in the challenge of polling stations where Fujimori would register a greater number of votes than his opponent, previous training talks by Free Peru in which they ask their representatives to arrive early at the polling stations to ensure control of the polling stations where titular members did not attend and irregularities in the vote count. To support the complaints, Keiko's running mate, Luis Galarreta, assured that Free Peru did a "high number of challenges" to electoral acts in which Keiko was favoured so they could not be counted to the final estimate until they were evaluated first by the National Jury of Elections. According to the complaint, over 1 300 voting acts were challenged by Free Peru; however, the first claims were rebutted by national electoral entities. After the resolution of the challenged votes and the acts observed by the Special Electoral Juries, the National Office of Electoral Processes published the total results on 15 June, in which Pedro Castillo surpassed Keiko Fujimori in number of votes.

According to The Guardian, various international observers countered Fujimori's claims, stating that the election process was conducted in accordance with international standards. Observers from the Inter-American Union of Electoral Organizations, the Organization of American States, and the Progressive International denied any instances of widespread fraud and praised the accuracy of the elections. The Guardian also reported that analysts and political observers criticized Fujimori's remarks, noting that it made her appear desperate after losing her third presidential run in a ten-year period. Fernando Tuesta, political scientist from the Pontifical Catholic University of Peru, stated: "It's extremely regrettable that when the result is not favourable, that the candidate talks about fraud. It's terrible, ... They have been talking about fraud because they don't want to respect the result." On 9 June, Fujimori sought to have around 200,000 votes annulled and for 300,000 votes to be reviewed.

Following reports of Castillo's apparent victory, Fujimori and her supporters made unsubstantiated claims of electoral fraud, leading obstructionist efforts to overturn the election with support of wealthy citizens of Lima. The economic and political elites refused to recognize Castillo's ascent to the presidency, with those among the more affluent, including former military officers and wealthy families, demanded new elections, promoted calls for a military coup, and utilized classist or racist rhetoric to support their allegations of fraud. According to analysts, Peru was more susceptible to unrest as a result of Fujimori's narrative since democratic institutions are weaker in the nation. Minor clashes occurred in Lima between Fujimori supporters from the capital city and Castillo supporters from other regions, with rondas campesinas equipped with sticks and machetes arriving in the Historic Centre of Lima to defend Castillo's election and dissuade Fujimori protesters. Fujimori's response to Castillo's victory was also to portray her movement as defending democracy and assumed a nationalist image, adopting the Peru national football team uniform and colors during rallies. This intensified political polarization between urban and rural Peruvians, portraying rich, white individuals as democratic while identifying indigenous poor individuals as communists.

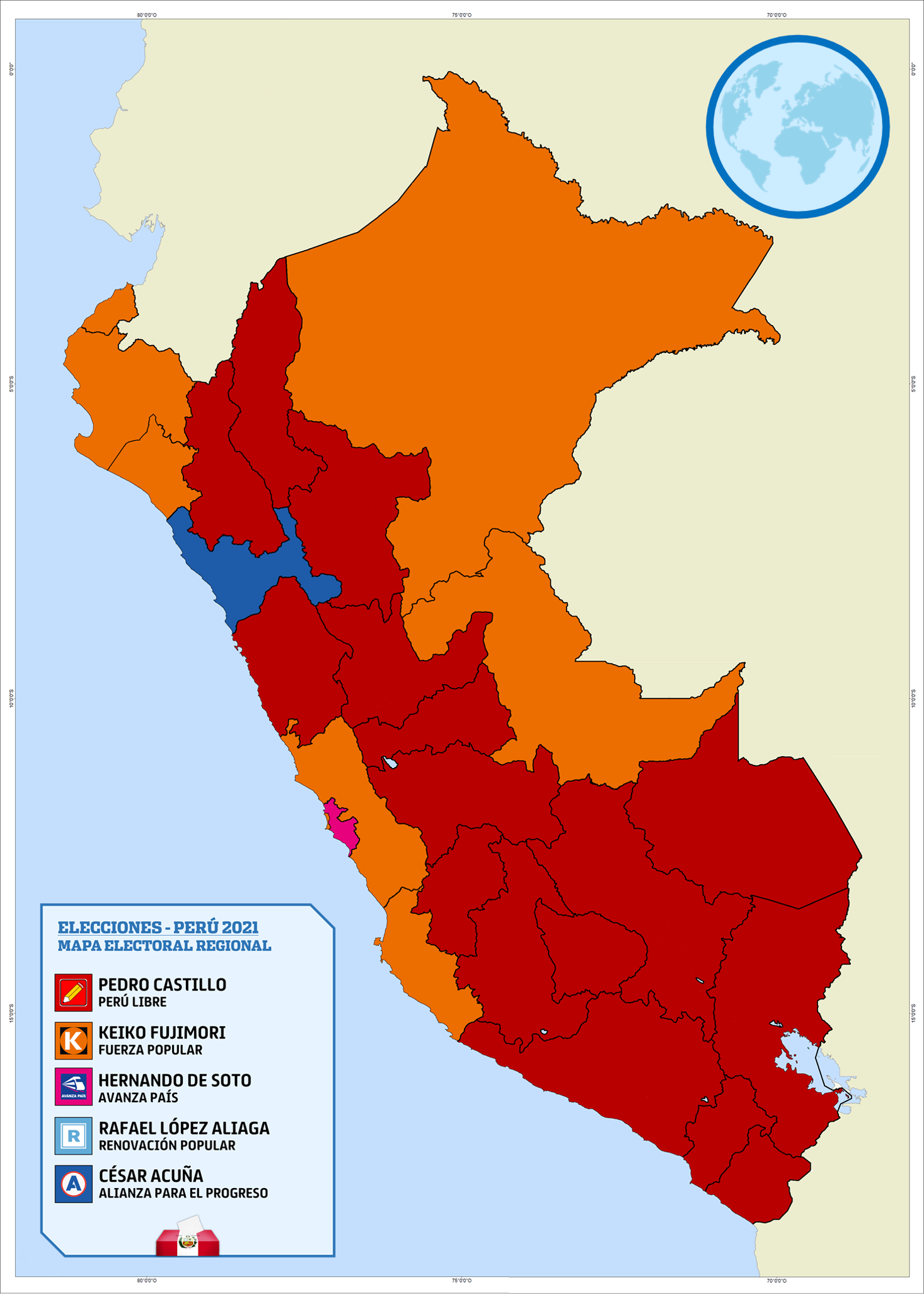
Results of the first round of the election

After exit polls gave the victory to Keiko Fujimori over Pedro Castillo, supporters of Free Peru mobilized to the offices of the ONPE to protest against a possible fraud against their candidate, bringing banners saying "no to the fraud." From Tacabamba, Cajamarca, Castillo called upon his followers and supporters on Twitter to "defend the votes" and go to the streets to "defend democracy." Protests against Fujimori and an alleged fraud took place in cities such as Juliaca, Puno, and Ilave.

After the publication of the quick count and the first official results, protests by supporters of both Free Peru and Popular Force took place. Amid the fraud accusations and the final vote count, there were nearly daily protests and marches, mostly in the capital Lima. Besides Fujimori supporters, groups opposed to Castillo, mobilized by the fear of communism or aversion to the left wing, mobilized asking for the annulment of the elections. Among the opposition groups there were anti-communists, far-right followers, and fascist groups, including members of Legionary Action ('Acción Legionaria'). During a mobilization in the San Martín Square in Lima, rondas campesinas supportive of Castillo carried machetes with them. On 14 July, several pro-Fujimori protesters gathered at the Government Palace demanding an audit of the election. Protesters clashed with the National Police of Peru, and Health Minister Óscar Ugarte and Housing Minister Solangel Fernández were attacked during the protests. On 15 July, Sagasti reaffirmed that there was no evidence of voter fraud.

Senior fellow of the Washington Office on Latin America Jo Marie Burt described the overturn attempts as "a slow-motion conspiracy to prevent Castillo from becoming president", with The Guardian reporting that if Castillo was prevented from becoming president by 28 July 2021, a new election would be initiated. Fujimori's statements about possibly overturning the election, along with her use of fake news and legal challenges, were also described as being inspired by the attempts to overturn the 2020 U.S. presidential election by former U.S. president Donald Trump. According to Cornell University professor of Latin American politics Kenneth Roberts, "[w]hen the credibility is called into question the way it has been by Trump and the Republicans in the U.S., it creates a bad example that other leaders and countries can follow, providing a template to change results they don't like."

To avoid the questions of election legitimacy, election authorities in Peru approved the use of election monitoring. In total, one hundred and fifty observers (ninety-nine in Peru and fifty-one abroad) were approved to observe elections throughout Peru. The origin of the observers were from twenty-two different countries, with thirty-five observers from the Organization of American States, while others were from Argentina, Colombia, Costa Rica, Ecuador, El Salvador, Guatemala, Mexico, Panama, Paraguay, Spain, Switzerland, the United States, and Uruguay. Observer approval required providing election authorities observation plans; these plans included protocols to inform authorities of crimes, violations of electoral law or any complaints they collected. Observers were then responsible with providing an official, final report to authorities. According to OjoPúblico, "the observers carry out the review of the activities of election day, ranging from the installation of the voting tables, the conditioning of the secret chambers, the conformity of the ballots, the minutes, the amphorae and any other electoral material, to the counting, the counting of the vote and the transfer of the electoral records at the end of the day."

On 10 June, the Peruvian Prosecution asked for the detention of Keiko on charges of violating the conditional liberty that she was granted during the open criminal process against her. On 17 June, Fujimori repeated claims of voter fraud. On 28 June, Fujimori traveled to the Government Palace and personally delivered demands to President Francisco Sagasti to initiate an audit of the results by international entities. On 30 June, several members of the Popular Force party traveled to the OAS Building in Washington, D.C., to publicize the voter fraud claims, with sociologist Francesca Emanuele condemning them as "coup plotters" during a press conference. On 2 July, Sagasti rejected a request to audit the second round of the election, and Fujimori accused Sagasti of abdicating his "great responsibility to ensure fair elections." On 19 July, Fujimori admitted her defeat but reaffirmed that "votes were stolen" from her. On 18 June, former Supreme Court President Javier Villa Stein filed a complaint for protection by describing the ballot vote as "questioned", arguing an alleged "electoral process flawed by various acts that undermine the popular will" and asking the judiciary branch to "declare the election void." Lawyer Renán Galindo Peralta requested that it be rejected outright considering it inadmissible because it did not fall under the Organic Law of Elections and because the judicial branch lacked the powers to annul elections.

On 23 June, Luis Arce, a judge on the National Jury of Elections (JNE), resigned and alleged bias on the jury which had rejected ten Fujimori requests to annul Castillo votes. On its Twitter account, JNE rejected Arce's allegation of bias as "offensive", and said its judges were not allowed to resign in the middle of reviews of cases, so he would be suspended instead, and a provisional replacement found "to avoid delaying our work." Castillo's Free Peru party said the resignation was aimed at "preventing the proclamation of Pedro Castillo, thereby ignoring the popular vote, breaking democracy and installing a coup d'état with silk gloves." In the wake of Arce's resignation, a lawyer representing Fujimori said that the government should consider asking the Organization of American States (OAS) to audit the electoral process, as was done during the 2019 Bolivian political crisis. The OAS stated that its mission to the country had not found any issues in the conduct of the election. Former candidate George Forsyth attributed it as part of the preparation of a "coup d'etat" and that Arce himself was "attacking democracy."

On 25 June, former 2001 and 2016 presidential candidate Fernando Olivera revealed audio tapes, alleging that Vladimiro Montesinos, who was the right-hand man to former President Alberto Fujimori currently serving a prison sentence for crimes committed during the Fujimori period, was behind the attempts for Keiko Fujimori to be declared as the winner of the second round against Castillo, including through the payment of bribes to electoral officials and influencing the National Jury of Elections. The National Penitentiary Institute and Peruvian Navy announced an investigation, confirming that Montesinos made two phone calls from Callao Naval Base where he is jailed, on 10 and 23 June to unauthorised persons coordinating the effort to overturn the election.

Further reports showed that Montesinos allegedly was able to make seventeen phone calls from a landline phone to retired military officer Pedro Rejas, reportedly suggesting to Rejas that bribes needed to be paid and that Fujimori's husband, an American, go to the United States embassy in Lima to present "documentation of the fraud" to the Office of Regional Affairs and Central Intelligence Agency. According to IDL-Reporteros, Montesinos suggests that the documentation would reach President Joe Biden and that his administration would condemn the election as interference from Cuba, Nicaragua, and Venezuela, subsequently giving Fujimori's claims of fraud more weight. Rumors also spread of a possible coup d'état against Castillo, if he were declared the official winner of the presidential election. A letter signed by almost one-hundred retired officers, including Francisco Morales Bermúdez, of the Peruvian armed forces was written calling on current military leaders in Peru to refuse recognizing the election of Castillo into the presidency. President Sagasti condemned the letter, stating: "They want to incite top commanders of the Army, Navy, and Air force to break the rule of law."

On 14 July, several pro-Fujimori protesters gathered at the Government Palace demanding an audit of the election. Protesters, many of which were members of the neofascist La Resistencia Dios, Patria y Familia, clashed with the National Police of Peru, and Health Minister Óscar Ugarte and Housing Minister Solangel Fernández were attacked during the protests. On 15 July, Sagasti reaffirmed that there was no evidence of voter fraud.

On 19 July, Fujimori admitted her defeat but reaffirmed that "votes were stolen" from her.

=== Castillo presidency ===
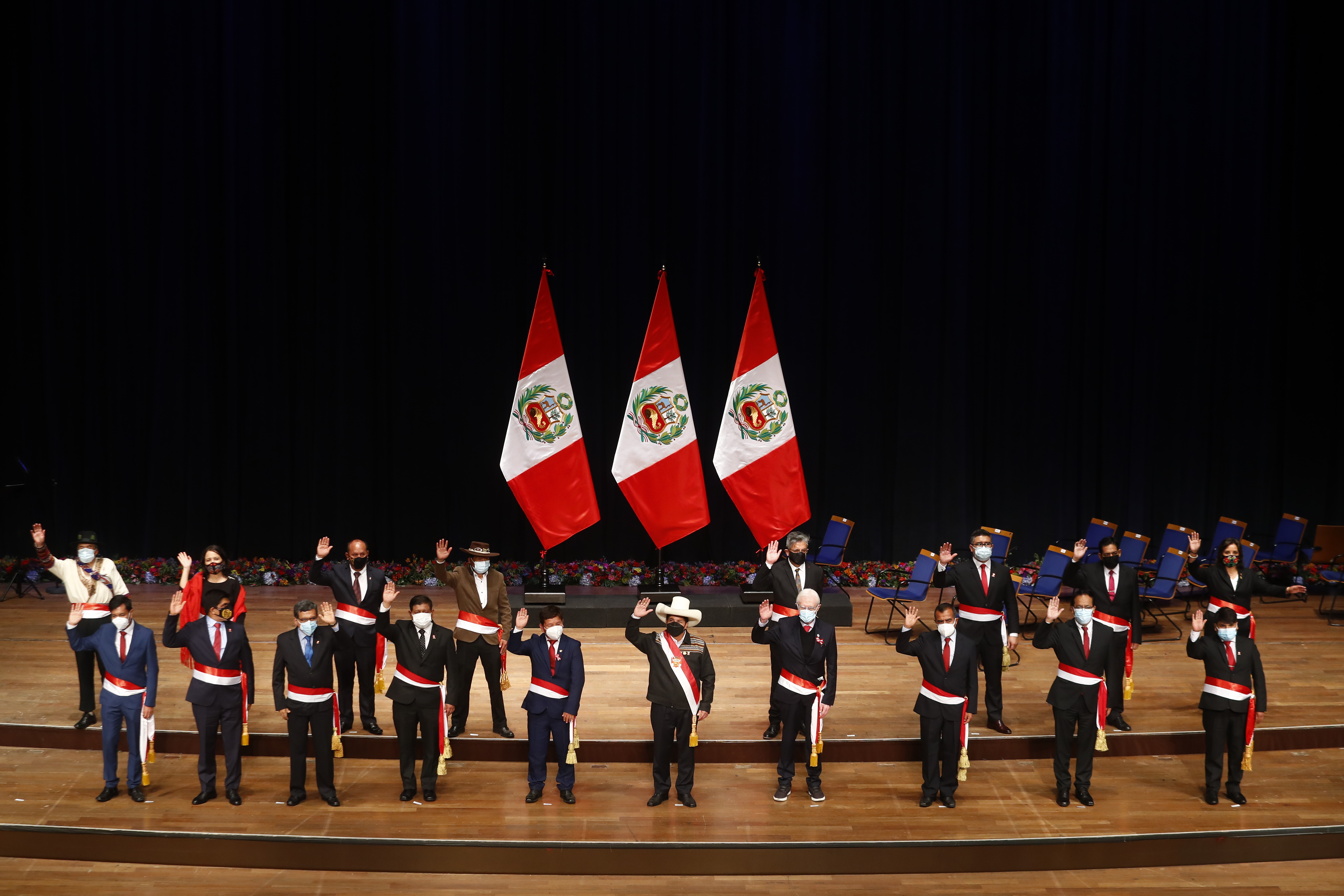
Castillo and his first cabinet, led by Guido Bellido.

On 20 August 2021, Congress voted against a proposal to declare the former Bolivian president Evo Morales a persona non grata. However, on 22 November 2021, the Foreign Relations Commission of Congress, led by Popular Force, agreed to declare Evo Morales a persona non grata for "his negative political activism" and "political interference" in Peruvian territory, referring to repeated trips Morales undertook to rally support for Castillo's agenda. The Foreign Relations Commission (FRC) also questioned Morales' protection by state security and use of official vehicles. The FRC's resolution urged authorities to take "necessary actions" to prohibit Morales from entering Peru.

Almost immediately after his appointment as Foreign Minister, the media began reporting on Héctor Béjar's past. Béjar had been part of the National Liberation Army during the 1960s and had met Che Guevara according to his book "Peru 1965: Notes on a Guerrilla Experience." In a video published in November 2020, Béjar had said that 'terrorism began in the Navy' and that 'the Shining Path was trained by the CIA', leading to significant public backlash. Later, the Peruvian Navy put out a statement about wanting Béjar to retract, and claimed that Béjar's statement were an affront against those who fought against terrorism. Following that, Congress started an interpellation process against Béjar, which was seen by manyas a show trial that would be almost certainly followed by impeachment. However, Béjar resigned before the interpellations began. According to Béjar, Prime Minister Guido Bellido asked him to resign to prevent him from speaking before Congress, which he said was a way of censoring him. Béjar held the position of Foreign Minister for just 19 days. His replacement was the career diplomat Óscar Maúrtua.

After his resignation, Béjar posted "I am free again!!!" on Facebook. Later, he would claim that this was the beginning of a soft coup against the Castillo's government. Béjar also claimed that there is a group in the Navy and the extreme right that does not want an independent foreign policy. He also claimed that his phrases were distorted and taken out of context. Béjar stated that his expressions on the Navy were about a bomb plot against the Minister of War in 1975, and an attack against two Cuban fishing boats off the coast of Peru in 1977. Declassified documents show that the US Embassy suspected that these attacks were carried out by right-wing sectors of the Navy, which were unhappy with the military junta's close ties to Cuba at the time.

To resolve the renewed waves of protests, a delegation led by then Prime Minister Guido Bellido arrived to Tambobamba on 17 September. The Prime Minister pledged to negotiate a solution between the mining communities and MMG Limited within two months. However, two weeks later the miners grew upset over a perceived lack of progress, and thus resumed their strike.

The Free Peru parliamentarian Margot Palacios spoke out against the FRC's resolution, saying that "Only a colonial mentality, narrow, premodern, medieval and discriminatory, can deny entry to Peru to a brother who has done much for the Andean culture, of which Peruvians and Bolivians are part of. For several centuries, we were one state: the Tahuantinsuyo."

On 3 October, the 53rd anniversary of Juan Velasco's rise to power via a military coup d'état, Castillo announced the start of the Second Agrarian Reform with the aim of helping small farmers and ending abuse and inequality. This was a tacit acknowledgement of the original Agrarian Reform carried out by Velasco. Castillo stated that the Second Agrarian Reform will respect property rights and will not involve the expropriation of land. However, Castillo also stated "Let's end with the bosses and the landowners. They will no longer eat thanks to the sweat of the poor and of the peasants."

On 22 October 2021, the government presented a lawsuit before the Constitutional Court (CT) that Congress' reinterpretation of the question of confidence was unconstitutional. The CT unanimously admitted the case on 28 October 2021. On 2 November 2021, Eloy Espinosa-Saldaña, who was appointed rapporteur of the case, asked Congress to quickly respond to the lawsuit. Meanwhile, the Minister of Justice, Aníbal Torres, claimed that if the CT respected its past judgements, it should declare the unconstitutionality of the law that reinterprets the question of trust.

On 4 November, the General Commander of the Army, José Vizcarra Álvarez, and Jorge Luis Chaparro, the General Commander of the Air Force, were relieved from their duties. Both had served in their positions for three months prior to their removal. On 8 November 2021, Vizcarra claimed that President Castillo, Defense Minister Walter Ayala, and presidential secretary Bruno Pacheco had pressured him to irregularly promote two colonels. Vizcarra claimed that his refusal to promote them led to him being removed as General Commander of the Army.

On 6 November, Free Peru's Regional Secretary Jorge Spelucín claimed that President Castillo had cut off all communication channels with Free Peru. Spelucín claimed that the President's environment was guiding him towards the political center and right, and that Free Peru wanted to help Castillo return to the left. Former Prime Minister Guido Bellido also affirmed that Castillo had cut off communication after the resignation of the Bellido cabinet. Bellido also claimed that Castillo's ideological formation "is not from the left," but rather at "the level of a basic trade unionist."

Subsequently, members from the Congressional opposition denounced the alleged irregularities. They began to prepare a motion of interpellation against the Defense Minister, which would allow Congress to question him on the incident. Jorge Montoya, the spokesperson of Popular Renewal, stated that following the interpellations he would impeach Ayala. Afterward, Ayala stated that he was evaluating resigning as Minister of Defense due to "continuous attacks." However, he denied claims that he had interfered with the promotions.

Afterward, several other generals affirmed that the Secretary of the Presidency had interfered with promotions. Chaparro, the former commander of the Air force, claimed that he had been asked on 3 occasions to promote people who did not have the necessary skills. The leader of Free Peru, Vladimir Cerrón, distanced his party from the scandal, saying that Free Peru does not lead the current government. Meanwhile, Prime Minister Mirtha Vásquez gave a statement, saying that the government respects an attitude of non-interference in the Armed Forces. She stated that "serious" facts were revealed, and that a decision would be announced within the next few hours.

On 8 November, the Interior Ministry claimed that groups consisting of ex-military and ex-police personnel are appearing, many of whom being veterans of the war against the Shining Path. Representatives from said groups and other related groups claimed to have pacifist intentions, citing plans for a march and their right to "freely defend themselves and protest."

On 13 November, Justice Minister Aníbal Torres called on Walter Ayala to resign. Meanwhile, Health Minister Hernando Cevallos stated that Castillo was very annoyed with presidential secretary Bruno Pacheco's behavior, and that he had removed those people who may violate the independence of the armed forces. Additionally, rumors grew that Prime Minister Mirtha Vásquez might resign due to the controversy. In Peruvian law, the resignation of the PM dissolves the entire cabinet. Responding to the rumors, Labor Minister Betssy Chávez said that there was "a lot of speculation" on the matter, but affirmed that the cabinet would work together. Meanwhile, Aníbal Torres downplayed such rumors, saying that he hadn't seen "differences" between Castillo and Vásquez.

On 14 November, Walter Ayala announced his irrevocable resignation. However, the next day, Ayala stated that the resignation would only become effective once Castillo accepted it, and that he would continue working in the meanwhile. Ayala stated that he could not abandon his post since there was no replacement as of then, and accused Congress of not allowing him to work. Later that day, Castillo accepted the resignation of Walter Ayala and thanked him for his services. On 17 November, Juan Carrasco was sworn in as the new Defense Minister. Carrasco had previously been Castillo's Interior Minister during the Bellido cabinet.

In December 2021, prosecutor José Domingo Pérez reported that Keiko Fujimori received one million dollars from the Odebrecht Department of Structured Operations that was delivered through offshore intermediary accounts of Gonzalo Monteverde's company Construmaq. Domingo stated that he held 1,900 pieces of evidence to determine that a criminal group existed within Popular Force.

==== First removal attempt ====
Presented in visitor documents as a lobbyist for the construction company Termirex, Karelim López met with Castillo's chief of staff Bruno Pacheco multiple times. In November 2021, four months into his term, Keiko Fujimori announced that her party was pushing forward impeachment proceedings, arguing that Castillo was "morally unfit for office". That day, investigators raided the Government Palace during an influence peddling investigation and found that Pacheco had US$20,000 present in his office's bathroom. Pacheco said that the money was part of his savings and salary, though he resigned from his position in order to prevent the scandal from affecting Castillo. On 25 November 28 legislators from Fujimori's party presented a signed motion of impeachment to congress, setting up a vote for opening impeachment proceedings against Castillo. A short time later, controversy arose when newspapers reported that Castillo had met with individuals at his former campaign headquarters in Breña without public record, a potential violation of a recently created, complicated set of transparency regulations. Lobbyist Karelim López would also become entangled with the controversy in Breña after the company Terminex, who she lobbied for, won the Tarata III Bridge Consortium contract worth 255.9 million soles. Audios purportedly obtained at the residence and released by América Televisión were criticized and dismissed as a scam. Castillo responded to the impeachment threat stating: "I am not worried about the political noise because the people have chosen me, not the mafias or the corrupt." The impeachment proceeding did not occur, as 76 voted against proceedings, 46 were in favor, and 4 abstained, with a requirement of 52 favoring proceedings not being obtained. Free Peru ultimately supported Castillo through the process and described the vote as an attempted right-wing coup. Castillo responded to the vote stating: "Brothers and sisters, let's end political crises and work together to achieve a just and supportive Peru."

==== Second removal attempt and protests ====
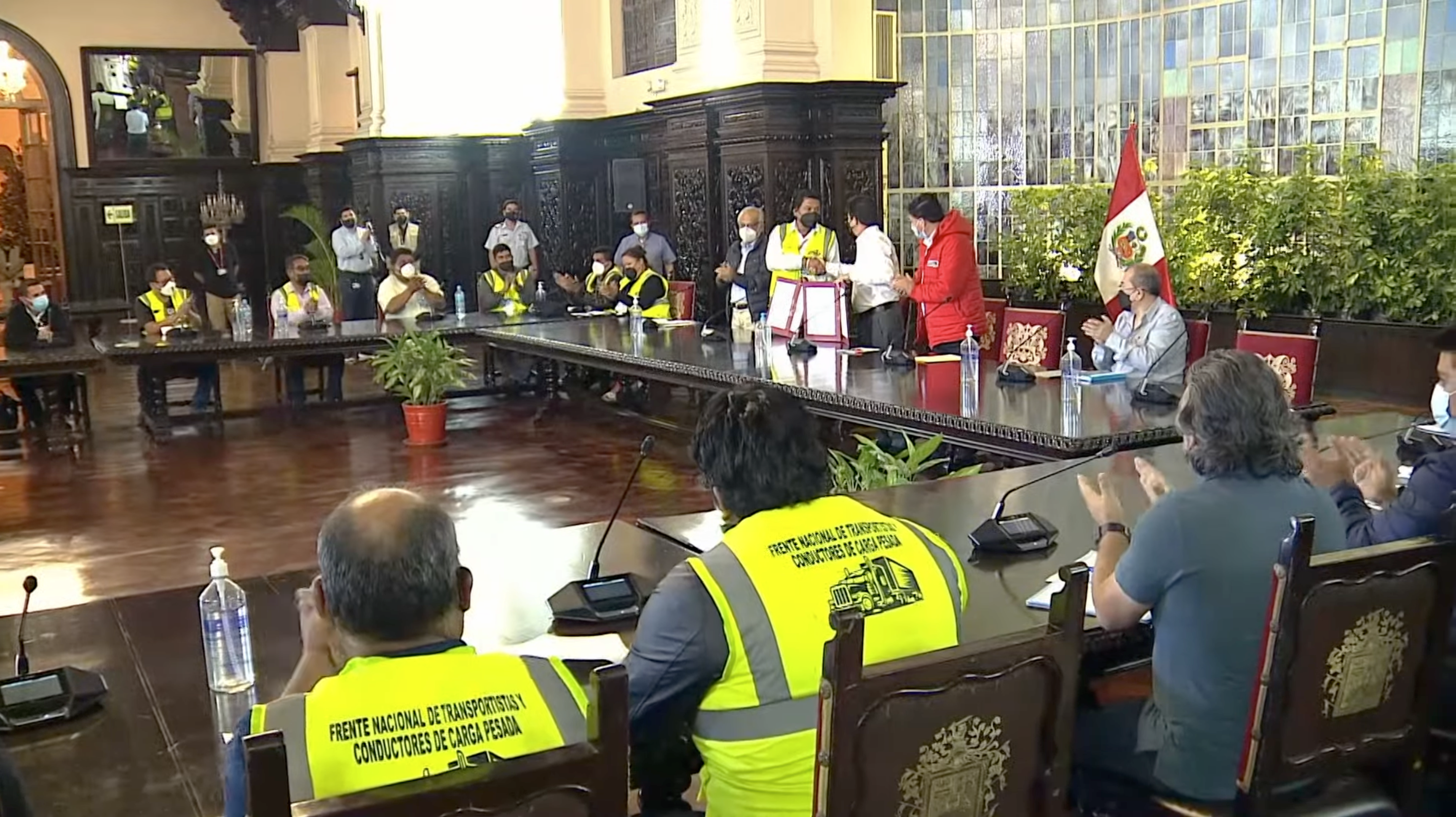
Negotiations between President Pedro Castillo and a trade union in April 2022

In February 2022, it was reported that Fujimorists and politicians close to Fujimori organized a meeting at the Casa Andina hotel in Lima with the assistance of the German liberal group Friedrich Naumann Foundation, with those present including Maricarmen Alva, President of the Congress of the Republic of Peru, discussing plans to remove President Castillo from office. Alva had already shared her readiness to assume the presidency of Peru if Castillo were to be vacated from the position and a leaked Telegram group chat of the Board of Directors of Congress that she heads revealed plans coordinated to oust Castillo. A second impeachment attempt related to corruption allegations did make it to proceedings in March 2022. On 28 March 2022, Castillo appeared before Congress calling the allegations baseless and for legislators to "vote for democracy" and "against instability", with 55 voting for impeachment, 54 voting against, and 19 abstaining, not reaching the 87 votes necessary for impeaching Castillo.

On 1 April, protesters in Junín began to riot, looting stores, ATMs and pharmacies, with authorities announcing that 10 were arrested during the riots. Simultaneously, representatives of the Castillo government travelled through the nation to negotiate with UGTRANM and transportation representatives, though they were turned away. UGTRANM leaders demanded that the Castillo administration lower fuel prices, though the government had already instituted the Fuel Price Stabilization Fund according to economist Jorge Gonzales Izquierdo in order to prevent diesel fuel price hikes. The government removed a fuel tax that added about 30% to prices, though fuel stations refused to lower their prices. UGTRANM's Diez Villegas on 2 April announced a national general strike to occur on 4 April.

On 9 April, President Castillo presented a constitutional amendment proposal to reform Article 61 of the Peruvian constitution, sharing plans on what he said would ban "monopolies, oligopolies, hoarding, speculation or price agreements, as well as the abuse of dominant positions in the market" in order to establish a social market economy.

Despite a truce between the government and some groups, unions in Cusco began protests on 18 April demanding the lowering of prices and the rewriting of the Peruvian constitution, resulting with hundreds of tourists being stranded in some areas.

In July 2022, a fifth inquest was launched into Castillo's alleged involvement in corruption.

On 5 November, thousands of opponents of the government marched through the capital's center to call for the removal of President Pedro Castillo.

==== Self-coup attempt and removal ====
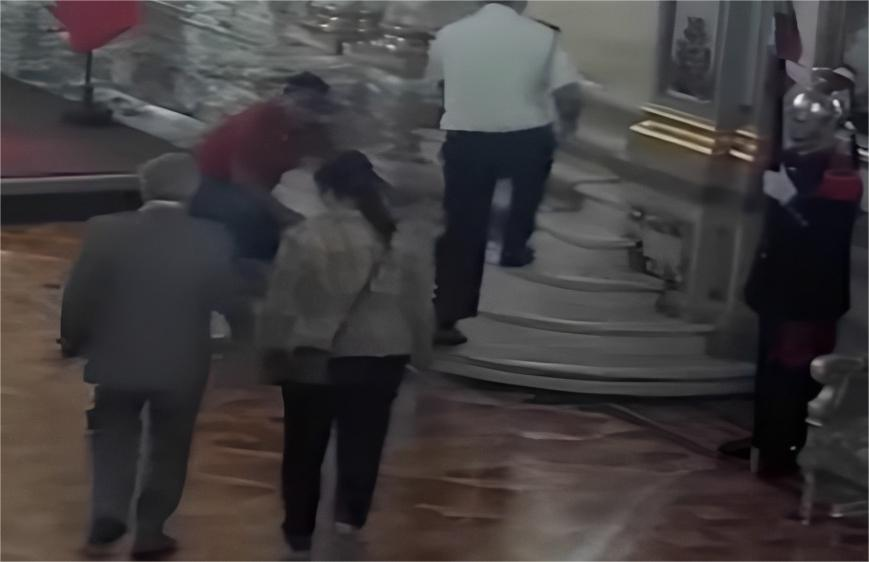
Camera footage showing Aníbal Torres and Betssy Chávez moments before Castillo's declaration.

On 8 November 2022, Prime Minister Aníbal Torres asked Congress to vote on a matter of confidence to reform Law 31355, which would modify the parliamentary procedure to dissolve congress and call congressional elections. Congress shelved the Executive's request for reform, for which on November 11 Castillo warned: “We have declared before Parliament a prerogative of the Executive, as is the question of trust. Today we know the answer. I must announce that the Executive will also give an answer in the next few hours to the Peruvian people."

On 17 November, Torres once again asked Congress to vote on another question of confidence to repeal another law, 31399, which was approved in January 2022 and which modified the referendum. The Government opposed the rule, alleging that it prevented the participation of citizens directly. On November 24, the Board of Directors of Congress rejected the question of confidence. The president of the Congress, José Williams, explained that the President of the Republic cannot attribute an interpretation contrary to that indicated by the Constitution and the regulations of Parliament, doing so would lead to an unconstitutional dissolution of Congress. On the other hand, on 30 November the Constitutional Court declared unfounded the claim of unconstitutionality filed by the Executive Power against Law 31399.

Despite the Government's interpretations of having considered that two questions of trust were allegedly denied, Congressmen and specialists in constitutional law declared that the constitution would be infringed. Reforming a law is the exclusive competence of the Legislature and therefore, only Congress can interpret whether or not trust was denied.

On 24 November, Torres resigned again. It was accepted and Minister of Culture Betssy Chávez was selected by President Castillo to replace him.

On 29 November, the non-grouped congressman Edward Málaga presented the presidential vacancy motion for "moral ineptitude" with 67 signatures, which exceeded the necessary minimum number of 26 signatures. The debate for the admission of the vacancy motion was held on 1 December. When the date arrived, the motion was admitted to debate with 73 votes in favor, 32 against and 6 abstentions, with which the President of the Republic was summoned to the Plenary on 7 December 2022 to exercise his right to defense. The vacancy required a qualified majority (two thirds of the legal number of congressmen, which corresponds to 87 votes in favor of 130); however, various voices considered that the votes were not guaranteed to approve the vacancy, despite this, an unexpected event occurred hours before the session.

On 5 December, just days before Congress was set to vote on impeaching Castillo, a constitutional complaint was filed by the Subcommittee on Constitutional Accusations against Vice President Dina Boluarte, alleging that she operated a private club while she was the Minister of Development. The allegations against Boluarte created the potential for the vice president to face controversy if Castillo were to be impeached.

On 6 December, Chief of the Joint Command General Manuel Gómez de la Torre held a meeting with the branch heads of the armed forces of Peru. During the meeting, General Gómez de la Torre warned the branch heads of a pending conflict, stating "I am responsible. There are no other orders". Commanding general of the Army of Peru, Wálter Córdova, also submitted his resignation on 6 December, with the submission being approved the next morning.

On 7 December, Congress was expected to file a motion of censure against Castillo, accusing him of "permanent moral incapacity". Before the legislative body could gather to file its motion, Castillo announced the dissolution of Congress and enacted an immediate curfew. In his speech, Castillo stated:

[T]he majority of Congress, which defends the interests of the big monopolies and oligopolies, has done everything to try to destroy the institution of the presidency ... The Executive has sent to Congress more than 70 bills of national interest with the aim of benefiting the most vulnerable sectors of the population, such as the Massification of Gas, the creation of the Ministry of Science and Technology and Innovation, Free Admission to Universities, the Second Agrarian Reform, the Tax Reform, the Reform of the Justice System, the elimination of the subsidiary economic activity of the State Congress sought to prosecute the president for treason with unsustainable and absurd arguments from one of constitutionalist jurists, ... Without the slightest evidence, Congress charged the president with crimes many times, often based on claims made by a mercenary, corrupt and cynical press, which defames and slanders in absolute debauchery. However, the congress does not investigate and sanction criminal acts of its own members. Congress has destroyed the rule of law, democracy, separation, and balance of powers by modifying the Constitution with ordinary laws to destroy the Executive and establish a congressional dictatorship with the endorsement, as they themselves state, of the Constitutional Court. ... The following measures are dictated: to temporarily dissolve the Congress of the Republic and establish an exceptional emergency government. Elections will be called for a new Congress with constituent powers to draft a new Constitution within no more than nine months.

He then called on individuals possessing illegal weapons to deliver them to the National Police within 72 hours and ordered all troops of the Peruvian Army to remain at their barracks, saying that he did not want clashes between citizens and the military.

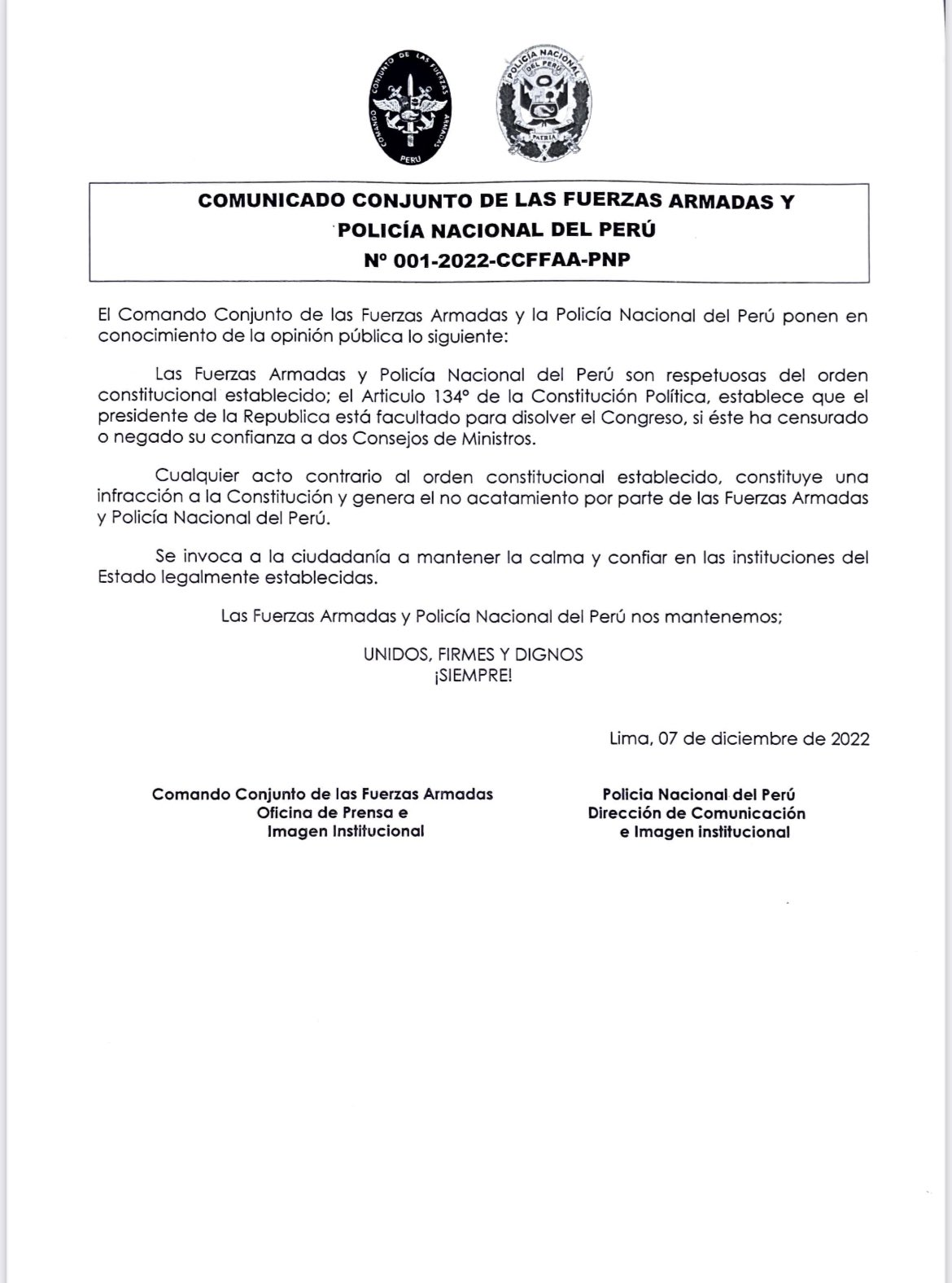
Document of the CCFFAA and PNP rejecting the actions of Castillo

The Constitutional Court released a statement following the coup: "No one owes obedience to a usurping government and Mr. Pedro Castillo has made an ineffective coup d'état. The Armed Forces are empowered to restore the constitutional order." The Armed Forces also issued a statement rejecting Castillo's actions and calling for the maintenance of stability in Peru. Democratic institutions and civil society quickly rejected Castillo's actions, Moments after Castillo's speech, multiple ministers resigned from his government, including Prime Minister Betssy Chávez.

Rejecting Castillo's actions to dissolve the legislative body, Congress gathered and voted to remove Castillo from office due to "moral incapacity" with 101 votes in favor, 6 against and 10 abstentions. It was announced that First Vice President Dina Boluarte, who rejected Castillo's actions, would take her oath of office for the presidency at 3:00 pm PET.

President Castillo then fled the Government Palace and contacted president of Mexico Andrés Manuel López Obrador, raising concerns about political asylum. According to President López Obrador, it was likely that Castillo's phone was tapped by Peruvian intelligence, with the Mexican president reporting that Peruvian authorities entered the grounds of the Mexican embassy to prevent Castillo from entering. Castillo said that he did not seek to leave Peru and only wanted to drop his family off at the Mexican embassy for their safety. Upon learning that Castillo was seeking to enter the Mexican embassy, the general of the PNP learned that his officers were the drivers for Castillo and ordered them to deliver Castillo to the Prefecture where he would be arrested. Individuals gathered outside the Mexican embassy in Lima to block the area upon rumors that Castillo was attempting to flee to seek asylum in Mexico. The PNP officers driving Castillo said that they had to make an emergency detour, later bringing him to the Prefecture where he was greeted by the head of the PNP, who arrested him, in flagrante delicto, for rebellion.

Castillo's vice president Dina Boluarte entered the Legislative Palace shortly after 3:00 pm PET and appeared before Congress, where she was later sworn in as president of Peru. Following Castillo's removal, his supporters started nationwide protests demanding his release and Boluarte's resignation.

While Castillo was detained, he denounced a "Machiavellian plan" against him by the National Prosecutor Patricia Benavides, Congress and his former vice president Boluarte. Some Latin American media organizations linked the events to United States Ambassador to Peru Lisa D. Kenna, a former member of the Central Intelligence Agency. Ambassador Kenna had met with Castillo's defense minister, Gustavo Bobbio, the day before the impeachment vote, raising concerns about the United States being involved in the events. Local media also reported that the President of Congress and former head of the Peruvian armed forces, José Williams, allegedly collaborated with Ambassador Kenna.

=== Boluarte presidency ===
==== Protests ====
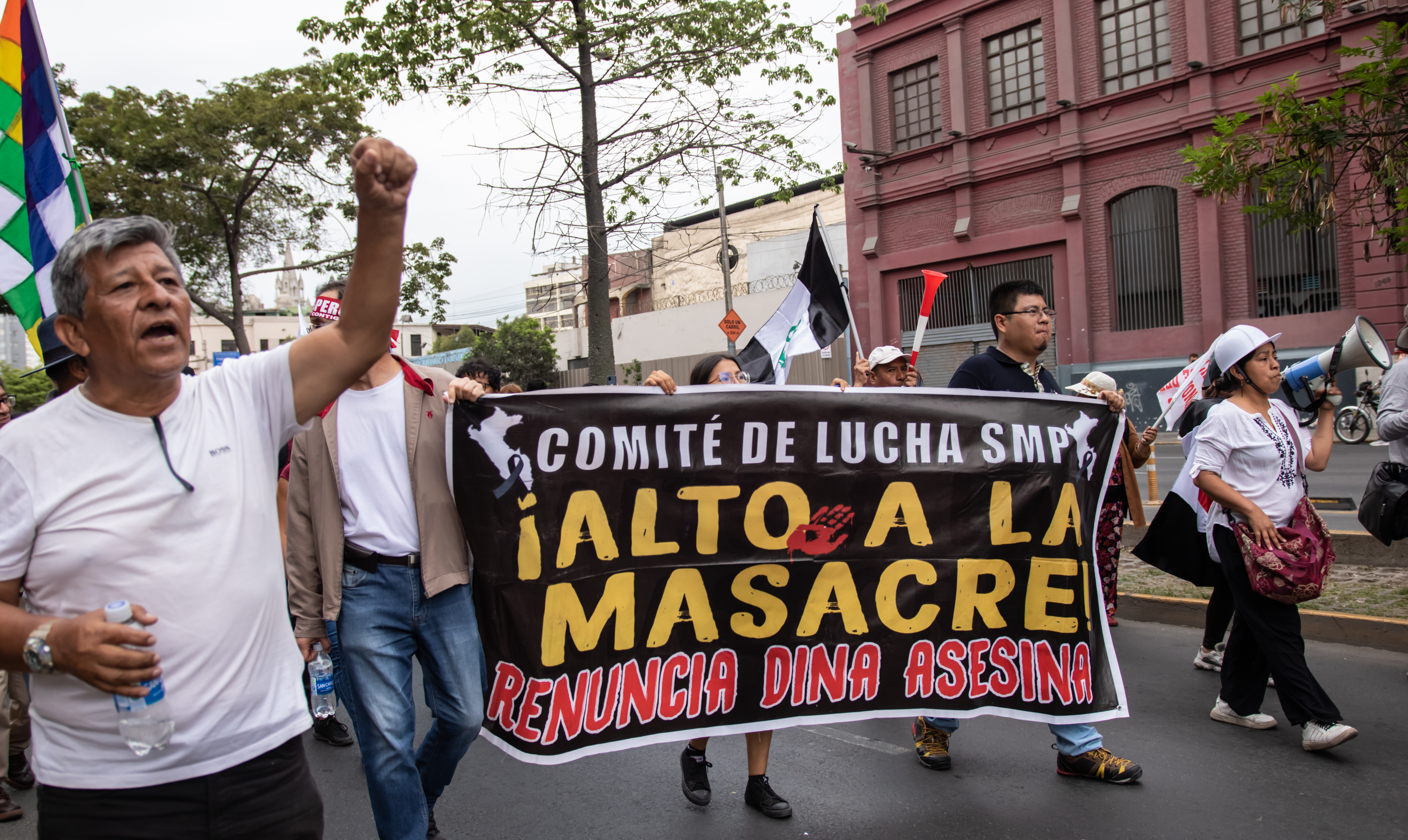
Protesters denouncing the government's use of violence, January 2023

Following Castillo's removal, his supporters started nationwide protests demanding his release and Boluarte's resignation. On 14 December, the government declared a 30-day state of emergency. On 16 December, the sixth day of government, the two Ministers of Education and Culture Patricia Correa and Jair Pérez announced their resignation, in opposition to the outbreak of the state of emergency in the country and the numerous deaths during the demonstrations in favor of Pedro Castillo, whose death toll worsened the same day, with 18 dead, confirmed by the Minister of Health Rosa Gutiérrez. Protests erupted into violence on 11 December near the southern city of Andahuaylas where demonstrators closed the airport, with police in a helicopter reportedly firing upon protesters, killing two individuals. President Boluarte attempted to appease protests by proposing elections two years early, for April 2024, though Castillo supporters rejected the call while Castillo described such actions as a "dirty game". Congress would reject Boluarte's proposal for early elections. However, Congress reconsidered the proposal on 21 December 2022 and allowed the discussion of early elections to begin in 2023. Police brutality against protesters led to the Juliaca massacre on 9 January 2023. Attorney General of Peru Patricia Benavides announced investigations the following day to determine if Boluarte, Prime Minister Alberto Otárola, Minister of the Interior Víctor Rojas, and Minister of Defense Jorge Chávez committed genocide and aggravated homicide. Groups in Congress opposed to Boluarte opened an impeachment motion against her on 25 January, citing moral incapacity.

===== Violence =====
Violence during the protests were often concentrated in rural areas, which were considered a stronghold for protests. Many protesters declared themselves in an insurgency, while the rondas campesinas led a peaceful campaign of strikes against the government. Both the Peruvian Armed Forces and the Peruvian Police widely suppressed the protests, often with impunity.

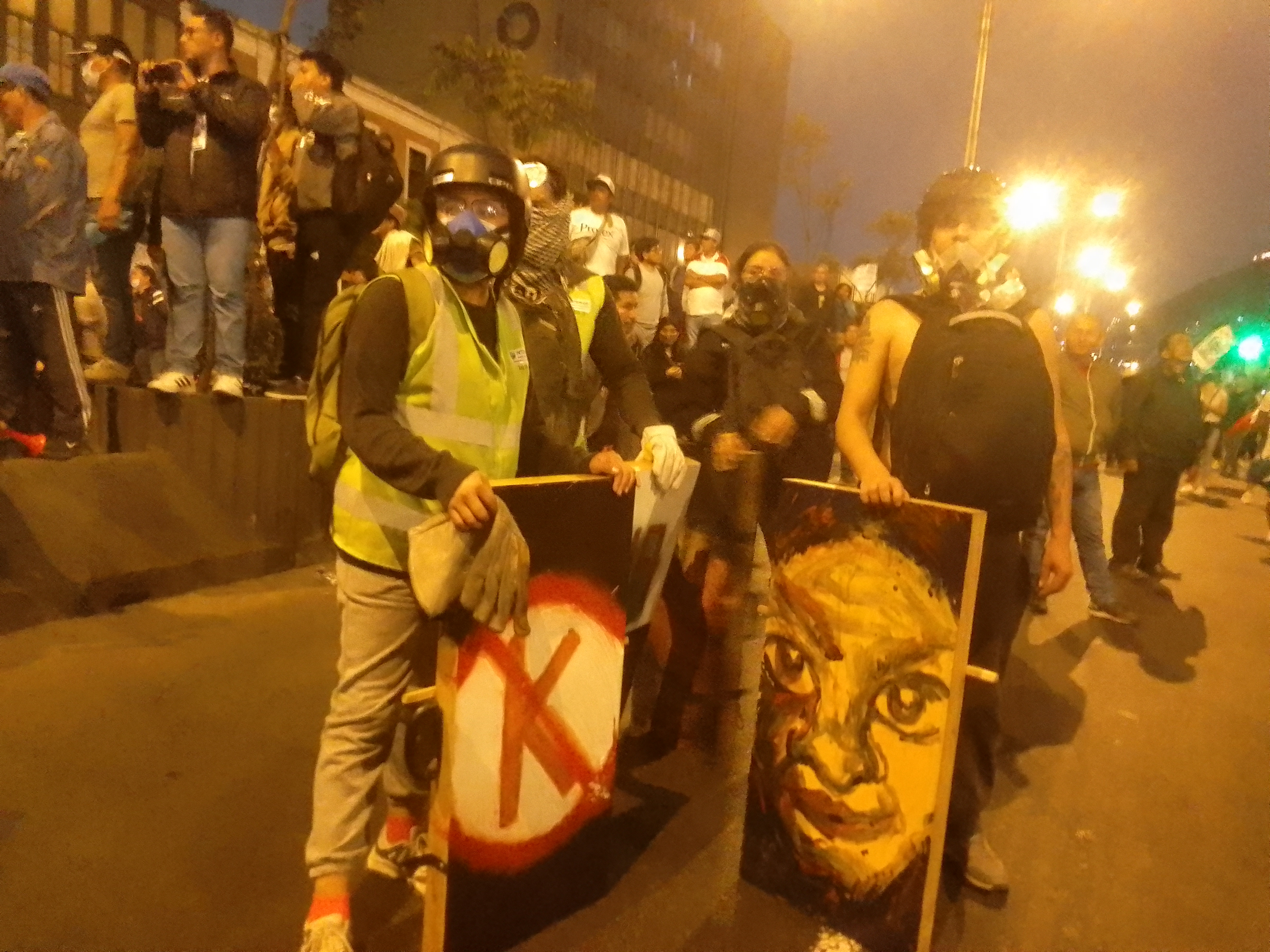
Protests against Fujimorism and the Boluarte administration in July 2023

The region of Puno was heavily affected during the violence, especially during the Juliaca massacre, where eighteen people were killed by the National Police of Peru. Puno also suffered directly from blockades, looting, and other types of unrest. Apurímac also suffered heavily during the unrest. Protests in the city of Andahuaylas exploded into violence on 11 December 2022 followed by ensuing clashes by the Peruvian Army and local protesters in the city. The Madre de Dios region in the southwest was also blockaded by protesters, with the blockade eventually being lifted by the Peruvian Armed Forces. Other clashes and deadly incidents took place in the regions of Ica, Arequipa, Ayacucho, and Junín.

==== Fujimorists' consolidation of power ====
Fujimorism would ultimately consolidate governmental power into Congress with the assistance of the Constitutional Court of Peru. The Constitutional Court would remove judicial oversight of Congress, essentially giving the legislative body absolute control of Peru's government. The politicization of the armed forces also raised concerns about a developing civilian-military government in Peru. Congress, with one-third of its members belonging to a far-right bloc, would reject all attempts of reform, including the advancing of general elections, constitutional proposals and motions to impeach Boluarte. while the Supreme Court of Peru would further rule on 18 May 2023 that protesting in Peru was illegal and that it was not protected by the constitution. Calls for future protests in July 2023 were made amidst the controversial verdict of the Supreme Court.

By May 2023, Fujimorists gained control of the Office of the Public Defender and other institutions. In September 2023, Fujimorists in Congress would attempt to restructure the National Board of Justice (JNJ). The move was condemned as a "parliamentary coup" by newspaper La República and by NGOs like the Center for Justice and International Law (CEJIL), Due Process of Law Foundation, Fundación Construir, Fundación para la Justicia y el Estado Democrático de Derecho (FJEDD), Human Rights Watch, the International Commission of Jurists, Observatorio Derechos y Justicia (ODJ), Robert F. Kennedy Human Rights and the Washington Office on Latin America, with the latter group demanding the application of the Inter-American Democratic Charter.

On 30 July 2024, Boluarte's government was challenged by Peru's top prosecutor office which filed a complaint against Boluarte's government for the murder of 44 protestors during the 2022–2023 protests. On 12 August 2024, Peru passed a bill which prevented the prosecution of crimes against humanity committed by government between 1980 and 2000, in what was seen as a bill which would benefit former dictator Alberto Fujimori who was in power between 1990 and 2000 and planned to stand in the 2026 elections, though he would later die a month later after the bill was passed.

=== Jeri and Balcázar presidencies ===
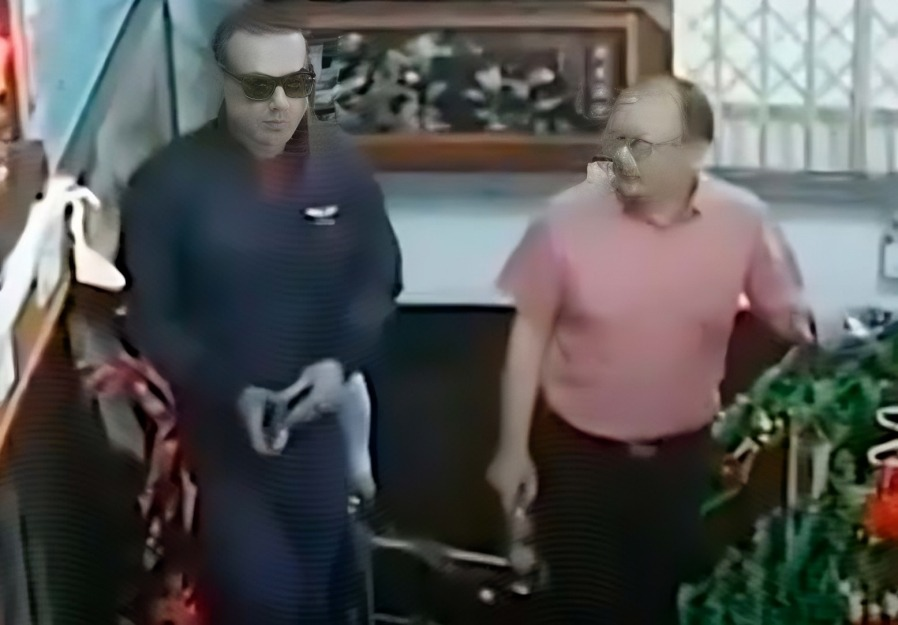
José Jerí meeting clandestinely with Chinese businessman Zhihua Yang in January 2026.

Amidst the 2025 Peruvian protests and after the unanimous impeachment and removal of Dina Boluarte on 10 October 2025, owing to persistent political scandals throughout her presidency and a mismanaged crime wave earlier in the month, José Jerí immediately ascended as President of Peru. With Boluarte having no vice presidents, Jerí, as president of the legislature, stood next in the line of succession established in the Peruvian Constitution. He became the eighth individual to serve as President since the resignation of Pedro Pablo Kuczynski in 2018, a span of just over seven years.

Jeri presidency was highly controversial and lasted only four months. On 14 February 2026, it was announced that Jerí was under investigation for illicit enrichment for a second time. He was accused of influence peddling after the revelation of secretive meetings with Chinese businessmen outside of any official framework. Three days later, on 17 February, Jerí was removed from the presidency by the Peruvian Congress in a 75-24 vote, with 3 abstentions, following a motion of censure approved weeks before the general elections. He was removed as President of Congress after he failed to disclose meetings with Chinese businessmen who were under government scrutiny. He was only president for four months.

José María Balcázar was sworn in as his successor until the general election which Keiko Fujimori won. A post-election crisis followed as a result of logistical problems on the part of the National Office of Electoral Processes (ONPE) in the Lima Metropolitan Region. The far-right party Popular Renewal (Renovación Popular) attempted to overturn the results, claiming a supposed electoral fraud, but this had no results.

Results of the 2026 elections. The regions that supported Castillo in 2021 were the same ones that supported Sánchez.

As in the 2021 elections, almost no candidate managed to reach even 10% of the vote. The leading candidates, Keiko Fujimori and Roberto Sánchez, received only 14.26% and 9.99%, respectively (17% and 12% of the valid votes). In fact, the amount of blank and invalid votes (17%) was higher that any of the candidates, just as in the 2021 election. The fragmentation was exacerbated by the excessive number of political parties. There were a total of 36 parties, twice as in 2021. This was a direct consequence of the Boluarte administration, which eliminated the "PASO" elections (Open, Simultaneous, and Mandatory Primary elections), a filter created precisely to prevent such scenario. The decision was criticized by several experts, as it limited citizen participation and would result in extreme fragmentation, making it so that the next president's political representation would be "5 or 10% at most".

The second round between Keiko Fujimori and Roberto Sánchez was once again marked by intense polarization. Fujimori ultimately won the presidency by just 0.26% of the vote—roughly 40,000 votes—while Sánchez refused to recognize the result, extending the post-election dispute.

=== Keiko Fujimori presidency ===
On 28 July 2026, Keiko Fujimori was sworn in as Peru’s president. In September 2026, Peru joined the “Shield of the Americas”, a regional security alliance led by the United States.

== Effects ==
=== Economic ===
During the 2023 unrest, the main economic sectors of the Peruvian economy largely ceased during the protests. Three weeks into protests, the National Chamber of Tourism (Canatur) reported that due to protests, Peru had lost an estimated 1.7 billion soles($450 million USD) of tourism income since the start of the demonstrations. A month into protests, some stores in Lima were reporting a 60% decrease in sales compared to the previous year. According to the Boluarte government, Peru experienced $1.3 billion of infrastructure damage from protests by late January. On 31 January 2023, Moody's Investors Service changed Peru's credit rating outlook to "Negative", citing "a deterioration in institutional cohesion, governability, policy effectiveness and economic strength through successive governments". In August 2023, it was announced that the country had entered a recession.

=== Foreign Policy ===
Nations recognizing presidential governments Pedro Castillo Dina Boluarte

During the 2020 protests, both El Salvador and Venezuela refused to recognize the legitimacy of Manuel Merino's government, with Salvadoran President Nayib Bukele calling it a "government of coup plotters".

After Castillo's removal from power, a new shakeup occurred in regards to Peru's foreign relations after Mexico said that it would continue to recognize Castillo as Peru's president. Other countries, including Colombia, Venezuela, Honduras, Argentina, and Cuba, recognized Castillo as the legitimate president of Peru following the events of the constitutional crisis. Following unrest, relations with the United States would also sour following a letter from 15 members of the United States Congress that criticized the Peruvian government and the Congress of the Republic due to their undemocratic nominations of the Constitutional Court and the Ombudsman Office. Throughout 2023, United States President Joe Biden would also be criticized due to his support for the Boluarte government. Relations with Spain and Brazil soured as well following a rejection of arms sales due to violence.

=== Democratic backsliding and corruption ===
Since the turmoil began, Peru has undergone significant democratic backsliding during the presidencies of Manuel Merino, Pedro Castillo, and Dina Boluarte, with those governments often being described as authoritarian and corrupt. Even during the presidencies of Pedro Pablo Kuczynski, Martín Vizcarra, and Francisco Sagasti, Peru was seen as a backsliding democracy due to the obstructionist efforts of the Congress of the Republic.

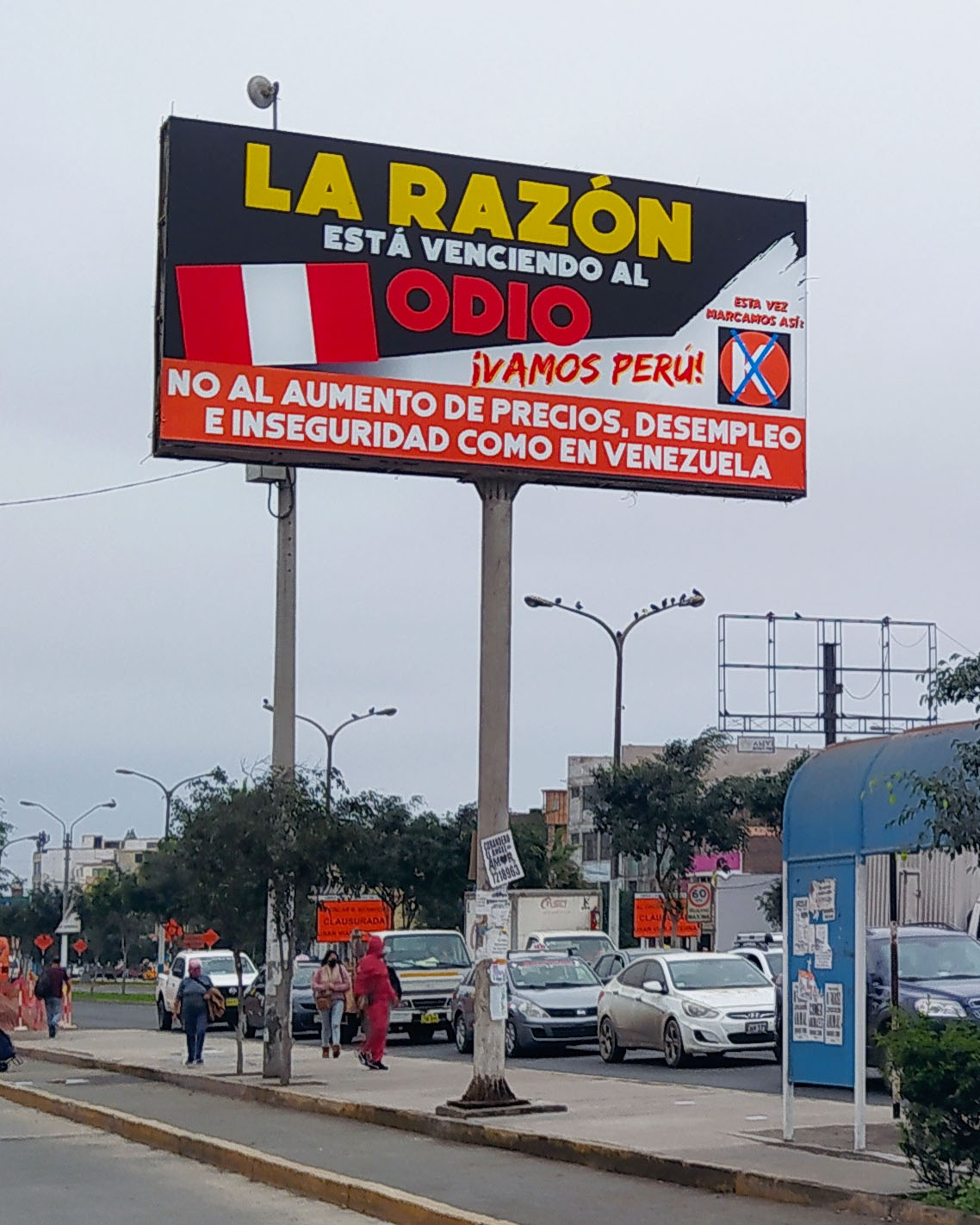
A billboard during the 2021 general elections supporting Fujimorism and Fujimori's fearmongering campaign

During the presidency of Kuczynski, Congress's obstructionist efforts and corruption scandals plagued his public image and was evident as seen following the Pardon of Alberto Fujimori. Kuczynski was also under investigation due to his links to the Odebrecht scandal and other offshore monetary affairs. Corruption within the state continued following Fujimori's pardon, and following Kuczynski's second impeachment attempt, he would resign following a vote buying scandal. As a result, his successor Martín Vizcarra would lead an anti-corruption campaign, which was heavily obstructed by Congress. However, it would be revealed in 2020 that Vizcarra himself had been implicated in several corruption scandals during his early political career, which would result in his removal. The ascension of Merino to the presidency was controversial, as it was believed Vizcarra's impeachment was done for political favors. Merino would go on and form a right-wing government and would repress protests harshly, after which he would resign under pressure. Merino was criticized even more after he left office due to the apparent use of police brutality during the unrest.

Former presidents that have been subject to corruption investigations

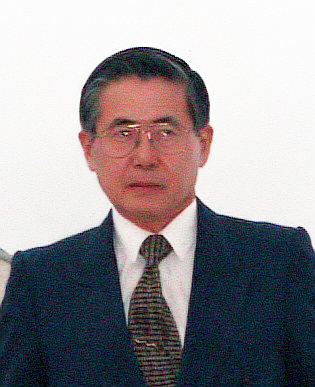
Alberto Fujimori
(1990-2000)
Extradited and convicted

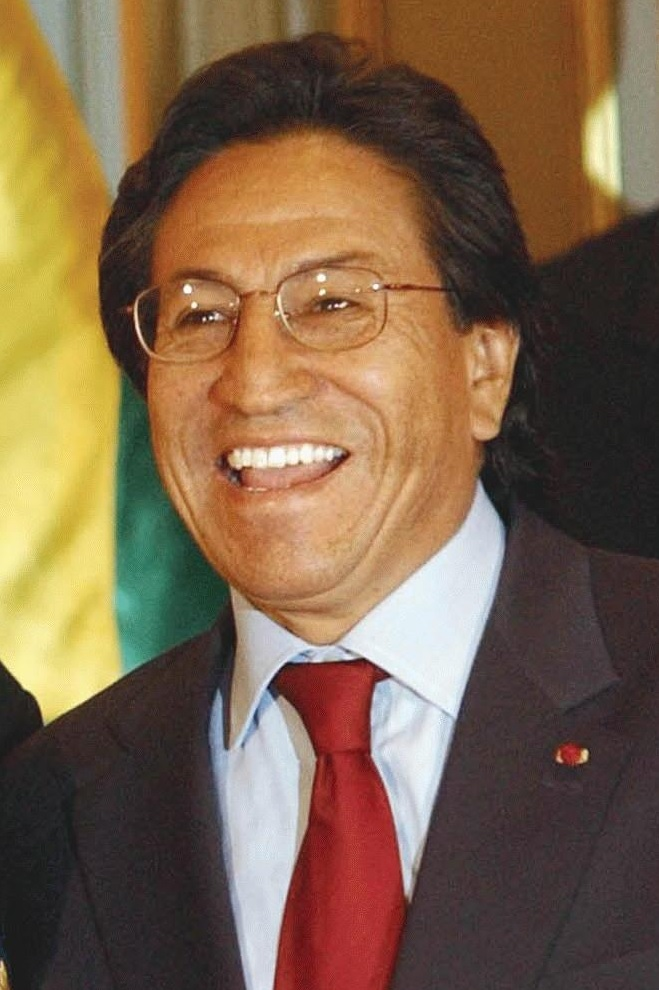
Alejandro Toledo
(2001-2006)
Extradited and convicted

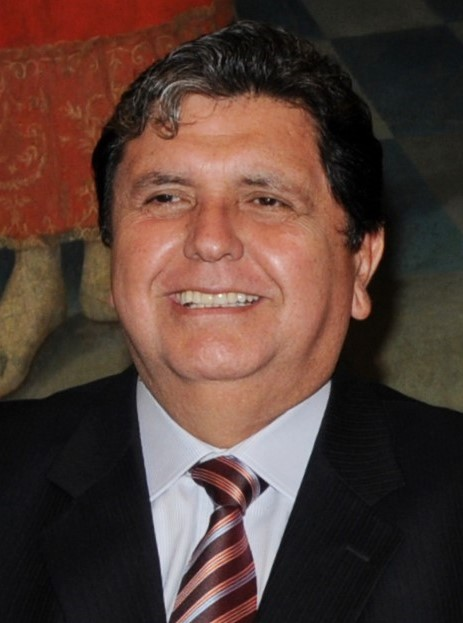
Alan García
(1985-1990, 2006-2011)
Under investigation until his suicide

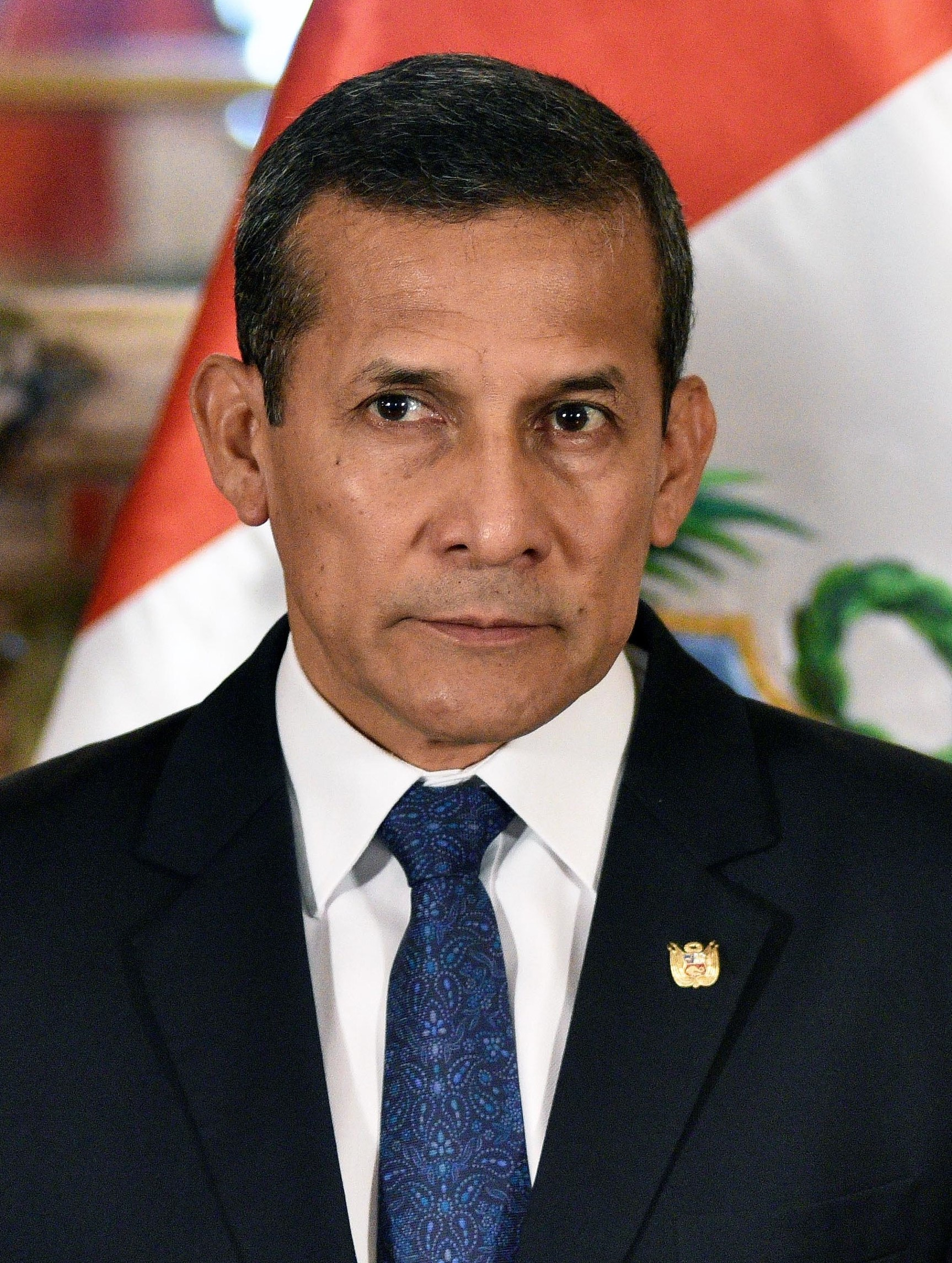
Ollanta Humala
(2011-2016)
Convicted

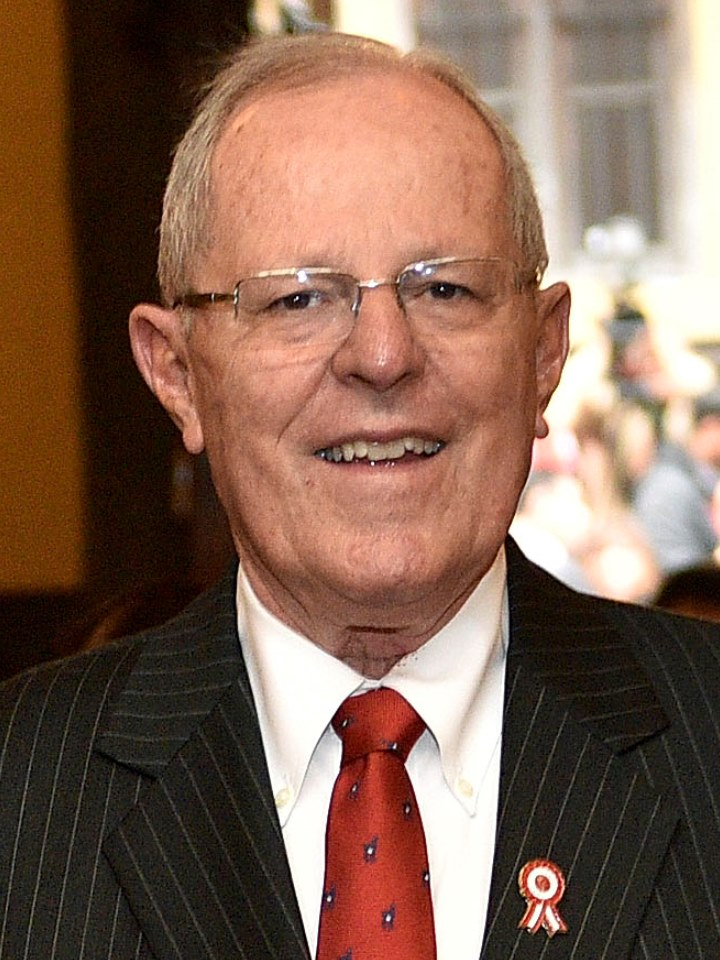
Pedro Pablo Kuczynski
(2016-2018)
Under investigation

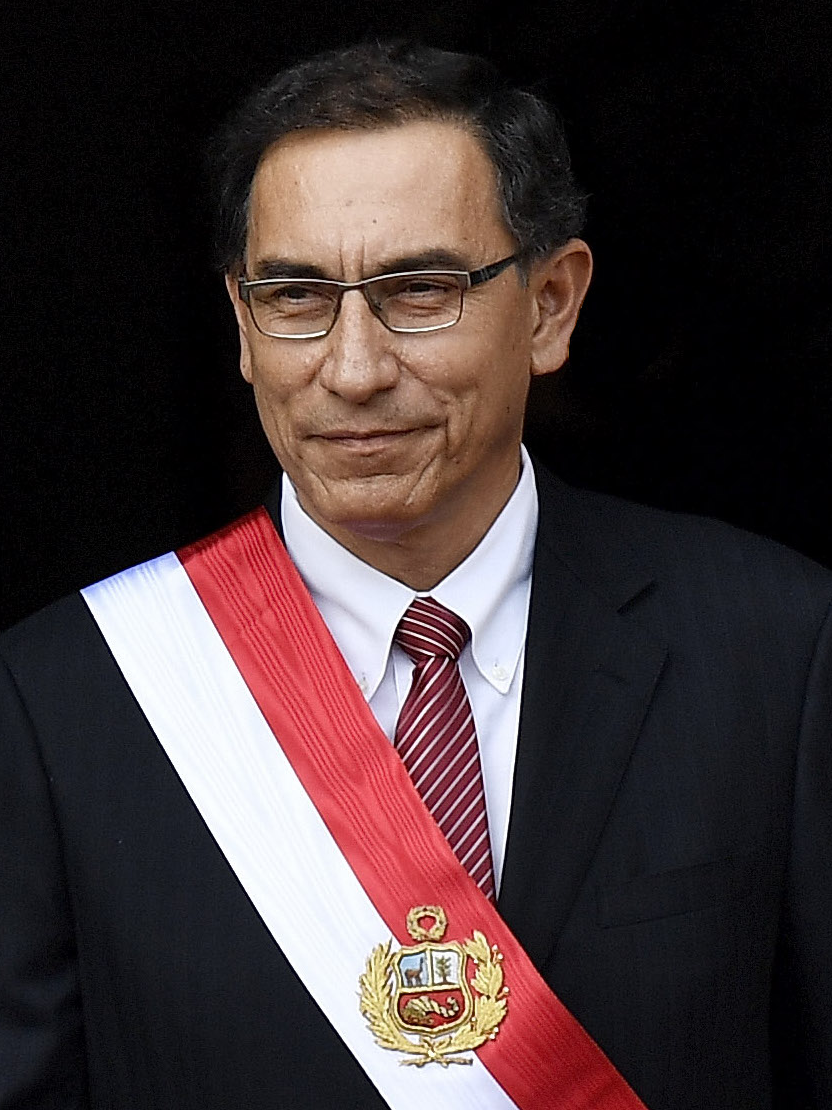
Martín Vizcarra
(2018-2020)
Convicted and banned from public office

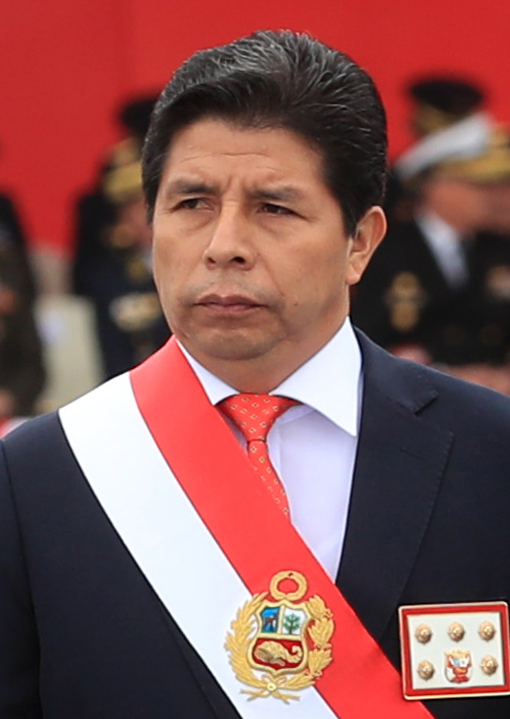
Pedro Castillo
(2021-2022)
Convicted

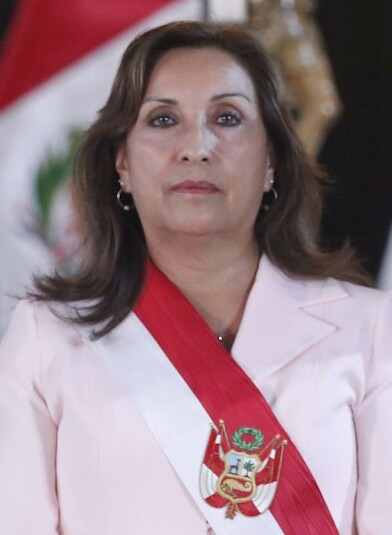
Dina Boluarte
(2022–2025)
Under investigation

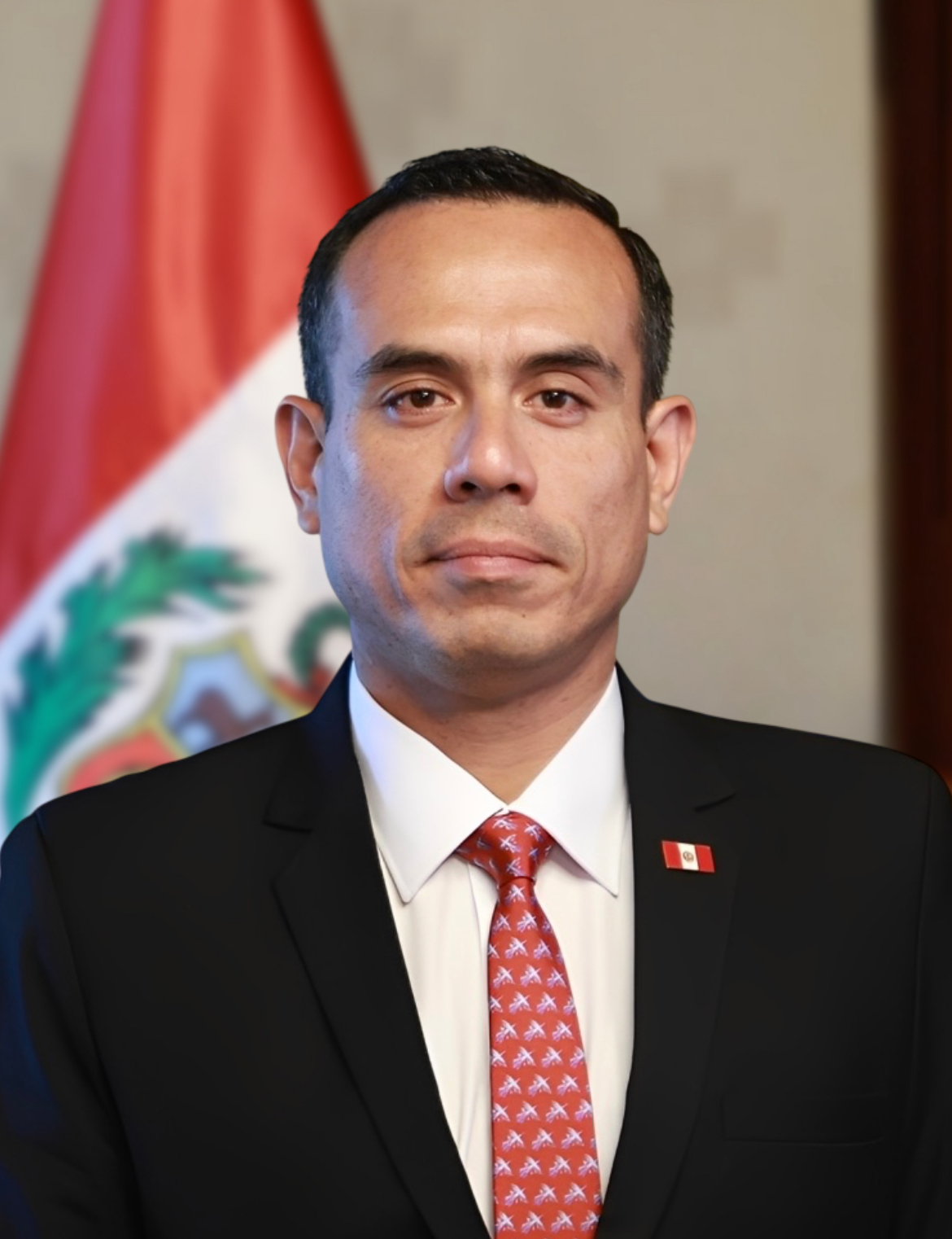
José Jerí
(2025–2026)
Under investigation

During the 2021 Peruvian general election, Keiko Fujimori's campaign was criticized for being antidemocratic and launching a smear campaign against eventual winner Pedro Castillo, using racism and the terruqueo to damage his reputation. Following Castillo's victory against her, Fujimori and her allies would attempt to overturn the election by making unverified claims of electoral fraud. Fujimori also came under controversy after it was revealed that former SIN leader Vladimiro Montesinos, who is imprisoned, was involved in the campaign to overturn the election. On 19 July, following Fujimori's concession, the National Office of Electoral Processes confirmed Castillo's victory. However, Castillo's presidency was marred with corruption scandals and several probes were launched against him. Congress also heavily obstructed much of his actions, specifically done by the far-right bloc led by Popular Force, Popular Renewal, and Advance Country. Castillo's actions were also seen as undemocratic following protests against his administration. His undemocratic actions continued during his third impeachment process, in which he executed a self-coup, which was criticized domestically and internationally as antidemocratic and authoritarian, which led to his removal.

Dina Boluarte's presidency was seen as authoritarian following heavy repression of unrest. Fujimorists began to pack government institutions through sham nominations into the Constitutional Court and the Ombudsman office. Other governmental institutions like the Supreme Court also showed bias towards the Boluarte administration, specifically after the ban on protests in May 2023.

==== Media censorship ====
During the 2021 general election, major media outlets were accused of outright support for Keiko Fujimori's campaign and her fear mongering campaign against Pedro Castillo.

The National Association of Journalists indicated that 21 journalists were victims of aggression between 7 and 11 December. Journalists interviewed by Wayka reported that authorities would frequently attack press workers and would attempt to prevent photographers from capturing images of individuals being detained. Similar incidents of authorities preventing journalists from documenting the protests were collected by OjoPúblico. One photojournalist for the EFE, Aldair Mejía reported that he was threatened by police during a protest in Juliaca, saying that an officer told him "I'll blow off your head and you get out of here dead"; Mejía was later shot in the leg by police while covering protests.

The media in Peru was also criticized for overlooking the massacres at Ayacucho and Juliaca.

External videos
- A video showing police shooting a protester in the head with a tear gas canister, medical volunteers providing aid and the testimony of one of the responders on YouTube

Following the death of a protester on 28 January 2023, journalist Carlos Cornejo of the state-owned TV Perú reported to audiences, stating "It's good news that the roads have been opened. Some bad news: the murder of a citizen at the hands of the police. ... They will want to tell us that it was a stone, they will want to tell us that it was not them, they will want to say anything, but the images do not lie: we all saw that the police killed Victor Santisteban". The government would attempt to deny that police killed the protester. Despite two videos showing the protester being shot in the head with a tear gas canister, General Victor Zanabria of the Peruvian National Police said it was "not yet determined" what killed the protester. Following Cornejo's report on the death of the protester, the National Institute of Radio and Television of Peru (IRTP), the parent company of TV Perú, refused to renew the reporter's contract on 31 January. According to the National Association of Journalists of Peru (ANP), the actions against Cornejo were "an indicted and arbitrary dismissal", stating "In circumstances in which, from all media, and essentially state media, it is imperative to guarantee a plurality of approaches and voices to promote public debate. Extinguishing critical positions can even constitute censorship".

==== Violence and Human Rights concerns ====
- Authorities shooting a protester in the head with a tear gas canister

Violence in Peru during the political crisis has risen, specifically during the presidencies of Pedro Castillo and Dina Boluarte as their respective governments battled unrest against them.

The Peruvian government has had a history of human rights abuses during Operation Condor and the internal Conflict in Peru, led mostly by Francisco Morales Bermúdez and Alberto Fujimori, respectively. Within those periods, fear mongering in the media was high, as were enforced disappearances, extrajudicial executions, and massacres. The Peruvian Armed Forces have a history of impunity; between 2003 and 2020, the armed forces were responsible for 167 deaths, while the perpetrators received little to no consequences for their actions. The government first participated in protest violence during the 2020 Peruvian protests, in which 2 deaths were reported. Reports of police brutality and political repression were widely reported to the media, and ultimately stopped after President Manuel Merino resigned. Reports of violence came to light again during the 2021 general election, in which members of the neofascist La Resistencia Dios, Patria y Familia clashed with members of the far-left Free Peru. La Resistencia also attempted a January 6-type attack on the Government Palace, which was repelled by police. Following the victory of Pedro Castillo as president and his assumption to the post, La Resistancia advocated for his overthrow and participated in attacks against his government, aligning themselves with the far-right Congress. The group also attacked journalists.

Following Castillo's removal in December 2022 and the beginning of protests, the government of Dina Boluarte participated in human rights abuses, with her forces allegedly using torture, unauthorized intrusions, police brutality, political repression, extrajudicial killings, and massacres. The abuses also allegedly constituted racism, disproportionately affecting impoverished indigenous communities. The participation of La Resistencia in violence against protesters also brought more controversy on top of the government repression.

== Bibliography ==
- Asensio, Raúl; Camacho, Gabriela; González, Natalia; Grompone, Romeo; Pajuelo Teves, Ramón; Peña Jimenez, Omayra; Moscoso, Macarena; Vásquez, Yerel; Sosa Villagarcia, Paolo (August 2021). El Profe: Cómo Pedro Castillo se convirtió en presidente del Perú y qué pasará a continuación (in Spanish) (1st ed.). Lima, Peru: Institute of Peruvian Studies. pp. 27–71. ISBN 978-612-326-084-2.
- Calderón, Andrés (2022). PolítiKa vs. Prensa: Una relación tóxica en en tiempos convulsionados. Lima: Penguin Random House. ISBN 9786124272950.
