= Judgment of the Constitutional Court of Peru over the dissolution of Congress on 30 September 2019 =

Case over the dissolution of Congress EXP N° 0006-2019-CC/TC
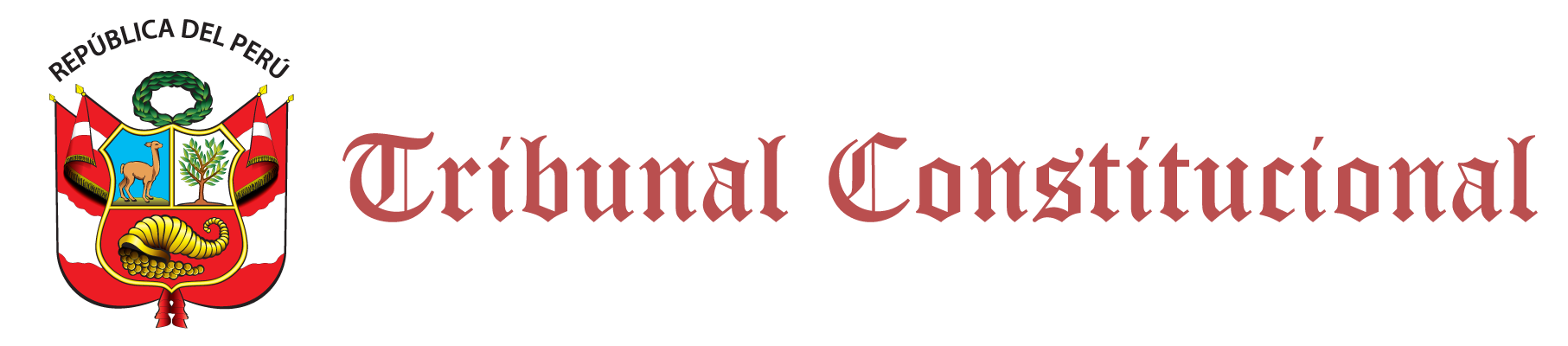
- Court: Constitutional Court of Peru
- Decided: 9 January 2020
- Citations: 0006-2018-PI/TC; Constitution of Peru
- Transcript: 0006-2019-CC/TC

Court membership
- Judges sitting: Marianella Ledesma; Augusto Ferrero Costa; Manuel Miranda Canales; Ernesto Blume; Carlos Ramos Núñez; José Luis Sardón; Eloy Espinosa-Saldaña

Case opinions
- Decision by: Majority
- Concurrence: 4
- Dissent: 3

Keywords
- Motion of confidence

The Judgment of the Constitutional Court of Peru over the dissolution of Congress on 30 September 2019 was court ruling determining that the actions of President of Peru Martín Vizcarra dissolving the Congress of Peru were legal within the laws outlined in the Constitution of Peru. The judgement would build upon previous rulings, determining that Congress could not regulate the motion of no confidence.

== Background ==
=== 2019 Peruvian constitutional crisis ===
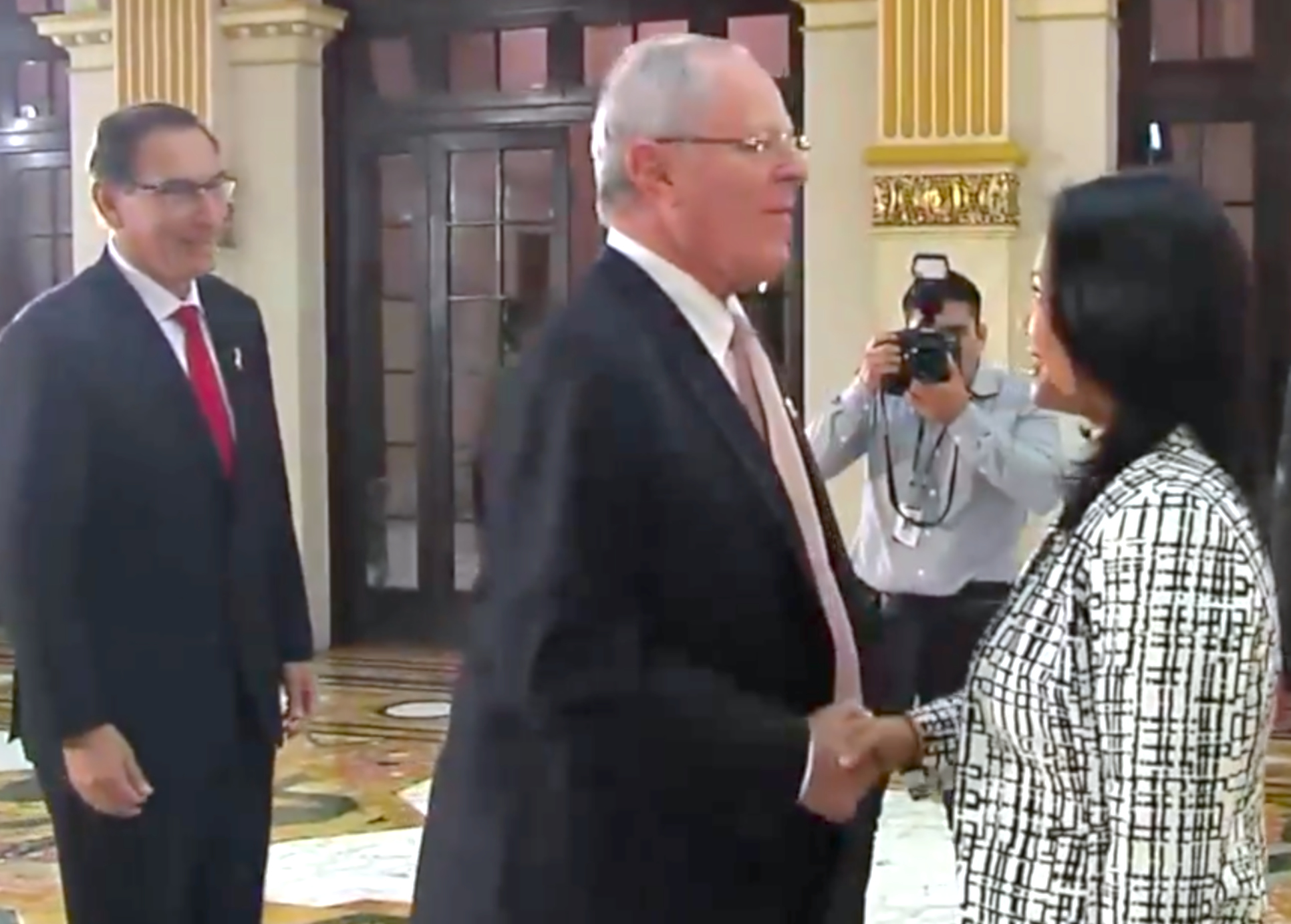
Keiko Fujimori meeting with President Pedro Pablo Kuczynski and Vice President Martín Vizcarra in 2017

The presidency of Peru and the Congress of Peru were in conflict since the beginning of the tenure of former President Pedro Pablo Kuczynski in 2016. During their majority in congress, Fujimorists, led by Keiko Fujimori, "earned a reputation as hardline obstructionists for blocking initiatives popular with Peruvians aimed at curbing the nation’s rampant corruption" according to the Associated Press. On 15 September 2017, Congress passed, by a wide margin, a motion of no confidence against the prime minister and the cabinet, leading to a complete overhaul of the cabinet and appointment of a new prime minister. Following the release of the Kenjivideos reportedly showing Kuczynski making deals with opposition politicians to avoid impeachment votes, President Kuczynski resigned.

Martín Vizcarra, Kuczynski's first vice president, then assumed office in March 2018. President Vizcarra enacted a constitutional process on 29 May 2019 that would create a motion of no confidence towards Congress if they refused to cooperate with his proposed actions against corruption. For the next four months, Congress delayed bills targeting corruption and postponed general elections proposed by Vizcarra. On 30 September 2019, the President of the Council of Ministers, Salvador del Solar, set forth a vote of confidence before the Congress for refusing to pass a bill that modified the election process of judges of the Constitutional Court. The vote of confidence sought to stop the election of magistrates, modify the Organic Law of the Constitutional Court. However, the Plenary Session of Congress decided to continue with the election of magistrates, and ignored the vote of confidence presented by Del Solar, naming a new member to the Constitutional Court. Many of the Constitutional Court nominees selected by Congress were alleged to be involved in corruption.

Notwithstanding the affirmative vote, Vizcarra stated that the appointment of a new member of the Constitutional Court and an ignoring of the confidence motion constituted a de facto vote of no confidence in the government, which would be the second of the legislative term. These actions by Congress, as well as the months of slow progress towards anti-corruption reforms, pushed Vizcarra to dissolve the legislative body on 30 September, with Vizcarra stating "Peruvian people, we have done all we could." By the night of 30 September, Peruvians gathered outside of the Legislative Palace to protest against Congress and demand the removal of legislators while the heads of the Armed Forces met with Vizcarra, announcing that they still recognized him as president and head of the armed forces.

== Process before the Constitutional Court ==
Pedro Olaechea, who was President of Congress prior to its dissolution and subsequently became President of the Permanent Assembly, filed a claim against the Vizcarra government over its power to dissolve Congress on 10 October 2019. The Constitutional Court would grant admission to the claim on 29 October 2019. A public constitutional attorney representing the executive branch, Luis Alberto Huerta Guerrero, would review the claim on 22 November 2019 and reject its arguments.

== Judgement ==
In a decision on 9 January 2020, the Constitutional Court would state:

For these reasons, the Constitutional Court, with the authority conferred by the Political Constitution of Peru, IT HAS BEEN RESOLVED to declare UNFOUNDED the jurisdictional claim filed by the President of the Permanent Commission.

| Decision | Judge | Total votes |
|---|---|---|
| Against | Marianella Ledesma Narváez (President of the TC), Manuel Miranda Canales, Carlos Ramos Núñez and Eloy Espinosa-Saldaña | 4 |
| In favor | Ernesto Blume, Augusto Ferrero Costa and José Luis Sardón | 3 |

Regarding the "factual refusal" of the motion of confidence invoked by the executive branch, the ruling stated:

211. [...] In this regard, this Court notes that, although it is true that, in the greatest number of scenarios, the verification of the granting or denial of the question of confidence can be noticed with the act of voting in the Congress of the Republic, it is also important to consider that there are extraordinary cases in which it is evident that, due to its actions, the legislative body has decided to reject the confidence raised.

In his decision, Judge Ramos Núñez stated that the executive branch was competent enough to raise a question of confidence for the topics of both the Constitutional Court's organic law and delaying the election of new court membership. In its decision, the court stated "when this Court, in Judgment 0006-2018-PI/TC, declared the unconstitutionality of article 86.e) of the Rules of Procedure of the Congress, which regulated the cases in which the question of trust could not be presented, it did so precisely considering the principle of balance of powers and that of parliamentary self-normativity". By citing Judgment 0006-2018-PI/TC, the court agreed that any attempt by Congress to prevent questions presented by the executive branch regarding a law or political procedure was unconstitutional.

In summary, the court determined, according to OjoPúblico, that it held no position to define when a question of confidence by the executive branch was invalid.

== Aftermath ==
According to Pedro Grández, a professor of constitutional law, the ruling established that the motion of no confidence in the constitution can be broadly interpreted and cannot be limited.

Some politicians continued to allege that the actions of President Vizcarra were illegal. Alejandro Muñante, congressman of the Popular Renewal party, said in a congressional discussion that the Constitutional Court ruled Vizcarra's dissolution as unconstitutional, though fact-checking group Ama Llulla reported that Muñante's accusation was false, citing the January 2020 ruling.
