= Judgment of the Constitutional Court of Peru over the motion of confidence proposed on 17 November 2022 =

Legal decision in Peru

Case over the vote of confidence and its rejection EXP N° 00004-2022-PCC/TC
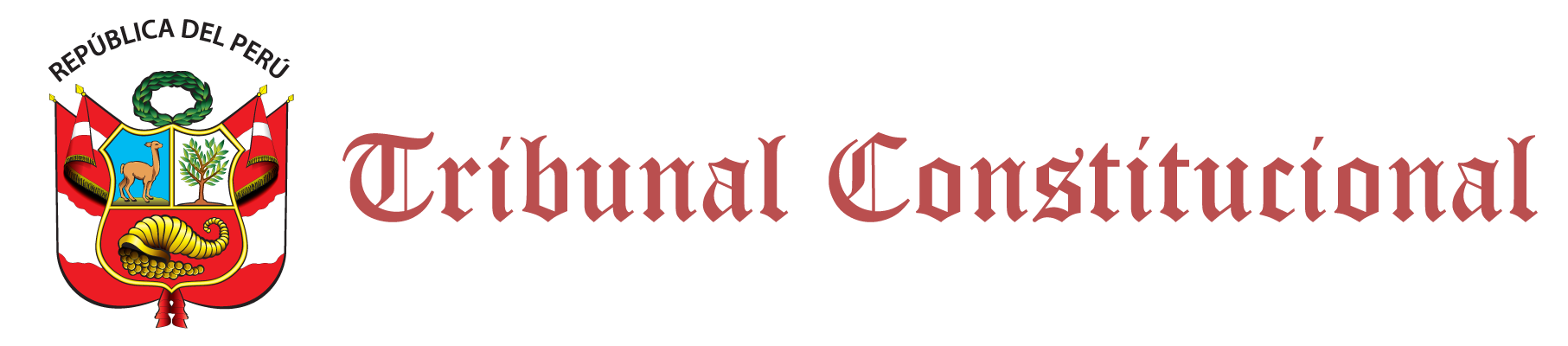
- Court: Constitutional Court of Peru
- Decided: 30 May 2023
- Citation: Constitution of Peru
- Transcript: 00004-2022-PCC/TC

Court membership
- Judges sitting: Francisco Morales Saravia (President), Luis Gustavo Gutiérrez Ticse, Helder Dominguez Haro, Luz Imelda Pacheco Zerga, César Ochoa Cardich, Manuel Monteagudo Valdez.

Case opinions
- Decision by: Majority
- Concurrence: 5
- Concur/dissent: 1
- Dissent: 0

Keywords
- Motion of confidence

The Judgment of the Constitutional Court of Peru over the motion of confidence proposed on 17 November 2022 is a legal decision of the Constitutional Court of Peru adopted by majority on 30 May 2023, in response to the jurisdictional claim filed by the Congress of Peru against the administration of then-President Pedro Castillo for the motion of confidence raised on 17 November 2022 by its Prime Minister Aníbal Torres to obtain from Congress the approval of Bill 3570/2022-PE that proposed repealing the Law No. 31399, and whose "rejection" had been interpreted by the executive power as a denial of the same, according to the agreement adopted in the meeting of the council of ministers on 24 November 2022.

On 30 May 2023, the Constitutional Court agreed with Congress' claim against Castillo, and consequently declared null and void the Agreement of the Council of Ministers dated 24 November 2022, insofar as it illegally interpreted that the flat rejection of the motion of confidence supposed the denial or refusal of the same. By the contrary, the Court established that in no case is the executive power empowered to make an interpretation contrary to that made on the subject by the Congress, nor is it empowered to assume that there has been a factual denial or refusal of the same, which is contrary to the Constitution, since the denial must always be express and decided by Congress. The judgement overruled a 2019 Constitutional Court decision which had introduced the concept of "factual denial of confidence", which gave the executive branch a broad power of interpretation to decide when a motion of confidence has been rejected or not by the Congress.

After the verdict was made public, reception of the judgement was mixed; some legal experts considered that the judgment was correct by restoring the balance of power between the executive and legislative branch, and that even the former president of the Council of Ministers Aníbal Torres and the ministers who signed the Certificate of the Session of the Council of Ministers on 24 November 2022, could be denounced as it has been established that said act was unconstitutional. On the other hand, some criticized the ruling, considering rather that it upsets the aforementioned balance of power between the executive and legislative branch.

== Background ==
=== The "vote of confidence" in the Peruvian legal system ===
The vote of confidence (or motion of confidence) in Peru is a constitutional instrument that the executive branch has, through which the President of the Council of Ministers, on behalf of the cabinet as a whole, or the ministers individually, request the express endorsement of the Congress to the formation of a new cabinet or a policy or management initiative.

The Constitutional Court of Peru, in a 2018 ruling, categorized the vote of confidence into two types: one mandatory and one optional. The first is what is commonly called the investiture vote (every time a new cabinet is appointed) and the second is the one requested by the executive branch in support of certain government measures or actions. In the event of a denial of confidence, the total crisis of the cabinet occurs and the ministers are forced to resign.

The use of this mechanism is of fundamental importance, given that Article 134 of the Constitution of Peru establishes that if Congress denies confidence to two cabinets, the President is empowered to dissolve it and call new parliamentary elections:

Article 134 The President of the Republic has the power to dissolve Congress if it has censured or denied its confidence to two Cabinets.
The dissolution decree shall contain a call for the election of a new Congress. Such elections shall be held within four months of the dissolution of Congress, without any alteration of the existing electoral system. Congress may not be dissolved during the last year of its term. Once Congress is dissolved, the Permanent Assembly, which may not be dissolved, continues exercising its functions
There is no other form to revoke the parliamentary mandate.
Under a state of siege, Congress may not be dissolved.

— Constitution of Peru

=== 2019 dissolution of Congress ===
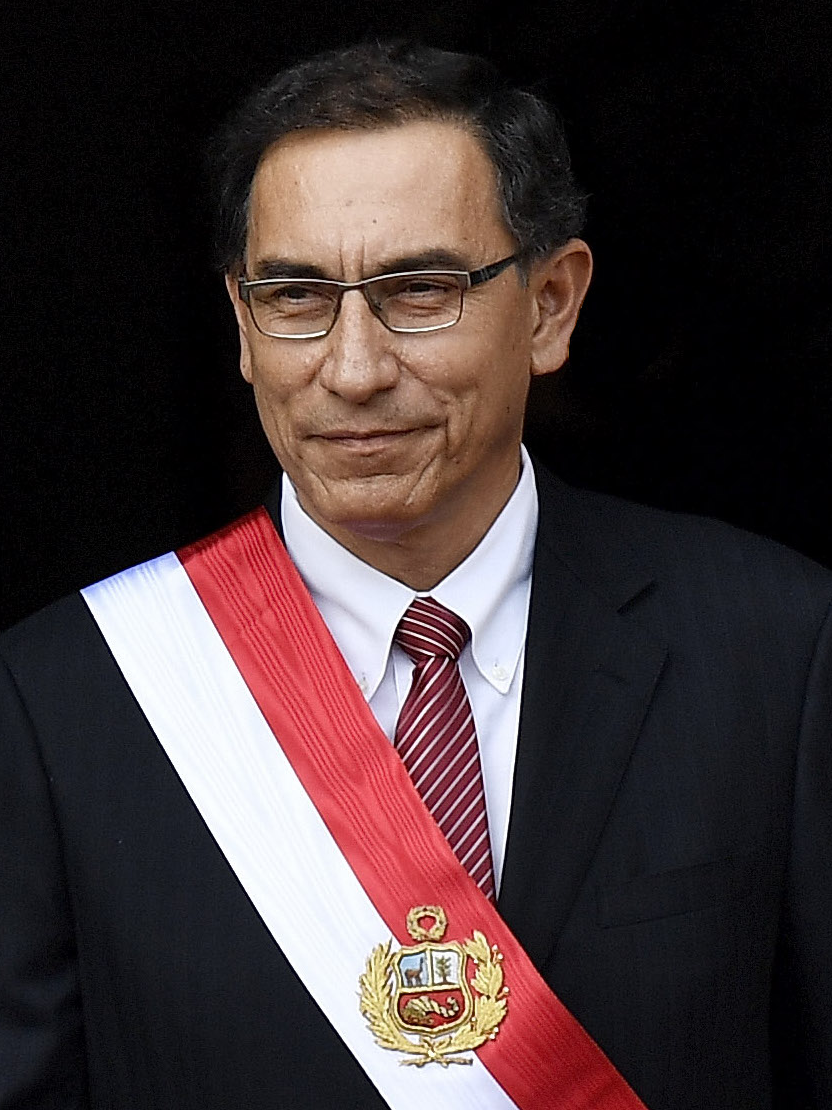
President Martín Vizcarra, whose dissolution of Congress was found legal by a previous Constitutional Court

On 30 September 2019, the then prime minister Salvador del Solar went to the Legislative Palace and raised a motion fo confidence to request the approval of law to reform the Constitutional Court nomination process. However, the Congress decided to postpone the vote of the amendment and appointed a new member to the Constitutional Court of Peru. Hours later, the Congress granted the motion of confidence.

Notwithstanding the affirmative vote, Vizcarra stated that the appointment of a new member of the Constitutional Court constituted a de facto denial of confidence. He said that it was the second act of no-confidence in his government (since Congress had already passed a denial of confidence against the prime minister and the cabinet on 15 September 2017), granting him the authority to dissolve Congress and call for new legislative elections.

On 14 January 2020, the Constitutional Court ruled that the dissolution of Congress by Vizcarra under the given rationale was legal. In its ruling, the Constitutional Court cited Judgment 0006-2018-PI/TC, agreeing that any attempt by Congress to prevent questions presented by the executive branch regarding a law or political procedure was unconstitutional.

Regarding the "factual denial of confidence" invoked by the executive branch, the ruling stated:

211. [...] In this regard, this Court notes that, although it is true that, in the greatest number of scenarios, the verification of the granting or denial of the motion of confidence can be noticed with the act of voting in the Congress of the Republic, it is also important to consider that there are extraordinary cases in which it is evident that, due to its actions, the legislative body has decided to deny the confidence raised.

=== Approval of Law No. 31399 ===
On 30 January 2022, Congress approved Law No. 31399 that modified articles 40 and 44 of Law No. 26300 that regulates the Rights of Citizen Participation and Control, adding a precision according to which they cannot be submitted to referendum the norms that are not processed according to the procedure established in article 206 of the Political Constitution of Peru:

"Article 40.- Inadmissibility of referendum The matters and norms referred to in the second paragraph of article 32 of the Constitution cannot be submitted to a referendum, nor those that are not processed according to the procedure established in the first paragraph of article 206 of the Political Constitution.

— Law N° 31399

Article 206 of the Political Constitution of Peru establishes that any constitutional reform must be approved by Congress with an absolute majority of the legal number of its members, and ratified by referendum, and that the referendum may be omitted when the agreement of Congress is obtained in two successive ordinary legislatures with a favorable vote, in each case, greater than two-thirds of the legal number of congressmen. Consequently, the Law N° 31399 ratified that to validly call a referendum with the purpose of modifying or reforming the Constitution, it was necessary that said modification or reform be first approved by the Congress.

=== Vote of confidence proposition ===
On 17 November 2022, the government of President Pedro Castillo, through his Prime Minister Aníbal Torres, requested a vote of confidence over the proposition of approving the Bill of Law 3570/2022-PE intended to repeal the Law N° 31399, which in his opinion limited the rights of participation and control of the citizenry, through referendum, in constitutional reforms. Torres said that the government project "restores the political participation of the people" by eliminating the limits to the referendum established by Law N° 31399 and, for this reason, requested a "vote of confidence on behalf of the Council of Ministers". On 24 November 2022, the Congressionally-appointed Constitutional Court of Peru declared unfounded a lawsuit by the executive branch that questioned the constitutionality of this law, establishing that the norm was fully valid and in accordance with the Constitution.

=== Congress rejects the request for a vote of confidence ===
On 24 November 2022, Congress rejected the request for a vote of confidence raised by the President of the Council of Ministers, indicating that Bill 3570 to repeal Law N° 31399 refers to two exclusive powers of the Legislative Branch on which the Executive Power cannot make a motion of confidence, so the government's intention collides with article 206 of the Constitution of Peru. The President of Congress pointed out in this regard that the request for a vote of confidence raised does not refer to a general government policy, therefore it violates the powers of the Congress, threatens the principle of separation of powers and conditions the decision of the Legislative Branch, and that any attempt by the President of the Council of Ministers to interpret the meaning of the decision of the Legislative Branch exceeds the constitutional and legal framework, because it affects the separation of powers. The operative part of Agreement No. 061-2022-2023/MESA-CR of the Congress indicates:

AGREE
FIRST.- Reject outright the request for a vote of confidence raised by the President of the Council of Ministers on behalf of the Council, as these are prohibited matters for raising a vote of confidence, as established by the Constitutional Court in legal ground 185 of the judgment relapsed in file 006-2019-CC and Law 31355, Law that develops the exercise of the vote of confidence regulated in the last paragraph of article 132 and in article 133 of the Constitution of Peru

=== The executive branch interprets that the confidence has been denied ===
The executive branch, by means of an agreement adopted in a meeting of the Council of Ministers held on 24 November 2022, interpreted that the confidence had been denied:

We maintain, then, categorically, that the rejection, refusal, or denial of the confidence, is configured with any of these mechanisms: inadmissibility, flat rejection, denial of the confidence, to avoid abuse of rights or fraud of the Constitution.
In this case, "outright rejection of the request for a vote of confidence" clearly constitutes a denial of the confidence. Therefore, the consequence is the total crisis of the cabinet.

— Minutes of the Session of the Council of Ministers of 24 November 2022

== Ruling process ==
=== Presentation of the lawsuit and request for precautionary measure ===
On 29 November 2022, the Congress filed a jurisdictional claim before the Constitutional Court regarding how to interpret its decision to reject the request for a vote of confidence raised by the Executive. In the petition for his claim, Congress requested the Constitutional Court the following:

1. That it be declared that the Executive Power lacks the competence to interpret and conclude, of its own accord, that the Congress of the Republic has denied it or not the vote of confidence that it saw fit to raise in the plenary session of Congress on 17 November 2022.
2. Consequently, that be annulled the motion of confidence raised by the President of the Council of Ministers in the plenary session of Congress held on 17 November 2022, for the approval of Bill 3570/2022-PE, presented through Official Letter No. 359-2022-PR, in such a way that the Constitutional Court, when resolving the conflict of powers for impairment of powers in the strict sense, guarantees the exercise of the powers that the Constitution, the Regulations of the Congress and the Law Nº 31355 (both organic laws) grant it to the Congress, preventing the vote of confidence from being used arbitrarily or improperly by the Executive Power, as a threat or sanction mechanism to unconstitutionally dissolve Congress and declare a parliamentary term ended early.
3. That the agreement adopted at the Council of Ministers session held on 24 November 2022 be declared null and void, regarding the interpretation of the meaning of the Agreement of the Board of Directors (Agreement No. 061-2022-2023/MESA- CR) that flatly rejected the question of confidence and regarding the decision on the question of confidence raised by the Executive Power.

Together with the lawsuit, Congress submitted a request for a precautionary measure so that the Executive Power refrains from considering as denied the vote of confidence that the then President of the Council of Ministers filed in the plenary session of Congress on 17 November 2022; and, consequently, that in the event that Congress does not grant confidence to future Councils of Ministers, it should not proceed to dissolve the Congress of the Republic until the Constitutional Court, as the supreme interpreter of the Constitution, has handed down a firm and definitive sentence in the present jurisdictional process.

=== Decision of the Court on the admissibility of the application and precautionary measure ===
On 1 December 2022, the plenary session of the Constitutional Court voted unanimously to admit for processing the jurisdictional claim filed by Congress against the executive branch, as well as to grant the requested precautionary measure. In the Order by which the Court grants the precautionary measure, it states the following:

RESOLVE

1. GRANT the requested precautionary measure.

2. SUSPEND any effect that could derive from the decision of the Executive Power to interpret as denied the confidence referred to in the Minutes of the meeting of the Council of Ministers corresponding to 24 November 2022, without taking it into account for the purposes of the first paragraph of article 134 of the Constitution. Consequently, ORDER that the Executive Power does not alter or modify the factual or legal situation of the Congress of the Republic, in relation to what is specified in foundations 29 and 30 of this resolution.

— Order of Constitutional Court of Peru granting precautionary measure

=== Pedro Castillo tries to dissolve the congress ===
On December 7, 2022, President Pedro Castillo addressed the country on televised national chain, in which he announced his decision to dissolve Congress, intervene in autonomous institutions such as the Judiciary, the Public Ministry, the National Board of Justice and the Constitutional Court, in addition to calling for the election of a Constituent Assembly. Castillo argued that Congress served oligopolic businesses and that it had allied itself with the Constitutional Court to destroy the executive branch in an effort to create a "dictatorship of Congress". The coup attempt failed as it lacked general support and Castillo was arrested near the Mexican embassy.

== Judgment ==
=== Court's ruling decision ===
On 30 May 2023, the judgment of the Court was made public by means of which it declared the lawsuit founded, agreeing with Congress, and consequently declared null and void the Agreement of the Council of Ministers dated 24 November 2022, insofar as it illegally interpreted that the flat rejection of the motion of confidence supposed the denial or refusal of the same. By the contrary, the court established that in no case is the executive power empowered to make an interpretation contrary to that made on the subject by the Congress of the Republic, nor is it empowered to assume that there has been a factual refusal of the same, which is contrary to the Constitution, since the refusal must always be express and decided by parliament.

RESOLVE
Declare FOUNDED the jurisdictional claim raised by the Congress of the Republic against the Executive Power; consequently, ANNUL the Agreement of the Council of Ministers dated 24 November 2022, insofar as it establishes that the flat rejection implies the refusal or denial of the question of confidence.

— Judgment of Constitutional Court of Peru EXP. N.° 00004-2022-PCC/TC

The sense in which each magistrate voted was as follows:

Decision	Judge	Total votos
Claim granted	Francisco Morales Saravia (Chief judge), Luis Gustavo Gutiérrez Ticse, Helder Dominguez Haro, Luz Imelda Pacheco Zerga y César Ochoa Cardich	5
Claim partially granted	Manuel Monteagudo Valdez	1
Claim not granted		0

== Implications ==
The final ruling and, before it, the court's decision to grant the precautionary measure on 1 December 2022, showed that the attempted coup d'état of Pedro Castillo on 7 December 2022 was illegal, since the motion of confidence proposed on 17 November 2022 was not considered as denied and therefore the former president was not empowered to dissolve the Congress according to Article 134 of Peruvian Constitution. Also, the Court's decision overruled the Judgment over the dissolution of Congress on 2019, leaving without effect the concept of "factual denial of confidence" that it had established.

Reception of the ruling was mixed. The former presidents of the Constitutional Court Óscar Urviola and Ernesto Álvarez Miranda assured that the ruling was correct. Urviola asserted that "this situation that was disturbing relations between the Executive and the Legislative is closed", while Álvarez considered that the ruling "has put things in their place". For his part, the legal expert Domingo García Belaúnde specified in this regard that it is "a good ruling in general terms, because errors are being corrected. The correct criterion is this, because the vote of confidence cannot be interpreted by the Executive". Likewise, university professor in constitutional law Carlos Hakansson considered it correct that the 2019 Constitutional Court decision had been overruled, pointing out that it "puts an end to the controversial decision of the then Collegiate that, by majority, validated the unconstitutional dissolution of Congress on September 30, 2019". Former president of the Constitutional Court Marianella Ledesma, whose 2019 decision was overruled, responded negatively by saying "this TC once again concentrate in the hands of Congress a power that denatures the essence of the constitutional State: the balance of powers. These magistrates show that they are the voice of those who have put them in their positions". According to Pedro Grández, a professor of constitutional law, the previous 2019 ruling had already established that the denial of confidence in the constitution can be broadly interpreted and cannot be limited, stating the Constitutional Court "has broken the balance of powers by delivering the issue of trust to Congress". Iván Lanegra, the Secretary General of the Peruvian NGO Transparencia, criticized the ruling, stating that it made Peru's political system appear "anomalous" and "formed more by responses of the powers of the day to short-term situations", concluding that it would be "the seed of a new conflict".

The constitutional expert Aníbal Quiroga considered that the former president of the Council of Ministers Aníbal Torres and the ministers who signed the Minutes of the Session of the Council of Ministers on 24 November 2022, could be denounced, having established the Court that said act was unconstitutional. It was also suggested that former president Martín Vizcarra would face legal issues following the ruling due to his 2019 dissolution of Congress, despite his actions being ruled constitutional by the previous Constitutional Court.

== See also ==
- Judgment of the Constitutional Court of Peru over the dissolution of Congress on 30 September 2019
