= 2019–2020 Peruvian constitutional crisis =

Political crisis in Peru

- Part of the Peruvian political crisis (2016–present)
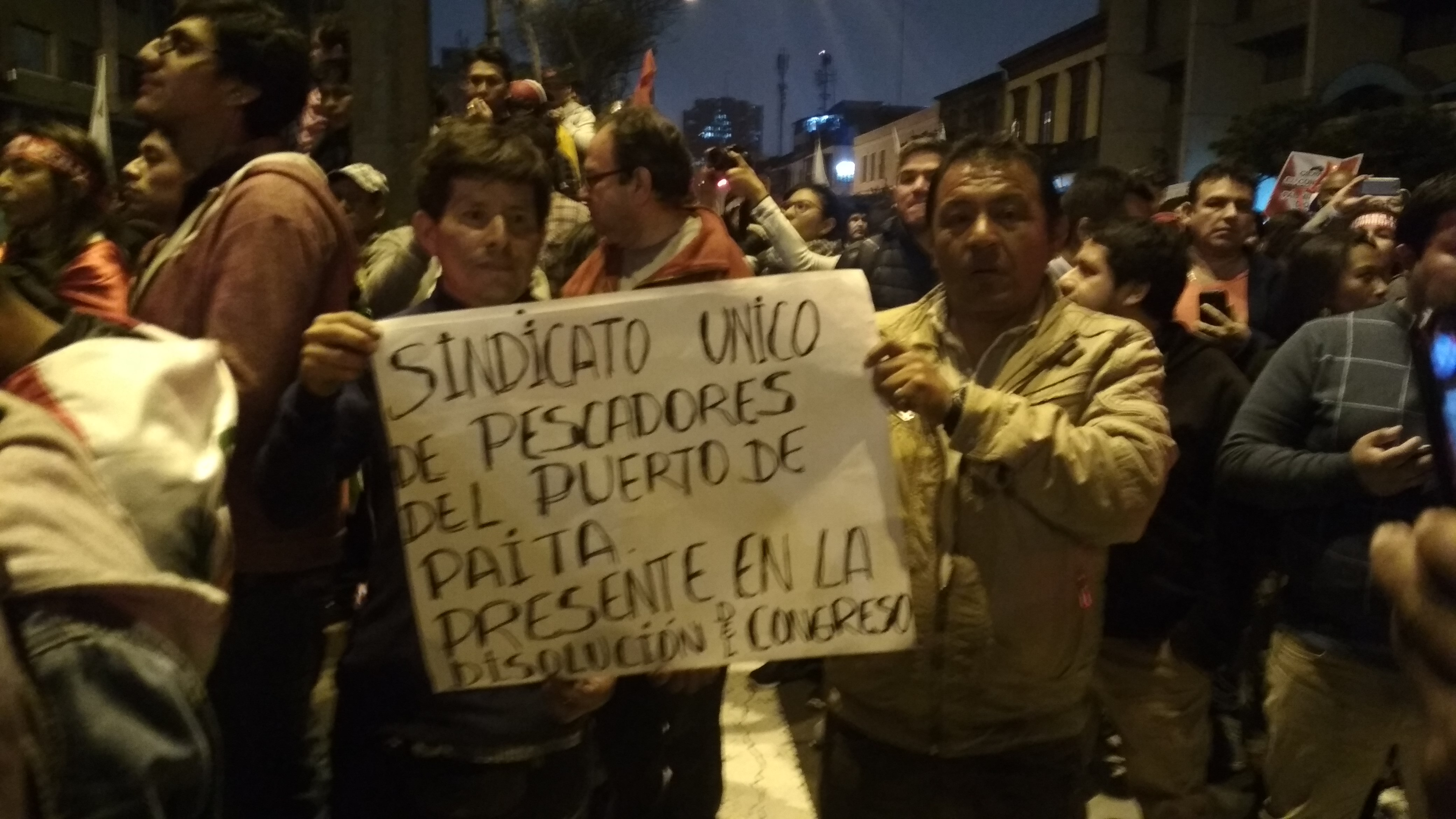
- A demonstration in favor of the dissolution of Congress
- Date: 30 September 2019 – 14 January 2020 (3 months and 15 days)
- Location: Peru
- Goals: Anti-corruption reforms
- Methods: Dissolution of Congress; Congressional snap elections to be held in January 2020
- Result: Constitutional Court rules that dissolution was legal and constitutional.

Parties
President of Peru; Council of Ministers; Armed Forces of Peru	Congress of Peru: Popular Force (majority)

Lead figures
Martín Vizcarra; Mercedes Aráoz; Salvador del Solar	Pedro Olaechea; Keiko Fujimori

The 2019–2020 Peruvian constitutional crisis occurred between September 30, 2019, and January 14, 2020, during the presidency of Martín Vizcarra. The crisis began when President Vizcarra dissolved the Congress of Peru, citing a constitutional provision after its de facto rejection of a vote of confidence. This disbanding marked the first time such power was used by the executive, and immediately after its announcement, opposition lawmakers accused Vizcarra of staging a coup. Subsequently, Peru’s Constitutional Court declared the dissolution of Congress legal, ending the crisis.

The crisis stemmed from tensions since 2016 between the executive and the legislature, with clashes over the anti-corruption reforms proposed by Vizcarra’s government. Efforts to reform the selection process for the Constitutional Court and combat corruption were blocked by Congress, particularly by the Popular Force party led by Keiko Fujimori. In response, Congress briefly declared the suspension of Vizcarra’s presidency and the appointment of Mercedes Aráoz as interim president, a move that quickly collapsed when Aráoz resigned the next day.

Public reaction was generally favorable, as the move resonated with widespread dissatisfaction toward a Congress viewed as obstructive and corrupt. Vizcarra signed a decree that called for early legislative elections to be held on January 26, 2020.

== Background ==
=== Obstructionism by Congress ===
Since 2016, relations between the Peruvian presidency and Congress have been marked by conflict. This tension surfaced early in the tenure of President Pedro Pablo Kuczynski, who faced opposition from Congress, culminating on September 14, 2017, when Congress overwhelmingly passed a motion of no confidence against Prime Minister Fernando Zavala. This led to a complete cabinet reshuffle and the appointment of a new prime minister.

In March 2018, Kuczynski resigned amid the “Kenjivideos” scandal, which revealed alleged attempts to buy votes from legislators to avoid impeachment. Following his resignation, First Vice President Martín Vizcarra assumed the presidency. Committed to anti-corruption measures, Vizcarra prioritized constitutional reforms aimed at increasing government transparency and reducing corruption. These reforms included prohibiting private funding for political campaigns, banning the re-election of legislators, and introducing a second legislative chamber. Transparency International endorsed Vizcarra’s proposals, stating that they presented a unique opportunity for genuine reform.

However, Vizcarra’s initiatives faced resistance from the Popular Force party, led by Keiko Fujimori. Fujimori herself was arrested in October 2018 on charges of money laundering and corruption in connection with the Odebrecht scandal, a high-profile case involving bribery across Latin America. The Popular Force party, which held a majority in Congress, opposed Vizcarra’s reforms and introduced a bill to modify his proposed referendum. In December 2018, the referendum proceeded, with the Peruvian public largely supporting Vizcarra's original proposals over those modified by Congress.

=== No-confidence law ===
The Peruvian Constitution grants the executive branch the authority to dissolve Congress following a second vote of no-confidence. The first vote of no-confidence took place on September 14, 2017. Subsequently, on September 27, 2019, President Martín Vizcarra called for a matter of confidence, stating that "the democracy of our nation is at risk" due to Congress's actions.

Vizcarra’s call for confidence was rooted in disputes over reforms to the Constitutional Court’s organic law. Vizcarra and the Inter-American Commission on Human Rights criticized Congress for blocking proposals to hold general elections while swiftly approving nominees to the Constitutional Court of Peru without conducting background checks.

== Events ==
=== Allegation of corruption in the Constitutional Court ===
On September 27, 2019, an interview was published in the weekly Hildebrandt en sus trece, in which journalist César Hildebrandt spoke with Constitutional Court magistrate Marianella Ledesma Narváez. Ledesma revealed that a colleague had suggested she could retain her position on the Court if she voted in favor of releasing Keiko Fujimori, a politician facing corruption charges. The Court was then considering a habeas corpus petition filed by Fujimori’s sister, Sachi Fujimori, to secure her release.

=== Matter of confidence on the Constitutional Court ===
Hours later on that day, and following Congress’s rejection of a proposal to advance general elections, the Vizcarra administration announced a motion of confidence related to the process for selecting Constitutional Court magistrates. President Martín Vizcarra stated that Prime Minister Salvador del Solar would formally present the motion of confidence, requesting that Congress approve amendments to the Organic Law of the Constitutional Court to reform magistrate selection procedures.

The matter of confidence called on Congress to halt the current selection process, approve the proposed procedural changes, and apply them to the ongoing selection of magistrates. On September 27, the Prime Minister’s Office (PCM) officially notified Congress of Del Solar’s intention to present the matter for legislative consideration.

In an interview on September 29, Vizcarra asserted that if Congress denied the confidence motion, he would exercise his constitutional authority to dissolve Congress and call for new elections. On September 30, Prime Minister Del Solar and his cabinet convened at the Government Palace before proceeding to Congress to present the confidence matter and the proposed legal reforms. Upon arrival, Del Solar requested to deliver the bill immediately but was informed he would need to wait until 9:00 a.m. PET, the official opening time for document submissions. The matter of confidence was officially registered at 9:09 a.m., marked as bill number 4847/2019-PE, and forwarded to the Committee of Constitution and Regulations.

Meanwhile, the Board of Spokespersons—a body comprising congressional leaders tasked with prioritizing plenary discussions—convened to set the day’s agenda. At approximately 10:25 a.m., the board resolved to hold a vote on the Constitutional Court magistrates that morning, reserving the afternoon for Del Solar’s presentation. This schedule allowed Congress to proceed with the magistrate elections before addressing the matter of confidence, with Popular Force, APRA, Contigo, Acción Republicana, Cambio 21, and Alliance for Progress supporting this sequence.

==== Matter of confidence in Congress proceedings ====
On September 30, 2019, a plenary session of the Peruvian Congress commenced at 10:25 a.m. with 102 of the 130 members present, surpassing the quorum requirement of 62. According to official records, the session opened amid noticeable commotion as the Congress president initiated the scheduled election of new Constitutional Court magistrates. Tensions arose when some lawmakers objected to proceeding with the election before addressing the matter of confidence that Prime Minister Salvador del Solar was set to present that afternoon.

At approximately 10:40 a.m., members of the New Peru and Broad Front parties submitted a motion of censure against the Board of Presiding Officers (Mesa Directiva). The motion alleged that the Board had misused its authority by prioritizing the magistrate elections over the confidence issue. Concurrently, Prime Minister Del Solar, accompanied by his cabinet and having waited in Congress since 8:00 a.m., attempted to enter the chamber to present the confidence motion. However, he faced resistance at the chamber doors from members of the majority party, who had locked the entrance. Congresswoman Marisa Glave of New Peru protested the restricted access, noting that members were required to knock on the doors to exit. Gloria Montenegro, Minister of Women, also criticized the decision to seal the doors, stating that she had to assert her status as a congresswoman to gain entry.

Around 10:50 a.m., with Speaker Pedro Olaechea briefly absent from the session floor, acting Speaker César Vásquez authorized the doors to be reopened. Vásquez announced at 10:52 a.m. that Del Solar and his ministers had entered without official authorization, leading to a suspension of the session. Following a brief standoff between majority and minority congressmen around the ministerial cabinet, Del Solar remained inside despite demands to leave.

The session resumed at 11:18 a.m. Broad Front Congressman Hernando Cevallos Flores supported the censure motion, urging Congress to address the confidence motion as it reflected the "will of the country". Acting Speaker Vásquez denied Cevallos’s request to grant Del Solar the floor. Cevallos concluded by challenging the current direction of Congress and urged President Vizcarra to "close this Congress."

Congressman Gilbert Violeta of the Contigo party criticized the motion of censure, accusing its supporters of seeking the “political and economic destruction of Peru.” He argued that the executive branch was infringing upon legislative autonomy and dared President Vizcarra to dissolve Congress if he intended to do so. APRA Congressman Mauricio Mulder echoed these criticisms, claiming that the government sought to extend control over the Constitutional Court and other judicial bodies by blocking new appointments, and argued that the legislature should act swiftly to fill these roles.

Ultimately, Congress voted on the censure motion, with 83 members opposing it, 29 supporting it, and 2 abstaining.

==== Matter of confidence and debate on Constitutional Court appointments ====
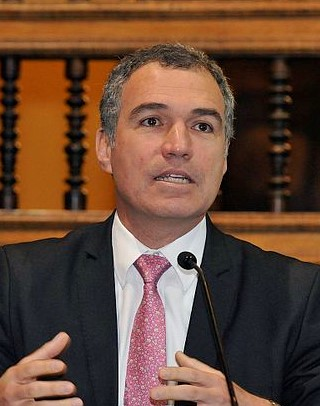
PM Salvador del Solar made a question of confidence to the Congress, regarding the election of magistrates of the Constitutional Court.

At 11:36 a.m, Congressman Pedro Olaechea resumed presiding over the Peruvian Congress during a session marked by tension over the appointment of Constitutional Court judges. Session minutes document that Congressman Gino Costa of the Liberal Party requested to yield his speaking time to Prime Minister Salvador del Solar. It appears that a prior conversation involving Olaechea, Del Solar, and Costa had established an agreement allowing Del Solar to address Congress for ten minutes, using Costa’s allotted time.

Following some objection and off-microphone exchanges, Olaechea clarified that Del Solar’s address was a courtesy rather than a procedural obligation, stating, "You have ten minutes, Prime Minister, and then you have to leave."

Upon receiving permission, Del Solar addressed Congress, beginning with appreciation for the opportunity yet asserting his constitutional right to speak. Citing Article 129 of the Constitution, he explained, “I am here, on the occasion in which this Congress wants to take the very important decision of electing magistrates for the Constitutional Court, the highest interpretative entity of the [Constitution] and the entity that defends the fundamental rights of the people.”

He further remarked that the selection of judges for the Constitutional Court must be transparent, stating that “it is important for a country that its magistrates be elected through a transparent procedure.” Del Solar further stressed that the exclusive use of the “by-invitation” selection modality since 2014 is highly questionable. This is because it was intended to be an exceptional modality, but it has replaced the ordinary, more transparent process, which included public hearings and the participation of civil society actors. "We are not allowing the citizenry to know who will accede to the highest magistracy of constitutional interpretation," he said, asserting that everyone is entitled to know whether the candidates are competent.

As part of his argument, Del Solar highlighted specific examples of the Court's influence on critical societal issues, explaining, “The Constitutional Court has not only resolved cases such as...the meritocracy criterion for teachers, affecting both educators and students’ rights; it has also deliberated on the rights of Quechua-speaking citizens to receive public services in their own language.”

Del Solar warned that proceeding with an opaque appointment process would exacerbate Peru’s ongoing “crisis of legitimacy,” an issue he had previously raised. He remarked, “When I came to this Congress to ask for the investiture...I said what I repeat below: ‘The political crisis we are going through has become a crisis of legitimacy that has deeply wounded the confidence of the citizens in all of us.’” Urging Congress to avoid further haste, he questioned, “Why the rush? Why should the country see us as in a hurry?”

In closing, Del Solar formally presented a motion of confidence on behalf of the executive branch, contingent upon Congress implementing a transparent procedure for the Court appointments. He asked Congress to decide “whether to grant us confidence and consider...that we must make use of transparency, or to deny it to us if it considers that it is going to go ahead with that procedure.”

==== Congressional Proceedings on Judicial Appointments and Matter of Confidence ====
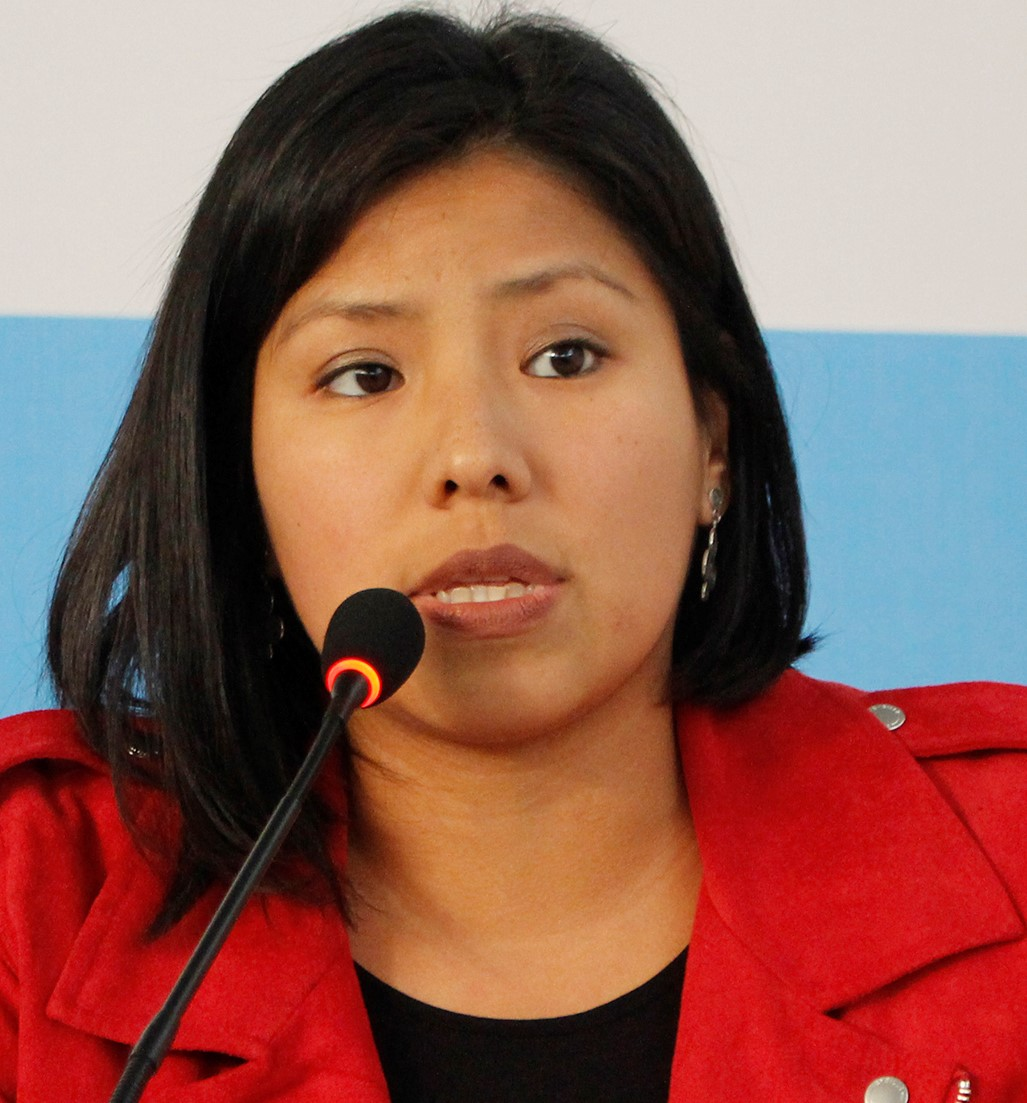
Congresswoman Indira Huilca presented a point of order, to first attend to the motion of confidentiality raised by the PM.

At a session of the Peruvian Congress, Congresswoman Indira Huilca of the New Peru party introduced a previous question requesting that Congress delay the vote on Constitutional Court magistrates until the matter of confidence, raised by the executive branch, could be addressed. This motion was rejected by a vote of 80 to 34, and Congress proceeded with the appointment process.

Congress succeeded in securing the qualified majority of 87 votes required to elect one nominee, Gonzalo Ortiz de Zevallos Olaechea, to the Constitutional Court. However, further appointments were stalled when it became evident that additional nominees lacked the necessary support. Notably, several of the nominees under consideration were reported by The New York Times to have alleged links to corruption.

In light of the stalled appointments, Congressional President Pedro Olaechea suspended the session after expediting the approval of the minutes for actions completed thus far. Congress agreed to reconvene at 4:00 p.m. to debate the matter of confidence raised by Prime Minister Salvador del Solar. Proceedings resumed at approximately 4:15 p.m., when Congress initiated debate on this executive proposal.

=== Dissolution of Congress ===
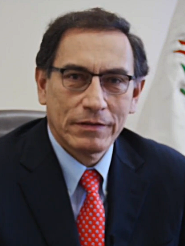
President Martin Vizcarra, in a televised speech, announced his decision to dissolve Congress and call new elections.

At 5:33 p.m., President Martín Vizcarra addressed the nation via a televised speech, outlining the day's activities in Congress. Vizcarra announced that Congress had effectively rejected his motion of confidence by electing a magistrate to the Constitutional Court. He interpreted this action as a de facto denial of confidence.

During the congressional session, legislators conducted a delayed vote on the confidence motion, resulting in 50 votes in favor, 31 against, and 13 abstentions at 5:41 p.m. One minute later, Vizcarra declared the dissolution of Congress, stating:

Today, we presented the third motion of confidence ... then, the first member of an expedited court was approved in a dubious vote, stripping the matter of confidence of all its content. In light of this factual denial of confidence, and with full respect for the Political Constitution of Peru, I have decided to constitutionally dissolve Congress and call for congressional elections, as provided by Article 134 of the Constitution.

In his address, Vizcarra emphasized that constitutional provisions authorized his decision to dissolve Congress. He expressed concern over prolonged resistance within the legislature. "The fight against corruption and institutional strengthening were the first two pillars" of the administration, he stated, and that Congress's consistent opposition to reforms was creating a political crisis. He noted that his government had invoked the confidence motion three times to advance necessary reforms aimed at preventing Congress from obstructing anti-corruption initiatives.

Additionally, he pointed out procedural irregularities of Congress, such as attempts to exclude the Prime Minister from debates and opposition to judicial reforms designed to bolster transparency in the selection of the Constitutional Court. Vizcarra said the opposition showed its unwillingness to put Peru first prompting him to act.

Vizcarra characterized the dissolution as a constitutional mechanism under Article 134 of the Peruvian Constitution, designed to facilitate new parliamentary elections. This process allows the populace to decide whether the existing Congress should be dissolved or reinstated. He stated that the dissolution would provide "a democratic and participatory solution to a problem that the country has been dragging for three years".

=== Congress declares interim president and resignation of Mercedes Aráoz ===
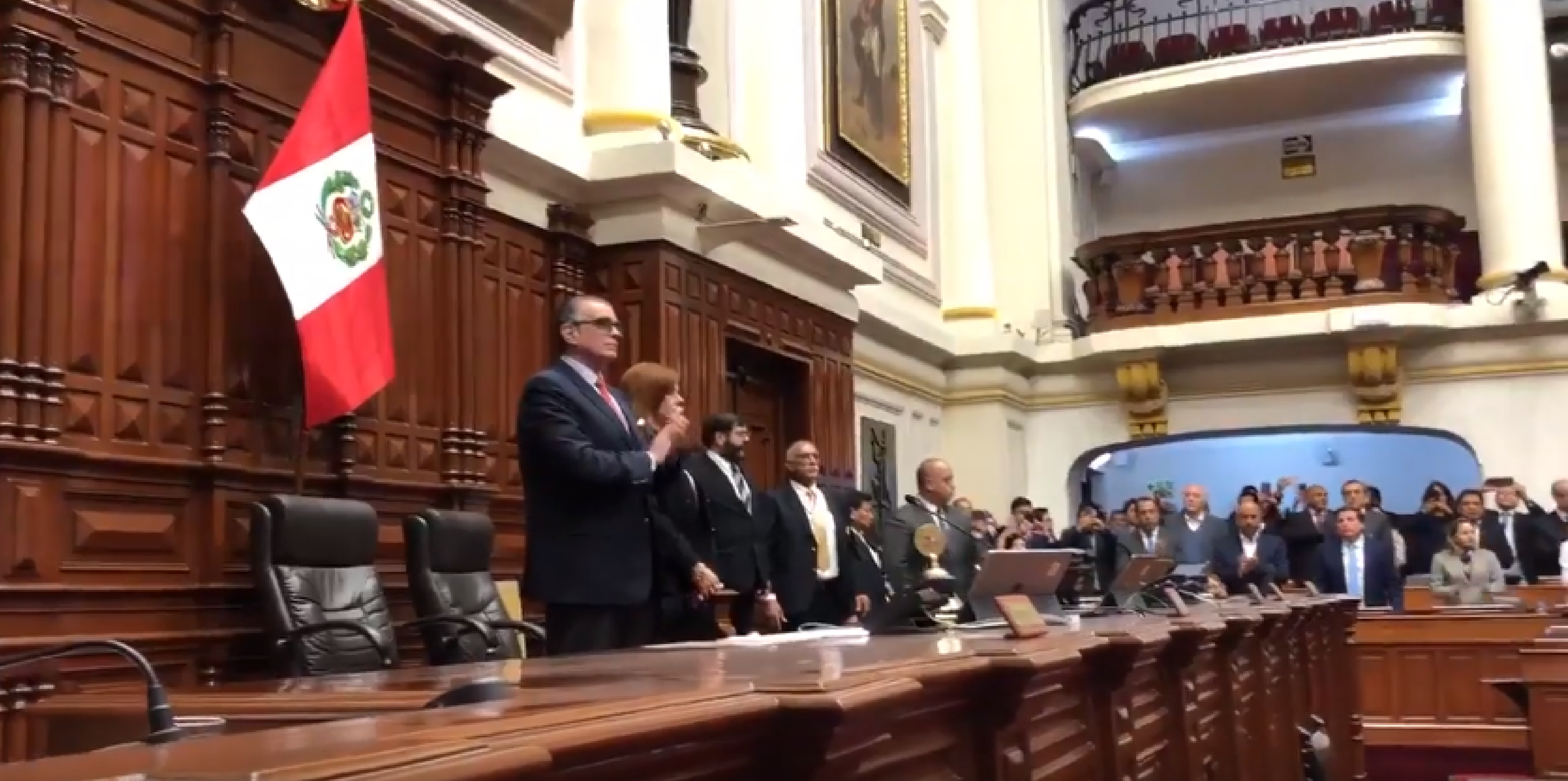
The inauguration of Mercedes Aráoz as president

Following President Vizcarra’s announcement of Congress’s dissolution, several political factions expressed varied responses. Members of the Liberal Party, New Peru, Broad Front, and Unidos por la República left the congressional chamber, demonstrating support for the measure. Meanwhile, members of the official Peruvians for Change party were present at the Government Palace, aligning with Vizcarra’s decision.

In contrast, the Fujimorist bloc, along with representatives from Apra, Contigo, Alianza para el Progreso, and Acción Popular, remained in the chamber, rejecting the dissolution. These groups attempted to declare the presidency vacant on grounds of “moral incapacity,” a measure requiring 87 of 130 legislative votes. When this threshold could not be met, they invoked Article 114 of the Constitution, opting instead to suspend Vizcarra for twelve months, citing “temporary incapacity.” Shortly after, they named Vice President Mercedes Aráoz as the interim president of Peru.

This decision was met with criticism from constitutional experts. Eloy Espinosa Saldaña, a magistrate of the Constitutional Court, noted that Article 114’s suspension mechanism had traditionally applied to cases of illness, casting doubt on its application to political disputes. Other legal scholars raised concerns regarding procedural fairness, asserting that Vizcarra’s right to due process and defense had not been adequately upheld in the suspension decision.

Peruvian government officials, however, deemed these actions invalid, asserting that Congress’s declarations were made after it had been officially dissolved. By the evening of September 30, crowds of Peruvians gathered outside the Legislative Palace, protesting Congress and calling for the removal of legislators. In support of Vizcarra, Peru’s Armed Forces shared a photograph from the Government Palace, affirming their recognition of him as the legitimate president and commander-in-chief.

On October 1, 2019, Aráoz resigned from the interim presidency, expressing her hope that her resignation would advance the general elections proposed by Vizcarra, which Congress had previously delayed. The President of Congress, Pedro Olaechea, reportedly reacted with surprise upon hearing of Aráoz’s resignation during an interview. No government institution or foreign nation recognized Aráoz as president during this period.

=== Constitutional Court rules in favor of Vizcarra ===
On October 10, 2019, Pedro Olaechea, serving as President of the Permanent Committee, filed a complaint with the Constitutional Court challenging President Vizcarra’s dissolution of Congress. On January 14, 2020, the Constitutional Court of Peru ruled that the dissolution of Congress on September 30, 2019, was constitutional and dismissed Olaechea’s claim. The court also determined that Congress’s actions to block the executive branch from raising matters of confidence were unconstitutional.

The Court noted that while a formal vote is typically required to confirm confidence, certain actions by Congress can implicitly indicate a denial. By proceeding with the selection of Constitutional Court magistrates despite repeated requests for suspension, Congress effectively rejected the confidence request. The Court concluded that Vizcarra’s decision to dissolve Congress was consistent with the Constitution, recognizing that Congress was fully aware of the terms of the confidence request but continued with the selection process.

=== Legislative elections decreed ===
President Vizcarra issued a decree setting January 26, 2020, as the date for legislative elections. The Organization of American States (OAS) issued a statement supporting Vizcarra’s call for elections, noting that the Constitutional Court could evaluate the legality of his actions. The OAS described the decree as a “constructive step,” emphasizing that the elections adhered to constitutional timelines and that the ultimate decision would rest with the Peruvian people.

== Reactions ==
=== Media ===
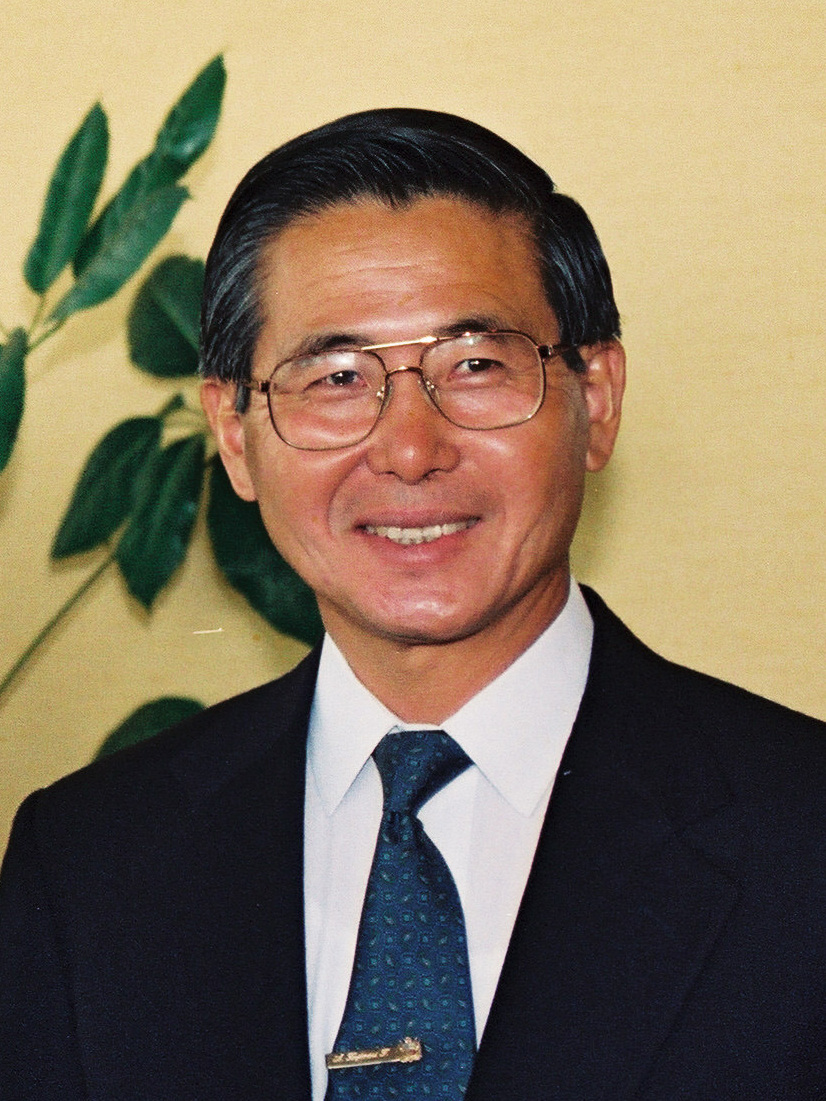
Then-president Alberto Fujimori dissolved the Congress and dismissed the Judiciary in the 1992 self-coup, helped by the military.

President Vizcarra’s action to dissolve Congress was widely compared to the self-coup of 1992, directed by then-President Alberto Fujimori. In an op-ed for The Wall Street Journal, journalist Mary O’Grady further claimed that actions of Vizcarra were a coup d'état and said the dismissal of Congress was illegal. On the other hand, The Economist said that Vizcarra’s action was not a coup because it did not involve the use of military force or the firing of judges, both of which were present during Fujimori’s actions. The report stated that if Congress were to dissolve, a 27-member "permanent committee" would still provide a check on presidential power. Meanwhile, Christine Armario, writing for the Associated Press, said the dissolution of Congress has created Peru’s deepest constitutional crisis in 30 years.

El País published an editorial asserting that President Vizcarra's dissolution of Congress was neither a coup nor unconstitutional but rather a "legal and perfectly legitimate solution". The editorial concluded that "Peruvian democracy has mechanisms that guarantee the continuity of the system of popular representation," emphasizing that President Vizcarra simply utilized these mechanisms.

Armario and The New York Times noticed the political irony as well: The former president of Peru, Alberto Fujimori, dissolved Congress in 1992 to gain unrestricted power, whereas now, his daughter’s political party is facing a similar fate with the closure of the legislature. In a separate opinion piece, Jorge Eduardo Benavides stated that "almost thirty years after Fujimori dissolved Congress to launch his criminal organization, the boomerang he threw has been returned [to his political movement, Fujimorism]. This time, however, in an impeccable democratic exercise."

=== Politicians ===
Several lawmakers, particularly Fujimorists and other opposition members, characterized President Vizcarra’s dissolution of Congress as a “coup” or “self-coup.” Right-leaning congress members suggested that Vizcarra was collaborating with leftist factions, warning that his actions risked steering Peru toward “another Venezuela.” Jorge Del Castillo, former Mayor of Lima and attorney, urged the Peruvian armed forces and national police to withhold support from what he called a “coup d’état,” predicting that Vizcarra and his ministers would face imprisonment. Juan Sheput, co-founder of the Contigo party, similarly criticized Vizcarra, describing him as behaving “like any dictator” in seeking to dissolve Congress.

=== Public opinion ===
Public reaction was generally favorable. Public opinion polls by the Institute of Peruvian Studies (IEP) showed that 84% of respondents approved of Vizcarra's move to dissolve Congress. A similar poll by Peruvian pollster CPI found 89.5% of respondents supported the dissolution of Congress.

== See also ==
- 2022 Peruvian political crisis
