= Peruvian self-coup =

Peruvian self-coup may refer to:

- 1992 Peruvian self-coup, a successful coup performed by President Alberto Fujimori
- 2022 Peruvian self-coup attempt, an unsuccessful coup attempted by President Pedro Castillo
