= 2022 Peruvian self-coup attempt =

Attempt by President Pedro Castillo to dissolve the Congress of Peru

- Part of the Peruvian political crisis (2016–present)
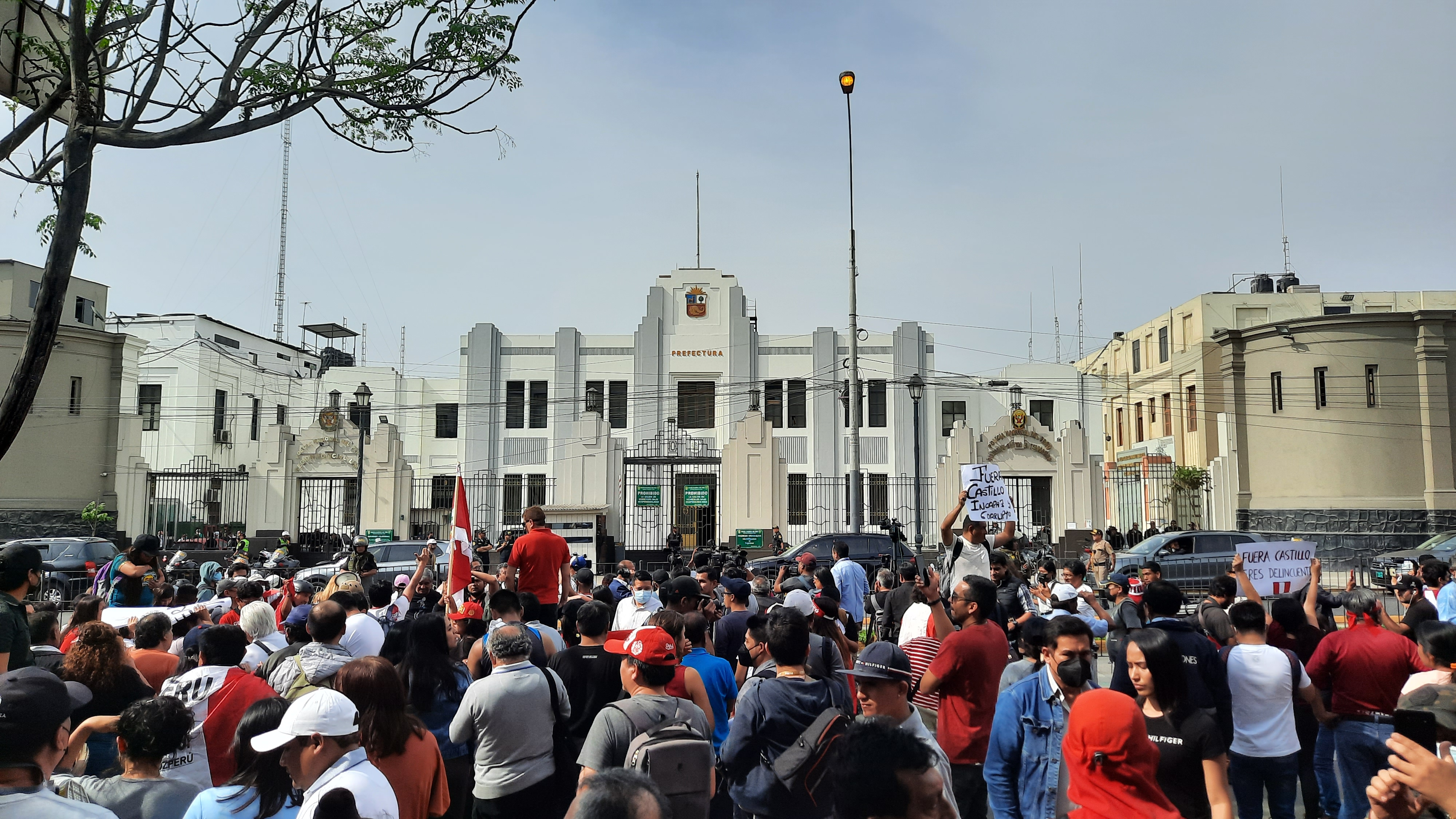
- Protests outside the Lima Prefecture, where Pedro Castillo was detained following the self-coup attempt
Date	7 December 2022
Location	Lima, Peru
Result	Presidential defeat; Failure to dissolve Congress of Peru; Removal and arrest of Pedro Castillo; Congress swears in First Vice President Dina Boluarte as President of Peru; Start of the pro-Castillo protests

Belligerents
Government of Peru; President of Peru	Congress of Peru; Supreme Court of Peru; Public Ministry of Peru; Constitutional Court of Peru; National Board of Justice; First Vice President of Peru; Council of Ministers; Armed Forces of Peru; National Police of Peru; Supporting Parties: Popular Force; Popular Renewal; Advance Country; Alliance for Progress

Commanders and leaders
Pedro Castillo (surrendered); Betssy Chávez; Aníbal Torres; Willy Huerta	José Williams; Martha Moyano; Alejandro Muñante; Dina Boluarte; Elvia Barrios; Patricia Benavides; Keiko Fujimori; Rafael López Aliaga

On 7 December 2022, Pedro Castillo, the then-President of Peru, made an attempt to dissolve the Congress amidst looming removal proceedings. This move included the immediate imposition of a curfew, an attempt to establish an emergency government, and a call for the formation of a constituent assembly. Prior to this, Attorney General Patricia Benavides had accused Castillo of leading a criminal organization. She had urged the Congress to remove him from office, leading to the third impeachment attempt against Castillo. Castillo defended his actions by arguing that the Congress had obstructed many of his policies and had colluded with the Constitutional Court to undermine the executive branch, thereby creating a "congressional dictatorship". He also advocated for the immediate election of a constituent assembly, a demand that had been echoed since the 2020 Peruvian protests.

Castillo's decision to dissolve Congress led to a wave of resignations from his government. The Peruvian Armed Forces also declined to support his actions. On the same day, Castillo was removed and ceased to be president after the Constitutional Court rejected his dissolution of Congress. Vice President Dina Boluarte was sworn in as the new president later that day. In the aftermath of Castillo's removal, his supporters initiated nationwide protests demanding his release and Boluarte's resignation. The Boluarte government responded by declaring a national state of emergency on 14 December, massacring protesters in the Ayacucho massacre, and suspending some constitutional protections for 30 days. Castillo was subsequently placed in pre-trial detention for 18 months on charges of rebellion and conspiracy, with an additional 36 months of detention for alleged corruption during his administration.

Castillo maintained that two contentious votes of confidence between his former Prime Minister Aníbal Torres and Congress provided a legal basis for dissolving the legislative body. However, this claim was disputed by a Constitutional Court ruling, which stated that only Congress could interpret whether a motion of confidence had occurred, thereby consolidating more power in the hands of Congress. This event was widely characterized as an attempted coup d'état by Peruvian politicians, the Constitutional Court, Peruvian media, and some international news organizations, drawing comparisons to the autogolpe of Alberto Fujimori during the 1992 Peruvian self-coup d'état.

Representatives of many foreign countries, including Spain, the United States, Brazil, Uruguay and the secretary-general of the Organization of American States rejected Castillo's actions and described them as an attempt to break the constitutional order. According to an Institute of Peruvian Studies poll, 53% of respondents disagreed with his attempt to dissolve Congress, while 44% of participants agreed. Supporters of Castillo said that a soft coup was perpetrated by Congress against him. Some governments of Latin America, including Argentina, Bolivia, Colombia, Honduras and Mexico, responded to the crisis by refusing to recognize the Boluarte government and viewing Castillo as president. Castillo has also continued to consider himself as the legal president of Peru.

== Background ==
=== Congressional obstruction ===
During the presidencies of Ollanta Humala, Pedro Pablo Kuczynski and Martín Vizcarra, the Congress was dominated by the opposition Popular Force, the party created by the daughter of the former Peruvian president Alberto Fujimori, Keiko Fujimori, and opposed many of the actions performed by the presidents. The political legacy of the Fujimori family was assumed by Keiko. During their majority in congress, Fujimorists "earned a reputation as hardline obstructionists for blocking initiatives popular with Peruvians aimed at curbing the nation’s rampant corruption". Following the 2021 Peruvian general election, a significant bloc of right wing parties, including Go on Country, Popular Force and Popular Renewal, exercised significant influence in Congress.

==== Constitutional crisis and removal of presidents ====
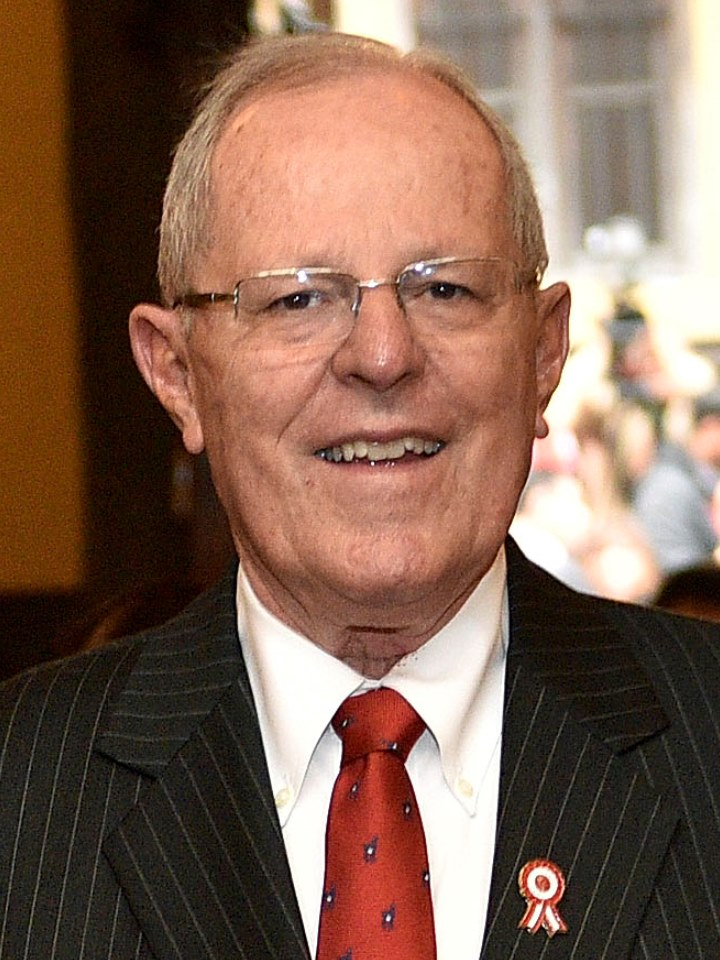
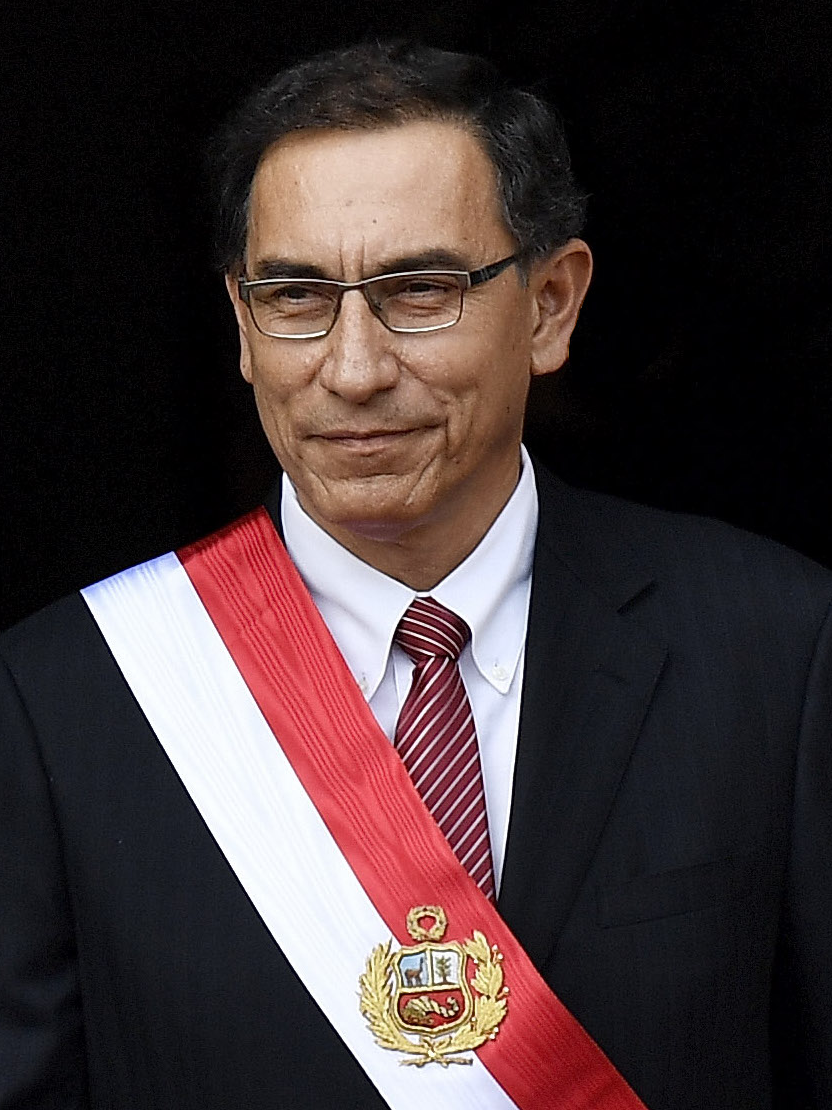
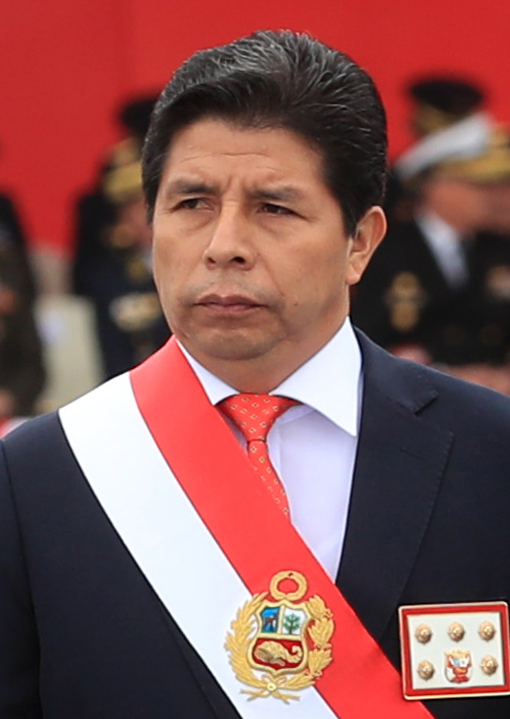
Presidents Pedro Pablo Kuczynski, Martín Vizcarra and Pedro Castillo (left to right), impeached and targeted for removal by the opposing Congress

In the Constitution of Peru, the executive branch can dissolve congress after a second vote of no-confidence. Under former president Pedro Pablo Kuczynski, Congress held a no-confidence vote on 15 September 2017, resulting in the collapse of his cabinet, the first vote of no-confidence by the current congressional body. President Kuczynski would later face impeachment in December 2017 and March 2018 due to his admitted involvement with Odebrecht during the Operation Car Wash scandal. Following the release of the Kenjivideos reportedly showing Kuczynski making deals with opposition politicians to avoid impeachment votes, President Kuczynski resigned.

Martín Vizcarra, Kuczynski's first vice president, then assumed office in March 2018. President Vizcarra enacted a constitutional process on 29 May 2019 that would create a motion of no confidence towards Congress if they refused to cooperate with his proposed actions against corruption. For the next four months, Congress delayed bills targeting corruption and postponed general elections proposed by Vizcarra. On 30 September 2019, the President of the Council of Ministers, Salvador del Solar, set forth a vote of confidence before the Congress for refusing to pass a bill that modified the election process of judges of the Constitutional Court. The vote of confidence sought to stop the election of magistrates, modify the Organic Law of the Constitutional Court and the designation of the tribunes. However, the Plenary Session of Congress decided to continue with the election of magistrates, and ignored the vote of confidence presented by Del Solar, naming a new member to the Constitutional Court. Many of the Constitutional Court nominees selected by Congress were alleged to be involved in corruption. Notwithstanding the affirmative vote, Vizcarra stated that the appointment of a new member of the Constitutional Court and an ignoring of the confidence motion constituted a de facto vote of no confidence in the government, which would be the second of the legislative term. These actions by Congress, as well as the months of slow progress towards anti-corruption reforms, pushed Vizcarra to dissolve the legislative body on 30 September, with Vizcarra stating "Peruvian people, we have done all we could." Shortly after Vizcarra announced the dissolution of Congress, the legislative body refused to recognize the president's actions, declared Vizcarra as suspended from the presidency, and named Vice President Mercedes Aráoz as the interim president, moves that were largely seen as null and void. By the night of 30 September, Peruvians gathered outside of the Legislative Palace to protest against Congress and demand the removal of legislators while the heads of the Armed Forces met with Vizcarra, announcing that they still recognized him as president and head of the armed forces. On 14 January 2020, the Constitutional Court ruled that the dissolution of Congress by Vizcarra under the given rationale was legal. Snap legislative elections were held on 26 January, with Keiko Fujimori's Popular Force party losing its majority in Congress and most of its seats.

Months later, amid the COVID-19 pandemic in Peru, President Vizcarra was impeached in September 2020 though not removed, later being controversially removed from office a month later. Thousands of citizens then gathered in protests against Vizcarra's impeachment. Manuel Merino, who succeeded him as president the following day, resigned on 15 November. Francisco Sagasti was made President of Congress on 16 November and thus succeeded Merino as president on 17 November per the presidential line of succession, since both vice presidential positions were vacated by Vizcarra in 2018 and Mercedes Aráoz in May 2020.

=== Castillo presidency ===
Sagasti served as president until Castillo was elected in the 2021 general election, with Keiko Fujimori losing her third consecutive presidential bid. The 2021 election saw many right-wing candidates elected to the congress.

==== Attempts to remove Castillo ====
The election will be flipped, dear friends.

— Keiko Fujimori

Multiple attempts to prevent Castillo from entering the office of the presidency or to later remove him occurred, beginning shortly after election results were determined. Following reports of Castillo's apparent victory, Fujimori and her supporters made claims of electoral fraud, leading obstructionist efforts to overturn the election with support of citizens in Lima. Many business groups and politicians refused to recognize Castillo's ascent to the presidency, with those among the more affluent, including former military officers and wealthy families, demanded new elections, promoted calls for a military coup, and used rhetoric to support their allegations of fraud.

Following the 2021 election, audio recordings deemed Vladi-audios were leaked revealing that Vladimiro Montesinos was allegedly involved in at least 17 landline phone calls while imprisoned at the Peruvian Navy's CEREC maximum security prison in an effort to prevent Castillo from entering office and to protect Keiko Fujimori from being imprisoned. In one reported audio, Montesinos mentions a first plan to have Fujimori's husband go to the United States embassy in Lima to present "documentation of the fraud" to the Office of Regional Affairs and Central Intelligence Agency, with Montesinos allegedly saying he already contacted the embassy, that the documents would reach President Joe Biden and that his administration would condemn the election as interference from Cuba, Nicaragua, and Venezuela, subsequently giving Fujimori's claims of fraud more weight. Right-wing politicians in Peru downplayed the audios of Montesinos. According to IDL-Reporteros, the Navy of Peru was involved in a "lie" when issuing their joint statement, saying that Montesinos was only involved in two phone calls, with IDL asking "How could you not notice the 17 calls and 12 conversations at CEREC, at the Naval Base of the institution with the greatest development in electronic intelligence within the Armed Forces?".

In October 2021, the website El Foco released recordings revealing that leaders of the manufacturing employers' organization National Society of Industries, the leader of the Union of Multimodal Transport Guilds of Peru (UGTRANM), Geovani Rafael Diez Villegas, political leaders, and other business executives planned various actions, including funding transportation strikes in November 2021, to destabilize the Castillo government and prompt his removal. Far-right groups of former soldiers also allied with political parties like Go on Country – Social Integration Party, Popular Force, and Popular Renewal in an effort to remove Castillo, with some veteran leaders seen directly with Rafael López Aliaga and Castillo's former presidential challenger Keiko Fujimori, who signed the Madrid Charter promoted by the Spanish far-right political party Vox. These groups directed threats towards Castillo government officials and journalists, whilst also calling for a coup d'état and insurgency.

==== Impeachment attempts ====
From the beginning of his presidency, Castillo was targeted by Congress, dominated by the opposition right-wing parties, whom made it clear that they wanted to remove him from office by impeachment. Due to broadly interpreted impeachment wording in the Constitution of Peru (1993), Congress can impeach the president on the vague grounds of "moral incapacity", effectively making the legislature more powerful than the executive branch.

In November 2021, four months into Castillo's term, Fujimori announced that her party was pushing forward impeachment proceedings, arguing that Castillo was "morally unfit for office". On 25 November 28 legislators from Fujimori's party presented a signed motion of impeachment to Congress, setting up a vote for opening impeachment proceedings. The impeachment proceeding did not occur, as 76 voted against proceedings, 46 were in favor, and 4 abstained, with the requirement of 52 favoring proceedings not met.

In February 2022, it was reported that Fujimorists and politicians close to Fujimori organized a meeting at the Casa Andina hotel in Lima with the assistance of the German liberal group Friedrich Naumann Foundation, with those present including President of Congress Maricarmen Alva, at which plans to remove Castillo from office were discussed. Alva had already shared her readiness to assume the presidency if Castillo were to be vacated from the position and a leaked Telegram group chat of the board of directors of Congress that she heads revealed plans coordinated to oust Castillo.

A second impeachment attempt related to corruption allegations did make it to proceedings in March 2022. On 28 March 2022, Castillo appeared before Congress calling the allegations baseless and for legislators to "vote for democracy" and "against instability", with 55 voting for impeachment, 54 voting against, and 19 abstaining, thus failing to reach the 87 votes necessary.

Public approval of Castillo steadily declined to a record low 20% approval, as his presidency progressed and protests occurred in early 2022 as a result of increasing prices with crises surrounding the president arising steadily. In October 2022, Attorney General Patricia Benavides declared that President Castillo was the head of a criminal organization and called on Congress to remove him from office, though this act was described as unconstitutional due to its violation of Article 117 of the Constitution of Peru according to constitutional experts. Castillo would respond to the efforts by Benavides and Congress by saying he was not corrupt, stating such acts were "unconstitutional, illegal, unfounded and lack any corroboration" and that a "coup d'état" was in process against him. By December 2022, Congress had begun motions to attempt the impeachment of Castillo for a third time; he was involved with six different criminal investigations and had already named five separate cabinets to serve under him.

=== Congress replaces Constitutional Court ===
Members of the United States Congress expressing concern about Constitutional Court nominees in a 2023 letter

Congress attempted to nominate members of the Constitutional Court of Peru in the past who would serve their political interests. Attempted reform of the nomination process had already resulted with the 2019 Peruvian constitutional crisis, which saw Congress being dissolved by President Vizcarra. In May 2022, six of seven members of the court were replaced by Congress in a process that lacked transparency. The replacement of the justices resulted with the Constitutional Court serving the interests of Congress. Fifteen members of the United States Congress would later express concerns about reports of the Congress of Peru attempting control governmental institutions through "legislative overreach", specifically noting the nominations of the Constitutional Court.

=== No-confidence law ===
In the Constitution of Peru, the executive branch can dissolve Congress after a second vote of no-confidence. Following the election of Castillo, Congress, with the help of the legislator-elected Constitutional Court of Peru, attempted to limit the power of the executive branch by creating a new law that would only allow a question of confidence to be allowed for government policies, not for constitutional law. The Castillo government would argue that this was unconstitutional, though the Constitutional Court would ultimately side with Congress. When Héctor Valer was named Prime Minister of Peru in February 2022, allegations of domestic violence resulted with Congress not giving him a vote of confidence, with Valer arguing that this was in effect a vote of no-confidence.

On 8 November 2022, Prime Minister Aníbal Torres presented a question of confidence regarding the proposed question of confidence law of Congress, though Congress opposed and filed the request. Upon Congress' refusal, Prime Minister Torres would state on 11 November, "We have declared before Parliament a prerogative of the Executive, as is the question of trust. Today we know the answer." Torres would present a second question of confidence on 17 November 2022; this second motion was also rejected by Congress on 24 November and provided an opportunity for Castillo to dissolve Congress according to France 24. This interpretation was later rejected by the Constitutional Court in a May 2023 judgement.

=== Military involvement ===
In the day before the attempt to dissolve Congress, Chief of the Joint Command General Manuel Gómez de la Torre held a meeting with the branch heads of the armed forces of Peru.

=== Attempts to remove Boluarte ===
For months, opposition politicians attempted to disqualify Boluarte in an effort to assume the presidency upon her removal. On 5 December 2022, just days before Congress was set to vote on impeaching Castillo, a constitutional complaint was filed by the Subcommittee on Constitutional Accusations against Vice President Dina Boluarte, alleging that she operated a private club while she was the Minister of Development. The allegations against Boluarte created the potential for the vice president to face controversy if Castillo were to be impeached.

== Timeline of events ==
=== Preparations for impeachment ===
In the weeks before the third impeachment, the media in Peru launched a smear campaign of unsubstantiated claims against President Castillo according to Le Monde diplomatique, with the Latin American Strategic Center for Geopolitics (CELAG) finding that 79% of media articles about Castillo being "negative". On 6 December, it was likely that Congress did not have 87 votes to remove President Castillo from office. President Castillo's attorney, Benji Espinoza, spent the day with the president discussing how to respond to the situation, later stating that during the six hours she spent with him "at no time was the issue of the dissolution of Congress addressed". That same day, Chief of the Joint Command General Manuel Gómez de la Torre held a meeting with the branch heads of the armed forces of Peru. During the meeting, General Gómez de la Torre warned the branch heads of a pending conflict, stating "I am responsible. There are no other orders". Commanding general of the Army of Peru, Wálter Córdova, also submitted his resignation on 6 December, with the submission being approved the next morning.

=== Dissolution of Congress ===
On 7 December 2022, Congress was expected to file a motion of censure against Castillo, accusing him of "permanent moral incapacity". Before the legislative body could gather to file its motion, Castillo announced the dissolution of Congress and enacted an immediate curfew. In his speech, Castillo stated:

[T]he majority of Congress, which defends the interests of the big monopolies and oligopolies, has done everything to try to destroy the institution of the presidency ... The Executive has sent to Congress more than 70 bills of national interest with the aim of benefiting the most vulnerable sectors of the population, such as the Massification of Gas, the creation of the Ministry of Science and Technology and Innovation, Free Admission to Universities, the Second Agrarian Reform, the Tax Reform, the Reform of the Justice System, the elimination of the subsidiary economic activity of the State Congress sought to prosecute the president for treason with unsustainable and absurd arguments from one of constitutionalist jurists, ... Without the slightest evidence, Congress charged the president with crimes many times, often based on claims made by a mercenary, corrupt and cynical press, which defames and slanders in absolute debauchery. However, the congress does not investigate and sanction criminal acts of its own members. Congress has destroyed the rule of law, democracy, separation, and balance of powers by modifying the Constitution with ordinary laws to destroy the Executive and establish a congressional dictatorship with the endorsement, as they themselves state, of the Constitutional Court. ... The following measures are dictated: to temporarily dissolve the Congress of the Republic and establish an exceptional emergency government. Elections will be called for a new Congress with constituent powers to draft a new Constitution within no more than nine months.

He then called on individuals possessing illegal weapons to deliver them to the National Police within 72 hours and ordered all troops of the Peruvian Army to remain at their barracks, saying that he did not want clashes between citizens and the military.

Castillo would later explain his actions, saying that he never attempted to subvert Peru's democracy and only sought "to get closer to the people", stating "I took the flag of the Constituent People's Assembly and gave my speech remembering and being faithful to the people who voted for me, who trusted me. ... I wanted to make the political class understand that popular power is the maximum expression of societies. I didn't want to obey the social economic power groups. I wanted to put the people above all else. ... It was my decision. No one else's. I was nervous, but I did it." He would also say that his ministers were unaware of his announcement.

=== Reactions ===
Democratic institutions and civil society quickly rejected Castillo's actions, Moments after Castillo's speech, multiple ministers resigned from his government, including Prime Minister Betssy Chávez, Minister of Labor Alejandro Salas, Minister of the Economy Kurt Burneo, Minister of Foreign Relations César Landa and Minister of Justice Félix Chero. Peru's permanent representatives to the United Nations and to the Organization of American States, Manuel Rodríguez Cuadros and Harold Forsyth, also tendered their resignations. The attorney representing Castillo dropped him as a client, stating: "As a lawyer respectful of the Constitution, I assumed the defense of the President of the Republic presuming his innocence. Since there has been a breach of the constitutional order, I am obliged to irrevocably renounce the defense of citizen Pedro Castillo."

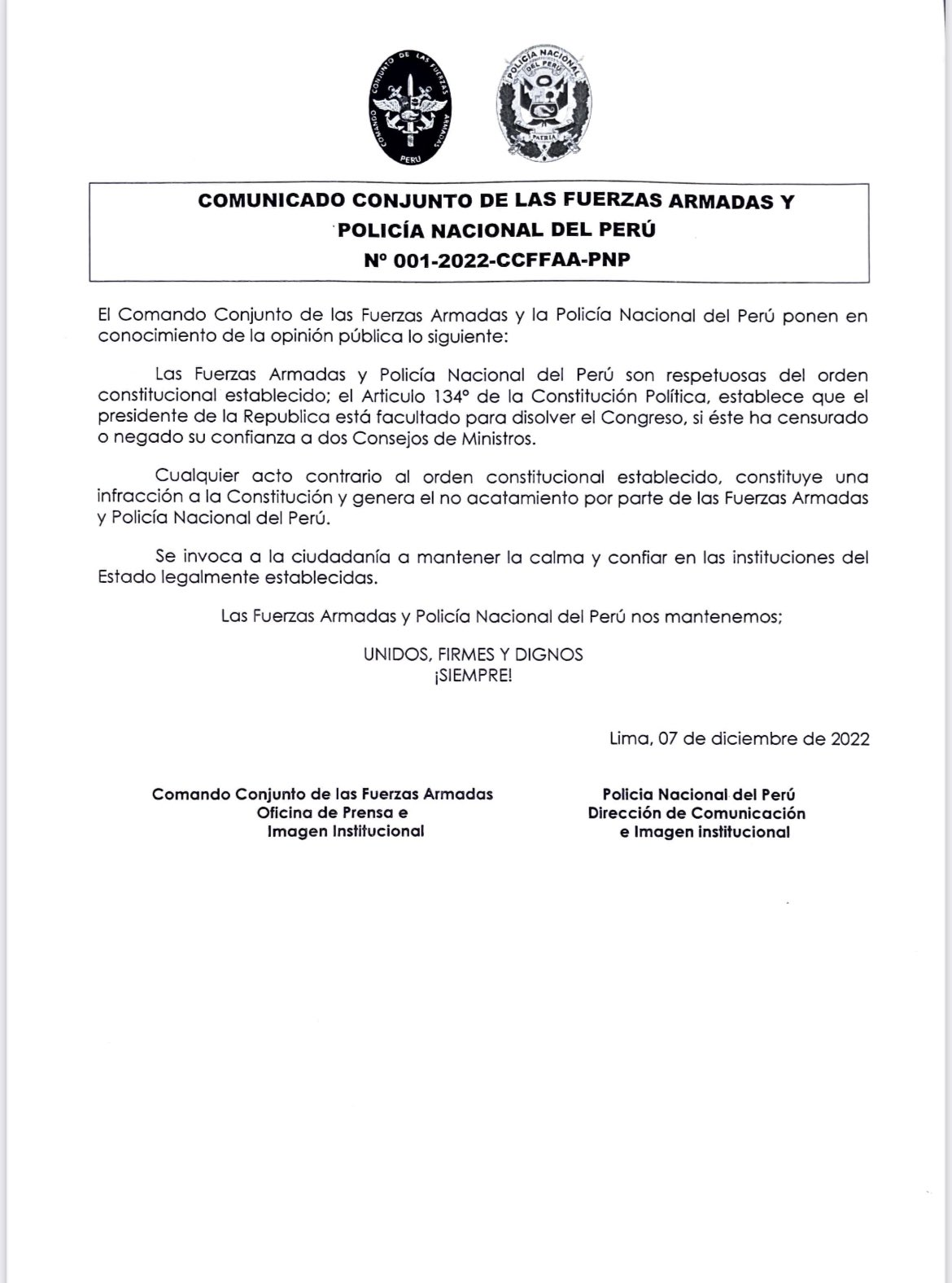
Document of the CCFFAA and PNP rejecting the actions of Castillo

The Constitutional Court released a statement: "No one owes obedience to a usurping government and Mr. Pedro Castillo has made an ineffective coup d'état. The Armed Forces are empowered to restore the constitutional order." The Armed Forces also issued a statement rejecting Castillo's actions and calling for the maintenance of stability in Peru.

According to Anibal Garzon writing for Le Monde, the media in Peru did not report the substance of Castillo's statements, including the rationale for his actions, instead stating that he was attempting a coup.

=== Resolution ===
Rejecting Castillo's actions to dissolve the legislative body, Congress gathered and voted to remove Castillo from office due to "moral incapacity" with 101 votes in favor, 6 against and 10 abstentions. It was announced that First Vice President Dina Boluarte, who rejected Castillo's actions, would take her oath of office for the presidency at 3:00 pm PET.

President Castillo then fled the Government Palace and contacted president of Mexico Andrés Manuel López Obrador, raising concerns about political asylum. According to President López Obrador, it was likely that Castillo's phone was tapped by Peruvian intelligence, with the Mexican president reporting that Peruvian authorities entered the grounds of the Mexican embassy to prevent Castillo from entering, though this was not confirmed. Castillo said that he did not seek to leave Peru and only wanted to drop his family off at the Mexican embassy for their safety.

Upon learning that Castillo was heading to the Mexican embassy, the general of the PNP learned that his officers were the drivers for Castillo and ordered them to deliver Castillo to the Prefecture where he would be arrested. Individuals gathered outside the Mexican embassy in Lima to block the area upon rumors that Castillo was attempting to flee to seek asylum in Mexico. The PNP officers driving Castillo said that they had to make an emergency detour, later bringing him to the Prefecture where he was greeted by the head of the PNP, who arrested him, in flagrante delicto, for rebellion.

Castillo's vice president Dina Boluarte entered the Legislative Palace shortly after 3:00 pm PET and appeared before Congress, where she was later sworn in as president of Peru. According to Boluarte, Castillo's family was granted asylum by Mexico but not Castillo himself. Following Castillo's removal, his supporters started nationwide protests demanding his release and Boluarte's resignation.

== Aftermath ==
While Castillo was detained, he denounced a "Machiavellian plan" against him by the National Prosecutor Patricia Benavides, Congress and his former vice president Boluarte. Some Latin American media organizations linked the events to United States Ambassador to Peru Lisa D. Kenna, a former member of the Central Intelligence Agency. Ambassador Kenna had met with Castillo's defense minister, Gustavo Bobbio, the day before the impeachment vote, raising concerns about the United States being involved in the events. Local media also reported that the President of Congress and former head of the Peruvian armed forces, José Williams, allegedly collaborated with Ambassador Kenna.

IDL-Reporteros reported that the right-wing Congress' approval of President Boluarte was weak since they had previously attempted to disqualify her as well. President Boluarte immediately installed the right-wing leader Pedro Angulo Arana as prime minister. The Prime Minister Angulo faces multiple controversies and is involved in 13 criminal investigations, with serious allegations including sexual harassment of women assistants and supporting the actions of César Hinostroza, who illegally asked for favors from magistrate María Apaza and fled from Peru.

Supporters of Castillo were angered at the actions against the former president, demanding immediate general elections and staging nationwide protests. Protests erupted in violence on 11 December near the southern city of Andahuaylas where demonstrators closed the airport, with police in a helicopter reportedly firing upon protesters, killing two individuals. President Boluarte attempted to appease protests by proposing elections two years early, for April 2024, though Castillo supporters rejected the call while Castillo described such actions as a "dirty game". Congress initially rejected Boluarte's proposal for early elections but reversed itself on 21 December.

Castillo's trial for rebellion charges over the self-coup began on 4 March 2025. On 10 March, Castillo announced that he was going on a hunger strike, resulting in his hospitalization and the end of his hunger strike on 13 March.

In November 2025, the Supreme Court of Peru sentenced Castillo, former prime minister Betssy Chávez, and another former minister to 11.5 years in prison for criminal conspiracy relating to the coup.

== Public opinion ==
Days before the crisis, a poll by the Institute of Peruvian Studies (IEP) showed that 55% of respondents disagreed with Congress' attempt to remove Castillo from office while 43% agreed. The majority of those supporting Castillo's removal resided in Lima while those disagreeing with his impeachment lived in rural areas. In an IEP poll following Castillo's attempt to dissolve Congress, of respondents, 53% disapproved Castillo's actions, 44% approved and 3% had no opinion or comment, with the majority of support for Castillo's actions being among rural and lower class Peruvians.

After the self-coup attempt, a poll carried out at the national level by Ipsos Perú between 15 and 16 December 2022, showed that 63% of the population disagreed with the coup d'état that Pedro Castillo tried to perpetrate, while 33% agreed and 4% did not provide any response. Likewise, when asked about the reasons that would have led Pedro Castillo to take said measure, 35% indicated that this was due to the fact that the former president "feared that Congress would vote for the vacancy and remove him from office", 29% attribute it because "he wanted to intervenethe Public Prosecutor's Office and the Judiciary to disappear the files that exist against them", 25% believe that "he wanted to convene a Constituent Assembly" and 22% consider that "he wanted to govern by concentrating power, without the Congress".

== International reactions ==
=== Recognition ===
Nations recognizing presidential governments Pedro Castillo Dina Boluarte

International recognition of Boluarte's government has been mixed.

Members of the São Paulo Forum like Luiz Inácio Lula da Silva of Brazil and Gabriel Boric of Chile recognize Boluarte. The United States has recognized Boluarte as president. Spain was also in support, championing a return to "constitutional order."

Latin American governments, including Argentina, Bolivia, Colombia, Honduras, Mexico and Venezuela have continued to recognize that Pedro Castillo as the democratically elected President of Peru and refused to recognize Boluarte. Left-wing Latin American leaders such as Nicolás Maduro of Venezuela, Andrés Manuel López Obrador of Mexico, Gustavo Petro of Colombia, Alberto Fernández of Argentina, and Luis Arce of Bolivia denounced Boluarte's government as a right wing coup, comparing the situation as similar to ascension of Bolivia's Jeanine Áñez during the 2019 Bolivian political crisis. The latter presidents continue to support Pedro Castillo's claims he is the rightful president under a "government of exception."

=== Statements ===
The regional countries of Mexico, Bolivia, Colombia and Argentina issued a joint statement recording their view that Castillo is "a victim of undemocratic harassment" and pleaded for maintaining his human and legal rights.

- European Union: The European Parliament released a statement which said that: The Chair of the Delegation for Relations with the countries of the Andean Community, Pilar Del Castillo and the Chair of the EP Foreign Affairs Committee, David McAllister wish to express their total and unconditional support for the democratic institutionality and constitutional order, safeguarded thanks to the impeccable and responsible functioning and behaviour of the Peruvian authorities regarding the recent events in the Republic of Peru that led to the constitutional dismissal of President Pedro Castillo given his attempt to dissolve the Congress, They hope and wish that the new constitutional president Dina Boluarte has the support to redirect, through political dialogue and within full respect of the separation and balance of powers, the crisis generated so that Peruvian democracy can emerge from this attack fully revitalised, strengthened, more united and consolidated in defence of democratic values to achieve the highest levels of welfare and development for its citizens.
- Organization of American States: Luis Almagro, Secretary-General of the Organisation of American States, said the constitutional order had been disrupted in Peru and tweeted his "support for "democracy, peace and institutionality in Peru and the urgent need to restore the democratic path in the country".
- Human Rights Watch: Human Rights Watch released a statement saying they "categorically condemns former President Pedro Castillo's attempt to undermine the rule of law in Peru" and described the temporary dissolution of Congress, the reorganization of the judiciary and other institutions as "effectively a coup".
- Argentina: The Ministry of Foreign Affairs and Worship expressed "deep concern" over the situation in Peru and made a call on "every Peruvian politician" to "protect democratic institutions, the rule of law and constitutional order".
- Bolivia: President Luis Arce condemned the "elite harassment" against "popular governments" after the crisis in Peru, stating that "since the beginning, the Peruvian right tried to overthrow a government democratically elected by the people, by the humble classes who seek greater inclusion and social justice". He also sent his solidarity to "the sister Republic of Peru", criticizing the "constant harassment of anti-democratic elites against progressive, popular and legitimately constituted governments", and asked that "everyone" condemn this situation.
- Brazil: The Ministry of Foreign Affairs classified Castillo's actions as incompatible with the constitutional framework of Peru, representing a violation of democracy and the rule of law. The ministry wished success to Boluarte. The President-elect, Luiz Inácio Lula da Silva, stated that the removal of Castillo was "constitutional" and expressed his hope that President Boluarte succeeds in "her task of reconciling the country and leading it on the path of development and social peace."
- Chile: The government issued a statement which said that it "deeply regrets the political situation that the Republic of Peru is experiencing, and trusts that this crisis that affects a sister country can be resolved through democratic mechanisms and respect for the rule of law".
- Colombia: President Gustavo Petro said that Castillo "allowed himself to be led to political suicide" and that "he was wrong" in wanting to dissolve Congress. He also stressed, however, that "anti-democracy cannot be fought with anti-democracy."
- Ecuador: The Foreign Ministry issued a statement expressing "its deep concern about the political situation in the sister country of Peru" and calling "on all political actors to maintain the rule of law and democracy and on the international community to facilitate the democratic process in Peru".
- Honduras: The Foreign Ministry called what happened to Castillo, a coup d'état against him. It published a statement communicating its "energetic condemnation of the coup d'état that occurred in Peru, which is the result of a series of events to erode democracy and the sovereign will of the people represented by President Pedro Castillo." Honduras also demanded that Castillo's "physical integrity and human rights be respected," adding, "The government of Honduras hopes that the democratic order and electoral sovereignty of Peru retake the rule of law and guarantees its rights, amid this grave constitutional violation."
- Mexico: On 7 December, Mexican Foreign Affairs Secretary Marcelo Ebrard stated that he regretted the developments, and called for democracy to be respected. The President of Mexico Andrés Manuel López Obrador commented that "because of the interests of economic and political elites, since the beginning of the legitimate presidency of Pedro Castillo, an environment of confrontation and hostility was maintained against him, leading him to take decisions that have served his adversaries to remove him." During his morning press conference on 8 December, President López Obrador revealed he had received a call on Wednesday in which Castillo informed him of his intention to seek political asylum at the Mexican embassy. President López Obrador also stated that Mexico did not yet recognize the government of Dina Boluarte, saying that the position of Mexico would be determined in the following days. Later in the day on 8 December, Ebrard stated via Twitter that the Mexican Ambassador to Peru had met with Castillo after his arrest and that the embassy had received a letter from Castillo's lawyer officially requesting asylum. Peru declared Mexico's ambassador to Lima "persona non grata" and ordered him to leave the country on 21 December.
- Paraguay: The government expressed "its concern about the situation in Peru", and called for a "constructive dialogue between all the actors and political forces to preserve democracy and its institutions in favor of stability and pacification in that sister country."
- Spain: The Ministry of Foreign Affairs said that their government "firmly condemns the breakdown of the constitutional order in Peru and welcomes the restoration of democratic normality", stating that Spain "will always be on the side of democracy and the defense of constitutional legality." A day later, Prime Minister Pedro Sánchez announced that he had talked with Dina Boluarte and expressed to her "Spain's support in defending the Constitution and the Rule of Law".
- United States: The government rejected Castillo's actions. U.S. ambassador to Peru Lisa D. Kenna stated, "The United States categorically rejects any extraconstitutional act by President Castillo to prevent Congress from fulfilling its mandate. The United States strongly urges President Castillo to reverse his attempt to shut down Congress and allow Peru's democratic institutions to function according to the Constitution. We encourage the Peruvian public to remain calm during this uncertain time."
- Uruguay: The government made "a call to respect democratic institutions and strongly condemns any attempt to break the current constitutional order." It also hoped that the swearing in of Dina Boluarte "will lead to guaranteeing political stability and the preservation of the rule of law".
- Venezuela: President Nicolás Maduro stated that although his country does not interfere in the internal affairs of any country, he hoped that the Peruvian people, within the framework of their Constitution, will soon achieve "their path to liberation, democracy and happiness" while claiming that "they elect a teacher as president, [Pedro Castillo], and from the first moment of the election they do not want to recognize his victory, in the end forced by reality they have to recognize his victory as president, and once he is sworn in the conspiracy for a parliamentary coup begins".

== See also ==
- 2022 Germany coup d'état plot, which was also thwarted on the same day
- 2019–2020 Peruvian constitutional crisis, where President Martín Vizcarra dissolved Congress and called for snap elections
- January 6 United States Capitol attack, a failed self-coup attempt by then and current US President Donald Trump
- 1992 Peruvian self-coup, perpetrated by President Alberto Fujimori
