= 2022 Peruvian protests =

2022 Peruvian protests may refer to:

- 2021–2022 Peruvian mining protests, which protested the lack of benefit to the local community from the mining of the Las Bambas copper mine
- 2022 Peruvian economic protests, which broke out due to rising fuel prices amidst the 2022 Russian invasion of Ukraine and after the second impeachment attempt against President Pedro Castillo
- 2022–2023 Peruvian political protests, which were against the impeachment and removal of President Pedro Castillo after his failed self-coup attempt
