= Augusto Ferrero Costa =

Peruvian lawyer and politician (1944–2023)

President of the Constitutional Court of Peru
- In office 5 January 2022 – 5 September 2022
- Preceded by: Marianella Ledesma
- Succeeded by: Francisco Morales Saravia

Personal details
- Born: 3 November 1944 Lima, Peru
- Died: 25 July 2023 (aged 78) Lima, Peru
- Party: PSN
- Education: National University of San Marcos
- Occupation: Lawyer

Augusto Ferrero Costa (3 November 1944 – 25 July 2023) was a Peruvian lawyer and politician. A member of the National Solidarity Party, he served as president of the Constitutional Court of Peru from January to September 2022. He also represented Peru in freestyle and backstroke swimming, competing in two events at the 1964 Summer Olympics.

Ferrero died in Lima on 25 July 2023, at the age of 78.
