= Moisés Mamani =

Peruvian politician (1969–2020)

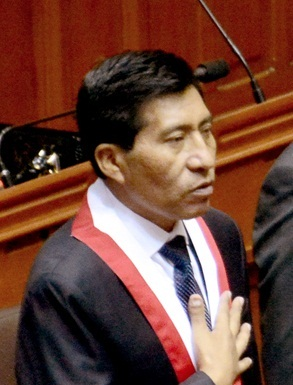
Image of Moisés Mamani

Moisés Mamani Colquehuanca (30 August 1969 — 14 August 2020) was a Peruvian Fujimorist politician who served in the Peruvian Congress for the Puno constituency from 2016 till his death in 2020.

== Life ==
He is known for instigating the Kenjivideos scandal of 2018 by revealing films of opposition legislators offering to help then-President Pedro Pablo Kuczynski avoid impeachment in exchange for political favors.

Mamani was born in Moho, Puno, and died, aged 50, in Lima. His death was reportedly from complications from COVID-19 during the COVID-19 pandemic in Peru.
