= Indira Huilca =

Peruvian politician (born 1988)

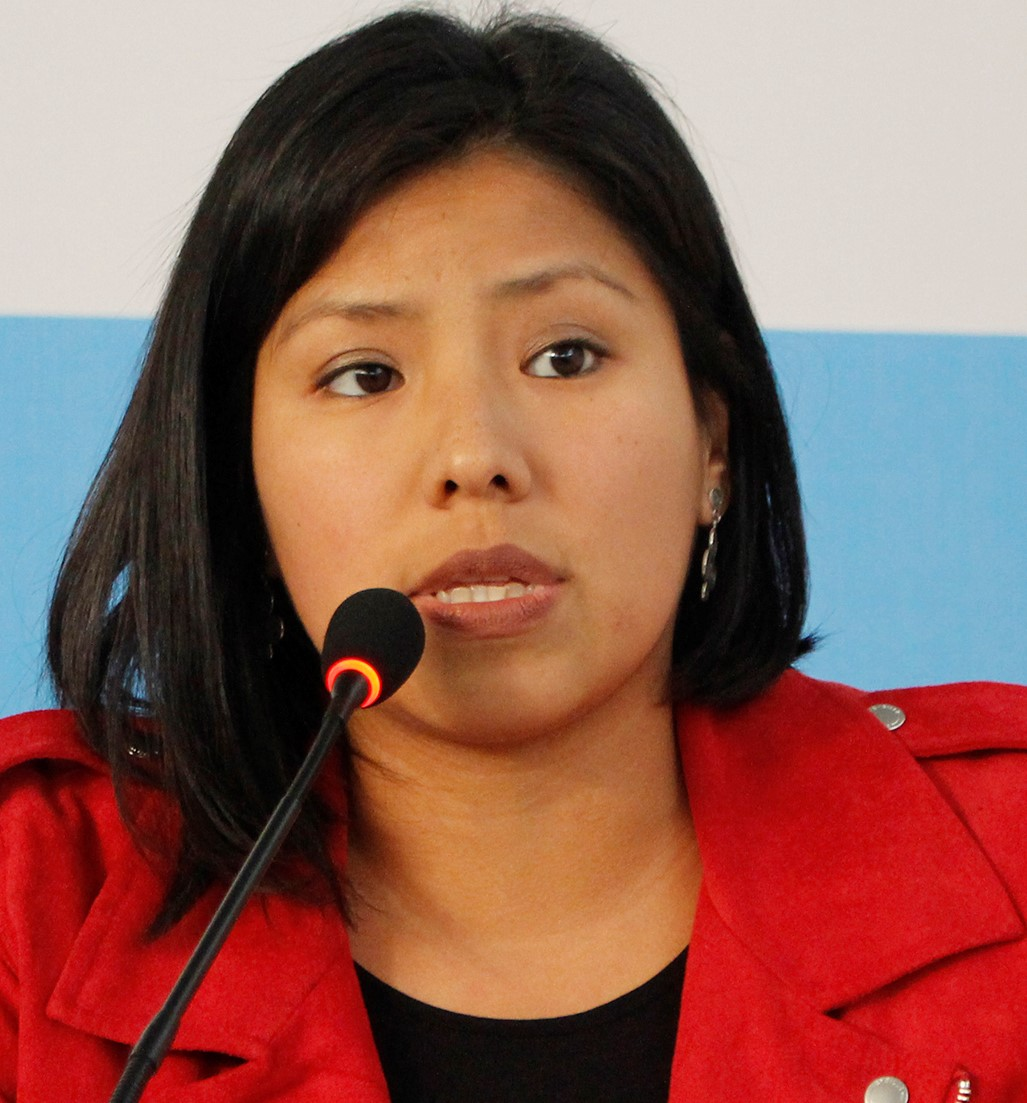
- Huilca in 2018

Member of the Chamber of Deputies
- Incumbent
- Assumed office 25 July 2026
- Constituency: Lima

Member of the Congress of the Republic
- In office 27 July 2016 – 16 March 2020
- Constituency: Lima

Personal details
- Born: 11 August 1988 (age 37)
- Party: Ahora Nación (since 2026)
- Parent: Pedro Huilca Tecse (father)

Indira Isabel Huilca Flores (born 11 August 1988) is a Peruvian politician serving as a member of the Chamber of Deputies since 2026. From 2016 to 2020, she was a member of the unicameral Congress of the Republic.
