= Carlos Ramos Núñez =

Peruvian jurist and academic (1960–2021)

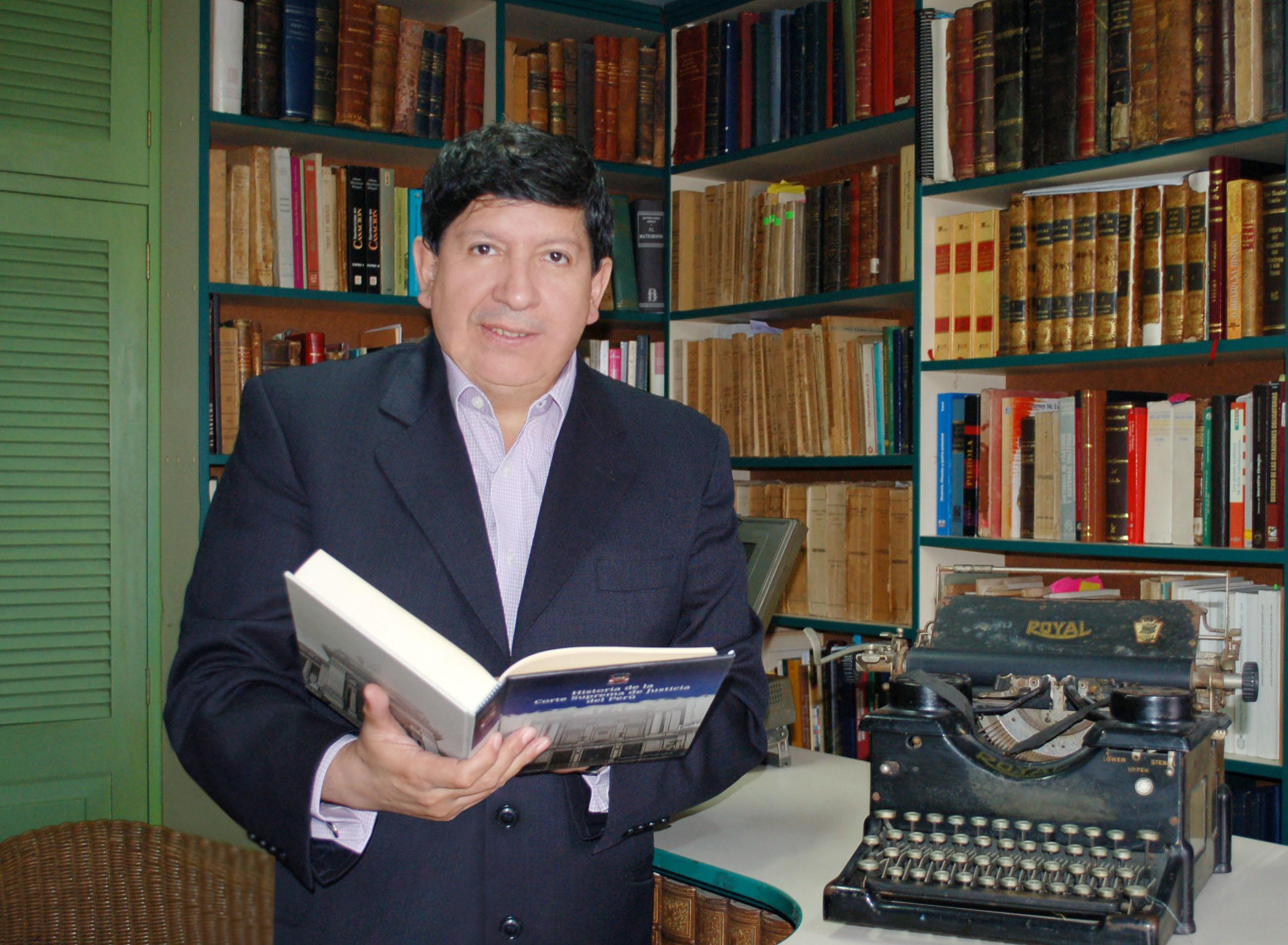
- Portrait of Dr. Carlos Ramos Núñez at his home in Lima (Peru), after an interview on the occasion of having close the publication of his new book "Cómo hacer una tesis y no envejecer en el intento"

Justice of the Constitutional Court of Peru
- In office May 21, 2014 – September 21, 2021

Personal details
- Born: September 15, 1960; Arequipa, Peruvian Republic
- Died: September 21, 2021 (aged 61); Lima, Peru

Carlos Ramos Núñez (15 September 1960 – 21 September 2021) was a Peruvian jurist and academic. He was a justice of the Constitutional Court from 2014 until his death.
