= Marianella Ledesma =

President of the Constitutional Court of Peru (2020–2022)

Marianella Leonor Ledesma Narváez

President of the Constitutional Tribunal of Peru
- In office 3 January 2020 – 3 January 2022
- Vice President: Augusto Ferrero
- Preceded by: Ernesto Blume
- Succeeded by: Augusto Ferrero

Justice of the Constitutional Tribunal of Peru
- In office 3 June 2014 – 13 May 2022
- Appointed by: Peruvian Congress
- Preceded by: Ricardo Beaumont
- Succeeded by: Helder Domínguez

Personal details
- Born: 5 May 1963 (age 63) Trujillo, Peru
- Education: National University of San Marcos; University of San Martín de Porres

Marianella Leonor Ledesma Narváez (born 5 May 1963) is a Peruvian jurist who served as the President of the Constitutional Court of Peru from 2020 to 2022.

== Early life and early career ==
Ledesma was born in Trujillo in 1963. She is the daughter of Genaro Ledesma, a senator who founded the Worker Peasant Student and Popular Front party in 1977. She earned her master's degree in 1996 from the University of San Martín de Porres, and her doctorate in 1999 from the National University of San Marcos. Ledesma has also studied in Spain, undertaking postgraduate study at the University of Salamanca in 2001.

Between her undergraduate and graduate studies, Ledesma held a succession of positions in the legal field; after completing her law degree, she served as a judge at the Superior Court of Justice of Lima, a position she held until her appointment to the Constitutional Court.

== Magistracy ==
In 2014, Ledesma was nominated to the Constitutional Court by the Peru Wins alliance; she was subsequently elected by a 99–1 vote, with 19 abstentions. She was the second woman to be appointed to the Constitutional Court of Peru, after Delia Revoredo.

As a magistrate of the Constitutional Court, Ledesma has voted against granting habeas corpus in high-profile cases of preventative detention, including in the cases of Ollanta Humala in 2018 and Keiko Fujimori in 2020. She was also the only member of the Court to vote against finding the Mulder Act, which regulates the government's advertising spending, to be unconstitutional.

In December 2019, Ledesma was elected President of the Constitutional Court. She took office in January 2020, succeeding Ernesto Blume in this position. She was the first woman to be elected to this position. At her inaugural speech, Ledesma stated that her goal as President of the court was to protect the rights of the people, giving particular emphasis to women and the poor.

In 2021, the Constitutional Court of Peru was divided into First and Second Chambers; however, as the president of the court, Ledesma was not placed into either chamber initially. The death of Carlos Ramos Núñez in September 2021 created a vacancy in the First Chamber, though, and Ledesma was then appointed to the First Chamber to fill that vacancy.
