= Constitution of Peru =

Supreme law of Peru

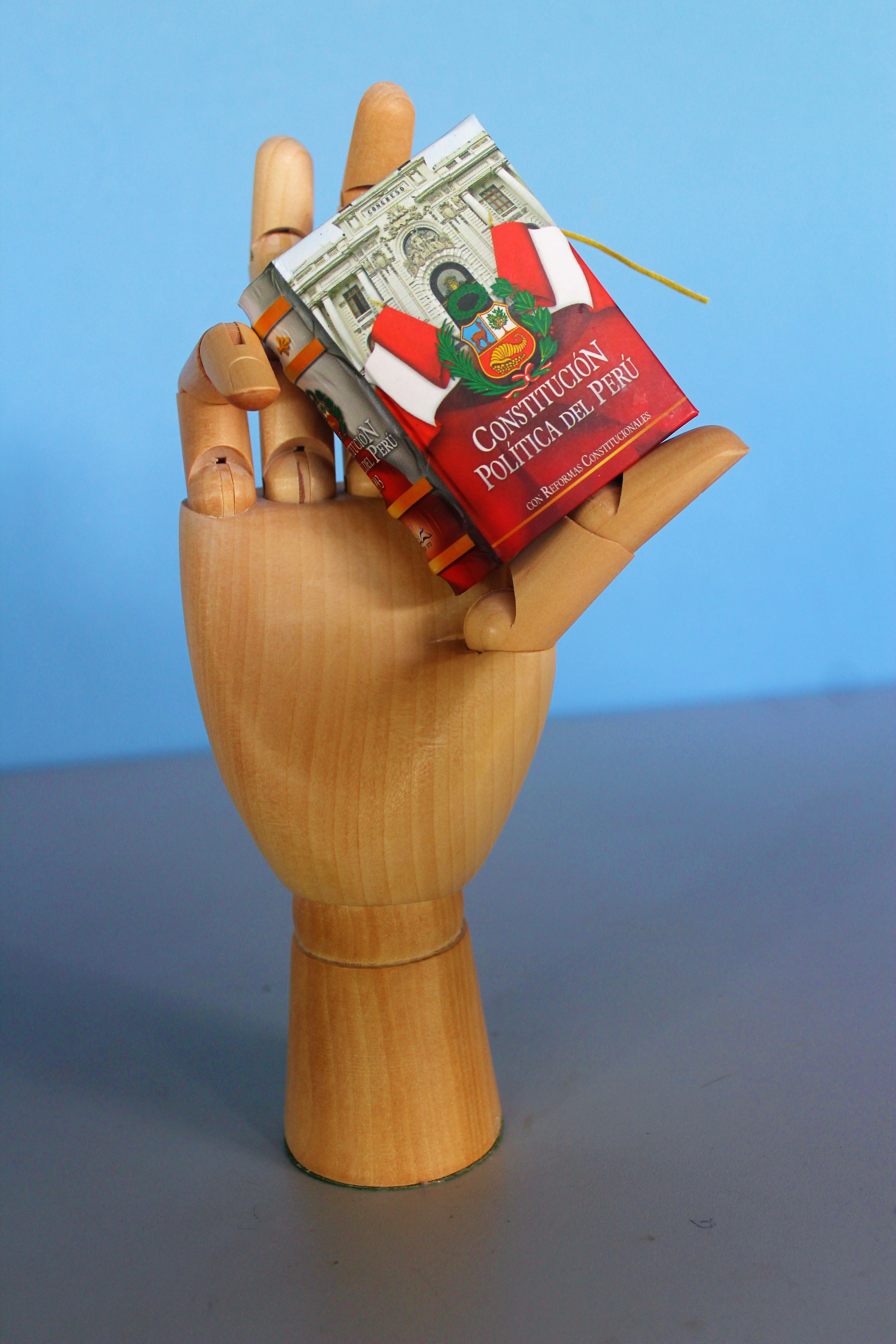
- Official exemplar of the Constitution of Peru

Overview
- Original title: Constitución Política de la República del Perú
- Jurisdiction: Peru
- Presented: December 29th 1993
- Ratified: 1993 Peruvian constitutional referendum 31 October 1993; 32 years ago
- Date effective: 1 January 1994; 32 years ago
- System: Unitary semi-presidential republic

Government structure
- Branches: Three branches (Executive, Legislature and Judiciary) plus constitutionally autonomous organizations
- Chambers: One (originally and until 2026); Two (Senate, Chamber of Deputies, since 2026)
- Executive: President–led administration and their Cabinet of Ministers
- Judiciary: Supreme Court of Peru; Constitutional Court of Peru; National Jury of Elections

History
- Amendments: 30 constitutional reformation laws (1995-2024)
- Last amended: 11 December 2024; 21 months ago (29th and 30th)
- Author: Democratic Constituent Congress
- Signatories: President Alberto Fujimori (signature erased); Members of the Cabinet of Ministers; Members of the Democratic Constituent Congress
- Supersedes: Constitution of Peru (1979)
- Constitución Política de la República del Perú at Spanish Wikisource

The Political Constitution of the Republic of Peru (Spanish: Constitución Política del Perú; Southern Quechua: Perú Suyu Hatun Kamay Pirwa 1993) is the supreme law of Peru. The current constitution, enacted on 31 December 1993, is Peru's fifth in the 20th century and replaced the 1979 Constitution. The Constitution was drafted by the Democratic Constituent Congress that was convened by President Alberto Fujimori during the Peruvian Constitutional Crisis of 1992 that followed his 1992 self-coup and dissolution of Congress, and was promulgated on 29 December 1993. A Democratic Constitutional Congress (CCD) was elected in 1992, and the final text was approved in a 1993 referendum. The Constitution was primarily created by Fujimori and supporters without the participation of any opposing entities.

The 1993 Constitution of Peru differed originally from the 1979 Constitution in that it gave greater power to the president. For example, it allowed for reelection, reduced the bicameral 240-member congress to a unicameral 120 Congress of the Republic, not only affirmed the president's power to veto found in the 1979 Constitution, but also gave him the power to use a line item veto, and mandated that all tax laws receive prior approval by the Ministry of Economics and Finance. While the Constitution of 1979 allowed the president to dissolve the Congress after it censured prime ministers three times, the 1993 constitution allows the president to do so after only two censures. The Constitution allows the president to decree laws as long as they first inform the Congress of their intent to do so. If the president dissolves Congress, the Constitution gives them the power to rule until the election of a new Congress within a four-month timeline, during which time the Standing Committee of the dissolved Congress will remain functioning. Following the ouster of President Alberto Fujimori, the Constitution was amended to bar the president from immediate re-election, a status quo that had prevailed for most of the time since the Great Depression. Subsequent constitutional amendments, laws of Congress, and Constitutional Court rulings have further changed the rules of interaction among branches of government.

To December 2024, the current Constitution of Peru had been subject to 30 amendments since 1995, most of which had been approved by Congress supermajority votes, and just 3 of those amendments had been ratified by a 2018 referendum. Since the 2020 Peruvian protests, calls for the creation of a constituent assembly have been made in Peru, with the majority of Peruvians showing approval of a new constitution in 2023.

== History ==
Peru has had twelve constitutions (1823, 1826, 1828, 1834, 1839, 1856, 1860, 1867, 1920, 1933, 1979 and 1993), four provisional statutes (1821, 1855, 1879 and 1883) and one confederate constitution during Peru–Bolivian Confederation (1837).

=== 1823 Constitution ===
The Political Constitution of the Peruvian Republic (Spanish: Constitución Política de la República Peruana) was written by the first Constituent Congress of Peru and promulgated by President José Bernardo de Tagle on November 12, 1823. It was almost completely suspended in order to allow Simón Bolívar's campaign to be planned carefully. It was re-established on June 11, 1827, and abolished the next year.

=== 1826 Constitution ===
The Constitution for the Peruvian Republic (Spanish: Constitución para la República Peruana), also known as the Lifetime Constitution (Spanish: Constitución Vitalicia) was written by Simón Bolívar and promulgated by a government council led by Andrés de Santa Cruz. It was similar to the Bolivian constitution, and a planned Colombian constitution, with the three countries being part of Bolívar's intent to establish a Federation in South America. The anti-Bolivarian sentiment that erupted in Peru at the time suspended the constitution after 49 days, with the 1823 constitution being re-established the next year.

=== 1828 Constitution ===
The Political Constitution of the Peruvian Republic (Spanish: Constitución Política de la República Peruana) was promulgated on March 18, 1828, by President José de la Mar. Despite its short duration, its importance lies in the fact that it laid the constitutional foundations of Peru, serving as a model for the following constitutions, for almost a century.

=== 1834 Constitution ===
The Political Constitution of the Peruvian Republic (Spanish: Constitución Política de la República Peruana) was approved by the National Convention in Lima and promulgated on June 10, 1834, by provisional president Luis José de Orbegoso. This document legally paved the way for the federation of Peru with Bolivia, and was soon abolished due to the establishment of the Peru–Bolivian Confederation, which itself established two constitutions for its constituent countries of North Peru and South Peru.

=== 1836 Constitutions ===
After political instability in Peru and a coup d'état in 1835, a civil war broke out between newly self-declared president Felipe Santiago Salaverry and constitutional president Luis José de Orbegoso, who allowed Bolivian president Andrés de Santa Cruz to send his troops through the Peruvian border. After the latter's triumph in 1836, assemblies were soon established to make way for the creation of the Confederation, an idea that had been floating around since the era of independence.

In Peru, two assemblies were convened: the Sicuani Assembly, which established South Peru, and the Huaura Assembly, which established North Peru. Both states' constitutions prepared the countries' union with Bolivia to create the Peru–Bolivian Confederation, first after its proclamation by decree, and then after an assembly that met in Tacna, which authored the constitution of the state.

=== 1839 Constitution ===
The Political Constitution of the Peruvian Republic (Spanish: Constitución Política de la República Peruana) was approved by a General Congress in Huancayo, leading to it being also known as the Huancayo Constitution (Spanish: Constitución de Huancayo). It was promulgated on November 10, 1839, by provisional president Agustín Gamarra, and was of conservative nature, unlike its predecessors.

=== 1856 Constitution ===
The Political Constitution of the Peruvian Republic (Spanish: Constitución de la República Peruana) was approved by the National Convention in Lima after the successful liberal revolution carried out against then president José Rufino Echenique. It was promulgated on October 19, 1856, by provisional president Ramón Castilla, and was of a very liberal character, leading to the Peruvian Civil War of 1856–1858.

=== 1860 Constitution ===
The Political Constitution of Peru (Spanish: Constitución Política del Perú) was approved by the Congress of the Republic and promulgated on November 13, 1860, by president Ramón Castilla. Due to the nature of the civil war of 1856–1858, it was a moderate constitution, agreed upon by both liberals and conservatives. It was replaced by an unpopular constitution in 1867 and then re-established on the same year.

=== 1867 Constitution ===
The Political Constitution of Peru (Spanish: Constitución Política del Perú) was approved by the Constituent Assembly on August 29, 1867, and promulgated on the same day by provisional president Mariano Ignacio Prado. Its extremely liberal nature led to a civil war which ended Prado's presidency and re-established the 1860 constitution.

=== 1920 Constitution ===
The Constitution for the Republic of Peru (Spanish: Constitución para la República del Perú) was approved on December 27, 1919, and promulgated by president Augusto B. Leguía on January 18, 1920. Of progressive nature, many of its contents were not enforced up until its replacement in 1933.

=== 1933 Constitution ===
The Political Constitution of Peru (Spanish: Constitución Política del Perú) was promulgated on April 9, 1933, by president Luis Miguel Sánchez Cerro. The Revolutionary Government of the Armed Forces of Peru established in 1968 after a successful coup d'état was the last to follow the constitution until its second phase, where president Francisco Morales Bermúdez called for a new constitution to be established and for general elections to be held.

=== 1979 Constitution ===
The Constitution for the Republic of Peru (Spanish: Constitución para la República del Perú) was promulgated on 12 July 1979 by a Constituent Assembly elected in June 1978 following 10 years of military rule and replaced the suspended 1933 Constitution. It became effective in 1980 with the re-election of deposed President Fernando Belaúnde Terry. It limited the president to a single five-year term and established a bicameral legislature consisting of a 60-member Senate (upper house) and a 180-member Chamber of Deputies (lower house). It also eliminated the literacy requirement for voting and extended suffrage to all adults 18 or older.

== Proposed reform ==
Fujimorism has held power over much of Peruvian society through maintaining control of institutions and legislation created in the 1993 constitution, which was written by Alberto Fujimori and his supporters without opposition participation. Due to broadly interpreted impeachment wording in the 1993 Constitution of Peru, the Congress can impeach the President of Peru without cause, effectively making the legislature more powerful than the executive branch. Beginning with Pedro Pablo Kuczynski, the Fujimorist Congress used this impeachment procedure liberally, also impeaching Martín Vizcarra, Pedro Castillo and Dina Boluarte.

Notable public support for a constituent assembly and a new constitution began during the 2020 Peruvian protests. Support for a new constitution increased even further following the self-coup attempt by President Castillo and the subsequent 2022–2023 Peruvian political protests. According to IEP polling from January 2023, when asked if they supported the calls for a new constituent assembly, 69% of respondents approved. Popular proposals for the new constitution include mandatory military service and legalizing the death penalty.

== See also ==
- Constitutional economics
- Constitutionalism
- Rule according to higher law
- Reglamento Provisional

== Bibliography ==
- Basadre Grohmann, Jorge (2014). Historia de la República del Perú [1822-1933]. Vol. 2. El Comercio. ISBN 978-612-306-353-5.
- Tamayo Herrera, José (1985). Nuevo Compendio de Historia del Perú. Editorial Lumen.
