= Mamanivideos scandal =

2018 vote-buying scandal in Peru

The Mamanivideos scandal (also called Keikovideos and Kenjivideos) is a political scandal that occurred in Peru in 2018 as part of the currently ongoing political crisis. It followed the release of videos filmed by Congressman Moisés Mamani showing opposition congressmen offering construction projects and special access to the presidency to help President Pedro Pablo Kuczynski avoid impeachment; this resulted in the resignation of Kuczynski.

The videos also received the names of "Kenjivideos" and "Keikovideos" because of the involvement of Congressman Kenji Fujimori and other members of his political party, and Keiko Fujimori. The name is similar to the "Vladi-videos" scandal of 2000 when Vladimiro Montesinos was filmed bribing an opposition congressman to support Alberto Fujimori's government.

== Background ==
"Pro-vacancy" and "anti-vacancy" supporters stole voters. According to the main video, the dissident block of Kenji Fujimori was seeking to persuade congressmen to vote against the vacancy.

== Discovery ==
At the beginning of 2018, complaints came from both sides over vote-buying. On March 20 Popular Force congressman Moises Mamani showed a collection of videos in which the aforementioned individuals were shown trying to bribe him. Hours later, a congresswoman from the same party, María Melgarejo from the Department of Ancash, revealed that they tried to bribe her in the same way, on behalf of a congress member of the dissident bloc.

The main media actor, Kenji Fujimori, justified the actions of his colleagues, stating "What has been seen (in the keikovideos) is a management conduct done by any authority".

== Giuffra case ==
One day after the videos were released, two audiotapes were published, on which the then head of the Ministry of Transport and Communications Bruno Giuffra can be heard using the tactics seen in the videos. Although Fujimori does not appear in these recordings, he became embroiled in the Mamani scandal.
