= Constitutional Court of Peru =

Court interpreting the Constitution of Peru

Constitutional Court
- Tribunal Constitucional
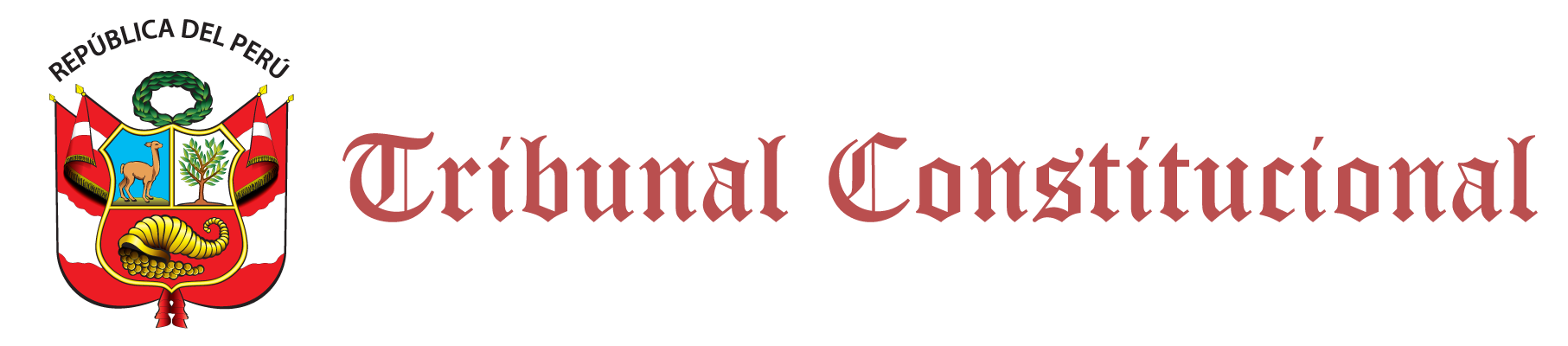
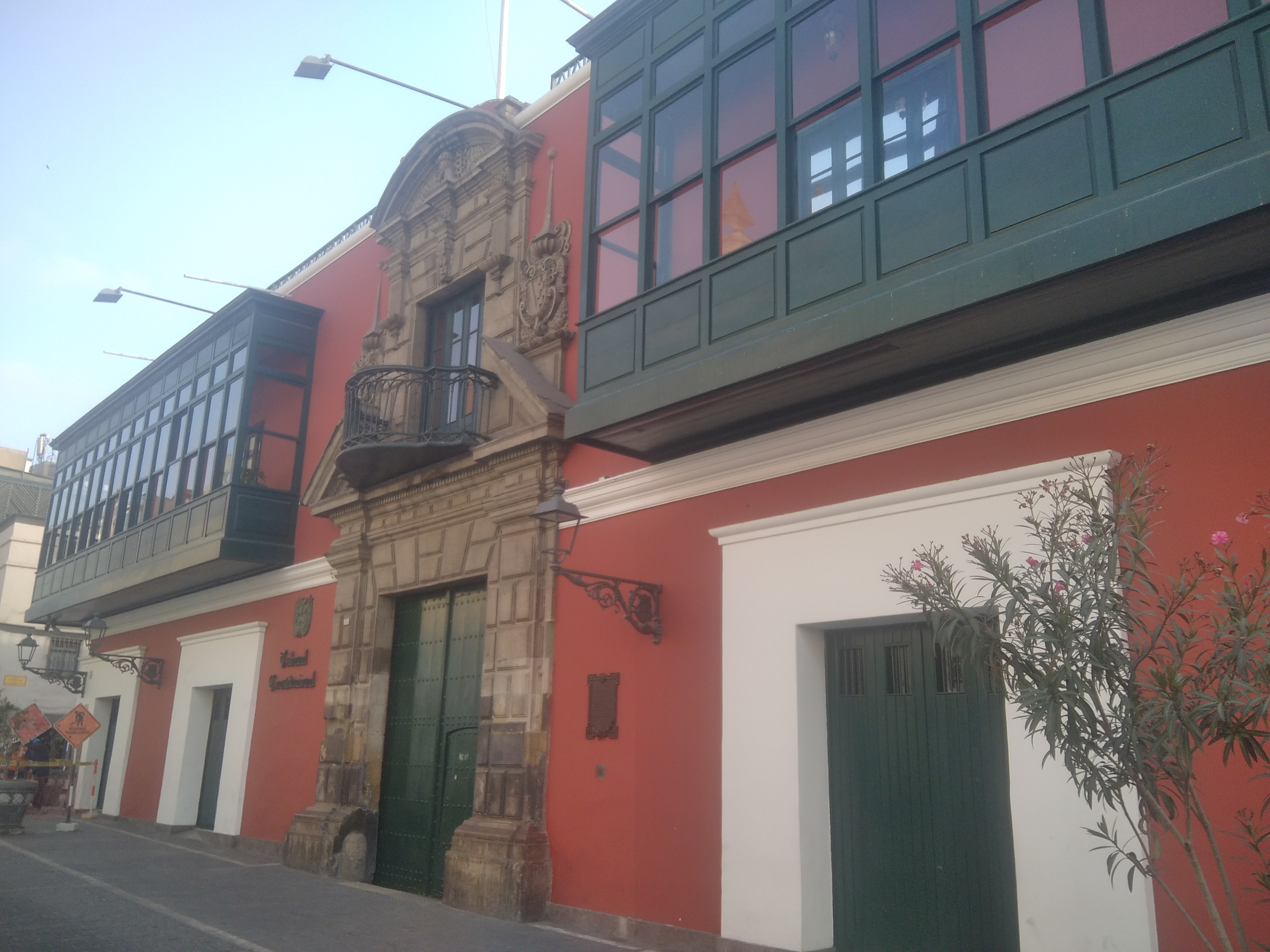
- Interactive map of Constitutional Court
- Established: 1980 (Court of Constitutional Guarantees); 1996 (Constitutional Court)
- Location: Arequipa (de jure); Lima (de facto)
- Composition method: Congress of the Republic of Peru
- Authorised by: Constitution of Peru
- Judge term length: 5 years
- Number of positions: 7
- Website: http://www.tc.gob.pe/

President of the Constitutional Court
- Currently: Luz Pacheco
- Since: 5 September 2024

The Peruvian Constitutional Court or Constitutional Tribunal is an independent constitutional agency of Peru that was established in the 1993 Constitution of Peru that was created during the government of Alberto Fujimori. The court's members are nominated by the Congress of Peru; these nominations sometimes lack transparency and are based on political favors that nominees can provide to legislators. Since May 2022, the Constitutional Court has been used to provide institutional strength to Fujimorists in Congress, according to IDL-Reporteros.

The court's historical headquarters are located in the city of Arequipa but its national operative headquarters are located in the capital city of Lima. The Constitutional Court is the highest organ of constitutional control and interpretation in the country. It is an autonomous and independent organ that is only bound by the Peruvian Constitution and its Organic Law – Law N° 28301.

== Functions ==
The Constitutional Court is entrusted with upholding the principle of constitutional supremacy, against the laws or acts of state bodies that seek to undermine it and intervenes to restore respect for the Constitution in general and constitutional rights in particular. The Court is the one specialized organ that is responsible for this type of enforcement. It has the authority to review the adequacy of laws, draft laws and decrees of the executive, conducting a review of the constitutionality of such acts.

According to Kelsen's model, the Constitutional Court acts as a negative legislator, lacking the power to make laws but with the power to repeal all or portions of the unconstitutional laws/acts. More recent theories argue that the task of the Constitutional Court strictly involves judicial functions and resolving constitutional disputes, which may include a review of the performance of the legislature, the protection of fundamental rights and the distribution of powers between the branches of government.

== Controversy ==
=== Seat nominations ===
Members of the United States Congress expressing concern about Constitutional Court nominees in a 2023 letter

Congress, which is primarily filled with opportunistic politicians that are not linked to Peruvian society, has attempted to manipulate court nominations in order to achieve political objectives. Legislators have attempted to nominate members of the Constitutional Court who would serve their political interests. In May 2022, six of seven members of the court were replaced by Congress in a process that lacked transparency according to Human Rights Watch. Following these nominations, the Constitutional Court began to serve on behalf of the Fujimorist interests within Congress.

In response to the nominations in the context of the Peruvian political crisis, fifteen members of the United States Congress expressed concerns about reports of the Congress of Peru attempting to control governmental institutions.

=== Rulings ===
Human Rights Watch stated that in 2022, the Constitutional Court "issued several rulings that were inconsistent with international human rights standards, including on same-sex marriage, Indigenous rights, and justice for crimes against humanity". The court ruled in February 2022 that the killing of 113 prisoners in 1986 by Navy officers was not a crime against humanity. In March 2022, the Constitutional Court ruled that the controversial 2017 presidential pardon of Alberto Fujimori, who was imprisoned for human rights abuses, should be reinstated. The pardon was performed by Pedro Pablo Kuczynski, with the Mamanivideos scandal showing that he had agreed to pardon Fujimori for the political favor of avoiding impeachment. The Inter-American Court of Human Rights (IACHR) denounced the move by the Constitutional Court, stating that Fujimori should remain in prison. A month later in April, the IACHR also condemned the Constitutional Court's decision to allow the government to take indigenous land without first consulting them or obtaining consent.

A ruling in February 2023 by the Constitutional Court of Peru, whose members are elected by Congress, removed judicial oversight of Congress, essentially giving Congress absolute control of Peru's government.

== Members ==
- Justice: Luz Pacheco (President)
- Justice: Helder Domínguez Haro (Vice President)
- Justice: Francisco Morales Saravia
- Justice: Luis Gutiérrez Ticse
- Justice: César Ochoa Cardich
- Justice: Manuel Monteagudo Valdez
