= Peruvian Public Ministry controversy =

2023 political controversy in Peru

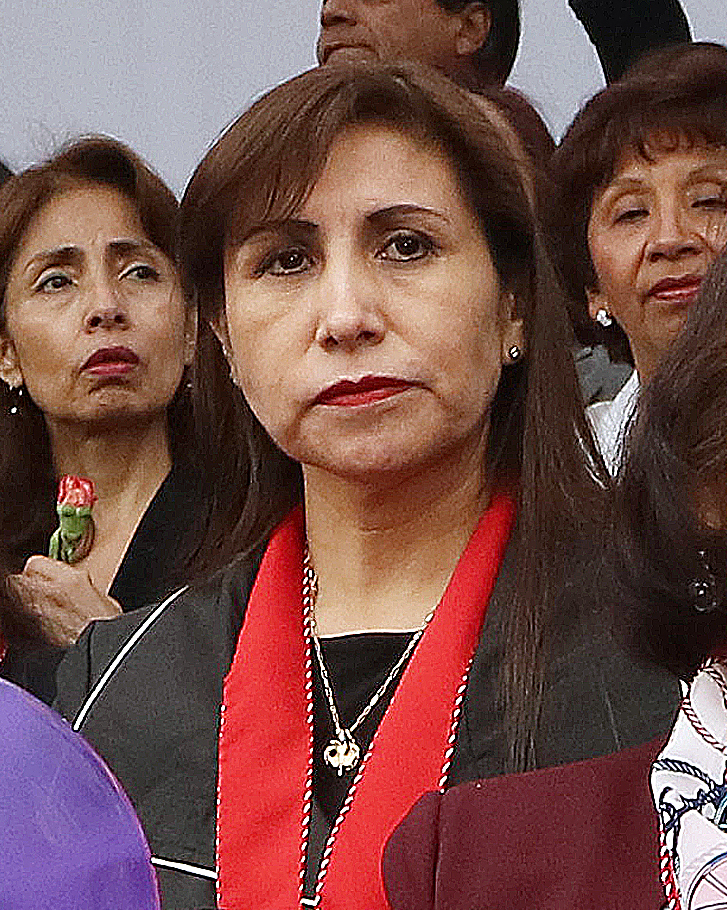
Attorney General of Peru, Patricia Benavides, the primary individual investigated in Operation Valkyrie V

An investigation surrounding the Public Ministry of Peru, known as Operation Valkyrie V (Spanish: Operación Valquiria V) resulted with a controversy surrounding the Attorney General of Peru, Patricia Benavides, who was alleged to head a criminal organization. The scandal revolved around alleged irregularities with the decisions of electing the Ombudsman of Peru Josué Gutiérrez Cóndor, dismissing former attorney general Zoraida Ávalos and attempts to remove the members of the National Board of Justice (JNJ), all in reported attempts for Benavides to main control of the Public Ministry by nominating allies in judicial positions.

Messages discovered during investigations reportedly showed Benavides collaboration with members of the Congress of Peru from Advance Country, Popular Force and We Are Peru, that thirty-seven congressmen collaborated with her and that Benavides protected certain legislators from investigations. Further testimony from Benavides' aide Jaime Villanueva to investigators said that Popular Force leader Keiko Fujimori and President of Congress Alejandro Soto Reyes supported Benavides with dissolving the JNJ while Fujimori ally Martha Moyano called for the removal of two investigators involved in the Lava Jato case.

== Background ==
=== Emma Benavides investigations ===
Peruvian attorney general Patricia Benavides' sister, judge Emma Benavides Vargas, was investigated for alleged connections to a criminal organization and reportedly releasing a pair of drug traffickers in exchange for money. Benavides fired Bersabeth Revilla, the prosecutor tasked with investigating her sister in July 2022. On 3 August 2022, Benavides denied using her position to protect her sister.

The National Board of Justice (JNJ) opened preliminary investigations of Benavides firing Revilla and her educational background in early 2023. Fujimorist lawmakers defended Benavides from being investigated by the National Board of Justice (JNJ). In March 2023, it was reported that during investigations of Benavides, she was heard in phone call audio with Antonio Camayo, a businessman involved in the Cuellos Blancos scandal and that she was allegedly attempting to obstruct investigations into audio recordings of herself and of her sister Emma. It was reported that Emma had nearly a dozen phone calls with Edwin Oviedo, the former head of the Peruvian Football Federation who was implicated as one of the main funders in the Cuellos Blancos scandal.

=== Attempted dismissal of JNJ judges ===
In mid-August 2023, Benavides filed a lawsuit to the Constitutional Court of Peru to demand an end to investigations. By late-August 2023, IDL-Reporteros wrote that Inés Tello, a member of the JNJ who was tasked with investigating Benavides, established in her preliminary report that Benavides had removed Revilla from her position in order to protect her sister Emma from charges and that she also made unexplained changes to the investigatory team of the Cuellos Blancos scandal. Tello then reportedly recommend disciplinary procedures against Benavides.

On 29 August 2023, the Constitutional Court would order the suspension of investigations against Benavides by the JNJ. Following this, Congress would attempt to remove Tello from her position on the JNJ in early September 2023, approving an expedited investigation against the JNJ. The move by Congress was condemned by some Peruvian media outlets and international NGOs; newspaper La República and a letter signed by NGOs including the Center for Justice and International Law (CEJIL), Due Process of Law Foundation, Fundación Construir, Fundación para la Justicia y el Estado Democrático de Derecho (FJEDD), Human Rights Watch, the International Commission of Jurists, Observatorio Derechos y Justicia (ODJ), Robert F. Kennedy Human Rights and the Washington Office on Latin America described the actions as a "parliamentary coup". The letter signed by the NGOs also called for the application of the Inter-American Democratic Charter. The Inter-American Commission on Human Rights, the Inter-American Court of Human Rights and the United Nations office in Peru would express concern about Congress’ actions against the JNJ and call for maintaining a balance of powers. On 16 September, thousands marched in Lima protesting against the actions of Congress and sharing support for the JNJ.

== Timeline of events ==
=== Initial arrests ===
On 25 November 2023, Judge Jorge Luis Chávez Tamariz signed the arrest warrants for Jaime Villanueva, Miguel Ángel Girao and Abel Hurtado after being presented a petition from the Special Team of Prosecutors Against the Corruption of Power's Team 3. Information about the warrants was leaked to Benavides in the evening and called a group of thirteen people, including those with arrest warrants, to meet at her office overnight, with IDL-Reporteros reporting that evidence may have may hidden or destroyed due to the advanced knowledge. The group also drafted documents to remove Marita Barreto from her position at the Special Team of Prosecutors against Corruption in Power (EFICOP), the entity that was investigating Benavides.

Villanueva, Girao and Hurtago were arrested on 27 November 2023. Villanueva was the main advisor for Benavides and a former supporter of Pedro Castillo, who became a lobbyist in the Congress of Peru following the 2022 Peruvian self-coup attempt. In leaked messages, Villanueva is seen telling congressman that only he acted on behalf of Benavides, with the chats reportedly showing his planning of the dismissal of Zoraida Ávalos and the attempted dismantling of the JNJ.

One of the leaked WhatsApp chats allegedly shows Villanueva explaining the importance to Benavides of removing Zoraida Ávalos and nominating Ombudsman of Peru Josué Gutiérrez Cóndor:

We are very worried that the election of the Ombudsman will fall. Having a head in that institution is essential because what is at stake is something much more important than the Ombudsman's Office itself. As is known, the National Board of Justice is taken by the vizcarrismo and as the prosecutor of the Nation mentioned in her speech there are very strong and dark interests in her leaving her position and the caviares (leftists) return to control the Public Ministry, ... If the National Board of Justice suspends her, for seniority Zoraida Ávalos would be the new Prosecutor of the Nation ... In that context, the Ombudsman is very important, because he is the one who presides over the commission that will elect the new National Board of Justice.

=== First responses ===
In a message flanked by two members of the Supreme Court of Peru, Benavides said that the investigation was a planned attack against her. Benavides would accuse President of Peru Dina Boluarte and Prime Minister of Peru Alberto Otárola of being responsible for the deaths during the protests that occurred from 2022 into 2023, filing a constitutional complaint against the president, with El País writing that Benavides made the complaint "at the most vulnerable moment of her administration." President Boluarte described the accusations as "despicable" and said that the attorney general was attempting to distract the public from her own investigations. Ruth Luque Ibarra of Together for Peru filed a constitutional complain against Benavides, accusing her of leading a criminal organization and influence peddling.

Prosecutor Rafael Vela said that Benavides would not resign from her position on 28 November, stating that Benavides held support from members of congress. A day later on 29 November, President Boluarte called for Benavides to resign from her position.

=== Villanueva testimony ===
Following his arrest, Jaime Villanueva became an informant regarding Benavides' actions, reporting that she led a group whose objectives were to remove the JNJ, disqualify Zoraida Ávalos and to appoint Josué Gutiérrez as Ombudsman of Peru. According to Villanueva, Benavides had a direct relationship with Popular Force leader Keiko Fujimori in order to end the Cocktails case against her. Villanueva said that Benavides built support from President of Congress Alejandro Soto Reyes and Fujimori to obtain Congressional votes for the removal of the JNJ, with the Soto agreeing to assist Benavides in return for suspending investigations against him. The aide also testified that Popular Force congresswoman Martha Moyano met with Benavides to remove two investigators, Rafael Vela and José Domingo Pérez, from investigations regarding the Lava Jato scandal, though the attorney general recommended that they should wait for further development or possible resignations.

Fujimori denied the allegations against her and said, without presenting evidence, that the statements by Villanueva were the result of a political campaign against her.

== See also ==
- Cuellos Blancos scandal
- Operation Car Wash
