= Trial of Keiko Fujimori =

- Decided: 20 October 2025
- Verdict: Dismissed

Court membership
- Judges sitting: Juana Caballero García; Nayko Coronado Salazar; Max Vengoa Valdiglesias

The trial of Keiko Fujimori, also known as the "Cocktails Case" (Spanish: Caso Cócteles), began on July 1, 2024. Fujimori, the leader of the political party Popular Force, was charged with criminal conspiracy, money laundering, obstruction of justice, and false statement in administrative procedure. The Public Ministry of Peru charged Fujimori based on alleged actions performed during 2011 and 2016 election campaigns and summoned over a thousand witnesses to substantiate the alleged crimes. The case was ultimately dismissed by the Constitutional Court of Peru in October 2025.

== Events ==
In 2016, investigations into Keiko Fujimori and her then husband, Mark Vito Villanella, began to probe the finances of raffles organized to fund the Fuerza 2011 party and Fujimori's presidential candidacy. Businessman Marcelo Odebrecht said the following years that he funded campaigns for Fujimori, Ollanta Humala and other candidates. The news website IDL-Reporteros revealed documents supporting that Odebrecht did provide funding for Fujimori's presidential campaign.

In 2021, the Public Ministry of Peru filed charges against Fujimori and 53 defendants. In May 2022, the Fujimorist-led Congress of Peru replaced 6 of 7 judges belonging to the Constitutional Court of Peru, with the court aligning itself with Congress' motives according to IDL-Reporteros.

During the trial process, the Peruvian Public Ministry controversy occurred in November 2023 when an aide for Attorney General Patricia Benavides, Jaime Villanueva, was detained and became an informant. According to Villanueva, Benavides cooperated with Fujimori to prevent the latter from being prosecuted in Cocktails Case in exchange for Congress dissolving the National Board of Justice (JNJ), which had been investigating Benavides for allegedly protecting her sister from being investigated in the Cuellos Blancos scandal. Benavides and Fujimori denied the allegations.

In October 2025, the trial was annulled by the Constitutional Court, and the case was dismissed in January 2026. Fujimori was later elected Peru's president in 2026.
