= 2018 Peruvian constitutional referendum =

- 9 December 2018

Do you approve the conformation and functions of the National Board of Justice, before the National Council of the Magistracy?
Yes	86.57%
No	13.43%

Do you approve the regulation of the financing of political organizations?
Yes	85.78%
No	14.22%

Do you approve the prohibition of immediate re-election of parliamentarians?
Yes	85.82%
No	14.18%

Do you approve the establishment of bicamerality in the Congress of the Republic?
Yes	9.48%
No	90.52%

A constitutional referendum was held in Peru on 9 December 2018, alongside the second round of gubernatorial elections. Proposed by President Martín Vizcarra, the referendum aimed to tackle widespread political corruption in the country. The referendum sought public approval for four constitutional reforms: restructuring the National Council of the Magistracy (later renamed the National Board of Justice), regulating political party financing, prohibiting the immediate re-election of parliamentarians, and reinstating a bicameral parliament.

Of the four proposals, three were approved by an overwhelming majority of voters. These included the reforms concerning the National Board of Justice, political party financing, and parliamentary re-election. However, the proposal to reintroduce bicamerality was decisively rejected, largely due to modifications made by Congress that weakened presidential powers, leading Vizcarra to withdraw his support for the measure.

== Background ==
=== Odebrecht scandal ===
Following the Odebrecht scandal which saw four former presidents involved in corruption scandals, Peruvians demanded government accountability regarding corruption. Following the resignation of president Pedro Pablo Kuczynski, new president Martín Vizcarra stated upon being sworn in on 23 March 2018 that Peruvians had "had enough" of corruption, promising to lead an anti-corruption movement.

=== Vizcarra-Fujimorism relations ===
After being a minister, Vizcarra faced opposition from Fujimorists. Fujimorism was led by Keiko Fujimori, daughter of Alberto Fujimori, a former president imprisoned for corruption and crimes against humanity.

When Vizcarra took office as president, the Fujimorists, which held the majority of seats in Congress, immediately began to oppose Vizcarra's projects.

== Process ==
=== Proposal ===
On 28 July 2018, during his Annual Message to the Nation, Vizcarra proposed a national referendum to approve four constitutional amendments aimed at addressing corruption. These reforms sought to: (1) restructure the National Council of the Magistracy, the body responsible for appointing judges and prosecutors, (2) prohibit private funding for political campaigns, (3) ban the reelection of parliamentarians, and (4) reinstate a bicameral system in Congress.

In his address, Vizcarra emphasized the need to strengthen state institutions to combat criminal organizations and corruption. He called for broad public participation, stating that a referendum would reinforce democratic processes. His initiative garnered support from several organizations, including Transparency International, which noted that Vizcarra’s commitment to reform was a rare and valuable opportunity for Peru. Similarly, The Washington Post highlighted that his firm response to a corruption scandal involving the judiciary had generated optimism about restoring integrity in public life.

Political reactions varied. Leftist lawmaker Marisa Glave, previously critical of Vizcarra, praised the proposal, acknowledging its resonance with a populace disillusioned by corruption yet disengaged from politics. The initiative posed a challenge to the Fujimorist bloc in Congress, which initially resisted efforts to implement judicial and legislative reforms, causing delays.

Faced with opposition from Congress, Vizcarra threatened to invoke a constitutional provision allowing the president to dissolve the legislature if it denied a second vote of confidence. The first denial had occurred during the administration of Vizcarra’s predecessor, Pedro Pablo Kuczynski. This ultimatum pressured Congress into initiating the referendum approval process.

=== Congressional approval ===
The first reform approved by Congress, led by the Fujimorist majority, was passed on 18 September 2018. This reform renamed the National Council of the Magistrature to the National Board of Justice. It also changed the process for appointing its members, who would now be selected by a special commission. This commission was to be chaired by the Attorney General and include the Comptroller General, the President of the Constitutional Tribunal, the President of the Judiciary, and the Ombudsman. Members would be chosen through a public merit-based selection process. The Board would also be required to submit an annual report on its activities to Congress.

On 26 September Congress approved the second reform. This amendment to Article 35 of the Constitution introduced new regulations for the financing of political parties. The changes included audits and control mechanisms to oversee donations, with a particular focus on limiting private funding for political campaigns. Sanctions were established for non-compliance with these regulations.

Following the arrest of opposition leader Keiko Fujimori on 10 October 2018, members of the American Popular Revolutionary Alliance and Popular Force proposed alternative modifications to Vizcarra's referendum. These alternatives were presented in Congress on October 11.

Later in October, the third proposal was approved. This reform imposed a term limit of one consecutive term for members of Congress, closely mirroring Vizcarra's original proposal. The fourth and final proposal, which reintroduced a bicameral legislature, called for the creation of a Congress with 130 deputies and 50 senators. However, Fujimorist legislators altered this proposal to reduce presidential powers and circumvent the ban on the re-election of parliamentarians. In response to these modifications, President Vizcarra withdrew his support for the reestablishment of a bicameral Congress.

=== Final questions ===
The final referendum questions were:

1. Do you approve the constitutional reform on the conformation and functions of the National Board of Justice, formerly the National Council of the Magistracy?
2. Do you approve the constitutional reform that regulates the financing of political organizations?
3. Do you approve the constitutional reform that prohibits the immediate re-election of parliamentarians of the Republic?
4. Do you approve the constitutional reform that establishes the bicamerality in the Congress of the Republic?

== Preliminary results ==
Voters ultimately accepted the first three referendum proposals, rejecting the final proposal of establishing a bicameral congress that President Vizcarra had withdrawn his support from after the Fujimorist-controlled congress amended the proposal.

Question	For		Against		Invalid/ blank	Total votes	Registered voters	Turnout	Result
Question	Votes	%	Votes	%	Invalid/ blank	Total votes	Registered voters	Turnout	Result
National Council of the Magistrature reform	13,697,835	86.57	2,125,359	13.43	1,730,038	17,553,232	24,187,276	72.57%	Approved
Political party financing reform	13,638,409	85.78	2,260,068	14.22	1,654,755	17,553,232	24,187,276	72.57%	Approved
One-term limits for Congress members	13,568,454	85.82	2,242,673	14.18	1,742,105	17,553,232	24,187,276	72.57%	Approved
Creating a bicameral Congress	1,457,871	9.48	13,918,972	90.52	2,176,389	17,553,232	24,187,276	72.57%	Rejected
Source: ONPE

== Reactions ==
Both President Vizcarra and political analysts acknowledged that the referendum marked only the initial step in addressing the entrenched corruption in Peru. Vizcarra emphasized the symbolic timing of the vote, which took place on International Anti-Corruption Day and the anniversary of the 1824 Battle of Ayacucho, a pivotal event in securing independence for Peru and much of South America.

Media outlets provided varied perspectives on the referendum’s outcome. Gestión described the results as a victory for Vizcarra while noting that the public had "harshly punished Congress." Similarly, The Economist observed that while Vizcarra was previously a relatively unknown figure, having served as governor of a small coastal region, his firm stance against corruption and a congress controlled by the Popular Force party, led by Keiko Fujimori, had allowed him to seize a critical political opportunity. Leaked recordings had revealed connections between the judiciary, organized crime, and members of Popular Force, prompting widespread public discontent. The referendum, according to The Economist, was only the beginning of a broader process of reform. It added that while restoring public trust in democracy would be a gradual process, the referendum signaled a potential turning point.
