= Presidency of Martín Vizcarra =

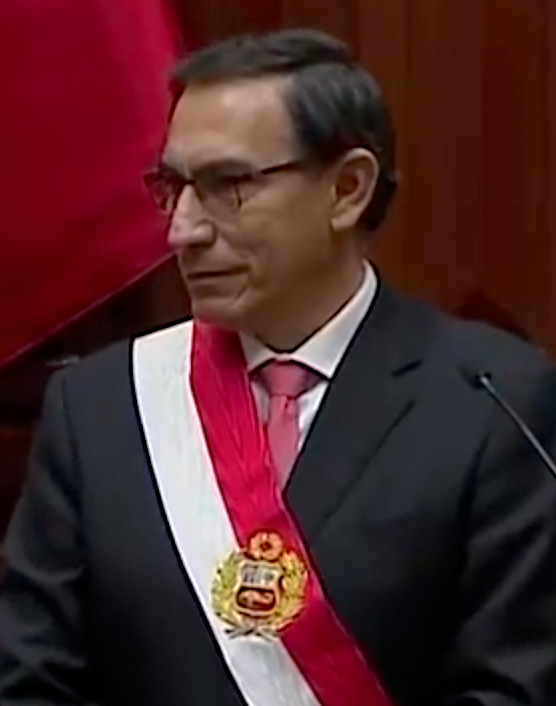
- Presidency of Martín Vizcarra; 23 March 2018 – 9 November 2020
- Vice President: Mercedes Aráoz (until 2020)
- Cabinet: see list
- Party: None
- Election: None
- Seat: Government Palace
- Standard of the President

Martín Vizcarra's tenure as the 60th president of Peru began with his inauguration on January 23, 2018, and ended on November 9, 2020. Vizcarra, an centrist to center-right politician born in Lima but closely related to and raised in Moquegua, took office following the resignation of former President Pedro Pablo Kuczynski, his running mate. Vizcarra entered office amid the ongoing political crisis, that started in 2016.

Vizcarra positioned himself as a reformer committed to fighting corruption and promoting transparency in government, including a series of judicial, political and electoral reforms to make Peruvian politics more transparent; however, the Fujimorist Congress quickly blocked his efforts, so led to the raising of motions of confidence by the Government to implement his reforms, since, according to the Constitution of Peru implemented in 1993 during the government of Alberto Fujimori, the president can dissolve the Congress if the Congress grants him twice the vote of no-confidence in his administration. Congress had already denied confidence to Kuczynski's administration on a previous occasion.

In social policy, recognizing Peruvian society as "machista", he promoted measures such as gender parity in government; but in immigration, he adopted a xenophobic position against Venezuelan immigration in Peru.

He also addressed the COVID-19 pandemic in Peru, dictating a nationwide confinement and issued relief funds. Despite these efforts, the pandemic brought to light underlying socio-economic inequalities. His presidency ended following his second impeachment and removal by Congress. His removal, considered widely to lack substantial evidence and to be politically motivated, triggered widespread protests.

The slogan of his government was “Peru first” (Spanish: El Perú primero).

== 2016 election ==
In the 2016 general election, Vizcarra ran with the Peruvians for Change presidential ticket as Pedro Pablo Kuczynski's running mate candidate for first vice president, narrowly defeating Keiko Fujimori's Popular Force ticket.

== Transition period and inauguration ==
Upon the resignation of President Pedro Pablo Kuczynski on 21 March 2018, Martín Vizcarra returned to Peru from Canada, where he had been serving as Peru's ambassador in Ottawa. Vizcarra assumed the presidency, expressing his response to the political crisis through a Twitter statement prior to his inauguration. In his message, Vizcarra acknowledged widespread public frustration with the country's situation and emphasized his commitment to collaborative efforts aimed at moving the nation forward.

=== Inauguration ===
Martín Vizcarra was inaugurated as President of Peru on March 23, 2018, the day following his 55th birthday, succeeding Pedro Pablo Kuczynski. The inauguration ceremony began at 13:04 PET, with Vizcarra taking the presidential oath of office. At 13:05 PET, the president of Congress, Luis Galarreta, officially bestowed upon him the presidential sash. Vizcarra delivered his inaugural address to the nation (Mensaje a la Nación) at 13:11 PET, in which he emphasized a commitment to improving education, strengthening national institutions, and addressing corruption. In reference to the country's corruption challenges, he declared, “we've had enough,” pledging to confront corruption “at any cost.”

== Reforms ==
=== Anti-corruption measures ===
==== 2018 Peruvian constitutional referendum ====
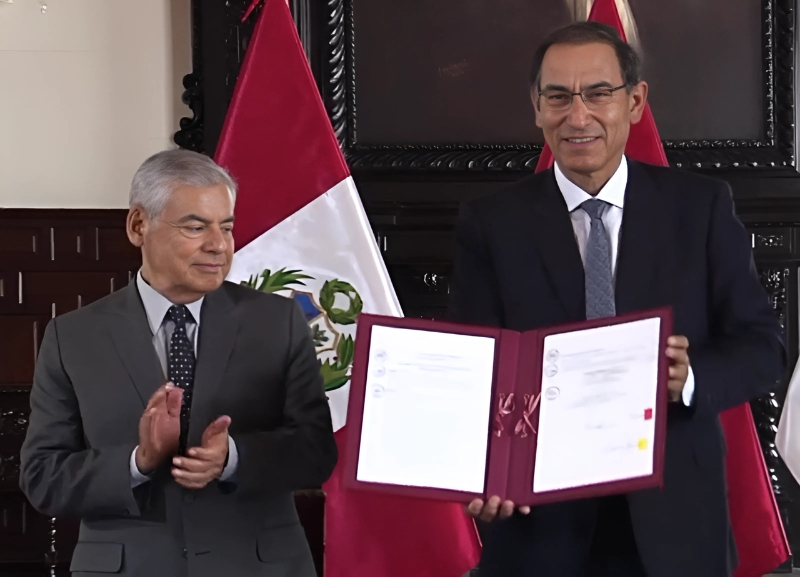
President Vizcarra enacts the Organic Law of the National Board of Justice on 19 February 2019. This reform changes the name of the National Council of the Magistracy to the National Board of Justice.

Following multiple corruption scandals facing the Peruvian government, on July 28, 2018, during his Annual Message to the Nation, President Martín Vizcarra proposed a national referendum to approve four constitutional amendments aimed at addressing corruption in Peru. These reforms sought to: (1) restructure the National Council of the Magistracy, the body responsible for appointing judges and prosecutors, (2) prohibit private funding for political campaigns, (3) ban the reelection of parliamentarians, and (4) reinstate a bicameral system in Congress.

In his address, Vizcarra emphasized the need to strengthen state institutions to combat criminal organizations and corruption. He called for broad public participation, stating that a referendum would reinforce democratic processes. His initiative garnered support from several organizations, including Transparency International, which noted that Vizcarra's commitment to reform was a rare and valuable opportunity for Peru. Similarly, The Washington Post highlighted that his firm response to a corruption scandal involving the judiciary had generated optimism about restoring integrity in public life.

Political reactions varied. Leftist lawmaker Marisa Glave, previously critical of Vizcarra, praised the proposal, acknowledging its resonance with a populace disillusioned by corruption yet disengaged from politics. The initiative posed a challenge to the Fujimorist bloc in Congress, which initially resisted efforts to implement judicial and legislative reforms, causing delays.

Faced with opposition from Congress, Vizcarra threatened to invoke a constitutional provision allowing the president to dissolve the legislature if it denied a second vote of confidence. The first denial had occurred during the administration of Vizcarra's predecessor, Pedro Pablo Kuczynski. This ultimatum pressured Congress into initiating the referendum approval process. On 9 December 2018, Peruvians ultimately accepted three of four of the proposals in the referendum, only rejecting the final proposal of creating a bicameral congress when Vizcarra withdrew his support when the Fujimorista-led congress manipulated the proposal content which would have removed power from the presidency.

==== Proposal to advance Peru's general elections ====
President Martín Vizcarra faced significant opposition in Congress as he sought to advance anti-corruption reforms, which included stricter campaign finance regulations and the removal of parliamentary immunity from prosecution. Encountering resistance, Vizcarra proposed early presidential and legislative elections during his Annual Message on July 28, 2019, suggesting a constitutional reform to conclude both congressional and presidential terms by July 28, 2020. He announced that this proposal would be submitted to Congress and, if approved, put to a public referendum. The proposal was met with strong opposition from members of the Fujimorist Popular Force and Aprista factions in Congress. These lawmakers argued that advancing elections would lead to further political instability, with opposition leader Pedro Olaechea stating that Congress should fulfill its full five-year term to uphold legislative authority. Meanwhile, Minister of Justice Vicente Zeballos indicated that the executive branch was prepared to seek a vote of confidence from Congress to secure approval for the early elections proposal if necessary.

On September 26, 2019, the Congressional Constitution and Rules Committee ultimately rejected the bill, declaring it unconstitutional and effectively ending the legislative push to advance the general elections.

==== Dissolution of Congress ====
In Peru, the 1993 Constitution allows the executive branch to dissolve Congress if two votes of no confidence are issued. Under President Pedro Pablo Kuczynski, Congress made its first no-confidence vote on September 14, 2017, resulting in the collapse of the Cabinet. On May 29, 2019, President Martín Vizcarra invoked this constitutional mechanism, announcing he would call for a second vote of no confidence if Congress failed to support his anti-corruption reforms.

For the following months, Congress postponed discussions on Vizcarra's proposed reforms and his call for early elections. By September 27, 2019, in a Message to the Nation, citing a threat to democratic governance, Vizcarra issued a matter of confidence on the election process of the Constitutional Court magistrates, criticizing Congress for advancing nominations without sufficient vetting while obstructing proposed election reforms. (Note: On that day, President Vizcarra referenced a report in the weekly Hildebrandt en sus trece. In an interview published that day, journalist César Hildebrandt spoke with Constitutional Court magistrate Marianella Ledesma Narváez. Ledesma disclosed that a fellow magistrate had suggested she could secure her position on the Court by voting in favor of the release of Keiko Fujimori. This comment was made as the Court considered a habeas corpus petition filed by Fujimori’s sister, Sachi Fujimori, seeking Keiko Fujimori’s release.) This matter of confidence sought that Congress suspend the election of magistrates, approve the proposed modifications, and apply them to the selection process. Vizcarra saw congressional approval of his proposals as a test of their confidence in his administration.

On September 30, 2019, Congress moved forward with a new Constitutional Court appointment, effectively ignoring Vizcarra's reform proposal. Viewing this as a second vote of no confidence, Vizcarra announced the dissolution of Congress, stating, “Peruvian people, we have done all we could.” He then called for new parliamentary elections.

In response, Congress attempted to declare Vizcarra suspended from office and appointed Vice President Mercedes Aráoz as interim president. However, the Peruvian government deemed these actions void, as Congress had been officially dissolved. That evening, citizens gathered outside the Legislative Palace, protesting Congress's actions, while leaders of Peru's armed forces confirmed their recognition of Vizcarra as president. This reaffirmation of power was widely supported by Peru's institutions, and polls showed Vizcarra retained popular support.

Following these events, the media in Peru began a fearmongering campaign, arguing that left-wing political candidates would be elected in the parliamentary elections and attempt to draft a new constitution.

==== 2020 Peruvian parliamentary election ====
In January 2020, the Constitutional Court of Peru upheld President Vizcarra's decision to dissolve Congress, with a narrow ruling of four judges in favor and three against. A legislative election was subsequently held on January 26, 2020, to form a new Congress. This election resulted in the replacement of the previous Fujimorist majority with a range of centrist parties. However, analysts Diego Pereira and Lucila Barbeito of JPMorgan Chase & Co. noted that the new Congress could be "even more antagonistic to the [Vizcarra] government than the previous one."

According to Americas Quarterly, the four primary right-leaning parties in Congress—Alliance for Progress, Podemos Perú, Popular Action, and Union for Peru—expressed concerns over Vizcarra's anti-corruption policies. These policies included stricter regulations on campaign financing, improved political transparency, and restrictions on the participation of individuals with criminal convictions in government roles.

== Domestic affairs ==
=== Climate change and the environment ===
We must be responsible to leave a legacy to our children and the future generations of Peru.

— Martín Vizcarra, 17 April 2018

On 17 April 2018, President Vizcarra signed the Law for Climate Change, allowing for more funding toward the Ministry of the Environment (MINAM) to monitor and combat climate change by analyzing greenhouse gas emissions while also creating a framework of inter-ministerial cooperation regarding the climate.

The signing made Peru the first country in South America to have a climate law, with Vizcarra stating that climate change could no longer be ignored and that the Government of Peru had an obligation to work together to provide a better environment for future Peruvians.

=== Measures to combat violence against women ===
President Martín Vizcarra's administration prioritized urgent measures to address escalating violence against women in Peru, an issue highlighted by several high-profile cases that provoked widespread concern. One such case was that of Eyvi Ágreda Marchena, a 22-year-old woman who became a victim of gender-based violence in Lima. On April 24, 2018, Ágreda was attacked on a public bus by an individual who doused her with gasoline and set her on fire. Despite multiple surgeries, she succumbed to her injuries on June 1, 2018. Her case ignited public outcry, leading to nationwide protests under the slogans “Women for Justice” and Ni Una Menos (Not One Less) on August 11, 2018. The perpetrator, Carlos Hualpa, was arrested and later sentenced to 35 years in prison for aggravated femicide.

In response to the surge in femicides and attacks on women, President Vizcarra's government implemented several key initiatives:

1. Emergency Commission: The government established a commission, led by the Prime Minister and composed of ministers from relevant sectors, to oversee actions against gender-based violence.
2. Police Station Alerts: All police stations across the country were placed on permanent alert to better respond to incidents of violence.
3. Multisectoral Coordination: The administration emphasized coordinated efforts across various sectors to address violence against women comprehensively.
4. “Men for Equality” Program: This program was introduced to promote gender equality and to address cultural factors contributing to violence.

Additionally, President Vizcarra requested legislative authority from Congress to enact further measures to combat violence against women, including laws targeting harassment in both public and private spaces.

=== COVID-19 pandemic ===
The administration of President Martín Vizcarra responded promptly to the COVID-19 pandemic, implementing containment measures shortly after Peru's first confirmed case. Analysts noted that the severe impact of COVID-19 in Peru was partially attributed to socioeconomic conditions. Approximately one-third of Peruvians live in overcrowded housing, and 72% work informally, making daily income essential. Limited access to food storage contributed to the challenge; only 49% of households own refrigerators or freezers, a figure that rises to 61% in urban areas, necessitating frequent market visits. Banks also faced overcrowding, as unbanked citizens were required to collect government stimulus payments in person.

On March 15, 2020, a nationwide lockdown was enforced, with only essential services such as pharmacies, food vendors, banks, and healthcare facilities permitted to operate. This crisis exposed significant limitations in Peru's economic model in securing health, food, and social protections for its population. Public hospitals quickly became overwhelmed, and many patients turned to private clinics, which demanded advance payments ranging from S/25,000 to S/70,000 for treatment. Under the constitutional framework established in 1993, which prioritizes "entrepreneurial and market freedoms," the government had limited authority to regulate private healthcare. Eventually, the State assumed financial responsibility for patient care after reaching an agreement with private providers, but only after Vizcarra threatened nationalization as a measure for national security.

The pandemic also highlighted issues within the oxygen supply system. Prices of oxygen cylinders rose sharply as demand increased, reflecting limited state control over market pricing. To address the crisis, the government financed university-led initiatives to produce affordable oxygen. However, state intervention was restricted by the 1993 Constitution, which limits public sector involvement in areas where private enterprises are active. A longstanding policy requiring oxygen production at concentrations above international standards—benefiting private producers—further strained supply and was repealed only amid critical shortages.

Peru's private health sector faced criticism for a lack of regulation, as private companies held significant control over insurance, health services, and medical supplies, often with minimal price oversight. Peru's gross domestic product fell 30.2 percent in the second quarter of 2020 as a result of economic lockdown measures, the largest decline of all major economies, with many small service businesses that represent the majority of businesses of Peru's economy going bankrupt during the crisis. Employment also dropped 40 percent compared to the previous rate while the Peruvian government approved 128 billion PEN (US$35.8 billion) of tax relief and low-rate business loans to deter further economic decline. The challenges posed by the pandemic underscored both the strengths and vulnerabilities of Peru's market-oriented healthcare structure.

=== Reactiva Perú ===
To prevent economic collapse during the COVID-19 pandemic, the Peruvian government, under then-President Martín Vizcarra, launched the Programa de Garantías Reactiva Perú ("Reactiva Perú Guarantee Program") on April 6, 2020. This initiative aimed to sustain the chain of payments by providing financial guarantees to businesses of all sizes—micro, small, medium, and large—enabling them to secure working capital loans to meet immediate obligations, such as payroll and payments to suppliers.

However, allocation of the Reactiva Perú funds favored larger corporations, which absorbed 71% of the program's capital. Micro and small enterprises received 23%, while medium-sized businesses accounted for 4%. The transfer of funds was facilitated by private banks, as Banco de la Nación—Peru's sole public bank—is restricted to serving government employees and retirees. Consequently, private banks primarily channeled the loans, with some reportedly transferring funds to their parent companies or affiliated entities within their corporate groups, raising questions about the equitable distribution of resources intended to stabilize the broader economy.

== Foreign affairs ==
=== Adoption of the Global Compact for Migration ===
In December 2018, Peru, along with 155 other nations, adopted the Global Compact for Safe, Orderly and Regular Migration at the United Nations Intergovernmental Conference in Marrakesh, Morocco. Negotiated over a period of eighteen months, the compact represents an international agreement aimed at enhancing cooperation and establishing a coordinated framework for addressing global migration issues. Its objectives include promoting safe migration practices, ensuring orderly migration flows, and improving the regulation of migration at international levels.

=== Position of the Lima Group on Venezuela ===
On January 4, 2019, the foreign ministers of the Lima Group, which includes 12 Latin American countries and Canada, convened in Lima to address the political situation in Venezuela. The group urged Venezuelan President Nicolás Maduro to forgo inauguration for a second term, recommending instead that power be transferred to the Venezuelan National Assembly until new elections could be held as a measure to restore democratic order. The declaration was endorsed by 13 member nations, with Mexico abstaining.

Upon Maduro's inauguration, Peruvian foreign minister Néstor Popolizio announced several measures against the Maduro administration, including a ban on entry into Peru for Maduro, his family, and associates. Maduro responded by disparaging both the decision and President Vizcarra of Peru, whom he referenced dismissively. President Vizcarra, when questioned, labeled Maduro's government as “illegitimate and dictatorial.”

On February 4, 2019, the Lima Group met again in Canada, where 11 of its 14 members issued a joint statement supporting Juan Guaidó, president of the Venezuelan National Assembly, as interim leader of Venezuela. They called for a peaceful transition without military intervention, encouraging Venezuelan military forces to withdraw support from Maduro. In alignment with this stance, Peru formally recognized Carlos Scull, Guaidó's appointed representative, as Venezuela's ambassador to Peru.

Peru's deputy foreign minister, Hugo de Zela, attended a subsequent Lima Group summit in Bogotá on February 25, 2019, to further discuss joint measures in response to the Venezuelan presidential crisis. At the summit, de Zela reaffirmed Peru's commitment to a peaceful resolution and declared that Venezuelan diplomats appointed by Maduro would no longer be recognized in Lima, giving them 15 days from February 22 to depart the country.

=== President Vizcarra's official visits abroad ===
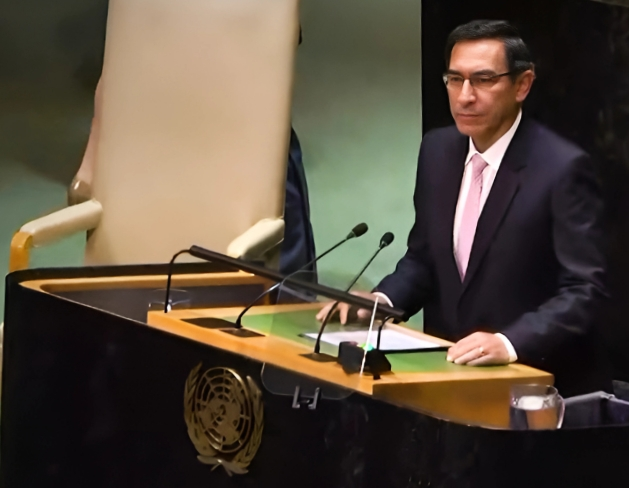
Vizcarra at the 74th United Nations General Assembly on September 24, 2019

On July 23, 2018, President Martín Vizcarra made his first official trip abroad as head of state, attending the XIII Presidential Summit of the Pacific Alliance in Mexico. During the event, which concluded on July 25, Vizcarra assumed the pro tempore presidency of the Pacific Alliance for the 2018–2019 period. In September 2018, Vizcarra continued diplomatic efforts with a visit to Cobija, Bolivia, for the IV Peru-Bolivia Binational Cabinet. There, he met with Bolivian President Evo Morales to discuss shared concerns, including environmental management of Lake Titicaca, border security, and a proposed bioceanic railway project.

On September 23, Vizcarra traveled to New York for the 73rd session of the United Nations General Assembly, delivering a speech on September 25 highlighting Peru's efforts toward democratic stability. His participation included bilateral meetings with various leaders and other official engagements. From October 25 to 26, 2018, Vizcarra conducted a state visit to Ecuador, where he and Ecuadorian President Lenín Moreno presided over the XII Peru-Ecuador Binational Cabinet, attended by both countries’ ministers. This event coincided with the 20th anniversary of the peace accord between Ecuador and Peru.

Vizcarra's international commitments continued with a visit to Chile on November 27, where he met with Chilean President Sebastián Piñera and participated in the II Peru-Chile Binational Cabinet. He returned to Mexico on December 1 to attend the inauguration of President Andrés Manuel López Obrador. Vizcarra's visit to Brazil on December 31 for the inauguration of President Jair Bolsonaro was cut short due to developments in Peru's Lava Jato investigations. In February 2019, Vizcarra undertook a tour of Portugal and Spain, concluding early on March 1 in response to criticism over domestic emergency conditions related to rain and floods. In Spain, Vizcarra signed seven cooperation agreements with Spanish officials.

On March 21, 2019, Vizcarra attended the Meeting of Presidents of South America in Santiago, Chile, to support the establishment of Prosur, a regional integration initiative intended to replace the Union of South American Nations (Unasur). The leaders in attendance, including Argentina's Mauricio Macri, Colombia's Iván Duque, and Brazil's Jair Bolsonaro, endorsed the Declaration on the Renewal and Strengthening of South American Integration.

On June 30, Vizcarra attended an official dinner hosted by Panamanian President Juan Carlos Varela in Panama City, followed by the inauguration of President Laurentino Cortizo the next day. Subsequently, on September 6, 2019, Vizcarra participated in the Presidential Summit for the Amazon in Leticia, Colombia, along with leaders from Colombia, Ecuador, Bolivia, Brazil, Guyana, and Suriname. The summit concluded with the signing of the Leticia Pact, committing these nations to cooperative measures to protect the Amazon rainforest.

Finally, on September 24, 2019, Vizcarra addressed the 74th United Nations General Assembly, outlining his administration's proposal to advance elections as a measure to reinforce constitutional governance. He emphasized Peru's commitment to anti-corruption reforms and called for a global initiative to combat corruption

=== Visits of heads of state to Peru ===
On October 2, 2018, President Vizcarra received at the Government Palace the emir of Qatar, Tamim bin Hamad Al Thani, on an official visit. On October 14, 2018, Bolivian president Evo Morales visited the Ilo Port Terminal to participate in the arrival of a ship from China with goods for Bolivia. This, after the adverse ruling for Bolivia in its maritime lawsuit against Chile in the court of The Hague, and in the framework of his policy to accelerate alternative projects for its overseas trade, highly dependent on the ports of northern Chile.

Between November 12 and 14, 2018, King Felipe VI and Queen Letizia of Spain paid a state visit to Peru, participating in various official activities, including a meeting with President Vizcarra at the Government Palace. Between June 25 and 26, 2019, the V Peru-Bolivia Binational Cabinet was held in the city of Ilo, which was attended by Bolivian president Evo Morales. Among the thematic axes of this meeting are energy cooperation (import of Bolivian gas) and trade exchange through Ilo.

On July 25, 2019, President Vizcarra received at the Government Palace the governor general of Canada, Julie Payette, who was visiting for the inauguration of the 18th Pan American Games Lima 2019. On August 27, 2019, President Vizcarra met with Colombian president Iván Duque in the city of Pucallpa, as a prelude to the V Peru-Colombia Binational Cabinet. The thematic axes of this meeting were social affairs and governance; environmental and mining-energy issues; trade, economic development and tourism; security and defense; border and migration issues. A commitment was made to protect and develop the Amazon and a summit of heads of states of Amazonian countries was announced to be held in Leticia (Colombia), to coordinate a policy to protect the Amazon from forest fires.

On October 10, 2019, President Martín Vizcarra met with Chilean president Sebastián Piñera, before the start of the III Peru-Chile Binational Cabinet, which was held in the resort of Paracas. In that meeting, the commitment of both countries to continue working in a complementary manner was ratified and support was given to the government of Lenín Moreno in Ecuador, affected by a serious internal crisis. On November 7, 2019, Vizcarra met with his counterpart Lenín Moreno in Tumbes to participate in the Presidential Meeting and the XIII Binational Cabinet Peru Ecuador.

== Notes ==
Political offices
Preceded by Presidency of Pedro Pablo Kuczynski	President of Peru; 28 March 2018 – 9 November 2020	Succeeded by Presidency of Manuel Merino
