= 2025 Peruvian protests =

2025 Gen Z protests in Peru

- Part of Gen Z protests and Peruvian political crisis (2016–present)
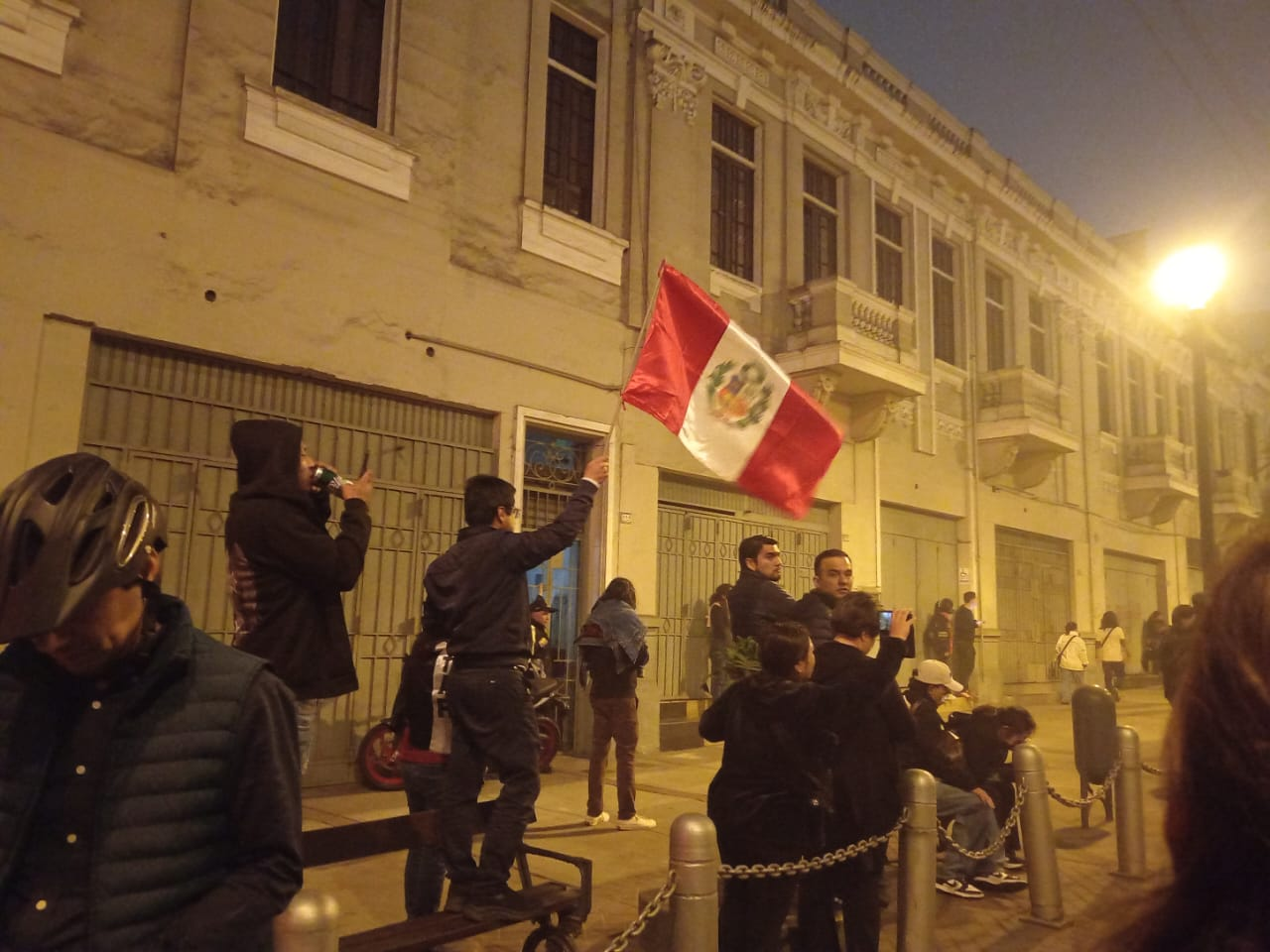
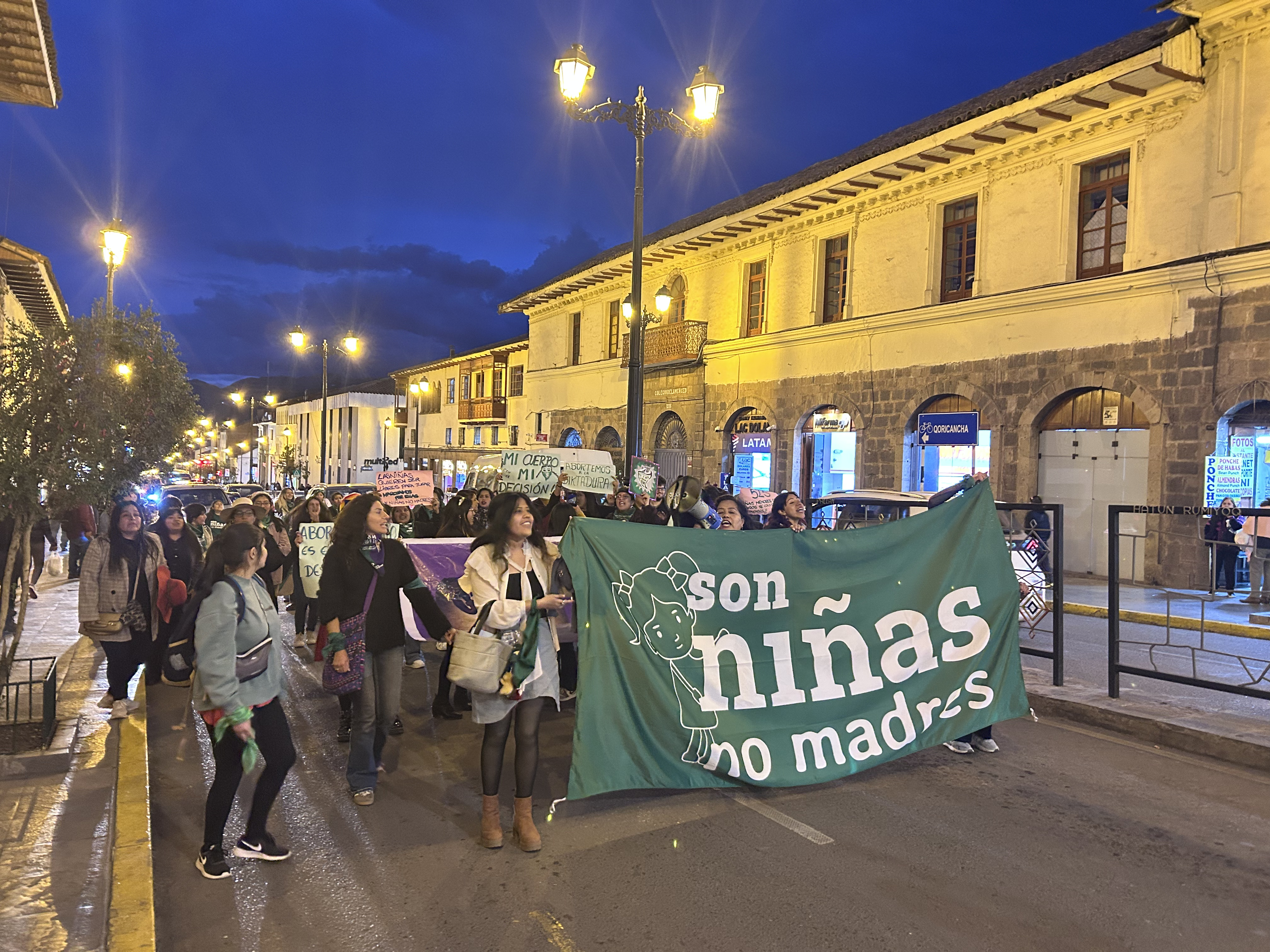
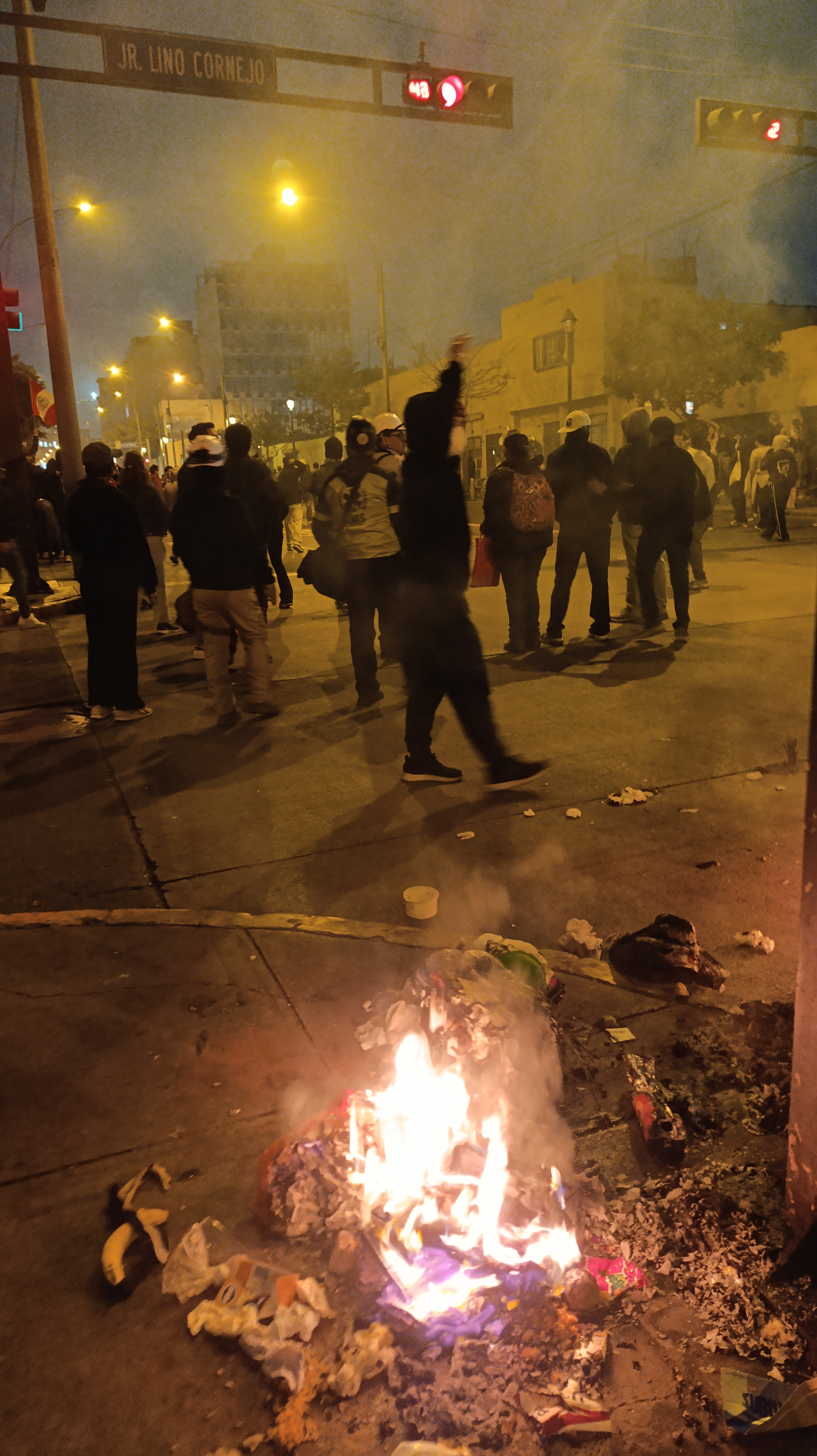
- Protesters raising the Peruvian flag Women protesting, 28 September 15 October clashes
- Date: 13 September 2025 – 16 October 2025 (1 month and 3 days)
- Location: Peru
- Caused by: Ongoing political crisis since 2016; Rise in crime and worsening security crisis; Corruption and highest global unpopularity under both President Dina Boluarte's administration and Congress; Protests in 2022 and 2023; Pension reform
- Goals: Repeal of the pension reform; Removal of President Dina Boluarte; Removal of President José Jerí; Dissolution of Congress of Peru
- Result: Concluded: Impeachment of Dina Boluarte; President Jerí rejects his presidential resignation.; Congress rejects motion of dissolution; 30 day emergency declared since 10th October; Eventual impeachment of José Jeri in February 2026

Parties
Protesters; Transportation guilds Deface Peru	Government of Dina Boluarte (until 10 October 2025); Government of José Jerí (since 10 October 2025); We Are Peru; Congress of Peru; National Police of Peru

Casualties and losses
1 killed; 24 injured; 17 arrested	89 police officers injured

On 20 September 2025, protests began in Peru against the administration of Dina Boluarte and the subsequent administration of José Jerí, following the impeachment of Dina Boluarte and the Congress of Peru. Protests against President Jerí grew following allegations of sexual assault against him. This series of demonstrations followed the previous protests that occurred in 2022 and 2023 against the removal of her predecessor, Pedro Castillo.

At least 19 protestors were injured in marches held in Lima on 27 and 28 September according to the National Human Rights Coordinator (CNDDHH). Further protests on 15 October resulted with over 80 injured and one protester killed with multiple gunshot wounds. During clashes, protesters have been observed throwing stones and other objects, and police were seen dispersing crowds with tear gas and rubber bullets.

== Origin ==
Peru has experienced a consistent political crisis since 2016, with citizens growing angered by increased corruption and crime in Peru. President Dina Boluarte had one of the lowest approval ratings of any leader in the world. She grew highly unpopular following the crackdown on protests in 2022 and 2023. The Congress of Peru was equally unpopular, having an disapproval rating over 90%.

Social unrest increased after the Boluarte government passed a law on 5 September that required all Peruvians above the age of 18 to join a pension provider, despite job insecurity and an unofficial employment rate of over 70 percent. Sociology professor Omar Coronel of the university of Pontifical Catholic University of Peru said that following the pension conflict, young citizens expanded their protests against corruption and crime due to their disillusionment with the poor function of the state in Peru.

== Timeline ==
=== 13 September ===
Some smaller marches began in Lima's historic center. The U.S. Embassy issued a statement regarding the events.

=== 20 September ===
The first reports of massive protests occurred on 20 September 2025, caused by the government passing a pension reform. This has led to many demanding the removal of Dina Boluarte.

=== 21 September ===
At least three officers were wounded as a result of the 500 people gathering towards the City Centre. Chaos still continues.

=== 22 September ===
Eighteen protesters were injured following clashes with the law enforcement. Around 450 protesters joined the protests, damaging public streets. Around six journalists from the National Association of Journalists of Peru were injured from pellets fired by police. Boluarte's term was set to end in July 2026.

=== 23 September ===
A Hudbay mineral mill located in Peru temporarily shuts-down due to protests; blocking Copper routes and transportation.

=== 28 September ===
Protesters were reported to have gathered in Plaza San Martín, where various groups and transporters gathered, while another meeting point was Parque Universitario.

It was reported that the police had opened disciplinary proceedings against the officer who assaulted an elderly man during the marches the day before, as well as the release of those detained.

Cardinal Carlos Castillo Mattasoglio spoke out in favor of the protesters, declaring that "there are no terrorists here, there are people with dignity." For its part, the Superintendency of Banking and Insurance (SBS) published the regulations for the eighth withdrawal of contributions to the AFPs.

At the same time, the Deface Peru collective attacked the website of the newspaper El Peruano, vandalized the Wikipedia pages of various politicians and leaked the identifications of police officers assigned to the marches, leaving messages of support for the protesters at said events.

=== 30 September ===
Fishermen's strike begins after squid price increases. More than 90,000 people have stopped fishing in Lambayeque and Piura.

=== 2 October ===
The Peruvian National Police arrested seventeen people during a march against insecurity in Lima, including a minor.

=== 10 October ===
A vote is held to decide whether to remove Dina Boularte. The vote surpasses the required threshold of 87 votes in favor. Boluarte is hence removed from office by the Congress of Peru under Article 113 of the Constitution of Peru. José Jerí is later elected and sworn in as the new President of Peru.

=== 15 October ===
Protests were organized throughout Peru. In Lima, thousands participated in demonstrations and protesters chanted "The rapist is Jerí" and "Jerí is a violin", with "violin" being Peruvian slang for a rapist. Clashes began to occur in downtown Lima, with the Commanding General of the Peruvian National Police, Oscar Manuel Arriola Delgado, stating "We are going to act using force. ... They are looking for an Inti and Bryan", reportedly insinuating that protesters were looking for martyrs through deaths similar to the deaths of Brian Pintado and Inti Sotelo during the 2020 Peruvian protests. The clashes resulted in one protester killed and over 80 injured after police fire pellets at demonstrators. Minister of the Interior Vicente Tiburcio reportedly minimized the death of the protester, 32-year old rapper Eduardo Mauricio Ruiz Sanz, saying "For me, there's definitely no political cost because we've first and foremost planned everything so that this can unfold peacefully from start to finish, strictly respecting the human rights of every citizen." Following the killing, groups announced protests at Plaza San Martin for the next day at 3:00pm.

=== 16 October ===
President Jerí refused to resign, stating "My responsibility is to maintain the stability of the country." According to La República, interior minister Tiburcio falsely stated that no undercover officers of the "Terna" group were present at protests despite videos of alleged plainclothes officers being observed. The individual who reportedly killied Ruiz is identified as a member of the national police. Peruvian prime minister Ernesto Álvarez Miranda, an ultraconservative judge popular on social media who described the protesters as being subversives days earlier on 10 October, announced that the government would declare a state of emergency.

== Protest violence ==
Various media outlets reported that authorities used excessive forces against the press and protesters, with reports of journalists being attacked with clubs, rubber bullets and tear gas.

The first protester killed during the demonstrations was Eduardo Mauricio Ruiz Sanz, who was shot and killed. It was reported that he was shot by an undercover police officer who began to fire his gun at individuals near him while fleeing after being discovered.

Some small groups of protesters were observed to be violent, with one individual seen throwing a Molotov cocktail at authorities and others firing fireworks during clashes on 15 October.

== See also ==
- List of protests in the 21st century
