= DIRIN Leaks =

2025 data breach in Peru

The DIRIN Leaks was a data breach of the Directorate of Intelligence (DIRIN) of the National Police of Peru (PNP) that took place on September 4, 2025.

A hacker going by the alias InkaRoot, along with another hacker going by SadClow, leaked the data on the Telegram channel of a collective known as Deface Peru, of which they were both members. InkaRoot, who identifies himself as a right wing nationalist, uses a photo of Vladimiro Montesinos, advisor to former president Alberto Fujimori, as his profile picture. InkaRoot claims this was Hacktivism in response to the normalization of corruption, elite indifference, and deaths in recent demonstrations.

The data included information about leaders of social movements, personal information of police officers, details of plans regarding the protection of current and former Presidents of Peru, and counterintelligence documents linked to the harassment of journalists and judges.

The hackers included a statement in Spanish, translated,

We are SadClow and InkaRoot. For years we have seen how companies, governments and organizations boast “unhackable” systems. Today, we have shown it: no digital fortress is impenetrable.

Within minutes we accessed a system that was considered maximum security. Millions invested, contracts signed, audits approved... and yet, a single line of code was enough to open the door.

We didn't infect with ransomware, although we were able to. Our goal is not to destroy, but to demonstrate: the false sense of security is the greatest enemy.

If a couple of individuals with time and knowledge achieved this, imagine what those who do seek to harm would do. Invest better, train better, protect better. Because next time, maybe it's not SadClow and InkaRoot.

- SadClow and InkaRoot

Deface Peru 2025

In the initial response to the leak, Victor Zanabria, general commander of the PNP, denied that there had been a hack to the DIRIN and asserted that, it was an internal leak and announced that an internal audit was going to be carried out to determine who those involved were.
