= César Hinostroza =

Peruvian judge, lawyer and fugitive

The Honorable César Hinostroza
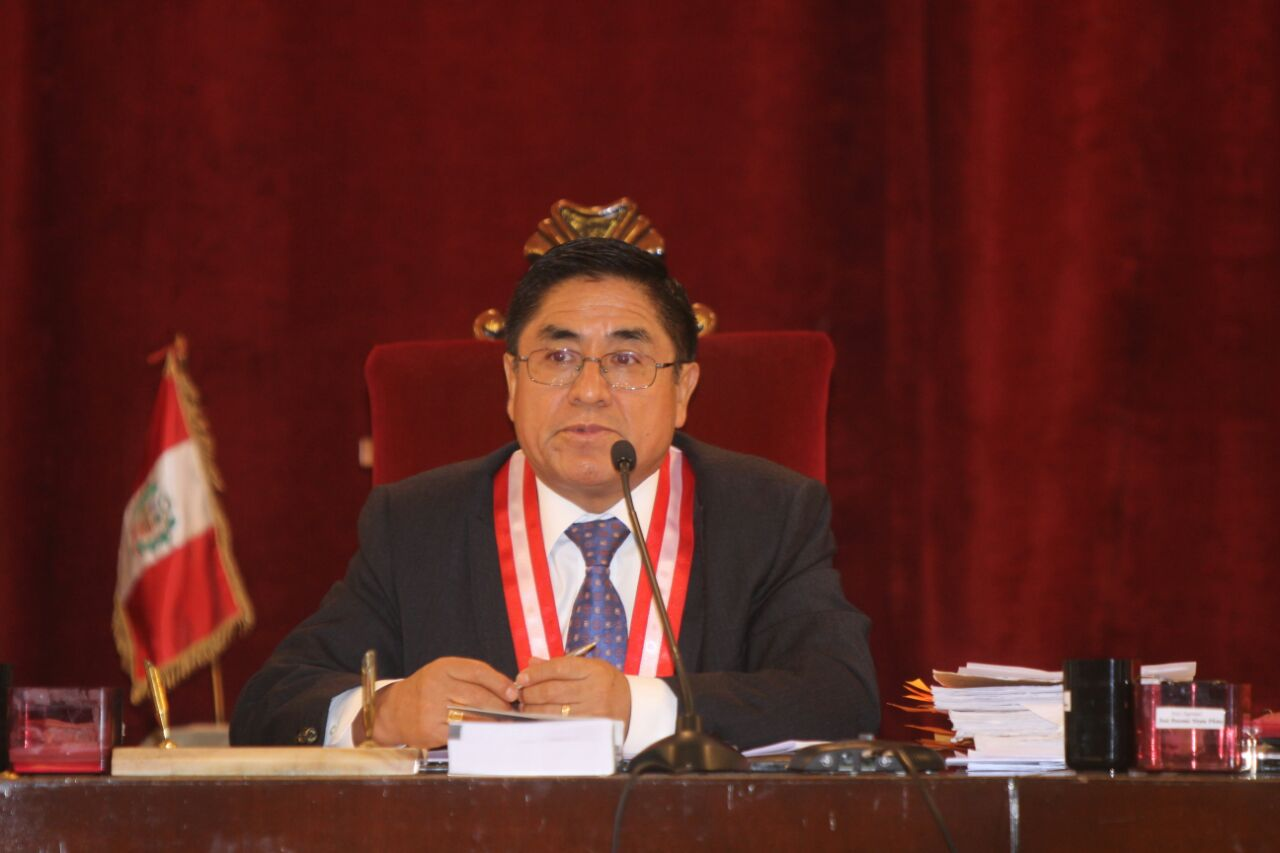

Associate Justice of the Supreme Court of Peru
- In office 2 January 2017 – 11 July 2018

Personal details
- Born: 28 September 1956 (age 70) Jauja, Peru
- Party: Independent
- Spouse: Gloria Gutiérrez Chapa
- Education: San Marcos University
- Known for: His involvement in the CNM Audios controversy

César Hinostroza (born September 11, 1956 ) is a Peruvian judge, lawyer, and fugitive who was a judge in the Peruvian Supreme Court from 2 January 2017 until his escape on July 11, 2018, in the midst of the political crisis in Peru. He is known for being involved in the CNM Audios scandal, a corruption scandal which led to his escape. When he escaped on 17 October, he was arrested following a warrant by Interpol, but was provisionally released on April 11, 2019.

== Biography ==
In 1979 he received a law degree from the Universidad Nacional Mayor de San Marcos. Master in Criminal Sciences and Constitutional Law from the University of San Martín de Porres (2003). Doctor of Laws from the University of San Martín de Porres and a master's degree in Justice Administration from alas Peruanas University.

His professional career began as a defense attorney, advisor and consult with his own firm (1980–1981). Deputy Provincial Prosecutor of the Public Prosecutor 's Office (1982-1983), Judge of Peace Lawyer of Lima (1983–1985), Judge Instructor Titular de Talara-Piura (1985-1991).

He served as Chief Judge of Loreto (1991–1999), National Supreme Anti-Drug Judge of Peru (2000), Chief Judge of Callao, President of the 4 Criminal Chambers of the Superior Court of Justice of Callao.

He was President of the Superior Court of Justice of Callao (2009-2010), 5 Provisional Supreme Judge of the Constitutional and Social Chamber of the Supreme Court of Peru (2011), Member of the District Executive Council of the Superior Court of Callao (2011-2012), President of the Second Criminal Chamber of In prison of the Superior Court of Justice of Callao (2012-2014).

Director of the School of Judges and Judicial Auxiliaries of the Superior Court of Justice of Callao (2013-2014), Chairman of the Criminal Law and Criminal Procedural Training Commission of the Superior Court of Justice of Callao, Chairman of the District Jurisdictional Plenary Commission of the Constitutional Specialty of the Superior Court of Justice of Callao

During his management in June 2015 he created the Observatory of Regional Crime that serves as a source of information for adopting crime prevention actions.

In December 2015 he was elected Supreme Titular Judge of the Supreme Court of Justice, following a call process that lasted almost nine months.

Hinostroza was re-elected as President (2015-2016), Member of the Permanent Criminal Chamber of the Supreme Court of justice of the Republic and President of the Second Transitional Criminal Chamber of the Supreme Court of Justice of the Republic.

He launched actions to improve service to the population, such as the implementation of the digital signature for the notification of family processes, the creation of the Itinerant Pool of judicial assistants that has helped to decongest the procedural burden of the courts of various specialties, the inauguration of two Family Meeting Houses in the districts of Bellavista and La Perla, a juvenile resocialization center called the Offending Adolescent Orientation Service, the creation of flagrance courts, among others.

Together with the practice in the judicial career he is a professor of law at different universities including the Private University of Iquitos, the National University of the Amazon of Iquitos, the University of San Martín de Porres, Universidad Inca Garcilaso de La Vega, Federico Villarreal National University.

=== CNM Audios and controversies ===
On Saturday, July 7, 2018, the news portal IDL-Reporters broadcast a series of audios that involve officials of the National Council of the Judiciary and judges who could have committed influence and corruption trafficking. Among the names committed are in addition to Hinostroza the current president of the Superior Court of Callao, Walter Ríos and the councillors of the National Council of the Magistracy Iván Noguera, Guido Aguila and Julio Gutiérrez. In response, the CNM announces an investigation into the alleged irregularities of officials. In one of the Hinostroza audios he coordinates with the President of Corte de Lima Sur, Judge Marco Cerna - who resigned from his post on August 11 for the audios - to place magistrates in his judicial district.

On Sunday, July 8, new audios are broadcast revealing a conversation in which he seems to contemplate a reduction in sentence or even acquittal in a case of rape of a minor; while in another he coordinates with one former judge an apparent utilitarian meeting with the President of the Republic, Martín Vizcarra.

A day later, on July 9, the Ministry of Women and Vulnerable Populations demanded that Supreme Judge Hinostroza be "removed from office immediately in the face of the dissemination of an audio, in which she is heard negotiating what would be a conviction against a sexual rapist of a minor." The Minister of Defense ordered the Peruvian Navy to withdraw the "Peruvian Cross of Naval Merit" awarded to Hinostroza in 2010.

On July 24, in the Congressional Subcommittee on Constitutional Accusations, he declared from the constitutional denunciations filed by Congressmen Richard Arce (New Peru), Gloria Montenegro (APP), and Marco Arana (Broad Front) against Guido Eagle, former immigrant of the National Council of the Magistracy and César Hinostroza.

On 25 July, the Supreme Court of Justice withdrew the judge from the Permanent Constitutional and Social Law Chamber, and in which he will not be able to participate for the duration of the disciplinary proceedings that were opened against him in the National Council of the Magistracy.

On 18 October 2018, the Peruvian authorities confirmed that Hinostroza had violated an order issued three months ago (July 13) and had escaped from the country landing in Spain. Hours later, Interior Minister Mauro Medina resigned from whom President Martín Vizcarra accepted the resignation. César Villanueva, president of the Council of Ministers reported that Hinostroza had "illegally dated like any criminal" on October 7, evading immigration controls in northern Peru. He crossed into Ecuador through the city of Huaquillas and took in Guayaquil a flight to Amsterdam using an ordinary passport, since the Chancellery had annulled the diplomat both to him and his wife, information advanced by the newspaper El Comercio. The next day, 19 October, Spanish police arrested him in Madrid following a red alert issued by Interpol. He was released during an extradition deal on 11 April 2019.
