= Cuellos Blancos scandal =

Peruvian judicial scandal

The Cuellos Blancos del Puerto scandal (English: White Collars of the Port), frequently shortened to Cuellos Blancos scandal (English: White Collars scandal) or the CNM Audios scandal, is a judicial scandal caused by the revelation of audio recordings of judges and their staff, with the most notable individual being Associative Justice of the Supreme Court of Peru César Hinostroza, allegedly discussing bribes and reducing criminal penalties. These judges were part of the National Council of Magistracy (Peruvian Spanish: Consejo Nacional de la Magistratura, CNM). The scandal was revealed by an initiative led by the investigative journalism website IDL-Reporteros, which ultimately collected over 63,000 audio recordings that reportedly unveiled one of the largest corruption networks in Peru's judicial history. During the course of events, it was discovered that judges and prosecutors involved in handling the Odebrecht case in Peru were attempting to obstruct investigations into some defendants, including the leader of the Fujimorist political party Popular Force, Keiko Fujimori. Subsequently, Fujimorists in Congress provided protection to judges and prosecutors from being removed from their offices.

Following the scandal, the CNM would be restructured into the National Board of Justice (JNJ).

== Background ==
Following the release of the investigative material related to the Odebrecht case in the mid-2010s and the election of Fujimorists into 73 of 130 seats in the Congress of Peru in the 2016 Peruvian general election, Keiko Fujimori, who had lost the 2016 presidential election, allied with the political coalition Popular Alliance to target political opponents who may have been involved with Odebrecht. Pedro Pablo Kuczynski, who had narrowly defeated Fujimori in the election, was later implicated in the Odebrecht investigations, facing a failed impeachment vote in December 2017. President Kuczynski finally resigned in March 2018 following the Kenjivideos scandal, which showed Keiko's brother, Kenji Fujimori, allegedly assisting Kuczynski associates with buying votes against impeachment. The opening of investigations by Fujimorists ultimately backfired as they could not control all prosecutors as investigations broadened and Keiko Fujimori became implicated in the scandal as well.

== Release of recordings ==
The first series of audios were found on 7 July 2018, through IDL-Reporteros. The recordings revealed alleged offers of sentence reductions, requests and acknowledgments of favors or negotiations for promotions of officials.

The telephone hearings were authorized immediately in the investigation of the Las Castañuelas de Rich Port case in Callao. The request of the Callao organized crime prosecutor, Rocío Sánchez Saavedra, which was made on 22 December 2017, was admitted before the Callao preparatory investigation judge, Roque Huamacondor. The telephone hearings, in charge of the Constellation Group of the Police Anti-Drug Directorate, which was carried out to mafias linked to drug trafficking, extortion and hit men in Callao, an investigation was derived that implicated judges and lawyers called "Los Cuellos Blancos del Puerto".

== Investigations ==
=== Initial response ===
Due to the scandal over the recordings, on 9 July 2018, the Council of State was summoned. The National Council of the Magistracy (CNM) agreed to suspend indefinitely the evaluation processes of judges and prosecutors and its total recognition. The Executive Council of the Judiciary announced the declaration of emergency in the judicial district of Callao for 60 calendar days and, later, it was extended to 90 days to the entire national system of the Judicial Power. The Government announced the creation of a commission in charge of the "judicial reform". On 19 July 2018, the President of the Judiciary, Duberlí Rodríguez, resigned from office. Congress declared the CNM in emergency for nine months. On 31 July 2018, the Comptroller General of the Republic seized and sealed CNM documentation. The Lima Bar Association decided to suspend the tuition of Guido Águila, Julio Gutiérrez, Iván Noguera, César Hinostroza and Gianfranco Paredes Sánchez. The Supreme Court declared the Executive Council of the Judiciary in emergency for 10 days.

The recordings have caused the Public Prosecutor's Office Specialized in Crimes of Corruption of officials to denounce the officials involved in the recordings before the Public Ministry. On the part of the Public Ministry, a special team made up of the prosecutors Frank Almanza, Fany Quispe Farfán and Rocío Sánchez Saavedra. The Public Ministry reported the filing of a constitutional complaint against the supreme member César Hinostroza and the former CNM advisers Julio Gutiérrez, Guido Águila, Iván Noguera and Orlando Velásquez.

In the midst of the investigations, the National Council of the Magistracy refused to deliver the documentation required by the anti-corruption prosecutor Norah Córdova. For his part, the supreme prosecutor Víctor Raúl Rodríguez Monteza demanded the delivery of the recordings, warning IDL-Reporteros and Panorama that they could be denounced "for the crime of disobedience to the authority". Head of the Callao Court, Flor Guerrero, revealed the disappearance of documents in her institution.

=== Chávarry incident ===
The National Prosecutor, Pedro Chávarry, requested an investigation into "persons involved in the irregular disclosure". The recordings involve, in addition to judges, prosecutors, CNM advisers, businessmen, politicians and public officials. On July 13, 2018, Justice Minister Salvador Heresi resigned after a broadcast of a recording with conversations with Judge César Hinostroza. The Ethics Commission was then launched by Congress, initiating a preliminary investigation of Congressman Becerril and inquiries into Mauricio Mulder, Salvador Heresi and Villavicencio, implicated and mentioned in the audios.

On July 19, 2018, a recording was broadcast between Judge Hinostroza and the elected prosecutor of the Nation, Pedro Chávarry.

Investigations by the Public Prosecutor's Office would find a hierarchal structure in the judicial system; Supreme Court and National Council of Magistracy officials heading the network, staff of the Superior Court of Justice of Callao working under them and finally an external group of businessmen and litigating lawyers.

=== Ríos Montalvo allegations ===
The President of the Superior Court of Callao who was involved in the scandal, Walter Ríos Montalvo, would implicate multiple individuals with being involved in corruption.

According to Ríos Montalvo, the following individuals were involved in a certain number of corrupt acts:

- Associative Justice of the Supreme Court of Peru César Hinostroza, (18 acts)
- Business Mario Mendoza Díaz (7 acts)
- CNM advisers Guido Águila Grados and Orlando Velásquez Benítez (3 acts)
- CNM adviser Iván Noguera Ramos (2 acts)
- CNM adviser Julio Gutiérrez Pebe (1 act)

After giving his testimony and collaborating with investigators, Ríos Montalvo was described as the "key man" in the network and was sentenced to twelve years in prison for influence peddling and being involved in a criminal organization on 30 December 2021.

=== Benavides investigations ===
In July 2022, Attorney General Patricia Benavides would change the team of prosecutors investigating the scandal and by September 2022, her office reported that it had only reviewed about 15% of the more than 63,000 audio recordings. In January 2023, Benavides' office began a six month long restructuring process that halted audio transcription efforts, refusing to renew the contracts of many linguistic experts involved in the case. Despite Benavides promising that investigations would finalize in May 2023, no conclusion occurred.

By July 2023, OjoPúblico reported that most of the individuals implicated in the scandal were not charged and that such delay in the investigation "generates suspicion". Benavides would be investigated by the National Board of Justice (JNJ) for her alleged obstruction of the Cuellos Blancos investigation involving calls between her and individuals reportedly involved in the scandal, though she filed a lawsuit with the Constitutional Court of Peru and was legislatively defended by Fujimorists in the Congress of Peru.

== See also ==
- 2017–2021 Peruvian political crisis
- Operation Car Wash
- Supreme Court of Peru
- Corruption in Peru
- César Hinostroza
