= Patricia Benavides =

Peruvian lawyer (born 1969)

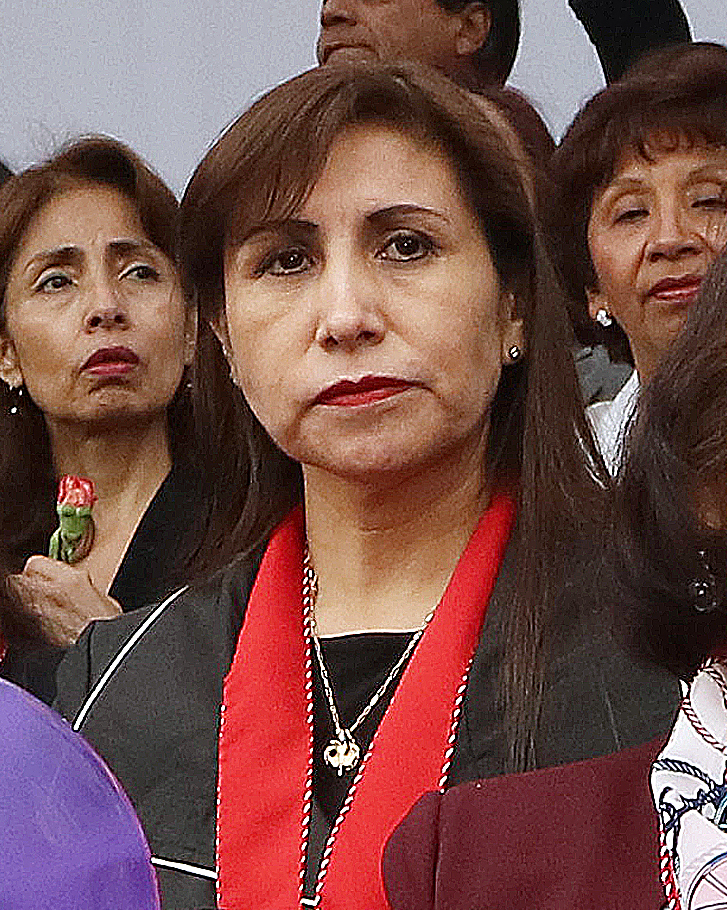

Attorney General of Peru
- In office 20 June 2022 – 7 December 2023
- Preceded by: Pablo Sanchez Velarde
- Succeeded by: Pablo Sanchez Velarde

Member of the Board of Supreme Attorneys
- Incumbent
- Assumed office 14 June 2022

Personal details
- Born: Liz Patricia Benavides Vargas; 9 February 1969 (age 57) Huancavelica, Peru
- Education: University of Lima (LLB); University of Jaén (LLM); Universidad Alas Peruanas (SJD)
- Occupation: Lawyer

Liz Patricia Benavides Vargas (born February 9, 1969) is a Peruvian lawyer. On June 20, 2022, she was elected as Attorney General of Peru and was removed from her position on 7 December 2023 as a result of the Peruvian Public Ministry controversy.

== Early life ==
Benavides was born on February 9, 1969, in Huancavelica.

Benavides studied law at the Universidad de Lima where she would receive her Bachelor of Laws degree. In 1995, she finished four semesters of masters studies at the University of San Martín de Porres. Thirteen years later, she would receive her "Master in Civil and Commercial Law" degree after she submitted her thesis to Universidad Alas Peruanas in 2008 and in 2009, she would receive her doctorate degree from the same university.

Benavides moved to Chile, where she lived for a while after enrolling at the Universidad del Desarrollo de Chile in Santiago, graduating from there with a post-degree in business legal advice. She also traveled to, and lived for a short period in, Spain, where she studied at Universidad de Jaen and obtained a master's degree in criminal law and constitutional guarantees.

== Career ==
In 2009, Benavides used her recently obtained degrees to pursue a career in the National Council of the Magistracy as a deputy prosecutor, though she was placed on reserve as her scores were not high enough for the position. Attorney General Gladys Echaíz would add two additional positions in 2011, allowing Benavides to become a deputy prosecutor. Benavides would work with the five Peruvian attorney generals before her, and was involved in notable cases (such as the "La Centralita", "Red Orellana" and "Los Cuellos Blancos del Puerto" cases) to be seen and those involved in them prosecuted. Many of those cases garnered national and international attention.

Peru's previous attorney general, Zoraida Ávalos, ended her three years term in that position in March 2022; she was substituted by Pablo Sánchez Velarde, who accepted the position on an interim basis. On 20 June 2022, Benavides was voted as the new attorney general, and on 2 July, she was sworn in as the country's attorney general. She is scheduled to hold the position until 2025.

She has declared that investigating Peruvian president Pedro Castillo was one of her top priorities during her term as attorney general. In October 2022, she declared that President Castillo was the head of a criminal organization and called on Congress to remove him from office, though this act was described as unconstitutional due to its violation of Article 117 of the Constitution of Peru according to constitutional experts.

Benavides announced investigations into Castillo's successor, Dina Boluarte, as well as others for actions committed during the 2022–2023 Peruvian political protests. She would also remove human rights prosecutors from cases surrounding injured protesters and move investigations from rural areas to Lima, angering the family of victims who said Benavides sought to hinder their monitoring of the investigations.

== Investigations ==
Benavides has faced multiple investigations surrounding her conduct as the Attorney General of Peru and about her background. In a report, IDL-Reporteros would write that the degrees bestowed upon Benavides by Universidad Alas Peruanas occurred despite the university not legally being authorized to award such degrees as the institution did not have specific classes dedicated towards such studies. In addition, the "Master in Civil and Commercial Law" degree did not exist in the state education system nor was it ever offered by the Universidad Alas Peruanas according to IDL-Reporteros.

Benavides was also investigated for relationship with far-right politician Rafael López Aliaga, reportedly receiving gifts from him, and possible inconsistencies with her theses from her academic career.

Fujimorists and members of La Resistencia Dios, Patria y Familia have typically defended Benavides. When former attorney general Martín Salas Zegarra raised concerns about Benavides' relationship with her sister Emma, he was blocked by Fujimorists of the Congressional Justice Commission.

=== Operation Valkyrie V ===
Benavides' sister, judge Emma Benavides Vargas, has been investigated for alleged connections to a criminal organization and reportedly releasing a pair of drug traffickers in exchange for money. Benavides fired Bersabeth Revilla, the prosecutor tasked with investigating her sister. On 3 August 2022, Benavides denied using her position to protect her sister. The National Board of Justice (JNJ) opened a preliminary investigations of Benavides firing Revilla and her educational background in early 2023. Fujimorist lawmakers then defended her from being investigated by the JNJ.

In mid-August 2023, Benavides filed a lawsuit to the Constitutional Court of Peru to demand an end to investigations.

On 29 August 2023, the Constitutional Court would order the suspension of investigations against Benavides by the JNJ. Following this, Congress would attempt to remove Tello from her position on the JNJ in early September 2023, approving an expedited investigation against the JNJ. The move by Congress was condemned by some Peruvian media outlets and multiple international NGOs, all of which described the actions as a "parliamentary coup". The letter signed by the NGOs also called for the application of the Inter-American Democratic Charter. The Inter-American Commission on Human Rights, the Inter-American Court of Human Rights and the United Nations office in Peru would express concern about Congress' actions against the JNJ and call for maintaining a balance of powers.

On 27 November 2023, special prosecutors in an investigation known as Operation Valkyrie V accused Benavides of leading a criminal network in an effort to maintain control of the Public Ministry and influence congress. Benavides described the investigation as a planned attack against her. President Dina Boluarte called for Benavides to resign from her position on 29 November.
