= Josué Gutiérrez Cóndor =

Peruvian politician

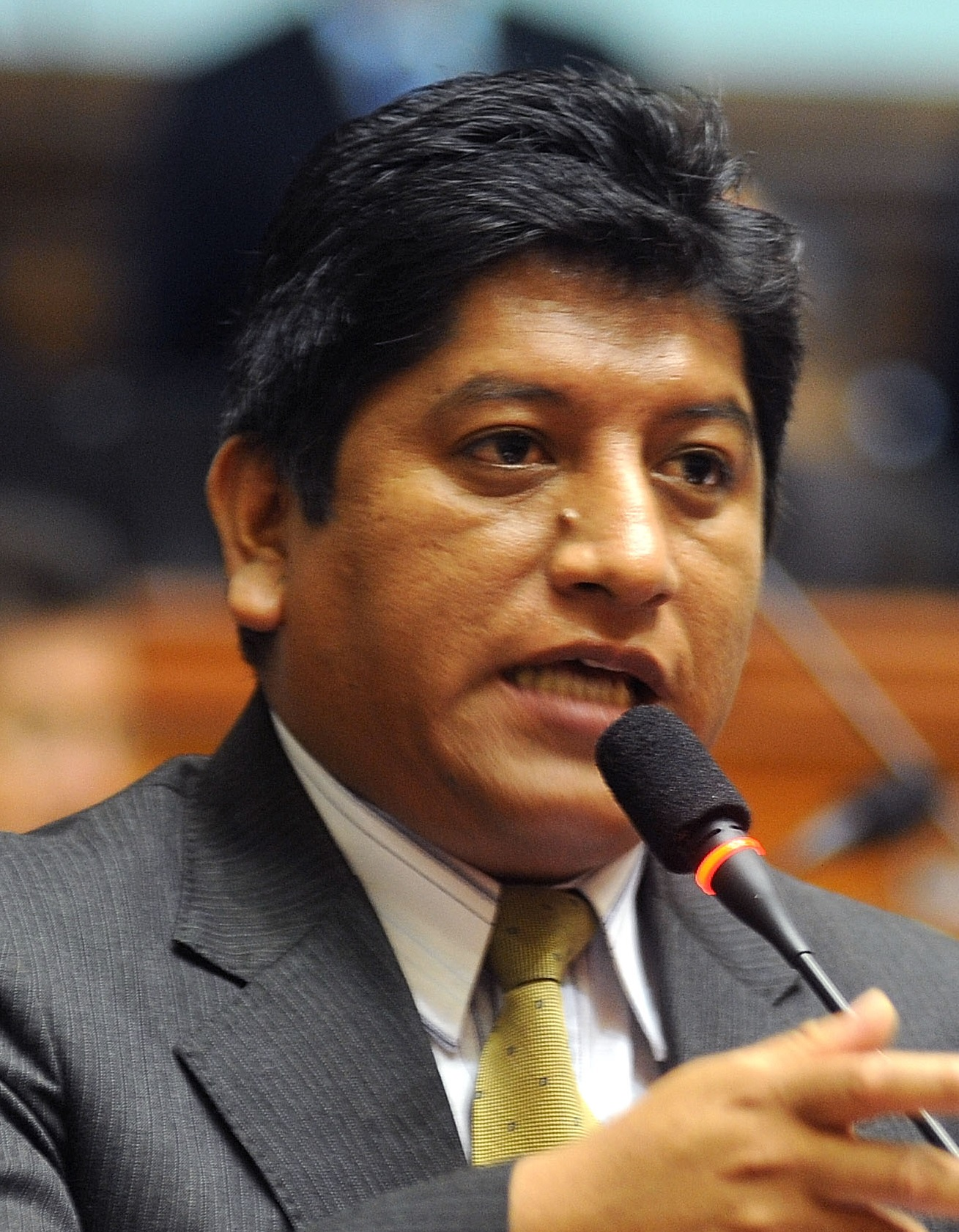

Ombudsman of Peru
- Incumbent
- Assumed office 19 May 2023
- Preceded by: Eliana Revollar

Member of Congress
- In office 27 July 2011 – 26 July 2016
- Constituency: Huánuco

Personal details
- Born: May 1, 1972 (age 54) Cerro de Pasco, Peru
- Party: Free Peru (2022–2023); Peruvian Nationalist Party (2012–2021)
- Education: University of Huánuco (LL.B.)
- Occupation: Lawyer

Josué Manuel Gutiérrez Cóndor is a Peruvian lawyer and politician. He served as a member of the Congress of Peru from 2011 to 2016. In May 2023, he was appointed Ombudsman of Peru by Congress.

== Early life and education ==
Gutiérrez was born on 1 May 1972 in Cerro de Pasco, Peru. He graduated from the University of Huánuco with a Bachelor of Laws, immediately entering a political career following his graduation.

== Career ==
=== Congress ===
During the 2011 Peruvian general election, Gutiérrez was elected congressman of Huánuco as a member of Peru Wins, serving between 2011 and 2016. While in Congress, he was president of the Budget Committee and was vice president of the Economy Committee.

=== Ombudsman ===
On 19 May 2023, Fujimorists in Congress, Popular Action and Free Peru allied to appoint Gutiérrez Cóndor as Ombudsman of Peru. According to IDL-Reporteros, this alliance to appoint Gutiérrez, who lacked previous experience related to human rights, occurred during a push by Fujimorists to establish allies within Peru's institutions and to prevent investigations of abuse by the government. The nomination was controversial as Peru was experiencing one of its worst periods of human rights in its recent history, questions of conflict of interest were raised and his appointment was supported by far-right groups in Congress who were attempting to remove Peru from the jurisdiction of the Inter-American Court of Human Rights.

== Political ties ==
Gutiérrez served as the lawyer for Vladimir Cerrón, leader of the far-left Free Peru. He has also been linked to far-right groups in Peru, including the neo-fascist La Resistencia Dios, Patria y Familia and the party of Keiko Fujimori, Popular Force. Both Cerrón and Fujimori, who allied to nominate Gutiérrez as ombudsman, face criminal charges.
