= Public Ministry of Peru =

- Ministerio Público del Perú
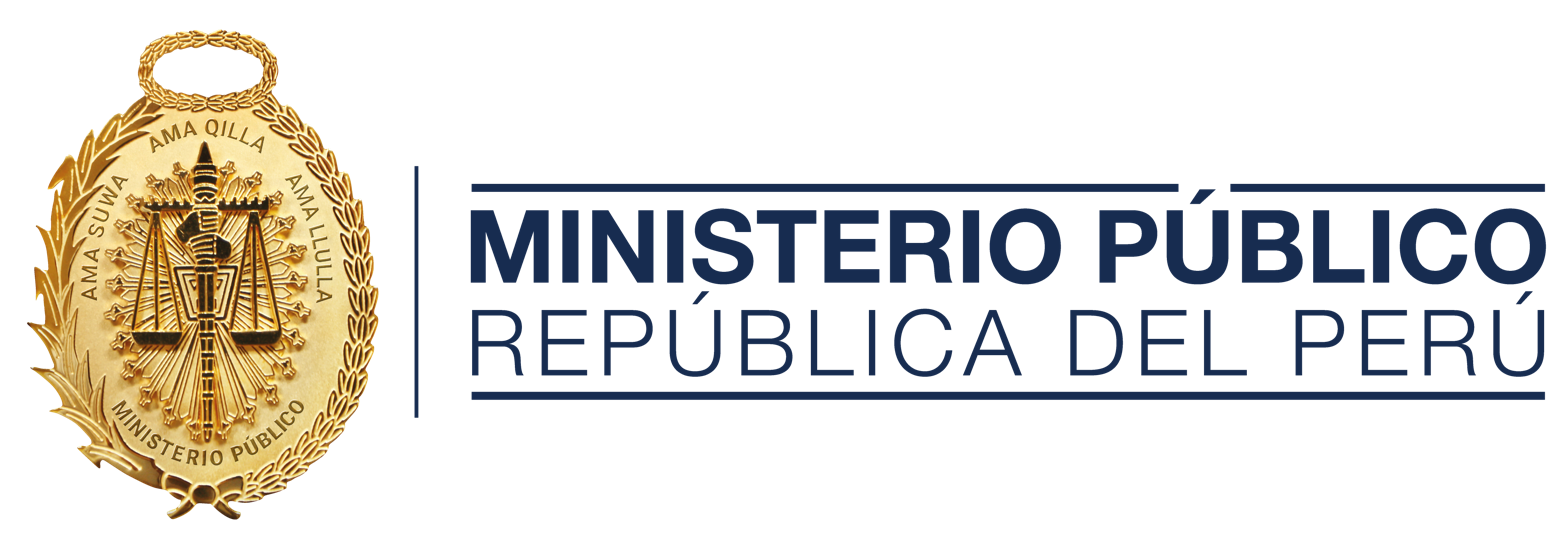

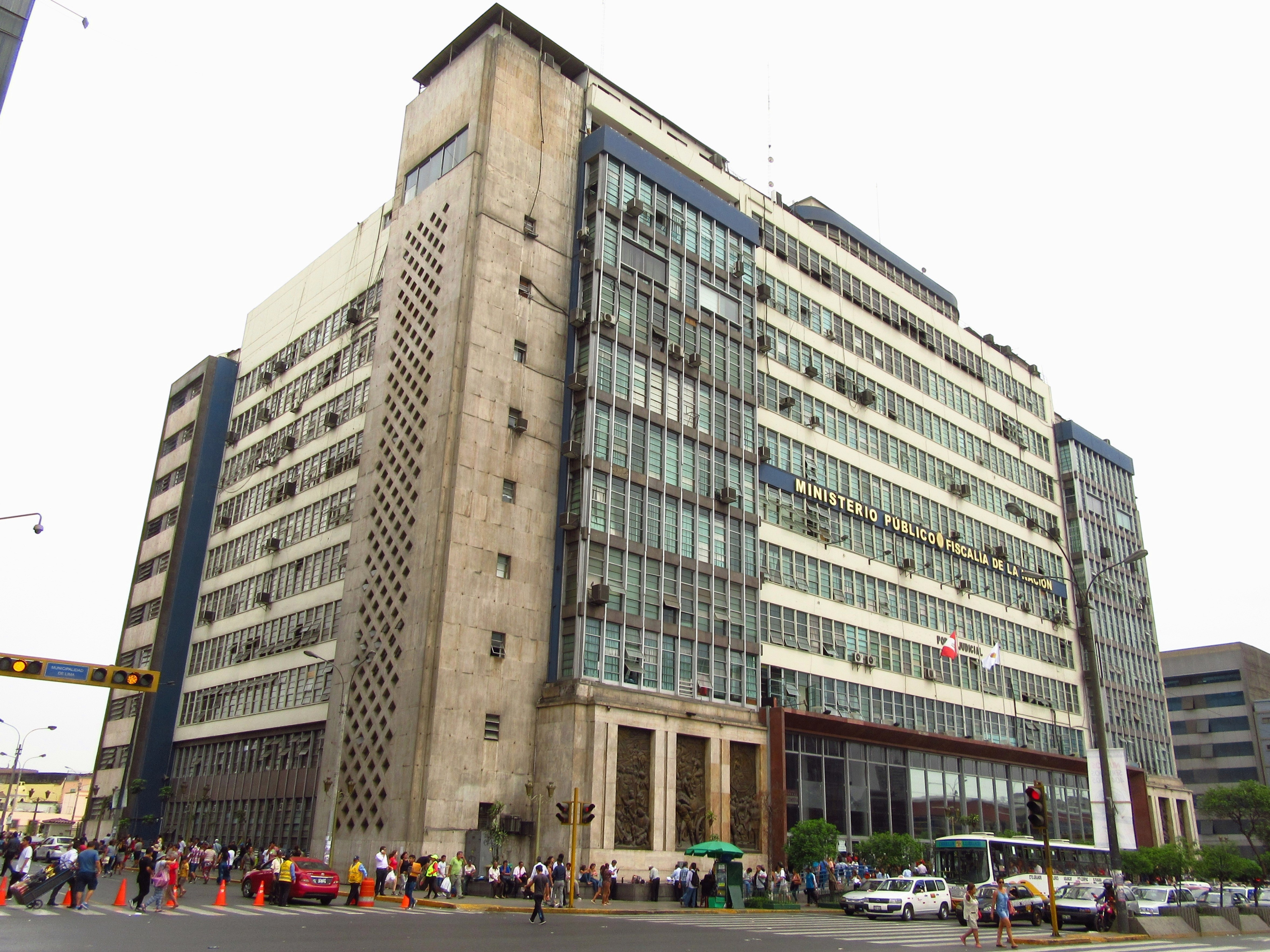
- Headquarters at Abancay Avenue

Agency overview
- Formed: 1979; 47 years ago
- Jurisdiction: Peru
- Headquarters: Barrios Altos, Lima
- Motto: Ama suwa, ama qilla ama llulla (Don't be a thief, don't be a liar, don't be lazy)
- Agency executive: Tomás Gálvez, Attorney General of Peru
- Website: mpfn.gob.pe

The Public Ministry of Peru (Spanish: Ministerio Público), also known as the Prosecutor's Office of Peru (Spanish: Fiscalía del Perú), is an autonomous entity of the Government of Peru that is responsible for enforcing law in Peru. Headed by the Prosecutor of the Nation, the Public Ministry oversees investigations surrounding private citizens, public interest and legislative interrogatives.

== History ==
Following the creation of the Supreme Court of Peru in 1825, an entity similar to the Public Ministry served under the chief national court. The 1828 Constitution of Peru established a Supreme Court with seven justices and a prosecutor.

Jorge Basadre notes that in the National Convention of 1855, functions for a national prosecutor were more defined. By 1930, it was indicated in Article 2 of the Code of Procedure in Criminal Matters that public criminal prosecution was performed by a proseuctor's office that was overseen by the Ministry of Justice. In the 1979 Constitution of Peru, the Public Ministry of Peru was officially established as an independent body from the Ministry of Justice.

== Organization ==
=== Attorney General of Peru ===
The Attorney General of Peru heads the Public Ministry. Individuals in the office must be over 45 years old and are appointed by the National Board of Justice (JNJ).

N.º	Name	Term started	Term ended
1	Gonzalo Ortiz de Zevallos Roedel	1981	1983
2	Miguel Cavero-Egúsquiza Saavedra	May 1983	May 1984
3	Álvaro Rey De Castro	May 1984	May 1985
4	César Elejalde Estenssoro	1985	1987
5	Hugo Denegri Cornejo	1987	1989
6	Manuel Catacora Gonzales	April 1989	March 1991
7	Pedro Méndez Jurado	1991	1992
8	Blanca Nélida Colán Maguiño	1992	1997
9	Miguel Aljovín Swayne	1997	2000
10	Nelly Calderón Navarro	2001	2005
11	Flora Adelaida Bolívar Arteaga	2006	2008
12	Gladys Echaíz de Núñez-Ízaga	2008	2011
13	José Antonio Peláez Bardales	2011	2014
14	Carlos Ramos Heredia	2014	2015
15	Pablo Sánchez Velarde	5 July 2015	7 June 2018
16	Pedro Chávarry Vallejos	7 June 2018	8 January 2019
17	Zoraida Ávalos Rivera	8 January 2019	30 March 2022
18	Pablo Sánchez Velarde	30 March 2022	20 June 2022
19	Patricia Benavides Vargas	20 June 2022	7 December 2023
20	Pablo Sánchez Velarde	7 December 2023	11 December 2023
21	Juan Carlos Villena Campana	11 December 2023	18 October 2024
22	Delia Espinoza Valenzuela	18 October 2024	19 September 2025
23	Pablo Sánchez Velarde	19 September 2025	22 September 2025
24	Tomás Aladino Gálvez Villegas	22 September 2025	

=== Districts ===
The Public Ministry has 34 districts:

1. Amazonas
2. Áncash
3. Apurímac
4. Arequipa
5. Ayacucho
6. Cajamarca
7. Callao
8. Cañete
9. Cuzco
10. Huancavelica
11. Huánuco
12. Huaura
13. Ica
14. Junin
15. La Libertad
16. Lambayeque
17. Lima
18. Lima Este
19. Lima Norte
20. Lima Noroeste
21. Lima-Sur
22. Loreto
23. Madre de Dios
24. Moquegua
25. Pasco
26. Piura
27. Puno
28. San Martín
29. Santa
30. Sullana
31. Tacna
32. Tumbes
33. Ucayali
34. Selva Central

== See also ==
- Ministry of Justice (Peru)
- Peruvian Public Ministry controversy
