= Deface Peru =

Peruvian hacker collective

- Type: Hacktivism
- Website: DefacePeru1 Telegram Channel

Deface Perú is the name of a collective of hackers from Peru that have performed a series of cyberattacks on government entities. They primarily operate on the Telegram messaging application. Deface Perú uses the motto "El Perú sobre todo (UR)" Spanish for "Peru above all ", a reference to Revolutionary Union (Peru), a fascist political party from the 1930s.

== Reported cyberattacks ==
On 31 May 2025, it was reported that the collective took control of the website of the municipality of Arequipa, denouncing the alleged corruption under Mayor Víctor Hugo Rivera. In the attack, in addition to leaking documents, the collective published a message against the municipality. The municipality of Arequipa later reported it had regained control of the page, though they did not issue statements about the accusations.

=== Operation Leticia ===
Through its Telegram channel, the collective announced on 5 August 2025 the "leak of the Main Portal of the Government of Colombia" during the border conflict between Peru and Colombia regarding the Santa Rosa Island. Deface Peru published a .zip file titled "GOV.CO.ZIP" with screenshots of the Colombian government's website hosting messages such as "[GUSTAVO] PETRO TRAIDOR" and "You were hacked by Peru."

=== Colombian Air Force leak ===
On 25 August 2025, leaked data from the Colombian Air Force included seven databases in Excel format, with two of these including names and identifiers of 22,360 people listed as part of the Revolutionary Armed Forces of Colombia (FARC). According to the verification of the data, they belonged to data of demobilized of the subversive organization.

=== DIRIN Leaks ===
On 4 September 2025, documents related to the Intelligence Directorate (DIRIN) of the National Police of Peru (PNP) were leaked as an act of protest against acts of corruption.

=== Gen Z protests leaks ===
On 28 September 2025, Deface Peru carried out a cyberattack on the newspaper El Peruano within the framework of the protests of Generation Z, leaving a message on the website criticizing the government.

The collective reportedly leaked the personal data of 3,000 PNP officers deployed to respond to the Gen Z protests, with their faces and identification numbers being visible in the leaked information.
