= Peruvian ombudsman =

Office of the Peruvian ombudsman

Office of the Public Defender
- Defensoría del Pueblo
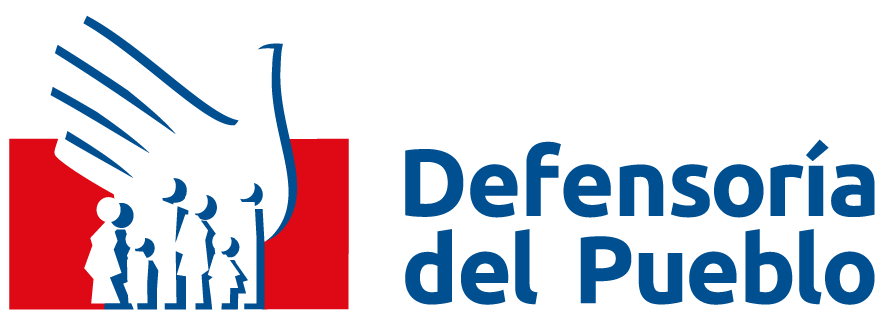
- Logo of the Office of the Public Defender

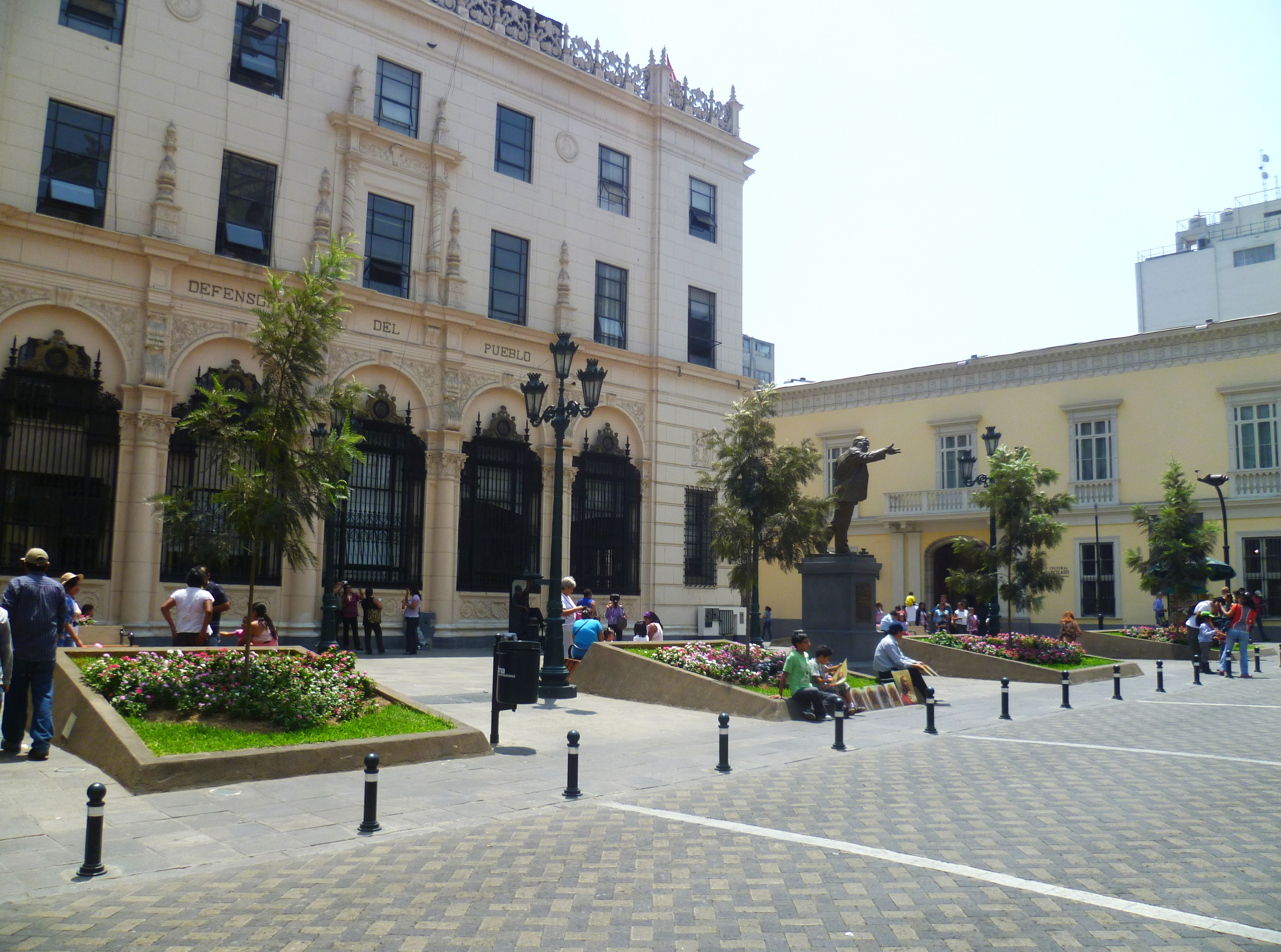

Ombudsmanship overview
- Formed: 1995
- Jurisdiction: Government of Peru
- Headquarters: Jirón Ucayali 394-398, Lima, Peru
- Ombudsmanship executive: Josué Gutiérrez Cóndor, Defensor del Pueblo
- Website: www.defensoria.gob.pe

The Ombudsman's Office of Peru is an autonomous constitutional organization created during the presidency of Alberto Fujimori that was added to the 1993 Constitution of Peru. It is based in the city of Lima, capital of Peru, and has representation throughout the Peruvian territory.

== Role ==
According to Chapter XI of the current Peruvian constitution states that the role of the Public Defender or Ombudsperson of Peru and its organization are to protect the constitutional rights and freedoms of the individual and the community; monitor the performance of the duties of the state administration and the provision of public services to the population.

The Ombudsman is the head of the National Ombudsman, directing and representing the institution. He's elected by the Congress of the Republic for a five-year period. Following the Constitution and Organic Law, he enjoys complete independence for the fulfilment of the functions that the Constitution confers on him.

The Ombudsman looks for a solution to specific problems before accusing anyone. He is not a judge, nor a prosecutor. Hence, he does not pass sentences, nor order arrests. His power rests on persuasion, in behavior modification proposals that he formulates in his recommendations, the development of preventive protection strategies, in the mediation that he assumes to find solutions and in his capacity to publicly denounce in extreme cases.

== History ==
The first Peruvian Ombudsperson was Jorge Santistevan de Noriega, followed by Walter Albán, Beatriz Merino, and Eduardo Vega. The Ombudsperson in 2021 was Walter Gutiérrez Camacho and in 2022 the acting Ombudsman was Eliana Revollar.

In 2023, Fujimorists in Congress, Popular Action and Free Peru allied to appoint former lawyer of Vladimir Cerrón, Josué Gutiérrez Cóndor, as ombudsman. According to IDL-Reporteros, this alliance to appoint Gutiérrez, who lacked previous related experience to the position, occurred during a push by Fujimorists to establish allies within Peru's institutions and to prevent investigations of abuse by the government.

== Mission ==
The Ombudsman's Office protects constitutional and fundamental rights of the person and the community, supervise the fulfilment of country's administration duties and the provision of public services to the people.

Therefore, the Ombudsman's Office of Peru is a critical contributor to the country that acts, with autonomy, in the name of common good and in defence of citizenship rights. For this reason, the mandate is exerted with objectivity, professionalism and responsibility, never through arbitrary or unjustified opposition.

The Ombudsman cannot accuse nor denounce the State as he searches for solutions.
