= Supreme Court of Peru =

Highest judicial body in Peru

Supreme Court of Justice
- Corte Suprema de Justicia
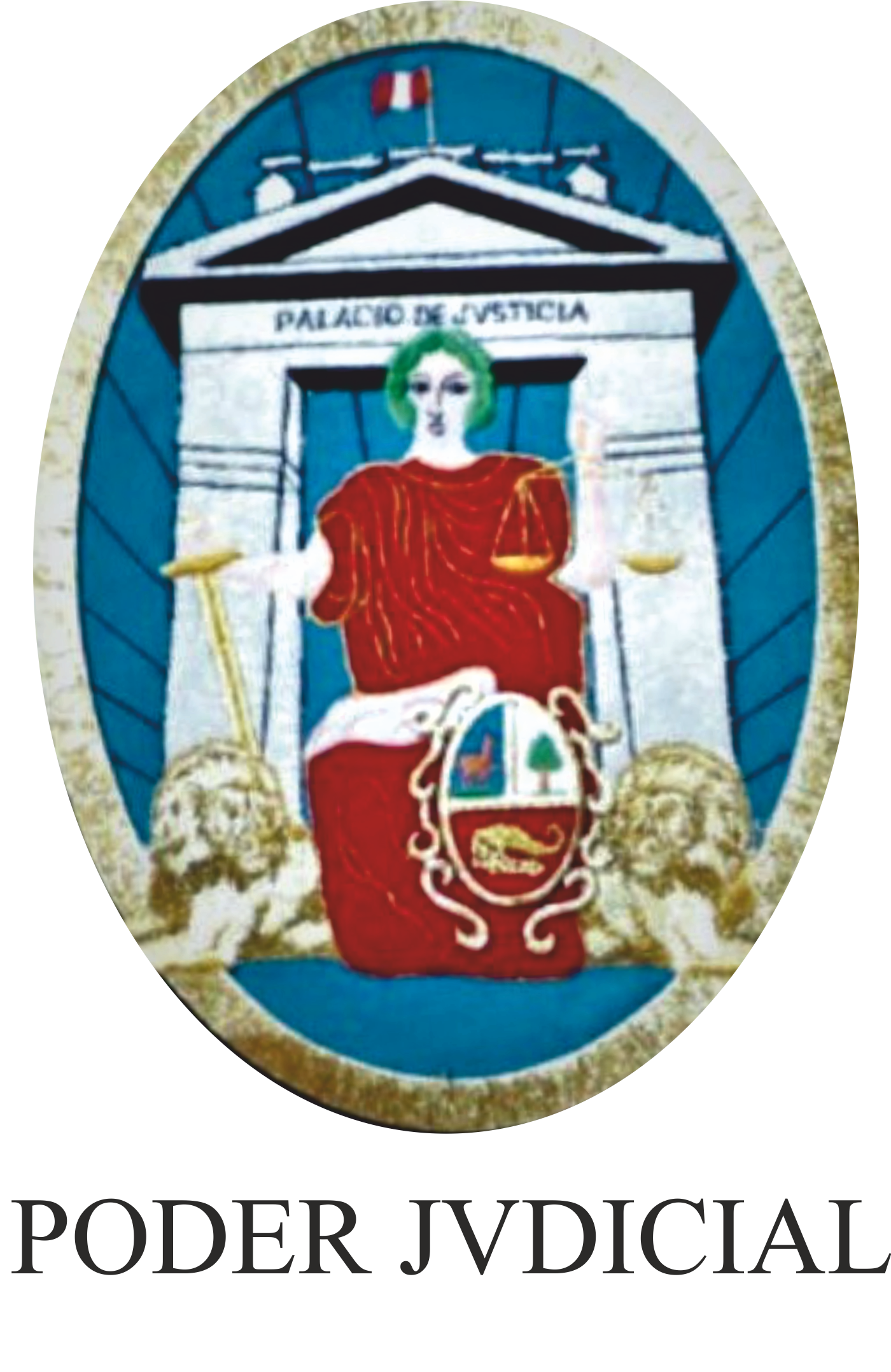
- Emblem of the Judiciary of Peru.
- Interactive map of Supreme Court of Justice
- 12°03′27″S 77°02′06″W
- Established: 1825
- Jurisdiction: Peru
- Location: Lima
- Coordinates: 12°03′27″S 77°02′06″W
- Composition method: Selected by the National Board of Justice
- Authorised by: Constitution of Peru
- Judge term length: 70 years old. At that age, the National Board of Justice can keep the judges for an additional term of seven years, following the same process established for the appointment. The seven-year extension can be repeated indefinitely.
- Number of positions: 15
- Annual budget: S/ 2.27 billion
- Website: http://www.pj.gob.pe/

Chief Justice
- Currently: Janet Tello Gilardi
- Since: 2 January 2025; 21 months ago

The Supreme Court of Justice is the highest judicial court in Peru. Its jurisdiction extends over the entire territory of the nation. It is headquartered in the Palace of Justice in Lima. The current Chief Justice is Janet Tello Gilardi.

== Structure ==
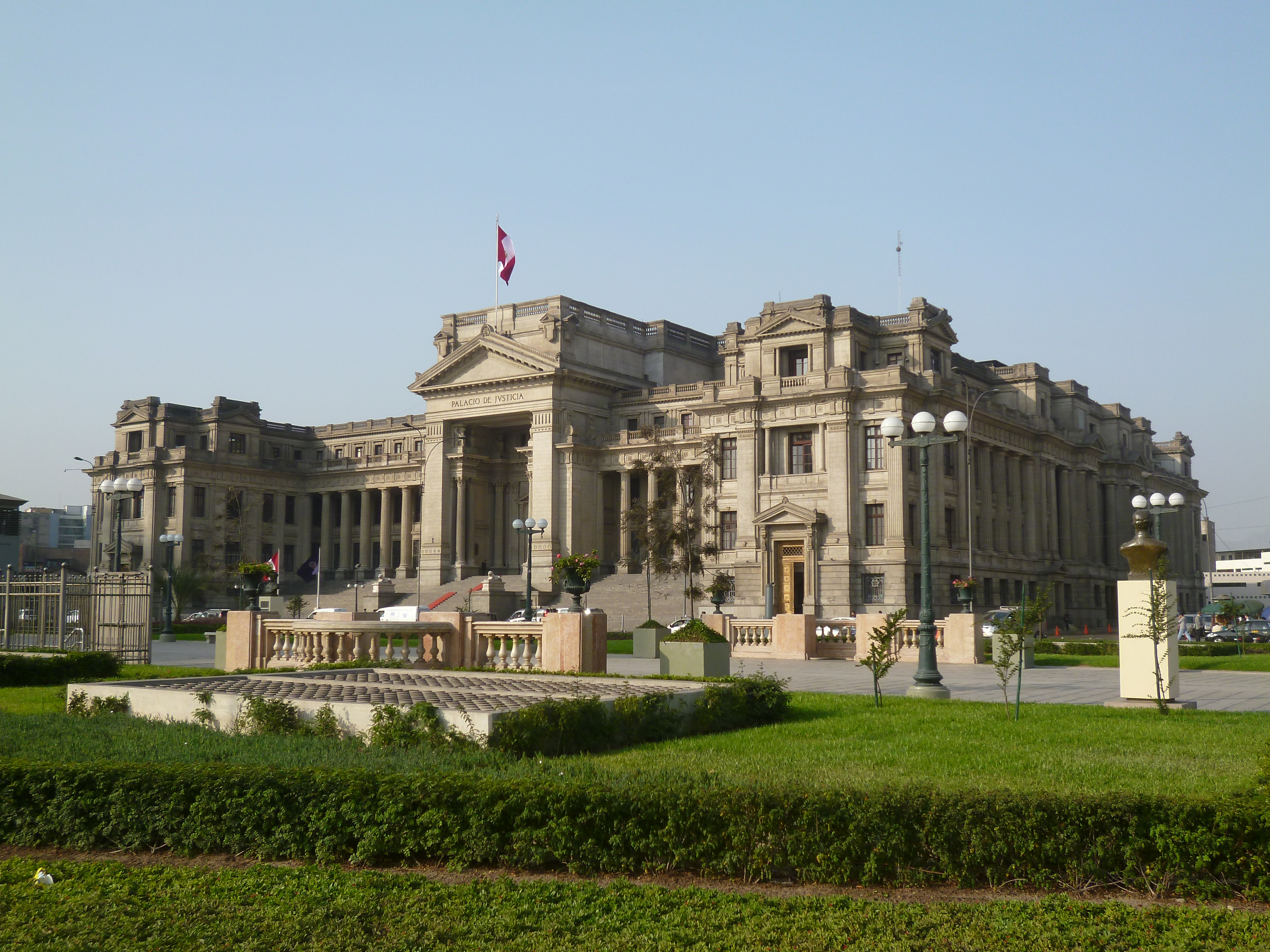
The Palacio de Justicia in Lima, the headquarters of the Supreme Court.

The supreme court is composed of three Supreme Sectors:

- Civil Sector: Presides over all topics related to civil rights and commercial law.
- Criminal Sector: Presides over all topics relating to criminal law
- Constitutional and Social Sector: Presides over all topics relating to constitutional rights and labor law

Integrated into the Supreme Court are the supreme speakers and supreme provisionary speakers, who substitute the supreme speakers in case of absence. The supreme speakers are distributed into each one of the Supreme Sectors that the law establishes. The president of the Supreme Court and the chief speaker of the Office of the Control of the Magistrature are not integrated into any Supreme Sector. The Supreme Court consists of three permanent Supreme Sectors (Civil, Criminal, and Constitutional and Social). Each Supreme Sector has five supreme speakers who elect a president within each other.

== Mechanisms ==
The Constitution guarantees the right to the double instance, which the Supreme Court recognizes. In event that this right is failed, the appeals in the processes that interpose before the Superior Sectors, or it is brought before the Supreme Court. The Abrogation doctrine is also recognized by this court.

== Members ==
=== Chief Justice ===
- Janet Tello Gilardi

=== Justices ===
- César San Martín Castro (since 2004)
- Victor Roberto Prado Saldarriaga (since 2007)
- Ana María Aranda Rodríguez (since 2011)
- Javier Arévalo Vela (since 2011)
- Jorge Luis Salas Arenas (since 2011)
- Héctor Enrique Lama More (since 2016)
- Carlos Giovanni Arias Lazarte (since 2017)
- Mariem Vicky de la Rosa Bedriñana (since 2019)
- Carlos Alberto Calderón Puertas (since 2022)
- Emilia Bustamante Oyague (since 2022)
- Ulises Augusto Yaya Zumaeta (since 2022)
- Manuel Estuardo Luján Tupez (since 2022)
- Víctor Antonio Castillo León (since 2022)
- Roberto Rolando Burneo Bermejo (since 2022) (Note: Also the current president of the National Jury of Elections)
