= IDL-Reporteros =

- Website type: Online newspaper
- Available in: Spanish
- Founded: 2009
- Headquarters: Lima, {{{location_country}}}
- Founder: Gustavo Gorriti
- Parent: Institute of Legal Defense
- Website: idl-reporteros.pe

IDL-Reporteros is an online newspaper based in Lima, Peru, that specializes in investigative journalism against corruption in Peru and to promote transparency with the nation. Since its founding, the newspaper has initiated over 500 investigations throughout Peru. The site has also been awarded both nationally and internationally for its coverage of investigations dedicated against corruption.

== History ==
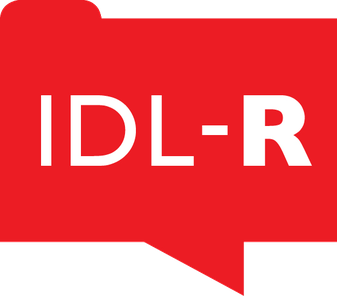
Former logo of IDL-Reporteros

The newspaper was founded in October 2009 by veteran reporter Gustavo Gorriti, initially with only two reporters. One of the first main investigations occurred in February 2010, with the report involving the purchase of armoured personnel carrier by the Peruvian Armed Forces at a highly inflated price later being spread through national media outlets.

IDL-Reporteros assisted the International Consortium of Investigative Journalists with journalistic and research work involved in the 2021 Pandora Papers leak.

== Recognition ==
IDL-Reporteros is a member of the Global Investigative Journalism Network, has been supported by the Open Society Foundations and was recognized as an Ashoka Changemaker as part of the Ashoka Fellows project. Human rights organizations in Venezuela, including PROVEA and Transparency Venezuela, have expressed support and collaborated with the newspaper.

=== Awards ===
IDL-Reporteros won the 2018 National Journalism Grand Prize for its Lava Juez investigations. In 2019, the site won the Global Shining Light Award related to the Lava Juez investigations. The Best Written Report of the National Journalism Award was awarded to IDL-Reporteros in 2021 for two articles; "The dead that the government does not count" and "The brigade of the dead". In 2023, the site won the Gabo Image Award for its article "Ayacucho: Radiography of homicides", covering the Ayacucho massacre that occurred during the protests in 2022.
