= Corruption in Peru =

Corruption in Peru is a serious concern for the nation. On Transparency International's 2025 Corruption Perceptions Index, Peru scored 31 on a scale from 0 ("highly corrupt") to 100 ("very clean"). When ranked by score, Peru ranked 130th among the 182 countries in the Index, where the country ranked first is perceived to have the most honest public sector. For comparison with regional scores, the best score among the countries of the Americas (Note: Argentina, Bahamas, Barbados, Belize, Bolivia, Brazil, Canada, Chile, Colombia, Costa Rica, Cuba, Dominica, Dominican Republic, Ecuador, El Salvador, Grenada, Guatemala, Guyana, Haiti, Honduras, Jamaica, Mexico, Nicaragua, Panama, Paraguay, Peru, Saint Lucia, Saint Vincent and the Grenadines, Suriname, Trinidad and Tobago, United States of America, Uruguay, Venezuela) was 75, the average score was 42 and the worst score was 10. For comparison with worldwide scores, the best score was 89 (ranked 1), the average score was 42, and the worst score was 9 (ranked 181, in a two-way tie).

According to the 2021 AmericasBarometer survey of the Latin American Public Opinion Project (LAPOP), 88% of Peruvians believe that half to all politicians in the nation are corrupt, the highest percentage in Latin America according to the study.

== History ==
=== Fujimori government ===
Peru's most prominent political corruption scandal is probably the case of Alberto Fujimori, Peru's President from 1990 to 2000. In 2000, Fujimori resigned and fled to Japan. He was extradited to Peru from Chile in 2007 and in April 2009 was sentenced to 25 years in prison for authorizing murders by death squads and for two kidnappings.

During his rule, Fujimori helped to maintain the government's image of honesty by using his advisor, Vladimiro Montesinos, to carry out the administration's corrupt procedures. Montesinos served as the head of the National Intelligence Service (SIN) where he systematically bribed politicians, judges, and the news media. An empirical analysis of Montesinos' corruption conducted by John McMillan and Pablo Zoido describes how Montesinos used over 75% of SIN's unsupervised budget to bribe over 1,600 individuals. McMillan and Zoido estimate that at the height of the scandal more than U.S.$3.5 million was being paid monthly to various congressmen, judges and media executives. The most common bribes were paid to television-channel owners which allowed Fujimori's administration to control the media and politically influence Peruvians.

=== Recent history ===
After further scandals and facing a second impeachment vote, Pedro Kuczynski, his successor, resigned the presidency on 21 March 2018 following the release of videos showing alleged acts of vote buying, presenting his resignation to the Council of Ministers. As a result of the Odebrecht scandal and other controversies, in 2018 all of Peru's living former presidents were either imprisoned or the focus of corruption investigations.

== Bribery ==
Irregular payments and bribes are often demanded from companies operating in Peru, and government contracts are often awarded to well-connected companies. Many companies experience the demand for facilitation payments as a result of Peru's extensive bureaucracy.

== See also ==
- Crime in Peru
- International Anti-Corruption Academy
- Group of States Against Corruption
- International Anti-Corruption Day
- ISO 37001 Anti-bribery management systems
- United Nations Convention against Corruption
- OECD Anti-Bribery Convention
- Transparency International
