= National Board of Justice =

Peruvian government institution

- Junta Nacional de Justicia

Agency overview
- Formed: 1995
- Jurisdiction: Government of Peru
- Headquarters: Paseo de la República No. 3295 San Isidro, Lima, Peru
- Website: www.gob.pe/jnj

The National Board of Justice (Spanish: Junta Nacional de Justicia), formerly the National Council of the Magistracy, is an autonomous constitutional institution that is part of the Republic of Peru. Its primary function is to appoint and ratify all judges and prosecutors in the Peruvian justice system as well as to remove those that fail to fulfill their responsibilities.

== History ==
Different systems have been used since independence by the Peruvian government to designate impartial judges and prosecutors. The 1933 Peruvian Constitution set up a system similar to that of Article Three of the United States Constitution which gave the executive branch the power to appoint judges with the ratification of the Senate.

Juan Velasco Alvarado removed most of the judges that served as part of the Supreme Court shortly after coming to power in 1968. A "National Council of Justice" was set up as an autonomous institution not dependent of any of the branches of government. This was done to solve corruption issues within the judiciary branch as well as to prevent politics from infiltrating said branch. The function of the Council was similar to that of the modern National Board of Justice.

=== The National Council of the Magistrature in the 1979 Constitution ===
The National Council of the Magistrature was codified as part of the 1979 Peruvian Constitution. The function of the Council was that of screening and proposing judges. Supreme Court Justices were proposed to the President by the Council and then in turn to the Senate which ratified the appointments. Lower court judges were chosen by the Council and then ratified by District Magistrate Councils.

The 1979 Constitution version of the Council was modeled after the Italian High Council of the Judiciary and was similar to other councils in Colombia, Ecuador, Bolivia, and Venezuela. It was composed of seven members who served three year terms. The Prosecutor General presided over the Council while the other six members were two representatives from the Supreme Court, one from the National Federation of Bar Associations of Peru, one from the Lima Bar Association, and two representing Peruvian Law Schools.

=== The National Council of the Magistrature in the 1993 Constitution ===
After the 1992 Peruvian constitutional crisis and the adoption of the 1993 Peruvian Constitution, the Council gained greater autonomy and responsibility. The 1993 Peruvian Constitution gave the Council the power of appointing and removing all judges and prosecutors. It also required that all appointees were re-elected or removed from office every seven years. The counselors were no longer members of different governmental organizations and civil institutions that served in an advisory roll. They were now full-time counselors that were chosen by a special body of electors for a five-year term.

=== 2018 scandal and Constitutional Referendum ===
A series of wiretaps were published by the press starting in July 2018 which recorded counselors speaking with prominent businessmen and judges which showed vast cronyism within the system.

President Martín Vizcarra convened Congress into a special session concerning the removal of all seven counselors on 20 July 2018. Congress removed all seven Counselors by a unanimous vote. The National Council was declared in emergency for nine months a week later. Most of the Council's personnel was dismissed, the Council's organic law was revoked, and all processes being considered by the Council were put on hold.

During his yearly message to Congress, President Vizcarra, called for a new Constitutional amendment which would change the composition of the Council as well as the requirements to become a counselor. He also asked that all appointments and ratification done by the council in recent years be revised.

The Constitutional Amendment proposed by the Executive branch brought down the number of counselors from 7 to 5. It also proposed that counselors would be appointed by a special committee made up of the President of the Judicial Branch, the Prosecutor General, the President of the Constitutional Tribunal, the Ombudsman, and the Comptroller General. Further, Counselors would have to be licensed lawyers with at least 30 years of experience and of good reputation. The President asked that the proposed Constitutional changes be ratified by the people via referendum.

The final amendment as approved by Congress maintained the number of counselors at 7 as well as the composition of the committee as proposed by the Executive branch. The amendment was ratified by the population as the first of four Constitutional amendments voted for in the 2018 Peruvian constitutional referendum. Also, the amendment changed the name of the Council to the National Board of Justice.

== Composition ==
The board is independent of the rest of the Peruvian government and it is ruled by its own organic law. The members of the board are known as counselors and serve for a five-year term and may not be re-elected to a consecutive term. Counselors must be (1) natural-born citizens; (2) an eligible voter; (3) between the ages of 45 and 75 years old; (4) a lawyer with at least 25 years of practice, teaching experience, or 15 years of legal research; (5) free from court convictions; (6) of recognized academic excellence and good moral character.

The board consist of seven members, which are elected by a special committee which is called into session by the Ombudsman six months before the end of the board's term. The members of the special council are the Ombudsman, who presides the committee; the Chief Justice of the Supreme Court; the Prosecutor General; the President of Constitutional Court; the Comptroller General; a dean elected by the deans of all private universities; and a dean elected by the deans of all public universities.

Congress may remove any of the members of the board due to gross misconduct by a two-thirds vote.

== Function ==
The 1993 Peruvian Constitution delineates the board's responsibilities. Its primary function is to appoint and periodically ratify all judges and prosecutors in the Peruvian justice system; as well as to remove those that fail to fulfill their responsibilities. This includes decisions regarding the ascension of judges and prosecutors. In this way, the judiciary branch of the Peruvian government is isolated from political and ideological interference by the other branches of government.

It also elects the head of the National Office of Electoral Processes and the head of the National Registry of Identification and Civil Status which are two of the three institutions in charge of the electoral system and processes.

Judge and prosecutor vacancies are filled through a merit-based public concourse which consist of public hearings, written standardized test, and applications. Counselors are explicitly prohibited of having communication with the candidates as to prevent favoritism and corruption.
