= Alberto Gálvez Olaechea =

Peruvian writer and former MRTA member

- Born: c. 1955; Peru
- Occupations: Writer, journalist
- Movement: MIR-VR; MRTA
- Status: Released
- Criminal charges: Terrorism
- Penalty: 24 years

Details
- Date apprehended: 1991

Alberto Gálvez Olaechea (born c. 1955) is a Peruvian journalist, columnist, writer, editor, and former member of Túpac Amaru Revolutionary Movement (MRTA).

== Biography ==
Gálvez had originally been part of Voz Rebelde, a splinter of the Revolutionary Left Movement, during the 1970s. After the MRTA's formation, he served as a member its "National Directorate" and as a writer for its newsletter, Semanario Cambio. He was detained by DIRCOTE in 1987, escaping from Castro Castro Prison alongside Víctor Polay Campos in 1990. In 1991, he was detained by Special Intelligence Group as part of an operation (codenamed Fortuna), which sought to identify the prison's escapees. He renounced his MRTA membership in 1992, and was eventually released from prison in 2014.

In 2015, he published a memoir, Con la palabra desarmada, and later wrote for Jacobin, an American socialist magazine that published another book of his, Entre Guerras: Militancia y activismo minero en las décadas 1970 y 1980.

In 2016, he was part of a controversy when Marisa Glave, then congresswoman of the Broad Front, was present at the presentation of the second edition of Ojo Zurdo, for which Gálvez wrote an article.

In 2023, he was investigated along with other MRTA leaders for indirect perpetration and human rights violations in the Tarapoto massacre.

== See also ==
- Américo Gilvonio Conde
- Néstor Cerpa Cartolini
