= Operation Hotel =

1989 action by the Peruvian Armed Forces

Operation Hotel (1989)
- Part of the Peruvian Internal Conflict
Date	February 3, 1989
Location	Huancayo, Junín
Result	Successful operation: Capture of Víctor Polay Campos.

Belligerents
(Peru) Peruvian Police	MRTA

Commanders and leaders
Guillermo Herrera	Víctor P. Campos (surrendered)

Casualties and losses
None casualties	2 captured

Operation Hotel, "The capture of Víctor Polay Campos" or "First capture of Victor Polay Campos" (Spanish: Operación Hotel, Captura de Víctor Polay Campos or Primera Captura de Víctor Polay Campos), was an operation carried out by the Peruvian Armed Forces in 1989 where Víctor Polay Campos, leader of the terrorist organization Túpac Amaru Revolutionary Movement (MRTA), was arrested.

== Preliminaries ==
The MRTA was a terrorist organization of Marxist-Leninist Guevarist ideology. It was led by Víctor Polay Campos and was founded in 1982 from a unification of various leftist groups. In 1984, the MRTA claimed its first terrorist action.

Following a subversive attack on the Uchiza police station in January 1989, Armando Villanueva (then Prime Minister), together with the Minister of Defense, the Minister of the Interior and the Commander-in-Chief of the Army, formed a committee to investigate what had happened. To this end, Lieutenant Colonel Roberto Contreras Ramos was entrusted with the deployment of the respective security within the framework of the "Visit Operations Plan". The committee would stay at the Hotel de Turistas in Huancayo.

== Capture ==
On February 3, 1989, the deployment of the "Visit Operations Plan" was arranged. For this purpose, two patrols were stationed at the hotel (one internal and one external, reinforced with intelligence agents), in addition to a fence at the door. The external patrol was in charge of Captain Guillermo Ortiz Herrera and the internal one of Captain Fernando Bolívar. A reserve was also available under the command of Captain Juvenal Barrientos Lara. The hotel rooms were searched by intelligence agents, with the exception of occupied rooms. In one of the rooms was Víctor Polay Campos, leader of the MRTA, who was in the city to carry out an attack against Armando Villanueva. Polay Campos had registered at the hotel under the false name of "Eudocio Rosales del Campo" being accompanied by Rosa Luz Padilla, his lover.

On the afternoon of the same day, Padilla was stopped inside the hotel by third-class warrant officer Jaime Ale Rivas, after evading external controls. When asked for her documents, Padilla tried to hide a white bag, which prompted the warrant officer to ask for the bag. The warrant officer, upon checking the bag, found a pistol. Due to nervousness and confusion, a grenade fell out of Padilla's hands, causing her to become agitated. Padilla was arrested and taken to the headquarters for interrogation . During the interrogation, Padilla said that she had been "ordered" to leave the grenade at the hotel door and that she was accompanied by her "husband." Upon learning of this, a quick plan of operations was put together, ordering the intervention of room No. 22, where Padilla was staying. The person in charge of the operation was Major Miguel Amoretti.

After the capture, Bolívar handed the terrorist leader over to Amoretti. A war grenade and several cartridges of dynamite were found in Polay Campos' belongings.

At four in the afternoon, at the hotel, Captain Bolívar together with Warrant Officer Alejandro burst into room No. 22. Alejandro would report that:

"Nos lanzamos sobre él, y después de forcejear un poco, tratando de quitarle la pistola Browning argentina y golpearlo, pudimos reducirlo. No fue fácil, porque era alto y tenía el porte algo atlético. Una vez que sucedió eso nos dijo “soy el comandante Rolando. No saben quién soy yo, soy Polay, quiero hablar con un jefe”. Trató de hacer prevalecer su grado o su importancia"

After the capture, Bolívar handed the terrorist leader over to Miguel Amoretti. A war grenade and several cartridges of dynamite were found in Víctor Polay Campos' belongings.

The capture decapitated the MRTA, whose structure suffered another hard setback after the capture of Miguel Rincón Rincón, another leader of the terrorist organization, in Lima on April 16, 1989. In 1992, Polay Campos, after escaping, would be recaptured.
