= Karate at the 2023 Pan American Games – Men's 67 kg =

Men's 67 kg at the 2023 Pan American Games
- Venue: Contact Sports Center
- Dates: November 5
- Competitors: 9 from 8 nations

Medalists
Gold medal	Andrés Madera	Venezuela
Silver medal	Tomás Freire	Chile
Bronze medal	Camilo Velozo	Chile
Bronze medal	Alberto Gálvez	Panama

The men's 67 kg competition of the karate events at the 2023 Pan American Games was held on November 5 at the Contact Sports Center (Centro de Entrenamiento de los Deportes de Contacto) in Santiago, Chile.

== Schedule ==
Date	Time	Round
November 5, 2023	09:00	Pool matches
November 5, 2023	12:45	Semifinals
November 5, 2023	13:06	Final

== Results ==
The athletes with the two best scores of each pool advance to the semifinals.

=== Pool A ===
Rk	Athlete	Pld	W	L	Pts.
1	Tomás Freire (CHI)	3	2	1	6
2	Andrés Madera (VEN)	3	2	1	6
3	Vinícius Figueira (BRA)	3	1	2	3
4	Daniel Esparza (MEX)	3	1	2	3

	Score	
Andrés Madera (VEN)	2–0	Vinícius Figueira (BRA)
Tomás Freire (CHI)	3–4	Daniel Esparza (MEX)
Andrés Madera (VEN)	8–8	Tomás Freire (CHI)
Vinícius Figueira (BRA)	4–3	Daniel Esparza (MEX)
Andrés Madera (VEN)	7–0	Daniel Esparza (MEX)
Vinícius Figueira (BRA)	3–4	Tomás Freire (CHI)

=== Pool B ===
Rk	Athlete	Pld	W	L	Pts.
1	Alberto Gálvez (PAN)	4	3	0	9
2	Camilo Velozo (CHI)	4	3	1	9
3	José Ramírez (COL)	4	2	2	6
4	Fred Proaño (ECU)	4	1	2	3
5	Gonzalo Navarro (ARG)	4	0	4	0

	Score	
Camilo Velozo (CHI)	4–1	Gonzalo Navarro (ARG)
Fred Proaño (ECU)	1–3	José Ramírez (COL)
Camilo Velozo (CHI)	2–3	Alberto Gálvez (PAN)
Gonzalo Navarro (ARG)	2–3	Fred Proaño (ECU)
Alberto Gálvez (PAN)	5–2	José Ramírez (COL)
Gonzalo Navarro (ARG)	2–5	José Ramírez (COL)
Camilo Velozo (CHI)	5–0	Fred Proaño (ECU)
Gonzalo Navarro (ARG)	0–2	Alberto Gálvez (PAN)
Camilo Velozo (CHI)	1–0	José Ramírez (COL)
Alberto Gálvez (PAN)	0–0	Fred Proaño (ECU)

=== Finals ===
The results were as follows:

Semifinals
Tomás Freire (CHI)	5
Camilo Velozo (CHI)	1
Alberto Gálvez (PAN)	2
Andrés Madera (VEN)	3

Gold medal match
Tomás Freire (CHI)	3
Andrés Madera (VEN)	3
