= Operation Café =

Operation Coffee (1992) Operation Café (1992)
- Part of the Peruvian Internal Conflict
- Type: Police Operation
- Location: San Borja, Lima, Peru
- Objective: Victor Polay Campos
- Date: June 9, 1992
- Executed by: Peruvian Police; Supported by: DINCOTE
- Outcome: Successful operation: Recapture of Victor Polay Campos and 2 emerretistas taking coffee.

The Operation Café, also known as The Recapture of Víctor Polay Campos, was a police operation carried out by the Peruvian National Police on June 9, 1992, whose objective was the capture of Víctor Polay Campos, leader of the terrorist organization Tupac Amaru Revolutionary Movement who had escaped from prison in 1990.

== Preliminary ==
In 1989, Victor Polay Campos had been arrested by Miguel Amoretti Alvino during Operation Hotel. A year later, Polay Campos along with important members of the MRTA escaped from the Castro Castro prison. The GEIN, created by Benedicto Jiménez, established Operation Fortuna, which led to the capture of Alberto Gálvez Olaechea and other important MRTA leaders on May 31, 1991. However, the whereabouts of Polay Campos was a mystery. On April 19, 1992, Peter Cárdenas Schulte, the organization's "number two", was captured.

== Development and capture ==
On June 9, 1992, the police operation that culminated in the capture of Polay Campos began. The MRTA was preparing for its First National Congress. Polay Campos was arrested, along with a lieutenant, while drinking coffee in the district of San Borja. When he was presented to the press, Polay Campos stated: "I do not regret anything". He was imprisoned in the Yanamayo Prison. After his recapture, the MRTA was in the hands of Néstor Cerpa Cartolini, who years later led the takeover of the residence of the Japanese ambassador in 1996.
