= Rocío Silva-Santisteban =

Peruvian writer

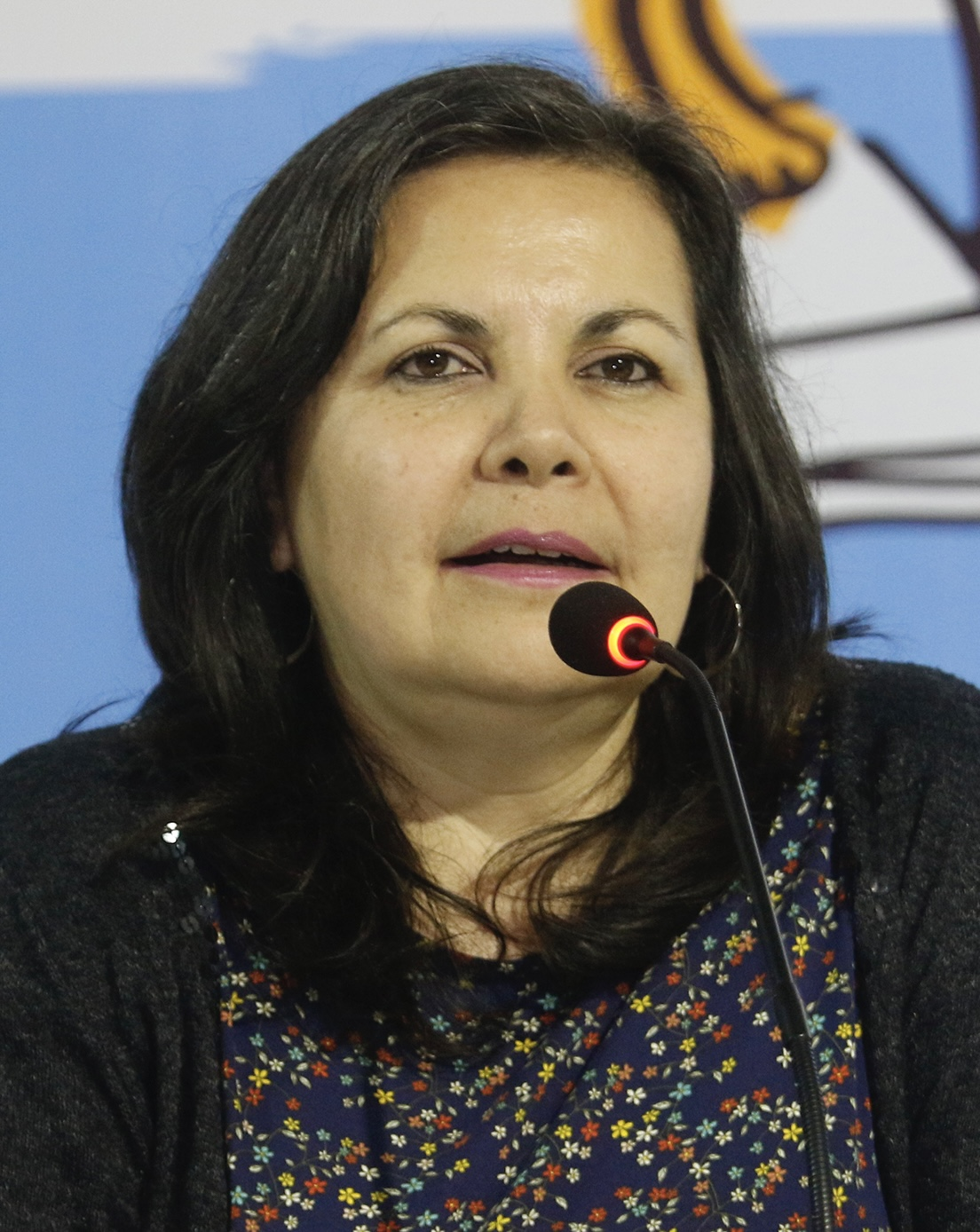
- Silva-Santisteban in 2018

President of Congress
- Acting; 15 November 2020 – 16 November 2020
- Vice President: 1st Vice President; Vacant; 2nd Vice President; Vacant; 3rd Vice President; Vacant
- Preceded by: Luis Valdez Farías (acting)
- Succeeded by: Francisco Sagasti

Member of Congress
- In office 16 March 2020 – 26 July 2021
- Constituency: Lima

Personal details
- Born: January 30, 1963 (age 63) Lima, Peru
- Party: Broad Front (2020-present)
- Domestic partner: Marco Arana (2012-2016)
- Parent: Fernando Silva Santisteban (father)
- Education: University of Lima (LL.B.); National University of San Marcos (M.A.); Boston University (Ph.D.)

Rocío Yolanda Angélica Silva-Santisteban Manrique (born 30 January 1963) is a Peruvian poet, academic, activist, and journalist. She served as a Member of Congress from 2020 to 2021.

== Early career ==
She served as Executive Secretary of the National Human Rights Coordinator from 2011 to 2015.

== Political career ==
She was elected to the Congress of the Republic of Peru in 2020 for the Lima constituency, representing the Broad Front party.

=== Presidency of Congress (2020) ===
On the 15th of November of the same year, President Manuel Merino, who ascended to the presidency of Peru five days ago upon the impeachment of President Martín Vizcarra, resigned from both the presidency and his de jure role as the president of Congress.

Silva-Santisteban becomes the acting president of Congress during the selection period for a new Congress president, who would also succeed Merino as president of Peru.

She was originally running for the presidency of Congress, but her list was rejected by Congress. The next day, Francisco Sagasti's list won a majority vote, and he became the president of Congress, which also made him the next president of Peru.
