= Fernando Silva Santisteban =

Peruvian historian and anthropologist

Fernando Silva Santisteban (1929–2006) was a Peruvian historian, anthropologist, and professor. He was born in Cajamarca in 1929 and died in Lima on December 16, 2006. He was married to singer Teresa Guedes, and was the father of Rocío Silva-Santisteban, poet and former President of Congress of Peru.

== Education and career ==
Silva attended school at the San Ramon Sesquicentennial School in Cajamarca (Promoción 1949). His professional training began at the National University of Trujillo, and later transferred to the Faculty of Arts at the National Major University of San Marcos. He obtained a PhD in History at twenty years of age in 1959 with a thesis entitled "The Obrajes in the Viceroyalty of Peru."

Between 1985 and 1987, he served as Director of the National Culture Institute and the National Museum of History. He was President of the American Committee on Culture of the OAS.

His penchant for the study of the Andean world marked most of his career, which earned him the friendship of the writer, José María Arguedas, with whom he developed a friendship.

== Death ==
He died on December 16, 2006; his remains were veiled in the Church of Our Lady of Fatima, in Miraflores, and then cremated, his ashes being scattered in the Santa Apolonia Hills near his hometown.

== Works ==
He published along with Román Sánchez Montes and Alberto Sánchez Caballero, three volumes of the History of Peru, which constitute a benchmark for research. January 1982.

- Los Obrajes en el Virreinato del Perú (English: The Obrajes in the Viceroyalty of Peru)
- Historia del Perú Prehispánico (English: History of Prehispanic Peru)
- El Pensamiento Mágico Religioso en el Perú Contemporáneo (English: Religious Magical Thinking in Contemporary Peru)
- La Idiosincrasia de Occidente (English: The idiosyncrasy of the West)
- Antropología: Conceptos y Nociones Generales (English: Anthropology: General Concepts and Notions)
- Historia de Nuestros Tiempos. (English: History of Our Times)
- Desarrollos políticos de la civilizaciones andinas (English: Political developments of the Andean civilizations)
- El primate responsable (English: The responsible primate), Fondo Editorial del Congreso de la República, Lima, 2005.

== Recognition and awards ==
- 1959 National Prize of Culture "Inca Garcilaso de la Vega."
- 1966 Magisterial Palms, Ministry of Education of Peru, in the Grade of Commander.
- 1967 Grand Order, Bolivarian Education.
- 1994 Magisterial Palms, Ministry of Education of Peru, in the Grade of Amauta.
