= Américo Gilvonio Conde =

Peruvian lawyer and former MRTA member

Américo Gilvonio Conde (died 2012), also known as "Juan Carlos" or "Johnny", was a Peruvian lawyer and former member of the Túpac Amaru Revolutionary Movement (MRTA).

== Biography ==
Gilvonio served under Hugo Avellaneda Valdez as part of the group's international wing. By the early 1990s, he was the group's number three, directly under Néstor Cerpa Cartolini and Miguel Rincón Rincón.

He was captured in Breña by DIRCOTE on June 22, 1993, as part of an operation codenamed "Cuervo 3". At the time, he was considered responsible for the group's legal wing, finances and special forces, also overseeing a number of kidnappings—such as that of Héctor Delgado Parker on October 4, 1989—and killings, such as that of General López-Albujar in 1990.

He was sentenced to 20 years in prison, but was released on probation after serving three-quarters of his sentence on May 15, 2009, although without having paid a civil reparation fee. He died three years later, in 2012, without having paid his S/. 10,000 fee.

== Personal life ==
Gilvonio's siblings, Dionisio Raúl and Nancy were also members of the MRTA. His son, Abel, is the founder of Hijos de Perú, an association formed in 2005 by the children of MRTA members.

== See also ==
- Néstor Cerpa Cartolini
- Miguel Rincón Rincón
