= Karate at the 2022 World Games – Men's kumite 67 kg =

Men's kumite 67 kg at the 2022 World Games
- Venue: Bill Battle Coliseum
- Location: Birmingham, United States
- Dates: 8 July
- Competitors: 8 from 8 nations

Medalists
gold medal	Vinícius Figueira	Brazil
silver medal	Yves Martial Tadissi	Hungary
bronze medal	Dionysios Xenos	Greece

The men's kumite 67 kg competition in karate at the 2022 World Games took place on 8 July 2022 at the Bill Battle Coliseum in Birmingham, United States.

== Results ==
=== Elimination round ===
==== Pool A ====
Pos	Athlete	B	W	D	L	Pts	Score	(Italy)	(Hungary)	(Chile)	(United States)
1	Luca Maresca (ITA)	3	3	0	0	6	11–1	—	1–0	1–0	9–1
2	Yves Martial Tadissi (HUN)	3	2	0	1	4	7–5	0–1	—	6–4	1–0
3	Camilo Velozo (CHI)	3	1	0	2	2	5–7	0–1	4–6	—	1–0
4	Josue Hernandez (USA)	3	0	0	3	0	1–11	1–9	0–1	0–1	—

Source: Birmingham 2022

==== Pool B ====
Pos	Athlete	B	W	D	L	Pts	Score	(Greece)	(Brazil)	(Japan)	(North Macedonia)
1	Dionysios Xenos (GRE)	3	2	1	0	5	7–0	—	0–0	1–0	6–0
2	Vinícius Figueira (BRA)	3	1	2	0	4	4–0	0–0	—	0–0	4–0
3	Soichiro Nakano (JPN)	3	1	1	1	3	4–1	0–1	0–0	—	4–0
4	Emil Pavlov (MKD)	3	0	0	3	0	0–14	0–6	0–4	0–4	—

Source: Birmingham 2022

=== Finals ===
Semi-finals
Luca Maresca (ITA)	0
Vinícius Figueira (BRA)	1
Dionysios Xenos (GRE)	0
Yves Martial Tadissi (HUN)	3

Gold medal bout
Vinícius Figueira (BRA)	4
Yves Martial Tadissi (HUN)	0
Bronze medal bout
Luca Maresca (ITA)	0
Dionysios Xenos (GRE)	1
