= Broad Front (Peru) =

Broad Front for Justice, Life and Liberty Frente Amplio por Justicia, Vida y Libertad
- Abbreviation: FA
- Leader: Marco Arana
- Founded: 21 June 2013; 13 years ago
- Membership (2020): 4,196
- Ideology: Socialism; Democratic socialism Progressivism
- Political position: Left-wing
- Colors: Green, Red
- Congress: 0 / 130
- Governorships: 0 / 25
- Regional Councillors: 4 / 274
- Province Mayorships: 0 / 196
- District Mayorships: 0 / 1,874

Election symbol

Website
- www.frenteamplioperu.pe

The Broad Front for Justice, Life and Liberty (Spanish: Frente Amplio por Justicia, Vida y Libertad), or simply Broad Front (Spanish: Frente Amplio), was a major political coalition of parties, political organizations, social movements and activist citizens of Peru whose main objective is to consolidate the different leftist, progressive, socialist and communist sectors.

It was founded in June 2013. It had its origin in the Encounter of Social and Political Organizations held in 2007 and its initial objective was to promote the defense of the territories. It has been part of the Congress of the Republic since 2012 as part of the Popular Action-Frente Amplio parliamentary group, and since 2016 with its own bench. During the Parliamentary Interregno after the dissolution of the Congress it has two members in the Permanent Assembly.

In the general elections of 2016, the party participated by running Verónika Mendoza as a presidential candidate. In the elections, held on April 10, the party became the third largest political force in the country, obtaining its first parliamentary minority in the Congress of the Republic. In the 2016-2021 Parliamentary Period, before the dissolution of the Congress, it obtained 20 congressional seats. In July 2017, the bench was divided and 10 of the 20 congressmen created the New Peru party.

== History ==
=== Background ===
A group of leaders of the Northern Macroregion of the country proposed in mid-2008 to develop meetings to promote an initiative of political organization, following the reflections of Marco Arana and the conclusions reached by the social movements participating in the First Meeting of Social Organizations and Policies, which took place in 2007.

In the context of the Amazon indigenous movement in August 2008 and the political polarization of the country, driven by the policy of the government of Alan García in the ancestral territories of the Amazonian indigenous people in favor of the transactional groups, the urgency of building an alternative was recognized. Renewal policy incorporating programmatic reflection on the plurinational state and this proposal gained strength.

Thus, in the last quarter of 2008, Marco Arana convened meetings of social leaders and environmental defenders of Piura, Lambayeque and Cajamarca, held in Eten-Lambayeque; and among the participants that were later founders of Tierra y Libertad were: Marco Arana, Wilfredo Pajares, Nicanor Alvarado, Julio Castro Castro, Marlene Castillo and Juan Vilela.

At these meetings, the need for a national political organization was discussed and the possibility of creating local or regional political platforms to allow representatives of the social movement to participate in the elections of municipal and regional authorities, as part of the defense of their territories. The leaders came from different ideological currents, with and without previous partisan political experience, concluding that "none of these currents is sufficient separately for the construction of a proposal for deep democratization in the country."

At the beginning of 2009, several meetings were held in the city of Lima at the request of Marco Arana, with intellectuals linked to the socialist party that came supporting the struggles, who considered it very difficult to create a new political party. In the north and in the south, more social and political leaders were visited, obtaining more adhesions, especially from roaming leaders; In Cusco, the accession of decentralist leaders was achieved. Finally, the acceptance of various nuclei was achieved to discuss the possibility of creating a new political organization.

To that end, the Plenary was held on April 18 and 19, 2009, bringing together 39 leaders from the interior of the country and from Lima; and after extensive debates they agreed to constitute a national political organization, preliminary called “Our Land”, and whose agreement by consensus was to achieve the registration of this political organization in the JNE and participate in national, regional and local electoral processes.

The second agreement they reached was to form the Transitional National Political Commission - CPNT and entrust them with the generation of proposals for Principles, Programmatic, Statutory Proposals towards the Foundational Congress, as well as the task of signing campaign for registration.

=== Land and Freedom: Political Movement ===
The first option of name was that of "Our Land", the word "land" being an unquestionable and consensus component and defining green as its emblematic color. But this denomination was observed, since it existed in the records of the National Office of Electoral Processes (ONPE). In view of this, the CPNT decided to adopt the denomination “Land and Freedom” ratifying the significance of the mother earth / territory and assuming a motto of ancient tradition of struggle and that is how it is formally constituted before the JNE as a political movement in 2009.

After that, the same year the Earth and Freedom Manifesto - a document of a principled nature - was disseminated to summon to be part of the new political organization. Likewise, the logo proposed at the First National Meeting of Land and Freedom Delegates, held on October 17 and 18 and where a total of 111 delegates from 17 regions with regional driving groups were discussed and agreed upon mostly.

In this Meeting, the Land and Freedom Tactic was presented, debated and approved, within the framework of a broad debate on the political and electoral situation. Then, the informative and deliberative session on the Electoral Registration Plan, ending with the agreements on the tasks towards political consolidation and registration for the Foundation Congress. The symbol of the Political Party "Land and Freedom" would be registered in the Foundation Act in February 2010.

=== Land and Freedom: Political Party ===
One year after the constitution as a Political Movement Earth and Freedom, the Foundational Congress “The Fair: the People Ahead” was held in the city of Lima from April 23 to 25, 2010, whose motto was: For Life and Dignity : Earth and Freedom!

In this Congress the central documents were debated, improved and approved, reaching foundational agreements that sustained the leap from political movement to political party. 215 full accredited delegates participated and four regions concentrated 61% of the full: Lima Metropolitan, Cusco, Cajamarca and Puno.

The inauguration was attended by dozens of leaders and leaders of various leftist groups, as well as various popular organizations such as CGTP, CONACAMI, CCP, CNA, Central of Household Workers and Youth Collectives.

Plenary sessions and work commissions were held on 24 and 25; and taking into account the edited proposals, the central partisan documents were improved and approved, such as the Ideario and Principles, the National Program and the Statute, which establishes that the Party “is an open, inclusive and non-denominational political organization that seeks Contribute to the democratization of society, the economy and the political system throughout Peru.

On April 25, the election of national leaders was held for the period 2010-2013. In a democratic and fraternal way, under the leadership of the National Electoral Committee (CENA), the members of the National Court of Ethics, the National Secretariat of Ethics and the new National Political Commission were elected.

=== Foundation ===
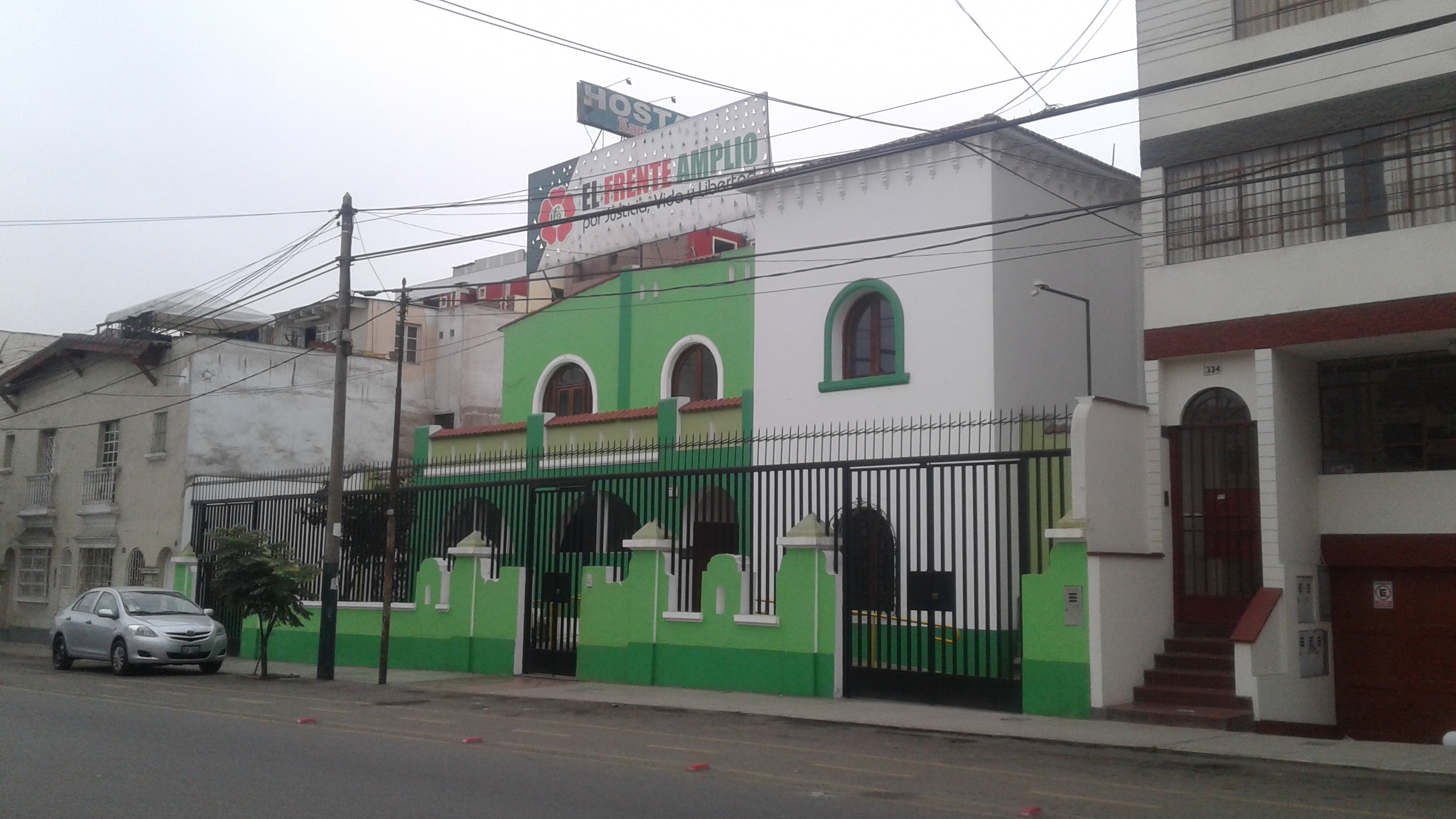
Local of the Frente Amplio party located in the Lince district in Lima - Peru.

The Frente Amplio was founded on June 21, 2013. grouping the following political groups: Citizens for Change, the Social Affirmation Movement (MAS), Land and Freedom, Social Force, Peruvian Communist Party and the Socialist Party. A few months after the front was founded, the Tierra y Libertad party, which had a current electoral registry, at the request of the other groups that did not want to compete with its name, changes its name provisionally and inscribes the name of "Frente Amplio" adding "by Life, Justice and Freedom "registering the logo of the flower of the song that identified the FA.

Subsequently, Tierra y Libertad offered its electoral registry for other groups to participate in terms of equity in the electoral process. In this process, one of its leaders, Marco Arana, nominated as a pre-candidate for the presidential candidacy along with Verónika Mendoza of the Sembrar Movement, resulting in the open citizen elections winning Mendoza.

Marco Arana Zegarra, leader of Tierra y Libertad, said that the Frente Amplio would be open to other political center organizations, with the exception of those engaged in acts of corruption.

Sowing Movement

=== Parliamentary bench 2012 - 2016 ===
The Popular Action - Frente Amplio parliamentary group was formed in July 2012 with five acciopopulist congressmen and five other congressmen without party registration after Acción Popular ended its Parliamentary Alliance with two other Peruvian political parties (Possible Peru and We are Peru), three political movements Regional and four independent congressmen.

In this way, the Popular Action Bench was first officially formed with the five acciopopulist congressmen and the congressman of the regional political movement Facts and No Words. Next, four of the five independent dissident congressmen from Peru Wins. These new additions were born the parliamentary group (or Bank) Acción Popular - Frente Amplio. Having modified the regulations of the Congress in June 2016, which now allows the formation of a parliamentary group with up to five congressmen, Popular Action that has that number of representatives, formed a separate group. The Broad Front for Justice, Life and Freedom did the same with its twenty representatives.

Members

The Popular Action - Frente Amplio parliamentary group consisted of:

Constituency	Seats	Elected congressmen	Party
Cajamarca	1	Mesías Antonio Guevara Amasifuén	Acción Popular
Cusco	1	Verónika Fanny Mendoza Frisch	Frente Amplio
Huánuco	1	Alejandro Yovera	Hechos y No Palabras
Lima Metropolitana	4	Víctor Andrés García Belaúnde	Acción Popular
Lima Metropolitana	4	Yonhy Lescano Ancieta	Acción Popular
Lima Metropolitana	4	Manuel Enrique Ernesto Dammert Ego Aguirre (Note: Dammert entered the replacement of the deceased Javier Diez Canseco.)	Frente Amplio
Lima Metropolitana	4	Rosa Mavila	Frente Amplio
Tumbes	1	Manuel Arturo Merino de Lama	Acción Popular

=== 2016 General Elections ===
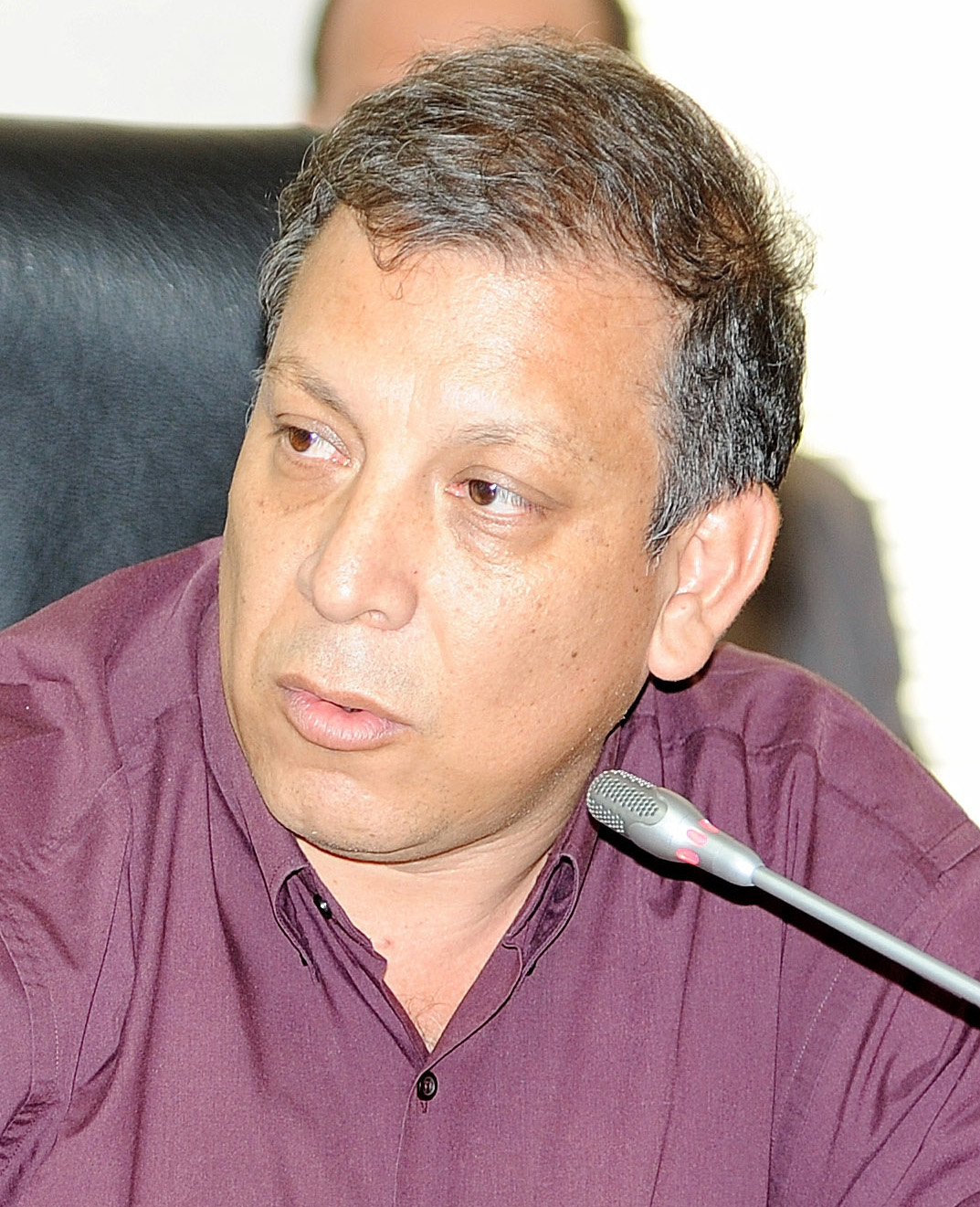
Marco Arana, leader and spokesperson of the parliamentary bench of the Frente Amplio.

In the general elections of 2016, the party nominated Verónika Mendoza as presidential candidate, as first vice president nominated Marco Arana and as second vice president nominated Alan Fairlie, the party was the third party with the intention of voting and obtained the first minority in the Congress of the Republic.

In July 2017, the bench was divided and 10 of the 20 congressmen (Alberto Quintanilla, Tania Pariona, Richard Arce, Mario Canzio, Manuel Dammert, Marisa Glave, Indira Huilca, Edgar Ochoa, Oracio Pacori and Horacio Zeballos) created the New Peru bench officially recognized by the Congress of the Republic in September 2017.

Original members:

Constituency	Seats	Elected congressmen	Votes
Áncash	1	María Elena Foronda Farro	9 094
Apurímac	1	Richard Arce Cáceres	10 076
Arequipa	2	Horacio Zeballos Patrón	24 368
Arequipa	2	Justiniano Rómulo Apaza Ordóñez	19 562
Ayacucho	2	Edyson Humberto Morales Ramírez	16 756
Ayacucho	2	Tania Edith Pariona Tarqui	11 842
Cajamarca	1	Marco Antonio Arana Zegarra	8 576
Cusco	2	Wilbert Gabriel Rozas Beltrán	23 771
Cusco	2	Edgar Américo Ochoa Pezo	19 661
Huancavelica	1	Zacarías Reymundo Lara Inga	8 278
Huánuco	1	Rogelio Robert Tucto Castillo	9 331
Junín	1	Mario José Canzio Álvarez	14 653
Lima Metropolitana	3	Marisa Glave Remy	97 529
Lima Metropolitana	3	Manuel Enrique Ernesto Dammert Ego-Aguirre	53 913
Lima Metropolitana	3	Indira Huilca	27 906
Piura	1	Hernando Ismael Cevallos Flores	15 244
Puno	3	Alberto Eugenio Quintanilla Chacón	55 218
Puno	3	Oracio Ángel Pacori Mamani	22 011
Puno	3	Edilberto Curro López	12 628
Tacna	1	Jorge Andrés Castro Bravo	23 341

=== Government of Pedro Pablo Kuczynski ===
During the government of Pedro Pablo Kuczynski, the Broad Front bench was the first minority in the Congress of the Republic. On August 17, 2017 the congressmen of Popular Force presented a motion of interpellation against the Minister of Education Marilú Martens, the Front Broad voted in favor of interpellation. The minister answered a list of 40 questions, mainly about the teachers' strike that still persisted. on September 14, 2017, the President of the Council of Ministers Fernando Zavala presented a question of trust to Congress, the Front Broad vote against the issue of trust and was rejected by the Congress of the Republic. Pedro Pablo Kuczinskyi swore in a new ministerial cabinet, the vote of confidence was held on October 12, 2017, Frente Amplio voted against, however the issue of trust was accepted. In November 2017, the Lava Jato Commission of Congress, chaired by Rosa Bartra and who was investigating the implications in Peru of the corruption network of the Odebrecht organization, received confidential information that President Kuczynski had had labor ties with that company, dating back to the time in that was minister of State between 2004 and 2006, for this reason the Broad Front presented the motion for the vacancy request to be debated in the plenary of the Congress. The congressmen of Fuerza Popular, Apra and Alianza para el Progreso joined the request and that is how they passed more than the 26 signatures needed to proceed with the process. Approved the motion, the debate began at 4:38PM on December 15 and lasted until 10 at night. Thus, the vacancy request was approved, the Congress agreed that on Thursday, December 21, at 9 am, Kuczynski should appear before the plenary session of the Congress to carry out his discharges. The Frente Broad vote in favor of the vacancy, without However, it did not prosper by not reaching the two thirds required for approval. On December 24, 2017, President PPK granted the humanitarian pardon to Alberto Fujimori, who had been imprisoned for 12 years, with a 25-year sentence for crimes of human rights violations (La Cantuta and Barrios Altos cases). Only days after the first presidential vacancy attempt, in January 2018, the Frente Amplio bank raised a new vacancy request, with the cause of pardon Alberto Fujimori, which allegedly had been negotiated and granted illegally. This did not prosper, given the lack of support from Fuerza Popular, whose votes were necessary to carry out an initiative like that. Under that experience, the leftist banks of Frente Amplio and Nuevo Peru promoted another motion for vacancy, focusing exclusively on the Odebrecht case, arguing that new evidence of corruption and conflict of interests on the part of PPK had been discovered when he was Minister of State in the Alejandro Toledo's government. This time they did get the support of Fuerza Popular, as well as other banks such as the Alliance for Progress (whose spokesperson, César Villanueva, was the main promoter of the initiative), thus bringing together the 27 minimally necessary votes to present a multiparty motion before the Congress of the Republic, which was done on March 8, 2018. On March 15, the admission of said motion to the plenary session of the Congress was submitted, the result being 87 votes in favor, 15 votes against and 15 abstentions. The motion was supported by all the banks, with the exception of Peruvians by the Kambio and ungrouped congressmen, including the three former officers and the Kenji Fujimori bloc.The Board of Spokesmen scheduled the debate on the request for a presidential vacancy for Thursday, March 22. Days before the vote on the presidential vacancy, a set of audios were broadcast, in which the Minister of Transportation and Communications is heard, Bruno Giuffra offer Mamani works in exchange for his vote to avoid the vacancy. The press highlighted a phrase by Giuffra in which he says: "Compadre, you know what the nut is like and what you are going to get," presumably referring to the benefits that Mamani would get if he voted against the vacancy. Before the foreseeable scenario that awaited him in the debate scheduled for the Congress on the 22nd, PPK chose to resign from the presidency of the Republic, sending the respective letter to the Congress, and giving a televised message to the Nation, which was transmitted to both of them and forty in the afternoon on March 21, 2018.

==== Fracción interna, Nuevo Perú ====
New Peru, parliamentary group emerged by the resignation of 10 congressmen from the Frente Amplio.

On July 10, 2017, there was the separation of 10 congressmen from the Frente Amplio bench and on July 26, New Peru appointed its coordinators and representatives to the Board of Speakers of the Congress for the 2017-2018 period: Alberto Quintanilla, coordinator of the parliamentary bloc and Tania Pariona in charge of alternate coordination.

In September 2017, when the so-called "anti-fugitive law" was declared unconstitutional in the Congress of the Republic, the New Peru Parliamentary Group formed by the congressmen Alberto Quintanilla, Tania Pariona, Richard Arce, Mario Canzio, Manuel Dammert, Marisa Glave was officially recognized, Indira Huilca, Edgar Ochoa, Oracio Pacori and Horacio Zeballos.

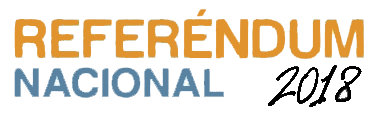
During the 2018 Constitutional Referendum, the Frente Amplio supported the null vote.

=== Government of Martín Vizcarra ===
After the resignation of Pedro Pablo Kuczynski to the Presidency of the Republic, he swore in as President Martín Vizcarra Cornejo following the line of constitutional succession. On July 28, 2018, President Martín Vizcarra proposed a national referendum to approve four constitutional changes aimed at eradicating corruption in the country. These measures were intended to modify the Peruvian Political Constitution to reform the National Council of the Magistracy, regulate the financing of electoral campaigns, prohibit the re-election of parliamentarians and restore the bicameral system at the congress. On September 14, 2018, the Justice Commission of the Congress did not approve the reform project of the National Council of the Magistracy due to the abstention of the 9 members of the Fujimorist group.Two days later, President Vizcarra in a message to the nation commented that despite having passed 40 days since to present the constitutional reform projects, in Congress none of them had been approved yet, so he had decided to formulate through his Prime Minister César Villanueva a question of trust focused on the approval of the reforms. The Front Broad voted against the issue of trust, however, the government finally got e The vote of confidence on the part of the Congress and in the following days, a parliamentary commission votes one by one the proposals of the already possible referendum. During the Electoral Campaign prior to the 2018 constitutional referendum, the Frente Amplio supported the null vote. On November 15, 2018 Alan García went to the house of Carlos Alejandro Barros, the Uruguayan ambassador, where he remained until December 3, 2018 (days before the National Referendum), when Tabaré Vázquez, president of that country, announced the rejection of the asylum request of Alan García; days before the announcement of Tabaré Vázquez a group of MPs from the Frente Amplio traveled to Uruguay to explain that Alan García was not a persecuted politician. On April 17, 2019, the former president of Peru Alan García committed suicide in the bedroom of his personal home when national police officers had gone to arrest him on a preliminary basis for matters related to the Odebrecht case. The Frente Amplio said that the García's death "is a family tragedy and that pain must be respected and not politically manipulated to try to prevent or obstruct the action of justice." On May 29, 2019, from the Great Hall of Government Palace, the President Vizcarra gave a message to the Nation, in which he announced his decision to raise the issue of trust before Congress in support of political reform. On June 4, 2019, Salvador del Solar appeared at the Plenary Session to present and request the issue of trust before the national representation. The members of the Frente Amplio bench voted against. On July 28, President Vizcarra addressed his message to the nation on the occasion of National Holidays; In this, he announced the presentation of a constitutional reform bill to advance the elections from 2021 to April 2020. On September 26 the Constitution commission discussed the project, the Frente Amplio withdrew from the vote in the form of protest, however, the Commission decided to file the executive project. Coinciding with the discussion about the draft of the elections and the request for habeas corpus in favor of Keiko Fujimori before the Constitutional Court (TC), in September 2019, Fujimori and its allies of Congress hastened the selection process of the magistrates of that court. On Friday, September 27, 2019, at one o'clock in the afternoon, President Vizcarra gave a message to the Nation in which he announced that he would present to the Congress a question of trust aimed at suspending the process of election of the judges of the Constitutional Court (TC) and modify the mechanism for said election, hours later, Prime Minister Salvador del Solar came to Congress to present a document addressed to Pedro Olaechea, asking him to request a question of confidence in the Parliament's election Judges of the TC. On the morning of September 30 Del Solar and his council of ministers arrived at the Congress and waited in the ambassadors' room to be received in plenary. Unusual, when they headed for the hemicycle, they found the doors locked. The Fujimori and their allies had decided not to let them in, despite the fact that the ministers can participate in the sessions of the plenary of the congress, according to article 129 of the Constitution. Meanwhile, in the plenary session, the Frente Amplio bank along with New Peru, United for the Republic and the Liberal Bank had presented an agenda motion, which proposed leaving the election of magistrates of the TC and put as the only agenda item of the plenary session of that day the issue of trust that the Executive was going to request. The document was signed by lawmakers Indira Huilca Flores (New Peru), Patricia Donayre (United for the Republic), Hernando Cevallos (Frente Amplio) and Gino Costa (Liberal Bank), although in the request for a question of trust presented by Del Solar included the suspension of the election process initiated a week ago (in addition to the approval of a new mechanism for said election), the majority of Congress decided to carry out the election. The first TC candidate to be voted on was Gonzalo Ortiz de Zevallos Olaechea (cousin of the president of Congress), the Frente Amplio voted against, however, he was elected. Then he tried to choose another candidate, but did not reach the necessary 87 votes. Then, the session was suspended. In the afternoon, the plenary of the Congress of the Republic met again and, as they had announced, they began the debate to decide whether or not to grant the trust to the Executive. When at 5 pm and 25 pm it was announced that President Vizcarra began to issue his Message to the Nation, the congressmen hurried the vote, approving the issue of trust to the Executive with 50 votes. 31 voted against and there were 13 abstentions. The Broad Front was in favor of the dissolution of the Congress of the Republic.

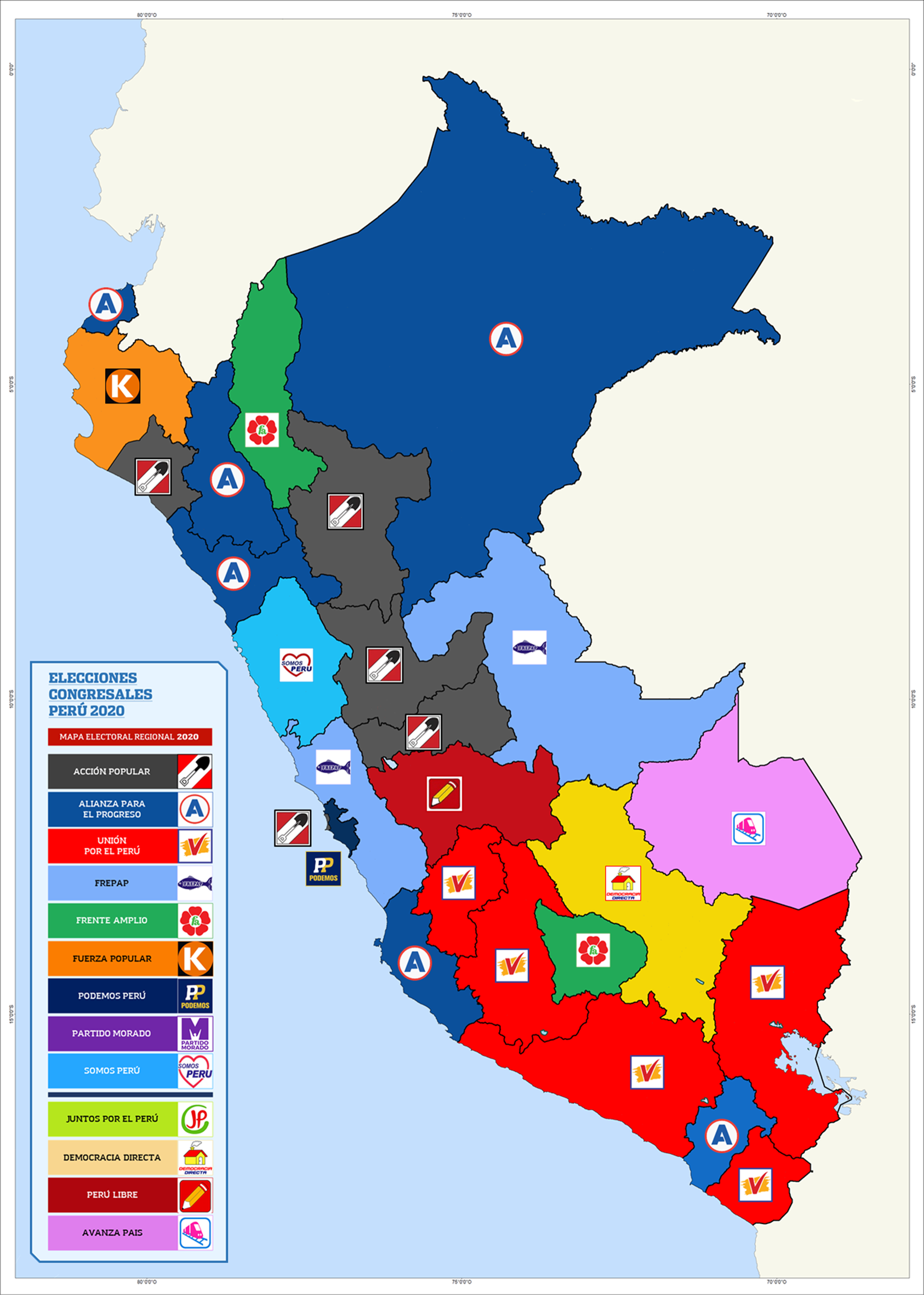
Most voted political parties in the congressional snap elections of 2020, the Frente Amplio obtained the plurality of votes in the departments of Amazonas and Apurímac

==== 2020 congressional snap elections ====
In the congressional snap elections of 2020 the party presented candidates in 25 of the 26 electoral districts of the country. The party obtained the plurality of votes in the department of Amazonas with 20.52% of the votes and in the department of Apurímac with 18.16% of the votes.

Constituency	Seats	Elected congressmen	Votos
Amazonas	1	Absalón Montoya Guivin	
Apurímac	1	Lenin Abraham Checco Chauca	
Arequipa	1	José Luis Ancalle Gutiérrez	
Cajamarca	1	Mirtha Esther Vásquez Chuquilin	
La Libertad	1	Lenin Fernando Bazán Villanueva	
Lima Metropolitana	3	Enrique Fernández Chacón	
Lima Metropolitana	3	Cindy Arlette Contreras Bautista	
Lima Metropolitana	3	Rocío Silva Santisteban Manrique	
Puno	1	Yvan Quispe Apaza	

== Members of the Broad Front ==
Partido	Main Ideology	Leader
Sowing Movement (Movimiento Sembrar)	Autonomism	
Tierra y Libertad (Land and Liberty)	Ecosocialism	Marco Arana Zegarra
National Progressive Coordination (Coordinación Nacional Progresista)	Maoism	Armida Huerta
July 19 Liberation Movement (Movimiento de Liberación 19 de Julio)	Marxism–Leninism	
Student Integration (Integración Estudiantil)	Marxism	
UNÍOS	Trotskyism	Enrique Fernández Chacón
Green World (Mundo Verde)	Ecosocialism	Martina Portocarrero
Unitary Confederation of Workers of Peru (Confederación Unitaria de Trabajadores del Perú)	Syndicalism	Julio César Bazán

== Ideology ==
The Broad Front is positioned in an environmentalist and reformist policy with a social democratic orientation. It seeks to implement a policy of transparency, allow citizens to participate in politics through participatory democracy, and decentralize political, fiscal, and administrative powers.

It advocates establishing an ecological commitment by generalizing renewable energy throughout the country and protecting the country's biodiversity from human activities, including a policy of reforestation, the fight against deforestation and illegal exploitation.

At the economic level, the party seeks to prohibit monopolies and oligopolies in the country's economy, giving priority to a pluralistic and social market economy, regulated by the State. It also wants to develop local production, improve support for small and medium-sized enterprises, give more protection to unions and improve working conditions in the country.

Faced with poverty, the party wants to increase minimum wages and pensions. He is in favor of a significant investment in education so that all children can go to school. The party proposes a social plan to eradicate inequalities, especially to improve women's rights, as well as an anti-racist policy to ensure that the country achieves the required human rights objectives.

The party wants to guarantee the protection of indigenous peoples and empower them in certain regions of the country, and it is also in favor of a revision of free trade agreements, as well as better cooperation among South American states.

== Election results ==
=== Presidential election ===
Year	Candidate	Coalition	Votes	Percentage	Outcome
2016	Verónika Mendoza	Frente Amplio por Justicia, Vida y Libertad	2 874 940	18.74	3rd
2021	Marco Arana	Frente Amplio por Justicia, Vida y Libertad	63,940	0.45	16th

=== Elections to the Congress of the Republic ===
Year	Votes	%	Seats	▲/▼	Position
2016	1 700 052	14.0%	20 / 130	▲20	Minority
2020	911 701	6.2%	9 / 130	▼11	Minority
2021	135 104	1.05%	0 / 130	▼9	Extra-parliamentary

=== Regional and municipal elections ===
Year	Governorships	Regional Councillors	Province Mayorships	District Mayorships
Year	Outcome	Outcome	Outcome	Outcome
2018	0 / 25	7 / 274	2 / 196	29 / 1,874

== Notes ==
1. Dammert entered the replacement of the deceased Javier Diez Canseco.
