= Camilo Velozo =

Chilean karateka (born 1996)

Camilo Velozo Zúñiga
Personal information
- Full name: Camilo Esteban Velozo Zúñiga
- Born: 2 February 1996 (age 30)

Sport
- Country: Chile
- Sport: Karate
- Weight class: 67 kg
- Event: Kumite
Medal record
Men's karate
Representing Chile
World Championships
Bronze medal – third place	2018 Madrid	Kumite 67 kg
Pan American Games
Silver medal – second place	2019 Lima	Kumite 67 kg
Bronze medal – third place	2023 Santiago	Kumite 67 kg
South American Games
Silver medal – second place	2022 Asunción	Kumite 67 kg
Bronze medal – third place	2018 Cochabamba	Kumite 67 kg

Camilo Esteban Velozo Zúñiga (born 2 February 1996) is a Chilean karateka. He won one of the bronze medals in the men's kumite 67 kg event at the 2018 World Karate Championships held in Madrid, Spain. At the 2019 Pan American Games held in Lima, Peru, he won the silver medal in the men's kumite 67 kg event.

In 2021, Velozo competed at the World Olympic Qualification Tournament held in Paris, France hoping to qualify for the 2020 Summer Olympics in Tokyo, Japan. He was eliminated in his third match by Sultan Al-Zahrani of Saudi Arabia.

Velozo competed in the men's kumite 67 kg event at the 2022 World Games held in Birmingham, United States. He won the silver medal in his event at the 2022 South American Games held in Asunción, Paraguay.

== Achievements ==
Year	Competition	Venue	Rank	Event
2018	South American Games	Cochabamba, Bolivia	3rd	Kumite 67 kg
2018	World Championships	Madrid, Spain	3rd	Kumite 67 kg
2019	Pan American Games	Lima, Peru	2nd	Kumite 67 kg
2023	Pan American Games	Santiago de Chile, Chile	2nd	Kumite 67 kg
2022	South American Games	Asunción, Paraguay	2nd	Kumite 67 kg
2023	Pan American Games	Santiago, Chile	3rd	Kumite 67 kg
