= 2018 World Karate Championships – Men's 67 kg =

Karate competition

Men's 67kg at the 2018 World Karate Championships
- Location: Madrid, Spain
- Dates: 6-10 November

Medalists
gold medal	Steven Da Costa	France
silver medal	Vinícius Figueira	Brazil
bronze medal	Camilo Velozo	Chile
bronze medal	Hamoon Derafshipour	Iran

The preliminaries and repechages of the Men's 67kg competition at the 2018 World Karate Championships were held on November 7, 2018, and the finals on November 10, 2018.

== Results ==
=== Finals ===
Semi-finals
(Chile) Camilo Velozo	1
(Brazil) Vinícius Figueira	3
(France) Steven Da Costa	2
(Iran) Hamoon Derafshipour	0

Final
(Brazil) Vinícius Figueira	5
(France) Steven Da Costa	6

=== Repechage ===
Preliminary repechage fight

	Score	
Jess Rosiello (Belgium)	2–0	(Poland) Milosz Sabiecki

Repechage round 2
(Belgium) Jess Rosiello	3*
(Hungary) Yves Martial Tadissi	3
(Dominican Republic) Deivis Ferreras	0
(Morocco) Ayoub Zakaria	3

Repechage round 3
(Belgium) Jess Rosiello	0
(Egypt) Ali Elsawy	1
(Morocco) Ayoub Zakaria	3
(Spain) Raul Cuerva Mora	4

Repechage round 4
(Egypt) Ali Elsawy	2
(Jordan) Abdelrahman Al-Masatfa	7
(Spain) Raul Cuerva Mora	5
(Cameroon) William Stevens Rolle	3

Bronze medals
(Jordan) Abdelrahman Al-Masatfa	2
(Chile) Camilo Velozo	2*
(Spain) Raul Cuerva Mora	3
(Iran) Hamoon Derafshipour	6

=== Pool A ===
Preliminary round fights

	Score	
Camilo Velozo (Chile)	0*–0	(Kuwait) Mousa Hassan
Dean Hollowood (Australia)	1–0	(Peru) Andhi Avila
Jani Karkkulainen (Finland)	2–3	(United Arab Emirates) Ahmed Alhadharim
Stefan Pokorny (Austria)	1–3	(Belarus) Artsiom Krautsou
Walid Limam (Tunisia)	0–8	(Colombia) José Ramírez
Hnat Pak (Ukraine)	1–2	(Japan) Hiroto Shinohara

First round
(Chile) Camilo Velozo	0*
(Yemen) Adnan Shaif	0
(Australia) Dean Hollowood	0
(Chinese Taipei) Pan Po-shen	5
(United Arab Emirates) Ahmed Alhadharim	0
(Saudi Arabia) Fahad Alkhathami	4
(Greece) Nikolaos Gidakos	4
(Zimbabwe) Ali Nyoni	0
(Belarus) Artsiom Krautsou	0
(Kazakhstan) Assylbek Muratov	5
(Colombia) José Ramírez	1
(Palestine) Motaz Daraghma	0
(Japan) Hiroto Shinohara	1
(Slovenia) Denis Gorenc	0
(Serbia) Stefan Joksic	1
(Venezuela) Andres Delgado	0

Second round
(Chile) Camilo Velozo	1
(Chinese Taipei) Pan Po-shen	0
(Saudi Arabia) Fahad Alkhathami	2
(Greece) Nikolaos Gidakos	1
(Kazakhstan) Assylbek Muratov	0
(Colombia) José Ramírez	0*
(Japan) Hiroto Shinohara	0
(Serbia) Stefan Joksic	1

Third round
(Chile) Camilo Velozo	4*
(Saudi Arabia) Fahad Alkhathami	4
(Colombia) José Ramírez	5*
(Serbia) Stefan Joksic	5

Quarterfinals
(Chile) Camilo Velozo	8
(Colombia) José Ramírez	5

=== Pool B ===
Preliminary round fights

	Score	
Daniel Rodionov (Estonia)	2–3	(Bosnia and Herzegovina) Faruk Sijercic
Ikboljon Uzakov (Uzbekistan)	1–0	(Albania) Xhino Toli
Christos Ioannides (Cyprus)	2–7	(Guatemala) Christian Wever Gordillo
Ali Elsawy (Egypt)	6–2	(Switzerland) Salim Tawfik
Gelin Garcia Akondzo (Republic of the Congo)	1–3	(Republic of Ireland) Rory Kavanagh
Vinícius Figueira (Brazil)	1–0	(Belgium) Jess Rosiello

First round
(Bosnia and Herzegovina) Faruk Sijercic	0
(China) Wang Zhiwei	2
(Uzbekistan) Ikboljon Uzakov	2
(North Macedonia) David Petkov	1
(Guatemala) Christian Wever Gordillo	0
(Jordan) Abdelrahman Al-Masatfa	8
(Mexico) Jesus Leonardo Rodriguez	0
(Latvia) Nikolajs Bodrovs	6
(Egypt) Ali Elsawy	5
(Portugal) Joaquim Mendes	0
(Republic of Ireland) Rory Kavanagh	0
(Italy) Luca Maresca	9
(Brazil) Vinícius Figueira	2
(Poland) Milosz Sabiecki	0
(South Africa) Adeeb Fillies	0
(Hungary) Yves Martial Tadissi	2

Second round
(China) Wang Zhiwei	0
(Uzbekistan) Ikboljon Uzakov	0*
(Jordan) Abdelrahman Al-Masatfa	9
(Latvia) Nikolajs Bodrovs	4
(Egypt) Ali Elsawy	1
(Italy) Luca Maresca	0
(Brazil) Vinícius Figueira	4
(Hungary) Yves Martial Tadissi	0

Third round
(Uzbekistan) Ikboljon Uzakov	4
(Jordan) Abdelrahman Al-Masatfa	5
(Egypt) Ali Elsawy	1
(Brazil) Vinícius Figueira	2

Quarterfinals
(Jordan) Abdelrahman Al-Masatfa	0
(Brazil) Vinícius Figueira	1

=== Pool C ===
Preliminary round fights

	Score	
Amir Khani Refugee Karate Team	4–0	(Curaçao) Jolano Lindelauf
Ylli Cenaj (Kosovo)	0*–0	(Armenia) Sergey Dallakyan
Bernice Brice Sawadogo (Burkina Faso)	0–4	(Thailand) Supa Ngamphuengphit
Brian Mertel (United States)	0–2	(Spain) Raul Cuerva Mora
Tomas Balcius (Lithuania)	1–0	(Sweden) Elliot Narkiniemi
Ayoub Zakaria (Morocco)	6–2	(Montenegro) Mario Hodžić

First round
Refugee Karate Team; Amir Khani	2
(Cuba) Maikel Noriega	3
(Kosovo) Ylli Cenaj	1
(Oman) Ahmed Al-Suleimani	4
(Thailand) Supa Ngamphuengphit	3
(Cameroon) William Stevens Rolle	6
(Senegal) Papa François Diouf	3
(Argentina) Francisco Nievas	3*
(Spain) Raul Cuerva Mora	3
(Iceland) Mani Karl Gudmundsson	2
(Lithuania) Tomas Balcius	0
(Tajikistan) Qamariddin Hasanov	0*
(Morocco) Ayoub Zakaria	WO
(Angola) Mavulanga Moyo Pinto
(Dominican Republic) Deivis Ferreras	0
(France) Steven Da Costa	1

Second round
(Cuba) Maikel Noriega	2
(Oman) Ahmed Al-Suleimani	0
(Cameroon) William Stevens Rolle	2
(Argentina) Francisco Nievas	1
(Spain) Raul Cuerva Mora	1
(Tajikistan) Qamariddin Hasanov	0
(Morocco) Ayoub Zakaria	0
(France) Steven Da Costa	2

Third round
(Cuba) Maikel Noriega	0
(Cameroon) William Stevens Rolle	4
(Spain) Raul Cuerva Mora	2
(France) Steven Da Costa	3

Quarterfinals
(Cameroon) William Stevens Rolle	2
(France) Steven Da Costa	3

=== Pool D ===
Preliminary round fights

	Score	
Luis Diego Castro (Costa Rica)	0–4	(Canada) Ryan O'Neil
Mohamed Faycal Bouakel (Algeria)	7–1	(Romania) Claudiu Teodorescu
Adam El Shafei (Scotland)	2–6	(Russia) Magomedrasul Murtazaliev
Matej Homola (Slovakia)	0–3	(India) Pranay Sharma
Lucas Busk-Matthiasen (Denmark)	2*–2	(Croatia) Dino Povrzenic

First round
(Canada) Ryan O'Neil	0
(Iran) Hamoon Derafshipour	1
(Algeria) Mohamed Faycal Bouakel	1
(Panama) Alberto Galvez	3
(Russia) Magomedrasul Murtazaliev	3
(Hong Kong) Chun Hei Cheung	3*
(Germany) David Kuhn	4
(Bulgaria) Veselin Dimitrov	0
(India) Pranay Sharma	0
(South Korea) Lee Ji-hwan	3
(New Zealand) Barney Gill	0
(Georgia (country)) Davit Pataridze	4
(Denmark) Lucas Busk-Matthiasen	0
(Azerbaijan) Rafiz Hasanov	4
(Turkey) Burak Uygur	1
(England) Jordan Thomas	0

Second round
(Iran) Hamoon Derafshipour	0*
(Panama) Alberto Galvez	0
(Hong Kong) Chun Hei Cheung	0
(Germany) David Kuhn	5
(South Korea) Lee Ji-hwan	1
(Georgia (country)) Davit Pataridze	2
(Azerbaijan) Rafiz Hasanov	2
(Turkey) Burak Uygur	1

Third round
(Iran) Hamoon Derafshipour	0*
(Germany) David Kuhn	0
(Georgia (country)) Davit Pataridze	0
(Azerbaijan) Rafiz Hasanov	1

Quarterfinals
(Iran) Hamoon Derafshipour	3
(Azerbaijan) Rafiz Hasanov	1
