= Marco Arana =

Peruvian educator, politician and sociologist (born 1962)

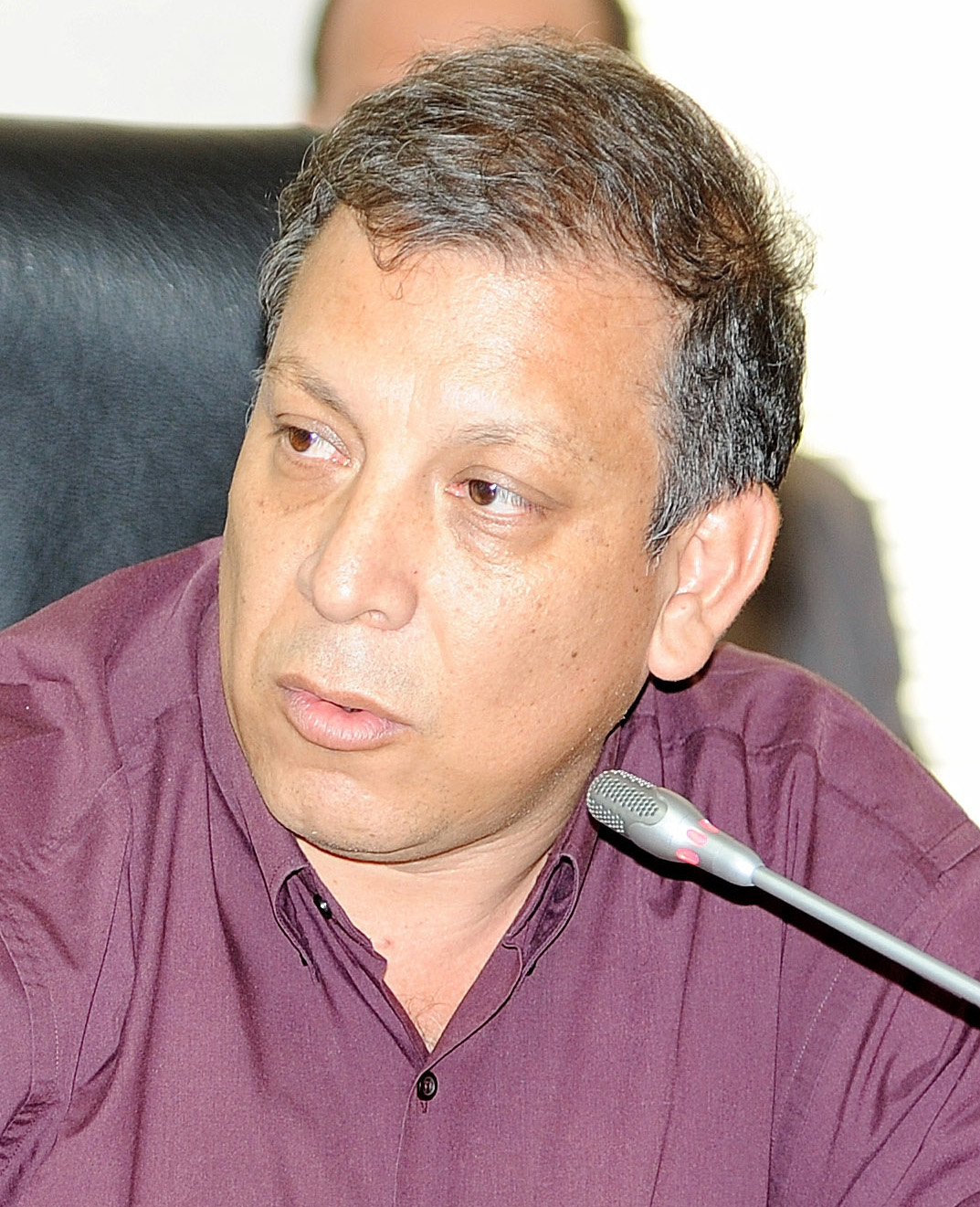
- Arana in 2016

President of Broad Front
- Incumbent
- Assumed office 21 June 2013
- Preceded by: Office established

Member of Congress
- In office 26 July 2016 – 30 September 2019
- Constituency: Cajamarca

Personal details
- Born: 20 October 1962 (age 63) Cajamarca, Peru
- Party: Broad Front
- Education: National University of Cajamarca

Marco Antonio Arana Zegarra (born October 20, 1962) is a Peruvian politician, sociologist, professor and former priest, founder and activist of the Tierra y Libertad Movement. He ran unsuccessfully for President in the 2021 elections, placing 16th.

== Biography ==
Arana was born on October 20, 1962, in Cajamarca, to two teachers and the second of four siblings. His mother, Alcina Zegarra, a native of Pataz in La Libertad, was a teacher in a mining camp; and his father, César Arana, was born in Cajamarca where he worked as a teacher in the rural area.

He studied primary education at the Marist Brothers school in Cajamarca and secondary school at the Antonio Guillermo Urrelo Experimental School. From a very young age he participated in the Christian youth communities, developing social work activities.

In 1979, at the age of 17, he entered the San José de Cajamarca Major Seminary and, in turn, began his sociology studies at the National University of Cajamarca, specializing in the area of rural development. He also took philosophy courses.

In 1985, he arrived in Lima to continue his seminary studies and in 1989 he finished his theology studies at the Juan XXIII Superior Institute of Theological Studies. During this period he settled in the district of San Juan de Lurigancho and in 1990 he was finally ordained a diocesan priest.

In 1994, he had the opportunity to travel to Rome to study theology at the Pontifical Gregorian University, from which he graduated with honors.

He completed a master's degree in Sociology (1997-1998) specializing in Management and Public Policy at the Pontifical Catholic University of Peru thanks to a scholarship from the Belgian Interuniversity Council. His thesis was the first in Peru on socio-environmental conflicts, which allowed him to graduate with honors again.

The following year (1999) he followed a diploma on water and sanitation at the Faculty of Engineering of the National University of Cajamarca.

In 2002, he traveled to the United States to complement his academic training with a diploma in Social Management from the Inter-American Institute for Social Development in Washington.

== Environmental activism ==
In 1985, he was invited to Hualgayoc, the district where Cajamarca's oldest mines operate, to create a documentary video on mining and its impact on agriculture. There, he witnessed the unsafe conditions under which adults and children worked in the mines, descending up to a thousand meters below sea level without helmets or shoes.

Five years later, after being ordained a priest, he established a parish soup kitchen program in Porcón. The initiative later expanded to include nutrition courses, childcare, and deworming days. With community support, he founded the Cristo Ramos de Porcón School, providing quality secondary education for young people with limited resources.

In 1993, with the help of the Episcopal Center for Social Action, he denounced the expropriation of peasant lands by the Newmont and Buenaventura mining company, whose North American officials finally accepted their responsibility and paid compensation to those affected.

In 1999, he formed EcoVida, the first ecological organization in Peru, together with young activists, biologists, sociologists and educators from the National University of Cajamarca. With this organization they carried out various initiatives, such as the "Campaign to save the San Lucas River" and the "Awareness raising on the burning of plastic."

Another of the initiatives that he developed was the creation of brigades of environmental educators, which had the support of the Franciscan Sisters and whose objective was to help the population in the formation of bio-gardens and in the installation of improved kitchens.

In 2002, he created the Training and Intervention Group for Sustainable Development (GRUFIDES) together with activists who focused on the problem of communities, human rights and ecological rights.

In 2003, with GRUFIDES, it carried out the Rural Roads to Fight Poverty project, which included six studies on roads in areas of extreme poverty, in addition to the project "Development of capacities for the resolution of environmental conflicts", with which they won a distinction from the Sierra y Democracia program.

At the beginning of 2011, Stephanie Boyd's documentary "Operation Diablo", in which Marco Arana participated, received the International Human Rights Film Award from the Berlin International Film Festival. It shows the difficult relationship with mining companies.

== Political career ==
=== Tierra y Libertad movement ===
In April 2009, Arana founded the Tierra y Libertad Movement, an environmentalist and leftist organization. In February 2010, he was suspended as a priest and decided to focus exclusively on his political career ahead of Peru's 2011 general elections. At the time, his party lacked electoral registration and aimed to form a broad alliance of progressive parties and social movements, with Arana proposed as a presidential candidate. However, his candidacy lacked sufficient voter support, leading him to temporarily withdraw.

After nearly three years of collecting signatures, Arana successfully registered the Tierra y Dignidad political party with the National Elections Jury in April 2012. He then worked with other parties to establish a Broad Front ahead of the 2016 elections. In October 2015, he ran in his party's primary elections for the presidency, securing second place behind Cusco congresswoman Verónika Mendoza. The ticket ultimately finished third, falling short of qualifying for the runoff.

=== Congressman ===
In the 2016 general elections, the Broad Front became the first minority in parliament and Arana was elected Congressman. In these elections the alliance led by Verónika Mendoza obtains 20 representatives in the National Congress.

In July 2017, after a year of internal confrontations between the Arana and Mendoza factions, the Frente Amplio bench formalized its break. The group Nuevo Peru (supporters of Mendoza) indicates that "this is a way out in the face of wear and tear on the bench where there is no consensus and an adequate functioning with the participation of the 20 congressmen" and that they will not lose "one more minute in fights than they distract us from the problems of Peruvians » due to the discrepancies with the faction of Tierra y Libertad led by Marco Arana.

In an official letter sent by Nuevo Peru to Marco Arana, it reads: «The dialogue that you intend to initiate, after having excluded us more than two months ago from the decision-making of the parliamentary group, excluding from the meetings or failing to convene them, is a farce to which we are not going to lend ourselves.

The insurmountable nature of the political discrepancies between the sectors of Marco Arana and Veronika Mendoza were exposed in the first presidential vacancy process against Pedro Pablo Kuczynski, where the Broad Front, led by Marco Arana, voted en bloc in favor of the vacancy while that the congressmen of Nuevo Peru left the hemicycle seconds before the voting began. Marco Arana's position in this process was because "the vacancy is led by the president himself. (...) This president lied to his constituents, he hid his conflicts of interest from them ».
