= Callao Naval Base =

Main naval base of the Peruvian Navy

Coordinates: 12.033°S 77.139°W

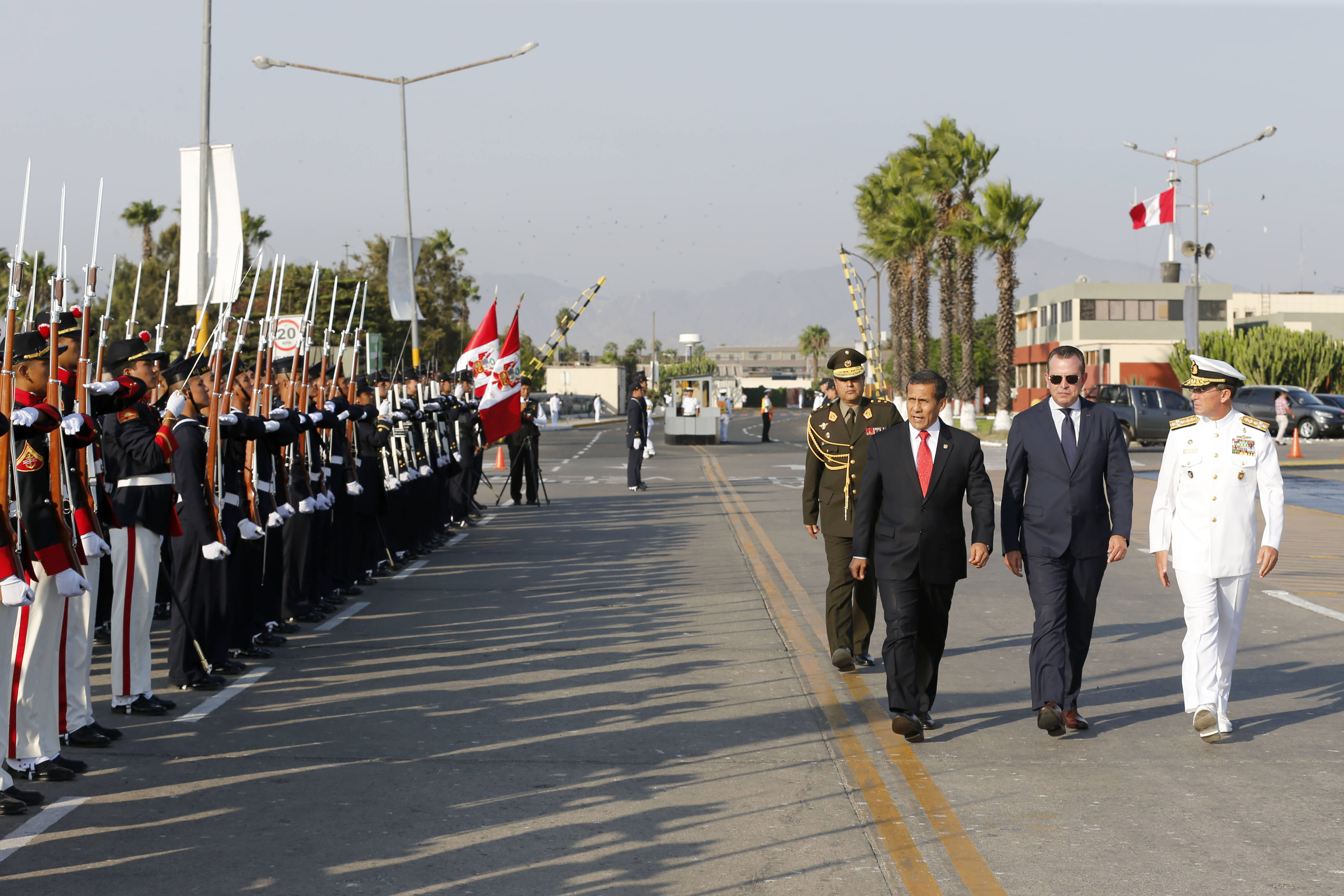
- President Ollanta Humala and Defence Minister Jakke Valakivi during a ceremony at the base in 2016

Site information
- Type: Naval base, prison
- Owner: Peruvian State
- Operator: National Penitentiary Institute, Peruvian Navy

Site history
- Built: 1930s

Garrison information
- Current commander: V.A. Jorge Millones Gonzales

Callao Naval Base (Spanish: Base Naval del Callao) is the main naval base of the Peruvian Navy. Located north of the main port of Callao, it is also a high-security prison, where members of terrorist groups such as the Shining Path and the Túpac Amaru Revolutionary Movement (MRTA) are located. The base hosts a dockyard and naval aviation base, as well as the Naval Medical Center, which contains the U.S. Navy's Naval Medical Research Unit Six.

== History ==
The naval base was first built in the 1930s as a levee and a naval arsenal. In 1992, then presidential advisor Vladimiro Montesinos proposed the construction of a penitentiary centre in the base, where he himself was confined after he was extradited from Venezuela in June 2001.

A project to modernize the base started in the northern part of the facility on June 21, 2023. In January 2026, the U.S. approved US$1.5 billion in equipment and services for the base.

== Notable inmates ==
- Abimael Guzmán, chairman of the Shining Path
- Víctor Polay Campos, co-founder of the MRTA
- Óscar Ramírez Durand, chairman of the Shining Path
- Vladimiro Montesinos (June 2001 – August 2021), former director of the National Intelligence Service
- Miguel Rincón Rincón, leader of the MRTA
- Wilmer Arrieta, member of a criminal organisation
- Florindo Eleuterio Flores Hala, member of the Shining Path

== See also ==
- Port of Callao
- Peruvian Naval School
