= Hamoon Derafshipour =

Iranian karateka (born 1992)

Personal information
- Born: September 22, 1992 (age 33) Kermanshah, Iran

Sport
- Country: Iran
- Sport: Karate
Medal record
Men's karate
Representing Iran
World Championships
Bronze medal – third place	2018 Madrid	Kumite 67 kg

Hamoon Derafshipour (Persian: هامون درفشی‌پور, born September 22, 1992, in Kermanshah, Iran) is an Iranian karateka. He qualified for the 2020 Summer Olympics in Tokyo, Japan, where karate was featured for the first time, as part of the Refugee Olympic Team. Derafshipour started practicing karate when he was 7 years old. He previously won a bronze medal in the Men's Individual -67 kg Kumite at the 2018 Senior World Karate Championships at Madrid, Spain and Two Asian Karate Championships titles, and several other medals, including three golds and three bronze in the World Karate Federation Karate1 Premier League Championship.

Hamoon currently lives in Canada with his wife after having left Iran for personal and security reasons.

On 11 February 2026, Derafshipour signed a letter to the World Karate Federation with prominent Iranian karateka demanding the suspension of the Islamic Republic of Iran Karate Federation, and permitting Iranian karateka to compete independently in international competitions, in response to the government's crackdown of the 2025–2026 Iranian protests.
