= Confederación Unitaria de Trabajadores del Perú =

National trade union center in Peru

CUT
- Confederación Unitaria de Trabajadores del Perú
- Founded: 1992
- Headquarters: Lima, Peru
- Location: Peru
- Members: 300,000
- Key people: Julio César Bazán, secretary general
- Affiliations: ITUC
- Website: https://cutperu.org.pe/

The Confederación Unitaria de Trabajadores del Perú (lit. 'Unitary Confederation of Workers of Peru' or 'Unitary Confederation of Peruvian Workers', CUT) is a national trade union center in Peru. It was founded in 1992 and has a membership of 300,000.

ICTUR reports that the CUT was active in the movement that led to Alberto Fujimori fleeing from office in 2000.

The CUT is affiliated with the International Trade Union Confederation.
