= National University of Cajamarca =

University in Peru

Coordinates: 7.1669°S 78.4954°W

- Universidad Nacional de Cajamarca
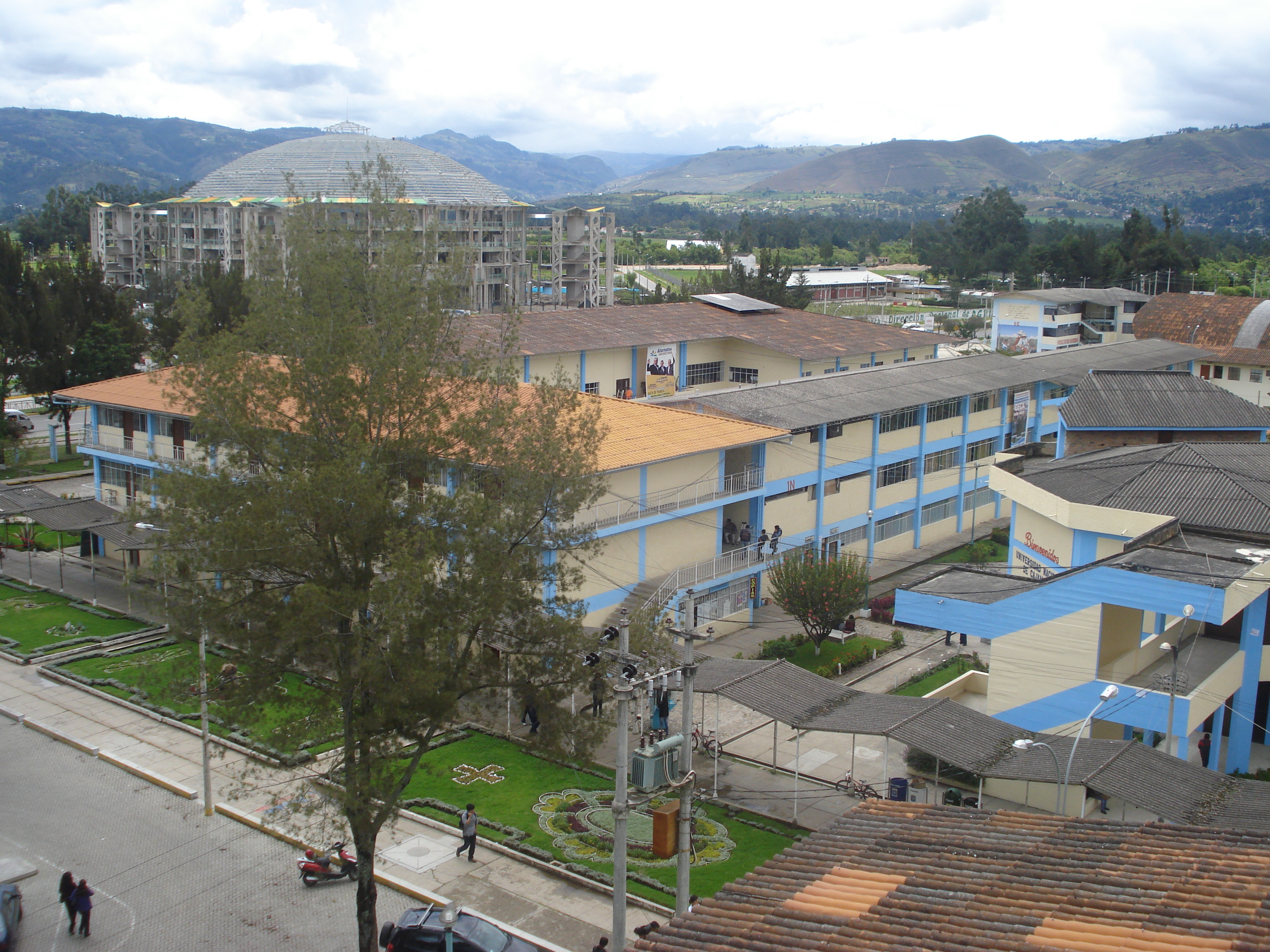
- Type: Public University
- Established: February 13, 1962
- Faculty: 1,000
- Students: 8,152
- Location: Cajamarca, Cajamarca, Peru
- Campus: 35 has
- Website: unc.edu.pe

The National University of Cajamarca (Spanish: Universidad Nacional de Cajamarca), or UNC for short, is a major public university located in Cajamarca, Peru; capital of the department of Cajamarca. The university was formally established on February 13, 1962, in accordance with a government decree.

UNC currently has approximately 8,152 students in ten different academic faculties, making it one of the largest universities in the north of the country. The current Headmaster is Carlos Tirado Soto.

== History ==
On February 13, 1962, Law No. 14015 was passed, establishing the Technical University of Cajamarca. The university officially started its operations on July 14, 1962, with the opening of six faculties: Rural Medicine, Agronomy, Veterinary Medicine, Pedagogy, Mining and Metallurgy, and Economics and Business Organization. This event culminated the efforts initiated by the Federation of Educators of Cajamarca in 1957. Led by Dr. Zoilo León Ordóñez, this group aimed to establish a higher education institution for the youth of Cajamarca. In 1961, they formed a pro-university committee, which received approval from the then-President of Peru, Dr. Manuel Prado Ugarteche.

== Faculties and schools ==
The National University of Cajamarca (UNC) comprises 10 faculties, which encompass 24 professional schools. These programs are categorized within the disciplines of sciences and humanities. Among these, the Faculty of Engineering holds the distinction of offering the highest number of degree programs.

Faculty	Professional School
Faculty of Biological Sciences	
Faculty of Education	
Faculty of Medicine	Human Medicine
Faculty of Social Sciences	
Faculty of Economical Sciences	Administration
Faculty of Economical Sciences	Economics
Faculty of Economical Sciences	Accountancy
Faculty of Law and Political Sciences	Law and Political Sciences
Faculty of Engineering	Geotechnical Engineering
Faculty of Engineering	Hydraulics Engineering
Faculty of Engineering	Civil Engineering
Faculty of Engineering	Sanitary Engineering
Faculty of Engineering	Systems Engineering
Mines Engineering
Faculty of Veterinary	Veterinary
Faculty of Agricultural Sciencies	Agronomía
Faculty of Zootechnics	Zootechnics

== Rectors ==
1. Ing. Jorge Navarro Talavera
2. Ing. Ciro Arribasplata Bazan
3. Ing. Guillermo Urteaga Rocha
4. M.V. José Raunelli Castro
5. Ing. Mariano Carranza Zarrav
6. Ing. Pablo Sánchez Zevallos
7. Ing. Letelier Mass Villaneuva
8. Prof. César Alipio Paredes Canto
9. Mg. Elio Leonicio Delgado Azañero
10. Dr. Angelmiro Montoya Mestanza (2004-2009)
11. M.Sc. Carlos Segundo Tirado Soto (2009-2014)
12. Dr. Hermes Roberto Mosquiera Ramirez (2014-2015)
13. Dr. Angelmiro Montoya Mestanza (2016-2021)(F.+2020)
14. Dr. Ángel Francisco Dávila Rojas (2021)
15. Dr. Bernardo Escalante Zumaeta (2021-2026)

== Academic rankings ==
University Rankings
National Rank
ARWU (2020)	—
Webometrics (2021)	60
URAP (2021)	—
SCImago (2020)	—
QS Mundial (2021)	—
THE Mundial (2021)	—

In recent years, international university rankings have gained prominence as tools for assessing the performance of universities both nationally and internationally. These rankings, academic in nature, classify institutions based on a bibliometric methodology that employs objective, measurable, and reproducible criteria. Factors considered in these evaluations include academic reputation, the employability of graduates, the number of research citations received by their repositories, and their web impact. Among the 92 accredited universities in Peru, the National University of Cajamarca has consistently been placed within the top thirty nationally in some international university rankings.

== See also ==
- Education in Peru
- List of Universities in Peru
- Cajamarca
- UTC
