= Miguel Rincón Rincón =

Peruvian Maoist revolutionary leader (1951–2024)

Personal details
- Born: Miguel Wenceslao Rincón Rincón; 8 May 1951 Chacas, Peru
- Died: 11 December 2024 (aged 73) Callao, Peru
- Party: Túpac Amaru Revolutionary Movement
- Occupation: Guerrilla leader
- Nickname: Comrade Francisco

Military service
- Rank: Commander
- Battles/wars: Terrorism
- Criminal information
- Status: Died in custody
- Convictions: Terrorism; Murder
- Penalty: 32 years in prison

Miguel Wenceslao Rincón Rincón (8 May 1951 – 11 December 2024), also known by his nom de guerre Comrade Francisco (Spanish: Camarada Francisco), was a Peruvian terrorist and one of the top leaders of the Tupac Amaru Revolutionary Movement (MRTA).

== Activity ==
Rincón was part of the Communist Party of Peru – Majority, being secretary of the Communist Youth. He unsuccessfully applied for the UDP to be a constituent for the elaboration of the 1979 constitution. In 1979 he met Néstor Cerpa Cartolini. In 1984 he joined the Tupac Amaru Revolutionary Movement (MRTA). He was part of the “America Battalion”. He was captured in 1989 in Lima. In 1990 he escaped from prison together with Víctor Polay Campos. After Polay Campos was recaptured in 1992, Rincón became the “number two” of the subversive organization. In 1994 he assumed the position of general commander of the MRTA Central Front.

Due to the capture of the most important members of MRTA and the announced peace agreement between Abimael Guzmán and the government, Rincón together with Néstor Cerpa Cartolini began to plan the “takeover” of Congress to kidnap congressmen and negotiate the release of the subversives. In 1994, Rincón became the commander general of the MRTA Central Front.

=== Capture ===
In 1995 he was recaptured after a long confrontation in a residence in La Molina along with 17 other MRTA terrorists, aborting the plan to “take” Congress. In his escape attempt, Rincón and other members of MRTA took a family hostage. He was sentenced to life imprisonment by faceless judges during the Fujimori regime. Subsequently, once democracy was reinstated, his sentence was modified to 32 years in prison. He has published several books, including one called Andean Socialism.

In 2023, he was investigated for perpetration-by-means and human rights violations in the case of the Tarapoto massacre.

Rincón died from cancer at the Callao Naval Base on December 11, 2024, at the age of 73.
