= Vinícius Figueira =

Brazilian karateka (born 1991)

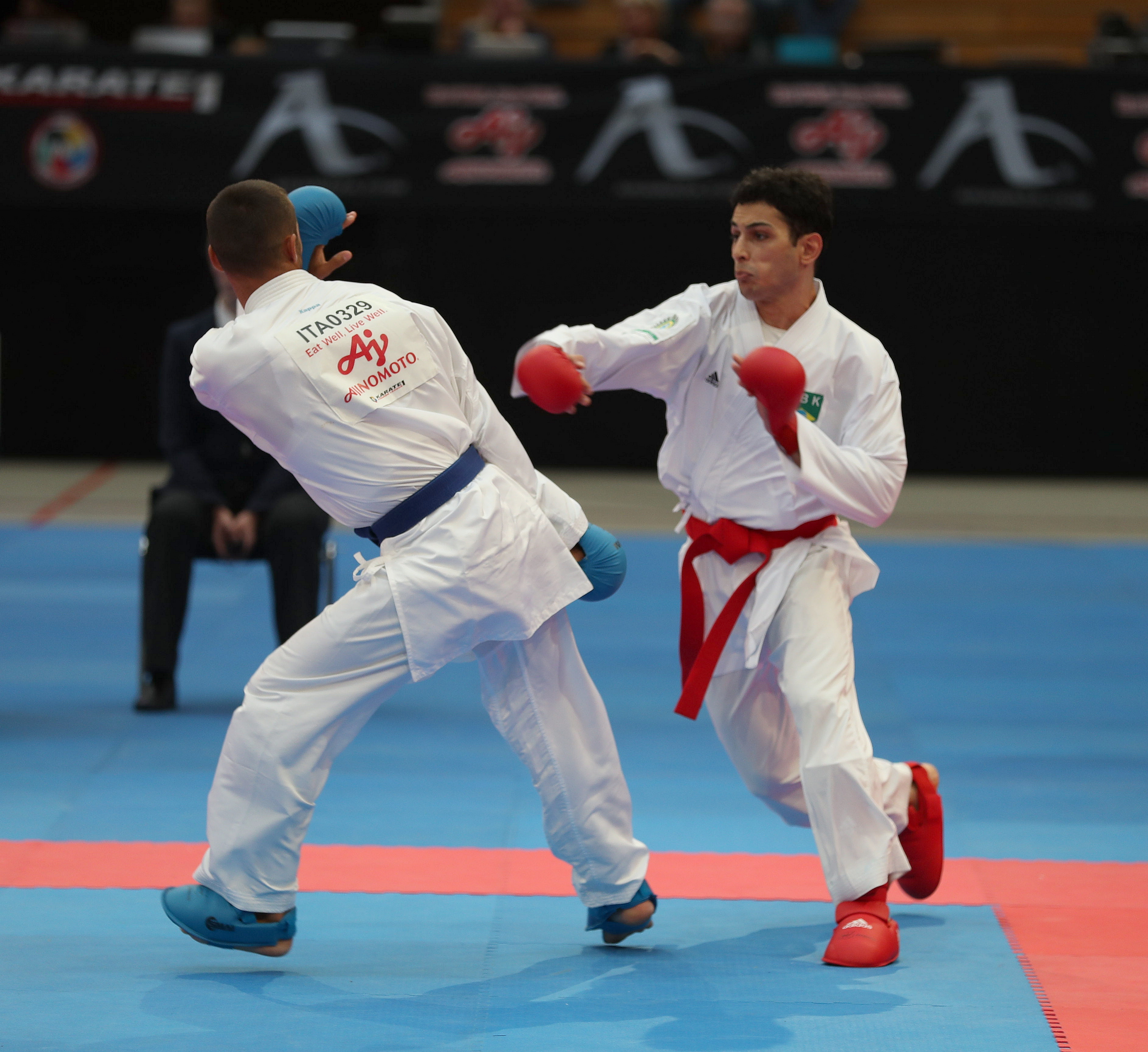
- Figueira (right) in 2018

Personal information
- Born: 15 April 1991 (age 35)

Sport
- Country: Brazil
- Sport: Karate
- Weight class: 67 kg
- Event: Kumite
Medal record
Men's karate
Representing Brazil
World Championships
Silver medal – second place	2018 Madrid	Kumite 67 kg
Bronze medal – third place	2014 Bremen	Kumite 67 kg
World Games
Gold medal – first place	2022 Birmingham	Kumite 67 kg
Pan American Games
Bronze medal – third place	2019 Lima	Kumite 67 kg
South American Games
Silver medal – second place	2018 Cochabamba	Kumite 67 kg

Vinícius Figueira (born 15 April 1991) is a Brazilian karateka. He won the silver medal in the men's kumite 67 kg event at the 2018 World Karate Championships held in Madrid, Spain.

== Career ==
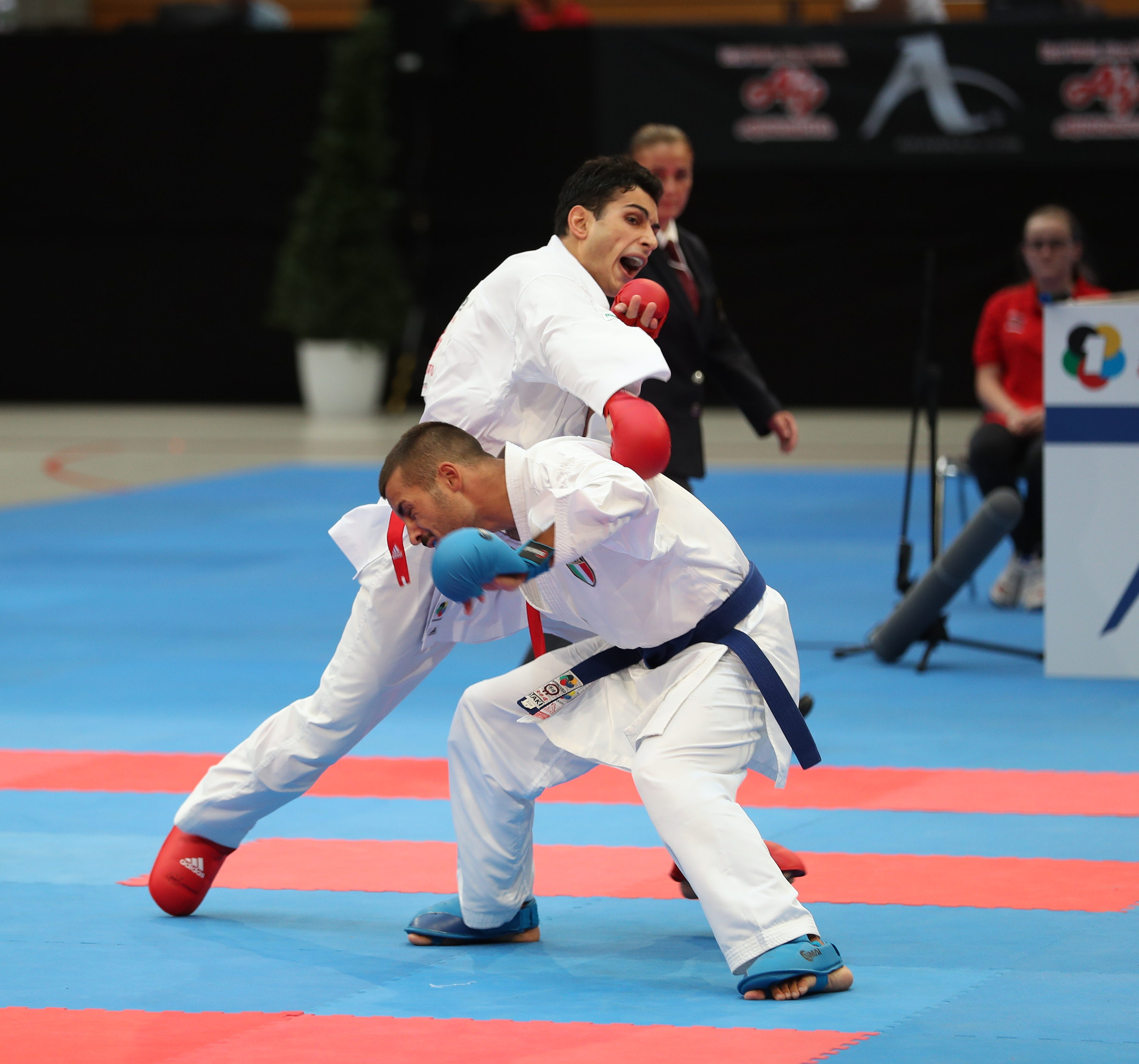
Vinícius Figueira at the Karate 1 Premier League 2018 in Berlin

In 2014, Figueira won one of the bronze medals in the men's kumite 67 kg event at the World Karate Championships held in Bremen, Germany.

At the 2019 Pan American Games held in Lima, Peru, he won one of the bronze medals in the men's kumite 67 kg event.

In March 2020, Figueira was scheduled to represent Brazil at the 2020 Summer Olympics in Tokyo, Japan in karate. This changed in March 2021 after the World Karate Federation revised the system for Olympic qualification. In June 2021, he failed to qualify at the World Olympic Qualification Tournament held in Paris, France for the 2020 Summer Olympics.

Figueira won the gold medal in the men's kumite 67 kg event at the 2022 World Games held in Birmingham, United States.

== Achievements ==
Year	Competition	Venue	Rank	Event
2014	World Championships	Bremen, Germany	3rd	Kumite 67 kg
2018	South American Games	Cochabamba, Bolivia	2nd	Kumite 67 kg
2018	World Championships	Madrid, Spain	2nd	Kumite 67 kg
2019	Pan American Games	Lima, Peru	3rd	Kumite 67 kg
2022	World Games	Birmingham, United States	1st	Kumite 67 kg
