= Marisa Glave =

Peruvian sociologist and politician

Marisa Glave Remy
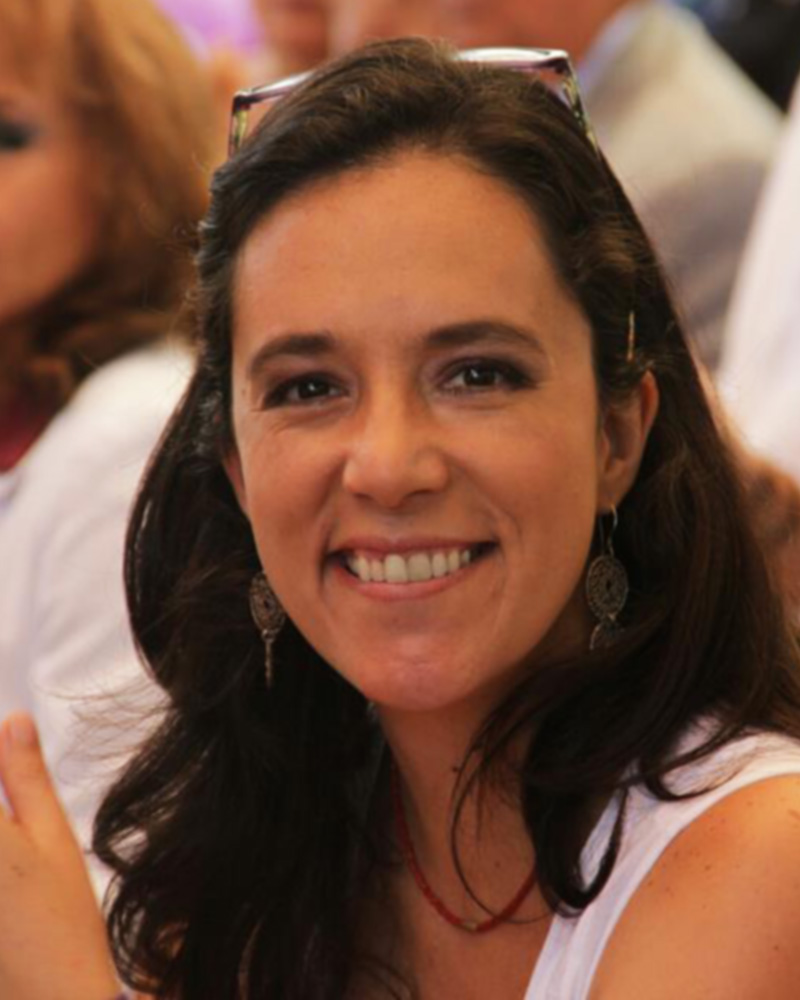
- Glave in the debate for the popular referendum, 2013.

Member of Congress
- In office July 26, 2016 – September 30, 2019
- Constituency: Lima

Lima City Councilwoman
- In office January 1, 2007 – April 19, 2013; Recall election

Personal details
- Born: May 16, 1981 (age 45) Lima, Peru
- Party: New Peru (2017–2019)
- Other political affiliations: Earth and Freedom – Broad Front (2010–2016)
- Education: Pontifical Catholic University of Peru; Autonomous University of Barcelona
- Occupation: Politician

Marisa Glave Remy (born May 16, 1981) is a Peruvian sociologist and politician. She served in the Peruvian Congress from 2016 to 2019. Previously, she was Lima City Councilwoman, and a founding member of the Earth and Freedom movement, currently named Broad Front for Justice, Liberty and Life.

Glave is noted as one of the most representative political figures of the Peruvian left-wing.

== Early life and career ==
Glave is the daughter of Luis Miguel Glave Testino and María Isabel Remy Simatovic. She completed her primary and secondary studies at the Colegio Sagrados Corazones Recoleta.

She holds a bachelor's degree in social sciences with a major in sociology from the Pontifical Catholic University of Peru. She pursued her master's degree in public policy management at the Continental University of Sciences and Engineering in partnership with the Autonomous University of Barcelona. Later she worked in research and consultancies in rural development, institutions and political organizations, social conflicts and citizen participation.

Glave was a member of the Coordinadora por la Democracia in 1999–2000 and president of the FEPUCP in 2002–2003, as well as a member of the Root Movement in 2003–2006 and part of the coordinating team of the meeting for the Peru Social Forum, and the Forum of the Solidarity Culture of Villa El Salvador in 2004–2007.

== Political career ==
In 2004, she assumed the position of regidor of the Metropolitan Municipality of Lima representing the Peruvian Nationalist Party. Between January and July 2010, she was the national coordinator of the Earth and Freedom Movement. Glave continued as mayor of Lima representing a coalition of Fuerza Social, Tierra y Libertad, New Left Movement and Lima para Todos, in the municipal elections of Lima in 2010. During her tenure she was president of the Urban Development Commission in the Metropolitan Municipality of Lima.

In the recall referendum held in March 2013, she was the spokesperson for the "No" campaign, against the recall of the mayor of Lima, Susana Villarán. Although the official results of this plebacite ensured the continuity of the mayor, it led to the loss of Glave's position, and that of 21 other council members.

== General Elections 2016 ==
Glave sought a mandate from Broad Front, winning a plurality of 4,388 votes on the parliamentary list for Lima.
