= Víctor Polay =

Peruvian convicted terrorist

Víctor Polay Campos

Leader of the Túpac Amaru Revolutionary Movement
- In office May 31, 1982 – June 9, 1992
- Succeeded by: Néstor Cerpa Cartolini

Personal details
- Born: April 6, 1951 (age 75) Callao, Peru
- Party: FDP (since 2000) Formerly: APRA (to 1973); MIR (1973–1980); FRAS (1980); ARI (1980); UDP (1980–1982); IU (1980–1982); MIR-EM–PSR-ML (1980–1982); Patria Libre (1980–1982)
- Education: National University of Callao; University of Paris; Complutense University of Madrid
- Nickname: Comrade Rolando

Víctor Alfredo Polay Campos (born 6 April 1951), also known as Comrade Rolando, is a Peruvian former sociologist and convicted terrorist. He was one of the founders of the Túpac Amaru Revolutionary Movement, a Marxist–Leninist militant organization, for which he was arrested in 1992. He has since been imprisoned at Callao Naval Base.

In 1997, the UN Human Rights Committee found that the circumstances of his trial and detention never violated his human rights. On 22 March 2006, he was found guilty by a Peruvian court on nearly 30 crimes committed during the late 1980s and early 1990s and was sentenced to 32 years imprisonment.

== Biography ==
He is the son of Víctor Polay Risco, a founding member of the Peruvian Aprista Party and a Freemason, and of Otilia Campos Bárcena, an Aprista militant. His grandfather, Po Leysen, was a Chinese-Peruvian who came to work on the sugarcane plantations of Trujillo. He completed his primary education at the San Antonio Marianista School in Callao. When he was in the 5th grade, he became an altar boy and wanted to become a seminarian, which led his parents to withdraw him from the Marianist school and take him to the Gran Unidad Escolar 2 de Mayo in Callao, where he completed secondary school. At age 7, he was part of the Peruvian Aprista Boys (CHAP), an APRA-affiliated organization in which his parents enrolled him amid the celebration of the release of Alfredo Tello and Héctor Pretell, who had been accused of participating in the assassination of Francisco Graña Garland.

During his five years of secondary school, he was a member of the Callao Scout Group No. 3 “David Livingstone.” He became an outstanding scout and leader of the Wolves Patrol, as noted by his fellow scout group member Marco Miyashiro (former head of DIRCOTE) on Jaime de Althaus’s program on Canal N. In his final years of secondary school, he was part of the Association of Student Journalists of Callao (APEC), a left-wing association, and he also met Father Alejandro Cussianovich, who would become his adviser.

=== Political activity ===
He belonged to the APRA youth wing. In 1967, he entered the newly created National Technical University of Callao (UNATEC). He was elected, on the Aprista student list, as secretary general of the Federated Center of Mechanical, Industrial, and Naval Engineering. In 1968, he was a member of the National Directorate of the Aprista University Command (CUA).

In March 1969, together with José Carrasco Távara (later Minister of Energy and Mines), he was sent by APRA to a seminar for young and mid-level left-wing leaders in Costa Rica, organized by the German Friedrich Ebert Foundation and the Center for Democratic Studies of Latin America (CEDAL), directed by Luis Alberto Monge, who would later become president of Costa Rica.

In 1969, he joined the APRA Conjunctions Bureau (a group of young members who worked daily and directly with Víctor Raúl Haya de la Torre) together with Alan García, Carlos Roca, César Vega Vega, Carlos Rivas Dávila, José Luis Pérez Sánchez-Cerro, Julián Alzamora, Alberto Valdivia, among others.

In 1972 he was detained for several months in Lurigancho Prison, accused in the police courts of carrying out subversive actions against the military government of Juan Velasco Alvarado using dynamite in Ica and Lima. During that time, Polay Campos came into contact with leaders and militants of the Revolutionary Left Movement (MIR) and other left-wing groups. His judicial process even included Víctor Raúl Haya de la Torre himself. After being released, he traveled to Spain in September to study sociology at the Complutense University of Madrid, where he shared an apartment with Alan García and went to work with him in Geneva for three months in 1973. During his stay in Europe, he left Aprista militancy. Thus, in Geneva he got in touch with Carlos Pongo, who connected him in Paris with Máximo Castro, a member of the MIR Central Committee; he also formed a group to study Capital by Karl Marx.

== Family ==
Polay was the son of Victor Polay-Risco, who was part of the founding generation of the Peruvian Aprista Party. Polay-Risco is half-Chinese; his father, Po Leysen, was a Chinese coolie who arrived to work in the Trujillo sugarcane plantations.

== Bibliography ==
- Walton Look Lai, Tan Chee-Beng (15 February 2010). The Chinese in Latin America and the Caribbean. Brill Academic Pub. ISBN 978-9004182134.
