= Presidency of José María Balcázar =

Peruvian presidential administration in 2026

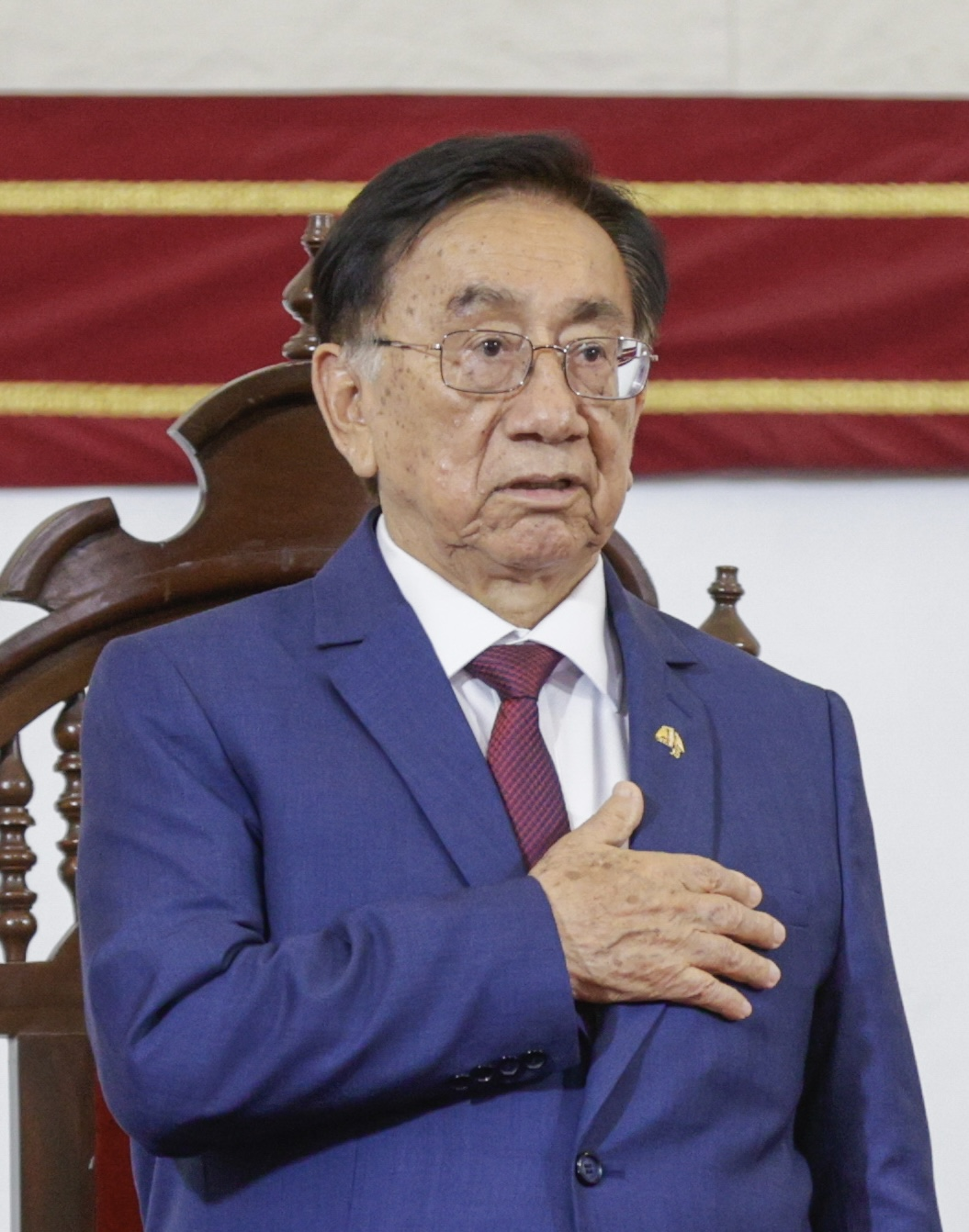
- Presidency of José María Balcázar; 18 February 2026 – 28 July 2026
- Prime Minister: Ernesto Álvarez Miranda; Denisse Miralles; Luis Arroyo Sánchez
- Cabinet: See list
- Party: Indepedent
- Election: 2021
- Seat: Government Palace (Peru)

The presidency of José María Balcázar in Peru began on February 18, 2026, after his swearing-in as President of the Republic by constitutional succession, in his capacity as President of Congress, following the impeachment of José Jerí from the presidency.

== Assumption of office ==
=== Overview ===
Balcázar was designated by an internal vote of the Congress of the Republic, in which he received 60 votes in the second round against María del Carmen Alva, and was sworn in as President of the Republic by constitutional succession, in his capacity as President of Congress, in order to complete the 2021–2026 term. He is the eighth Peruvian president in less than a decade, the fourth Peruvian president in less than five years, and the oldest president the country has had at the time of assuming office (83 years).

=== Election ===
On 17 February 2026, the Congress of the Republic removed José Jerí from the positions of president of Congress and president of the Republic, which was approved through a congressional vote of 75 votes in favor and 24 against. In response, Congress had to proceed with the election of an interim president in the country until the holding of the 2026 general elections. In this regard, Parliament carried out a vote to elect a new president due to the refusal of Fernando Rospigliosi to assume the office.

On 18 February 2026, Balcázar was elected president of the Congress of the Republic of Peru, thereby assuming the interim presidency of the Republic. The election featured two candidacies: congresswoman María del Carmen Alva, who was a member of Popular Action, and Balcázar Zelada himself. As such, his candidacy was originally presented by left-wing congressman Guido Bellido (former member of Podemos Perú), and was subsequently backed by the Free Peru caucus (Balcázar's own party). After proceeding with the vote count, Balcázar Zelada obtained 64 votes in a second round, while congresswoman Alva obtained 46 votes.

Although the vote was private, according to the Lima newspapers El Comercio and Perú 21, Balcázar's victory would have had the backing of the Alliance for Progress and We Are Peru caucuses, both categorized as aligned with the political right.

Likewise, the conservative right-wing parties Popular Renewal and Popular Force mutually accused each other of having secretly voted for Balcázar in the context of Jerí's removal.

=== Oath of office ===
On February 17, 2026, the Congress of the Republic unanimously declared the censure of then-President José Jerí. Following the impeachment process, Parliament held a vote to elect a new president, due to Fernando Rospigliosi's refusal to assume the office.

He was sworn in at 10:30 p.m. (Peruvian time) and assumed the presidency of the Republic according to the line of succession, becoming the fourth president of the 2021–2026 term and the eighth since 2016.

During his brief inaugural address, he stated:

"Governing a country is not difficult; let's bring together the most insightful people. Why fight? It's a matter of will. I will come every day, if possible, to talk; without dialogue, there is nothing."

In addition, he recalled Socrates, Plato, Marcus Aurelius, Alexander the Great and Mao Zedong, and spoke about chapters and remembrances from both the national history and world history.

Balcázar announced that he would evaluate the performance of all ministers and did not rule out making changes to the cabinet (no official document regarding this announcement was issued, beyond journalistic reports without direct binding effect for Balcázar).

Prime Minister Ernesto Álvarez Miranda confirmed that the ministers from Jerí's dissolved cabinet remain in office. In addition, he met with congressmen from the Free Peru party (among them Waldemar Cerrón) and from Podemos Perú. He also met with Julio Velarde (the president of the Central Reserve Bank of Peru), Bernie Navarro (the United States ambassador to Peru), César Briceño (the chief of the Joint Command of the Armed Forces) and Óscar Arriola (the chief of police). The leader of Free Peru, Vladimir Cerrón, asked Balcázar through his X account to remove Arriola from the police position, due to his status as a fugitive from justice. For Cerrón, Balcázar's government represented the "symbolic recovery of the government" by Free Peru after the fall of Pedro Castillo during his attempted self-coup.

== Cabinet ==
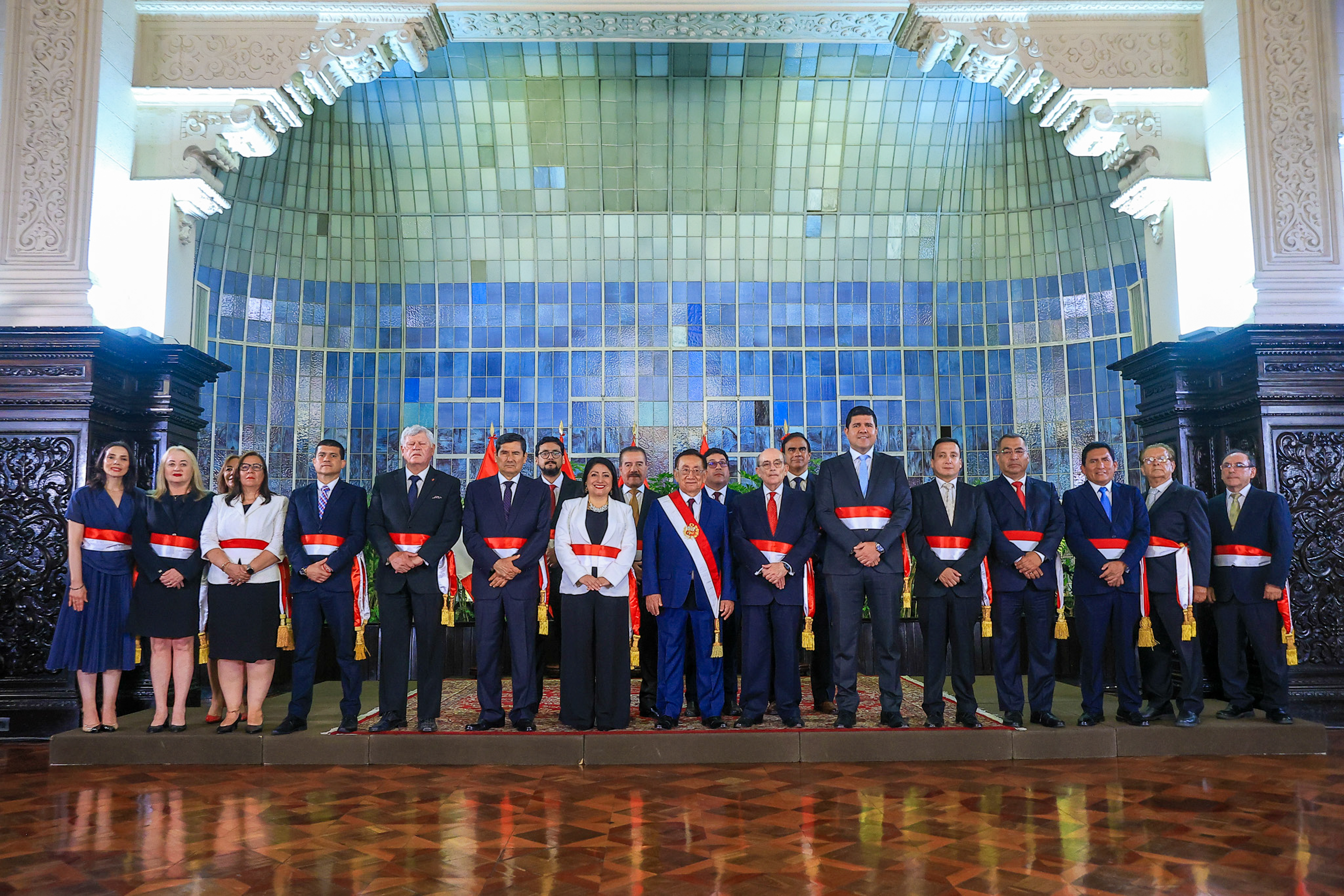
Balcázar and his first cabinet, led by Denisse Miralles

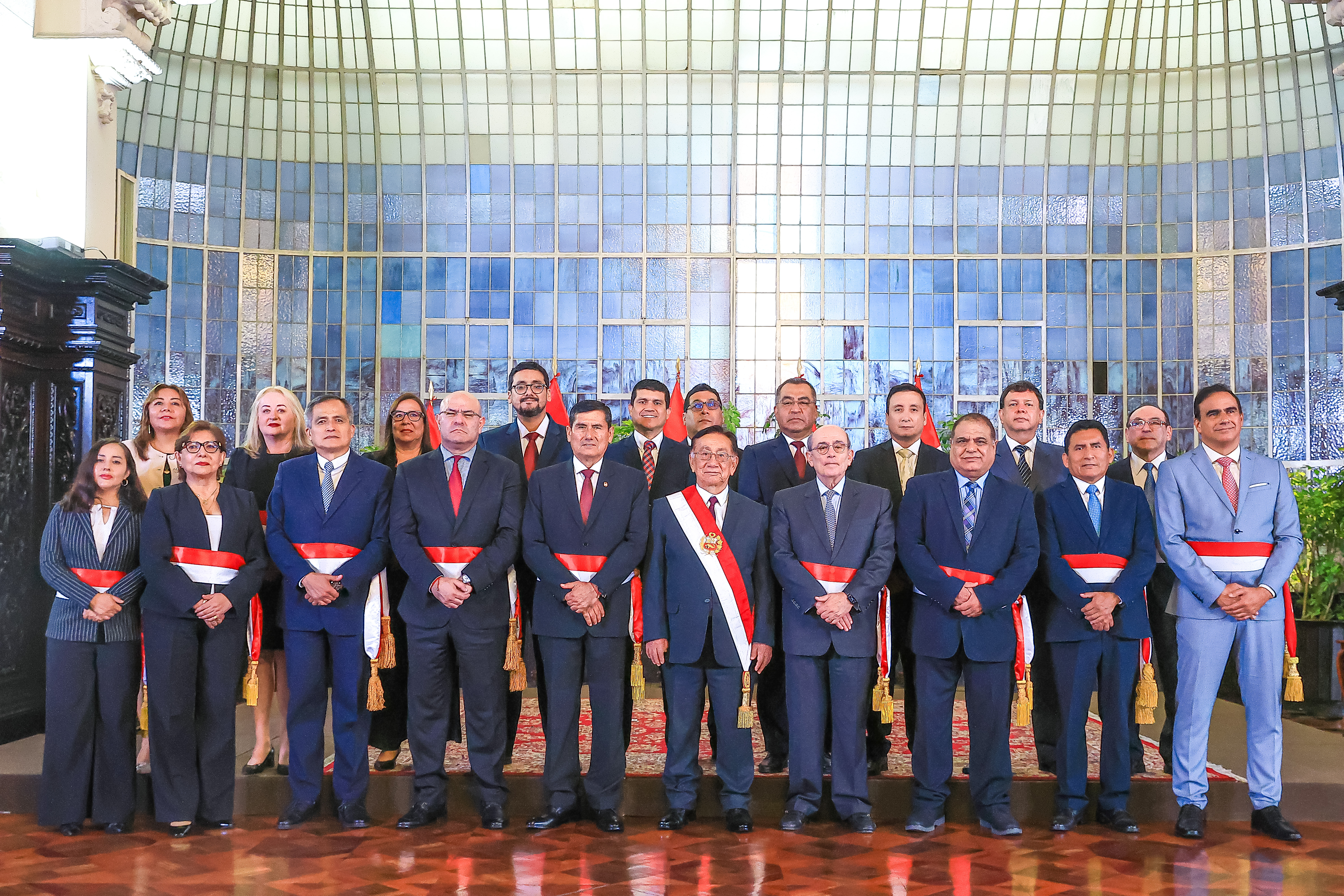
Balcázar and his second cabinet, led by Luis Arroyo Sánchez

The cabinet of Balcázar is composed of the heads of the ministries of Peru and the prime minister or premier, gathered in the Council of Ministers of Peru. Balcázar announced his first ministers on 24 February 2026, six days after his presidential inauguration that began his government.

Ministry	Cabinet		Minister	Party	Term	
Ministry	Cabinet		Minister	Party	Start	End
Ministry	No.	PCM	Minister	Party	Start	End
President of the Council of Ministers	1	Miralles	Denisse Miralles	Independent-pro APP	24 February 2026	17 March 2026
President of the Council of Ministers	2	Arroyo	Luis Arroyo Sánchez	Independent	17 March 2026	28 July 2026
Ministry of Foreign Affairs	1	Miralles	Hugo de Zela	Independent	24 February 2026	22 April 2026
Ministry of Foreign Affairs	2	Arroyo	Hugo de Zela	Independent	24 February 2026	22 April 2026
Ministry of Foreign Affairs	2	Arroyo	Carlos Pareja Ríos	Independent	23 April 2026	28 July 2026
Ministry of Defense	1	Miralles	Luis Arroyo Sánchez	Independent	24 February 2026	17 March 2026
Ministry of Defense	2	Arroyo	Carlos Díaz Dañino	Independent	17 March 2026	22 April 2026
Ministry of Defense	2	Arroyo	Amadeo Flores Carcagno	Independent- pro Popular Force	22 April 2026	28 July 2026
Ministry of Economy and Finance	1	Miralles	Gerardo López Gonzales	Independent-pro APP	24 February 2026	17 March 2026
Ministry of Economy and Finance	2	Arroyo	Rodolfo Acuña Namihas	Independent	17 March 2026	28 July 2026
Ministry of the Interior	1	Miralles	Hugo Begazo	Independent	24 February 2026	17 March 2026
Ministry of the Interior	2	Arroyo	José Zapata Morante	Independent	17 March 2026	28 July 2026
Ministry of Justice and Human Rights	1	Miralles	Luis Jiménez Borra	Independent	24 February 2026	28 July 2026
Ministry of Justice and Human Rights	2	Arroyo	Luis Jiménez Borra	Independent	24 February 2026	28 July 2026
Ministry of Education	1	Miralles	Erfurt Castillo Vera	Independent	24 February 2026	17 March 2026
Ministry of Education	2	Arroyo	María Cuadros	Independent	17 March 2026	28 July 2026
Ministry of Health	1	Miralles	Luis Quiroz Avilés	Independent-pro APP	24 February 2026	11 March 2026
Ministry of Health	1	Miralles	Juan Carlos Velasco	Independent	11 March 2026	28 July 2026
Ministry of Health	2	Arroyo	Juan Carlos Velasco	Independent	11 March 2026	28 July 2026
Ministry of Agriculture Development and Irrigation	1	Miralles	Felipe Meza	Independent	24 February 2026	28 July 2026
Ministry of Agriculture Development and Irrigation	2	Arroyo	Felipe Meza	Independent	24 February 2026	28 July 2026
Ministry of Labour and Employment Promotion	1	Miralles	Óscar Fernández Cáceres	Christian People's Party	24 February 2026	29 May 2026
Ministry of Labour and Employment Promotion	2	Arroyo	Óscar Fernández Cáceres	Christian People's Party	24 February 2026	29 May 2026
Ministry of Labour and Employment Promotion	2	Arroyo	Freddy Solano	Adelante Pueblo Unido	29 May 2026	9 July 2026
Ministry of Labour and Employment Promotion	2	Arroyo	Flavio Cruz Mamani	Free Peru	9 July 2026	28 July 2026
Ministry of Production	1	Miralles	César Quispe Luján	Independent-pro APP	24 February 2026	28 July 2026
Ministry of Production	2	Arroyo	César Quispe Luján	Independent-pro APP	24 February 2026	28 July 2026
Ministry of Foreign Trade and Tourism	1	Miralles	José Reyes Llanos	First the People	24 February 2026	28 July 2026
Ministry of Foreign Trade and Tourism	2	Arroyo	José Reyes Llanos	First the People	24 February 2026	28 July 2026
Ministry of Energy and Mines	1	Miralles	Ángelo Alfaro	Independent	24 February 2026	23 March 2026
Ministry of Energy and Mines	2	Arroyo	Ángelo Alfaro	Independent	24 February 2026	23 March 2026
Ministry of Energy and Mines	2	Arroyo	Waldir Ayasta	Independent	23 March 2026	28 July 2026
Ministry of Transport and Communications	1	Miralles	Aldo Prieto	Independent-pro APP	24 February 2026	28 July 2026
Ministry of Transport and Communications	2	Arroyo	Aldo Prieto	Independent-pro APP	24 February 2026	28 July 2026
Ministry of Housing, Construction and Sanitation	1	Miralles	Wilder Sifuentes	Independent-pro APP	24 February 2026	28 July 2026
Ministry of Housing, Construction and Sanitation	2	Arroyo	Wilder Sifuentes	Independent-pro APP	24 February 2026	28 July 2026
Ministry of Women and Vulnerable Populations	1	Miralles	Hary Yzarra	Independent	24 February 2026	17 March 2026
Ministry of Women and Vulnerable Populations	2	Arroyo	Edith Pariona	Independent	17 March 2026	28 July 2026
Ministry of the Environment	1	Miralles	Nelly Paredes del Castillo	Independent-pro APP	24 February 2026	28 July 2026
Ministry of the Environment	2	Arroyo	Nelly Paredes del Castillo	Independent-pro APP	24 February 2026	28 July 2026
Ministry of Culture	1	Miralles	Fátima Altabás	Independent	24 February 2026	28 July 2026
Ministry of Culture	2	Arroyo	Fátima Altabás	Independent	24 February 2026	28 July 2026
Ministry of Development and Social Inclusion	1	Miralles	Lily Vásquez	Independent	24 February 2026	28 July 2026
Ministry of Development and Social Inclusion	2	Arroyo	Lily Vásquez	Independent	24 February 2026	28 July 2026

== Policies ==
=== Alleged pardon for Pedro Castillo ===
During the period of internal congressional elections, the possibility of an alleged release of former president Pedro Castillo, accused of carrying out an attempted self-coup in 2022, had been raised under a possible government led by Balcázar; although later, after assuming the presidency, he told the press that "there is no pardon for Castillo on the agenda", although the next day he declared that he "would evaluate it".

Lawyer Walter Ayala submitted a formal request to absolve Castillo of his criminal charges, which was presented before the Government Palace.

=== Secretary General of the Government Palace and presidential advisers ===
Wider Herrera was appointed secretary general of the Government Palace, with Herrera being the lawyer of Bertha Rojas, mother of Vladimir Cerrón, and close to Free Peru. Although later the appointment of José Torrico Huerta as secretary general of the presidential office was reported. It was revealed that Balcázar had as advisers James Castillo Osorio, a bachelor's degree holder in industrial engineering who had started working with Balcázar without having completed his studies, and who on social media had expressed, in reference to the death of Abimael Guzmán, that "People die and ideas remain, your thinking change [sic] Peru toward a good horizon".

Castillo Osorio's sympathy toward Antauro Humala was also revealed. Another identified adviser was Boris Espinoza Villanueva, head of the Treasury Unit of SUTRAN during Castillo's administration and accused as an accomplice of an official related to Cerrón who was sentenced for the crime of collusion. Cristian Omar Ríos Castillo, a law graduate and nephew of Castillo involved in trips aboard the presidential plane during his uncle's government, and Rubén Mamani Aguilar, who absolved Balcázar from a defamation complaint against him, were likewise revealed as advisers.

Other identified advisers of Balcázar were Lizett Taype Ccoicca, Marcia Chávez Cornejo and Keyla Caballero Quispe.

Subsequently, on 7 March, Torrico's resignation from the position of secretary general was revealed.

=== Election of prime minister ===
On 22 February 2026, Hernando de Soto was announced as the new prime minister. On 24 February, the day of the swearing-in ceremony, rumors circulated that De Soto would no longer become prime minister. These rumors were dismissed by De Soto himself, saying that "everything continues sailing smoothly". However, the option of Denisse Miralles as the new prime minister was later considered following disagreements between De Soto and Balcázar and parties such as Free Peru. Finally, Miralles was sworn in as the new prime minister. After the swearing-in, De Soto, in an interview with the press, accused the alliance between César Acuña and Vladimir Cerrón (leaders of the parties Alliance for Progress and Free Peru respectively) of having prevented him from becoming the new prime minister and that "they did not let me be sworn in".

== Disasters ==
=== 2026 Coastal El Niño ===
In February 2026, floods and mudslides broke out as a result of the intense rains caused by the early onset of the El Niño phenomenon on the national coasts.

Flooding from the coastal El Niño left more than 106 dead nationwide. One of the affected cities was Arequipa, which had a protection plan against the danger of flooding, an investigation carried out between 2021 and 2023 by Samuel Quisca Astocahuana, financed by the National Water Authority (ANA) and developed by the SQA-HMR Consortium. The Directorate of Meteorology and Atmospheric Environmental Evaluation of the National Meteorology and Hydrology Service (Senamhi) reported that the coastal El Niño could intensify before July 2026.

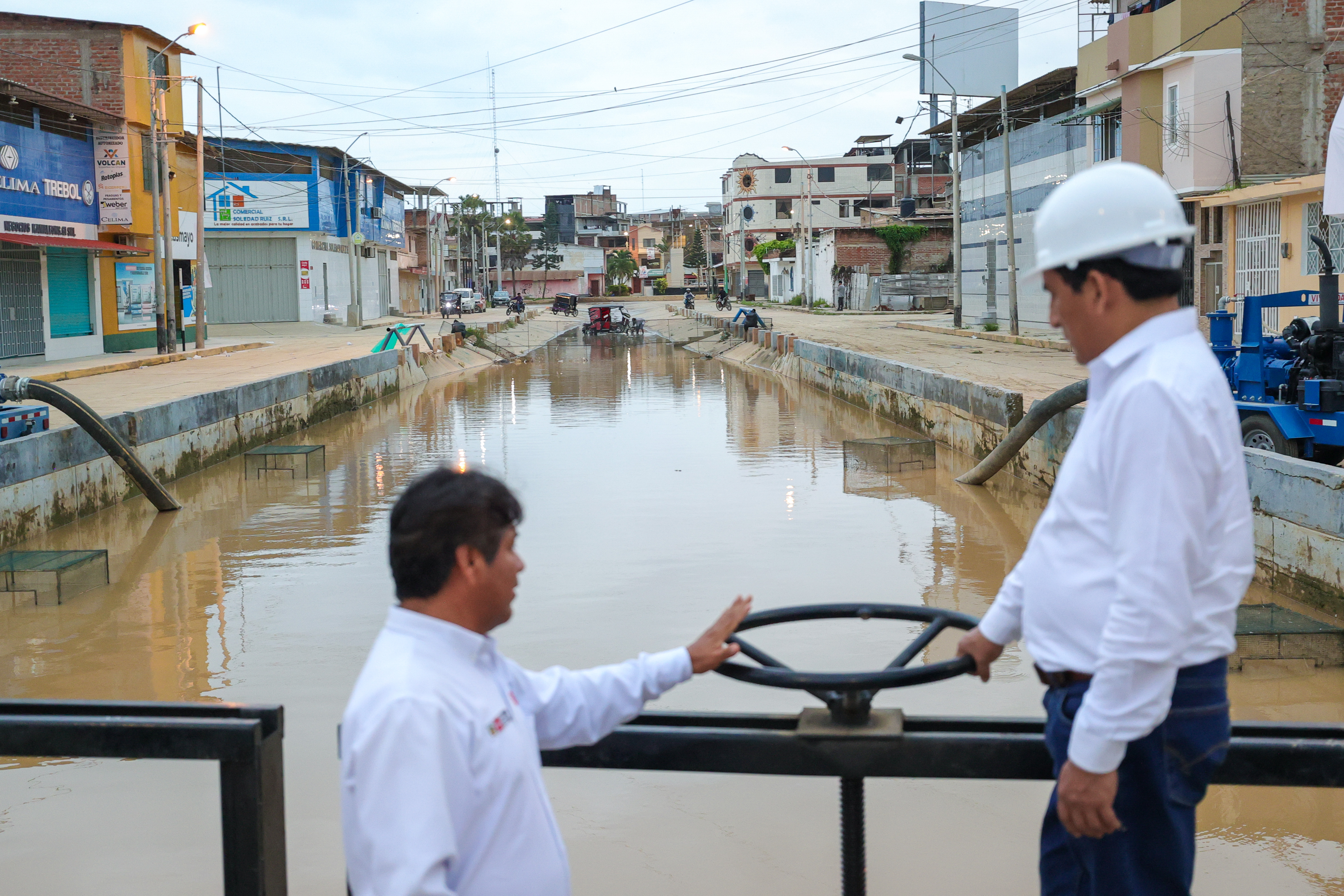
Work carried out by the minister of production and the Regional Government of Tumbes to evacuate rainwater in the populated center of El Beso with the help of transfer systems.

On 19 February, overflows in ravines in Arequipa were reported following intense rainfall. Two fatalities were reported: Moisés Gamio Manchego, 42, who was struck by lightning during the rains, and Isidora Molina Ancasi, 85, who died after being swept away by the waters along with her granddaughter. Although both were rescued, Molina died due to the severity of her injuries, while the young woman remained in serious condition. A total of 2,301 affected people and 78 displaced persons were reported in Arequipa.

Mudslides were reported in Ica, blocking vehicular traffic on the South Pan-American Highway at kilometer 337 in the Ocucaje District. In addition, a truck overturned when attempting to cross the mudslide, and a bus from the Oltursa company overturned at kilometer 367 in the Santa Cruz District, leaving 25 passengers injured. The increase in the river's flow was also reported to have swept away heavy machinery in the Cieneguilla sector and damaged sections of the Ica-Ayacucho highway, as well as plantations and roads in the El Molino sector, isolated three districts in the area, destroyed crops in Ocucaje due to mudslides, and caused landslides in the hamlet of Tingue.

High-intensity rains were reported in Tumbes and Piura, with their continuation forecast until 24 February according to SENAMHI. The rise of the Tumbes River was detected, resulting in the flooding of 600 hectares of crops, prompting SENAMHI to issue an alert to the population. The increased flow of the Piura River and the Rímac River was also reported.

In the Chongoyape District, located in Lambayeque, the lifeless body of Isidoro Barahona Díaz, 67, was found after he attempted to cross the Juana Ríos ford with his vehicle and was swept away by waters swollen from the rains. A 54-year-old merchant in the Chulucanas District, in Piura, drowned in a sudden rise in the Sol stream.

On 20 February, when asked about the floods in Arequipa that had occurred the previous day and about what had happened in Arequipa, Balcázar declared that he was unaware of what had happened, of what was happening, and of the magnitude of the damage, stating that "I am just finding out through you", and adding that he would see "how to help our brothers in Arequipa, because the situation is serious" and how to begin actions in Arequipa due to the situation. In response to those statements, Juan Carlos Linares, mayor of Cayma, declared that the president's response generated indignation, with his locality being one of the most affected. That same day, due to the rise of the Rímac River caused by the worsening of the transfer system and rains in the highlands as a consequence of the phenomenon, a young police rescuer named Patrick Ospina was swept away by the current while trying to rescue a stray dog trapped on firm ground near the riverbed; after which the Peruvian police and the Volunteer Firefighters carried out a rescue operation, requiring several avenues to be closed. The National Police of Peru confirmed Ospina's death the following day. In addition, the deaths of 48 people were reported. A strong rain accompanied by an electrical storm again struck the city of Arequipa, causing the collapse of the roof of a shopping center.

By 21 February, Luis Arroyo, head of INDECI, reported that there had been 51 deaths from the rains since the beginning of the year. Hydrogeologist Eduardo Parodi mentioned the early onset of the coastal El Niño phenomenon. Earlier, during the early morning hours, scattered moderate-intensity rains struck various districts of the capital Lima, leaving flooding on several main avenues. By 23 February, more than 2,000 displaced persons had already been reported due to floods and overflows.

Storms also struck Máncora and Vichayito, causing severe damage, including the collapse of bungalows inside a hotel and cracks on the North Pan-American Highway. One person died due to the activation of the Sol Sol stream. Likewise, torrential rainfall continued affecting the department of Arequipa, leaving a housing complex damaged in the Yanahuara District and at least four new deaths by 24 February according to regional health director Walter Oporto. On 25 February, another intense rainfall struck Lima; this came after temperatures reaching 35 degrees had been recorded, similar to those registered during the 1998 coastal El Niño; flooding was reported in Santa Clara and Huachipa, in addition to a mudslide in the upper areas of Chosica. The coastal El Niño intensified the current transfer-system rains in East Lima, causing an electrical storm around 21:30 (PET) on 5 March in Chosica. A landslide caused the blockage of the Central Highway in Junín by 20 March.

By the end of March, Senamhi reported the presence of a "Godzilla Niño", which would aggravate the situation nationwide in the coming months. On 18 May, heavy rainfall caused havoc in the city of Pucallpa.

==== Effects on daily life ====
At the beginning of March, the COEN mentioned that approximately "60% of Peruvian districts could be declared under emergency due to rains". In addition, according to the international outlet Bloomberg News, it generated rising food prices during a period of national gas supply crisis (see the next section), and the beginning of a new nationwide outbreak of dengue together with one of leptospirosis.

=== 2026 gas shortage in Peru ===
==== Overview ====
On 2 March 2026, the Vice Ministry of Hydrocarbons of the Ministry of Energy and Mines (MINEM), through Vice-Ministerial Resolution No. 004-2026-MINEM/VMH, declared the natural gas supply under emergency for 14 days, prioritizing domestic supply. Rising prices of food and gas cylinders were reported, with the crisis affecting cities such as Arequipa, Lima, Loreto, Madre de Dios and Pisco. On 6 March, remote work and virtual classes were decreed. It was announced that President José María Balcázar would travel to Megantoni, location of the gas leak, to inspect the operations carried out in the area. Despite the announcement, only Prime Minister Denisse Miralles and her ministers went to the location. On 12 March, President Balcázar, in a press conference, announced that in-person classes and in-person work would return to normal. Likewise, he established 14 March as the date for the restoration of gas and natural gas vehicle fuel services at different stations in the city of Lima, as well as the repair of the broken pipeline of the Transportadora de Gas del Perú (TGP) company in Cusco, thus concluding the stage of the energy crisis in Peru.

==== Gas pipeline rupture ====
On 1 March 2026, the rupture of pipelines belonging to Transportadora de Gas del Perú (TGP), responsible for transporting Camisea gas, was detected. It occurred at kilometer point 43 (KP43) in the Megantoni District, department of Cusco, where a flare was observed. According to TGP, at 11:00 the emergency response plan was activated and, as a preventive measure, the natural gas and natural gas liquids transportation systems were temporarily suspended. For its part, the municipality of Megantoni, through its Office of Disaster Risk Management, stated that it had become aware of the events and called for calm among the population. The Ministry of Health confirmed that 35 people were affected by the gas leak, while the district mayor of Megantoni estimated that between 1,000 and 15,000 inhabitants had been directly affected by the leak.

Regarding the causes of the accident, El Comercio reported that it could be due to human error during maintenance work. Enrique Martínez Stolzembach, senior manager of new business and institutional relations at TGP, stated that no hypothesis regarding the pipeline rupture, including sabotage, could be ruled out, although the incident was still under investigation.

==== During the repair of the gas pipeline ====
On 2 March 2026, the Vice Ministry of Hydrocarbons (of the Ministry of Energy and Mines, MINEM), through Vice-Ministerial Resolution No. 004-2026-MINEM/VMH, declared the natural gas supply under emergency for 14 days, prioritizing domestic supply. In addition, Ángelo Alfaro, minister of MINEM, ordered the creation of a crisis committee composed of the Economic Operation Committee of the National Interconnected System (COES), Osinergmin, TGP, distributor company Cálidda, among others. For its part, the National Directorate of Hydrocarbons activated a rationing scheme under Osinergmin supervision to guarantee distribution.

Beginning on 3 March, long queues started to be detected at service stations supplying compressed natural gas (CNG). Faced with the crisis, Minister Alfaro declared that transport workers should use other fuels, such as gasoline, and warned of sanctions in cases of speculation. Transport workers, meanwhile, declared that opting for gasoline reduced their income by half and that passengers refused fare increases intended to alleviate the situation. The Urban Transportation Authority for Lima and Callao (ATU) issued a statement reporting that fuel supply for the Metropolitano buses was guaranteed. Prime Minister Denisse Miralles, at a press conference, declared that gas use would be prioritized for domestic use and mass transportation.

Due to the CNG shortage, it was detected that transport workers were modifying their vehicles to use liquefied petroleum gas (LPG) as a substitute despite the risk that this practice could cause vehicles to catch fire. According to reports, drivers acquired converters costing between 40 and 60 soles to carry out the process. A vehicle fire was reported at the intersection of Venezuela and Universitaria avenues in the Lima District. Another reported case was detected in Surco next to the University of Lima. In addition, shortages and high gasoline prices were reported. It was reported that Pluspetrol, the largest LPG producer in Peru, halted production of LPG and other derivatives due to the pipeline incident.

The Urban Transport Association of Peru (ATSUPER) called for a transport service stoppage and march on 5 March due to the public transport extortion crisis and lack of gas supply. Likewise, the Yellow Taxis Coordinator of Lima and Callao reported that it was evaluating holding protests. The Association of Gas Stations and Service Stations of Peru (AGESP) issued a statement detailing that, through Directoral Resolution No. 020-2026-MINEM/DGH, distribution would be prioritized for residential consumers, merchants and mass transportation using CNG. It added that freight vehicles and light vehicles such as taxis or motorized rickshaws were not among the priorities. That same day, the Congress of the Republic invited the minister of energy and mines to explain the impact of the gas shortage, with the motion presented by congressman José Luna Gálvez. Due to the urgency of the situation, the president of the Board of Directors of Congress, Fernando Rospigliosi, summoned the minister for 4:00 p.m. that day, an act approved unanimously. At the agreed time, the minister appeared. During his presentation, he declared that the country was experiencing one of the most important energy crises in the last two decades "because of the country's high dependence on a single gas transport system", that 91% of the gas system had collapsed, that connectivity was being restored within 14 days and that the causes of the incident remained under investigation. The Energy and Mines Commission summoned the minister for 6 March to explain actions to be taken in response to the crisis.

The rise in food and gas cylinder prices was reported, with the crisis affecting cities such as Arequipa, Lima, Madre de Dios and Pisco. Likewise, queues of trucks were reported forming to obtain fuel at the Pampilla refinery, although the general director of hydrocarbons of MINEM declared she was unaware of the event. The National Association of Land Freight Transport (ANATEC) stated that 1,200 units of its members were affected by the situation and criticized the decision to exclude land freight transport from fuel prioritization, arguing that it created problems because the sector was interconnected with diverse economic sectors. In Villa El Salvador, garbage collection in the district was reported halted due to the CNG shortage.

On 6 March, due to the crisis, Prime Minister Miralles announced remote work for the public sector in Lima and Callao and encouraged its adoption in the private sector. Remote classes were also ordered for schools and universities for one week, along with the advancement of holidays in affected sectors. The implementation of remote classes and remote work was criticized by the Foreign Trade Society of Peru (ComexPerú) and the National Confederation of Private Business Institutions (CONFIEP). ComexPerú described the measure as "unacceptable", arguing that the adopted decisions shifted the burden of the crisis onto citizens and companies, and adding that the country should not paralyze its functioning in the face of similar emergencies. CONFIEP, meanwhile, stated that "we consider that an energy crisis should not be resolved by generating additional problems in education and productive activity". Meanwhile, Carlos Puente, of the Association of Gas Stations and Service Stations of Peru, declared that the impact of the rupture not only affected CNG but also extended to LPG, diesel and gasohol. For its part, Grupo Gloria announced that it would maintain its prices despite the gas shortage. It was also reported that President José María Balcázar would travel to Megantoni to inspect operations in the area. The creation of WhatsApp groups by transport workers to locate supplied filling stations in real time was detected. Gerardo Hermoza, president of the board of the Purple Corridor, reported that operations would continue until their remaining CNG ran out and criticized MINEM's management, describing it as "disastrous". The Alliance of Private Schools criticized the decision of the Council of Ministers and requested that "education" be prioritized, and later called for a protest outside MINEDU on 9 March — despite the fact that its staff would be working remotely that day.

On 7 March, Prime Minister Miralles and the ministers visited Megantoni without Balcázar being present. That day, workers began isolating the damaged pipe. On 8 March, through Ministerial Resolution No. 033-2026, the government officially established virtual classes, exempting preschool education schools and institutions lacking technological infrastructure. In addition, the government temporarily closed several museums and heavy cargo transport workers announced a strike for 12 March. During that time, the podcast La Contra reported that electricity companies Kallpa, Engie and Orygen had allegedly negotiated with the state to pass corporate losses onto citizens' electricity bills through the so-called transmission toll, in the same way as occurred with the 2008 emergency decree during the gas shortage in Lima.

By 9 March, some schools were found not complying with the regulations, arguing that "parents did not have equipment and because of work". Keiko Fujimori, leader of Popular Force, stated that if in-person classes did not resume, her party's congressional caucus would not give the Miralles cabinet a vote of confidence. Avanza País – Partido de Integración Social adopted the same position. This conditioned the government to retreat from its initial measure and allow private schools to decide whether to return to classes.

Minister Alfaro announced that TGP had advanced "48%" in repairing the pipeline by that date. TGP confirmed that the fire in the area had been extinguished, but stated that repairs would be affected by weather conditions. The following day, Osinergmin stated that several suppliers still had some fuel reserves: Pluspetrol in Pisco for 5.5 days, Solgas for 3.7 days, Terminales del Perú (TDP) for 2.3 days and Zeta Gas for 1.5 days.

On 10 March, it was announced that repairs had advanced to 52%. On 11 March, congresswoman Katy Ugarte denounced that the spokesperson of the Together for Peru caucus, Roberto Sánchez, removed her from the Consumer Defense Commission after she summoned the minister to testify. By 12 March, repairs were announced as being at 74%, while by 13 March it was announced that repair work had reached 90%. Hours later, President José María Balcázar stated that repairs had been completed and that gas supply had resumed.

==== Increase in public transport prices ====
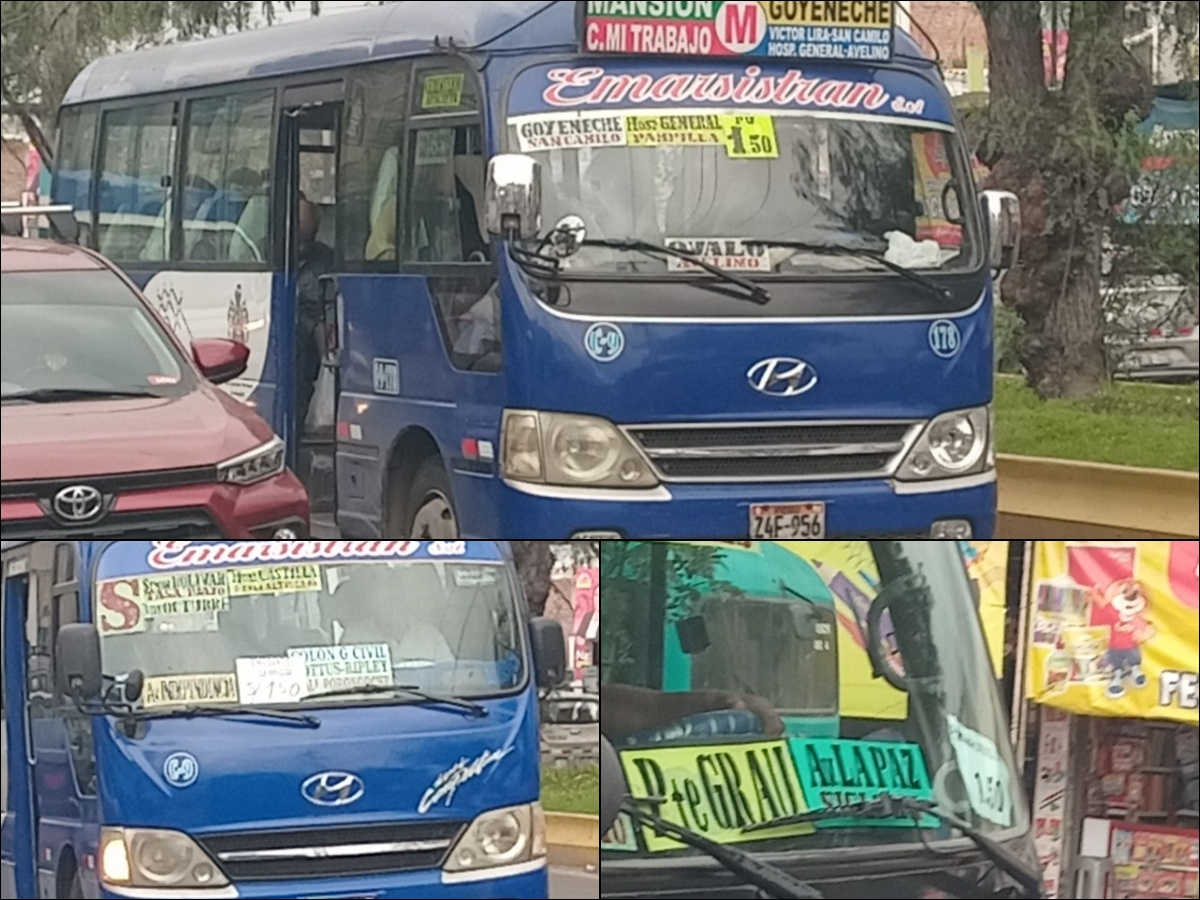
Signs showing the new fare price on SIT buses in Arequipa. They show a price of S/ 1.50, when the official fare is S/ 1.00. This measure was questioned and sanctions were even imposed for the non-consensual price increase.

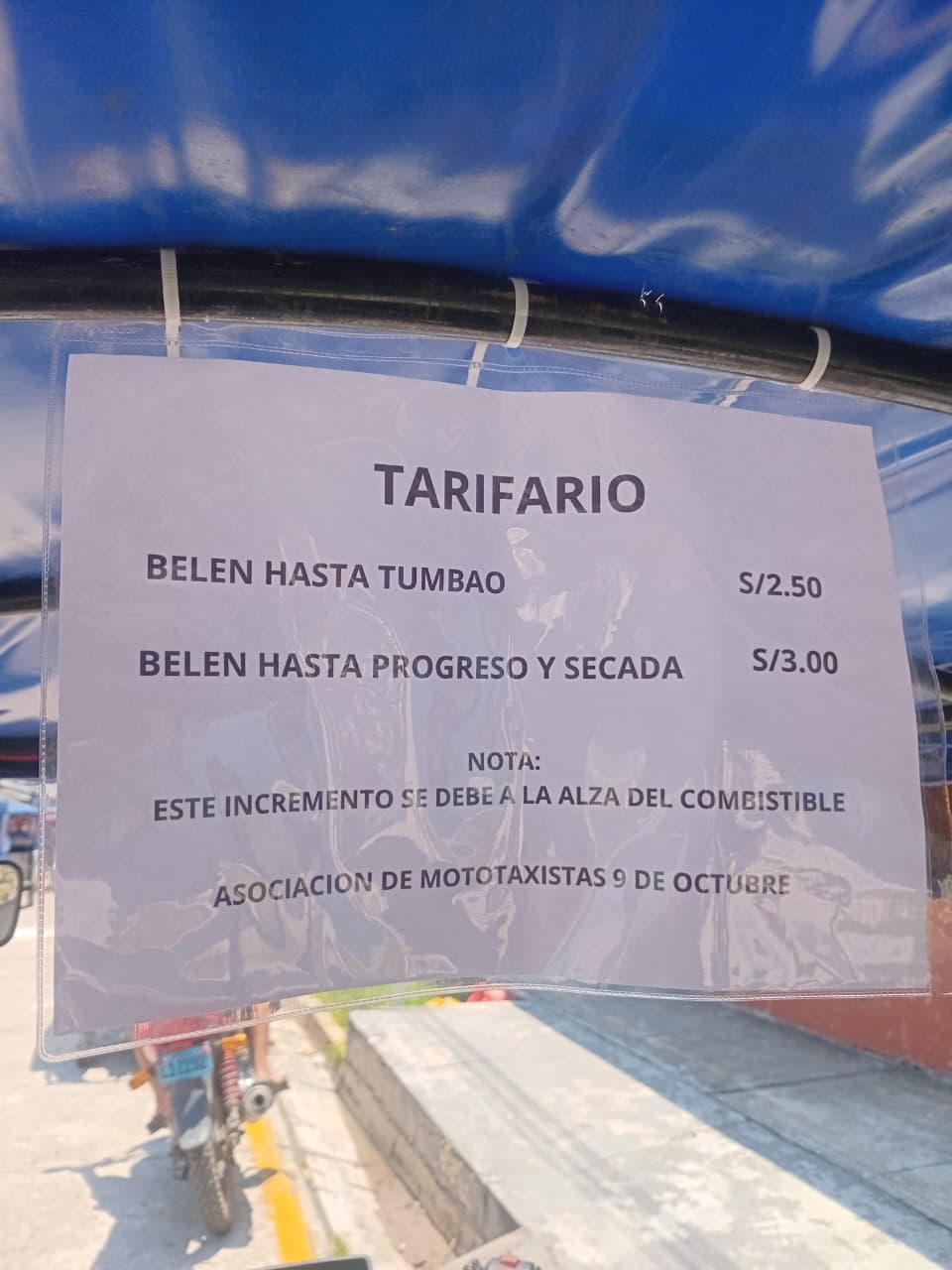
New fare schedule published by associations of motocarros in Iquitos in response to the increase in fuel prices.

In mid-March, price increases in urban transport systems occurred in several cities due to the gas shortage. In Trujillo, there was a 15% increase in all fares of a local transport company. In Juliaca, protests and roadblocks took place.

In the case of Arequipa, according to the newspaper Correo, the increase was due to the fact that "the price of a gallon rises every day, from 18 to 22 soles". The Formal Transport Workers' Front Association had issued a statement addressed directly to the Provincial Municipality, asking it to subsidize the service or grant them preferential treatment for fuel, warning that, otherwise, they would take "radical measures". As the days passed, users began to criticize transport companies over the price increase, especially in the Cono Norte, where the Transport Workers' Front carried out a "pressure measure".

The Provincial Municipality opposed a fare increase above one sol per trip, because the concessionaires had established that single fare until a new consensus was reached between the authorities and the companies. Once the pipeline was repaired, the municipality sent a notarized letter to the operators warning that, if they insisted on keeping fares high, they could be reported, either by inspectors or by users via text messages, and face service closures.

Subsequently, the Arequipa municipality yielded to pressure and announced a fare increase to 1.30 soles starting on 25 March, although oversight work would continue and there were plans to reverse that fare once the energy crisis ended. The portal El Búho noted that the Arequipa Bar Association had denounced the lack of technical support and possible price-fixing among transport companies. The Student Defense Front and the Departmental Federation of Workers of Arequipa called protests over improper regular and university fare charges. The Prosecutor's Office announced investigations into mayor Víctor Hugo Rivera over the fare increase.

==== After the gas pipeline repair ====
After the resupply of Camisea gas, the Peruvian Liquefied Gas Society stated that supply had not fully normalized until several weeks later. The government announced on 13 March that a regasification plant would be built to store more gas reserves and achieve the goal of 30 days of supply. Meanwhile, the Congress of the Republic approved an initiative to promote the use of small modular reactors to generate electricity in anticipation of the eventual depletion of the Camisea field. On 17 March, Osinergmin extended the duration of emergency measures until 21 March. The Camisea Gas operator guaranteed that the price would remain stable amid increases in other fuels.

At a public event on 20 March, President José Balcázar publicly blamed TGP for the crisis and announced that the Ministry of Economy and Finance was evaluating the possibility of activating a fund to subsidize fuels.

The newspaper La República noted that inflation in April had grown by 0.52% due to the increase in fuel prices. The head of INEI, Gaspar Morán Flores, confirmed that transport was one of the main factors that influenced the April result.

In May 2026, specialist Claudia Sícoli reported for Infobae that a fuel shortage could occur due to Petroperú's operational problems, which would cause a deeper crisis in the energy system.

=== 2026 Ica earthquake ===
Twenty-seven people were injured, the Cathedral of San Jerónimo partially collapsed, a KFC restaurant, two shopping centers, numerous schools and homes, several campuses of the National University of San Luis Gonzaga and the building of the Technological University of Peru suffered damage in Ica.The minister of defense took a flight from Lima to Pisco Airport and then traveled to the main city of the epicentral department to verify the damage caused after the earthquake.

== Foreign policy ==
In April 2026, Balcázar deferred an agreement between Peru and the United States to purchase 24 F-16 fighter jets pending the result of the 2026 Peruvian general election, saying that he did not have the legitimacy as interim leader to follow through on the deal. In response, both defense minister Carlos Díaz Dañino and foreign minister Hugo de Zela resigned in protest.

== Opinion polls ==
Pollster/Media outlet	Date	Sample	José María Balcázar (President of the Republic)			
Pollster/Media outlet	Date	Sample	Approv.	Disapp.	DK/NO	Diff.
CPI	21-23 Mar 2026	1.300	14.7%	49.6%	35.7%	
CPI	28 Feb-1 Mar 2026	1.300	14.1%	49.7%	36.2%	
Ipsos	Feb 2026	1.000	24%	63%	13%	
