= Presidency of José Jerí =

Peruvian presidential administration from 2025 to 2026

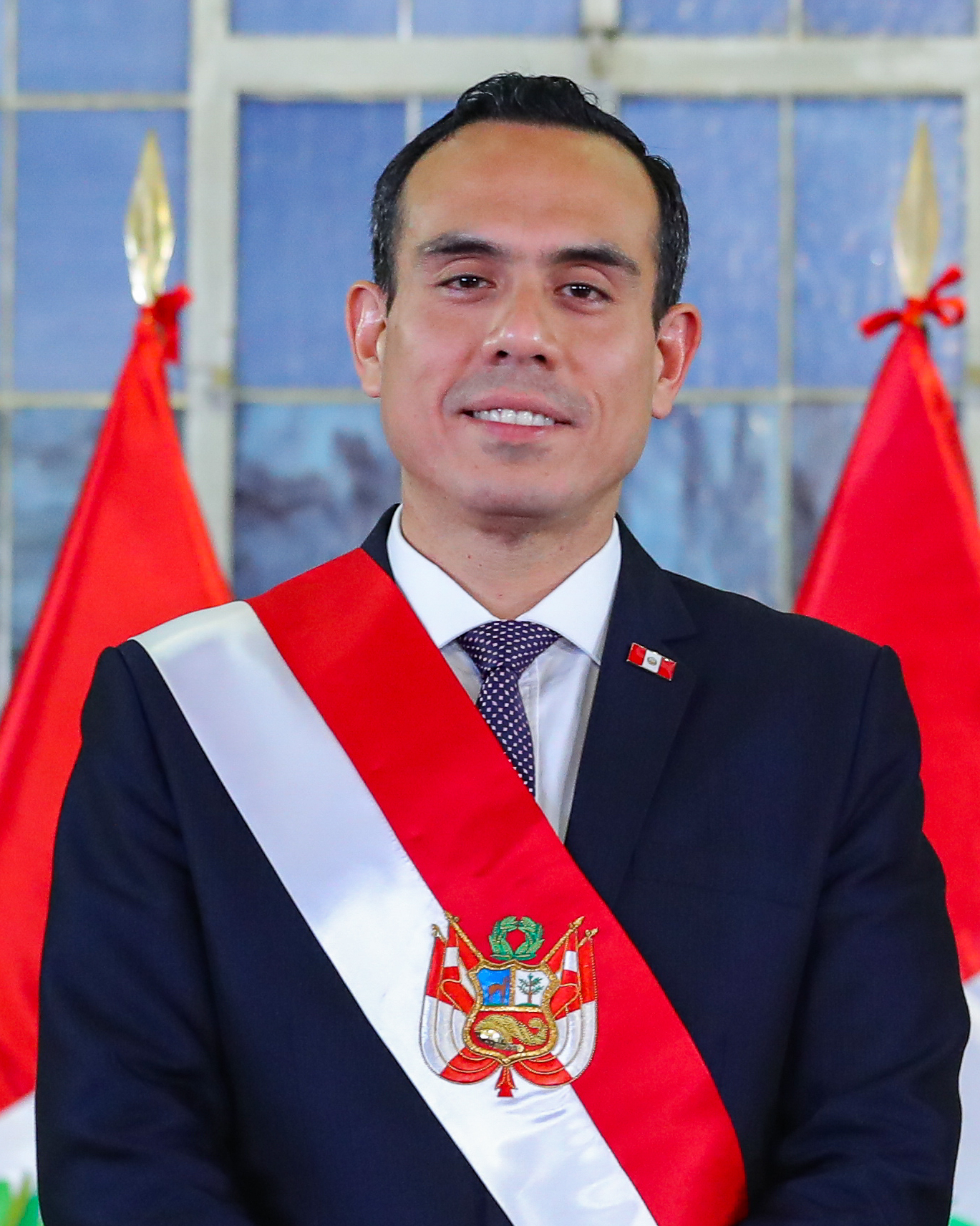
- Presidency of José Jerí; 10 October 2025 – 17 February 2026
- Prime Minister: Eduardo Arana Ysa; Ernesto Álvarez Miranda
- Cabinet: See list
- Party: Somos Perú
- Election: 2021
- Seat: Government Palace (Peru)

José Jerí became president of Peru following the impeachment of Dina Boluarte on October 10, 2025.

== Background ==
Former president Dina Boluarte was impeached after midnight on October 10, 2025, after she failed to appear before Congress to defend herself against Agenda 19770, which brought forward a motion to impeach due to Boluarte's failure to lower crime rates in the country. Despite Boluarte's lawyer, Juan Carlos Portugal, argument that she did not have enough time to prepare herself which violated the right to defence, the Congress moved forward with the impeachment motions. With a vote of 122–0 and 0 abstentions, her impeachment was announced at 00:07.

Once the impeachment process was complete, Congress opened a motion of censure against Jerí, who was congressional president. After the motion of censure was rejected, Jerí was instated as the president of Peru.

== Assumption of office ==
On 10 October 2025, the Congress of the Republic unanimously declared the vacancy for permanent moral incapacity of then president Dina Boluarte. Once the removal process concluded, Parliament debated a motion of censure against the Board of Directors, made up of the Bloque Democrático coalition. José Jerí was the president of Congress at the time, elected by said coalition. After the motion was rejected, Jerí was sworn in at 01:00 Peruvian time and assumed the presidency of the Republic in accordance with the line of succession, becoming the third head of state of the 2021–2026 period and the seventh since 2016.

In his inaugural speech, Jerí emphasized the need to confront the citizen insecurity crisis and committed himself to “installing and leading a government of transition, empathy, and national reconciliation” in the face of the political crisis affecting the country.

== Cabinet ==
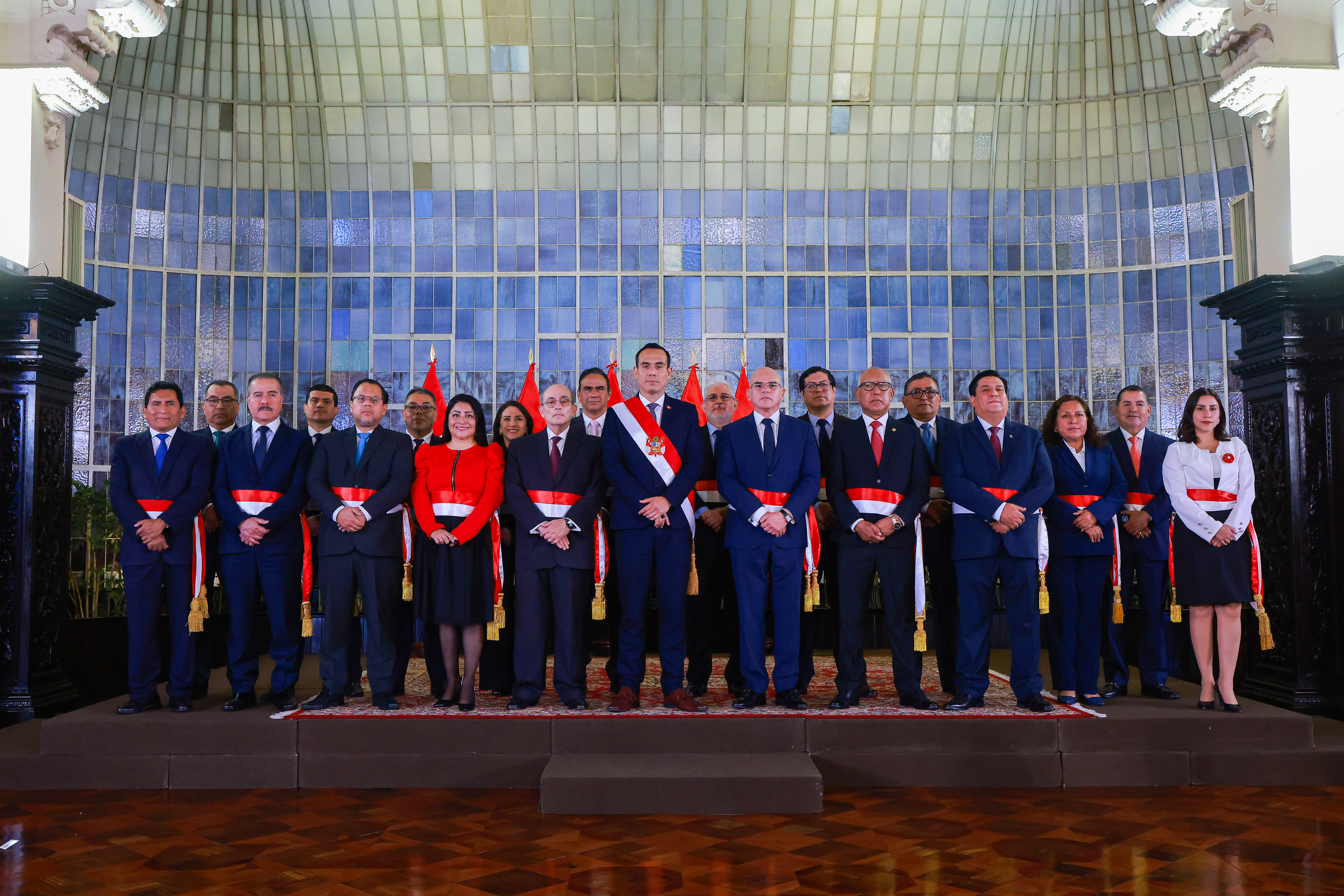
Jerí and members of his cabinet

Ministry	Minister		Party	Term	
Ministry	Portrait	Name	Party	Start	End
Presidency of the Council of Ministers		Ernesto Álvarez Miranda	PPC	14 October 2025	17 February 2026
Ministry of Foreign Affairs		Hugo de Zela	Indep.	14 October 2025	17 February 2026
Ministry of Defense		César Díaz Peche	Indep.	14 October 2025	17 February 2026
Ministry of Economy and Finance		Denisse Miralles	Indep.	14 October 2025	17 February 2026
Ministry of the Interior		Vicente Tiburcio	Indep.	14 October 2025	17 February 2026
Ministry of Justice and Human Rights		Walter Martínez Laura	Indep.	14 October 2025	17 February 2026
Ministry of Education		Jorge Figueroa Guzmán	Indep.	14 October 2025	17 February 2026
Ministry of Health		Luis Quiroz Avilés	Indep.	14 October 2025	17 February 2026
Ministry of Agrarian Development and Irrigation		Vladimir Cuno Salcedo	Indep.	14 October 2025	17 February 2026
Ministry of Labour and Promotion of Employment		Óscar Fernández Cáceres	PPC	14 October 2025	17 February 2026
Ministry of Production		César Quispe Luján	Indep.	14 October 2025	17 February 2026
Ministry of Foreign Commerce and Tourism		Teresa Mera Gómez	Indep.	14 October 2025	17 February 2026
Ministry of Energy and Mines		Luis Bravo de la Cruz	Indep.	14 October 2025	17 February 2026
Ministry of Transportation and Communications		Aldo Prieto	Indep.	14 October 2025	17 February 2026
Ministry of Housing, Construction and Sanitation		Wilder Sifuentes	Indep.	14 October 2025	17 February 2026
Ministry of Women and Vulnerable Populations		Sandra Gutiérrez	PDSP	14 October 2025	17 February 2026
Ministry of the Environment		Miguel Ángel Espichán	Indep.	14 October 2025	17 February 2026
Ministry of Culture		Alfredo Luna	AvP	14 October 2025	17 February 2026
Ministry of Development and Social Inclusion		Lesly Shica	Indep.	14 October 2025	17 February 2026

== Policies ==
=== First meetings ===
On Saturday, 11 October 2025, after assuming the presidency, Jerí met with representatives of 35 urban transport unions following the announcement of a strike scheduled for 15 October together with the collective “Generación Z”. The meeting was held with the purpose of clarifying commitments previously established with the executive branch regarding the extortion crisis nationwide. Consequently, it was confirmed that several transport services would not join the previously proposed strike.

The following day, 12 October, Jerí held talks with Aldo Mariños – mayor of Pataz Province, who had carried out a 48-day march together with local peasant patrols and other opposition groups toward the city of Lima – regarding health and security problems in Pataz Province, Department of La Libertad. On 14 October, Jerí spoke with 90% of the mayors of the districts of the Lima metropolitan area, whose most requested topics were security, education, and investment. He subsequently met with the mayors of the districts of the Constitutional Province of Callao, representatives of native communities from Huánuco, Loreto, and Ucayali, mayors from northeastern Peru, regional governors, and former members of the GEIN and police commissioners.

=== Election of prime minister ===
In the first days of his government, Jerí was criticized for his lack of speed in forming the ministerial cabinet. In response to the criticism, Jerí announced that his cabinet would not be made up of ministers from the previous government or members of Congress, following rumors that Raúl Pérez-Reyes, economy minister during Boluarte's government, would become the new prime minister. Finally, Ernesto Álvarez Miranda was chosen as prime minister. According to Caretas, before Álvarez's appointment, the president had offered the post of prime minister to seven other figures, who rejected the position.

=== Diplomatic conflict with Mexico ===
On 3 November 2025, foreign minister Hugo de Zela announced that Betssy Chávez had sought asylum at the Mexican embassy, which provoked the severance of diplomatic relations with that country. Chávez, a former minister during the government of Pedro Castillo, is being investigated for the crimes of rebellion and conspiracy following the attempted self-coup in 2022, which had already generated tensions with the Mexican government because of its attempt to grant political asylum to Castillo. On 4 November, the national court decided not to declare Chávez a fugitive, therefore no search or arrest order was issued against her. The same day, President Jerí stated in an interview that “cordiality had been maintained as far as possible”.

The government ordered the expulsion of the Mexican ambassador to Peru, Karla Ornelas; a decision considered “excessive” by the foreign ministry of that nation. On 6 November, Congress declared Mexican president Claudia Sheinbaum persona non grata. On 22 November, the functions of the Peruvian consul in Mexico ceased entirely.

== Social aspect ==
=== Second phase of the Generation Z protests ===
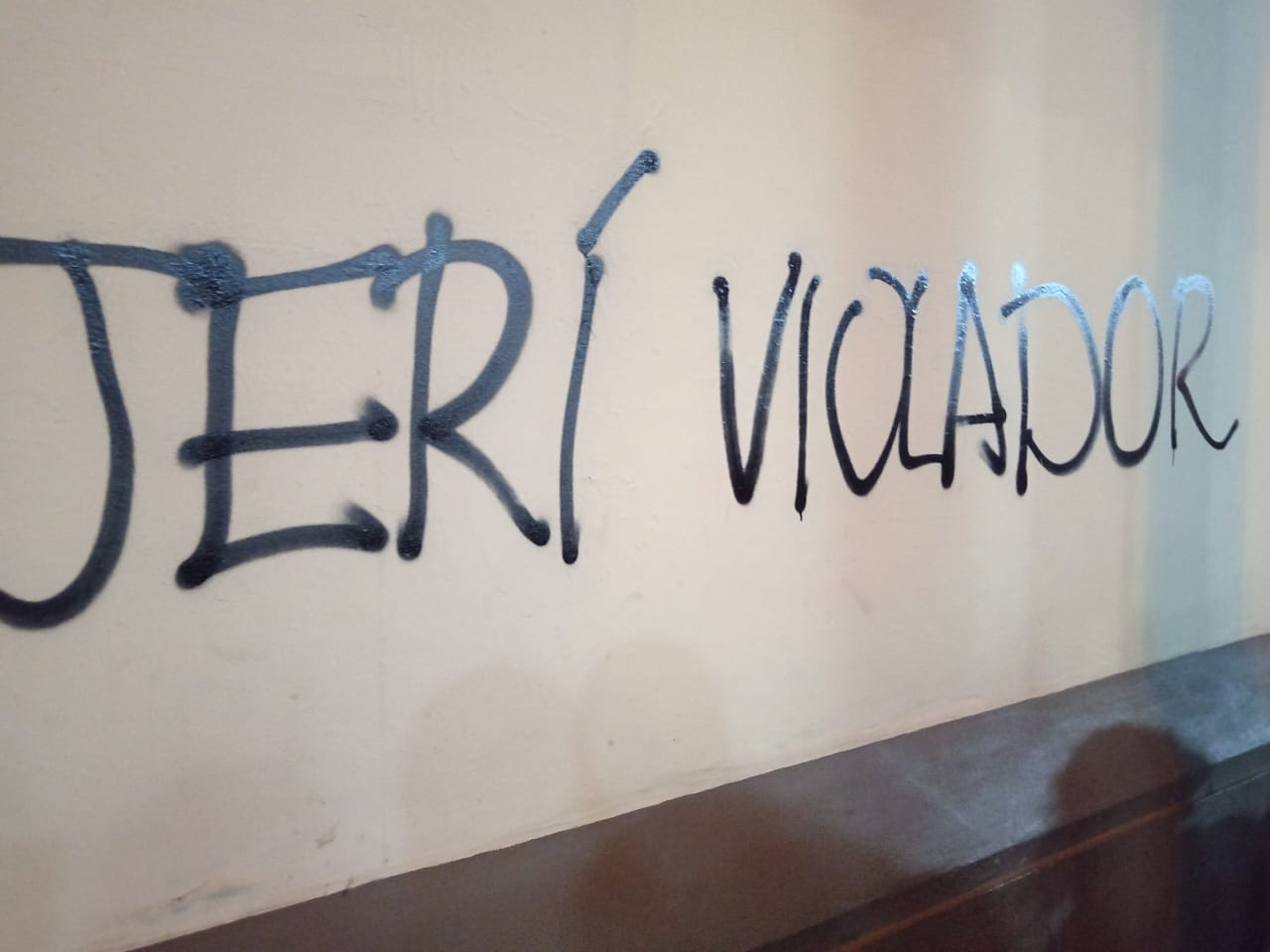
Graffiti against José Jerí's administration as president, emphasizing the accusation against him for alleged rape, which was later dismissed.

From the very day José Jerí was sworn in as president of the Republic, protests and citizen mobilizations broke out throughout the country (mainly in Lima), demanding various reforms. This was partly contributed to by the president's unpopularity stemming from an investigation against him for an alleged sexual assault case during a party at Casa Club Santa Rosa de Quives in Canta, which was shelved some time after being opened, together with the recent controversy surrounding comments considered misogynistic published by him through his main Twitter account; in addition to the fact that during his time as a congressman he allegedly approved certain laws on insecurity that generated indignation among the national citizenry.

The marches significantly increased in attendance on 15 October, the date of the official call by the Generación Z collective and labor unions. From 15:00 (PET), protests began in Chimbote, Cusco, Arequipa, Piura, Trujillo, Chiclayo, Huancayo, Iquitos, Huaraz, Cajamarca, Tarapoto, Lima, Ayacucho, Puerto Maldonado, Huánuco, Ucayali, and Juliaca.

During the demonstrations, several violent incidents occurred between protesters and security agents, especially in the main squares of Arequipa and Lima; among them clashes near Congress that led to a fire in front of the building, riots in the Plaza de Armas of Arequipa near the site where the 10th International Congress of the Spanish Language was to be held, an attempted attack on the headquarters of the Public Ministry using stones and fireworks, in addition to further clashes that left a total of more than 100 injured (both police officers and civilians) and caused the death of a protester identified as Eduardo Ruíz, who was struck by a pellet fired by PNP third subofficer Luis Magallanes, a member of the Criminal Investigation Directorate (DIRINCRI), according to Óscar Arriola. In Huancavelica, a highway toward Huancayo was blocked by protesters. It was observed that some small groups of protesters in Lima's historic center behaved violently, and one of them threw a Molotov cocktail at authorities during the clashes of 15 October. Artists from the Awkapuma Collective, in the district of La Victoria, announced that they had painted an entire wall in tribute to Trvko, the young man who died during the protest.

On 25 October, a new march led by youth groups took place in Lima's historic center; unlike the previous one, it ended without incidents between police and protesters. During the same protest, a strike was called for 14 November 2025.

In the same context, presidential adviser Wilber Medina denied the existence of “pro-crime laws” and supported police firing on protesters “at the first stone thrown”.

==== Counterdemonstrations ====
Due to the calls for Generation Z demonstrations on the 15th, groups in favor of Jerí's presidency called a March for Peace in downtown Lima. The demonstrators, under the slogan "Peace and Unity", reached Plaza San Martín. President José Jerí appeared to express his support for the mobilization and gave a speech calling for peace and the stability of the country.

Later, influencer Jorge Ugarte called a counterprotest — self-described as the "March for Peace" or "Police Resist" — in support of the government authorities and the National Police of Peru for 25 October. On the scheduled day, a number of people, including relatives of officers, retired police officers, and civil organizations, gathered at the Campo de Marte to carry out the mobilization. Former interior minister Juan José Santiváñez appeared in support of the march in favor of the National Police.

=== Mining protests ===
On 20 October, unions of illegal mining companies gathered at Campo de Marte to march to the Congress of the Republic to demand the extension of the Reinfo mechanism for at least five years and the approval of the MAPE law. During the mobilization, streets near Congress were blocked, including Abancay Avenue and the Huancavelica, Junín, and Áncash streets. Jerí supported extending the mining formalization deadline by one year.

== Security ==
=== Nationwide crime wave ===
On 11 October, the president led an unannounced visit to Ancón I prison as part of a simultaneous operation that included searches in the Lurigancho, El Milagro, and Challapalca prisons. On 13 October, Jerí, from Castro Castro prison, led a new operation in prisons, with this activity carried out in the Huaral, Picsi, and Huamancaca prisons. On 15 October, President Jerí, making use of his status as a member of Congress, introduced a bill for prison inmates to work on reforestation, tree planting, and water management in headwaters and high Andean slopes, in addition to proposing the creation of the National High-Andean Prison Reforestation Program (PRPA). On 18 October, the Ministry of Development and Social Inclusion (MIDIS) announced that 14 million soles would be allocated, through FONCODES, to improve the equipment and infrastructure of 20 police stations, with the announcement made after minister Lesly Shica visited the PNP Alfonso Ugarte police station. That same day, due to the escape of a Venezuelan inmate named Krisman Nizama Ponce, the president, together with his ministers, inspected Huaral prison and the PNP police station in Aucallama.

On 21 October 2025, through an address to the nation, he announced the establishment of a 30-day state of emergency in Lima and Callao from 00:00 on the 22nd in response to the insecurity crisis, established by Supreme Decree No. 124-2025-PCM. Measures were announced including restrictions on visits to prisons, electricity blackouts in prisons and the dismantling of illegal telecommunications antennas, joint work by the Armed Forces together with the police and serenazgo, search and arrest operations for wanted persons, identity-control operations for foreign citizens, identity-control operations for motorized and non-motorized vehicles, a provision banning two people from riding on one motorcycle, intervention and impoundment of vehicles with adulterated or damaged documentation, operations to seize illegal weapons and explosives, oversight of the artisanal manufacture of pyrotechnics as well as their marketing and use, polygraph tests for INPE personnel by the National Intelligence System as well as other officials, and the declaration of permanent session of the National Citizen Security Council (CONASEC), the Regional Citizen Security Committees (CORESEC) of Metropolitan Lima and the Constitutional Province of Callao, the District Citizen Security Committees (CODISEC) of Metropolitan Lima and the Constitutional Province of Callao, the National Criminal Policy Council (CONAPC), as well as the unified operational coordination, intelligence, oversight, and strategic communication committees. After the announcement, President Jerí was seen touring the districts of Los Olivos, San Martín de Porres, Comas, and Carabayllo, accompanying the ordered actions, as well as inspecting operational work carried out at Lurigancho prison.

Days later, in a public talk with university students from the Scientific University of the South organized by the newspaper El Comercio, Jerí denied the existence of "pro-crime laws", although he left open the possibility of proposing legal modifications in criminal law if they were suggested by lawyers "with objective criteria", such as APRA lawyer Humberto Abanto and César Nakazaki, former lawyer of Alberto Fujimori. Ernesto Álvarez, a minister under Jerí, accused "a certain sector of the left committed to corruption" of describing enacted laws, such as Law 32108, as "pro-crime laws".

=== Migrant crisis on the Chile–Peru border ===
After presidential candidates José Antonio Kast (the eventual winner) and Jeannette Jara advanced to the runoff in the 2025 Chilean presidential election, and given polls projecting the former as the likely winner, concern among the Latin American migrant population in Chile intensified. Kast proposed in his political program the implementation of a policy of rapid expulsions for those in an irregular situation, following a model similar to that applied in the United States.

As a consequence of these statements, numerous migrants have chosen to leave the country preventively. This has generated a significant increase in the flow of people toward the border with Peru. In response, President Jerí took measures such as declaring a state of emergency on all the country's borders and with it the militarization of the Tacna border area. On 28 November, the Peruvian government announced that, before midnight, the declaration of a state of emergency in Tacna would be approved. President Jerí, through X, posted that: "this will be the first of our borders to be declared under emergency due to irregular migration and citizen security". That same day, Supreme Decree No. 135-2025-PCM was published, establishing the state of emergency in the border districts of Palca, Tacna, and La Yarada-Los Palos in Tacna Province. Likewise, the Regional Citizen Security Committee was declared in permanent session for the duration of the state of emergency. Migratory measures were established, such as motorized patrols along the border line, the interception of migrants attempting to cross through unauthorized crossings, the carrying out of operations and aerial monitoring with drones, in addition to intelligence actions. Prime Minister Ernesto Álvarez specified that the state of emergency would take effect from the same 28th. For his part, interior minister Vicente Tiburcio stated that the state of emergency would be extended to other Peruvian borders.

== Disasters ==
=== Pamplona Alta fire ===
Jerí arrived at the site of the fire on two different occasions to monitor the damage recorded. He arrived at the Peruvian Sports Institute (IPD) facility in SJM, where a temporary shelter was set up for the affected families, where they would receive food and assistance.

The Ministry of Education (MINEDU) provided socioemotional care to students affected by the fire. The Ministry of Women and Vulnerable Populations (MIMP) opened three collection centers for families who lost their homes.

=== 2025 Chimbote earthquake ===
A magnitude 6.2 earthquake occurred in Chimbote on Saturday, 27 December 2025. The earthquake was felt from Piura Department to the city of Lima. Multiple material damages and a blackout were recorded in Santa Province, and structures were similarly affected in Trujillo. The president of Peru, José Jerí, published a message through Twitter, asking the population that felt the earthquake to remain calm.

== Removal ==
On 17 February 2026, interim president of Peru José Jerí was removed through a motion of censure, leaving the office vacant.

This occurred after it was discovered that Jerí held clandestine meetings with Chinese businessmen, especially Zhihua Yang, in places such as a chifa restaurant on 26 December 2025 and the "Market Capón" store in Lima's Chinatown on 6 January 2026. Jerí justified it as a simple purchase of sweets. Subsequently, Jerí faced a second investigation related to the irregular hiring of several women during his term. These hires were described as young and inexperienced women who occupied positions in his administration.

The Peruvian Congress censured Jerí after a motion of censure passed with 75 votes in favor and 24 against. Only his own party and the Fujimorist Popular Force voted against his removal.

On 18 February, four candidates were nominated for consideration as Jerí's successor: congressman Edgard Reymundo of Together for Peru, congressman José María Balcázar of Free Peru, congresswoman Maricarmen Alva of Popular Action and Héctor Acuña of Honor and Democracy. Balcázar was elected amid accusations from the Peruvian right wing.

== Opinion polls ==
=== Presidential approval ===
Pollster/Media outlet	Date	Sample	José Jerí (President of the Republic)			
Pollster/Media outlet	Date	Sample	Approv.	Disapp.	DK/NO	Diff.
CPI/RPP	14–18 Feb 2026	1300	26.9	59.4	13.7	–32.5
CIT	5–9 Feb 2026	1220	26.5	64.3	9.2	–37.8
Imasen	6 Feb 2026	1300	24.1	70.4	5.5	–46.3
Ipsos Perú/Perú21	5–6 Feb 2026	1211	30	61	9	–31
Datum Internacional/El Comercio	30 Jan–3 Feb 2026	1200	37	53	10	–16
CPI/RPP	29 Jan–2 Feb 2026	1200	39.5	47.6	12.9	–7.9
IEP/La República	16–21 Jan 2026	1211	33	56	11	–23
Datum Internacional/América	16–20 Jan 2026	1202	41	49	10	–8
CIT	16–20 Jan 2026	1220	30.0	57.9	12.1	–27.9
Activa/Pulso Ciudadano	9–20 Jan 2026	803	34.9	44.4	20.8	–9.5
AtlasIntel/Bloomberg	15–19 Jan 2026	3262	45.6	45.9	8.4	–0.3
CPI/RPP	11–16 Jan 2026	1200	44.3	40.4	15.4	+3.9
Ipsos Perú/Perú21	7–8 Jan 2026	1207	43	43	14	–
Datum Internacional/El Comercio	2–6 Jan 2026	1200	51	36	13	+15
Ipsos Perú/América	18–19 Dec 2025	1211	42	43	15	–1
AtlasIntel/Bloomberg	10–15 Dec 2025	2926	50.7	38.5	10.9	+12.2
CIT	5–9 Dec 2025	1220	40.7	41.1	18.2	–0.4
Datum Internacional/El Comercio	4–8 Dec 2025	1201	55	33	12	+22
Ipsos Perú/América	27–28 Nov 2025	1208	47	39	14	+8
AtlasIntel/Bloomberg	22–27 Nov 2025	2065	54.2	35.4	10.4	+18.8
IEP/La República	20–24 Nov 2025	1202	39	46	15	–7
CIT	14–18 Nov 2025	1220	55.0	30.8	14.2	+24.2
Imasen/Exitosa	9–15 Nov 2025	1300	45.5	47.2	7.3	–1.7
Datum Internacional/El Comercio	9–11 Nov 2025	1200	58	30	12	+28
CPI	3–7 Nov 2025	1200	55.9	27.2	16.9	+28.7
Activa/Pulso Ciudadano	20–29 Oct 2025	801	33.4	33.9	32.7	–0.5
Ipsos Perú/América	23–24 Oct 2025	1208	45	42	13	+3
CIT	21–24 Oct 2025	1220	45.5	33.9	20.6	+11.6
IEP/La República	18–22 Oct 2025	1210	32	53	15	–21
AtlasIntel/Bloomberg	15–19 Oct 2025	1175	24.5	48.8	26.7	–24.3
