= Hugo de Zela =

Peruvian diplomat and professor

His Excellency Hugo de Zela
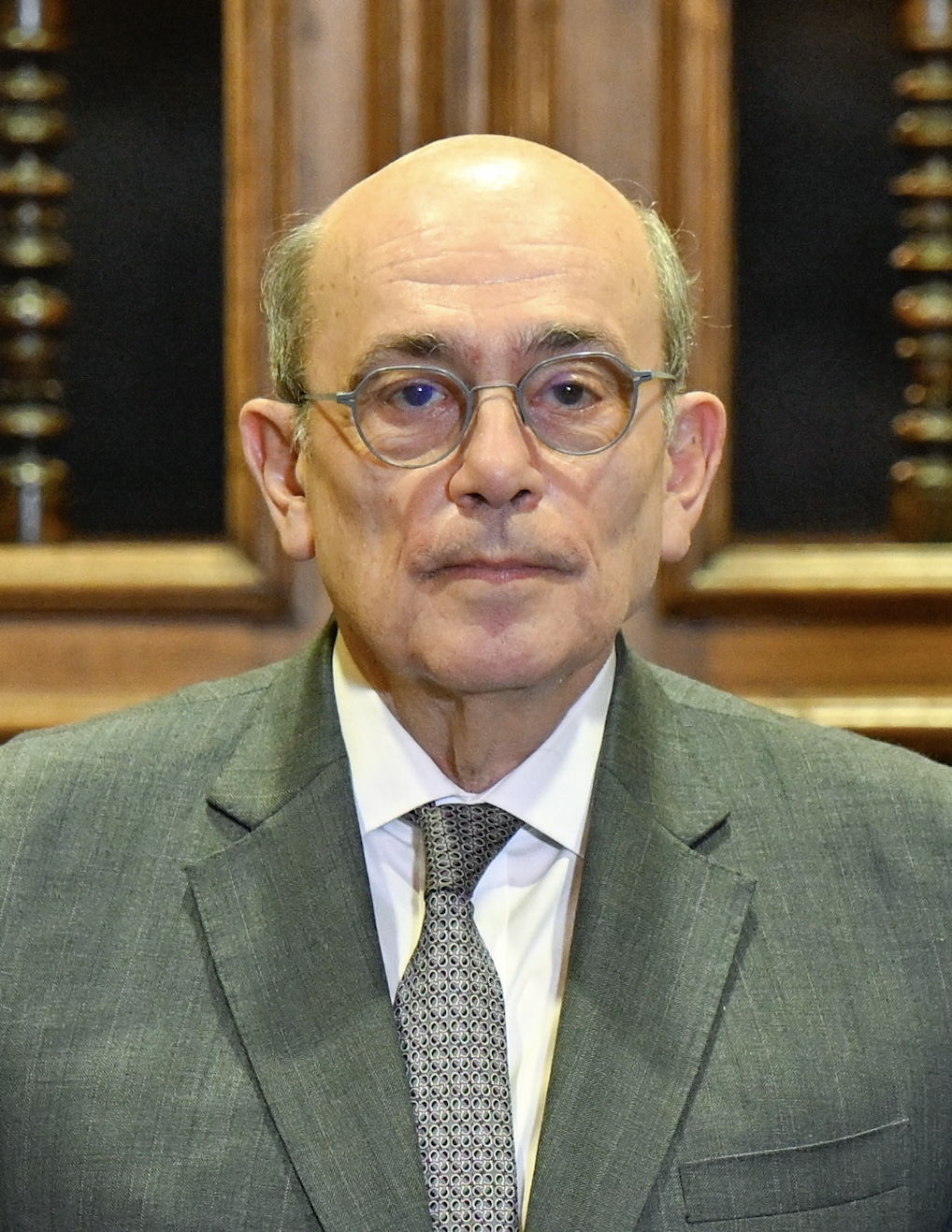
- Official portrait, 2025

Minister of Foreign Relations
- In office 14 October 2025 – 22 April 2026
- President: José Jerí; José María Balcázar
- Prime Minister: Ernesto Álvarez; Denisse Miralles; Luis Arroyo Sánchez
- Preceded by: Elmer Schialer
- Succeeded by: Carlos Pareja Ríos

Personal details
- Born: 4 August 1951 (age 74) Lima, Peru
- Occupation: Diplomat; professor

Hugo Claudio de Zela Martínez (born 4 August 1951) is a Peruvian diplomat and professor who served as Minister of Foreign Relations from 2025 until 2026.

== Career ==
De Zela was appointed Minister of Foreign Relations on 14 October 2025. He resigned along with defense minister Carlos Díaz Dañino on 22 April 2026 in protest against interim president José María Balcázar's decision to defer a purchase agreement to buy 24 F-16 fighter jets from the United States pending the result of the 2026 Peruvian general election.
