= Amadeo Flores Carcagno =

Minister of Defense of Peru
- In office April 22, 2026 – July 28, 2026
- President: José María Balcázar
- Prime Minister: Luis Arroyo Sánchez
- Preceded by: Carlos Díaz Dañino
- Succeeded by: Rafael Belaúnde

Personal details
- Born: 26 April 1981 (age 45)

Amadeo Flores Carcagno (born 26 April 1981) is a Peruvian lawyer and government official, serving as Defense Minister in 2026. He holds a master's degree but lacks a PhD.
