= Lesly Shica =

Peruvian politician (born 1993)

Minister of Development and Social Inclusion
- Incumbent
- Assumed office 14 October 2025
- President: José Jerí
- Prime Minister: Ernesto Álvarez Miranda
- Preceded by: Fanny Montellanos

Personal details
- Born: 1 September 1993 (age 32)
- Party: Alliance for Progress

Lesly Nadir Shica Seguil (born 1 September 1993) is a Peruvian politician who served as minister of development and social inclusion in the Cabinet of José Jerí from October 14, 2025 to February 18, 2026 when she formally resigned from her post before Hernando de Soto was appointed prime minister. From March to October 2025, she served as general manager of PromPerú.
