= Ilich López =

Peruvian politician (born 1985)

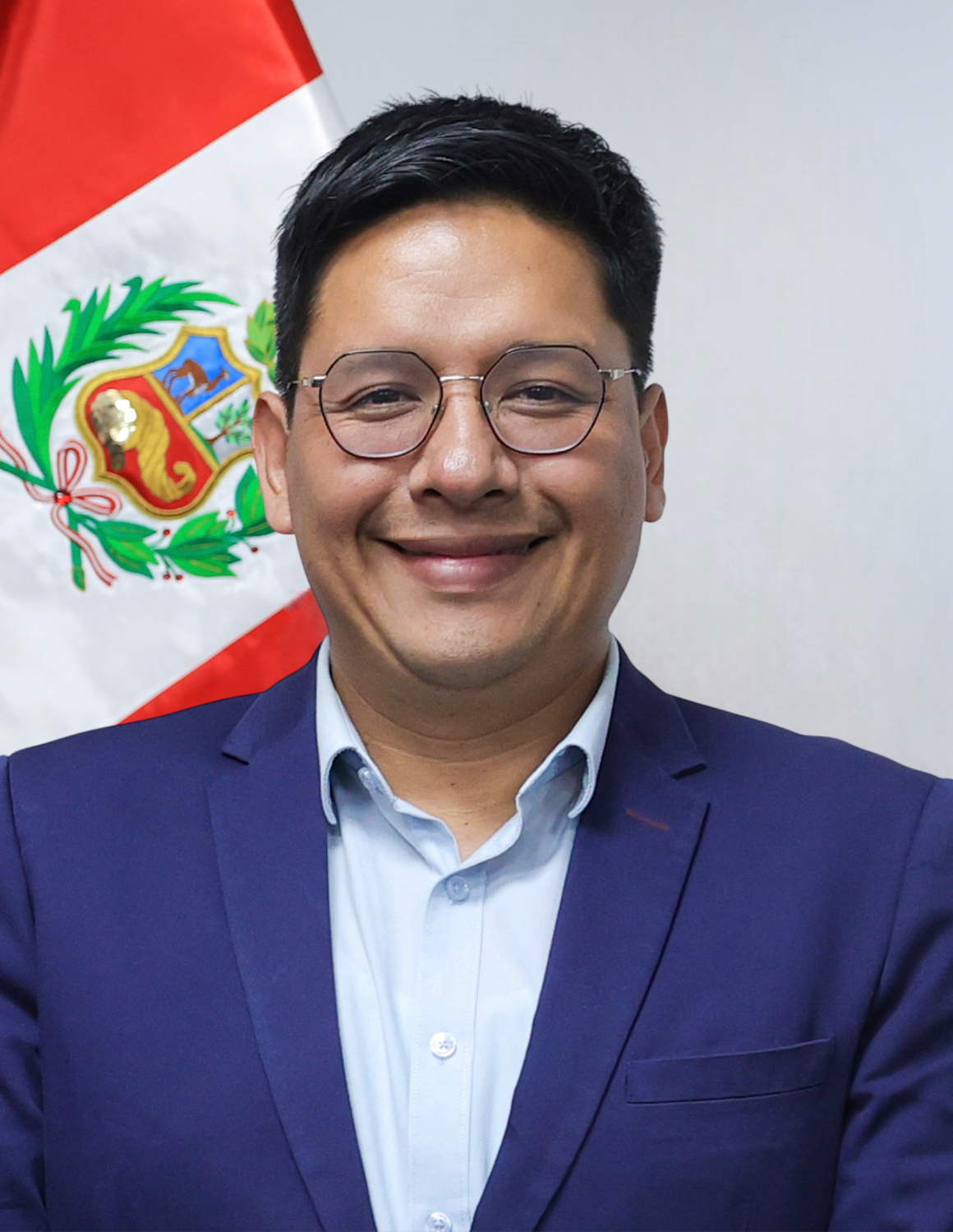
- Official portrait, 2026

Third Vice President of Congress
- In office 26 July 2025 – 26 July 2026
- President: José Jerí; Fernando Rospigliosi; José María Balcázar; Fernando Rospigliosi
- Preceded by: Alejandro Cavero
- Succeeded by: Edgar Mancha (as Second Vice President of the Senate); José Yataco (as Second Vice President of the Chamber of Deputies)

Member of Congress
- In office 27 July 2021 – 26 July 2026
- Constituency: Junín

Personal details
- Born: 15 February 1985 (age 41)
- Party: Popular Action

Ilich Fredy López Ureña (born 15 February 1985) is a Peruvian politician serving as a member of the Congress of the Republic since 2021, as well as its third vice president since 2025.

== Member of Congress (2021-2026) ==
In the 2021 Peruvian general election, López, a member of the Popular Action party, was elected as a member of the Congress of the Republic of Peru representing the Department of Junín.

From 2024 to 2025, he served as chairman of the economy, banking, finance, and financial intelligence committee.

He was elected as Third Vice President of Congress in July 2025 during José Jerí's presidency of Congress, and was re-elected in February 2026 when José María Balcázar was elected new president of Congress.

On 23 April 2026, López announced his intention to propose a motion of censure against President Balcázar, aiming to remove him from his de jure role as President of Congress and subsequently his role as the 66th President of Peru.
