= Bicentennial Peru =

Bicentennial Peru Perú Bicentenario
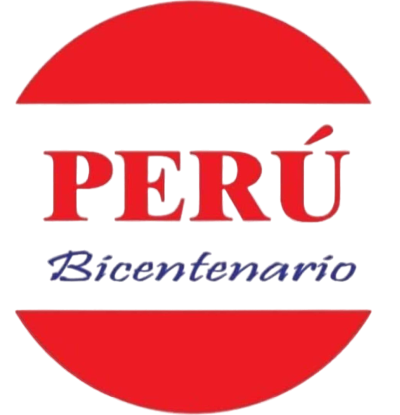
- Abbreviation: PB
- Leader: Jorge Marticorena
- Parliamentary speakers: Víctor Cutipa; Elías Varas
- Founded: 8 June 2022
- Dissolved: 22 July 2024
- Split from: Free Peru
- Headquarters: Lima
- Ideology: Socialism; Castillism
- Political position: Left-wing

Website
- Facebook page

The Bicentennial Peru (Spanish: Perú Bicentenario) was a left-wing parliamentary group of the Congress of the Republic of Peru. Formed in June 2022, it brought together deputies that had left Free Peru due to disagreement with some developments of its policies. It was dissolved on 22 July 2024.

== History ==
The president and first spokesperson, Jorge Marticorena, the parliamentarian behind the creation of the group, decided to resign from the group of Free Peru as of 26 May 2022, when the Congress of the Republic approved the non-confidence motion of Minister Betssy Chávez.

Due to the governmental crisis of May 2022, and the wave of resignations and the different lines within the group of Free Peru (the creation of the BECN group), the three congressmen Jorge Coayla, Elías Varas and Víctor Cutipa also decide to leave Free Peru.

On 8 May, the parliamentarian José María Balcazar also announces his resignation from the parliamentary group of Free Peru.

On the same day, the five congressmen who resigned due to the evolution of the government and the lines within Free Peru, announced the creation of a new parliamentary group.

Two spokespersons for the group were appointed, Víctor Cutipa and Elías Varas.

The group was dissolved on 22 July 2024.

== Ideology ==
The group could be designated as left-wing. All the parliamentarians declared themselves in dissidence and disagreement with the attitude and the relationship of Waldemar Cerrón and Free Peru with the Congress of the Republic and the evolution of the relationship with President Pedro Castillo.

Nevertheless, they declared support for ex-President Pedro Castillo and his government. The group supported similarly ideas to those of Free Peru, such as constitutional reform, food sovereignty, the fight against corruption, an increase in taxes for the richest and free access to education and health.

== Members ==
Nom	Party	Constituency	Origin group
Jorge Marticorena	Free Peru	Ica	Free Peru
Elías Varas	Free Peru	Áncash	Free Peru
Jorge Coayla	Free Peru	Moquegua	Free Peru
José María Balcázar	Free Peru	Lambayeque	Free Peru
Guido Bellido	Independent (Note: These members were elected with Free Peru as deputies but decide to leave it.)	Cuzco	Free Peru
