= Luis Arroyo Sánchez =

Prime Minister of Peru in 2026

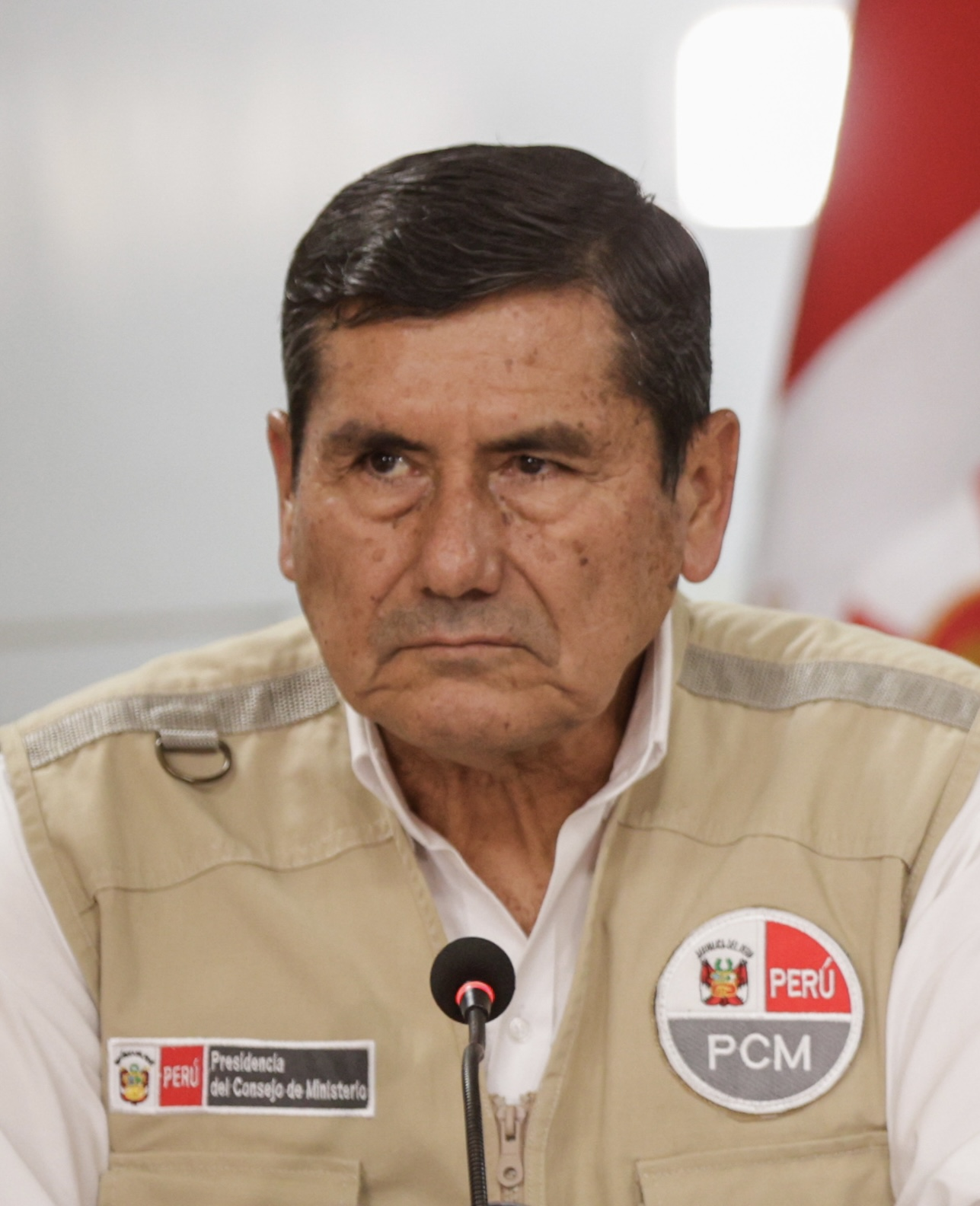
- Arroyo in 2026

Prime Minister of Peru
- In office 17 March 2026 – 28 July 2026
- President: José María Balcázar
- Preceded by: Denisse Miralles
- Succeeded by: Luis Galarreta

Minister of Defense
- In office 14 October 2025 – 17 March 2026
- President: José Jerí; José María Balcázar
- Prime Minister: Ernesto Álvarez; Denisse Miralles
- Preceded by: César Díaz Peche
- Succeeded by: Carlos Díaz Dañino

Personal details
- Born: Luis Enrique Arroyo Sánchez; 10 November 1956 (age 69) Ascope, Peru
- Party: Independent
- Education: Chorrillos Military School

Military service
- Branch/service: Peruvian Army
- Rank: Major General

Luis Enrique Arroyo Sánchez (Note: In this Hispanic American name, the first or paternal surname is Arroyo and the second or maternal family name is Sánchez.) (born 10 November 1956) is a Peruvian politician and retired major general who served as Prime Minister of Peru from 17 March 2026 to 28 July 2026.

== Early life and career ==
Arroyo retired from the military as a major general. During his service, he "commanded the Third Army Division in Arequipa and the Fifth Division in Iquitos, served in the Valle de los Ríos Apurímac, Ene y Mantaro counterinsurgency zone, and directed the Army War College".

He was appointed as the Ministry of Defense during the José Jerí government and briefly served in that role at José María Balcázar's first cabinet. Between 5 November 2025 and 24 February 2026, Arroyo served as chief of the National Civil Defense Institute.

== Premiership (2026) ==
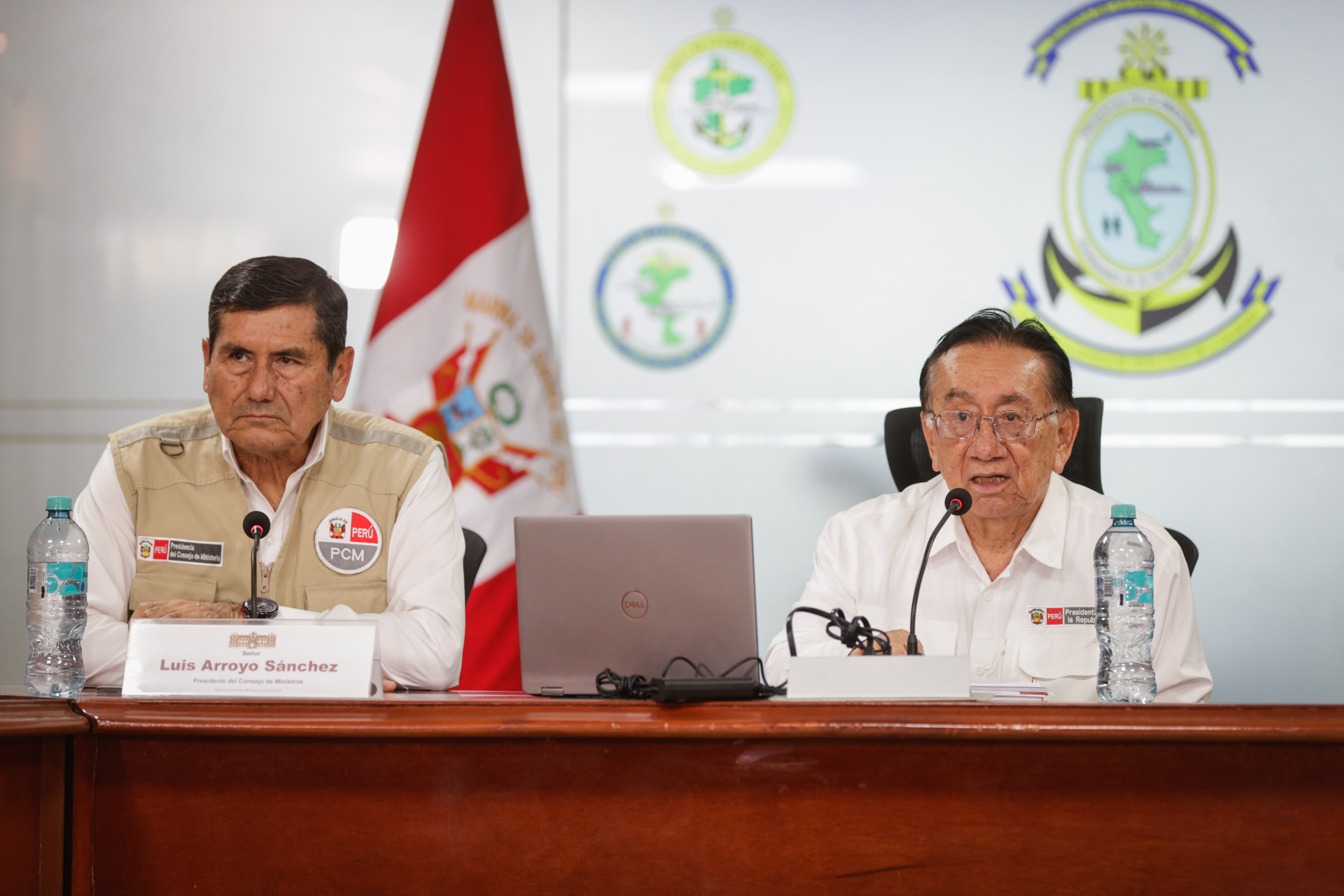
Arroyo in a meeting with President José María Balcázar (2026)

President José María Balcázar appointed Arroyo as prime minister after Denisse Miralles stepped down from the position after serving for three weeks. Arroyo kept the most ministers from the Miralles cabinet, except for five ministries, including the Ministry of Defense where he previously served as minister at before his premiership.

== Notes ==
Political offices
Preceded by César Díaz Peche	Minister of Defense; 2025–2026	Succeeded by Carlos Díaz Dañino
Preceded by Denisse Miralles	Prime Minister of Peru; 2026	Succeeded by Luis Galarreta
