= Carlos Díaz Dañino =

Peruvian military officer

Minister of Defense of Peru
- In office 17 March 2026 – 22 April 2026
- President: José María Balcázar
- Prime Minister: Luis Arroyo Sánchez
- Preceded by: Luis Arroyo Sánchez
- Succeeded by: Amadeo Flores Carcagno

Personal details
- Education: Chorrillos Military School

Carlos Alberto Francisco Díaz Dañino is a retired Peruvian military officer with the rank of brigadier general. He served as Minister of Defense of Peru from 17 March to 22 April 2026, during the government of José María Balcázar.

== Biography ==
He belongs to the 1988 "Héroes de San Juan y Miraflores" class of the Chorrillos Military School. He holds a degree in military science and a doctorate in Management and Development, as well as master's degrees in geopolitics, National Defense, and Administration.

On 22 April 2026, Díaz resigned as defense minister along with foreign minister Hugo de Zela in protest against president José María Balcázar's decision to defer a purchase agreement to buy 24 F-16 fighter jets from the United States pending the result of the 2026 Peruvian general election.
