= Denisse Miralles =

Prime Minister of Peru in 2026

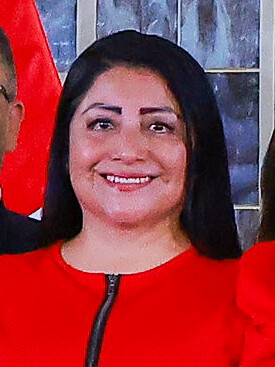
- Miralles in 2025

Prime Minister of Peru
- In office 24 February 2026 – 17 March 2026
- President: José María Balcázar
- Preceded by: Ernesto Álvarez Miranda
- Succeeded by: Luis Arroyo Sánchez

Minister of Economy and Finance
- In office 13 October 2025 – 24 February 2026
- President: José Jerí; José María Balcázar
- Prime Minister: Ernesto Álvarez Miranda
- Preceded by: Raúl Pérez-Reyes
- Succeeded by: Gerardo López Gonzales

Personal details
- Born: Denisse Azucena Miralles; 8 November 1976 (age 49) Lima, Peru
- Party: Independent
- Education: National University of Engineering; Yokohama National University (Master's degree)
- Profession: Politician, engineer, economist

Denisse Azucena Miralles (born 8 November 1976) is a Peruvian engineer, economist and politician who served as the Prime Minister of Peru for 21 days in 2026. She previously served as the Minister of Economy and Finance between 2025 and 2026.

== Education ==
Miralles first went to the National University of Engineering. She then went to the Yokohama National University in Yokohama where she received a master's degree. Afterwards, she studied infrastructure at the Harvard Kennedy School. She also went to the University of the Pacific, and worked at the Development Bank of Latin America.

== Career ==
Miralles was appointed the Minister of Economy and Finance in October 2025 under former President José Jerí. She was sworn in the same day.

Miralles was appointed the Prime Minister in February 2026. She was picked over presidential candidate Hernando de Soto. She resigned on 17 March 2026 before a confirmatory vote could be taken in Congress.

Political offices
Preceded by Raúl Pérez-Reyes	Minister of Economy and Finance; 2025–2026	Succeeded by Gerardo López Gonzales
Preceded by Ernesto Álvarez Miranda	Prime Minister of Peru; 2026	Succeeded by Luis Arroyo Sánchez
