= José María Balcázar =

President of Peru in 2026

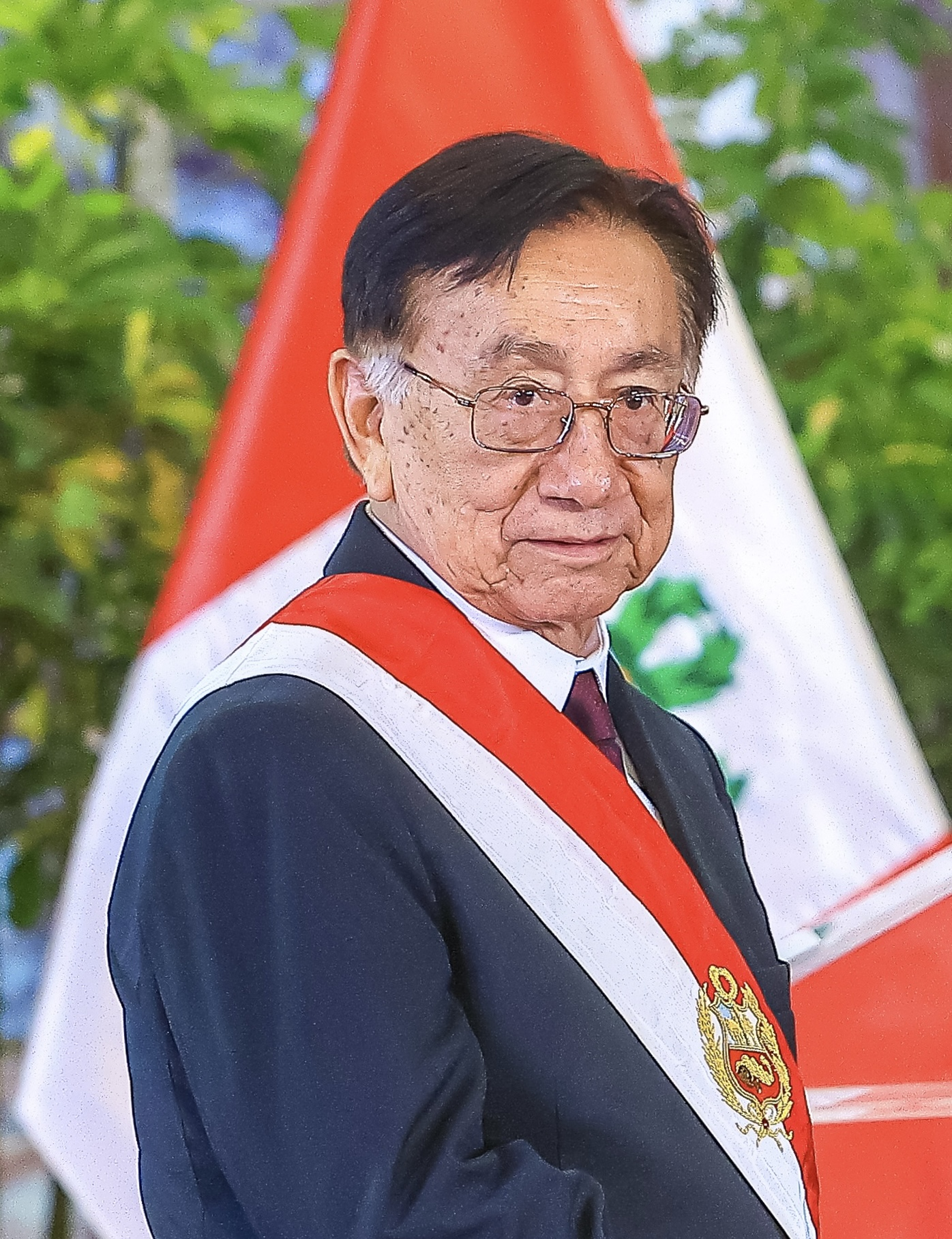
- Balcázar in 2026

President of Peru
- In office 18 February 2026 – 28 July 2026
- Prime Minister: Ernesto Álvarez; Denisse Miralles; Luis Arroyo Sánchez
- Vice President: First Vice President Vacant; Second Vice President Vacant
- Preceded by: José Jerí
- Succeeded by: Keiko Fujimori

President of Congress
- In office 18 February 2026 (Note: de jure: 18 February 2026 – 26 July 2026; On 18 February 2026, as soon as he was elected President of the Congress of the Republic, he immediately ascended into the presidency of Peru. As a result, he kept all roles in the Congress of the Republic by law. However, all his powers and duties in the Congress were suspended since the day he took the presidency, meaning a by fact removal from the Congress of Peru.)
- Vice President: 1st Vice President; Fernando Rospigliosi; 2nd Vice President; Waldemar Cerrón; 3rd Vice President; Ilich López
- Preceded by: Fernando Rospigliosi (a.i.)
- Succeeded by: Fernando Rospigliosi (a.i.)

Member of Congress
- In office 27 July 2021 – 18 February 2026
- Constituency: Lambayeque

Personal details
- Born: José María Balcázar Zelada; 17 January 1943 (age 83) Nánchoc, Cajamarca, Peru
- Party: Independent (2022–2025, 2026–present)
- Other political affiliations: Now Nation (2025–2026); Bicentennial Peru (2022–2024); Free Peru (2020–2022)
- Spouse: Blanca Quiroz
- Children: 4
- Education: National University of Trujillo
- Occupation: Politician; lawyer; judge
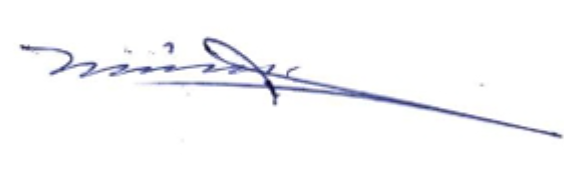
- Signature

José María Balcázar Zelada (born 17 January 1943) is a Peruvian politician and lawyer who served as the president of Peru from 18 February to 28 July 2026. First elected to Congress of Peru as a member of the Free Peru party in 2021, he resigned his membership in 2022 and helped found Bicentennial Peru, a parliamentary bloc of dissident Free Peru congresspeople. He returned to the Free Peru caucus in 2024 but remains as an independent, after Bicentennial Peru's dissolution. He was briefly a member of Alfonso López-Chau's party, Now Nation, until he was expelled in early 2026.

Following the censure and removal of José Jerí from the presidency on 17 February 2026, Balcázar was elected as president of Congress and in turn voted in as president of Peru the following day. Balcázar has faced controversy in his political career, including criminal investigations related to allegations of illicit appropriation of funds, his links to Patricia Benavides during the Peruvian Public Ministry controversy, and criticism of his views on child marriage.

== Early life ==
Balcázar was born on 17 January 1943 in Nánchoc, Cajamarca, Peru. He studied law at the National University of Trujillo, graduating in 1972. In 2005, he obtained a doctorate in law and political science from Pedro Ruiz Gallo National University. He also worked as a professor at the law school at the national university since 1977.

== Legal career ==
Balcázar was a senior member of the Superior Court of Justice of Lambayeque. He was a provisional supreme member of the Supreme Court of Peru, where he served as a judge of the Permanent Civil Chamber. However, in August 2004, after vacating a cassation ruling issued by the chamber's previous members in 2003—thereby violating the legal principle of res judicata (claim preclusion)—he was subjected to disciplinary proceedings by the then National Council of the Judiciary of Peru (CNM). This led to his temporary removal in 2006. While these proceedings were ongoing, he also faced scrutiny for the July 2005 release of the Wolfenson brothers—associates of Vladimiro Montesinos and owners of the newspapers La Razón and El Chino. This release was based on an unconstitutional law, a decision that his own chamber eventually retracted. Following years of delays, he was officially removed from the bench in 2011 after the CNM declined to ratify him. The council cited two primary reasons: his prior disciplinary record and the poor legal reasoning demonstrated during his ratification interview, which failed to meet the standards required for the position.

In 2019, he was elected dean of the Illustrious Bar Association of Lambayeque (ICAL) for a two-year term (2019–2020). He was later expelled in 2022 and investigated for the crime of misappropriation of the institution's funds, which has resulted in criminal and civil proceedings in Lambayeque. His expulsion from the association was ratified at the end of 2024.

During his administration as Dean of the Lambayeque bar association, he was accused of misappropriating approximately two million peruvian soles (approximately US$600,000) by requesting that the association's income be deposited into his personal bank accounts. As a result, he is currently facing ongoing legal proceedings. Furthermore, he was expelled from the Bar Association in 2022, a decision that was ratified in December 2024.

== Political career ==
For the 2021 general election, Balcázar was announced as a candidate for Congress of the Republic of Peru to represent the Department of Lambayeque for the left-wing Free Peru Party. Balcázar was elected congressman, with 6641 votes during the election. Balcázar ran to join the Board of Directors of Congress in 2021, but was not successful. He also unsuccessfully ran for President of the Congress of Peru in 2022.

Balcázar faced criticism for his involvement in the controversy surrounding former prosecutor Patricia Benavides. Canal N reported that Balcázar provided Benavides' advisors his daughter-in-law's curriculum vitae and that she was later given a position in the Prosecutor's Office. He aligned with far-right members of congress amidst the Peruvian Public Ministry controversy, supporting the dissolution of the National Board of Justice, which was investigating Benavides for heading a criminal organization.

During his tenure in congress, Balcázar has received criticism for some of his views. In 2023, he argued against the criminalization of child marriage by stating that, without violence, such marriages would benefit a young girl's mental development. He also spoke favourably about sexual relationships between students and teachers.

Balcázar resigned from the Peru Libre caucus in June 2022 and formed the Bicentennial Peru caucus, a left-wing caucus. Following the dissolution of the caucus in 2024, he subsequently returned to Free Peru party caucus, but remained without party affiliation. Balcázar joined the Now Nation party in January 2025, but was expelled from the party in February 2026. He did not run for re-election in the 2026 general election.

== Presidency (2026) ==
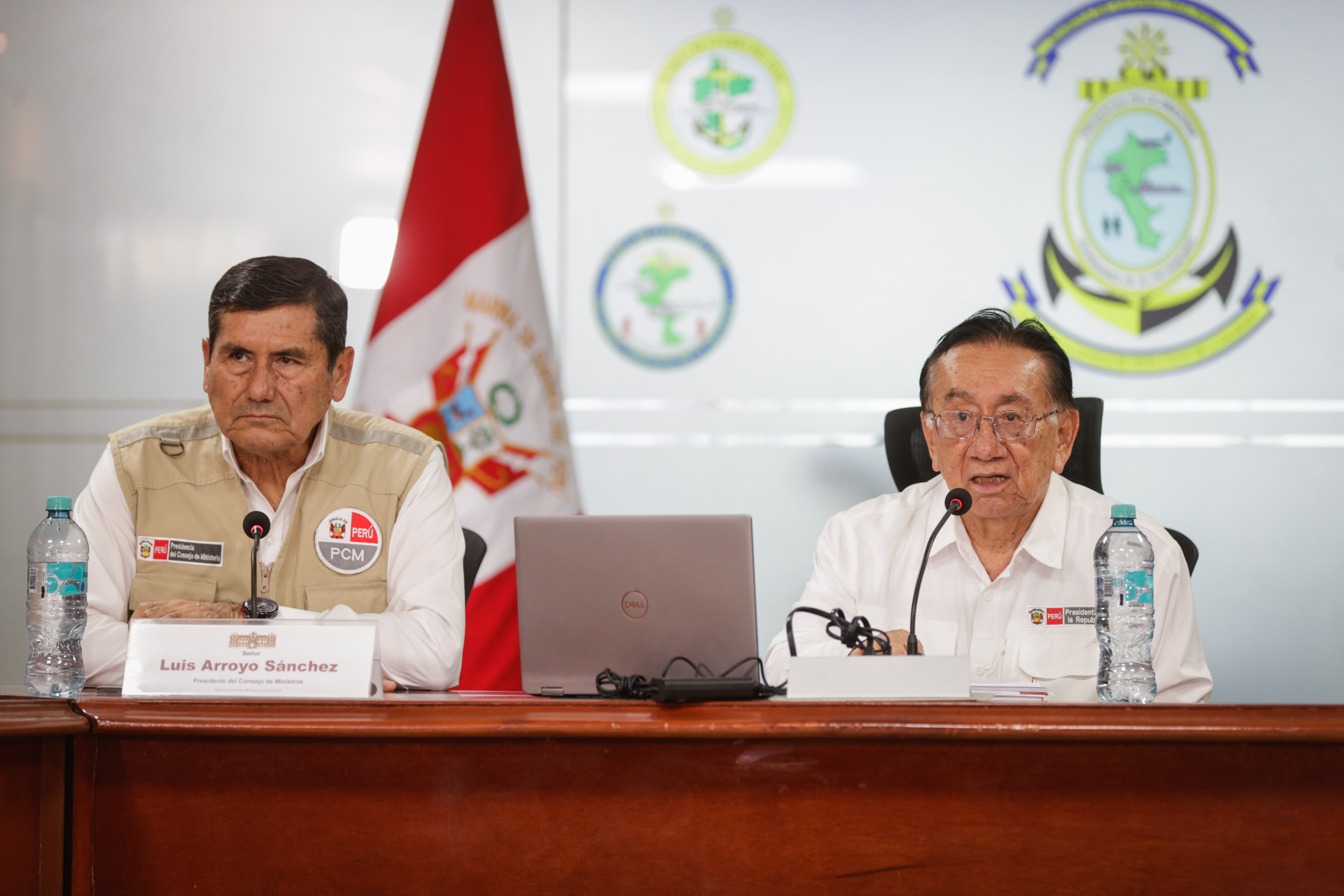
Balcázar during a cabinet meeting with Prime Minister Luis Arroyo Sánchez (2026)

On 18 February 2026, following the censure and removal of President José Jerí, Balcázar was nominated by Free Peru for President of Congress and for the presidency of Peru. After several hours of voting, he was elected president by the Congress with 60 votes in the final ballot, defeating Congresswoman Maricarmen Alva of the Popular Action party. At 83, Balcázar is the oldest person to ever be sworn in as president of Peru.

On 22 February, his government announced that economist Hernando de Soto would serve as the next prime minister. However, two days later, his appointment was cancelled and Denisse Miralles was sworn in as prime minister instead.

In April 2026, Balcázar deferred an agreement between Peru and the United States to purchase 24 F-16 fighter jets pending the result of the 2026 Peruvian general election, saying that he did not have the legitimacy as interim leader to follow through on the deal. In response, both the defense minister Carlos Díaz and the foreign minister Hugo de Zela resigned in protest.

On 23 April, Third Vice President of Congress, Ilich López announced his intention to propose a motion of censure against President Balcázar, aiming to remove him from his de jure role as President of Congress and subsequently his role as President of Peru.

On 28 April, while speaking at a ceremony for the Chamber of Commerce of Lima, Balcázar said that Jewish people were partially responsible for pushing Nazi Germany into World War II, drawing condemnation from both German and Israeli embassies in Peru.

Balcázar's tenure as president ended on 28 July, and he was succeeded by Keiko Fujimori.

== Notes ==
Political offices
Preceded by José Jerí	President of Peru; 2026	Succeeded by Keiko Fujimori
