= Ernesto Álvarez Miranda =

Prime Minister of Peru from 2025 to 2026

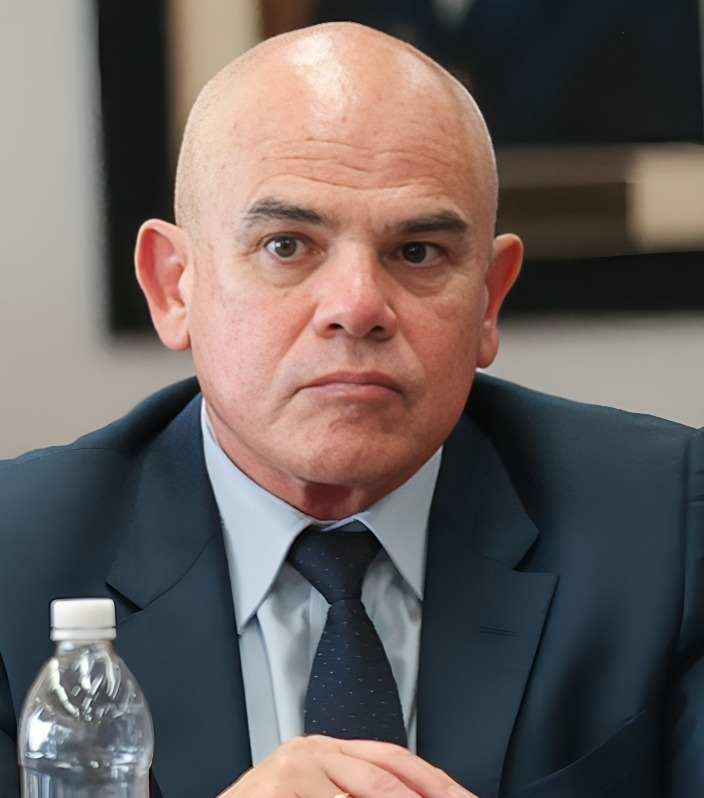
- Álvarez Miranda in 2026

Prime Minister of Peru
- In office 14 October 2025 – 24 February 2026
- President: José Jerí; José María Balcázar
- Preceded by: Eduardo Arana Ysa
- Succeeded by: Denisse Miralles

Minister of Justice and Human Rights
- Incumbent
- Assumed office 28 July 2026
- President: Keiko Fujimori
- Prime Minister: Luis Galarreta
- Preceded by: Luis Jiménez Borra

President of the Constitutional Court
- In office 12 January 2012 – 12 February 2013
- Vice President: Óscar Urviola
- Preceded by: Carlos Mesía
- Succeeded by: Óscar Urviola

Magistrate of the Constitutional Court
- In office 6 September 2007 – 3 June 2014
- Appointed by: Peruvian Congress
- Preceded by: Carlos Mesía
- Succeeded by: Óscar Urviola

Dean of the University of San Martín de Porres School of Law
- Incumbent
- Assumed office 16 November 2014
- Preceded by: Rubén Sanabria Ortiz

Personal details
- Born: Ernesto Julio Álvarez Miranda; 21 May 1961 (age 65) Lima, Peru
- Party: PPC
- Education: University of San Martín de Porres (LLB, PhD)
- Profession: Jurist

Ernesto Julio Álvarez Miranda (born 21 May 1961) is a Peruvian jurist and academic who served as the Prime Minister of Peru from October 2025 to February 2026 during the presidency of José Jerí. He currently serves as Minister of Justice and Human Rights under Keiko Fujimori. A ranking member of the Christian People's Party, he serves as chair of the party's advisory council since 2023. The Associated Press described him as having ultraconservative political views.

Prior to his stint in government, he served as an associate justice of the Constitutional Court of Peru between 2007 and 2014, serving as president of the Court during 2012.

He is a columnist for the newspapers Expreso and El Montonero.

Political offices
| Preceded by Eduardo Arana Ysa | Prime Minister of Peru; 2025–2026 | Succeeded by Denisse Miralles |
| Preceded by Luis Jiménez Borra | Minister of Justice and Human Rights; 2026–present | Incumbent |
