= José Jerí =

President of Peru from 2025 to 2026

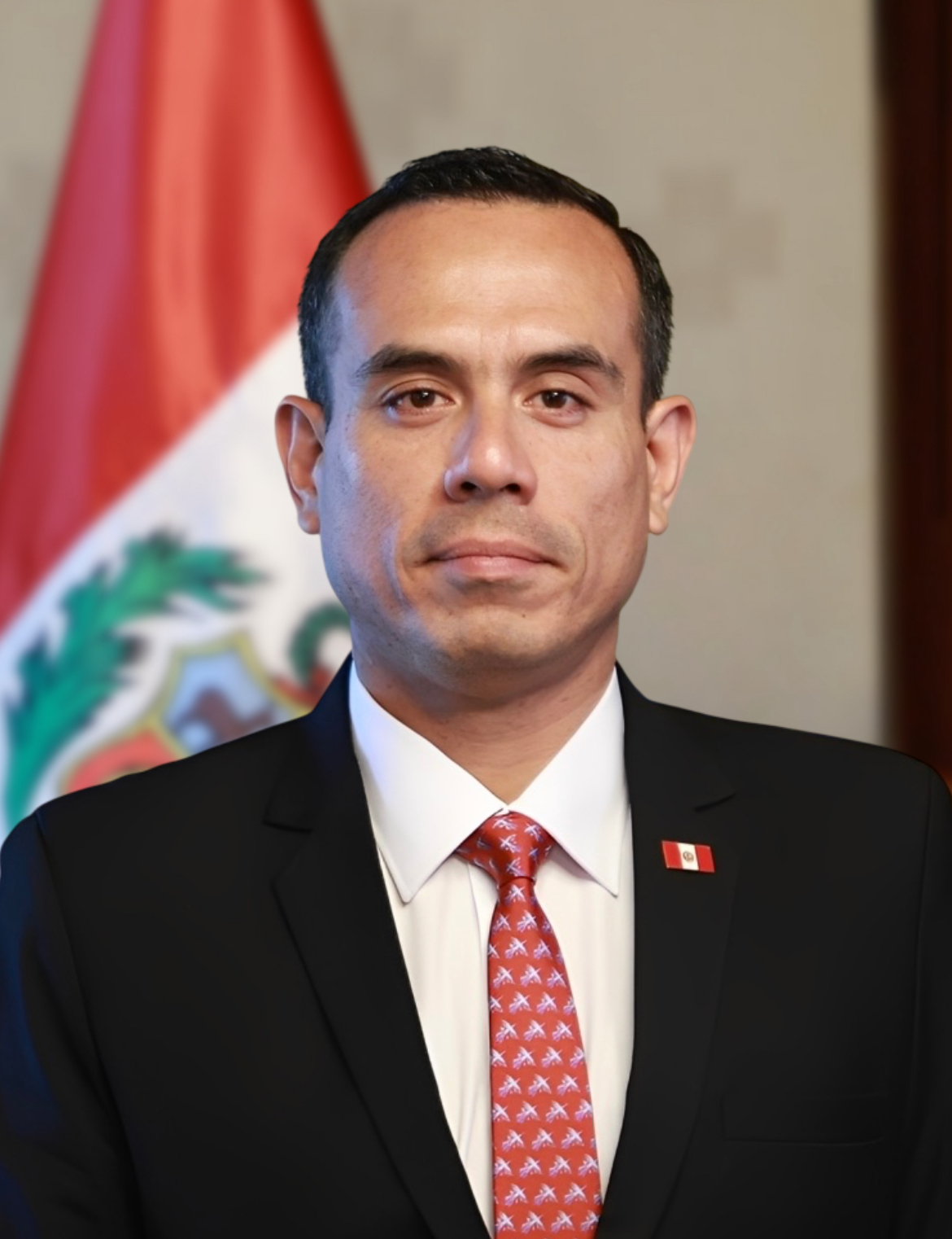
- Official portrait, 2025

President of Peru
- In office 10 October 2025 – 17 February 2026
- Prime Minister: Eduardo Arana Ysa; Ernesto Álvarez
- Vice President: First Vice President Vacant; Second Vice President Vacant
- Preceded by: Dina Boluarte
- Succeeded by: José María Balcázar

President of Congress
- In office 27 July 2025 – 10 October 2025 (Note: On Leave: 10 October 2025 – 17 February 2026; Ascended into the presidency of Peru on 10 October 2025 as the President of Congress. His roles in the Congress of the Republic was immediately suspended as soon as he took the presidency.)
- Vice President: 1st Vice President; Fernando Rospigliosi; 2nd Vice President; Waldemar Cerrón; 3rd Vice President; Ilich López
- Preceded by: Eduardo Salhuana
- Succeeded by: Fernando Rospigliosi (a.i.)

Member of Congress
- In office 17 February 2026 – 26 July 2026
- Constituency: Lima
- In office 27 July 2021 – 10 October 2025
- Preceded by: Martín Vizcarra
- Constituency: Lima

Personal details
- Born: José Enrique Jerí Oré; 13 November 1986 (age 39) Lima, Peru
- Other political affiliations: Independent (before 2014) We Are Peru (2014–2026)
- Education: Federico Villarreal National University (LLB); Inca Garcilaso de la Vega University (JD)

José Enrique Jerí Oré (Note: Spanish pronunciation: [xoˈse enˈrike xeˈɾi oˈɾe].) (born 13 November 1986) is a Peruvian politician and lawyer who served as the president of Peru from 2025 until his removal on 17 February 2026, following the impeachment and removal of his predecessor Dina Boluarte. Prior to assuming the presidency, Jerí was president of the Congress of the Republic from July to October 2025, having been a member of Congress of the Republic representing Lima for the We Are Peru party since 2021. He was the tenth Peruvian president to hold office in less than a decade, and, at the age of 38, the third youngest and the first millennial to serve as President of Peru.

First elected to the Congress of the Republic as an alternate for Martín Vizcarra, who had been disqualified from his seat for allegedly jumping the line to get a COVID-19 vaccine ("Vacunagate"), Jerí held office as a member of the centrist We Are Peru party. On 26 July 2025, he was elected as President of the Congress of the Republic for the 2025–2026 annual session period with the votes of Free Peru, Popular Force, Alliance for Progress, Acción Popular, Avanza País, and We Are Peru.

After the unanimous impeachment and removal of Boluarte on 10 October 2025 amidst the 2025 Peruvian protests, Jerí assumed the presidency in his capacity as head of the legislative branch. In his inaugural speech, Jerí pledged to "install and lead a government of transition, empathy, and national reconciliation", and said that the nation "must declare war on crime".

The Peruvian Congress approved the censuring of Jerí from the position of president of Peru under a vote of no confidence on 12 February 2026. Unlike impeachment, which requires a supermajority of 26 in the 120-member legislature, censuring strips him of his title as head of Congress with a simple majority. His interim status was then used to remove him from the presidency. Jerí became the sixth president removed by Congress after Guillermo Billinghurst (1914), Alberto Fujimori (2001), Martín Vizcarra (2020), Pedro Castillo (2022), and Boluarte (2025). He was the fourth president to be removed in the 2020s.

== Early life and education ==
José Jerí was born on 13 November 1986, in the Jesús María District, located in the city of Lima. He graduated from the Federico Villarreal National University (UNFV), where he earned his bachelor's degree in law in 2014. The following year, he earned his law degree from the Inca Garcilaso de la Vega University.

He held various positions in the Ancash Regional Government from 2020 to 2021, also serving as Secretary General. He was an advisor to the We Are Peru caucus in the Congress of the Republic in 2020.

== Political career ==
Since 2013, he has been affiliated with the political party We Are Peru. As a member, he served as youth secretary and alternate legal representative. He is currently the party's first vice president since September 2021.

His first political participation took place in the 2013 Lima municipal elections as a candidate for the Lima Municipality council with the backing of Fernando Andrade, though Jerí was not elected. He ran again unsuccessfully in the 2014 elections. From November 2015 to April 2016, he was a delegate and member of the Alliance for the Progress of Peru coalition led by César Acuña because the party he belonged to, We Are Peru, was a member of said electoral alliance.

=== Congressman of the Republic ===
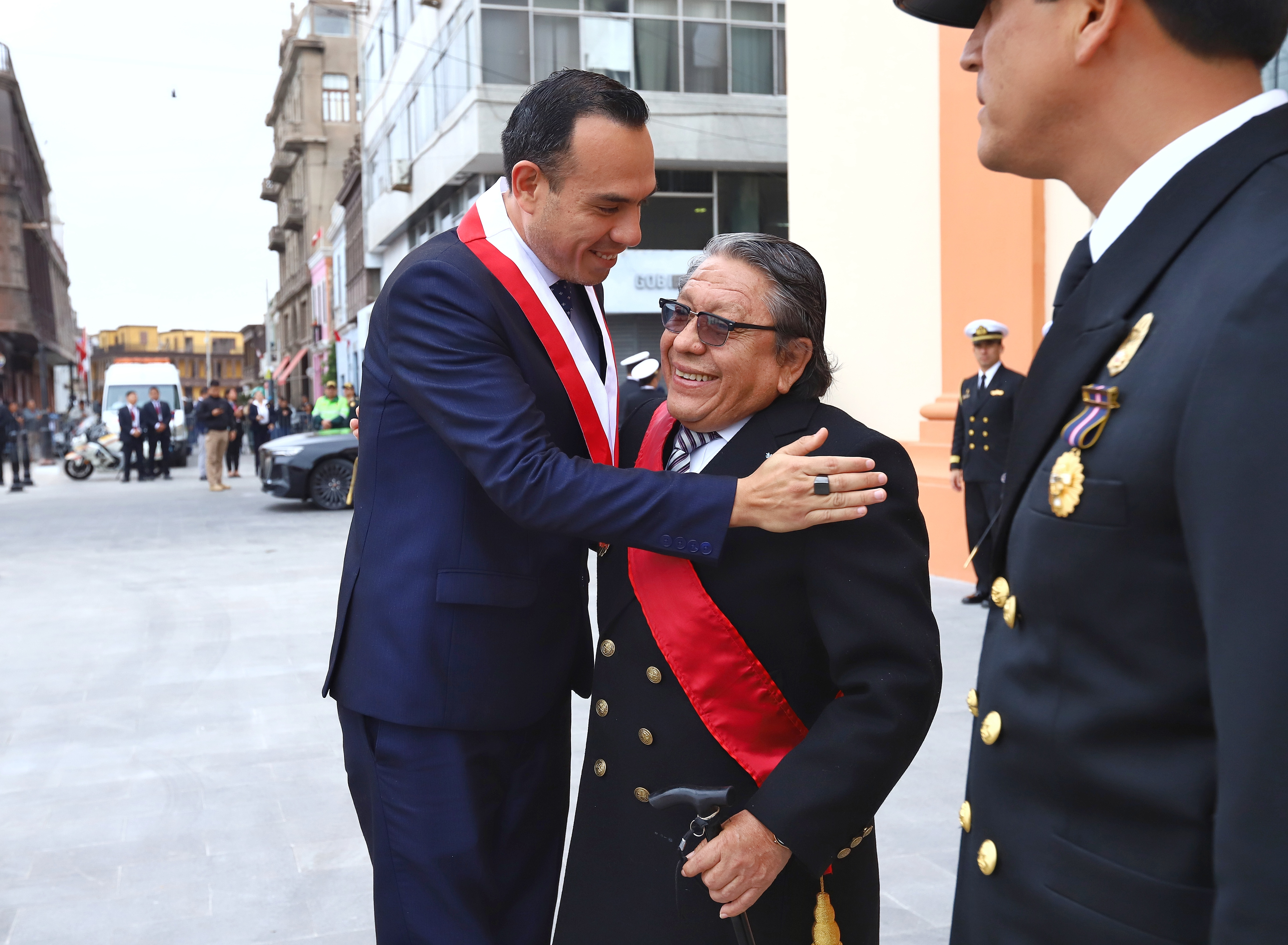
Jerí as member of Congress (October 2025)

In the 2021 parliamentary elections, José Jerí ran for the Congress of the Republic on behalf of We Are Peru in the Lima Metropolitan electoral list of, running as number 3 on the candidate list. Despite obtaining only 11,654 preferential votes, Jerí managed to be elected as a congressman of the republic for the 2021–2026 parliamentary term due to the disqualification of winning candidate Martín Vizcarra, a former president who obtained 208,387 preferential votes in the election, from holding any public office.

In July 2021, he ran for president of Congress for the 2021–2022 term, but was unsuccessful.

During the third presidential impeachment process against Pedro Castillo, Jerí voted in favour of declaring moral incapacity of Pedro Castillo. The vacancy was approved by 101 parliamentarians on 7 December 2022. In February 2022, during the third wave of the COVID-19 pandemic in Peru, Jerí was photographed entering a bar in the Miraflores district with a young woman who worked as an assistant in his congressional office, to celebrate the birthday of Claudia Llanos Vidal, an official from the municipality of La Molina. According to reports, Jerí was seen drinking with guests and disregarding social-distancing rules despite a decree from the Presidency of the Council of Ministers enforcing restrictions due to the pandemic.

He served as president of the Budget Committee during the 2023–2024 legislative year. He served as spokesperson for the We Are Peru party. He was one of the congressmen who supported the dismissal of the fiscal investigations into Dina Boluarte.

In January 2025, Jerí was formally accused of sexual assault following a New Year's Eve party in Canta. The alleged incident took place at the Santa Rosa Casa Club in Quives on 29 December 2024, where Jerí was with a group of friends. Among the guests was Marco Antonio Cardoza Hurtado, who had arrived with a 31-year-old woman (the complainant) and another person. According to the complainant, she lost consciousness that afternoon and later woke up with pain in her intimate parts. The complaint identified both Jerí and Cardoza as suspects.

The Civil Court of Canta admitted the complaint, issued protective measures for the alleged victim, and ordered Jerí to undergo psychological treatment for impulsive and pathological sexual behavior. Despite being temporarily suspended by his party, he reportedly failed to comply with the court order for more than five months. As a result, Attorney General Delia Espinoza filed a separate complaint for disobedience to authority, citing Article 368 of the Criminal Code.

==== President of Congress ====
On 26 July 2025, he was elected as President of the Congress of the Republic for the 2025–2026 annual session period with the votes of Free Peru, Popular Force, Alliance for Progress, Acción Popular, Avanza País and We Are Peru.

Following his controversial election as President of Congress due to his background, Jerí stated in an interview with the Peruvian newspaper El Comercio in August that he would refrain from assuming the presidency of the executive branch, according to the constitutional line of succession, in the event that Boluarte were removed from office by Congress. He expressed the following for such a scenario (translated from Spanish):

"I was elected to be President of Congress. I'm not going to say I'm unaware of the procedures of constitutional succession, right? But from my perspective, the presidency should be constitutionally renewed on July 28, 2026. If that scenario you mention were to occur, I would personally refrain from assuming it."

Shortly after being named president of Congress, the television program Milagros Leiva, entrevista reported an alleged case of illicit enrichment involving Jerí, noting a sharp increase in his declared assets. In 2021 he declared ownership of two vehicles worth S/ 97,000 soles, but by 2024 he reportedly owned properties valued at more than one million soles. The investigative television program Panorama also alleged that Jerí had received a bribe of S/ 150,000 soles from a businesswoman named Blanca Ríos. The alleged payment took place in November 2023, when Jerí chaired the congressional budget committee, in connection with the approval of public works projects under the portfolio of the Ministry of Economy and Finance. According to Ríos's testimony, the payment was made to secure funding for an irrigation project in the Cajamarca region. The case also implicated congresswoman Ana Zegarra, spokesperson for the We Are Peru party, and Nahum Hidalgo, an advisor to the Somos Perú parliamentary group. Jerí denied the accusation, stating he had no connection with the person involved and declared that he would cooperate with all investigations.

On 12 August 2025, the Public Prosecutor's Office, now led by Tomás Gálvez, dismissed the case against Jerí for the alleged sexual assault after determining there was insufficient evidence to proceed. It was also reported that Cardoza Hurtado, the other suspect, had left Peru for France on 4 February 2025 without notifying prosecutors and failed to appear for the collection of biological samples.

== Presidency (2025–2026) ==
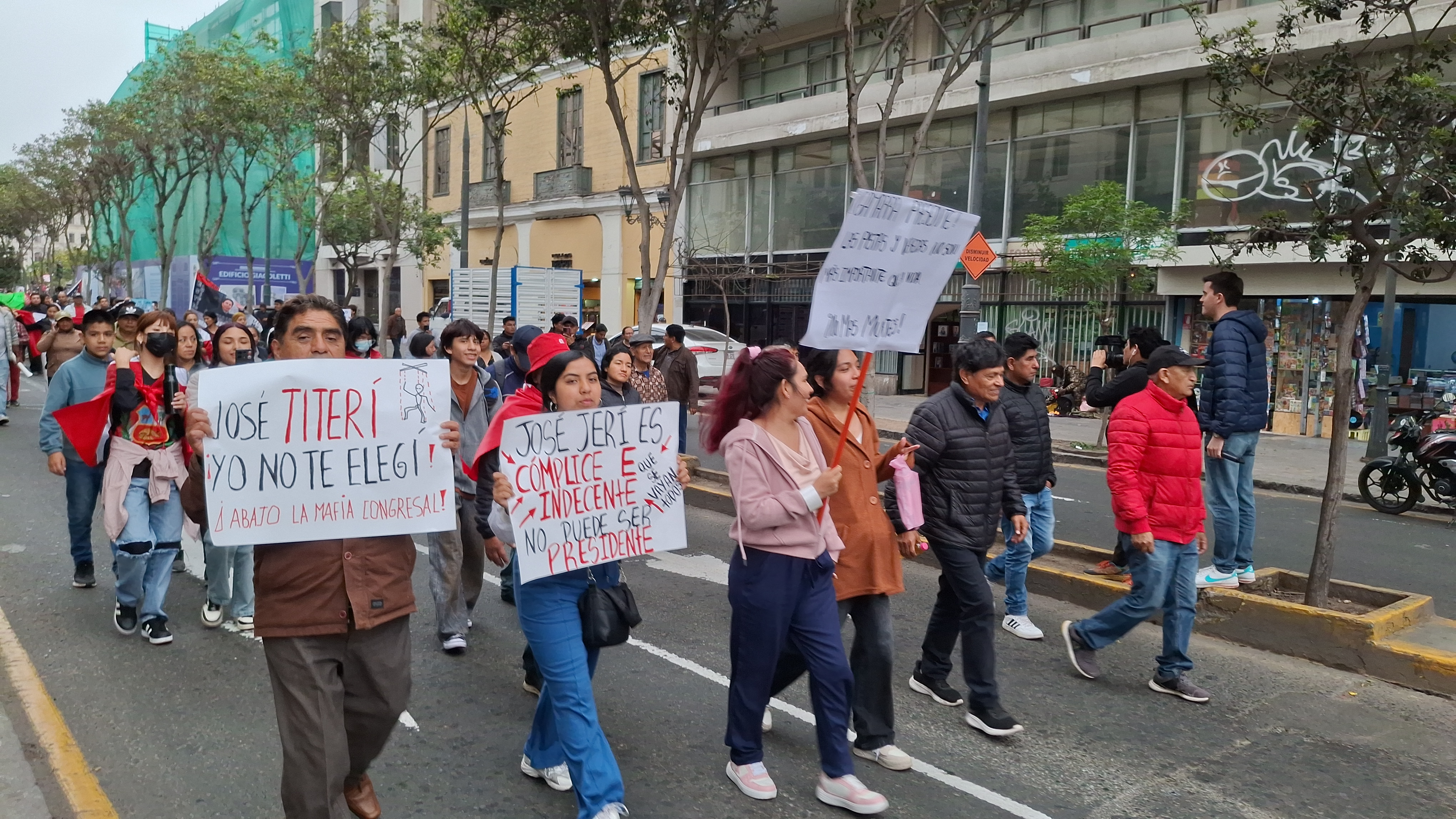
Peruvians protesting on 15 October 2025

Amidst the 2025 Peruvian protests and after the unanimous impeachment and removal of Dina Boluarte on 10 October 2025, owing to persistent political scandals throughout her presidency and a mismanaged crime wave earlier in the month, José Jerí immediately ascended as President of Peru. With Boluarte having no vice presidents, Jerí, as president of the legislature, stood next in the line of succession established in the Peruvian Constitution. He became the eighth individual to serve as president since the resignation of Pedro Pablo Kuczynski in 2018, a span of just over seven years.

Shortly after being named president, Jerí's social media history was ridiculed for previously misogynistic posts and he was observed unfollowing pornographic accounts on Instagram.

In his inaugural speech, Jerí pledged to "install and lead a government of transition, empathy, and national reconciliation", and said that the nation "must declare war on crime".

Despite the removal of President Dina Boluarte, the Congress of the Republic rejected a motion of censure against prime minister Eduardo Arana Ysa, meaning that the Boluarte cabinet carried over into the presidency of José Jerí.

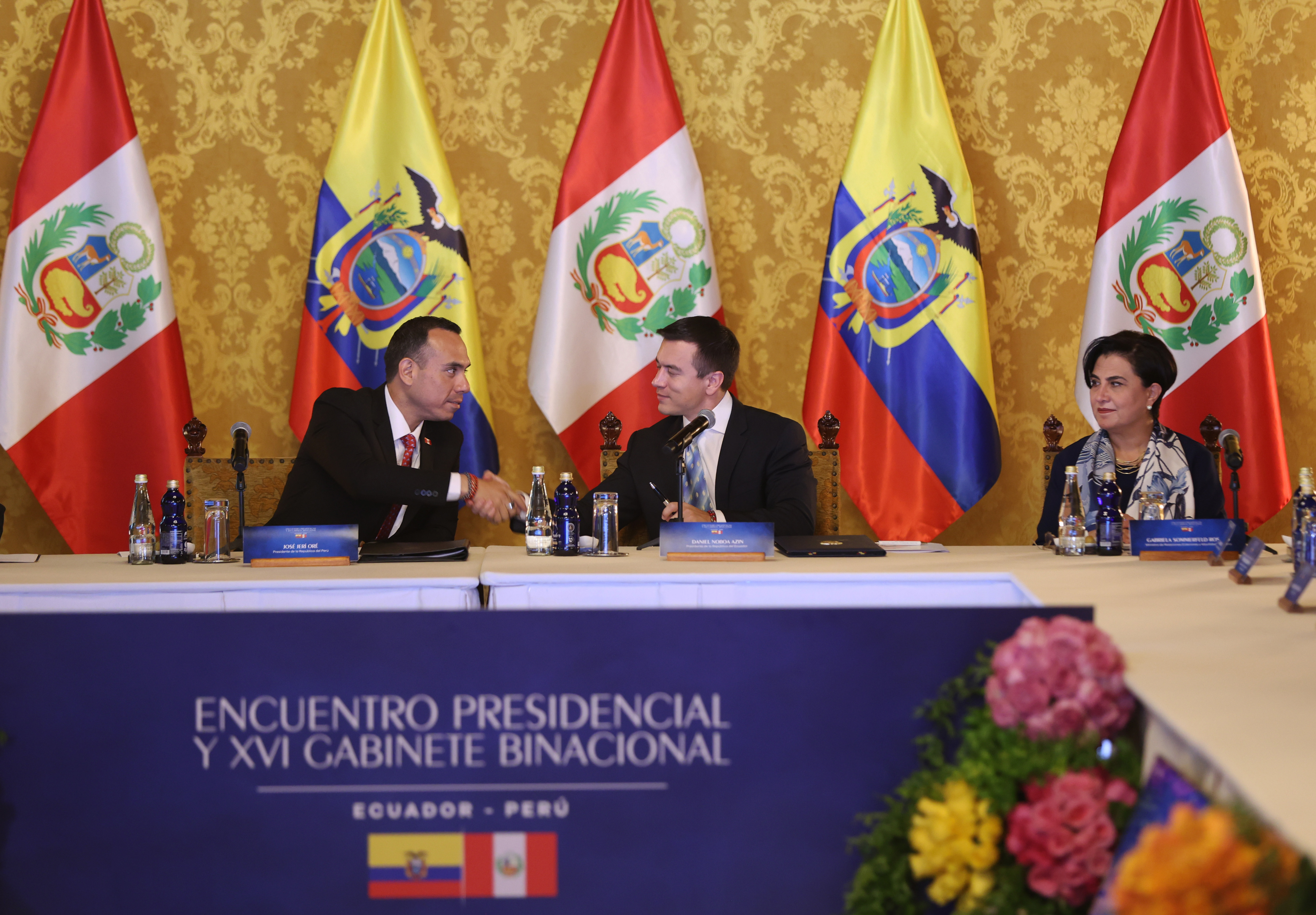
Jerí with Ecuadorian President Daniel Noboa on 12 December 2025

Protests against Jerí grew due to allegations of sexual assault. He refused to resign, stating "My responsibility is to maintain the stability of the country."

On 15 October, massive demonstrations in major cities across the country denounced the explosion of crime and "corrupt elites", demanding the resignation of the president and Congress. In Lima, the protest ended in violence. One protester was killed by a plainclothes police officer and around 100 people were injured. The government declared a state of emergency on 21 October, officially to combat crime but, according to its critics, to prevent the protests from continuing.

On 28 November, Jerí declared a state of emergency in areas along the Chile–Peru border in response to an influx of migrants exiting Chile, predominantly Venezuelans. Large numbers of Venezuelans attempted to leave Chile and enter Peru following threats of mass expulsion from Chilean President-elect José Antonio Kast.

=== Censure ===
On 14 February 2026, it was announced that Jerí was under investigation for illicit enrichment for a second time. He was accused of influence peddling after the revelation of secretive meetings with Chinese businessmen outside of any official framework. Three days later, on 17 February, Jerí was removed from the presidency by the Peruvian Congress in a 75–24 vote, with 3 abstentions, following a motion of censure approved weeks before the general elections. He was removed as President of Congress after he failed to disclose meetings with Chinese businessmen who were under government scrutiny. He was only president for four months. José María Balcázar was sworn in as his successor.

== Political views ==
Jerí is described as conservative, populist and pragmatic. Jerí describes himself as neither right nor left but rather as supportive of pragmatic politics. Jerí supports animal rights. He is in favour of economic liberalism, which can be seen in his economic policies where he is pro-deregulation, as well as pro-private investment.

== Notes ==
Political offices
Preceded by Eduardo Salhuana	President of Congress; 2025	Succeeded by Fernando Rospigliosi; Acting
Preceded by Dina Boluarte	President of Peru; 2025–2026	Succeeded by José María Balcázar
