= Opinion polling for the 2026 Peruvian general election =

Opinion polling for the Peruvian General election, 2026

In the Peruvian electoral system, a candidate is proclaimed winner only after they obtain more than 50% of valid votes. If no candidates achieve that percentage in the first electoral round, the two candidates with the most votes participate in a second round or ballot. Peruvian electoral law prohibits the dissemination of polls in the week prior to the day of the electoral suffrage.

In the run-up to the 2026 Peruvian general election, various organizations conduct opinion polls to measure the intention to vote in Peru in the previous period. The results of these surveys are shown in this article. The date range for these opinion polls is from the runoff of the 2021 Peruvian general election, held on 6 June, to the present. Voting intention estimates refer mainly to a hypothetical election of the President of the Republic. Intent polls and mock ballots are listed in reverse chronological order, showing the most recent first and using the dates the poll was conducted in the field rather than the date of publication. When fieldwork dates are unknown, the publication date is given instead.

== Presidential election ==
=== Second round ===
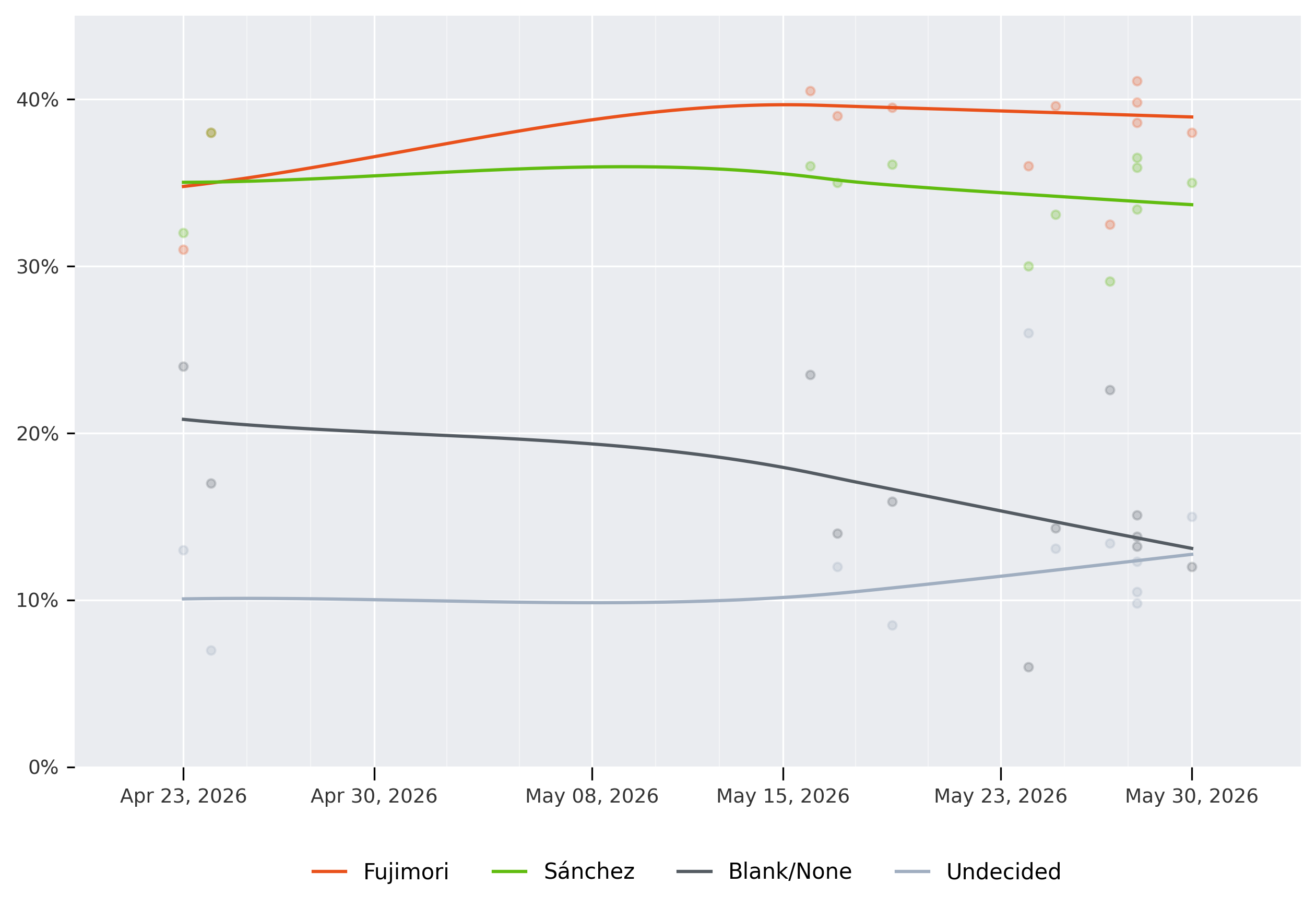
Trend lines of the voting intention polls for the second round.

Legend:

Poll performed during the blackout of polling information.

Pollster / Client	Sample size	Margin of error	Date	Keiko Fujimori		Blank/None	Undecided	Lead
Pollster / Client	Sample size	Margin of error	Date	Fujimori FP	Sánchez JP	Blank/None	Undecided	Lead
Ipsos Perú	4,032	1.5	6 June 2026	44.1	43.7	12.2	—	0.4
Datum Internacional	2,622	1.9	6 June 2026	44.9	43.9	11.2	—	1
Ipsos Perú	1,231	2.1	3 June 2026	43.2	43.8	13	—	0.6
Datum Internacional	1,201	2.8	3–4 June 2026	38.8	37.0	24.2	—	1.8
Ipsos Perú/Perú21	1,204	2.8	29–30 May 2026	40.4	38.3	21.3	—	2.1
Datum Internacional/El Comercio	1,501	2.5	26–30 May 2026	39.7	35.4	24.9	—	4.3
CIT	1,220	2.8	27–29 May 2026	41.1	33.4	13.2	12.3	7.7
CPI	1,200	2.8	26–28 May 2026	32.5	29.1	22.6	13.4	3.4
CB Global Data	1,595	2.5	25–30 May 2026	38.6	36.5	15.1	9.8	2.1
Imasolu	1,200	2.8	23–26 May 2026	39.58	33.08	14.25	13.08	6.5
IEP/La República	1,204	2.8	22–26 May 2026	36	30	6	26	6
Datum Internacional/América TV	1,200	2.8	17–20 May 2026	39.5	36.1	15.9	8.5	3.4
Ipsos Peru/Péru 21	1,210	2.8	16–17 May 2026	39	35	14	12	4
CIT/Expreso	1,220	2.8	14–17 May 2026	40.5	36	23.5	—	4.5
IEP/La República	1,197	2.8	21–25 April 2026	31	32	24	13	1
Ipsos Perú/Perú21	1,208	2.8	23–24 April 2026	38	38	17	7	Tie

=== First round ===
==== Voting simulations ====
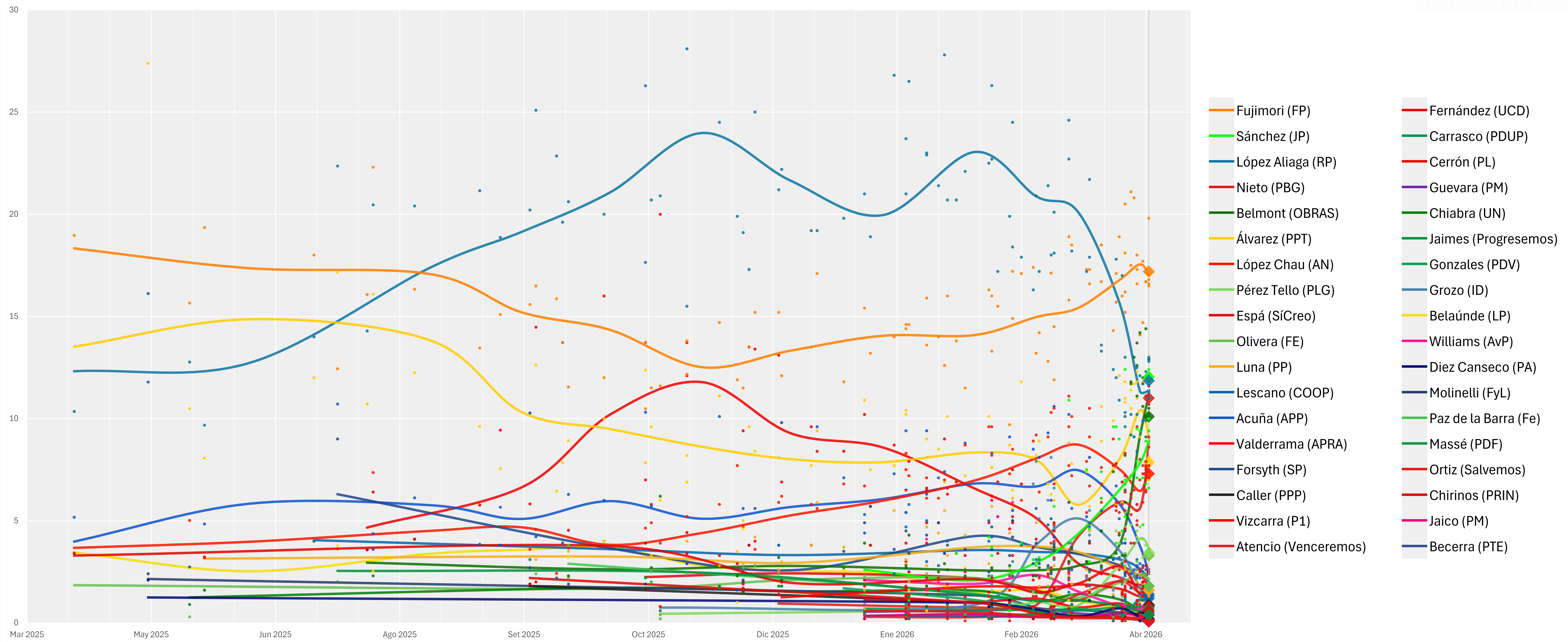
Trend lines of the voting intention polls for the first round.

Pollster/ Client	Date	Sample size															Other	Blank/ None
Pollster/ Client	Date	Sample size	Fujimori	Sánchez	López Aliaga	Nieto	Belmont	Álvarez	López-Chau	Pérez Tello	Espá	Olivera	Luna	Lescano	Acuña	Valderrama	Other	Blank/ None
Pollster/ Client	Date	Sample size	FP	JP	RP	PBG	OBRAS	PPT	AN	PLG	PSC	FE2021	PP	CooP	APP	APRA	Other	Blank/ None
1st round results	12 April 2026	N/A	17.2	12.0	11.9	11.0	10.1	7.9	7.3	3.4	3.4	1.8	1.6	1.3	1.1	1.0	9.0	N/A
CPI/RPP	3–4 Apr 2026	1,722	16.2	5.2	13.0	6.4	5.9	11.8	8.3	5.4	2.0	3.4	2.6	2.0	4.5	1.3	12.3 (Note: Including George Forsyth at 2.4%, Wolfgang Grozo at 1.3, and Mesías Guevara at 1.2%.)	N/A
CPI/RPP	3–4 Apr 2026	1,722	13.3	4.3	10.6	5.3	4.9	9.7	6.8	4.4	1.6	2.8	2.1	1.6	3.7	1.1	10.0 (Note: Including George Forsyth at 1.9%, Wolfgang Grozo at 1.0%, and Mesías Guevara at 1.0%.)	17.8
Datum Internacional/El Comercio	1–4 Apr 2026	1,422	18.1	7.2	10.3	7.2	6.5	10.8	4.6	4.7	3.0	2.8	–	2.7	3.0	–	19.3 (Note: Including George Forsyth at 2.5%.)	N/A
Datum Internacional/El Comercio	1–4 Apr 2026	1,422	13.5	5.2	7.6	5.3	4.8	8.0	3.4	3.5	2.2	2.1	2.2	1.2	2.0	1.2	11.9 (Note: Including George Forsyth at 1.9%, Ronald Atencio at 1.3%, Vladimir Cerrón at 1.2%, Alex Gonzales at 0.9%, Mario Vizcarra at 0.9%, Paul Jaimes at 0.8%, Wolfgang Grozo at 0.7%, Mesías Guevara at 0.6%, Herbert Caller at 0.5%, Rosario Fernández Bazán at 0.4%, Roberto Chiabra at 0.4%, José Williams at 0.4%, Charlie Carrasco at 0.3%, Rafael Belaúnde Llosa at 0.3%, Álvaro Paz de la Barra at 0.3%, Francisco Diez Canseco Távara at 0.2%, Armando Massé at 0.2%, Walter Chirinos at 0.2%, Fiorella Molinelli at 0.2%, Antonio Ortiz at 0.2%, and Carlos Jaico at 0.0%.)	25.7
Ipsos Perú/Perú 21	1–2 Apr 2026	1,192	18.6	9.0	10.9	5.6	4.3	12.1	4.4	3.9	2.8	–	–	3.2	5.1	–	20.1 (Note: Including Ronald Atencio at 2.6%.)	N/A
Ipsos Perú/Perú 21	1–2 Apr 2026	1,192	13.7	6.7	8.1	4.1	3.2	9.0	3.3	2.8	2.1	–	–	2.4	3.8	–	14.8 (Note: Including Ronald Atencio at 1.9%.)	26.0
Ipsos Perú/Perú 21	21–22 Mar 2026	1,189	17.3	7.5	17.2	5.4	3.0	7.4	7.9	–	–	–	2.6	2.7	5.2	–	23.8 (Note: Including George Forsyth at 3.0%, Ronald Atencio at 2.3%, Wolfgang Grozo at 2.2%, Mario Vizcarra at 1.8%.)	N/A
Ipsos Perú/Perú 21	21–22 Mar 2026	1,189	12.3	5.4	12.2	3.8	2.2	5.2	5.6	–	–	–	1.8	1.9	3.7	–	16.9 (Note: Including George Forsyth at 2.1%, Ronald Atencio at 1.6%, Wolfgang Grozo at 1.6%, and Mario Vizcarra at 1.3%.)	29.0
Ipsos Perú/Perú 21	5–6 Mar 2026	1,182	14.2	3.2	17.2	2.2	2.7	8.9	6.4	–	–	–	1.8	3.1	8.1	–	31.5 (Note: Including Wolfgang Grozo at 5.1%, George Forsyth at 2.9%, Mario Vizcarra at 2.3%, Ronald Atencio at 1.6%.)	N/A
Ipsos Perú/Perú 21	5–6 Mar 2026	1,182	9.2	2.0	11.2	1.5	1.8	5.8	4.1	–	–	–	1.2	2.0	5.3	–	20.7 (Note: Including Wolfgang Grozo at 3.3%, George Forsyth at 1.9%, Mario Vizcarra at 1.5%, Ronald Atencio at 1.1%.)	34.8

==== 2026 ====
Legend:

Poll performed during the blackout of polling information.

Pollster/ Client	Date	Sample size														Other	Blank/ None	Undecided	Lead
Pollster/ Client	Date	Sample size	Fujimori	Sánchez	López Aliaga	Nieto	Belmont	Álvarez	López-Chau	Luna	Lescano	Acuña	Forsyth	Vizcarra	Grozo	Other	Blank/ None	Undecided	Lead
Pollster/ Client	Date	Sample size	FP	JPP	RP	PBG	OBRAS	PPT	AN	PP	CooP	APP	SP	P1	ID	Other	Blank/ None	Undecided	Lead
Ipsos Perú/Perú 21	6 Apr 2026	1,205	16	7	7	–	9	8	–	–	–	–	–	–	–	29	24		7
Ipsos Perú/Perú 21	3–4 Apr 2026	1,205	15	5	7	4	6	8	5	2	–	3	–	–	–	18 (Note: Including Marisol Pérez Tello at 3% and Fernando Olivera at 3%.)	11	16	7
CPI/RPP	3–4 Apr 2026	2,000	11.8	3.8	9.2	4.8	4.3	8.5	6.0	1.7	1.4	3.2	1.6	–	0.8	14.8 (Note: Including Marisol Pérez Tello at 3.7%, Fernando Olivera at 2.4%, Carlos Espá at 1.5%, Mesías Guevara at 0.9%, and Enrique Valderrama at 0.8%.)	14.7	13.9	2.6
Datum Internacional/El Comercio	1–4 Apr 2026	3,000	14.5	4.9	9.9	6.0	5.5	10.9	4.7	0.9	2.4	3.2	1.2	1.3	1.1	16.5 (Note: Including Marisol Pérez Tello at 4.5%, Carlos Espá at 2.6%, Fernando Olivera at 1.8%, Enrique Valderrama at 1.2%, Herbert Caller at 0.9%, Mesías Guevara at 0.8%, Roberto Chiabra at 0.7%, Ronald Atencio at 0.6%, Alex Gonzales at 0.5%, Rosario Fernández Bazán at 0.4%, Rafael Belaúnde Llosa at 0.4%, Francisco Diez Canseco Távara at 0.3%, Vladimir Cerrón at 0.3%, Álvaro Paz de la Barra at 0.3%, Armando Massé at 0.3%, Paul Jaimes at 0.3%, Charlie Carrasco at 0.2%, Fiorella Molinelli at 0.2%, José Williams at 0.1%, Walter Chirinos at 0.1%, Antonio Ortiz at 0.0%, and Carlos Jaico at 0.0%.)	8.1	8.7	3.6
Ipsos Perú/Perú 21	1–2 Apr 2026	1,217	13	6	8	5	3	9	4	2	2	3	2	–	–	14 (Note: Including Marisol Pérez Tello at 2%.)	16	13	4
IEP/La República	28–31 Mar 2026	1,203	10.0	6.7	8.7	5.4	5.2	6.9	6.3	1.0	2.2	2.2	0.9	1.9	1.1	11.1 (Note: Including Marisol Pérez Tello at 2.3%, Carlos Espá at 1.6%, Fernando Olivera at 1.2%, Vladimir Cerrón at 0.6%, Ronald Atencio at 0.6%, Charlie Carrasco at 0.6%, Roberto Chiabra at 0.6%, Rosario Fernández Bazán at 0.5%, Enrique Valderrama at 0.5%, Herbert Caller at 0.4%, Carlos Jaico at 0.4%, Paul Jaimes at 0.4%, Mesías Guevara at 0.3%, Rafael Belaúnde Llosa at 0.3%, Fiorella Molinelli at 0.3%, Álvaro Paz de la Barra at 0.2%, José Williams at 0.1%, Armando Massé at 0.1%, Alex Gonzales at 0.1%, Francisco Diez Canseco Távara at 0.0%, Walter Chirinos at 0.0%, and Antonio Ortiz at 0.0%.)	22.7	21.8	1.3
Ipsos Perú/Perú 21	26–27 Mar 2026	1,212	11	4	9	5	3	7	4	–	2	3	–	–	–	18	21	13	2
Datum Internacional/El Comercio	25–27 Mar 2026	2,000	13.0	4.9	11.7	5.9	2.9	6.9	6.1	2.1	2.5	4.0	1.3	1.5	2.1	12.1 (Note: Including Fernando Olivera at 1.7%, Marisol Pérez Tello at 1.2%, Enrique Valderrama at 1.2%, Carlos Espá at 1.1%, Vladimir Cerrón at 0.7%, Ronald Atencio at 0.5%, Paul Jaimes at 0.5%, Rosario Fernández Bazán at 0.5%, Carlos Jaico at 0.4%, Alex Gonzales at 0.4%, Roberto Chiabra at 0.4%, Rafael Belaúnde Llosa at 0.3%, Francisco Diez Canseco Távara at 0.3%, Armando Massé at 0.3%, Charlie Carrasco at 0.3%, Walter Chirinos at 0.2%, Fiorella Molinelli at 0.2%, Álvaro Paz de la Barra at 0.2%, José Williams at 0.2%, Herbert Caller at 0.1%, Antonio Ortiz at 0.1%, and Mesías Guevara at 0.1%.)	12.2	11.6	1.3
CPI/RPP	21–23 Mar 2026	1,300	10.1	3.1	11.2	3.9	2.1	3.5	6.6	3.0	1.1	3.2	2.3	0.9	2.9	6.4 (Note: Including Rosario Fernández Bazán at 0.9% and Vladimir Cerrón at 0.8%.)	16.5	23.1	1.1
Ipsos Perú/Perú 21	21–22 Mar 2026	1,203	11	5	10	5	2	5	5	2	2	3	2	2	–	10	21	15	1
Death of Napoleón Becerra (15 March 2026)
Datum Internacional/El Comercio	13–17 Mar 2026	1,500	11.9	2.0	11.7	4.6	2.4	5.0	6.5	1.2	2.3	3.6	1.7	1.2	2.5	7.5 (Note: Including Fernando Olivera at 0.9%, Roberto Chiabra at 0.7%, Vladimir Cerrón at 0.6%, Carlos Espá at 0.6%, Paul Jaimes at 0.6%, Rosario Fernández Bazán at 0.5%, Marisol Pérez Tello at 0.5%, Ronald Atencio at 0.5%, Enrique Valderrama at 0.3%, Rafael Belaúnde at 0.3%, Alex Gonzales at 0.3%, Charlie Carrasco at 0.3%, Mesías Guevara at 0.3%, Fiorella Molinelli at 0.3%, José Williams at 0.1%, Carlos Jaico at 0.1%, Armando Massé at 0.1%, Álvaro Paz de la Barra at 0.1%, Walter Chirinos at 0.1%, Herbert Caller at 0.1%, Antonio Ortiz at 0.1%, and Francisco Diez Canseco Távara at 0.1%.)	17.7 (Note: Including Napoleón Becerra’s polling.)	18.1	0.2
Imasolu	13–16 Mar 2026	1,200	13.4	–	16.5	2.6	–	3.3	5.2	4.9	2.8	5.6	2.3	2.8	3.1	6.7	3.8	25.4	3.1
IEP/La República	6–11 Mar 2026	1,207	9.4	3.7	11.7	2.1	2.3	3.9	6.8	1.8	2.5	2.7	2.4	3.1	4.3	8.1	19	16.2	2.3
Datum Internacional/América TV	6–10 Mar 2026	1,502	10.9	1.4	11.4	2.5	1.6	4.0	6.5	0.8	3.2	3.8	1.5	1.7	5.1	8.9	21.5	15.2	0.5
Ipsos Perú/Perú 21	5–6 Mar 2026	1,202	10	2	11	2	2	6	4	2	2	4	3	3	4	13 (Note: Including José Williams at 2%.)	20	12	1
CPI/RPP	28 Feb – 5 Mar 2026	1,300	8.0	1.7	12.7	0.8	1.4	5.6	5.6	3.0	1.9	3.4	2.4	2.5	4.8	7.5 (Note: Including Enrique Valderrama at 1.0%.)	16.4	20.8	4.7
Datum Internacional/América TV	27 Feb – 4 Mar 2026	1,501	10.7	1.9	10.0	–	1.4	5.0	5.5	1.3	2.6	5.2	1.8	2.3	4.2	9.8 (Note: Including Jorge Nieto at 1.3%, Fernando Olivera at 0.9%, Rafael Belaúnde Llosa at 0.9%, Carlos Espá 0.8%, Marisol Pérez Tello at 0.6%, Roberto Chiabra at 0.5%, Ronald Atencio at 0.5%, Vladimir Cerrón at 0.5%, Rosario Fernández Bazán at 0.5%, Enrique Valderrama at 0.4%, Paul Jaimes at 0.4%, Alex Gonzales at 0.3%, Mesías Guevara at 0.3%, Armando Massé at 0.3%, Antonio Ortiz at 0.3%, Carlos Jaico at 0.2%, Fiorella Molinelli at 0.2%, Charlie Carrasco at 0.2%, José Williams at 0.1%, Napoleón Becerra at 0.1%, Walter Chirinos at 0.1%, José Williams at 0.1%, Álvaro Paz de la Barra at 0.1%, Herbert Caller at 0.1%, and Francisco Diez Canseco Távara at 0.1%.)	23.0	15.5	0.7
CELAG	5–25 Feb 2026	2,260	10.0	2.3	10.5	–	–	6.9	3.5	–	2.2	–	–	4.0	–	7.8	16.2	25.2	0.5
Imasolu/Exitosa	23–25 Feb 2026	1,200	9.9	–	14.1	–	1.3	3.2	4.3	3.5	2.9	4.3	2.4	2.8	1.7	7.1	5.9	36.5	4.2
CIT/Panamericana	20–24 Feb 2026	1,200	6.8	–	14.0	–	2.0	6.1	4.8	3.1	–	6.4	2.3	3.2	2.9	17.3 (Note: Including Paul Jaimes at 2.0%, Rafael Belaúnde Llosa at 1.9%, and José Williams at 1.6%.)	18.9	10.9	7.2
Ipsos Perú/Perú 21	19–20 Feb 2026	1,206	9	2	10	–	2	3	4	2	–	4	3	2	–	17 (Note: Including José Williams at 3% and Enrique Valderrama at 2%.)	28	14	1
CPI/RPP	14–18 Feb 2026	1,300	7.0	1.8	13.9	–	1.4	4.0	5.1	3.0	2.2	4.4	1.9	3.2	–	5.0	18.0	29.1	6.9
IEP/La República	13–18 Feb 2026	1,201	10.3	2.4	14.6	0.3	1.7	4.9	5.3	0.8	3.0	2.3	1.5	4.0	1.2	12.2 (Note: Including Fernando Olivera at 1.5%, Vladimir Cerrón at 1.4%, Rosario Fernández Bazán at 1.3%, Marisol Pérez Tello at 1.0%, Rafael Belaúnde Llosa at 0.8%, Charlie Carrasco at 0.8%, Enrique Valderrama at 0.7%, Carlos Espá at 0.7%, Herbert Caller at 0.6%, Roberto Chiabra at 0.6%, Fiorella Molinelli at 0.5%, José Williams at 0.4%, Armando Massé at 0.3%, Mesías Guevara at 0.3%, Jorge Nieto at 0.3%, Ronald Atencio at 0.3%, Walter Chirinos at 0.3%, Paul Jaimes at 0.2%, Álvaro Paz de la Barra at 0.1%, Francisco Diez Canseco Távara at 0.1%, Antonio Ortiz at 0.1%, Carlos Jaico at 0.1%, Alex Gonzales at 0.1%, and Napoleón Becerra at 0.0%.)	17.1	18.6	4.3
Datum Internacional/América TV	13–17 Feb 2026	1,500	9.7	2.5	13.4	0.1	1.4	6.0	5.7	1.7	2.4	3.0	1.5	2.6	–	9.6 (Note: Including Carlos Espá at 0.9%, Rafael Belaúnde Llosa at 0.8%, Vladimir Cerrón at 0.8%, Enrique Valderrama at 0.6%, Roberto Chiabra at 0.6%, Rosario Fernández Bazán at 0.6%, Fernando Olivera at 0.5%, Mesías Guevara at 0.5%, Francisco Diez Canseco Távara at 0.5%, Marisol Pérez Tello at 0.5%, Ronald Atencio at 0.3%, José Williams at 0.2%, Alex Gonzales at 0.2%, Herbert Caller at 0.2%, Álvaro Paz de la Barra at 0.2%, Walter Chirinos at 0.1%, Jorge Nieto at 0.1%, Charlie Carrasco at 0.1%, Carlos Jaico at 0.1%, Paul Jaimes at 0.1%, Armando Massé at 0.1%, Antonio Ortiz at 0.4%, Fiorella Molinelli at 0.1%, and Napoleón Becerra at 0.0%.)	24.1	16.3	3.7
Deadline to voluntarily withdraw from the general election (11 February 2026)
CIT/Panamericana	5–9 Feb 2026	1,200	8.0	–	15.3	–	1.6	5.0	6.0	3.0	–	6.1	2.5	2.3	–	14.7 (Note: Including Rafael Belaúnde Llosa at 1.9%, Paul Jaimes at 1.8%, and José Williams at 1.7%.)	17.7	13.0	7.3
Ipsos Perú/Perú 21	5–6 Feb 2026	1,211	8	2	12	–	–	4	4	2	–	4	2	4	–	16 (Note: Including José Williams at 2%.)	27	15	4
Datum Internacional/El Comercio	30 Jan – 3 Feb 2026	1,200	9.2	1.1	11.9	0.3	1.5	5.8	3.8	1.9	2.3	3.8	2.2	3.6	0.8	9.7 (Note: Including Enrique Valderrama at 1.1%, Vladimir Cerrón at 0.8%, Rosario Fernández Bazán at 0.8%, Paul Jaimes at 0.8%, Carlos Espá at 0.7, Rafael Belaúnde Llosa at 0.7%, Francisco Diez Canseco Távara at 0.6%, Roberto Chiabra at 0.5%, José Williams at 0.4%, Fernando Olivera at 0.4%, Armando Massé at 0.4%, Ronald Atencio at 0.3%, Mesías Guevara at 0.3%, Fiorella Molinelli at 0.3%, Carlos Jaico at 0.3%, Alex Gonzales at 0.3%, Jorge Nieto at 0.3%, Walter Chirinos at 0.2%, Napoleón Becerra at 0.2%, Herbert Caller at 0.2%, Charlie Carrasco at 0.2%, Álvaro Paz de la Barra at 0.2%, Marisol Pérez Tello at 0.1%, and Antonio Ortiz at 0.1%)	27.6	14.9	2.7
CPI/RPP	29 Jan – 2 Feb 2026	1,200	6.6	–	14.6	–	1.5	3.6	3.7	2.9	1.8	3.9	1.8	4.7	–	7.2	15.8	29.0	8.0
Imasolu/Exitosa	28–31 Jan 2026	1,200	8.9	–	13.6	–	1.6	5.4	3.9	2.8	1.8	4.5	3.1	3.1	–	15.9 (Note: Including Enrique Valderrama at 1.4%, José Williams at 1.3%, Rafael Belaúnde Llosa at 1.3%, Carlos Espa at 1.0%, Vladimir Cerrón at 1.0%, Fernando Olivera at 0.9%, and Fernando Olivera at 0.9%.)	6.3	30.2	4.7
IDICE/La Razón	24–27 Jan 2026	1,200	7.8	–	11.2	–	0.4	4.4	3.0	2.3	0.4	4.6	3.1	3.2	–	8.5 (Note: Including Vladimir Cerrón at 2.4%, Enrique Valderrama at 1.9%, Fernando Olivera at 1.2%, José Williams at 0.8%, Carlos Espá at 0.8%, Roberto Chiabra at 0.7%, Ricardo Belmont at 0.4%, and Rafael Belaúnde Llosa at 0.3%.)	10.9	40.1	3.4
IEP/La República	16–21 Jan 2026	1,211	8.1	0.6	14.7	0.5	2.4	4.0	4.0	0.8	3.2	1.4	1.9	4.4	0.4	9.1 (Note: Including Carlos Espa at 1.4%, Marisol Pérez Tello at 1.1%, Rafael Belaúnde Llosa at 0.9%, Rosario Fernández Bazán at 0.8%, Roberto Chiabra at 0.7%, Fernando Olivera at 0.7%, Vladimir Cerrón at 0.5%, Jorge Nieto at 0.5%, Fiorella Molinelli at 0.4%, Charlie Carrasco at 0.4%, José Williams at 0.3%, Enrique Valderrama at 0.2%, Carlos Jaico at 0.2%, Alex Gonzales at 0.2%, Herbert Caller at 0.2%, Walter Chirinos at 0.2%, Paul Jaimes at 0.2%, Napoleón Becerra at 0.2%, Armando Massé at 0.1%, Álvaro Paz de la Barra at 0.1%, Francisco Diez Canseco Távara at 0.1%, Antonio Ortiz at 0.1%, and Ronald Atencio at 0.1%.)	22.7	21.8	6.6
Datum Internacional/América TV	16–20 Jan 2026	1,202	8.0	0.8	11.7	0.3	1.5	5.7	4.6	1.6	2.5	3.0	3.0	3.6	0.3	9.1 (Note: Including Carlos Espá at 1.0%, Roberto Chiabra at 0.9%, Enrique Valderrama at 0.8%, Fiorella Molinelli at 0.7%, Fernando Olivera at 0.7%, Vladimir Cerrón at 0.7%, Charlie Carrasco at 0.5%, Rosario Fernández Bazán at 0.4%, Mesías Guevara at 0.4%, Marisol Pérez Tello at 0.4%, Antonio Ortiz at 0.4%, Álvaro Paz de la Barra at 0.4%, Alex Gonzales at 0.4%, Jorge Nieto at 0.3%, Carlos Jaico at 0.3%, Ronald Atencio at 0.2%, Rafael Belaúnde Llosa at 0.2%, Francisco Diez Canseco Távara at 0.2%, José Williams at 0.1%, Walter Chirinos at 0.1%, Paul Jaimes at 0.1%, Herbert Caller at 0.1%, Armando Massé at 0.1%, and Napoleón Becerra at 0.0%.)	25.9	18.4	3.7
CIT/Panamericana	16–20 Jan 2026	1,220	9.3	–	15.1	–	1.1	6.6	4.8	2.0	3.0	6.0	1.0	2.5	–	12.2 (Note: Including Carlos Espá at 1.9%, Roberto Chiabra at 1.8%, Enrique Valderrama at 1.1%, Rafael Belaúnde Llosa at 1.0%, and Rosario Fernández Bazán at 1.0%.)	21.6	14.8	5.8
CPI/RPP	11–16 Jan 2026	1,200	7.1	–	13.6	–		3.9	3.1	2.8	1.2	3.7	1.8	4.4	–	9.2	18.8	30.5	6.5
Ipsos Perú/Perú 21	7–8 Jan 2026	1,207	7	2	10	–	–	4	3	2	–	2	3	3	–	17 (Note: Including José Williams at 2%, Vladimir Cerrón at 2% and Fernando Olivera at 2%.)	29	18	3
Datum Internacional/El Comercio	2–6 Jan 2026	1,200	8.8	0.8	12.0	0.0	2.2	6.2	3.8	0.9	3.0	2.5	2.8	5.8	0.5	7.8 (Note: Including Fernando Olivera at 1.3%, Vladimir Cerrón at 1.2%, Carlos Espá at 1.0%, Rosario Fernández Bazán at 0.4%, Rafael Belaúnde Llosa at 0.4%, Marisol Pérez Tello at 0.4%, Álvaro Paz de la Barra at 0.4%, Enrique Valderrama at 0.3%, Paul Jaimes at 0.3%, Charlie Carrasco at 0.3%, Armando Massé at 0.3%, Antonio Ortiz at 0.3%, Alex Gonzales at 0.3%, José Williams at 0.2%, Roberto Chiabra at 0.2%, Mesías Guevara at 0.2%, Herbert Caller a 0.2%, Fiorella Molinelli at 0.2%, Walter Chirinos at 0.1%, Ronald Atencio at 0.1%, Carlos Jaico at 0.1%, Francisco Diez Canseco Távara at 0.0%, Jorge Nieto at 0.0%, and Napoleón Becerra at 0.0%.)	35.8	14.7	3.2

==== 2025 ====
Pollster / Client	Date	Sample size												Other	Blank / None	Undecided	Lead
Pollster / Client	Date	Sample size	López Aliaga	Fujimori	Vizcarra	Álvarez	Acuña	López-Chau	Lescano	Espá	Forsyth	Belaúnde	Butters	Other	Blank / None	Undecided	Lead
Pollster / Client	Date	Sample size	RP	FP	P1	PPT	APP	AN	CooP	PSC	SP	LP	AvP	Other	Blank / None	Undecided	Lead
Deadline to register tickets and parliamentary lists for the general election (23 December 2025)
Ipsos Perú/América TV	18–19 Dec 2025	1,211	10	7	5	4	3	3	2	2	–	2	–	14 (Note: Including José Luna at 2%)	28	20	3
National Jury of Elections annuls Popular Action's primary election (13 December 2025)
CIT/Panamericana	5–9 Dec 2025	1,220	13.5	7.4	4.2	6.0	6.0	3.8	–	1.3	1.1	–	–	17.8 (Note: Including José Luna at 1.8%, Ricardo Belmont at 1.3% Roberto Chiabra at 1.3%, Fernando Olivera at 1.2%, and Enrique Valderrama at 1.2%.)	21.7	17.3	6.1
Datum Internacional/El Comercio	4–8 Dec 2025	1,201	10.5	7.5	6.5	4.0	1.9	2.9	1.9	0.7	1.2	0.7	–	11.7 (Note: Including Ricardo Belmont at 1.6%, José Luna at 1.3%, Fernando Olivera at 1.2%, Roberto Chiabra at 0.9%, Jorge Nieto at 0.7%, Popular Action candidate at 0.7%, and Vladimir Cerrón at 0.7%)	35.8	14.7	3
Second primary elections and confirmation of José Williams as Go on Country – Social Integration Party’s presidential nominee (7 December 2025)
Phillip Butters drops out of the presidential election and leaves Go on Country – Social Integration Party (5 December 2025)
First primary elections (30 November 2025)
Ipsos Perú/América TV	27–28 Nov 2025	1,210	9	7	7	5	2	2	2	2	2	2	2	10	33	15	2
CPI/RPP	26–30 Nov 2025	1,200	12.5	7.6	6.7	4.2	2.8	1.8	–	2.0	1.4	–	1.1	9.9 (Note: Including José Luna at 2.1% and Fernando Olivera at 1.4%)	19.2	30.7	4.9
CIT/Expreso	14–18 Nov 2025	1,220	14.8	8.9	2.0	6.7	6.1	3.5	–	–	1.1	1.0	1.6	14.6 (Note: Including Alfredo Barnechea at 3.7%, José Luna at 1.7% Paul Jaimes at 1.1%, and Ricardo Belmont at 1.0%.)	20.6	18.9	5.9
Ipsos Perú/Perú21	6–7 Nov 2025	1,210	9	8	7	4	3	3	–	2	2	2	2	16 (Note: Including Alfredo Barnechea at 2% and Javier Velásquez at 2%)	30	12	1
CPI/RPP	3–7 Nov 2025	1,200	12.7	5.5	6.2	3.7	2.0	2.0	–	–	1.3	–	1.4	10.4 (Note: Including José Luna at 1.8%, Susel Paredes at 1.6%, and Fernando Olivera at 1.1%)	21.7	33.1	7.2
Ipsos Perú/América TV	23–24 Oct 2025	1,208	9	7	7	4	2	2	2	2	–	2	2	12 (Note: Including Víctor Andrés García Belaúnde at 2%)	37	12	2
Ipsos Perú/Perú21	9–10 Oct 2025	1,210	10	6	8	5	3	2	–	–	–	2	2	12	39	11	4
CIT/Expreso	21–24 Oct 2025	1,220	15.3	6.1	4.1	7.2	6.0	2.1	–	–	–	1.0	3.1	12.7	19.6	22.2	9.2
Ipsos Perú/América TV	25–26 Sep 2025	1,220	10	7	7	4	2	–	2	–	–	2	3	14 (Note: Including Guillermo Bermejo at 2%)	37	12	3
IEP/La República	19–24 Sep 2025	1,202	8.5	5.9	–	2.4	–	0.9	0.8	–	–	–	0.5	15.1 (Note: Including Martín Vizcarra at 9.2%, Pedro Castillo at 3.3%, Antauro Humala at 1.1%, Arturo Fernández Bazán at 0.6%, Verónika Mendoza at 0.6%, Hernando de Soto at 0.6%, and Franco Vidal at 0.5%)	5.5	57.3	2.6
CPI/RPP	11–17 Sep 2025	1,200	13.7	9.0	7.9	6.9	2.3	2.5	–	–	–	–	1.2	11.2 (Note: Including José Luna at 1.7%, Fernando Olivera at 1.3%, Vladimir Cerrón at 1.1%, and Jorge del Castillo at 1.0%)	17.6	27.8	4.7
CIT/Expreso	12–15 Sep 2025	1,220	11.8	9.1	3.4	6.0	6.0	2.1	–	–	–	–	2.7	17.2	28.2	13.4	2.7
Ipsos Perú/Perú21	4–5 Sep 2025	1,204	10	8	5	4	3	2	2	–	2	2	2	13 (Note: Including Víctor Andrés García Belaúnde at 2%)	37	10	2
Ipsos Perú/América TV	28–29 Aug 2025	1,208	11	7	3	5	2	3	–	–	–	–	2	19 (Note: Including Arturo Fernández Bazán at 2%)	38	10	4
Ipsos Perú/Perú21	6–7 Aug 2025	1,207	10	8	–	6	3	2	2	–	–	2	–	16 (Note: Including Vladimir Cerrón at 2% and Arturo Fernández Bazán at 2%)	38	13	2
Ipsos Perú/América TV	21–22 Jul 2025	1,205	8	9	2	6	2	2	–	–	2	–	2	23 (Note: Including Vladimir Cerrón at 2%, Ricardo Belmont at 2%, Víctor Andrés García Belaúnde at 2%, and Jorge del Castillo at 2%)	32	12	1
CPI/RPP	18–24 Jul 2025	1,200	8.9	9.7	–	7.0	1.9	3.2	–	–	–	1.1	1.8	10.0 (Note: Including Vladimir Cerrón at 2.8%, Jorge del Castillo at 1.0%, and Roberto Chiabra at 1.0%)	17.2	39.3	0.8
CIT/Expreso	10–12 Jul 2025	1,200	14.2	7.9	–	10.9	6.8	2.3	–	–	–	2.4	4.2	14.8	11.9	24.6	6.3
Ipsos Perú/Perú21	3–4 Jul 2025	1,204	7	9	–	6	2	2	2	–	–	2	2	18 (Note: Including Arturo Fernández Bazán at 2% and Alfredo Barnechea at 2%)	37	13	2
CPI/RPP	15–23 May 2025	1,200	8.4	10.3	–	6.9	1.8	3.3	–	–	–	–	1.6	33.7 (Note: Including Martín Vizcarra at 15.1%, Hernando de Soto at 5.2%, Verónika Mendoza at 3.0%, Antauro Humala at 2.3%, Fernando Olivera at 0.8%, Jorge del Castillo at 0.8%, Roberto Chiabra at 0.6%, Julio Chávez Chiong at 0.6%, Susel Paredes at 0.5%, and Jonás Ataucusi at 0.5%)	20.0	14.2	1.9
CIT/Expreso	6–9 May 2025	1,220	9.3	9.3	–	15.8	6.8	–	–	–	–	–	1.6	14.8	28.3	14.0	6.5
Ipsos Perú/Perú21	13–14 Apr 2025	1,206	6	11	–	6	3	2	–	–	–	2	2	26 (Note: Including Hernando de Soto at 3%, Verónika Mendoza at 3%, Susel Paredes at 2%, Vladimir Cerrón at 2%, Alfredo Barnechea at 2%, Fernando Olivera at 2%, and Guillermo Bermejo at 2%)	32	10	5
CIT/Expreso	27–31 Mar 2025	1,200	8.3	13	–	6	2	1	–	–	–	1	–	23	30	14	4.7
Ipsos Perú/Perú21	9–10 Jan 2025	1,214	4	12	–	4	2	2	–	–	2	2	2	26 (Note: Including Hernando de Soto at 3%, Francisco Sagasti at 3%, Aníbal Torres at 3%, Verónika Mendoza at 3%, Carla García at 2%, Alfredo Barnechea at 2%, and Fernando Olivera at 2%)	30	14	8

==== 2024 ====
Pollster / Client	Date	Sample size												Other	Blank / None	Undecided
Pollster / Client	Date	Sample size	Fujimori	Humala	Álvarez	Sagasti	de Soto	López Aliaga	Mendoza	López-Chau	Butters	Torres	Acuña	Other	Blank / None	Undecided
Pollster / Client	Date	Sample size	FP	ANTAURO (Note: Party disqualified on 31 October 2024)	PPT	PM	Prog.	RP	NP	AN	AvP	APU	APP	Other	Blank / None	Undecided
Ipsos Perú/Perú21	10–11 Oct 2024	1,218	12	8	4	4	3	3	2	2	2	1	–	12 (Note: Including Rafael Belaúnde at 2%)	30	17
CPI/RPP	15–19 Jul 2024	1,370	2.2	1.0	1.3	–	2.5	1.8	–	1.6	–	–	–	23.6 (Note: Including Martín Vizcarra at 4.1%, Alberto Fujimori at 2.5%, Pedro Castillo at 1.9%, Carlos Bruce at 1.7%, Álvaro Paz de la Barra at 1.6%, Carlos Añaños at 1.5%, Salvador del Solar at 1.3%, Yonhy Lescano at 1.1%, and Arturo Fernández Bazán at 1.0%)	11.9	53.9
Ipsos Perú/Perú21	17–18 Jul 2024	1,218	10	6	2	3	4	2	3	2	2	2	2	17 (Note: Including José Luna at 2%, Rafael Belaúnde at 2%, Guido Bellido at 2%, and Yonhy Lescano at 2%)	21	24
Ipsos Perú/50+Uno	25 May–2 Jun 2024	1,200	17.5	4.0	2.9	–	–	8.1	4.0	0.5	–	2.9	3.7	21.6 (Note: Including Martín Vizcarra at 12.3%, Yonhy Lescano at 5.9%, Carlos Añaños at 1.3%, Alberto Otárola at 1.0%, Carlos Neuhaus at 0.8%, and Vladimir Cerrón at 0.3)	13.3	21.5
IEP/La República	16–21 Mar 2024	1,207	4.4	2.1	–	–	2.3	1.0	–	1.7	–	–	0.7	17.0 (Note: Including Martín Vizcarra at 3.3%, Pedro Castillo at 3.3%, Arturo Fernández at 0.8%, Salvador del Solar at 0.7%, Alberto Fujimori at 0.7%, Ulises Villegas at 0.7%, Yonhy Lescano at 0.6%, Ulises Villegas at 0.4% and Fiorella Molinelli at 0.2%)	26.8	44.0
Sensor	19–23 Feb 2024	1,200	6.3	3.7	–	–	1.3	2.9	2.5	–	–	–	1.7	20.2 (Note: Including Yonhy Lescano at 3.2%, Daniel Urresti at 1.3%, Fernando Cillóniz at 1.2%, Julio Guzmán at 0.8%, Susel Paredes at 0.6%, Ulises Villegas at 0.4% and Fiorella Molinelli at 0.2%)	–	61.5

==== 2023 ====
Pollster / Client	Date	Sample size											Other	Blank / None	Undecided
Pollster / Client	Date	Sample size	Fujimori	Vizcarra	Humala	de Soto	López Aliaga	Mendoza	López-Chau	Acuña	Sagasti	Torres	Other	Blank / None	Undecided
Pollster / Client	Date	Sample size	FP	P1	ANTAURO	Prog.	RP	NP	AN	APP	PM	APU	Other	Blank / None	Undecided
IEP/La República	8–13 Dec 2023	1,210	4.1	3.0	1.0	1.8	1.2	0.6	–	–	–	–	13.4 (Note: Including Pedro Castillo at 4.3%, Yonhy Lescano at 1.1%, Salvador del Solar at 0.7%, Alberto Fujimori at 0.4% and Roberto Chiabra at 0.4%)	27.6	47.5
CPI	13–18 Nov 2023	1,200	2.7	2.4	1.4	2.6	3.2	0.8	0.2	0.4	0.9	–	10.8 (Note: Including Pedro Castillo at 1.9%, Yonhy Lescano at 0.8%, Carlos Añaños at 0.3% and Carlos Álvarez at 0.1%)	15.5	59.1
CPI/RPP	11–15 Jul 2023	1,200	4.8	–	5.6	4.6	9.8	2.4	–	–	2.7	–	8.5	20.6	41.0
CIT/Expreso	29–31 May 2023	1,200	9.6	–	7.3	8.2	12.8	3.2	–	–	4.3	–	9.9	–	45.0
CPI/RPP	23–28 Apr 2023	1,200	6.3	–	5.8	5.6	9.1	2.6	–	–	2.2	2.7	11.7	18.3	35.7
CIT/Expreso	20–22 Apr 2023	1,200	9.6	–	7.5	8.6	13.5	1.4	–	–	–	–	22.2	19.2	18.0
CPI/RPP	7–10 Mar 2023	1,200	3.1	2.3	3.7	5.1	8.2	2.0	–	–	2.1	1.0	10.1 (Note: Including Pedro Castillo at 2.2% and Álvaro Paz de la Barra at 1.6%)	16.9	46.5
IEP/La República	18–22 Feb 2023	1,201	2.4	2.0	1.3	4.2	2.8	1.1	4.5	–	0.2	2.1	9.3 (Note: Including Pedro Castillo at 2.1%, Yonhy Lescano at 1.2%, Daniel Urresti at 0.8%, Salvador del Solar at 0.5%, Cecilia García at 0.4%, Ricardo Belmont at 0.4%, César Acuña at 0.3%, George Forsyth at 0.1% and Ollanta Humala at 0.1%)	21.7	49.4
CIT/Expreso	16–18 Feb 2023	1,200	–	–	9.3	9.4	11.8	2.0	–	–	–	–	22.2	24.0	21.2
CPI/RPP	24–27 Jan 2023	1,200	3.2	2.4	1.6	5.2	8.6	1.1	–	–	0.7	1.4	11.2	13.8	50.9
IEP/La República	21–25 Jan 2023	1,214	2.1	1.5	1.1	3.6	3.3	1.7	0.8	–	0.8	0.9	8.3	17.3	58.8
CIT/Expreso	18–20 Jan 2023	1,200	–	–	9.8	9.3	12.2	2.0	–	–	–	–	21.0	22.0	23.8

==== 2022 ====
Pollster / Client	Date	Sample size											Other	Blank / None	Undecided
Pollster / Client	Date	Sample size	López Aliaga	Humala	de Soto	Fujimori	Vizcarra	Mendoza	Sagasti	Lescano	Chiabra	Acuña	Other	Blank / None	Undecided
Pollster / Client	Date	Sample size	RP	ANTAURO	Prog.	FP	P1	NP	PM	AP	UyP	APP	Other	Blank / None	Undecided
CPI	16–20 Nov 2022	1,200	9.7	9.0	7.2	7.0	3.6	1.9	1.1	1.1	0.7	0.5	9.1	28.6	20.8
CPI	6–9 Sep 2022	1,200	5.9	5.3	6.2	3.9	3.4	1.6	3.3	2.3	2.4	–	11.9	14.9	43.2
CPI	3–10 Aug 2022	1,200	4.2	1.5	4.8	3.6	2.2	1.9	1.6	1.8	1.3	–	12.4	8.5	58.7
CPI	28 Jun–2 Jul 2022	1,128	7.2	1.0	5.0	4.8	2.0	2.3	1.1	1.8	1.0	–	9.5	13.0	54.1

== Parliamentary election ==
=== Senate (at national level) ===
==== Voting simulations ====
Pollster / Client	Date	Sample size	Popular Force	Popular Renewal	Together for Peru	Alliance for Progress (Peru)	Party of Good Government	Now Nation	Podemos Perú	Country for All	We Are Peru	Venceremos Electoral Alliance	Democratic Integrity	Popular Cooperation	Free Peru	OBRAS Civic Party	American Popular Revolutionary Alliance	AvP	Peru First	Other	Blank / None	Lead
Ipsos Perú/Perú21 (Valid votes)	1–2 Apr 2026	1,192	17.1	10.5	9.7	5.9	5.0	4.4	–	9.3	–	–	–	3.0	–	4.3	–	–	–	30.8 (Note: Including First the People at 3.3% and IBelieve Party at 3.0%.)	N/A	6.6
Ipsos Perú/Perú21 (Cast votes)	1–2 Apr 2026	1,192	11.0	6.8	6.2	3.8	3.2	2.9	–	6.0	–	–	–	1.9	–	2.8	–	–	–	19.9 (Note: Including First the People at 2.2% and IBelieve Party at 1.9%.)	35.5	0.8
Datum Internacional/América TV (Valid votes)	25–27 Mar 2026	1,102	16.9	12.3	7.9	6.7	6.5	6.7	3.3	6.8	4.2	–	–	–	3.5	2.0	2.5	–	–	20.7 (Note: Including FREPAP at 0.9%.)	N/A	4.6
Datum Internacional/América TV (Cast votes)	25–27 Mar 2026	2,000	9.3	6.8	4.3	3.7	3.6	3.7	1.8	3.8	2.3	–	–	–	1.9	1.1	1.4	–	–	11.3 (Note: Including FREPAP at 0.5%.)	45.0	2.5
Ipsos Perú/Perú21 (Valid votes)	21–22 Mar 2026	1,189	14.6	13.2	9.6	7.2	5.8	5.5	4.3	3.9	3.8	3.2	2.7	2.5	2.4	2.4	–	–	–	18.9	N/A	1.4
Ipsos Perú/Perú21 (Cast votes)	21–22 Mar 2026	1,189	8.8	8.0	5.8	4.4	3.5	3.3	2.6	2.4	2.3	2.0	1.6	1.5	1.5	1.4	–	–	–	11.5	39.4	0.8
Ipsos Perú/Perú21 (Valid votes)	5–6 Mar 2026	1,182	13.6	12.1	2.7	9.1	3.6	6.2	3.1	7.0	3.1	–	4.3	–	2.8	–	2.7	3.1	2.9	23.7	N/A	1.5
Ipsos Perú/Perú21 (Cast votes)	5–6 Mar 2026	1,182	7.9	7.0	1.5	5.3	2.1	3.6	1.8	4.1	1.8	–	2.5	–	1.6	–	1.6	1.8	1.7	13.7	42.0	0.9

==== 2026 ====
Pollster / Client	Date	Sample size	Popular Force	Popular Renewal	We Are Peru	Alliance for Progress (Peru)	AvP	Free Peru	Party of Good Government	Together for Peru	Now Nation	Podemos Perú	American Popular Revolutionary Alliance	Country for All		Democratic Integrity	Peru First	Other	Blank / None	Undecided	Lead
Ipsos Perú/Perú 21	3–4 Apr 2026	1,205	9	5	2	5	2	–	3	5	4	3	2	5	–	–	–	21 (Note: Including OBRAS Civic Party at 5% and First the People at 2%.)	15	19	4
Datum Internacional/América TV	25–27 Mar 2026	2,000	9.4	8.0	2.6	5.8	1.3	2.3	4.6	6.1	4.6	3.1	2.7	4.0	2.0	1.4	1.1	11.7 (Note: Including Progresemos at 1.1%, Popular Cooperation at 1.0%, First the People at 1.0%, Venceremos Electoral Alliance at 1.0%, Democratic Green Party at 0.9%, Front of Hope 2021 at 0.9%, IBelieve Party at 0.7%, United Peru Democratic Party at 0.6%, National Unity at 0.5%, People's Liberty at 0.5%, Faith in Peru at 0.2%, Purple Party at 0.5%, A Different Path at 0.5%, Purple Party at 0.4%, Modern Peru at 0.4%, Peru Action at 0.4%, Patriotic Party of Peru a 0.3%, Force and Liberty at 0.3%, Federal Democratic Party at 0.3%, Let's Save Peru at 0.2%, Workers and Entrepreneurs Party at 0.1%, and Regionalist Party of National Integration at 0.1%.)	12.8	14.9	0.9
Ipsos Perú/Perú21	21–22 Mar 2026	1,203	8	6	3	5	–	2	3	4	4	2	2	3	2	–	–	15	21	20	2
Datum Internacional/El Comercio	13–17 Mar 2026	1,500	8.2	7.3	3.2	4.7	1.4	2.0	3.5	3.5	4.8	2.7	1.9	1.5	1.5	1.0	0.8	8.2 (Note: Including Venceremos Electoral Alliance at 0.9%, OBRAS Civic Party at 0.9%, People's Liberty at 0.7%, National Unity at 0.7%, First the People at 0.7%, Force and Liberty at 0.7%, United Peru Democratic Party at 0.5%, Front of Hope 2021 at 0.5%, Purple Party at 0.5%, A Different Path at 0.4%, Popular Cooperation at 0.4%, Let's Save Peru at 0.2%, Faith in Peru at 0.2%, Democratic Green Party at 0.2%, Modern Peru at 0.2%, Regionalist Party of National Integration at 0.1%, Federal Democratic Party at 0.1%, Patriotic Party of Peru a 0.1%, Workers and Entrepreneurs Party at 0.1%, Peru Action at 0.1%, and IBelieve Party at 0.0%.)	16.8	25.7	0.9
Datum Internacional/América TV	6–10 Mar 2026	1,502	7.7	6.7	3.0	4.8	1.8	1.8	2.2	3.1	3.2	3.2	2.0	1.5	1.8	1.9	0.8	9.7 (Note: Including First the People at 1.1%, Progresemos at 0.8%, Venceremos Electoral Alliance at 0.8%, Front of Hope 2021 at 0.6%, People's Liberty at 0.6%, Democratic Green Party at 0.5%, OBRAS Civic Party at 0.5%, IBelieve Party at 0.5%, Popular Cooperation at 0.5%, Purple Party at 0.5%, A Different Path at 0.4%, Patriotic Party of Peru a 0.3%, Peru Action at 0.3%, Regionalist Party of National Integration at 0.3%, National Unity at 0.3%, Federal Democratic Party at 0.2%, Force and Liberty at 0.2%, United Peru Democratic Party at 0.1%, Faith in Peru at 0.1%, and Workers and Entrepreneurs Party at 0.1%.)	21.4	24.4	1.0
Ipsos Perú/Perú21	5–6 Mar 2026	1,202	8	7	4	6	2	2	–	3	2	2	2	3	–	2	2	17 (Note: Including OBRAS Civic Party at 2%.)	18	20	1
Datum Internacional/América TV	27 Feb – 4 Mar 2026	1,501	8.1	6.3	4.1	5.8	1.4	1.5	0.9	3.9	2.5	2.8	2.3	1.6	1.7	2.2	1.2	10.3 (Note: Including People's Liberty at 0.9%, Progresemos at 0.9%, Popular Cooperation at 0.8%, Venceremos Electoral Alliance at 0.7%, First the People at 0.7%, OBRAS Civic Party at 0.6%, Let’s Save Peru at 0.6%, IBelieve Party at 0.5%, Front of Hope 2021 at 0.5%, A Different Path at 0.5%, Purple Party at 0.5%, United Peru Democratic Party at 0.4%, Regionalist Party of National Integration at 0.4%, Patriotic Party of Peru a 0.4%, Force and Liberty at 0.4%, Peru Action at 0.3%, Faith in Peru at 0.3%, Modern Peru at 0.3%, National Unity at 0.2%, Democratic Green Party at 0.2%, Federal Democratic Party at 0.1%, and Workers and Entrepreneurs Party at 0.1%.)	19.8	23.4	1.8
Ipsos Perú/Perú21	19–20 Feb 2026	1,206	7	6	4	5	3	2	–	2	2	2	3	2	2	–	–	17 (Note: Including OBRAS Civic Party at 2% and Democratic Green Party at 2%.)	25	18	1
Datum Internacional/América TV	13–16 Feb 2026	1,500	7.0	7.7	3.8	4.0	1.8	3.1	0.2	3.1	3.8	2.5	2.2	2.3	0.8	0.9	1.8	9.7 (Note: Including Popular Cooperation at 1.1%, Purple Party at 1.0%, OBRAS Civic Party at 0.9%, People's Liberty at 0.7%, Front of Hope 2021 at 0.7%, First the People at 0.6%, National Unity at 0.5%, A Different Path at 0.4%, IBelieve Party at 0.4%, Progresemos at 0.4%, Patriotic Party of Peru a 0.3%, Peru Action at 0.3%, Faith in Peru at 0.3%, Democratic Green Party at 0.3%, Venceremos Electoral Alliance at 0.3%, United Peru Democratic Party at 0.3%, Modern Peru at 0.3%, Force and Liberty at 0.3%, Let’s Save Peru at 0.2%, Federal Democratic Party at 0.1%, Workers and Entrepreneurs Party at 0.1%, Regionalist Party of National Integration at 0.1%, and Citizens for Peru at 0.1%.)	19.1	26	0.7
CIT/Panamericana	5–9 Feb 2026	1,200	6.3	9.4	1.7	4.0	3.2	2.0	–	1.6	4.6	1.7	2.0	2.9	–	–	–	12.6 (Note: Including OBRAS at 1.1%.)	22.3	24.4	3.1
Ipsos Perú/Perú21	5–6 Feb 2026	1,211	8	7	4	4	4	2	–	2	3	2	3	–	–	–	3	14 (Note: Including Venceremos Electoral Alliance at 2%.)	29	15	1
Datum Internacional/El Comercio	30 Jan – 3 Feb 2026	1,200	6.6	6.5	5.3	4.0	3.8	2.9	0.4	2.9	2.7	2.6	2.5	2.8	0.2	0.7	1.9	8.2 (Note: Including People's Liberty at 0.8%, Popular Cooperation at 0.7%, First the People at 0.7%, Peru Action at 0.7%, Front of Hope 2021 at 0.7%, Venceremos Electoral Alliance at 0.5%, A Different Path at 0.5%, United Peru Democratic Party at 0.5%, Purple Party at 0.5%, IBelieve Party at 0.4%, Modern Peru at 0.4%, National Unity at 0.3%, Let’s Save Peru at 0.3%, Workers and Entrepreneurs Party at 0.3%, Faith in Peru at 0.3%, Force and Liberty at 0.3%, Regionalist Party of National Integration at 0.2%, Federal Democratic Party at 0.2%, Democratic Green Party at 0.2%, Venceremos Electoral Alliance at 0.3%, IBelieve Party at 0.3%, First the People at 0.3%, Citizens for Peru at 0.0%, and Patriotic Party of Peru.)	21.2	22.8	0.1
Datum Internacional/América TV	16–20 Jan 2026	1,202	6.7	6.8	4.0	3.2	3.0	2.7	0.1	3.0	2.5	2.0	2.1	2.0	1.2	0.3	1.2	10.5 (Note: Including Force and Liberty at 1.1%, United Peru Democratic Party at 0.9%, Let’s Save Peru at 0.7%, Purple Party at 0.7%, Popular Cooperation at 0.6%, Workers and Entrepreneurs Party at 0.3%, National Unity at 0.5%, Peru Action at 0.5%, OBRAS Civic Party at 0.5%, Faith in Peru at 0.5%, A Different Path at 0.4%, IBelieve Party at 0.4%, Front of Hope 2021 at 0.4%, People's Liberty at 0.3%, Federal Democratic Party at 0.3%, Democratic Green Party at 0.3%, First the People at 0.2%, Patriotic Party of Peru a 0.2%, Progresemos at 0.2%, Citizens for Peru at 0.2%, Modern Peru at 0.2%, Venceremos Electoral Alliance at 0.1%, and Regionalist Party of National Integration at 0.1%.)	25.3	23.7	0.1
Datum Internacional/El Comercio	2–6 Jan 2026	1,200	5.8	5.9	5.1	2.3	1.8	2.8	0.2	1.4	2.1	1.2	1.0	1.9	1.0	0.2	1.6	5.1 (Note: Including Modern Peru at 1.5%, OBRAS Civic Party at 0.8%, Force and Liberty at 0.8%, United Peru Democratic Party at 0.7%, Popular Cooperation at 0.6%, A Different Path at 0.6%, Let’s Save Peru at 0.5%, Front of Hope 2021 at 0.4%, Faith in Peru at 0.4%, Purple Party at 0.4%, Venceremos Electoral Alliance at 0.3%, IBelieve Party at 0.3%, Workers and Entrepreneurs Party at 0.3%, First the People at 0.3%, People's Liberty at 0.3%, National Unity at 0.2%, Progresemos at 0.2%, Patriotic Party of Peru a 0.2%, Citizens for Peru at 0.2%, Democratic Green Party at 0.1%, Federal Democratic Party at 0.0%, Peru Action at 0.0%, and Regionalist Party of National Integration at 0.0%.)	23.3	34.1	0.1

=== By political party ===
==== 2025 ====
Pollster / Client	Date	Sample size	Popular Renewal	Popular Force	Popular Action (Peru)	Alliance for Progress (Peru)	We Are Peru	Free Peru	Podemos Perú	AvP	American Popular Revolutionary Alliance	Together for Peru	Country for All		Purple Party	New Peru	Other	Blank / None	Undecided	Lead
Imasolu/Willax	26–29 Dec 2025	1,200	11.3	7.1	–	3.5	3.4	3.3	2.5	2.2	2.0	1.0	0.9	–	–	–	15.8	–	46.9	4.2
Imasolu/Exitosa	24–26 Nov 2025	1,200	13.2	7.4	4.7	4.1	3.1	2.6	2.3	2.3	1.3	1.4	1.3	–	–	–	14.4	–	38.6	5.8
Imasolu/Willax	26–28 Sep 2025	1,200	12.1	6.7	4.5	4.0	3.2	3.4	2.7	3.3	3.2	1.1	1.0	1.0	2.1	–	20.8	–	31.8	5.4
Ipsos Perú/América TV	21–22 Jul 2025	1,205	4	7	5	4	2	4	–	3	2	–	–	–	–	2	19	30	18	2.0
CIT/Expreso	10–12 Jul 2025	1,200	9.8	8.2	3.8	3.7	3.5	2.3	1.0	5.4	3.2	–	3.8	–	–	–	4.9	18.6	30.4	1.6
Ipsos Perú/Perú21	13–14 Apr 2025	1,206	2	9	6	2	2	4	–	2	–	–	–	2	–	–	15	34	22	3.0
Ipsos Perú/Perú21	9–10 Jan 2025	1,214	–	9	6	3	3	2	–	3	2	–	–	3	–	–	18	30	21	3.0

==== 2023–2024 ====
Pollster / Client	Date	Sample size	Popular Force	Popular Action (Peru)	Free Peru	Popular Renewal	Alliance for Progress (Peru)	AvP	We Are Peru		American Popular Revolutionary Alliance	New Peru	Country for All	Together for Peru	Podemos Perú	Purple Party	Other	Blank / None	Undecided	Lead
Ipsos Perú/Perú21	10–11 Oct 2024	1,211	9.0	5.0	2.0	–	2.0	–	3.0	–	2.0	–	–	–	–	–	19	19	39	4.0
Ipsos Perú/Perú21	17–18 Jul 2024	1,218	8.0	4.0	2.0	–	–	2.0	3.0	–	–	–	–	2.0	–	–	26	22	31	2.0
Ipsos Perú/Perú21	9–10 Nov 2023	1,205	8.0	5.0	5.0	3.0	4.0	4.0	4.0	3.0	2.0	–	–	2.0	–	2.0	17	14	27	3.0
Datum International	30 Jun – 4 Jul 2023	896	7.0	6.0	5.0	1.0	3.0	3.0	5.0	2.0	2.0	–	–	2.0	1.0	2.0	4	17	40	1.0
CIT/Expreso (Note: Undecided and/or abstainers excluded)	20–22 Mar 2023	1,200	7.9	3.2	2.2	8.8	5.8	7.1	8.3	0.9	5.0	–	–	3.3	–	1.0	10.0	28.3	8.3	0.6
CIT/Expreso	16–18 Feb 2023	1,200	13.3	6.9	2.9	14.1	10.8	13.0	15.7	1.3	3.3	–	–	4.4	–	2.7	8.2	18.1	6.8	1.6
Ipsos Perú/América TV	9–10 Feb 2023	1,210	8	4	5	3	4	4	–	–	2	–	–	2	1	2	23	13	29	3
CIT/Expreso	18–20 Jan 2023	1,200	9.8	–	1.8	11.3	8.3	10.0	12.0	1.0	–	–	–	3.3	–	2.0	7.5	27.2	5.9	0.7
2021 general	11 Apr 2021	–	11.3; 24	9.0; 16	13.4; 37	9.3; 13	7.5; 15	7.5; 7	6.1; 5	4.6; 0	–	–	–	6.6; 5	5.8; 5	5.4; 3				2.1

== Presidential primaries ==
=== Peruvian Aprista Party ===
Pollster / Client	Date	Sample size					Other	Blank / None	Undecided						
Pollster / Client	Date	Sample size	Valderrama	Del Castillo	Velásquez	Garrido Lecca	Other	Blank / None	Undecided						
Pollster / Client	Date	Sample size	Idp SAC/Diario de Lima	22–24 Aug 2025	200	37	Other	Blank / None	Undecided	34	15	10	5	?	?
Pollster / Client	Date	Sample size	CIT/Expreso	18–20 Aug 2025	1,200	2	Other	Blank / None	Undecided	26	15	–	10	35	12
Ipsos Perú/Perú21	6–7 Aug 2025	1,207	–	17	17	15	7	40	4						

=== Popular Action ===
Pollster / Client	Date	Sample size				Other	Blank / None	Undecided						
Pollster / Client	Date	Sample size	Barnechea	García Belaúnde	Chávez	Other	Blank / None	Undecided						
Pollster / Client	Date	Sample size	CIT/Expreso	18–20 Aug 2025	1,200	Other	Blank / None	Undecided	42	21	6	14	8	9
Pollster / Client	Date	Sample size	Ipsos Perú/Perú21	6–7 Aug 2025	1,207	Other	Blank / None	Undecided	15	34	4	5	35	7
