= Elections in Peru =

In Peru, the people directly elect a head of state (the president) as well as a legislature. The president is elected by the people for a five-year term. The bicameral Congress (Congreso) consists of a Chamber of Deputies (lower house) and a Senate (upper house). The Chamber of Deputies has 130 members, with members elected for a five-year term by proportional representation. Consisting of 60 members, the Senate is elected via a mix of nationwide and regional electoral districts.

Peru has a multi-party system, which effectively bars one party from becoming the sole influence in a decision-making process. As such, parties must work with one another to form coalition governments. The whole election process is held by the National Jury of Elections and the National Office of Electoral Processes. Peru has compulsory voting.

== Background ==
Secret ballots were introduced in 1931, along with an expansion of suffrage to allow all literate males to vote. From 1993 to 2026, Peru had a unicameral legislature. Inaugurations are typically held on July 28.

== Schedule ==
Position	2016	2020	2021	2026
Type	Presidential (April & June); Congress (April); Gubernatorial (April & June)	Congress (January)	Presidential (April & June); National Congress (April); Gubernatorial (April & June)	Presidential (April & June); National Congress (April); Gubernatorial (April & June)
President and vice president	President and vice president	None	President and vice president	President and vice president
Congress	All seats	All seats	All seats	All seats
Provinces, cities and municipalities	All positions	None	All positions	All positions

== Latest elections ==
=== Presidential election ===
The president is elected using the two-round system. The first round of voting allows eligible voters to vote for any viable presidential candidate. The top two candidates who receive a plurality of the vote proceed to the run-off election. The winner of the run-off election and the presidential election is the candidate who receives a plurality of the popular vote. However, if in the first round the candidate who is in the first place already gets more than 50% of the popular vote, that candidate will automatically win the election and a run-off election will no longer be needed.

=== Parliamentary election ===
==== Senate ====
Party	Single National Constituency			Congressional Constiuencies			Total seats
Party	Votes	%	Seats	Votes	%	Seats	Total seats
Popular Force	2,227,962	15.06	7	2,166,895	15.84	15	22
Together for Peru	1,808,783	12.23	5	1,357,453	9.92	9	14
Popular Renewal	1,633,110	11.04	5	1,620,141	11.84	3	8
Party of Good Government	1,549,920	10.48	5	1,574,317	11.51	2	7
Civic Party OBRAS	1,307,340	8.84	4	1,237,374	9.05	1	5
Ahora Nación	1,210,147	8.18	4	1,157,790	8.46	0	4
Country for All	859,371	5.81	0	846,063	6.18	0	0
First the People	524,212	3.54	0	448,850	3.28	0	0
SíCreo Party	405,601	2.74	0	60,382	0.44	0	0
Alliance for Progress	392,855	2.66	0	348,025	2.54	0	0
Podemos Perú	330,893	2.24	0	329,063	2.41	0	0
Peruvian Aprista Party	253,499	1.71	0	247,504	1.81	0	0
Front of Hope 2021	244,112	1.65	0	254,401	1.86	0	0
Agricultural People's Front of Peru	231,172	1.56	0	268,369	1.96	0	0
We Are Peru	201,460	1.36	0	234,351	1.71	0	0
Popular Cooperation	165,841	1.12	0	160,111	1.17	0	0
Peru First	154,881	1.05	0	169,652	1.24	0	0
Progresemos	146,387	0.99	0	127,381	0.93	0	0
Venceremos	135,721	0.92	0	108,681	0.79	0	0
A Different Path	126,930	0.86	0	128,437	0.94	0	0
United Peru Democratic Party	120,395	0.81	0	97,205	0.71	0	0
Patriotic Party of Peru	115,106	0.78	0	55,531	0.41	0	0
Free Peru	112,132	0.76	0	128,231	0.94	0	0
Go on Country – Social Integration Party	74,251	0.50	0	79,121	0.58	0	0
Purple Party	72,942	0.49	0	73,439	0.54	0	0
People's Liberty	68,930	0.47	0	68,939	0.50	0	0
Green Democratic Party	67,909	0.46	0	67,049	0.49	0	0
National Unity	57,605	0.39	0	62,727	0.46	0	0
Democratic Integrity	55,073	0.37	0	55,480	0.41	0	0
Force and Liberty	32,652	0.22	0	38,730	0.28	0	0
Faith in Peru	27,106	0.18	0	18,585	0.14	0	0
Federal Democratic Party	22,105	0.15	0	17,843	0.13	0	0
Peru Action	21,748	0.15	0	19,145	0.14	0	0
PRIN Political Party	21,101	0.14	0	18,866	0.14	0	0
Workers and Entrepreneurs Party	15,989	0.11	0	6,641	0.05	0	0
Let's Save Peru				14,914	0.11	0	0
Modern Peru				12,061	0.09	0	0
Total	14,795,241	100.00	30	13,679,747	100.00	30	60
Valid votes	14,795,241	73.26		13,679,747	67.75		
Invalid votes	3,123,742	15.47		3,268,589	16.19		
Blank votes	2,275,639	11.27		3,244,035	16.07		
Total votes	20,194,622	100.00		20,192,371	100.00		
Registered voters/turnout	27,325,432	73.90		27,325,432	73.90		
Source: ONPE Single District, ONPE Multiple District

==== Chamber of Deputies ====
Party	Votes	%	Seats	+/–
Popular Force	2,114,389	14.66	41	+17
Popular Renewal	1,593,041	11.04	15	+2
Together for Peru	1,553,154	10.77	32	+27
Party of Good Government	1,509,987	10.47	18	New
Ahora Nación	1,224,556	8.49	10	New
Civic Party OBRAS	1,199,888	8.32	14	New
Country for All	838,901	5.82	0	New
First the People	434,740	3.01	0	New
Alliance for Progress	401,468	2.78	0	−15
Podemos Perú	379,812	2.63	0	−5
We Are Peru	308,218	2.14	0	−5
Agricultural People's Front of Peru	272,759	1.89	0	0
Peruvian Aprista Party	268,803	1.86	0	New
SíCreo Party	244,781	1.70	0	New
Front of Hope 2021	241,274	1.67	0	New
Peru First	197,520	1.37	0	New
Popular Cooperation	163,734	1.13	0	New
Venceremos	162,492	1.13	0	New
Free Peru	138,137	0.96	0	−37
Progresemos	134,050	0.93	0	New
A Different Path	129,484	0.90	0	New
Go on Country – Social Integration Party	120,160	0.83	0	−7
People's Liberty	106,347	0.74	0	New
Patriotic Party of Peru	99,216	0.69	0	New
United Peru Democratic Party	93,554	0.65	0	New
Purple Party	88,017	0.61	0	−3
Green Democratic Party	77,126	0.53	0	New
National Unity	71,735	0.50	0	New
Democratic Integrity	60,273	0.42	0	New
Force and Liberty	47,969	0.33	0	New
PRIN Political Party	28,022	0.19	0	New
Faith in Peru	26,894	0.19	0	New
Federal Democratic Party	23,041	0.16	0	New
Let's Save Peru	21,275	0.15	0	New
Peru Action	20,566	0.14	0	New
Modern Peru	18,508	0.13	0	New
Workers and Entrepreneurs Party	12,567	0.09	0	New
Total	14,426,458	100.00	130	0
Valid votes	14,426,458	71.45		
Invalid votes	3,135,238	15.53		
Blank votes	2,629,017	13.02		
Total votes	20,190,713	100.00		
Registered voters/turnout	27,325,432	73.89		
Source: ONPE

== Laws ==
- Sale of alcohol and carrying firearms (except for Members of the Armed Forces and the National Police) are forbidden during an election.
- Political gatherings are forbidden, while public gatherings of any sort are prohibited during voting hours, including religious liturgies and entertainment shows. Clergy of any religion can not participate in their distinctive garments or habits.

== See also ==
- National Jury of Elections
- National Office of Electoral Processes
- Electoral calendar
- Electoral system
