= Presidency of Keiko Fujimori =

Current government of Peru

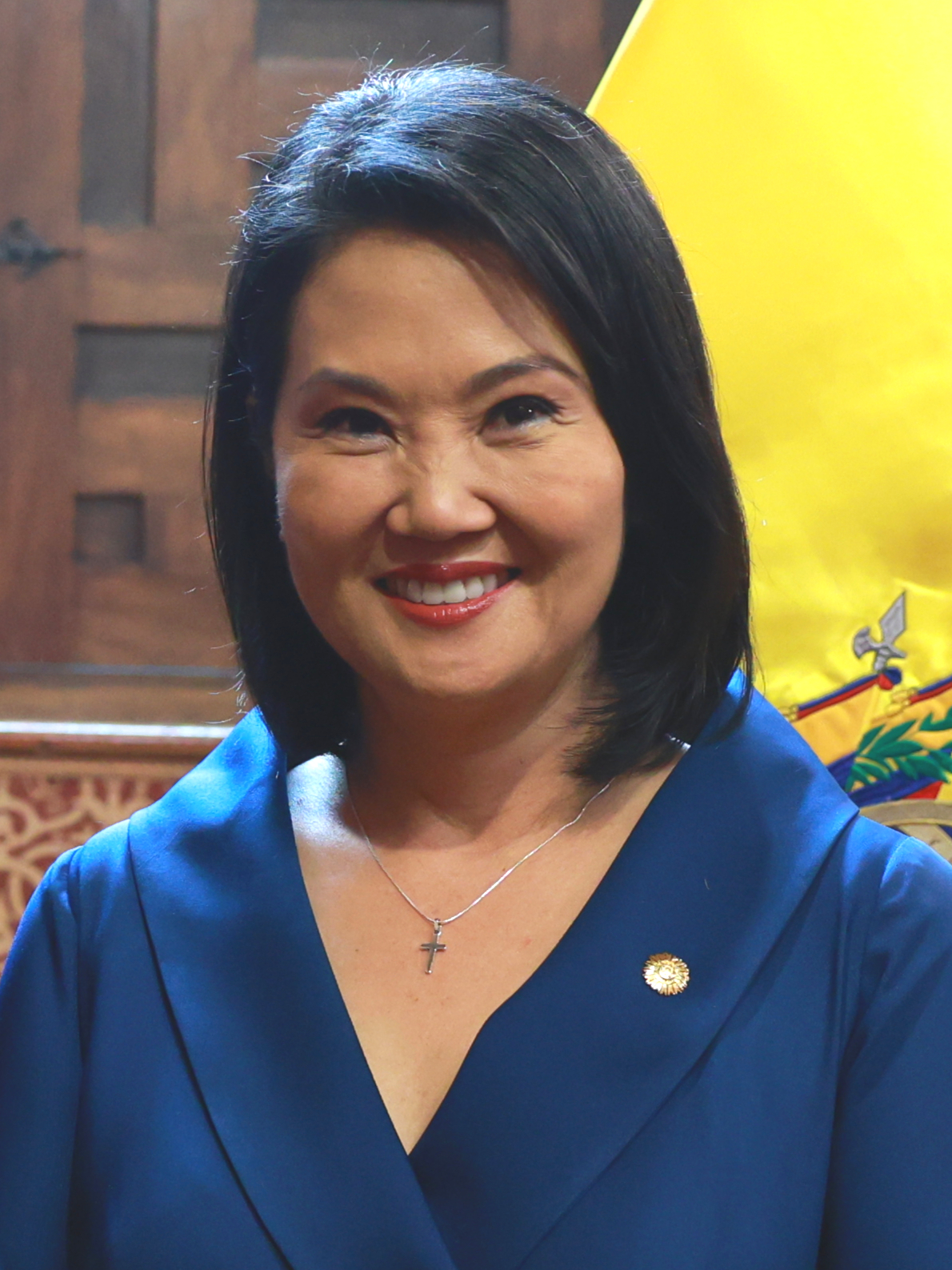
- Presidency of Keiko Fujimori; 28 July 2026 – present
- Prime Minister: Luis Galarreta
- Cabinet: See list
- Party: Fuerza Popular
- Election: 2026
- Seat: Government Palace

Keiko Fujimori's tenure as the President of Peru began with her inauguration on 28 July 2026. Fujimori, a long time leader of the Popular Force party, took office after winning both rounds in the 2026 presidential election, beating party president Roberto Sánchez of Together for Peru by a 0.27% margin. In addition to her presidency, she is the first female president of Peru to be directly elected, and the second female president in general, only after Dina Boluarte. Fujimori is also the second Japanese Peruvian to become president, only after her father Alberto Fujimori. In addition to her presidency, her party also signed a coalition with the far right Popular Renewal party, which gave her a minority in the Chamber of Deputies and half of the Senate, which was re-established in March 2024 after her father previously abolished the Senate in 1993.

== Cabinet ==
Senior Ministers was announced on 27 July 2026. The rest of cabinet was sworn in on 28 July 2026.

Ministry	Cabinet		Minister	Party	Term	
Ministry	Cabinet		Minister	Party	Start	End
Ministry	No.	PCM	Minister	Party	Start	End
President of the Council of Ministers	1	Galarreta	Luis Galarreta	Popular Force	28 July 2026	Incumbent
Ministry of Foreign Affairs	1	Galarreta	Carlos Espá	SíCreo Party	28 July 2026	Incumbent
Ministry of Defense	1	Galarreta	Rafael Belaúnde	People's Liberty	28 July 2026	Incumbent
Ministry of Economy and Finance	1	Galarreta	Elmer Cuba	Independent	28 July 2026	Incumbent
Ministry of the Interior	1	Galarreta	César Astudillo	Independent	28 July 2026	Incumbent
Ministry of Justice and Human Rights	1	Galarreta	Ernesto Álvarez Miranda	Christian People's Party	28 July 2026	Incumbent
Ministry of Education	1	Galarreta	José Antonio Chang	Independent	28 July 2026	Incumbent
Ministry of Health	1	Galarreta	Luis Dyer	Independent	28 July 2026	Incumbent
Ministry of Production	1	Galarreta	Juan Carlos Requejo	Independent	28 July 2026	Incumbent
Ministry of Foreign Trade and Tourism	1	Galarreta	Rogers Valencia	Independent	28 July 2026	Incumbent
Ministry of Energy and Mines	1	Galarreta	Guillermo Shinno	Independent	28 July 2026	Incumbent
Ministry of Transport and Communications	1	Galarreta	Rafael Rey	Independent	28 July 2026	18 September 2026
Ministry of Transport and Communications	1	Galarreta	José Tangherlini	Independent	18 September 2016	Incumbent
Ministry of Housing, Construction and Sanitation	1	Galarreta	Mauricio Arnillas	Popular Force	28 July 2026	Incumbent
Ministry of Women and Vulnerable Populations	1	Galarreta	María Seminario	Independent	28 July 2026	Incumbent
Ministry of the Environment	1	Galarreta	Vladimiro Huaroc	Independent	28 July 2026	Incumbent
Ministry of Culture	1	Galarreta	Alberto Beingolea	Independent	28 July 2026	Incumbent
Ministry of Development and Social Inclusion	1	Galarreta	Maritza Canales	Independent	28 July 2026	Incumbent
