= Cabinet of Peru =

Republic of Peru's Council of Ministers

- Great Seal of the Republic of Peru

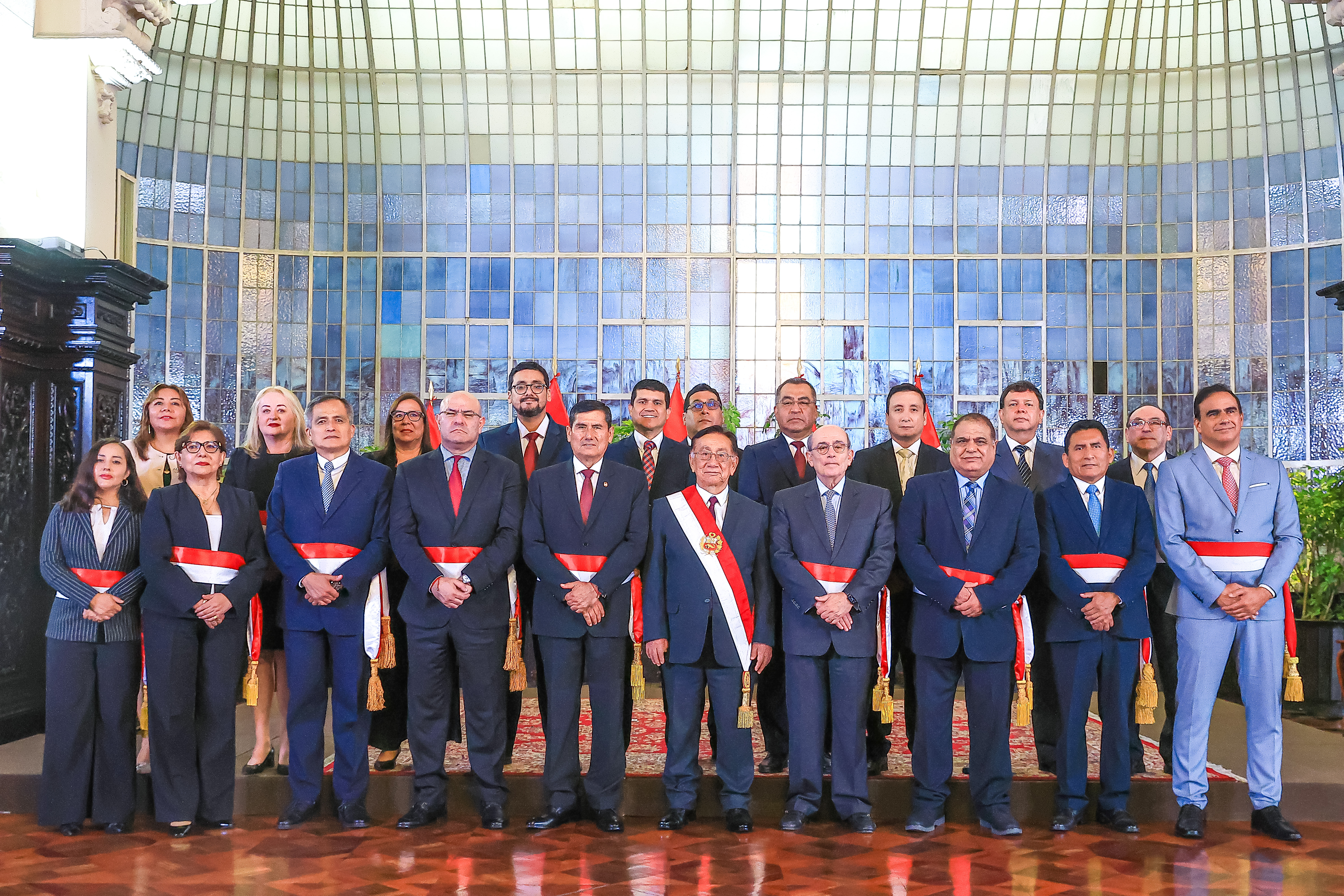
- The previous Cabinet of Peru, March 2026
- Legal status: Active
- Location: Government Palace, Lima, Peru
- President of Peru: Keiko Fujimori
- Prime Minister of Peru: Luis Galarreta
- Website: www.gob.pe

The Cabinet of Peru (also called the Presidential Cabinet of Peru or the Council of Ministers) is composed of all the Ministers of State. The cabinet is presided by the President of the Council of Ministers, a position likened to that of a prime minister. The Prime Minister presides over the meetings of the Council of Ministers, unless the President of the Republic is present.

== Functions ==
The Cabinet has, under the Constitution, the following main duties:

1. Approve laws that the President submits to Congress
2. Approve legislative decrees and also urgent decrees that President of the Republic dictates, as well as laws, decrees, and resolutions arranged by law
3. To deliberate on subjects of public interest.

For the Cabinet to reach any agreement, the approving vote of the majority of its members is required.

== Ministers ==
Ministers of State are in charge of managing politics and the activities of various sectors that direct and manage public services. The requirements to be a Minister of State are to be Peruvian by birth, a citizen, and be at least 25 years of age.

The Ministers of State are appointed discretionally by the President of the Republic, in coordination with the Prime Minister. While individual cabinet members do not require to be confirmed by Congress, when a new Prime Minister is appointed, the entire cabinet is subjected to a Congressional "vote of confidence". Likewise, if the Prime Minister resigns from office, all members of the cabinet are constitutionally forced to resign.

In special situations, a Minister of State in charge of one sector can temporarily assume the role and responsibilities held by another Minister in case of illness, travel, or other absence of the latter. All actions by the President must be approved by the Minister of State in charge of the correspondent sector to be valid under Peruvian law.

== Current Cabinet ==
Ministry	Cabinet		Minister	Party	Term	
Ministry	Cabinet		Minister	Party	Start	End
Ministry	No.	PCM	Minister	Party	Start	End
President of the Council of Ministers	1	Galarreta	Luis Galarreta	Popular Force	28 July 2026	Incumbent
Ministry of Foreign Affairs	1	Galarreta	Carlos Espá	SíCreo Party	28 July 2026	Incumbent
Ministry of Defense	1	Galarreta	Rafael Belaúnde	People's Liberty	28 July 2026	Incumbent
Ministry of Economy and Finance	1	Galarreta	Elmer Cuba	Independent	28 July 2026	Incumbent
Ministry of the Interior	1	Galarreta	César Astudillo	Independent	28 July 2026	Incumbent
Ministry of Justice and Human Rights	1	Galarreta	Ernesto Álvarez Miranda	Christian People's Party	28 July 2026	Incumbent
Ministry of Education	1	Galarreta	José Antonio Chang	Independent	28 July 2026	Incumbent
Ministry of Health	1	Galarreta	Luis Dyer	Independent	28 July 2026	Incumbent
Ministry of Production	1	Galarreta	Juan Carlos Requejo	Independent	28 July 2026	Incumbent
Ministry of Foreign Trade and Tourism	1	Galarreta	Rogers Valencia	Independent	28 July 2026	Incumbent
Ministry of Energy and Mines	1	Galarreta	Guillermo Shinno	Independent	28 July 2026	Incumbent
Ministry of Transport and Communications	1	Galarreta	Rafael Rey	Independent	28 July 2026	18 September 2026
Ministry of Transport and Communications	1	Galarreta	José Tangherlini	Independent	18 September 2016	Incumbent
Ministry of Housing, Construction and Sanitation	1	Galarreta	Mauricio Arnillas	Popular Force	28 July 2026	Incumbent
Ministry of Women and Vulnerable Populations	1	Galarreta	María Seminario	Independent	28 July 2026	Incumbent
Ministry of the Environment	1	Galarreta	Vladimiro Huaroc	Independent	28 July 2026	Incumbent
Ministry of Culture	1	Galarreta	Alberto Beingolea	Independent	28 July 2026	Incumbent
Ministry of Development and Social Inclusion	1	Galarreta	Maritza Canales	Independent	28 July 2026	Incumbent
