= Cabinet of Keiko Fujimori =

Current government of Peru

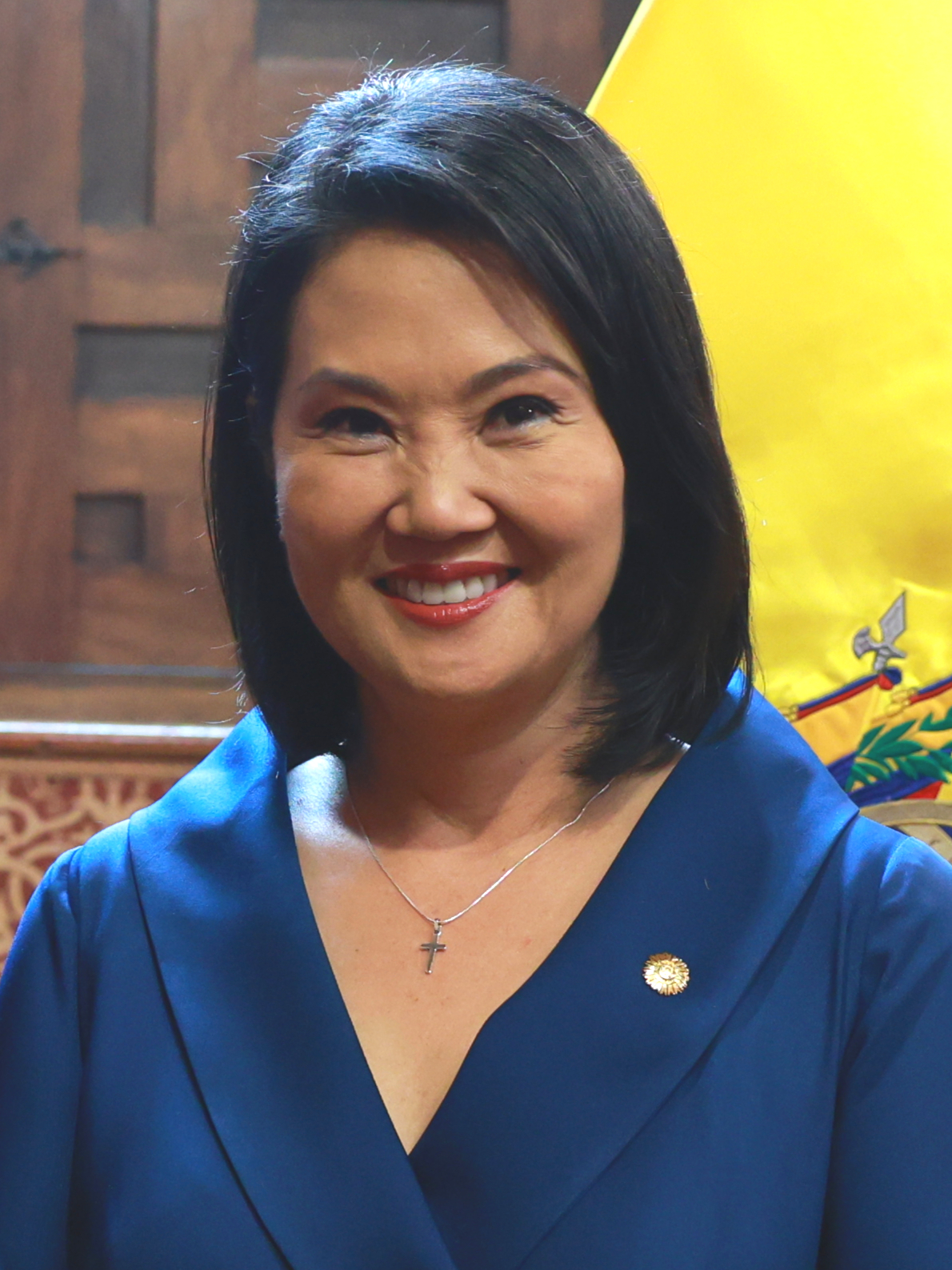
- Presidency of Keiko Fujimori; 28 July 2026 – present
- Prime Minister: Luis Galarreta
- Cabinet: See list
- Party: Fuerza Popular
- Election: 2026
- Seat: Government Palace

Keiko Fujimori's tenure as the President of Peru began with her inauguration on 28 July 2026. Fujimori, a long time leader of the Popular Force party, took office after winning both rounds in the 2026 presidential election, beating party president Roberto Sánchez of Together for Peru by a 0.27% margin. In addition to her presidency, she is the first female president of Peru to be directly elected, and the second female president in general, only after Dina Boluarte. Fujimori is also the second Japanese Peruvian to become president, only after her father Alberto Fujimori. In addition to her presidency, her party also signed a coalition with the far right Popular Renewal party, which gave her a minority in the Chamber of Deputies and half of the Senate, which was re-established in March 2024 after her father previously abolished the Senate in 1993.

== Cabinet ==
Senior Ministers was announced on 27 July 2026. The rest of cabinet was sworn in on 28 July 2026.

| Ministry | Cabinet | | Minister | Party | Term | |
| Ministry | Cabinet | | Minister | Party | Start | End |
| Ministry | No. | PCM | Minister | Party | Start | End |
|---|---|---|---|---|---|---|
| President of the Council of Ministers | 1 | Galarreta | Luis Galarreta | Popular Force | 28 July 2026 | Incumbent |
| Ministry of Foreign Affairs | 1 | Galarreta | Carlos Espá | SíCreo Party | 28 July 2026 | Incumbent |
| Ministry of Defense | 1 | Galarreta | Rafael Belaúnde | People's Liberty | 28 July 2026 | Incumbent |
| Ministry of Economy and Finance | 1 | Galarreta | Elmer Cuba | Independent | 28 July 2026 | Incumbent |
| Ministry of the Interior | 1 | Galarreta | César Astudillo | Independent | 28 July 2026 | Incumbent |
| Ministry of Justice and Human Rights | 1 | Galarreta | Ernesto Álvarez Miranda | Christian People's Party | 28 July 2026 | Incumbent |
| Ministry of Education | 1 | Galarreta | José Antonio Chang | Independent | 28 July 2026 | Incumbent |
| Ministry of Health | 1 | Galarreta | Luis Dyer | Independent | 28 July 2026 | Incumbent |
| Ministry of Production | 1 | Galarreta | Juan Carlos Requejo | Independent | 28 July 2026 | Incumbent |
| Ministry of Foreign Trade and Tourism | 1 | Galarreta | Rogers Valencia | Independent | 28 July 2026 | Incumbent |
| Ministry of Energy and Mines | 1 | Galarreta | Guillermo Shinno | Independent | 28 July 2026 | Incumbent |
| Ministry of Transport and Communications | 1 | Galarreta | Rafael Rey | Independent | 28 July 2026 | 18 September 2026 |
| Ministry of Transport and Communications | 1 | Galarreta | José Tangherlini | Independent | 18 September 2016 | Incumbent |
| Ministry of Housing, Construction and Sanitation | 1 | Galarreta | Mauricio Arnillas | Popular Force | 28 July 2026 | Incumbent |
| Ministry of Women and Vulnerable Populations | 1 | Galarreta | María Seminario | Independent | 28 July 2026 | Incumbent |
| Ministry of the Environment | 1 | Galarreta | Vladimiro Huaroc | Independent | 28 July 2026 | Incumbent |
| Ministry of Culture | 1 | Galarreta | Alberto Beingolea | Independent | 28 July 2026 | Incumbent |
| Ministry of Development and Social Inclusion | 1 | Galarreta | Maritza Canales | Independent | 28 July 2026 | Incumbent |
