= Antonio Ortiz =

Antonio Ortiz may refer to:

- Antonio Ortiz Echagüe, Spanish painter
- Antonio Ortiz Fuster, Spanish cartoonist
- Antonio Ortiz Gacto, Spanish artist
- Antonio Ortiz García, Spanish architect
- Antonio Ortiz Mayans, Paraguayan author and composer
- Antonio Ortiz Mena, Mexican economist
- Antonio Ortiz Muñoz, Spanish novelist
- Antonio Ortiz Ramírez, Spanish anarchist
