= Mario Vizcarra =

Peruvian engineer

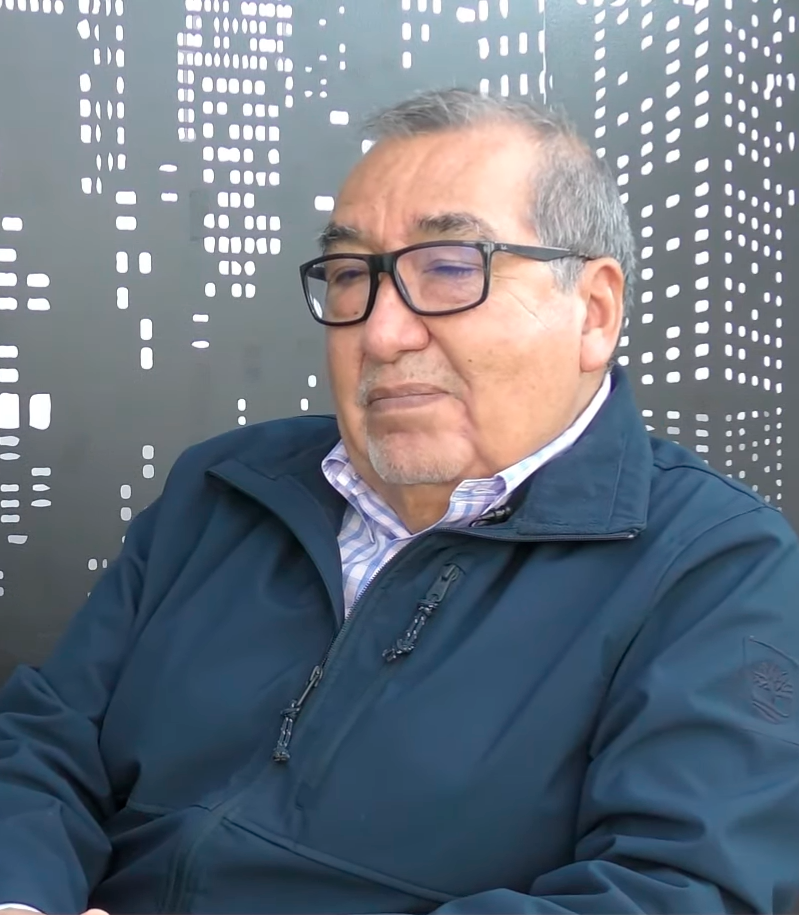
- Vizacarra in 2025
- Born: Mario Vizcarra Cornejo; 12 June 1954 (age 72); Moquegua, Peru
- Occupation: Engineer
- Relatives: Martín Vizcarra (brother)

Mario Vizcarra Cornejo (born 12 June 1954) is a Peruvian engineer and brother of former president of Peru, Martín Vizcarra. In December 2025, he received support from Peru First to be their candidate for president in 2026 Peruvian general election.

== Biography ==
Vizcarra was involved in the election campaigns of his brother Martín, assisting him in the 2006 Peruvian general election and the 2011 Peruvian general election. He has long been involved as a member of his brother's political party, Peru First, serving as a member of the party's National Political Commission since 2015.

In August 2025, Vizcarra was placed in preventative detention due to corruption allegations involved reported embezzlement.

After being listed as a frontrunner as a presidential candidate in the 2026 Peruvian general election, Vizcarra denied his intention to run, believing his brother would have his disqualification from holding public office overturned and he would be able to run for president. In the poll, about 71% of respondents made the mistake of believing Mario was Martín. Despite this, a later poll showed Vizcarra becoming the second most popular presidential candidate by mid-October 2025.

After his brother's disqualification was upheld, Vizcarra filed as a candidate and was selected as Peru First's nominee in December 2025. In January 2026, the National Jury of Elections (JNE) declared his ticket ineligible due to his past convictions for embezzlement. Peru First appealed and the decision was reversed, allowing him to proceed with his campaign. He did not advance to the second round.
