= Modern Force =

Political party in Peru

Modern Force Fuerza Moderna
- President: Fiorella Molinelli
- Founded: 6 May 2023
- Headquarters: Lima
- Ideology: Liberalism
- Political position: Centre to centre-right
- Colors: Blue Green

Website
- https://www.fuerzamoderna.org.pe/

Modern Force, officially the Modern Force Political Party (Spanish: Partido Político Fuerza Moderna), is a centrist political party in Peru. Founded in May 2023, the party is led by economist Fiorella Molinelli, former Minister of Social Development and Inclusion.

The party is projected to participate in the 2026 general election with Molinelli as its presumptive presidential nominee and an influx of health policy officials as part of her team.

Among its most prominent members is former president Pedro Pablo Kuczynski, invited to join the party on behalf of Molinelli and former Peruvians for Change members.
