= Modern Peru =

Political party in Peru

Modern Peru Perú Moderno
- President: Wilson Aragón Ponce
- Founded: 30 August 2021
- Headquarters: Lima
- Ideology: Liberalism
- Political position: Centre-right
- Colors: Pink Yellow

Website
- https://perumoderno.com/

Modern Peru (Spanish: Perú Moderno) is a political party in Peru. Founded and led by businessman Wilson Aragón Ponce, the party gained notoriety as its executive committee is entirely composed of the founder's family.

Upon confirming partisan registration at the National Jury of Elections in 2024, the party announced the affiliation of Ajegroup businessman Carlos Añaños, signaling a potential presidential run at the 2026 general election. Nevertheless, Añaños rescinded his presidential aspirations following discrepancies with the party leader Aragón on congressional candidate fielding. Añaños subsequently left the party.

Among its members running for the party's presidential nomination for 2026 are incumbent congressman Carlos Anderson, former minister of Energy and Mines, Rómulo Mucho, and architect Pedro Guevara.

== Election results ==
=== Presidential ===
Election	Candidate	First round		Second round		Result
Election	Candidate	Votes	%	Votes	%	Result
2026	Carlos Jaico	9,801	0.06	—N/a		Lost ✗

=== Congressional ===
==== Chamber of Deputies ====
Election	Leader	Votes	%	Seats	+/–	Rank	Government
2026	Wilson Aragón Ponce	18,508	0.13	0 / 130	New	▲36th	Extra-parliamentary

==== Senate ====
Election	Leader	Votes	%	Seats	+/–	Rank	Government
2026	Wilson Aragón Ponce	12,061	0.09	0 / 60		▲37th	Extra-parliamentary
