= Unity and Peace =

Political party in Peru

Unity and Peace Party Partido Unidad y Paz
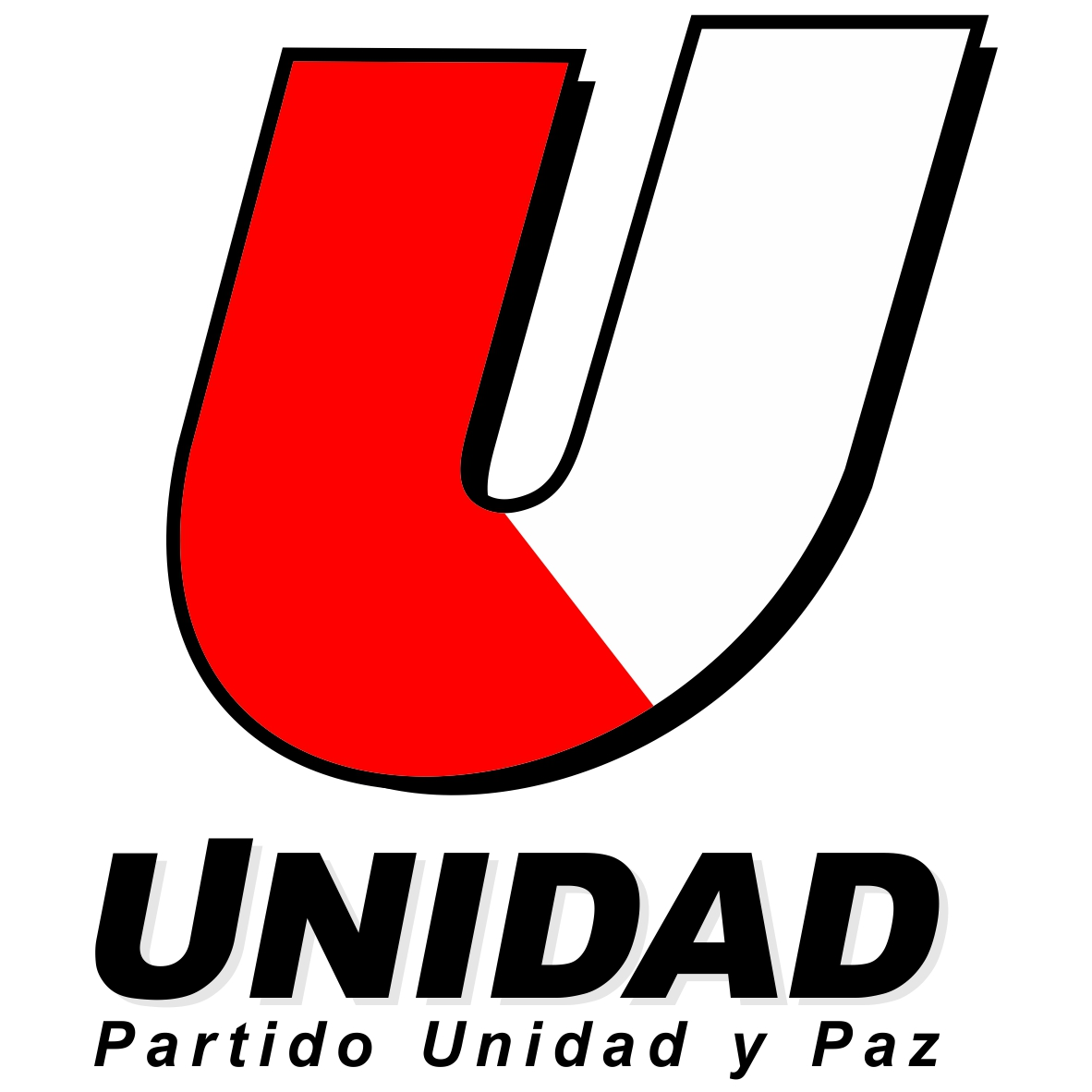
- President: Roberto Chiabra
- General Secretary: Ramón Barúa Lecaros
- Founded: 29 March 2023
- Headquarters: Lima
- Membership (2025): 29,597
- Ideology: Liberalism
- Political position: Centre-right
- National affiliation: National Unity
- Colors: Red and white (Peruvian national colours)
- Congress: 0 / 130
- Governorships: 0 / 25
- Regional Councillors: 0 / 274
- Province Mayorships: 0 / 196
- District Mayorships: 0 / 1,874

Website
- https://www.unidadypaz.org.pe/

Unity and Peace Party (Spanish: Partido Unidad y Paz) is a centre-right political party in Peru. Founded in September 2023, the party is led by Roberto Chiabra, former General Commander of the Peruvian Army, former Minister of Defense, and incumbent Member of Congress.

The party participated in the 2026 general election with Chiabra as its presidential nominee in a coalition with the historical Christian People's Party.

== Election results ==
=== Presidential ===
Election	Candidate	First round		Second round		Result
Election	Candidate	Votes	%	Votes	%	Result
2026 (Note: As part of National Unity)	Roberto Chiabra	67,939	0.41	—N/a		Lost ✗

=== Congressional ===
==== Chamber of Deputies ====
Election	Leader	Votes	%	Seats	+/–	Rank	Government
2026	Roberto Chiabra	71,735	0.50	0 / 130	New	▲15th	Extra-parliamentary

==== Senate ====
Election	Leader	Votes	%	Seats	+/–	Rank	Government
2026	Roberto Chiabra	57,605	0.39	0 / 60		▲12th	Extra-parliamentary
