= Julio Chávez (politician) =

Peruvian politician (born 1981)

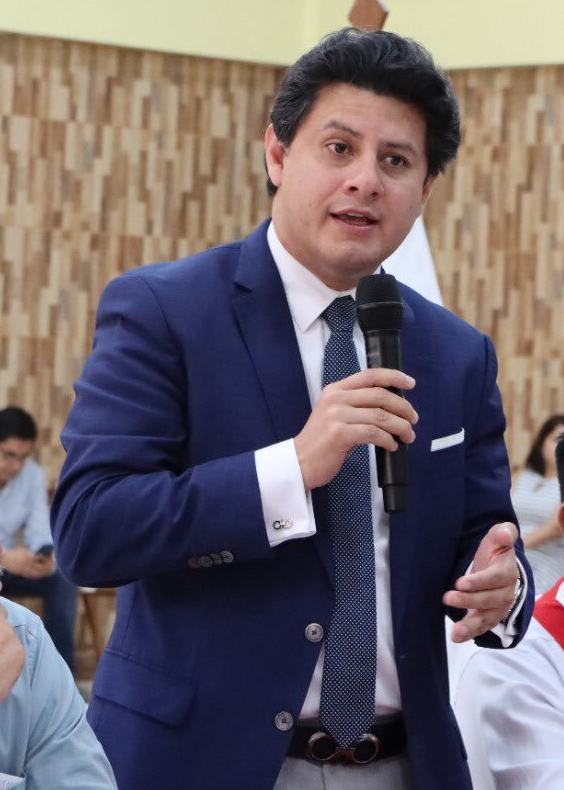
- Chávez in 2024

President of Popular Action
- Incumbent
- Assumed office 24 June 2024
- Preceded by: Mesías Guevara

Personal details
- Born: 22 July 1981 (age 44)
- Party: Popular Action (since 2004)
- Spouse: Leslye Lazo

Julio Abraham Chávez Chiong (born 22 July 1981) is a Peruvian politician serving as president of Popular Action since 2024. From 2019 to 2022, he served as mayor of San Martín de Porres. He is married to Leslye Lazo.
