= Peru Action =

Centre-right Peruvian political party

Peru Action Perú Acción
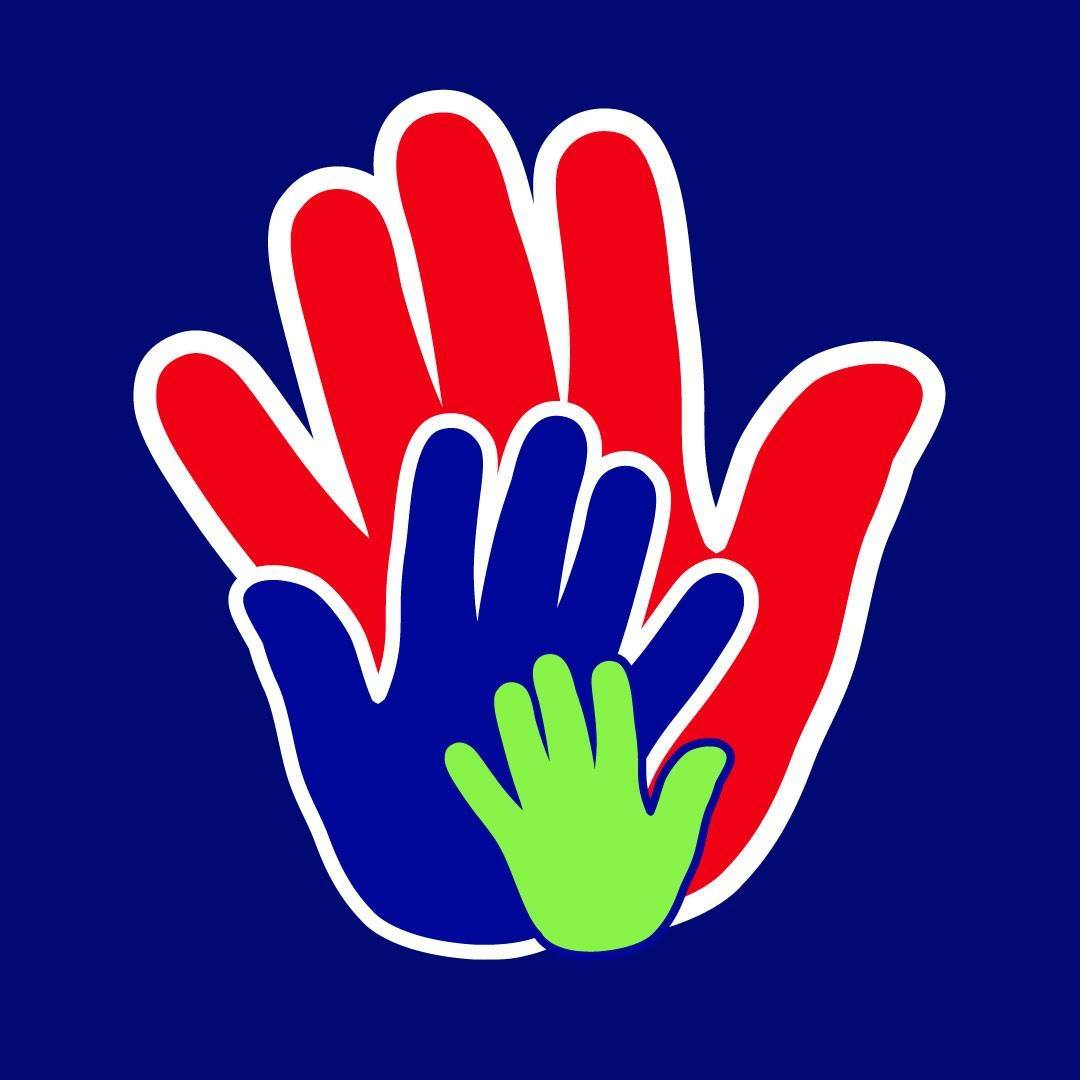
- Abbreviation: PA
- President: Francisco Diez Canseco Távara
- Founded: November 28, 2015
- Headquarters: Lima
- Ideology: Social conservatism Christian democracy
- Political position: Centre-right to right-wing
- Congress: 0 / 130
- Governorships: 0 / 25
- Regional Councillors: 0 / 274
- Province Mayorships: 0 / 196
- District Mayorships: 0 / 1,874

Peru Action (Spanish: Perú Acción, PA) (previously Peru Nation (Spanish: Perú Nación, PN) is a minor centre-right Peruvian political party.

== History ==
The party's logo as Peru Nation.

Founded in November 2015 by former congressman Francisco Diez Canseco Távara as Peru Nation, the party initially participated in the 2016 general election, but withdrew its presidential ticket and congressional lists ten days before the election, amid the risk of failing to pass the electoral threshold.

At the legislative elections held on 26 January 2020, the party won 1.4% of the popular vote but no seats in the Congress of the Republic, placing 21st out of the 22 participating congressional lists.

It was confirmed that they would participate in the general elections of Peru in 2021, with which Francisco Diez Canseco Távara was running as presidential candidate, along with Nancy Cáceres and Manuel Salazar as vice presidents.

The ticket was ultimately dismissed by the National Jury of Elections as the party failed to register the ticket on time. As a consequence, the party lost its registration at the jury in the aftermath of the general election, on 7 September 2021.

The party is currently undergoing a second registration under the name Peru Action.

== Election results ==
=== Presidential elections ===
Election	Candidate	First round		Second round		Result
Election	Candidate	Votes	%	Votes	%	Result
2016	Francisco Diez Canseco	Ticket withdrawn				
2021	Francisco Diez Canseco	Ticket rejected				
2026	Francisco Diez Canseco	31,710	0.19	—N/a		Lost ✗

=== Congressional elections ===
==== Unicameral Congress of the Republic ====
Year	Votes	%	Seats	▲/▼	Position
2016	List withdrawn				
2020	206 128	1.4%	0 / 130	New	Extra-parliamentary

==== Chamber of Deputies ====
Election	Leader	Votes	%	Seats	+/–	Rank	Government
2026	Francisco Diez Canseco	20,566	0.14	0 / 130	0	▲35th	Extra-parliamentary

==== Senate ====
Election	Leader	Votes	%	Seats	+/–	Rank	Government
2026	Francisco Diez Canseco	21,748	0.15	0 / 60		▲33th	Extra-parliamentary

=== Regional and municipal elections ===
Year	Regional Governors	Province Mayors	District Mayors
Year	Outcome	Outcome	Outcome
2018	0 / 25	0 / 196	1 / 1,874
