= Alex González (boxer) =

Puerto Rican boxer

Personal information
- Full name: Alexander González Laureano
- Nationality: Puerto Rican
- Born: 18 May 1974 (age 52) Vega Baja, Puerto Rico

Sport
- Sport: Boxing

Alexander González Laureano (born 18 May 1974) is a Puerto Rican boxer. He competed in the men's light heavyweight event at the 1992 Summer Olympics.
