= Fiorella Molinelli =

Peruvian politician (born 1974)

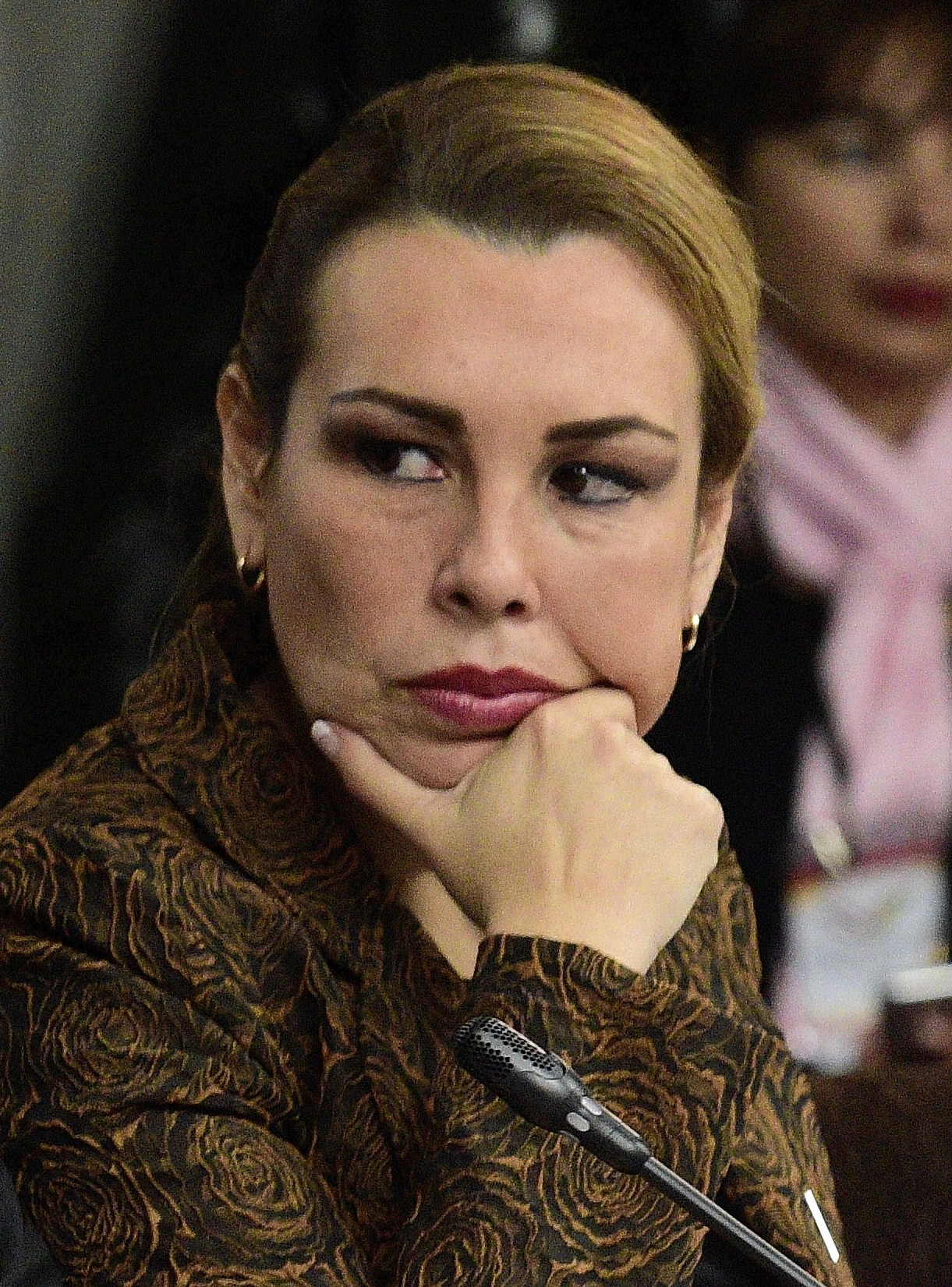
- Molinelli in 2017

Minister of Development and Social Inclusion
- In office 27 July 2017 – 9 January 2018
- President: Pedro Pablo Kuczynski
- Prime Minister: Mercedes Aráoz
- Preceded by: Cayetana Aljovín
- Succeeded by: Jorge Meléndez Celis

Personal details
- Born: 20 March 1974 (age 52)
- Party: Modern Force (since 2023)

Fiorella Giannina Molinelli Aristondo (born 20 March 1974) is a Peruvian politician. From 2017 to 2018, she served as minister of development and social inclusion. From 2018 to 2021, she served as president of EsSalud.
