= Ortifus =

Spanish political cartoonist (born 1948)

Orifus
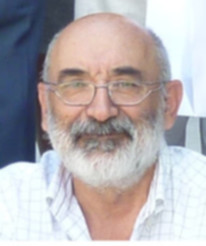
- Antoni Ortifus
- Born: 11 March 1948; Valencia, Spain
- Occupation: Cartoonist

Antonio Ortiz Fuster, more commonly known as his pseudonym, Ortifus, is a political cartoonist, born in Valencia, Spain in 1948. Widely considered to be one of the best cartoonists and illustrators to come out of the Valencia Community, he started his professional life as a musician, jewellery maker, and textile designer. His music gained notability during the 1970s, when he was bassist for the bands Control and Orquesta Valencia, with whom he recorded three and two albums respectively.

However, he is more widely known as a cartoonist and humourist, a career that he got into in the 1980s, when his cartoons began to be published in a number of regional newspapers, including Diario de Valencia, Noticias al Día, Hoja del Lunes and in magazines such as Qué y Donde and the national satirical magazine, El Jueves. In 1984, he would find a permanent job as cartoonist for Levante - El Mercantil Valenciano; his cartoons would become, as time went by, one of the identifying features of the L-EMV. On top of this, he has assiduously drawn for Cartelera Turia and draws a weekly sketch for the national magazine, Magazine, for whom he created his famous character, the wizard Mago Asín.

His work has gone beyond that of a newspaper cartoonist. He has collaborated with the University of Valencia, the Polytechnic University of Valencia, the Generalitat Valenciana and The Pharmaceutical College of Valencia (on whose publication, Cuadernos de Farmática, he draws from time to time.) He has also been called upon on a number of occasions by the Valencian City Council to design monuments for the festival of Falles.

His drawing style is characterised by simple, straight lines and his comic strips in general are typified by irony, word play, and a progressive stance on world issues.

== Publications ==
A list of books in which Ortifus has featured:

- 2003 – De juzgado de guardia
- 2001 - Los guardias civiles: esos ciudadanos uniformados : 25 años de lucha por la democratización y el asociacionismo en la Guardia Civil (1976–2001)
- 1994 - Consejos prácticos para ir por la vida con sumo cuidado
- 1992 - De todo hay en las viñetas del señor
- 1991 - 129 semanas y media
- 1991 - Com exercir de funcionari i no apergaminar-se en l'intent
- 1991 - Estius a la carta
- 1991 - XIP-xap: cançons infantils
- 1987 - Invasor, el último
- 1985 - Humor gràfic en la premsa valenciana, 1981–1985
