= Peru First =

Political party in Peru

Peru First Perú Primero
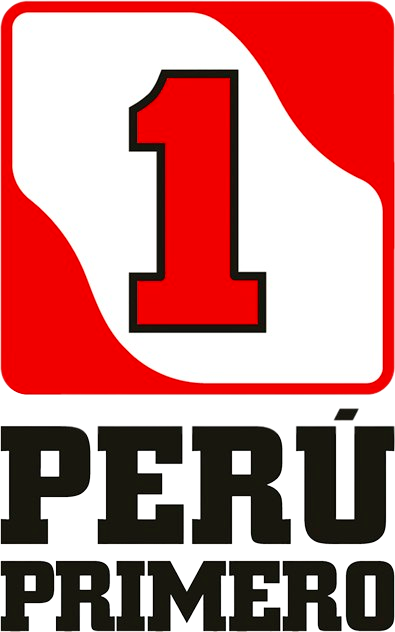
- Abbreviation: P1
- Leader: Martín Vizcarra
- General Secretary: César Figueredo
- Founded: 8 November 2021
- Headquarters: San Isidro, Lima
- Ideology: Big tent Social liberalism Reformism; Decentralization; Anti-corruption; Anti-Fujimorism
- Political position: Centre
- Colors: Red
- Governorships: 1 / 25

Peru First (Spanish: Perú Primero), officially the Peru First Political Party (Spanish: Partido Político Perú Primero), is a Peruvian political party. Founded in 2021, the party is led by Martín Vizcarra, former President of Peru from 2018 to 2020.

The party completed its registration process at the National Jury of Elections in order to participate in the 2026 general election. During the Peruvian protests of 2022 and 2023, the party supported demonstrations against the government of Dina Boluarte and the Congress of Peru, which Vizcarra described as a "dictatorship".

== Election results ==
=== Presidential ===
Election	Candidate	First round		Second round	Result
Election	Candidate	Votes	%	Votes	Result
2026	Mario Vizcarra	143,908	0.86		Lost ✗

=== Congressional ===
==== Chamber of Deputies ====
Election	Leader	Votes	%	Seats	+/–	Rank	Government
2026	Martín Vizcarra	197,520	1.37	0 / 130	New	▲16th	Extra-parliamentary

==== Senate ====
Election	Leader	Votes	%	Seats	+/–	Rank	Government
2026	Martín Vizcarra	154,881	1.05	0 / 60		▲17th	Extra-parliamentary
