= Antonio Ortiz Gacto =

Spanish artist (1941–2011)

- Born: December 3, 1941; Córdoba, Spain
- Died: April 30, 2011 (aged 69); Aguadulce, Spain
- Known for: Architect, artist (painter and draughter)

Antonio Ortiz Gacto (December 3, 1941 – April 30, 2011) was a Spanish artist from Almería in Andalusia, Spain. He became well known as architect and artist (painter and draughtsman).

== Biography ==
Ortiz Gacto was born in Córdoba. As architect he designed many houses and buildings in the province Almería. His style is characterized by dynamic, Mediterranean and especially warm, human structures. He gained local fame especially because of his futuristic design of the church from Aguadulce (1981) ("Iglesia de Aguadulce").

As an artist, he was known by the local art elite, but unknown to the general public. In his early years, he has held several exhibitions of his paintings and drawings in Almería. In his later years as an artist, he lived a secluded life in his studio. The paintings of Antonio Ortiz Gacto are characterized by explosive colors; his drawings by simple brush strokes. His whole portfolio consists of nearly 1,000 paintings and drawings.

Antonio Ortiz Gacto died at age 69 in the house he had designed for himself, "Casa Ortiz" at Aguadulce. The funeral ceremonies were held in his own church of "Iglesia Aguadulce".

== Foundation ==
In 2016, a foundation was established to preserve the work of Antonio Ortiz Gacto. The foundation wants to restore his artwork, and disclose and exhibit it to the public.
