= Progresemos =

Political party in Peru

Let’s Progress Progresemos
- President: Paul Jaimes Blanco
- Founded: 22 November 2023
- Headquarters: Lima
- Ideology: Ecologism; Animal welfare
- Colors: Green Yellow

Website
- https://progresemos.pe/

Let's Progress (Spanish: Progresemos) is a Peruvian political party focused on ecological politics and animal welfare. Founded in November 2023, the party is led by attorney Paul Jaimes Blanco, former general secretary of the Peruvian Ministry of Agricultural Development and Irrigation.

The party is projected to participate in the 2026 general election with economist and former Avanza País presidential nominee, Hernando de Soto, as its presumptive presidential nominee in a potential broad coalition.

== Election results ==
=== Presidential ===
Election	Candidate	First round		Second round		Result
Election	Candidate	Votes	%	Votes	%	Result
2026	Paul Jaimes	66,046	0.39	—N/a		Lost ✗

=== Congressional ===
==== Chamber of Deputies ====
Election	Leader	Votes	%	Seats	+/–	Rank	Government
2026	Paul Jaimes	134,050	0.93	0 / 130	New	▲20th	Extra-parliamentary

==== Senate ====
Election	Leader	Votes	%	Seats	+/–	Rank	Government
2026	Paul Jaimes	146,387	0.99	0 / 60		▲18th	Extra-parliamentary
