= Country for All =

Political party in Peru

Country for All Party Partido País para Todos
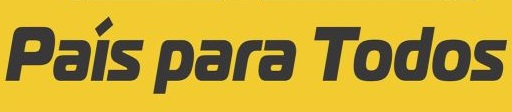
- President: Vladimir Meza Villarreal
- General Secretary: Delsy Romero Álvarez
- Founded: 25 April 2023
- Headquarters: Lima
- Membership (2026): 52,039
- Colors: Yellow

Website
- https://www.partidopaisparatodos.org.pe/

Country for All Party (Spanish: Partido País para Todos) is a political party in Peru. Founded in September 2023, the party is led by Vladimir Meza Villarreal, a former mayor of the Huaraz Province with ties to the Pedro Castillo administration and currently under investigation for alleged corruption from his mayoral tenure.

The party is projected to participate in the 2026 general election with comedian Carlos Álvarez as its presumptive presidential nominee following the announcement of his party affiliation on 5 July 2024.

== Election results ==
=== Presidential ===
| Election | Candidate | First round | | Second round | | Result |
| Election | Candidate | Votes | % | Votes | % | Result |
|---|---|---|---|---|---|---|
| 2026 | Carlos Álvarez | 1,326,717 | 7.93 | | | Lost ✗ |

=== Congressional ===
==== Chamber of Deputies ====
| Election | Leader | Votes | % | Seats | +/– | Rank | Government |
|---|---|---|---|---|---|---|---|
| 2026 | Vladimir Meza Villarreal | 838,901 | 5.82 | 0 / 130 | New | ▲7th | Extra-parliamentary |

==== Senate ====
| Election | Leader | Votes | % | Seats | +/– | Rank | Government |
|---|---|---|---|---|---|---|---|
| 2026 | Vladimir Meza Villarreal | 859,371 | 5.81 | 0 / 60 | | ▲7th | Extra-parliamentary |
