= National Unity (Peru, 2025) =

National Unity Unidad Nacional
- Abbreviation: UN
- Leader: Roberto Chiabra
- Founded: 12 July 2025
- Headquarters: Lima, Peru
- Ideology: Christian democracy Liberal conservatism Conservatism; Liberalism; Neoliberalism
- Political position: Centre-right to right-wing

National Unity (Spanish: Unidad Nacional, UN) is a Peruvian electoral coalition composed of the Christian People's Party - PPC, the Unity and Peace Party, and Peruvians United: We Are Free. The coalition's name reflects its ideological continuity with a previous centre-right alliance led by the PPC, which backed Lourdes Flores as its presidential candidate in the 2001 and 2006 general elections.

The coalition participated in the 2026 general election with incumbent congressman Roberto Chiabra (Unity and Peace) as its presidential nominee.

== Members of National Unity ==
Party	Ideology	Leader	Logo	Notes
Christian People's Party	Christian democracy Social conservatism	Carlos Neuhaus		Oldest active party of the coalition.
Unity and Peace	Liberalism	Roberto Chiabra		Party led by the coalition’s presidential nominee.
Peruvians United: We Are Free!	Liberal conservatism	Renán Galindo Peralta		Third and last party to join the coalition. Founded by prosecutor Tomás Gálvez.

== Election results ==
=== Presidential ===
Election	Candidate	First round		Second round		Result
Election	Candidate	Votes	%	Votes	%	Result
2026	Roberto Chiabra	67,939	0.41	—N/a		Lost ✗

=== Congressional ===
==== Chamber of Deputies ====
Election	Leader	Votes	%	Seats	+/–	Rank	Government
2026	Roberto Chiabra	71,735	0.50	0 / 130	New	▲28th	Extra-parliamentary

==== Senate ====
Election	Leader	Votes	%	Seats	+/–	Rank	Government
2026	Roberto Chiabra	57,605	0.39	0 / 60		▲28th	Extra-parliamentary

== See also ==
- National Unity (Peru, 2000)
- Lourdes Flores
- Javier Bedoya Denegri
