= People's Liberty =

Political party in Peru

People's Liberty Libertad Popular
- Abbreviation: LP
- President: Rafael Belaúnde Llosa
- General Secretary: Diana Álvarez-Calderón
- Founded: 31 December 2021
- Registered: 2023
- Headquarters: Independencia, Lima
- Ideology: Liberalism
- Political position: Centre-right to right-wing
- Colors: Yellow; Black

Website
- www.libertadpopular.org

People's Liberty (Spanish: Libertad Popular) or Popular Liberty, is a liberal political party in Peru. The party is led by Rafael Belaúnde Llosa, former minister of Energy and Mines briefly in 2020.

The party is registered at the National Jury of Elections in order to participate in the next Peruvian general election.

== Election results ==
=== Presidential ===
Election	Candidate	First round		Second round		Result
Election	Candidate	Votes	%	Votes	%	Result
2026	Rafael Belaúnde	40,870	0.24	—N/a		Lost ✗

=== Congressional ===
==== Chamber of Deputies ====
Election	Leader	Votes	%	Seats	+/–	Rank	Government
2026	Rafael Belaúnde	106,347	0.74	0 / 130	New	▲23th	Extra-parliamentary

==== Senate ====
Election	Leader	Votes	%	Seats	+/–	Rank	Government
2026	Rafael Belaúnde	68,930	0.37	0 / 60		▲26th	Extra-parliamentary

== See also ==
- Liberty Movement
- Pedro Cateriano
