= Carlos Espá =

Peruvian journalist and politician

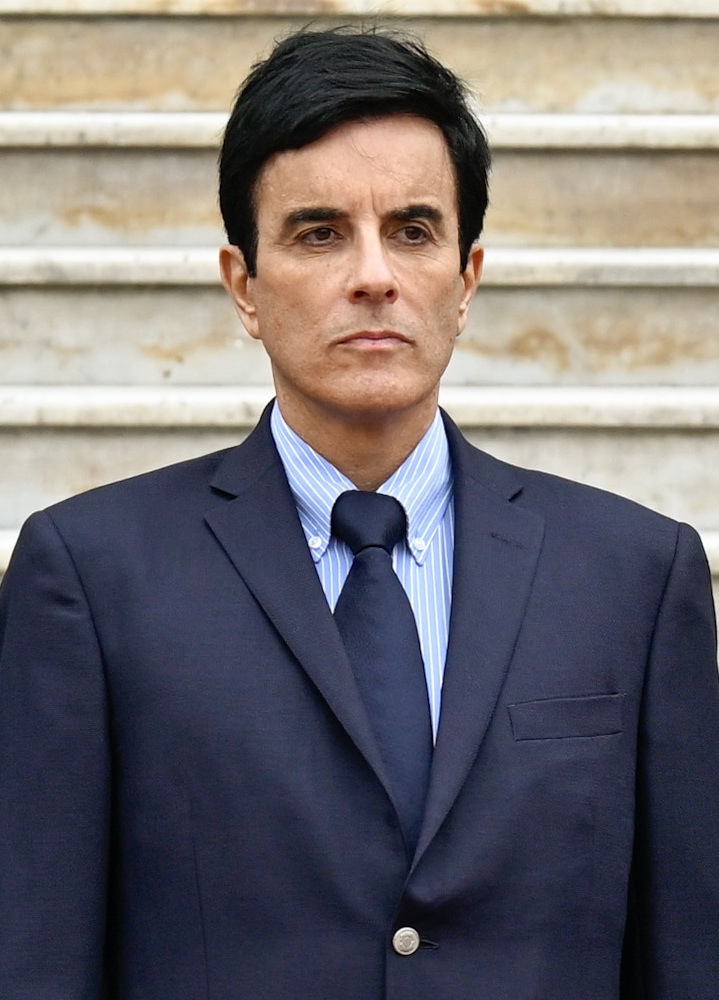
- Espá in 2026

Minister of Foreign Relations
- Incumbent
- Assumed office 28 July 2026
- President: Keiko Fujimori
- Prime Minister: Luis Galarreta
- Preceded by: Carlos Pareja Ríos

Personal details
- Born: Alfonso Carlos Espá y Garcés-Alvear; 1 September 1960 (age 66) Lima, Peru
- Party: SíCreo (since 2022)
- Children: 1
- Education: Pontifical Catholic University of Peru
- Occupation: Journalist
- Nickname: Muerto Fresco

Alfonso Carlos Espá y Garcés-Alvear (born 1 September 1960) is a Peruvian politician and journalist who currently serves as the Minister of Foreign Affairs since 2026. He is implicated in a corruption case.

== Biography ==
Espá completed his schooling at Markham College and subsequently attended the Pontifical Catholic University of Peru, where he qualified as a lawyer; he also earned a master's degree in political science from the American University in the United States as a Fulbright scholar.

Espá has worked as a journalist for the newspapers La Prensa and El Comercio, and for Radio Programas del Perú, Panamericana Televisión, América Televisión, and Voice of America.

Espá worked on the América Televisión program Cuarto Poder from 2002, until his resignation in 2004, following an incident involving the then-President of the Republic, Alejandro Toledo. During a phone call, the president called Espá a "coward" after a controversial report regarding the collection of signatures for his political party, Possible Peru. Toledo subsequently demanded a public apology from Carlos Espá and the program's director. The production team refused to comply with this demand, prompting Espá and América Televisión's news director to resign.

== Political career ==
=== Formation of SíCreo ===
The SíCreo Party is a right-wing and neoliberal Peruvian political party. It was founded on July 8, 2022. It achieved its electoral registration in March 2024, with its main leaders present: Carlos Espá as president, his brother Fernando Espá as vice president, the communicator Ignacio Franklin Arana Bullón, and the administrator Melitza Melania Yanzich Villagracia as general secretary. The party achieved its formal registration with the National Elections Board's Registry of Political Organizations (ROP), becoming the 26th political party with valid registration at that time. Its main headquarters are located in the Mirones Bajos Neighborhood Unit, Lima.

Carlos Espá justified the creation of the party as a response to the government and presidency of Pedro Castillo, citing concerns that Peru would "fall into the darkness of communism". During the 2026 Peruvian general elections, he announced his candidacy for president under the party's banner and ruled out the possibility of an electoral alliance with other political groups.

In December 2025, it was announced that then-congressmen Jorge Montoya Manrique and Javier Padilla, both from the right-wing conservative bloc Honor and Democracy, would run for reelection to the reinstated Senate in the 2026 general elections. Espá defended Montoya's candidacy against criticism from party members, arguing that his ideas bring "order, security, and unambiguous decisions." Several analysts have indicated that the party's position could be placed within neoliberalism, with conservative nuances on social issues and liberal ones on economic matters, as well as anti-statism although Espá considers himself against "labels" and prefers to be evaluated on his ideas. He presents as core values the defense of inherent human rights, including individual liberty, equality before the law, and due process. He proposes a model of the State based on administrative efficiency, institutional transparency, and the fight against corruption. In economic matters, the party declares its support for the free market and free trade as mechanisms to promote growth, modernization, and shared prosperity. It also proposes reforming the Peruvian state to make it more efficient and less bureaucratic, without proposing its elimination. It also supports the elimination of state monopolies, such as that of Sedapal, so that it can compete with private enterprise. Similarly, it supports the privatization of educational institutions and the implementation of educational vouchers, as well as "health for taxes" mechanisms, which would give families the option of choosing between public and private services. Furthermore, it recognizes traditional values such as the family, as well as fundamental rights such as the right to life, survival, and child development. Espá ran for the presidency in the 2026 Peruvian general elections but lost and was eliminated in the first round, to which he endorsed Keiko Fujimori in the run-off round.

On 28 July 2026, Espá was sworn in as Minister of Foreign Affairs within Keiko Fujimori's cabinet.
