= Rafael Belaúnde =

Peruvian politician (born 1974)

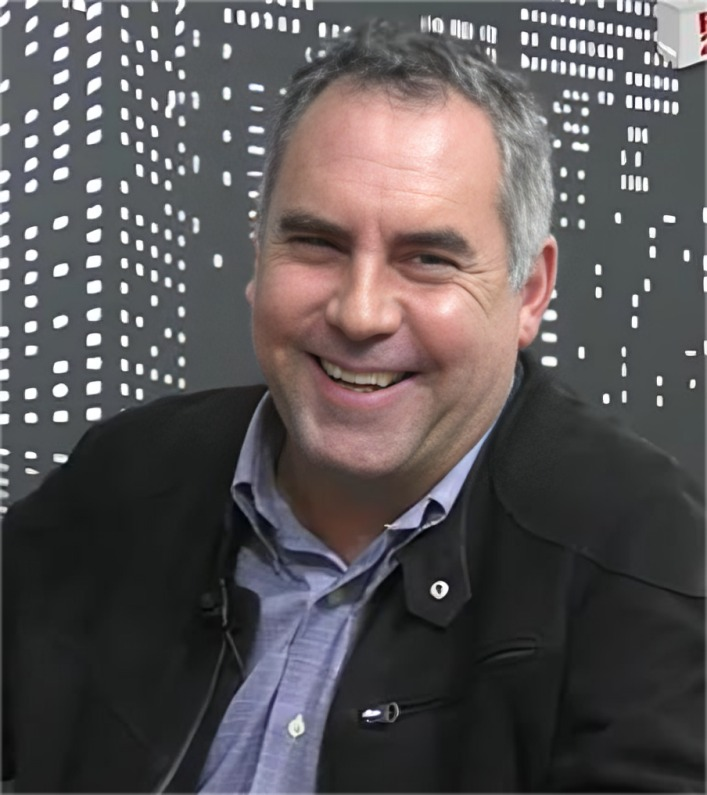
- Belaúnde in 2025

Minister of Defence
- Incumbent
- Assumed office 28 July 2026
- President: Keiko Fujimori
- Prime Minister: Luis Galarreta
- Preceded by: Amadeo Flores Carcagno

Minister of Energy and Mines
- In office 15 July 2020 – 6 August 2020
- President: Martín Vizcarra
- Prime Minister: Pedro Cateriano
- Preceded by: Susana Vilca
- Succeeded by: Luis Miguel Incháustegui

Personal details
- Born: Rafael Jorge Belaúnde Llosa; 26 December 1974 (age 51) Lima, Peru
- Party: People's Liberty (since 2022)
- Other political affiliations: Independent Moralizing Front (2001–2005); All for Peru (2020–2021); Popular Force (2021)
- Relatives: Fernando Belaúnde (grandfather)
- Education: University of Lima

Rafael Jorge Belaúnde Llosa (born 26 December 1974) is a Peruvian politician who is current serving as Minister of Defense since 28 July 2026 under President Keiko Fujimori. From July to August 2020, he served as Minister of Energy and Mines under Martín Vizcarra. He is the grandson of late former President Fernando Belaúnde.
