= National Jury of Elections =

Peruvian electoral body

JNE logo with its motto: Garantía de la voluntad popular (Guarantee of the people's will).

The National Jury of Elections (Spanish: Jurado Nacional de Elecciones, JNE) of is an autonomous constitutional organ, headquartered in Lima, which serves as Peru's electoral court. Its goal is to oversee the legality of electoral processes, guaranteeing the respect for the population's will. Thus, it is the entity in charge of proclaiming the official electoral results and awarding recognitions or credentials to the elected authorities. Furthermore, it passes resolutions to regulate the electoral dispositions.

Moreover, the Jury reviews appeals to resolutions passes in first instance by the Special Electoral Juries and has the last word on controversies regarding electoral matters. It also settles cases on vacancies declared by Regional and Municipal Councils.

Its five members are elected by different entities of the State. Its president is elected by the Supreme Court of Justice and the remaining four magistrates are appointed by the Public Ministry after being elected by the lawyers in Lima and the deans of the Law faculties, one from public universities and another from the private ones.

The Jury handles the Registry of Political Organizations, where the active political parties in Peru are registered.

== History ==
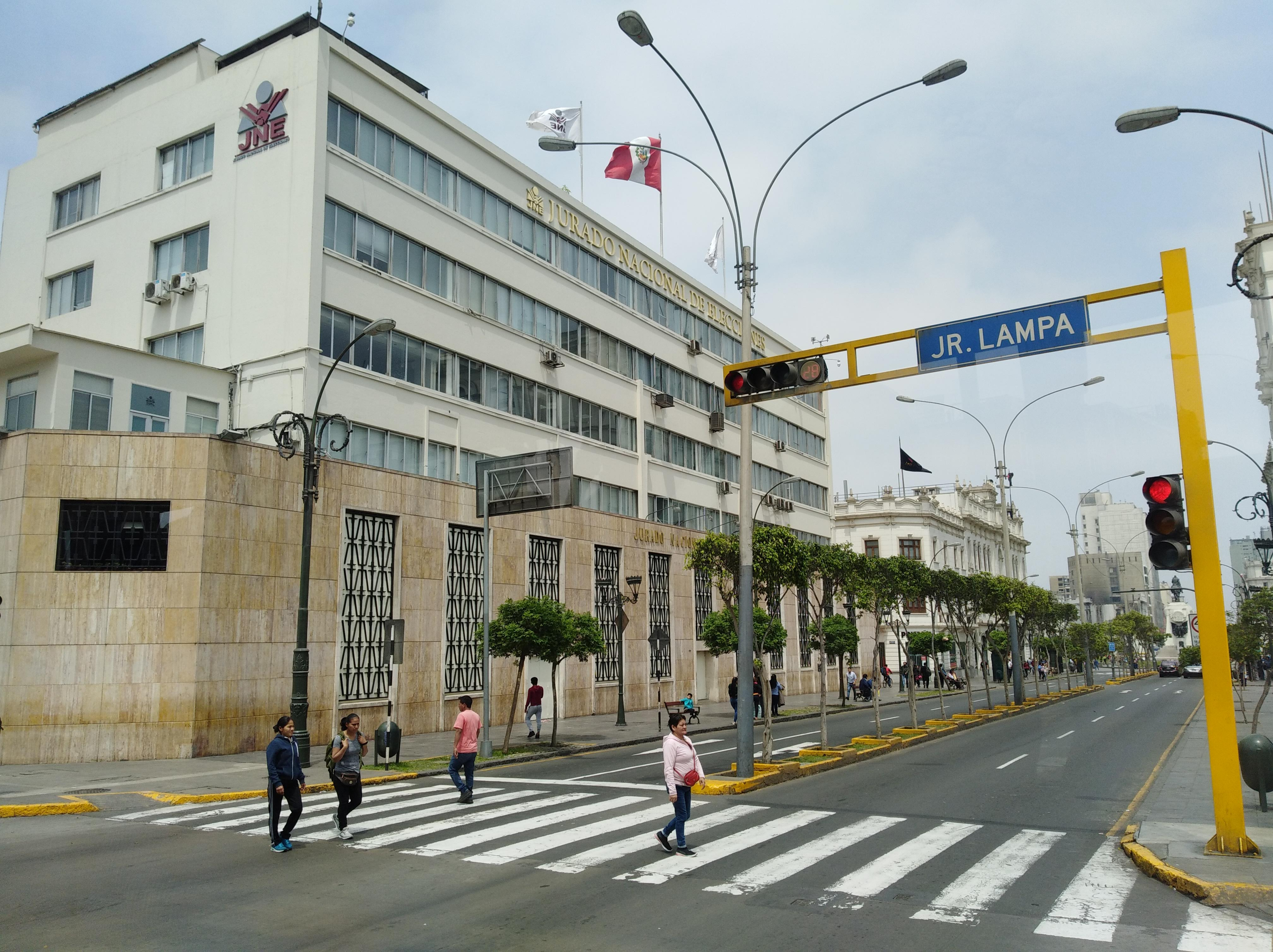
Headquarters in downtown Lima.

At the start of the Republican era there was no proper institution overseeing elections. Regulations pointed to the existence of boards or electoral colleges, and an electoral branch of power was even set up once. However, in practice, elections were run by either the Executive or the Legislative branch.

Nevertheless, several electoral laws were passed, such as the Regulation of Elections for Congress (1822), the Law of Municipal Elections (1824), the Regulations of Elections of 1839 and 1849, the Law of Elections of 1857 and 1861 and the Organic Law of Elections (1892).

The 20th century did not bring big changes to the electoral entities or for the election system. The country went through several electoral processes like before, without an impartial and independent electoral body, and with the electorate limited to tax-paying males.

Later, new legislation was passed, like the Law of Elections (1896), which for the first time created the National Electoral Board (Junta Electoral Nacional), made up of 9 members, and the Departmental Electoral Boards, as well as the Electoral Registry.

Other laws from these years were Law Number 861 of Political Elections (1908), Law Number 1072 of Municipal Elections (1909), Law Number 1533 of Political Elections (1912) and the Electoral Law (1912). The latter determined the Supreme Court's participation in the conduction of elections, such as those in 1913 and 1915.

In 1930, Commander Luis Miguel Sánchez Cerro established a military junta in Lima. But he was forced to resign from his post, permitting the installation of a National Government Board presided over by David Samanez Ocampo, who convoked general elections by Decree Law 7160, creating the National Jury of Elections as the maximum electoral authority.

The first plenary session of the Jury, set up on 22 September 1931, was presided over by Ernesto Araujo Alvarez and with the participation of members Max González Olaechea, Leandro Pareja, Ricardo Rivadeneyra, Ernesto Flores, Humberto Garrido Lecca and Nicanor Hurtado. The first Secretary-General was Eloy B. Espinoza.

The 1993 Constitution fragmented the Jury into three autonomous entities, separating the National Registry of Identification and Civil Status (Registro Nacional de Identificación y Estado Civil, RENIEC) and the National Office of Electoral Processes (Oficina Nacional de Procesos Electorales, ONPE) from it. RENIEC was made in charge of registering eligible voters, while ONPE was designed to organize the elections, leaving the Jury the duties of making any rulings concerning electoral processes, including the proclamation of official results.

Until 2005, the Jury oversaw 31 nationwide electoral processes, apart from complementary elections, plebiscites and revocations. 17 of these were political elections, resulting in the election of 12 constitutional presidents and as many national legislative bodies. Ten were municipal elections, two were constituent assembly elections, one was a referendum and one was for the election of regional governments.

== Functions ==
Currently the Jury has the following functions:

- To resolve in last instance the appeals and revisions of resolutions by the Special Electoral Juries.
- To declare the nullity of an electoral process, referendum or other popular consultation.
- To declare the vacancy of municipal or regional authorities.

== See also ==
- Museum of Elections and Democracy, hosted at the JNE headquarters
- Elections in Peru
- Politics of Peru
