= Democratic Bloc (Peru) =

Democratic Bloc Bloque Democrático
- Founded: 27 July 2021
- Dissolved: 26 July 2026
- Ideology: Conservatism (Peru); Authoritarianism; Centralism (Peru); Social conservatism Factions: Christian democracy Conservative liberalism Fujimorism; Conservative left Social liberalism
- Political position: Center-right to far-right (majority)
- Parties: Alliance for Progress; Free Peru (from 2023); Go on Country – Social Integration Party; Podemos Perú (until 2023); Popular Action; Popular Force; Popular Renewal (until 2024); We Are Peru
- Congress: 73 / 130

The Democratic Bloc (Spanish: Bloque Democrático), also called simply The Bloc (Spanish: El Bloque) or The Pact (Spanish: El Pacto), was the main Peruvian political coalition in the Peruvian Congress during the 2021-2026 parliamentary period and which has held the Presidency of Congress and the Board of Directors between 2021 and 2026. One of its members, José Jerí, held the presidency following the vacancy of Dina Boluarte until his censure in February 2026. This coalition is known derogatorily by its critics and political opponents as the "Corrupt Pact", the "Mafia Pact", the "Congressional Pact" or simply "the Pact".

It is composed of the parliamentary blocs of the parties Fuerza Popular, Avanza País, Perú Libre (from 2023), Acción Popular, Somos Perú and Alianza para el Progreso. Until 2023, Podemos Perú was part of this bloc. Renovación Popular, for its part, was part of it until 2024, when it separated from it. It originally emerged as an opposition bloc to the Presidency of Pedro Castillo, and remained as parliamentary support for the Presidency of Dina Boluarte. With the arrival of José María Balcázar, replacing José Jerí, the parties began to accuse each other of alleged secret pacts and internal betrayals.

Ideologically, it emerged led by right-wing political parties, although the participation of the conservative left-wing party Perú Libre modified this characteristic. It has been described as "conservative", "authoritarian", "centralist" and "anti–caviar mafia". Furthermore, it has been considered responsible for deciding which figures to protect or remove from political life, as well as for carrying out legislative and judicial reforms in the country. Among these reforms, sociologist Indira Huilca has highlighted the promotion of the so-called "Pro-Crime Law", the University Law and the rollback of women's rights.

== History ==
=== Government of Pedro Castillo (2021–2022) ===
The Democratic Front (BD) emerged in opposition to the government of Pedro Castillo in 2021, when Fuerza Popular (FP) issued a statement accusing him of being communist. The party had already conducted an anti-communist campaign during the presidential campaign of Keiko Fujimori in the 2021 Peruvian general election and continued to insist on presenting itself as the "democratic option," calling on "democratic forces to confront this threat to our homeland in a cohesive manner". Lourdes Flores Nano, a member of FP's legal team, stated that "what is interesting in the current moment is the emergence of this democratic front in defense of freedom and democracy, in which we must make the effort so that what happened to the Venezuelans does not happen to us". Hernando "Nano" Guerra García stated that Fuerza Popular had approved the proposal to create a bloc with a parliamentary agenda that would "defend democracy," "freedoms," the Fujimorist 1993 Constitution, and the free market economy.

The first Board of Directors (MD) of the Congress was elected through an agreement between right-wing and anti-communist political parties before Pedro Castillo took office. The list was originally called the "Coalition for Democratic Governance" and was presented by Avanza País. According to lawyer Hugo Amanque Chaiña, they presented a joint center-right list to prevent the left-wing candidates' list from controlling Parliament and from having a narrative in favor of the legacy of the 1993 Constitution. Fujimorist spokesperson, Luis Galarreta, confirmed that six parliamentary blocs agreed to run on a single list "in defense of democracy and freedoms". Finally, Norma Yarrow asserted that a faction of Renovación Popular, which had a separate list to run for the MD, supported the "democratic board".

In its first few months, the bloc developed the first impeachment montion against the then-president, although it failed to coordinate the votes. By 2022, the BD almost lost the MD elections because there was little coordination among its constituent blocs, mainly due to Popular Renewal. Alejandro Cavero (Avanza País) suggested that there was a split between "opposition" factions (determined to impeach) and "democrats" (flexible on impeachment), the latter including a faction of Acción Popular and Podemos Perú. However, for the third impeachment of Pedro Castillo against Castillo after the president's self-coup attempt, the BD showed greater unity. In an interview with the newspaper Expreso, Ángel Delgado, one of the promoters of Castillo's removal, pointed out that the Democratic Bloc had the opportunity to call elections in time, but the fact that it did not do so ended up discrediting and damaging the image of the coalition in the eyes of the public.

=== Government of Dina Boluarte (2022–2025) ===
The lawyer Rosa María Palacios has described this parliamentary period as a "de facto pact", in which the coalition prevented the Executive Branch—which she refers to as "an ally and a puppet"—and other institutions, such as the Public Ministry of Peru under Patricia Benavides, from investigating her. Journalist Gustavo Gorriti has noted that the coalition abandoned anti-communism and increasingly aligned itself with the political left, thanks to "the common interest in preserving their positions and, among other things, in being able to halt the anti-corruption investigations that affect them".

A PUCP study from June 2024 indicated that the parliamentary groups that achieved the greatest legislative success were Acción Popular, Alianza para el Progreso, Avanza País, Fuerza Popular, Renovación Popular and Somos Perú. Free Peru and Popular Force were the parties that interacted most with each other in Congress.

The Democratic Movements of José Williams (Avanza País), Alejandro Soto (APP) and Eduardo Salhuana (APP) aligned themselves with the government of Dina Boluarte. Throughout Boluarte's administration, until her removal from office on 10 October 2025, all the parliamentary groups of the Democratic Bloc (with the exception of the communist Perú Libre) rejected and shelved seven motions of impeachment filed against her. On occasion, the parliamentary groups also rejected investigating Patricia Benavides.

Even Lady Camones (APP), former president of the MD, supported Boluarte on the grounds of "governability". Between 2022 and 2025, a project was coordinated to allow Congress to establish its "trusted staff module" and hire multiple people autonomously (without the need for a public competition), without limit and without technical requirements. This project was developed in secret in agreement (no. 072–2022–2023) between the legislative presidencies of Williams and Salhuana.

In May 2023, members of Congress organized impeachment proceedings against the representatives of the National Board of Justice, the institution investigating Patricia Benavides. The JNJ, which represented the Judiciary of Peru, was one of the few autonomous institutions resistant to the influence of the Democratic Bloc. Diego García-Sayan described how, as an institution that appoints judges, "it was no coincidence that the corrupt Congress targeted the JNJ". Fernando Vivas noted that the bloc's discussion focused less on whether to remove the members and more on how to do so elegantly while maintaining the guarantees of the right to a defence. The impeachment proceedings did not achieve the expected success, and only one person was sanctioned for a few months toward the end of that year, although Congress had the option of appointing new members to the JNJ in 2025.

In June 2023, César Acuña confirmed his intention to relaunch a "center-right democratic bloc" for the MD in alliance with Fuerza Popular, Alianza para el Progreso, Renovación Popular, Avanza País, and Somos Perú. The following month, in July, the members of the BD presented a list for the MD elections with the tentative name "Bloque País" (Country Bloc). The list consisted of Alejandro Soto (APP) as President of the Congress of the Republic of Peru, Hernando Guerra (FP) as first vice president, Waldemar Cerrón (PL) as second vice president, and Roselli Amuruz of Avanza País as third vice president. The decision to integrate PL—now without Pedro Castillo or Dina Boluarte as members—into the BD came after PP's withdrawal from the bloc and the investigations into AP members belonging to "Los Niños" (The Children), Pedro Castillo's congressional faction involved in corruption cases. However, this decision led to the resignation of the Peru-Liberal congressmen Jaime Quito, Alex Flores, and Alfredo Pariona from their party. Alejandro Soto stated that he did not know how Cerrón Rojas had been added to the list.

Vladimir Cerrón, leader of PL, defended his party's inclusion in the BD instead of ceding it to "Los Niños" (The Children). Following criticism from other leftists, he published on X that "we must abandon the culture of a left born only to oppose; the left must prepare to govern. Participation in the MD is just as valid as participation in a Commission, in Parliament, or in the political party system, where all forms of representation exist." Cerrón explained that the congressmen who resigned from PL did so because they aspired to be candidates for the MD and that the decision to join the BD was made in a party vote, rejecting the option of joining a "caviar" formula. Américo Gonza, of PL, declared that PL's integration into the BD was not an alliance in itself but a multi-party pact through which the left wing of PL could have representation in the MD. For her part, Martha Moyano, of FP, declared that "I prefer this table as it is formed [with Perú Libre] to having a 'caviar' or a 'Niño' as president of Congress". Congresswoman Patricia Chirinos, then with Avanza País, also supported the Democratic Bloc's list and Roselli Amuruz as her party's representative on that list. In that sense, Eduardo Salhuana emphasized that the Democratic Bloc's caucuses supported Alejandro Soto because they considered him "a person who has conducted himself correctly".

In October 2023, the newspaper Correo reported that the bloc held 13 seats on the Subcommittee on Constitutional Accusations, compared to 12 for the "left". That same month, a police incident involving a party hosted by Roselli Amuruz had a detrimental effect on the image of the Democratic Bloc. According to Patricia Juárez and Rosangella Barbarán, Fujimorists confessed that they hoped Avanza País would convince Amuruz to resign, thus avoiding the dilemma of either saving or censuring her.

In July 2024, Popular Renewal withdrew from the bloc after not being included on the Board of Directors, following disagreements about the viability of Congresswoman Norma Yarrow, from that party, as its president. Yarrow confirmed the news and referred to the Democratic Bloc as "Dina Boluarte's candidate".

At that same juncture, in mid-2024, BD launched its re-election bid for the Board of Directors. Idelso García (APP) commented that there was "an interest in dividing APP and Fuerza Popular with the aim of taking over the Congress of the Republic". Congresswoman Silvana Robles questioned whether that coalition had "seized control" of the Board of Directors since 2021. Congresswoman Kelly Portalatino stated that the Magisterial Bloc of National Concertation was interested in joining the coalition. Ultimately, the list, headed by Eduardo Salhuana, emerged victorious. Patricia Juárez, elected vice president of the Board of Directors, acknowledged that the political coalition needed the votes of the left to win the election against its opponent, Luis Aragón Carreño.

In June 2025, negotiations began with other parliamentary groups outside the bloc to include them on the list for the Board of Directors elections, given that the previous year they had committed to incorporating representatives from other groups to lead the Board. Subsequently, members of the bloc stated that they had decided to run separately.

In the July 2025 elections, José Cueto (Popular Renewal) announced that he would participate on a list headed by Popular Renewal, which ran against the dominant political coalition. Cueto had previously tried, unsuccessfully, to create his own "democratic bloc" with Fujimorists because he believed they could "exercise real political control over this government". Lady Camones confirmed that Cueto would not receive BD's votes. Instead, Popular Force, Peru Libre, We Are Peru, and Alliance for Progress presented a list headed by José Jerí and including Fernando Rospigliosi and Waldemar Cerrón as the "Democratic Bloc". This latter list was victorious. It was learned that none of the coalition's stronger parties were interested in placing their representatives at the top of the list. Following Boluarte's impeachment in October 2025, José Jerí would become President of Peru and Rospigliosi would be in charge of the Presidency of Congress.

=== Governments of José Jerí and José María Balcázar (2025–2026) ===
Researcher and PhD in Social and Political Sciences Roger Merino described José Jerí as the embodiment of the "pact" that has been governing "with an iron fist." In comparison to Boluarte, he stated that his government was an imitation of the previous one, but now "totally transparent" to public opinion. He clarified that the Parliament's intention with this government was "to continue expanding this power into all public institutions" and to counteract citizen mobilizations.

In February 2026, during the vote on the motion of censure against President Jerí, Fuerza Popular was the only political party that explicitly defended the continuation of Jerí's government. One of its members, Patricia Juárez, stated that his removal would constitute a "parliamentary coup" by their competitors. For its part, Renovación Popular voted in favor of the motion and publicly asked Fuerza Popular to "take responsibility for their votes, since they had created Fujijerismo". Perú Libre has not adopted a clear position, as Vladimir Cerrón has not explicitly expressed his opinion on the censure of José Jerí on his social media.

Following Jerí's removal, the bloc did not present a united front in the election for the new Speaker of Congress and President of the Republic. The conservative right-wing parties Popular Renewal and Popular Force, and the Popular Action caucus, announced their support for María del Carmen Alva (of Popular Action). Meanwhile, the leftist Peru Libre party nominated its member José María Balcázar, a candidacy that was supported by the populist right-wing parties Alianza para el Progreso and Podemos Perú. Balcázar won with 60 votes to 46, resulting in cross-accusations among the conservative right-wing caucuses of having secretly voted for the leftist candidate. María del Carmen Alva acknowledged that no left-wing parliamentarian would support her and that Balcázar was better received among both right-wing and left-wing congressmen, and therefore generated less friction for the continuity of political power.

Days later, José María Balcázar preliminarily chose Hernando de Soto as prime minister, a decision supported by members of Congress from Fuerza Popular and Renovación Popular. A few hours passed before it was discovered that Balcázar had formed a cabinet without De Soto, who denounced the considerable influence of APP leader, César Acuña. Denisse Miralles assumed the presidency of the Council of Ministers, generating divided reactions within the coalition regarding whether or not to grant her a vote of confidence. Miralles remained in office for less than a month, and Confiep blamed the parliamentary groups for her departure and the resulting "political instability".

In April 2026, all former presidents of Congress from the Democratic Bloc (Maricarmen Alva, Lady Camones, José Williams, Alejandro Soto, Eduardo Salhuana and José Jerí) issued a statement supporting the acting president of Congress, Fernando Rospigliosi, also a member of the Bloc, in the face of the defamation lawsuit filed against Rospigliosi by the dismissed former Attorney General Delia Espinoza.

The conservative-leaning press has attempted to interpret the impact of the bloc by replacing Jerí with Balcázar. The newspaper Correo, known for its opposition to Pedro Castillo, criticized the "caucuses of the formerly named 'democratic bloc'" in its editorial for "having lent themselves to the infamous" election of Balcázar. Similarly, El Comercio columnist Iván Arenas has suggested that the coalition will be remembered as the "mafia pact" or the "corrupt pact" rather than for the anecdotes involving its congressmen. Arenas justified this as a "narrative" intended to misrepresent the term "pact" and stated that "extreme ideology in Peru has led us to consider that every pact or agreement is always a shift, a betrayal of principles, or simply a power grab". The columnist for the same newspaper, José Carlos Requena, pointed out that congressmen like Valentín Paniagua and Francisco Sagasti were able to cope with parliamentary pressure groups, while Balcázar's "umbilical dependence on the congressional coalition seems consistent".

=== 2026 general election ===
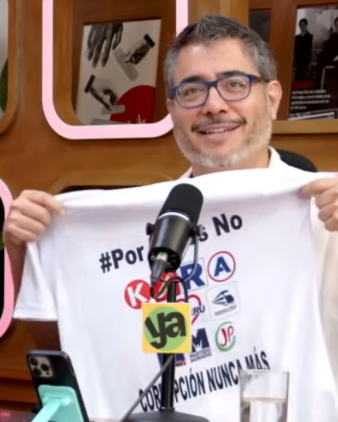
Journalist Marco Sifuentes displaying the political slogan #PorEstosNo during an interview with candidate Charlie Carrasco.

For the 2026 Peruvian general election, each of the parties and members of parliament of the so-called Democratic Bloc are participating independently with their own party lists. The CongreZoo website reported that at least 30 candidates are guaranteed re-election to the bicameral Congress.

According to Juan Carlos Ruiz Rivas of the consulting firm ATIK, Fujimorism has consolidated its "hardcore vote" against a possible "anti-system vote" (i.e., against the parliamentary coalition). Keiko Fujimori (leader of FP) has denied participating in the "mafia pact" and has preferred to blame other politicians for the institutional crisis simply because she is not officially a head of state. Instead, she proposed forming an electoral alliance that would share "the economic chapter", and include the collaboration of Rafael López Aliaga (leader of Popular Renewal), arguing that "the enemies are over there" and that "the majority of Peruvians [sic] want you and me to go to a second round." However, López Aliaga refused.

Meanwhile, several former ministers of Dina Boluarte participated as candidates or technical advisors for the parties that form or have formed part of the Democratic Bloc: José Arista as a candidate for Fuerza Popular; Juan José Santiváñez, César Vásquez Sánchez and César Sandoval as candidates for Alianza para el Progreso; José Salardi as head of the government plan for Alianza para el Progreso; and Alex Contreras as head of the economic plan for Renovación Popular. This behaviour differs from that of the officials and associates of Pedro Castillo, who frequently turned to Juntos por el Perú, as did its presidential candidate and former minister Roberto Sánchez. Juntos por el Perú presented itself as a left-wing party that distanced itself from the Democratic Bloc to show support for the imprisoned former president. Sánchez was nearly sanctioned in political life, but Fujimorism refused due to a possible fear that he would be replaced by his alternate, Gahela Cari.

Outside the coalition, a possible link was revealed between Morgan Quero also a former minister under Boluarte (currently a member of Citizens for Peru), and the recently founded the Party of Good Government, que era fundado recientemente. Leader Jorge Nieto himself denied this, stating that he had severed all ties of friendship and forced a former official to withdraw her congressional candidacy with the aforementioned party. He also admitted that Dina Boluarte had summoned him for advice, although he clarified that his intention was for Boluarte to take responsibility for the deaths during the protests. Later, in the presidential debate, Jorge Nieto and Mesías Guevara asserted that there was a "mafia pact" or a "coalition" between the two powers currently governing the country.

For their part, the political opponents of this coalition promoted a protest vote campaign against all the parties that comprised it, which was even disseminated during the presidential debate. The parties used the slogan "Not for These People," which lawyer Rosa María Palacios adopted in a 2024 column and which was often written as the hashtag #PorEstosNo. Fernando Tuesta noted that the initiative was mainly promoted by the Purple Party, which managed to enter Congress, but whose caucus eventually disappeared. Tuesta acknowledged that the party carried out the campaign when it was not well received by the population. Rudecindo Vega, campaign manager for the Primero la Gente party and promoter of the anti-vote campaign, stated that the Bloc had intervened in the electoral system, such as the elimination mechanism of the primary elections and the appointment of electoral authorities, resulting in an "electoral fragmentation" of other parties in favour of the coalition. Marisol Pérez Tello, of Primero la Gente, admitted that a consensus-based party grouping had been planned to centralize the anti-vote and defeat the parties of the parliamentary coalition, but it could not be carried out.

The campaign was supported by public figures (such as Salvador del Solar), entrepreneurs, and activists. The slogan was displayed as a sticker and used as a rallying cry at demonstrations in Lima, where they were met with police oppression. The Association of Relatives of the Deceased and Injured, representing the victims of the protests against the government of Dina Boluarte, has even encouraged people not to vote for the coalition parties, arguing that no member of Congress or political representative reached out to the affected families or expressed institutional support during the three years of protests, including the sporadic ones. Fernando Rospigliosi, president of the coalition's parliamentary committee, has criticized the anti-vote campaign and the National Jury of Elections campaign urging citizens not to vote out of habit or for the most popular candidates.

Finally, after election day, the Lima Gris website stated that, of the eight parties that effectively formed the coalition, only Fuerza Popular and Renovación Popular remained above the electoral threshold (with 52% of the ballots processed). Juntos por el Perú would also have obtained seats in Congress.

== Electoral history ==
Session	Date	Post	Candidacy	Votes	Results
Annual Session 2021-2022	July 26, 2021	Congressional Board	President: María del Carmen Alva; 1st Vice Presidency: Lady Camones; 2nd Vice Presidency: Enrique Wong; 3rd Vice Presidency: Patty Chirinos	69/130	Elect
Annual Session 2022-2023	July 26, 2022	Congressional Board	President: Lady Camones; 1st Vice Presidency: Martha Moyano; 2nd Vice Presidency: Digna Calle; 3rd Vice Presidency: Wilmar Elera	73/130	Elect
Annual Session 2022-2023	August 11, 2022	Third Vice Presidency of the Board of Directors	Alejandro Muñante	55/130	Elect
Annual Session 2022-2023	September 12, 2022	Presidente del Congreso de la República del Perú	José Williams	67/130	Elect
Annual Session 2022-2023	February 10, 2023	Second Vice Presidency of the Board of Directors	Silvia Monteza	67/130	Elect
Annual Session 2023-2024	July 26, 2023	Congressional Board	Presidencia: Alejandro Soto; 1st Vice Presidency: Nano Guerra; 2nd Vice Presidency: Waldemar Cerrón; 3rd Vice Presidency: Rosselli Amuruz	77/130	Elect
Annual Session 2023-2024	October 5, 2023	First Vice Presidency of the Board of Directors	Arturo Alegría	89/130	Elect
Annual Session 2024-2025	July 26, 2024	Congressional Board	Presidencia: Eduardo Salhuana; 1st Vice Presidency: Patricia Juárez; 2nd Vice Presidency: Waldemar Cerrón; 3rd Vice Presidency: Alejandro Cavero	95/130	Elect
Annual Session 2025-2026	July 26, 2025	Congressional Board	Presidencia: José Jerí; 1st Vice Presidency: Fernando Rospigliosi; 2nd Vice Presidency: Waldemar Cerrón; 3rd Vice Presidency: Ílich López	79/130	Elect
Annual Session 2025-2026	February 18, 2025	President of the Congress of the Republic of Peru and the President of Peru	[They participated separately]		

== See also ==
- Conservatism in Peru (21st century)
- Competency process regarding the vote of confidence raised on November 17, 2022
- Constitutional complaints filed against Dina Boluarte
- Members of the Congress of the Republic of Peru (2021–2026)
- Fujimorist propaganda

== Bibliography ==
- De Althaus, Jaime (2022-04-30). "Unidad" (in Spanish). El Comercio. ISSN 1605-3052.
- Vivas, Fernando (2023-09-04). "Te invito a 'El Bloque'. Crónica de Fernando Vivas sobre la ilusión de centro derecha para el 2026" (in Spanish). El Comercio. ISSN 1605-3052.
- De Jesús, Meloddy; Velásquez, Saldarriaga (2025-04-03). "La derecha peruana en la estrategia internacional del partido español VOX (Iberosfera) en América Latina (2019–2023)". Pontificia Universidad Católica del Perú. Tesis de licenciatura en Ciencia Política. Lima: Pontificia Universidad Católica del Perú.
- Tanaka, Martín (2024). "Perú en 2023: de la polarización a la coalición conservadora y populista durante el gobierno de Dina Boluarte". Revista de ciencia política (Santiago) (ahead). doi:10.4067/s0718-090x2024005000123. ISSN 0718-090X.
- IDL-Reporteros (2026-04-11). "Así el pacto capturó el país". IDL-Reporteros (in Spanish).
- IDL-Reporteros (2024-06-22). "Los conflictos de interés del pacto corrupto". IDL-Reporteros (in Spanish).
- Palacios, Rosa María (2024-08-11). "Las cuatro familias". La República (Perú) (in Spanish).
- Cárdenas, Abel (2025-07-27). "Boluarte y el Congreso: El último año de un pacto político sin legitimidad". Ojo Público (in Spanish).
- Aragón, Jorge; Cruz, Marylia; Alcántara, Karina; Sánchez, Paolo (2024). Poder congresal en el Perú: un balance a la mitad del periodo 2021-2026 (PDF). Lima: Pontificia Universidad Católica del Perú, Escuela de Gobierno. ISBN 978-612-47713-1-6.
- Costa Santolalla, Gino (2025-06-30). "Derrotar al Pacto: Llamada urgente al centro político". Acta Herediana. 68 (1): 55–58. doi:10.20453/ah.v68i1.6661. ISSN 2411-4502.
- Vivas, Fernando (2025). "El otorongo y los caviares". In Omar Rincón; Daiana Bruzzone; Luisa Uribe (ed.). Los yo narrativos [Relatos de poder en LATAM-CARIBE] (PDF). CLACSO; Fundación Friedrich Ebert. pp. 175–184. ISBN 978-958-8677-95-8.
- Cross, Ronald (25 February 2023). "La cosmovisión conservadora en el Congreso". La Encerrona (in Spanish).
- Coronel, Omar (2024-02-08). "La coalición autoritaria que gobierna Perú". Nueva Sociedad | Democracia y política en América Latina.
- Zambrano, Américo (2026-02-15). "El Pacto se quita la máscara". La política del escorpión. Aguilar. ISBN 9786124247989.
- Aragón Trelles, Jorge; Cruz Sarmiento, Marylía; Alcántara Hidalgo, Karina; Sánchez Guerra, Paolo (2024). Poder congresal en el Perú: un balance a la mitad del periodo 2021-2026 (PDF). Fondo Editorial de la Pontificia Universidad Católica del Perú. ISBN 978-612-47713-1-6.
