= José Williams =

Retired Peruvian Army general

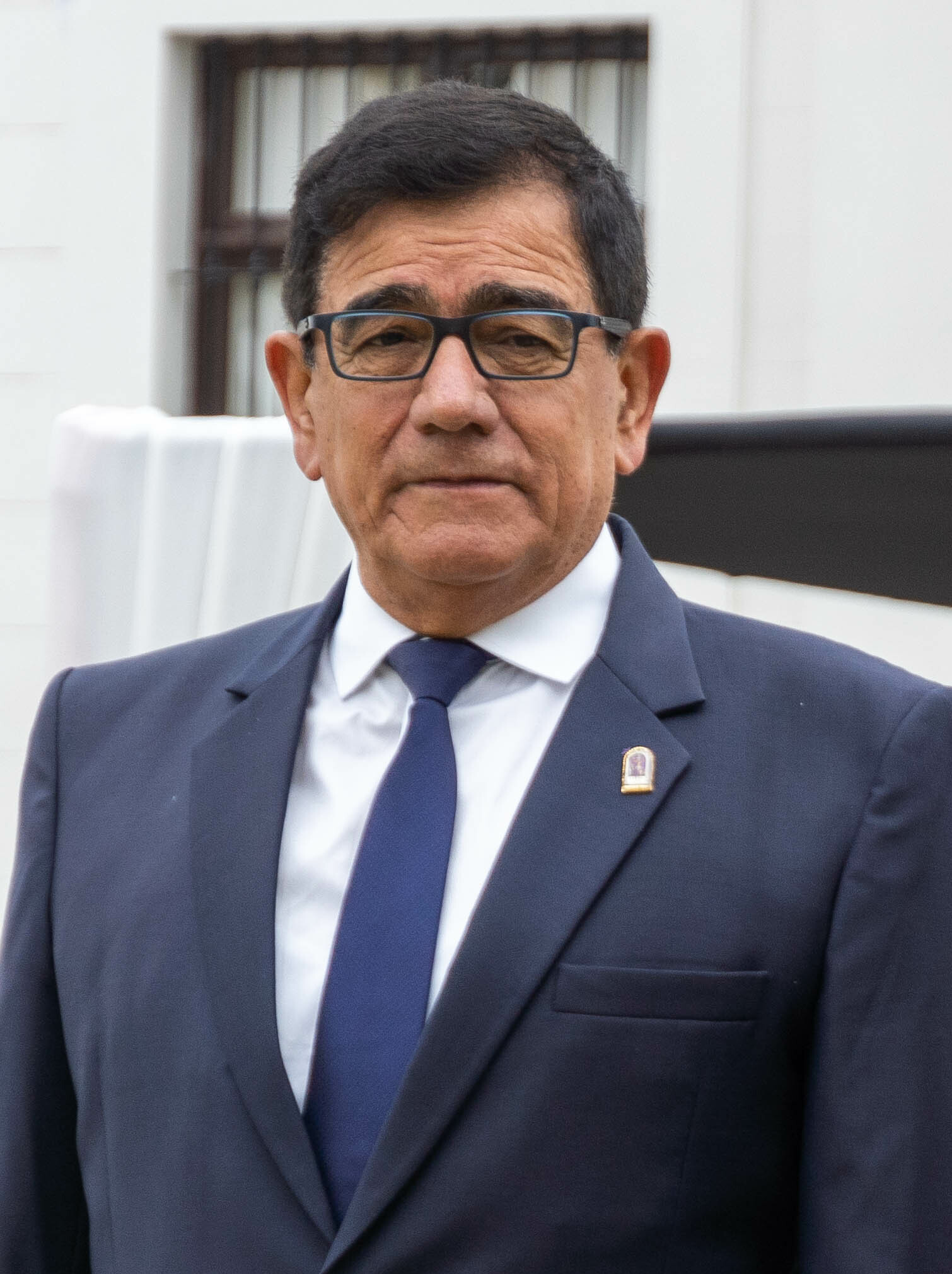
- Williams in 2022

President of Congress
- In office 12 September 2022 – 26 July 2023
- Vice President: 1st Vice President; Martha Moyano; 2nd Vice President; Digna Calle; Silvia Monteza; 3rd Vice President; Alejandro Muñante
- Preceded by: Martha Moyano (a.i.)
- Succeeded by: Alejandro Soto Reyes
Congress committee offices
Chair of the Congressional Defense Committee
In office 18 August 2021 – 20 September 2022
President	Maricarmen Alva; Lady Camones; Martha Moyano (a.i.); Himself
Deputy	Jeny Luz
Preceded by	Daniel Urresti
Succeeded by	Diego Bazán

Member of Congress
- In office 27 July 2021 – 24 July 2026
- Constituency: Lima

Chief of the Joint Command of the Armed Forces of Peru
- In office 5 December 2005 – 4 December 2006
- President: Alejandro Toledo; Alan García
- Preceded by: Frank Boyle Alvarado
- Succeeded by: Jorge Montoya

Personal details
- Born: José Daniel Williams Zapata; 9 November 1951 (age 74) Lima, Peru
- Party: Go on Country - Social Integration Party (2020-present)
- Other political affiliations: Independent (before 2020)
- Education: Chorrillos Military School (BS); Center for Higher National Studies (MA)

Military service
- Allegiance: Peru
- Branch/service: Peruvian Army
- Years of service: 1971–2006
- Rank: Major general
- Battles/wars: Internal conflict in Peru; Cenepa War; Operation Chavín de Huántar; Andahuaylazo

José Daniel Williams Zapata (born 9 November 1951) is a politician and retired Peruvian Army general who served as President of the Congress of Peru, the head of the legislature. Williams currently represents the constituency of Lima in the Peruvian Congress as a member of Go on Country - Social Integration Party.

In 1997, Williams led Operation Chavín de Huántar, a military operation that successfully ended the Japanese embassy hostage crisis. He served as Chief of the Joint Command of the Armed Forces of Peru from 2005 to 2006.

== Military career ==
Williams was born in Lima on November 9, 1951. He enrolled in the Peruvian Army through the Chorrillos Military School.

=== Accomarca massacre ===
In 1985, then Colonel Williams was allegedly involved in the Accomarca massacre in Ayacucho, reportedly leading two of four patrols that participated in the "Huancayoc Plan" that resulted in the massacre. Two judicial events in 2005 did not find sufficient evidence to convict Williams of any crime, though details of the meeting introducing the Huancayoc Plan were not revealed until 2012 when second lieutenant Telmo Hurtado was questioned. According to Hurtado, who served under Williams, the colonel gave orders "not to give written account of terrorist casualties in any military operation, but verbally" in an attempt to "avoid complaints from the relatives of the victims". According to attorney Carlos Rivera Paz of the IDL, this does not show Williams' involvement in the massacre but instead shows an attempt of a coverup. Williams denied giving such orders and that since casualty numbers were ultimately reported and observed during trials investigating the massacre.

=== Chavín de Huántar Operation ===
Williams led the Operation Chavín de Huántar in April 1997. He was hailed a national hero for the rescue of the remaining 72 captive hostages of the Túpac Amaru Revolutionary Movement, effectively ending the Japanese embassy hostage crisis. This mission was a success and is considered one of the most successful rescue operations in history. According to hostages rescued from the embassy, at least one guerilla fighter was arrested and was later found to be shot in the head, raising concerns of an extrajudicial execution.

=== Piura leadership ===
In 2004, Williams served as the head of the Northern Military Region of Piura. According to Wayka, Williams allegedly collaborated with the Tijuana Cartel at the time, with leaked diplomatic cables linking Williams to Captain Jonathan Huacac, who was accused of trafficking 700 kilograms of cocaine for the cartel. Diario La Primera reported that Huacac would host late-night parties with mariachis for prominent Mexican drug lords at the Piura Military Casino, with all of this occurring only 100 metres (330 ft) away from the home of Williams. Captain Hilario Rosales Sánchez of the Peruvian National Police reported that photographs existed linking Williams and Huacac, though no actions were taken after concerns were sent to Lima, according to Rosales.

=== Other roles ===
Attaining the rank of major-general, Williams was appointed Chief of the Joint Command of the Armed Forces of Peru, serving in the position from 2005 to 2006. He retired from the Army in December 2006.

From 2009 and 2011, Williams served as was Academic Director of the Center for Higher National Studies (CAEN), from which he obtained a master's degree in defense studies. He also serves as professor at the San Ignacio de Loyola University since 2018, and is a Lecturer at the Higher School of War since 2020.

== Political career ==
=== 2021 congressional election ===
In 2020, Williams was announced as part of Go on Country - Social Integration Party's congressional list for the 2021 general election. In addition, he participated in Hernando de Soto's presidential campaign as the technical team's defense and security advisor. During the presidential campaign, de Soto publicly announced a Shadow Cabinet, in which he included Williams as Shadow Defense Minister. Although de Soto was not elected to the presidency, Williams was elected to a seat in the Peruvian Congress. He is currently the party's parliamentary spokesperson, appointed by de Soto. Upon assuming his congressional seat, Williams was selected on 18 August 2021 as chair of the Congressional Defense Committee.

During his tenure, Williams signed the Madrid Charter, joining an international alliance of right-wing and far-right groups organized by Spanish party Vox.

=== President of the Peruvian Congress ===
On 12 September 2022, Williams became leader of the legislature as the President of Congress after the impeachment and removal of President of Congress Lady Camones over audio recordings of alleged corruption.

On 7 December 2022, President of Congress José Williams led the congress in impeaching and removing President of Peru Pedro Castillo after Castillo attempted to dissolve congress, form an emergency government, and call for a constituent assembly to draft a new constitution. First Vice President Dina Boluarte became the President of Peru. Because Boluarte had no First Vice President or Second Vice President, José Williams became first in the line of succession after President Boluarte.

== Public opinion ==
The Institute of Peruvian Studies (IEP) collected opinion polls regarding Williams; in November 2022, 68% of respondents disapproved of Williams, with the disapproval rate increasing to 72% in January 2023.
