= Norma Yarrow =

Peruvian businesswoman and politician

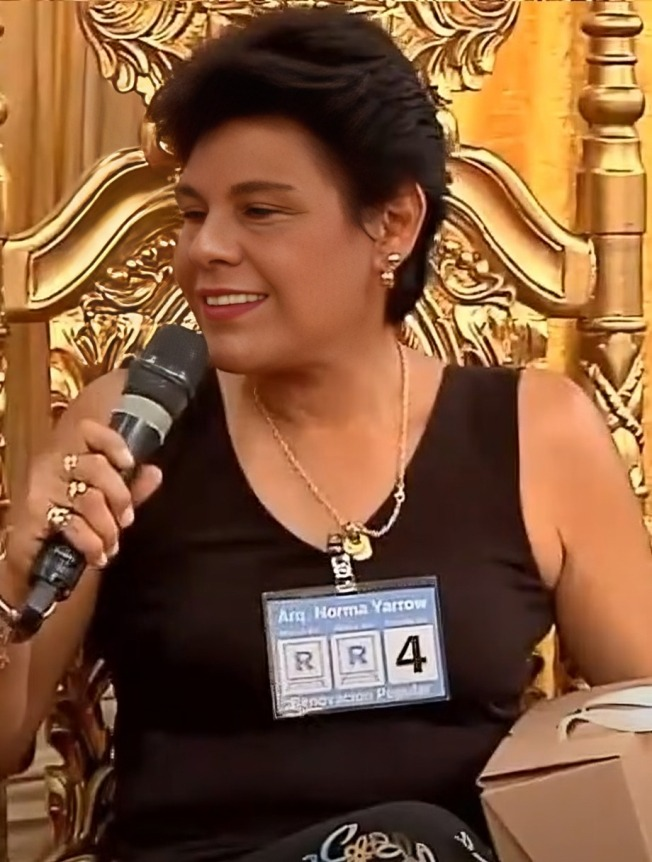
- Yarrow in 2021

Member of the Chamber of Deputies
- Incumbent
- Assumed Office; 24 July 2026
- Constituency: Lima Metropolitan

Member of Congress
- In office 27 July 2021 – 24 July 2026
- Constituency: Lima Metropolitan

Personal details
- Born: Norma Martina Yarrow Lumbreras; July 29, 1963 (age 63) Chiclayo District, Peru
- Party: Popular Renewal
- Education: Women's University of the Sacred Heart

Norma Martina Yarrow Lumbreras (born July 29, 1963) is a Peruvian architect, businesswoman, and politician. She served as a member of Congress of the Republic of Peru for the 2021-2026 term, and she is currently as a member of the Chamber of Deputies representing Metropolitan Lima for the 2026-2031 term. She was a candidate for Vice President of Peru in the 2026 Peruvian general election, as the running mate of Rafael López Aliaga.

== Biography ==
Yarrow was born in the district of Chiclayo, located in Lambayeque, on July 29, 1963. She completed his primary and secondary studies at the Santa Ángela School in Chiclayo.

She studied Architecture at the Women's University of the Sacred Heart, where she obtained her professional degree in 1997.

== Political career ==
She was a member of the National Solidarity party, where she was the national secretary of organization from 2002 to 2011.

She was a candidate for Congress for the National Solidarity Alliance in the 2011 Peruvian general election. Although the alliance had representation in Congress, Yarrow was not elected.

=== Councilor of Lima ===
In the 2002 municipal elections, she was elected councilor of the Metropolitan Municipality of Lima, by the National Unity Electoral Alliance (an alliance that included National Solidarity), for the municipal period 2003-2006. She was re-elected in the 2006 elections for the period 2007-2010.

For the 2018 Lima municipal election, she was again elected councilor of the Municipality of Lima for Perú Patria Segura, where she was also running as deputy mayor under Renzo Reggiardo.

=== Congress ===
For the 2021 Peruvian general election, Yarrow announced her candidacy for Congress with the Popular Renewal party, whose presidential candidate was Rafael López-Aliaga. Yarrow and López-Aliaga had previously been close friends, as both had come from the National Solidarity party .

In the elections, she was elected congresswoman of the republic for the parliamentary period 2021-2026.

For the second round, she announced her integration into the technical team of Fuerza Popular, whose presidential candidate was Keiko Fujimori.

Yarrow served as a congresswoman for Popular Renewal, a party that had joined the Democratic Bloc coalition. According to the newspaper Perú 21, she had negotiated for her party to nominate her for the presidency of the Board of Directors. However, along with two other congressmen from the group, she resigned due to "acts of harassment" by Congressman Jorge Montoya Manrique. They then decided to join the Avanza País caucus.
