= Paul García =

Peruvian lawyer, businessman and politician

Paul García Oviedo

Member of Congress
- In office 16 March 2020 – 26 July 2021
- Constituency: Callao

Personal details
- Born: Paul Gabriel García Oviedo; 2 October 1990 (age 35) Lima, Peru
- Party: Popular Action
- Spouse: Rosselli Amuruz (m. 2024)
- Education: Pontifical Catholic University of Peru; Rey Juan Carlos University; National University of Callao
- Occupation: Lawyer, businessman, marketer, politician
- Website: paulgarciaoviedo.com

Paul Gabriel García Oviedo (born 2 October 1990) is a Peruvian lawyer, businessman and politician. He was a Congressman, representing Callao from 16 March 2020 to 26 July 2021.

== Early life and education ==
García was born on 2 October 1990. He completed his primary and secondary studies in the city of Lima and in 2012 studied technical marketing at the Zegel IPAE school. He began law studies at the Pontificia Universidad Católica del Perú, obtaining a bachelor's degree in law and the professional title of lawyer.

From 2014 he was a student leader at the Pontificia Universidad Católica del Perú, arriving at the Federated Center of Law and the University Assembly of the PUCP.

He later obtained a master's degree in Political Science and Public Management from Rey Juan Carlos University in Spain, and a master's degree in Strategic Business Administration from the National University of Callao, registered with the National Registry of Academic Degrees and Professional Titles of SUNEDU. He is currently pursuing a doctorate in Public Policy and State Management at the Centro de Altos Estudios Nacionales (CAEN). He is admitted to practice law with the Lima Bar Association (Ilustre Colegio de Abogados de Lima, CAL), registration No. 97956.

== Career ==
García is affiliated with the Popular Action party. He was also a candidate for the Callao provincial mayor's office during the 2018 municipal elections. He also served as National Executive Director of the Association of Municipalities of Peru (AMPE).

During the extraordinary elections of 2020, he was elected a congressman of the republic on behalf of the Constitutional Province of Callao. García was in favor of the removal of President Martín Vizcarra during the two processes that took place for it, the second of which ended up removing the former president from power. The congressman supported the motion, being one of the 105 parliamentarians who voted in favor of the removal of President Martín Vizcarra.

He is the founding managing partner ("socio director") of the law firm García Oviedo Abogados y Consultores.

== Controversies ==
In October 2023, a party held in his honor, attended by his partner, congresswoman Rosselli Amuruz, ended in a shooting and one fatality.
