= Alejandro Cavero =

Peruvian politician

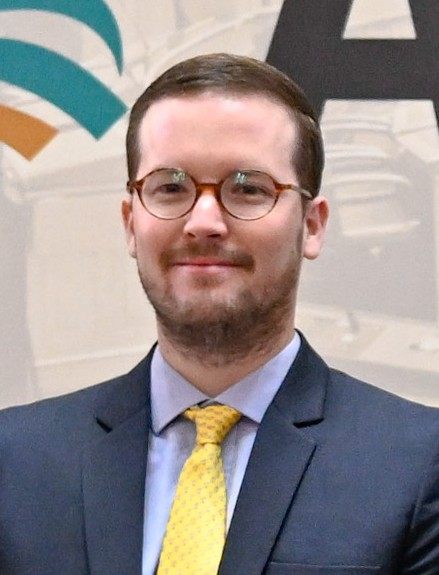

Third Vice President of the Congress of the Republic of Peru
- In office 26 July 2024 – 26 July 2025
- President: Eduardo Salhuana
- Preceded by: Rosselli Amuruz
- Succeeded by: Ilich López

Member of the Congress of the Republic of Peru
- In office 27 July 2021 – 24 July 2026
- Constituency: Lima

Personal details
- Born: Alejandro Enrique Cavero Alva; 6 June 1992 (age 34) Lima, Peru
- Party: Go on Country – Social Integration Party
- Education: Pontifical Catholic University of Peru (LLB)

Alejandro Enrique Cavero Alva (born 6 June 1992) is a Peruvian politician who has been a member of the Congress of the Republic of Peru as a member of the Go on Country – Social Integration Party since 2021.

== Early life and education ==
Alejandro Enrique Cavero Alva was born in Lima, Peru, on 6 June 1992. He graduated from Pontifical Catholic University of Peru as a lawyer.

== Career ==
During the 2011 election Cavero worked on Pedro Pablo Kuczynski's youth campaign. He was a journalist that covered politics for El Comercio.

In the 2021 election Cavero won a seat in the Congress of the Republic of Peru from the Lima province as a member of the Go on Country – Social Integration Party. He was selected to serve as Third Vice President.

== Personal life ==
Cavero is a homosexual. On 1 December 2024, he was assaulted at the Lima Art Museum after taking a phone away from an attendee that was harassing him.

== Political positions ==
Cavero is opposed to compulsory voting stating that it increases the amount of uninformed voters. In response to prison overcrowding in most of Peru's prisons, Cavero proposed privatising prisons.

Cavero stated that he is right-wing. He supports the far-right Spanish political party Vox. He called for Peru to recognise Edmundo González as president-elect of Venezuela after the 2024 presidential election.

Cavero supports equality for LGBTQ people on both moral and economic perspectives. In 2022, he proposed legislation to recognise civil unions, but placed limitations on same-sex adoption except in the case in which one of the partners has a child that does not have another parent.

== Electoral history ==
Election	Office	List	#	District	Votes			Result	Ref.
Election	Office	List	#	District	Total	%	P.	Result	Ref.
2021	Member of Congress	Go on Country – Social Integration Party	14	Lima Metropolitan Area	30,242	10.79%	3rd (Note: Presented on an electoral list. The data shown represents the share of the vote the entire party/alliance received in that constituency.)	Elected	

== Works cited ==
=== News ===
- "Alejandro Cavero exhorta a Dina Boluarte reconocer a Edmundo González como presidente electo de Venezuela". Caretas. 7 January 2025. Archived from the original on 29 June 2025.
- "Alejandro Cavero: "Soy LGBT y orgullosamente de derecha"". El Comercio. 25 November 2021. Archived from the original on 29 June 2025.
- "Cavero propone privatización de la gestión carcelaria". Caretas. 8 April 2025. Archived from the original on 29 June 2025.
- Arroyo, Carlos (15 August 2022). "Proyecto de Ley de Alejandro Cavero no cumple con actuales estándares de Derechos Humanos, afirma Más Igualdad". Infobae. Archived from the original on 29 June 2025.
- León, Jessica (16 August 2022). "Presentan proyecto de unión civil, pero con limitaciones". La República. Archived from the original on 29 June 2025.
- Ricci, Agustin (2 December 2024). "Alejandro Cavero denuncia agresión física: «Me golpeó en la cara, rompió mis lentes y me lanzó un vaso»". LP Pasión por el Derecho. Archived from the original on 29 June 2025.
- Sugobono, Nora (16 January 2021). "Alejandro Cavero: el joven que soñó con ser PPK y ahora postula al Congreso por Avanza País". El Comercio. Archived from the original on 29 June 2025.

=== Web ===
- "Alejandro Enrique Cavero Alva". National Jury of Elections. Archived from the original on 29 June 2025.
