= El Búho =

Weekly newspaper based in Arequipa, Peru

- Founder(s): Alonso Ruiz Rosas; Mabel Cáceres; Odi Gonzales
- General manager: Mabel Cáceres
- Launched: 2000; 26 years ago
- Language: Spanish
- Website: elbuho.pe

El Búho (English: The Owl) is a weekly newspaper based in Arequipa, Peru that focuses on investigative journalism. The paper also publishes a magazine of the same name.

== History ==
During the 1990s, censorship in Peru was prevalent during the administration of Alberto Fujimori. In March 2000, El Búho was launched by Alonso Ruiz Rosas, Mabel Cáceres and Odi Gonzales as a response to the lack of press freedom in Peru. Cáceres continued to serve as the director of the newspaper, with her stories focusing on corruption in Peru and the reorganization of Fujimorism.

The newspaper engages in fact-checking reporting. In one incident, Infobae reported that El Búho fact-checked statements by Prime Minister Alberto Otárola, who said that dynamite was used in Arequipa during a period of widespread protests, with the newspaper contacting authorities who denied the reports.

== Collaboration ==
El Búho has collaborated with various media Latin American organizations in its reporting. Reporting on femicides in Peru, the newspaper worked with the journalistic collective Connectas, contributing to an initiative focused on gender-based violence in Latin America that also included Bolivia's Acceso, El Salvador's La Prensa Gráfica and Venezuela's Runrunes. The newspaper has also collaborated in press events with the Peruvian journalism website, La Mula.

== Press freedom ==
In 2004, IFEX reported that all copies of El Búho were purchased in Arequipa by men in vans that reportedly belonged to the National University of San Agustín; that day's edition of the newspaper reported on corruption and mismanagement within the university. The newspaper's director, Mabel Cáceres, faced one year in prison for her reporting on the university after its president, Rolando Cornejo Cuervo, brought forth defamation charges against her; the Overseas Press Club denounced the charges in a letter addressed to President Alejandro Toledo.

Cáceres was subjected to thirteen lawsuits between 2012 and 2014 and faces frequent death threats according to Reporters Without Borders. Much of the legal action toward Cáceres stemmed from her reporting on controversial mining operations near Arequipa.

== Reception ==
In 2014, Mabel Cáceres, the newspaper's director, was placed on Reporters Without Borders "100 Information Heroes" list.

Cáceres received the 2016 Courage In Journalism Award from the International Women's Media Foundation for her reporting, with the foundation writing "Cáceres continues to commit to strengthening independent media through telling truth to power." Aja Naomi King, who handed Cáceres the award, stated "I feel like we take for granted all the rights and privileges that we are given on a daily basis, ... To meet someone who wants to fight to just tell the truth about what’s happening in government ... this is a real life superhero right here."
