= Jesús Hurtado =

Peruvian politician (born 1947)

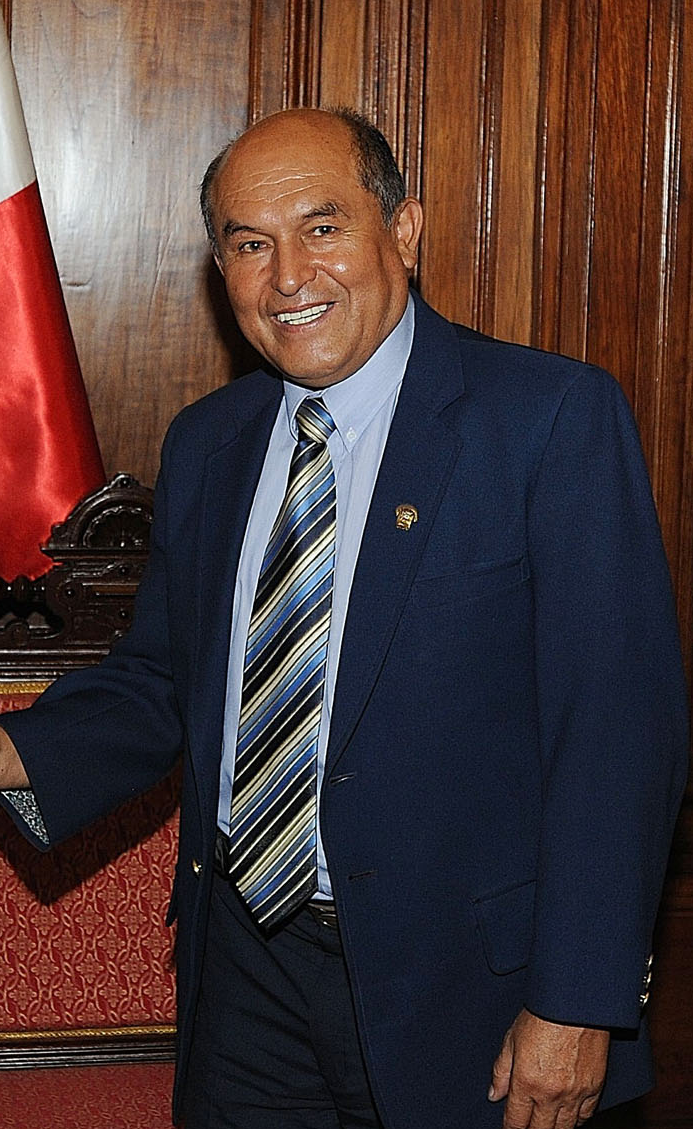

Member of Congress
- In office 26 July 2011 – 26 July 2016
- Constituency: Junín

Personal details
- Born: Jesús Pánfilo Hurtado Zamudio; 7 September 1947 (age 79) Jauja, Jauja, Junín, Peru
- Party: Popular Force
- Education: Andean University of Cuzco

Jesús Pánfilo Hurtado Zamudio (born 7 September 1947), is a Peruvian Fujimorist politician, psychologist and pastor. He was elected as a Congressman for the period 2011-2016.

== Biography ==
Jesús Hurtado Zamudio was born in the city of Jauja, Junín, on September 7, 1947, he is married with two children. He was an evangelical pastor in the city of Huancayo and an economics student at the National University of the Center From Peru. Jesús Hurtado Zamudio has studied Psychology at the Andean University of Cuzco as well as a master's degree in social health at the University of León and a specialization course in Missiology at the Freie Hochschule für Mission, Germany.

He was a congressional candidate for Junín for the Fujimorist party Force 2011, currently Popular Force, being elected for the period 2011-2016.
