= Roger Amuruz =

Peruvian politician (1958–2022)

Member of the Congress of the Republic of Peru
- In office 27 July 1995 – 26 July 2000

Member of the Democratic Constituent Congress
- In office 30 December 1992 – 26 July 1995

Personal details
- Born: Roger Amuruz Gallegos; 28 December 1958; Tambopata District, Peru
- Died: 18 October 2022 (aged 63); Lima, Peru
- Political party: Cambio 90
- Children: Rosselli Amuruz
- Education: National University of Engineering
- Occupation: Engineer

Roger Amuruz Gallegos (28 November 1958 – 18 October 2022) was a Peruvian engineer and politician. A member of Cambio 90, he served in the Democratic Constituent Congress from 1992 to 1995 and the Congress of the Republic from 1995 to 2000.

Amuruz died in Lima on 18 October 2022, at the age of 63.
