= Alejandro Soto Reyes =

Peruvian politician (born 1960)

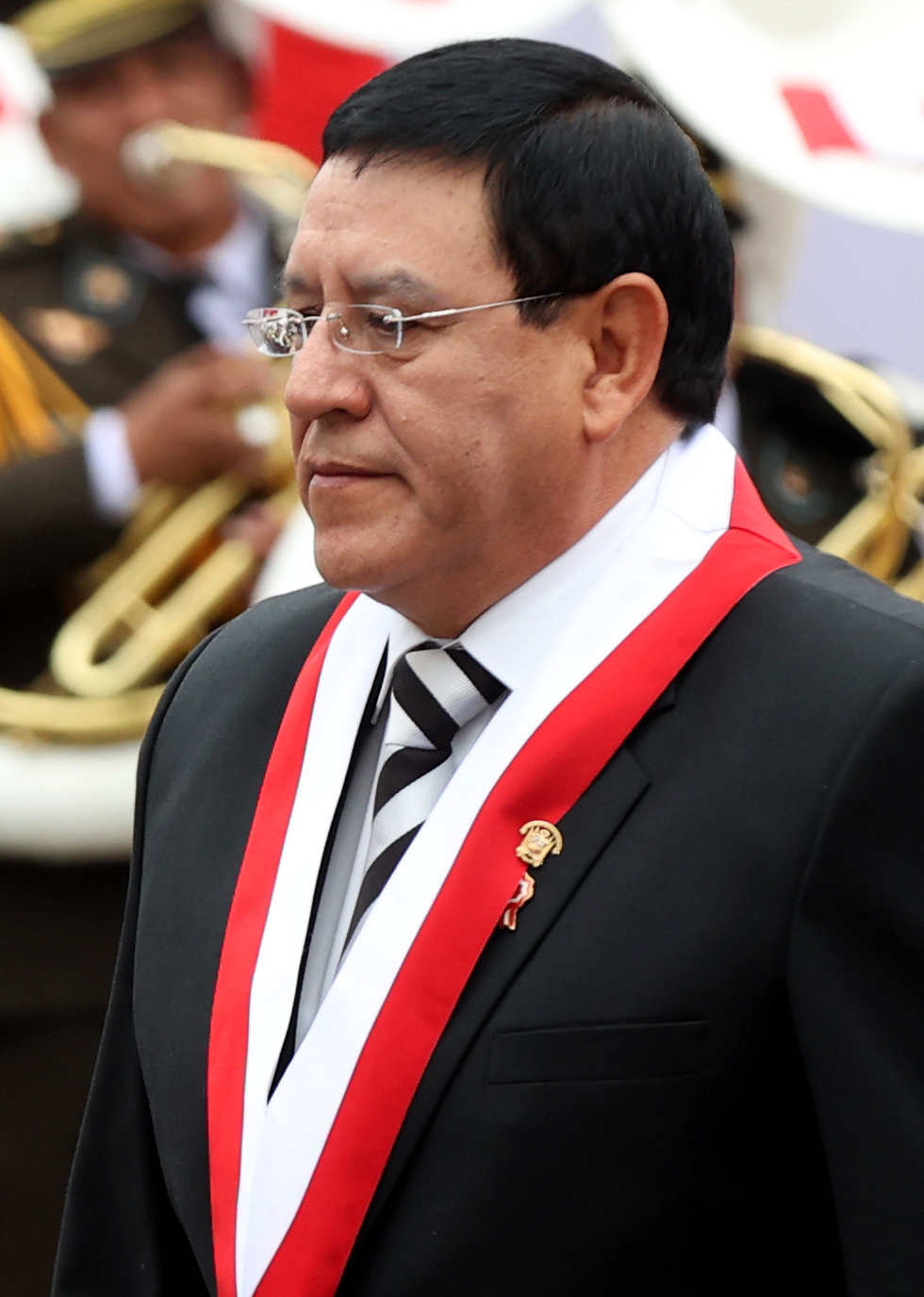
- Soto Reyes in 2023

President of Congress
- In office 27 July 2023 – 26 July 2024
- Vice President: 1st Vice President; Hernando Guerra García; Arturo Alegría; 2nd Vice President; Waldemar Cerrón; 3rd Vice President; Rosselli Amuruz
- Preceded by: José Williams
- Succeeded by: Eduardo Salhuana

Member of Congress
- In office 27 July 2021 – 26 July 2026
- Constituency: Cusco

Personal details
- Born: Alejandro Soto Reyes; 24 May 1960 (age 66) Cusco, Santiago District, Peru
- Party: Alliance for Progress
- Education: Andean University of Cuzco
- Occupation: Lawyer, politician

Alejandro Soto Reyes (born 24 May 1960) is a Peruvian lawyer and politician. He was elected Congressman of the Republic of Peru for the period 2021–2026. Before entering politics, he worked at a local television station.

== Education ==
Reyes was born in Cusco on May 24, 1960. He completed his primary and secondary education in his hometown, and graduated from the Andean University of Cuzco in 1990 as a lawyer. He completed graduate studies in civil law and civil procedure at National University of Saint Anthony the Abbot in Cuzco.

== Political career ==
His entry into politics was triggered by his election as an independent in the 1995 local elections, when he was elected as a councillor for the Santiago district. In the 2006 Cusco City Council elections, the national election jury disqualified and suspended him for his improper conduct. He joined Alliance for Progress led by Cesar Acuña in 2008.

He was elected to represent Cusco in the 2021 congressional elections by Alliance for Progress. He took office on July 27 of the same year. He also served as spokesman for Alliance for Progress party before becoming President of the Congress.

In December 2022, riots in the city of Cusco targeted the television station where Reyes once worked, in protest at his statements in congress.

In July 2023, he ran for President of the Congress of the Republic with Hernando Guerra Garcia as First Vice President, Waldemar Cerrón as Second Vice President, and Rosselli Amuruz as Third Vice President. On July 26, Soto was elected President of the Congress of the Republic, defeating his opponent, Luis Aragon (Popular Action), in the 2023-2024 Annual Congress.
