= Magisterial Bloc of National Concertation =

Magisterial Bloc of National Concertation Bloque Magisterial de Concertación Nacional
- Abbreviation: BMCN
- Leader: Álex Paredes
- Parliamentary speakers: Katy Ugarte; Segundo Quiroz; Edgar Tello
- Founded: 14 May 2022
- Dissolved: 19 July 2025
- Split from: Free Peru
- Headquarters: Lima
- Ideology: Democratic socialism Pro-Pedro Castillo
- Political position: Left-wing

Website
- Facebook page

The Magisterial Bloc of National Concertation (Spanish: Bloque Magisterial de Concertación Nacional; BMCN) is a left-wing parliamentary group of the Congress of the Republic of Peru. Formed on 14 May 2022, it brings together several dissident legislators from Peru Libre. The group was classified as pro-Castillo administration.

== History ==
=== Foundation ===
On May 11, 2022, ten congressmen from the Free Peru parliamentary group announced their resignation due to a disagreement over the election of the new magistrates of the Constitutional Court, without prior discussion. However, congresswoman and former minister Katy Ugarte contests the resignation after this event, but alludes to a group agreement that had been prepared for a long time, and whose press conference was scheduled for the same day. According to the elected official, "they got ahead of us" (referring to the media, having disclosed the information and resignation letters).

On May 14, the ten resigning congressmen, from the "teaching wing" of the Peru Libre party, announced the creation of the "Magisterial Block of National Concertation" group.

=== Composition ===
On May 17, although the formation of the group is not confirmed by Congress, despite the request, the journalist from El Comercio Martín Hidalgo reveals that the group could finally be made up of 6 members against the 10 announced in the resignations, for administrative reasons.

The main problem found is the presence of four parliamentarians who are still officially registered within the Free Peru party in the National Jury of Elections, that is, the institution that regulates the parties and the national elections and the different elections.

As stipulated in article 37 of the Regulations of the Congress of the Republic, "in no case may the members of Congress who belong to the same party form a separate parliamentary group", preventing these same four parliamentarians from joining the new group. Those affected are the third spokesman for the group, Edgar Tello, and 3 other members, Francis Paredes, Paul Gutiérrez, and Lucinda Vásquez.

Therefore, the group could be formalized by the presidency of Congress with only six members.

== Ideology ==
The group can be designated as leftist, since the members are from a wing of Free Peru. The main difference in terms of which party supports Pedro Castillo is that teachers want to evolve within the committees and want to chair the Education Committee.

This presidency of the Education Commission is the main point of divergence between Peru Libre and the teaching wing, since at the beginning of the legislature in July 2021, the presidency of the commission had been granted to the Popular Renewal party, positioned on the right, due to the bad negotiations of the leaders of the Free Peru, Waldemar Cerrón and Guido Bellido.

However, the group will not break the institutional balance since the group also supports Pedro Castillo, as indicated by Waldemar Cerrón, the leader of Free Peru in Congress. They do not want the presidential vacancy of the president, they are in favor of the Constituent assembly, and the magisterial wing has voted in the past in favor of the electoral and academic counter-reforms proposed by Free Peru.

However, this same group may try to interfere in the government and upset the balance created during the government. This teaching wing had been able to have a representative during the first government, with teacher Iber Maraví as Minister of Labor. In addition, Edgar Tello, one of the group's spokesmen, calls for President Pedro Castillo to "decide which party is really in power", since Pedro Castillo is in theory more linked to the teachers.

== Members ==
Congressmen	Political party	District
Álex Paredes	Independent	Arequipa
Segundo Quiroz	Independent	Cajamarca
Katy Ugarte	Independent	Cuzco
Elizabeth Medina	Independent	Huánuco
Paul Gutiérrez	Perú Libre	Apurimac
Germán Tacuri	Independent	Ayacucho
Lucinda Vásquez	Perú Libre	San Martín
Óscar Zea	Independent	Puno
