= Andean University of Cuzco =

Private university in Cuzco, Peru

Coordinates: 13°32′14″S 71°54′14″W

- Universidad Andina del Cusco
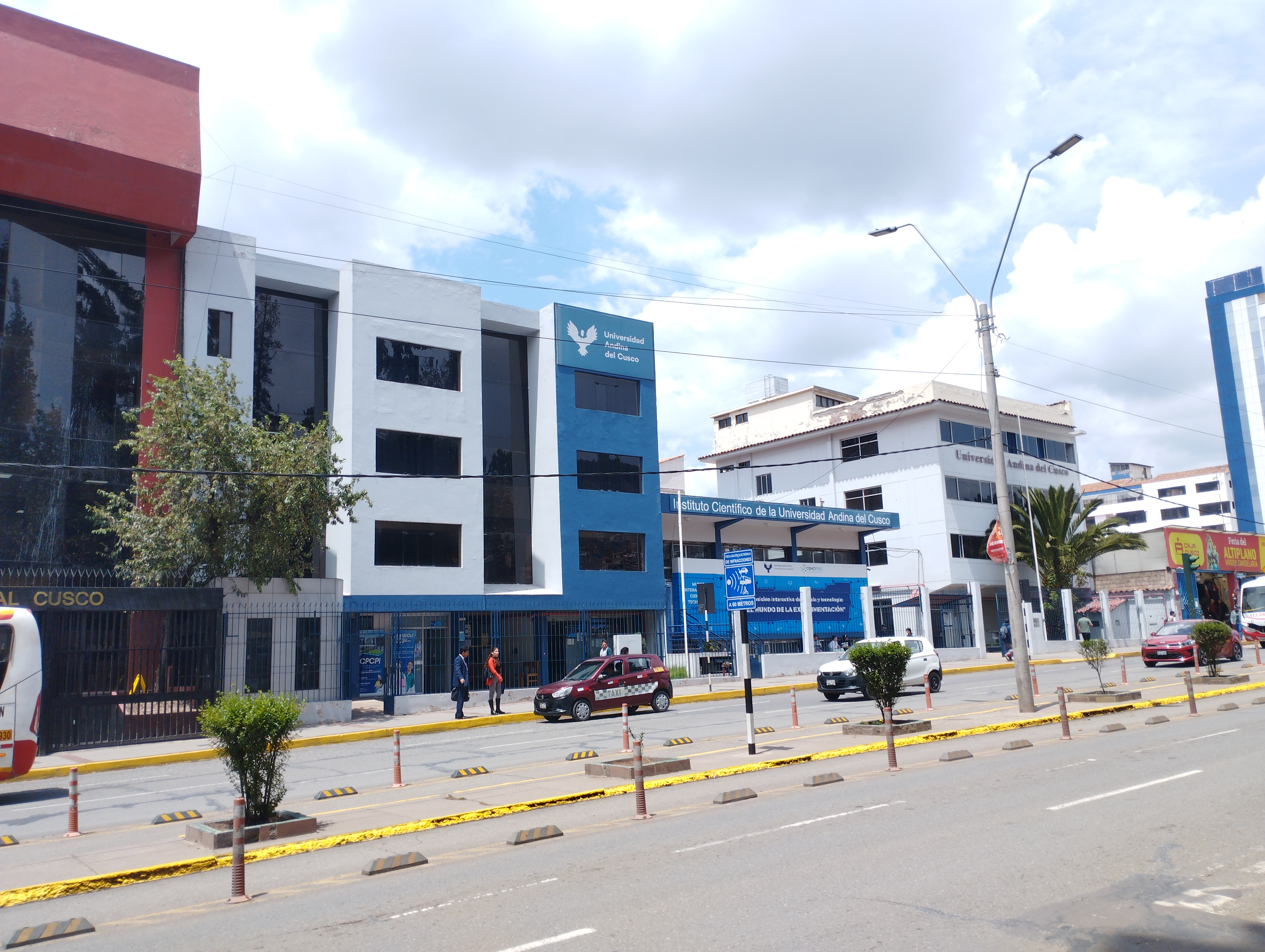
- Motto: Sabiduría que vive en ti
- Motto in English: Wisdom that lives in you
- Type: Private university
- Established: May 23, 1984
- Accreditation: SUNEDU
- Rector: Yanira Bravo Gonzales
- Total staff: 300
- Students: 7,000
- Location: Cuzco, Peru
- Colours: Blue, Sky blue
- Mascot: Andean condor
- Website: uandina.edu.pe
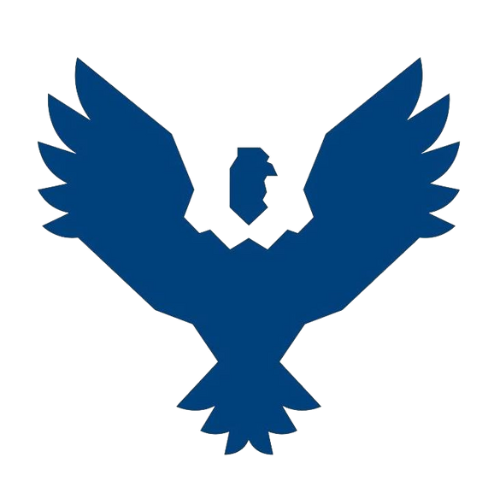

The Andean University of Cuzco (Spanish: Universidad Andina del Cusco, UAC) is a private university headquartered in Cuzco, Peru.

== History ==
The university was founded on October 5, 1979, although Law Nº 23387 of May 23, 1984, formally and legally established the university's existence.

The process of accreditation began in 1996, with efforts consolidating in 2011 with the creation of a directorate dedicated to said efforts. An agreement was signed in 2014 with the International Network of Evaluators (RIEV) to begin another process for four of its careers, which successfully concluded the following year. Additional accreditations were obtained in 2019 and 2020, while state-owned SUNEDU granted its six-year accreditation in 2023.

== Notable alumni ==
- Jesús Hurtado, politician
- Alejandro Soto Reyes, lawyer and politician

== See also ==
- List of universities in Peru
