= María Elena Moyano =

Peruvian community organizer and activist

- Born: María Elena Moyano Delgado; 29 November 1958; Santiago de Surco, Lima, Peru
- Died: 15 February 1992 (aged 33); Villa El Salvador, Lima, Peru
- Cause of death: Assassination
- Spouse: Gustavo Pineki (m. 1980)
- Children: 2
- Relatives: Martha Moyano (sister)

María Elena Moyano Delgado (29 November 1958 – 15 February 1992) was an Afro-Peruvian community organizer and feminist who was assassinated by the Shining Path. She grew up in poverty in the Villa El Salvador pueblo joven, then became involved in local activism. She was twice president of FEPOMUVES (the Popular Federation of Women of Villa El Salvador) and at the time of her death was deputy mayor. Her funeral was attended by 300,000 people and resulted in a downturn in support for the Shining Path. She was posthumously awarded the Peruvian Order of Merit.

== Early life ==
María Elena Moyano was born in Santiago de Surco in Lima on 29 November 1958. She had six siblings and her parents were Eugenia Delgado Cabrera and Hermógenes Moyano Lescano. The family moved to the Villa El Salvador pueblo joven when she was 13. She grew up in poverty and won a scholarship to study law at the Inca Garcilaso de la Vega University, but then stopped her studies after two years in order to concentrate on community activism. Moyano married Gustavo Pineki in 1980 and they had two children.

== Activism ==
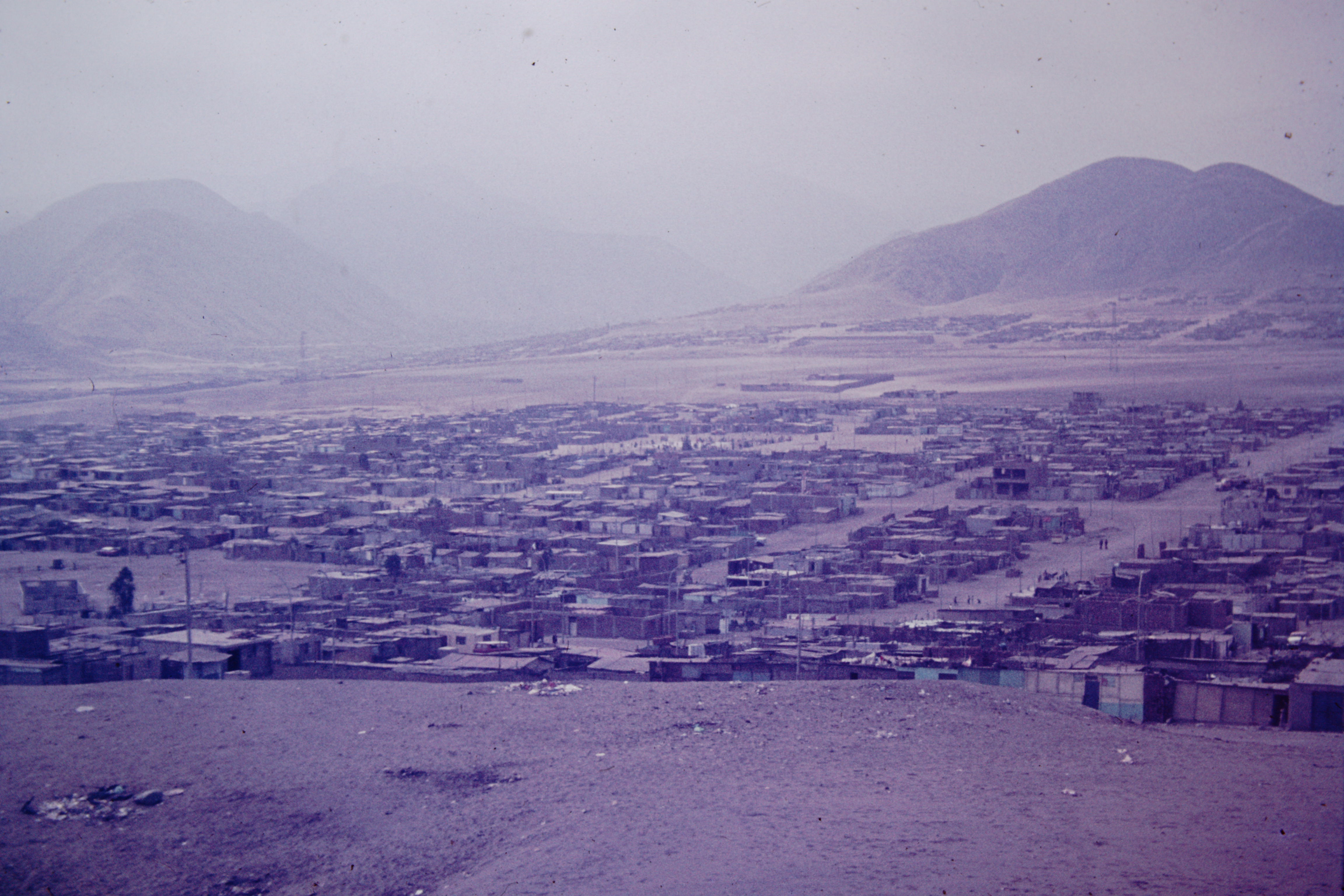
Villa El Salvador pictured in 1975

In Villa El Salvador, Moyano helped to set up primary schools, soup kitchens and clubs for mothers. In 1983, Moyano was involved in the foundation of the Federacion Popular de Mujeres de Villa El Salvador (FEPOMUVES, Popular Federation of Women of Villa El Salvador). The group provided training for women, set up projects and represented their interests. Moyano was twice elected president. The federation organized neighbourhood cafes and ran the Vaso de Leche program, which aimed to get every child in the shanty town to drink a glass of milk every day. The initiative was started by Mayor of Lima Alfonso Barrantes Lingán and the United Left, then taken over by FEPOMUVES. By 1991, Moyano was deputy mayor of Villa El Salvador. The same year, the Shining Path (Sendero Luminoso) bombed a FEPOMUVES distribution hub from which 90 cafes were supported.

Moyano was critical of both the Peruvian government led by Alberto Fujimori and the Shining Path. She thought the administration was weak in imposing order and that the police were corrupt. Fujimori was imposing radical austerity measures that were leading to crippling inflation. Even though she was aware that she could be assassinated, she also took a stand against the Shining Path, saying that their actions were no longer revolutionary. The Shining Path responded by denouncing her as "revisionist". After the Shining Path published a leaflet denouncing her which stated she worked for the government and had herself bombed the distribution centre, Moyano replied refuting the accusations. Juana López León, another Vaso de Leche activist, was murdered by the Shining Path on 31 August 1991 and Moyano started to receive death threats. She briefly left the country and when she returned was given two police bodyguards. When the Shining Path called for an armed strike and for everyone to stay home on 14 February 1992, she protested by leading a peace march. Moyano believed in non-violence, speaking in favour of social justice and self-government.

== Assassination ==
On 15 February 1992, Moyano was shot dead in front of her sons at a communal event in Villa El Salvador by members of the Shining Path. The assassins first shot her and then blew her body up with explosives.

=== Funeral ===
An estimated 300,000 people attended the funeral of María Elena Moyano. Alongside the capture of the leader of the Sendero Luminoso, Abimael Guzmán, in September 1992, outrage at the murder of Moyano is seen as a major step in the drop in support for the group. President Pedro Pablo Kuczynski posthumously gave the Peruvian Order of Merit for Distinguished Service to Moyano. It was accepted by her mother in 2017.

== Legacy ==
The film Coraje (Courage) was released in 1998. It told a fictionalised version of Moyano's life. Amnesty International released a report on human rights in Peru in 1997 which was dedicated to the memory of Moyano. The Center for Latin American and Caribbean Studies at the University of Illinois at Urbana–Champaign set up the María Elena Moyano Fellowship Fund in 2017, in order to fund Spanish-speaking graduate students from Latin America.

Her sister Martha Moyano also become a congresswoman.
