= Alejandro Muñante =

Peruvian politician (born 1987)

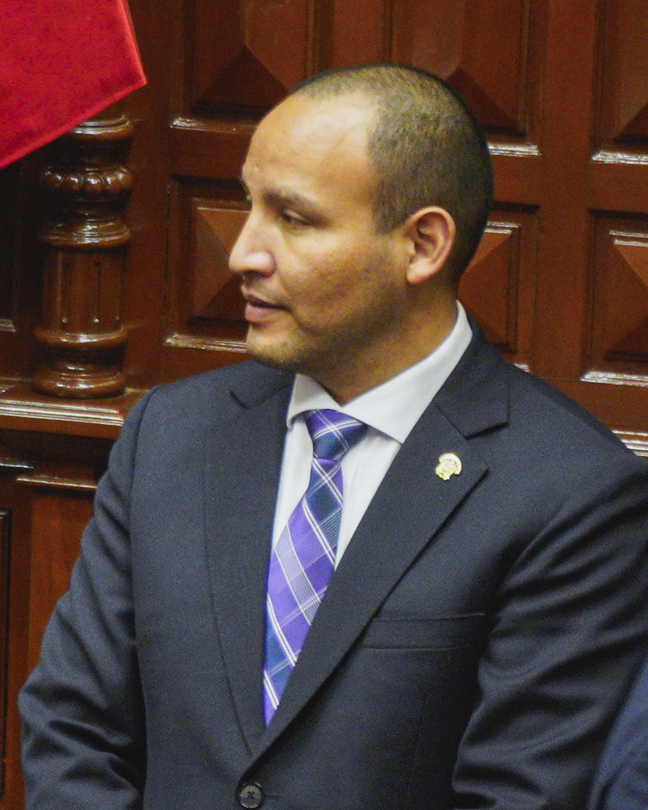
- Muñante in 2022

First Vice President of the Senate
- Incumbent
- Assumed office 27 July 2026
- President: Miki Torres
- Preceded by: Fernando Rospigliosi

Third Vice President of Congress
- In office c. 2 August 2022 – 26 July 2023
- President: Lady Camones; Martha Moyano; José Williams
- Preceded by: Wilmar Elera
- Succeeded by: Rosselli Amuruz

Senator of the Republic
- Incumbent
- Assumed office 27 July 2026
- Constituency: Nationwide

Member of Congress
- In office 27 July 2021 – 26 July 2026
- Constituency: Lima

Personal details
- Born: 2 March 1987 (age 39)
- Party: Popular Renewal

Alejandro Muñante Barrios (born 2 March 1987) is a Peruvian politician serving as a member of the Congress of the Republic since 2021. From 2022 to 2023, he served as third vice president of the Congress; and as first vice president of the Senate since 2026.
