= Martha Moyano =

Peruvian nurse and politician

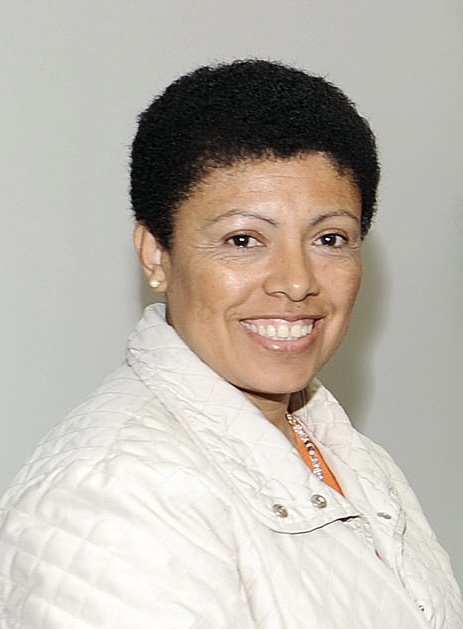
- Moyano in 2010

President of Congress
- Acting; 5 September 2022 – 12 September 2022
- Vice President: 1st Vice President; Herself; 2nd Vice President; Digna Calle; 3rd Vice President; Alejandro Muñante
- Preceded by: Lady Camones
- Succeeded by: José Williams
Congress roles
First Vice President of Congress
In office 27 July 2022 – 26 July 2023
President	Lady Camones; Herself (Interim); José Williams
Preceded by	Lady Camones
Succeeded by	Hernando Guerra García
Second Vice President of Congress
In office 27 July 2007 – 26 July 2008
President	Luis Gonzales Posada
Preceded by	Fabiola Morales
Succeeded by	Álvaro Gutiérrez

Senator of the Republic
- Incumbent
- Assumed office 26 July 2026
- Constituency: Nationwide

Member of Congress
- In office 27 July 2021 – 26 July 2026
- Constituency: Lima
- In office 29 August 2001 – 26 July 2011
- Constituency: Lima
- In office 27 July 2000 – 26 July 2001
- Preceded by: Carmen Lozada
- Constituency: Lima

Lima Metropolitan Councillor
- In office 1 January 2019 – 12 March 2021
- Succeeded by: Jorge Nakamura

Personal details
- Born: Martha Lupe Moyano Delgado; October 14, 1964 (age 61) Callao, Perú
- Party: Popular Force (2020-present)
- Other political affiliations: Independent (2010-2020); Sí Cumple (2004-2010)

Martha Lupe Moyano Delgado (born October 14, 1964) is a Peruvian nurse, Fujimorist politician and a congresswoman representing Lima for the 2021–2026 term, previously serving in the 2000–2001, 2001–2006, and 2006-2011 terms. Moyano belongs to the Alliance for the Future party. She is the sister of María Elena Moyano, who was assassinated by Shining Path.

== Early life and education ==
Moyano was born in Callao on October 14, 1964. She is the daughter of Hermógenes Moyano Lescano and Eugenia Delgado Cabrera. Her sister was María Elena Moyano, a Peruvian activist who was shot and dynamited by the Shining Path terrorist group in Villa El Salvador.

She completed her early school studies at Colegio 6069 Pachacútec in Villa El Salvador.

She began her technical studies in nursing at the Andrés Belaúnde Study Center in 1978 and finished in 1981. In 2010, she began studying law at Telesup University.

== Political career ==
Her political career began in the municipal elections of 1995, where she was a candidate as councilor of Lima for Cambio 90 - Nueva Mayoría. However, she was not elected.

She ran for mayor of Villa El Salvador in the municipal elections of 1998, for Vamos Vecino, again without success.

=== First Congressional Career ===
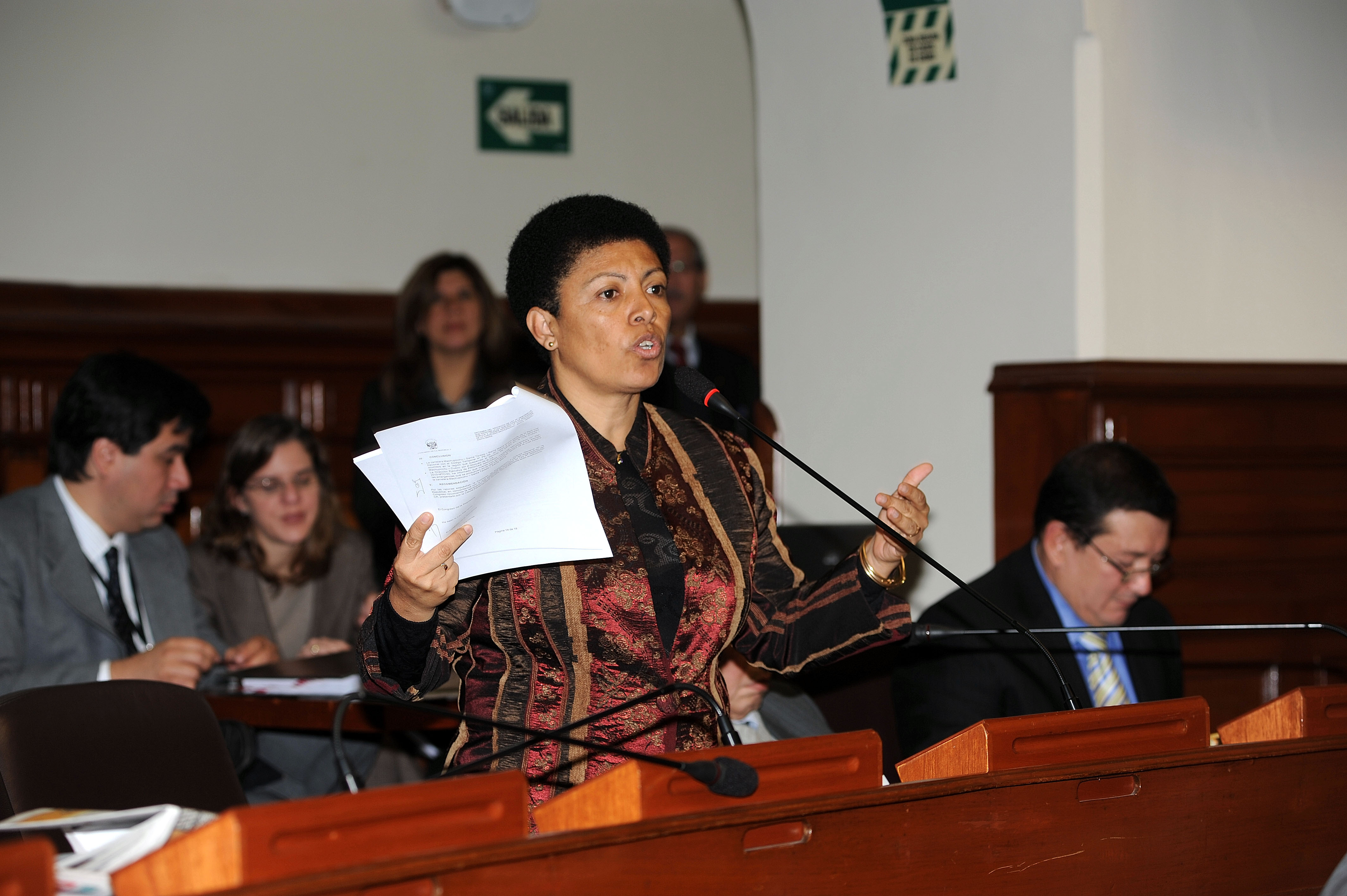
Moyano in 2010

In the 2000 general elections, Moyano was elected congresswoman of the republic by the Peru 2000 alliance, with 25,802 votes, for the 2000–2005 parliamentary term.

In November 2000, her parliamentary position was reduced until 2001 after the publication of electoral fraud and Alberto Fujimori's resignation from the presidency of the republic, by fax from Japan. In the same year, new general elections were called for 2001, in which Moyano sought re-election to Congress with Cambio 90 - Nueva Mayoría, without success.

In August 2001, after Congresswoman Carmen Lozada was removed from office for corruption, Moyano was summoned by Congress to fill the seat. She was sworn in as an assistant congresswoman for the 2001-2006 parliamentary term.

In the 2006 general elections, she was again elected congresswoman for Alianza por el Futuro, with 9,938 votes, for the 2006-2011 parliamentary period.

During her parliamentary work, she was the second vice president of Congress on the board of directors chaired by Luis Gonzales Posada (2007-2008). Between 2009 and 2011, she fulfilled her work as a congresswoman in the different work commissions of the Congress of the Republic, such as Decentralization, Constitution, Housing, and Lifting of Immunity.

Completing her legislative work, Moyano again attempted her re-election to Congress in the 2011 general elections by Fuerza 2011 led by Keiko Fujimori. However, she was not reelected.

=== Alderman of Lima ===
In the municipal elections of 2018, Moyano was elected alderman of Lima, by Fuerza Popular, for the municipal period 2019–2022.

She resigned in 2020 to run as a candidate for Congress in the 2021 elections.

=== Second Congressional Career ===
In the 2021 general elections, Moyano was again elected congresswoman of the republic by Fuerza Popular, with 23,262 votes, for the 2021-2026 parliamentary term. From 8 to 12 of September 2022, she served as the interim president of Peruvian Congress.

== Controversies ==
=== Conviction for defamation ===
On January 22, 2019, she was sentenced to two years in prison for the crime of aggravated defamation with the sentence suspended. She accused Jenny Romero Coro, in 2017, of being a participant in the murder of María Elena Moyano. She was sentenced in the first instance, but, after the appeal, the sentence was dismissed.
