= Hernando Guerra García =

Peruvian politician (1963–2023)

Hernando Guerra-García
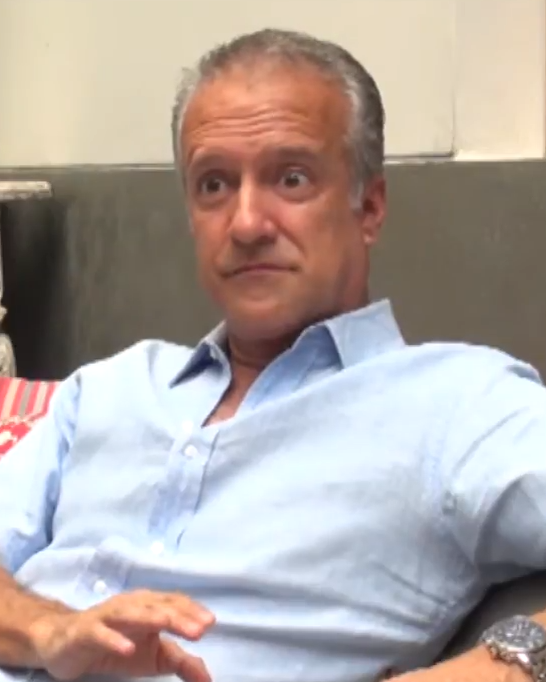

First Vice President of Congress
- In office 26 July 2023 – 29 September 2023
- President: Alejandro Soto Reyes
- Preceded by: Martha Moyano
- Succeeded by: Arturo Alegría

Congress Spokesperson of Popular Force
- In office 27 July 2021 – 26 July 2022
- President: Keiko Fujimori
- Preceded by: Diethell Columbus
- Succeeded by: Patricia Juárez

Member of Congress
- In office 26 July 2021 – 29 September 2023
- Succeeded by: Fernando Rospigliosi
- Constituency: Lima

Personal details
- Born: 14 May 1963 Lima, Peru
- Died: 29 September 2023 (aged 60)
- Parent(s): Roger Guerra-García; Mabel Campos Montoya

Hernando Guerra-García Campos (14 May 1963 – 29 September 2023), better known as Nano Guerra, was a Peruvian politician, businessman, and television presenter. He served as a congressman representing Lima for Fuerza Popular from 27 July 2021, until his death in office.

== Early life and career ==
He was born in Lima on 14 May 1963. He was the son of former Congressman Roger Guerra-García and Mabel Campos Montoya, who died when he was sixteen. His grandfather, Antenor Guerra-García Vallejo, was the president of the Superior Court of Cajamarca.

He attended Sagrados Corazones Recoleta School in Lima.

He studied Law at the Pontifical Catholic University of Peru, where he earned a bachelor's degree. He also earned a master's degree in Business Administration (MBA) from ESAN University.

In 1990, he was the deputy director of El Peruano, the official newspaper of the Republic of Peru, where he was part of the newspaper's relaunch project. During his time at the newspaper, he had a section called "Los perfiles del carajo," a nod to the book Profiles in Courage by John F. Kennedy. He worked at the newspaper until 1994.

He served as the Head of Communications for the National Superintendence of Customs and Tax Administration (Sunat) until 1996.

In 2001, he founded "Clientes y Organizaciones," and in 2004, he was part of the team behind the television program "Somos empresa." The show received awards from the ANDA and was considered the best economic-themed TV program in 2008. In the show, he was the host, and topics like entrepreneurship and management were discussed. In 2010, the show received a Guinness World Records recognition for its duration.

In 2009, the National Society of Industries recognized him for his work. The institution's president, Pedro Olaechea, presented him with a recognition for promoting business topics in the media and emphasizing that small and medium-sized enterprises are fundamental for the country.

He became one of the most recognized figures in the field of entrepreneurship and business in Peru. Nano Guerra's work encouraged entrepreneurship, which earned him the recognition of several public and private institutions. He became known as a promoter of entrepreneurship and small business development, and he often shared his insights and advice through various media platforms.

Guerra-García had a strong social media presence, especially on Twitter, where he had a significant following and used the platform to express his views on politics, economics, and social issues. His outspoken and at times controversial statements generated both support and criticism.

== Political career ==
Guerra-García entered politics as a member of the party Fuerza Popular. In the 2021 Peruvian general election, he ran as a candidate for Congress representing the Electoral District of Lima. He was elected and took office on 27 July 2021, representing the Fujimorist party in the Congress of the Republic of Peru.

During his time in Congress, Guerra-García was known for his active participation in various legislative activities. He served as the spokesperson for Fuerza Popular from 27 July 2021, to 26 July 2022 before being succeeded by Patricia Juárez. In Congress, he was involved in debates and discussions related to various issues, including the economy, education, and the political landscape of Peru.

On 26 July 2023 he was elected First Vicepresident of Congress, for the 2023-2024 term.

Guerra-García's sudden death on 29 September 2023, due to a myocardial infarction, marked the end of his political and public career.

After his death his seat wad occupied by fellow Fuerza Popular member Fernando Rospigliosi

== Death ==
Nano Guerra died on 29 September 2023, at the age of 60, due to a myocardial infarction. His death was widely reported in the Peruvian media, and it was met with condolences and tributes from various political figures, colleagues, and members of the public.
