= Odi Gonzales =

Peruvian Quechua writer (born 1962)

Odi Gonzáles
- Born: 1962 (age 63–64); Calca, Peru
- Education: University of Maryland, College Park
- Occupations: Writer, professor
- Writing career
- Language: Quechua, Spanish
- Years active: 1988–present
- Genres: Poetry, non-fiction
- Notable work: Tunupa. El libro de las sirenas (2002)
- Notable awards: Peru's Cesar Vallejo Poetry Prize

Odi Gonzales (born 1962) is a Peruvian writer, translator and university professor. His literary works are written in Quechua and Spanish.

== Life and career ==
Odi Gonzales was born in Calca, Peru (Cusco region). He studied literature in Peru and then obtained a master's degree at the University of Maryland, College Park. He currently teaches Quechua and Spanish at New York University.

He published in Spanish the poetry books Juego de niños (1988), Valle sagrado (1993), Almas en pena (1998) and La escuela de Cusco (2005). In 1992 Gonzales obtained the César Vallejo National Poetry Prize and the Poetry Prize by National University of San Marcos in Lima. In 2002, he published Tunupa. El libro de las sirenas, a book with poems in Quechua. In 2000 Gonzales published a Spanish translation of the Quechua poetry book Taki parwa by Andrés Alencastre Gutiérrez. In 2019 he was an invited speaker at the literary Hay Festival in Arequipa. In 2014 some of his poems were translated into English by Lynn Levin, writer and instructor at the University of Pennsylvania.

== Works ==
=== Poetry ===
- La Escuela de Cusco (2005)
- Almas en Pena (1998)
- Valle Sagrado (1993)
- Juego de Ninos (1988)
- Tunupa: El Libro de las Sirenas (2002)
- Birds on the kiswar tree: poems (2014)

=== Translations ===
- Kilku Warak'a (Andrés Alencastre Gutiérrez): Taki parwa. Biblioteca Municipal del Cusco, 2008.
