= Enrique Wong Pujada =

Peruvian politician (1941–2024)

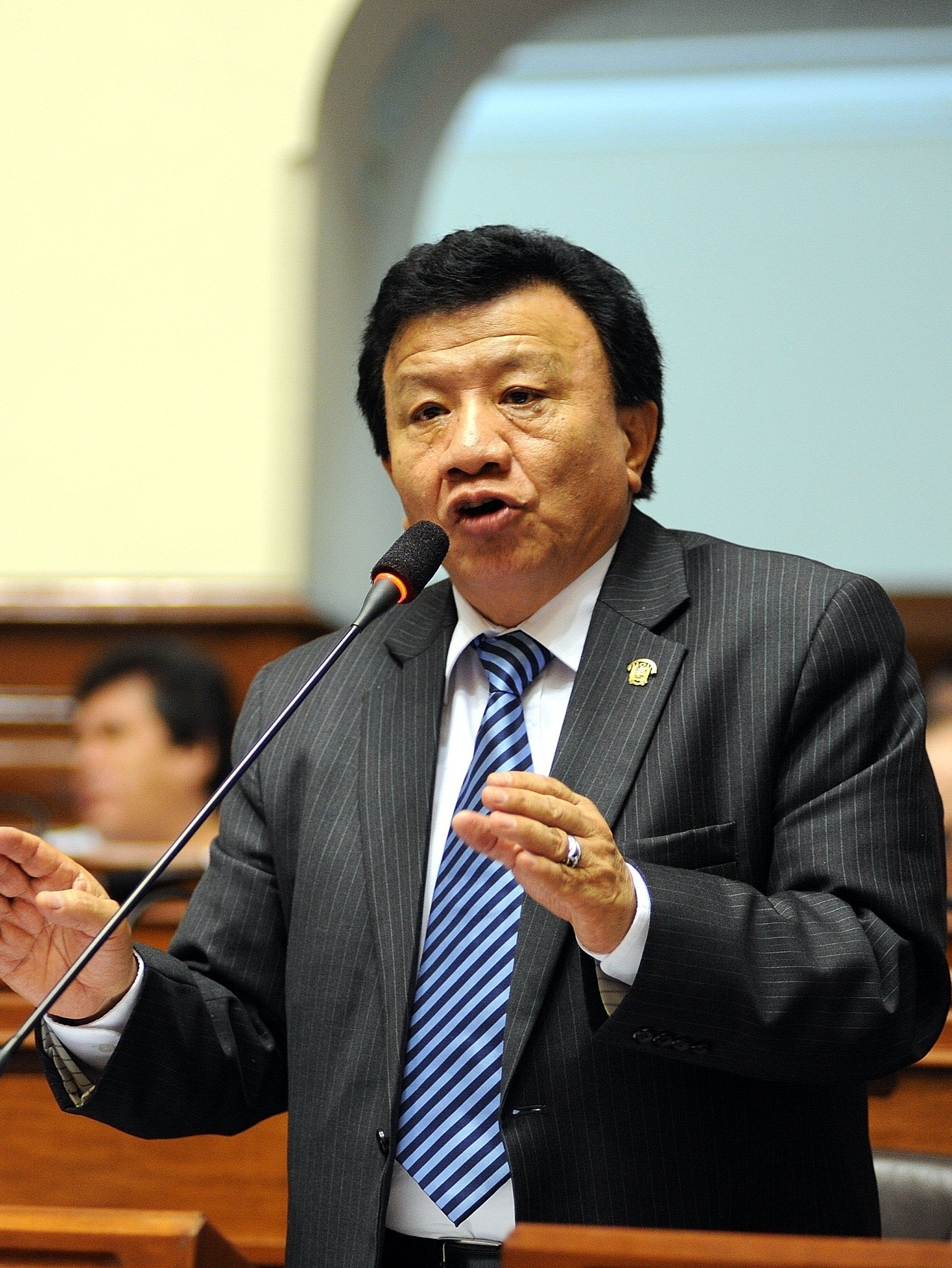
- Enrique Wong Pujada

Member of Congress
- In office 26 July 2021 – 13 July 2024
- Succeeded by: Ariana Orué
- Constituency: Callao
- In office 26 July 2011 – 26 July 2016
- Constituency: Callao

Second Vice President of Congress
- In office 26 July 2021 – 26 July 2022
- President: Maricarmen Alva
- Preceded by: Luis Roel
- Succeeded by: Digna Calle

San Martín de Porres District Councilman
- In office 1 January 1999 – 31 December 2002

Member of the Chamber of Deputies
- In office 26 July 1985 – 26 July 1990
- Constituency: Callao

Callao Province Councilman
- In office 1 January 1981 – 31 December 1983

Personal details
- Born: Enrique Wong Pujada; 26 June 1941 Lima, Peru
- Died: 13 July 2024 (aged 83) Lima, Peru
- Party: Podemos Perú (2018–2024)
- Other political affiliations: National Solidarity (2013–2016); Alliance for the Great Change (non-affiliated / until 2013); National Justice (2006); Vamos Vecino (1990s–2000s); Peruvian Aprista Party (1980s–1990s)
- Education: Escuela Superior Médica de México
- Occupation: Politician
- Profession: Medical doctor

Enrique Wong Pujada (26 June 1941 – 13 July 2024) was a Peruvian politician of Chinese descent. He was elected as a Congressman of the Republic of Peru in the 2011 elections for the 2011–2016 term, representing Callao. He was elected under the Alliance for the Great Change ticket and later left and joined National Solidarity. He was previously a Deputy representing Callao from 1985 to 1990. He was previously a District Councilor representing San Martín de Porres from 1999 to 2002, elected under the Fujimorist Vamos Vecino of Alberto Fujimori. In the 2018 regional elections, he ran for Regional Governor of Callao under the newly Podemos Perú party, but he was not elected, attaining only 3.6% of the vote.

In 1998, he was elected district councilor of San Martín de Porres by the Vamos Vecino movement, a position he held between 1999 and 2002.

In the 2002 regional elections, he unsuccessfully ran for the position of Callao regional councilor for the Independent Movement Chim Pum Callao.

In the general elections of 2006 he ran for Congress for the National Justice party, without being elected. Nor was his candidacy for the provincial mayor of Callao successful in the 2010 regional elections, running for the Mi Callao movement, and losing the elections again, this time against Juan Sotomayor García.

In 1966, he graduated as a doctor at the Medical School of Mexico, and in 1972 he completed a postgraduate degree in internal medicine at the Mexican Institute of Social Security. He served as general manager of his family-founded clinic in San Martín de Porres, Lima, between 2003 and 2009.

Wong died from cancer in Lima, on 13 July 2024, at the age of 83.

== Controversy ==
In 2011, Wong was accused by his sister of mismanaging his family clinic for personal gain and tax avoidance.
