= Women's University of the Sacred Heart =

Private women's university in Lima, Peru

- Universidad Femenina del Sagrado Corazón
- Motto: Espacio Académico para Mujeres Líderes
- Type: Private
- Established: 24 December 1962
- Rector: Dr. Carmela María Jesús Alarcón Revilla, rsc
- Location: Avenida Los Frutales 954, Urbanización Santa Magdalena Sofía, La Molina, Lima, Peru; 12.0717°S 76.9658°W
- Campus: Urban
- Colours: Green and White
- Nickname: UNIFÉ
- Website: www.unife.edu.pe

The Women's University of the Sacred Heart (Spanish: Universidad Femenina del Sagrado Corazón; UNIFÉ) is a private university for women, located in the city of Lima, Peru. It was founded and sponsored by the Congregation of Sisters of the Sacred Heart of Jesus of the Catholic Church on December 24, 1962. Its headquarters are in the district of La Molina.

== History and purpose ==
=== History ===
It was created in Lima by the Congregation of Religious of the Sacred Heart (present in education in Peru since 1876) and authorized by Supreme Decree 71 of December 24, 1962, given under the government of the Military junta presided over by the general Ricardo Pérez Godoy. Its peculiarity was that it was designed to be only for women.

The Graduate School was created in 1971, initiating its academic activities with the programs of doctorate and masters in Education. The master's degree in Psychology and Philosophy were created in 1988, and the doctorate in Psychology in 1994; subsequently, created the master's degree in Civil Law and Nutrition and Dietetics.

=== Purpose ===
In addition to the general aims of every university, its purpose is to give to the female youth a more integral formation, not only academic and scientific, but humanistic and ethical, under Christian and Catholic inspiration, which leads it to project towards the achievement of a Society more just, supportive and inclusive. In that sense, UNIFÉ continues one of the objectives of the Congregation: "To emphasize the formation of multipliers and leaders who are agents of social transformation".
