= Arturo Alegría =

Peruvian politician (born 1988)

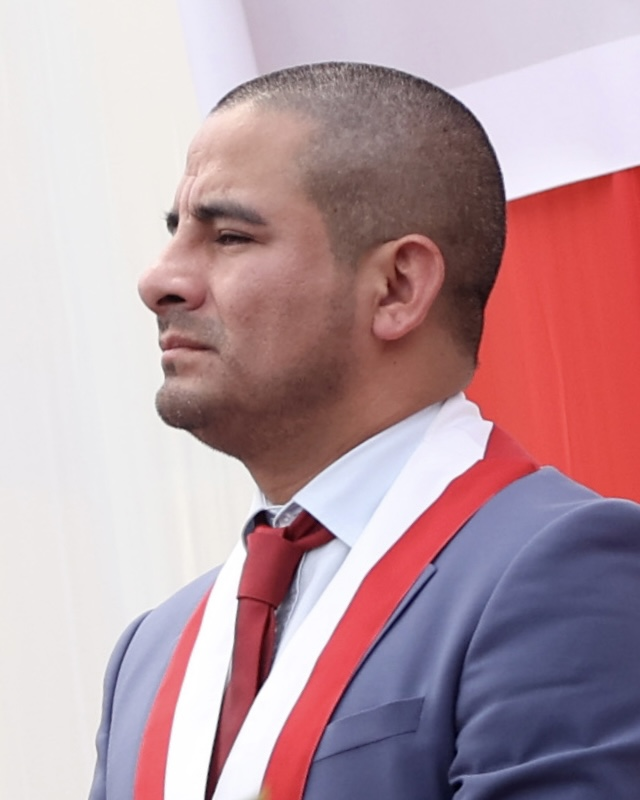
- Alegría in 2024

First Vice President of Congress
- In office 5 October 2023 – 26 July 2024
- President: Alejandro Soto Reyes
- Preceded by: Hernando Guerra García
- Succeeded by: Patricia Juárez

Member of the Chamber of Deputies
- Incumbent
- Assumed office 26 July 2026
- Constituency: San Martín

Member of Congress
- In office 27 July 2021 – 26 July 2026
- Constituency: San Martín

Personal details
- Born: 3 August 1988 (age 38)
- Party: Popular Force (since 2020)

Luis Arturo Alegría García (born 3 August 1988) is a Peruvian politician serving as a member of the Congress of the Republic since 2021.

== Legislative career ==
In the 2021 election, Alegría ran for a seat in the Congress of the Republic from the Department of San Martín constituency and was elected.

In October 2023, he was elected as the first vice president of the Congress, a position that was vacated after the death of its predecessor, Hernando Guerra García.

In the 2026 election, Alegría ran for a seat in the Chamber of Deputies, the lower house of the new bicameral congress of Peru, from the Department of San Martín constituency and was elected.
