= Patricia Juárez =

Peruvian lawyer and politician

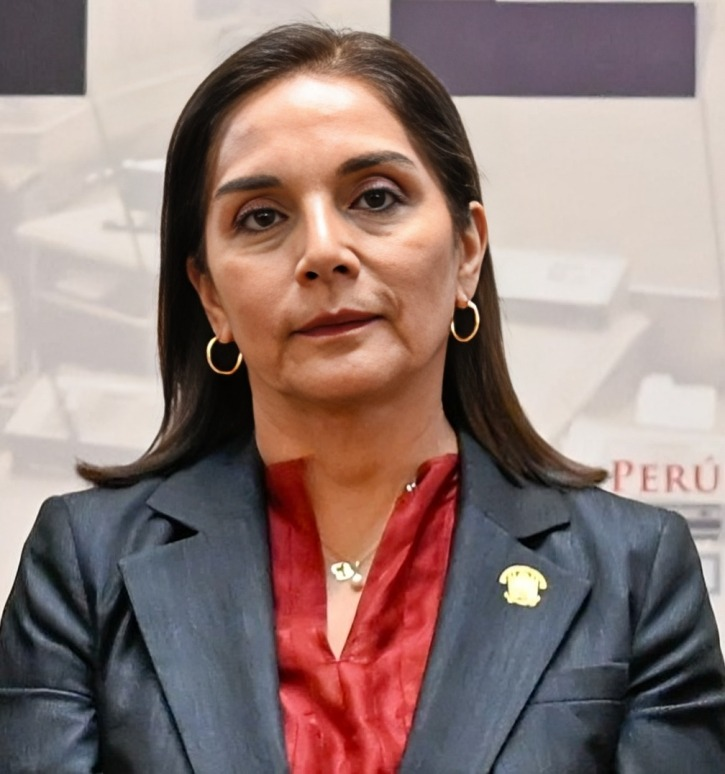

First Vice President of Congress
- In office 27 July 2024 – 26 July 2025
- President: Eduardo Salhuana
- Preceded by: Arturo Alegría
- Succeeded by: Fernando Rospigliosi

Senator of the Republic
- Incumbent
- Assumed office 26 July 2026
- Constituency: Lima

Member of Congress
- In office 27 July 2021 – 26 July 2026
- Constituency: Lima
Legislative offices
Chair of the Congressional Constitution and Regulation Committee
In office 17 August 2021 – 17 August 2022
| Deputy | Gladys Echaíz |
| Preceded by | Luis Valdez Farías |
| Succeeded by | Hernando Guerra García |

Lieutenant Mayor of Lima
- In office 1 January 2015 – 31 December 2018
- Mayor: Luis Castañeda
- Preceded by: Hernán Núñez Gonzales
- Succeeded by: Miguel Romero Sotelo

Personal details
- Born: Carmen Patricia Juárez Gallegos; July 16, 1960 (age 66) Marcona, Ica, Peru
- Party: Popular Force (2020-present)
- Other political affiliations: National Solidarity (2004-2018)
- Spouse: José Danós
- Education: Federico Villarreal National University

Carmen Patricia Juárez Gallegos (born July 16, 1960) is a Peruvian lawyer and politician. She served as a member of the Lima City Council during the period 2015–2018 and elected Congresswoman of the Republic for the parliamentary period 2021–2026.

== Biography ==
She was born in Ica on July 16, 1960.

She completed his primary studies at the Fiscalized School N ° 1897 - Marcona and the secondary ones at the San José de Ica School.

She studied law at the Federico Villarreal National University.

She was Manager of Defense of the Citizen (2008–2010), Sub-Secretary of the Council (2005–2008) and Sub-Manager of Support to Commissions of Councilors (2003–2005).

She is married to José Danós.

== Political career ==
She was a member of the National Solidarity Party from 2004 until her resignation in 2018. Within the party, Juárez was National Secretary of Politics.

Her political career began in the 2011 general election, where she was a candidate for the Congress of the Republic for the National Solidarity Alliance, however, she was not elected. In 2013, she was one of the main spokespersons for the campaign for "Yes" in the recall of the councilors and the mayor of Lima.

=== Councilor of Lima (2015–2018) ===
In the municipal elections of 2014, she was elected Councilor of Lima of National Solidarity for the municipal period 2015–2018. In addition, Juárez also served as Deputy Mayor from 2015 until the end of the municipal government of Luis Castañeda Lossio in 2018.

In 2018, Juárez surprisingly resigned from the National Solidarity Party. She never officially declared the reason for her resignation.

She had rapprochements with the Let's Go Peru party in 2020, however, in October 2020, in a video shown on Keiko Fujimori's Twitter account, it was announced that she would be part of Popular Force with the message "Patricia Juárez joins to our Government Plan team".

=== 2nd vice president candidate, elected Congresswoman ===
For the general elections of 2021, Juárez announced her candidacy for the 2nd Vice Presidency of the Republic on the presidential roster of Keiko Fujimori by Popular Force. In the same elections, Juárez was instead elected Congresswoman of the Republic of Popular Force, with 40,130 votes, for the parliamentary period 2021–2026. She would join the Madrid Forum of the far-right Spanish political party Vox, an international alliance comprising right-wing and far-right individuals.
