= Fernando Rospigliosi =

Peruvian politician (born 1947)

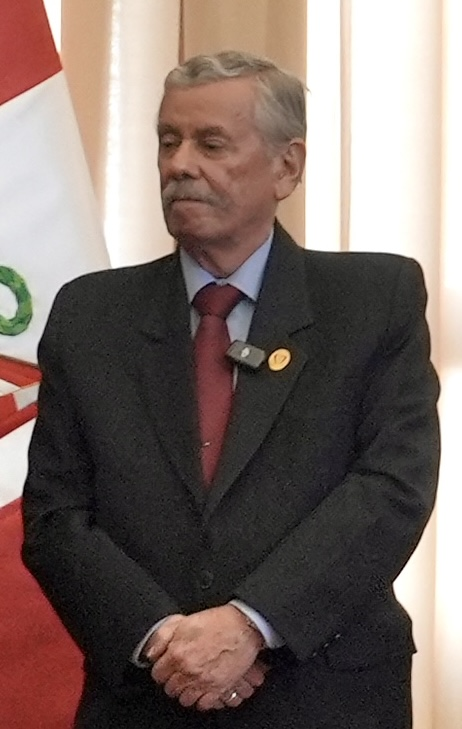
- Rospigliosi in 2026

President of Congress
- Acting; 10 October 2025 (Note: José María Balcázar took the presidency of Congress on 18 February 2026. However, he immediately ascended into the presidency, on leave since then. Rospigliosi continued serving as the acting president of Congress.) – 26 July 2026
- Vice President: 1st Vice President; Himself; 2nd Vice President; Waldemar Cerrón; 3rd Vice President; Ilich López
- Preceded by: José Jerí
- Succeeded by: Miki Torres (Note: as President of the Senate of Peru, Torres ex-officio serves as the President of the Congress of the Republic); Óscar de Jesús Reto (Note: as President of the Chamber of Deputies)
Other offices
First Vice President of Congress
In office 27 July 2025 – 26 July 2026
President	José Jerí; Himself (acting); José María Balcázar; Himself (acting)
Preceded by	Patricia Juárez
Succeeded by	Alejandro Muñante (as First Vice President of the Senate); Analí Márquez (as First Vice President of the Chamber of Deputies)
Minister of the Interior
In office 25 July 2003 – 7 May 2004
President	Alejandro Toledo
Prime Minister	Beatriz Merino; Carlos Ferrero
Preceded by	Alberto Sanabria Ortiz
Succeeded by	Javier Reátegui
In office 28 July 2001 – 12 July 2002
President	Alejandro Toledo
Prime Minister	Roberto Dañino
Preceded by	Ketín Vidal
Succeeded by	Gino Costa

Senator of the Republic
- Incumbent
- Assumed office 27 July 2026
- Constituency: National

Member of Congress
- In office 5 October 2023 – 26 July 2026
- Preceded by: Hernando Guerra García
- Constituency: Lima

Personal details
- Born: Fernando Miguel Rospigliosi Capurro; 25 February 1947 (age 79) Lima, Peru
- Party: FP (since 2020)
- Other political affiliations: VR (1968–1980); PP (2001–2004); PPK (2016–2019)

Fernando Miguel Rospigliosi Capurro (born 25 February 1947) is a Peruvian politician who has served as the acting president of Congress from 2025 until 2026. He previously served as Minister of Interior from 2001 to 2002 and again from 2003 to 2004.

== Early life ==
Rospigliosi was born on 25 February 1947 in Lima.

== Political career ==
Rospigliosi served as Minister of Interior from 2001 to 2002 and again from 2003 to 2004. He became the first vice president of Congress with José Jerí's election to the presidency of Congress for the 2025-2026 period.

=== President of Congress (2025–2026) ===
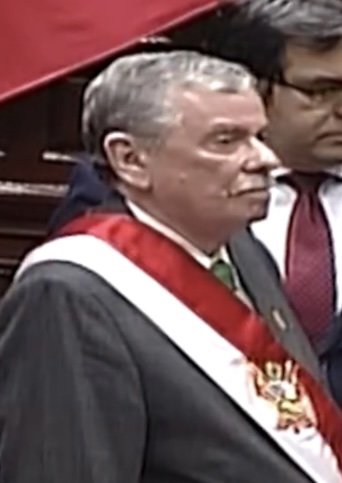
Rospigliosi, before handing the presidential sash to José Jerí, the new President of Peru (2025)

On 10 October 2025, President Dina Boluarte was impeached and removed from office, with both vice presidents vacant; the president of Congress, José Jerí, ascended to the presidency of the republic. Rospigliosi, as first vice president, became the interim president of Congress.

On 17 February 2026, President José Jerí was censured and removed from office. Based on the Peru presidential line of succession, with Rospigliosi's interim status, he cannot directly assume office, leaving everyone in the line of succession vacant.

In this case, a new president of Congress will be elected and subsequently become the President of Peru. Rospigliosi declined to run for the presidency; instead, as acting president, he hosted the election of the presidency of Congress the next day.

As a result, José María Balcázar was elected as the president of Congress, and subsequently became the President-elect of Peru; Balcázar assumed the presidency later the same day, while Rospigliosi continued to lead the Congress of the Republic until the end of the 2021-2026 term period.

=== Post-presidency ===
He was elected to the Senate of Peru for the nationwide constituency following the 2026 Peruvian general election. He became the first secretary of the Congressional Preparatory Board before the new Congress was sworn in.

== Notes ==
Political offices
Preceded by José Jerí; José María Balcázar (de jure)	President of Congress (a.i.); 2025–2026	Succeeded by Miki Torres as President of the Senate and President of Congress; Óscar de Jesús Reto as President of the Chamber of Deputies
Preceded by Patricia Juárez	First Vice President of Congress; 2025–2026	Succeeded by Alejandro Muñante as First Vice President of the Senate; Analí Márquez as First Vice President of the Chamber of Deputies
Preceded by Alberto Sanabria Ortiz	Minister of the Interior; 2003–2004	Succeeded by Javier Reátegui
Preceded by Ketín Vidal	Minister of the Interior; 2001–2002	Succeeded by Gino Costa
