= Patricia Chirinos =

Peruvian politician

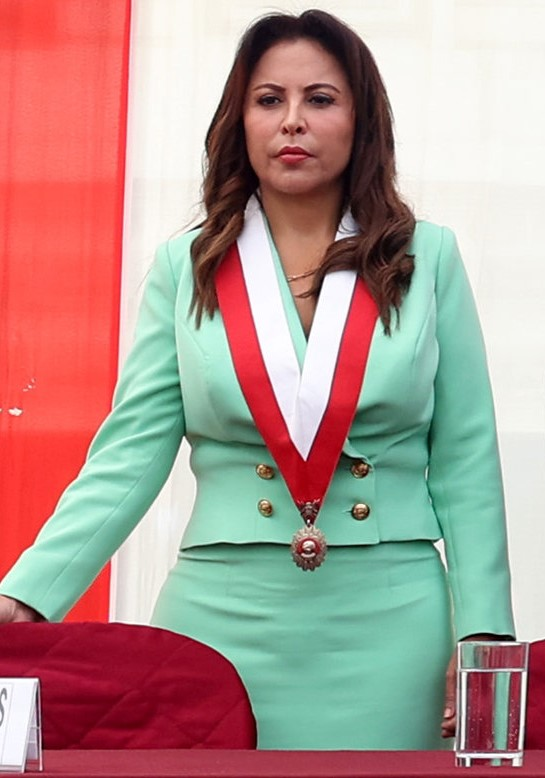

Member of Congress
- In office 27 July 2021 – 26 July 2026
- Constituency: Callao

Third Vice President of Congress
- In office 26 July 2021 – 26 July 2022
- President: Maricarmen Alva
- Preceded by: Matilde Fernández
- Succeeded by: Wilmar Elera

Mayor of La Perla
- In office 1 January 2015 – 31 December 2018
- Preceded by: Pedro López Barrios
- Succeeded by: Aníbal Jara Aguirre

Callao Regional Councilwoman from La Perla
- In office 1 January 2011 – 31 December 2014
- Governor: Félix Moreno Caballero
- Succeeded by: Oscar Araujo Sánchez

Callao Provincial Councilwoman
- In office 1 January 2007 – 31 December 2010

Personal details
- Born: Patricia Rosa Chirinos Venegas; July 19, 1975 (age 51) Callao, Peru
- Party: Popular Renewal (2024-present); Go on Country (2020-2024); Chim Pum Callao Independent Movement (2014-2019)
- Spouse: Luis León Rupp (2019–2020)
- Children: Santiago, Cayetana
- Parent: Enrique Chirinos Soto
- Education: University of Lima (BA)

Patricia Rosa Chirinos Venegas (born July 19, 1975) is a Peruvian journalist and politician. She was Regional Councilor of Callao (2011–2014), District Mayor of La Perla (2015–2018) and is currently a Congresswoman of the Republic for the parliamentary period 2021–2026.

== Biography ==
She was born in Callao on July 19, 1975. She is the daughter of the constitutional lawyer and politician Enrique Chirinos Soto.

She completed his primary studies at Colegio Santa Martha and secondary studies at Colegio América, both in Callao.

Between 1995 and 2000, she studied journalism at the University of Lima, after which she worked as a producer and journalist in various media.

She married Peruvian millionaire Luis León Rupp, who died in 2020.

== Political career ==
=== Councilor of Callao (2006–2010) ===
In the municipal elections of 2006, she was elected councilor of the Municipality of Callao for the period 2006–2010.

=== Regional Councilor of Callao (2011–2014) ===
In 2011, she was elected Regional Councilor of Callao for the period 2011–2014.

=== District Mayor of La Perla (2015–2018) ===
In the municipal elections of 2014, she was elected Mayor of La Perla by the Independent Movement Chim Pum Callao, thus becoming the first woman to be Mayor of said district, for the period 2015–2018.

=== Congresswoman (2021–2026) ===
For the general elections of 2021, she was a member of the political team of the presidential candidate Hernando de Soto from Go on Country – Social Integration Party and also ran for Congress on behalf of Callao, being elected Congresswoman of the Republic for the parliamentary period 2021–2026.

On July 26, 2021, Chirinos was elected 3rd Vice President of Congress under the presidency of Maria del Carmen Alva for the legislative period 2021–2022.
