= Maricarmen Alva =

Peruvian politician (born 1967)

Maricarmen Alva OSP
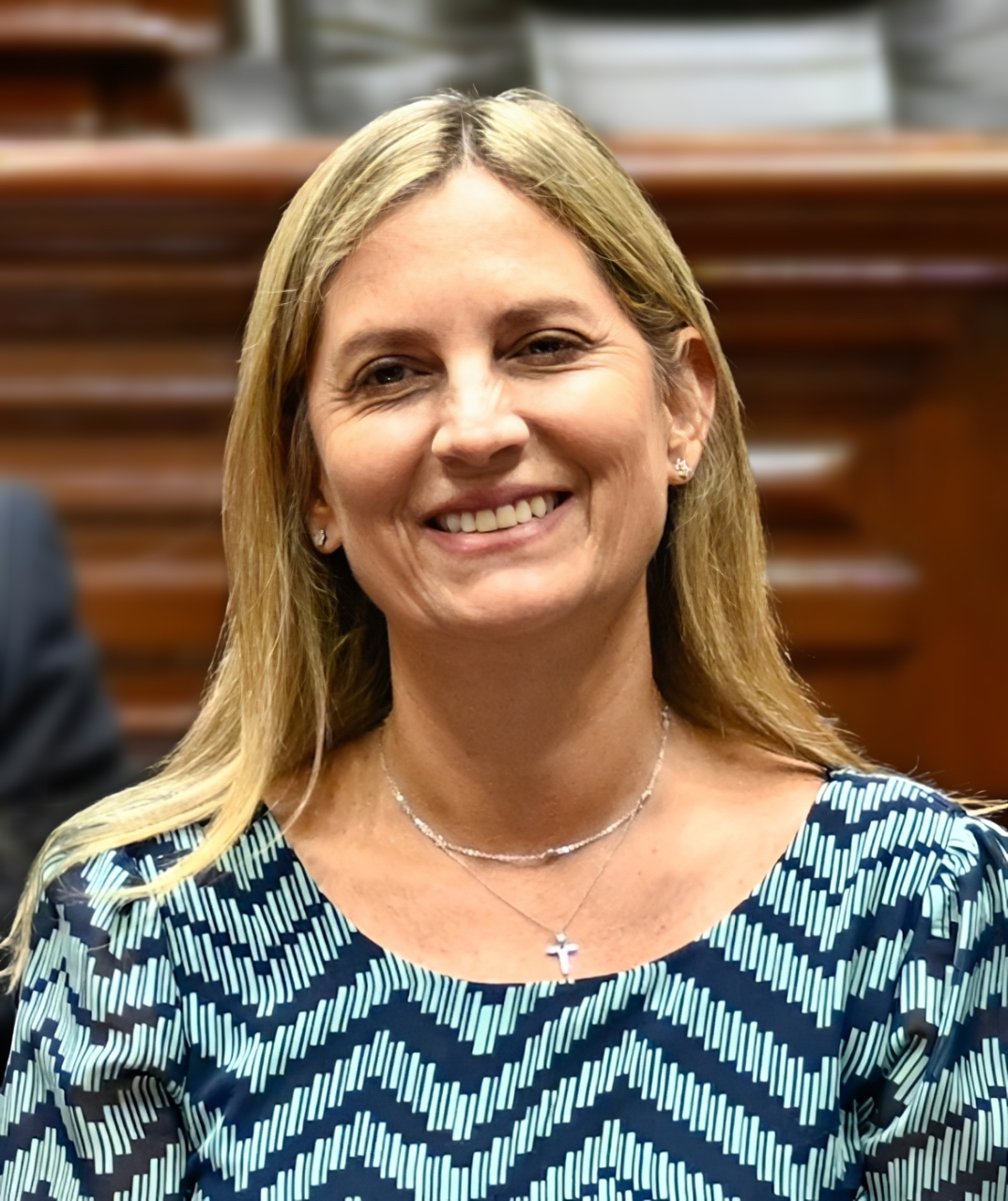
- Alva in 2025

President of Congress
- In office 27 July 2021 – 26 July 2022
- Vice President: 1st Vice President; Lady Camones; 2nd Vice President; Enrique Wong; 3rd Vice President; Patricia Chirinos
- Preceded by: Mirtha Vásquez (a.i.)
- Succeeded by: Lady Camones

Member of Congress
- In office 27 July 2021 – 26 July 2026
- Constituency: Lima

Personal details
- Born: María del Carmen Alva Prieto; 24 February 1967 (age 59) Lima, Peru
- Party: Popular Action
- Relatives: Javier Alva (uncle)
- Education: University of Lima; University of San Martín de Porres
- Occupation: Lawyer, politician

María del Carmen Alva Prieto (born 24 February 1967) is a Peruvian lawyer and politician who served as the president of the Congress of the Republic of Peru from 26 July 2021 until 26 July 2022, and a member of the Congress representing Lima. She is a member of Popular Action.

== Early life ==
Alva was born in Lima on 24 February 1967 and is a daughter Miguel Alva Orlandini, brother of a former congressman and historic leader of the Popular Action Javier Alva Orlandini. Her grandfather, José Felipe Alva y Alva was senator for Cajamarca.

She studied law at the University of Lima where she graduated as a lawyer. She obtained a master's degree in Public Management at the Government Institute of the University of San Martín de Porres.

== Career ==
She was a parliamentary coordinator and lawyer of the Legal Management of the Social Security Normalization Office. Additionally, she was a legal advisor at the Ministry of Labour and Promotion of Employment.

For the 2006 general elections, she was a member of the Government Plan Commission on public management issues for the presidential candidacy of Valentín Paniagua. In those elections, Alva began her political career running for the Congress of the Republic for the Frente de Centro. However, she was not elected.

In the 2010 Lima municipal elections, she was elected councilor of Santa María del Mar for Popular Action. And also deputy mayor, during the administration of Viviana Roda Scheuch, for the municipal period 2010-2014. In the 2020 parliamentary elections, she tried again to run for Congress for Popular Action, but was not elected again.

=== Congress of Peru ===
==== President of Congress ====
In the 2021 general elections, Alva was elected congresswoman of the republic for Acción Popular, with 25,219 votes, for the 2021-2026 parliamentary term. On July 26, 2021, Alva was elected president of the Congress of the Republic for the 2021-2022 legislative period. As a congresswoman, she defended bills perceived as unfavourable to workers, including the extension of the workday, provisions facilitating layoffs, or the rejection of social security projects. She fought against President Pedro Castillo, seeking his impeachment and received a constitutional complaint by Minister of Labor Betssy Chávez, who accused her of leading a criminal organization engaged in alleged attempts to overthrow his government. El Búho wrote "her expressions and behavior have often been considered racist, petulant and even violent" and noted that Alva stated that every member of congress should "get preferential treatment."

During her tenure, Congress faced corruption investigations for purchasing 350 new computers at twice their market value, costing millions of soles. Alva said that her office was not involved with the purchase of the computers.

==== Post-presidency ====
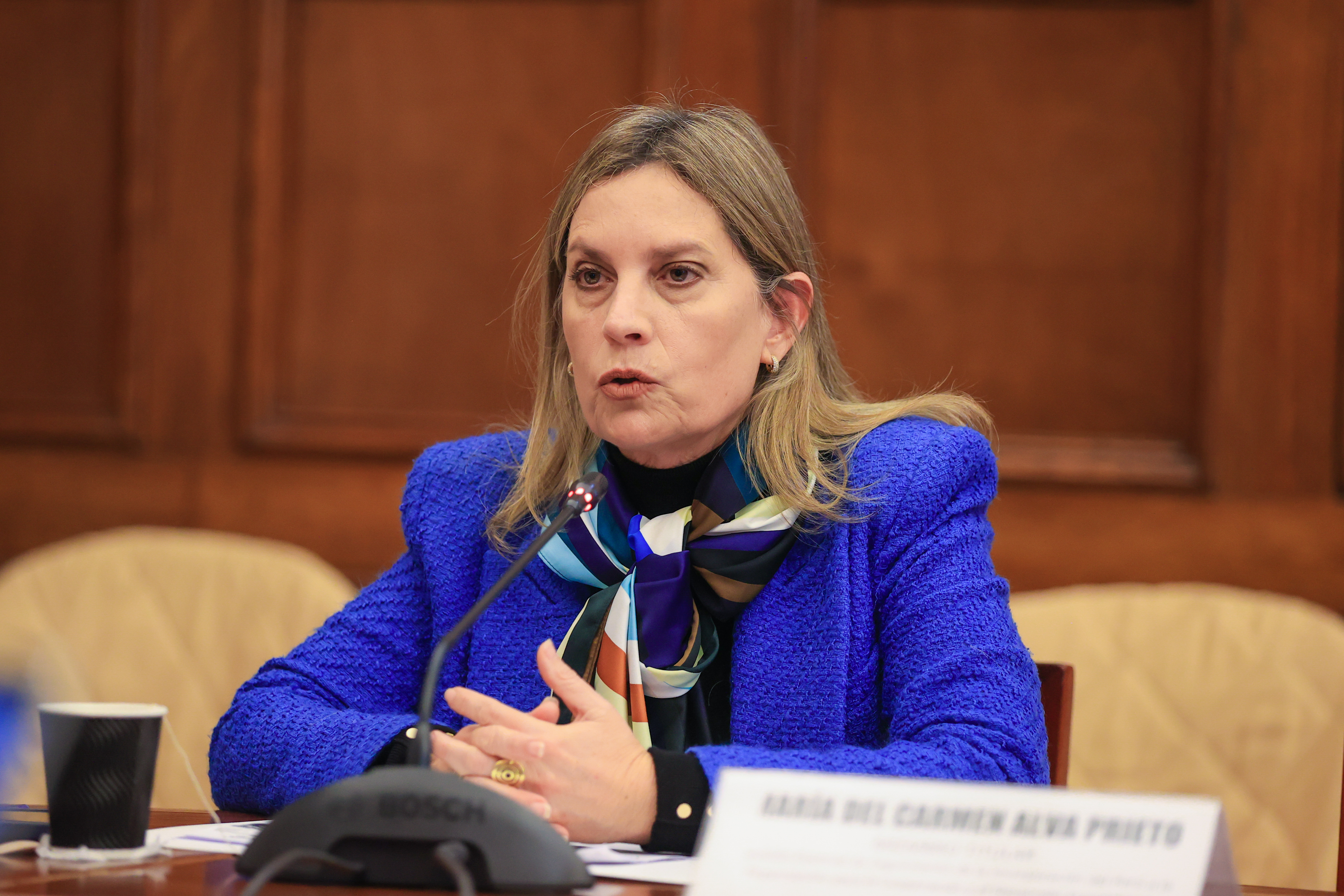
Alva in 2025

Alva verbally and physically attacked Congresswoman Isabel Cortez of Together for Peru during a session in parliament on 11 August 2022. Cortez, a former city cleaner of indigenous descent, had moved from her seat during a discussion among some parliamentarians following statements made by Norma Yarrow of the far-right Renovación Popular party (an ally of Alva's party, Acción Popular) accusing the Castillo government of "selling itself for a plate of lentils", which caused an outcry and uproar among parliamentarians. Cortez approached the seat where Alva's colleague Wilson Soto was sitting, with several congressmen also around him. When she came face to face with Alva, after a dialogue, the latter violently pulled and squeezed Cortez's arm and threatened her. They were gently separated from each other by the timely intervention of Congressman Ernesto Bustamante, who had crossed to their side of the parliament floor to prevent further interaction. After receiving strong condemnation for the incident, Alva had to apologise for her "inappropriate reaction", while the Cambio Democrático (Juntos por el Perú) party called for her to be sanctioned. On the same day, it was also revealed that Alva had racistly insulted Congressman Ilich López by calling him a "fucking Indian". The insult was due to Alva's failure to be elected President of Foreign Relations. In addition, López stated that Alva "[said] that he was going to destroy us and our families, that we were going to shed tears of blood", in reference to a group of parliamentarians from the Popular Action party who were meeting secretly with President Castillo. López also revealed that Alva was very upset at the meeting that took place for the vote, banging on the door of the room and swearing.

Following the removal of Pedro Castillo from the presidency, Alva defended his successor Dina Boluarte following her crackdown on widespread protests, saying in March 2023 that groups were attempting to impede Boluarte from her functions and criticized those who sought Boluarte's removal from office through vacancy due to moral incapacity, stating "massacres do not warrant a vacancy." Infobae noted that Alva's comment occurred after over a dozen people were killed in a single day in the Juliaca massacre. Alva later defended her statement that "massacres do not warrant a vacancy", criticized the Inter-American Commission on Human Rights report on violence against protesters and said that the report was untruthful, defending the response by authorities while saying demonstrators were engaged in "terrorist acts."

On 9 June 2023, Alva again was involved in an altercation in which she was seen physically shaking Congresswoman Francis Paredes, from the Podemos Perú group and representative for Ucayali, in order to change her vote in favor of the return to bicameralism in the Congress of the Republic.

Alva was awarded the Grand Cross of the Order of the Sun of Peru by congress on 14 June 2023. A portrait of Alva painted by César Yaury Huanay was also commissioned at a cost of 9,000 soles.

In July 2023, audio leaked of Popular Action congressman Jorge Luis Flores Ancachi stating that he demanded his staff to provided 10% of their regular pay and 50% of their bonus pay to him, saying that this was known by Alva and that she allegedly said that congressional staff were "ungrateful." Following the leak, Alva called for the removal of Flores from his position, saying "the aforementioned congressman spoke about me, defaming me and accusing me of having insinuated that he appropriates salaries." Flores maintained his position in congress, leaving Popular Action to join Podemos Perú and later joining César Acuña's Alliance for Progress.

==== Attempted presidential run ====
On 18 February 2026, following the censure and removal of President José Jerí, Maricarmen was nominated by Popular Action for President of Congress and for the presidency of Peru, receiving support from Fujimorists of Popular Force. However in the final ballot, she lost to José María Balcázar of Free Peru.

== Political positions ==
Alva has been described as holding right wing to far-right political positions. Internationally, she has participated in Madrid Forum events hosted by the far-right Spanish political party Vox.

== Personal life ==
Alva is married and has three sons. She lives with her family in the affluent La Molina District towards the outskirts of Lima.

== Honours ==
Awards and orders	Country	Date	Notes
Grand Cross of the Order of the Sun of Peru	Peru	14 June 2023	
