= Lady Camones =

Peruvian politician

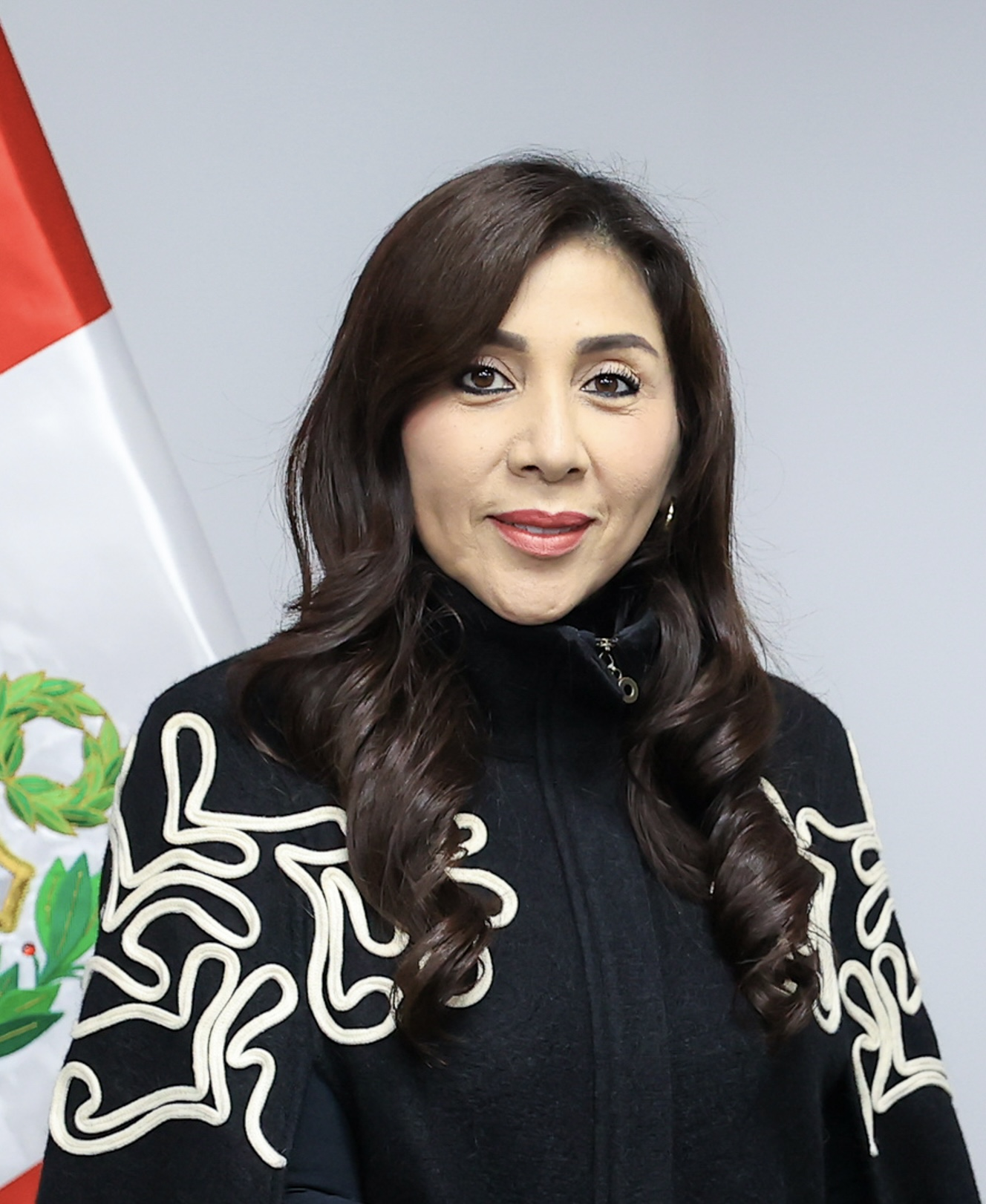
- Official portrait, 2025

President of Congress
- In office 27 July 2022 – 5 September 2022
- Vice President: 1st Vice President; Martha Moyano; 2nd Vice President; Digna Calle; 3rd Vice President; Wilmar Elera; Alejandro Muñante
- Preceded by: Maricarmen Alva
- Succeeded by: Martha Moyano (a.i.)

First Vice President of Congress
- In office 27 July 2021 – 26 July 2022
- President: Maricarmen Alva
- Preceded by: Mirtha Vásquez
- Succeeded by: Martha Moyano

Member of Congress
- In office 27 July 2021 – 26 July 2026
- Constituency: Áncash

Personal details
- Born: Lady Mercedes Camones Soriano; February 20, 1975 (age 51) Chimbote, Áncash, Peru
- Party: Alliance for Progress
- Other political affiliations: Popular Force (2018)
- Education: Antenor Orrego Private University (LLB); César Vallejo University

Lady Mercedes Camones Soriano (Chimbote, born February 20, 1975) is a Peruvian lawyer and politician. She was elected Congresswoman of the Republic for the period 2021-2026.

== Biography ==
She was born in Chimbote on February 20, 1975. She studied at the Antenor Orrego Private University (UPAO), where she obtained a bachelor's degree in law. She also studied a master's degree in public administration at the César Vallejo University, although she left it unfinished.

She was regional head of National Registry of Identification and Civil Status from 2003 to 2018.

== Political career ==
=== Candidate for the Presidency of Áncash in 2018 ===
Her political career began in the 2018 regional and municipal elections where she ran for the Regional Governorship of Áncash with Popular Force. However, she was not elected.

=== Congresswoman (2021-2026) ===
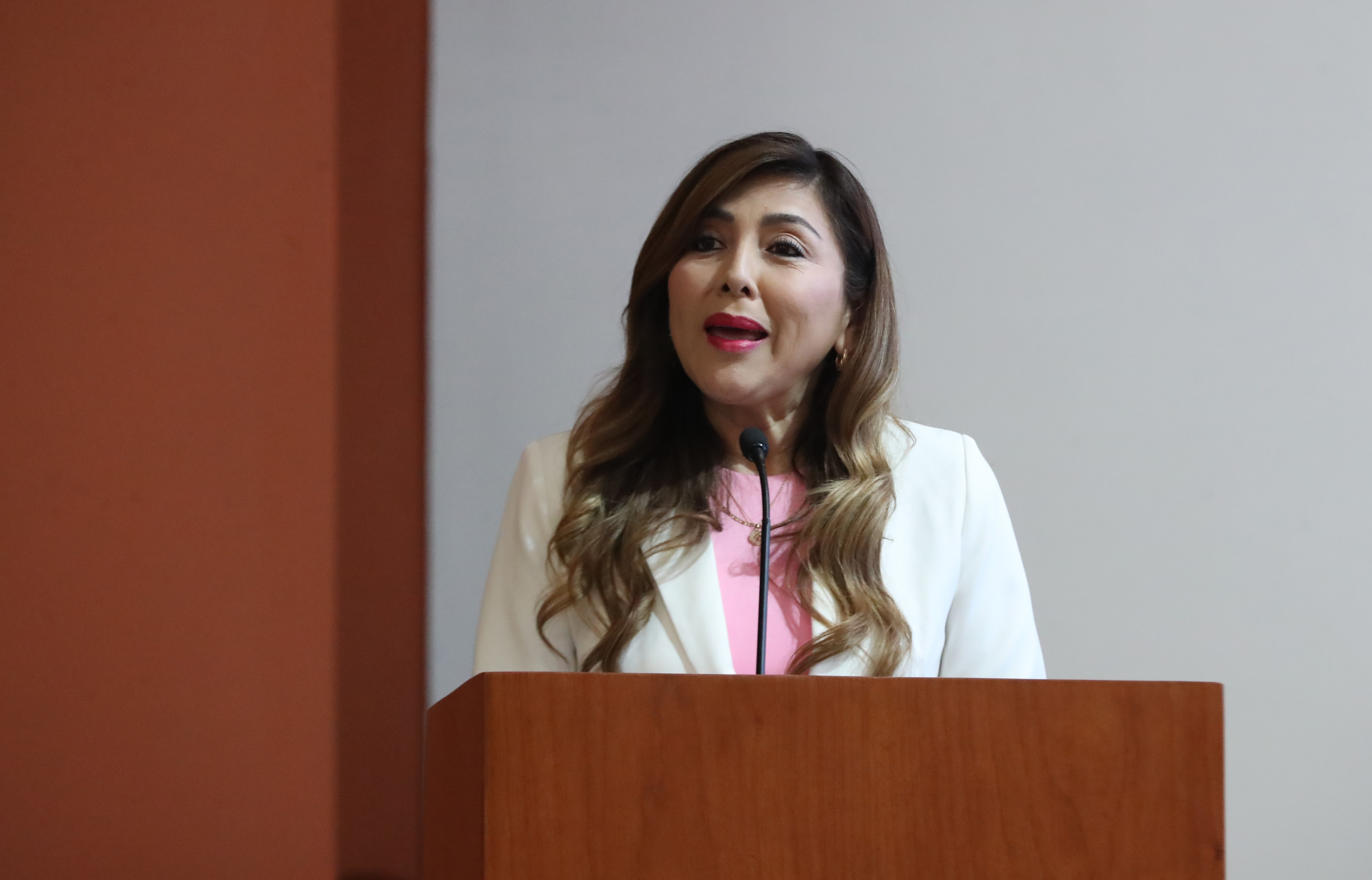
Camones in 2023

In the general elections of 2021, she was elected to the Peruvian Congress for Áncash with Alliance for Progress. She garnered 6203 votes for the parliamentary period 2021-2026.

On July 26, 2021, Camones was elected first vice president of Congress under the presidency of María del Carmen Alva for the legislative period 2021-2022.

One year later, after a series of parliamentary deals among the opposition caucuses, Camones was elected President of Congress, on July 26, 2022.

On September 2, 2022, illegal audio recordings between Camones and her party leader, César Acuña, discussing on bills favoring the latter's 2022 governorship run, were revealed by the press. Facing public outcry, Camones was censured and removed as President of Congress by the Peruvian Congress on September 5, 2022 by a vote of 61-47 and 5 abstentions.
