= Waldemar Cerrón =

Spokesman for the Free Peru party

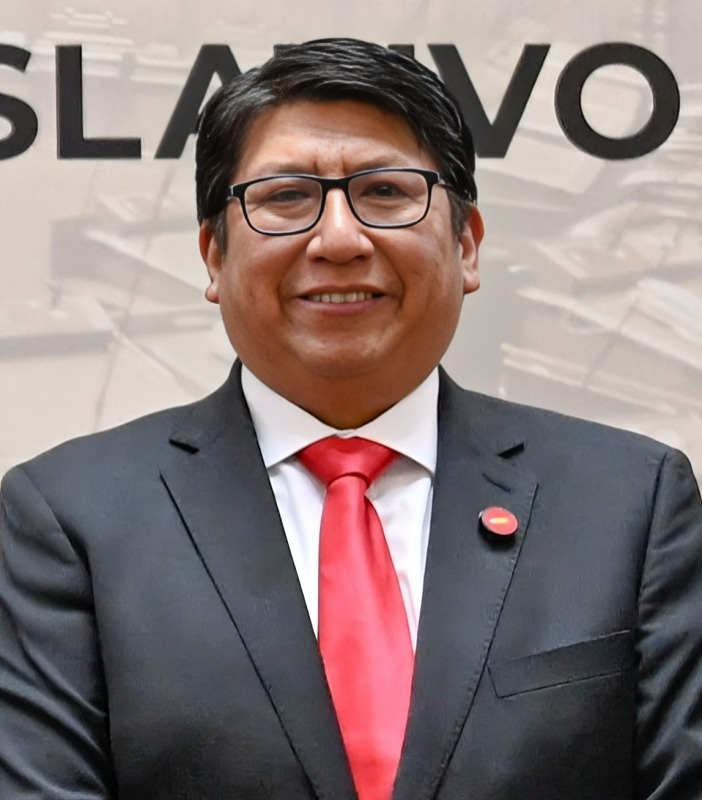
- Cerrón in 2024

Second Vice President of Congress
- In office 26 July 2023 – 26 July 2026
- President: Alejandro Soto Reyes; Eduardo Salhuana; José Jerí; Fernando Rospigliosi; José María Balcázar; Fernando Rospigliosi
- Preceded by: Silvia Monteza
- Succeeded by: Nilza Chacón (as Second Vice President of the Senate); Harvey Colchado (as Second Vice President of the Chamber of Deputies)

Parliamentary Spokesman for Free Peru
- Incumbent
- Assumed office 2 August 2021
- General Secretary: Vladimir Cerrón
- Preceded by: Álex Paredes

Member of Congress
- In office 27 July 2021 – 26 July 2026
- Constituency: Junín

Personal details
- Born: 19 March 1972 (age 54) Chupaca, Junín, Peru
- Party: Free Peru
- Other political affiliations: Socialist Party (2007)
- Relatives: Vladimir Cerrón (brother)
- Education: National University of the Center of Peru

Waldemar José Cerrón Rojas (born 19 March 1972) is a Peruvian professor and a politician.

== Biography ==
Cerrón was born on 19 March 1972 in Chupaca, Junín. He is the son of Jaime Cerrón Palomino and Bertha Rojas López, two university professors. His brother is politician Vladimir Cerrón. Cerrón is licensed to teach both pedagogy and humanities. He received a doctorate in the educational sciences at the National University of the Center of Peru.

== Political career ==
Cerrón joined the Socialist Party in 2007. In 2008, he was one of the founders of the Free Peru party, where he was the national economic secretary. After Free Peru member and congressman Álex Paredes González retired, Cerrón was elected as the spokesman of the party.

After Pedro Castillo attempted to dissolve congress Waldemar Cerrón stayed quiet in the immediate aftermath, although he did vote to remove Castillo, and later voiced support for Dina Boluarte. In March 2023, Cerrón introduced a bill which proposed that preventive detention be limited to only 12 months, which was seen by some as an attempt to free Castillo, who was in prison for 12 months.

=== As a congressman ===
In the 2021 Peruvian general election, Cerrón was elected to the Congress of the Republic of Peru with 25,281 votes. Cerrón criticized Pedro Castillo's cabinet, with Mirtha Vásquez as the president of the Council of Ministers.

== Money laundering ==
An investigation was opened in April 2021 into Waldemar Cerrón and his brothers Vladimir and Fritz's finances, specifically looking for evidence of money laundering. Waldemar and Vladimir were found guilty, being sentenced to four years in prison. They stand accused of accepting money for an airport without government authorization. They escaped to an unknown location, with Interpol releasing a Blue notice. Waldemar joked on social media that "they won't capture me in Peru".

Party political offices
Preceded by Álex Paredes	Parliamentary Spokesman for Free Peru; 2021–present	Incumbent
