= Rosselli Amuruz =

Peruvian politician (born 1987)

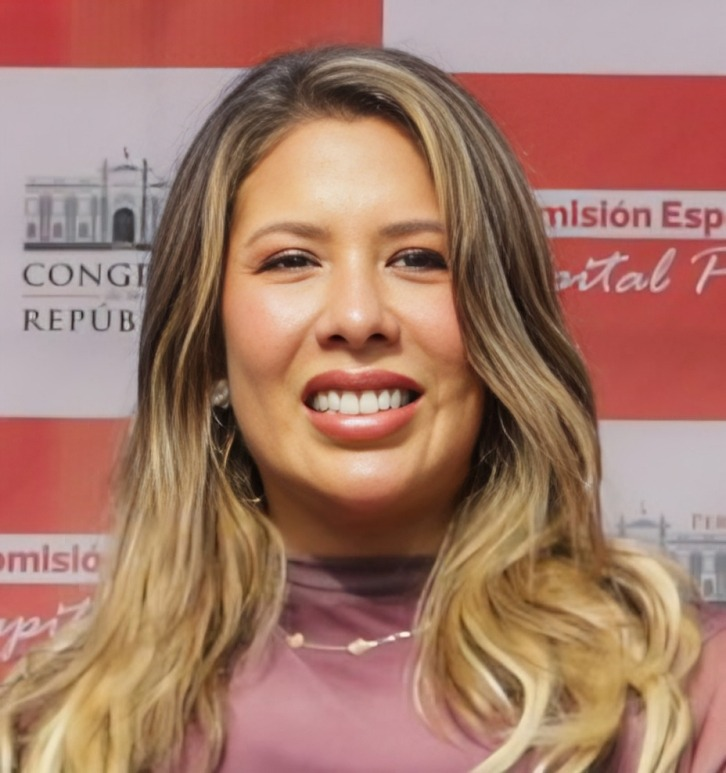

Member of Congress
- In office 27 July 2021 – 26 July 2026
- Constituency: Lima

Personal details
- Born: 18 August 1987 (age 39)
- Party: Go on Country – Social Integration Party (since 2020)
- Spouse: Paul García (m. 2024)
- Parent: Roger Amuruz (father)

Yessica Rosselli Amuruz Dulanto (born 18 August 1987) is a Peruvian politician serving as a member of the Congress of the Republic since 2021. From 2023 to 2024, she served as third vice president of the congress.
