= 2026 Peruvian general election =

- Presidential election
- 12–13 April 2026 (first round); 7 June 2026 (second round)
- Opinion polls
- Registered: 27,325,432
- Turnout: 73.81% (first round) ▲3.76pp 72.03% (second round) ▼2.54pp

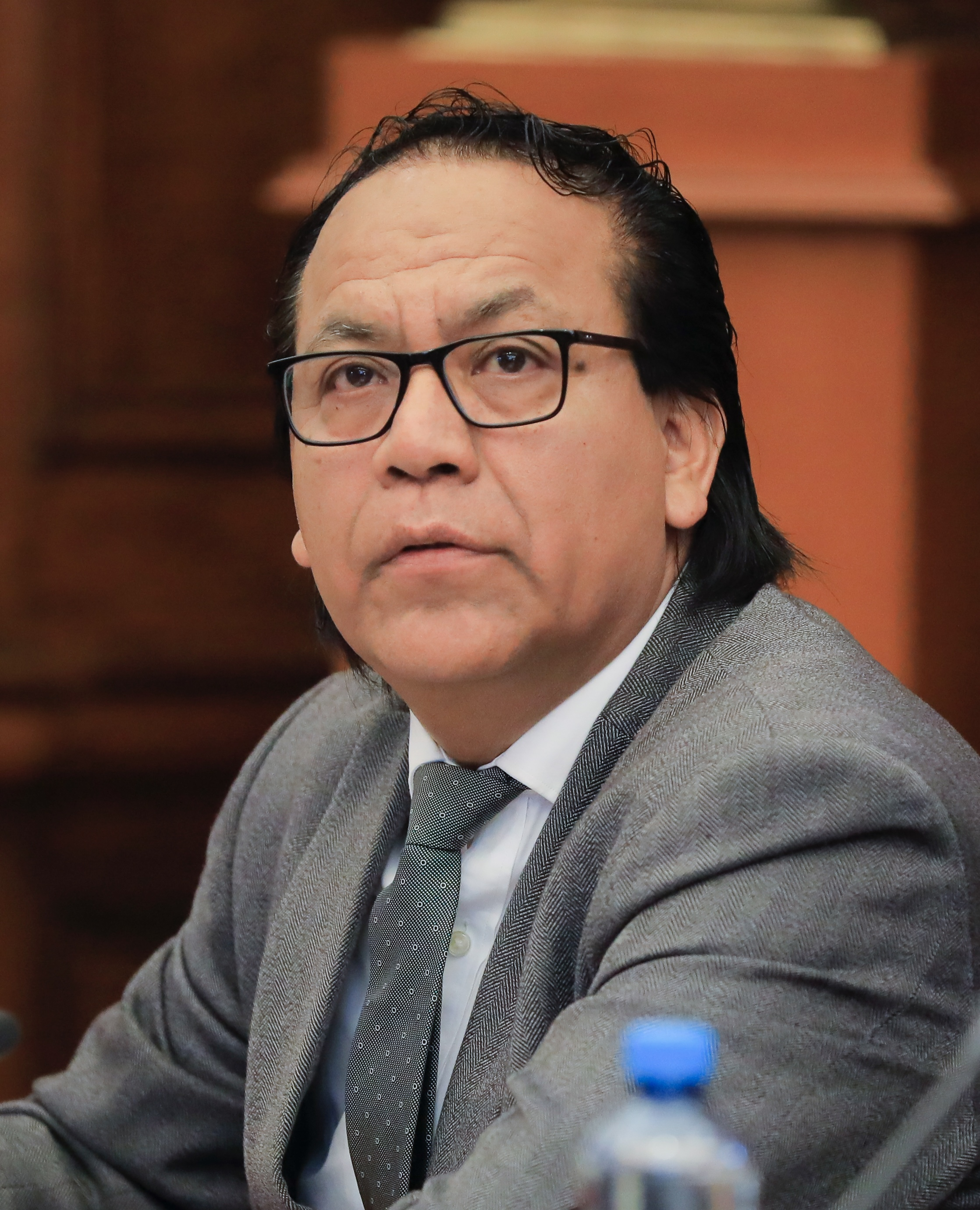
Candidate	Keiko Fujimori	Roberto Sánchez
Party	FP	JP
Running mate	Luis Galarreta; Miki Torres	Analí Márquez; Brígida Curo
Popular vote	9,223,396	9,173,755
Percentage	50.13%	49.87%
President before election
José María Balcázar
Independent
Elected President
Keiko Fujimori
FP
- Senate
- 12–13 April 2026
- All 60 seats in the Senate; 31 seats needed for a majority
Party	Leader	Vote %	Seats
FP	Keiko Fujimori	15.06	22
JP	Roberto Sánchez	12.23	14
RP	Rafael López Aliaga	11.04	8
PBG	Jorge Nieto	10.48	7
OBRAS	Ricardo Belmont	8.84	5
AN	Alfonso López-Chau	8.18	4
This lists parties that won seats. See the complete results below.
Result by departments
- Chamber of Deputies
- 12–13 April 2026
- All 130 seats in the Chamber of Deputies; 66 seats needed for a majority
Party	Leader	Vote %	Seats	+/–
FP	Keiko Fujimori	14.66	41	+17
JP	Roberto Sánchez	10.77	32	+27
PBG	Jorge Nieto	10.47	18	New
RP	Rafael López Aliaga	11.04	15	+2
OBRAS	Ricardo Belmont	8.32	14	New
AN	Alfonso López-Chau	8.49	10	New
This lists parties that won seats. See the complete results below.
Result by departments

General elections were held in Peru from 12 to 13 April 2026 to elect the president, vice presidents, and the Congress of the Republic of Peru. As no presidential candidate achieved a majority of votes in the first round, a runoff election was held on 7 June. In the second round, the leader of the Popular Force, Keiko Fujimori, defeated Together for Peru nominee Roberto Sánchez. The congressional elections determined the composition of the Congress of Peru, which returned to being a bicameral legislature with a Senate (the first since the 1990 election) and a Chamber of Deputies.

The elections come after proposals to hold them earlier due to the 2022–2023 Peruvian protests were rejected. In the first round, Fujimori, a far-right politician, placed first. Sánchez, a left-wing psychologist and politician, placed second, narrowly surpassing far-right businessman Rafael López Aliaga. Due to delays in various polling stations, election authorities extended voting by one day for voters unable to cast their ballots. Following Sánchez's rise in votes later in the tabulation process, López Aliaga reportedly began a disinformation campaign against electoral authorities, accusing the vote-counting process of being fraudulent. Electoral observers from the European Union and Peruvian authorities denied that voting irregularities took place. It was noted that a fringe segment of the Peruvian public believed that the election of Keiko Fujimori (who was born and raised in Peru, as were both of her parents) was a conspiracy concocted by the Japanese government to subjugate Peru and bring it under Japanese influence as a puppet state. López Aliaga faces potential criminal charges related to an alleged incitement of civil disorder after calling for an insurgency. The National Jury of Elections (JNE) ruled that it would not annul the first round of elections and that the runoff election would take place on the scheduled date of 7 June 2026.

One week prior to the 7 June election, electoral authorities suspended the use of a ballot scanning system for international votes, instead choosing to have election material physically transported from foreign consulates to be processed in Peru. While the head of the Organization of American States election monitoring delegation raised some concern about the move, the inter-American body said that the second round proceeded without significant irregularities. After Sánchez initially secured the majority of domestic votes, which were processed first, foreign votes that were largely supportive of Fujimori arrived to be counted in Peru, giving her the lead in the election. Following the modification in foreign vote counting and Fujimori gaining the lead, Sánchez called for foreign ballots to be nullified, saying that irregularities occurred in the process. By late June, international media projected Fujimori's victory. The JNE had counted all votes by 29 June 2026, with Fujimori holding about 50,000 more votes than Sánchez, certifying Fujimori as the election winner.

== Background ==
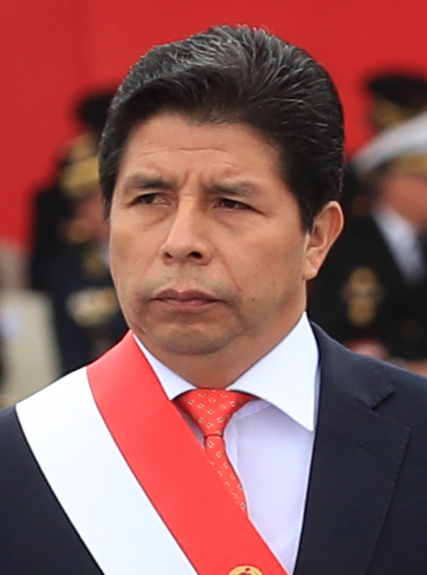
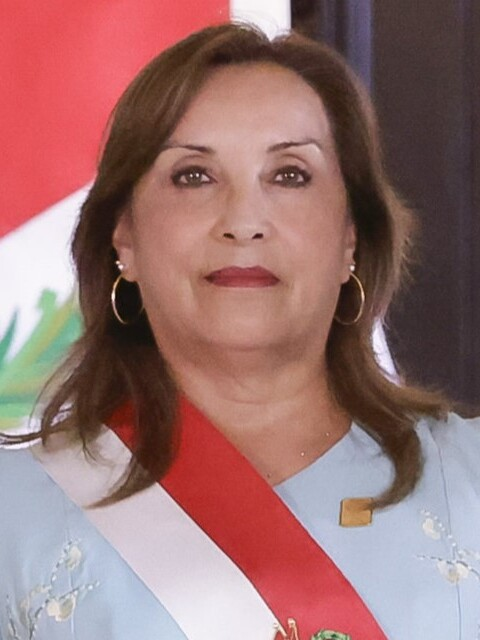
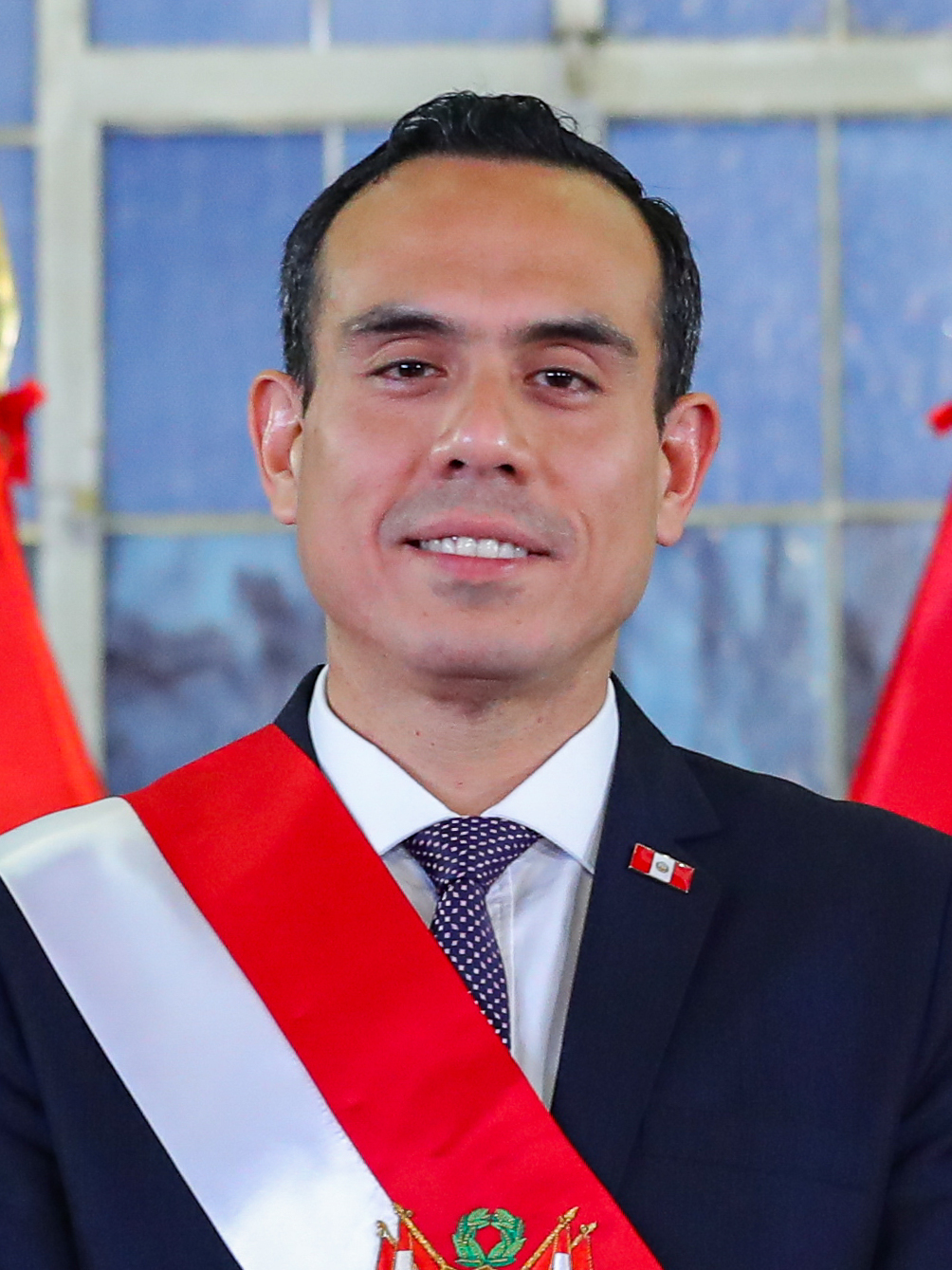
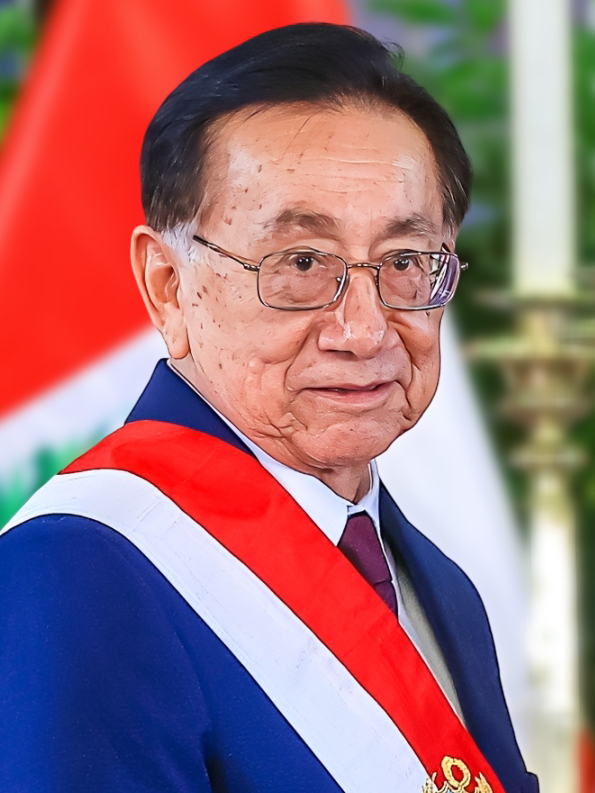
Presidents since the 2021 election in order: Pedro Castillo, Dina Boluarte, José Jerí, José María Balcázar

The election was held after a prolonged period of political instability that began well before the current electoral cycle. During the presidencies of Ollanta Humala, Pedro Pablo Kuczynski and Martín Vizcarra, the Congress was dominated by the opposition Popular Force, the party created by Keiko Fujimori (daughter of former president Alberto Fujimori), and voted to block many of the actions performed by the presidents. Fujimorists in Congress "earned a reputation as hardline obstructionists for blocking initiatives popular with Peruvians aimed at curbing the nation's rampant corruption" according to the Associated Press and since the 2016 Peruvian general election, Popular Force held control of the nation's legislature. During this period, the Fujimorist-led Congress used constitutional hardball against the executive and removed multiple presidents from office, with members of Congress also creating laws that benefitted organized crime while simultaneously obstructing the functions of law enforcement.

Following the 2021 Peruvian general election, right-wing parties, including Avanza País and Popular Renewal, gained control of Congress. After left-wing presidential candidate Pedro Castillo won the presidency, Fujimori and her supporters said electoral fraud had occurred, leading obstructionist efforts to overturn the election with support of citizens in Lima. Many business groups and politicians refused to recognize Castillo's ascent to the presidency, along with those among the more affluent, including former military officers and wealthy families. They demanded new elections, promoted calls for a military coup, and used rhetoric to support their allegations of fraud. From the beginning of his presidency, Castillo was targeted by members of Congress, who made it clear that they wanted to remove him from office by impeachment.

Due to broadly interpreted impeachment wording in the 1993 Constitution of Peru, Congress can impeach the president on the vague grounds of "moral incapacity", effectively making the legislative branch more powerful than the executive branch. Congress, which had already attempted to impeach Castillo twice, began a third process of impeachment in late 2022. On 7 December 2022, Castillo attempted a self-coup, dissolving Congress as well as the Judiciary bodies, imposing a curfew, and establishing an emergency government. He was arguing that the legislative body, which had obstructed many of his policies, was serving oligopolistic businesses and had colluded with the Constitutional Court of Peru to undermine the executive branch, thereby creating a "congressional dictatorship". The move was rejected by state institutions; he was removed from office and arrested. Two months after Castillo was removed, Congress would obtain nearly absolute control of Peru's government when the Constitutional Court, whose members were directly chosen by Congress, removed judicial oversight of the legislative body.

Castillo's vice president, Dina Boluarte, assumed the presidency amid the widespread protests against her government. Following her ascension to the presidency, Boluarte aligned herself with the far right-wing majority in Congress. She was described by analysts as authoritarian due to her crackdown on demonstrations, with human rights groups such as Amnesty International, Human Rights Watch, the Inter-American Commission on Human Rights and the National Coordinator for Human Rights criticizing her administration's response, especially after the Ayacucho and Juliaca massacres. Although proposals were repeatedly introduced to bring forward the scheduled 2026 vote, they were rejected by Boluarte and Congress. In October 2025, Boluarte was removed from office by Congress on "permanent moral incapacity" grounds amid mounting public anger over insecurity and corruption allegations.

In his position in the order of succession, president of Congress José Jerí succeeded Boluarte, initially assumed the presidency leading into the 2026 elections. Jerí became Peru's seventh president in nine years. However, in February 2026, José Jerí was removed from office by Congress for holding undisclosed meetings with Zhihua Yang, a Chinese businessman under scrutiny from the Peruvian government. He was succeeded by José María Balcázar, who was elected by Congress to serve as president of Congress and thus made president of Peru.

The elections have taken shape amid heightened public concern over national security, public safety, organized crime, persistent distrust in political institutions, and ongoing debates about corruption and economic governance. Concerns about the power Congress held over the executive and judiciary branches were also noted by observers, with Will Freeman of the Council on Foreign Relations warning that Congress was attempting to build a "mafia state" in the run-up to the elections. Similarly, Human Rights Watch warned of democratic backsliding occurring, with director of the Americas division, Juanita Goebertus Estrada, stating that "Congress has taken steps to undermine the independence and capacity of courts, prosecutors, and key government institutions" and that "[as] Congress goes unchecked, many Peruvians point to its role in weakening the rule of law as the reason for the expansion of organized crime in the country."

A return to a bicameral legislative system was also established by Congress, overruling the 2018 constitutional referendum where voters voted to maintain a unicameral system, which includes 130 seats for deputies and 60 seats for senators. Congress also reversed the decision of voters who chose in the 2018 referendum to prohibit officeholders from being re-elected. Deputies serve in the lower house, tasked with presenting legislative bills and providing oversight of the Cabinet of Peru, having more responsibility over political objectives. Senators represent the upper house and hold more institutional control; they review bills presented by deputies and are responsible for electing the directors of the Central Reserve Bank of Peru, the members of the Constitutional Court, the Comptroller General, Ombudsman of Peru and other institutional leaders. Upper house senators also hold the power to approve certain functions of the executive, such as foreign travel, and the ability to remove the president. The president also cannot dissolve the upper house of Congress, granting that body a large amount of power.

Since 2025, The Economist has described Peru's political system as "hybrid", and according to the V-Dem Institute, it is "in the process of becoming autocratic".

== Electoral system ==
=== President ===
The president is elected using the two-round system. The first round of voting allows eligible voters to vote for any viable presidential candidate. The top two candidates who receive a plurality of the vote proceed to the run-off election. The winner of the run-off election and the presidential election is the candidate who receives a plurality of the popular vote. However, if in the first round the candidate who is in the first place already gets more than 50% of the popular vote, that candidate will automatically win the election and a run-off election will no longer be needed.

=== Congress and Andean Parliament ===
The 130 members of the Chamber of Deputies are elected in 27 multi-member constituencies using open list proportional representation. Seats are allocated using the D'Hondt method. The 60 senators are elected through two systems, with 30 elected in a single nationwide constituency through proportional representation and 30 elected from the 27 constituencies used for the Chamber of Deputies, with Lima province electing four senators and the other 26 constituencies electing one each. Peru has five seats in the Andean Parliament, which are elected using a common constituency by open list proportional representation.

==== Threshold ====
To gain seats in each chamber, parties must both reach a 5% electoral threshold of valid votes for the chamber at the national level and also qualify for at least 5% of the number of seats of the respective chamber (7 for the chamber of deputies and 3 for the senate). For the senate, the combined vote total for the district and national list senators is used when checking whether a party has reached the threshold.

== Presidential candidates ==
A record number of presidential candidates participated in the first round of elections, with 36 individuals appearing on the initial ballot on 12 and 13 April 2026. The first round ballot itself measured 16.5 inches (42 cm) by 17.3 inches (44 cm), and was described as being the size of a pizza box. Napoleón Becerra of the Workers and Entrepreneurs Party appeared on first round ballots despite dying in a car accident on 15 March 2026, since they had already been printed.

The remaining two candidates who went to the run-off election, Keiko Fujimori and Roberto Sánchez, appeared on the second round ballot.

== Campaign ==
The primary concerns among voters in the election were corruption and crime, though with extortion and homicides increasing greatly since the previous election, security became the main concern for voters.

=== First round ===
==== Campaign issues ====
Extortion crimes increased 1,000% between 2023 and 2025, with gangs targeting schools, small businesses and transportation workers, killing workers who refuse to pay protection payments. Between 2019 and 2024, the national homicide rate grew 200% and in 2025, about 33% of people reported knowing someone affected by extortion. Over 500 schools in Peru faced extortion, 325 were closed due to threats and in some instances, schools began accounting for extortion payments in their budgets. In 2025, over 50 transportation drivers in Lima and surrounding areas were murdered, reportedly related to extortion conflicts. According to experts, the causes of the increase of crime include economic difficulties following the COVID-19 pandemic, the political crisis in Peru, the expansion of foreign gangs, and corrupt or bribed police cooperating with gangs. States of emergencies were declared and troops were deployed onto streets, though this resulted in no change in crime rates. In a notable event, the Círculo Militar de Chorrillos shooting occurred when a gang attempting to extort the cumbia band Agua Marina fired their guns at the band while on stage on 8 October 2025, with the shooting leading to the impeachment of Dina Boluarte as some argued her crime prevention policies being ineffective.

The growth of crime resulted in extreme positions by some political candidates. Front-runner Keiko Fujimori proposed having those incarcerated perform jobs in order to eat, stating "We will force prisoners to work for their food". Carlos Álvarez described himself as "the Peruvian Bukele", and said that if in office, he would designate all criminals as military targets subject to death if they did not surrender, saying "to hell with the human rights of criminals". Rafael Lopez Aliaga proposed capturing criminals, helicoptering them into prisons in the Amazon rainforest and having the jails surrounded by South American bushmaster vipers. Lopez Aliaga also proposed greater cooperation with the United States on crime, approving American troops to apprehend criminals in Peru and sending prisoners to the Terrorism Confinement Center in El Salvador.

=== Second round ===
Multiple protests occurred throughout Peru against Fujimori's candidacy after she entered the second round, with anti-Fujimorists sharing fears that she will lead an authoritarian government similar to her father, Alberto Fujimori, who served 16 years in prison following convictions for crimes against humanity. Harvard University professor Steven Levitsky stated that if Fujimori were to attempt to create an authoritarian government following an election victory, she would face little opposition from Peru's institutions as she has taken advantage of political connections in the Armed Forces, businesses and with "criminal or semi-criminal alliances". These protests affected Fujimori's final campaign rally in Huancayo, Junín, on 26 May 2026, where protests became so severe that police resorted to dispersing demonstrators with tear gas, with Fujimori announcing following the incident that "Order will return to Junín and all of Peru". On 31 May 2026, thousands marched in Lima against Fujimori's candidacy. During the campaign, she was endorsed by international conservative figures including Abelardo de la Espriella, Jeanine Áñez, Iván Duque, Felipe Calderón, Vicente Fox, Mauricio Macri, Eduardo Frei Ruiz-Tagle, Flávio Bolsonaro, José Antonio Kast, and Mariano Rajoy.

==== Second round candidate endorsements ====
For the second round of elections, former candidates provided or withheld endorsements for second round candidates:

Party	Congress %	Endorsement
Popular Renewal	11.04%	Keiko Fujimori
Party of Good Government	10.47%	For spoilt/blank ballots
Ahora Nación	8.18%	Roberto Sánchez
Civic Party OBRAS	8.84%	Roberto Sánchez
Country for All	6.3%	No endorsement
First the People	3.3%	Roberto Sánchez
People's Liberty	1.1%	No endorsement
Free Peru		No endorsement
Purple Party	0.8%	No endorsement
Venceremos	0.6%	Roberto Sánchez
Workers and Entrepreneurs Party	0.1%	Roberto Sánchez
Candidate	First round %	Endorsement
Rafael López Aliaga	11.90%	Keiko Fujimori
Jorge Nieto	10.98%	For spoilt/blank ballots
Ricardo Belmont	10.15%	Roberto Sánchez
Alfonso López Chau	7.29%	Roberto Sánchez
Marisol Pérez Tello	3.41%	No endorsement
Carlos Espá	3.35%	Keiko Fujimori
George Forsyth	0.91%	Roberto Sánchez
Ronald Atencio	0.84%	Roberto Sánchez
Rosario Fernández	0.77%	Roberto Sánchez
Vladimir Cerrón	0.60%	No endorsement
Roberto Chiabra	0.41%	Keiko Fujimori
Rafael Belaúnde	0.24%	Keiko Fujimori

== Conduct ==
=== First round ===
Days before the election, a survey showed that 80% of respondents said they did not understand the mechanisms of voting, especially with such a large ballot with multiple columns.

Election monitoring was performed by the Electoral Observation Mission of the European Union, which comprised 150 members, and 90 officials of the Organization of American States (OAS). Other monitoring included individuals from the Association of World Election Bodies, the Carter Center, the Center for Electoral Advisory and Promotion and the Inter-American Union of Electoral Organizations, alongside local monitoring groups. About 10,550 locations hosted 92,720 voting stations nationally. Internationally, 4,000 voting stations were established, though voting in Israel, Jordan, Kuwait, Lebanon, Qatar, and Saudi Arabia was cancelled due to the 2026 Iran war.

On election day, ballots and materials for dozens of polling stations were delivered late or not delivered at all, resulting in over 50,000 people being unable to vote. Voting issues in Orlando, Florida, and Paterson, New Jersey, were also reported. These complications resulted in an extension in the voting deadline for the affected voters. Voters in Chile, where about 113,000 Peruvians reside, expressed frustrations as well when shuttles promised to bring people to polling stations were not used and when the opening of voting at Espacio Riesco was delayed by five hours, starting at 12:00 noon (UTC−05:00) instead of the planned 7:00. Reports by the National Office of Electoral Processes (ONPE) showed that this delay had an insignificant effect on voter turnout.

Keiko Fujimori was quickly determined to be the candidate most likely heading to the second round of presidential elections. As the tabulation of voting data occurred, left-wing candidate Roberto Sánchez saw his position move from 6th place to 3rd place by 15 April. While a group of European Union electoral observers and governmental authorities reported no voting irregularities, right-wing protestors gathered at the headquarters of the National Jury of Elections (JNE), participating in sit-in demonstrations. On 24 April 2026, the JNE ruled 3–2 against annulling the first round of elections and said that the second round would occur on its already scheduled date of 7 June 2026.

=== Second round ===
A report reviewed by OjoPúblico showed that the scanning of ballots in the first round reportedly failed in 17 countries, and Foreign Minister Carlos Pareja Ríos, a former ambassador to the United States, demanded that the Electoral Counting System (SCE) be suspended for the second round at 108 consulate offices in 59 countries, which represented about 1.1 million eligible voters. A week before the second round, the ONPE suspended the use of the SCE and decided that voting minutes would be physically transferred to Peru in diplomatic bags and reviewed. The decision raised some concern from Víctor Rico Frontaura, head of the OAS monitoring group, though he said no substantial irregularities affected the second round.

Following a complaint by journalist Karla Ramírez about irregularities in favor of Together For Peru (mainly, other ballots were marked in favor of Popular Force), the ONPE intervened, together with the national police, the Public Ministry, and the armed forces. It was later confirmed that 90 ballots had been previously marked, two people were arrested, and that fifty ballots had already been replaced with new ones.

Due to very tight results and highly likely recount, ONPE said a full count was expected to be completed by July.

Both Fujimori and Sánchez called for ballots to be annulled in each other's strongholds, citing alleged irregularities. While Sánchez received the majority of domestic votes, Fujimori's later lead was attributed to foreign votes from expatriates located mainly in Argentina, Spain and the United States. Following the cancellation of the SCE, the arrival commercial flights of consular staff holding foreign votes began on 10 June. Sánchez has not conceded and has alleged fraud, especially after the SCE suspension with international voting, saying he has instead won and would defend his "popular victory", drawing comparison to Fujimori's own initial rejection of the 2021 election.

== Opinion polls ==
=== First round ===
Opinion polling experienced multiple shifts between the more than 30 candidates in the first round of presidential elections. In a September 2025 poll, about 71% of respondents made the mistake of believing Mario Vizcarra was his brother Martín Vizcarra. Despite this, a later poll showed Vizcarra becoming the second most popular presidential candidate by mid-October 2025. His lead steadily declined shortly thereafter. Wolfgang Grozo's standings in the polls grew by early March 2026, as he became the fifth most supported presidential candidate according to CPI polls and assumed fourth place in the IEP polls.

In most of the period prior to the election, López Aliaga was recognized as the frontrunner in polls. Days before the election on 4 April 2026, La República reported that the chief of Opinion Studies at the Institute of Peruvian Studies, Patricia Zárate, observed that Sánchez was experiencing a similar growth in support in polls as Castillo did at the same period prior to the 2021 Peruvian general election.

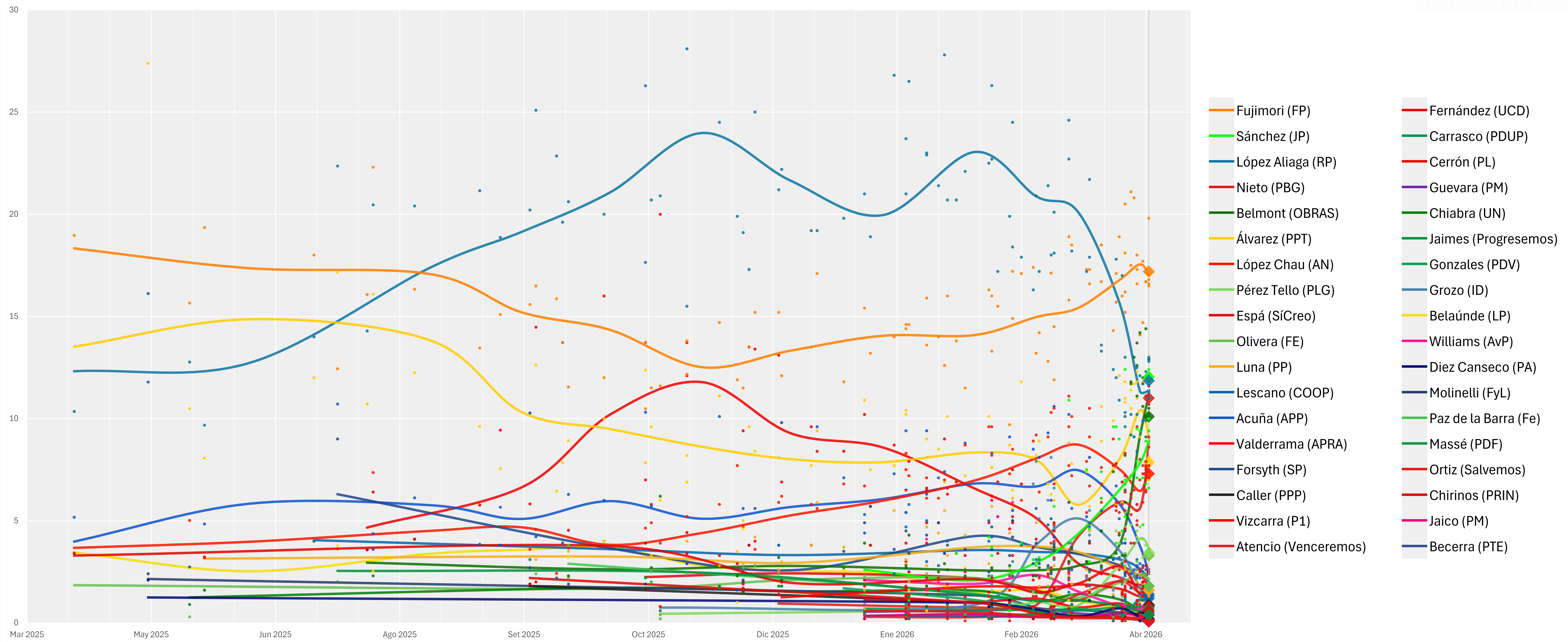
Trend lines of the voting intention polls for the first round.

=== Second round ===
In the second round, Fujimori maintained a lead in opinion polls during the entire period between rounds.

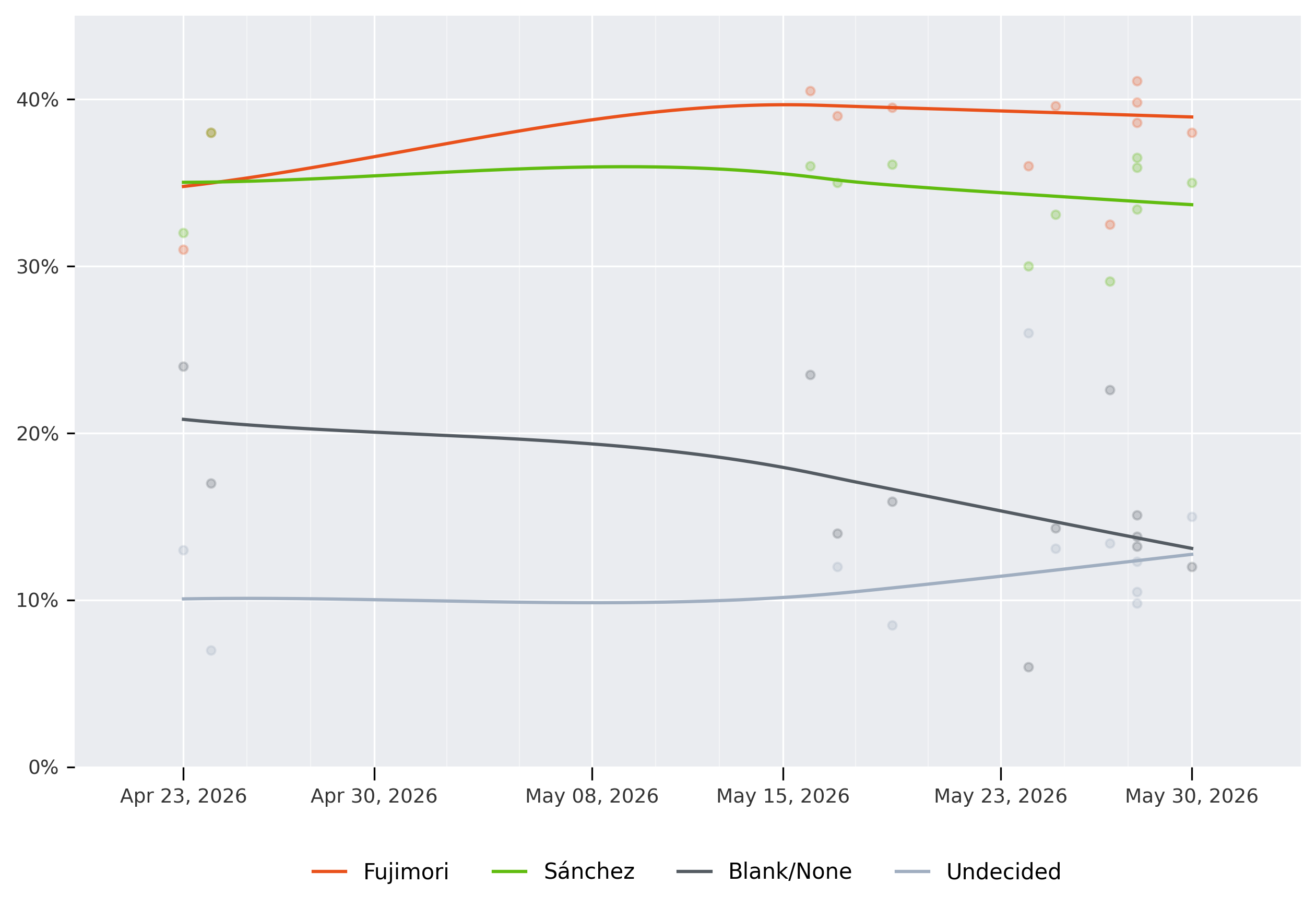
Trend lines of the voting intention polls for the second round.

== Results ==
=== President ===
Candidate	Running mate	Party	First round		Second round	
Candidate	Running mate	Party	Votes	%	Votes	%
Keiko Fujimori	Luis Galarreta; Miki Torres	Popular Force	2,877,678	17.19	9,223,396	50.13
Roberto Sánchez	Analí Márquez; Brígida Curo	Together for Peru	2,015,114	12.04	9,173,755	49.87
Rafael López Aliaga	Norma Yarrow; Jhon Ramos Malpica	Popular Renewal	1,993,905	11.91		
Jorge Nieto	Susana Matute Charún; Carlos Caballero León	Party of Good Government	1,837,517	10.98		
Ricardo Belmont	Daniel Barragán; Dina Hancco	Civic Party OBRAS	1,698,903	10.15		
Carlos Álvarez	María Chambizea Reyes; Diego Guevara Vivando	Country for All	1,326,717	7.93		
Alfonso López Chau	Luis Villanueva Carbajal; Ruth Buendía	Ahora Nación	1,221,272	7.30		
Marisol Pérez Tello	Raúl Molina; Manuel Ato del Avellanal	First the People	571,170	3.41		
Carlos Espá	Alejandro Santa María; Melitza Yanzich	SíCreo Party	560,792	3.35		
Fernando Olivera	Elizabeth León; Carlos Cuaresma	Front of Hope 2021	307,880	1.84		
José Luna	Cecilia García; Raúl Noblecilla	Podemos Perú	266,768	1.59		
Yonhy Lescano	Carmela Salazar Jáuregui; Vanesa Lazo Valles	Popular Cooperation	214,779	1.28		
César Acuña	Jessica Tumi Rivas; Alejandro Soto Reyes	Alliance for Progress	192,516	1.15		
Enrique Valderrama	María Inés Valdivia; Lucio Antonio Vásquez	Peruvian Aprista Party	161,248	0.96		
George Forsyth	Johanna Lozada Baldwin; Herbe Olave Ugarte	We Are Peru	153,073	0.91		
Herbert Caller	Rossana Montes Tello; Jorge Carcovich Cartolezzi	Patriotic Party of Peru	144,183	0.86		
Mario Vizcarra	Carlos Illanes Calderón; Judith Mendoza Díaz	Peru First	143,908	0.86		
Ronald Atencio	Elena Rivera; Alberto Quintanilla	Venceremos	140,174	0.84		
Rosario Fernández	Arturo Fernández; Carlos Pinillos Vinces	A Different Path	128,009	0.76		
Charlie Carrasco	María Paredes Verci; Wilbert Segovia Quin	United Peru Democratic Party	119,028	0.71		
Vladimir Cerrón	Flavio Cruz; Bertha Rojas	Free Peru	100,073	0.60		
Mesías Guevara	Herber Cueva; Marisol Liñán	Purple Party	82,196	0.49		
Roberto Chiabra	Javier Bedoya Denegri; Neldy Mendoza	National Unity	67,939	0.41		
Paul Jaimes	Mónica Guillén; Jorge Caloggero Encina	Progresemos	66,046	0.39		
Álex Gonzales	Bertha Azabache; Wellington Prada	Green Democratic Party	63,924	0.38		
Wolfgang Grozo	Maritza Sánchez Perales; Félix Murazzo	Democratic Integrity	63,751	0.38		
Rafael Belaúnde Llosa	Pedro Cateriano; Tania Porles	People's Liberty	40,870	0.24		
José Williams	Fernán Altuve; Adriana Tudela	Avanza País	32,585	0.19		
Francisco Diez-Canseco	Diego Koster; Clara Quispe	Peru Action	31,710	0.19		
Fiorella Molinelli	Gilbert Violeta; María Pariona	Force and Liberty	27,217	0.16		
Álvaro Paz de la Barra	Yessika Arteaga; Shella Palacios	Faith in Peru	23,335	0.14		
Armando Massé	Virgilio Acuña; Lidia Lourdes Díaz	Federal Democratic Party	21,744	0.13		
Antonio Ortiz	Jaime Freundt; Giovanna Demurtas	Let's Save Peru	17,648	0.11		
Walter Chirinos	Julio Vega Ybáñez; Mayra Vargas Gil	PRIN Political Party	14,566	0.09		
Carlos Jaico	Miguel Almenara; Liz Quispe Santos	Modern Peru	9,801	0.06		
Napoleón Becerra † (Note: Deceased in a car accident on 15 March 2026, but his ticket remained on a ballot, with all votes for him counted as invalid)	Winston Huamán; Nélida Cuayla	Workers and Entrepreneurs Party	0	0.00		
Total			16,738,039	100.00	18,397,151	100.00
Valid votes			16,738,039	82.99	18,397,151	93.47
Invalid votes			1,056,811	5.24	1,167,836	5.93
Blank votes			2,372,895	11.77	118,396	0.60
Total votes			20,167,745	100.00	19,683,383	100.00
Registered voters/turnout			27,325,432	73.81	27,325,432	72.03
Source: ONPE (Round 1) ONPE (Round 2)

==== By department ====
===== First round =====
Department	Fujimori		Sánchez Palomino		López Aliaga		Nieto		Belmont		Álvarez		López Chau		Others		Blank	Invalid	Turnout	
	Votes	%	Votes	%	Votes	%	Votes	%	Votes	%	Votes	%	Votes	%	Votes	%	Votes	Votes	Voters	%
Amazonas	28,403	17.37%	59,302	36.27%	6,034	3.69%	5,971	3.65%	17,400	10.64%	4,068	2.49%	9,775	5.98%	32,529	19.90%	36,318	15,329	215,129	62.31%
Ancash	97,743	18.00%	81,477	15.00%	32,819	6.04%	40,197	7.40%	54,641	10.06%	53,989	9.94%	48,017	8.84%	134,140	24.70%	104,367	50,131	697,521	71.81%
Apurimac	13,861	6.90%	82,531	41.06%	6,349	3.16%	7,302	3.63%	28,388	14.12%	2,928	1.46%	21,643	10.77%	37,987	18.90%	39,781	14,640	255,410	70.68%
Arequipa	64,430	7.33%	88,766	10.09%	93,233	10.60%	164,086	18.66%	96,079	10.92%	73,301	8.33%	81,964	9.32%	217,706	24.75%	75,007	39,576	994,148	81.05%
Ayacucho	23,058	8.12%	89,314	31.43%	7,750	2.73%	15,722	5.53%	41,070	14.46%	6,545	2.30%	41,010	14.43%	59,662	21.00%	52,951	19,270	356,352	68.50%
Cajamarca	89,279	13.85%	268,961	41.72%	20,875	3.24%	29,660	4.60%	70,873	10.99%	20,287	3.15%	29,048	4.51%	115,641	17.94%	124,649	54,285	823,558	68.70%
Callao	119,476	20.70%	17,377	3.01%	86,785	15.03%	86,599	15.00%	47,105	8.16%	69,984	12.12%	34,326	5.95%	115,652	20.03%	62,495	31,746	671,545	78.18%
Cusco	42,553	6.14%	158,426	22.85%	32,775	4.73%	61,621	8.89%	109,331	15.77%	20,035	2.89%	102,237	14.75%	166,383	24.00%	99,060	49,391	841,812	74.25%
Huancavelica	12,238	7.08%	75,063	43.40%	4,077	2.36%	5,605	3.24%	23,433	13.55%	2,953	1.71%	15,996	9.25%	33,591	19.42%	32,882	12,163	218,001	64.22%
Huanuco	52,987	15.46%	102,366	29.88%	20,181	5.89%	15,879	4.63%	48,360	14.11%	19,103	5.58%	20,174	5.89%	63,587	18.56%	73,344	24 876	440,857	67.15%
Ica	98,052	20.33%	37,264	7.73%	45,300	9.39%	47,605	9.87%	51,550	10.69%	55,939	11.60%	31,908	6.62%	114,653	23.77%	71,505	29,446	583,222	81.68%
Junin	108,631	17.11%	78,227	12.32%	48,223	7.59%	50,716	7.99%	70,985	11.18%	45,865	7.22%	69,940	11.01%	162,500	25.59%	107,546	42,977	785,610	73.94%
La Libertad	188,993	20.26%	88,291	9.47%	76,520	8.20%	91,566	9.82%	66,168	7.09%	74,254	7.96%	38,080	4.08%	308,921	33.12%	159,363	74,438	1,166,594	75.13%
Lambayeque	176,103	26.41%	71,644	10.74%	57,305	8.59%	68,907	10.33%	50,063	7.51%	61,658	9.25%	29,795	4.47%	151,340	22.70%	100,404	50,644	817,863	77.79%
Lima	1,089,534	17.91%	199,439	3.28%	1,211,672	19.92%	918,765	15.11%	555,669	9.14%	542,877	8.93%	414,494	6.82%	1,149,847	18.90%	555,344	271,755	6,909,396	79.87%
Loreto	96,815	28.36%	33,655	9.86%	22,835	6.69%	12,233	3.58%	14,264	4.18%	40,444	11.85%	14,691	4.30%	106,389	31.17%	85,358	27,394	454,078	58.52%
Madre de Dios	10,948	13.55%	18,948	23.45%	2,761	3.42%	4,190	5.19%	11,789	14.59%	5,087	6.30%	6,506	8.05%	20,567	25.46%	18,508	5,242	104,546	70.84%
Moquegua	7,569	6.64%	14,719	12.92%	6,601	5.79%	11,909	10.45%	13,899	12.20%	6,145	5.39%	11,986	10.52%	41,126	36.09%	12,001	5,361	131,316	79.77%
Pasco	21,842	18.87%	21,606	18.67%	7,650	6.61%	5,183	4.48%	13,855	11.97%	4,738	4.09%	10,281	8.88%	30,597	26.43%	22,142	8,150	146,044	65.29%
Piura	246,696	28.03%	100,908	11.47%	58,795	6.68%	77,122	8.76%	65,325	7.42%	93,588	10.64%	40,950	4.65%	196,635	22.34%	183,282	84,163	1,147,464	74.80%
Puno	25,389	3.90%	162,460	24.98%	12,442	1.91%	26,989	4.15%	115,259	17.72%	10,602	1.63%	73,801	11.35%	223,466	34.36%	77,890	41,308	769,606	79.88%
San Martin	90,655	23.26%	93,288	23.94%	22,894	5.87%	17,394	4.46%	44,306	11.37%	19,793	5.08%	17,101	4.39%	84,304	21.63%	104,699	38,975	533,409	73.72%
Tacna	15,125	6.85%	26,302	11.92%	13,698	6.21%	25,263	11.45%	32,316	14.64%	16,162	7.32%	21,938	9.94%	69,926	31.68%	18,885	9,354	248,969	82.27%
Tumbes	37,850	34.16%	7,748	6.99%	6,556	5.92%	6,072	5.48%	5,455	4.92%	16,426	14.83%	5,440	4.91%	25,245	22.79%	21,599	9,363	141 754	78.18%
Ucayali	66,994	29.71%	29,038	12.88%	12,894	5.72%	9,938	4.41%	19,083	8.46%	23,429	10.39%	9,015	4.00%	55,109	24.44%	58,723	18,241	302,464	66.63%
Peruvians abroad	52,454	17.05%	7,994	2.60%	76,881	24.99%	31,023	10.08%	32,237	10.48%	36,517	11.87%	21,156	6.88%	49,430	16.06%	74,792	28,593	411,077	33.95%
Source: ONPE

===== Second round =====
2026 Peruvian presidential election results – Second round by Department
Department	Fujimori		Sánchez Palomino		Blank		Invalid		Turnout		Registered voters
	Votes	%	Votes	%	Votes	%	Votes	%	Votes	%	
Amazonas	69,220	35.54%	125,555	64.46%	1,825	0.88%	11,449	5.50%	208,049	60.26%	345,245
Ancash	270,818	43.37%	353,564	56.63%	6,118	0.90%	50,592	7.43%	681,092	70.12%	971,385
Apurimac	43,413	18.82%	187,285	81.18%	1,938	0.79%	12,426	5.07%	245,062	67.82%	361,338
Arequipa	334,264	36.40%	584,000	63.60%	3,777	0.39%	56,775	5.80%	978,816	79.80%	1,226,525
Ayacucho	67,502	20.71%	258,505	79.29%	2,362	0.69%	15,922	4.63%	344,291	66.18%	520,238
Cajamarca	246,039	33.24%	494,097	66.76%	7,519	0.94%	50,471	6.32%	798,126	66.58%	1,198,773
Callao	403,845	65.60%	211,803	34.40%	3,233	0.49%	42,070	6.37%	660,951	76.95%	858,968
Cusco	167,218	21.89%	596,621	78.11%	5,010	0.61%	47,125	5.78%	815,974	71.97%	1,133,754
Huancavelica	37,004	18.60%	161,991	81.41%	1,556	0.74%	9,928	4.72%	210,479	62.01%	339,448
Huanuco	140,904	35.84%	252,225	64.16%	3,235	0.77%	25,152	5.97%	421,516	64.21%	656,517
Ica	282,464	51.94%	261,387	48.06%	3,365	0.58%	29,110	5.05%	576,326	80.72%	713,997
Junin	323,824	45.07%	394,718	54.93%	4,788	0.62%	45,196	5.88%	768,526	72.33%	1,062,500
La Libertad	604,436	57.57%	445,569	42.43%	7,078	0.62%	79,694	7.01%	1,136,777	73.21%	1,552,691
Lambayeque	437,358	58.85%	305,863	41.15%	5,223	0.65%	55,617	6.92%	804,061	76.48%	1,051,350
Lima	4,072,836	63.51%	2,340,068	36.49%	33,023	0.48%	385,502	5.64%	6,831,429	78.97%	8,651,028
Loreto	214,215	53.00%	189,943	47.00%	3,444	0.79%	26,217	6.04%	433,819	55.91%	775,923
Madre de Dios	29,401	30.80%	66,058	69.20%	596	0.59%	4,567	4.54%	100,622	68.18%	147,577
Moquegua	33,495	27.44%	88,558	72.56%	622	0.48%	6,699	5.18%	129,374	78.59%	164,628
Pasco	51,747	39.30%	79,930	60.70%	992	0.70%	8,405	5.96%	141,074	63.07%	223,695
Piura	590,489	57.02%	445,100	42.98%	9,082	0.81%	80,007	7.11%	1,124,678	73.31%	1,534,085
Puno	96,486	13.59%	613,281	86.41%	2,743	0.37%	33,291	4.46%	745,801	77.41%	963,489
San Martin	219,293	45.36%	264,127	54.64%	4,581	0.88%	34,569	6.62%	522,570	72.22%	723,605
Tacna	66,335	28.67%	165,063	71.33%	1,134	0.46%	12,319	5.03%	244,851	80.91%	302,615
Tumbes	82,280	64.38%	45,530	35.62%	996	0.72%	9,769	7.05%	138,575	76.43%	181,317
Ucayali	143,122	52.56%	129,181	47.44%	2,215	0.76%	16,474	5.66%	290,992	64.11%	453,928
Peruvians abroad	195,388	63.21%	113,733	36.79%	1,941	0.59%	18,490	5.61%	329,552	27.22%	1,210,813
Source: ONPE

=== Congress ===
==== Senate ====
Party	Single National Constituency			Congressional Constituencies			Total seats
Party	Votes	%	Seats	Votes	%	Seats	Total seats
Popular Force	2,227,962	15.06	7	2,166,895	15.84	15	22
Together for Peru	1,808,783	12.23	5	1,357,453	9.92	9	14
Popular Renewal	1,633,110	11.04	5	1,620,141	11.84	3	8
Party of Good Government	1,549,920	10.48	5	1,574,317	11.51	2	7
Civic Party OBRAS	1,307,340	8.84	4	1,237,374	9.05	1	5
Ahora Nación	1,210,147	8.18	4	1,157,790	8.46	0	4
Country for All	859,371	5.81	0	846,063	6.18	0	0
First the People	524,212	3.54	0	448,850	3.28	0	0
SíCreo Party	405,601	2.74	0	60,382	0.44	0	0
Alliance for Progress	392,855	2.66	0	348,025	2.54	0	0
Podemos Perú	330,893	2.24	0	329,063	2.41	0	0
Peruvian Aprista Party	253,499	1.71	0	247,504	1.81	0	0
Front of Hope 2021	244,112	1.65	0	254,401	1.86	0	0
Agricultural People's Front of Peru	231,172	1.56	0	268,369	1.96	0	0
We Are Peru	201,460	1.36	0	234,351	1.71	0	0
Popular Cooperation	165,841	1.12	0	160,111	1.17	0	0
Peru First	154,881	1.05	0	169,652	1.24	0	0
Progresemos	146,387	0.99	0	127,381	0.93	0	0
Venceremos	135,721	0.92	0	108,681	0.79	0	0
A Different Path	126,930	0.86	0	128,437	0.94	0	0
United Peru Democratic Party	120,395	0.81	0	97,205	0.71	0	0
Patriotic Party of Peru	115,106	0.78	0	55,531	0.41	0	0
Free Peru	112,132	0.76	0	128,231	0.94	0	0
Avanza País	74,251	0.50	0	79,121	0.58	0	0
Purple Party	72,942	0.49	0	73,439	0.54	0	0
People's Liberty	68,930	0.47	0	68,939	0.50	0	0
Green Democratic Party	67,909	0.46	0	67,049	0.49	0	0
National Unity	57,605	0.39	0	62,727	0.46	0	0
Democratic Integrity	55,073	0.37	0	55,480	0.41	0	0
Force and Liberty	32,652	0.22	0	38,730	0.28	0	0
Faith in Peru	27,106	0.18	0	18,585	0.14	0	0
Federal Democratic Party	22,105	0.15	0	17,843	0.13	0	0
Peru Action	21,748	0.15	0	19,145	0.14	0	0
PRIN Political Party	21,101	0.14	0	18,866	0.14	0	0
Workers and Entrepreneurs Party	15,989	0.11	0	6,641	0.05	0	0
Let's Save Peru				14,914	0.11	0	0
Modern Peru				12,061	0.09	0	0
Total	14,795,241	100.00	30	13,679,747	100.00	30	60
Valid votes	14,795,241	73.26		13,679,747	67.75		
Invalid votes	3,123,742	15.47		3,268,589	16.19		
Blank votes	2,275,639	11.27		3,244,035	16.07		
Total votes	20,194,622	100.00		20,192,371	100.00		
Registered voters/turnout	27,325,432	73.90		27,325,432	73.90		
Source: ONPE Single District, ONPE Multiple District

==== Chamber of Deputies ====
Party	Votes	%	Seats	+/–
Popular Force	2,114,389	14.66	41	+17
Popular Renewal	1,593,041	11.04	15	+2
Together for Peru	1,553,154	10.77	32	+27
Party of Good Government	1,509,987	10.47	18	New
Ahora Nación	1,224,556	8.49	10	New
Civic Party OBRAS	1,199,888	8.32	14	New
Country for All	838,901	5.82	0	New
First the People	434,740	3.01	0	New
Alliance for Progress	401,468	2.78	0	−15
Podemos Perú	379,812	2.63	0	−5
We Are Peru	308,218	2.14	0	−5
Agricultural People's Front of Peru	272,759	1.89	0	0
Peruvian Aprista Party	268,803	1.86	0	New
SíCreo Party	244,781	1.70	0	New
Front of Hope 2021	241,274	1.67	0	New
Peru First	197,520	1.37	0	New
Popular Cooperation	163,734	1.13	0	New
Venceremos	162,492	1.13	0	New
Free Peru	138,137	0.96	0	−37
Progresemos	134,050	0.93	0	New
A Different Path	129,484	0.90	0	New
Avanza País	120,160	0.83	0	−7
People's Liberty	106,347	0.74	0	New
Patriotic Party of Peru	99,216	0.69	0	New
United Peru Democratic Party	93,554	0.65	0	New
Purple Party	88,017	0.61	0	−3
Green Democratic Party	77,126	0.53	0	New
National Unity	71,735	0.50	0	New
Democratic Integrity	60,273	0.42	0	New
Force and Liberty	47,969	0.33	0	New
PRIN Political Party	28,022	0.19	0	New
Faith in Peru	26,894	0.19	0	New
Federal Democratic Party	23,041	0.16	0	New
Let's Save Peru	21,275	0.15	0	New
Peru Action	20,566	0.14	0	New
Modern Peru	18,508	0.13	0	New
Workers and Entrepreneurs Party	12,567	0.09	0	New
Total	14,426,458	100.00	130	0
Valid votes	14,426,458	71.45		
Invalid votes	3,135,238	15.53		
Blank votes	2,629,017	13.02		
Total votes	20,190,713	100.00		
Registered voters/turnout	27,325,432	73.89		
Source: ONPE

=== List of elected Deputies ===
Name	Party	Department	Votes
Aldo Antonio Bravo Quispe	RP	Lima	20,647
Alejandro José Manay Pillaca	JP	Ayacucho	12,667
Alexander Salas Rivera	FP	Lima Provincias	5,011
Amalia Emilia Palomino Pacheco	JP	Arequipa	12,011
Ana Bertha Patiño Urco	FP	Junín	10,463
Ana Luisa Yuffra Lugo	FP	Loreto	1,423
Analí Márquez Huanca	JP	Cusco	19,815
Andrea Dayna Medina Stein	OBRAS	Lima	8,476
Ángel Bruno Bobadilla Galindo	FP	Callao	4,574
Ángel Renato Meneses Crispín	AN	Lima	14,312
Arturo César Eusebio Padilla	OBRAS	Lima Provincias	4,133
Auristela Ana Obando Morgan	FP	Callao	10,951
Azucena Isla Rojas	JP	Loreto	3,380
Jair Manrique	AN	Lima	38,995
Carlos Alberto Domínguez Herrera	FP	Áncash	3,920
Carlos Alberto Yalta Sotelo	RP	Callao	12,607
Carlos Alberto Zegarra Sánchez	FP	Ica	8,775
Carmela Paucara Paxi	FP	Piura	7,896
Carmen Georgina Duarte Patiño de Pezet	PBG	Junín	6,661
Catherin Norma Palomino Casavilca	JP	Huancavelica	13,580
Cecilia Isabel Chacón de Vettori	FP	Lima	81,234
César Augusto Holguín Loaiza	AN	Cusco	27,527
César Augusto Muedas Balbiese	AN	Junín	18,895
César Hugo Tito Rojas	JP	Puno	19,606
César Manuel Revilla Villanueva	FP	Piura	23,816
César Manuel Vidaurre Floridas	FP	Loreto	5,688
Christian Aranda Vásquez	RP	Arequipa	15,927
Daniel Jefferson Varas Seguín	JP	Áncash	8,057
Demetrio Flavio Valqui Calderón	OBRAS	La Libertad	5,288
Diego Alonso Fernando Bazán Calderón	RP	La Libertad	14,101
Diethell Columbus Murata	FP	Lima	34,200
Dina Irene Hancco Hancco	OBRAS	Puno	13,203
Édgar Adrián Alvarón de la Cruz	OBRAS	Áncash	4,733
Édgar Dember Gonzáles Polar	PBG	Arequipa	19,814
Eduardo Enrique Castillo Rivas	FP	Piura	21,130
Edwin Espinoza Huillca	PBG	Cusco	9,564
Ernesto Alonzo Zunini Yerrén	JP	Lambayeque	11,268
Félix See Hung Chang Apuy	RP	Piura	13,945
Fernando Alberto García Huby	PBG	Callao	6,603
Flor de Jesús Meza Rivera	FP	Lima	7,630
Francisco Javier Gatica Vega	FP	San Martín	4,497
Frank Krklec Torres	RP	Lima	35,171
Freshman Buitrón Martínez	AN	Ayacucho	9,792
Gabriel Robertino Gonzáles Delgado	JP	Cajamarca	26,244
Geanmarco Antonio Quezada Castro	FP	La Libertad	4,061
Giannina Iris Avendaño Vilca	JP	Lima	22,644
Gilmer Trujillo Zegarra	FP	La Libertad	15,030
Gladys Griselda Andrade Salguero de Álvarez	FP	Lima Provincias	9,687
Gloria Charito Hirache Pizarro	PBG	Arequipa	9,668
Graciela Chipana Condori	JP	Moquegua	2,761
Gustavo Alexander Segura Figueroa	RP	Lima	39,528
Harvey Colchado	AN	Lima	143,244
Haydée Celinda Poma Huamani	JP	Madre de Dios	2,064
Heber López Letona	OBRAS	Cusco	8,701
Héctor Guillén Valencia	JP	Huancavelica	7,296
Helard Bladimir Sonco Villanueva	AN	Puno	14,617
Henry Antonio Albañil Carmona	OBRAS	Piura	5,049
Hilda Judit Fernández de la Torre	PBG	Lima Provincia	27,006
Indira Huilca	AN	Lima	92,985
Jacqueline Viviana Tapullima Insapillo	JP	San Martín	6,859
Jaime Américo Abensur Pinasco	FP	Ucayali	4,040
James Arturo Holguín Aguirre	JP	Madre de Dios	2,856
Javier Alejandro Castro Cruz	FP	Lambayeque	8,249
Javier José María Cipriani Thorne	RP	Lima	40,119
Jeenny Cristina Samanez Gonzáles Vigil	OBRAS	Lima	19,689
Jessica Benítez Barrionuevo	PBG	Lima	13,884
Jessica Lizbeth Navas Sánchez	FP	Ucayali	11,979
Jessica Roxana Guevara Ramírez	JP	Cajamarca	5,463
Jessica Sadith Pérez Quispe	JP	Puno	21,521
Jesús Pérez Alccahuamán	JP	Apurímac	13,866
Jhonn Brayam Valquí Ordóñez	FP	Pasco	2,797
Jorge Arturo Zeballos Aponte	RP	Peruanos Residentes en el Extranjero	7,958
José Isidro Baella Malca	RP	Lima	76,554
Marvin Palma	FP	Lambayeque	28,534
José Miguel Marcelo Salazar	AN	Áncash	6,880
José Ricardo Yataco Torrealva	OBRAS	Ica	5,762
Juan Amílcar Villanueva Calderón	JP	Cajamarca	4,141
Juan César Cabrera Nieto	OBRAS	Tacna	3,552
Julián Luis Pérez Mallqui	JP	Cusco	15,774
Karina Juliza Beteta Rubín	FP	Huánuco	7,694
Kim Tami Muñoz Yurivilca	FP	Pasco	2,001
Leo Miguel de Paz Lancho	RP	Lima	22,858
Leticia Maruja Leiva Baylón	FP	La Libertad	5,525
Lila Marianela Prado Vallejos	PBG	Ica	4,410
Liliana Milagros Takayama Jiménez	FP	Lambayeque	5,796
Liz Huli Mendoza Bernedo	FP	Peruanos Residentes en el Extranjero	4,053
Luis Ángel Jibaja Ramos	JP	Cajamarca	4,235
Luis Arturo Alegría García	FP	San Martín	9,969
Luis Aurelio Masco Cáceres	OBRAS	Arequipa	8,876
Luis Eliseo Quispe Candia	PBG	Lima	29,675
Luz Mérida Soto Ferrari	JP	Apurímac	6,359
Luzmila María del Carmen Gamarra Pita	FP	Áncash	11,916
Mady Verónica Yonz Núñez	RP	Ica	8,800
Marco Antonio Flores Valdizán	JP	Huánuco	3,751
Marco Antonio Pacheco Quispe	FP	Lima	14,267
María Candelaria Ramos Rosales	FP	Tumbes	1,275
María Luisa Silupú Inga	FP	Piura	5,298
Marino Teófilo Lavado Valdivia	JP	La Libertad	10,067
Marleny Bibiana Arminta Valencia	AN	Arequipa	15,640
Marlon Alberto Aguirre Ramos	JP	Junín	10,554
Máximo Peralta Jorpa	OBRAS	Junín	6,844
Mery Eliana Infantes Castañeda	FP	Amazonas	1,444
Miguel Félix Huamán Cornejo	PBG	Piura	5,191
Milagros Karina Santana Vera	PBG	Lima Provincias	3,108
Nary Benvinda Pinasco Montenegro	FP	Loreto	6,059
Nathaly Molina	PBG	Lima	30,069
Nery Rodolfo Fernández Nina	PBG	Moquegua	1,634
Nora María Llaque Linares	PBG	La Libertad	8,765
Norma Martina Yarrow Lumbreras	RP	Lima	126,370
Olver Peña Córdova	JP	San Martín	10,518
Óscar de Jesús Reto Otero	PBG	Lima	54,276
Oswar Elbis Cahuaza Mitivire	JP	Ucayali	3,529
Paola Isabel Martínez Paitán	RP	Lima	24,714
Pierangeli Daniela Dodero Jovich	FP	Lima	12,477
Pier Paolo Figari Mendoza	FP	Lima	17,742
Pilar Sulca Castillo	JP	Ayacucho	2,276
Rafael Aldo Celiz Castillo	FP	Tumbes	3,352
Raúl Jesús Camargo Porta	OBRAS	Lima	7,575
Remigio Condori Flores	JP	Puno	17,517
Romina Alejandra Uribe Sáenz	PBG	Lima	12,283
Rosangella Andrea Barbarán Reyes	FP	Lima	28,248
Rossana Herminia Alayza Maccera	PBG	Lima	13,876
Roxana María Rocha Gallegos	RP	Lima	53,998
Royser Castro Grandez	FP	Amazonas	4,624
Segundo Juan Castrejón Fernández	PBG	Lambayeque	7,782
Segundo Senovio Ticlla Rafael	FP	Cajamarca	7,462
Svieta Valia Fernández González	JP	Tacna	3,718
Víctor Eduardo Piñan Mamani	OBRAS	Lima	14,721
Yenifer Paredes	JP	Cajamarca	72,450
Yuli Liliana Ambrosio Domínguez	JP	Huánuco	9,242
Source: Jurado Nacional de Elecciones – JNE

=== Andean Parliament ===
Party	Votes	%	Seats	+/–
Popular Force	2,038,478	15.25	1	0
Party of Good Government	1,652,598	12.36	1	New
Together for Peru	1,617,188	12.10	1	+1
Popular Renewal	1,534,885	11.48	1	0
Civic Party OBRAS	1,273,403	9.52	1	New
Ahora Nación	1,116,973	8.35	0	New
Country for All	817,963	6.12	0	New
First the People	482,337	3.61	0	New
Agricultural People's Front of Peru	297,417	2.22	0	0
Podemos Perú	282,221	2.11	0	0
Alliance for Progress	256,063	1.92	0	0
Peruvian Aprista Party	237,669	1.78	0	New
We Are Peru	196,885	1.47	0	0
Popular Cooperation	149,255	1.12	0	New
Peru First	148,076	1.11	0	New
Venceremos	138,788	1.04	0	New
Free Peru	128,377	0.96	0	–1
A Different Path	126,860	0.95	0	New
Progresemos	120,219	0.90	0	New
Patriotic Party of Peru	111,169	0.83	0	New
United Peru Democratic Party	100,474	0.75	0	New
Purple Party	93,484	0.70	0	0
People's Liberty	71,505	0.53	0	New
Green Democratic Party	66,667	0.50	0	New
Avanza País	65,135	0.49	0	–1
Democratic Integrity	57,271	0.43	0	New
National Unity	55,285	0.41	0	New
Force and Liberty	36,011	0.27	0	New
Faith in Peru	25,772	0.19	0	New
PRIN Political Party	23,222	0.17	0	New
Let's Save Peru	21,119	0.16	0	New
Modern Peru	13,365	0.10	0	New
Workers and Entrepreneurs Party	13,166	0.10	0	New
Total	13,369,300	100.00	5	0
Valid votes	13,369,300	66.29		
Invalid votes	2,917,275	14.46		
Blank votes	3,881,934	19.25		
Total votes	20,168,509	100.00		
Registered voters/turnout	27,325,432	73.81		
Source: ONPE

== Aftermath ==
=== First round ===
"If you don't declare this filth null and void, Mr. Burneo, get ready ... You're going to get a big one. A huge tortoise so you'll behave like a man. You know where I'm going to shove it. We're going to shove the tortoise in you, you know exactly where."

— Rafael López Aliaga, 14 April 2026

During the election, dozens of polling stations opened late or did not open at all, which initially prevented more than 60,000 voters from being able to cast their votes; because of this, the National Office of Electoral Processes (ONPE) extended voting until 18:00 and extended the election until 13 April in areas affected. It was found that the company responsible for transporting election material had failed to comply with its contract, leaving polling stations unable to operate. The headquarters of the company were subsequently raided by the police. An investigation revealed that the government had already penalized the company for failing to fulfill its contracts regarding the election on three previous occasions, and that already in March the authorities had warned ONPE of risks that tasking the company with the distribution of election materials would entail. As the result, José Samamé Blas, the ONPE's electoral management director, was arrested and charged with dereliction of duty and refusal to perform official duties.

In the weeks leading up to the elections, El País reported that Rafael López Aliaga had already begun saying electoral fraud took place. According to La República, Rafael López Aliaga implemented a disinformation campaign to discredit the election, accusing electoral authorities of engaging in fraud. The newspaper reported that former police intelligence agents that were assisting López Aliaga's Popular Renewal party told journalists that a plan was organized by the party to remove head of the ONPE, Piero Corvetto and the head of the JNE, Roberto Burneo, replacing them with sympathetic officials who would invalidate the election. Several mostly right-wing presidential candidates, including López Aliaga, Wolfgang Grozo, Herbert Caller, Álex Gonzales, and Francisco Diez-Canseco called for an invalidation of the election. López Aliaga organized a demonstration, demanding the invalidation of the election. El País reported that during a speech, López Aliaga made homophobic attacks and said he would rape Roberto Burneo with a tortoise if he did not annul the elections. He accused the authorities of conducting "ballot box stuffing" in order to make Keiko Fujimori advance to the runoff; López Aliaga also called for an "insurgency" if the elections were not invalidated. After calling for an insurgency, López Aliaga faced criminal charges related to an alleged incitement of civil disorder from the Public Ministry of Peru.

In addition to his call for protests, López Aliaga offered 20,000 Peruvian soles (approximately 6,000 United States dollars in April 2026) to individuals who assisted his argument of electoral fraud being committed. Fujimori, who had previously offered her alliance with López Aliaga by avoiding political attacks, said that she would provide all representatives of her Popular Force party to assist López Aliaga in any potential fact-finding. According to La República, this may have been an attempt by Fujimori to prevent Sánchez from advancing to the second round of elections. Sánchez reacted to López Aliaga's offer to pay those assisting his electoral fraud narrative by saying "If there are doubts about this process, they must be substantiated with evidence before the authorities, not by paying bribes."

ONPE head Piero Corvetto resigned as a result of the controversy and faced investigations related to the implementation of the first round of elections.

=== Second round ===
Sánchez leaped to an early lead, resulting in a massive sell-off of the S&P/BVL Peru General Index. Despite not all the votes being counted, the Wall Street Journal called the race for Fujimori on 11 June, stating that despite her holding a lead of just 50.002%, pollsters viewed her victory as a statistical inevitability. Reuters, despite not yet calling the election, noted on 11 June that the last 3% or so of the vote to be counted would be contested votes, which were mostly from the Lima metropolitan region, a Fujimori stronghold. The following day, The Daily Telegraph and The Times also published articles indicating that Fujimori was poised to be elected president. Reuters also noted that U.S.-listed Peruvian mining company stocks like Compañía de Minas Buenaventura spiked after Fujimori retook the lead, and the sol steadied from its decline. On 15 June, Americas Quarterly, the publication of the Americas Society and the Council of the Americas, called the race for Fujimori.

On 23 June, Fujimori obtained a statistically unbeatable lead and began outlining her opening acts as president, including filling her cabinet with technocrats and promising to fight crime. Sánchez, meanwhile, stated that he would not recognize the results, saying that the diaspora votes were fraudulent and filed a formal request for the JNE to annul the results. However, on 6 July, Sánchez retracted his fraud allegations and conceded the election.

On 29 June, after Fujimori was confirmed as winner of the runoff election, various international politicians reacted to the election and congratulated her, including Bolivian president Rodrigo Paz, Argentinian president Javier Milei, Colombian president-elect Abelardo de la Espriella, Chilean president José Antonio Kast, Paraguayan president Santiago Peña and vice president Pedro Alliana, the World Bank's LAC region vice president Susana Cordeiro Guerra, Inter-American Development Bank president Ilan Goldfajn, OAS secretary general Albert Ramdin, Costa Rican president Laura Fernández, Ecuadorian president Daniel Noboa, El Salvadoran president Nayib Bukele, Honduran president Nasry Asfura, Spanish prime minister Pedro Sánchez, Chinese president Xi Jinping, and Israeli Foreign Minister Gideon Sa'ar.

== See also ==
- List of close election results
