= Óscar Reto =

Peruvian military officer and politician (born 1962)

Óscar de Jesús Reto

President of the Chamber of Deputies
- Incumbent
- Assumed office 26 July 2026
- Vice President: 1st Vice President; Analí Márquez; 2nd Vice President; Harvey Colchado; 3rd Vice President; José Yataco
- Preceded by: Fernando Rospigliosi (Note: as President of the unicameral Congress of the Republic; President of the Chamber of Deputies position last held in 1992 by Roberto Ramírez del Villar)

Member of the Chamber of Deputies
- Incumbent
- Assumed office 26 July 2026
- Constituency: Lima

Personal details
- Born: April 28, 1962 (age 64) Zorritos District, Peru
- Party: Party of Good Government
- Education: Chorrillos Military School; Universidad Alas Peruanas
- Profession: Politician

Óscar de Jesús Reto Otero (born 28 April 1962) is a Peruvian military officer and politician who has been serving as the President of the Chamber of Deputies of Peru since July 26, 2026.

== Political career ==
In the 2026 Peruvian general election, he was elected as a member of the newly established Chamber of Deputies for the Lima constituency.

On 26 July 2026, he was elected president of the Chamber of Deputies for the 2026-2027 annual session, defeating the list by Norma Yarrow, a member of the Popular Renewal party and its coalition with the ruling party Popular Force.

In the new Congress of the Republic, his party collaborated with the left-wing coalition, including Together for Peru, Civic Party OBRAS, and Ahora Nación, in which all parties held a vice presidency in Reto's candidate list for the presidency of the Chamber of Deputies.

Because the President of Congress is an ex-officio role held by the president of the Senate of Peru; thus, Reto, as the president of the Chamber of Deputies, is not in the Peru presidential line of succession.
