= Workers and Entrepreneurs Party =

Political party in Peru

Workers and Entrepreneurs Party Partido de los Trabajadores y Emprendedores
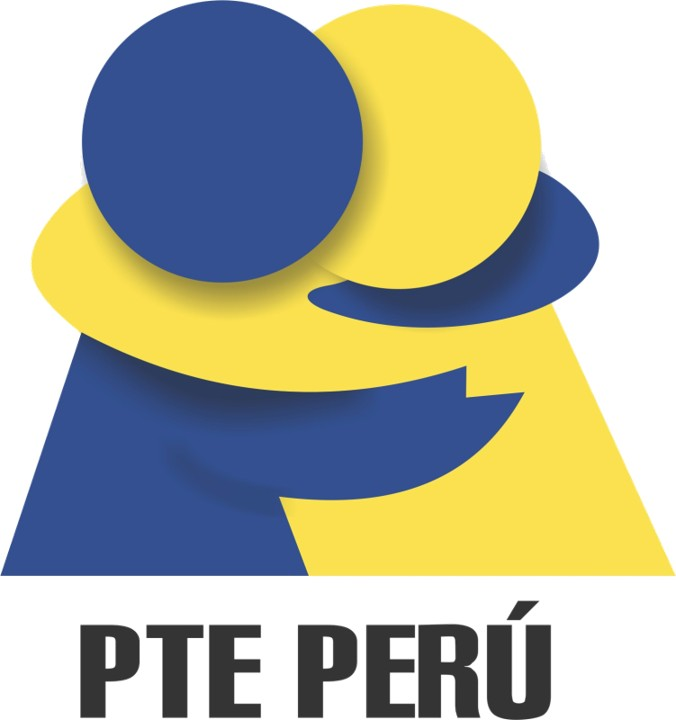
- Abbreviation: PTE
- President: Vacant
- Founder: Napoleón Becerra García
- Founded: 14 April 2023
- Headquarters: Lima
- Ideology: Communism; Marxism–Leninism; Mariáteguism; Left-wing nationalism
- Political position: Left-wing to far-left
- Colors: Blue Yellow

Website
- https://pte.pe/

The Workers and Entrepreneurs Party (Spanish: Partido de los Trabajadores y Emprendedores) is a Peruvian political party of which the vast majority its members are part of the Communist Party of Peru – Red Fatherland. Founded in April 2023, the party was led by Napoleón Becerra, a left-wing perennial candidate.

Among the party's most prominent members are historical former left-wing parliamentarians Rolando Breña Pantoja and César Barrera Bazán.

The party was projected to participate in the 2026 general election. However, after Becerra's death in a car accident in Huaytará, Huancavelica, the party's presidential list was ruled out according to the National Jury of Elections, given that Peruvian electoral law does not allow a replacement for a presidential nomination in the case of the candidate's death.

== Election results ==
=== Presidential ===
Election	Candidate	First round		Second round		Result
Election	Candidate	Votes	%	Votes	%	Result
2026	Napoleón Becerra	Candidate deceased				

=== Congressional ===
==== Chamber of Deputies ====
Election	Leader	Votes	%	Seats	+/–	Rank	Government
2026	Vacant	12,567	0.09	0 / 130	New	▲37th	Extra-parliamentary

==== Senate ====
Election	Leader	Votes	%	Seats	+/–	Rank	Government
2026	Vacant	15,989	0.11	0 / 60		▲35th	Extra-parliamentary
