= Adriana Tudela =

Peruvian politician

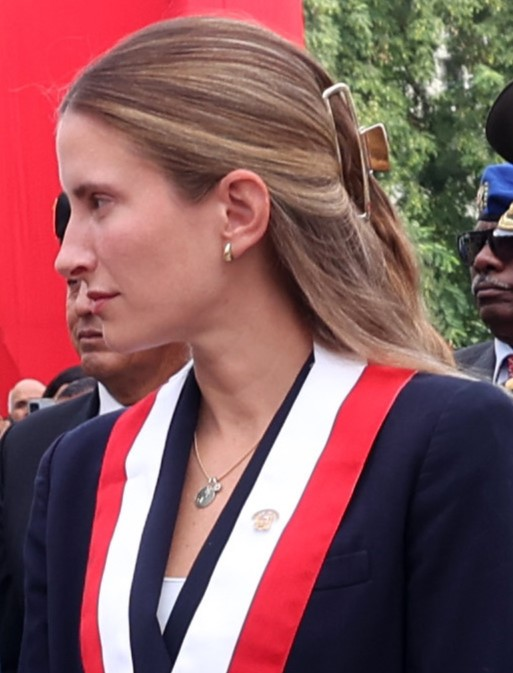

Member of Congress
- In office 26 July 2021 – 24 July 2026
- Constituency: Lima Metropolitan Area

Personal details
- Born: Adriana Josefina Tudela Gutiérrez; 20 August 1988 (age 37) Navarra, Spain
- Party: Go on Country – Social Integration Party (2020–present)
- Other political affiliations: Independent (before 2020)
- Parents: Francisco Tudela (father); Lucila Gutiérrez (mother)
- Education: University of Lima (LLB); University of Chicago (LLM)
- Profession: Lawyer

Adriana Josefina Tudela Gutiérrez (born 20 August 1988) is a Peruvian lawyer and politician. She served as a congresswoman representing Metropolitan Lima for the 2021–2026 congressional term.

== Political career ==
During the 2016-2020 legislative period, Tudela worked in the Congress of the Republic as an advisor to the congressman and president of Congress, Pedro Olaechea. According to an interview for Sudaca, she identifies herself as having positions that are a mix of liberal and conservative.

== Congresswoman ==
In the 2021 general elections, she was elected congresswoman of the republic for Avanza País, with 47,141 votes, for the parliamentary period 2021–2026.

Together with her fellow congressman, Alejandro Cavero, she was a promoter of a campaign against a constituent assembly.

In the 2026 general elections, Tudela unsuccessfully ran for a seat in the newly formed Chamber of Deputies. Tudela and the entire incumbent bench of the Go on Country party were unable to secure a single seat in the new bicameral congress.

== Electoral history ==
Election	Office	Political Party	District	Votes			Result	Ref.
Election	Office	Political Party	District	Total	%	P.	Result	Ref.
2021	Member of Congress	Go on Country – Social Integration Party	Lima Metropolitan Area	47,141	10.79%	3rd (Note: Presented on an electoral list. The data shown represents the share of the vote the entire party/alliance received in that constituency.)	Elected	
2026	Member of The Chamber of Deputies	Go on Country – Social Integration Party	Lima Metropolitan Area	26,496	-	18th	Not elected	
