= Napoleón Becerra =

Peruvian politician (1964–2026)

Napoléon Becerra
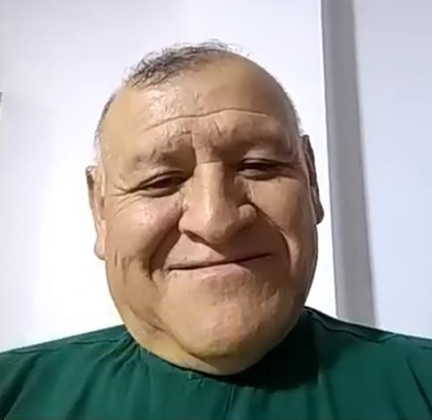
- Becerra in 2024

Personal details
- Born: Napoleón Becerra García; 11 April 1964 Cajamarca, Peru
- Died: 15 March 2026 (aged 61) Huaytará, Peru
- Party: Workers and Entrepreneurs Party
- Education: Inca Garcilaso de la Vega University
- Profession: Trade unionist; politician

Napoleón Becerra García (11 April 1964 – 15 March 2026) was a Peruvian trade unionist and politician who was a presidential candidate in the 2026 general election for the Workers and Entrepreneurs Party.

== Life and career ==
Becerra was born on 11 April 1964 in Cajamarca. He studied at Inca Garcilaso de la Vega University, earning a degree in administration and a bachelor's degree in administrative sciences in 2009. Between 1984 and 2025, Becerra worked for the government of Lima, where he stood out as a leader of municipal workers. In 2023, he founded the Workers and Entrepreneurs Party along with members of the Communist Party of Peru – Red Fatherland.

=== Death ===
Becerra died on 15 March 2026 in a car collision in the town of Huaytará, Huancavelica province, while travelling to the district of Tambo in the department of Ayacucho, to take part in political activities in the context of his candidacy for president. He was taken to a hospital but succumbed to his injuries afterwards. Three others in the car were injured in the incident and transferred to Ayacucho, with two of them in a life-threatening condition.

His party requested help from the national government to provide resources to bring Becerra's body to Lima. Marisol Guilvin, one of his party's candidates for the newly reconstituted Senate, blamed the government of the department of Ayacucho for poor road maintenance, which she blamed for the accident.

Becerra's death resulted in his party's withdrawal from the presidential list, given that Peruvian electoral law does not allow any other member of the same party to take over a presidential nomination in the case of the candidate's death.
