= Jair Manrique =

Peruvian politician (born 1997)

Member of the Chamber of Deputies
- Incumbent
- Assumed office 26 July 2026
- Constituency: Lima

Personal details
- Born: 8 April 1997 (age 29)
- Party: Ahora Nación

Bernardino Jair Manrique Olivera (born 8 April 1997) is a Peruvian politician serving as a member of the Chamber of Deputies since 2026. He previously worked as a consultant on artificial intelligence and blockchain.
