= Brígida Curo =

Peruvian politician

Brígida Curo Bustincio
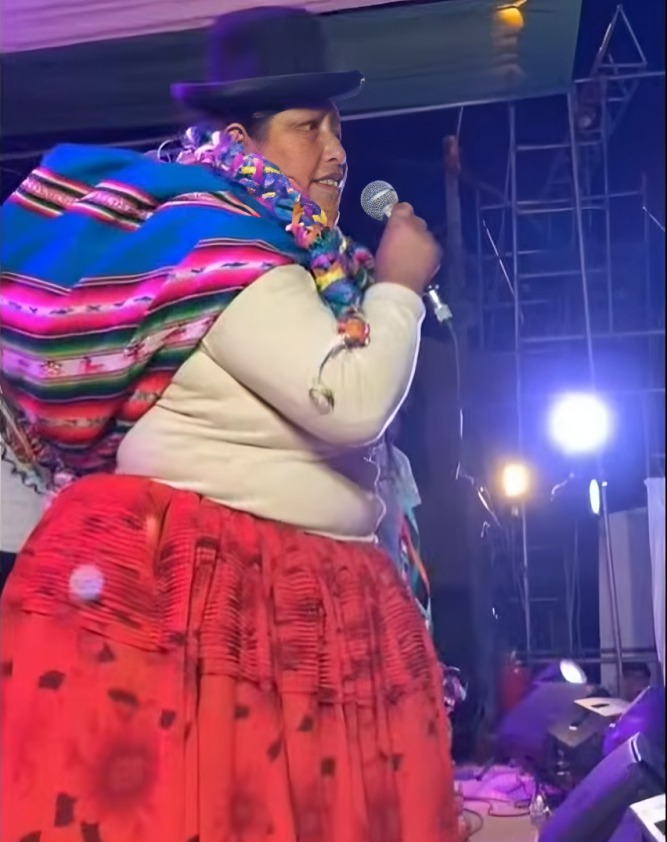
- Born: Brígida Curo Bustincio; 22 July 1976 (age 50); Capachica, Puno Department, Peru
- Occupations: Politician, farmer and rancher
- Political party: Somos Perú (1998); Broad Front (2016); Together for Peru (2021–present)

Brígida Curo Bustincio is an Indigenous Peruvian politician, farmer, and cattle rancher. Formerly a member of We Are Peru, she has been a member of the Broad Front and affiliated parties since 2016. In 2026 she was chosen as Roberto Sánchez's running mate for the 2026 Peruvian general election, additionally running for the Chamber of Deputies representing Puno.
