= Nathaly Molina =

Peruvian politician (born 1996)

Member of the Chamber of Deputies
- Incumbent
- Assumed office 26 July 2026
- Constituency: Lima

Personal details
- Born: 15 October 1996 (age 29)
- Party: Party of Good Government

Nathaly Milagros Molina Soto (born 15 October 1996) is a Peruvian politician serving as a member of the Chamber of Deputies since 2026. She previously worked as a dental surgeon at the National University of San Marcos.
