= Harvey Colchado =

Peruvian politician (born 1974)

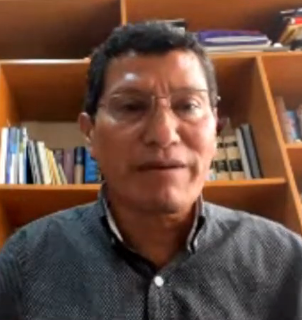
- Colchado in 2025

Second Vice President of the Chamber of Deputies
- Incumbent
- Assumed office 26 July 2026
- President: Óscar Reto
- Preceded by: Waldemar Cerrón (Note: as Second Vice President of the Congress of the Republic)

Member of the Chamber of Deputies
- Incumbent
- Assumed office 26 July 2026
- Constituency: Lima

Personal details
- Born: 11 April 1974 (age 52)
- Party: Ahora Nación (since 2025)

Harvey Julio Colchado Huamaní (born 11 April 1974) is a Peruvian politician serving as a member of the Chamber of Deputies since 2026. He has served as second vice president of the Chamber since 2026. From 2016 to 2024, he served as head of the High Complexity Crime Investigation Division of the National Police.
