= Marvin Palma =

Peruvian politician (born 1989)

Member of the Chamber of Deputies
- Incumbent
- Assumed office 26 July 2026
- Constituency: Lambayeque

Member of the Congress of the Republic
- In office 27 July 2016 – 16 March 2020
- Constituency: Lambayeque

Personal details
- Born: 26 May 1989 (age 37)
- Party: Popular Force

José Marvin Palma Mendoza (born 26 May 1989) is a Peruvian politician serving as a member of the Chamber of Deputies since 2026. From 2016 to 2020, he was a member of the unicameral Congress of the Republic.
