= Assembly of the Republic =

Assembly of the Republic can refer to:

- Assembly of the Republic (Mozambique)
- Assembly of the Republic (Northern Cyprus)
- Assembly of the Republic (Portugal)

== See also ==
- Senate of the Republic (disambiguation)
- Congress of the Republic (disambiguation)
