= Congress of the Republic =

National legislatures that formally style themselves Congress of the Republic include:

- Congress of Colombia (Congreso de la República de Colombia)
- Congress of Guatemala (Congreso de la República)
- Congress of the Republic of Peru (Congreso de la República)
- Congress of the Republic (Portugal), of the First Portuguese Republic 1910–1926

== See also ==
- Congress
- Assembly of the Republic (disambiguation)
- Senate of the Republic (disambiguation)
