= Senate of the Republic =

Senate of the Republic may refer to:

- Senate of the Republic (Italy), the Senate of the Italian Republic
- Senate of the Republic (Mexico), the Senate of the United Mexican States
- Senate of the Republic (Turkey), the former Senate of the Republic of Türkiye

== See also ==
- Assembly of the Republic (disambiguation)
- Congress of the Republic (disambiguation)
