= Rosangella Barbarán =

Peruvian politician (born 1994)

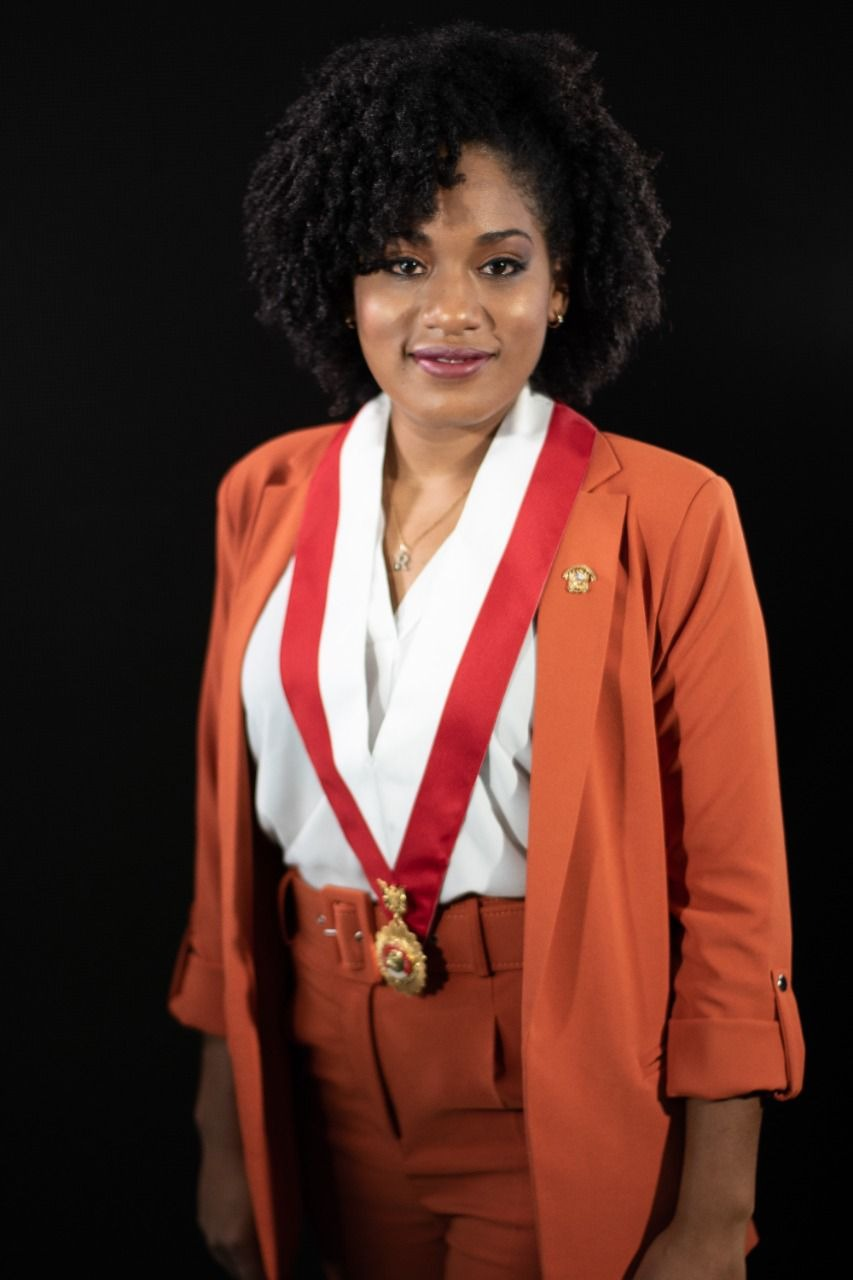
Rosangella Barbarán

Rosangella Andrea Barbarán Reyes (born August 24, 1994, Lima) is a Peruvian politician. She is a congresswoman of the republic for the period 2021–2026. She served as the president of the Economic Commission and the Bureau of Young Parliamentarians in Congress.

== Political career ==
Congresswoman of the Republic

In the 2021 general elections, she was elected congresswoman of the Republic for Fuerza Popular, with 22,574 votes, for the parliamentary period 2021–2026, becoming the youngest congresswoman.

She served as the second secretary on the Board of Directors of the Preparatory Board 2021-2026 and as the vice president of the Women and Family Commission during the 2021–2022 term.

During the 2022–2023 term, she chaired the Congressional Economics Committee, and the Congressional Young Parliamentarians Bureau.
