= José Yataco =

Peruvian politician (born 1982)

Third Vice President of the Chamber of Deputies
- Incumbent
- Assumed office 26 July 2026
- President: Óscar Reto
- Preceded by: Ilich López

Member of the Chamber of Deputies
- Incumbent
- Assumed office 26 July 2026
- Constituency: Ica

Personal details
- Born: 6 April 1982 (age 44)
- Party: Civic Party OBRAS

José Ricardo Yataco Torrealva (born 6 April 1982) is a Peruvian politician serving as a member of the Chamber of Deputies since 2026.; he has served as its third vice president for the 2026-2027 annual period.
