= Popular Renewal =

Popular Renewal Renovación Popular
- Abbreviation: RP
- President: Rafael López Aliaga
- General Secretary: Norma Yarrow
- Founder: Rafael López Aliaga
- Founded: 7 October 2020; 6 years ago
- Preceded by: National Solidarity
- Headquarters: Calle Costa Rica № 157 – Jesús María, Lima
- Membership (2026): 62,835
- Ideology: Ultraconservatism (Peruvian); Christian right; Right-wing populism; Neoliberalism (Peruvian)
- Political position: Far-right
- Colours: Sky blue
- Chamber of Deputies: 16 / 130
- Senate: 8 / 60
- Governorships: 1 / 25
- Regional Councillors: 2 / 274
- Province Mayorships: 2 / 196
- District Mayorships: 36 / 1,678

Website
- renovacionpopular.com.pe

Popular Renewal (Spanish: Renovación Popular, RP) is a far-right Peruvian political party. Founded in 2020, the party is the successor of the former National Solidarity Party founded and led by former Lima Mayor Luis Castañeda Lossio. Following its poor results at the 2020 snap parliamentary election, leader Rafael López Aliaga announced the party's re-foundation under Popular Renewal.

== History ==
As Rafael López Aliaga was elected in mid-2019 as Secretary General of National Solidarity following Luis Castañeda's resignation due to the pretrial detention on the Odebrecht scandal in Peru, the party shifted to a Christian conservative ideology and support for the current constitution of 1993. At the 2020 parliamentary election, National Solidarity received 1.5% of the popular vote, placing nineteenth out of twenty-one participating lists, thus failing to attain representation. Following its poor results in the election, the party underwent a formal reconstruction. During this period, Rafael López Aliaga formally announced his candidacy for the presidency in the 2021 general election, stating that he intended to gather all possible support from the country's conservative circles.

Under this new platform, López Aliaga announced the dissolution of National Solidarity, effectively re-founding the party under the name Popular Renewal, in October 2020. Assuming the position of party president, he stated that the party is "re-founded with principles of solidarity and anchored in God, Christ."

The party's name-change was officially recognized in December 2020. Simultaneously, López Aliaga was formally declared the party's presidential nominee for the 2021 general election, alongside Neldy Mendoza, chair of the Family and Life Institute, and Jorge Montoya, former Joint Command Chief, as his first and second running mates. López Aliaga affirmed that there will be no alliances with other political parties for those elections, he also announced that the proposals they give will be based on five axes: health, work, security, education and anti-corruption.

On Election Day, Lopez Aliaga placed third in a race of 18 candidates, while in the congressional election, the party gained 13 seats being the third most voted party and the fifth largest force in Congress.

== Ideology and position ==
Popular Renewal holds onto an ultraconservative platform, mainly based in opposition to abortion, LGBT rights, and "gender ideology". It has been described as holding a far-right, right-wing, fascist, and neo-fascist political position. Its members in the Congress of Peru have been described as being part of a "far-right" bloc allied with Go on Country and Popular Force. Internationally, the party has aligned with far-right groups, with Peruvian investigative journalism website OjoPúblico writing in an article discussing far-right alliances in the Americas that members of the far-right Spanish political party Vox travelled to Peru to obtain signatures for the anti-leftist manifesto known as the Madrid Charter, with Popular Renewal, along with the parties Go on Country of Hernando de Soto and Popular Force of Keiko Fujimori, signing the document.

López Aliaga also opposed the secret effective collaboration agreement with the Odebrecht company, considering it a "harmful issue" for the Peruvian government. He has also been against controversial businessmen such as José Graña and Jorge Barata.

== Election results ==
=== Presidential ===
Election	Candidate	First round		Second round		Result
Election	Candidate	Votes	%	Votes	%	Result
2021	Rafael López Aliaga	1,692,279	11.75			Lost ✗
2026	Rafael López Aliaga	1,993,904	11.90			Lost ✗

=== Congressional ===
==== Unicameral Congress of the Republic ====
Election	Leader	Votes	%	Congress	+/–	Rank	Government
2021	Rafael López Aliaga	1,199,705	9.33	13 / 130	▲13 (Note: Compared to PSN results in 2020)	▲5th	Minority

==== Chamber of Deputies ====
Election	Leader	Votes	%	Seats	+/–	Rank	Government
2026	Rafael López Aliaga	1,593,041	11.04	15 / 130	▲2	▲2nd	Support

==== Senate ====
Election	Leader	Votes	%	Seats	+/–	Rank	Government
2026	Rafael López Aliaga	1,633,110	11.04	8 / 60		▲2nd	Support
