= Senate of Peru =

Upper house of Peru

Senate of the Republic of Peru Senado de la República del Perú
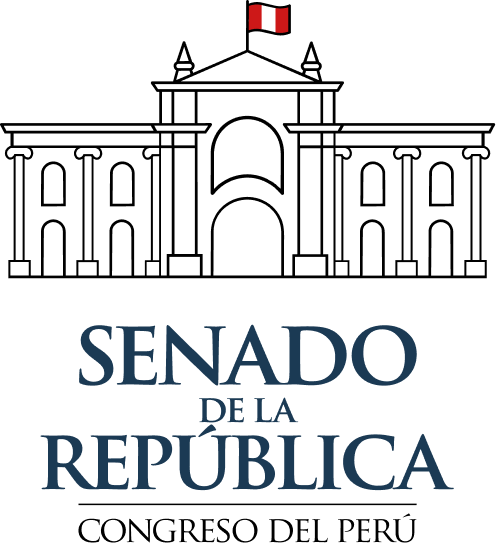

Type
- Type: Upper house

History
- Established: 1822 2026 (Re-established)
- Disbanded: 1995

Leadership
- President: Miki Torres (FP)
- First Vice President: Alejandro Muñante Barrios (RP)
- Second Vice President: Nilza Chacón Trujillo (FP)
- Third Vice President: Estanislao Mancha Pineda (RP)

Structure
- Seats: 60
- Political groups: Government (22): FP (22) (Note: FP (19); Independent (3)); Supported by (8): RP (8) (Note: RP (4); Independent (4)); Opposition (30): JP (14) (Note: JP (6); TCP (3); Independent (5)); PBG (7) (Note: PBG (5); Independent (2)); OBRAS (5) (Note: OBRAS (4); Independent (1)); AN (4) (Note: AN (1); Independent (3))

Elections
- Voting system: Parallel voting with a 5% national electoral threshold: First-past-the-post (30 seats); Party-list proportional representation (30 seats)
- Last election: 12–13 April 2026

Meeting place
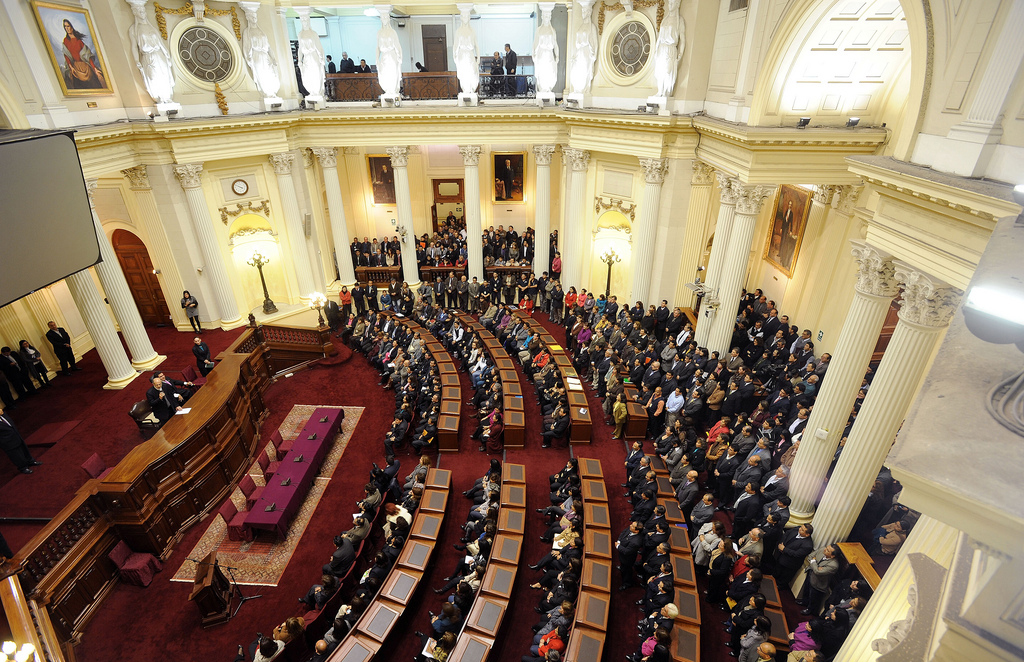
- Legislative Palace

The Senate of Peru is the upper house of the Congress of Peru, following the reinstatement of a bicameral legislature after the 2026 elections.

The Senate is made up of 60 directly-elected members who serve a five year term, contrasting with the 130-member Chamber of Deputies. It is tasked with reviewing and ratifying laws made by the Chamber of Deputies, along with appointing the director of the Central Bank and president of the Court of Auditors. Members of the Senate are either elected from the entire country as a constituency or from a multi-member constituency, with 30 seats being shared equally for the two options.

The speaker and secretary general are respectively called the President of the Senate and the Secretary General of the Senate, with Miki Torres presiding over the chamber since 26 July 2026.

Half of the seats in the Senate (along with the Chamber of Deputies) are equally divided by 50% between men and women in alternating order (man, woman, man, woman, etc) as apart of a representative quota. If one sex won a maximum of their share of seats, then voting proceed with the opposite sex.

== History ==
The Senate was dissolved in Alberto Fujimori's 1992 self-coup and, under the 1993 Constitution, the Congress of Peru became unicameral. It was re-established in 2024 after Congress voted in favour of restoring it, despite 90.52% of voters supporting the status quo of unicameralism in the 2018 referendum. 91 members of Congress voted in favour of it, 30 voted against, and one abstained.

The Senate was formerly a member of the IPU Parline between 1925–1927, 1956–1969, and 1983 under the Group of Latin America and the Caribbean (GRULAC) geopolitical group.

Historically, the Senate had its first sitting in the Museum of Congress and the Inquisition.

== See also ==
- Congress of the Republic of Peru
- Chamber of Deputies (Peru)
