= Congress of the Republic of Peru =

Bicameral legislature of Peru

Coordinates: 12°2′53″S 77°1′32″W

Congress of the Republic Congreso de la República
- 2026–2031 Period

Type
- Type: Bicameral Unicameral (1995–2026)
- Houses: Senate; Chamber of Deputies
- Established: 20 September 1822 (First Constituent Congress); 26 July 1995 (1995 Peruvian general election)

Leadership
- President of the Senate: Miki Torres, Popular Force since 26 July 2026
- President of the Chamber of Deputies: Óscar de Jesús Reto Otero (PBG) since 26 July 2026

Structure
- Seats: 60 Senators; 130 Deputies
- Senate political groups: Government (30): FP (22) (Note: FP (19); Independent (3)); RP (8) (Note: RP (4); Independent (4)); Opposition (30): JP (14) (Note: JP (6); TCP (3); Independent (5)); PBG (7) (Note: PBG (5); Independent (2)); OBRAS (5) (Note: OBRAS (4); Independent (1)); AN (4) (Note: AN (1); Independent (3))
- Chamber of Deputies political groups: Government (56): FP (41) (Note: FP (38); Movimiento Político Regional Cajamarca Renace (1); Independent (2)); RP (15) (Note: RP (14); Independent (1)); Opposition (74): JP (32) (Note: JP (16); TCP (5); Independent (11)); PBG (18) (Note: PBG (15); Independent (3)); OBRAS (14) (Note: OBRAS (11); Independent (3)); AN (10) (Note: AN (8); Independent (2))

Elections
- Senate voting system: Parallel voting with a 5% national electoral threshold: First-past-the-post voting (26 seats); Party-list proportional representation (34 seats)
- Chamber of Deputies voting system: Open list party-list proportional representation (D'Hondt method) with a 5% national electoral threshold
- Last Senate election: 12–13 April 2026
- Last Chamber of Deputies election: 12–13 April 2026

Meeting place
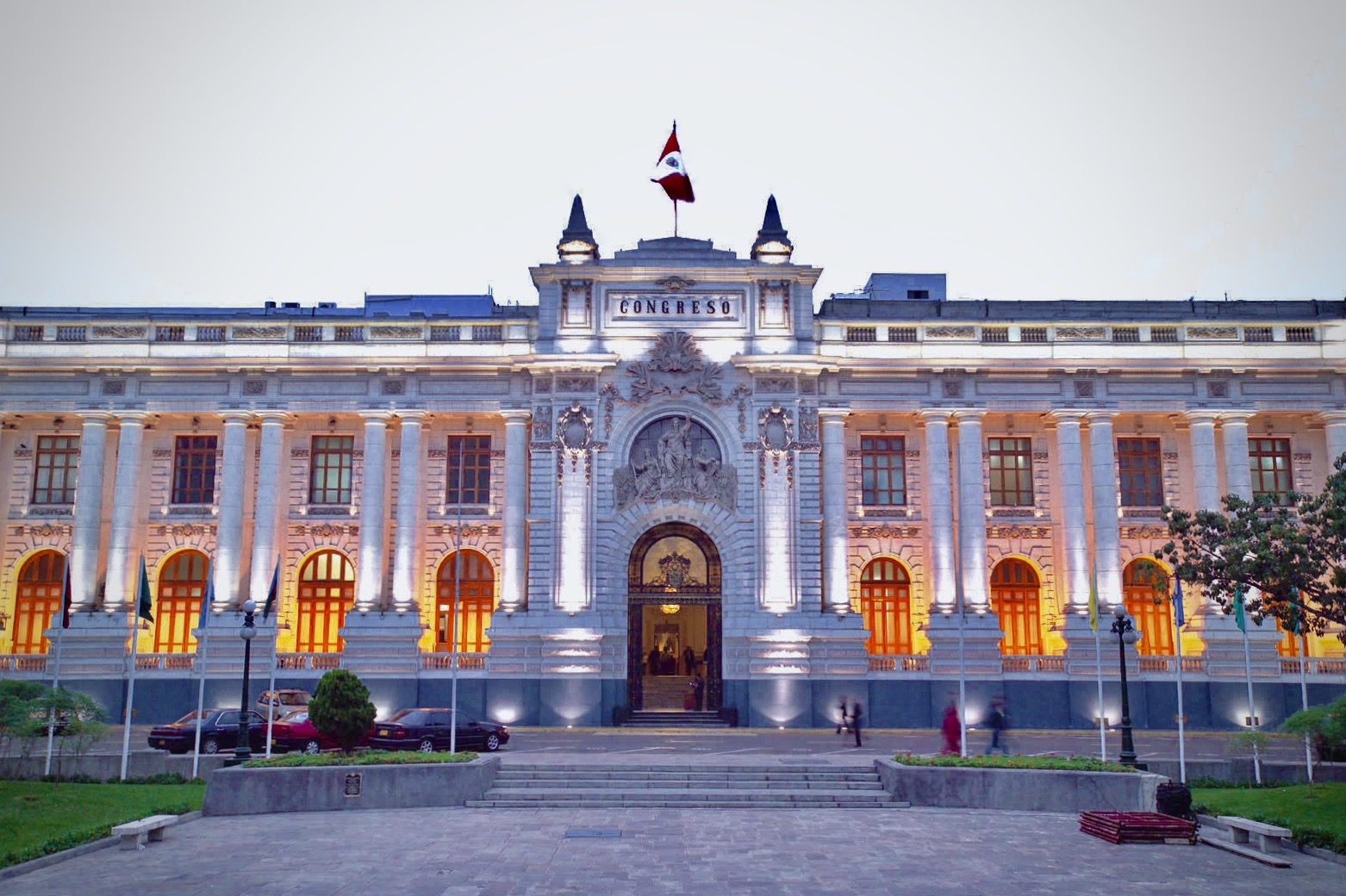
- Palacio Legislativo; Plaza Bolívar, Lima; Republic of Peru

Website
- www.congreso.gob.pe

The Congress of the Republic (Spanish: Congreso de la República) is the bicameral body which exercises legislative power in Peru. Due to the broadly interpreted impeachment wording in the Constitution of Peru, the President of Peru can be removed by Congress without cause, effectively making the legislature more powerful than the executive branch. Congress obtained nearly absolute control of Peru's government following a ruling in February 2023 when the Constitutional Court of Peru, whose members are directly chosen by Congress, removed judicial oversight of the legislative body.

Congress's composition is established by Chapter I of Title IV of the Constitution of Peru. Congress is composed of representatives who sit in congressional districts allocated to each region, as well as two special districts, Lima Province and Peruvian citizens living abroad, on a basis of population as measured by the Peruvian Census in multi-member districts.

Congress is charged with the responsibility to pass laws and legislative resolutions, as well as to interpret, amend, or repeal existing laws. Congress also ratifies international treaties, approves the national budget, and authorizes loans on behalf of the country. It may also override presidential observations to bills by a vote of more than half the legal number of congressmen. It can also remove government official including the President, consent to the entry of foreign troops into the national territory, and authorize the President to leave the country. Congress meets at the Legislative Palace in Lima.

The presiding officer is the President of Congress, who is elected by the members thereof (and is therefore traditionally the leader of the controlling party). The President and three vice-presidents are chosen by the controlling governing coalition.

== History ==
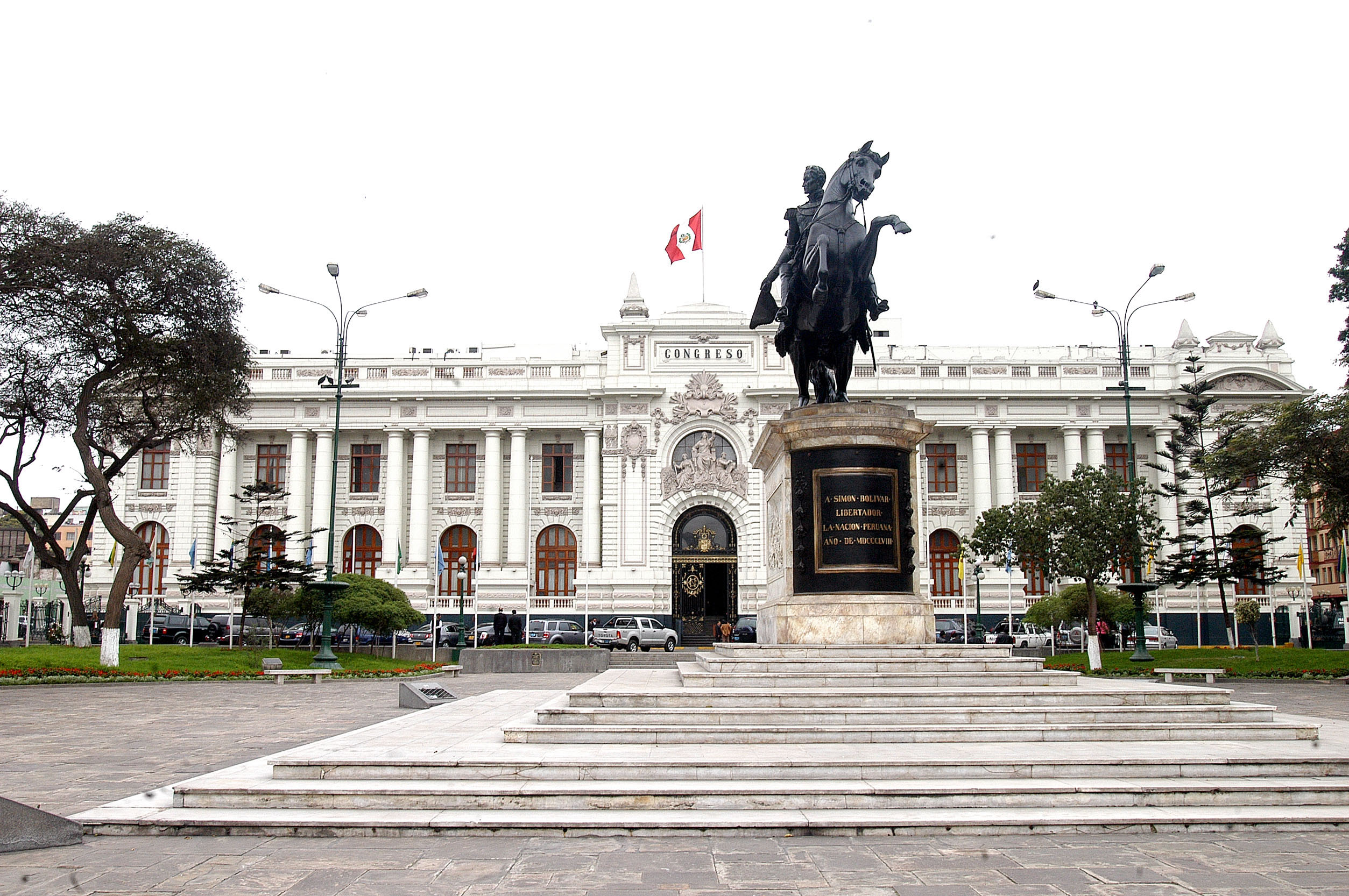
The Legislative Palace. In front of it, the famous Tadolini's Simon Bolivar statue in the Plaza Bolívar.

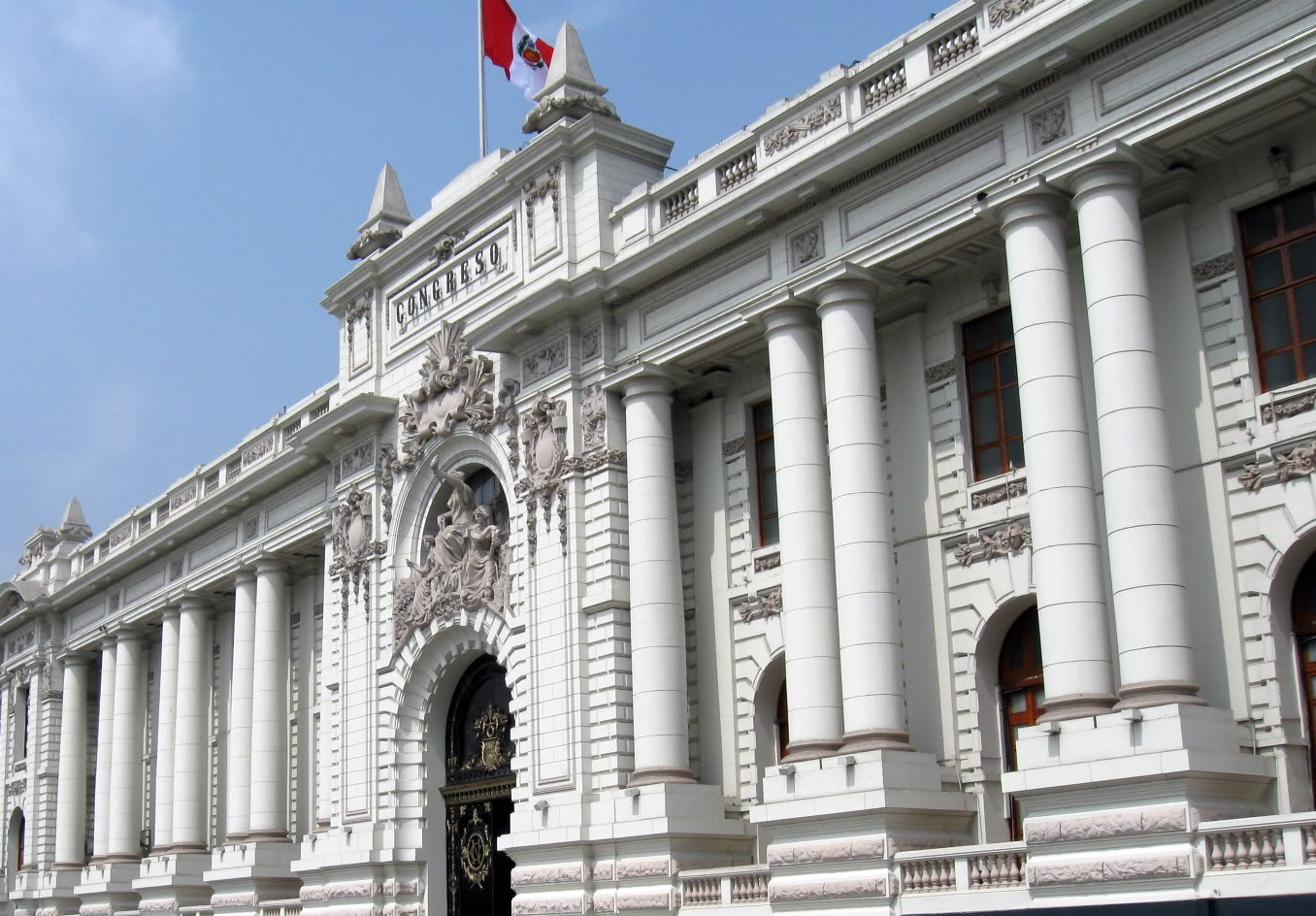
Details of the façade.

=== 19th century ===
The first Peruvian Congress was installed in 1822 as the Constitutional Congress led by Francisco Xavier de Luna Pizarro. In 1829, the government installed a bicameral Congress, made up by a Senate and a Chamber of Deputies. This system was interrupted a number of times by Constitutional Congresses that created new Constitutions every few years.

=== 20th century ===
The Deputies reunited in the Legislative Palace and the Senators went to the former Peruvian Inquisition of Lima until 1930, when Augusto B. Leguía was overthrown by Luis Miguel Sánchez Cerro. He installed a Constitutional Congress (1931–1933) that promulgated the Constitution of 1933. By order of the president, the Peruvian Aprista Party members that were in Congress were arrested for their revolutionary doctrines against the government. When Sánchez Cerro was assassinated in 1933 by an APRA member, General Óscar R. Benavides took power and closed Congress until 1939, when Manuel Prado Ugarteche was elected president. During various dictatorships, the Congress was interrupted by coups d'état. In 1968, Juan Velasco Alvarado overthrew president Fernando Belaúnde by a coup d'état, again closing Congress.

==== 1979 constitution ====
The 1979 Constitution was promulgated on 12 July 1979 by the Constitutional Assembly elected following 10 years of military rule and replaced the suspended 1933 Constitution. It became effective in 1980 with the re-election of deposed President Fernando Belaúnde. It limited the president to a single five-year term and established a bicameral legislature consisting of a 60-member Senate (upper house) and a 180-member Chamber of Deputies (lower house). Members of both chambers were elected for five-year terms, running concurrently with that of the president. Party-list proportional representation was used for both chambers: on a regional basis for the Senate, and using the D'Hondt method for the lower house. Members of both houses had to be Peruvian citizens, with a minimum age of 25 for deputies and 35 for senators.

==== Move to unicameral body ====
At the beginning of the 1990s, the bicameral congress had a low public approval rating. President Alberto Fujimori did not have the majority in both chambers; the opposition led the Congress, impeding the power that Fujimori had as president. He made the decision of dissolving Congress by a self-coup to his government in 1992. Following the self-coup, in which Congress was dissolved, the Democratic Constitutional Congress established a single chamber of 120 members. The Democratic Constitutional Congress promulgated the 1993 Constitution which gave more power to the President. The new unicameral Congress started working in 1995, dominated by Fujimori's Congressmen in the majority. The Congress permitted a one-year term for a Congressman or Congresswoman to become President of Congress.

=== 21st century ===
==== Political crisis ====
According to Walter Albán, head of Transparency International Peru, the Congress of Peru has recently been infiltrated by criminal groups that obstruct reforms in order to maintain their status and parliamentary immunity. During the presidencies of Ollanta Humala, Pedro Pablo Kuczynski and Martín Vizcarra, the right-wing Congress led by the daughter of the former Peruvian dictator Alberto Fujimori, Keiko Fujimori, obstructed much of the actions performed by the presidents. Fujimorists in Congress "earned a reputation as hardline obstructionists for blocking initiatives popular with Peruvians aimed at curbing the nation's rampant corruption" according to the Associated Press. Due to broadly interpreted impeachment wording in the Constitution of Peru (1993), Congress can impeach the president on the vague grounds of "moral incapacity", effectively making the legislature more powerful than the executive branch.

On 9 December 2018 in the 2018 Peruvian constitutional referendum promoted by President Vizcarra, voters accepted three of four of the proposals in the referendum, only rejecting the final proposal of creating a bicameral congress when Vizcarra withdrew his support when the Fujimorist-led congress manipulated the proposals contents which would have removed power from the presidency. The referendum also removed the immediate re-election of officeholders. The 2016–2021 congressional term was dissolved by President Martín Vizcarra in September 2019, triggering the 2019–2020 Peruvian constitutional crisis. Vizcarra issued a decree that set snap elections for 26 January 2020. The representatives served out the remainder of the original legislative term, which expired in July 2021. On 9 November 2020, Congress responded to Vizcarra, voting to remove him from office based on allegations of bribery.

Following the 2021 Peruvian general election, far right parties, including Go on Country, Popular Force and Popular Renewal, gained control of Congress. An alliance led by Popular Action member María del Carmen Alva successfully gained control of Peru's Congress. After left-wing presidential candidate Pedro Castillo won the presidency, Fujimori and her supporters made claims of electoral fraud, leading obstructionist efforts to overturn the election with support of citizens in Lima. From the beginning of his presidency, Castillo was targeted by Congress, whom made it clear that they wanted to remove him from office by impeachment. On 7 December 2022, Castillo attempted to dissolve Congress, arguing that the legislative body, which had obstructed many of his policies, was serving oligopolistic businesses and had colluded with the Constitutional Court of Peru to undermine the executive branch, thereby creating a "congressional dictatorship". The move was rejected by state institutions and he was removed from office and arrested.

Castillo's vice president, Dina Boluarte, assumed the presidency amid the widespread protests against her government. Following her ascension to the presidency, Boluarte aligned herself with the far-right Congress. In October 2025, Boluarte was removed from office by Congress on "moral incapacity" grounds amid mounting public anger over insecurity and corruption allegations. In his position in the order of succession, president of Congress José Jerí succeeded Boluarte, initially assumed the presidency leading into the 2026 elections. Jerí became Peru's seventh president in nine years. However, in February 2026, José Jerí was removed from office by Congress for holding undisclosed meetings with Zhihua Yang, a Chinese businessman under scrutiny from the Peruvian government. He was succeeded by José María Balcázar, who was elected by Congress to serve as president of Congress and thus made president of Peru.

==== Return to bicameralism ====
In March 2024, 91 out of 130 members of Congress voted to restore the Senate with the general election of 2026. The reconstituted Senate will have 60 members each serving a five-year term. The Senate will have the power to appoint the presidents of the Central Reserve Bank and the Court of Auditors, among other offices. The Senate will also have the power of final approval over proposed legislation and will meet with the lower chamber in a joint session to approve budgets. Unlike the lower chamber, which is elected entirely by proportional representation, the Senate will have 30 members elected from individual departmental constituencies (Lima has four seats, the others one) and the remaining 30 elected proportionately nationwide.

== Membership ==
=== Qualifications ===
Article 90 of the Peruvian Constitution sets three qualifications for congressmen: (1) they must be natural-born citizens; (2) they must be at least 25 years old; (3) they must be an eligible voter. Candidates for president cannot simultaneously run for congress while vice-presidential candidates can. Furthermore, Article 91 states that high-ranking government officers and any member of the armed forces or national police can only become congressmen six months after leaving their post.

=== Elections and term ===
Congressmen serve for a five-year term and cannot be reelected for a new term, immediately, in the same position. Elections for congress happen simultaneously as the election for president. Seats in congress are assigned to each region in proportion to the region's population. Congressional elections take place in April.

The D'Hondt method, a party-list proportional representation system, is used to allocate seats in congress. Political parties publish their party list for each region ahead of the election. Candidates do not need to be members of the political party they run for but may run for such party as a guest. Each candidate is assigned a number within the list. The citizenry thus votes for the party of their preference directly. Additionally, voters may write two specific candidates' number on the ballot as their personal preference. The newly elected congress takes office on 26 July of the year of the election.

=== Disciplinary action ===
Congressmen may not be tried or arrested without prior authorization from Congress from the time of their election until a month after the end of their term. Congressmen must follow the Congress's code of ethics, which is part of its self-imposed Standing Rules of Congress. La Comisión de Ética Parlamentaria, or Parliamentary Ethics Committee, is in charge of enforcing the code and punishing violators. Discipline consist of (a) private, written admonishments; (b) public admonishments through a Congressional resolution; (c) suspension from three to 120 days from their legislative functions.

Any congressmen may lose their parliamentary immunity if authorized by Congress. The process is started by the Criminal Sector of the Supreme Court who presents the case to the Presidency of Congress. The case is then referred to a special committee of 15 congressmen known as Comisión de Levantamiento de Inmunidad Parlamentaria, or Committee on Lifting Parliamentary Immunity, that decides if the petition should be heard by the body as a whole. The accused congressmen has the right to a lawyer and to defend himself before the committee and before the Plenary Assembly. The final decision is then communicated back to the Supreme Court.

== Salary ==
Every congressman receives a monthly salary of 15,600 Peruvian soles (approximately US$4,000). They further receive 7,617 Peruvian soles (approximately $2,100) for congressional function expenses and 2,530 Peruvian soles (approximately $700) for congressional representation week expenses to support them in their official and representational duties to their district. Each congressman further receives a 33,027 Peruvian soles (approximately $9,000) personnel allowance. Congressman also receive a one-time extra monthly salary before the beginning of their term, known as an installation expenses allowance.

== Officers ==
=== Presiding over Congress ===
==== President and Bureau ====
The most important officer is the President of Congress who is fourth in line of presidential succession if both the President and both vice-presidents are incapable of assuming the role. The President of Congress can only serve as interim president as he is required to call new elections if all three executive officers are not incapable of serving. This has happened once since the adoption of the current constitution when Valentín Paniagua became the interim president after the fall of the Alberto Fujimori regime in 2000.

The President of Congress is elected for a one-year term by the rest of Congress. Re-election is possible but uncommon. The President of Congress is almost always from the majority party. Its most important responsibility is to control and guide debate in Congress. He also signs, communicates and publishes bills and other decisions made by Congress. He may delegate any of these responsibilities to one of the vice-presidents of Congress. The president serves along three vice-presidents who are collectively known as Mesa Directiva del Congreso, known as the Bureau in English. The three vice-presidents are not always from the same party as the president. The Bureau approves all administrative functions as well as all of Congress's internal financial policy and hiring needs. Any member of the Bureau may be censored by any member of Congress.

==== Executive Council ====
El Consejo Directivo, or Executive Council, consists of the four members of the Bureau as well as representatives from each political party in Congress which are known as Executive-Spokespersons. Its composition is directly proportional to the number of seats each party holds in Congress. The council has administrative and legislative responsibilities. Similar to the United States House Committee on Rules, it sets the calendar for the Plenary Assembly and fixes floor time for debating calendar items.

==== Committees ====
Ordinary Committee	Chair(s)		Term
Agrarian	López Morales Jeny Luz	FP	2025
Science, Technology, and Innovation	Orué Medina Ariana Maybee	PP	2025
Foreign Commerce and Tourism	Zeballos Aponte Jorge Arturo	RP	2025
Constitution and Rule	Alegría García Arturo	FP	2025
Culture and Cultural Patrimony	Paredes Piqué Susel Ana María	BDP	2025
Consumer Protection and Regulatory Bodies of Public Services	Katy Ugarte Mamani	PL	2025
National Defense	Karol Ivett Paredes Fonseca	AvP	2025
Decentralization, Regionalization, Local Governments, and Modernization of State Management	Zegarra Saboya Ana Zadith	SP	2025
Economy, Banking, Finance, and Financial Intelligence	Victor Seferino Flores Ruiz	FP	2025
Education, Youth, and Sport	Segundo Toribio Montalvo Cubas	PL	2025
Energy and Mines	Cutipa Ccama Víctor Raúl	PL	2025
Supervision and Comptrollership	Elvis Vergara Mendoza	FP	2025
Social Inclusion and People with Disabilities	Arriola Tueros José Alberto	PP	2025
Intelligence	José Cueto	RP	2022–Present
Justice and Human Rights	Cruz Mamani Flavio	PL	2025
Women and Family	Milagros Jáuregui de Aguayo	RP	2025
Budget and General Account of the Republic	Soto Reyes Alejandro	APP	2025
Production, Micro and Small Businesses, and Cooperatives	Huamán Coronado Raúl	FP	2025
Andean, Amazons, and Afro-Peruvian Peoples, Environment, and Ecology	Silvana Robles	Independent	2025
Foreign Relations	Heidy Juarez	PP	2025
Health and Population	Ruíz Rodríguez Magaly Rosmery	APP	2025
Labor and Social Security	Paredes Gonzales Alex Antonio	SP	2025
Transportation and Communications	Mori Celis Juan Carlos	AP	2025
Housing and Construction	María Acuña	APP	2025

Parliamentary Ethics Committee	Chair(s)		Term
Parliamentary Ethics Committee	Elvis Vergara Mendoza	AP	2025

Subcommittee on Constitutional Accusations	Chair(s)		Term
Subcommittee on Constitutional Accusations	Lady Camones	APP	2022–present

=== Board of Spokespersons ===
Each political party in Congress chooses a Spokesperson who acts as the party leader and is a member of the Board of Spokespersons alongside the members of the Bureau. The Board of Spokespersons main role deals with committee assignments as well as the flow of bills from the committees to the Plenary Assembly.

=== Secretariat General ===
La Oficialía Mayor, or Secretariat General, is the body of personnel led by the Secretary-General. It is responsible for assisting all members of Congress with daily managerial tasks. The Secretary-General is chosen and serves under the direction of the Bureau and Executive Council.

== Committees ==
Standing Committees are in charge of the study and report of routine business of the calendar, especially in the legislative and oversight function. The President of Congress, in coordination with Parliamentary Groups or upon consultation with the Executive Council, proposes the number of Standing Committees. Each party is allocated seats on committees in proportion to its overall strength.

Most committee work is performed by 24 standing committees. They examine matters within their jurisdiction of the corresponding government departments and ministries. They may also impede bills from reaching the Plenary Assembly.

There are two independent committees, the Permanent Assembly and the Parliamentary Ethics Committee.

=== Investigative and Special Committees ===
Investigative committee are in charge of investigating a specific topic as directed by Article 97 of the Constitution. Appearances before investigative committees are compulsory, under the same requirements as judicial proceedings. Investigative committee have the power to access any information necessary, including non-intrusive private information such as tax filings and bank financial statements. Investigative committees final reports are non-binding to judicial bodies. Special committees are set up for ceremonial purposes or for the realization of special study or joint work with other government organizations or amongst congressional committees. They disband after they fulfill their assigned tasks.

=== The Permanent Assembly ===
The Permanent Assembly, or Comisión Permanente, fulfills the basic functions of Congress when it is under recess or break. It is not dissolved even if Congress is dissolved by the President. It also fulfills some Constitutional functions while Congress is in session similar to what an upper-chamber would. It has the responsibility of appointing high-ranking government officers and commencing the removal process of them as well as the heads of the two other branches of government. The Plenary Assembly may assign this committee special responsibilities excluding constitutional reform measures, approval of international treaties, organic acts, the budget, and the General Account of the Republic Act. The Assembly consist of twenty-five percent of the total number of congressmen elected proportionally to the number of seats each party holds in Congress. They are installed within the first 15 days of the first session of Congress's term.

=== Parliamentary Ethics Committee ===
Congressmen must follow the Congress's code of ethics which is part of its self-established Standing Rules of Congress. La Comisión de Ética Parlamentaria, or Parliamentary Ethics Committee, is in charge of enforcing the code and punishing violators. Discipline consists of (a) private, written admonishments; (b) public admonishments through a Congressional resolution; (c) suspension from 3 to 120 days from their legislative functions.

== Role ==
Article 102 of the Peruvian Constitution delineated ten specific functions of Congress which deal with both its legislative power as well as its role as a check and a balance to the other branches of government:

1. To pass laws and legislative resolutions, as well as to interpret, amend, or repeal existing laws.
2. To ensure respect for the Constitution and the laws; and to do whatever is necessary to hold violators responsible.
3. To conclude treaties, in accordance with the Constitution.
4. To pass the Budget and the General Account.
5. To authorize loans, in accordance with the Constitution.
6. To exercise the right to amnesty.
7. To approve the territorial demarcation proposed by the Executive Branch.
8. To consent to the entry of foreign troops into the territory, whenever it does not affect, in any manner, national sovereignty.
9. To authorize the President of the Republic to leave the country.
10. To perform any other duties as provided in the Constitution and those inherent in the legislative function.

=== Bicameral functions ===
Following the 2026 Peruvian general election, Congress will return to a bicameral legislative system was also established by Congress, which includes 130 seats for deputies and 60 seats for senators. Deputies serve as the lower house tasked with presenting legislative bills and providing oversight of the Cabinet of Peru, having a more responsibility over political objectives. Senators represent the upper house and hold more institutional control; they review bills presented by deputies and are responsible for electing the directors of the Central Reserve Bank of Peru, the members of the Constitutional Court of Peru, the Comptroller General, Ombudsman of Peru and other institutional leaders. Upper house senators also hold the power to approve certain functions of the executive, such as foreign travel, and the ability to remove the president.

== Current composition and election results ==
After widespread protests the previous year, the 2021 election saw a surge in support for the new left-wing Free Peru, which also won the presidential election with Pedro Castillo on the same day. However, a coalition of right-wing parties holds the majority of Congress and have been strongly opposed to President Castillo. One bloc of right-wing parties comprises about one-third of seats in Congress, with the bloc including the Fujimorist Popular Force, Popular Renewal of Rafael López Aliaga and Go on Country. Popular Force, which had dominated the legislature during the reign of Keiko Fujimori, regained 9 seats since their poor performance in the 2020 election, making them the second largest party. Popular Renewal party would also gain 13 seats while Go on Country won 7 seats.

The previously dominant center-right parties Popular Action and Alliance for Progress both lost some seats. The new or previously minor parties that had gained ground in the 2020 election, Purple Party, We Are Peru and Podemos Perú also all lost seats, while the Ethnocacerist Union for Peru, leftist Broad Front and Agrarian Agricultural People's Front all failed to win any seats. Contigo, the successor to former president Pedro Pablo Kuczynski's Peruvians for Change party, also failed to win a seat and continued its downwards trend of the previous election, receiving only around 0.05% of the vote.

Party	Seats
Free Peru	32
Popular Force	24
Popular Action	15
Alliance for Progress	15
Go on Country – Social Integration Party	10
Popular Renewal	9
Democratic Peru	7
Together for Peru	5
We Are Peru	5
Podemos Peru	5
Purple Party	3
Source: ONPE, Ojo Público

== Public opinion ==
Congress is one of the most disapproved entities in Peru, recently seeing its lowest approval since the early 2000s. Following the 2021 Peruvian general election, disapproval of Congress increased dramatically, from 61% in August 2021 to 91% in March 2023 according to IEP polls.

== See also ==
- Politics of Peru
- List of legislatures by country
