= Party of Good Government =

Political party in Peru

Party of Good Government Partido del Buen Gobierno
- Abbreviation: PBG
- Leader: Jorge Nieto
- President: Jorge Nieto
- Founded: 28 August 2023
- Headquarters: Lima
- Membership (2026): 38,725
- Ideology: Social liberalism; Humanism; Reformism; Progressivism
- Political position: Centre to centre-left
- Colors: Cyber yellow Red
- Chamber of Deputies: 18 / 130
- Senate: 7 / 60

Website
- partidodelbuengobierno.pe

The Party of Good Government (Spanish: Partido del Buen Gobierno) is a centrist to centre-left political party in Peru. Founded in August 2023, the party is led by sociologist Jorge Nieto, former minister of Defense and of Culture under the presidency of Pedro Pablo Kuczynski.

In 2024, the party was approved by the Peruvian electoral court, Jurado Nacional de Elecciones (JNE), to register to participate in the 2026 general election.

The party participated in the 2026 general election with Nieto as its presidential nominee. In that election, the Good Government Party placed fourth in the presidential race and won 7 Senate seats and 18 House seats, making it the fourth- and third-largest caucus, respectively, in each chamber. The party, under the leadership of Mr. Nieto, decided not to endorse either candidate in the presidential runoff between the leftist Roberto Sánchez of Together for Peru and the conservative Keiko Fujimori of Popular Force, and, instead, actively promoted invalid ballots, urging its supporters to write “We Want Good Governance” on their ballots. Nieto also questioned the “lesser evil” argument for choosing between the two candidates as problematic and argued that “the (Peruvian) left must take responsibility for the consequences of constantly choosing the lesser evil.”

== Name and symbolism ==
The party's name and Inti (Inca sun god) symbolism both alude to the 17th century illustrated chronicle El primer nueva corónica y buen gobierno, authored by Quechua nobleman Felipe Guaman Poma de Ayala. Nieto has described the chronicle as remarkably relevant to contemporary Peru, particularly for its denunciation of the enduring divide between the Indigenous and criollo worlds and its call for cultural equality and equal rights.

== Ideology and policies ==
PBG has been described as socially liberal, progressive, reformist, and humanist. Political positions range from the centre to centre-left.

It has supported same-sex marriage and loosening regulations around abortion, as well as the social market economy, and international integration into one whole economy.

== Election results ==
=== Presidential ===
| Election | Candidate | First round | | Second round | Result |
| Election | Candidate | Votes | % | Votes | Result |
|---|---|---|---|---|---|
| 2026 | Jorge Nieto | 1,837,517 | 10.98 | —N/a | Lost ✗ |

=== Congressional ===
==== Chamber of Deputies ====
| Election | Leader | Votes | % | Seats | +/– | Rank | Government |
|---|---|---|---|---|---|---|---|
| 2026 | Jorge Nieto | 1,509,987 | 10.47 | 18 / 130 | New | 4th | TBA |

==== Senate ====
| Election | Leader | Votes | % | Seats | +/– | Rank | Government |
|---|---|---|---|---|---|---|---|
| 2026 | Jorge Nieto | 1,549,920 | 10.48 | 7 / 60 | | ▲4th | TBA |
