= Ahora Nación =

Now Nation Ahora Nación
- Abbreviation: AN
- Leader: Alfonso López-Chau
- President: Luis López-Chau Pastor
- Secretary-General: Néstor Villegas Alarcón
- Founder: Alfonso López-Chau
- Founded: 10 May 2023
- Registered: 24 July 2024
- Headquarters: Lima
- Membership (2026): 81,941
- Ideology: Social democracy Left-wing nationalism Anti-Fujimorism
- Political position: Centre-left to left-wing
- Parliamentary affiliation: People's Democratic Bloc (until July 2026)
- Colours: Red; White
- Chamber of Deputies: 10 / 130
- Senate: 4 / 60
- Governorships: 1 / 25
- Regional Councillors: 0 / 274
- Province Mayorships: 0 / 196
- District Mayorships: 0 / 1,874

Website
- ahoranacion.org.pe

Ahora Nación (AN, lit. 'Now Nation') is a Peruvian social democratic political party founded on 13 May 2023, by Alfonso López-Chau, a Peruvian economist and academician, who served as rector of the National University of Engineering in 2021–2025.

AN received legal registration in the National Jury of Elections on 24 July 2024, and is registered to the 2026 general election, with López-Chau as presidential candidate.

== History ==
Ahora Nación was founded on 13 May 2023, under the leadership of Alfonso López-Chau, then Rector of the National University of Engineering (UNI). The party was formed during the 2022–2023 protests in Peru, during which López-Chau rose to prominence when he greeted protesters at the university where he served as rector.

Alfonso López-Chau announced in June 2024 his decision to run for president in the 2026 general election.

== Ideology ==
The Ahora Nación party positions itself as social democratic and nationalist. The party advocates for Peru's continued membership in the American Convention on Human Rights. It maintains a list of goals it wishes to obtain for the country:

- Consolidating a sovereign, decentralized, and corruption-free state.
- A complete reform of the education system.
- Universal healthcare system.
- Strategic industrialization of Peru.
- Strengthening intelligence systems to combat crime.
- Clean technologies in resource exploitation.
- Special focus on youth as drivers of change.

The party is described as centre-left or left-wing.

== Election results ==
=== Presidential ===
Election	Candidate	First round		Second round	Result
Election	Candidate	Votes	%	Votes	Result
2026	Alfonso López-Chau	1,221,272	7.30		Lost ✗

=== Congressional ===
==== Chamber of Deputies ====
Election	Leader	Votes	%	Seats	+/–	Rank	Government
2026	Alfonso López-Chau	1,224,556	8.49	10 / 130	New	▲5th	TBA

==== Senate ====
Election	Leader	Votes	%	Seats	+/–	Rank	Government
2026	Alfonso López-Chau	1,210,147	8.18	4 / 60		▲6th	TBA
