= Chamber of Deputies (Peru) =

Lower house of Peru

Chamber of Deputies Cámara de Diputados
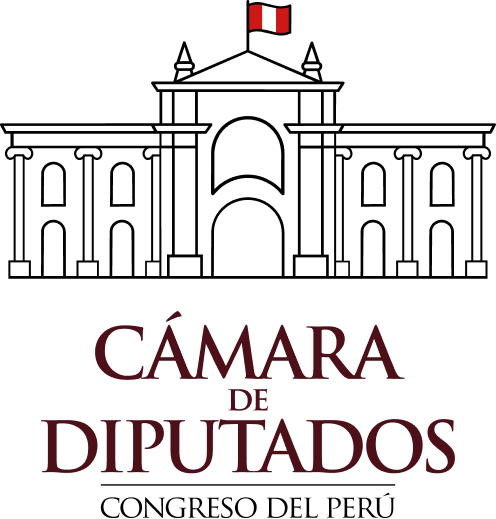

Type
- Type: Lower house

History
- Established: 1822 2026 (Re-established)
- Disbanded: 1995

Leadership
- President: Óscar de Jesús Reto Otero (PBG)
- First Vice President: Analí Márquez Huanca (JP)
- Second Vice President: Harvey Colchado (AN)
- Third Vice President: José Yataco (OBRAS)

Structure
- Seats: 130
- Political groups: Government (41): FP (41); Supported by (15): RP (15); Opposition (74): JP (32); PBG (18); OBRAS (14); AN (10)

Elections
- Voting system: Open list party-list proportional representation (D'Hondt method) with a 5% national electoral threshold
- Last election: 12–13 April 2026

Meeting place
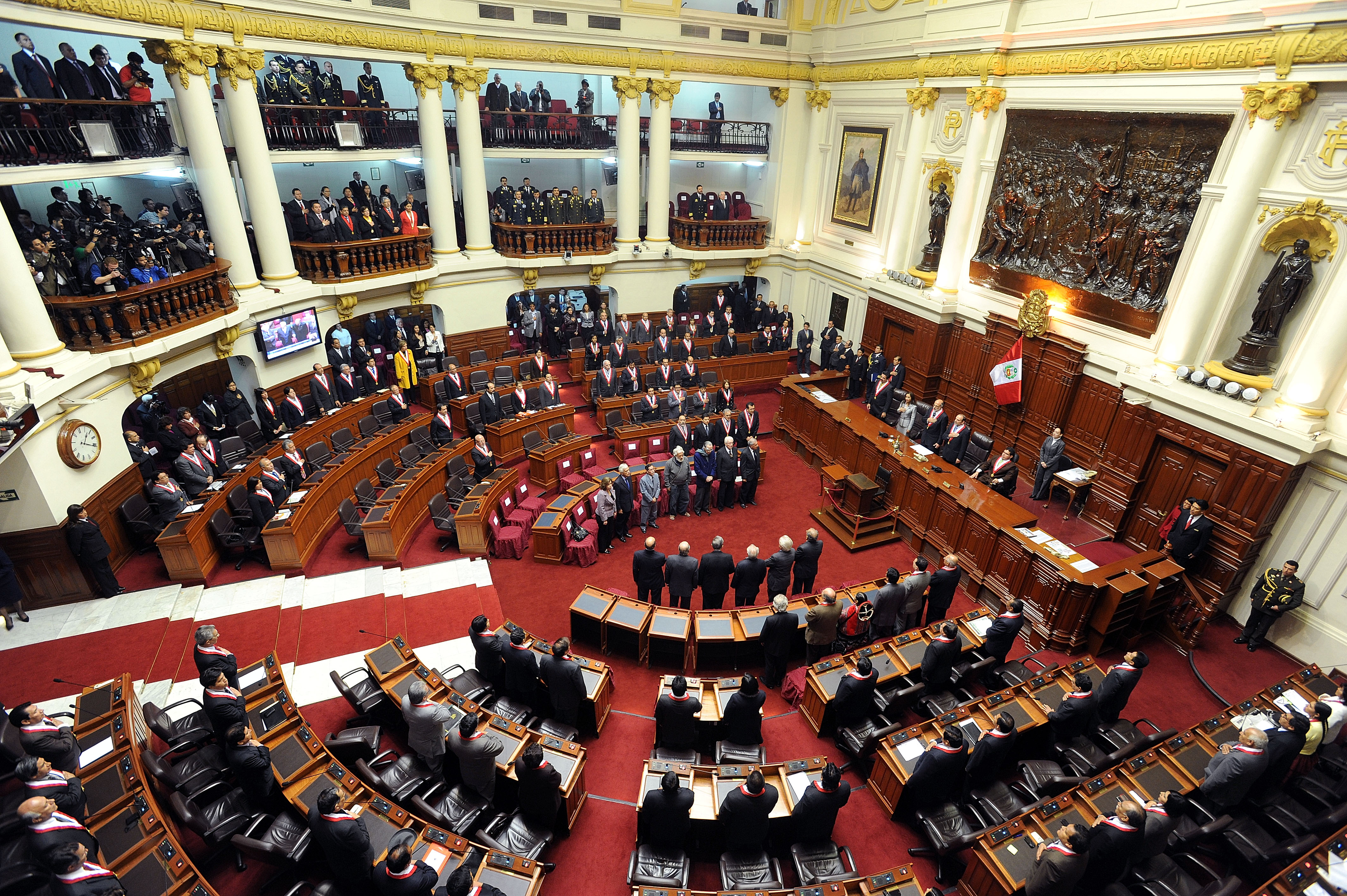
- Palacio Legislativo; Plaza Bolívar, Lima; Republic of Peru

The Chamber of Deputies of Peru is the lower house of the Congress of Peru, following the 2026 elections.

== History ==
The origins of the Chamber of Deputies can be traced to the early years of the Peruvian Republic. Throughout much of the nineteenth and twentieth centuries, Peru maintained a bicameral Congress consisting of a Senate and a Chamber of Deputies. This structure was influenced by legislative systems adopted throughout the Americas and Europe, which sought to balance popular representation with institutional review through a second chamber.

The bicameral system remained in place until 1992, when President Alberto Fujimori carried out a self-coup (autogolpe) that dissolved Congress and suspended parts of the constitutional order. Following the adoption of the 1993 Constitution, Peru replaced its bicameral legislature with a unicameral Congress. For more than three decades, legislative authority was exercised through a single parliamentary chamber.

Debates regarding the restoration of bicameralism continued throughout the following decades. Supporters argued that a second chamber would improve legislative quality, strengthen institutional oversight, and provide an additional level of review for proposed laws.After years of discussion, Congress approved constitutional reforms in 2024 that restored the Senate and Chamber of Deputies. The new bicameral legislature took office following the 2026 general elections, ending more than thirty years of unicameral government.

== Functions ==
The Chamber of Deputies is the lower house of the Congress of Peru and is responsible for representing the population through directly elected deputies. It serves as the primary chamber for the introduction, debate, and approval of legislation before bills are sent to the Senate for further review. The chamber participates in the legislative process, debates national policy, and exercises oversight of the executive branch.

In addition to its legislative responsibilities, the Chamber of Deputies holds important powers of political control. It may question, interpellate, censure, and express confidence or lack of confidence in ministers of state. The chamber also oversees the actions of public officials and government institutions through investigations and other parliamentary mechanisms.

The Chamber of Deputies is additionally responsible for initiating constitutional accusations against high-ranking state officials, including the President of the Republic, ministers, judges, prosecutors, and other senior authorities. Such accusations are subsequently considered by the Senate, which acts as the chamber responsible for conducting political trials and issuing final decisions.

== Composition ==
The Chamber of Deputies is composed of deputies elected by popular vote from electoral districts corresponding to Peru's regions and the Constitutional Province of Callao. Deputies serve five-year terms concurrent with the presidential term and may seek re-election in accordance with constitutional and electoral laws.

Under the bicameral system restored by the 2024 constitutional reform, the Chamber of Deputies consists of 130 members, while the Senate is composed of 60 senators. Seats in the Chamber are distributed among electoral districts based primarily on population, ensuring representation for all regions of the country.

The composition of the chamber may change following each general election, reflecting the distribution of seats among political parties and electoral alliances. Deputies represent both their respective constituencies and the nation as a whole, participating in legislative debates, committee work, and oversight activities within Congress.

== See also ==
- Congress of the Republic of Peru
