= Pedro Cateriano =

Peruvian politician (born 1958)

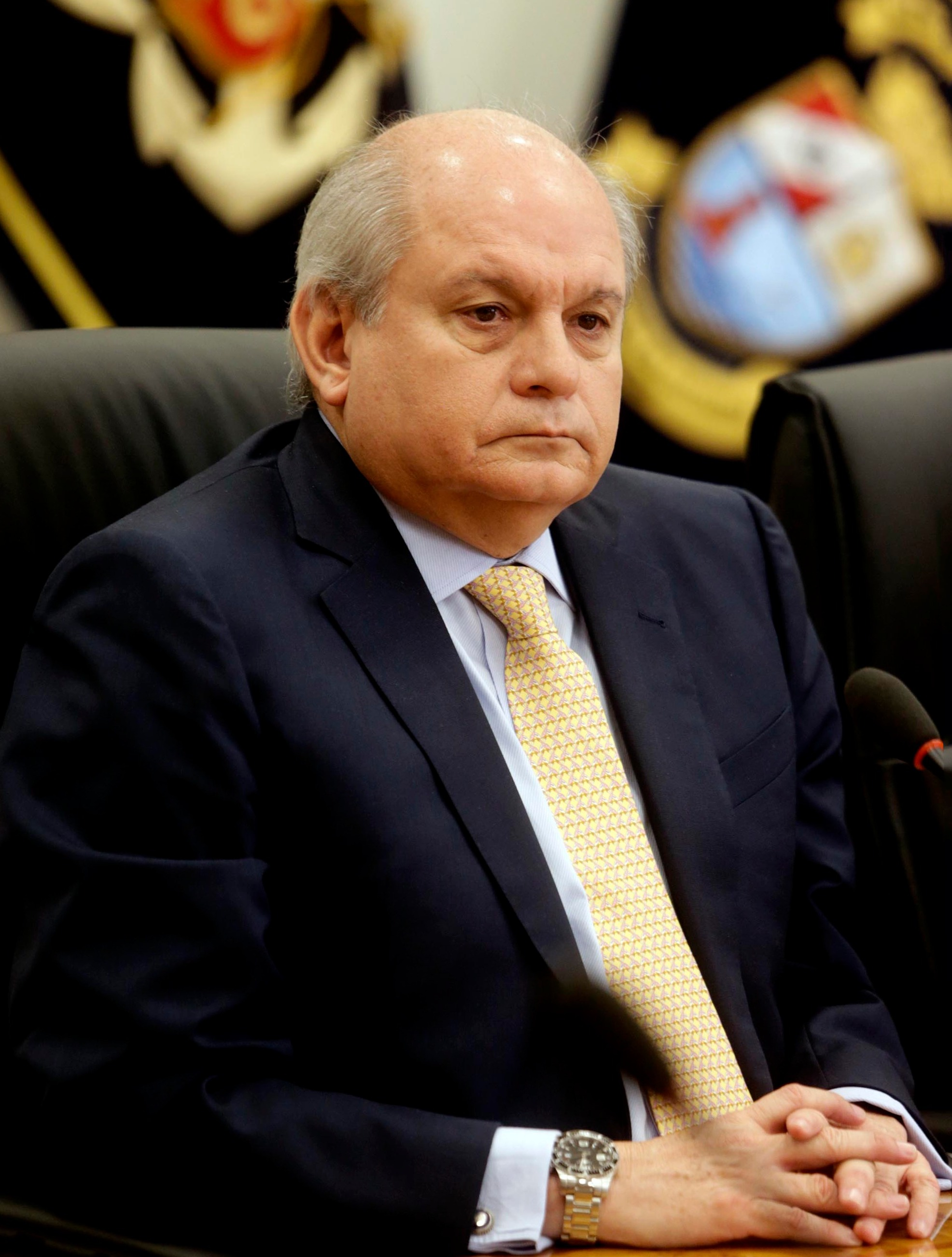

Prime Minister of Peru
- In office 15 July 2020 – 6 August 2020
- President: Martín Vizcarra
- Deputy: Diana Álvarez-Calderón
- Preceded by: Vicente Zeballos
- Succeeded by: Walter Martos
- In office 2 April 2015 – 28 July 2016
- President: Ollanta Humala
- Deputy: Manuel Mesones Castelo
- Preceded by: Ana Jara
- Succeeded by: Fernando Zavala

Minister of Defense
- In office 23 July 2012 – 2 April 2015
- President: Ollanta Humala
- Prime Minister: Juan Jiménez Mayor; César Villanueva; René Cornejo; Ana Jara
- Preceded by: José Antonio Urquizo
- Succeeded by: Jakke Valakivi

Deputy Minister of Justice
- In office 28 July 2001 – 21 June 2002
- President: Alejandro Toledo
- Prime Minister: Roberto Dañino
- Minister: Fernando Olivera
- Preceded by: Juan Jiménez Mayor
- Succeeded by: Alfredo Antonio Solf Montalve

Member of the Chamber of Deputies
- In office 26 July 1990 – 5 April 1992
- Constituency: Lima

Personal details
- Born: 26 June 1958 (age 68) Lima, Peru
- Party: People's Liberty (2022–present)
- Other political affiliations: Independent (until 1987, 1993–2020); All for Peru (2020–2021); Liberty Movement (1987–1993)
- Education: Pontifical Catholic University of Peru (LLB); Complutense University (PhD)

Pedro Álvaro Cateriano Bellido (born 26 June 1958) is a Peruvian lawyer and politician who served as Prime Minister of Peru from July to August 2020, under Martín Vizcarra's administration. He previously served as Ollanta Humala's minister of defense from July 2012 to April 2015, and prime minister from April 2015 to July 2016.

Born in the capital city of Lima in 1958, Cateriano pursued a law degree at the Pontifical Catholic University of Peru, specializing in constitutional law. During his brief term in the Peruvian Congress between 1990 and 1992, Cateriano attained a prominent role as a ranking member of the congressional investigative committee on Alan García's first administration (1985–1990). Alongside Lourdes Flores and Fernando Olivera, the committee was ultimately disbanded following García's acquittal by the Supreme Court in March 1992. Cateriano published in the following years a detailed work on the investigation.

After a failed run for the Peruvian Congress, Cateriano worked extensively in opposition to Alberto Fujimori's presidency, ultimately being appointed to the Constitutional Reform Advisory Body of the Ministry of Justice in the presidency of Valentín Paniagua. Subsequently, he was appointed under Alejandro Toledo's presidency as Deputy Minister of Justice, serving until his resignation in June 2002, alongside minister and former colleague, Fernando Olivera.

During the presidency of Ollanta Humala, Cateriano served as Minister of Defense from July 2012 to April 2015. In his almost three-year tenure, he remained a controversial member of Humala's administration, constantly clashing with the opposition regarding the government's modus operandi, in which First Lady Nadine Heredia seemingly interfered with government decisions. He also faced criticism for his support of pecuniary sanctions on voluntary military service enrollment, which the Constitutional Court declared the measure unconstitutional. Upon the resignation of Ana Jara on 2 April 2015, due to her being censured by the Peruvian Congress regarding illegal government espionage under her management as Prime Minister of Peru, Cateriano was appointed as her successor. Seemed by pundits as a government loyalist, he served through the end of Humala's presidency.

Cateriano was sworn as Prime Minister of Peru on 15 July 2020, succeeding Vicente Zeballos as the government faces strong criticism due to Vizcarra's management of the COVID-19 pandemic in Peru. He would serve until 4 August 2020, less than three weeks in office, as Congress voted against his confirmation and left office on 6 August 2020.

== Early life and education ==
Cateriano was born in Lima on 26 June 1958. He is the son of Pedro Cateriano Delgado, from Arequipa, and Clara Bellido Delgado. His great-uncle, Army colonel Andrés Neptali Cateriano y Alcalá, served as Minister of War and Navy during the government of José Pardo y Barreda.

Upon finishing his high school education at the Colegio de la Inmaculada, from which he graduated in 1975, Cateriano entered the Pontifical Catholic University of Peru, where he studied law. He also has doctoral studies at the Ortega y Gasset University Research Institute, attached to the Complutense University of Madrid, specializing in constitutional law. His professional experience covers legal, pedagogical, business and political areas.

== Political career ==
Cateriano entered the political scene as he was slated for a seat in the Peruvian Congress for Lima with the Liberty Movement, the only political party in which he has been registered, led by Mario Vargas Llosa, serving from 1990 to 1992, which was dissolved by President Alberto Fujimori. During his parliamentary tenure, Cateriano was a member of the Constitution and Foreign Relations committees, and the Permanent Assembly of Congress. He gained prominence as member of the Investigative Committee of the First presidency of Alan García, alongside Lourdes Flores and Fernando Olivera. In his published work The García Case, Cateriano details said investigation, the same that motivated Congress to accuse García of illicit enrichment (for issues such as that of the BCCI and the Mirage aircraft), but which the former president was initially declared innocent by the Supreme Court in 1992, and when reopened they were never resolved judicially, until they finally prescribed.

Following the dissolution of Congress in 1992, Cateriano was invited by Fernando Olivera to regain his seat in the new unicameral body at the 1995 general election, but was not elected, attaining a low share of votes nationally.

Upon the inauguration of Valentín Paniagua as President of Peru in November 2000 following the downfall of Alberto Fujimori, Cateriano was appointed to the Advisory Commission of the Ministry of Justice for Constitutional Reform. Simultaneously, he represented Peru before the Committee of Experts of the Follow-up Mechanism of the Inter-American Convention against Corruption.

In July 2001, Cateriano was appointed Deputy Minister of Justice by President Alejandro Toledo. He served in the ministry under the management of Fernando Olivera until June 2002.

After ten years dedicated extensively to the private sector between 2002 and 2012, Cateriano was appointed agent of the Peruvian State before the Inter-American Court of Human Rights in February 2012, for the Chavín de Huántar case, defending the government's version that there were no executions during the release of the hostages from the residence of the Japanese ambassador in 1997.

=== Minister of Defense ===
Cateriano was appointed Minister of Defense on 23 July 2012, under cabinet led by Juan Jiménez Mayor, succeeding congressman José Antonio Urquizo in the position. At the start of his tenure, Cateriano declared his interest in promoting of voluntary military service, although the Constitutional Court declared that the draw for military service was not unconstitutional.

==== Controversies ====
On 14 July 2013, a Peruvian journalistic program revealed a telephone recording in which Cateriano tells an interlocutor that First Lady Nadine Heredia, gave him the "green light" to make some purchases for the Defense sector through the United Nations Development Programme. The dialogue revealed to the local press an alleged interference of Ollanta Humala's wife in government decisions; however, Cateriano argued that Heredia only "transmits the president's messages". An expert report from the National Police of Peru stated that the audio is inaudible in various parts and would have been edited. The Prosecutor's Office twice closed the investigations into an alleged arms purchase. The United Nations Development Programme ultimately ratified Cateriano's version.

In December 2012, the Executive Branch issued Legislative Decree 1146, which modified the Military Service Law, and established in its article 50 that "those chosen by lottery are required to appear within the indicated period" for the selection process; that those who are selected are obliged to appear within the indicated period to join the quartered service and that the draws with serious and permanent physical or mental disabilities, those deprived of their liberty, those who prove to be responsible for the maintenance of the home, the university students, who prove they are providing some voluntary service to the community and residents abroad. The Constitutional Court later ruled that the draw was not contrary to the Constitution. This within the framework of the powers granted by the Legislative to the Executive to legislate in matters of Defense and Interior.

In this regard, members of the opposition harshly questioned the aforementioned decree for discriminating against the poorest and for making the Military Service "mandatory" for those who cannot pay this amount (approximately US$720). Congress debated that said provision promoted by Cateriano was illegal, since being a voluntary service, a pecuniary sanction cannot be imposed on those do not wish to do so.

=== Premiership ===
==== First Premiership (2015–2016) ====
On 2 April 2015, President Ollanta Humala appointed Cateriano as Prime Minister after his predecessor, Ana Jara was censured for spying against lawmakers, reporters, business leaders and other citizens. On 27 April 2015, he and his cabinet won the congressional confidence vote. As part of the presidential transition from Humala to Pedro Pablo Kuczynski, Cateriano resigned as Prime Minister on 28 July 2016.

==== Second Premiership (2020) ====
On 15 July 2020, President Martín Vizcarra announced the recomposition of his government amidst the criticism of Vicente Zeballos' management of the COVID-19 pandemic in Peru. Cateriano accepted Vizcarra's invitation to form a new cabinet, and was sworn in as Zeballos' successor. A few days earlier, Cateriano had resigned to the advisory body of the congressional Constitution Committee following Congress' harshly criticized amendments to the Constitution regarding immunity for public officials.

Following his oath of office, Cateriano met with the congressional leaders Manuel Merino and Luis Valdez Farías, in order to request a vote of confidence for his ministerial cabinet before 28 July - a request that was not it would grant him, until 3 August - and discuss public affairs in the context of the health emergency caused by the new coronavirus. On 4 August, this request was rejected with 54 votes against, 37 in favor and 34 abstentions. For this reason, with only twenty days in office, Cateriano tendered his resignation to President Martín Vizcarra. He was succeeded by Walter Martos, a Peruvian Army general who had been serving as minister of defense since October 2019.

=== Post-premiership ===
On 14 November 2022, Cateriano announced that his new political party, People's Liberty, had requested its registration as a party from the National Jury of Elections. It currently has 32,464 members and 76 committees in all 25 of Peru's regions.

Political offices
Preceded by José Antonio Urquizo	Minister of Defense; 2012–2015	Succeeded by Jakke Valakivi
Preceded by Ana Jara	Prime Minister of Peru; 2015–2016	Succeeded by Fernando Zavala
Preceded by Vicente Zeballos	Prime Minister of Peru; 2020	Succeeded by Walter Martos
