= Aída García Naranjo =

Peruvian educator, singer, and politician

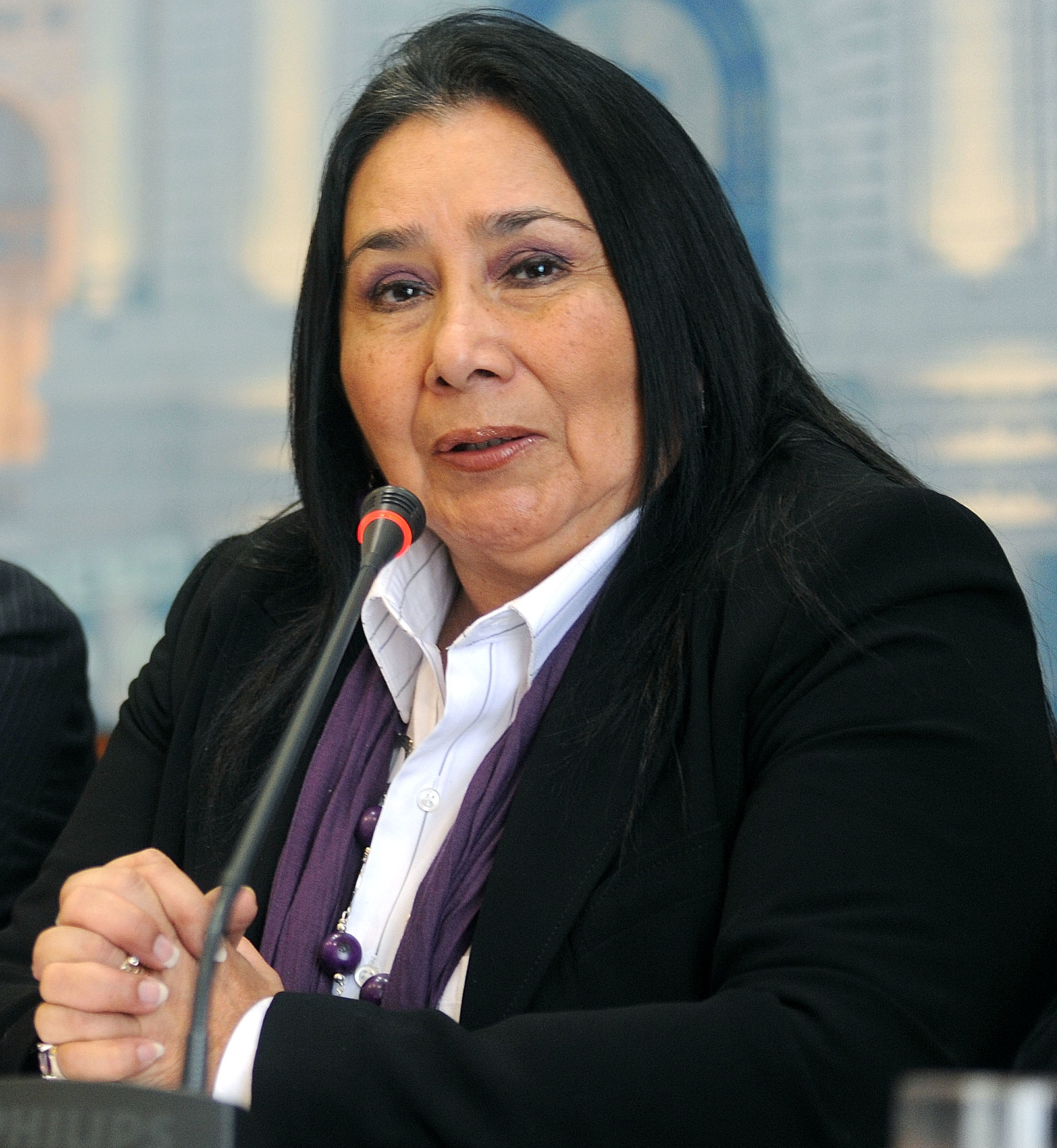

Ambassador of Peru to of Uruguay
- In office 5 January 2012 – 18 June 2014
- Succeeded by: David Teodoro Arzubiaga Scheuch

Minister of Women and Social Development
- In office 28 July 2011 – 10 December 2011
- President: Ollanta Humala
- Preceded by: Virginia Borra
- Succeeded by: Ana Jara

Representative of Peru to Mercosur
- In office 1 February 2012 – 18 June 2014
- President: Ollanta Humala

Representative of Peru to ALADI
- In office 1 February 2012 – 18 June 2014
- President: Ollanta Humala

Personal details
- Born: Aída del Carmen Jesús Consuelo García-Naranjo Morales; 20 March 1951 (age 75) Peru
- Party: Socialist Party
- Education: Pontifical Catholic University of Peru
- Occupation: Educator, singer, politician
- Nickname: Mocha

Aída del Carmen Jesús Consuelo García-Naranjo Morales (born 20 March 1951), also known by her nickname "Mocha", is a Peruvian educator, singer, and politician, the former Secretary General of the Socialist Party and spokesperson of Gana Perú, the alliance of former President Ollanta Humala.

She was the first Minister of Women and Social Development in the Humala government.

She served as the ambassador of Peru to Uruguay from January 2012 to June 2014. Since February 2012, she has also been the Peruvian representative to Mercosur and the Latin American Integration Association (ALADI).

== Biography ==
Aída García Naranjo studied education at the Pontifical Catholic University of Peru. She also has a master's degree in political science and government from the same university and two diplomados – in "Migrations, Globalization, and International Relations" and "Economic, Social, and Cultural Rights" – from Cayetano Heredia University.

She was a councilor of the Municipality of Metropolitan Lima from 1990 to 1993. She was director of Mujeres Magazine from 1995 to 2011, and since 2011 she has been the executive director of the Center for Rights and Development (CEDAL).

She has been a member of the Consultative Council of the Peasant Confederation of Peru, advises the Secretariat of Women's Affairs, and also advised the National Women's Mining Center from 2002 to 2008.

She is a member of "Espacios Sin Fronteras" (UNASUR's migrations network) and Honorary Cultural Attaché of the Embassy of the Republic of Nicaragua in Peru. She was an officer of the General Peru-Canada Countervalue Fund.

She is also a member of the musical group Tiempo Nuevo, and graduated from the National Conservatory of Music.

She is the author of 14 books, many of them on feminism in Peru. Among her works are Nosotras las mujeres del Vaso de Leche, Construyendo la equidad: El futuro como tarea, Hombres y mujeres de igual a igual, Mujer Peruana Situación Nacional, La plataforma nacional de la Mujer Peruana, and Mujeres Notables 1900–2010.

== Minister of Women ==
She became the head of the Ministry of Women and Social Development on 28 July 2011.

== PRONAA scandal ==
On 20 September 2011, three children were poisoned and died after eating food from the National Food Assistance Program (PRONAA), a body under the Ministry of Women and Social Development. Hours later García Naranjo continued with activities to celebrate one of the institutions (for which she would later apologize). Afterward the parliamentarians of Force 2011 criticized the minister's inaction and asked for her interpellation, which was not supported by the other parliamentary groups. Days later six other children and a teacher were sickened by food from the same institution.

García Naranjo presented herself to the Congress of the Republic on 6 October, and on 13 October, the body rejected the motion of censure against her.

== See also ==
- Humala administration
