= Marcela Huaita Alegre =

Peruvian lawyer (born 1964)

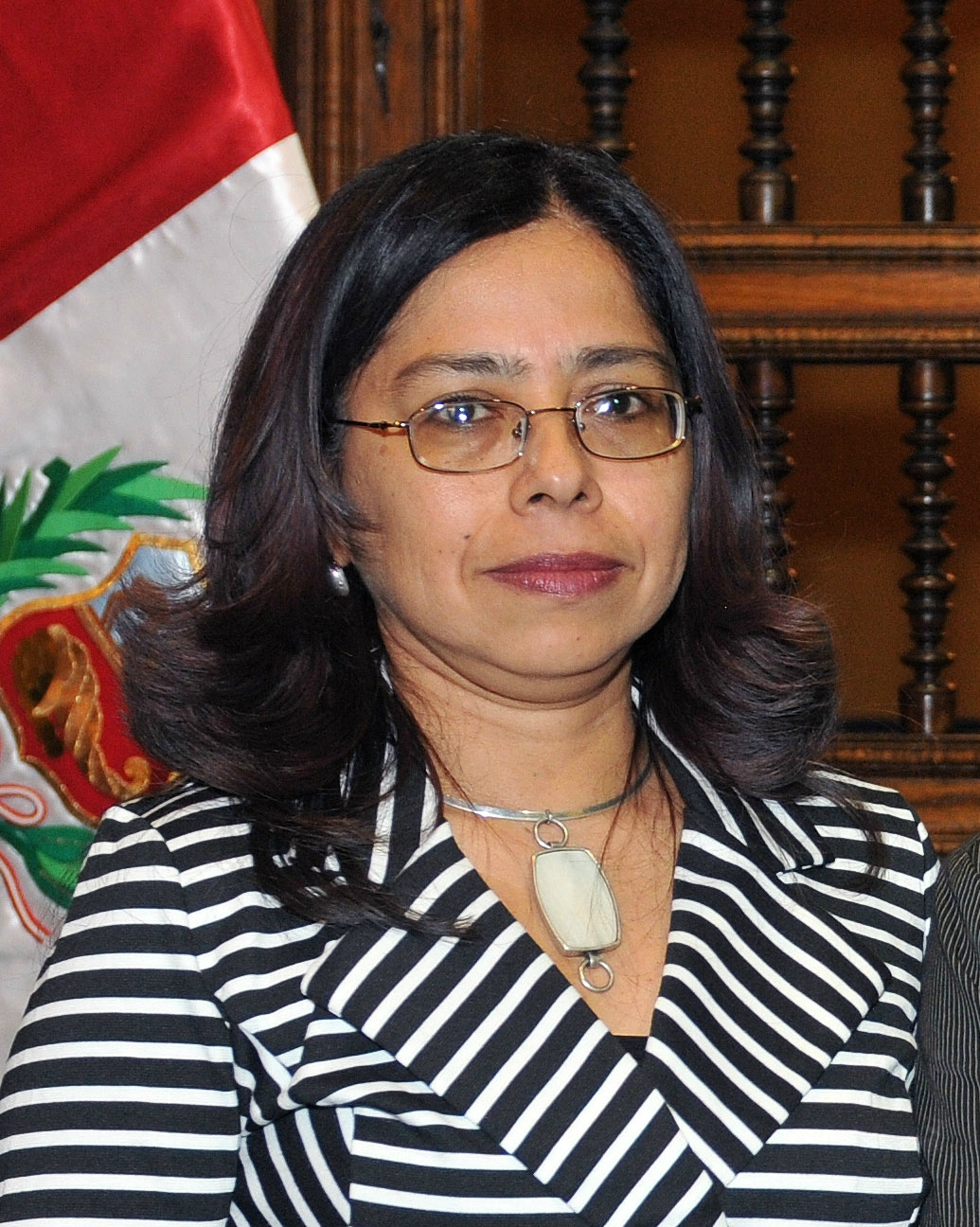

Minister of Women and Vulnerable Populations
- In office 17 February 2015 – 28 July 2016
- President: Ollanta Humala
- Preceded by: Carmen Omonte Durand
- Succeeded by: Ana María Romero-Lozada

Personal details
- Born: 30 October 1964 (age 61)
- Education: Pontifical Catholic University of Peru
- Occupation: Lawyer, academic

Marcela Patricia María Huaita Alegre (born 30 October 1964) is a Peruvian lawyer and academic specialized in human rights and public policy. She was Minister of Women and Vulnerable Populations from 17 February 2015 until 28 July 2016 under president Ollanta Humala.

== Life ==
Huaita went to law school at the Pontifical Catholic University of Peru (PUCP).

Huaita was an instructor of human rights, gender studies, and public policy at the PUCP and the National University of San Marcos.

In 1996, Huaita became the lead advisor of the Commission of Women to the Congress of the Republic of Peru. In 2003, she joined the cabinet of advisor of the President of the Council of Ministers of Peru (PCM). From 2012 to 2013, Huaita was the vice minister of women under Ana Jara. She became secretary general of the Ministry of Women and Vulnerable Populations (MIMP). In this role, Huaita worked for institutions including Pro Ethics, Ombudsman's office, and Constella Futures.

On 17 February 2015, Huaita succeeded Carmen Omonte Durand as Minister of the MIMP under president Ollanta Humala. The swear in ceremony was held in the Golden Hall. In her role, she managed and lead legal advancements to protect victims of violence including femicide, laws to prevent, punish, and eradicate violence against women and family members, and the adoption of the gender violence 2016 to 2021 plan. Huaita highlighted the expansion of emergency women's shelters to a total of 245 nationwide. She served as minister until the end of Humala's presidency on 28 July 2016. Huaita was succeeded by Ana María Romero-Lozada.
