= Ángela Hernández Cajo =

Peruvian lawyer and politician

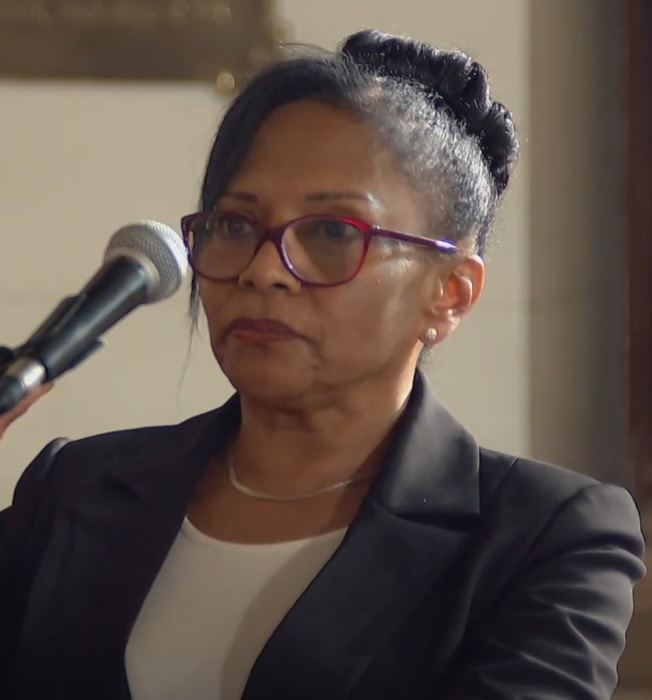

Minister of Women and Vulnerable Populations
- Incumbent
- Assumed office 1 April 2024
- President: Dina Boluarte
- Prime Minister: Gustavo Adrianzén
- Preceded by: Nancy Tolentino Gamarra

Personal details
- Born: Ángela Teresa Hernández Cajo; 30 June 1961 (age 64) Lima, Peru
- Party: Somos Perú (2004-2024)
- Education: National University of San Marcos

Ángela Teresa Hernández Cajo (Lima, June 30, 1961) is a Peruvian lawyer and politician. She is the current Minister of Women and Vulnerable Populations in the government of Dina Boluarte, as of April 1, 2024.

== Studies ==
Ángela Hernández Cajo studied Law and Political Science at the National University of San Marcos (1978–1986). At the same university, she completed a master's degree in law with a mention in Criminal Sciences (1991–1993).

== Career ==
Her career has focused on the defense of women's rights and the fight against gender violence. She has held various positions in the Ministry of Women and Vulnerable Populations, including national coordinator of Women's Emergency Centers, executive director of the National Program against Family and Sexual Violence, general director of the General Directorate of Family and Community (2013–2016), and advisor of the Vice Ministry of Women (2023–2024).

She was alternate representative of her country on the OAS Committee of Experts on the Convention of Belem do Para or Inter-American Convention on the Prevention, Punishment and Eradication of Violence against Women. She was also an expert commissioner on women's human rights at the Ombudsman's Office (2009–2013).

She was a member of the Somos Peru party from 2004 until her resignation in 2024.

Minister of Women

On April 1, 2024, Ángela Hernández was appointed the new Minister of Women and Vulnerable Populations by President Dina Boluarte, replacing Nancy Tolentino Gamarra, as part of the ministerial cabinet chaired by Gustavo Adrianzén.

== See also ==
- Lourdes Alcorta
- Anahí Durand
