= Presidency of Ollanta Humala =

Peruvian presidency from 2011 to 2016

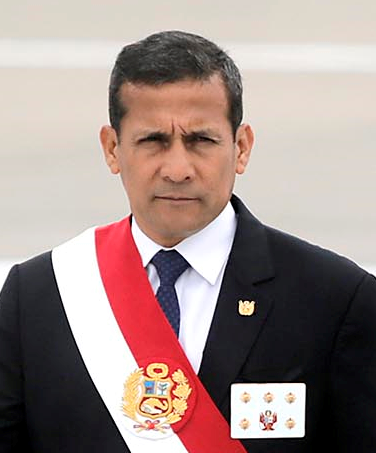
- Presidency of Ollanta Humala; 28 July 2011 – 28 July 2016
- Vice President: Marisol Espinoza, Omar Chehade (until 2012)
- Cabinet: See list
- Party: Peruvian Nationalist Party
- Election: 2011
- Seat: Palacio de Gobierno
- Standard of the President

Ollanta Humala began his presidency when he was sworn into the office of President of the Republic of Peru on 28 July 2011. On the same day, he represented his cabinet, headed by the non-partisan Salomón Lerner Ghitis. On 10 December 2011, Lerner stepped down, following fierce protests against a mining project. He was replaced by Interior Minister Oscar Valdés. The next day, Valdés presented a new cabinet, replacing eleven ministers.

Humala's Second Vice President Omar Chehade was temporarily suspended by Congress on 5 December 2011, facing corruption allegations. On 16 January 2012, Chehade resigned permanently.

== First Cabinet ==
Cabinet of Peru from 28 July to 11 December 2011
Position	Name
President of the Republic	Ollanta Humala (PNP)
First Vice President	Marisol Espinoza (PNP)
Second Vice President	Omar Chehade (temporarily impeached on 5 December)
Prime Minister	Salomón Lerner
Minister of Foreign Relations	Rafael Roncagliolo
Minister of Defense	Daniel Mora (PP)
Minister of Agriculture	Miguel Caillaux
Minister of Labour and Promotion of Employment	Rudecindo Vega (PP)
Minister of Women and Social Development	Aída García-Naranjo (PS)
Minister of Economy and Finance	Miguel Castilla
Minister of Transportation and Communications	Carlos Paredes Rodríguez
Minister of Housing, Construction and Sanitation	René Cornejo
Minister of Foreign Commerce and Tourism	José Luis Silva Martinot
Minister of Production	Kurt Burneo (PP)
Minister of Health	Alberto Tejada Noriega
Minister of Energy and Mines	Carlos Herrera Descalzi
Minister of Education	Patricia Salas
Minister of the Interior	Oscar Valdés
Minister of Justice	Francisco Eguiguren
Minister of Environment	Ricardo Giesecke
Minister of Culture	Susana Baca
Minister of Development and Social Inclusion	Kurt Burneo (PP)

== Second Cabinet ==
Cabinet of Peru since 14 May 2012
Position	Name
President of the Republic	Ollanta Humala
First Vice President	Marisol Espinoza
Second Vice President	Omar Chehade (temporarily impeached on 5 December 2011, resigned on 16 January 2012)
Prime Minister	Oscar Valdés
Minister of Foreign Relations	Rafael Roncagliolo
Minister of Defense	José Urquizo
Minister of Agriculture	Luis Ginocchio
Minister of Labour and Promotion of Employment	José Villena
Minister of Women and Social Development	Ana Jara
Minister of Economy and Finance	Miguel Castilla
Minister of Transportation and Communications	Carlos Paredes Rodríguez
Minister of Housing, Construction and Sanitation	René Cornejo
Minister of Foreign Commerce and Tourism	José Luis Silva Martinot
Minister of Production	Gladys Triveño
Minister of Health	Alberto Tejada Noriega
Minister of Energy and Mines	Jorge Merino Tafur
Minister of Education	Patricia Salas
Minister of the Interior	Wilber Calle
Minister of Justice	Juan Jiménez Mayor
Minister of Environment	Manuel Pulgar-Vidal
Minister of Culture	Luis Peirano
Minister of Development and Social Inclusion	Carolina Trivelli
