= Vicente Zeballos =

Peruvian politician

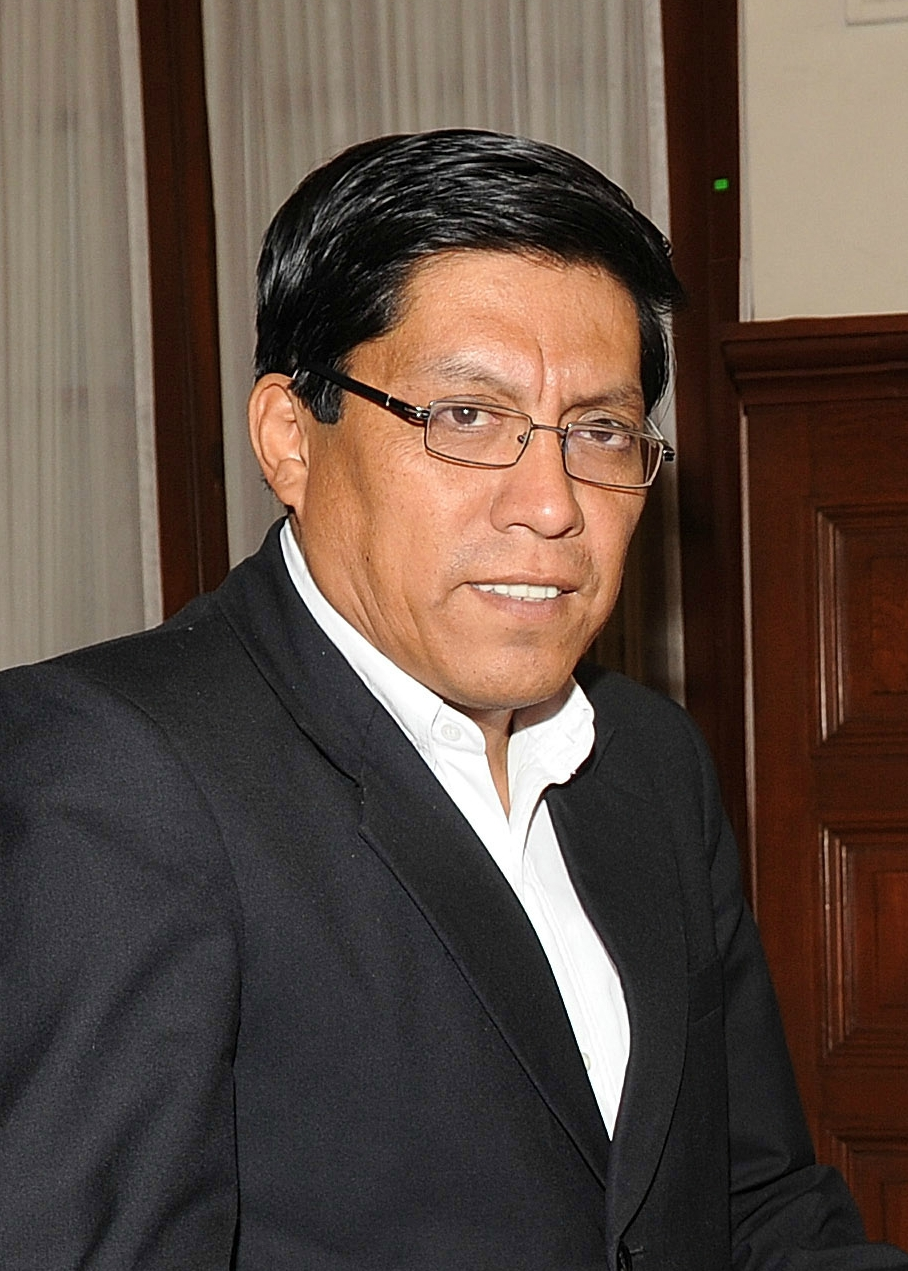

Permanent Representative of Peru to the Organization of American States
- In office 27 August 2020 – 10 November 2020
- President: Martín Vizcarra
- Preceded by: José Manuel Boza Orozco
- Succeeded by: Hugo de Zela

Prime Minister of Peru
- In office 30 September 2019 – 15 July 2020
- President: Martín Vizcarra
- Deputy: Desilú León Chempén
- Preceded by: Salvador del Solar
- Succeeded by: Pedro Cateriano

Minister of Justice and Human Rights
- In office 21 July 2018 – 30 September 2019
- President: Martín Vizcarra
- Preceded by: Salvador Heresi
- Succeeded by: Ana Teresa Revilla

Member of Congress
- In office 26 July 2011 – 30 September 2019
- Constituency: Moquegua

Mayor of Mariscal Nieto
- In office 1 January 2003 – 31 December 2006

Personal details
- Born: 10 May 1963 (age 63) Tacna, Peru
- Party: Independent (2015–present)
- Other political affiliations: Union for Peru (2001-2015); Peruvians for Change (non-affiliated member) (2016-2019)
- Education: Universidad Inca Garcilaso de la Vega (LLB); Complutense University of Madrid

Vicente Antonio Zeballos Salinas (born 10 May 1963) is a Peruvian politician who served as Prime Minister of Peru from September 2019 to July 2020, under President Martín Vizcarra's administration. Prior, he served as Minister of Justice and Human Rights.

Born in the southern region of Tacna, Zeballos began his political career as mayor of Mariscal Nieto Province in Moquegua, from 2003 to 2006. Subsequently, in 2011, he was elected to Congress in for the National Solidarity Alliance, representing Moquegua and the only congressman from Union for Peru. Zeballos was reelected in 2016, running this time as an independent within Peruvians for Change. He left the parliamentary caucus in December 2017, in protest to the pardon granted to former president Alberto Fujimori by the leader of the party and then-President of Peru, Pedro Pablo Kuczynski.

In Martín Vizcarra's administration, Zeballos was appointed Minister of Justice and Human Rights, serving in the position until his appointment as Prime Minister after Salvador del Solar's resignation due to the denied confidence given by Congress, prompting its constitutional dissolution. His tenure was marked by controversy and subject of extensive media scrutiny regarding his management skills, specifically during the COVID-19 pandemic in Peru. Zeballos was succeeded in office by former Prime Minister Pedro Cateriano on July 15, 2020.

== Early life and education ==
Vicente Antonio Zeballos Salinas was born on May 10, 1963, in Tacna, Peru, but was raised in the city of Moquegua. He completed his high school education at the Simón Bolivar School of Moquegua.

He enrolled in the Inca Garcilaso de la Vega University, where he studied law and political science, attaining a law degree. He specialized in constitutional law at the Center for Constitutional Studies in Madrid, Spain. He pursued a PhD in constitutional law at the Complutense University of Madrid, but did not complete the degree.

He has dedicated himself to university teaching at the Private University of Tacna.

== Political career ==
=== Early political career ===
Zeballos started his political career by running for a seat in the Peruvian Congress in the 2001 elections with the Union for Peru party representing the Moquegua constituency. Although not elected, he gained prominence in his region, gaining the mayorship of the Mariscal Nieto Province in 2002. He ran for reelection in 2006 and 2010, but was not re-elected.

=== Peruvian Congress (2011-2019) ===
In late 2010, former mayor Luis Castañeda of Lima started his full-scale presidential campaign for the 2011 elections. Recruiting regional leaders around the country, Zeballos was selected to run for Congress in the National Solidarity Alliance, which grouped Union for Peru in coalition with the National Solidarity Party, Always Together and Cambio 90. The alliance would attain 9 seats in Congress, with Zeballos elected representing Moquegua for the 2011–2016 term, and as the only Congressman from the Union for Peru. As a legislator, he was part of the Education, Youth and Sports Commissions; Constitution and Regulations; Decentralization and Foreign Relations. Likewise, he was president of the Audit Commission from 2013 to 2014 and of the Investigative Commission of the Rodolfo Orellana Rengifo Case.

In his term in office, he was considered a swing vote among regional representatives. He ran for the Presidency of the Congress in 2015, losing to opposition congressman Luis Iberico Núñez.

In the 2016 elections, he was invited to run for reelection under the Peruvians for Change congressional list of the Moquegua Region. He was successfully reelected for the 2016–2021 term. Serving in the cabinet as Minister of Justice and Human Rights, his term would be shortened due to the dissolution of Congress issued by president Vizcarra on September 30, 2019. On June 21, 2017, he was appointed spokesman for his bench for the period 2017–2018; however, on December 27 of the same year, he resigned from the ruling party in protest at the humanitarian pardon granted to former President Alberto Fujimori by President Pedro Pablo Kuczynski.

=== Minister of Justice and Human Rights (2018-2019) ===
On July 21, 2018, president Martín Vizcarra appointed him Minister of Justice, replacing the disgraced Salvador Heresi, who resigned amidst the political scandal involving the Supreme Court Justice, César Hinostroza.

During his tenure, he was questioned before Congress twice. On March 14, 2019, with 8 votes in favor, 24 against, and one abstention, Congress approved the admission of a motion for appeal against Zeballos for him to report on the terms of the collaboration agreement with the Brazilian company Odebrecht, which was signed with the Public Ministry and the Attorney General. On August 15, 2019, Congress voted on the admission of a second motion for appeal against the minister to respond to the escape of the hitman William Moreno (a.k.a. "Goro"), hitman from former Governor of Ancash, César Álvarez's criminal network, and implicated in the death of former regional councilman, Ezequiel Nolasco and Hilda Saldarriaga. With 63 votes in favor, eight against and 21 abstentions, Zeballos was summoned on September 2 to answer a set of 12 questions regarding the case.

On September 2, 2019, Zeballos attended Congress to answer the questions of the interpellation statement. The debate lasted more than four hours and was finally suspended by the President of Congress, Pedro Olaechea, without actually presenting a vote of no confidence.

On September 23, a few days before the election of the magistrates of the Constitutional Court, which was scheduled to take place on the 30th of that month, Zeballos indicated that it should be suspended after the broadcast of an audio in which parliamentarians Popular Force and APRA talked about the issue.

The minister denied having lied to the Justice Committee about the hitman's escape, and denied alleged rumors of wanting to divert attention from the criminal's escape. To his presentation, Zeballos also added the existence of responsibilities of both the National Penitentiary Institute (INPE) and the Judiciary.

=== Premiership (2019-2020) ===
On September 30, 2019, Zeballos was sworn as the new Prime Minister of Peru, succeeding Salvador del Solar, following the disputed attempt by Congress passing a no-confidence motion against the latter and his cabinet as a whole. The decree dissolving Congress was the first law signed by president Vizcarra and Zeballos as prime minister.

On October 30, 2019, Zeballos presented, together with president Vizcarra, the main policies that his administration would advance in the following months: universal access to health services, an increase in the national minimum wage, fighting against violence against women, promoting public safety and education, and constructing two large airports. Prior to this, the government had declared that after the dissolution of Congress it would not be appropriate to present the measures of the ministerial cabinet before the Congressional Permanent Assembly, which had limited functions.

On March 6, 2020, after the announcement by President Martín Vizcarra in which he confirmed the first case of COVID-19 infection in Peru, the Prime Minister initially indicated that the prevention and treatment protocols were active together with the joint and coordination of all health sectors, such as EsSalud, police hospitals, military hospitals and private entities.

On May 19, 2020, the President of the Congress, Manuel Merino, invited Zeballos to a face-to-face session of Congress in compliance with Articles 130 and 135 of the Constitution and Article 82 of the Rules of Congress. The first article establishes that within 30 days of taking office, the Cabinet must attend Congress, expose the government's general policy and the main measures that its management requires. Article 135 establishes that after the parliamentary interregnum, the Prime Minister must expose the acts of the Executive Branch during the period between the dissolution and the installation of the new Congress.

Zeballos told the press that it is not appropriate to quote him based on article 130, as this cabinet "pre-exists" the new Congress. He indicated that he should only be called in application of 135 and criticized that a face-to-face session be held amid isolation from the COVID-19 pandemic in Peru. Hours later, the President of Congress pointed out that the Zeballos cabinet does not have the confidence of the previous Congress or the current one. Then, the Chairman of the Constitutional Committee of Congress, Omar Chehade, warned that if the Prime Minister does not request confidence, he would commit to contempt, and it would be possible for a constitutional accusation and censorship.

On May 28, 2020, Zeballos went to request the vote of confidence with his cabinet. He obtained 89 votes in favor, 35 against, and 4 abstentions.

On July 1, the Union for Peru bench presented a motion to interpellate Zeballos and the Minister of Justice, Fernando Castañeda, stating that urgent responses were required to the problems of public health, economic reactivation and corruption.45 As In response, the prime minister argued that although he respected the autonomy of Congress and both he and his ministers would continue to attend the summons issued by the different commissions, he considered that these motions (six in total, together with those previously presented against the heads of Economy, Health, Education and Development and Social Inclusion) did not add efforts to the fight against the coronavirus pandemic; but on the contrary, they sought to hinder the work of the Executive or to gain prominence.

==== Resignation ====
Facing criticism regarding his tenure during the COVID-19 pandemic in Peru, Zeballos resigned on July 15, 2020. On the same day, Vizcarra appointed Pedro Cateriano as Zeballos' successor, marking the end of a 10-month tenure in cabinet leadership.

== OAS Representative ==
In 2020, he was appointed Permanent Representative of Peru to the Organization of American States.

The appointment was questioned in a public statement by former ministers Luis Solari de la Fuente, Jorge del Castillo Gálvez, Ántero Flores-Aráoz, Ismael Benavides Ferreyros, Hernán Garrido Lecca, Luis Gonzales Posada, Rafael Rey, Aurelio Pastor Valdivieso; the former presidents of the Constitutional Court, Víctor García Toma, Oscar Urviola Hani; former parliamentarians Lourdes Flores Nano, Luis Galarreta Velarde, Rolando Sousa Huanambal, Lourdes Alcorta, Fabiola Morales Castillo, Martín Belaúnde Moreyra, Raúl Castro Stagnaro, Lourdes Mendoza del Solar, Rafael Yamashiro Oré and the ambassadors Eduardo Ponce Vivanco, Alfonso Rivero Monsalve, José Luis Pérez Sánchez-Cerro; among others. The signatories considered Zeballos' appointment as "inconvenient" due to the results of his management in the face of the COVID-19 pandemic and his participation in the dissolution of Congress, which they described as "unconstitutional."

In Congress, an interpellation was announced to the Minister of Foreign Affairs, Mario López Chávarri, for the appointment of Zeballos.

== Controversies ==
On October 21, 2019, Zeballos referred to the possible candidacies of legislators from the recently dissolved congress, questioning whether they should be able to participate in the 2020 congressional elections, referring to the constitutional referendum of 2018 where the immediate re-election of parliamentarians had been specifically addressed.

On November 14, 2019, Luis Carrasco, the president of the Special Electoral Jury for Lima Centro (Jurado Electoral Especial; JEE), opened an investigation into the prime minister for allegedly violating, through his statement to the press as a public official, the principle of electoral neutrality. In response, Zeballos questioned the legal basis for the JEE investigation.

On November 27, 2019, JEE closed their investigation of Zeballos. However, the body did move to censure Minister of Women and Vulnerable Populations, Gloria Montenegro, accusing her of the same infraction, although the motion did not prosper.
