= Ana Jara =

Peruvian lawyer and politician

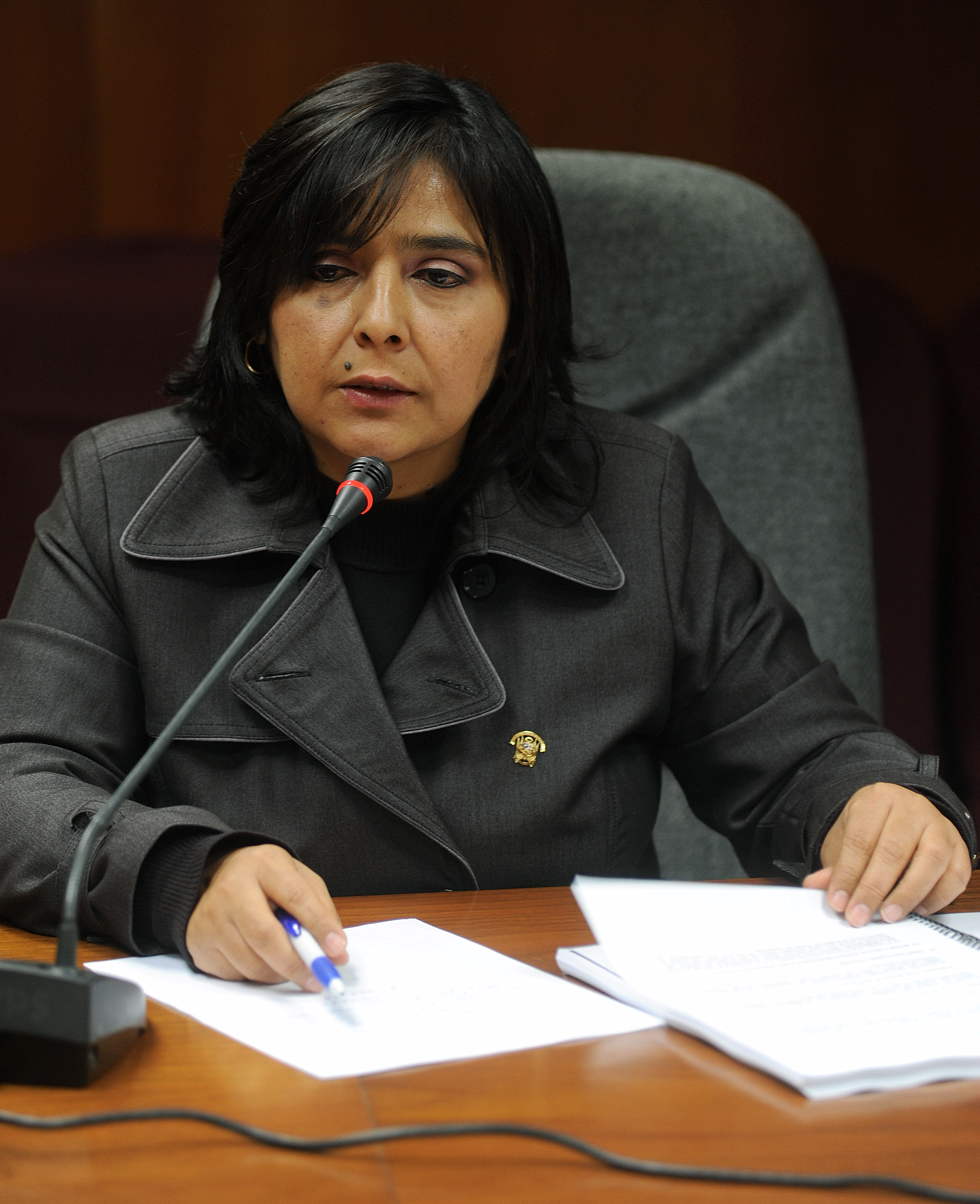

Prime Minister of Peru
- In office 22 July 2014 – 2 April 2015
- President: Ollanta Humala
- Preceded by: René Cornejo
- Succeeded by: Pedro Cateriano

Minister of Labour and Promotion of Employment
- In office 24 February 2014 – 22 July 2014
- President: Ollanta Humala
- Prime Minister: René Cornejo
- Preceded by: Nancy Laos Cáceres
- Succeeded by: Fredy Otárola

Minister of Women and Vulnerable Populations
- In office 11 December 2011 – 24 February 2014
- President: Ollanta Humala
- Prime Minister: Salomon Lerner; Oscar Valdés; Juan Jiménez; César Villanueva
- Preceded by: Aída García Naranjo
- Succeeded by: Carmen Omonte

Member of Congress
- In office 26 July 2011 – 26 July 2016
- Constituency: Ica

Personal details
- Born: 11 May 1968 (age 58) Ica, Peru
- Party: Nationalist Party
- Other political affiliations: Peru Wins (2010–present)
- Education: St Aloysius Gonzaga National; University

Ethel Ana del Rosario Jara Velásquez (born 11 May 1968) is a Peruvian lawyer and politician who was Prime Minister of Peru from July 2014 to April 2015.

== Early life ==
Ana Jara was born in Ica on May 11, 1968. She attended elementary school at I.E. No. 22494 Juan XXIII and high school in Antonia Moreno de Cáceres School located in the same city.

She studied Law and Political Science at the Saint Aloysius Gonzaga National University in Ica. Likewise, the Master of Law studies, with a mention in Civil and Commercial Law, culminated in the Graduate School of the same university. She has a PhD in Law.

In 1998, she began to practice as a notary public in Ica. She was secretary of the Mutual Fund of Peruvian Notaries (2000–2001), member of the Advisory Council of the Zone XI Registry Office (2002–2003) and Vice Dean of the College of Notaries of Ica (2005–2006).

== Political career ==
In 2006, she ran unsuccessfully for Congresswoman for Ica under Union for Peru and a few months later, Jara ran for Governor of Ica, placing third. Five years later, Ana Jara was elected congresswoman, representing the Nationalist-dominated Peru Wins. She was member of the board of directors and of the Permanent Commission of the Congress of the Republic, of the Audit and Justice Commissions and secretary of the Housing Commission. Likewise, she served as president of the Foreign Relations Commission.

On 11 December 2011, upon assuming the second ministerial cabinet of President Ollanta Humala chaired by Óscar Valdés, she was sworn in as Minister of Women and Social Development until 2014. On 21 January 2012, her office was renamed the Ministry of Women and Vulnerable Populations.

On 24 February 2014, she became Minister of Labour and Employment Promotion of Peru in a renewed cabinet whose presidency was assumed by René Cornejo.

After the resignation of René Cornejo, Ana Jara became president of the Council of Ministers. Her swearing-in ceremony was held on 22 July 2014, in the Golden Room of the Government Palace.

On 26 August, after two unsuccessful attempts, Jara and her ministerial cabinet obtained the vote of confidence from the Congress of the Republic.

On 20 March 2015, the opposition in Congress presented a motion of censure against the prime minister due to the intelligence service spying on politicians, business leaders, and journalists. This motion was debated on the 30th of the same month, being censored by Congress with 72 votes in favor and 42 against, and due to this she had to resign from office.

== See also ==
- President of the Council of Ministers of Peru
- Ollanta Humala
- Peruvian Nationalist Party

Political offices
Preceded by René Cornejo	Prime Minister of Peru; 2014–2015	Succeeded by Pedro Cateriano
