= Patricia Salas O'Brien =

Peruvian sociologist

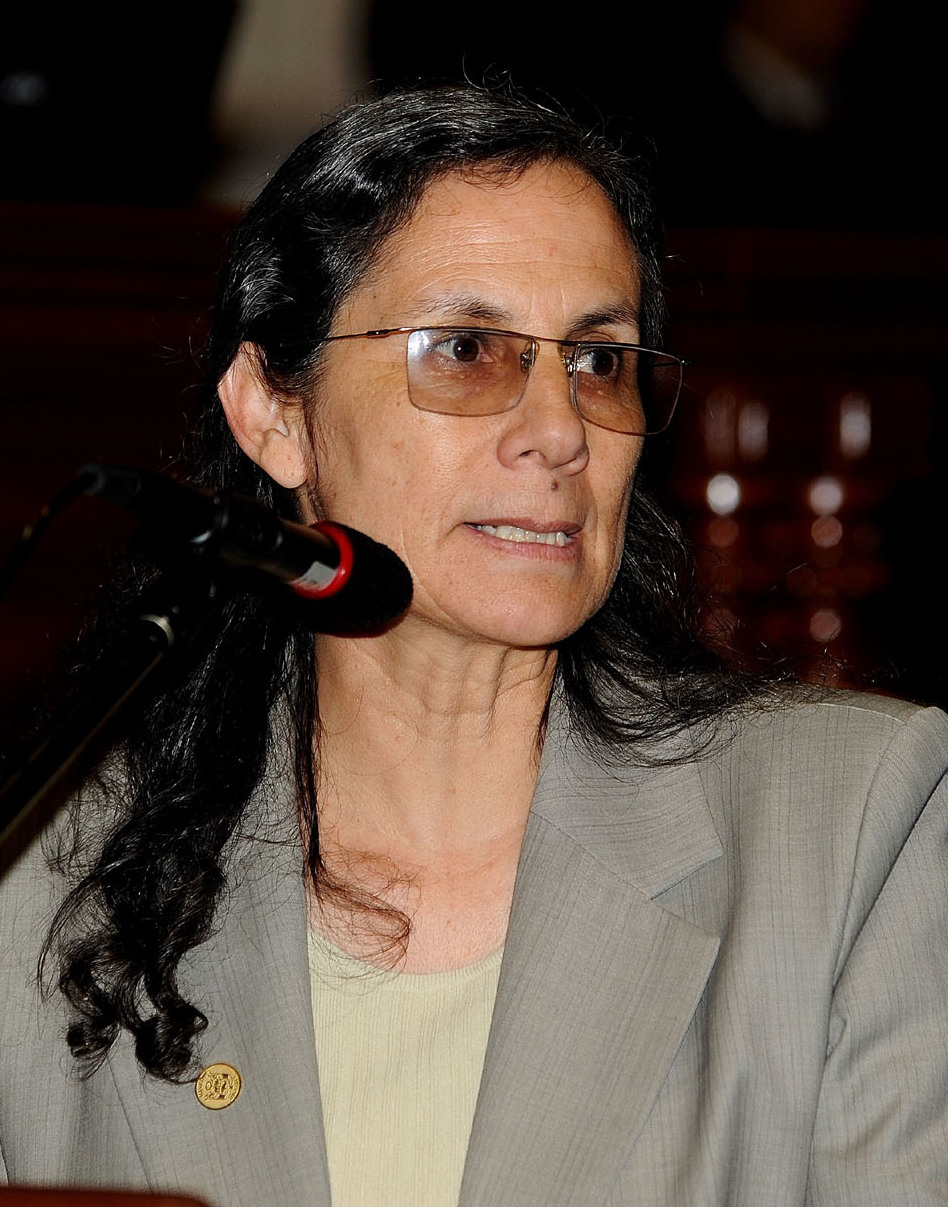

Minister of Education of Peru
- In office 28 July 2011 – 31 October 2013
- President: Ollanta Humala

Personal details
- Born: Emma Patricia Salas O'Brien; December 6, 1958 (age 67) Arequipa, Peru
- Education: National University of Saint Augustine; Catholic University of Santa María
- Occupation: Sociologist

Patricia Salas O'Brien (also known as, Patricia Salas; Arequipa, December 6, 1958) is a Peruvian sociologist with expertise in education and social development. She served as Minister of Education of Peru from July 28, 2011, to October 31, 2013.

== Biography ==
Emma Patricia Salas O'Brien holds a degree in sociology from the National University of Saint Augustine (UNSA), with a master's degree in Development Strategies and Social Policies from the same university. She also completed a Ph.D. in Social Sciences at the Catholic University of Santa María (UCSM) in Arequipa.

She has been a senior lecturer at the Faculty of Social History and Sociology at UCSM (1989–2010), as well as a senior lecturer and researcher at the Institute for Educational Research and Policy at the Antonio Ruiz de Montoya University (UARM) (2010–2011). She was president of the Consejo Nacional de Educación (Perú) (National Education Council) (CNE), from 2005 to 2008, and participated in the design of the current National Education Project. She was an associate of the Centro de Investigación, Educación y Desarrollo (Center for Research, Education and Development) (CIED), as well as a founding member of the Grupo Impulsor Inversión en la Infancia.She is an associate of the Colectivo Laboratorio de Politica y Cultura.

On July 28, 2011, she was sworn in as Minister of Education, as a member of President Ollanta Humala's first cabinet. The ceremony was held in the Golden Hall of the Government Palace.
