= Silvia Loli =

Peruvian politician

Minister of Women and Vulnerable Populations
- In office 18 November 2020 – 28 July 2021
- President: Francisco Sagasti
- Prime Minister: Violeta Bermúdez
- Preceded by: Patricia Teullet
- Succeeded by: Anahí Durand

Silvia Rosario Loli Espinoza is a Peruvian politician. From 18 November 2020 to 28 July 2021, she served as the Minister of Women and Vulnerable Populations in the presidency of Francisco Sagasti.

== Biography ==
In 2017, Loli was appointed Vice Minister of Women by President Pedro Pablo Kuczynski. She held the position until 2019.

Loli was director of the General Directorate against Gender Violence, she has also been head of the Women's Management of the Metropolitan Municipality of Lima. She has also been a consultant for the Peruvian Institute for Responsible Parenthood and taught at the Latin American Center for Social Work (Celats).
