= Anahí Durand =

Peruvian sociologist (born 1978)

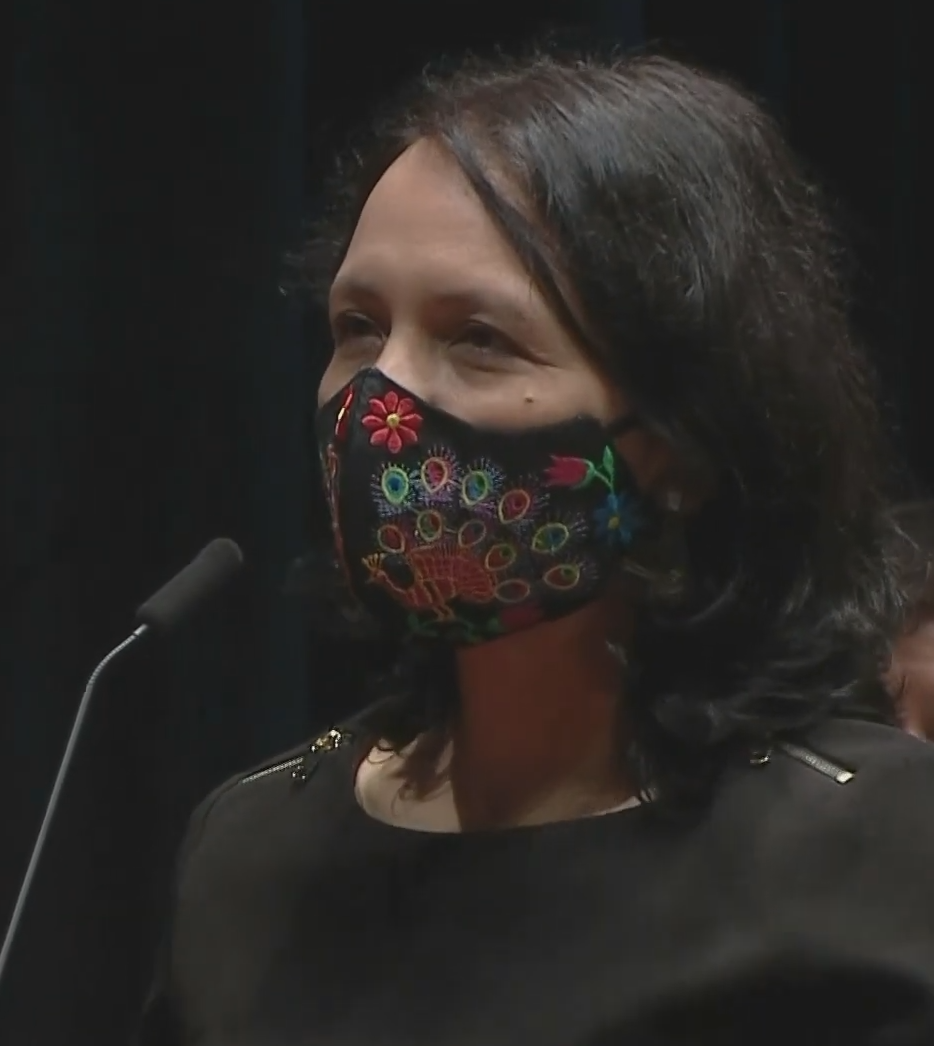

Minister of Women and Vulnerable Populations
- In office 29 July 2021 – 8 February 2022
- President: Pedro Castillo
- Prime Minister: Guido Bellido; Mirtha Vásquez; Héctor Valer
- Preceded by: Silvia Loli
- Succeeded by: Diana Miloslavich

Personal details
- Born: 1 April 1978 (age 48) Lima, Peru
- Party: New Peru
- Education: National University of San Marcos; Latin American Faculty of Social Sciences; National Autonomous University of Mexico

Anahí Durand Guevara (born 1 April 1978) is a Peruvian sociologist. From July 2021 to February 2022, she served as the Minister of Women and Vulnerable Populations in the presidency of Pedro Castillo.

== Biography ==
Durand is the daughter of the sociologist Julio Durand Lazo. She has a degree in sociology from the National University of San Marcos (UNMSM) and a master's degree in social sciences from the Latin American Faculty of Social Sciences. She has a doctorate in sociology from the National Autonomous University of Mexico. Durand is a professor at the Faculty of Social Sciences of the UNMSM. She is a specialist in social movements, political representation, indigenous peoples, interculturality and gender.

== Political career ==
Durand is a member of the New Peru political party and was head of the government plan of presidential candidate Verónika Mendoza for the 2021 general election. In said election, she ran for Andean Parliament for Together for Peru without success. After the alliance for the second round between New Peru and Free Peru, the party of candidate Pedro Castillo, she became part of the technical team that drew up the government plan for the first 100 days.

=== Minister for Women and Vulnerable Populations ===
On 29 July 2021, Durand was appointed Minister of Women and Vulnerable Populations of Peru in the government of Pedro Castillo.
