= Salvador del Solar =

Peruvian actor, director and politician

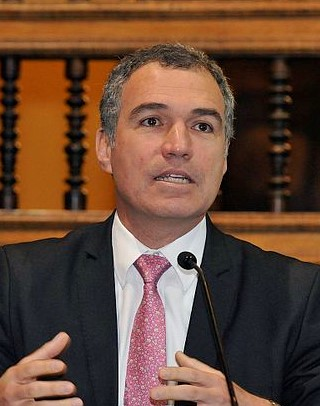
- Del Solar in 2017 as Minister of Culture

Prime Minister of Peru
- In office 11 March 2019 – 30 September 2019
- President: Martín Vizcarra
- Deputy: Jorge Arrunátegui; Desilú León Chempén
- Preceded by: César Villanueva
- Succeeded by: Vicente Zeballos

6th Minister of Culture
- In office 5 December 2016 – 9 January 2018
- Prime Minister: Fernando Zavala; Mercedes Aráoz
- Preceded by: Jorge Nieto Montesinos
- Succeeded by: Alejandro Neyra Sánchez

Personal details
- Born: 1 May 1970 (age 56) Lima, Peru
- Party: Independent
- Spouse: Ximena Bellido Denegri
- Children: 1
- Education: Pontificia Universidad Católica del Perú (LLB); Syracuse University (MA)

Salvador Alejandro Jorge del Solar Labarthe (Spanish pronunciation: [salβaˈðoɾ ðel soˈlaɾ]; born 1 May 1970) is a Peruvian actor, film director and politician. He served as Prime Minister of Peru from March to September 2019, in President Martín Vizcarra's administration.

Born in Lima, from a very young age he showed passion for acting. At first, he pursued a career in law, graduating from the Pontifical Catholic University of Peru in 1994. After working one-year as a lawyer, he decided to pursue a career in acting. Enrolled in Alberto Ísola's workshop, he starred in a variety of national classical theatre productions. Subsequently, he starred in three television series' directed by Luis Llosa. He gained international fame in 2000 for his portrayal of "Captain Pantaleón Pantoja" in Captain Pantoja and the Special Services film adaptation of Mario Vargas Llosa's classical novel, directed by Francisco J. Lombardi. The film was selected as Peru's 72nd Academy Awards Best Foreign Language Film Award submission, but was not nominated. Del Solar took a brief hiatus of acting as he travelled to New York to pursue a master's degree in international relations at Syracuse University. Upon finishing his graduate studies, he acted in a variety of television productions, and ultimately relocated to Colombia and Mexico. He also starred in The Vanished Elephant in 2013. In 2014, he debuted as film director with Magallanes. In 2024, he released his second feature Ramón and Ramón at the 72nd San Sebastian International Film Festival.

After years dedicated to cultural promotion in his country, President Pedro Pablo Kuczynski appointed him Minister of Culture in a cabinet reshuffle on 5 December 2016, switching the previous Minister of Culture to Defense. In his one-year tenure as minister, he took a prominent role in promoting Peruvian cinema, and relaunching renowned museums throughout the country. He tendered his resignation on 27 December 2017, alongside other cabinet ministers in protest of president Kuczynski's pardon of former President Alberto Fujimori, imprisoned for murder and aggravated kidnapping.

Upon César Villanueva's resignation as Prime Minister of Peru, Del Solar was appointed by president Martín Vizcarra as Villanueva's successor, on 11 March 2019. As tension arose between the executive branch and the Fujimorist dominated Peruvian Congress in the months of his premiership, Del Solar and Vizcarra worked towards finding a solution to the ongoing political crisis. The situation escalated when Congress convened a new election of the Constitutional Court magistrates, prompting Del Solar to appear before Congress asking for a vote of confidence to modify the magistrate's election rules for institutional preservation. The majority of Congress ignored his presentation, and proceeded to elect the new magistrates. President Vizcarra interpreted the election as factual denial of confidence, ultimately dissolving Congress by constitutional decree on 30 September 2019. Due to the denial of confidence against the cabinet, Del Solar tendered his resignation on the same day. He was succeeded by Vicente Zeballos.

Del Solar is the first Peruvian politician to be heavily involved in the film industry and acting as a career. He is also the youngest prime minister of Peru, and the first one to be born after the multiple coups in Peru in the mid-20th century. He is viewed by pundits as potential presidential hopeful for the next general election cycles due to his positive experience as Prime Minister during the escalation of the 2017–2021 Peruvian political crisis but on 31 July 2020, he announced that he will not run for President.

== Early life and education ==
Salvador del Solar was born on 1 May 1970, in Lima. He is the son of Salvador del Solar Figuerola and Elvira Labarthe Flores. His great-great-grandfather, Pedro Alejandrino del Solar was President of the Council of Ministers and Vice President of Peru.

He attended the Santa María Marianistas School of Lima. After the completion of his high school studies, he was admitted to the Pontifical Catholic University of Peru, where he graduated as a lawyer with honors. During his undergraduate studies in law, he founded and directed the law magazine Lus et Veritas, and served as head of internships at several chairs. Subsequently, he completed a master's degree in International Relations at the Maxwell School of Citizenship and Public Affairs at Syracuse University with a specialization in Communication and Intercultural Negotiation (2002).

He was selected national of the water polo team.

== Acting career ==
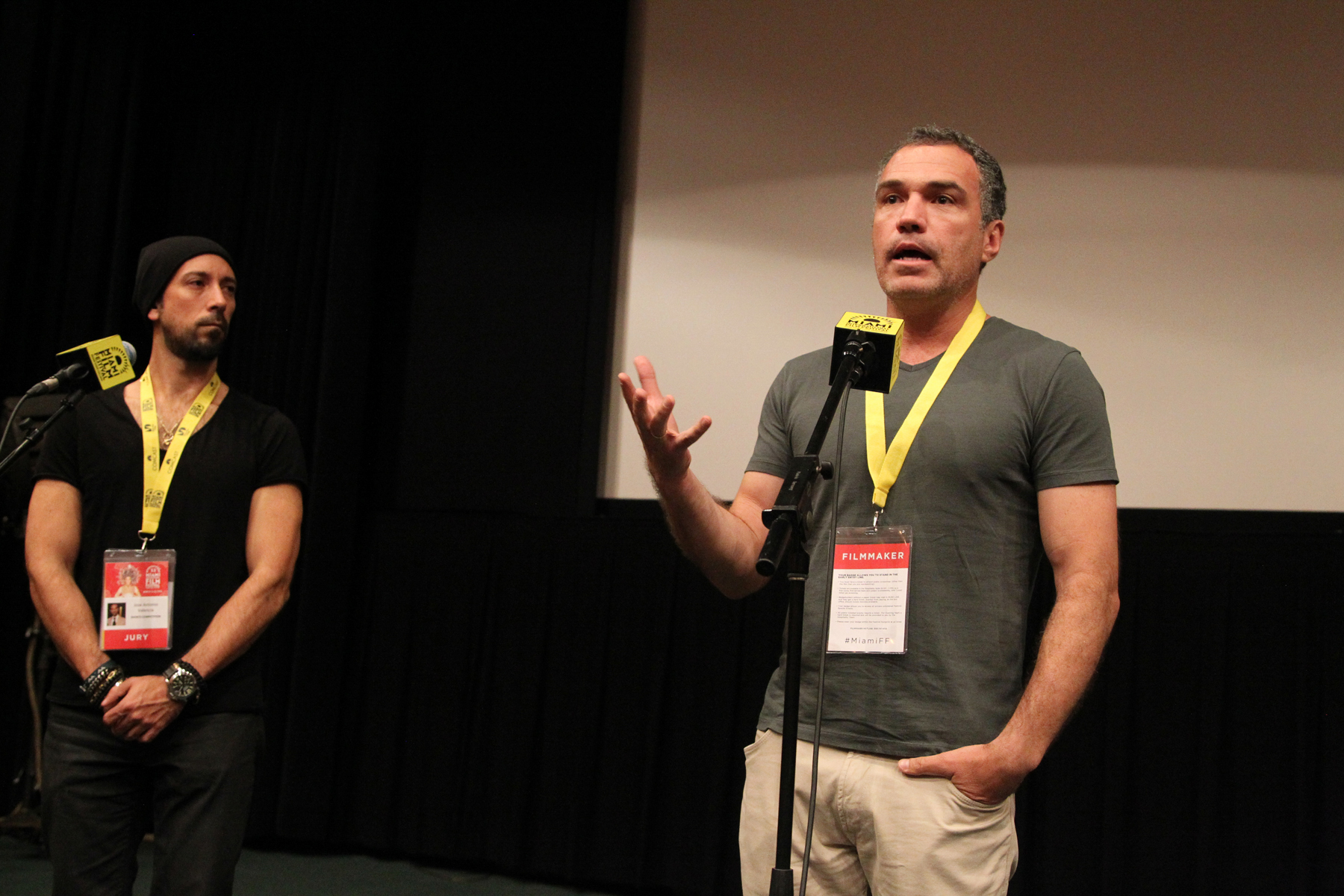
Salvador del Solar at the Miami Film Festival presentation of his film Magallanes.

Upon graduating from the Pontifical Catholic University of Peru as a lawyer, he worked at many law firms in Lima. After a year in his last law firm, he quit to pursue a career in acting. Subsequently, he enrolled in Alberto Isola's professional actors workshop, later starting a career in the theater, which has included works such as Presas de Salón, Ojos Bonitos, Ugly Paintings, Hamlet, El Gran Teatro del Mundo and King Lear, after which he traveled to Colombia to continue his career.

In 1999, with Angie Cepeda, he starred in the film Captain Pantoja and the Special Services, directed by Francisco J. Lombardi, based on the homonymous novel by Mario Vargas Llosa; the film was a success between the public and the critics. The same year, he starred in the telenovela Pobre Diabla, again together with Angie Cepeda. The telenovela was a true success of the Peruvian productions, which led to its export to American and European countries.

In 2009, he returned to Peru to participate in the series The Dwarf. Salvador returned to Peru in 2012 to be a jury member of the 16th Lima Film Festival. He also recorded for the series El Capo 2, playing the lawyer Rubén Castro. In 2013, Del Solar participated in the movie The Missing Elephant by Javier Fuentes León, where he shared credits with Colombian actors Angie Cepeda and Andrés Parra. The film was released the following year. In 2014, Del Solar debuted as a film director with the film Magallanes.

== Political career ==
=== Minister of Culture (2016–2017) ===
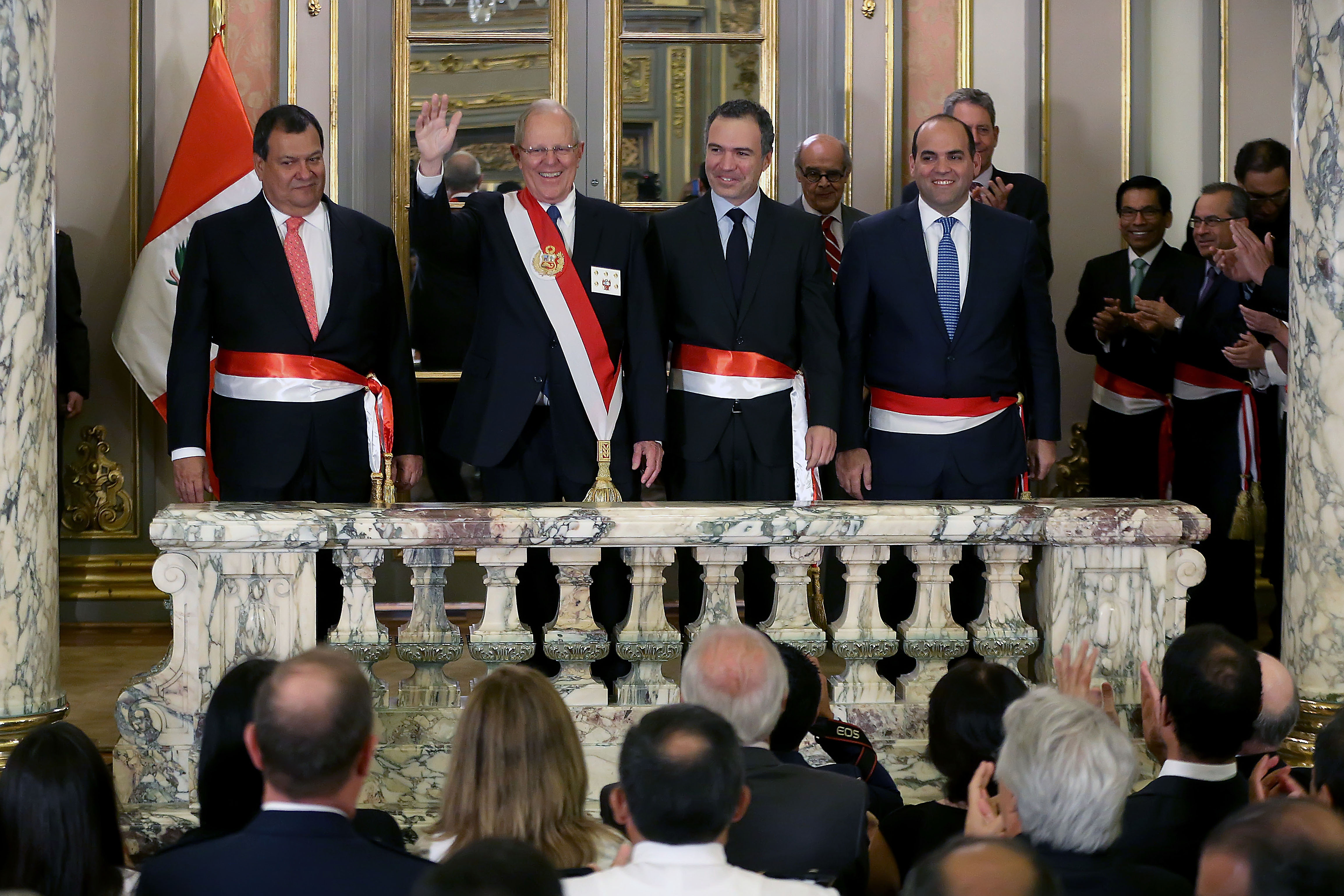
From left to right. The new Defense minister Jorge Nieto, President Pedro Pablo Kuczynski, Salvador del Solar, and Prime Minister Fernando Zavala at the ceremonial oath on 5 December 2016.

Del Solar was appointed Minister of Culture by president Pedro Pablo Kuczynski in a cabinet reshuffle, as the previous holder was switched to the Ministry of Defense, on 5 December 2016. Del Solar's appointment was viewed by pundits as a populist move by Kuczynski, amid the starting confrontation between the executive branch and the opposition-dominated Peruvian Congress led by Popular Force.

During his tenure as minister, Del Solar promoted the ministerial initiative for the new Cinema Law, which sought to increase the subsidy to Peruvian cinematographic works, including up to 30% of the project's investment. Del Solar also participated in a project for the relaunching of the Museum of the Nation, and the construction of the National Museum of Lurín.

Amidst the political turmoil regarding Alberto Fujimori's pardon granted by president Kuczynski's on 24 December 2017, Del Solar tendered his resignation as Minister of Culture on 27 December, alongside other cabinet ministers. His resignation was accepted on 9 January 2018, as Kuczynski appointed the former director of the National Library of Peru, Alejandro Neyra, as Del Solar's successor.

=== Premiership (2019) ===
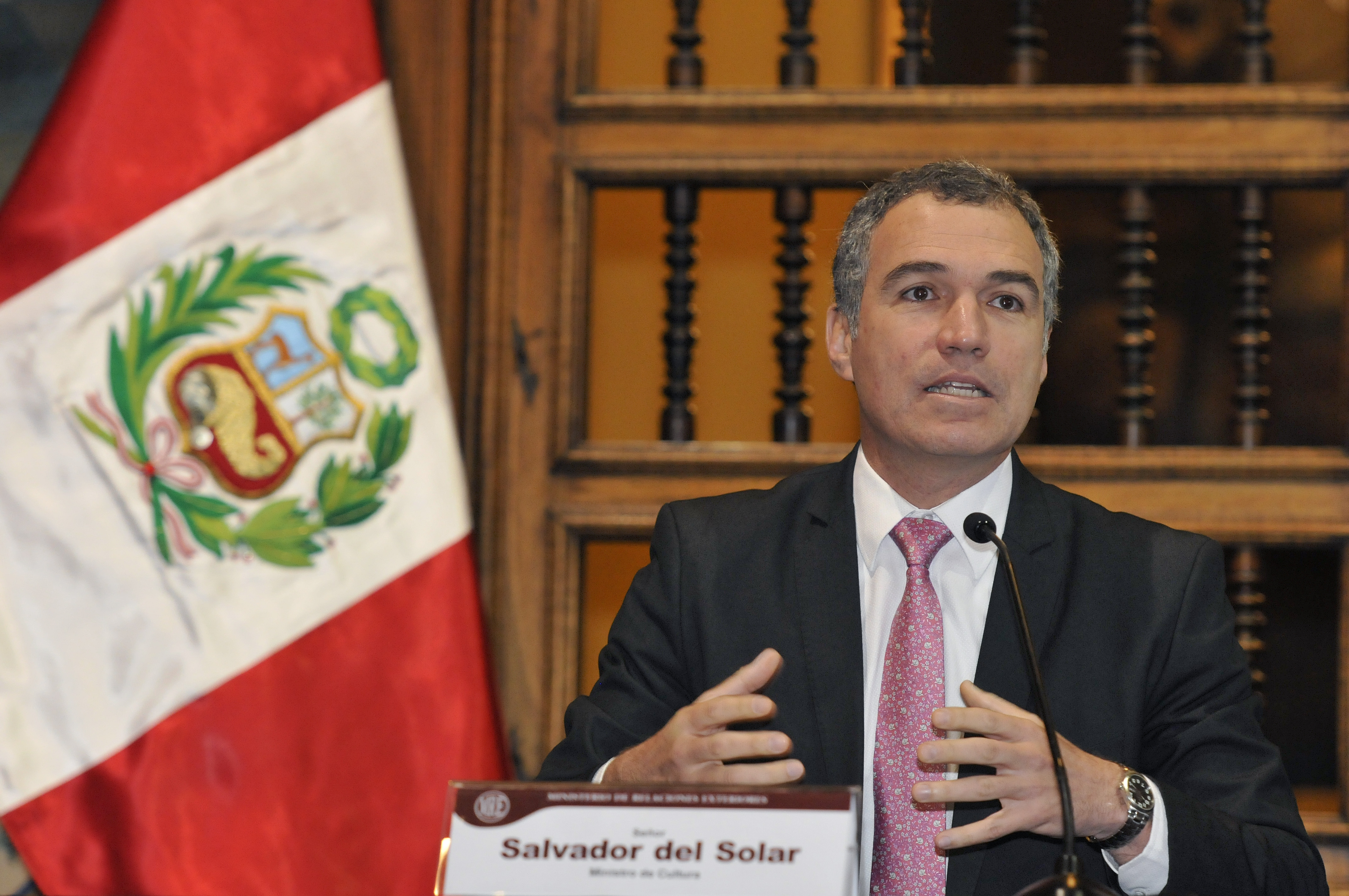
Del Solar at the Chancellorship headquarters after receiving from the Minister of Foreign Relations, Ricardo Luna, a batch of cultural assets, made up of more than 500 pieces belonging to the Cultural Heritage of the Nation, which were repatriated from Germany, Argentina, Bolivia, Spain, the United States, France, Italy and Mexico.

On 11 March 2019, Del Solar was appointed President of the Council of Ministers of Peru by president Martín Vizcarra, succeeding César Villanueva, who resigned three days before. Two weeks later, Del Solar met with President of Congress Daniel Salaverry, to announce his prompt visit to Congress and request the vote of confidence (known as investiture vote).

On 4 April, he appeared before Congress to expose, according to law, the general policy of the government and the measures that his management as head of the Cabinet would take. Del Solar began his exposition analyzing the national situation and the discontent of the population with political parties and institutions. Likewise, he presented on the main axes of the government: integrity and the fight against corruption, institutional strengthening, economic growth, social development and decentralization. With 46 votes in favor, 27 against and 21 abstentions, the vote of confidence was confirmed, this being in two decades the smallest share of votes obtained in favor of a new cabinet granted by Congress.

On 4 June, Del Solar raised a second vote of confidence in Congress for it to discuss six bills regarding the Political Reform proposed by Martín Vizcarra's administration. Congress approved the vote of confidence with 77 votes in favor, 44 against and 3 abstentions after a heated debate between the fujimorist opposition and pro-government caucuses.

==== Resignation and dissolution of Congress ====
On 30 September 2019, Del Solar appeared before Congress asking for a third vote of confidence to modify the process of selecting candidates for the Constitutional court, which had been criticized for its speed and lack of transparency. However, the opposition-dominated Congress chaired by Pedro Olaechea decided to continue with the selection process for magistrates, alleging that the selection was a constitutional prerogative exclusive to Congress, and not of the executive branch. The request for a vote of confidence was postponed until the afternoon of the same day. After 2 hours of debate, Gonzalo Ortiz de Zevallos (a cousin of Olaechea) was appointed to the Court, with 87 votes in favor.

President Martín Vizcarra interpreted that the vote of confidence was factually denied, so he proceeded with the acceptance of Del Solar's resignation and the subsequent dissolution of Congress, in accordance with the provisions granted in the Constitution. Simultaneously, Congress approved with 57 votes in favor, 31 against and 13 abstentions. This decision was considered unconstitutional, as Congress had been dissolved minutes before by constitutional decree.

Within a few hours, Vizcarra appointed then-minister of Justice and Human Rights, Vicente Zeballos, as the new President of the Council of Ministers, succeeding Del Solar, who finally signed the dissolution decree. Del Solar has since retired from politics.

=== Post-Premiership ===
Del Solar remains active in public opinion after his seven-month tenure as Prime Minister of Peru. At national level, he is perceived as potential presidential candidate for future general elections, due to his positive management in the government and popular appeal as an openly progressive politician. Pundits view his experience in fighting the opposition in order to appear before Congress to request the final vote of confidence as "his greatest asset" for a political future.

Although Del Solar's initially expressed interest in a possible presidential run, he has not commented on the matter regarding a full-scale campaign for 2021. Recent polls suggested he remained a strong contender among the new incoming political figures, alongside former footballer and mayor of La Victoria District, George Forsyth. Even former president Martín Vizcarra publicly declared Del Solar's possible candidacy as good alternative for the future of the country. Although, he ultimately declined to run in a televised interview on 31 July 2020, stating "I don't believe in individual efforts, but rather collective ones; I believe in institutional efforts, and I ratify my response not to be a candidate for the Presidency, and to invite those who can be or want to be to leave their individual thoughts, including supporters".

== Filmography ==
=== Directing ===
- Ramón and Ramón (2024)
- Magallanes (2014)

=== Acting ===
==== Movies ====
- Astronauta (2025) – Javier
- Women on the Edge (2023) – Edgardo Sánchez Leven
- How to Deal With a Heartbreak (2023)
- Doble (2017) – Federico
- El elefante desaparecido (2014) – Edo Celeste
- Saluda al diablo de mi parte (2012) – Moris
- Postales a Copacabana (2009) – Felipe
- El acuarelista (2008) – Ernesto
- Piratas en el Callao (2005)
- Muero por Muriel (2004)
- El atraco (2004)
- Bala perdida (2001)
- El bien esquivo (2001) – Carbajal
- Pantaleón y las visitadoras (1999) – Pantaleón Pantoja
- A la medianoche y media (1999)
- Coraje (1998)

==== Series ====
- One Hundred Years of Solitude (2024) - general Moncada
- El Regreso de Lucas (2016) – Reynaldo Díaz
- 2091 (2016) – Gorlero
- Narcos (2015) – Padre Sobrino
- Cumbia Ninja (2015) – Fiscal Diego Bravo
- Socias (2010)
- El enano (2009) – Vinnie Santamaría

==== Documentaries ====
- Sin retorno (2008)
- Tiempo final (2008) – Benítez
- Decisiones (2007)

==== Telenovelas ====
- La ley del corazón (2016)
- Amor de madre (2015) – Esteban Bermúdez (as guest star)
- Comando Elite (2013) – Colonel Ignacio Saravia (General Brigadier by the end of the series)
- El Capo 2 (2012) – Rubén Castro
- Correo de inocentes (2011) – Sergio Gaviria
- Amar y temer (2011) as Simón "El destructor" Oviedo
- La traición (2008) – Arturo de Linares
- Sin Vergüenza (2007) – Julián
- Amores de mercado (2006) – Eulalio Ocando
- Pobre diabla (2000) – Andrés Mejía-Guzmán
- Cosas del amor (1998) – Luis Salinas
- Apocalipsis (1997) – Esteban Quiroga/Talí
- Escándalo (1997) – Eduardo "Lalo" Dupont
- Lluvia de arena (1996)
- Malicia (1996) – Antonio
- Los Unos y los Otros (1995)

==== Theater ====
- El teniente de Inishmore (2010)
- Una pulga en la oreja (2009)
- El Hombre Almohada (2006) como Tupolski
- El mercader de Venecia (2005)
- Actos indecentes (2005)
- Enrique V (2005)
- El gran teatro del mundo (1999)
- El rey Lear (1999) como Edmud
- Cómo te da la gana (1998)
- Ojos bonitos, cuadros feos (1996)
- El dedo en el ojo (1996)
- Séptimo Cielo (1995)
- Hamlet (1995)
- Las leyes de la hospitalidad (1994)
- En algún lugar del corazón (1994)
- Presas del salón (1993)

== Awards ==
- Best Actor of the Year in Television for the role of "Lalo" Dupont in the telenovela Escándalo / Revista TV +, of the newspaper El Comercio / Perú / 1997.
- Best Telenovela Actor for his participation in the telenovela Pobre Diabla / América Televisión / Perú / 2001.
- Best Actor Award for his participation in the film Pantaleón and the Visitatrix, at the International Film Festivals of Cartagena de Indias, Colombia / 2000; of Troia, Portugal / 2000; de Gramado, Brazil / 2000; and of Santo Domingo, Dominican Republic / 2001.
- Bulgarian TeleNovelas magazine award for Best Antagonist Actor for his participation in the telenovela Amores de Mercado / Bulgaria, 2007.
