= Diana Miloslavich =

Peruvian politician

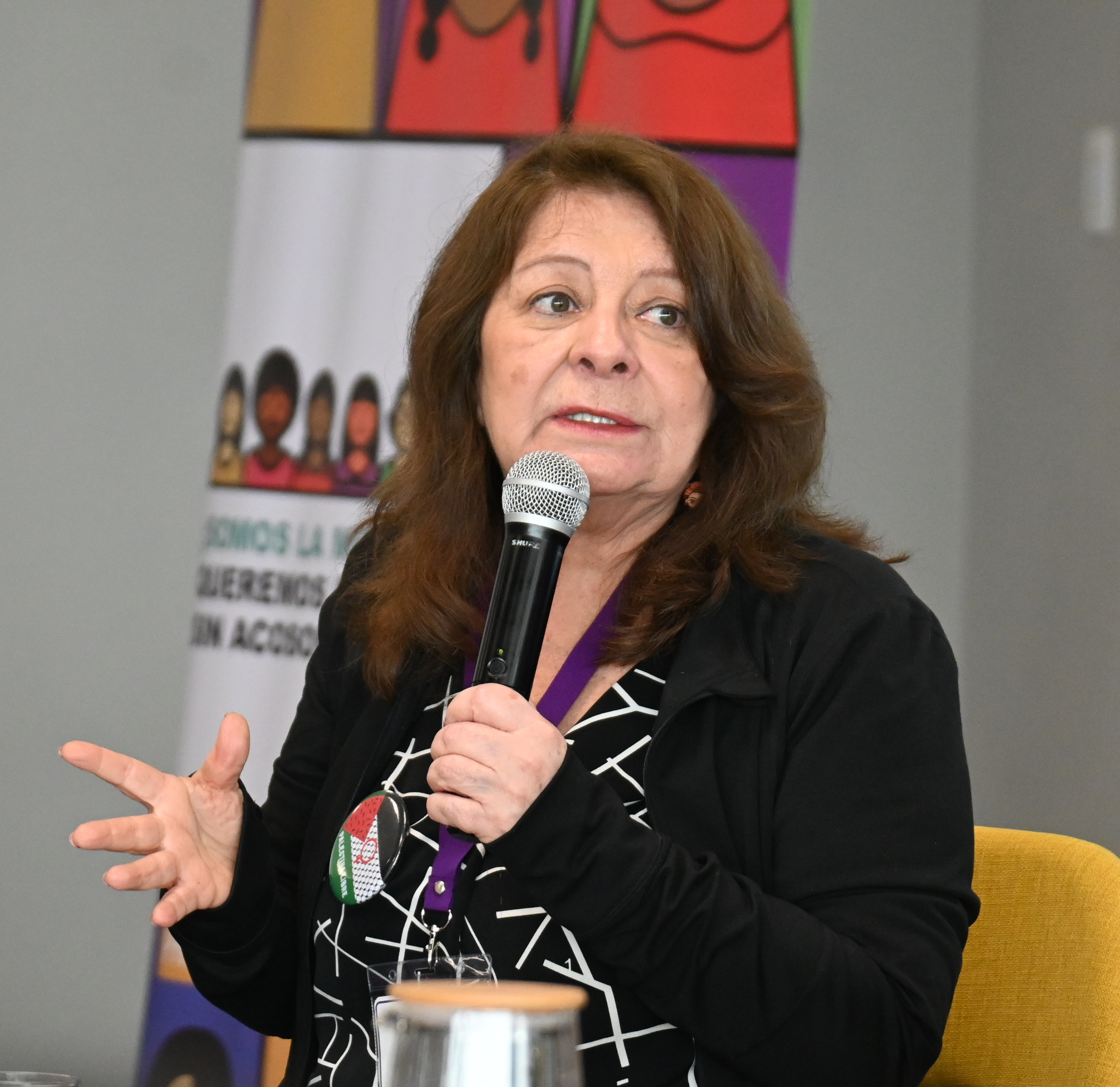
Diana Miloslavich in 2022

Diana Mirian Miloslavich Túpac is a Peruvian politician. She served as Minister of Women and Vulnerable Populations from February until August 2022. She was born in Huancayo.
