= Lourdes Alcorta =

Peruvian politician

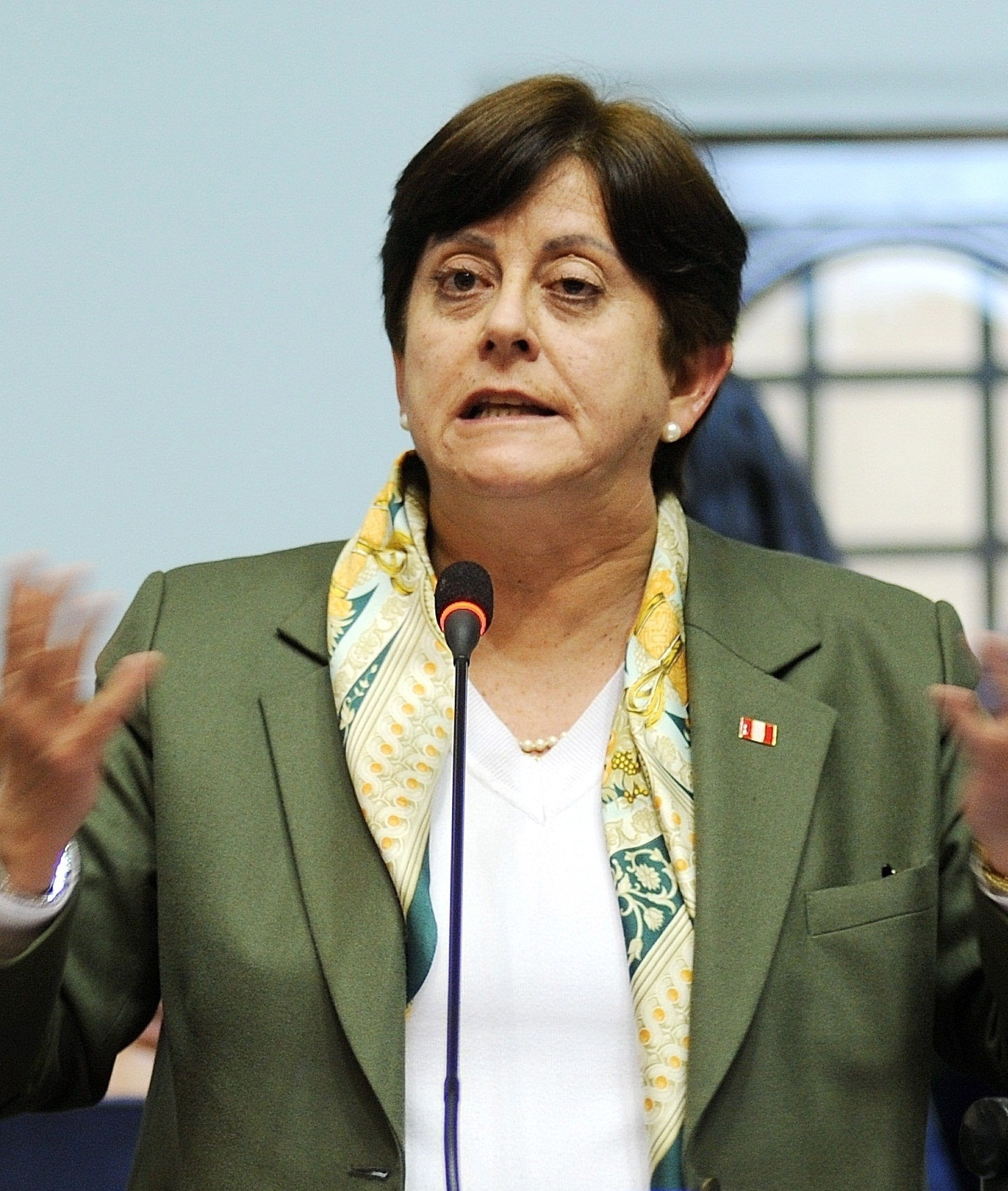
- Alcorta in 2010

Senator of the Republic
- Incumbent
- Assumed office 26 July 2026
- Constituency: Nationwide

Member of Congress
- In office 27 July 2006 – 16 March 2020
- Constituency: Lima province

Member of the San Isidro City Council
- In office 1 January 2003 – 26 July 2006

Personal details
- Born: María Lourdes Pía Luisa Alcorta Suero; 21 June 1951 (age 75) Miraflores District, Lima, Peru
- Party: RP (since 2024)
- Other political affiliations: PPC (2002–2013); FP (2016–2020)
- Children: 2
- Education: University of Lima
- Occupation: Opinion journalist • Politician

María Lourdes Pía Luisa Alcorta Suero (born 21 June 1951) is a Peruvian author, social communicator, Fujimorist politician and a former Congresswoman representing Lima from 2006 to 2019.

== Early life ==
She graduated from Colegio Sagrado Corazón Sophianum school, in San Isidro, and studied advertising and marketing at Pontificia Universidad Católica del Perú. Alcorta worked in the private sector until 2003: she started as a television producer, then became accountancy director for the advertising agencies "Peruana de Publicidad" and "Forum"; she would later form her own agency, "Alma Publicidad". Also, she worked as a public speaker in advertising and marketing seminars, and has recently participated in governance, national security, and death penalty for child rapists seminars.

== Political career ==
In 2013, she resigned from the Christian People's Party and from the Alliance for the Great Change, and joined the Regional Union group, and is elected councillor of Lima's San Isidro District. In 2006, she is elected to Congress for the 2006–2011 term on the National Unity list. In the 2011 election, she is re-elected for another five-year term on the ticket of the Alliance for the Great Change, to which the Christian democrats now belong. In the 2016 election, she was re-elected for another five-year term this time on the Fujimorist Popular Force and left office in 2019 following to the dissolution of the Congress.
