= Saint Aloysius Gonzaga National University =

University in Peru

Coordinates: 14.087°S 75.733°W

Saint Aloysius Gonzaga National University (Spanish: Universidad Nacional San Luis Gonzaga) is a university in Ica, Peru. It was created in the city of Ica, approximately 300 kilometres (190 mi) south of the capital, Lima.

The Saint Aloysius Gonzaga National University is established due to concerns of the town of Ica, that it demanded an institution of superior studies for those that had professional aspirations.

On December 20, 1955, after many unexpected delays, Saint Aloysius Gonzaga created the "National University of Ica", by law Nº12495. It was managed by the then senator of Ica, Don Felix Temistocles Rocha Rebatta, during the Government of General Manuel Odría; producing in the town of Ica one of his greater points of pride. After five years, the town felt offended, since the university did not carry out its intentions, making excuses of budgetary character, and even a proposal for the cancellation of the law Nº21495 on the part of the House of Representatives.

Many groups participated in the fight to make the operation of the University a reality, such as the Departmental Civic Front of Ica, the Union of Primary Teachers of Ica, the Association of Ex-Sanluisanos of the Nocturnal one, Bigheaded the Víctor Rock Pacheco and the Committee Pro Operation. Additionally, they were joined by the Association of Parents of Family of the G.U.E. "San Luis Gonzaga", the Junior Camera, the Rotary Club, the Social Union of Ica, the Club of Lions, etc.

After many requests and misfortunes, on February 18, 1961, a historical and significant date for the town of Ica, the Organizing Commission of the University in the premises of the library of the G.U.E formed. "San Luis Gonzaga", presided over by the Dr. Manuel Beltroy, and integrated by Luis Felipe Ricci Bohórquez, Oscar Escate Fields, Otto Cockburn Alvarado, Atilio Nieri Boggiano, Carlos Luján Castillo and Lorenzo Pezzia Assereto; officially opened for operation, a fact that made possible by means of Ministerial Resolution Nº 137 on 18 February 1961.
