= Ministry of Women and Vulnerable Populations =

Government ministry of Peru

- Ministerio de la Mujer y Poblaciones Vulnerables
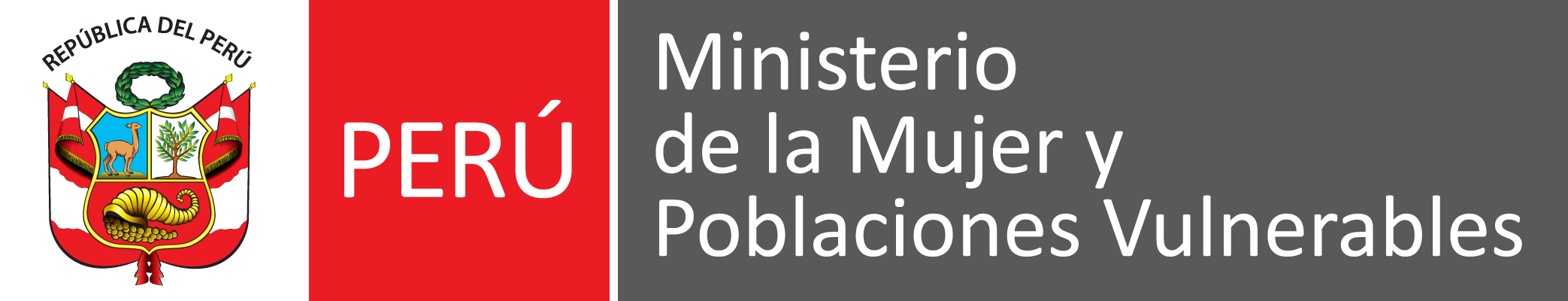

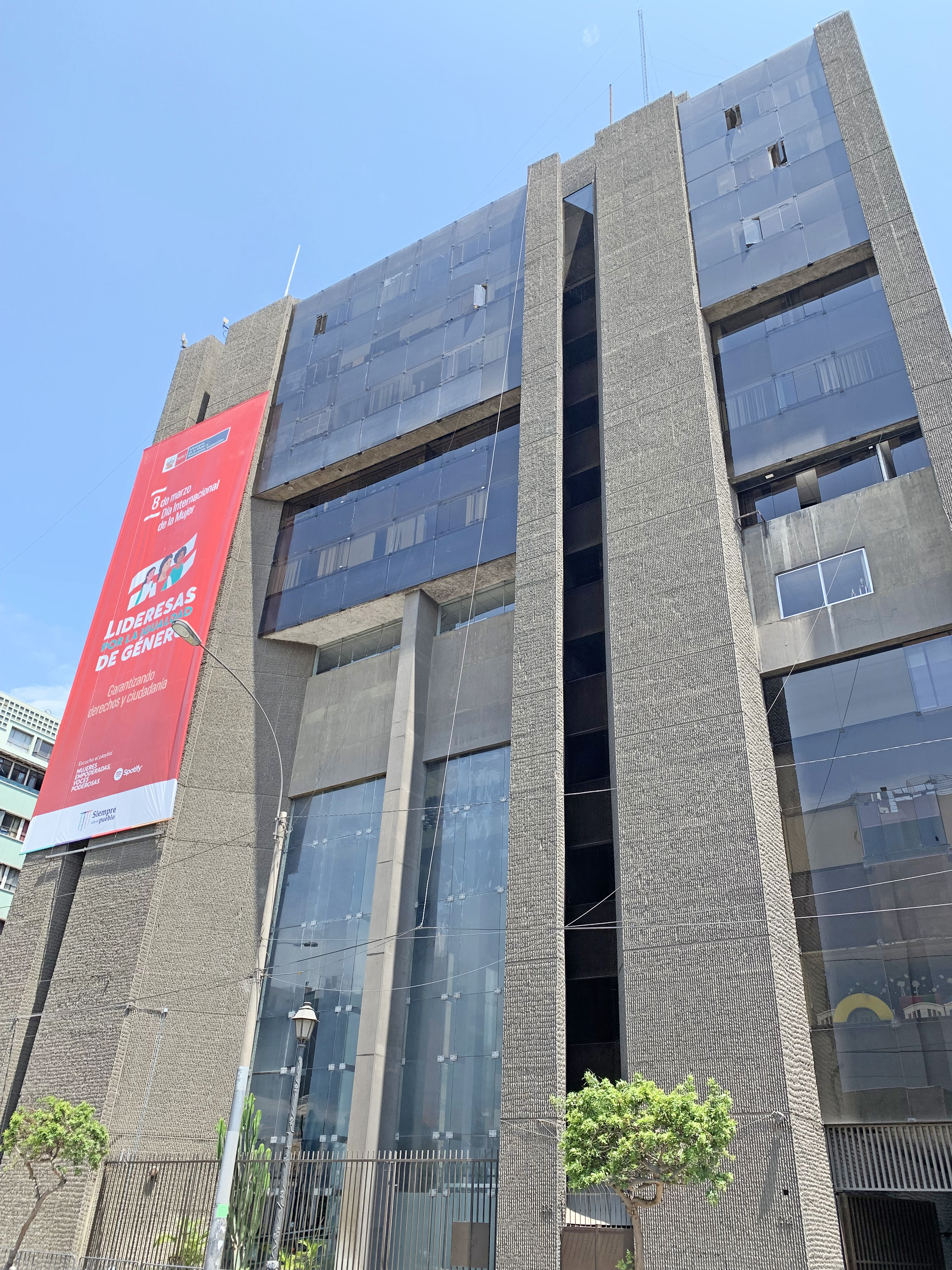

Agency overview
- Formed: 29 October 1996; 29 years ago
- Headquarters: 616 Jirón Camaná, Lima
- Minister responsible: Sandra Gutiérrez Cuba
- Website: www.mimp.gob.pe

The Ministry of Women and Vulnerable Populations (Spanish: Ministerio de la Mujer y Poblaciones Vulnerables, MIMP) of Peru is the government ministry in charge of national policy regarding women and vulnerable populations. Its headquarters are located in Lima, Peru.

It is the only ministry in the country's government whose office is exclusive to women. As of 2025, the minister is Fanny Montellanos.

== History ==
The ministry was created on October 29, 1996 and was originally named Ministry of the Promotion of Women and of Human Development (Spanish: Ministerio de Promoción de la Mujer y del Desarrollo Humano, PROMUDEH). Its creation was announced by then-president Alberto Fujimori in Cologne during the 1996 Latin American Week and the German Conference on the Latin American Economy. In 2002 it was renamed as Ministry of Women and Social Development.

Subsequently, on July 11, 2002, Organic Law 27779 amended the organization of the Council of Ministers of Peru, which renamed it the Ministry of Women and Social Development (Spanish: Ministerio de la Mujer y Desarrollo Social, MIMDES). However, the Latin American Committee for the Defence of Women's Rights had criticised the possible restructuring of the body. In 2012, it received its current name.

In 2004, the Order of Merit for Women was established through Supreme Decree 005-2003-MIMDES.

In 2024, proposals to restructure the ministry to that of "Family and Vulnerable Populations" were introduced.

== Organisation ==
- General Secretariat
- Vice Ministry of Women
  - Directorate-General of Gender Equality and Non-Discrimination
  - Directorate-General of Gender Mainstreaming
  - Directorate-General against Gender Violence
- Vice Ministry of Vulnerable Populations
  - Directorate-General of Population, Development, and Volunteering
  - Directorate-General of Family and Community
  - Directorate-General of Children and Adolescents
  - Directorate-General of Adoptions

Entities administered by the ministry include:

- National Council for the Integration of Persons with Disabilities (CONADIS)
- National Comprehensive Programme for Family Welfare (INABIF)
- National Programme Against Domestic and Sexual Violence
- National Yachay Programme
- National Dignified Life Programme
- Severe Disability Pension Programme

== List of ministers ==
| Name | Party | Period | |
| Name | Party | Term start | Term end |
|---|---|---|---|
Ministers for the Promotion of Women and of Human Development
| Miriam Schenone Ordinola | —N/a | November 5, 1996 | January 5, 1999 |
| Luisa María Cuculiza Torre | Cambio 90 | January 6, 1999 | November 25, 2000 |
| Susana Villarán de la Puente | —N/a | November 25, 2000 | July 28, 2001 |
| Doris Sánchez Pinedo | Perú Posible | July 28, 2001 | January 21, 2002 |
| Cecilia Blondet Montero | Perú Posible | January 21, 2002 | July 12, 2002 |
Ministers of Women and Social Development
| Ana María Romero-Lozada Lauerazzi | —N/a | July 12, 2002 | June 28, 2003 |
| Ana Elena Townsend Diez-Canseco | Perú Posible | June 28, 2003 | December 15, 2003 |
| Nidia Puelles Becerra | —N/a | December 15, 2003 | December 19, 2003 |
| Ana María Romero-Lozada Lauerazzi | —N/a | December 19, 2003 | July 28, 2006 |
| Virginia Borra Toledo | APRA | July 28, 2006 | December 20, 2007 |
| Susana Pinilla Cisneros | APRA | December 20, 2007 | October 14, 2008 |
| Carmen Vildoso Chirinos | —N/a | October 14, 2008 | June 12, 2009 |
| Nidia Vílchez Yucra | APRA | June 12, 2009 | September 14, 2010 |
| Virginia Borra Toledo | APRA | September 14, 2010 | July 28, 2011 |
| Aída García-Naranjo Morales | Partido Socialista | July 28, 2011 | December 11, 2011 |
Ministers of Women and Vulnerable Populations
| Ana Jara Velásquez | PNP | December 11, 2011 | February 24, 2014 |
| Carmen Omonte Durand | Perú Posible | February 24, 2014 | February 17, 2015 |
| Marcela Huaita Alegre | —N/a | February 17, 2015 | July 28, 2016 |
| Ana María Romero-Lozada Lauerazzi | —N/a | July 28, 2016 | July 27, 2017 |
| Ana María Choquehuanca | PPK | July 27, 2017; March 23, 2018 | March 23, 2018; April 2, 2018 |
| Ana María Mendieta Trefogli | PPK | April 2, 2018 | March 11, 2019 |
| Gloria Montenegro Figueroa | APP | March 11, 2019 | August 6, 2020 |
| Rosario Sasieta Morales | —N/a | August 6, 2020 | November 10, 2020 |
| Patricia Teullet Pipoli | —N/a | November 12, 2020 | November 17, 2020 |
| Silvia Loli Espinoza | —N/a | November 18, 2020 | July 29, 2021 |
| Anahí Durand | Nuevo Perú | July 29, 2021 | February 1, 2022 |
| Katy Ugarte Mamani | Perú Libre | February 1, 2022 | February 8, 2022 |
| Diana Miloslavich Túpac | —N/a | February 8, 2022 | August 24, 2022 |
| Claudia Dávila Moscoso | —N/a | August 24, 2022 | November 24, 2022 |
| Heidy Juárez Calle | Podemos Perú | November 24, 2022 | December 7, 2022 |
| Grecia Rojas Ortiz | —N/a | December 10, 2022 | January 13, 2023 |
| Nancy Tolentino Gamarra | —N/a | January 13, 2023 | April 1, 2024 |
| Ángela Hernández Cajo | Somos Perú | April 1, 2024 | January 31, 2025 |
| Fanny Montellanos | —N/a | January 31, 2025 | Incumbent |

== See also ==
- Women in Peru
