= César Villanueva =

Peruvian politician (born 1946)

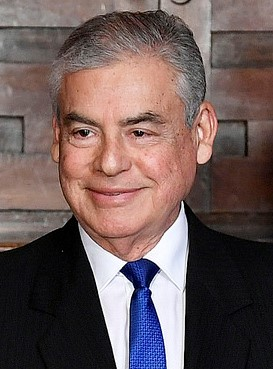

Prime Minister of Peru
- In office April 2, 2018 – March 8, 2019
- President: Martín Vizcarra
- Preceded by: Mercedes Aráoz
- Succeeded by: Salvador del Solar
- In office October 31, 2013 – February 24, 2014
- President: Ollanta Humala
- Preceded by: Juan Jiménez Mayor
- Succeeded by: René Cornejo

Member of Congress
- In office July 26, 2016 – September 30, 2019
- Constituency: San Martín

2nd Governor of San Martín
- In office January 1, 2007 – October 31, 2013
- Lieutenant: Javier Ocampo Ruiz
- Preceded by: Max Ramírez García
- Succeeded by: Javier Ocampo Ruiz

Personal details
- Born: César Villanueva Arévalo; 5 August 1946 (age 80) Tarapoto, Peru
- Party: Independent
- Other political affiliations: Alliance for Progress (2016-2019); Alliance for the Progress of Peru (2016)
- Education: Federico Villarreal National; University

César Villanueva Arévalo (born 5 August 1946) is a Peruvian politician who was the prime minister of Peru from April 2018 to March 2019, and previously served as prime minister from October 2013 to February 2014. In 2007, he became governor of the San Martín Region. He was sworn in as prime minister by President Ollanta Humala on 31 October 2013, and is affiliated with centre-left parties. In the 2016 general elections, he was elected congressman representing San Martin under the Alliance for the Progress of Peru of César Acuña.

== Early life ==
Villanueva was born on August 5, 1946, in Tarapoto city. He studied administration at the National University Federico Villarreal (UNFV).

== Political career ==
=== Governor of San Martín ===
In January 2007, he became governor of San Martín after winning the election in November 2006 and was re-elected for a second term in the 2010 regional elections and served until he was appointed prime minister in 2013. During his term as governor, he served as president of the National Assembly of Regional Governments for two terms, between 2008 and 2009 and 2012 and 2013.

=== Prime Minister of Peru ===
==== First tenure ====
He became Prime Minister of Peru on October 31, 2013. On February 24, 2014, he resigned from the position of Premier, after the Minister of Economy Luis Miguel Castilla Rubio denied him on a television program his claim that he had spoken with him about a possible increase in the minimum wage. Days before, the first lady Nadine Heredia had also said that the issue of the minimum wage was not on the government's agenda. Faced with this series of denials, the opposition severely criticized the minister, describing me as just a "decorative figure." 7 Years later, before the Congressional Oversight Commission, Villanueva confirmed that he had resigned as a protest against the constant interference of Nadine Heredia in State issues, despite not having any position of public representation.

==== Second tenure ====
He became prime minister for a second time in April 2018, under President Martín Vizcarra. He presented his resignation in March 2019. He was replaced by Salvador del Solar.

=== Congressman ===
In the 2016 general elections, he was elected congressman representing the San Martin region under the Alliance for Progress of César Acuña.

== Controversies ==
=== Arrest ===
On 26 November 2019, he was arrested preventatively, while being investigated for alleged influence peddling in a bribery case linked to Brazilian construction giant Odebrecht. His arrest was a request of the First Supreme Prosecutor's Office Specialized in crimes of Corruption of Officials, this under the orders of the prosecutor Jesús Fernández Alarcón, who requested a preliminary arrest warrant for seven days against him.

Political offices
Preceded by Juan Jiménez Mayor	Prime Minister of Peru; 2013–2014	Succeeded by René Cornejo
