= René Cornejo =

Peruvian politician

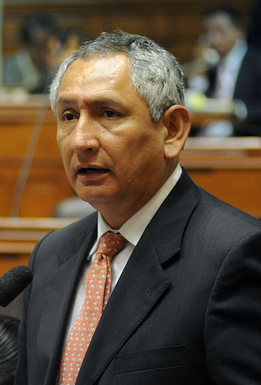

Prime Minister of Peru
- In office 24 February 2014 – 22 July 2014
- President: Ollanta Humala
- Preceded by: César Villanueva
- Succeeded by: Ana Jara

Minister of Housing, Construction and Sanitation
- In office 28 July 2011 – 24 February 2014
- President: Ollanta Humala
- Prime Minister: Salomon Lerner; Oscar Valdés; Juan Jiménez; César Villanueva
- Preceded by: Juan Sarmiento Soto
- Succeeded by: Milton von Hesse

Personal details
- Born: 6 January 1962 (age 64) Arequipa, Peru
- Party: Independent
- Education: National University of Engineering; Central American; Technological University; Pontifical Catholic University of Peru; ESADE Graduate School of Business Administration and Management

René Cornejo Diaz (born 6 January 1962 in Arequipa, Peru) is a Peruvian politician who was Prime Minister of Peru from February to July 2014, following the resignation of César Villanueva. He resigned after a political scandal that involved his office. He was replaced by the Minister of Labor Ana Jara.

== Early life and career ==
Cornejo was born on 6 January 1962 in Arequipa, Peru. He studied at National University of Engineering, Central American Technological University, Pontifical Catholic University of Peru and ESADE Business School. He has an engineering degree from the National University of Engineering and an MBA from ESAN Graduate School of Business and is Doctoral Candidate at ESADE Graduate School of Business Administration and Management. He has also served as executive director of ProInversion, the country's investment promotion enterprise.

== Political career ==
Since President Ollanta Humala took office Cornejo has served as housing minister.

=== Prime minister ===
After the resignation of Prime Minister César Villanueva, he was appointed the replacement by the president on 24 February 2014. Other cabinet reshuffles included: Piero Ghezzi Solis replacing Gladys Triveño as Minister of Production; Eleodoro Mayorga Alba replacing Jorge Merino as Ministry of Energy and Mines; Jose Gallardo Ku as Minister of Housing; Carmen Omonte Durand replacing Ana Jara as Minister of Women and Vulnerable Populations; and Jara replacing Teresa Laos Caceres as Minister of Labor. He and his ministerial cabinet obtained the Congress vote of confidence on 17 March 2014 after two unsuccessful attempts.

==== Resignation ====
He resigned in July 2014 following an investigation report by Cuarto Poder alleging that an unnamed "close advisor" gave money to an informer to find potentially incriminating information on opposition Congressman Víctor Andrés García Belaúnde to discredit him.

Political offices
Preceded by César Villanueva	Prime Minister of Peru; 2014	Succeeded by Ana Jara
