= Virginia Borra Toledo =

Peruvian politician

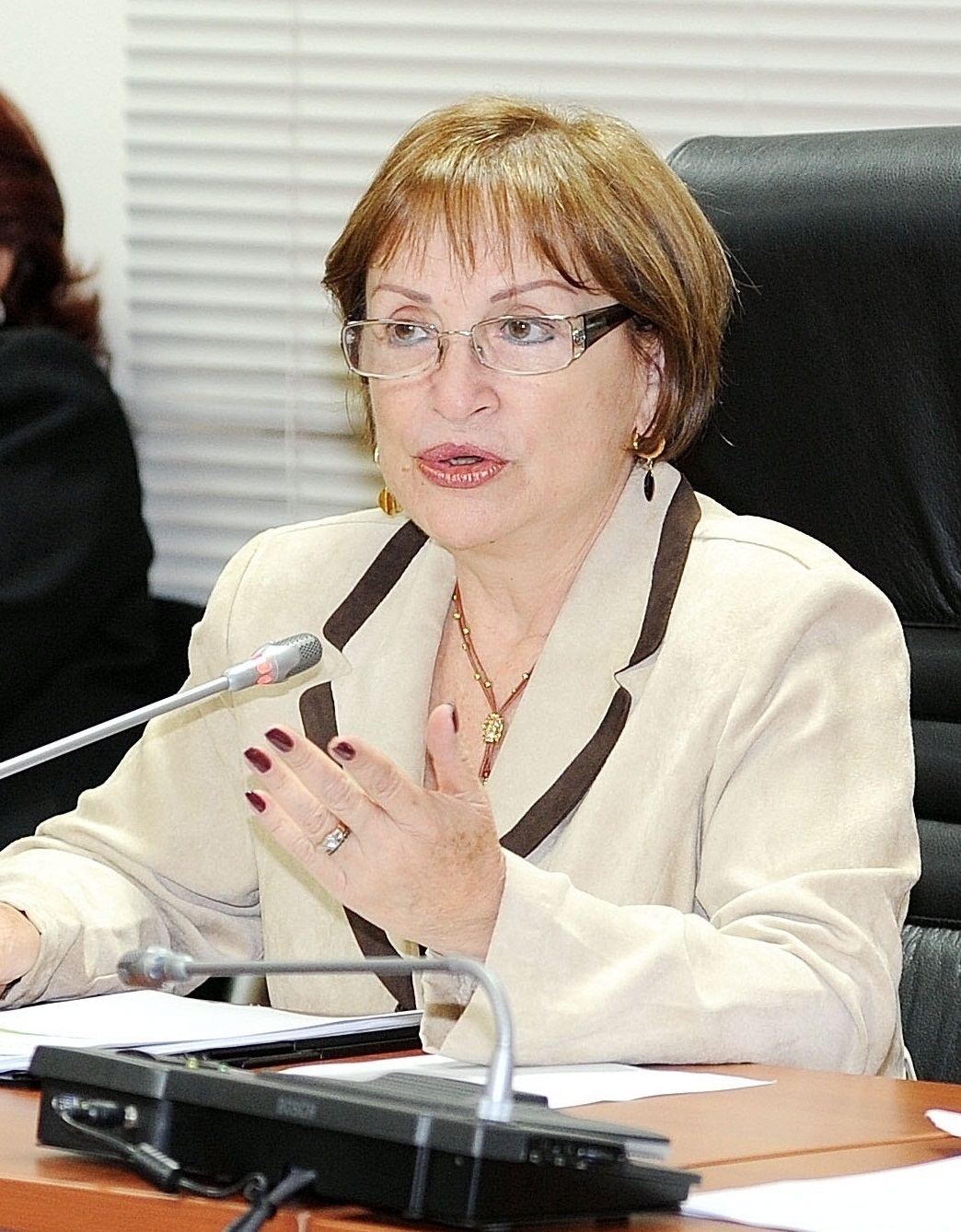
Virginia B. Toledo

Virginia Borra Toledo de Jiménez has been the Peruvian Minister of Women's Issues and Social Development under President Alan García since September 2010.
