= Ollanta Humala =

President of Peru from 2011 to 2016

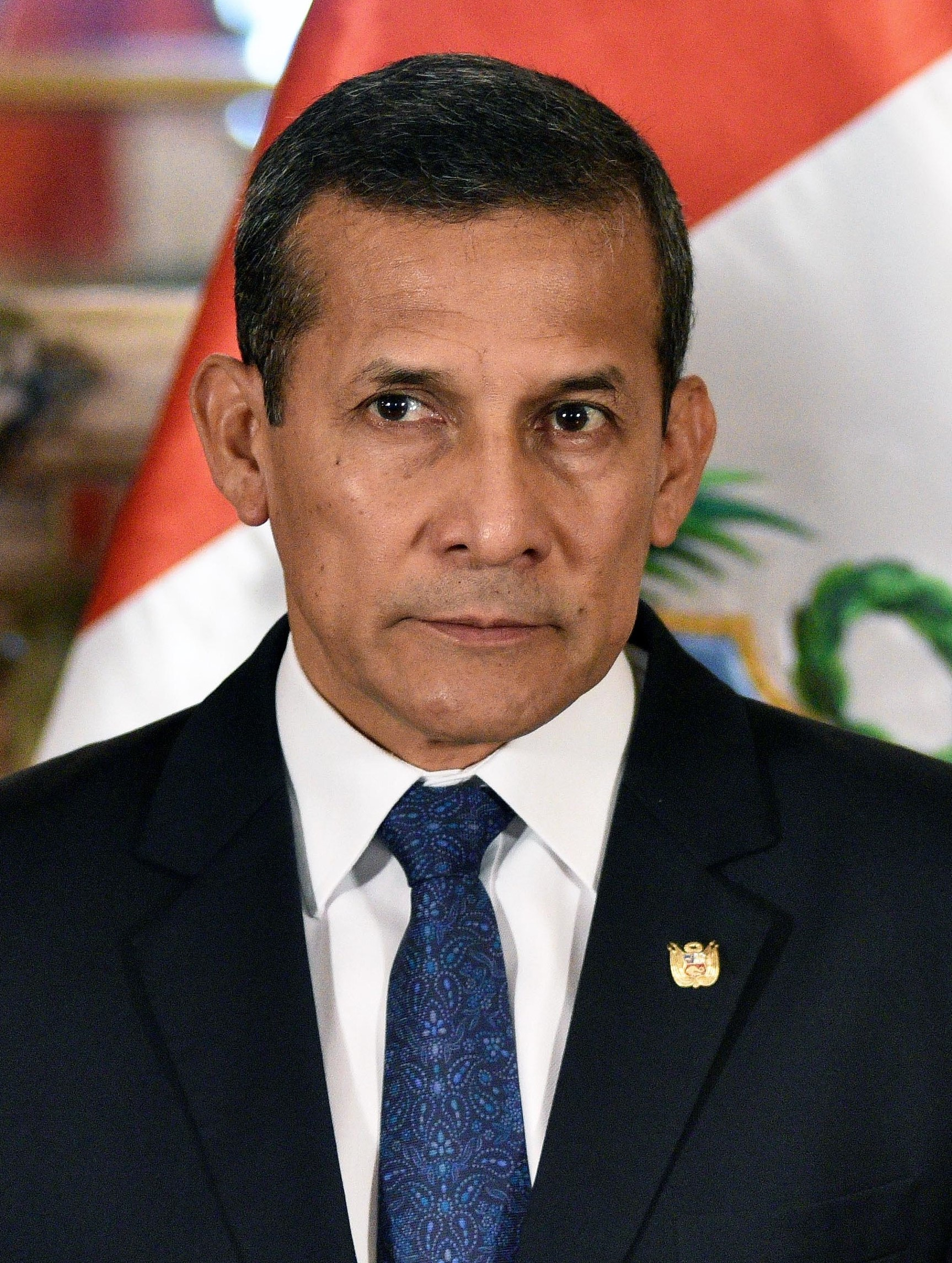
- Humala in 2016

President of Peru
- In office 28 July 2011 – 28 July 2016
- Prime Minister: See list: Salomón Lerner Ghitis Óscar Valdés Juan Jiménez Mayor César Villanueva René Cornejo Ana Jara Pedro Cateriano
- Vice President: First Vice President; Marisol Espinoza; Second Vice President; Omar Chehade (2011–2012); Vacant (2012–2016)
- Preceded by: Alan García
- Succeeded by: Pedro Pablo Kuczynski

President of the Peruvian Nationalist Party
- In office 26 August 2016 – 9 September 2021
- Preceded by: Nadine Heredia
- Succeeded by: Office abolished
- In office 3 October 2005 – 30 December 2013
- Preceded by: Office created
- Succeeded by: Nadine Heredia
Additional positions
President pro tempore of the Union of South American Nations
In office 29 June 2012 – 30 August 2013
Preceded by	Fernando Lugo
Succeeded by	Dési Bouterse
President pro tempore of the Pacific Alliance
In office 3 July 2015 – 1 July 2016
Preceded by	Enrique Peña Nieto
Succeeded by	Michelle Bachelet

Personal details
- Born: 27 June 1962 (age 64) Lima, Peru
- Party: Peruvian Nationalist Party
- Other political affiliations: Peru Wins (2010–2012); Union for Peru (2006)
- Spouse: Nadine Heredia (m. 1999)
- Children: 3
- Relatives: Antauro Humala (brother)
- Education: Chorrillos Military School (BS); Pontifical Catholic University of Peru (MA)
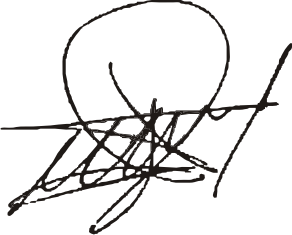
- Signature

Military service
- Allegiance: Peru
- Branch/service: Peruvian Army
- Years of service: 1981–2005
- Rank: Lieutenant colonel
- Battles/wars: Internal conflict in Peru; Cenepa War

Ollanta Moisés Humala Tasso (Note: Spanish pronunciation: [oˈʝanta mojˈses uˈmala ˈtaso]) (born 27 June 1962) is a Peruvian former military officer and politician who served as president of Peru from 2011 to 2016. A leftist, he founded the Peruvian Nationalist Party, but shifted towards neoliberalism and the political centre during his presidency.

Born to a prominent political family affiliated with the ethnocacerist movement, Humala is the son of Quechua labour lawyer Isaac Humala. He entered the Peruvian Army in 1981, eventually achieving the rank of lieutenant colonel. During his time in the military, he fought in the internal conflict against left-wing terrorist group Shining Path as well as in the Cenepa War with neighboring Ecuador. In October 2000, Humala attempted an unsuccessful coup d'etat against President Alberto Fujimori during the final days of his regime; eventually, the Congress of the Republic of Peru granted him amnesty and he was allowed to return to military duty.

Humala entered electoral politics in 2005, founding the Peruvian Nationalist Party (PNP) in order to run in the 2006 Peruvian general election. After finishing first in the opening round, he lost the runoff by a narrow margin to the centre-left former president and Peruvian Aprista Party nominee Alan García. His campaign received widespread international attention in 2006 given the pink tide in Latin America.

In the 2011 Peruvian general election, Humala ran again, defeating Keiko Fujimori of the right-wing Force 2011 in the runoff. To allay fears of radical policies, Humala filled much of his cabinet with centrists at the start of his term. His presidency proved unpopular and was overshadowed by corruption allegations involving him and Nadine Heredia. Environmentalists were highly critical of Humala's mining policies, and argued that he reneged on his campaign promise to rein in mining companies.

In 2017, Humala was arrested by Peruvian authorities on corruption charges. Humala attempted a political comeback in the 2021 presidential election, but only received 1.5% of the vote, finishing in 13th place. In 2025, he and Heredia were convicted of money laundering linked to the Brazilian construction company Odebrecht and each sentenced to 15 years' imprisonment; Heredia was granted diplomatic asylum by Brazil and remains there. As of 2026, Humala was the last Peruvian president to serve a full term, with most of his successors either resigning or being impeached.

== Early life, family, and education ==
Humala was born in Lima, Peru on 27 June 1962. His father Isaac Humala, who is of Quechua ethnicity, is a labor lawyer, member of the Communist Party of Peru – Red Fatherland, and ideological leader of the Ethnocacerista movement. Ollanta's mother is Elena Tasso, from an old Italian family established in Peru at the end of the 19th century. He is the brother of Antauro Humala, who later served a 25-year prison sentence for kidnapping 17 police officers for 3 days and killing 4 of them in the Andahuaylas uprising and whose party Union for Peru was involved in the removal of former President Martín Vizcarra in 2020. Another brother is the academic and politician Ulises Humala. Humala attended the French-Peruvian school Franco-Peruano, and later the "Colegio Cooperativo La Union," established by part of the Peruvian-Japanese community in Lima.

He began his military career in 1980 when he entered the Chorrillos Military School, like his brother Antauro (who had done so a year earlier). In 1983, he was a student at the School of the Americas (SOA), in the cadet combat course. He graduated as an Artillery lieutenant on 1 January 1984, forming part of the "Heroes of Pucará and Marcavalle" class.

In 1997, he earned the graduate diploma of PADE in Business Administration from ESAN Graduate School of Business. In 2001, he completed a master's degree at the Center for Higher National Studies (CAEN) in National Defense and in 2002, he successfully completed a master's degree in political science at the Pontifical Catholic University of Peru.

== Military career ==
In his military career, Humala was also involved in the two major Peruvian conflicts of the past 20 years, the battle against the insurgent organization Shining Path and the 1995 Cenepa War with Ecuador. In 1991, with the rank of captain, Humala served in Tingo María, Huanuco fighting the remnants of the Shining Path and in 1995 he served in the Cenepa War on the border with Ecuador.

=== 2000 uprising ===
In October 2000, Humala led an uprising in Toquepala against Alberto Fujimori on his last days as president due to multiple corruption scandals. The main reason given for the rebellion was the capture of Vladimiro Montesinos, former intelligence chief who had fled Peru for asylum in Panama after being caught on video trying to bribe an opposition congressman. The return of Montesinos led to fears that he still had much power in Fujimori's government, so Humala and about 40 other Peruvian soldiers revolted against their senior army commander. Montesinos claims that the uprising facilitated his concurrent escape.

Many of Humala's men deserted him, leaving him only 7 soldiers. During the revolt, Humala called on Peruvian "patriots" to join him in the rebellion, and around 300 former soldiers led by his brother Antauro answered his call and were reported to have been in a convoy attempting to join up with Humala. The revolt gained some sympathy from the Peruvian populace with the influential opposition newspaper La República calling him "valiant and decisive, unlike most in Peru". The newspaper also had many letters sent in by readers with accolades to Ollanta and his men.

In the aftermath, the Army sent hundreds of soldiers to capture the rebels. Even so, Humala and his men managed to hide until President Fujimori was impeached from office a few days later and Valentín Paniagua was named interim president. Finally, on 10 December, both brothers surrendered, being transferred to Lima, where they surrendered to the Second Judicial Zone of the country. The opening of the process was ruled for rebellion, sedition and insult to the superior. The lawyer Javier Valle Riestra requested an amnesty for the Humala, alleging that they had exercised the "right to insurrection against an illegitimate and totalitarian government." On 21 December 2000, Congress granted them the requested amnesty, which was extended to military and civilian personnel who participated in the insurrection and Humala was allowed to return to military duty.

=== Post-Fujimori regime ===
In 2002, Humala received a master's degree in political science from the Pontifical Catholic University of Peru.

He was sent as military attaché to Paris, then to Seoul until December 2004, when he was forcibly retired. His forced retirement is suspected to have partly motivated an etnocacerista rebellion in Andahuaylas led by his brother Antauro Humala in January 2005.

== Political career ==
=== 2006 presidential campaign ===
In October 2005 Humala created the Partido Nacionalista Peruano (the Peruvian Nationalist Party) and ran for the presidency in 2006 with the support of Union for Peru (UPP).

Ambassador Javier Pérez de Cuéllar, the former Peruvian Secretary-General of the United Nations and founder of UPP, told the press on 5 December 2005, that he did not support the election of Humala as the party's presidential candidate. He said that after being the UPP presidential candidate in 1995, he had not had any further contact with UPP and therefore did not take part in choosing Humala as the party's presidential candidate for the 2006 elections.

There were some accusations that he incurred in torture, under the nom de guerre "Capitán Carlos" ("Captain Carlos"), while he was the commander of a military base in the jungle region of Madre Mia from 1992 to 1993. His brother Antauro Humala stated in 2006 that Humala had used such a name during their activities. Humala, in an interview with Jorge Ramos, acknowledged that he went under the pseudonym Captain Carlos but stated that other soldiers went under the same name and denied participation in any human rights abuses.

On 17 March 2006, Humala's campaign came under some controversy as his father, Issac Humala, said "If I was President, I would grant amnesty to him (Abimael Guzmán) and the other incarcerated members of the Shining Path". He made similar statements about amnesty for Víctor Polay, the leader of the Túpac Amaru Revolutionary Movement, and other leaders of the MRTA. But Ollanta Humala distanced himself from the more radical members of his family during his campaign. Humala's mother, meanwhile, made a statement on 21 March calling for homosexuals to be shot.

Ollanta Humala's brother, Ulises Humala, ran against him in the election, but was considered an extremely minor candidate and came in 14th place in the election.

On 9 April 2006, the first round of the Peruvian national election was held. Humala came in first place getting 30.62% of the valid votes, and immediately began preparing to face Alan García, who obtained 24.32%, in a runoff election on 4 June. Humala campaigned in Trujillo, an eminently Aprista city, during the last week of April. Starting in May, he visited the department of Ayacucho and then the city of Puno. On 9 May, he met again with Bolivian President Evo Morales, in the border town of Copacabana and received the support of the aforementioned president.

Different Peruvian media opposed to Ollanta Humala, indicated at a certain point that the Canarian journalist Ramón Pérez Almodóvar would be advising the presidential candidate for the second electoral round, an accusation that was denied by the journalist, although he admitted that he was participating in the campaign.

On 20 May 2006, the day before the first presidential debate between Alan García and Ollanta Humala, a tape of the former Peruvian intelligence chief Vladimiro Montesinos was released by Montesinos' lawyer to the press with Montesinos claiming that Humala had started the 29 October 2000 military uprising against the Fujimori government to facilitate his escape from Peru amidst corruption scandals. Montesinos is quoted as saying it was a "farce, an operation of deception and manipulation".

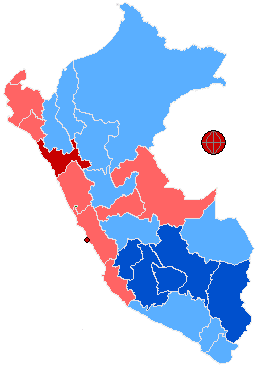
Geographic distribution of Second Round votes, by winning candidate: Alan García, >2/3 of valid votes Alan García, <2/3 of valid votes Ollanta Humala, >2/3 Ollanta Humala, <2/3

Humala immediately responded to the charges by accusing Montesinos of being in collaboration with García's Aprista Party with an intention to undermine his candidacy. Humala is quoted as stating "I want to declare my indignation at the statements" and went on to say "Who benefits from the declarations that stain the honor of Ollanta Humala? Evidently they benefit Alan García". In another message that Montesinos released to the media through his lawyer he claimed that Humala was a "political pawn" of Cuban President Fidel Castro and Venezuelan President Hugo Chávez in an "asymmetric war" against the United States. Montesinos went on to state that Humala "is not a new ideologist or political reformer, but he is an instrument".

On 24 May 2006, Humala warned of possible voter fraud in the upcoming second round elections scheduled for 4 June. He urged UPP supporters to register as poll watchers "so votes are not stolen from us during the tabulation at the polling tables." Humala went on to cite similar claims of voting fraud in the first round made by right-wing National Unity candidate Lourdes Flores when she told reporters that she felt she had "lost at the tabulation tables, not at the ballot box". When asked if he had proof for his claims by CPN Radio Humala stated "I do not have proof. If I had the proof, I would immediately denounce those responsible to the electoral system". Alan García responded by stating that Humala was "crying fraud" because the polls show him losing the second round.

On 4 June 2006, the second round of the Peruvian elections were held. With 77% of votes counted and Humala behind García 45.5% to 55.5% respectively, Humala conceded defeat to Alan García and congratulated his opponent's campaign stating at a news conference "we recognise the results...and we salute the forces that competed against us, those of Mr Garcia".

=== Post-election ===
On 12 June 2006, Carlos Torres Caro, Humala's vice presidential running mate and elected Congressman for the Union for Peru (UPP), stated that a faction of the UPP would split off from the party after disagreements with Humala to create what Torres calls a "constructive opposition". The split came after Humala called on leftist parties to form an alliance with the UPP to become the principal opposition party in Congress. Humala had met with representatives of the Communist Party of Peru – Red Fatherland and the New Left Movement. Humala stated that the opposition would work to "make sure Garcia complies with his electoral promises" and again stated that he would not boycott García's inauguration on 28 July 2006.

On 16 August 2006, prosecutors in Peru filed charges against Humala for alleged human rights abuses including forced disappearance, torture, and murder against Shining Path guerillas during his service in San Martín. Humala responded by denying the charges and stating that he was "a victim of political persecution". He said the charges were "orchestrated by the Alan Garcia administration to neutralize any alternative to his power".

=== 2011 election ===
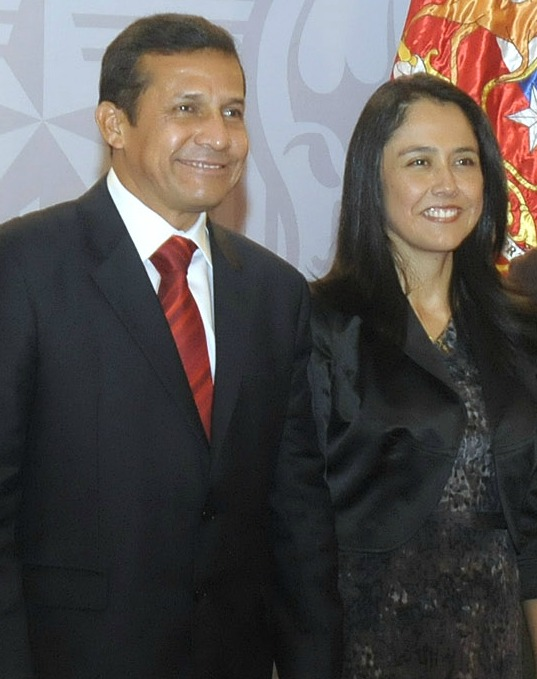
Humala with his wife

Humala ran again in the Peruvian general election on 10 April 2011, with Marisol Espinoza his candidate for First Vice President and Omar Chehade as Second Vice President.

For these elections, he formed the electoral alliance "Gana Peru", around the already existing Peruvian Nationalist Party. Later, he signed a political agreement with several left-wing parties such as the Peruvian Communist Party, the Socialist Party, the Revolutionary Socialist Party, the Socialist Voice Political Movement, and an important sector of the Lima for All Political Movement.

Humala was in first place in the first round held on 10 April, obtaining 31.72% of the total valid votes. Because he did not manage to exceed 50% of the valid votes, he went on to a second round with the candidate Keiko Fujimori, which took place on 5 June.

On 19 May, at National University of San Marcos and with the support of many Peruvian intellectuals and artists (including Mario Vargas Llosa with reservations), Ollanta Humala signed the "Compromiso en Defensa de la Democracia". He campaigned as a center-left leader with the desire to help to create a more equitable framework for distributing the wealth from the country's key natural resources, with the goal of maintaining foreign investment and economic growth in the country while working to improve the condition of an impoverished majority.

Going into the 5 June runoff election, he was polling in a statistical tie with opponent Keiko Fujimori. He was elected the 94th president of Peru with 51.5% of the vote.

Three days after his election, Humala undertook a Latin American tour to meet with the heads of state of Brazil, Uruguay, Paraguay, Argentina, Chile, Bolivia, Ecuador, Colombia, the United States, Venezuela, Mexico and Cuba.

== Presidency (2011–2016) ==
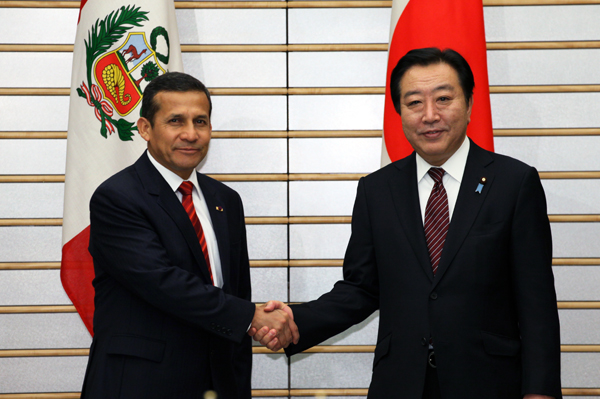
Humala meets with Japanese Prime Minister Yoshihiko Noda in Tokyo, 9 May 2012

After the news of the election of Ollanta as president the Lima Stock Exchange experienced its largest drop ever, though it later stabilised following the announcement of Humala's cabinet appointees, who were judged to be moderate and in line with continuity. However he was also said to have inherited "a ticking time bomb of disputes stemming in large part from objections by indigenous groups to the damage to water supplies, crops, and hunting grounds wrought by mining, logging and oil and gas extraction" from Alan Garcia. Though he promised the "poor and disenfranchised" Peruvians a bigger stake in the rapidly growing national economy, his "mandate for change...[was seen as] a mandate for moderate change"; his moderation was reflected in his "orthodox" cabinet appointees and his public oath on the Bible to respect investor rights, rule of law and the constitution. He was sworn in on 28 July 2011.

As part of his "social inclusion" rhetoric during the campaign, his government, led by Prime Minister Salomon Lerner Ghitis, established the Ministry of Development and Social Inclusion in order to coordinate the efficacy of his social programmes. Lerner Ghitis later resigned on 10 December 2011, and was succeeded by Óscar Valdés Dancuart.

On 23 July 2012, Juan Jiménez Mayor became president of a new ministerial cabinet, the third in less than a year.

On 24 July 2013, with the appointment of three new ministers (Mónica Rubio García in Development and Social Inclusion, Magali Silva in Foreign Trade and Tourism, and Diana Álvarez Calderón in Culture), it was achieved, for the first time in the history of Peru, gender equality in the formation of a ministerial cabinet (9 men and 9 women, apart from the prime minister).

On 31 October 2013, César Villanueva, who until then served as president of the Regional Government of San Martín, was sworn in as the fourth President of the Council of Ministers of the Humala government.

On 24 February 2014, the fifth ministerial cabinet was sworn in, chaired by René Cornejo, who until then had served as Minister of Housing, Construction and Sanitation. After two unsuccessful attempts, this cabinet finally won the vote of confidence in Congress, in the session held on 17 March.

On 22 July 2014 René Cornejo resigned, being replaced by Ana Jara, who until then was the head of the Ministry of Labor and Employment Promotion, an office that was taken over by the ruling congressman Fredy Otárola. With only these changes, the sixth cabinet of the government of President Humala was sworn in.

On 30 March 2015, the full Congress censured Prime Minister Ana Jara and her entire cabinet, with 72 votes in favor, 42 against and 2 abstentions. Something similar had not happened since 1963, when the parliament censured the cabinet chaired by Julio Óscar Trelles Montes. The argument used against Jara was the monitoring of politicians, businessmen, and journalists by the National Intelligence Directorate (DINI). Pedro Cateriano replaced Jara as Prime Minister on 2 April 2015.

Originally considered to be a socialist and left-wing nationalist, he is considered to have shifted towards neoliberalism and the political centre during his presidency.

=== Ideology ===
Ollanta Humala expressed sympathy for the regime of Juan Velasco Alvarado, which took power in a bloodless military coup on 3 October 1968, and nationalized various Peruvian industries whilst pursuing a favorable foreign policy with Cuba and the Soviet Union.

During his presidential candidacy in 2006 and his run for the presidency that he ultimately won in 2011, Humala was closely affiliated with other pink tide leaders in Latin America in general and South America in particular. Prior to taking office in 2011, he toured several countries in the Americas, where he notably expressed the idea of re-uniting the Peru–Bolivian Confederation. He also visited Brazil, Colombia, the United States, and Venezuela.

=== Controversies ===
In February 2016, amidst the Peruvian presidential race, a report from the Brazilian Federal Police implicated Humala as recipient of bribes from Odebrecht, a Brazilian construction company, in exchange of assigned public works. President Humala rejected the implication and has avoided speaking to the media on the matter.

== Post-presidency (2016–present) ==
=== Arrest ===
During the Peruvian presidential election in February 2016, a report by the Brazilian Federal Police implicated Humala in bribery by Odebrecht for public works contracts. President Humala denied the charge and avoided questions from the media on that matter.

In July 2017, Humala and his wife were arrested and held in pre-trial detention following investigations into his involvement in the Odebrecht scandal. On 26 April 2018, by resolution of the Constitutional Court of Peru, he began his process of freedom. Following this, his wife was placed on house arrest while Humala had to report to court monthly.

In January 2019, Peruvian prosecutors stated that they had enough evidence to charge Humala and his wife with laundering money from both Odebrecht and the government of Venezuela. In May 2019, the Prosecutor's Office requested 20 years in prison for him and 26 years for his wife, Nadine Heredia. The process also reaches several relatives close to the former presidential partner. The case is in prosecution control.

Ollanta Humala was investigated under restricted appearance, allegedly accused of money laundering to the detriment of the State and of illicit association to commit a crime, among others. However, Odebrecht's main projects were carried out under the presidencies of Alberto Fujimori and Alan García. In February 2022, Humala and his wife faced trial for alleged money laundering related to Odebrecht, facing accusations that the two received $3 million during the 2006 and 2011 elections. Both denied their involvement.

On 15 April 2025, Humala and Heredia were convicted and sentenced to 15 years' imprisonment for money laundering over their involvement in the Odebrecht scandal. Heredia and their then-underage son, Samin Mallko Ollanta Humala Heredia, fled to Brazil's capital Brasília after the country granted diplomatic asylum the following day.

=== Release ===
On the Evening of 31 July 2026, Humala was pardoned and was seen with his supporters while riding in a Car, following his release, Humala said that he was a victim of Political prosecution and also said that "He did not receive bribes from Brazil or Venezuela".

== Publications ==
- Ollanta Humala: From Locumba to Presidential Candidate in Peru (2009)
- Ollanta Uniting Peru: the great transformation: Peru of all of us: government plan, 2006–2011 (2006) (Collaborator)

== Awards and decorations ==
- Argentina:
  - Collar of the Order of the Liberator General San Martín (12 November 2012)
- Colombia:
  - Grand Collar of the Order of Boyaca (11 February 2014)
- Panama:
  - Collar of the Order of Manuel Amador Guerrero (28 April 2014)
- Portugal:
  - Grand Collar of the Order of Prince Henry (19 November 2012)
- Qatar:
  - Collar of the Order of the Independence (14 February 2013)
- South Korea:
  - Recipient of the Grand Order of Mugunghwa (2015)
- Spain:
  - Collar of the Order of Isabella the Catholic (7 July 2015)

== Electoral history ==
Year	Office	Type	Party	Main opponent	Party	Votes for Humala				Result	Swing
Year	Office	Type	Party	Main opponent	Party	Total	%	P.	±%	Result	Swing
2006	President of Peru	General	Union for Peru	Alan García	Peruvian Aprista Party	3,758,258	30.61%	1st	N/A	N/A	N/A
2006	President of Peru	General (second round)	Union for Peru	Alan García	Peruvian Aprista Party	6,270,080	47.37%	2nd	N/A	Lost	N/A
2011	President of Peru	General	Peru Wins	Keiko Fujimori	Popular Force	4,643,064	31.72%	1st	N/A	N/A	N/A
2011	President of Peru	General (second round)	Peru Wins	Keiko Fujimori	Popular Force	7,937,704	51.44%	1st	N/A	Won	Gain
2021	President of Peru	General	Peruvian Nationalist Party	Pedro Castillo	Free Peru	230,831	1.60%	13th	N/A	Lost	N/A

== See also ==
- Presidency of Ollanta Humala

== Notes ==
Party political offices
New office	Leader of the Nationalist Party; 2005–present	Incumbent
New political party	Nationalist nominee for President of Peru; 2006, 2011	Succeeded by Daniel Urresti
New alliance	Peru Wins nominee for President of Peru; 2011	Alliance dissolved
Preceded by Daniel Urresti	Nationalist nominee for President of Peru; 2021	Most recent
Political offices
Preceded by Alan García	President of Peru; 2011–2016	Succeeded by Pedro Pablo Kuczynski
Diplomatic posts
Preceded by Fernando Lugo	President pro tempore of the Union of South American Nations; 2012–2013	Succeeded by Dési Bouterse
Preceded by Enrique Peña Nieto	President pro tempore of the Pacific Alliance; 2015–2016	Succeeded by Michelle Bachelet
