= La Resistencia (Peru) =

Anti-communist group founded in 2018 in Lima, Peru

La Resistencia Dios, Patria y Familia
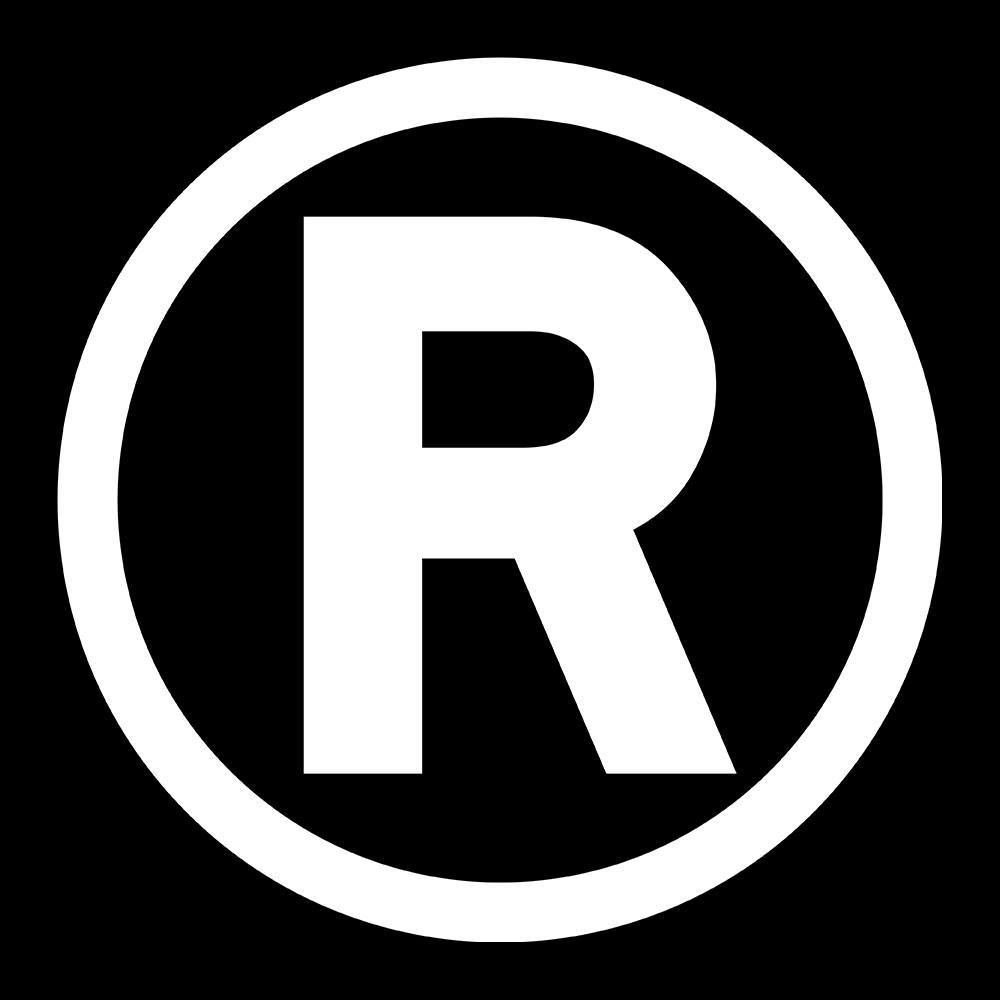
- Founder: Juan José Muñico
- Founded: December 2018
- Country: Peru
- Groups: Los Combatientes; Los Insurgentes
- Headquarters: Lima
- Ideology: Fujimorism; Conservatism (Peruvian); Anti-communism; Right-wing populism Factions: Neo-fascism (disputed)
- Political position: Right-wing
- Status: Active
- Part of: Frente Popular Democrático
- Website: laresistenciaperu.org

La Resistencia Dios, Patria y Familia (English: The Resistance God, Homeland and Family), commonly known as La Resistencia, is a far-right collective that promotes Fujimorism in Peru. Its leader, Juan José Muñico advocates for a far-right government in Peru. The group has engaged in protests and have been described as a shock troop force.

== History ==
=== Founding ===
Ultraconservative groups began to emerge in Peru around 2017 when proposals to introduce gender studies to education curricula occurred. La Resistencia was founded in 2018 by Juan José Muñico, a politician of Popular Renewal who had reportedly been involved in the murder of a veteran of the Cenepa War in 1998. The organization began as a platform to support Keiko Fujimori, the daughter of Alberto Fujimori and leader of Popular Force. Fujimori at the time served as the head of the Congress of Peru during the administration of Pedro Pablo Kuczynski, attracting La Resistencia since she held much of the political power in Peru. Members of the group were seen associating themselves with Popular Force politician Rosa Bartra, with Batra later saying that she was a member of the group.

=== 2019–2020: Constitutional crisis and protests ===
Following the dissolution of the Congress of Peru by President Martín Vizcarra during the 2019 Peruvian constitutional crisis, La Resistencia's support would decline slightly towards Keiko Fujimori, with the group instead beginning to support far-right politician Rafael López Aliaga and the National Solidarity party, which would later be restructured as Popular Renewal.

In the 2020 Peruvian parliamentary election, Muñico and Rosa Batra both ran unsuccessfully for a seat in Congress on the National Solidarity ticket. During the 2020 Peruvian protests, La Resistencia acted against protesters, destroying a makeshift memorial dedicated to two demonstrators killed.

=== 2021 Peruvian general election ===
During the 2021 Peruvian general election, Muñico threatened multiple groups that he alleged supported presidential candidate Pedro Castillo according to La República, stating "We are already pointing towards all those politicians, vacant presidents, opinionologists, NGOs, influencers, etc. who, knowing the danger of the country and our children are supporting the communist candidate. When the danger passes, we will remember it in their own homes..." After Castillo was elected, La Resistencia said that the voting was fraudulent and supported Keiko Fujimori's claims. On 2 July 2021, Sagasti would refuse to audit the second round of elections; Fujimori would accuse Sagasti of abandoning his "great responsibility to ensure fair elections." Days later on 14 July 2021, hundreds of members of La Resistencia members attempted to storm the Government Palace in a similar manner to the January 6 United States Capitol attack, surrounding the vehicles of ministers of Óscar Ugarte and Solangel Fernández and attacking journalists, though La Resistencia was successfully repelled by authorities. Fujimori would admit her defeat on 19 July 2021, though she would continue saying that "votes were stolen" from her. By October 2021, Fujimori began to distance herself from the group.

=== Presidency of Pedro Castillo ===
During the presidency of Pedro Castillo, the group called for his ousting, with La Resistencia leader Juan José Muñico stating:

"What Peru needs is an extreme right-wing government. In the Government we live in now, ... have taken over the Judiciary, the Prosecutor's Office, the Constitutional Court, the National Elections Jury. What we need is a strong government, which is not willing to give in anywhere. ... If our destiny is prison, then we will continue to do our activities in the streets"

After Castillo called for the Organization of American States to intervene in November 2022 following numerous attempts to remove him from office, members of La Resistencia protested against the delegation of the OAS High Level Group in San Isidro and were dispersed by police following attacks.

=== Protests against Dina Boluarte ===
While widespread protests against President Dina Boluarte occurred, La Resistencia members gathered outside of the headquarters of IDL-Reporteros, the home of its chief journalist Gustavo Gorriti and the home of journalist Rosa María Palacios of La República. Nearby members of the Peruvian National Police watched on as members of La Resistencia attacked the IDL headquarters by throwing objects and explosives at the building while also issuing antisemitic statements and death threats towards Gorriti. The Committee to Protect Journalists condemned the actions of La Resistencia for its actions of intimidating journalists.

== Organization and doctrine ==
La Resistencia is Fujimorist organization that identifies with anti-communism and far-right politics. The Times of Israel accused said group as antisemitic after attacks towards Peruvian-Jewish journalist Gustavo Gorriti outside of his home. Its members include current and retired military officers of the Peruvian Armed Forces who have been described as violent shock troops of the far-right in Peru.

The group spread anti-lockdown and anti-vaccine sentiments during the COVID-19 pandemic in Peru while also promoting anti-LGBT violence and violence against women. Members have been seen using fascist symbolism, wearing black uniforms, using the swastika, waving the Cross of Burgundy and gesturing the fascist salute at events. The organization also has two sub-groups; Los Combatientes (The Combatants) and Los Insurgentes (The Insurgents). These two branches have been observed on social media disseminating disinformation, fake news and fascist imagery, according to Público. The leader of Los Combatientes, Roger Ayachi, has been observed making violent speeches according to La Tercera.

=== Anti-communism ===
The ideology and rhetoric of La Resistencia are fundamentally characterized by a strong opposition to communism, ideology which the organization views as "anti-patriotic" and an "anti-constitutional" threat that seeks to dismantle Peruvian democratic institutions and hand the country over the São Paulo Forum, which the organization describes as "communist". According to journalist Joseph Zarate, La Resistencia is the most organized and violent anti-communist group in Lima, which manifests its posture through marches and protests. Juan José Múñico, founder of La Resistencia and a self-described ‘far-right anti-communist’ activist, has called for the 'extermination of communists' and to rise up in rebellion against the government of Pedro Castillo, in October 2021.

The anti-communist posture of La Resistencia was reinforced during the presidency of Castillo in 2021, when the organization coordinated protests in order to depose him from office, alleging fraud during the presidential elections in June and accusing his administration as "usurper" and "terrorist". According to sociologist Carmen Rosa Balbi, the triumph of Castillo in the 2021 elections is seen by members of La Resistencia as a revival of Marxism-Leninism and Mariateguismo in the Peruvian political scene.

=== Fascism ===
The organization has been described independently as neofascist by some observers, including La República, IDL-Reporteros and the New Left Review, with sociologist Carmen Rosa Balbi describing that such radicalization had not been observed in Peru since the 1930s. Because of its strong anti-communist stance, La Resistencia members have been described as "fascists" and holding a "McCarthyist" posture. Historian Tirso Molinari said that while the group holds anti-immigration, anti-leftist, neo-fascist and right-wing populist traits, it aligns more with McCarthyism due to its lack of structure.

Juan José Muñico, leader of the organization, asserts that the organization's doctrinal framework isn't inspired on fascism. However, some of its members have emulated the Roman salute in its public appearances.
