= Rafael López Aliaga =

Peruvian businessman and politician (born 1961)

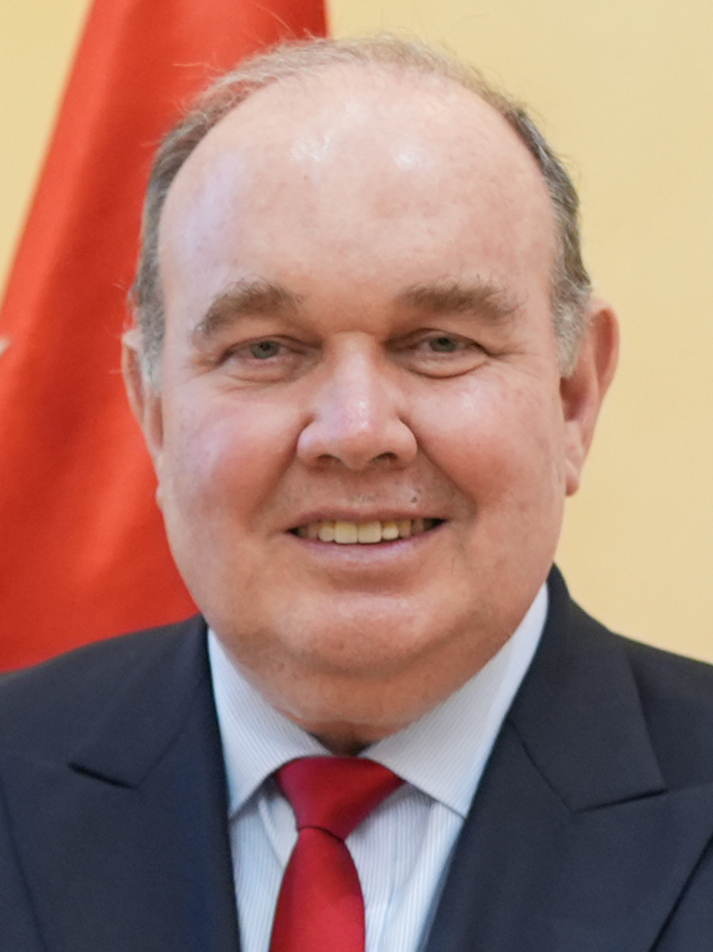
- López Aliaga in 2024

President of Popular Renewal
- Incumbent
- Assumed office 29 August 2020
- Preceded by: Luis Castañeda Lossio (as President of National Solidarity)

Mayor of Lima
- In office 1 January 2023 – 13 October 2025
- Lieutenant: Renzo Reggiardo
- Preceded by: Miguel Romero Sotelo
- Succeeded by: Renzo Reggiardo

Lima Metropolitan Councillor
- In office 1 January 2007 – 31 December 2010

Personal details
- Born: Rafael Bernardo López Aliaga Cazorla; 11 February 1961 (age 65) Lima, Peru
- Party: Popular Renewal (since 2020)
- Other political affiliations: National Solidarity (2009–2020)
- Education: Pedro Ruiz Gallo National University; University of Piura (BS); University of the Pacific (MBA)
- Nickname: Porky

Rafael Bernardo López-Aliaga Cazorla (born 11 February 1961) is a Peruvian businessman, industrial engineer and politician who served as mayor of Lima from 2023 to 2025. He is currently the leader of the far-right Popular Renewal party, the successor to National Solidarity in 2020, and the party's candidate in the 2026 Peruvian presidential election.

Entering politics late in his career, López Aliaga was elected to Lima's Metropolitan Council, serving under mayor Luis Castañeda Lossio's second term. Following a failed run for the Peruvian Congress in 2011, he remained a member of National Solidarity but stayed in the private sector. It was not until 2019 when he assumed the leadership of his party as General Secretary following Castañeda's pretrial detention for a corruption trial.

At the 2020 parliamentary election, López Aliaga gained political attention as he started shifting his party further to the right. Eventually, National Solidarity failed to attain congressional representation in the election. Announcing a presidential bid, he was elected president of his party to lead a reconstruction process, effectively refounding the party as Popular Renewal. López Aliaga ran for President of Peru at the 2021 general election. Fighting for the right-wing vote alongside Keiko Fujimori and Hernando de Soto, he eventually placed third with 11.75% of the popular vote.

Following the election of Pedro Castillo as president, López Aliaga has been considered as one of the most visible leaders of the Peruvian right. He ran successfully for the mayorship of Lima in 2022, narrowly winning with 26.32% of the vote.

As a businessman, López Aliaga is the co-founder (along with Lorenzo Sousa) and a shareholder of Peruval Corp SA, parent company of Ferrocarril Transandino SA and Peru Rail SA, both train companies with operations in Cusco, Arequipa and Puno.

== Early life and education ==
López Aliaga was born in Lima on 11 February 1961, but was raised in Chiclayo, Lambayeque Region. His father, Fernando López Aliaga, worked in the city's Hacienda Pomalca while his mother, Paula Cazorla, was from the Cajamarca Region. Both of his parents were chemical engineers, graduates of the National University of San Marcos in Lima.

Upon graduating from San Agustín School of Chiclayo located in Pimentel district, López Aliaga was admitted to the Pedro Ruiz Gallo National University in Lambayeque city to study civil engineering, ranking first in the entrance examination. He subsequently dropped out due to the political unrest of the 1980s. Relocating in Piura, he was admitted to the University of Piura to study industrial engineering, completing the degree in four years and graduating first in his class. He obtained a bachelor's degree in 1983. Later, he obtained a master's degree in Business Administration (MBA) at the University of the Pacífic, and completed the Senior Management Program (PAD) at the University of Piura.

López Aliaga pursued a career in banking, serving at first in Banco Wiese, and as Corporate and Development Banking Manager at Citibank. Subsequently, he founded Peruvian Corp, a securities enterprise, and Grupo Acres, a hotel and railway finance company. Since 1999, he has been a co shareholder along with Lorenzo Sousa of PeruRail as well as Belmond's hotels and Trasandino Railway in Peru.

== Political career ==
Entering politics through the Lima City Council in 2007, López Aliaga maintained a low profile until 2019, when he was elected to the general secretaryship of National Solidarity in September 2019. Following the dissolution of the Peruvian Congress, his party was set to run at the 2020 parliamentary election. Initially a moderate conservative, López Aliaga adopted a conservative platform. He also ran for a seat in Congress in 2011 under the National Solidarity Alliance, but he was unsuccessful.

=== 2021 Peruvian presidential election ===
During the 2020 campaign, López Aliaga announced his intention to run for President of Peru at the 2021 general election, stating in a televised interview that he considered himself to be "the Peruvian Bolsonaro".

Following his party's poor results at the 2020 parliamentary election, he announced an organizational re-foundation. In October 2020, López Aliaga officially founded Popular Renewal, effectively dissolving National Solidarity by changing the registered organization's name and platform. Assuming the position of party president, he stated that the party is "re-founded with principles of solidarity and anchored in God, Christ." He campaigns on a neoliberal platform on economic issues and a conservative one on societal issues. A member of Opus Dei, he is sometimes described as a religious fundamentalist. He calls for a ban on sex education in colleges, which he sees as a form of "cultural Marxism" promoting homosexuality, a ban on abortion, including in cases of rape or danger to the life of the mother, and a ban on gay marriage.

As part of his campaign, he stated the voting in 2021 would be "the last free election in Peru" and "if we don't go well, this will be Venezuela or Cuba, remember me". He also blamed presidents Martín Vizcarra and Francisco Sagasti for Peru's economic issues, describing the Vizcarra administration as a "communist style of the government" and called Sagasti a "clown". He proposed further deregulation of Peru and the elimination of half of its ministries. According to The Guardian, human rights groups were "alarmed by his use of conspiracy theories, disinformation and hate speech against opponents and journalists".

In an interview conducted on January 19, 2021 on the ATV channel, he generated controversy with the metaphorical opinion he provided regarding his stance against abortion in rape cases. The words he mentioned were: "I am a hotelier. I have five-star hotels, for me to give a 5-star hotel as a home for a girl is to give her the most affection I can."

On February 19, 2021, the Special Electoral Jury (JEE) initiated a sanctioning process against the candidacy of Rafael López Aliaga for violating electoral propaganda regulations. This measure was approved because the applicant said that upon reaching the presidency "he will donate his salary to charitable organizations". He was temporarily disqualified from the presidential election on 25 February 2021 for alleged vote-buying based on his statement that if he was elected President, he will donate his salary to charity. Hernando de Soto, his political rival in the 2021 elections, appeared at the demonstration outside the JNE, where López Aliaga was, whom he praised.

On March 12, 2021, he presented his technical team, which included former ministers Alfonso Miranda Eyzaguirre, Carlos Herrera Descalzi, Alfonso Velásquez Tuesta, former Vice Minister Eduardo Ponce Vivanco, former Vice President of the Republic, Máximo San Román, the former parliamentarian Fabiola Morales, the former president of the Judiciary Javier Villa Stein, the former director general of the Police José Tisoc Lindley, among others.

=== 2022 Lima mayoral election ===
In the aftermath of the first round of the 2021 general election, López Aliaga confirmed his bid for mayor of Lima in the upcoming 2022 mayoral election.

Leading the polls early into the election, López Aliaga trailed behind former congressman and Interior minister, Daniel Urresti, who ran for a second time for the mayorship following his defeat to Jorge Muñoz at the 2018 Lima municipal election.

As part of his campaign, López Aliaga promised to fight crime with support of the reservists group of the Peruvian Armed Forces, in addition to calling for a radical reform of the capital's transportation system. His campaign was managed by former right-wing congressmen Julio Gagó and Renzo Reggiardo, with the latter running for lieutenant mayor.

At the election, Popular Renewal placed first by receiving 26.35% of the popular vote, claiming victory for López Aliaga, in addition winning twelve districts of the capital. In contrast to previous municipal elections, no winning candidate for mayor of Lima since 1963 had been elected by less than 30% of the vote, making him the least voted winner in the history of the capital.

In April 2023, an Ipsos poll showed that 49% of respondents disapproved of López Aliaga, compared to a 40% approval rate.

=== 2026 Peruvian presidential election ===
In October 2025, López Aliaga resigned as mayor of Lima to campaign in the Peruvian general election scheduled for 12 April 2026. He was considered an early frontrunner in the presidential race.

The first round presidential election resulted in Keiko Fujimori and Roberto Sánchez Palomino will be going to the second round. Despite losing the presidential election, López-Aliaga was elected to the Senate for the nationwide constituency.

Following the first round, official results confirmed that neither López Aliaga nor other major candidates advanced to the runoff, which was contested between Keiko Fujimori and Roberto Sánchez Palomino. López Aliaga finished in third place nationally with 11.91% of the vote, as reflected in the final tally published by Peru’s electoral authorities.

With his elimination from the presidential race, López Aliaga did not proceed to the second round campaign and instead transitioned toward his elected position in the Senate for the nationwide constituency, scheduled to assume office in July 2026, as part of the broader congressional transition following the general election cycle.

== Ideology and views ==
Observers have placed him as right-wing to far-right, and ideologically conservative. Rafael López Aliaga, a member of Opus Dei, regards himself as a "social Christian", saying that he maintains celibacy through daily self-flagellation with a chain cilice and thinking of the Virgin Mary. He opposes same-sex marriage, the use of contraceptives, the legalization of marijuana and abortion. In Peru, he is commonly known under the nickname "Porky", referring to the Porky Pig Show. López Aliaga adopted his nickname for his campaign, so he occasionally costumed himself as a pig to protest against the omnipresent corruption in the country.

López Aliaga signed the Madrid Charter, a document drafted by the Spanish party Vox that describes left-wing groups as enemies of Ibero-America involved in a "criminal project" that are "under the umbrella of the Cuban regime". He signed the document along with other right-wing politicians such as Javier Milei of Argentina, José Antonio Kast of Chile and Eduardo Bolsonaro of Brazil, the son of President Jair Bolsonaro.

Regarding crime, López Aliaga applauded Nayib Bukele during the Salvadoran gang crackdown, calling on the Ministry of Defense to allow the Peruvian Armed Forces to patrol the streets of Lima, including with tanks.

On the COVID-19 pandemic, he opposed travel restrictions and the use of masks. He generally did not use masks in his public appearances, although he explains that he sometimes did wear them "so that the press does not criticise [him]." He advocated that the vaccination campaign should be left to the private sector and that individuals should pay for access to vaccination. According to Vice, López Aliaga disseminated misinformation about COVID-19 vaccines in Peru, accusing President Sagasti of committing "genocide" for purchasing what he called ineffective vaccines. A month before elections, López Aliaga called for the removal of President Sagasti from office, raising concerns among presidential candidates that he was promoting a coup against the president.

On economic issues, he wants to favour private investment and limit the presence of the state. He proposed to abolish social programmes such as food distribution in poor schools, believing that social assistance should be handled by private associations and not by the public authorities.

== Investigations ==
According to Peruvian media, López Aliaga has been allegedly involved in controversies surrounding his finances. He was investigated by the Congress of Peru in 2001 regarding allegations of tax evasion. The Panama Papers scandal in 2017 mentioned López Aliaga as allegedly being involved with money laundering. During the campaign his businesses were accused of having a large debt with the SUNAT and of not paying personal debts to the state.

On 18 July 2021, the Public Ministry of Peru opened an investigation into Willax journalists Phillip Butters, Humberto Ortiz and Enrique Luna Victoria, alleging that they were responsible for acts of sedition and inciting civil unrest. Prosecutor Juana Meza wrote that Willax disseminated "news with a conspiratorial connotation, inciting the electoral results to be unknown, trying to weaken the electoral institutions and even calling for a coup d'état" and was used as a platform "to send messages of hatred and incitement to kill". Rafael López Aliaga was also named in the investigation. López Aliaga reportedly called for death in two separate incidents; in May 2021 he chanted "Death to communism! Death to Cerrón! Death to Castillo!" to supporters and at the Respect My Vote rally that was organized by Willax TV owner Erasmo Wong Lu on 26 June 2021, where the politician stated "Death to communism, get out of here, filthy communists, you have awakened the lion, to the streets!"

== Electoral history ==
Year	Office	Type	Party	Main opponent	Party	Votes for López Aliaga				Result	Swing
Year	Office	Type	Party	Main opponent	Party	Total	%	P.	±%	Result	Swing
2006	Lima Metropolitan Councilman	Municipal	National Unity Electoral Alliance	Miguel Neumann Valenzuela	National Restoration	1,960,588 (List)	47.82%	1st	N/A	Won	Gain
2011	Congressman from Lima	General	National Solidarity	Martha Hildebrandt	Popular Force	11,877	11.46%	5th	N/A	Lost	N/A
2021	President of Peru	General	Popular Renewal	Pedro Castillo	Free Peru	1,692,279	11.75%	3rd	N/A	Lost	N/A
2022	Mayor of Lima	Municipal	Popular Renewal	Daniel Urresti	Podemos Perú	1,377,551 (List)	26.33%	1st	N/A	Won	Gain
2026	President of Peru	General	Popular Renewal	Roberto Sánchez	Together for Peru	1,993,905	11.91%	3rd	0.16	Lost	Percentage gains
