= Isaac Mekler =

Peruvian politician

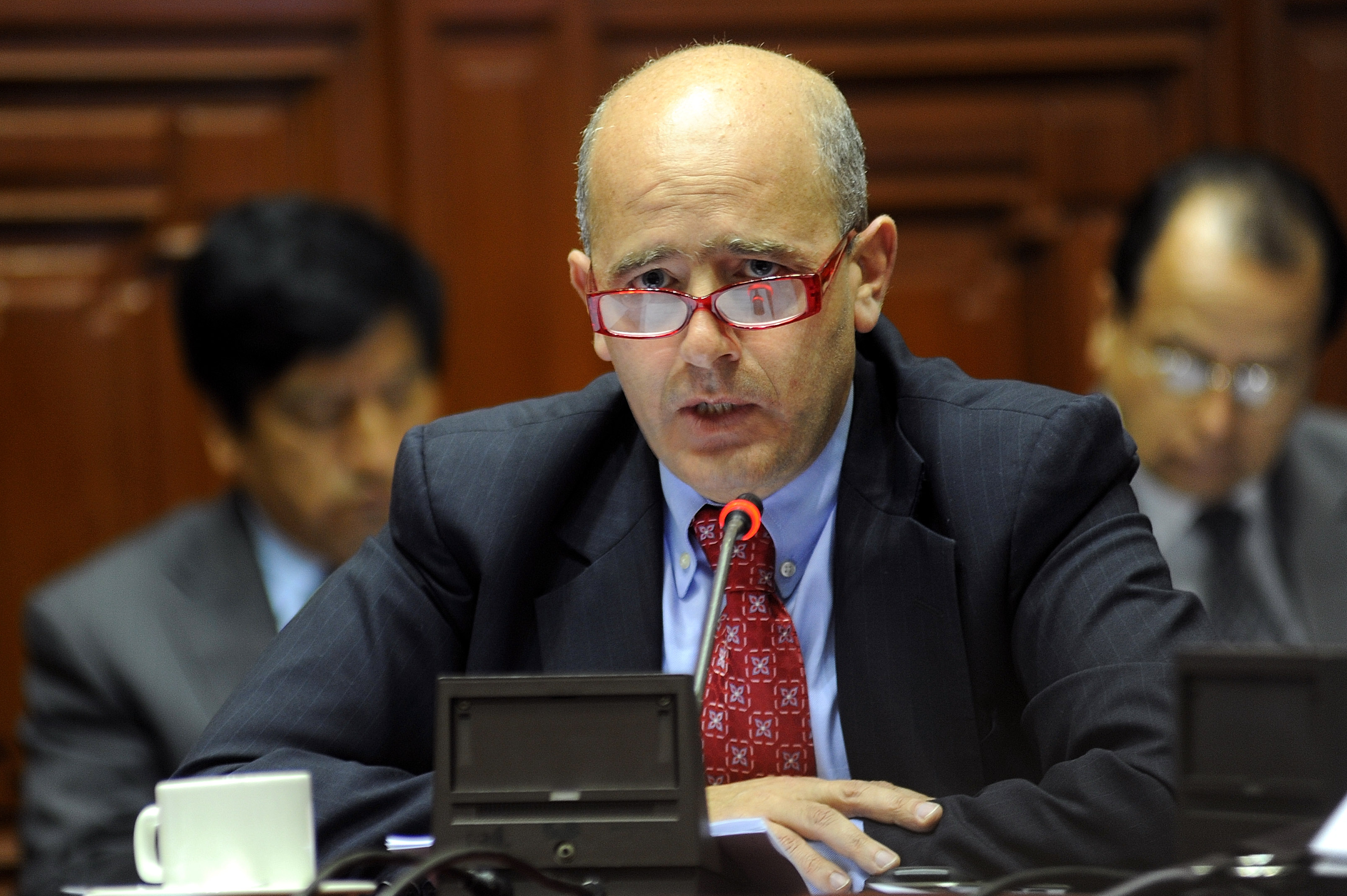
- Isaac Mekler

Member of Congress
- In office 26 July 2006 – 26 July 2011
- Constituency: Callao

Personal details
- Born: Isaac Mekler Neiman; 9 July 1959 (age 67) Lima, Peru
- Party: Alliance for Progress (2016-present); National Solidarity Party (2009-2013); Peruvian Nationalist Party (2005-2009)
- Other political affiliations: Alliance for the Progress of Peru (2016); National Solidarity Alliance (2010-2011); Union for Peru (2006)
- Education: Pontifical Catholic University of Peru
- Occupation: Politician

Isaac Mekler Neiman (born 9 July 1959) is a Peruvian politician and a former Congressman representing the Constitutional Province of Callao for the 2006–2011 term. Originally from the Peruvian Nationalist Party, Mekler switched to the National Solidarity Party of Luis Castañeda in 2009. In the 2011 elections, he lost his seat he ran for re-election under the National Solidarity Alliance of former Lima Mayor Luis Castañeda but he was not re-elected.

He was the leader of the Association of Jews in Peru as of December 2005.

== Education ==
He studied at the León Pinelo School in the city of Lima. He later studied the Pontifical Catholic University of Peru, where he studied law.

== Political career ==
=== Congressman ===
Mekler was affiliated with the Peruvian Nationalist Party of Ollanta Humala. In the 2006 elections, he won a seat, representing Callao and served for the 2006–2011 term. In 2009, he switched to the National Solidarity Party of Luis Castañeda. In the 2011 elections, he lost his seat he ran for re-election under the National Solidarity Alliance of former Lima Mayor Luis Castañeda but he was not re-elected.

=== Post-congressional term ===
In the 2016 election, he ran for a seat again in Congress, this time switching to the constituency of Lima under the Alliance for the Progress of Peru of former Governor of La Libertad Cesar Acuña Peralta which grouped the Alliance for Progress, National Restoration and We Are Peru, but was once again, he was unsuccessful.
