= Gustavo Rondón =

Peruvian politician

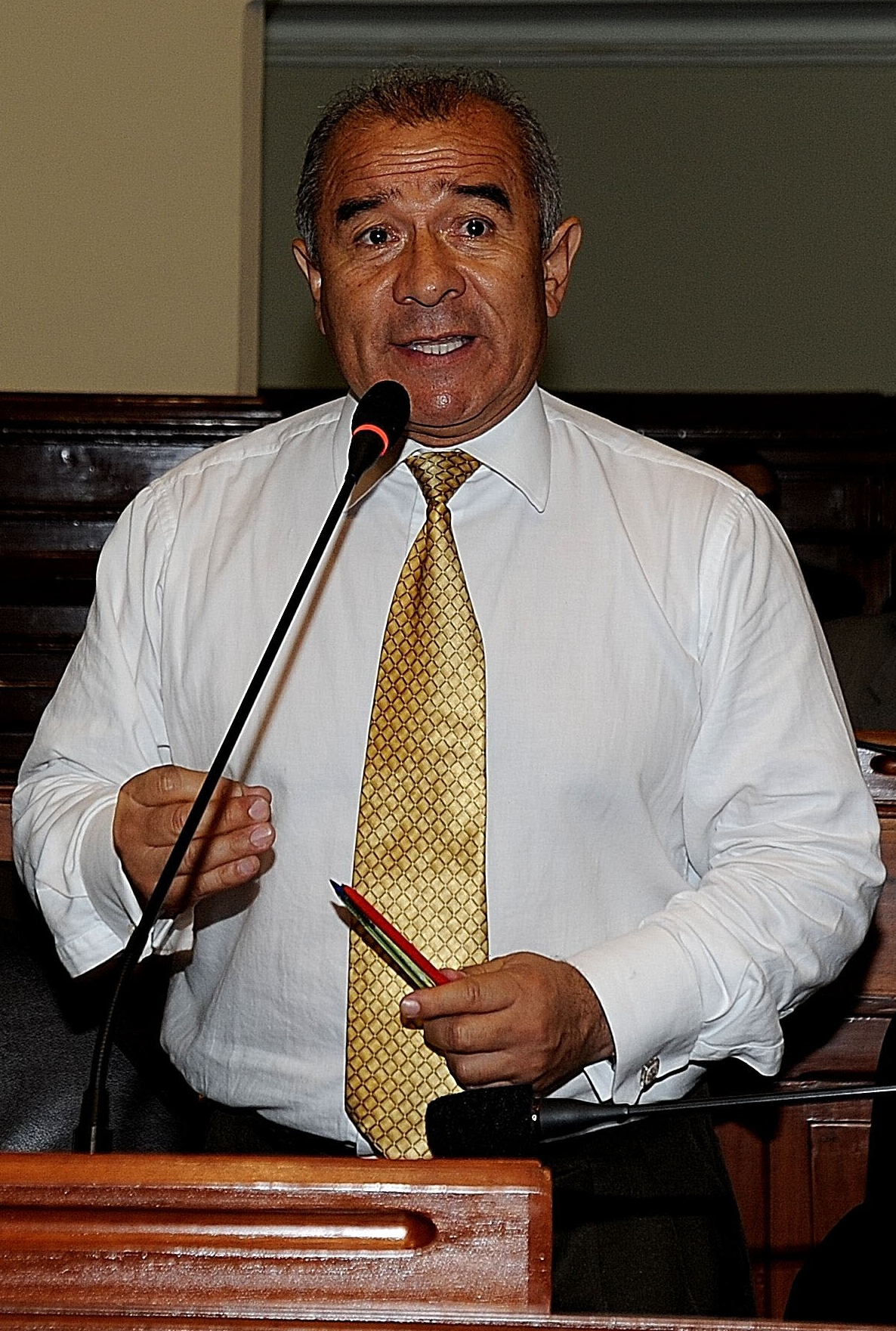

Member of Congress
- In office 26 July 2011 – 26 July 2016
- Constituency: Arequipa

Personal details
- Born: Gustavo Bernardo Rondón Fudinaga; 11 March 1958 (age 68) Arequipa, Arequipa, Peru
- Party: National Solidarity
- Other political affiliations: Alliance for the Future (2006); Vamos Vecino (1998)
- Education: National University of San Marcos
- Occupation: Politician
- Profession: Lawyer, businessman

Gustavo Bernardo Rondón Fudinaga (born in Arequipa on 11 March 1958) is a Peruvian politician. He was a Congressman of the Republic for the period 2011-2016 for the Arequipa region.

== Biography ==
He was born in Arequipa on 11 March 1958.

In 1987, he graduated as a medical surgeon from the National University of San Agustín de Arequipa. He has completed postgraduate studies at the same university and in health services management at the Universidad Nacional Mayor de San Marcos.

Among other positions he has held in the public health system, he has been general director of the General Health Directorate of Arequipa (1994-1999) and Director of Comprehensive Health Care of the Regional Health Management of Arequipa (1992-2011).

In recent years he has also been president of Aprociencia and advisor to the Roundtable.

== Political career ==
In the municipal elections of 1998, he ran for the Arequipa provincial mayor's office for Vamos Vecino, however he was not elected. He tried his candidacy again in the municipal elections of 2002 for Primero Perú and in the municipal elections of 2006 for Fuerza Democrática, in both cases without success.

In the general elections of 2006, he was a candidate for the Congress of the Republic by Alliance for the Future, not being elected.

He also ran for the regional Presidency of Arequipa in the 2010 regional elections for the Arequipa Renace regional movement, without succeeding again.

In the 2011 general elections, he was elected Congressman representing Arequipa by the National Solidarity Alliance, with 58,984 preferential votes, for the 2011-2016 parliamentary term.

During his parliamentary work, Rondón was elected by the Board of Spokespersons as President of the Audit and Comptroller Commission for the period (2012-2013). Being the most coveted commission, it had to face the summons of former president Alejandro Toledo to its commission.

He left office on 8 August 2013, passing the presidency of the commission to Virgilio Acuña.

In 2016, Rondon was part of Hernando Guerra García’s presidential ticket under the National Solidarity-UPP alliance to run in the general elections in Peru of the same year. However, after a few months the ticket withdrew from the electoral campaign.
