= 2000 Peruvian general election =

Highly controversial and fraudulent election

- Presidential election
- 9 April 2000 (first round); 28 May 2000 (second round)
- Turnout: 82.83% (first round) ▲8.98pp 81.00% (second round) ▲1.48pp
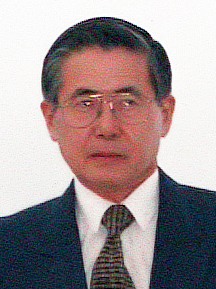

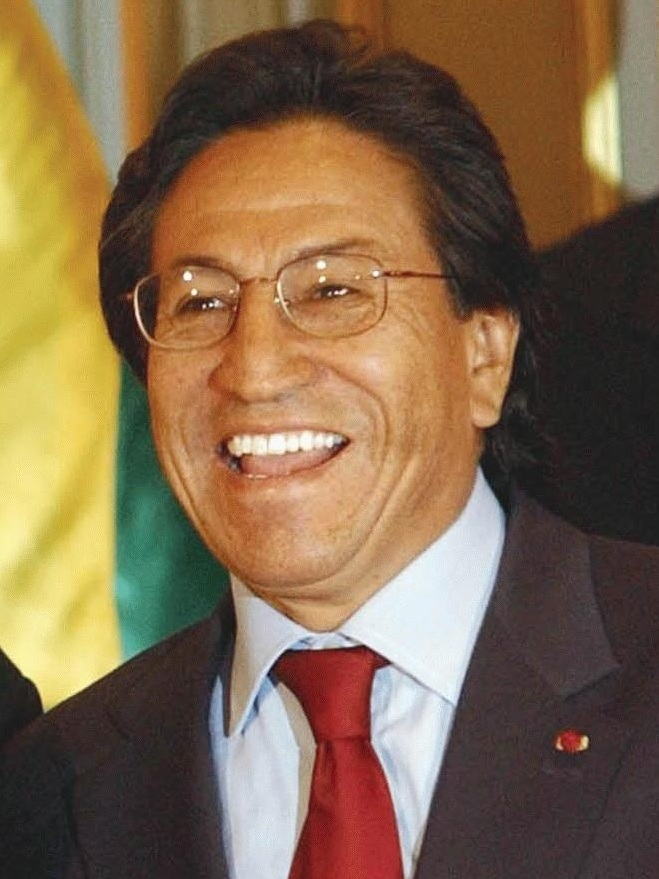
Nominee	Alberto Fujimori	Alejandro Toledo
Party	Peru 2000	Possible Peru
Running mate	Francisco Tudela; Ricardo Márquez	Carlos Ferrero Costa; David Waisman
Popular vote	6,041,685	2,086,215
Percentage	74.33%	25.67%
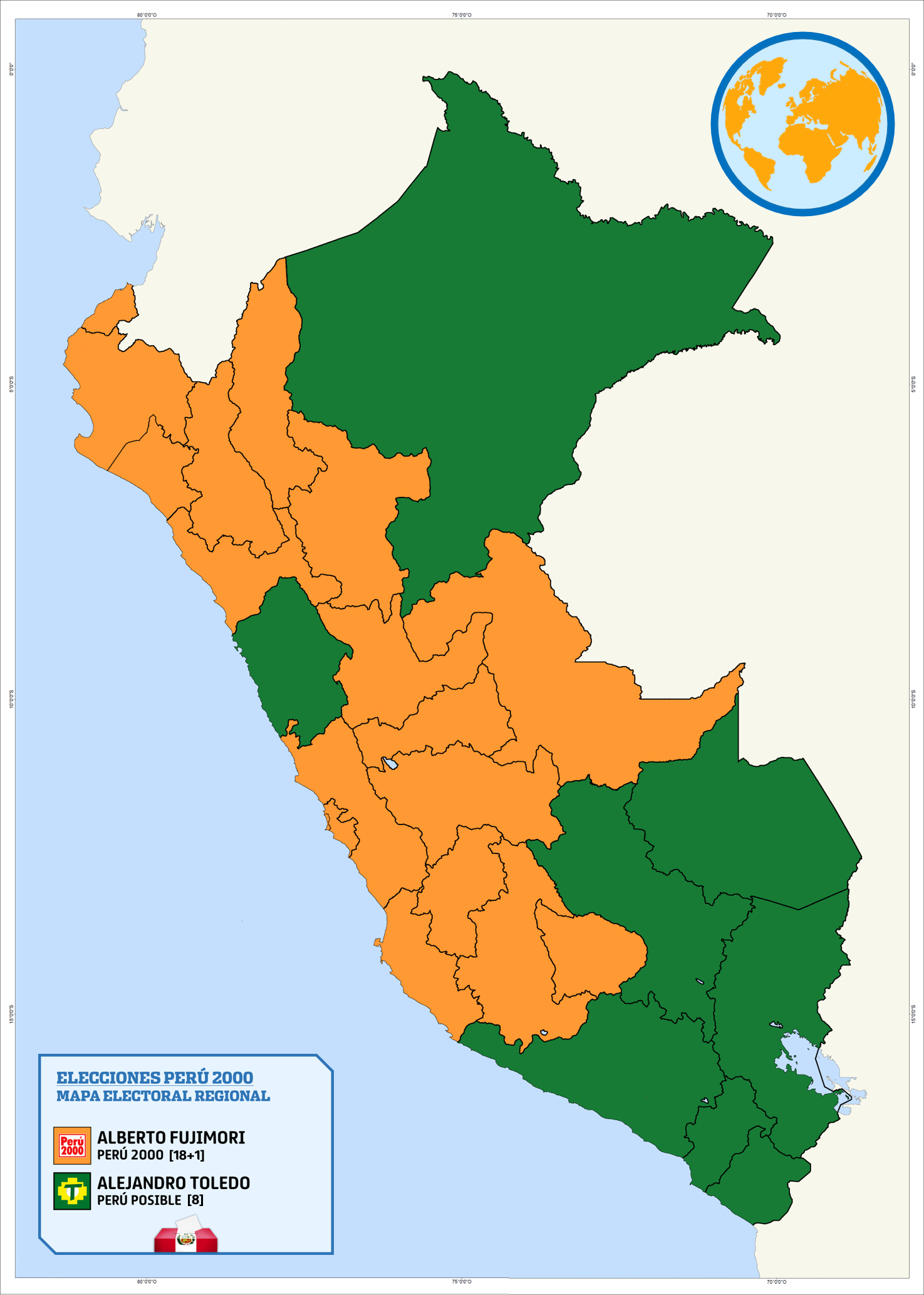
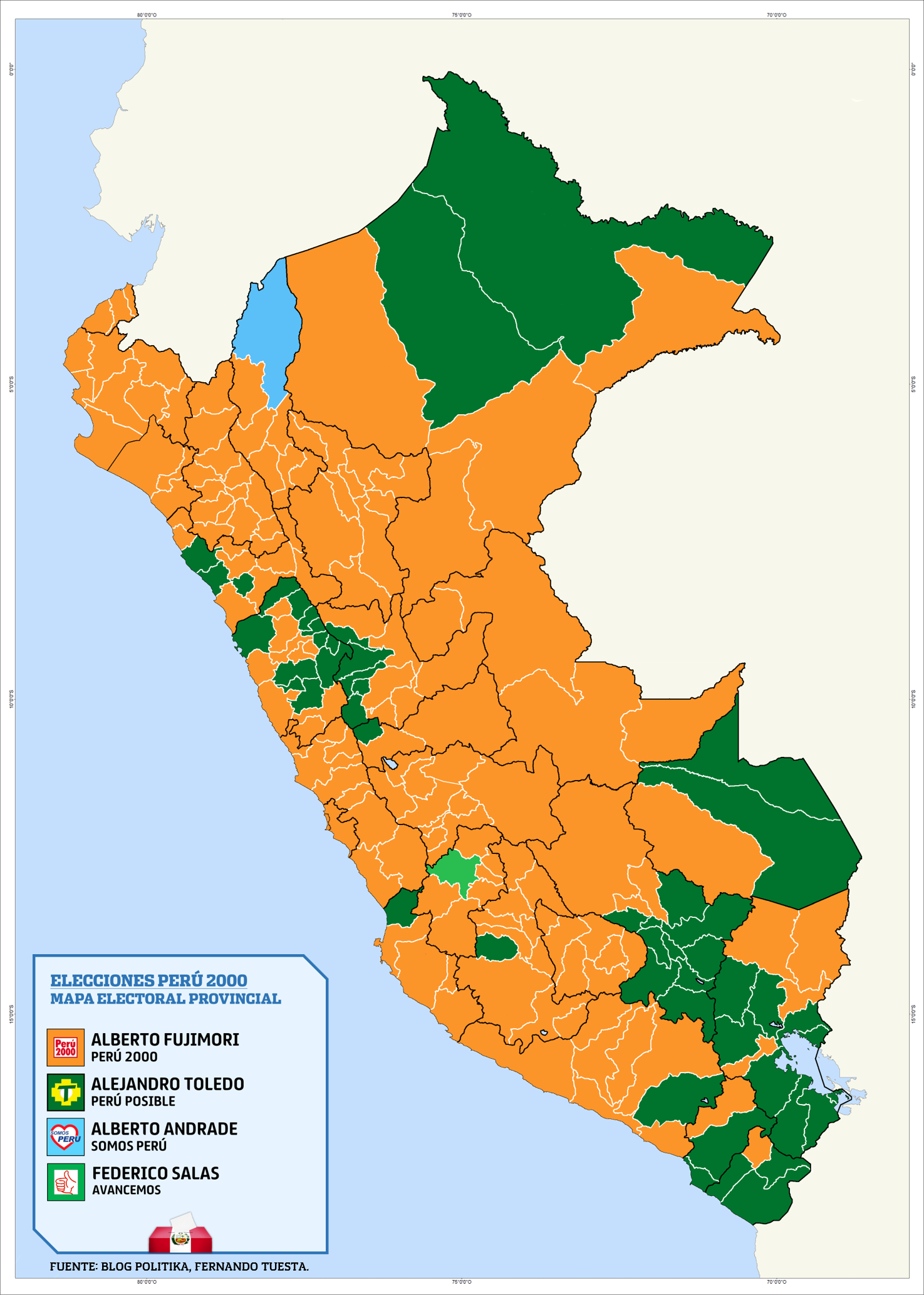
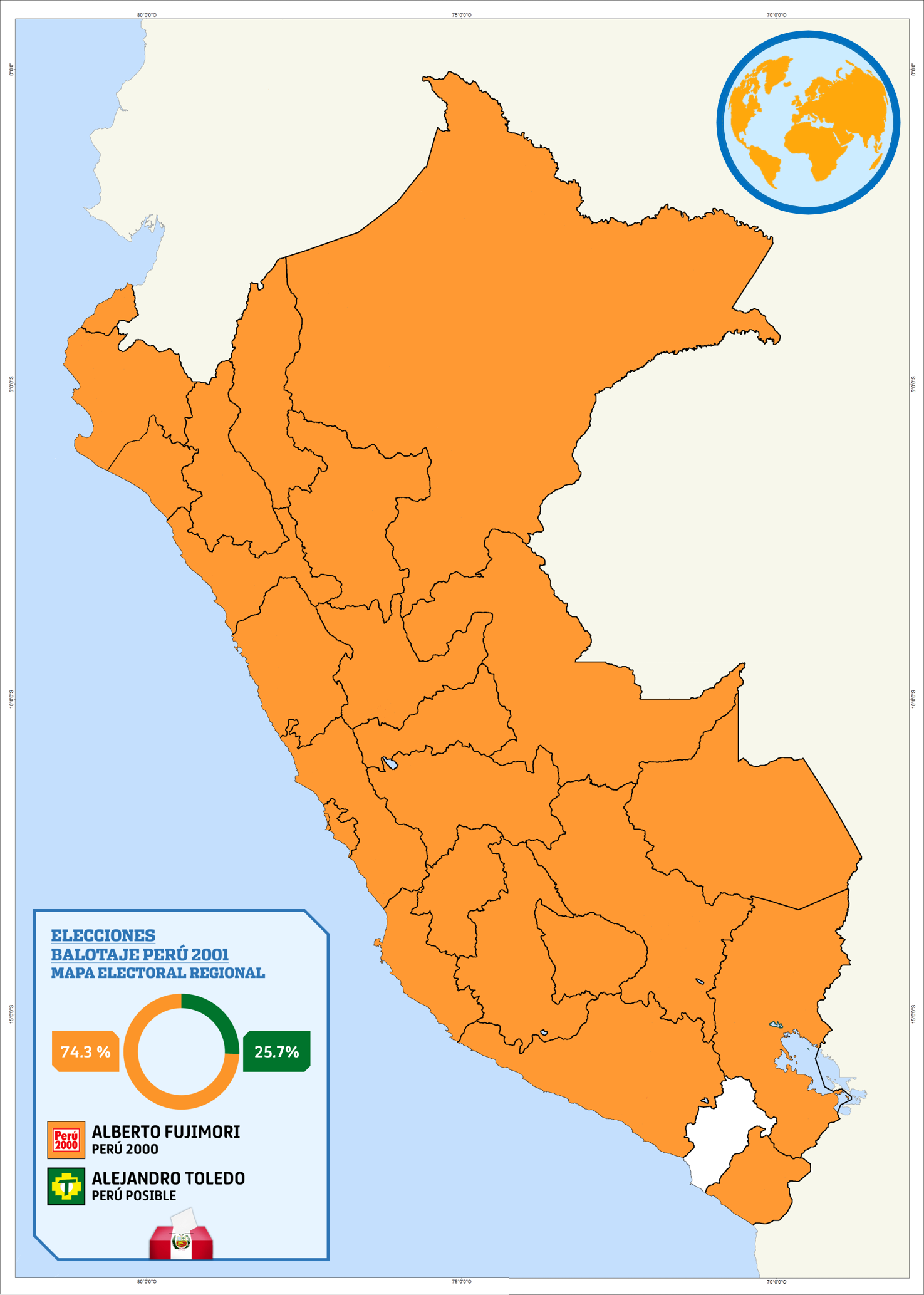
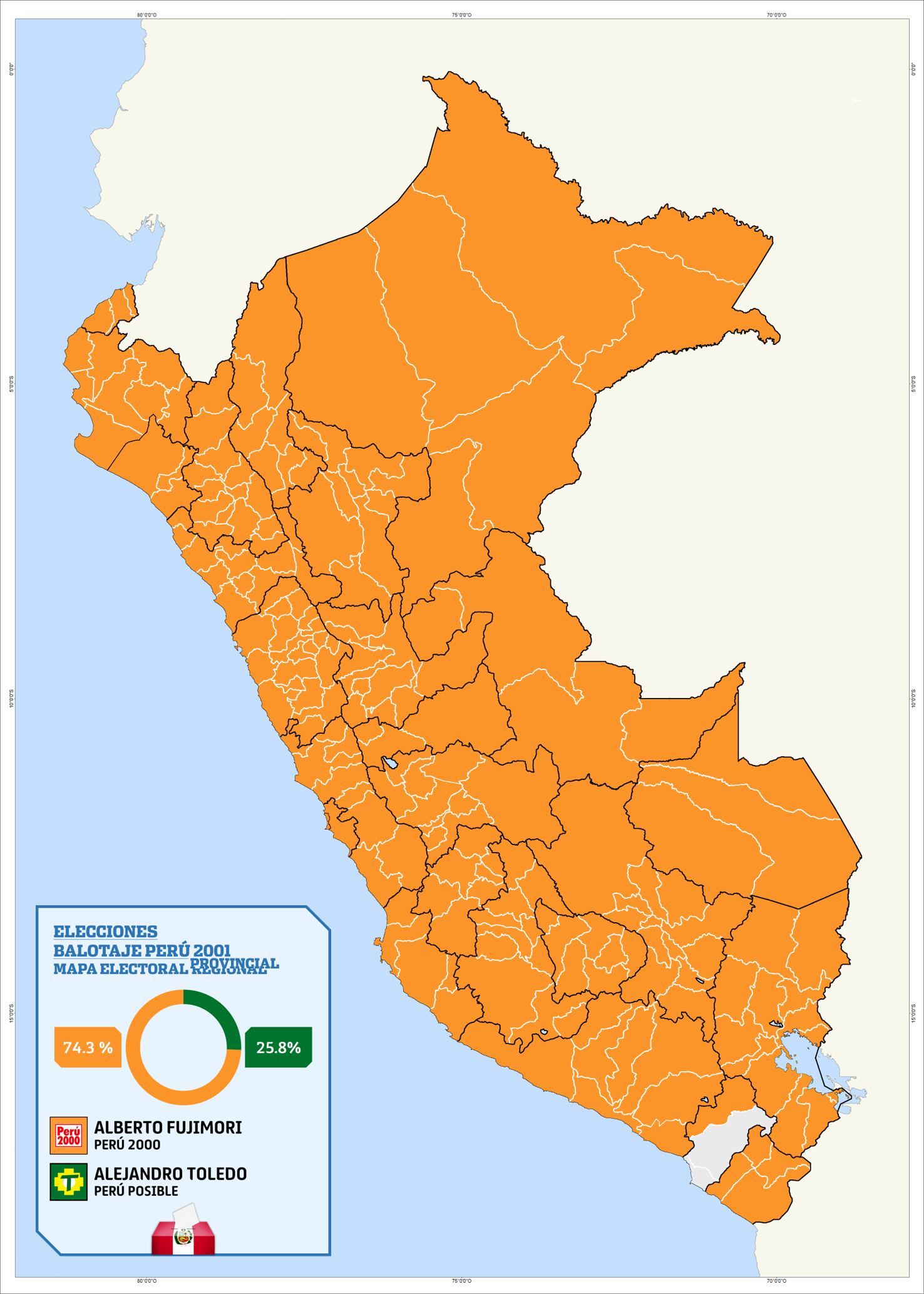
President before election
Alberto Fujimori
Vamos Vecino
Elected President
Alberto Fujimori
Peru 2000
- Congressional election
- 9 April 2000
- All 120 seats in the Congress of Peru; 61 seats needed for a majority
Party	Leader	Vote %	Seats	+/–
Peru 2000	Alberto Fujimori	42.16	52	−15
Possible Peru	Alejandro Toledo	23.24	29	+24
FIM	Fernando Olivera	7.56	9	+3
We Are Peru	Alberto Andrade	7.20	9	New
APRA	Jorge Del Castillo	5.51	6	−2
National Solidarity	Luis Castañeda	4.03	4	New
Advancing	Federico Salas	3.09	3	0
UPP	Daniel Estrada	2.56	3	−14
Popular Action	Fernando Belaúnde	2.47	3	0
FREPAP	Ezequiel Ataucusi	2.18	2	+1
This lists parties that won seats. See the complete results below.

General elections were held in Peru on 9 April 2000, with a run-off of the presidential election on 28 May. The elections were highly controversial and widely considered to have been fraudulent. Incumbent President Alberto Fujimori was re-elected for a third term with almost three-quarters of the vote. However, the elections were tainted with allegations of unconstitutionality, bribery, structural bias, and outright electoral fraud. Alejandro Toledo boycotted the second round of the presidential election, in which over 30% of ballots were declared invalid. Fujimori subsequently called for new elections after his scandal, fled Peru, and faxed in his resignation from a hotel in Japan.

== Candidates ==
=== Main presidential candidates ===
Alejandro Toledo	Luis Castañeda	Abel Salinas	Alberto Andrade	Alberto Fujimori
	Lima City Councilman (1981-1986)	Member of Senate (1990-1992)	Mayor of Lima (1996-2002)	President of Peru (1990-2000)
Possible Peru	National Solidarity	Peruvian Aprista Party	We Are Peru	Peru 2000

=== Other candidates ===
- Máximo San Román, mechanical engineer, businessman and former First vice president (1990-1992) - Union for Peru.
- Víctor Andrés García Belaúnde, lawyer and former Member of the Chambier of Deputies (1985-1992) - Popular Action.
- Federico Salas, Business administration and formen Mayor of Huancavelica (1996-2000) - Advancing.
- Ezequiel Ataucusi, religious leader (1968-2000) - Agricultural People's Front of Peru.

== Constitutional issues ==
The Constitution of Peru specifically limited presidents to two terms, and Fujimori relied on the legally questionable theory that the restriction did not apply to him in 2000 because the 1993 Constitution was written after he nullified the previous constitution, at which time he was already in power. The electoral bodies, the National Office of Electoral Processes (ONPE) and National Jury of Elections (Peru) (JNE), were staffed at the time with Fujimori supporters who were considered by many to be corrupt. These bodies accepted Fujimori's argument.

== Structural bias ==
Many observers believed that the government structures were set up in a way that gave Fujimori's re-election bid an unfair advantage. For example, the United States Department of State noted that generals of the Peruvian Army were removed from their positions if anti-Fujimori protests occurred in their jurisdiction, providing the army with an incentive to crack down on anti-government protesters. A cable from the American embassy to Peru noted that "gigantic pro-Fujimori slogans appeared on the sides of hills within some military reservations and bases. Mostly at night but sometimes in broad daylight, troops have been sighted from Tacna to Tumbes painting pro-Fujimori slogans and blacking out the slogans of opposition candidates. Military vehicles have been made available to government candidates to transport supplies and people at no charge" and that "routine public works projects" were arranged "to maximize electoral impact."

== Fraud ==
The elections were also marred with accusations of outright fraud. During the campaign, El Comercio broke a story about a "fábrica de firmas" (signature factory) in which many people worked signing a petition to register a pro-Fujimori political party. Several of the people involved admitted to their part in this scheme. Perhaps most damning, they had copied the signatures of voters from official ONPE voter-registration lists, which were provided to them.

Shortly before the election, several people, including JNE workers, were arrested for their part in the theft of ballots. They were caught with the ballots, many of which had been filled out. The plurality of these ballots was filled out with votes for Fujimori and his electoral allies.

== Boycott ==
After Fujimori was declared the victor of the first round, Alejandro Toledo called for a boycott of the second round. Fujimori responded by reminding voters that Peruvian law makes voting obligatory, and that anyone boycotting the election could be fined. Toledo then suggested that his supporters to spoil their ballots. The result was that while votes for Toledo declined from 40.24% of the valid votes cast in the first round to 25.67% of the valid votes in the second round, invalid votes jumped from 2.25% in of the total votes cast in the first round to 29.93% of total votes in the second round. That such a large percentage of votes were thrown out as invalid shows that many Peruvians took Toledo's advice and deliberately spoiled their ballots.

== OAS process ==
Following the election, the Organization of American States (OAS) established a "mesa" dialogue process (Mesa de Dialogo). The Mesa "filled the institutional vacuum caused by the polarization of political forces in Peru following the May 2000 elections. It became the locus of authoritative decisionmaking power during the final days of the Fujimori government, preparing the way for the Peruvian opposition to win control of the congress and to form an interim government." The dialogue was facilitated by a former foreign minister from the Dominican Republic, Eduardo Latorre, supported by a small OAS secretariat. The Mesa had eighteen participants and "deliberately incorporated three key sets of actors: government ministers, progovernment and opposition members of congress, and civil society representatives."

Alejandro Toledo and his Possible Peru political party were initially reluctant to engage in the Mesa, initially considering the OAS mission an attempt to prop up the Fujimori regime. Not wanting to either engage fully with the OAS mission or be isolated from the Mesa completely, Toledo remained at the edge of the process, allowing others to be directly involved in the negotiations, including Luis Solari. Toledo focused instead on international media appearances and organizing large demonstrations.

In the latter part of 2000 a series of dramatic events brought the dialogue potential of the Mesa into the foreground. On 14 September a videotape was broadcast showing security chief Vladimiro Montesinos bribing opposition congressman Alberto Kouri to join Fujimori's congressional coalition (Peru 2000). This prompted Fujimori to announce new elections and dismiss Montesinos. Further shocks followed, with Montesinos appearing in Panama to seek asylum, and then returning to Peru on 23 October, "creating fear of an imminent coup." Finally, on 20 November Fujimori faxed his resignation from Japan.

As these events unfolded, the mesa became increasingly prominent as a parallel congress with de facto political decision making power. In the institutional void created by congressional deadlock and political power struggles, few other nonviolent choices existed. As events during September and October led increasingly to a showdown between Fujimori and Montesinos, the former displayed a greater willingness to agree to political reforms in exchange for support from the OAS and the Peruvian political representatives assembled at the mesa. Despite all of the suspicions harbored by the opposition, the mesa remained a useful fallback option and a buffer against the threat of military disruption."

== Results ==
=== President ===
Candidate	Party	First round		Second round	
Candidate	Party	Votes	%	Votes	%
Alberto Fujimori	Peru 2000	5,528,568	49.87	6,041,685	74.33
Alejandro Toledo	Possible Peru	4,460,895	40.24	2,086,215	25.67
Alberto Andrade	We Are Peru	333,048	3.00		
Federico Salas	Avancemos	247,054	2.23		
Luis Castañeda Lossio	National Solidarity	199,814	1.80		
Abel Salinas	American Popular Revolutionary Alliance	153,319	1.38		
Ezequiel Ataucusi Gamonal	Agricultural People's Front of Peru	80,106	0.72		
Víctor Andrés García Belaúnde	Popular Action	46,523	0.42		
Máximo San Román	Union for Peru	36,543	0.33		
Total		11,085,870	100.00	8,127,900	100.00
Valid votes		11,085,870	91.88	8,127,900	68.88
Invalid/blank votes		980,359	8.12	3,672,410	31.12
Total votes		12,066,229	100.00	11,800,310	100.00
Registered voters/turnout		14,567,468	82.83	14,567,467	81.00
Source: Nohlen

=== Congress ===
Party	Votes	%	Seats	+/–
Peru 2000	4,189,018	42.16	52	New
Possible Peru	2,308,635	23.24	29	+24
Independent Moralizing Front	751,323	7.56	9	+3
We Are Peru	715,396	7.20	9	New
American Popular Revolutionary Alliance	546,930	5.51	6	–2
National Solidarity	399,985	4.03	4	New
Avancemos	307,188	3.09	3	New
Union for Peru	254,582	2.56	3	–14
Popular Action	245,115	2.47	3	0
Agricultural People's Front of Peru	216,953	2.18	2	+1
Total	9,935,125	100.00	120	0
Valid votes	9,935,125	83.19		
Invalid/blank votes	2,007,685	16.81		
Total votes	11,942,810	100.00		
Registered voters/turnout	14,567,468	81.98		
Source: Nohlen
