= Aldo Estrada =

Peruvian lawyer and politician

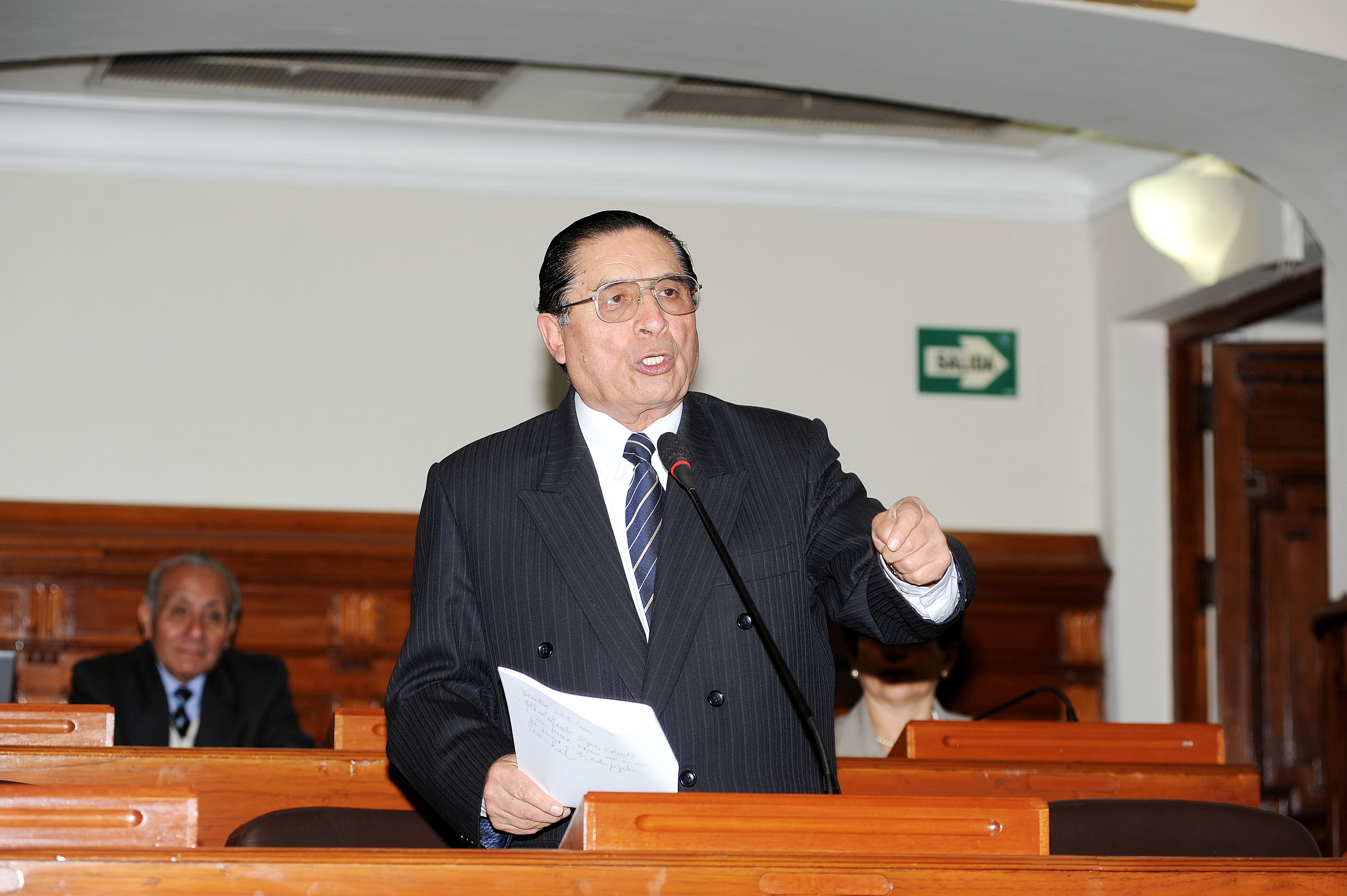

First Vice President of the Congress
- In office 26 July 2007 – 26 July 2008
- President: Luis Gonzales Posada
- Preceded by: José Vega
- Succeeded by: Alejandro Aguinaga

Member of the Congress
- In office 26 July 2006 – 26 July 2011
- Constituency: Puno
- In office 26 July 1995 – 26 July 2000
- Constituency: National

Member of the Chamber of Deputies
- In office 26 July 1980 – 26 July 1985
- Constituency: Puno

Personal details
- Born: Aldo Vladimiro Estrada Choque; 11 January 1939 (age 87) Juli, Peru
- Party: Union for Peru
- Other political affiliations: Socialist Left; National Front of Workers and Peasants
- Education: University of San Martín de Porres; National University of Saint Anthony the Abbot in Cuzco; Federico Villarreal National University
- Occupation: Politician
- Profession: Lawyer

Aldo Vladimiro Estrada Choque (born 11 January 1939) is a Peruvian lawyer and politician who is a former Congressman representing the constituency of Puno for the 2006–2011 term. He was previously congressman for the 1995–2000 term and a Deputy from 1980 to 1985 representing Puno. Estrada belongs to the Union for Peru party and is the leader of the Union for Peru.

== Biography ==
He was born in Juli, capital of the Province of Chucuito, department of Puno, on January 11, 1939 son of Héctor Estrada Serrano and Blanca Strada clash. He studied his primary and secondary studies in the hometown of him. The superiors held them at the Faculty of Law of the National University of Saint Anthony the Abbot in Cusco. He carried out his master's studies at the University of San Martín de Porres and Doctorate at the National University Federico Villarreal, both in the city of Lima. He also led specialization studies in criminal law compared to the Universities of Bloomington - Indiana of the United States of America and at the Autonomous University of Mexico.

During his student time he was vice president and president of the University Federation of Cusco. Then, as a lawyer, he was Dean of the Illustrious Cusco Bar Association for four periods and president of the Federation of Lawyers of Peru based in Lima for two years. He was also a university professor at the Faculties of Law of Universities: National University of Saint Anthony the Abbot in Cusco, National University of San Marcos, University of San Martín de Porres and the Academy of Magistracy.
