= Marco Parra =

Marco Parra may refer to:

- Marco Parra (footballer)
- Marco Parra (politician)
