= National Unity (Peru, 2000) =

National Unity Unidad Nacional
- Abbreviation: UN
- Leader: Lourdes Flores Nano
- Founded: 2000
- Dissolved: 2008
- Succeeded by: Alliance for the Great Change, National Solidarity Alliance
- Headquarters: Lima, Peru
- Ideology: Christian democracy Liberal conservatism Conservatism; Liberalism; Neoliberalism
- Political position: Centre-right

National Unity (Spanish: Unidad Nacional, UN) was a Peruvian center-right, mainly a Christian democratic electoral alliance.

== History ==
National Unity was founded in 2000 by Lourdes Flores Nano and was considered Peru's third largest party. The party participated in the 2001 general election, on 8 April 2001, where its presidential candidate, Lourdes Flores Nano, won 24.3% of the popular vote and failed to qualify in the June run-off, placing third. At the legislative elections held on the same day, the party won 13.8% of the popular vote and 17 out of 120 seats in the Congress of the Republic.

The Party itself was a loose alliance of the constituent political parties. Its members were initially the Christian People's Party (PPC) (Partido Popular Cristiano), National Solidarity (SN) (Solidaridad Nacional), National Renewal (RN) (Renovación Nacional) and Radical Change (RC) (Cambio Radical), but the latter two left the coalition, following the 2006 general election and during the campaign, respectively. PPC and SN renewed their alliance until 2008.

National Solidarity's leader Luis Castañeda Lossio ran for mayor of Lima in 2002 under National Unity's banner, defeating the incumbent Alberto Andrade, from Somos Perú and a former Christian People's Party member himself.

The party participated in the 2006 general election on 9 April, and was again headed by Lourdes Flores Nano. Flores placed third in the presidential vote with 23.8% of the vote, behind Ollanta Humala of the Union for Peru and Alan García of the Peruvian Aprista Party, and failed to qualify for the run-off in the June 2006 run-off vote. At the legislative elections held on 9 April 2006, the party won 15.3% of the popular vote and 17 out of 120 seats in Congress.

== Last years and dissolution ==
In 2008, both PPC and SN decided to end the coalition. In the 2011 general election, SN (led by Luis Castañeda Lossio) decided to run for presidency under their own alliance; whilst PPC decided to integrate a new coalition called Alliance for the Great Change, led by Pedro Pablo Kuczynski, which participated in the elections as well.

== Election results ==
=== Presidential elections ===
| Year | Candidate | Coalition | Votes | Percentage | Outcome |
|---|---|---|---|---|---|
| 2001 | Lourdes Flores | National Unity PPC-SN-RN-CR | 2 576 653 | 24.30 | 3rd |
| 2006 | Lourdes Flores | National Unity PPC-SN-RN | 2 923 280 | 23.81 | 3rd |

=== Elections to the Congress of the Republic ===
| Year | Votes | % | Seats | ▲/▼ | Position |
|---|---|---|---|---|---|
| 2001 | 1 304 037 | 13.8% | 17 / 120 | ▲17 | Minority |
| 2006 | 1 648 717 | 15.3% | 17 / 120 | Steady | Minority |
