= Rosa Bartra =

Peruvian politician

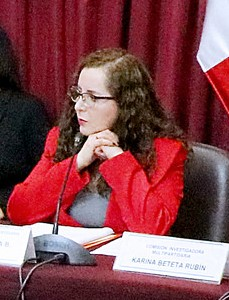

Member of Congress
- In office 26 July 2016 – 16 March 2020
- Constituency: La Libertad

Personal details
- Born: Rosa María Bartra Barriga; 20 December 1973 (age 52) Huamachuco, La Libertad, Peru
- Relatives: Tania Bartra (sister)
- Education: Colegio Nacional San Nicolás; National University of Trujillo; San Pedro University

Rosa María Bartra Barriga (born 20 December 1973) is a Peruvian lawyer, politician and pharmaceutical chemist who served as a congresswoman for La Libertad from 2016 to 2020. She successfully ran for the post of parliamentarian in the 2016 elections with the Fujimorist party, Popular Force and in the 2020 elections with National Solidarity, failing to be elected, being invited by these two political organizations on both occasions.

== Early years ==
Rosa María Bartra Barriga was born on 20 December 1973 in the Huamachuco District of the homonymous city in the department of La Libertad of Peru.
