= Marco Parra (politician) =

Peruvian politician and lawyer

Marco Parra Sánchez

Mayor of Lima
- In office October 11, 2010 – December 31, 2010
- Preceded by: Luis Castañeda Lossio
- Succeeded by: Susana Villarán

Personal details
- Born: 2 September 1969 (age 57) Lima, Peru
- Party: National Solidarity
- Profession: Lawyer

Marco Antonio Parra Sánchez (born 2 September 1969) is a Peruvian politician and lawyer who served as Interim Mayor of Lima from October 11, 2010 to January 1, 2011, when Luis Castañeda Lossio resigned, who was planning to run in the 2011 presidential election. Parra Sanchez belongs to the National Solidarity.

== Biography ==
He worked in public and private activity until, meeting with a group of supporters and businessmen, they decided to launch the candidacy of Luis Castañeda Lossio for the Presidency of the Republic of Peru in 2000, working together with him in the National Solidarity Party.

He worked at the Cauvi & Benites Law Firm, together with Enrique Parodi Plaza, deputy of Raúl Villacorta. Later, as a qualified lawyer, he associated with Carlos Hamman Pastorino, former director of Norsac and former head of the Financial Intelligence Unit of the Peruvian Government, with whom he founded Parra & Hamman, Abogados y Consultores, S.A.C.

From 2002 to October 2010 he served as Lieutenant Mayor of the Municipality of Lima, under mayor Luis Castañeda Lossio.

He unsuccessfully ran for a seat in the Congress of the Republic in the 2006 elections.

=== Mayor of Lima ===
Marco Parra took office as mayor on 11 October 2010, following the resignation as mayor of Luis Castañeda Lossio, to run in the 2011 presidential election. After the elections in October 2010, he was succeeded on 1 January 2011 by Susana Villarán.

Political offices
Preceded by Luis Castañeda Lossio	Mayor of Lima; October 11, 2010 – December 31, 2010	Succeeded by Susana Villarán
