= COVID-19 vaccination in Peru =

Plan to immunize against COVID-19

- Date: 9 February 2021
- Location: Peru
- Cause: COVID-19 pandemic in Peru
- Target: Immunisation of Peruvians against COVID-19
- Organised by: Ministry of Health of Peru
- Website: Gobierno del Perú

The COVID-19 vaccination program in Peru is the national vaccination strategy to protect the population against SARS-CoV-2 employing vaccines developed for the COVID-19 pandemic in Peru. Vaccination began on 9 February 2021, after three days of arrival of first vaccines. On a nation message, the head of state Francisco Sagasti confirmed the purchase of 38 millions of vaccines, being one million of vaccines for health personnel.

== Timeline ==
=== Arrival of the first vaccines ===
On 7 February 2021 at 19:54 h (UTC−5), 300,000 vaccines lot of Sinopharm coming from China arrived at the airport Jorge Chávez. This event was overseen by the president, Francisco Sagasti. Shortly after, the head of state reported that on 14 February a remaining lot 700,000 vaccines will also arrive to the country. On 8 February 2021, a thousand police officers were reported to guard the warehouse of National Center for the Supply of Strategic Health Resources (CENARES, acronym in Spanish).

== Vaccine distribution ==
According to the Government of Peru, the vaccination is predicted in three phases.

Stage	People included
1	Health sector personnel; National Police; Armed Forces; General Corps of Volunteer Firefighters; Peruvian red cross; Serenazgo (Watchman unit); Staff of the National Institute of Civil Defence (INDECI); Health-related science students.; Board members of the 2021 national elections
2	People over 60 years and with comorbidity.; Native or indigenous population; Prison staff
3	People over 18 years of age

== Public opinion ==
According to the study presented by IPSOS, a French sociological and market research company, the acceptance of the vaccine in the Peruvian population was below 50% until January 2021 due to an environment of mistrust in the management of the Vaccination and management of the pandemic during the government of Martín Vizcarra and Francisco Sagasti. As of February 2021, the period that begins the vaccination process, the study revealed a slow and steady increase in the acceptance of the COVID-19 vaccine.

Question: "Do you want to be vaccinated, do you not want to be vaccinated or have you already been vaccinated?
Option Month	I do want to get vaccinated	I don't want to get vaccinated	I already got vaccinated	Not precise	Source
Aug 2020*	75%	22%	0%	3%	
Dec 2020*	57%	40%	0%	3%	
Jan 2021*	48%	48%	0%	4%	
Feb 2021*	59%	35%	0%	6%	
Mar 2021**	60%	33%	0%	7%	
May 2021*	63%	30%	4%	3%	

Note: (*) It was asked how "If right now a vaccine approved by the Ministry of Health and free to prevent the COVID-19, do you? would you be vaccinated or not vaccinated?
Note 2: (**) He wondered how "If tomorrow it's your turn for the COVID-19 vaccine, would you or would you not get the vaccine?"

== Vaccines on order ==
Vaccine name	Doses	Progress	Quantity	Approval	Deployment	Last delivery
Sinopharm BIBP	Two	Phase III clinical trials	6 million	6 January 2021	7 February 2021	5 June 2021
Pfizer–BioNTech	Two	Phase III clinical trials	20,5 million	9 February 2021	3 March 2021	1 July 2021
Pfizer–BioNTech	Two	Phase III clinical trials	12 million	6 May 2021	3 March 2021	1 July 2021
Pfizer–BioNTech	Two	Phase III clinical trials	35 million	17 September 2021	3 March 2021	1 July 2021
Oxford–AstraZeneca and Pfizer–BioNTech (by Covax Facility)	Two	Phase III clinical trials	13,2 million	18 September 2020	10 March 2021	3 June 2021
Oxford–AstraZeneca	Two	Phase III clinical trials	14 million	6 January 2021	Not yet	Not yet
Johnson & Johnson	One	Phase III clinical trials	Pending	8 July 2021	Not yet	Not yet
Sputnik V	Two	Phase III clinical trials	20 million	20 July 2021	Not yet	Not yet
Moderna	Two	Phase III clinical trials	20 million	17 September 2021	Not yet	Not yet

Chronology of the doses arrived in Peru
No.	Vaccine name	Quantity	Arrival date	Source(s)
1	Sinopharm BIBP	300,000	7 February 2021	
2	Sinopharm BIBP	700,000	13 February 2021	
3	Pfizer–BioNTech	50,000	3 March 2021	
4	Pfizer–BioNTech (by Covax Facility)	117,000	10 March 2021	
5	Pfizer–BioNTech	50,000	10 March 2021	
6	Pfizer–BioNTech	50,000	17 March 2021	
7	Pfizer–BioNTech	50,310	24 March 2021	
8	Pfizer–BioNTech	49,140	31 March 2021	
9	Pfizer–BioNTech	200,070	7 April 2021	
10	Pfizer–BioNTech	200,700	14 April 2021	
11	Oxford-AstraZeneca (by Covax Facility)	276,000	18 April 2021	
12	Pfizer–BioNTech	200,700	21 April 2021	
13	Pfizer–BioNTech	200,000	28 April 2021	
14	Pfizer–BioNTech	350,000	6 May 2021	
15	Pfizer–BioNTech	350,000	7 May 2021	
16	Pfizer–BioNTech	700,000	13 May 2021	
17	Pfizer–BioNTech	395,000	17 May 2021	
18	Pfizer–BioNTech	395,000	20 May 2021	
19	Pfizer–BioNTech	396,630	24 May 2021	
20	Pfizer–BioNTech	395,460	26 May 2021	
21	Oxford-AstraZeneca (by Covax Facility)	511,200	29 May 2021	
22	Pfizer–BioNTech	251,550	31 May 2021	
23	Sinopharm BIBP	700,000	2 June 2021	
24	Pfizer–BioNTech (by Covax Facility)	468,000	3 June 2021	
25	Pfizer–BioNTech	250,380	3 June 2021	
26	Pfizer–BioNTech	242,190	4 June 2021	
27	Sinopharm BIBP	300,000	5 June 2021	
28	Pfizer–BioNTech	496,080	10 June 2021	
29	Pfizer–BioNTech	497,250	17 June 2021	
30	Pfizer–BioNTech	497,250	24 June 2021	
31	Pfizer–BioNTech (United States donation)	1,002,000	29 June 2021	
32	Pfizer–BioNTech	497,250	1 July 2021	
33	Pfizer–BioNTech (United States donation)	998,000	7 July 2021	
34	Sinopharm BIBP	614,400	10 July 2021	
35	Sinopharm BIBP	385,600	11 July 2021	
36	Pfizer–BioNTech	281,970	15 July 2021	
37	Pfizer–BioNTech	886,860	22 July 2021	
38	Pfizer–BioNTech	936,000	26 July 2021	
39	Pfizer–BioNTech	196,560	30 July 2021	
40	Sinopharm BIBP	1,000,000	1 August 2021	
41	Oxford–AstraZeneca (Spain donation)	101,760	4 August 2021	
42	Pfizer–BioNTech	475,020	5 August 2021	
43	Pfizer–BioNTech	569,790	12 August 2021	
44	Sinopharm BIBP	1,000,000	15 August 2021	
45	Pfizer–BioNTech	594,360	20 August 2021	
46	Sinopharm BIBP	614,400	21 August 2021	
47	Sinopharm BIBP	385,600	22 August 2021	
48	Pfizer–BioNTech	540,540	26 August 2021	
49	Sinopharm BIBP	1,000,000	29 August 2021	
50	Oxford–AstraZeneca (Canada donation)	35,100	2 September 2021	
51	Pfizer–BioNTech	662,220	3 September 2021	
52	Sinopharm BIBP	2,000,000	4 September 2021	
53	Pfizer–BioNTech	748,800	6 September 2021	
54	Oxford–AstraZeneca (by Covax Facility)	362,400	8 September 2021	
55	Sinopharm BIBP	2,862,500	10 September 2021	
56	Sinopharm BIBP	3,342,600	11 September 2021	
57	Sinopharm BIBP	794,900	12 September 2021	
58	Pfizer–BioNTech	748,800	13 September 2021	
59	Oxford–AstraZeneca (Ecuador donation)	336,000	13 September 2021	
60	Oxford–AstraZeneca (by Covax Facility)	146,400	14 September 2021	

Dose count and statistics
Vaccine name	Quantity	Total	% of population		Target population	% of population		Population (est. 2020)
Vaccine name	Quantity	Total	One dose	Two dose	Target population	One dose	Two dose	Population (est. 2020)
Sinopharm BIBP	16,000,000	33,761,600	123.92%	61.96%	27,244,203	103.48%	51.74%	32,625,948
Pfizer-BioNTech	15,992,740	33,761,600	123.92%	61.96%	27,244,203	103.48%	51.74%	32,625,948
Oxford-AstraZeneca	1,768,860	33,761,600	123.92%	61.96%	27,244,203	103.48%	51.74%	32,625,948

== Vaccines in trial stage ==
Vaccine	Type (technology)	Phase I	Phase II	Phase III
Sinopharm BIBP	Inactivated	Completed	Completed	Completed
Pfizer–BioNTech	RNA	Completed	Completed	Completed
Oxford–AstraZeneca	Viral vector	Completed	Completed	Completed
Janssen	Viral vector	Completed	Completed	In progress
CureVac	RNA	Completed	Completed	In progress

== Statistics ==
=== By department ===
COVID-19 vaccination by department September 15, 2021 (UTC−5)
Department and autonomous province	First dose		Second dose		Cumulative dose	Population (est. 2020)
Department and autonomous province	Total	% of pop.	Total	% of pop.	Cumulative dose	Population (est. 2020)
Peru	12,391,748	37.98%	8,933,405	27.38%	21,325,153	32,625,948
Amazonas	136,284	31.93%	87,684	20.54%	223,968	426,806
Ancash	462,904	39.21%	335,213	28.39%	798,117	1,180,638
Apurimac	173,013	40.17%	109,310	25.38%	282,323	430,736
Arequipa	631,543	42.17%	461,804	30.84%	1,093,347	1,497,438
Ayacucho	213,214	31.91%	132,005	19.75%	345,219	668,213
Cajamarca	476,824	32.80%	318,320	21.90%	795,144	1,453,711
Callao province	579,182	51.26%	435,523	38.55%	1,014,705	1,129,854
Cusco	444,355	32.74%	333,979	24.61%	778,334	1,357,075
Huancavelica	127,322	34.85%	94,532	25.88%	221,854	365,317
Huanuco	206,599	27.17%	128,563	16.91%	335,162	760,267
Ica	400,451	41.06%	265,235	27.20%	665,686	975,182
Junin	508,964	37.38%	397,651	29.21%	906,615	1,361,467
La Libertad	661,806	32.82%	443,839	22.01%	1,105,645	2,016,771
Lambayeque	386,439	29.48%	277,086	21.14%	663,525	1,310,785
Lima	444,891	46.65%	295,779	31.01%	740,670	953,715
Lima province	4,456,211	46.06%	3,425,830	35.41%	7,882,041	9,674,755
Loreto	215,317	20.95%	147,365	14.34%	362,682	1,027,559
Madre de Dios	40,197	23.13%	26,153	15.05%	66,350	173,811
Moquegua	80,252	41.64%	61,156	31.73%	141,408	192,740
Pasco	112,817	41.49%	81,992	30.15%	194,809	271,904
Piura	625,908	30.56%	422,917	20.65%	1,048,825	2,047,954
Puno	274,952	22.21%	150,940	12.19%	425,892	1,237,997
San Martin	281,842	31.33%	189,418	21.05%	471,260	899,648
Tacna	198,557	53.52%	147,786	39.84%	346,343	370,974
Tumbes	93,790	37.29%	58,474	23.25%	152,264	251,521
Ucayali	158,114	26.84%	104,851	17.80%	262,965	589,110

=== Progress of the vaccination campaign ===
COVID-19 vaccination progress in Peru Estimated population to be vaccinated: 27,244,203 people 45.5% complete (Inoculated with first dose) 32.8% complete (Inoculated with second dose)
Date	First dose			Second dose			Cumulative dose
Date	Total	Variation	% of pop.	Total	Variation	% of pop.	Cumulative dose
9-feb-21	3,842	3,842	0.01%	0	0	0.00%	3,842
15-feb-21	110,792	106,950	0.41%	0	0	0.00%	110,792
1-mar-21	321,851	211,059	1.18%	0	0	0.00%	321,851
15-mar-21	430,874	109,023	1.58%	173,578	173,578	0.64%	604,452
1-apr-21	662,463	231,589	2.43%	377,945	204,367	1.39%	1,040,408
15-abr-21	743,077	80,614	2.73%	544,887	166,942	2.00%	1,287,964
1-may-21	1,127,587	384,510	4.14%	687,606	142,719	2.52%	1,815,193
15-may-21	1,815,080	687,493	6.66%	825,828	138,222	3.03%	2,640,908
1-jun-21	2,984,620	1,169,540	10.96%	1,332,284	506,456	4.89%	4,316,904
15-jun-21	3,829,456	844,836	14.06%	2,236,998	904,714	8.21%	6,066,454
1-Jul-21	4,612,161	782,705	16.93%	3,287,742	1,050,744	12.07%	7,899,903
15-jul-21	6,474,729	1,862,568	23.77%	3,845,047	557,305	14.11%	10,319,776
1-aug-21	8,035,796	1,561,067	29.50%	5,287,167	1,442,120	19.41%	13,322,963
15-aug-21	9,215,626	1,023,435	33.83%	6,920,113	1,437,778	25.40%	16,135,739
1-sep-21	10,519,572	1,184,432	38.61%	8,314,606	1,191,212	30.52%	18,834,178
15-sep-21	12,391,748	1,747,180	45.48%	8,933,405	495,538	32.79%	21,325,153

=== Demographics ===
Vaccination by sex and age, registered on September 15, 2021
Year group	Male		Female		First dose		Second dose		Cumulative dose	Population (est. 2020)
Year group	One dose	Two dose	One dose	Two dose	Total	% of pop.	Total	% of pop.	Cumulative dose	Population (est. 2020)
Total	5,883,925	4,205,383	6,507,830	4,728,027	12,391,755	37.98%	8,933,410	27.38%	21,325,165	32,625,948
0-9	0	0	0	0	0	0.00%	0	0.00%	0	5,384,070
10-19	1	2	1	2	2	0.00%	4	0.00%	6	5,206,372
20-29	268,104	165,164	276,265	147,666	544,369	10.07%	312,830	5.79%	857,199	5,403,670
30-39	902,481	227,252	1,048,431	295,265	1,950,912	38.78%	522,517	10.39%	2,473,429	5,031,117
40-49	1,469,356	916,504	1,618,837	1,057,378	3,088,193	73.82%	1,973,882	47.19%	5,062,075	4,183,147
50-59	1,323,836	1,122,048	1,433,083	1,243,231	2,756,919	84.13%	2,365,279	72.18%	5,122,198	3,277,134
60-69	991,384	906,676	1,065,272	983,839	2,056,656	92.59%	1,890,515	85.11%	3,947,171	2,221,241
70-79	598,883	560,388	653,300	614,198	1,252,183	98.45%	1,174,586	92.35%	2,426,769	1,271,842
80+	329,878	307,348	412,638	386,448	742,516	114.70%	693,796	107.17%	1,436,312	647,355
No data	2	1	3	0	5	-	1	-	6	-

=== Graphs ===
==== Departments by type of vaccines ====
- Last updated: September 15, 2021.

Data source: Platform of "Datos abiertos", Government of Peru.

==== Inoculated doses in provinces ====
- Last updated: September 15, 2021.

Percentage of population (2020) with second dose in most populated provinces of the country.

Note: Name of provinces and department name in parentheses. Chiclayo (Lambayeque), Coronel Portillo (Ucayali), Huancayo (Junin), Lima (Lima province), Maynas (Loreto), Santa (Ancash) and Trujillo (La Libertad)
Data source: Platform of "Datos abiertos", Government of Peru.

==== Districts of Lima with the most vaccinations ====
- Last updated: September 15, 2021.

Districts of the city of Lima with the highest reception of people who were inoculated with the two doses with respect to the size of their population (est. 2020). The districts with the highest percentage vaccinate people who come from other districts and have large vaccination centers.

Data source: Platform of "Datos abiertos", Government of Peru.

==== Vaccine distribution ====
- Last updated: September 15, 2021.

Data source: Platform of "Datos abiertos", Government of Peru.

==== Vaccination progress ====
- Last updated: September 15, 2021.

Data source: Platform of "Datos abiertos", Government of Peru.
