= José Vega (politician) =

Peruvian politician

José Vega Antonio
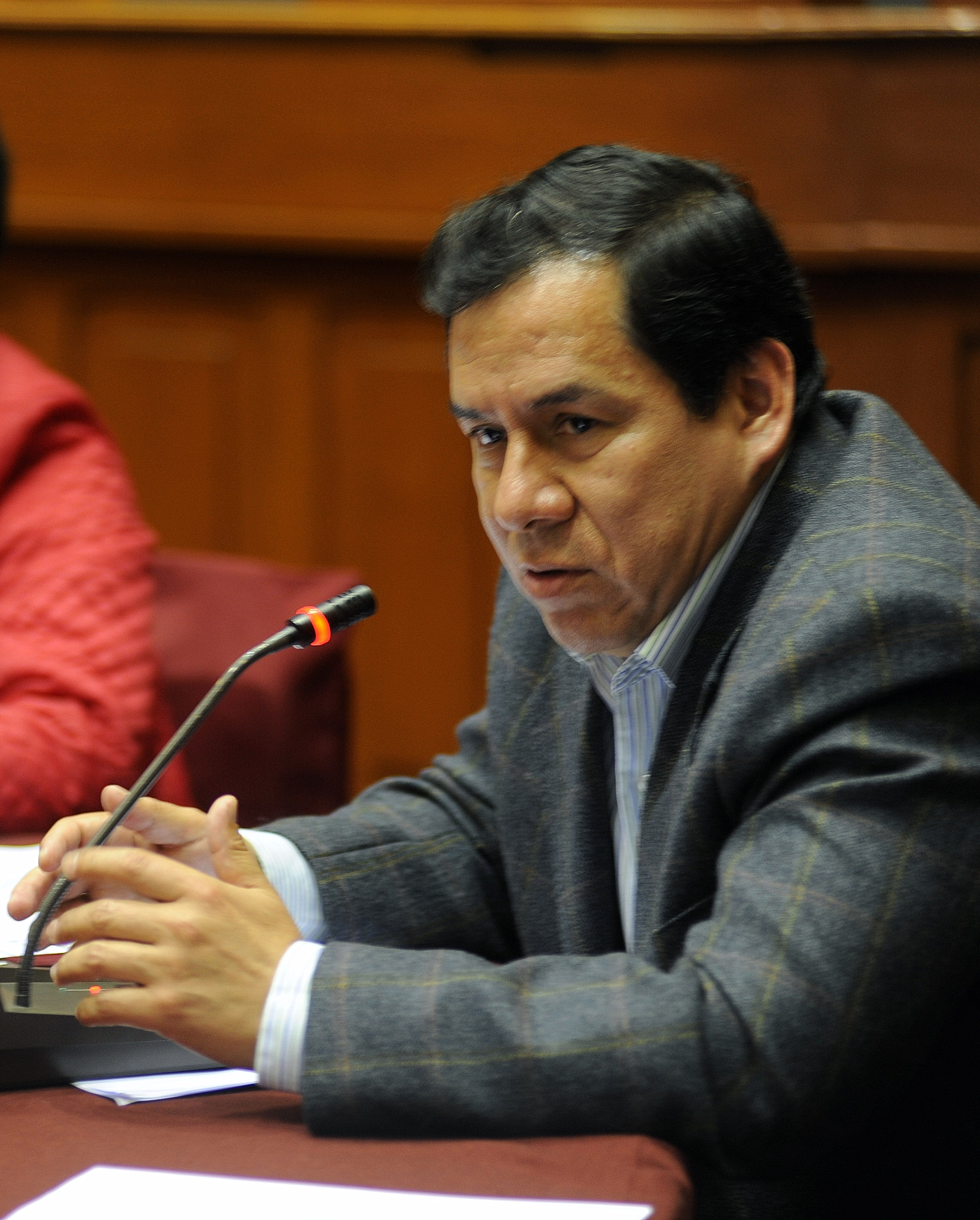
- Former Congressman Vega in 2010

Member of Congress
- In office 16 March 2020 – 26 July 2021
- Constituency: Lima
- In office 26 July 2006 – 26 July 2011
- Constituency: Lima

General Secretary of the Union for Peru
- Incumbent
- Assumed office 21 March 2014

Personal details
- Born: José Alejandro Vega Antonio; 18 November 1957 (age 68) Lima, Peru
- Party: Union for Peru
- Other political affiliations: National Solidarity Alliance (2010–2011)

José Alejandro Vega Antonio (born 18 November 1957) is a Peruvian politician and a congressman representing Lima since 2020. He was previously a congressman for the 2006-2011 term representing Lima. He was first vice president of Congress between 2006 and 2007 under the leadership of Mercedes Cabanillas. In the 2020 snap parliamentary election, after a nine-year absence, he was once again elected as a congressman representing the same constituency to complete the 2016-2021 term that was interrupted following to the dissolution of the Congress. Vega belongs to the Union for Peru party in which he is the party's general secretary. He ran for president in the 2021 elections, receiving 0.7 percent of the vote in its first round.

== Early life and career ==
Vega was born in Lima, on 18 November 1957.

He worked at Banco Comercial (1979–1984), as well as at Banco Popular (1985–1992). He was a union leader of the Federation of Bank Employees of Peru (1984–1991), as well as a delegate of the General Confederation of Workers of Peru - CGTP (1985–1990).

== Political career ==
In 1994, he co-founded the Union for Peru party, along with Javier Pérez de Cuéllar. In that party, he held the positions of general secretary in the district of San Juan de Lurigancho, Lima (1995–1999), and later for all Metropolitan Lima (1999–2001), integrating the National Steering Committee of UPP. Between 2001 and 2003 he was general secretary of the Departmental Committee of Lima.

In 2004, he was elected National General Secretary of UPP, addressing as such subsequently the Electoral Campaign of 2006, in alliance with the nascent Peruvian Nationalist Party (PNP) of Ollanta Humala, who would be the presidential candidate.

=== Congressman ===
In the 2006 elections, he was elected to Congress to represent Lima on the Union for Peru-Peruvian Nationalist Party ticket the 2006-2011 term representing Lima. During the congressional leadership of Mercedes Cabanillas, Vega was the first vice president of Congress between 2006 and 2007. In the 2011 elections, Vega failed to attain re-election when he ran for re-election under the National Solidarity Alliance but was not elected. In the 2020 snap parliamentary election, after a nine-year absence, he was once again elected as a congressman representing the same constituency to complete the 2016-2021 term that was interrupted following to the dissolution of the Congress. During his parliamentary work, Vega was in favor of the removal of former president Martín Vizcarra during the two processes that took place for it, the second of which ended up removing the former president from power. The congressman supported the motion being one of the 105 parliamentarians who voted in favor of the removal of President Martín Vizcarra.

=== 2021 elections ===
Vega was nominated by his party for the presidency for the 2021 elections. He was disqualified on 29 December 2020, because of incomplete information regarding income on the nominees registration form; however, he was reinstated on 6 February 2021.
