= Union for Peru =

Peruvian political party

Union for Peru Unión por el Perú
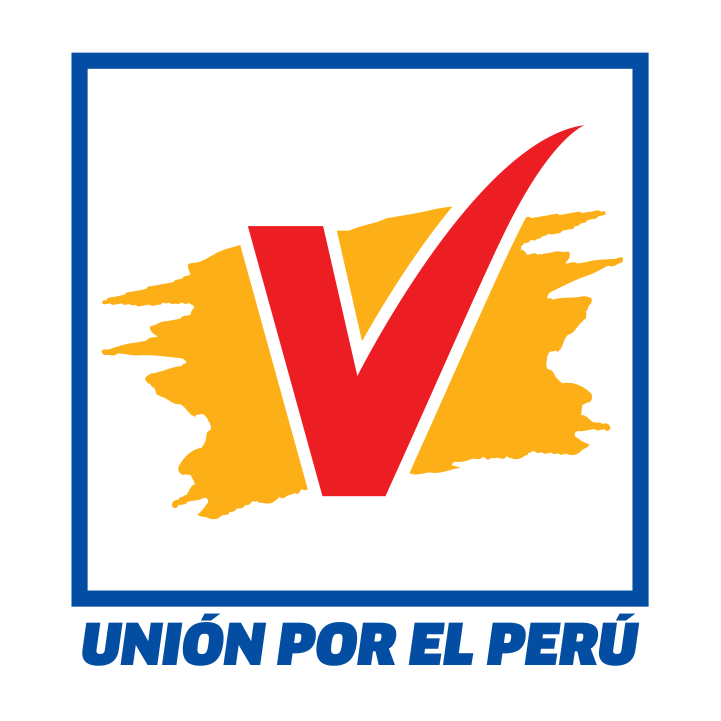
- Abbreviation: UPP
- Leader: Antauro Humala
- President: Aldo Estrada Choque
- Secretary-General: José Vega Antonio
- Founder: Javier Pérez de Cuéllar
- Founded: 21 September 1994; 32 years ago
- Headquarters: Lima, Peru
- Ideology: Ethnocacerism; Left-wing nationalism; Historical: Social democracy; Social liberalism; Progressivism
- Political position: Left-wing to far-left Historical: Centre to centre-left
- National affiliation: National Solidarity Alliance (2010-2011)
- Colors: Indigo, Red, Orange
- Congress: 0 / 130
- Governorships: 0 / 25
- Regional Councillors: 4 / 274
- Province Mayorships: 0 / 196
- District Mayorships: 0 / 1,874

Website
- upp.pe*

Union for Peru (Spanish: Unión por el Perú) is a Peruvian political party founded by Javier Pérez de Cuéllar, an ex-UN Secretary General, in 1994 to run for the presidency of Peru in the 1995 general elections. Originally a social democratic party, the party became the main political home of the Peruvian ethnocacerist movement in the late-2010s after a group led by former Army Major Antauro Humala joined the party. Humala later formed the Patriotic Front in 2018 and contested the 2021 general elections.

== History ==
Union for Peru was founded in 1994 by the former Secretary General of the United Nations, the diplomat Javier Pérez de Cuéllar together with Daniel Estrada Pérez and José Vega Antonio, to participate in the elections generals of 1995, against the-then president Alberto Fujimori, who was running for reelection.

At the elections held on 9 April 2000, the party nominated former Fujimorist first vice president Máximo San Román as its presidential candidate, but he performed poorly in the elections placing last with 0.3% of the popular vote but in the legislative elections, the party won 2.6% of the popular vote and only 3 out of 120 seats in the Congress of the Republic, a decrease of 14. During this parliamentary period, UPP made an alliance with the Popular Action bench in the legislature and both showed their opposition to the dictatorship of Alberto Fujimori.

Shortly after Alberto Fujimori won the 2000 elections amid accusations of electoral fraud, he decided to resign after the "Vladivideos" scandal and call general elections for 2001.

At the legislative elections held on 8 April 2001, the party won 4.1% of the popular vote and 6 out of 120 seats in the Congress of the Republic. However, they did not present a presidential candidate for that year's elections.

In the 2006 elections, Union for Peru aligned itself with the Peruvian Nationalist Party and endorsed Ollanta Humala, who faced Alan García in the presidential runoff election. In the congressional election, the alliance won with 21.2% of popular vote, and 45 out of 120 seats in the Congress. However, after the elections, the alliance split and the Nationalist sat on their own bench with Union for Peru sitting in their own bench too.

In the 2011 elections, the party joined forces with the National Solidarity Party to form the National Solidarity Alliance to support the presidential candidacy of former Lima Mayor Luis Castañeda Lossio. The alliance placed fifth at both the presidential and parliamentary election, attaining 9 out of 130 seats, with Vicente Zeballos and Martin Belaunde Moreya as the only two elected congressman from Union for Peru. The party would retain its alliance with the National Solidarity Party for the 2016 elections as well, jointly nominating Hernando Guerra García but the ticket withdrew due to its low support at national polls and fears of losing its status as a political party. In the 2020 snap parliamentary elections, the party won 6.8% of the vote and 13 seats out of 130 seats in the Congress after almost four years of absence in Congress. In the 2021 elections, the party nominated the party Secretary-General José Vega for the presidency, but, he was disqualified on 29 December 2020, because of incomplete information regarding income on the nominees registration form, but he was reinstated on 6 February 2021. On the Election Day, Vega places 14th with 0.7% of the vote, while in the congressional election, the party lost all of its 13 seats and only won 2.1% of the vote and the party is expected to lose its party registration.

The party's Secretary-General as of 2021 was José Vega Antonio.

== Electoral history ==
=== Presidential elections ===
Year	Candidate	Party / Coalition	Votes	Percentage	Outcome
1995	Javier Pérez de Cuéllar	Union for Peru	1 624 566	21.81	2nd
2000	Máximo San Román	Union for Peru	36 543	0.33	9th
2006	Ollanta Humala	Union for Peru UPP-PNP	1st Round: 3 758 258	1st Round: 30.62	1st Round: 1st
2006	Ollanta Humala	Union for Peru UPP-PNP	2nd Round: 6 270 080	47.37	2nd Round: 2nd
2011	Luis Castañeda	National Solidarity Alliance SN-C90-TPP-SU-UPP	1 440 143	9.83	5th
2016	Hernando Guerra García	National Solidarity-UPP Electoral Alliance	Ticket withdrawn	N/A	N/A
2021	José Vega	Union for Peru	99,321	0.70	14th

=== Elections to the Congress of the Republic ===
Election	Votes	%	Number of seats	▲/▼	Position
1995	611 804	14.0%	17 / 120	▲17	Minority
2000	254 582	2.6%	3 / 120	▼14	Minority
2001	390 236	4.1%	6 / 120	▲3	Minority
2006	2 274 739 as part of PNP - UPP electoral alliance. 20 were from UPP.	21.1%	45 / 120	▲14	Minority
2011	1 311 766 as part of National Solidarity Alliance. Only 2 from Union for Peru.	10.2%	9 / 130	▼18	Minority
2016	List withdrawn	–	N/A	Steady	N/A
2020	1 001 716	6.8%	13 / 130	▲13	Minority
2021	266 349	2.07%	0 / 130	▼13	Extra-parliamentary
