= National Solidarity Alliance =

National Solidarity Alliance Alianza Solidaridad Nacional
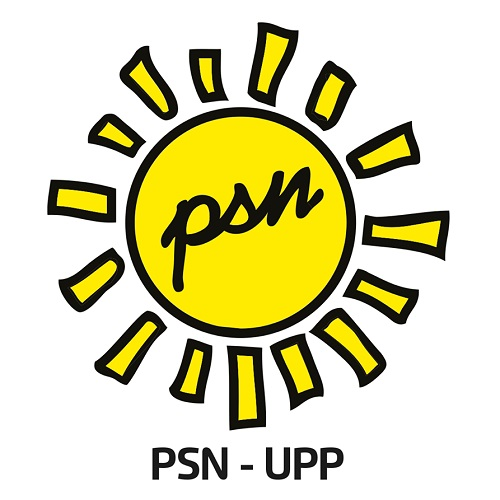
- Abbreviation: ASN
- Leader: Luis Castañeda
- Founded: December 11, 2010
- Dissolved: July 20, 2011
- Ideology: Liberal conservatism Conservatism (Peruvian); Liberalism (Peruvian); Right-wing populism
- Political position: Right-wing
- Colors: Yellow

The National Solidarity Alliance (Spanish: Alianza Solidaridad Nacional, ASN) was an electoral alliance in Peru formed for the 2011 general election, dominated by the eponymous National Solidarity Party and led by presidential candidate Luis Castañeda.

== Constituent Parties ==
- National Solidarity (Partido Solidaridad Nacional, PSN), liberal conservative, Castañeda's personalist vehicle
- Union for Peru (Unión por el Perú, UPP), the centrist, social liberal core of the party, after Ollanta Humala's Nationalists left the alliance
- Change 90 (Cambio 90, C90), the splinter of the former main force of Fujimorism that has not followed Keiko Fujimori to the new Force 2011
- Always Together (Siempre Unidos)
- All for Peru (Todos por el Perú), liberalism and centrism

In the 2006 election, National Solidarity Party (PSN) was part of the alliance National Unity, led by the Christian People's Party, the Union for Peru formed an alliance with the Peruvian Nationalist Party to promote the candidacy of its leader Ollanta Humala, Cambio 90 and Always Together participated in the Fujimorist Alliance for the Future. All for Peru (known as National Coordinator of Independents) was part of the Center Front.

In the congressional election on April 10, the alliance won 10.2% of the popular vote and 9 of 130 seats, making them the fifth-largest group in parliament. In the elections for the five Peruvian members of the Andean Parliament, they won 9.41% of the popular vote but no representative to the Andean Parliament.

Presidential candidate Luis Castañeda, initially considered a favorite, won 9.83% of the votes placing him fifth and failed to qualify for the run-off.

For the second round Castañeda suggested to vote for Force 2011 candidate Keiko Fujimori.

== Dissolution ==
Eight of the nine representatives elected on the alliance's lists formed the National Solidarity parliamentary group. Renzo Reggiardo of Cambio 90 instead joined the small APRA-led Parliamentary Coordination bloc. The alliance formally dissolved on July 20, 2011, following Reggiardo's exit from the caucus and the installation of the session of Congress.

=== 2016 elections ===
For the 2016 general elections, National Solidarity decided to form an alliance only with Union for Peru led by José Vega.

While All for Peru nominated Julio Guzmán for the presidency but, he was disqualified due to the irregularities in his nomination process .

For these elections, the alliance announced the candidacy of Hernando Guerra-García for the Presidency of the Republic together with José Luna Gálvez and Gustavo Rondón for the 1st and 2nd Vice Presidents of the Republic. However, on March 29 of the same year, the alliance decided to withdraw the presidential candidacy and its congressional list to prevent the political party from losing its registration with the JNE.

Finally, the alliance with UPP was dissolved in 2016.

== Electoral history ==
=== Presidential elections ===
Year	Candidate	Coalition	Votes	Percentage	Outcome
2011	Luis Castañeda	National Solidarity Alliance SN-C90-TPP-SU-UPP	1 440 143	9.83	5th
2016	Hernando Guerra García	National Solidarity-UPP Electoral Alliance	Ticket withdrawn	N/A	N/A

=== Congressional elections ===
Year	Votes	%	Number of seats	▲/▼	Position
2011	1 311 766	10.2%	9 / 130	▲9	Minority
2016	List withdrawn	N/A	N/A	Steady	N/A
