= National Solidarity (Peru) =

National Solidarity Party Partido Solidaridad Nacional
- Abbreviation: PSN
- President: Luis Castañeda Lossio
- Secretary-General: Rafael López Aliaga
- Founder: Luis Castañeda Lossio
- Founded: 5 May 1998
- Legalized: 4 May 2006
- Dissolved: 7 October 2020
- Split from: Popular Action
- Succeeded by: Popular Renewal
- Headquarters: Lima, Peru
- Ideology: Conservatism (Peruvian); Economic liberalism
- Political position: Right-wing

Website
- solidaridadnacional.pe

The National Solidarity Party (Spanish: Partido Solidaridad Nacional, PSN), was a conservative Peruvian political party. Founded in 1998 for the 2000 general election to support the candidacy of Luis Castañeda Lossio, a former Lima City Council member from Popular Action. Following the end of Alberto Fujimori's regime, the party formed the National Unity coalition with the Christian People's Party and other minor parties. Led by Lourdes Flores, the coalition placed third at the 2001 and 2006 general elections, while at municipal level, it won the capital city of Lima with Castañeda as the mayoral nominee.

Throughout Castañeda's first two terms as Mayor of Lima from 2003 to 2010, National Solidarity remained a strong municipal party, while at national level in the Peruvian Congress, representation was slim as the National Unity coalition was mostly dominated by Christian People's Party. For the 2011 general election, the party left the coalition to form its own eponymous one under the name of National Solidarity Alliance, with other four minor parties. With Luis Castañeda as the presidential nominee, the won 9.8% of the popular vote, placing fifth, while in the Peruvian Congress, the alliance attained 9 representatives.

At the legislative elections held on 26 January 2020, the party won 1.5% of the popular vote but no seats in the Congress of the Republic under businessman Rafael López Aliaga's leadership. Upon the results, the party announced a restructuring process, which ended in National Solidarity's re-foundation as Popular Renewal.

== History ==
=== Foundation and National Unity ===
National Solidarity was founded on 5 May 1998 by Luis Castañeda Lossio based on the principles of economic liberalism and republicanism. The organization was officially declared a party on 4 May 2006, by the National Elections Jury.

Although at the beginning the party emerged as an opposition party to Fujimorism, and even at one point in the early stages of the 2000 campaign, Luis Castañeda Lossio was considered a potential opposition leader to the regime, the party eventually shifted ideologically to the right-wing, which is the basis of Fujimorism historically. On December 18, 1999, National Solidarity launched the candidacy of Luis Castañeda Lossio at a rally in Chiclayo that drew 6,000 attendees for the 2000 general election, but attained only 1.8% of the popular vote, placing fifth, behind Federico Salas (Avancemos), Alberto Andrade (We are Peru), Alejandro Toledo (Peru Posible) and Alberto Fujimori (Peru 2000). In the same election, Alberto Fujimori was reelected for a third presidential term, but his regime would eventually collapse amid a corruption scandal. The party was initially represented by 5 congressmen, but 3 ended up switching to a different caucus in the opening session of Congress leaving only with 2 congressmen only.

Following the fall of the Fujimori regime and after Valentín Paniagua assumed the position of transitional President, he called for general elections for April 8, 2001.

In those new elections. National Solidarity presented for the second time the candidacy of Luis Castañeda Lossio to the Presidency of the Republic. At the beginning of January 2001, National Solidarity registered the presidential plate that it presented for the elections of that year in which Castañeda was accompanied as presidential candidate by the businessman and former Fujimorist first vice president Máximo San Román and the obstetrician Mirtha Ortiz, as first second vice president respectively.

Due to the return of the traditional parties (the APRA with Alan García and the Christian People’s Party with Lourdes Flores), the rise of Alejandro Toledo from Possible Peru and taking into account that in the last election, Castañeda Lossio only got 1.8% From the electorate's votes, National Solidarity withdrew its presidential plate a month after having registered it and decided to support the candidacy of Lourde Flores.

Afterwards, National Solidarity sealed a coalition with the Christian People's Party and National Renewal, under the name of National Unity. With former congresswoman Lourdes Flores as the presidential nominee at the 2001 general election, the coalition ended up third with 24.3% of the popular vote, but failed to qualify to the run-off. Having the coalition attained 17 congressional representatives (and mainly from Lima), National Solidarity was represented by 3, while the PPC held the majority of the caucus. Of the 3 party congressmen, César Acuña of La Libertad ended leaving the caucus only 5 months into the election in order to found his own political party, Alliance for Progress.

=== Lima mayoralty under Castañeda (2003-2010) ===
As Alejandro Toledo of Possible Peru won the presidency at the 2001 general election, National Unity and the Peruvian Aprista Party formed the main opposition caucuses in the Peruvian Congress. At municipal level, the coalition succeeded in launching National Solidarity leader Luis Castañeda Lossio for the mayorship of Lima, which ended up defeating incumbent mayor Alberto Andrade of We Are Peru who is a former member of the Christian People's Party, and winning the capital with 39.9% of the popular vote.

During his first term, Castañeda carried out successful public works such as the Metropolitano bus system, the Solidarity hospitals, the Magic Water Circuit, the solidarity stairs and the expansion of the Evitamiento road. At the 2006 municipal election, the coalition selected the incumbent Castañeda for reelection, easily winning a plurality of votes with 47.8% of the popular vote. During Castañeda's second term, almost all the city council members were from National Solidarity.

=== Last National Unity campaign (2005-06) and solo campaign (2010-11) ===
At the 2006 general election, the coalition nominated Lourdes Flores once again for the presidency, but ended up placing third again with 23.8% of the popular vote, failing to qualify for the run-off. Peruvian Aprista Party nominee and former President Alan García eventually won the election against nationalist Ollanta Humala. At congressional level, National Unity attained 17 representatives again, but coalition would formally dissolve in 2008. National Solidarity's representatives formed their own caucus for the rest of the term.

In October 2010, Castañeda formally resigned as Mayor of Lima in order to run for the presidency at the 2011 general election, under the National Solidarity Alliance. For the first months of the campaign, Castañeda polled in first place, but his support would eventually decline as more revelations on alleged corruption during his mayoral term appeared. The alliance once again placed fifth with 9.8% of the popular vote, and attained 9 congressional representatives (with the majority from National Solidarity). Likewise, National Solidarity joined forces with Union for Peru (UPP) "for the 2011 elections, where José Vega, general secretary of that party, appears with the number 7 for Lima." Other parliamentary candidacies were those of “David Waisman (number 5 on the SN list for Lima), Heriberto Benítez (head of the SN list in Ancash) and Gustavo Pacheco (number 23 in Lima), old acquaintances of Peruvian politics, who they make their debut as Castañeda collaborators ”. Ollanta Humala won the presidency against Keiko Fujimori, with the latter receiving support from Castañeda in the run-off contest. In June 2011, Renzo Reggiardo resigned from the alliance and joined the caucus made up of the 4 APRA parliamentarians and Carlos Bruce. Later, Heríberto Benitez also resigned from the alliance due to the criticism he received from his colleagues in the parliamentary group when the César Álvarez y la Centralita case broke out. During this term, the party took a more conservative stance in numerous bills, and ended up switching to the opposition in the final year, as the caucus votes were key in the vote of no confidence against Prime Minister Ana Jara in late-March 2015.

=== Second Lima mayoralty under Castañeda (2015-2018) ===
National Solidarity under José Luna as Secretary-General, sought to convert National Solidarity from a cadre party to a mass party, for which he insisted on projecting the image of an emerging provincial to attract votes and connect with the most impoverished districts by encouraging the participation of adults and youth in National Solidarity activities and meetings. This shift succeeded in bringing back Castañeda to the office of Mayor of Lima, winning more than 50% of the popular vote in the 2014 municipal election. Although, during Castañeda's third term, more corruption allegations came to light, as the party was involved in Odebrecht scandal. Following the conclusion of his term as mayor, Castañeda decided against running for reelection, and tried to maintain a low profile. The party launched as its mayoral nominee Luis Castañeda Pardo, Castañeda's son, who attained 2.6% of the popular vote, placing ninth.

=== Last years ===
At the 2016 general election, National Solidarity sealed an alliance with Union for Peru in order to launch businessman Hernando Guerra García as the presidential nominee. A month before the election, Castañeda issued a statement in which he formally retired the party's presidential ticket and congressional lists, fearing the loss of the party registration as Hernando Guerra García polled lower than 1% throughout the entire campaign.

Amid the investigations regarding the Odebrecht case in Peru, Castañeda and National Solidarity were put under scrutiny as the Public Ministry, as the former mayor was banned from leaving the country for the next eight months starting June 2019. Martin Bustamante, a former municipal operator, confessed that Castañeda received over 220,000 dollars from Odebrecht for his 2014 mayoral campaign. Upon the revelations, Castañeda publicly retired temporarily from the Presidency of National Solidarity. In this scenario, former Lima city councilman and long time member of the party, Rafael López Aliaga, was selected as party Secretary-General. Under his leadership, National Solidarity shifted to far right politics, as it publicly embraced extreme social conservatism and ultranationalism.

Under a new political platform, National Solidarity received widespread criticism for its extreme ideological shift to the far right. Participating at the 2020 snap parliamentary election following the dissolution of Congress, López Aliaga announced early in the campaign the inclusion of Rosa Bartra, Yeni Vilcatoma and Nelly Cuadros, three former Fujimorista congresswomen in the party's congressional list for the Lima constituency, in an attempt to attract support from extreme conservative circles against abortion and LGBT rights. At the election, National Solidarity received 1.5% of the popular vote, placing nineteenth out of twenty-one participating lists, thus failing to attain representation.

=== Dissolution ===
Following its poor results in the snap-election, the party underwent a formal reconstruction. During this period, Rafael López Aliaga formally announced his candidacy for the presidency in the 2021 general election, stating that he intends to gather all possible support from the country's conservative circles. Under this new platform, López Aliaga announced the dissolution of National Solidarity, re-founding the party under the name Popular Renewal, in October 2020.

== Election results ==
=== Presidential election ===
Year	Candidate	Party / Coalition	Votes	Percentage	Outcome
2000	Luis Castañeda	National Solidarity	199 813	1.80	5th
2001	Lourdes Flores	National Unity PPC-SN-RN-CR	2 576 653	24.30	3rd
2006	Lourdes Flores	National Unity PPC-SN-RN	2 923 280	23.81	3rd
2011	Luis Castañeda	National Solidarity Alliance SN-C90-TPP-SU-UPP	1 440 143	9.83	5th
2016	Hernando Guerra García	National Solidarity-UPP Electoral Alliance	Ticket withdrawn	N/A	N/A

=== Elections to the Congress of the Republic ===
Year	Votes	%	Seats	▲/▼	Position
2000	399 985	4.0%	5 / 120	▲5	Minority
2001	1 304 037	13.8% as part of National Unity	17 / 120	▼2	Minority
2006	1 648 717	15.3% as part of National Unity	17 / 120	Steady	Minority
2011	1 311 766	10.2% as part of National Solidarity Alliance	9 / 130	▲3	Minority
2016	List withdrawn	N/A	N/A	Steady	N/A
2020	221 123	1.5%	0 / 130	Steady	N/A

=== Regional and municipal elections ===
Year	Gobiernos Regionales	Alcaldías Provinciales	Alcaldías Distritales
Year	Outcome	Outcome	Outcome
2002	0 / 25	13 / 194	143 / 1,635
2006	0 / 25	4 / 195	60 / 1,637
2010	0 / 25	0 / 195	0 / 1,639
2014	0 / 25	2 / 195	25 / 1,647
2018	0 / 25	0 / 196	8 / 1,678
