= Máximo San Román =

Peruvian mechanical engineer, businessman and politician

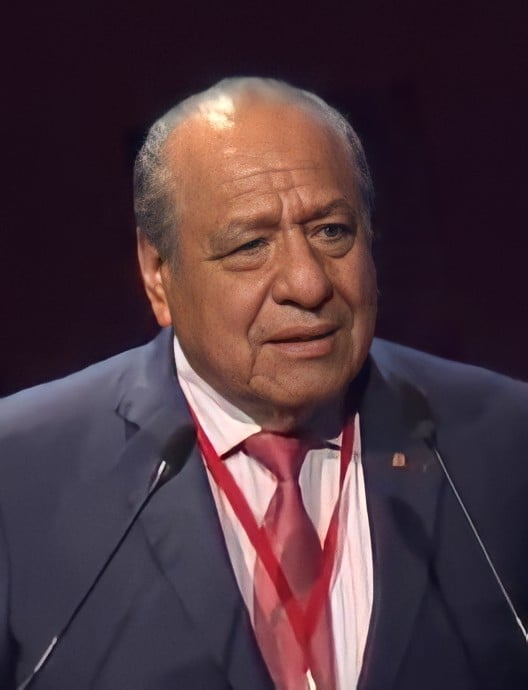
- San Román in 2018

Interim President of Peru Partial recognition (Note: Interim Presidency de jure partially recognized during the 1992 Peruvian self-coup. San Román was sworn into the interim presidency; however, due to the lack of military support, he never assumed the interim presidential powers. Alberto Fujimori, who led the self-coup, continued his presidential powers as the President of the Emergency and National Reconstruction Government.)
- In office 21 April 1992 – 5 January 1993; Disputed with Alberto Fujimori
- Vice President: First Vice President; Vacant; Second Vice President; Vacant
- Preceded by: Carlos García y García (Note: San Román was not in the country at the time of the self-coup on 5 April 1992, nor was he informed about it. Second Vice President Carlos García y García was sworn into the interim presidency during his absence. San Román was sworn into the interim presidency when he had returned to the country.)
- Succeeded by: Alberto Fujimori

First Vice President of Peru
- In office 28 July 1990 – 5 April 1992
- President: Alberto Fujimori
- Preceded by: Luis Alberto Sánchez
- Succeeded by: Ricardo Márquez Flores (Note: Vice presidency was vacated until a new vice president was elected in the 1995 Peruvian general election.)

President of the Senate
- In office 26 July 1990 – 26 July 1991
- Vice President: First Vice President Enrique Bernales; Second Vice President Julián Bustamante
- Preceded by: Humberto Carranza
- Succeeded by: Felipe Osterling

Member of Congress
- In office 26 July 1995 – 26 July 2000
- Constituency: National

Senator of the Republic
- In office 26 July 1990 – 5 April 1992
- Constituency: National

Personal details
- Born: Máximo San Román Cáceres; 14 April 1946 (age 80) Cuzco, Peru
- Party: Contigo (2020-present)
- Other political affiliations: Cambio 90 (1990-1992); National Civic Movement OBRAS (1995-1999); Union for Peru (1999-2001); Independent (2001-2020); National Restoration (non-affiliated / 2006-2011); Alliance for the Great Change (2010-2011)
- Education: National University of Engineering (B.S.)
- Profession: Mechanical engineer

Máximo San Román Cáceres (Spanish pronunciation: [ˈmaɣsimo ˈsan roˈmaŋ ˈkaseɾes]; born 14 April 1946) is a Peruvian mechanical engineer, businessman and former politician. He was President of Peru between 1992 and 1993, a term that was marked by the authoritarian government of Alberto Fujimori. Considered the legal Head of State during Fujimori's ruling by decree of his self-coup, he did not hold real power.

== Biography ==
He was born in the District of Cusipata, Quispicanchi Province, Cusco on 14 April 1946. Son of Julio San Román and María Natividad Cáceres.

He completed his primary studies at the Fiscal School No. 729 in Calca and he attended secondary school at the San José de La Salle School in Cusco.

He entered the National School of Technical Engineering (ex-ENIT) of the National University of Engineering, where he studied mechanical engineering and graduated in 1970.

Upon graduation, he served as a teacher at the Industrial Technology Center of the Ministry of Industry and Commerce.

From 1971 to 1979 he was Production Manager of Industrias Royal SA.

In 1979, San Román founded Industrias S.A., a Metal Mechanic company.

From 1980 to 2016 he was Chairman of the Board of Nova Perú, a machinery company for the food industry.

He was president of the "Association of Small and Medium Industrials of Peru" (APEMIPE), president of the "National Federation of Small and Medium Industry of Peru" (FENAPI), president of the "Guarantee Fund for Small Industry" (FOGAPI ), chairman of the board of the "Promotion Fund for Small Industrial Companies.

== Political career ==
=== Early political career ===
San Román entered politics in 1990 as the first running mate of Alberto Fujimori in the Cambio 90 presidential ticket. He was elected First Vice President of Peru and Senator for the 1990-1995 term. He was sworn as President of the Senate due to the high number of votes he received in the general elections.

=== 1992 self-coup ===
In April 1992, while San Román was visiting the Dominican Republic, Fujimori executed a self-coup, in which he dissolved Congress and closed other public institutions such as the Judiciary and the Attorney General's office. San Román returned to Peru to claim the Presidency. He was sworn as President by the dissolved Congress on 21 April 1992. Although the move was constitutional, Fujimori had all the support and popular approval for the coup, and San Román had no real power to govern. His term is considered to be between the day of his oath of office, 21 April 1992, and the day when the Democratic Constitutional Congress proclaimed Fujimori as Constitutional President.

=== Later political career ===
He was elected to Congress for the 1995–2000 term for Mayor of Lima Ricardo Belmont's Civil Works Movement "OBRAS" party. In 2000, he ran for president under the Union for Peru party, placing last with 36,000 votes. In the 2006 and 2010 regional elections, he ran for Governor of Cuzco losing on both occasions, placing second.

San Román has run for first vice president a total of 4 times. The first was with Alberto Fujimori in 1990 in which the tandem was victorious, the second with Lima Mayor Ricardo Belmont in 1995, the third with pastor Humberto Lay in 2006, and the fourth with Pedro Pablo Kuczynski in 2011. Most recently, he registered in the Contigo Party in order to run for the presidential nomination at the 2021 general election. Following the 2020 Peruvian protests, he announced his withdrawal from the race.
