= 2020 Peruvian parliamentary election =

- 26 January 2020
- All 130 seats in the Congress of Peru; 66 seats needed for a majority
- Turnout: 74.07% (▼7.81pp)
Party	Leader	Vote %	Seats	+/–
Popular Action	Mesías Guevara	10.26	25	+20
Podemos Perú	José Luna	8.38	11	New
FREPAP	Jonás Ataucusi	8.38	15	New
APP	César Acuña	7.96	22	+13
PM	Julio Guzmán	7.40	9	New
FP	Keiko Fujimori	7.31	15	−58
UPP	José Vega	6.77	13	New
Broad Front	Marco Arana	6.16	9	−11
We Are Peru	Patricia Li	6.05	11	+11
This lists parties that won seats. See the complete results below.
Results of the election.

Early parliamentary elections were held in Peru on 26 January 2020. The elections were called after President Martín Vizcarra constitutionally dissolved the Congress of the Republic on 30 September 2019.

All 130 congressmen corresponding to the 26 electoral districts were elected to serve the remainder of the 2016–2021 congressional period. It was the seventh parliamentary election under the 1993 Constitution, which created the unicameral Congress of the Republic.

== Background ==
On 30 September 2019, the President of the Council of Ministers, Salvador del Solar, set forth a vote of confidence before the Congress for refusing to pass a bill that modified the election process of judges of the Constitutional Court. The vote of confidence sought to stop the election of magistrates, modify the Organic Law of the Constitutional Court and the designation of the tribunes. However, the Plenary Session of Congress decided to continue with the election of magistrates, and ignored the vote of confidence presented by Del Solar. President Martín Vizcarra considered this a vote of no confidence in his Cabinet, and proceeded with the dissolution of Congress and the call for new elections according to Article 134 of the constitution:

The President of the Republic is empowered to dissolve the Congress if it has censured or voted down two Councils of Ministers.

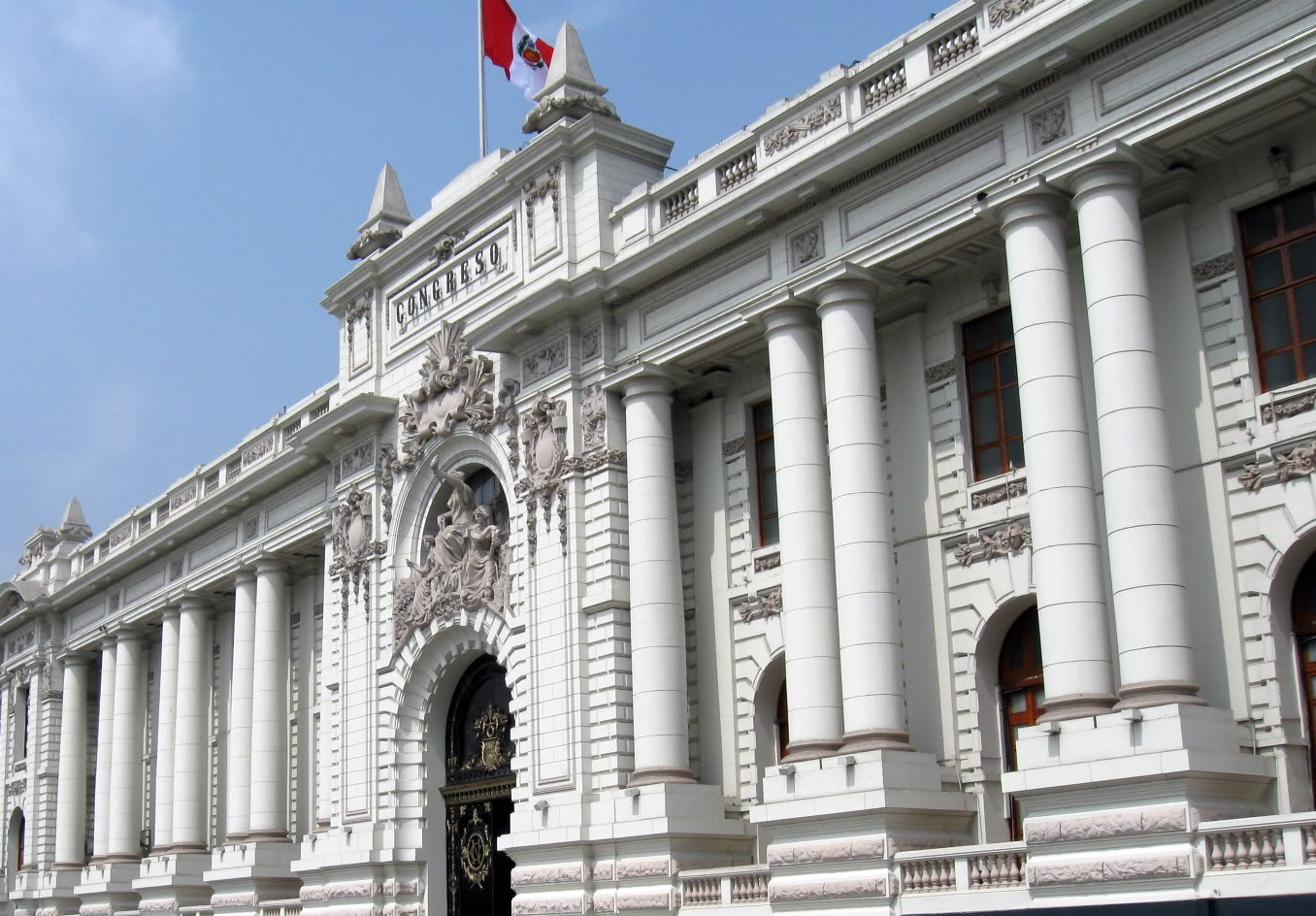
130 members were elected to the Congress of Peru for the remainder of the 2016–2021 term

The decree of dissolution also called for new congressional elections to replace the existing congress. Under the law, elections are to be held within four months of the date of dissolution, without altering the pre-existing electoral system, and the Congress cannot be dissolved in the last year of the congressional term, which would be 2021. Once the Congress is dissolved, the Permanent Congressional Committee, which cannot be dissolved, remains in operation.

== Schedule ==
The schedule of activities of the congressional elections of Peru of 2020:

Electoral schedule
Call for elections	30 September 2019
Sending the list of the initial register by the National Registry of Identification and Civil Status (RENIEC) to the JNE	7 October 2019
The period for party elections begins	11 October 2019
Last day to submit resignations to apply for another political organization	11 October 2019
Last day to register political alliances	31 October 2019
End of the period for party elections	6 November 2019
Approval of the electoral roll	16 November 2019
Deadline for submission of candidate list
Closing of the Registry of political organizations	18 November 2019
Deadline for the publication of accepted lists	3 December 2019
Deadline for exclusion, resignation and withdrawal of candidates	27 December 2019
2020 Congressional election day	26 January 2020

== Electoral system ==
The 130 members of Congress are elected in 26 multi-member constituencies using open list proportional representation. To enter Congress, parties must either cross the 5% electoral threshold at the national level, or win at least seven seats in one constituency. Seats are allocated using the D'Hondt method.

== Opinion polls ==
The following graph shows the weighted polls, and does not include voting simulations

View source data.

=== Voting simulations ===
Pollster	Date	Voters	AP	PP	FREPAP	APP	PM	FP	UPP	FA	PDSP	JPP	PPC	DD	PL	APRA	AvP	PPS	Other	Blank/None
Election results	26 January 2020	N/A	10.3	8.4	8.4	8.0	7.4	7.3	6.8	6.2	6.1	4.8	4.0	3.7	3.4	2.7	2.5	2.4	8	N/A
Ipsos Perú/El Comercio (Valid votes)	15–17 January 2020	1,215	14.8	4.2	4.5	9.9	10.9	11	2.7	4.7	7.6	4	3	3.1	2.6	4.9	2.3	2.1	8.7	N/A
Ipsos Perú/El Comercio (Cast votes)	15–17 January 2020	1,215	8.4	2.4	2.6	5.6	6.2	6.3	1.5	2.7	4.3	2.3	1.7	1.8	1.5	2.8	1.3	1.2	4.3	43.1

=== Electoral polls ===
Pollster	Date	Respondents	AP	PP	FREPAP	APP	PM	FP	UPP	FA	PDSP	JPP	PPC	DD	PL	APRA	Other	Blank/None	Undecided
2020 parliamentary election	26 January 2020	N/A	10.3	8.4	8.4	8.0	7.4	7.3	6.8	6.2	6.1	4.8	4.0	3.7	3.4	2.7	12.9	N/A	N/A
Ipsos Perú/El Comercio	15–17 January 2020	1,218	10	2	2	5	6	5	1	3	3	3	2	1	1	3	5	31	15
Ipsos Perú/El Comercio	11–13 December 2019	1,209	11	1	1	4	4	8	1	3	3	1	2	1	1	2	5	34	17
IEP/La República	7–10 December 2019	1,215	10.1	0.5	1	4.3	4.1	6.8	0.4	2.1	2.7	0.7	1.6	1.1	0.4	3.2	6.1	21.6	33.2
IEP/La República	16–20 November 2019	1,248	9	0.5	0.9	3.1	5.2	5.1	0.7	2.3	2.5	0.5	1.1	0.9	1	2	5.4	24.5	35.8
Ipsos Perú/El Comercio	13–15 November 2019	1,199	10	1	2	6	5	9	1	2	1	2	2	1	1	3	10	32	14
IEP/La República	19–22 October 2019	1,215	10	1	1	3	3	5	1	2	2	1	2	1	1	2	5	22	37
Ipsos Perú/El Comercio	9–11 October 2019	1,203	9	1	2	5	5	8	1	5	1	1	2	1	1	3	3	35	15

== Results ==
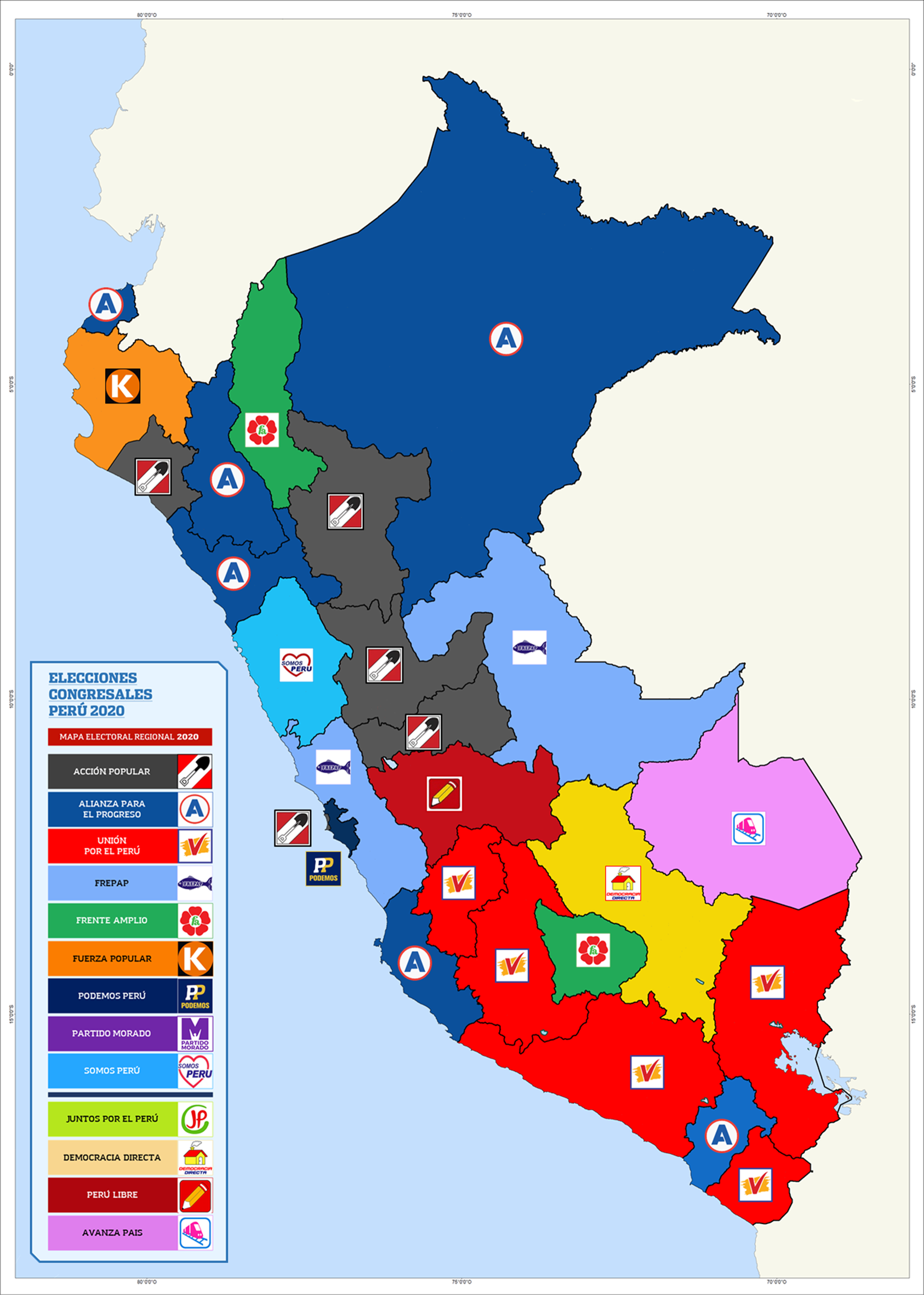
Party that received the most votes by region

The election was the most divided in Peruvian history, with no party receiving more than 11% of the vote. The Fujimorist Popular Force, the largest party in the previous legislature, lost most of its seats, and the American Popular Revolutionary Alliance (APRA) had its worst ever election result, failing to win a seat for the first time since before the 1963 elections. Popular Action emerged as the largest party with 25 seats. New or previously minor parties such as Podemos Perú, the Purple Party and the Agricultural People's Front had good results. Contigo, the successor to former president Pedro Pablo Kuczynski's Peruvians for Change party, failed to win a seat and received only around 1% of the vote. The result was seen as representative of public support for president Martín Vizcarra's anti-corruption reform proposals.

Party	Votes	%	Seats	+/–
Popular Action	1,518,171	10.26	25	+20
Podemos Perú	1,240,716	8.38	11	New
Agricultural People's Front of Peru	1,240,084	8.38	15	New
Alliance for Progress	1,178,020	7.96	22	(Note: Part of the Alliance for the Progress of Peru coalition in the 2016 general election)
Purple Party	1,095,491	7.40	9	New
Popular Force	1,081,174	7.31	15	–58
Union for Peru	1,001,716	6.77	13	New
Broad Front	911,701	6.16	9	–11
We Are Peru	895,700	6.05	11	
Together for Peru	710,462	4.80	0	New
Christian People's Party	590,378	3.99	0	0
Direct Democracy	543,956	3.68	0	0
Free Peru	502,898	3.40	0	New
Peruvian Aprista Party	402,330	2.72	0	–5
Avanza País	373,113	2.52	0	New
Peru Secure Homeland	350,121	2.37	0	New
Let's Go Peru	311,413	2.10	0	New
National United Renaissance	265,564	1.79	0	New
National Solidarity	221,123	1.49	0	New
Peru Nation	206,128	1.39	0	New
Contigo	158,120	1.07	0	New
Total	14,798,379	100.00	130	0
Valid votes	14,798,379	80.56		
Invalid/blank votes	3,570,709	19.44		
Total votes	18,369,088	100.00		
Registered voters/turnout	24,799,384	74.07		
Source: JNE, JNE
