= Hacer País =

Political party in Peru

Make Country Hacer País
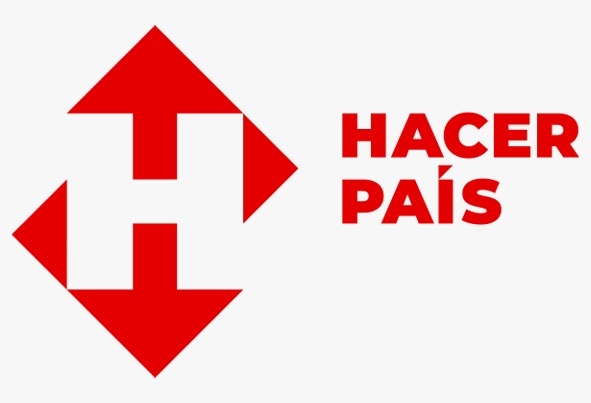
- Founded: December 2019
- Dissolved: 2022
- Headquarters: Lima
- Ideology: Progressivism; Social democracy
- Political position: Centre-left
- Colors: Red White

Website
- https://hacerpais.pe

Make Country (Spanish: Hacer País) was a progressive Peruvian political party. Founded in December 2019, the organization was in the process of being registered as a political party to formally participate in the 2021 general election, but was not able to complete the process and ceased to exist.
