= Opinion polling for the 2021 Peruvian general election =

Opinion polling for the Peruvian General election, 2021

Since the previous elections in 2016, polling companies have published surveys tracking voting intention for the 2021 Peruvian general election. The results of these surveys are listed below in reverse chronological order. The first round of the election was held on 11 April, and the run-off between Keiko Fujimori and Pedro Castillo was held on 6 June 2021.

== Analysis ==
The primary candidates in Peruvian elections typically become apparent two months prior to elections. In the first wave of support, Yonhy Lescano saw initial support, though he was surpassed by Rafael López Aliaga, a far-right businessman whose speech was similar to Catholic extremism. López Aliaga's support waned following his poor debate performance, leading to neoliberal economist and advisor to Alberto Fujimori, Hernando de Soto, receiving additional support from the recently emerged middle class, though critics believed de Soto would continue Fujimori's controversial policies.

Two weeks before the election, Keiko Fujimori, who was initially discounted due to corruption allegations and brief imprisonment, became among the most popular among poll respondents following her performance in debates. However, during the election silence period that prevented the publishing of opinion polls, Pedro Castillo saw a dramatic jump in approval, though this support was not permitted to be documented.

== Presidential election (run-off) ==
The following graph shows the weighted polls and does not count voting simulations

=== Voting simulations ===
Pollster	Date	Sample size	Pedro Castillo	Keiko Fujimori	Blank / None
Election results	6 June 2021	N/A	50.13	49.87	N/A
Ipsos Perú/El Comercio (Valid votes)	28 May 2021	1,517	51.1	48.9	N/A
Ipsos Perú/El Comercio (Cast votes)	28 May 2021	1,517	45.1	43.1	11.8
CIT/Expreso (Valid votes)	27–28 May 2021	2,400	49.3	50.7	N/A
CIT/Expreso (Cast votes)	27–28 May 2021	2,400	40.6	41.7	17.7
CPI/América (Valid votes)	26–28 May 2021	1,400	50.5	49.5	N/A
CPI/América (Cast votes)	26–28 May 2021	1,400	41.0	40.2	18.8
Datum/Gestión/Perú 21 (Valid votes)	25–27 May 2021	1,201	50.5	49.5	N/A
Datum/Gestión/Perú 21 (Cast votes)	25–27 May 2021	1,201	42.6	41.7	15.7
CIT/Expreso (Valid votes)	21–22 May 2021	1,600	51.1	48.9	N/A
CIT/Expreso (Cast votes)	21–22 May 2021	1,600	41.9	40.0	18.1
Ipsos Perú/El Comercio (Valid votes)	21 May 2021	1,200	52.6	47.4	N/A
Ipsos Perú/El Comercio (Cast votes)	21 May 2021	1,200	45.0	40.7	14.3
Datum/Gestión/Perú 21 (Valid votes)	18–20 May 2021	1,201	53.2	46.8	N/A
Datum/Gestión/Perú 21 (Cast votes)	18–20 May 2021	1,201	45.5	40.1	14.4
Ipsos Perú/El Comercio (Valid votes)	13–14 May 2021	1,205	51.1	48.9	N/A
Ipsos Perú/El Comercio (Cast votes)	13–14 May 2021	1,205	43.6	41.7	14.7
Datum/Gestión/Perú 21 (Valid votes)	12–13 May 2021	1,201	51	49	N/A
Datum/Gestión/Perú 21 (Cast votes)	12–13 May 2021	1,201	44	41	15

=== Electoral polls ===
Pollster	Date	Sample size	Pedro Castillo	Keiko Fujimori	Blank / None	Undecided
Election results	6 June 2021	N/A	50.1	49.9		
Ipsos	5 June 2021	5,117	44.1	44.8	11.1	
IEP	2–4 June 2021	2,057	40.8	40.9	11.5	6.8
IDICE/La Razón	28–29 May 2021	1,200	43.9	47.8	6.0	2.3
Ipsos Perú/El Comercio	28 May 2021	1,526	42	40	10	8
IEP/La Republica	27–28 May 2021	1,227	40.3	38.3	13.0	8.3
Datum/Gestión/Perú 21	25–27 May 2021	1,201	41.6	41.5	10.9	6.0
IEP/La Republica	20–21 May 2021	1,208	44.8	34.4	12.8	5.8
Datum/Gestión/Perú 21	18–20 May 2021	1,201	44.9	40.1	9.2	5.8
IDICE/La Razón	18–19 May 2021	1,200	42.0	45.4	7.7	4.9
IEP/La Republica	13–15 May 2021	1,246	36.5	29.6	23.6	10.3
Ipsos Perú/El Comercio	13–14 May 2021	1,205	40	37	14	19
CPI/América	12–14 May 2021	1,600	34.2	32.0	18.0	15.0
Datum/Gestión/Perú 21	12–13 May 2021	1,201	42	40	11	7
CIT/Expreso	7–8 May 2021	2,400	38.2	37.3	12.6	11.9
CPI/RPP	6–8 May 2021	1,600	34.2	32.0	18.5	15.3
IEP/La Republica	3–6 May 2021	1,367	36.2	30.0	21.3	12.4
Datum/Gestión/Perú 21	5–6 May 2021	1,203	41	36	11	12
CIT/Expreso	28–30 April 2021	1,600	37.6	34.5	8.8	19.1
Ipsos Perú/América	30 April 2021	1,204	43	34	13	10
Datum/Gestión/Perú 21	27–29 April 2021	1,200	44	34	11	11
IDICE/La Razón	22–23 April 2021	1,200	41.3	34.8	11.7	12.2
CPI/Panamericana	18–21 April 2021	1,200	35.5	23.1	23.7	17.7
IEP/La Republica	17–21 April 2021	1,367	41.5	21.5	23.5	13.5
Datum/Gestión/Perú 21	16–20 April 2021	1,205	41	26	15	18
Ipsos Perú/América	15–16 April 2021	1,204	42	31	16	11

== Presidential election (first round) ==
The following graph shows the weighted polls, and does not include voting simulations.

=== Voting simulations ===
Pollster	Date	Sample size	Pedro Castillo	Keiko Fujimori	Rafael López Aliaga	Hernando de Soto AvP	Yonhy Lescano	Verónika Mendoza	César Acuña	George Forsyth	Daniel Urresti	Julio Guzmán	Alberto Beingolea	Daniel Salaverry	Ollanta Humala	José Vega	Ciro Gálvez	Marco Arana	Rafael Santos	Andrés Alcántara	Blank / None
Election results	11 April 2021	N/A	18.9	13.4	11.8	11.6	9.1	7.9	6.0	5.7	5.6	2.3	2.0	1.7	1.6	0.7	0.6	0.5	0.4	0.4	N/A
CPI/Latina (Valid votes)	30 March–1 April 2021	1,600	9	11.5	10.2	11.4	16.2	10.6	7	9.9	4.2	2	3.6	2	0.8	0.2	0.2	0.5	0.5	0.0	N/A
CPI/Latina (Cast votes)	30 March–1 April 2021	1,600	6.2	7.9	7	7.8	11.1	7.3	4.8	6.8	2.9	1.4	2.5	1.4	0.6	0.1	0.2	0.3	0.3	0.0	31.5
Ipsos Perú/El Comercio (Valid votes)	31 March 2021	1,526	7.9	11.2	8.2	13.9	14.7	12.4	4.2	11.9	4.7	1.8	2.7	1.5	1.9	1	0.1	0.8	0.7	0.4	N/A
Ipsos Perú/El Comercio (Cast votes)	31 March 2021	1,526	6.5	9.3	6.8	11.5	12.1	10.2	3.5	9.8	3.9	1.4	2.2	1.3	1.6	0.8	0.1	0.7	0.6	0.4	17.3
CIT/Expreso (Valid votes)	30 March–1 April 2021	1,600	3.4	9.8	17	12.9	11.9	7.7	7.7	10.4	6.7	2.1	1.4	3.1	1.9	0.6	0.7	0.3	1.9	0.5	N/A
CIT/Expreso (Cast votes)	30 March–1 April 2021	1,600	2.7	7.7	13.4	10.2	9.4	6.1	6.1	8.2	5.3	1.7	1.1	2.4	1.5	0.4	0.6	0.3	1.5	0.4	21
Datum/Perú 21/Gestión (Valid votes)	27–29 March 2021	1,206	5.9	12.6	11.4	10.3	19.1	9	3.9	11.8	5.6	2.4	1.4	1.4	1.3	1.3	0.4	0.7	1.2	0.3	N/A
Datum/Perú 21/Gestión (Cast votes)	27–29 March 2021	1,206	3.7	7.9	7.2	6.5	12.1	5.7	2.5	7.4	3.5	1.5	0.9	0.9	0.9	0.8	0.3	0.4	0.7	0.2	36.9
CIT/Expreso (Valid votes)	18–22 March 2021	1,600	2.9	9.7	17	9.7	15.6	6.8	6.8	12.8	5.8	3.5	0.8	3.8	1.1	1.7	0.9	0.4	0.3	0.4	N/A
CIT/Expreso (Cast votes)	18–22 March 2021	1,600	2.4	8.1	14	8.1	13	5.6	5.9	10.7	4.8	2.9	0.6	3.2	0.9	0.6	0.8	0.2	1.4	0.3	16.5
Ipsos Perú/El Comercio (Valid votes)	10–11 March 2021	1,206	3.7	10.6	11.6	5.9	21	10.4	3.3	13.9	6.4	3.8	1.5	2.3	2.8	0.4	0.4	0.9	0.8	0.3	N/A
Ipsos Perú/El Comercio (Cast votes)	10–11 March 2021	1,206	3	8.6	9.3	4.8	16.8	8.4	2.6	11.2	5.1	3.1	1.2	1.9	2.2	0.3	0.3	0.7	0.7	0.2	19.6

=== Electoral polls ===
Pollster	Date	Sample size	Pedro Castillo	Keiko Fujimori	Rafael López Aliaga	Hernando de Soto AvP	Yonhy Lescano	Verónika Mendoza	César Acuña	George Forsyth	Daniel Urresti	Julio Guzmán	Alberto Beingolea	Daniel Salaverry	Ollanta Humala	Other	Blank / None	Undecided
Election results	11 April 2021	N/A	18.9	13.4	11.8	11.7	9.1	7.9	6.0	5.7	5.6	2.3	2.0	1.7	1.6	2.6	N/A	N/A
IEP/La República (Note: Answer with card/options.)	1–2 April 2021	1,212	6.6	9.8	8.4	9.8	8.2	7.3	4.1	5.7	3.5	2.3	2	1.4	1.4	1.8	18.3	9.3
IDICE/La Razón	1–2 April 2021	1,200	4.4	7.8	7.2	8	10.8	7.3	7.4	7.3	3.5	1.9	3.3	1	1.6	4	16.7	8.6
Ipsos Perú/El Comercio	31 March 2021	1,505	6	8	6	9	10	9	4	8	5	2	2	2	2	2	11	14
IEP/La República	22–25 March 2021	1,212	4.3	7.9	9.7	8.5	11.4	9.6	3.2	8.2	4.3	1.1	0.7	1.2	2	1.2	20.2	6.3
IDICE/La Razón	23–25 March 2021	1,200	4.3	7.9	10	6.9	10.8	5.9	8.9	7.6	3.8	1.9	0.4	1.6	1.9	1.8	13.4	13.8
CPI/Exitosa	19–23 March 2021	1,600	4.3	7.1	5.2	4.5	11	5.4	4	8.1	3.8	2	1	1	2.1	0.5	15.2	24.8
Datum/Perú 21/Gestión	18–21 March 2021	1,201	3	8	9	5	14	6	3	8	5	2	1	2	2	1	14	17
Radio Latina	17–19 March 2021	22,700	6	6.5	9.5	7	8	5	4	6.5	4	2	1	1	2	4.5	12	21
IDICE/La Razón	16–18 March 2021	1,200	3.9	7.2	11.4	5.4	11.3	6	7.1	6.8	3.4	2.3	0.7	1	1.7	1.3	11.9	18.8
CELAG	23 February–16 March 2021	2,006	5	7	5.1	8.6	15.6	11.2	3	13.1	1.3	5	-	1.5	4.4	6.9	5	7.4
CPI/Latina	6–11 March 2021	1,300	2.5	6.5	7.2	4.5	12.2	5.9	4	8	3.8	2	1.2	1	1.5	1	15.6	23.2
Ipsos Perú/El Comercio	10–11 March 2021	1,206	3	7	8	4	15	6	2	10	5	3	1	1	2	6	15	12
IEP/La República	4–8 March 2021	1,220	3.5	7.2	9.5	5.7	13.9	7	3.4	6.8	4.5	2.3	0.9	1.2	2.5	1.1	20.1	10.5
CIT/Expreso	4–7 March 2021	1,220	1	5.1	12	8	7.1	8.6	5	5.7	8.6	2.6	0.9	2.6	1.6	3.5	27.6	N/A
Datum/Perú 21/Gestión	5–7 March 2021	1,200	2	7	7	5	13	6	3	7	4	3	1	2	1	2	16	21
IDICE/La Razón	3–5 March 2021	1,200	1.3	8.9	10.8	3.3	9.4	8.4	5.7	7.2	5	4.3	1.4	1	1.7	4.3	10	18.7
IEP/La República	19–23 February 2021	1,220	2.4	8.1	7.6	4.2	11.3	8.9	3.8	8.1	4.8	3.1	0.6	2.4	2.2	2	2.5	28.1
CPI/Correo	17-19 February 2021	1,200	1.7	6.4	3	2.9	8	4.7	3.1	8.9	4.7	2.4	0.7	2.6	1	2	18.8	30.1
CIT/Expreso	12-14 February 2021	1,220	0.4	7.6	7.6	5.4	5.6	5	2.3	8.7	7	1.6	1	2	1.6	4	21.9	18.3
Datum/Perú 21/Gestión	9–12 February 2021	1,200	1	8	3	4	9	7	4	11	6	3	2	2	3	4	15	18
Ipsos Perú/El Comercio	10–11 February 2021	1,219	2	8	3	4	10	8	3	11	7	4	1	3	2	5	15	14
IDICE/La Razón	9–11 February 2021	1,200	1	9.2	6.8	4	4.9	8.4	4.6	14.1	5.5	5.7	1.2	3.9	1.9	1.2	8.4	19.3
IEP/La República	21–27 January 2021	1,205	2.3	6.7	2.4	5.6	7.1	8.2	2	13.3	5.6	4.6	1.7	2.5	2.8	2.4	25.2	7.5
IEP/La República (Note: Spontaneous response.)	21–27 January 2021	1,205	0.5	2.9	1.2	2.5	3.1	2.8	0.4	6.5	1.8	1.5	0.1	1	0.9	0.3	31.9	42.5
CPI/Correo	23–25 January 2021	1,200	2.4	5.6	1.1	2.8	5	4.7	3.7	10.1	4.3	4.1	1.1	3.2	1.6	1.5	19.3	30.5
Ipsos Perú/El Comercio	13–15 January 2021	1,210	1	8	0.5	5	6	7	4	17	6	7	1	4	4	5	14	11
Datum/Perú 21/Gestión	8–12 January 2021	1,206	1	6	0.5	3	4	5	3	13	3	5	1	2	2	3	30	19
CIT/Expreso	11–13 January 2021	1,200	0.5	8.1	5.1	9.6	4.6	7.2	4.3	11.8	7.8	5	-	3.3	3.8	3.5	11.5	13.9
IDICE/La Razón	2–8 January 2021	1,200	1	8.8	4.6	4.4	3.6	7.9	3.2	14.7	6.6	7.8	-	5.2	2.3	1.7	5.8	22.1
Ipsos Perú/El Comercio	10–11 December 2020	1,200	1	7	0.3	3	4	7	2	18	6	8	2	3	2	9	18	10
IEP/La República	1–8 December 2020	1,225	0.8	7.7	0.2	4.1	4.5	9.1	2	14.7	6.3	9.1	1.1	3.1	2.9	5	24.1	5.3
IEP/La República	1–8 December 2020	1,225	0.2	2.3	0.2	1.7	1.6	2.4	0.3	5.5	1.2	5.2	0.2	0.8	0.6	15.3	22.5	39.6
CIT/Expreso	11-13 December 2020	1,200	0.2	7.5	2.3	10.4	3.2	6.4	3.7	9.8	7.7	5.2	-	1.9	2	12.7	13.3	14
Datum/Perú 21/Gestión	3–6 December 2020	1,244	0.3	4	0.4	5	4	4	2	10	3	4	0.7	2	1	4	32	24
CPI/Correo	23–25 November 2020	1,200	1.2	4.2	0.2	2.9	2.3	3.4	1.1	8.1	2.8	5	0.7	1.1	1.3	4.7	37.7	23.3
Ipsos Perú/El Comercio	16 November 2020	1,207	2	5	0.1	4	3	6	3	16	6	7	2	1	2	8	18	17
CIT/Expreso	20-22 November 2020	1,200	-	6.8	2	11.3	2.9	5.8	4.8	12.5	7.8	5.1	-	0.8	1.4	14.3	-	24.8
Ipsos Perú/El Comercio	21–23 October 2020	1,193	-	7	0.3	3	3	5	4	19	7	5	1	2	2	12	14	16
IEP/La República	13–19 October 2020	1,212	-	8	0.4	5.4	4.9	9.1	3.9	23	7.3	3.9	-	2	2.7	3.1	21.1	5.5
IEP/La República	13–19 October 2020	1,212	-	2.6	0.1	1.9	1	1.8	0.8	9.6	2.3	1	-	0.2	0.2	16.8 (Note: The poll includes Martín Vizcarra (President of Peru) as a candidate. However, he is not allowed to contest the election because an immediate re-election is forbidden in Peru. An intention to vote for him is included here under "Other".) (Note: The poll includes Antauro Humala as a candidate. However, he is not allowed to contest the election because of his detention for homicide. An intention to vote for him is included here under "Other".)	23.2	38.6
Datum/Perú 21/Gestión	2–5 October 2020	1,224	-	5	0.2	5	3	4	1	20	4	3	-	-	-	12	25	18
CIT/Expreso	14-16 October 2020	1,025	-	8.5	0.9	14.6	1.5	2	4.4	11	5	2.2	-	0.8	-	16.3	-	32.9
Ipsos Perú/El Comercio	9–10 September 2020	1,204	-	7	0.2	2	3	4	3	23	9	4	1	1	1	10	19	13
CIT/Expreso	9-11 September 2020	1,025	-	-	1	16.8	-	1.2	2.4	9.3	3.4	1.2	-	1.2	-	34.5	-	27.8
Ipsos Perú/El Comercio	21–22 August 2020	1,010	-	7	-	-	3	6	2	25	10	4	2	1	1	5	31	3

=== Pre-electoral polls ===
Pollster	Date	Sample size	George Forsyth	Salvador del Solar	Daniel Urresti	Keiko Fujimori	Verónika Mendoza	Julio Guzmán	Alfredo Barnechea	Yonhy Lescano	César Acuña	Kenji Fujimori	Jorge Muñoz	Daniel Salaverry	Alberto Beingolea	~~Alan García~~	Other	Blank / None	Undecided
Ipsos Perú/El Comercio	9–10 July 2020	1,019	23	14	9	6	5	3	4	-	2	-	-	-	1	N/A	1	28	4
Ipsos Perú/El Comercio	11–12 June 2020	1,015	23	11	12	7	2	3	3	-	2	-	-	-	1	N/A	8	26	2
Ipsos Perú/El Comercio	14–15 May 2020	1,022	23	16	11	4	3	3	3	-	2	-	3	-	1	N/A	2	26	3
Ipsos Perú/El Comercio	15–16 April 2020	1,055	22	17	11	4	2	3	3	3	3	-	7	-	1	N/A	9	20	3
Ipsos Perú/El Comercio	11–12 March 2020	1,173	10	12	10	7	4	4	2	4	4	-	4	-	1	N/A	3	34	1
Datum/Perú 21/Gestión	29 February–3 March 2020	1,210	11	15	5	5	6	4	5	-	4	-	-	-	-	N/A	6	29	10
Ipsos Perú/El Comercio	11–13 February 2020	1,190	9	11	11	7	3	3	2	-	3	-	3	-	1	N/A	10	34	3
Ipsos Perú/El Comercio	15–17 January 2020	1,218	10	13	-	9	5	6	2	-	6	-	3	-	1	N/A	7	35	3
Datum/Perú 21/Gestión	11–13 January 2020	1,208	9	19	-	6	7	7	5	-	4	-	-	-	1	N/A	6	20	16
Ipsos Perú/El Comercio	11–13 December 2019	1,209	13	13	-	10	6	6	2	-	4	-	4	2	-	N/A	7	30	3
Datum/Perú 21/Gestión	30 November–3 December 2019	1,204	9	16	-	8	4	8	3	-	5	-	-	0.4	1	N/A	10.6	26	11
Ipsos Perú/El Comercio	13–15 November 2019	1,199	13	15	-	10	4	6	2	-	4	-	4	3	-	N/A	9	28	2
Datum/Perú 21/Gestión	1–4 November 2019	1,224	9	18	-	6	4	9	2	-	4	-	-	1	1	N/A	8	26	14
Ipsos Perú/El Comercio	9–11 October 2019	1,203	11	16	-	8	5	5	1	-	4	-	5	2	2	N/A	10	29	2
Datum/Perú 21/Gestión	5–7 October 2019	1,212	9	21	-	5	7	9	2	-	3	-	-	1	0.5	N/A	6.5	22	14
Ipsos Perú/El Comercio	11–13 September 2019	1,208	14	5	7	4	7	-	-	4	8	-	7	2	-	N/A	13	28	1
Datum/Perú 21/Gestión	30 August–2 September 2019	1,221	7	5	-	7	6	8	4	-	4	-	-	-	1	N/A	8	35	15
IEP/La República	17–21 August 2019	1,224	14	3	2	9	7	11	4	0.4	4	3	-	-	0.3	N/A	9.3	28	5
IEP/La República	17–21 August 2019	1,224	10	1.5	0.4	8	5	9	3	0.4	3	3	-	-	-	N/A	6.7	35	15
Ipsos Perú/El Comercio	14–15 August 2019	1,205	13	6	3	10	5	8	2	-	4	-	6	3	-	N/A	10	28	2
Datum/Perú 21/Gestión	2–4 August 2019	1,219	10	4	-	5	6	11	5	-	3	-	4	-	1	N/A	10	29	12
Ipsos Perú/El Comercio	17–19 July 2019	1,221	13	6	-	9	3	4	2	-	4	-	5	2	-	N/A	16	33	3
Ipsos Perú/El Comercio	12–14 June 2019	1,210	12	5	-	9	4	4	2	-	4	-	4	2	-	N/A	21	31	2
Ipsos Perú/El Comercio	15–17 May 2019	1,222	18	4	-	9	4	5	2	-	3	-	4	-	-	N/A	20	30	1
Ipsos Perú/El Comercio	10–12 April 2019	1,212	17	4	-	8	4	6	2	-	3	-	5	-	-	4	17	32	2
Ipsos Perú/El Comercio	13–15 March 2019	1,218	13	-	-	9	5	8	3	-	3	-	7	-	-	4	16	31	1
Ipsos Perú/El Comercio	13–15 February 2019	1,199	-	-	-	11	8	7	4	-	3	-	-	-	-	4	24	48	1
Ipsos Perú/El Comercio	16–18 January 2019	1,213	-	2	-	9	6	8	4	-	4	-	-	-	-	4	18	44	1
Ipsos Perú/El Comercio	12–14 December 2018	1,316	-	2	-	10	7	9	5	-	3	-	-	-	-	3	16	44	1
Ipsos Perú/El Comercio	14–16 November 2018	1,284	-	3	-	11	8	8	5	-	4	-	-	-	-	3	21	35	2
Ipsos Perú/El Comercio	10–11 October 2018	1,253	-	4	-	10	7	10	5	-	6	-	-	-	-	5	17	34	2
Ipsos Perú/El Comercio	15–16 August 2018	1,266	-	3	-	13	8	11	5	-	4	-	-	-	-	5	14	35	2
CPI/Exitosa	3–7 August 2018	1,400	-	-	-	8.4	6.4	12.5	6.8	-	3.9	1.4	-	-	-	1.5	8.5	43.8	6.8
Ipsos Perú/El Comercio	11–13 July 2018	1,278	-	3	-	17	8	12	6	-	4	-	-	-	-	4	17	26	3
CPI/Exitosa	1–5 July 2018	1,400	-	-	-	11.9	6.3	10.8	7.4	-	4.2	2.5	-	-	-	1.4	7.8	40.0	7.7
Ipsos Perú/El Comercio	6–8 June 2018	1,290	-	2	-	15	8	12	5	-	6	5	-	-	-	3	12	31	1
CPI/Exitosa	19–23 May 2018	1,400	-	-	-	14.8	6.1	12.3	7.5	-	3.9	2.3	-	-	-	2.7	8.1	35.6	6.7
Ipsos Perú/El Comercio	9–11 May 2018	1,279	-	4	-	18	6	9	5	-	4	4	-	-	-	5	14	30	1
Ipsos Perú/El Comercio	10–12 April 2018	1,289	-	-	-	15	11	14	8	-	6	5	-	-	-	3	8	25	5
CPI/Exitosa	27–31 March 2018	1,400	-	-	-	15.8	6.0	13.1	9.8	-	4.9	5.8	-	-	-	1.4	7.3	29.6	6.3
Ipsos Perú/El Comercio	7–9 March 2018	1,264	-	-	-	17	9	16	6	-	3	10	-	-	-	2	7	25	5
Ipsos Perú/El Comercio	7–9 February 2018	1,263	-	-	-	21	8	13	5	-	4	11	-	-	-	3	6	17	12
CPI/Exitosa	4–9 February 2018	1,500	-	-	-	21.3	6.8	11.5	6.3	-	4.6	10.4	-	-	-	2.4	6.9	24.8	5.0
Ipsos Perú/El Comercio	10–12 January 2018	1,271	-	-	-	20	8	13	5	-	5	12	-	-	-	3	6	25	3
Datum/Perú 21/Gestión	5–9 January 2018	1,200	-	-	-	24	8	15	8	-	2	-	-	-	-	3	4	26	10
Ipsos Perú/El Comercio	13–15 December 2017	1,287	-	-	-	27	9	10	5	-	3	7	-	-	-	3	6	27	3

== Congressional election ==
The following graph shows the weighted polls, and does not include voting simulations.

=== Voting simulations ===
Pollster	Date	Sample size	PL	FP	RP	AP	APP	AvP AvP	JPP	PDSP	PP	PM	VN	FREPAP FREPAP	UPP	PPC	PNP	FA	DD	RUNA	PPS	Contigo	Blank / None
Election results	11 April 2021	N/A	13.4	11.3	9.3	9.0	7.5	7.5	6.6	6.1	5.8	5.4	5.0	4.6	2.1	1.7	1.5	1.1	0.8	0.8	0.4	0.1	N/A
CPI/Latina (Valid votes)	30 March–1 April 2021	1,600	7	8.4	5.7	17.8	6.1	6.4	7.8	8	3.7	5.2	5.7	9.3	2.2	2.1	1.4	1.4	0.6	0.6	0.5	0.0	N/A
CPI/Latina (Cast votes)	30 March–1 April 2021	1,600	3.9	4.7	3.2	10	3.4	3.6	4.4	4.5	2.1	2.9	3.2	5.2	1.2	1	0.8	0.8	0.4	0.5	0.3	0.0	43.9
Ipsos Perú/El Comercio (Valid votes)	31 March 2021	1,526	5.9	10.5	6	13.2	5.5	9.3	9.3	5.9	5.2	5.7	8.3	5	1.7	1.9	1.4	1.4	0.8	0.2	0.3	0.0	N/A
Ipsos Perú/El Comercio (Cast votes)	31 March 2021	1,526	4.1	7.2	4.1	10.7	3.8	6.4	6.4	4.1	3.6	3.9	5.7	3.4	1.2	1.3	0.9	1	0.6	0.1	0.2	0.0	31.4
CIT/Expreso (Valid votes)	30 March–1 April 2021	1,600	4	7.9	10.8	13.3	6.5	9.3	6.3	8.9	5.3	6.7	9.7	3.6	0.7	1.4	2.4	0.9	0.6	0.6	1.1	0.0	N/A
CIT/Expreso (Cast votes)	30 March–1 April 2021	1,600	2	4	5.4	6.7	3.3	4.7	3.2	4.5	2.7	3.4	4.9	1.8	0.4	0.7	1.2	0.4	0.3	0.3	0.6	0.0	49.6
Datum/Perú 21/Gestión (Valid votes)	27–29 March 2021	1,206	4.2	12.1	7.8	18.6	5.8	5.9	9.5	6.5	6.9	6.2	7.1	1.6	2	1.5	0.7	1.3	0.4	0.6	0.5	0.0	N/A
Datum/Perú 21/Gestión (Cast votes)	27–29 March 2021	1,206	1.8	5.2	3.3	8	2.5	2.5	4.4	2.8	2.9	2.6	3	0.7	0.9	0.6	0.3	0.5	0.2	0.2	0.2	0.0	57.3
Ipsos Perú/El Comercio (Valid votes)	10–11 March 2021	1,206	3.1	8.8	9.5	20.8	4.4	3.7	6.2	7.4	6.7	5.3	9.9	6.3	0.8	2.3	1.6	1.9	0.4	0.2	0.7	0.0	N/A
Ipsos Perú/El Comercio (Cast votes)	10–11 March 2021	1,206	1.9	5.6	6	13.2	2.8	2.4	3.9	4.7	4.3	3.3	6.3	4	0.5	1.5	1	1.2	0.3	0.1	0.5	0.0	36.5

=== Electoral polls ===
Pollster	Date	Sample size	PL	FP	RP	AP	APP	AvP AvP	JPP	PDSP	PP	PM	VN	FREPAP FREPAP	PPC	PNP	FA	Other	Blank / None	Undecided
Election results	11 April 2021	N/A	13.4	11.3	9.3	9.0	7.5	7.5	6.6	6.1	5.8	5.4	5.0	4.6	1.7	1.5	1.1	4.1	N/A	N/A
IEP/La República	1–2 April 2021	1,215	3.9	6.4	5.2	9.1	5	5.2	4	6.7	3.8	5.5	3.3	6.5	1.9	1	0.9	2.3	22.7	6.5
Ipsos Perú/El Comercio	31 March 2021	1,206	4	9	4	11	4	6	7	5	4	4	6	4	2	2	1	2	10	15
IEP/La República	22–25 March 2021	1,220	2.4	7.2	5.7	13.5	4.3	5.4	5.5	10.4	4.4	4.6	4	7.5	1.7	0.3	1.5	2.7	11.9	7
Datum/Perú 21/Gestión	18–21 March 2021	1,201	1	6	5	14	5	2	5	7	4	5	4	8	1	1	1	5	9	17
CPI/Latina	6–11 March 2021	1,300	2.7	4.7	2.4	8.6	3.2	1.3	3.6	8	2.3	2.1	2.9	6.6	1	1	1.2	1.3	19.5	28.7
Ipsos Perú/El Comercio	10–11 March 2021	1,206	2	6	5	15	4	3	4	6	4	4	6	5	2	2	2	4	13	13
IEP/La República	4–8 March 2021	1,220	1.8	7.6	6	13.2	5.5	3.3	4.2	8.4	3.8	5.5	2.6	7	1	0.5	2	4.9	0.8	23.7
Datum/Perú 21/Gestión	5–7 March 2021	1,200	1	5	4	11	2	3	3	6	3	6	2	8	1	1	1	6	11	26
IDICE/La Razón	3–5 March 2021	1,200	1.8	9.6	6.2	9.8	8.6	3	3.8	4.8	3	3.4	4.4	7.8	1	1.1	1.2	1.5	8.2	20.7
IEP/La República	19–23 February 2021	1,220	2.1	5.5	3.5	12.5	3.9	3.6	4	9.5	4.7	8.4	2	8.3	1.7	1.5	1.2	4.2	1.1	22.3
CPI/Correo	17–19 February 2021	1,200	0.6	4.8	1	4.7	2.5	1.2	2.7	4.4	2.5	2.4	3.3	2.2	0.8	0.6	0.5	1	20.6	44.2
Datum/Perú 21/Gestión	9–12 February 2021	1,200	1.2	6	1.2	15	5	1.1	3	5	3	7	1.5	6	2	0.8	1	9.9	10	24
Ipsos Perú/El Comercio	10–11 February 2021	1,219	2	8	2	9	5	3	5	7	4	7	3	5	2	1	1	4	14	18
IEP/La República	21–27 January 2021	1,205	0.5	2.5	0.8	3.3	1.6	0.9	1	4.9	1.9	5.7	0.9	2.4	0.6	0.7	0.3	2.3	30.2	39.8
CPI/Correo	21–25 January 2021	1,200	0.3	3.7	0.4	4.6	2.3	1.6	3	5.5	3	3.6	2.6	4.1	0.7	0.7	0.8	3.4	22.3	38.6
Ipsos Perú/El Comercio	13–15 January 2021	1,210	1	7	1	9	5	2	5	5	2	8	4	4	2	2	2	7	14	20
Datum/Perú 21/Gestión	8–12 January 2021	1,206	0.9	6	1	11	3	1	1	5	2	7	0.5	4	0.5	0.6	2	3.5	25	26
Ipsos Perú/El Comercio	10–11 December 2020	1,200	1	6	1	8	3	2	4	3	1	12	6	5	2	1	2	10	16	17
IEP/La República	1–8 December 2020	1,225	0.3	3.3	0.2	4.1	1.4	0.3	0.8	8.3	1.2	12.9	0.8	2.9	0.7	0.1	0.8	4.1	24.8	33
