= Jaime Salomón =

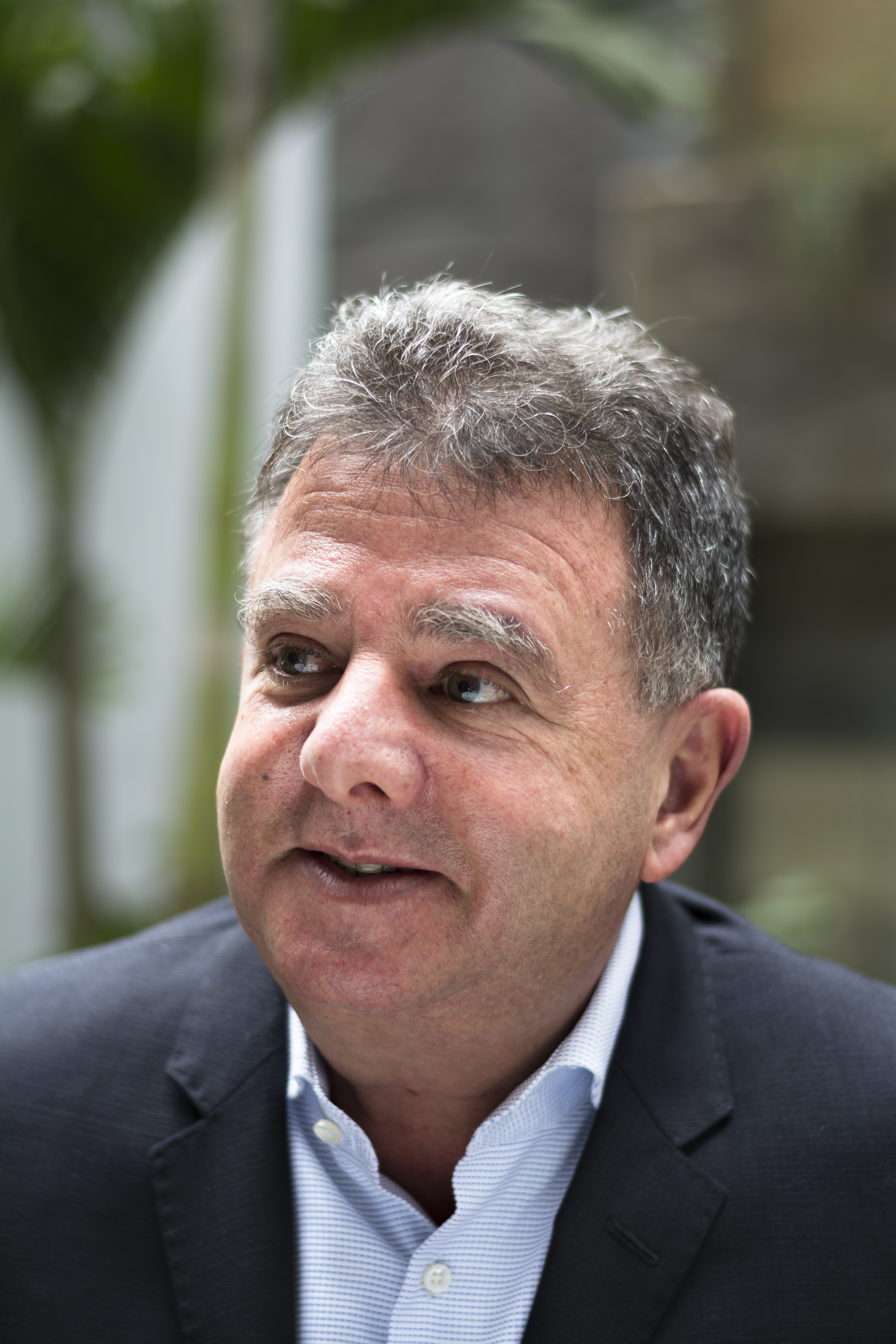
Jaime Salomon (2018)

Jaime Oswaldo Salomón Salomón (Lima, November 17, 1963) is a Peruvian industrial engineer, business administrator and politician. He was Vice Minister of Agricultural Development and Irrigation during the government of Pedro Pablo Kuczynski (2017–2018).

== Political career ==
His political career began in the 2016 general elections, where Salomón ran for the Andean Parliament for Peruanos Por el Kambio. However, he was only elected as an alternate after only obtaining 137,782 votes.

=== Vice Minister of Agricultural Development and Irrigation (2017–2018) ===
On May 23, 2017, he was appointed as Vice Minister of Agricultural Development and Irrigation during the government of Pedro Pablo Kuczynski. He remained in the position until February 2018.

=== Candidate for the 2nd Vice-Presidency in 2021 ===
For the 2021 general elections, Salomón was announced as a candidate for the 2nd Vice-Presidency of the Republic on Hernando de Soto's presidential ticket for Avanza País. However, the candidacy was unsuccessful in those elections.
