= 2021 Peruvian general election =

- Presidential election
- 11 April 2021 (first round); 6 June 2021 (second round)
- Opinion polls
- Turnout: 70.05% (first round) ▼11.75pp 74.57% (second round) ▼5.52pp
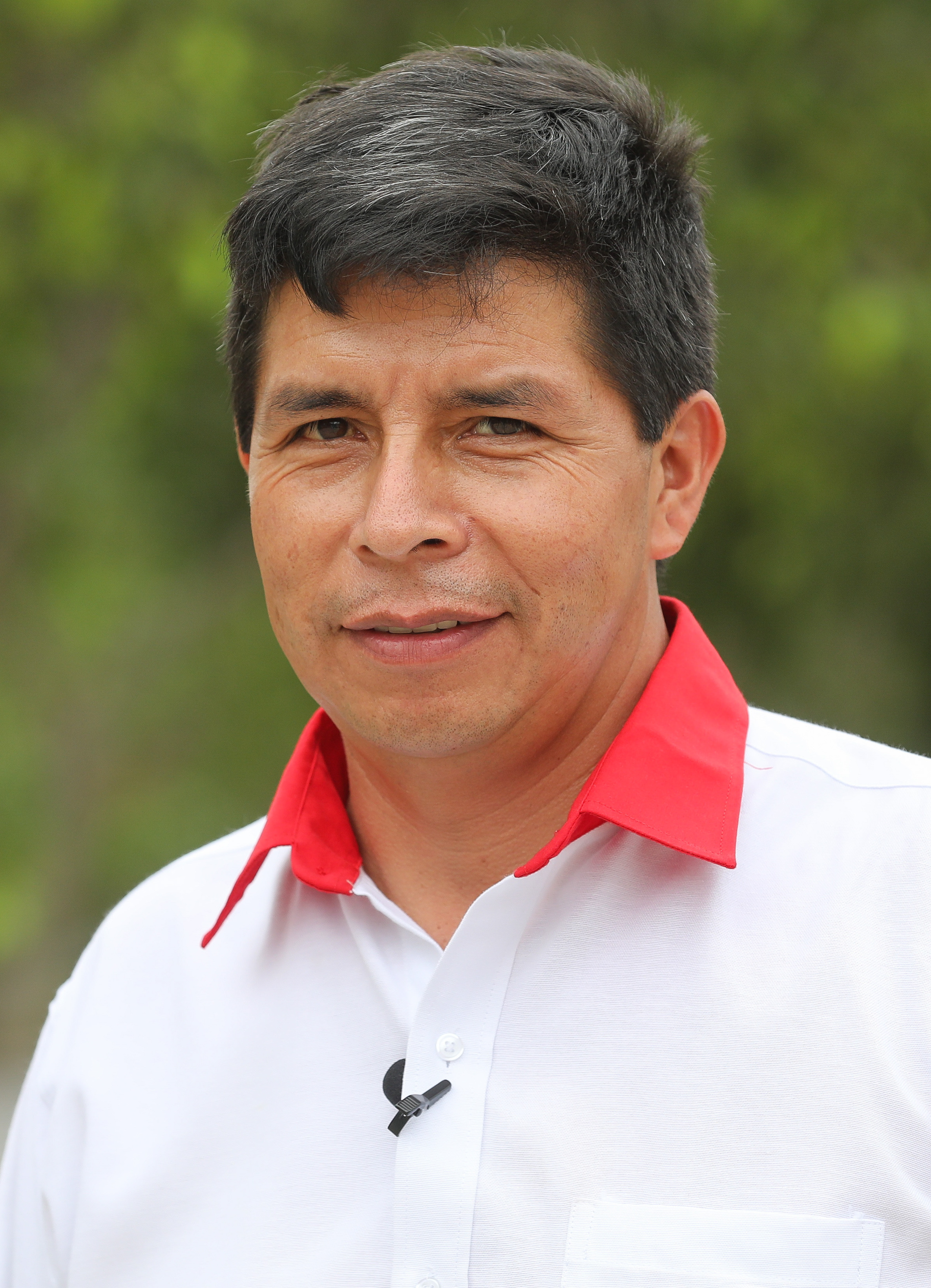

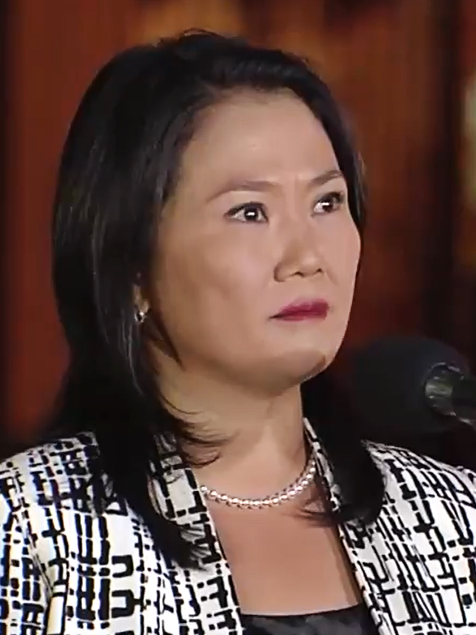
Nominee	Pedro Castillo	Keiko Fujimori
Party	PL	FP
Running mate	Dina Boluarte; Vladimir Cerrón (Note: Excluded from campaign after being deemed ineligible by the National Jury of Elections due to Cerrón's conviction on corruption charges.)	Luis Galarreta; Patricia Juárez
Popular vote	8,836,380	8,792,117
Percentage	50.13%	49.87%
- Second round results by department (left) and province (right)
President before election
Francisco Sagasti
PM
Elected President
Pedro Castillo
PL
- Congressional election
- 11 April 2021
- All 130 seats in the Congress of Peru; 66 seats needed for a majority
Party	Leader	Vote %	Seats	+/–
PL	Vladimir Cerrón	13.41	37	+37
FP	Keiko Fujimori	11.34	24	+9
RP	Rafael López Aliaga	9.33	13	+13
Popular Action	Mesías Guevara	9.02	16	−9
APP	César Acuña	7.54	15	−7
Avanza País	Pedro Cenas	7.54	7	+7
JP	Roberto Sánchez	6.59	5	+5
We Are Peru	Patricia Li	6.13	5	−6
Podemos Perú	José Luna	5.83	5	−6
PM	Julio Guzmán	5.42	3	−6
This lists parties that won seats. See the complete results below.
Results of the Congressional election

General elections were held in Peru on 11 April 2021. The presidential election, which determined the president and the vice presidents, required a run-off between the two top candidates, which was held on 6 June. The congressional elections determined the composition of the Congress of Peru, with all 130 seats contested.

Pedro Castillo, a member of the left-wing Free Peru party, received the most votes in the first round. In the second round he faced Keiko Fujimori, the leader of the right-wing populist Popular Force who had previously lost the run-offs of the 2011 and the 2016 elections. Both candidates were surprise contenders; Fujimori had initially been discounted due to her preventive imprisonment for a year, while Castillo was a political newcomer who was previously unknown to the public.

The official count of the second round by the National Office of Electoral Processes indicated that Castillo had won with 50.13% of the vote, a lead of 44,263 over Fujimori. However, the declaration of an official outcome certifying the result by the National Jury of Elections was delayed following accusations of electoral fraud by opposition politicians. Castillo was ultimately named president-elect by the National Jury of Elections on 19 July, and was inaugurated on 28 July. The opposition gained control of Congress.

== Electoral system ==
=== Presidential election ===
The President of Peru is elected using the two-round system. The first round voting was held on 11 April and allows eligible voters to vote for any viable presidential candidate. The top two candidates who receive a plurality of the vote proceed to the run-off election, which took place on 6 June. The winner of the run-off election and the presidential election is the candidate who receives a plurality of the popular vote. However, if in the first round the candidate who is in the first place already gets more than 50% of the popular vote, that candidate will automatically win the election and a run-off election will no longer be needed.

=== Congressional elections ===
The 130 members of Congress are elected in 27 multi-member constituencies using open list proportional representation. To enter Congress, parties must either cross the 5% electoral threshold at the national level, or win at least seven seats in one constituency. Seats are allocated using the D'Hondt method.

=== Andean parliament ===
Peru has five places in the Andean Parliament, elected using a common constituency by open-list.

== Date ==
=== Early election proposal ===
President Martín Vizcarra initially presented legislation that would set the conditions for a snap election in 2020. If successful, Vizcarra would not be eligible for re-election. The 2020 proposed Peruvian general election would be held on 11 April 2020, to elect a new President of the Republic of Peru, along with 130 congressmen of the Congress of Peru. It was eventually decided to be held on 26 January 2020. Opposition lawmakers condemned Vizcarra's proposal, defending the practice of five-year terms. This constitutional reform was rejected.

=== Official election date ===
The 2021 Peruvian general election were held on 11 April 2021, to elect the president of the Republic of Peru, two vice presidents of the same party, 130 congressmen of the Congress of Peru and 5 Andean parliamentarians for a five-year term from 2021 to 2026.

On 11 April, 130 congressmen were elected in 27 electoral districts, corresponding to the 24 departments, the Province of Lima, the Constitutional Province of Callao and residents living abroad.

The elected congressmen were to be sworn in and assume office no later than 27 July 2021; the constitutional president of the Republic and his elected vice presidents were scheduled to do so on 28 July 2021.

== Presidential nominations ==
=== Main presidential nominees ===
Presidential tickets
Avanza País	Popular Force	Popular Action	Together for Peru	Podemos Perú
Hernando de Soto	Keiko Fujimori	Yonhy Lescano	Verónika Mendoza	Daniel Urresti
President of the Institute Liberty and Democracy (1979–present)	Member of Congress; From Lima (2006–2011)	Member of Congress; From Puno / Lima (2001–2019)	Member of Congress; From Cuzco (2011–2016)	Member of Congress; From Lima (2020–2021)
Running mates
1st: Corinne Flores; 2nd: Jaime Salomón	1st: Luis Galarreta; 2nd: Patricia Juárez	1st: Gisela Tipe; 2nd: Luis Alberto Velarde	1st: José Antonio de Echave; 2nd: Luzmila Ayay	1st: María Teresa Cabrera; 2nd: Wilbert Portugal
Alliance for Progress	Free Peru	Purple Party	Popular Renewal	We Are Peru
César Acuña	Pedro Castillo	Julio Guzmán	Rafael López Aliaga	Daniel Salaverry
Mayor of Trujillo (2007-2014)	Schoolteacher, union organizer from Cajamarca (1995–present)	Secretary General of the Office of the Prime Minister (2012–2013)	Lima City Councilman (2007–2010)	Member of Congress; From La Libertad (2016–2019)
Running mates
1st: Carmen Omonte; 2nd: Luis Iberico	1st: Dina Boluarte; 2nd: Vladimir Cerrón	1st: Flor Pablo; 2nd: Francisco Sagasti	1st: Neldy Mendoza; 2nd: Jorge Montoya	1st: Matilde Fernández; 2nd: Jorge Pérez Flores

- Pedro Castillo is Free Peru's nominee and schoolteacher from Cajamarca. He is a former Ronda Campesina that defended rural areas from the Shining Path in the 1980s, and a politician with the centre-left party Possible Peru from 2002 to 2017. Castillo gained attention in 2017, as he led multiple teacher strikes in five regions against Pedro Pablo Kuczynski's administration. Controversy arose after he participated in a campaign of several virtual meeting with MOVADEF members. Castillo has called for the renegotiation of government contracts with large businesses and to rewrite the constitution to protect Peruvians from foreign control.
- Keiko Fujimori is the leader of the conservative and far-right Popular Force. The daughter of former president Alberto Fujimori, she still remains a polarizing figure in Peruvian politics since her last presidential run in 2016, but with lower support due to her parliamentary caucus's obstructionist role during the presidencies of Pedro Pablo Kuczynski and Martín Vizcarra. She continues to be viewed unfavorably by a number of people who oppose Fujimori for human rights abuses and corrupt practices, mostly from the left-wing spectrum, and who fear that her victory would mark a return of Fujimorism. In addition, she has been involved in the Odebrecht scandal, for which she has served in pretrial detention since 2018 with conditional release in 2020. Among her first campaign appearances, she has vowed to pardon her father if winning the presidency in her third run.
- Yonhy Lescano is Popular Action's (AP) nominee. Serving in the Peruvian Congress from 2001 to 2019 representing the constituency of Puno then, Lima, he attained the nomination under a left-wing platform in a competitive primary against the more moderate Alfredo Barnechea. His support is based in the highlands, more punctually in Puno and surrounding rural areas. He opposed several times to the decisions of his party, as when Congress was dissolved in 2019, he supported Martín Vizcarra's measure and did not attend to the inauguration of Vice President Mercedes Araoz. His party was politically affected after Vizcarra's impeachment and the sudden rise to power of party member Manuel Merino, who held the position only for five days and promptly resigning after the a series of protests.
- Verónika Mendoza is Together for Peru's (JPP) nominee and leader of the democratic socialist New Peru movement. Since she could not register her own party on time for the election, she sealed a political accord with JPP for her presidential run. Her left-wing platform has remained controversial since her first presidential stint in 2016, in which she placed third and was key in Pedro Pablo Kuczynski's run-off victory by endorsing him to prevent Keiko Fujimori to win. She previously served in the Peruvian Congress from 2011 to 2016, representing the constituency of Cuzco.
- Rafael López Aliaga is the leader of Popular Renewal. A businessman with no relevant political experience, he gained political traction due to his ultraconservative rhetoric, adding to his self-proclamation as "the Peruvian Bolsonaro" due to his religious views and far-right policies similar to the Brazilian president. His campaign runs under a fully right wing platform opposed to abortion and same-sex marriage. His collaboration with Fujimorists and the Popular Force party of Keiko Fujimori has also been documented. During the campaign his businesses were accused of having a large debt with the SUNAT and of not paying personal debts to the state.
- Hernando de Soto is Avanza País's nominee. A free-market economist specialized in informal economy and on the importance of business and property rights, he was a main advisor for President Alberto Fujimori, assisting him with establishing macroeconomic stability for Peru in the aftermath of the Lost Decade. In addition, he has served as an economic advisor to world-leaders since the foundation of the Institute for Liberty and Democracy (ILD), an economic development think-tank based in Lima. In the public sector, he briefly served as a member of the board of directors of the Central Reserve Bank of Peru, in 1979. In previous elections, he supported Keiko Fujimori's candidacies, serving as one of her advisors. His party has been described as a mere electoral vehicle by analysts due to his technical profile.
- Julio Guzmán is the founder and leader of the Purple Party. A former public administrator, he first ran for the presidency in 2016 for All for Peru, but was disqualified due to irregularities in the nomination process. His party is currently in government with Francisco Sagasti as President of Peru following the removal of Martín Vizcarra and resignation of Manuel Merino, which has affected negatively his campaign due to the government's management of the COVID-19 pandemic in Peru. In addition, a scandal involving him escaping from a fire in an apartment during a lunch with a supposed mistress revealed in early 2020 further damaged his public image.
- Daniel Urresti is a former army general who first attained popularity as Interior Minister in the presidency of Ollanta Humala. Elected to the Peruvian Congress with the highest-vote count in 2020 with Podemos Perú, he attained the party's presidential nomination as the only candidate. He previously ran for the presidency for Peruvian Nationalist Party in 2016, although the party withdrew his ticket from the race, and placed second for mayor of Lima at the 2018 municipal election with Podemos Perú. He is currently under investigation for the murder of a journalist during his years in the Peruvian Army, which has proved negative to his campaign, in addition to his wry media exposure from years prior to Congress.
- Daniel Salaverry is We Are Peru's nominee. An architect from La Libertad, he started a career in politics for mayor of Trujillo with the Peruvian Aprista Party in 2010, and Popular Force in 2014. With the latter, he was elected to the Peruvian Congress in 2016. As a member of the majority caucus, he was elected President of Congress in 2018, but quit the caucus as he supposedly received pressure from the Fujimorist leadership to undermine Martín Vizcarra's presidency. As part of his campaign, Vizcarra remains his main political asset for his presidential run due to the former president's congressional candidacy for the constituency of Lima. As of 2021 he had an open investigation in the Public Ministry after being accused of falsifying his reports during his tenure as congressman.
- César Acuña is the founder and leader of Alliance for Progress. An entrepreneur in the field of education, he entered politics in 2000 when elected to the Peruvian Congress, in which he served until 2006. Subsequently, he served as mayor of Trujillo from 2007 to 2014, and as governor of La Libertad in 2015. He initially ran for the presidency in the 2016, but was disqualified for alleged vote buying in a campaign trail. In addition, his popularity has diminished due to his party's recent voting records in Congress, thus contradicting his campaign rhetoric, although at first leading the congressional polling after impressively attaining the second largest number of seats at the 2020 parliamentary election.

=== Minor presidential nominees ===
Presidential tickets
National Victory	Christian People's Party	Peruvian Nationalist Party	Union for Peru	Broad Front
George Forsyth	Alberto Beingolea	Ollanta Humala	José Vega	Marco Arana
Mayor of La Victoria (2019–2020)	Member of Congress; From Lima (2011–2016)	President of Peru (2011–2016)	Member of Congress; From Lima (2006-2011 / 2020–2021)	Member of Congress; From Cajamarca (2016-2019)
Running mates
1st: Patricia Arévalo; 2nd: Jorge Chávez Álvarez	1st: Lucía Ledesma Martínez; 2nd: David Vera Trujillo	1st: Ana María Salinas; 2nd: Alberto Otárola	1st: Haydeé Andrade; 2nd: Daniel Barragán	1st: Leyla Berrocal; 2nd: Magno Ortega

- George Forsyth is a former football player who played as goalkeeper throughout his sports career. The son of diplomat Harold Forsyth, he entered politics as councilman of La Victoria District in 2010, and as the district's mayor from 2019 until his resignation in October 2020 to run for the presidency. Previously not-affiliated to party politics, he reached an agreement with National Restoration for his presidential run. Upon his registration, the party filed a name-change to be reorganized into National Victory for the general election. During his campaign, he was accused of having offered a position to one of his friends in La Victoria District with an excessive remunerations; the Public Ministry opened an investigation of the situation.
- Ollanta Humala is the leader of the Peruvian Nationalist Party and the only former President of Peru running for a second non-consecutive term. A former army lieutenant colonel, he remained unpopular throughout his presidency due to the few advances his government made, despite its economic stability, in addition to serving a short pre-trial detention from 2017 to 2018 for allegedly receiving bribes from Odebrecht, for which he continues to be under investigation alongside his wife, Nadine Heredia.
- Alberto Beingolea is the leader of the centre-right Christian People's Party. He previously served in the Peruvian Congress from 2011 to 2016. Prior to entering politics, he had a successful career as a sports journalist. Most recently, he ran for mayor of Lima in the 2018 municipal election, in which he placed fourth.
- Marco Arana is the leader of the Broad Front, a left-wing informal coalition of parties and unions. A former bishop from Cajamarca, he ran unsuccessfully for the vice presidency in 2016 with Verónika Mendoza as the party's presidential nominee. He served in the Peruvian Congress from 2016 to 2019.
- Rafael Santos is Peru Secure Homeland's nominee. A businessman in the agrarian exportation area, he entered politics when he successfully ran for mayor of Pueblo Libre in 2006. He was reelected in 2010, but failed to attain a third term in 2014. He was previously a member of the Christian People's Party.
- José Vega is the leader of Union for Peru. A congressman for the constituency of Lima, he further radicalized his party following his accord with the imprisoned military revolt leader, Antauro Humala, the brother of former president Ollanta Humala. He previously served a full term in the Peruvian Congress from 2006 to 2011.
- Ciro Gálvez is the leader of the National United Renaissance. A lawyer and notary based in Junín, his platform remains conservative, declaring to be in opposition to LGBT rights. For the election, his ticket includes former pastor and businessman Claudio Zolla as his first running-mate, due to a political accord with the New Peru Liberal Party, a libertarian movement led by Zolla.
- Andrés Alcántara is the leader of Direct Democracy. A left-wing populist, he presides the FONAVI housing pensioners association, for which he campaigned strongly since early 2000s until 2010 for the government's full pension devolution, which was achieved following via referendum. His campaign platform is poised in reforming and eventually replacing the Constitution of Peru. He ran for the vice presidency in the last three general elections.

=== Withdrawn nominees ===
Party	Ticket			Withdrawal	
Name	for President	for First Vice President	for Second Vice President	Date	Motive
Peruvian Aprista Party; Partido Aprista Peruano	Nidia Vílchez Yucra	Iván Hidalgo Romero	Olga Cribilleros Shigihara	16 January 2021	Prompted upon the National Jury of Elections' rejection of inscription of parliamentary lists past the deadline.

=== Rejected nominees ===
Party	Ticket			Rejection	
Name	for President	for First Vice President	for Second Vice President	Date	Motive
Contigo Political Party; Partido Político Contigo	Pedro Angulo Arana	Casimira Mujica	Alexander von Ehren	22 December 2020	Did not meet the deadline to register for the election on time.
Peru Nation; Perú Nación	Francisco Diez Canseco	Nancy Cáceres	Manuel Salazar	22 December 2020	Did not meet the deadline to register for the election on time.
Front of Hope 2021; Frente de la Esperanza 2021	Fernando Olivera	Elizabeth León	Carlos Cuaresma	24 December 2020	Party did not fulfill requirements for registration to participate.
All for Peru; Todos por el Perú	Fernando Cillóniz	Blanca Wong	Jaime Freundt	26 December 2020	Party lacked the legitimacy to participate in the election due to unsolved internal legal disputes.

=== Disqualified nominees ===
Party	Ticket			Rejection	
Name	for President	for First Vice President	for Second Vice President	Date	Motive
Union for Peru; Unión por el Perú	José Vega	Haydee Andrade	Daniel Barragán	29 December 2020	Incomplete information regarding income on the nominees registration form. The decision was ultimately revoked by the National Jury of Elections, thus admitting and registering the ticket on 6 February 2021.
Alliance for Progress; Alianza para el Progreso	César Acuña	Carmen Omonte	Luis Iberico Núñez	8 January 2021	Incomplete information regarding the presidential nominee's income in registration form. Disqualification revoked by the National Jury of Elections on 22 January 2021, following an appeal.
We Can Peru; Podemos Peru	Daniel Urresti	Maria Teresa Cabrera	Wilbert Portugal	4 February 2021	Unanswered questions about the internal democracy of the party. Disqualifiation revoked by the National Jury of Elections on 18 February 2021, following an appeal.
National Victory; Victoria Nacional	George Forsyth	Patricia Arévalo	Jorge Chávez Álvarez	10 February 2021	Incomplete information regarding income on the nominees registration form. Disqualification revoked by the National Jury of Elections on 5 March 2021, following an appeal.
Popular Renewal; Renovación Popular	Rafael López Aliaga	Neldy Mendoza	Jorge Montoya	25 February 2021	Nominee's public statement on donating his salary to charity if elected president is presumed as alleged vote buying. Disqualification revoked by the National Jury of Elections on 5 March 2021, following an appeal.
National United Renaissance; Renacimiento Unido Nacional	Ciro Gálvez	Sonia García	Claudio Zolla	25 February 2021	Incomplete information regarding the presidential nominee's income in registration form. Disqualification revoked by the National Jury of Elections on 5 March 2021, following an appeal.

== Campaign ==
=== Campaign issues ===
==== Constitution of 1993 ====
Multiple candidates called for constitutional reform or an entirely new Constitution of Peru to reduce corruption and to bring more prosperity to Peru. Constitutional changes in Peru are overseen by the Congress of Peru. To hold a constitutional referendum, a majority vote from congress is required to approve the election. All proposed constitutional reforms would also have to be approved by congress. Following the first round elections and the divided legislators from numerous different parties voted into Congress, chances of candidates changing the constitution were limited.

Corruption in Peru has been pervasive and was recently brought to attention during the Odebrecht scandal, which involved Odebrecht paying politicians to receive contracts for public works projects. In 2019, BBC News wrote that "Peru is perhaps where [Odebrecht] has caused the most severe crisis" and that "[t]he scandal has discredited virtually the entire political elite of the country, as all major parties and players have been implicated." The Odebrecht scandal led to several incidents in Peruvian politics; the suicide of former president Alan García, the order for the arrest of former president Alejandro Toledo as well as the first impeachment process against Pedro Pablo Kuczynski and his resignation from the presidency. Two candidates in the 2021 elections, Keiko Fujimori and Julio Guzmán, were also under investigation regarding alleged bribes from Odebrecht during their earlier electoral campaigns. Kuczynski's successor Martín Vizcarra reacted to the Odebrecht scandal with multiple anti-corruption initiatives, although the removal of Vizcarra was controversial for his own alleged involvement in corruption and was replaced with President of Congress Manuel Merino. Vizcarra's removal was very unfavorable with Peruvians and resulted with the 2020 Peruvian protests. Merino would be president for only five days and would later be replaced by Francisco Sagasti following a vote from congress.

Pedro Castillo proposed to elect a constituent assembly to replace the 1993 constitution from Alberto Fujimori's regime, with Castillo saying "it serves to defend corruption at macro scale" and that he would respect the rule of law by calling for a constitutional referendum to determine whether a constituent assembly should be formed or not. Castillo also proposed judges and justices of the Constitutional Tribunal to be publicly elected.

Verónika Mendoza embraced calls for a new constitution instead of amendments, stating: "Our current national institutional framework, enshrined in the Constitution, establishes that education, health care, and housing are for-profit enterprises, and that life itself is a commodity to be bought and sold. What this means is that political power is concentrated in the hands of those with money, and not with the Peruvian people."

George Forsyth, the initial frontrunner in the campaign, benefitted from his celebrity fame and not being involved with the traditional political parties being investigated for corruption. Forsyth called for constitutional amendments instead of a new constitution, supporting an amendment that would declare corruption a crime against humanity. One of the few candidates to support the existing constitution was Keiko Fujimori, who has stated that she would keep the 1993 constitution of her father Alberto Fujimori in place, instead advocating for the use of a "heavy hand" if elected president, stating: "Democracy cannot be weak. It must be supported by a solid principle of authority."

==== COVID-19 pandemic ====
Peru is one of the worst-affected nations in the world from the COVID-19 pandemic, with at least 0.5% of the total population and nearly 1% of Lima dying leading up to the election. The crisis became so intense by January 2021 due to a second wave of infections that ICU bed occupancy in Peru rose to 90%, with medical workers beginning to participate in strikes due to their harsh work conditions. Due to the intensity of the pandemic, the election became less of a priority for voters and many remained undecided or refused to vote outright.

Forsyth criticized the COVID-19 lockdowns of the Peruvian government, saying that they caused economic distress and that the National Emergency Operations Center (COEN) should be activated for a civil-military partnership to combat further infection. Mendoza was also critical of how lockdowns were initiated, saying that the government should provide support for families affected by lockdowns, promoted a partnership with Argentina to acquire the Oxford–AstraZeneca COVID-19 vaccine and denounced the potential commercialization of the COVID-19 vaccine in Peru.

On 24 February 2021, following an approach to advise Francisco Sagasti on the COVID-19 pandemic management in Peru, Hernando de Soto announced the first shadow cabinet in Peruvian history. Mainly composed of his campaign technical team, the main purpose of the opposition cabinet is to offer an alternative for the government to concur and apply De Soto's proposals during the crisis.

==== Economy ====
As a result of the COVID-19 pandemic, Peru's gross domestic product fell 30.2 percent in the second quarter of 2020, the largest decline of all major economies, with many small service businesses that represent the majority of businesses of Peru's economy going bankrupt during the crisis. Medical experts commented that the severity of the COVID-19 outbreak in Peru can be explained at least in part due to existing socioeconomic circumstances; nearly one-third of Peruvians lived in overcrowded homes, 72% had informal jobs requiring daily work and many needed to travel daily to markets to purchase food since only 49% of households own refrigerators or freezers; even in urban areas it is only 61%.

Political scientist Paula Muñoz of the Universidad del Pacífico described Forsyth as "a pro-business guy", while Americas Quarterly wrote "his views on big economic issues are less clear." Forsyth and Fujimori both shared his support for the privatization of public utilities and the deregulation of the economy, with the two saying that government intervention hinders growth. Fujimori also stated that she wanted to make "the State the main partner of entrepreneurs." In contrast, Mendoza criticized the neoliberal policies instituted in Peru since the 1990s, demanded "the decommodification of goods like health, education, and housing", and promoted the government funding of sustainable agricultural and energy projects, all while protecting the environment.

==== Immigration ====
As a result of the Venezuelan refugee crisis, Peru was home to over one million Venezuelans in February 2021. At that time, the Peruvian Armed Forces were deployed in a joint operation with Ecuadorian counterparts to the Ecuador-Peru border to prevent the entry of illegal migrants, with the armed forces stating that it was to prevent further introduction of COVID-19 in Peru. Human rights organizations criticized the militarization of the border, saying that they are not properly trained for border enforcement and that it violates the human rights of migrants. Xenophobia towards Venezuelans in Peru has also increased, as some politicians have blamed increased crime on the migrants, although the Brookings Institution and Migration Policy Institute found that Venezuelan participate in less crime in Peru than native Peruvians.

On the immigration topic, George Forsyth's responses varied; he stated that "Peru is a generous country that opens its doors to foreigners" while he also supported deploying more authorities to control the border, stating that migrants "have humiliated our National Police" and "We need the principle of authority in the country. ... We need an empowered police to defend all of us Peruvians." Regarding her position on immigration, Mendoza stated: "Migration must be considered on humanitarian criteria. Peruvians have also migrated." Although some controls should be instituted to prevent criminals from entering, she promoted migrants as "people who can contribute to the country." Keiko Fujimori supported increased border security, promoting the use of police and the Peruvian Armed Forces for guarding the border.

Leftist candidate Pedro Castillo called on Maduro to take Venezuelan refugees back to their native country, saying that Venezuelans arrived in Peru "to commit crimes." Castillo described the Venezuelan refugee crisis as an issue of "human trafficking", and said that he would give Venezuelans who commit crimes seventy-two hours to leave Peru.

=== San Miguel del Ene attack ===
Comrade Vilma, with close ties to Comrade José, head of the Militarized Communist Party of Peru (MPCP), a communist organization that split from Shining Path at least ten years before the San Miguel del Ene attack, called for a boycott of elections on 14 May. During the second round of elections, Vilma called on voters not to vote for Fujimori, stating that anyone who voted for her would be the "accomplice of genociders and the corrupt."

On 23 May, a mass killing of eighteen people occurred in San Miguel del Ene, a rural area in the Vizcatán del Ene District of Satipo Province. Along with the corpses, some of which were burned, leaflets reportedly signed by the MPCP were found, featuring the hammer and sickle and defining the attack as a social cleansing operation. The leaflets also called for a boycott of the 6 June elections and accused those who voted for Keiko Fujimori and her Popular Force party of treason. The military quickly accused Shining Path of the attack, although they were allegedly referring to the MCPC. However, no formal investigation had been performed before the links to Shining Path were claimed. OjoPúblico described the media release by the military as "an inaccurate reference to the Shining Path."

The attack and subsequent media coverage would provide increased support for Fujimori, whose rhetoric aligned Castillo with armed communists. The Fujimori campaign used the attack as a springboard for support, pointing to alleged ties between MOVADEF, a Shining Path political group, and Castillo, attempting to align him to the attack. Fujimori expressed condemnation against the attack during a press conference in Tarapoto as well as regret that "bloody acts" still happened in the country and her condolences to the relatives of the victims. Pedro Castillo also condemned the killings during a rally in Huánuco, expressing solidarity towards the relatives of the victims and also urging the National Police to investigate the attack to clarify the events. Vladimir Cerrón, Secretary General of Free Peru, stated that "the right-wing needed [Shining] Path to win"; Cerrón deleted the tweet moments later while condemning any act of terrorism. Prime Minister Nuria Esparch, who held the position of the Ministry of Defense, condemned the attack and guaranteed that the electoral process would take place normally.

== Analysis ==
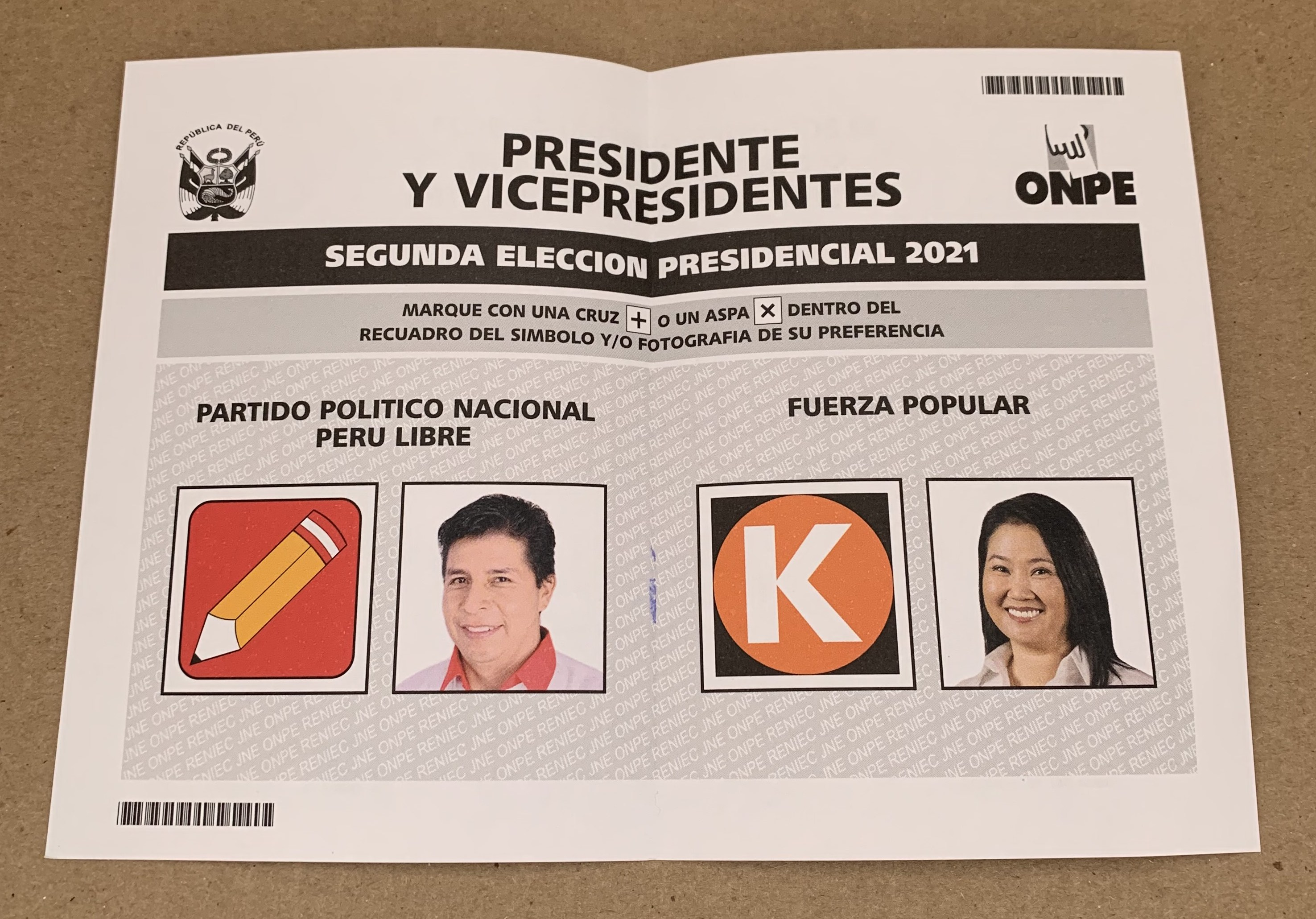
Ballot paper for the second round

=== Party politics ===
Political parties in Peru have been controlled by individuals seeking their own benefits, usually financial compensation. According to The Economist, political graft was the largest challenge facing Peru instead of the ideological battles in the press. Due to the large divisions of parties in congress, with over eleven parties elected into the Congress of Peru, whoever was elected into the presidency was expected to be weak due to the fractured congress. Political analyst Giovanna Peñaflor agreed with the theory of a weak presidency, saying that the fragmented congress would leave the executive vulnerable to legislators.

When discussing the state of party politics during the election, especially among congress, political scientist Adriana Urrutia said: "Political parties are no longer a vehicle for representation of the citizenry." Urrutia explained that traditional parties are known among Peruvians to represent groups related to corruption in Peru, including lucrative private universities, illegal logging, and illegal mining, among others.

The election also saw the emergence of many far-right candidates. Regarding the first round of presidential elections, Javier Puente, assistant professor of Latin American Studies at Smith College in the North American Congress on Latin America wrote: "With a baffling number of candidates – 18 in total – the 2021 presidential ballot included convicted felons, presumed money launderers, xenophobes, a fascist billionaire, an overrated and outdated economist, a retired mediocre footballer, a person accused of murdering a journalist, and other colorful figures. The vast majority of candidates represented the continuation of the neoliberal economic model that has been responsible for decades of meager financial performance and unequal growth." Puente stated that only three leftist candidates proposed alternatives to the neoliberal politicians (Veronika Mendoza, Marco Arana, and Pedro Castillo), describing Castillo as "far from being a 'comrade' who will champion leftist demands, Castillo is the new face of an anti-system impulse. ... Only in a neoliberal system that outcasts any form of market dissent as radical would a figure like Castillo acquire a role as a leftist."

The election also saw the emergence of Peru's traditionally conservative parties further to the right. Popular Renewal was the main party that pushed Popular Force and Avanza País to the right due to its rising popularity. Following the elections, the three parties, Avanza País, Popular Force and Popular Renewal, created an alliance and its bloc in Congress held about one-third of the seats in the legislature. Later, the bloc would sign the Madrid Charter, joining the Madrid Forum.

=== Rural vs. urban debate ===
In democratic elections since 1919, eleven of eighteen presidents of Peru were from Lima, even as many Peruvians in rural areas were not able to vote until 1979 when the constitution allowed illiterate individuals to vote. As globalization intensified through the twentieth century, distances between urban and rural areas increased, with larger cities increasing their ability to connect to the economy and increasing their wealth while smaller cities experienced resource and human capital flight to larger cities. Although economic statistics show improved economic data in Peru in recent decades, the wealth earned between 1990 and 2020 was not distributed throughout the country; living standards showed disparities between the more-developed capital city of Lima and similar coastal regions while rural provinces remained impoverished. The COVID-19 pandemic exasperated these disparities even further, with rural Peruvians feeling a sense of abandonment by the government as trade and trans-regional travel were prohibited, fueling increased distrust and autonomy among interior regions of the nation.

The success of Castillo in the first round induced panic among businesses, media entities and some intellectuals belonging to Peru's elite class. Leading to the election, opinion polls showed Peruvians with higher income favored Keiko while those with a lower income supported Castillo, with the latter demographic representing a larger portion of voters. This divide was further exacerbated following the election according to the New York Times, especially as Fujimori grew closer to Peru's elite and European classes. Castillo's candidacy brought attention to this divide with much of his support being earned in the exterior portions of the country. In May 2021, Americas Quarterly wrote: "Life expectancy in Huancavelica, for example, the region where Castillo received his highest share of the vote in the first round, is seven years shorter than in Lima. In Puno, where Castillo received over 47% of the vote, the infant mortality rate is almost three times that of Lima's."

According to historian José Ragas of the Pontifical Catholic University of Chile, although Castillo was accused of being linked to communist terrorism, "in places where terrorism caused the most bloodshed, Castillo won by a lot." The separation of Lima and rural Peru also led to the underestimation of Castillo's performance in first-round elections. Castillo received a majority vote in all but one of Peru's mining provinces, with researcher Hugo Ñopo of the Lima-based GRADE stating: "The regions that provide those minerals that make Peru rich do not improve the living standards of the local communities, ... Many people perceive that the winners of these three decades are not them, but are the people in Lima and the big cities." Sociologist Maritza Paredes of the Pontifical Catholic University of Peru shared similar thoughts, saying: "People see that all the natural resources are in the countryside but all the benefits are concentrated in Lima."

Castillo's supporters considered his campaign a historical moment and sparked political enthusiasm that had not been observed in Peru for many decades. When entering the second round, Castillo was seen as a real change to begin a new historical cycle in Peru as he spent most of his career outside of Lima and was of rural origin, with tens of thousands of people defying COVID-19 restrictions to rally for Castillo in Cusco, Puno and other outlying provinces. In contrast, Fujimori's supporters saw her as a candidate that would prevent change from occurring in Peru. The existing disparities in Peru caused a "globalization fatigue" according to Asensio, resulting in a polarization between rural and urban areas that saw differing priorities with lifestyle, economics and politics. These sentiments were especially apparent during the second round of elections when establishment politicians from urban areas characterized and criminalized the lifestyles of rural Peruvians who felt that neoliberalism damaged their economic, social and cultural conditions. Asensio writes that Castillo, being recognized as a "true Peruvian" by his supporters, was able to capitalize on the "globalization fatigue" sentiments shared by the rural population and establish support by saying he would reverse the favoritism of Lima and defending regional rights.

Fujimori's response to Castillo's victory was to portray her movement as defending democracy and assumed a nationalist image, adopting the Peru national football team uniform and colors during rallies. This intensified political polarization between urban and rural Peruvians, portraying rich, white individuals as democratic while identifying indigenous poor individuals as communists.

=== Polarization ===
Due to the internal conflict in Peru involving far-left guerrilla groups attacking Peru's institutions which mainly occurred in the 1980s and 1990s, sentiments towards left-wing political parties have a negative stigma skewed against them. While campaigning occurred during the elections, right-wing politicians would often baselessly characterize left-wing politicians as terrorists, or terrucos in Peruvian Spanish, with the attacks being so common that they were given the term terruqueo. Billboards in support of Fujimori during the second round disseminated a message framing the election as being between "freedom and dictatorship" and "democracy and communism".

The Americas Quarterly argues that such behavior resulted with less support for the leftist candidate Verónika Mendoza and promoted political polarization within Peru. With the ongoing political crisis that saw in the span of two years the dissolution of the Congress of Peru and the removal of three presidents (Pedro Pablo Kuczynski, Martín Vizcarra, and Manuel Merino), concerns were raised among analysts about the increased political polarization's relationship with Peru's democratic stability. Lead researcher of pollster Institute of Peruvian Studies, Patricia Zárate, stated: "I think the scenario that's coming is really frightening."

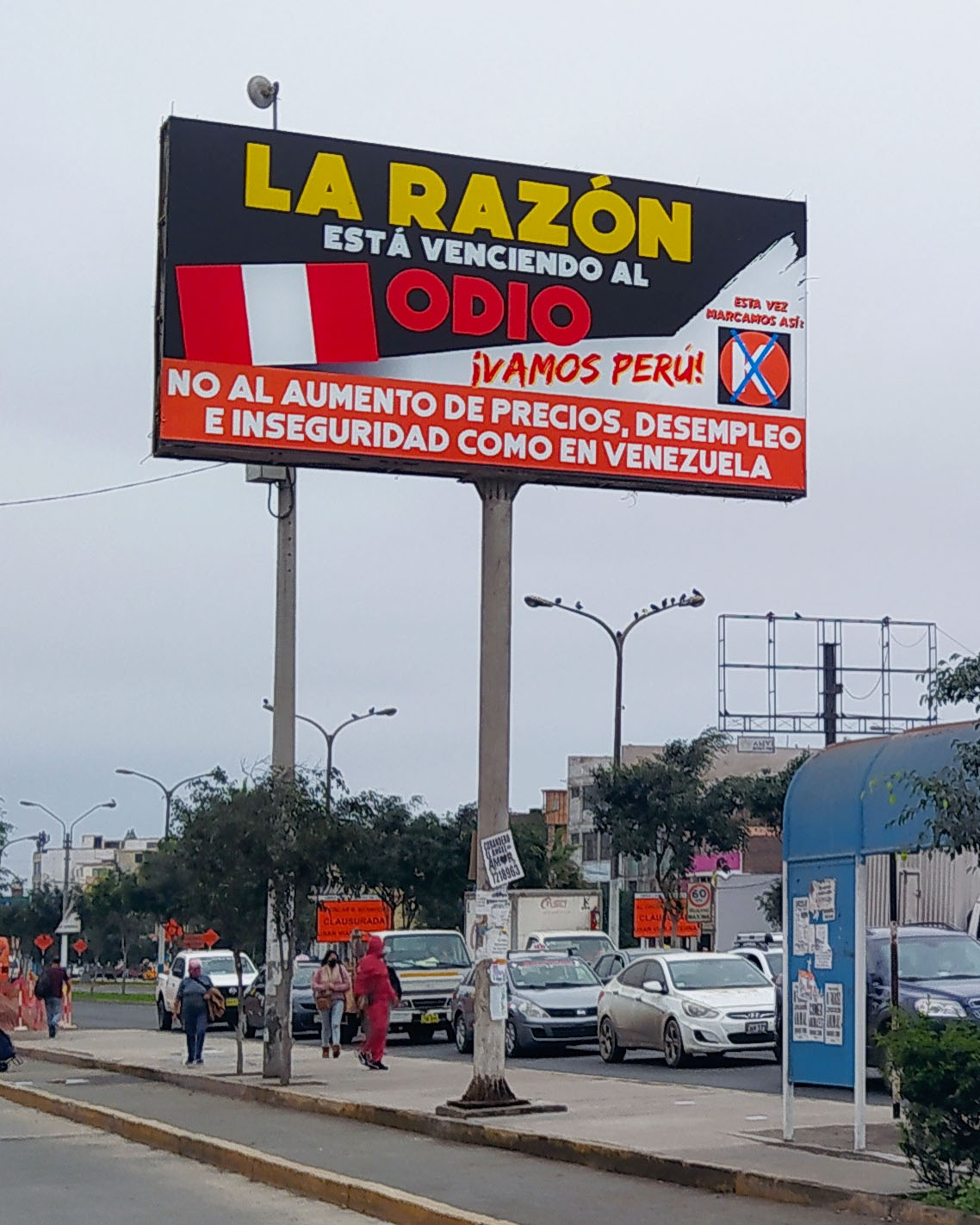
Pro-fujimorist billboard ad in Bellavista, Callao, urging voters to vote against "rising prices, unemployment and insecurity just like in Venezuela"

As the second round of elections approached, Fujimori's campaign used fearmongering tactics to gain support of the middle and upper classes in Lima, accusing Castillo of attempting to institute communism in Peru and to follow the path of Hugo Chávez and Nicolas Maduro in Venezuela. Some scholars have recognized the similarities of Fujimori and Castillo; both are cultural conservatives opposing same-sex marriage and abortion, as campaigning for the second round of elections began. Olga González, associate dean of the Kofi Annan Institute for Global Citizenship at Macalester College, stated that the situation is more complex than "binaries" between social classes, although she acknowledged that such dichotomies "speak to how polarized the country is."

With the support of Mario Vargas Llosa and his son Álvaro Vargas Llosa's neoliberal Fundación International para la Libertad (FIL), Fujimori attempted to reshape her image as being more democratic. Vargas Llosa ran and lost against Alberto Fujimori in Peru's 1990 elections, and had previously criticized Fujimori, making statements such as "the worst option is that of Keiko Fujimori because it means the legitimation of one of the worst dictatorships that Peru has had in its history" and that "Keiko is the daughter of a murderer and a thief who is imprisoned, tried by civil courts with international observers, sentenced to 25 years in prison for murder and theft. I do not want her to win the elections."

=== Media ===
During the intense periods of internal conflict in Peru in the 1980s and 1990s when far-left groups waged an insurgency, the government, military, and media in described any individual who was far-left on the political spectrum as being a threat to the nation, with many students, professors, union members, and peasants being jailed or killed for their political beliefs.

Some business groups, broadcast television channels and media organizations in Peru supported Fujimori's campaign by appealing to fear when discussing political opponents. Reuters wrote that El Comercio, one of the largest media organizations in South America, "has generally backed Fujimori" although it ended support Fujimori following her claims of fraud. For the first round of elections, conservative Peruvian media focused attacks against Veronika Mendoza, a left-wing candidate. The media's attacks resulted support moving from Mendoza to Pedro Castillo, who was further left on the political spectrum.

In the second round of elections, some Peruvian media networks were accused of aligning with Fujimori to discredit Castillo. They allegedly disseminated fake news against Castillo. Le Monde diplomatique wrote, "The privately owned media torpedoed Castillo incessantly with fake news, and not without rattling the Shining Path scarecrow". International media also stated that conservative Peruvian news organizations polished Fujimori's image and praised her, as well as assisting her media campaign tactic which included attacks accusing Castillo of being linked to armed communist groups. The Guardian described accusations linking Castillo to Shining Path as "incorrect", while the Associated Press said that allegations by Peruvian media of links to Shining Path were "unsupported."

Colombian journalist Clara Elvira Ospina of Grupo La República who was the journalistic director of La República's América Televisión and El Comercio's Canal N was removed from her position on 24 April 2021 after having served in the position for a total of nine years. Grupo La República shareholder Gustavo Mohme Seminario said that the firing occurred shortly after Ospina had a conversation with Keiko Fujimori and other news editors. One anonymous individual said that Ospina allegedly told Fujimori that the journalistic direction of the media organizations would not favor her or Castillo, instead remaining impartial during their coverage.

Mohme criticized the dismissal of Ospina, saying: "I do not want to be a silent troupe of these legal shenanigans that seeks to arbitrarily impose who will assume the reins of the main television channel in the country." Mohme resigned from the editorial council. The Knight Center for Specialized Journalism wrote that Mohme described the incident as self-censorship. Diego Salazar, former editor of Peru21, said that the dismissal was "an obvious sign that you are seeking to intervene in the electoral campaign in a way that is not journalistic." Members of Cuarto Poder, an investigative journalism program on América TV, had their letter to the board of directors leaked in May 2021 where they said that Ospina's dismissal "represented serious damage to the work we do and to the image of the program", and accused her replacement, Gilberto Hume, of having an agenda against Castillo and in favor of Fujimori, writing: "Within that conversation it was implicit that (Hume) asked us to support the candidate of Fuerza Popular to the detriment of the candidate of Free Peru." Luis Galarreta, Fujimori's pick for first vice president, said that the meeting with Ospina was discussing debates and "nothing more", adding that "nobody thinks of influencing a medium." Shortly after polls closed on 6 June, the journalists of Cuarto Poder who sent a letter criticizing alleged censorship were fired by La República's América Televisión and El Comercio's Canal N.

== Results ==
=== President ===
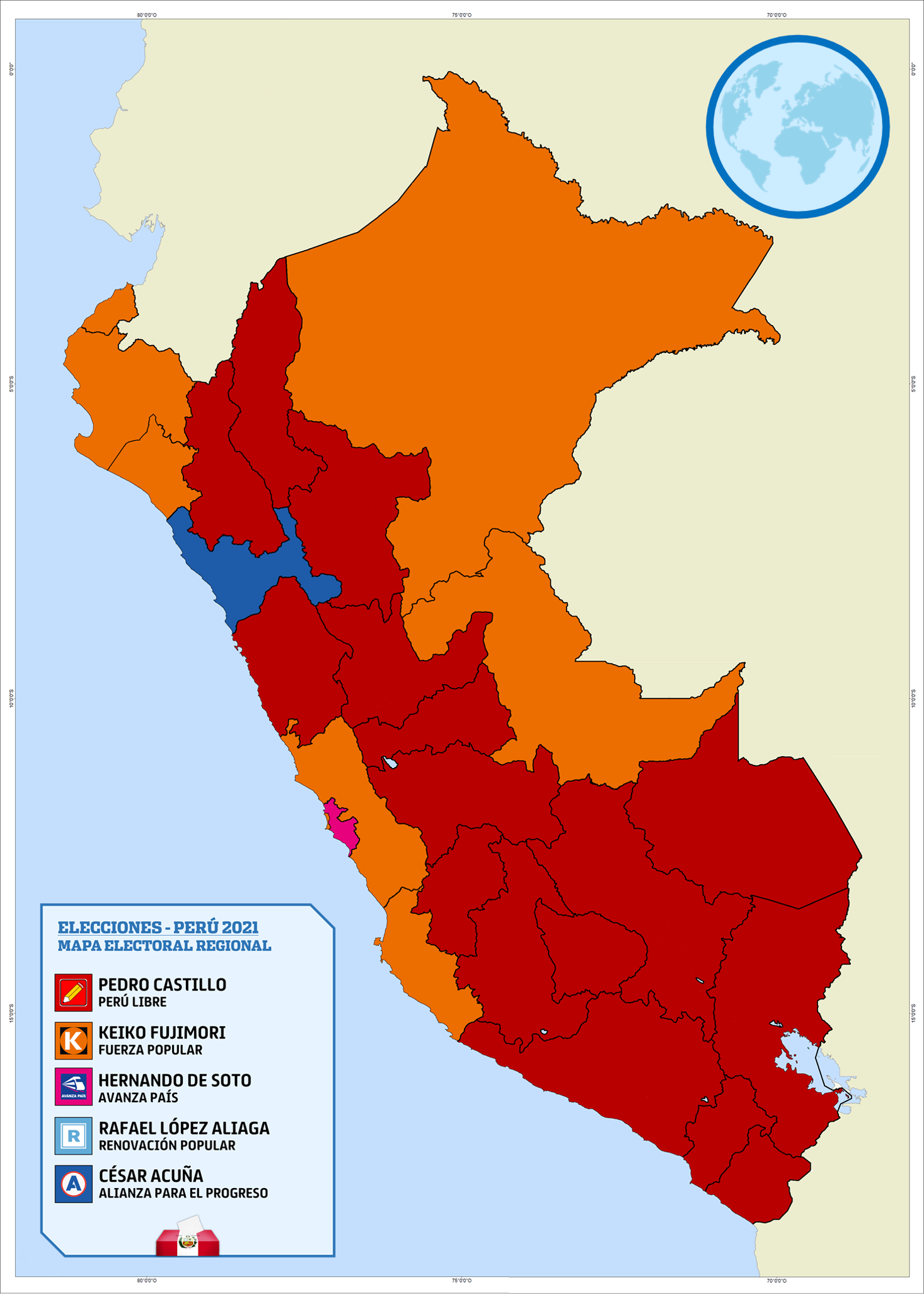
Leading candidate by region in the first round

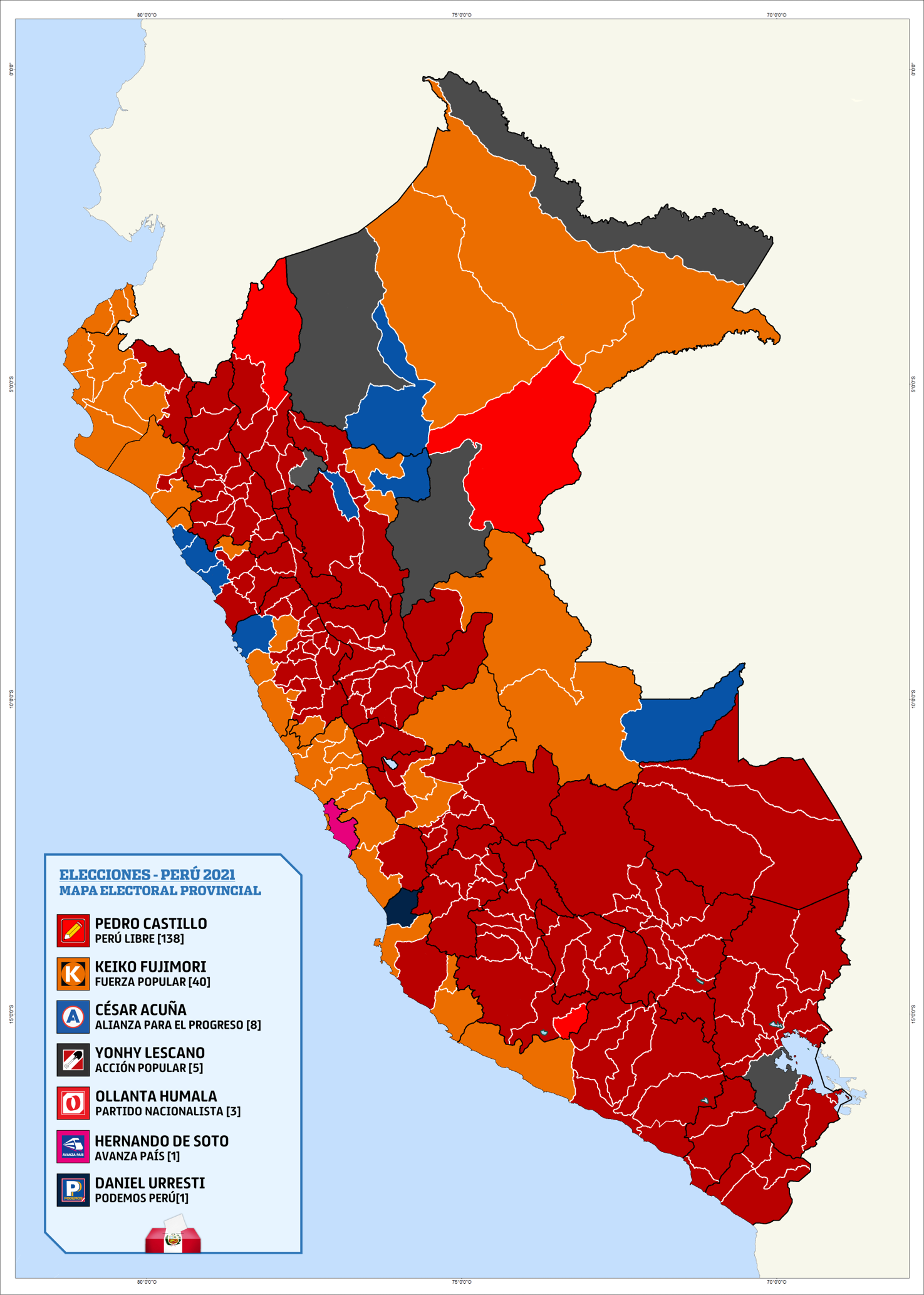
Leading candidate by province in the first round

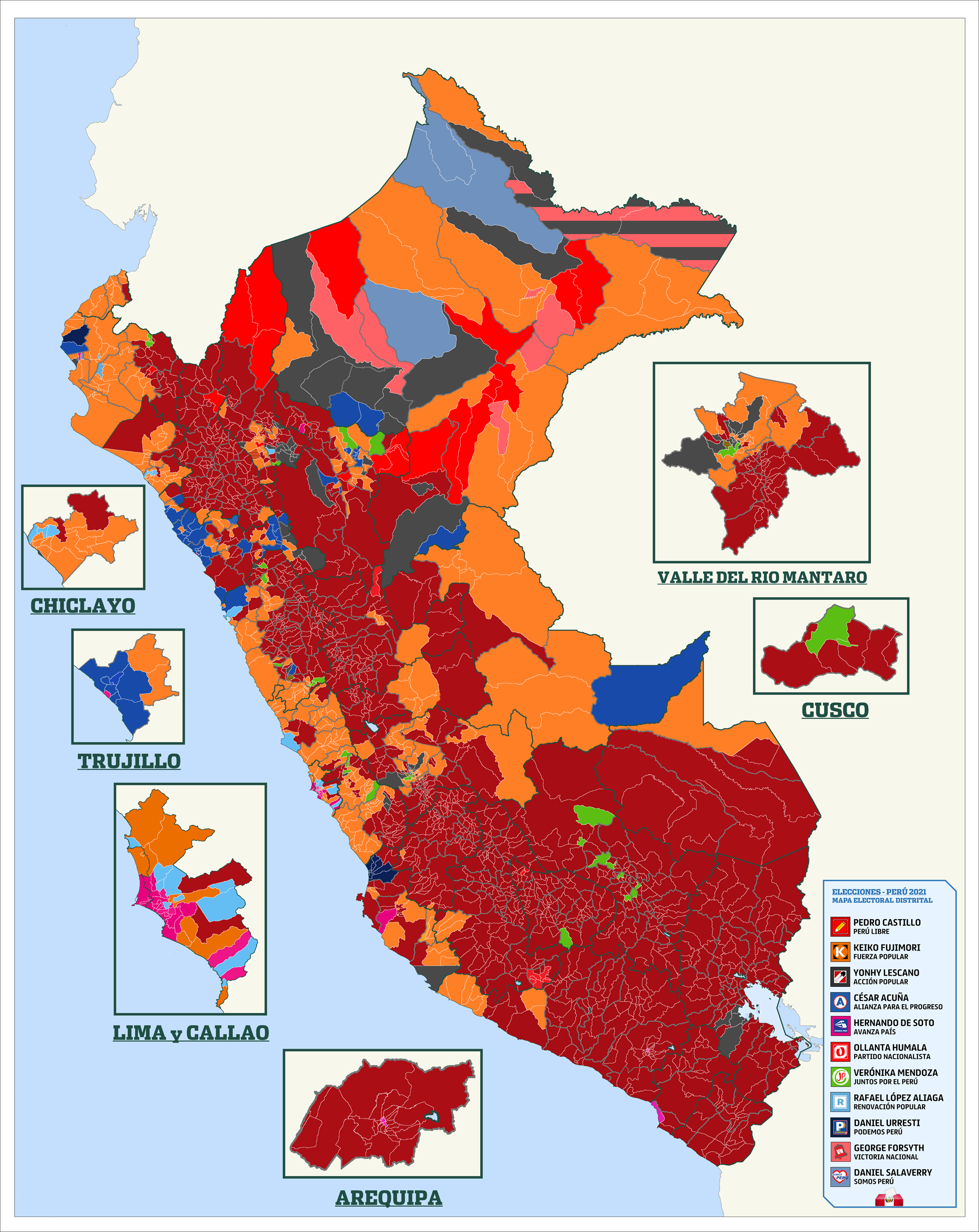
Leading candidate by district in the first round

Leading candidate by Peruvians abroad in the first round

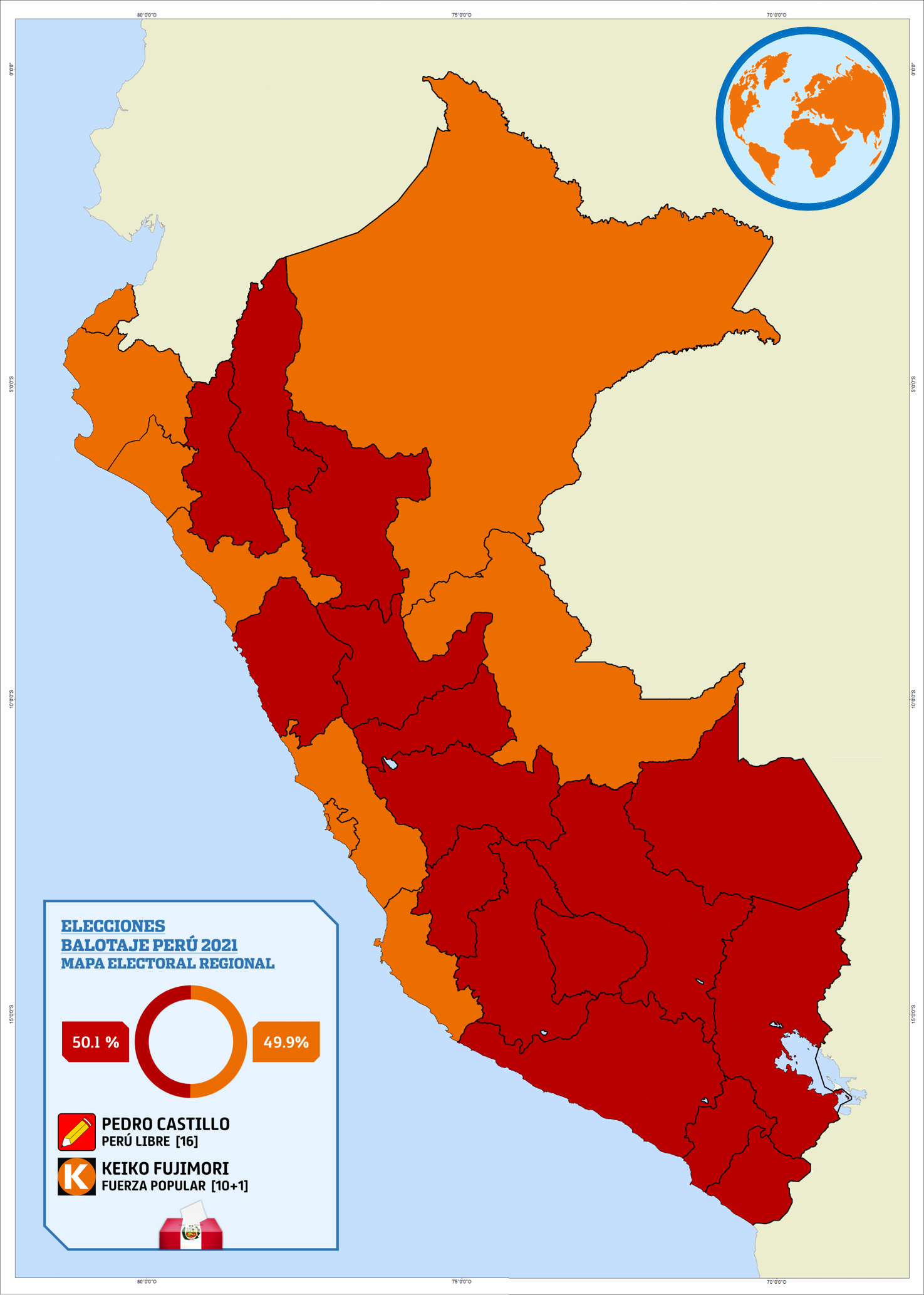
Leading candidate by region in the second round

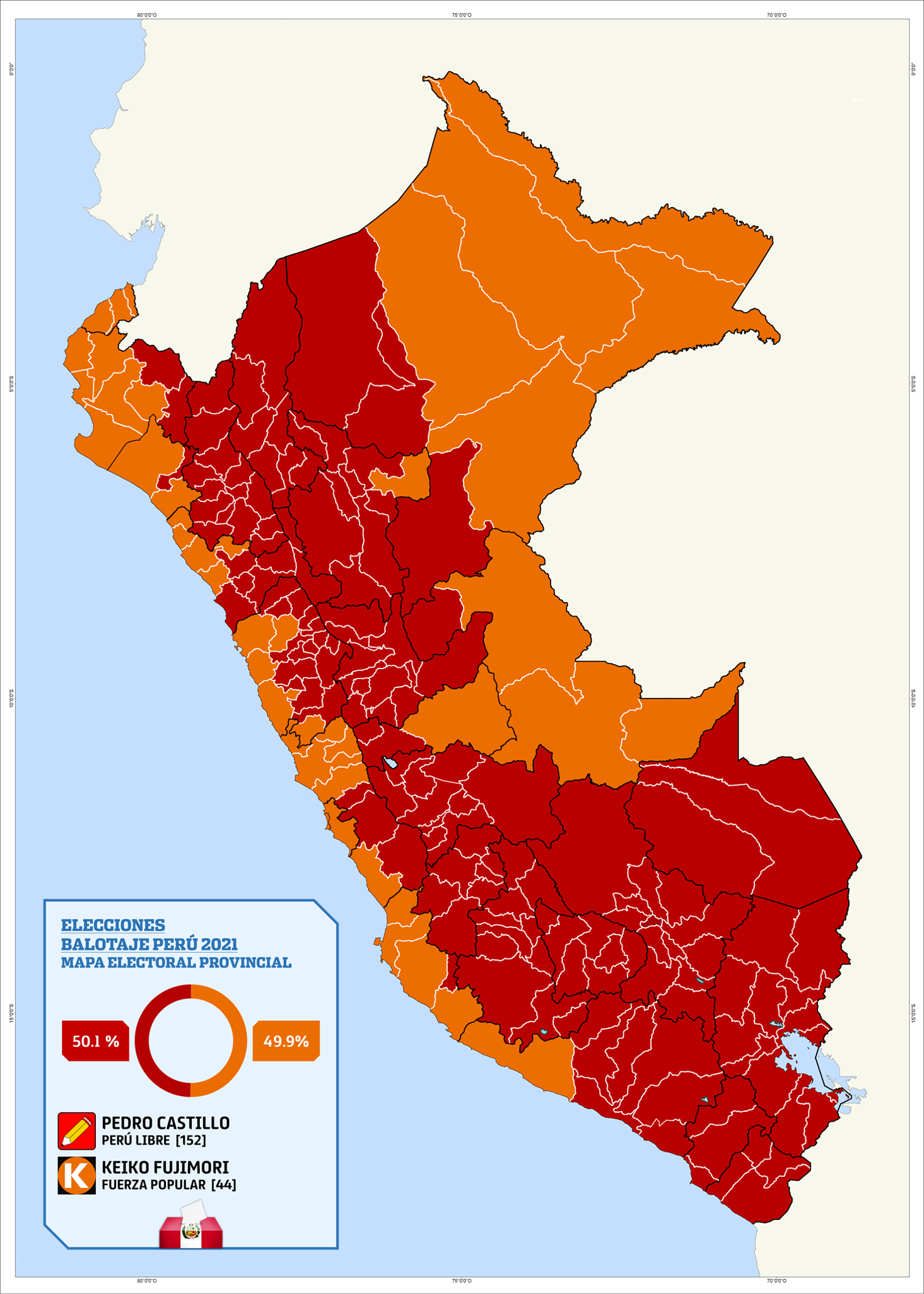
Leading candidate by province in the second round

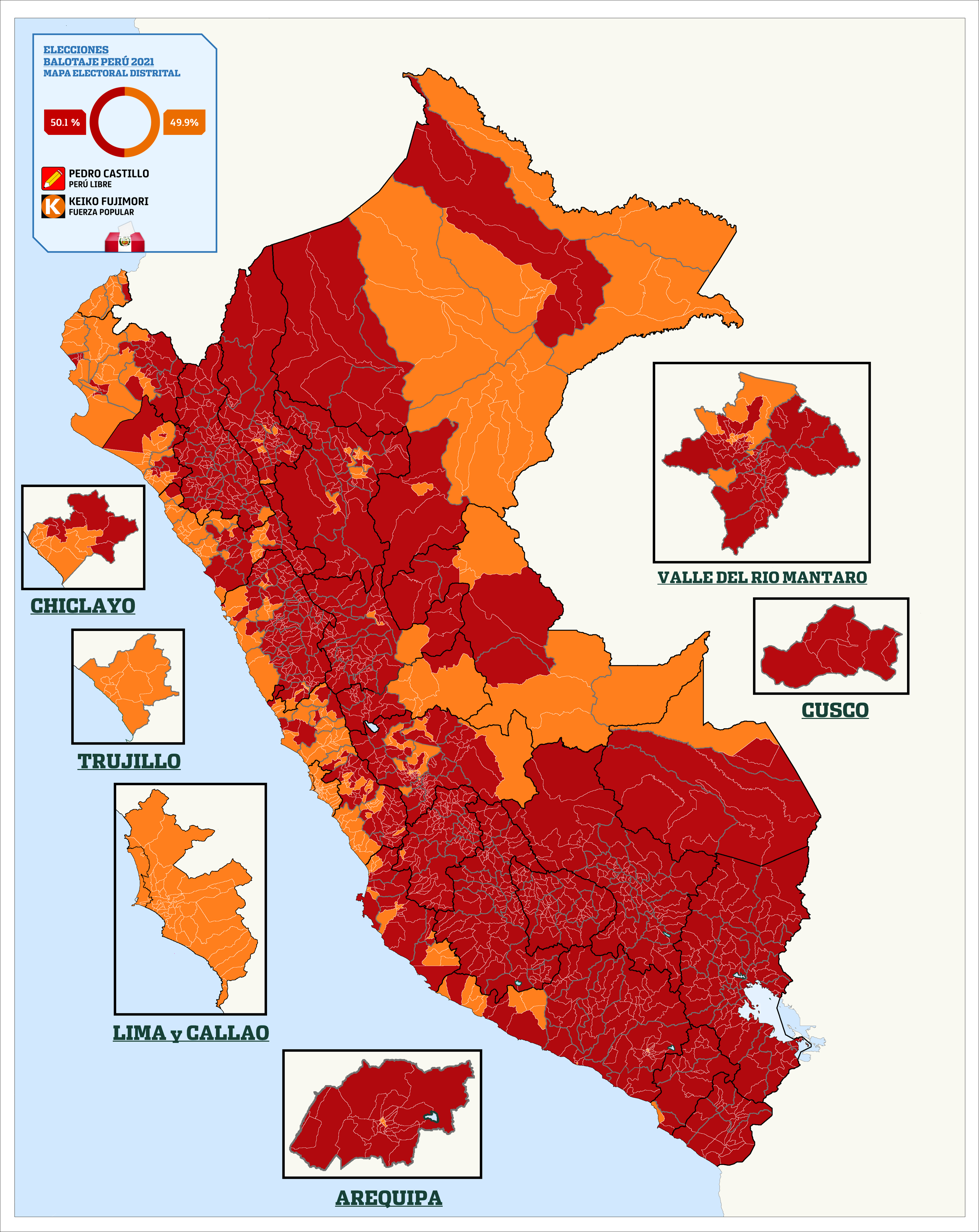
Leading candidate by district in the second round

Leading candidate by Peruvians abroad in the second round

The first round was held on 11 April. The first exit polls published indicated that underdog nominee Pedro Castillo of Free Peru had placed first in the first round of voting with approximately 16.1% of the vote, with Hernando de Soto and Keiko Fujimori tying with 11.9% each. Yonhy Lescano, Rafael López Aliaga, Verónika Mendoza, and George Forsyth followed, with each receiving 11.0%, 10.5%, 8.8%, and 6.4%, respectively. César Acuña and Daniel Urresti received 5.8% and 5.0%, respectively, while the rest of the nominees attained less than 3% of the popular vote.

In the second round, Castillo defeated Fujimori by just 44,263 votes, winning by 50.13% to 49.87%. Castillo was officially designated as president-elect of Peru on 19 July 2021, a little over a week before he was to be inaugurated.

Candidate	Party	First round		Second round	
Candidate	Party	Votes	%	Votes	%
Pedro Castillo	Free Peru	2,724,752	18.92	8,836,380	50.13
Keiko Fujimori	Popular Force	1,930,762	13.41	8,792,117	49.87
Rafael López Aliaga	Popular Renewal	1,692,279	11.75		
Hernando de Soto	Avanza País	1,674,201	11.63		
Yonhy Lescano	Popular Action	1,306,288	9.07		
Verónika Mendoza	Together for Peru	1,132,577	7.86		
César Acuña	Alliance for Progress	867,025	6.02		
George Forsyth	National Victory	814,516	5.66		
Daniel Urresti	Podemos Perú	812,721	5.64		
Julio Guzmán	Purple Party	325,608	2.26		
Alberto Beingolea	Christian People's Party	286,447	1.99		
Daniel Salaverry	We Are Peru	240,234	1.67		
Ollanta Humala	Peruvian Nationalist Party	230,831	1.60		
José Vega	Union for Peru	101,267	0.70		
Ciro Gálvez	National United Renaissance	89,376	0.62		
Marco Arana	Broad Front	65,300	0.45		
Rafael Santos	Peru Secure Homeland	55,644	0.39		
Andrés Alcántara	Direct Democracy	50,802	0.35		
Total		14,400,630	100.00	17,628,497	100.00
Valid votes		14,400,630	81.30	17,628,497	93.49
Invalid votes		1,123,027	6.34	1,106,816	5.87
Blank votes		2,190,059	12.36	121,489	0.64
Total votes		17,713,716	100.00	18,856,802	100.00
Registered voters/turnout		25,287,954	70.05	25,287,954	74.57
Source: ONPE, ONPE

==== By department ====
===== First round =====
Department	Castillo		Fujimori		Aliaga		De Soto		Lescano		Mendoza		Acuña		Others		Blank		Invalid		Turnout		Registered voters
Department	Votes	%	Votes	%	Votes	%	Votes	%	Votes	%	Votes	%	Votes	%	Votes	%	Votes	%	Votes	%	Votes	%	Registered voters
Amazonas	34,464	16.85%	17,815	8.71%	8,274	4.05%	4,433	2.17%	12,703	6.21%	8,894	4.35%	11,531	5.64%	54,510	26.66%	37,376	18.28%	14,482	7.08%	204,482	66.78%	306,186
Áncash	110,620	16.19%	67,394	9.86%	42,312	6.19%	34,562	5.06%	38,911	5.70%	39,786	5.82%	44,047	6.45%	177,986	26.05%	92,664	13.56%	49,401	7.23%	683,483	77.12%	886,265
Apurímac	88,812	36.59%	10,879	4.48%	7,768	3.20%	6,531	2.69%	15,649	6.45%	15,368	6.33%	2,154	0.89%	36,547	15.06%	41,563	17.13%	11,511	4.74%	242,782	76.83%	316,000
Arequipa	256,224	26.02%	40,216	4.08%	71,053	7.22%	148,793	15.11%	88,708	9.01%	55,269	5.61%	18,790	1.91%	190,717	19.37%	67,914	6.90%	38,618	3.92%	984,302	85.94%	1,145,268
Ayacucho	130,224	35.71%	24,506	6.72%	11,490	3.15%	8,995	2.47%	20,315	5.57%	24,506	6.72%	4,891	1.34%	55,020	15.09%	57,804	15.85%	16,467	4.52%	364,218	76.96%	473,282
Cajamarca	232,418	30.60%	54,962	7.24%	31,129	4.10%	25,156	3.31%	38,677	5.09%	29,746	3.92%	43,422	5.72%	135,120	17.79%	126,202	16.62%	46,983	6.19%	759,815	68.87%	1,103,247
Callao	33,750	5.15%	79,699	12.16%	78,066	11.91%	78,920	12.04%	34,965	5.33%	38,233	5.83%	25,917	3.95%	219,867	33.54%	56,463	8.61%	38,510	5.87%	655,390	79.49%	824,496
Cusco	232,178	27.77%	27,132	3.24%	29,618	3.54%	40,423	4.83%	60,659	7.25%	123,397	14.76%	16,034	1.92%	218,023	26.07%	100,631	12.03%	45,138	5.40%	836,233	81.56%	1,025,280
Huancavelica	79,895	35.73%	8,449	3.78%	5,060	2.26%	4,591	2.05%	16,727	7.48%	10,091	4.51%	2,312	1.03%	32,665	14.61%	43,523	19.46%	11,640	5.21%	223,553	74.55%	299,843
Huánuco	110,978	24.72%	32,827	7.31%	33,787	7.52%	15,822	3.52%	22,565	5.02%	15,556	3.46%	16,555	3.69%	79,244	17.64%	78,736	17.53%	26,421	5.88%	449,091	76.58%	586,411
Ica	56,627	10.91%	62,102	11.96%	46,116	8.88%	39,949	7.69%	39,475	7.60%	30,611	5.89%	16,716	3.22%	161,545	31.11%	58,926	11.35%	30,129	5.80%	519,296	79.72%	651,364
Junín	131,438	16.17%	80,057	9.85%	52,599	6.47%	54,124	6.66%	66,214	8.15%	52,270	6.43%	22,251	2.74%	189,666	23.34%	94,049	11.57%	38,624	4.75%	812,892	82.73%	982,556
La Libertad	90,324	8.35%	131,866	12.19%	95,973	8.87%	84,566	7.82%	47,322	4.37%	37,474	3.46%	166,783	15.42%	334,797	30.95%	130,230	12.04%	70,217	6.49%	1,081,592	75.66%	1,429,469
Lambayeque	73,279	10.05%	121,263	16.64%	86,126	11.82%	50,087	6.87%	51,467	7.06%	28,866	3.96%	58,849	8.08%	184,346	25.30%	86,131	11.82%	45,351	6.22%	728,765	74.54%	977,656
Lima	416,743	6.23%	754,216	11.28%	870,416	13.02%	871,000	13.03%	362,881	5.43%	431,633	6.46%	206,522	3.09%	2,035,250	30.44%	541,365	8.10%	354,349	5.30%	6,684,375	80.32%	8,322,644
Loreto	15,662	3.48%	52,344	11.64%	16,449	3.66%	18,846	4.19%	34,998	7.78%	19,631	4.37%	36,744	8.17%	175,809	39.09%	82,521	18.35%	29,854	6.64%	449,858	64.28%	699,964
Madre de Dios	23,945	26.90%	7,278	8.18%	4,041	4.54%	3,996	4.49%	6,601	7.42%	4,372	4.91%	3,463	3.89%	18,713	21.03%	12,917	14.51%	5,319	5.98%	88,977	76.37%	116,513
Moquegua	33,665	27.45%	4,617	3.77%	6,832	5.57%	10,183	8.30%	15,412	12.57%	7,190	5.86%	2,244	1.83%	27,217	22.20%	11,894	9.70%	4,712	3.84%	122,618	82.64%	148,367
Pasco	34,187	24.56%	12,607	9.06%	8,009	5.75%	5,102	3.66%	11,871	8.53%	6,896	4.95%	5,470	3.93%	28,220	20.27%	20,025	14.38%	7,706	5.53%	139,193	69.36%	200,682
Piura	71,028	7.15%	173,933	17.52%	68,356	6.89%	63,866	6.43%	51,250	5.16%	44,610	4.49%	77,291	7.79%	272,512	27.45%	147,622	14.87%	83,619	8.42%	992,641	71.09%	1,396,448
Puno	292,218	35.47%	17,514	2.13%	15,918	1.93%	21,665	2.63%	175,712	21.33%	35,484	4.31%	11,225	1.36%	92,494	11.23%	96,016	11.65%	43,715	5.31%	823,961	89.37%	922,016
San Martin	67,000	14.00%	46,699	9.76%	26,561	5.55%	21,825	4.56%	31,498	6.58%	17,122	3.58%	37,057	7.74%	119,887	25.05%	89,963	18.80%	36,696	7.67%	478,608	75.21%	636,330
Tacna	64,521	27.49%	9,363	3.99%	17,842	7.60%	21,000	8.95%	28,696	12.23%	14,068	5.99%	4,418	1.88%	52,847	22.52%	16,092	6.86%	9,784	4.17%	234,631	82.92%	282,974
Tumbes	7,613	5.88%	36,403	28.14%	8,799	6.80%	7,123	5.51%	7,046	5.45%	5,242	4.05%	10,680	8.26%	31,257	24.17%	16,156	12.49%	10,695	8.27%	129,300	77.07%	167,771
Ucayali	26,339	9.69%	40,510	14.90%	14,981	5.51%	11,124	4.09%	14,359	5.28%	15,092	5.55%	18,589	6.84%	81,057	29.81%	52,752	19.40%	17,281	6.36%	271,920	69.74%	389,889
Peruvians abroad	10,600	4.42%	22,866	9.54%	34,704	14.48%	21,519	8.98%	11,607	4.84%	21,170	8.83%	3,070	1.28%	60,277	25.15%	30,524	12.73%	35,805	14.94%	239,703	24.04%	997,033

===== Second round =====
2021 Peruvian presidential election results – Second round by Department
Department	Castillo		Fujimori		Blank		Invalid		Turnout		Registered voters
Department	Votes	%	Votes	%	Votes	%	Votes	%	Votes	%	Registered voters
Amazonas	121,162	62.50%	60,451	31.20%	1,748	0.90%	10,505	5.41%	193,866	63.32%	306,186
Ancash	347,457	53.52%	247,628	38.14%	6,979	1.07%	47,178	7.26%	649,242	73.26%	886,265
Apurimac	174,344	76.67%	39,666	17.44%	2,349	1.03%	11,045	4.86%	227,404	71.96%	316,000
Arequipa	558,085	61.15%	302,622	31.16%	3,599	0.39%	48,401	5.30%	912,707	79.69%	1,145,268
Ayacucho	266,824	78.39%	56,061	16.47%	2,686	0.79%	14,796	4.35%	340,367	71.92%	473,282
Cajamarca	509,790	66.68%	205,403	26.87%	7,639	1.00%	41,699	5.45%	764,531	69.30%	1,103,247
Callao	198,503	30.27%	410,860	62.66%	2,982	0.45%	43,374	6.61%	655,719	79.53%	824,496
Cusco	610,521	78.50%	123,295	15.85%	5,420	0.70%	38,471	4.94%	777,707	75.85%	1,025,280
Huancavelica	166,279	80.38%	29,782	14.40%	2,057	0.99%	8,731	4.22%	206,849	68.99%	299,843
Huanuco	255,556	63.07%	121,899	30.08%	3,897	0.96%	23,867	5.89%	405,219	69.10%	586,411
Ica	233,316	44.84%	257,640	49.52%	3,174	0.61%	26,143	5.02%	520,273	79.87%	651,364
Junín	396,598	54.28%	285,375	39.05%	5,383	0.73%	43,359	5.93%	730,715	74.37%	982,556
La Libertad	392,224	36.90%	588,417	55.36%	7,703	0.72%	74,608	7.01%	1,062,952	74.36%	1,429,469
Lambayeque	289,784	38.84%	403,216	54.04%	4,984	0.67%	48,129	6.45%	746,113	76.32%	977,656
Lima	2,195,770	33.12%	4,014,342	60.55%	32,520	0.49%	386,834	5.84%	6,629,466	79.66%	8,322,644
Loreto	193,765	44.70%	208,232	48.05%	3,554	0.82%	27,845	6.42%	433,396	61.92%	699,964
Madre de Dios	57,387	66.87%	23,372	27.23%	548	0.64%	4,518	5.26%	85,825	73.66%	116,513
Moquegua	80,520	69.25%	29,578	25.44%	630	0.54%	5,554	4.78%	116,282	78.37%	148,367
Pasco	82,851	61.41%	43,922	32.55%	1,022	0.76%	7,126	5.28%	134,921	67.23%	200,682
Piura	388,901	36.96%	584,584	55.56%	8,216	0.78%	70,388	0.67%	1,052,089	75.34%	1,396,448
Puno	645,813	85.33%	77,739	10.27%	3,496	0.46%	29,806	3.94%	756,854	82.09%	922,016
San Martin	241,491	51.94%	188,834	40.61%	4,667	1.00%	29,946	6.44%	464,938	73.07%	636,330
Tacna	154,223	68.69%	58,307	25.97%	1,086	0.48%	10,918	4.86%	224,534	79.35%	282,974
Tumbes	41,464	31.56%	80,064	60.93%	852	0.65%	9,020	6.86%	131,400	78.32%	167,771
Ucayali	121,081	44.88%	130,240	48.27%	2,300	0.85%	16,172	5.99%	269,793	69.20%	389,889
Peruvians abroad	112,671	30.98%	220,588	60.66%	1,998	0.55%	28,383	7.81%	363,640	36.47%	997,033

=== Congress ===
Results of the Congressional election

Map of percentage of votes received by the largest party per region

The Popular Action, the largest party in the previous legislature, lost some of its seats, and previous parliamentary parties like Union for Peru (UPP) and the Broad Front (FA) had their worst results ever, attaining no representation. The Peruvian Nationalist Party of former President Ollanta Humala and National Victory of George Forsyth (who led polling for the presidential election earlier in the year) failed to win seats as well. New or previously minor parties such as Free Peru, Avanza País and Together for Peru and Popular Renewal, the successor of National Solidarity, had good results, with Free Peru becoming the largest party in Congress. Contigo, the successor to former president Pedro Pablo Kuczynski's Peruvians for Change party, failed to win a seat once again and received less than 1% of the vote. On 26 July, two days before Castillo was sworn in as Peru's President, an opposition alliance led by Popular Action member María del Carmen Alva successfully negotiated an agreement to gain control of Peru's Congress.

Party	Votes	%	Seats	+/–
Free Peru	1,724,354	13.41	37	+37
Popular Force	1,457,694	11.34	24	+9
Popular Renewal	1,199,705	9.33	13	+13
Popular Action	1,159,734	9.02	16	−9
Alliance for Progress	969,726	7.54	15	−7
Avanza País	969,092	7.54	7	+7
Together for Peru	847,596	6.59	5	+5
We Are Peru	788,522	6.13	5	−6
Podemos Perú	750,262	5.83	5	−6
Purple Party	697,307	5.42	3	−6
National Victory	638,289	4.96	0	New
Agricultural People's Front of Peru	589,018	4.58	0	−15
Union for Peru	266,349	2.07	0	−13
Christian People's Party	212,820	1.65	0	0
Peruvian Nationalist Party	195,538	1.52	0	New
Broad Front	135,104	1.05	0	−9
Direct Democracy	100,033	0.78	0	0
National United Renaissance	97,540	0.76	0	0
Peru Secure Homeland	54,859	0.43	0	0
Contigo	5,787	0.05	0	0
Total	12,859,329	100.00	130	0
Valid votes	12,859,329	72.56		
Invalid votes	2,737,099	15.44		
Blank votes	2,126,712	12.00		
Total votes	17,723,140	100.00		
Registered voters/turnout	25,287,954	70.09		
Source: ONPE, Ojo Público

=== Andean Parliament ===
Party	Votes	%	Seats	+/–
Free Peru	1,713,196	16.24	1	+1
Popular Force	1,249,938	11.85	1	–2
Popular Renewal	1,094,709	10.37	1	+1
Popular Action	964,563	9.14	1	+1
Avanza País	919,212	8.71	1	New
Podemos Perú	747,303	7.08	0	New
Together for Peru	736,001	6.97	0	0
Alliance for Progress	713,542	6.76	0	0
Agricultural People's Front of Peru	670,393	6.35	0	New
Purple Party	582,904	5.52	0	New
We Are Peru	447,437	4.24	0	0
Christian People's Party	209,697	1.99	0	0
Peruvian Nationalist Party	177,984	1.69	0	0
Broad Front	127,844	1.21	0	–1
National United Renaissance	101,822	0.96	0	0
Direct Democracy	95,594	0.91	0	0
Total	10,552,139	100.00	5	0
Valid votes	10,552,139	59.73		
Invalid/blank votes	7,112,968	40.27		
Total votes	17,665,107	100.00		
Registered voters/turnout	25,212,354	70.07		
Source: ONPE

== Aftermath ==
=== Overturn attempts ===
After the publication of the quick count and the first official results, protests by supporters of both Free Peru and Popular Force took place. Amid the fraud accusations and the final vote count, there were nearly daily protests and marches, mostly in the capital Lima. Besides Fujimori supporters, groups opposed to Castillo, mobilized by the fear of communism or aversion to the left wing, mobilized asking for the annulment of the elections. After exit polls gave the victory to Keiko Fujimori over Pedro Castillo, supporters of Free Peru mobilized to the offices of the ONPE to protest against a possible fraud against their candidate, bringing banners saying "no to the fraud." From Tacabamba, Cajamarca, Castillo called upon his followers and supporters on Twitter to "defend the votes" and go to the streets to "defend democracy." Protests against Fujimori and an alleged fraud took place in cities such as Juliaca, Puno, and Ilave. During a mobilization in the San Martín Square in Lima, rondas campesinas supportive of Castillo carried machetes with them. On 14 July, several pro-Fujimori protesters gathered at the Government Palace demanding an audit of the election. Protesters clashed with the National Police of Peru, and Health Minister Óscar Ugarte and Housing Minister Solangel Fernández were attacked during the protests. On 15 July, Sagasti reaffirmed that there was no evidence of voter fraud.

Following reports of Castillo's apparent victory, Fujimori and her supporters made unsubstantiated claims of electoral fraud, leading efforts to overturn the election with support of citizens in Lima. Rumors spread of a possible coup d'état against Castillo, if he were declared the official winner of the presidential election. A letter signed by almost one-hundred retired officers of the Peruvian armed forces was written calling on current military leaders in Peru to refuse recognizing the election of Castillo into the presidency. President Sagasti condemned the letter, stating: "They want to incite top commanders of the Army, Navy, and Air force to break the rule of law." According to analysts, Peru was more susceptible to unrest as a result of Fujimori's narrative since democratic institutions are weaker in the nation. Minor clashes occurred in Lima between Fujimori supporters from the capital city and Castillo supporters from other regions, with rondas campesinas equipped with sticks and machetes arriving in the Historic Centre of Lima to defend Castillo's election and dissuade Fujimori protesters.

Senior fellow of the Washington Office on Latin America Jo Marie Burt described the overturn attempts as "a slow-motion conspiracy to prevent Castillo from becoming president", with The Guardian reporting that if Castillo was prevented from becoming president by 28 July 2021, a new election would be initiated. Fujimori's statements about possibly overturning the election, along with her use of fake news and legal challenges, were also described as being inspired by the attempts to overturn the 2020 U.S. presidential election by former U.S. president Donald Trump. According to Cornell University professor of Latin American politics Kenneth Roberts, "[w]hen the credibility is called into question the way it has been by Trump and the Republicans in the U.S., it creates a bad example that other leaders and countries can follow, providing a template to change results they don't like."

On 18 June, former Supreme Court President Javier Villa Stein filed a complaint for protection by describing the ballot vote as "questioned", arguing an alleged "electoral process flawed by various acts that undermine the popular will" and asking the judiciary branch to "declare the election void." Lawyer Renán Galindo Peralta requested that it be rejected outright considering it inadmissible because it did not fall under the Organic Law of Elections and because the judicial branch lacked the powers to annul elections.

==== Claims of fraud ====
To avoid the questions of election legitimacy, election authorities in Peru approved the use of election monitoring. In total, one hundred and fifty observers (ninety-nine in Peru and fifty-one abroad) were approved to observe elections throughout Peru. The origin of the observers were from twenty-two different countries, with thirty-five observers from the Organization of American States, while others were from Argentina, Colombia, Costa Rica, Ecuador, El Salvador, Guatemala, Mexico, Panama, Paraguay, Spain, Switzerland, the United States, and Uruguay. Observer approval required providing election authorities observation plans; these plans included protocols to inform authorities of crimes, violations of electoral law or any complaints they collected. Observers were then responsible with providing an official, final report to authorities. According to OjoPúblico, "the observers carry out the review of the activities of election day, ranging from the installation of the voting tables, the conditioning of the secret chambers, the conformity of the ballots, the minutes, the amphorae and any other electoral material, to the counting, the counting of the vote and the transfer of the electoral records at the end of the day."

After Castillo took the lead during the ballot-counting process, Fujimori promoted false claims of electoral fraud. In a media event following election day, Fujimori alleged that a "series of irregularities" had occurred, presenting photographs and videos in an attempt to support her allegations, while also accusing Free Peru of attempting to "distort and delay" the election process. Fujimori argued that it consisted in the challenge of polling stations where Fujimori would register a greater number of votes than his opponent, previous training talks by Free Peru in which they ask their representatives to arrive early at the polling stations to ensure control of the polling stations where titular members did not attend and irregularities in the vote count. To support the complaints, Keiko's running mate, Luis Galarreta, assured that Free Peru did a "high number of challenges" to electoral acts in which Keiko was favoured so they could not be counted to the final estimate until they were evaluated first by the National Jury of Elections. According to the complaint, over 1 300 voting acts were challenged by Free Peru; however, the first claims were rebutted by national electoral entities. After the resolution of the challenged votes and the acts observed by the Special Electoral Juries, the National Office of Electoral Processes published the total results on 15 June, in which Pedro Castillo surpassed Keiko Fujimori in number of votes.

According to The Guardian, various international observers countered Fujimori's claims, stating that the election process was conducted in accordance with international standards. Observers from the Inter-American Union of Electoral Organizations, the Organization of American States, and the Progressive International denied any instances of widespread fraud and praised the accuracy of the elections. The Guardian also reported that analysts and political observers criticized Fujimori's remarks, noting that it made her appear desperate after losing her third presidential run in a ten-year period. Fernando Tuesta, political scientist from the Pontifical Catholic University of Peru, stated: "It's extremely regrettable that when the result is not favourable, that the candidate talks about fraud. It's terrible, ... They have been talking about fraud because they don't want to respect the result." On 9 June, Fujimori sought to have around 200,000 votes annulled and for 300,000 votes to be reviewed.

On 10 June, the Peruvian Prosecution asked for the detention of Keiko on charges of violating the conditional liberty that she was granted during the open criminal process against her. On 17 June, Fujimori repeated claims of voter fraud. On 28 June, Fujimori traveled to the Government Palace and personally delivered demands to President Francisco Sagasti to initiate an audit of the results by international entities. On 30 June, several members of the Popular Force party traveled to the OAS Building in Washington, D.C., to publicize the voter fraud claims, with sociologist Francesca Emanuele condemning them as "coup plotters" during a press conference. On 2 July, Sagasti rejected a request to audit the second round of the election, and Fujimori accused Sagasti of abdicating his "great responsibility to ensure fair elections." On 19 July, Fujimori admitted her defeat but reaffirmed that "votes were stolen" from her.

===== Montesinos and JNE scandal =====
On 25 June, former 2001 and 2016 presidential candidate Fernando Olivera revealed audio tapes, alleging that Vladimiro Montesinos, who was the right hand man to former President Alberto Fujimori currently serving a prison sentence for crimes committed during the Fujimori period, was behind the attempts for Keiko Fujimori to be declared as the winner of the second round against Castillo, including through the payment of bribes to electoral officials and influencing the National Jury of Elections. The National Penitentiary Institute and Peruvian Navy announced an investigation, confirming that Montesinos made two phone calls from Callao Naval Base where he is jailed, on 10 and 23 June to unauthorised persons coordinating the effort to overturn the election.

Further reports showed that Montesinos allegedly was able to make seventeen phone calls from a landline phone to retired military officer Pedro Rejas, reportedly suggesting to Rejas that bribes needed to be paid and that Fujimori's husband, an American, go to the United States embassy in Lima to present "documentation of the fraud" to the Office of Regional Affairs and Central Intelligence Agency. According to IDL-Reporteros, Montesinos suggests that the documentation would reach President Joe Biden and that his administration would condemn the election as interference from Cuba, Nicaragua, and Venezuela, subsequently giving Fujimori's claims of fraud more weight.

=== Reactions ===
==== Domestic ====
Lourdes Flores, leader of the Christian People's Party, which supported Fujimori in the election, argued carrying out her own analysis of certain electoral acts, concluding that there was a mechanism to "improperly incline the vote" in favor of Pedro Castillo. Rafael López Aliaga, former presidential candidate for Popular Renewal who supported Fujimori as well, argued that the second round or ballot should be repeated because "there is a fraud that cannot be covered up anymore". Alfredo Barnechea, former candidate for Popular Action, affirmed that the irregularities detected were "massive" and that therefore the ballot should be repeated with international observation or else whoever is elected "will not have any legitimacy."

Former Peruvian prime minister Salvador del Solar declared that "there is no legal basis to denounce fraud nor to request new elections." The Secretary General of the Transparency Civil Association, Iván Lanegra, declared that "there is no indication of fraud" in the Peruvian elections. Verónika Mendoza, former candidate who endorsed Castillo, described Popular Will's annulment requests as attempts to dismiss the electoral results and "hit democracy." Journalist César Hildebrandt said that by dismissing the election results, "what Keiko Fujimori is doing is equivalent to a soft coup", describing the allegations of Fujimori's alleged fraud as "Andean Trumpism."

On 23 June, Luis Arce, a judge on the National Jury of Elections (JNE), resigned and alleged bias on the jury which had rejected ten Fujimori requests to annul Castillo votes. On its Twitter account, JNE rejected Arce's allegation of bias as "offensive", and said its judges were not allowed to resign in the middle of reviews of cases, so he would be suspended instead, and a provisional replacement found "to avoid delaying our work." Castillo's Free Peru party said the resignation was aimed at "preventing the proclamation of Pedro Castillo, thereby ignoring the popular vote, breaking democracy and installing a coup d'état with silk gloves." In the wake of Arce's resignation, a lawyer representing Fujimori said that the government should consider asking the Organization of American States (OAS) to audit the electoral process, as was done during the 2019 Bolivian political crisis. The OAS stated that its mission to the country had not found any issues in the conduct of the election. Former candidate George Forsyth attributed it as part of the preparation of a "coup d'etat" and that Arce himself was "attacking democracy."

==== International ====
Leftist leaders in Latin America congratulated Castillo shortly after preliminary results were tallied. President of Argentina Alberto Fernández tweeted that he had spoken to the "President-elect" Castillo and that he wished to cooperate with him. President of Bolivia Luis Arce tweeted that "Bolivia joins the celebration of the Peruvian people", calling Castillo his "brother", and stating that the two would "continue the struggle for a tomorrow with justice and equality for the people." Evo Morales and Luiz Inácio Lula da Silva, former presidents of Bolivia and Brazil, respectively, also congratulated Castillo.

Ned Price, Spokesperson for the United States Department of State, described the elections as "a model of democracy", agreeing that it was necessary to give time to the electoral authorities to publish the results according to Peruvian law, while also stating: "We congratulate the Peruvian authorities for safely administering another round of free, fair, accessible and peaceful elections, even amid the significant challenges of the COVID-19 pandemic." The European Union described the election as "free and democratic."

Andrés Pastrana Arango, former President of Colombia and member of the international forum IDEA (Spanish: Iniciativa Democrática de España y las Américas), declared that there are "serious indications that Venezuela has its hands in the Peruvian electoral system", suggesting an international audit of the electoral results. The claim was rejected by the Peruvian National Office of Electoral Processes, which assured that the vote count was done transparently. Peruvian Nobel laureate residing in Spain Mario Vargas Llosa expressed his support for electoral authorities to carefully review the contested acts, saying that what is important is to have a president "that the majority of Peruvian voters has chosen and not a fraudulent president." Colombian president Iván Duque and Ecuadorian president Guillermo Lasso congratulated Castillo in July for his proclamation.

=== Public opinion ===
In late June, an IEP poll showed that thirty-one percent of participants believed in Fujimori's claims of fraud. A statistical analysis of the company Ipsos Peru on the results published by the National Office of Electoral Processes did not find evidence of an atypical distribution of votes to any candidate, neither in certain geographical areas nor for a particular candidate. In a survey carried out by Datum Internacional, 65% of respondents (both Pedro Castillo and Keiko Fujimori voters) believed that there were "signs" of fraud in the elections. A survey by the Institute of Peruvian Studies showed that 66% of participants considered that Castillo had won the election.
