= Daniel Salaverry =

Peruvian architect, businessman and politician

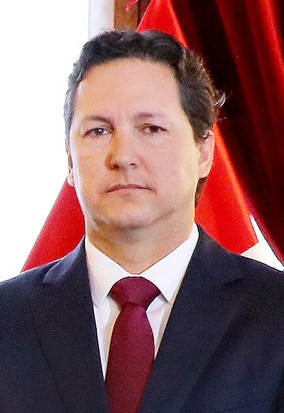
- Daniel Salaverry as President of the Congress in 2018

President of Congress
- In office 26 July 2018 – 27 July 2019
- Vice President: 1st Vice President; Leyla Chihuán; 2nd Vice President; Segundo Tapia; 3rd Vice President; Yeni Vilcatoma
- Preceded by: Luis Galarreta
- Succeeded by: Pedro Olaechea

Member of Congress
- In office 26 July 2016 – 30 September 2019
- Constituency: La Libertad

Provincial Councillor
- In office 1 January 2007 – 31 December 2010
- Constituency: Trujillo

Personal details
- Born: Daniel Enrique Salaverry Villa; 7 August 1972 (age 54) Trujillo, Peru
- Party: We Are Peru (2020-present)
- Other political affiliations: Popular Force (2016-2018); Peruvian Aprista Party (2002-2014)
- Education: Antenor Orrego Private University

Daniel Enrique Salaverry Villa (born 7 August 1972) is a Peruvian architect, businessman and politician. Between 2016 and 2019, he served in Congress representing the Department of La Libertad. Elected to Congress under the Fujimorist Popular Force party, he was the party's spokesperson for a year, and was President of the Congress from 2018 to 2019. He ran as a candidate for the presidency of Peru for the We Are Peru party in the 2021 general elections.

Salaverry unsuccessfully ran for Mayor of the Province of Trujillo twice. The first time, he ran in 2010 with the Peruvian Aprista Party, and the second with the Popular Force.

== Early life and education ==
Born in the northern city of Trujillo in 1972, he was enrolled in the Claretiano School for his elementary and high school education. He pursued studies in Architecture at the Antenor Orrego Private University, graduating with a Bachelor's degree.

== Political career ==
Salaverry was member of the Peruvian Aprista Party from 2002 to 2014. He later joined the Popular Force in 2014 and left in 2019.

=== Early political career ===
In 2006, he was elected to the Provincial Council of Trujillo. In 2010, he ran for Mayor of Trujillo, losing by a small margin to Alliance for Progress leader César Acuña, then-current Mayor running for reelection.

In 2014, he founded the "Democracy, Security and Values" Movement. Later that year, he allied with the Popular Force party in order to run for Mayor once again, this time losing against Elidio Espinoza Quispe, a former Police Colonel.

=== Congressman ===
In the 2016 elections, he was elected to the Congress representing the La Libertad Region under the Popular Force. He has held the position of Spokesperson of the Popular Force Parliamentary Group. He was ultimately elected as President of Congress for the annual term 2018-2019. In January 2019, he quit the Popular Force for discrepancies with his bench colleagues.

In July 2019, Salaverry joined the United for the Republic parliamentary group in order to be eligible to run for reelection as President of Congress. He was ultimately defeated by conservative leader Pedro Olaechea, who was supported by the entire Popular Force party. According to a survey by El Comercio-Ipsos, upon leaving the Board of Directors he dismissed his management with 28% citizen approval.

On September 3, 2019, the full congress approved his suspension for 120 days for allegedly having presented false information and adulterated images in his representation reports presented before the Legislature. The day after his suspension, the congressman from Popular Force, Ángel Neyra, filed a constitutional complaint against Salaverry for breach of the regulations of Congress and tried to put into debate the reinstatement of Kenji Fujimori, Guillermo Bocangel and Bienvenido Ramírez, other former members of Fuerza Popular sanctioned.

==== Distancing from Popular Force ====
On October 22, 2018, after many discrepancies with his colleagues on the bench, he requested a license from Fuerza Popular in order to maintain impartiality in the decisions he made as head of the Congress.

=== 2021 presidential campaign ===
On 5 September 2020, he announced his official candidacy for the presidency of the Republic for the 2021 general elections, this time under the We Are Peru party in which he had been affiliated since June of the same year. On September 8 of the same year, within the framework of the reform proposal to advance the general elections proposed by President Martín Vizcarra, Salaverry revealed that Fuerza Popular had the intention of advancing the electoral elections since 2018, a month after he assumed the presidency of the Congress. In October 2020, Salaverry registered his candidacy for the Presidency for the We Are Peru party. Former President Martín Vizcarra announced on 27 November 2020 that he would campaign for a seat in congress for the 2021 general election, joining the We Are Peru party, a party that voted for his removal just weeks before. Salaverry, who was running as a presidential candidate for We Are Peru, welcomed Vizcarra to the party. If elected into congress, Vizcarra would obtain parliamentary immunity from the investigations that resulted with his removal from the presidency.

In March 2021, he declared that part of his program involves radicalizing immigration control and expelling the undocumented, generating rejection on social networks. Salaverry assured that he does not care about the criticism that rains him for his statement. Later, after being rebuked by a Venezuelan on Tacna Avenue, in the area of Lima, he responded in a confrontational manner.

As of 2021, he had an open investigation in the Public Ministry after being accused of falsifying his reports during his tenure as congressman.

== Controversies ==
The Prosecutor's Office attributes to him having used Congress' resources, destined for his week of representation, for personal purposes.
