= 2010 Peruvian FONAVI funds referendum =

| 3 October 2010 |
- Do you approve the draft Law for the Refund of FONAVI money to the Workers who contributed to it?

Results
| Choice | Votes | % |
|---|---|---|
| Yes | 9,115,867 | 66.47% |
| No | 4,597,659 | 33.53% |
| Valid votes | 13,713,526 | 83.78% |
| Invalid or blank votes | 2,654,792 | 16.22% |
| Total votes | 16,368,318 | 100.00% |
| Registered voters/turnout | 19,595,277 | 83.53% |

A referendum on the restitution of FONAVI funds was held in Peru on 3 October 2010. The proposals were approved by 66% of voters.

== Background ==
The Fondo Nacional de Vivienda (FONAVI) was established on 30 June 1979 by the Peruvian government as a fund for housing construction, to which all employees had to contribute. However, President Alberto Fujimori later dissolved the fund, which had reached 9.565 billion sols in value, in order to pay off national debt. On 21 January 2002 the Constitutional Court declared the dissolution illegal.

Former contributors to the fund collected 2.3 million signatures for a law to refund the money, of which 1,532,551 were validated. However, the National Electoral Commission (JNE) declared in 2006 that a referendum would not be possible as Article 32 of the constitution prohibited referendums on tax issues. On 3 September the Constitutional Court ruled that the FONAVI fund was not a tax, and that the referendum was legal. However, the JNE continued to refuse to hold the referendum. The Constitutional Court reaffirmed their judgement on 1 August 2008 and ordered the JNE to set a date. Another ruling was made on 7 October 2008 and again on 1 May 2009. In 2009 it was decided to hold the referendum alongside local elections in 2010.

== Results ==
| Choice | Votes | % |
|---|---|---|
| For | 9,115,867 | 66.47 |
| Against | 4,597,659 | 33.53 |
| Invalid/blank votes | 2,654,792 | – |
| Total | 16,368,318 | 100 |
| Registered voters/turnout | 19,595,277 | 83.53 |
Source: Direct Democracy
