= La Victoria District, Lima =

District of Lima, Peru

La Victoria
- District
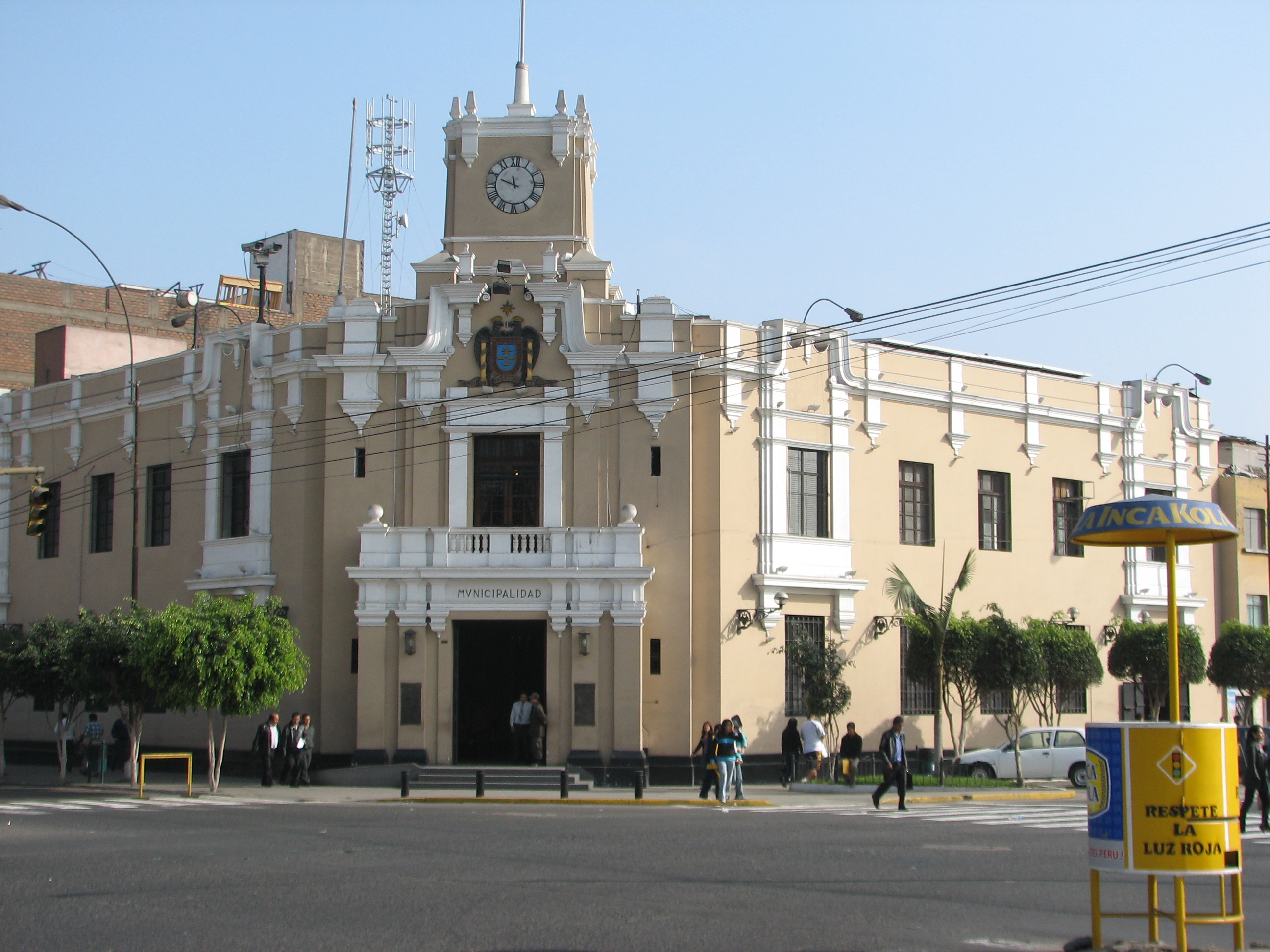

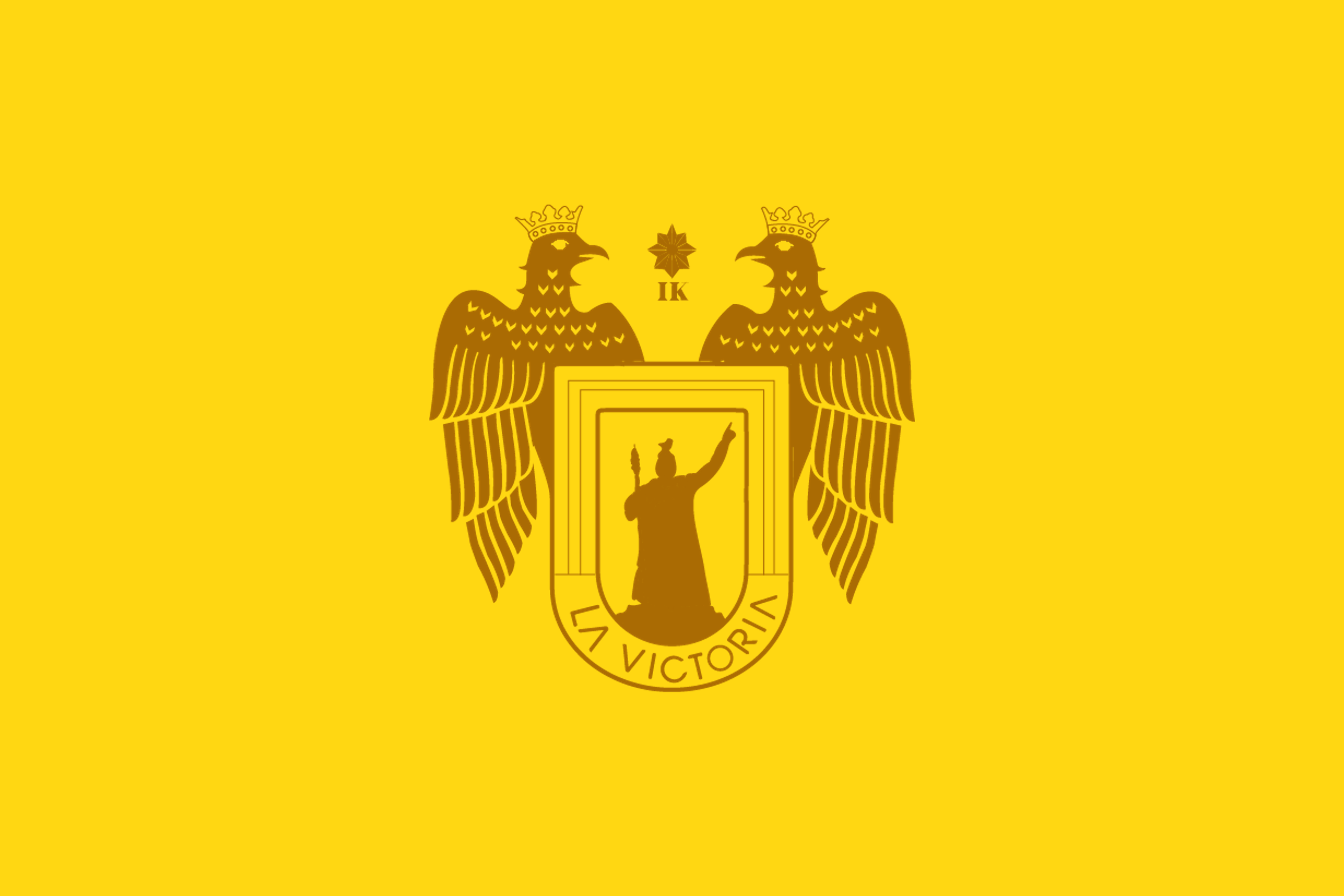
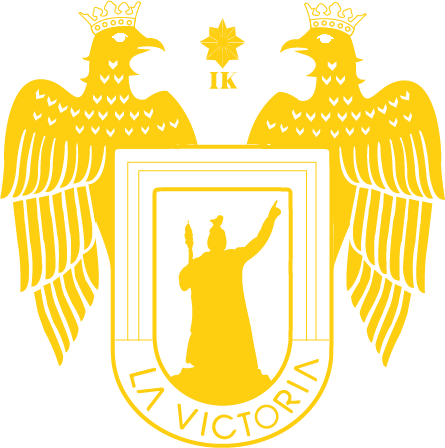
- Flag Coat of arms

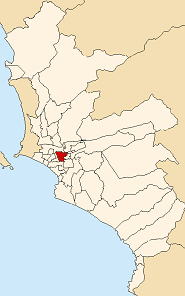
- Location in Lima Province
- Coordinates: 12°3′54″S 76°1′52″W
- Country: Peru
- Department: Lima
- Province: Lima
- Founded: February 2, 1920
- Capital: La Victoria
- Subdivisions: 1 populated center

Government
  - Mayor: Rubén Cano (2023-2026)

Area
  - Total: 8.74 km^{2} (3.37 sq mi)
- Elevation: 133 m (436 ft)

Population (2023)
  - Total: 195,620
  - Density: 22,400/km^{2} (58,000/sq mi)
- Time zone: UTC-5 (PET)
- UBIGEO: 150115
- Website: munilavictoria.gob.pe

La Victoria is a district of Lima, Peru. Located to the south of the city's historic centre, it was created as a working class district in 1920, although its southern sectors later took on a residential and commercial character. From the administrative point of view of the Catholic Church in Peru, it forms part of the Archdiocese of Lima's Episcopal Vicariate V.

The current mayor of La Victoria is Rubén Dioscorides Andrés Cano Altez.

== History ==
Until 1920, when it was made into a separate district, La Victoria was separate from Miraflores, Lima and Ate districts.

Industry began to grow in 1889, when the Italian Bartolomé Boggio and the American Enrique Price founded the Santa Catalina Fabric Factory.

With the arrival of migrants from the interior of the country seeking work in the capital, the capital's two economic centers – La Parada for edible products and Gamarra for textile products – were created.

== District structure ==
La Victoria is located south of the historic center of Lima. It is bordered to the north by the district of Lima through Miguel Grau Avenue and part of 28 de Julio Avenue; to the east by the El Agustino district through Cerro San Pedro, the San Luis district through Nicolás Arriola Avenue and part of Aviación Avenue, and the San Borja district through Luis Aldana Avenue and part of Canada Avenue; to the south by the district of San Isidro through Javier Prado Este Avenue and part of Paseo de la República Avenue; and to the west by the Lince and Lima districts through the entire Paseo de la República Avenue. The main roads in this district are Manco Cápac Avenues (the oldest in the district), México, Isabel la Católica, Parinacochas, Iquitos, 28 de Julio, Aviación, Nicolás Arriola, Canada, Nicolás Ayllón and part of Circunvalación Avenue.

La Victoria has a great commercial focus. The area of the district located north of Mexico Avenue is primarily commercial; in it the Gamarra Emporium stands out, which is the headquarters of the largest textile industry in Lima and has numerous stores, shopping centers and clothing workshops mainly in the vicinity of Agustín Gamarra Street. The food markets of La Parada and the Fruit Market also operate in this area. In addition, several commercial and interprovincial land transport companies have their headquarters in this sector.

To the south of Avenida México, residential areas of a medium-high socioeconomic level are predominant, such as Balconcillo and Santa Catalina. The first is characterized by its central park called Unión Panamericana and borders the avenues México, Parinacochas, Canada and Paseo de la República, while the second is characterized by its rapid real estate development which has increased the number of high-rise housing buildings.

Among its most important educational centers are the Pedro A. Labarthe, Felipe Santiago Salaverry, Sagrada Familia, Paul Harris and Isabel La Católica national schools. The first national school, formerly called Nuestra Señoras de Las Victorias, and the José Granda men's school, currently called República de Panamá, is located near the Plaza Manco Capac and is the oldest school in the district. There are also private schools such as América de La Victoria, San Ricardo, Reina de las Américas (Balconcillo), San Norberto (Santa Catalina), Nuestra Señora del Pilar (Santa Catalina). There are also the Professional Academic School of Obstetrics of the San Fernando School of Medicine at the National University of San Marcos, the José Pardo Technological Institute, the headquarters of the Peruvian Institute of Nuclear Energy and the Institute of Graphic Arts.

The main Catholic church is Nuestra Señora de las Victorias, located along with the district municipality's headquarters in the central Plaza Manco Cápac, whose monument was donated in 1926 by the Japanese colony in Peru on the occasion of the centenary of Peru's independence. It also has other churches such as those of San Ricardo, in Matute (which has a public swimming pool), San Antonio María Claret, Nuestra Señora del Buen Consejo, San Norberto (consecrated on July 15, 1963, in the Santa Catalina urbanization), in addition to the Our Lady of Guadalupe Parish Sanctuary in the Balconcillo urbanization.

Among the district's hospital infrastructure is the old Hospital Obrero, today known as the Guillermo Almenara Irigoyen National Hospital, which belongs to the Social Security of Peru and is located on Avenida Grau. Additionally, La Victoria has a shelter for the underprivileged called Hogar de la Paz that is administered by the Missionaries of Charity.

A place of interest in the district is the Calvetti house located at the intersection of Hipólito Unanue and Iquitos Avenue. It features the longest balcony in Peru, with a length of 99.22 m (325.5 ft) and which was built in 1924.

== Authorities ==
=== Municipal ===
- 2023-2026
  - Mayor: Rubén Dioscorides Andrés Cano Altez, from Popular Renewal.
- 2020–2022
  - Mayor: Luis Gutiérrez Salvatierra, from We Are Peru (Somos Perú; SP).
- 2019–2020
  - Mayor: George Forsyth Sommer, from We Are Peru (SP).
- 2015–2018
  - Mayor: Elías Cuba Bautista, from National Solidarity (Partido Solidaridad Nacional; SN). (vacant)
  - Acting mayor: Harry Max Castro Durand (SN)
  - Council members: Harry Max Castro Durand (SN), Víctor Primo Contreras Santa Cruz (SN), Augusto Valladares Sotelo (SN), Meuner Rosa Rojas Palacios (SN), José Luis Melgar Ramírez (SN), Mesías Máximo Gonzales Sánchez (SN), Renzo Herrera Granda (SN), Joaquín Reynaldo Albarracin Ramos (Peru Secure Homeland), Martín Jorge Luis Guevara Martínez (Christian People's Party), Marco Antonio Castro León (American Popular Revolutionary Alliance), Flor De María Fernández Ñique (We Are Peru).
- 2011–2014
  - Mayor: Alberto Sánchez-Aizcorbe Carranza, from Christian People's Party – National Unity (Partido Popular Cristiano – Unidad Nacional; PPC – UN).
  - Council members: Milagros del Carmen Manchego Bustíos (PPC – UN), George Patrick Forsyth Sommer (PPC – UN), Norma Yolanda Hoyos de Valcárcel (PPC – UN), Ismael Yucra Paquiyauri (PPC – UN), Irineo Félix Bonafón Arambuena (PPC – UN), Martín Jorge Luis Guevara Martínez (PPC – UN), Yheason Steve Nina Chipana (PPC – UN), Joaquín Reynaldo Albarracin Ramos (Radical Change), Julián Américo Chávez Luna (National Restoration), César Rafael Ibarra Nureña (We Are Peru), Olga Isabel Ramos Gutiérrez (Fonavistas of Peru).
- 2007–2010
  - Mayor: Alberto Sánchez-Aizcorbe Carranza
  - Council members: Jesús Cesáreo Tan Kuong (acting mayor), Joe Zanabria Soberón, Jorge Luis Bartra Souza, Óscar Luis Labenita Carlín, José Luis Melgar Ramírez, Norma Yolanda Hoyos de Valcárcel, Irineo Félíx Bonafon Arambuena, Miguel Reynaldo Morales Porta, Martín Jorge Luis Guevara Martínez, Evelin Orcón Huamán, César Daniel Guerrero Díaz.
- 1929–1930
  - Mayor: Manuel Augusto de la Torre Diaz; elected at 23 years of age.
- 1920
  - Juan Carbone (First Mayor)

=== Police ===
- Commissar: Cmdte. PNP Carlos Eduardo Díaz Quepuy.

=== Religious ===
- Nuestra Señora de las Victorias Parish
  - Priest: Humberto Eduardo Giusti Garro
- Nuestra Señora de Guadalupe Parish
  - Priest: Rafael Reátegui Cabrera
- San Ricardo – U.V. Matute Parish
  - Priest: Augusto Meloni Navarro

== Subdivisions ==
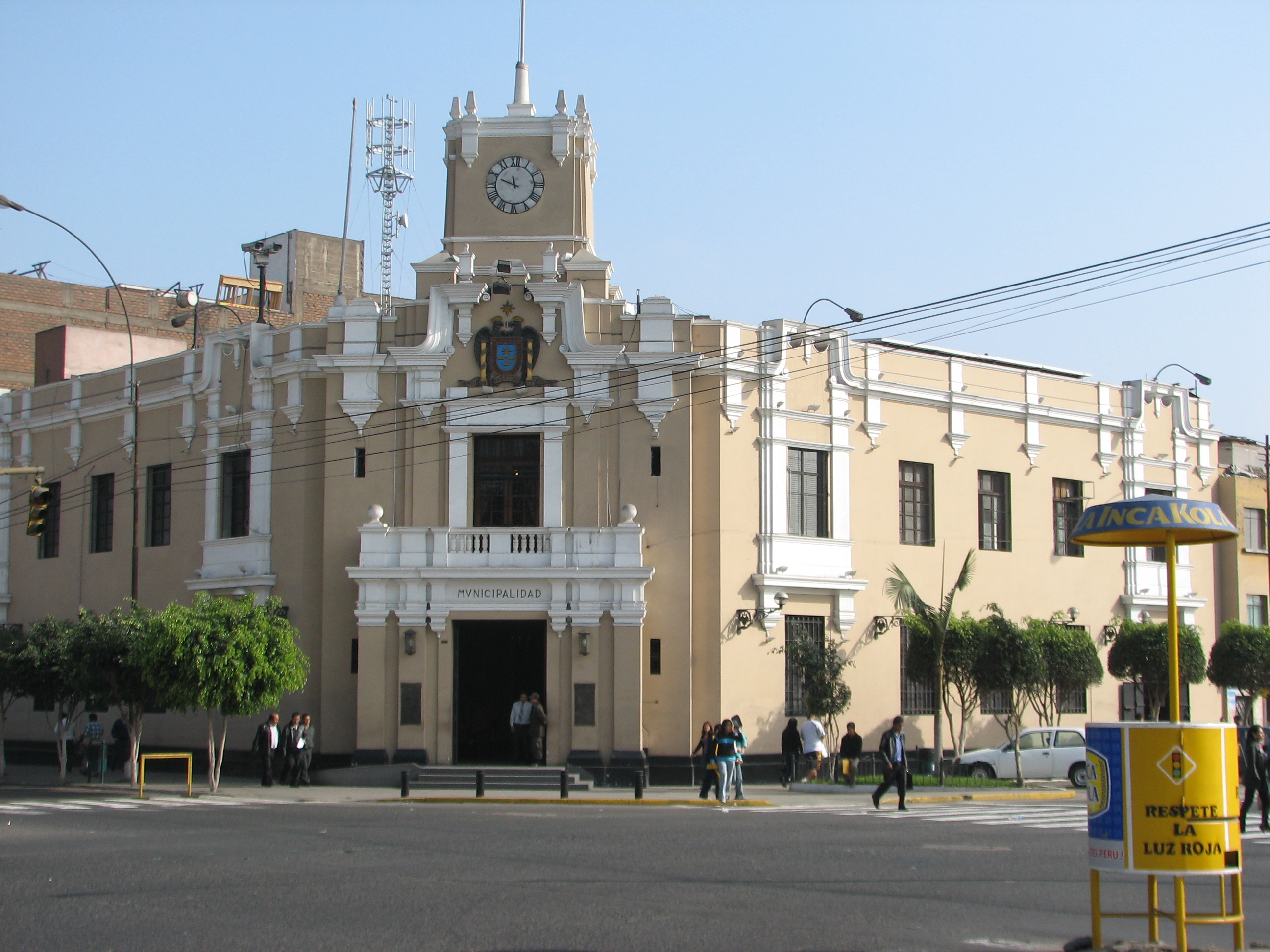
Municipal Palace

La Victoria has several sections:

- La Victoria proper extends from Miguel Grau avenue in the north to Mexico avenue in the south and from Paseo de la República Expressway in the west to San Pablo avenue in the east. It is the most populous sector and it is filled with mom and pop stores, although Iquitos avenue has a thriving auto parts sector. Gamarra Street is known in the entire city as a steady, if poor, clothier's row. Worker's Hospital, now known as Guillermo Almenara Irigoyen National Hospital, belonging to the Social Security System (ESSALUD), is located on Miguel Grau avenue.
- Balconcillo, immediately south of Mexico avenue running toward Canadá avenue, is slightly more residential, although it has some industrial offices, such as the local Ajinomoto and Xerox licensee offices. It is the location of the country's first coup d'état.
- Santa Catalina, running south from Canadá avenue toward Javier Prado avenue (marking the boundaries with San Isidro and San Borja districts) is the most residential and affluent section of all the district. It has been part of La Victoria since 1921 and was previously part of Miraflores district (today it borders they district of San Isidro).
- The areas around the mountain (hill), Cerro San Cosme and El Pino, are completely integrated into the hills in the northeast part of the district. Sometimes they are counted as part of Victoria, but they comprise their own street. This sector is known as The Parade, from the nickname of the popular market products wholesale as well as several bus terminals located there now.

La Victoria is home to one of the most popular football teams in Peru, Alianza Lima. The Alejandro Villanueva Stadium is located near the housing project Hooch in the southern part of La Victoria. Today's La Victoria offers residents and visitors parks and cultural attractions.

== Geography ==
La Victoria is part of Lima's Cono Centro, an unofficial subregion of the city.

=== Boundaries ===
It borders to the north and northeast with the district of Lima, to the east with the district of San Luis, to the southeast with the district of San Borja, to the south with the district of San Isidro, and to the west with the district of Lince and again with the Lima district.

=== Climate ===
Climate data for Lima
Month	Jan	Feb	Mar	Apr	May	Jun	Jul	Aug	Sep	Oct	Nov	Dec	Year
Record high °F	79	79	79	75	72	68	66	64	66	68	72	75	72
Record high °C	26	26	26	24	22	20	19	18	19	20	22	24	22
Average precipitation days	1	1	0	0	1	2	3	3	3	2	2	0	16
Average rainy days	4	2	3	2	5	11	12	15	13	7	5	3	82
Average relative humidity (%)	85	80	80	85	85	85	85	85	85	85	85	85	84.2
Mean monthly sunshine hours	179.1	169	139.2	184	116.4	50.6	28.6	32.3	37.3	65.3	89	139.2	1,284
Source: Weatherbase (Temperature, precipitation and humidity). and Universidad Complutense de Madrid (Sunlight)

== Culture ==
=== Festivities ===
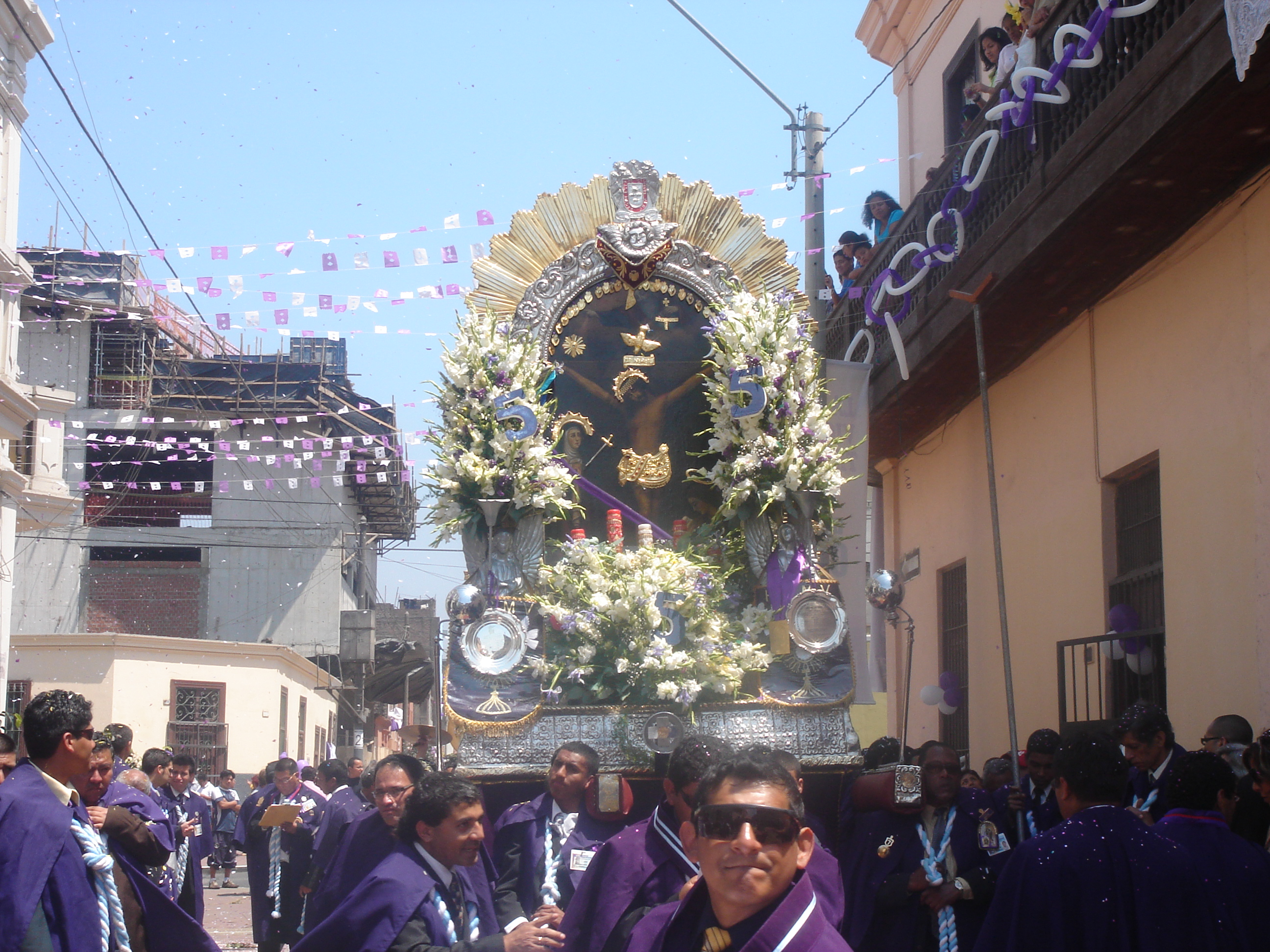
Procession of Lord of Miracles of La Victoria District, Nov 2008

- November: Lord of Miracles
