= Mayors of Trujillo, Peru =

Mayor of Trujillo
- Coat of arms of Trujillo
- Incumbent; Mario Reyna Rodríguez since January 8, 2024
- Seat: Municipal Palace
- Inaugural holder: Rodrigo Lozano; Blas de Atienza
- Formation: March 5, 1535
- Website: Official site

The following is a list of mayors (alcaldes) of Trujillo since the city's foundation in 1534.

Under Spanish rule, the city's cabildo was headed by an Alcalde ordinario. (Note: Under this system, the mayorship was shared by an alcalde de primer voto (roughly "first mayor") and an alcalde de segundo (roughly "second mayor")) Currently, the city's local government is under the jurisdiction of the Provincial Municipality of Trujillo, which administers the province as a whole.

The aforementioned current system of government dates back to 1963, with the creation of the local government system under the first presidency of Fernando Belaúnde. From its creation until 1998, with an exemption between 1968 and 1980 due to military rule, the term of office was three years. Mayors have since been elected every four years.

The installation of the first cabildo in Trujillo was held on March 5, 1535. The first mayors were named by Francisco Pizarro, and they were Rodrigo Lozano and Blas de Atienza.

== List of mayors ==
Name		Office started	Office ended	Party affiliation
First vote	Second vote	Office started	Office ended	Party affiliation
Rodrigo Lozano	Blas de Atienza	March 5, 1535		—
1839–1857: Municipalities replaced by Municipal Intendancies
Dr. José de Porturas y Verde		January 1, 1900	June 22, 1900	—N/a
Alfredo Pinillos Hoyle		June 1900	December 17, 1900	—N/a
Luis José de Orbegoso		January 1, 1901	August 23, 1901	—N/a
Wenceslao Pinillos Rosell		September 18, 1901		—N/a
Alberto Larco Herrera		January 1, 1903	September 18, 1903	—N/a
Dr. Santiago E. Uceda		January 8, 1904	December 31, 1904	—N/a
Dr. Enrique Blondet Moyano		January 13, 1905	May 5, 1905	—N/a
Alberto Larco Herrera		May 27, 1905		—N/a
Victor Larco Herrera		1913		—N/a
Guillermo Larco Cox		January 1, 1964	December 31, 1966	APRA–UNO
Guillermo Larco Cox		January 1, 1967	December 31, 1969	APRA–UNO
Jorge Torres Vallejo		January 1, 1981	December 31, 1983	APRA
Luis Santa María Calderón		January 1, 1984	December 31, 1986	APRA
Miriam Pilco Deza		January 1, 1987	December 31, 1989	APRA
José Humberto Murgia Zannier		January 1, 1990	December 31, 1992	APRA
José Humberto Murgia Zannier		January 1, 1993	December 31, 1995	APRA
José Humberto Murgia Zannier		January 1, 1996	December 31, 1998	L. I. № 11
José Humberto Murgia Zannier		January 1, 1999	December 31, 2002	APRA
José Humberto Murgia Zannier		January 1, 2003	May 18, 2006	APRA
Martín Sifuentes Palacios		May 18, 2006	December 31, 2006	APRA
Cesar Acuña Peralta		January 1, 2007	December 31, 2010	APP
Cesar Acuña Peralta		January 1, 2011	April 23, 2014	APP
Gloria Montenegro Figeroa		April 23, 2014	December 31, 2014	APP
Elidio Espinoza Quispe		January 1, 2015	December 31, 2018	DS&H
Daniel Marcelo Jacinto		January 1, 2019	August 1, 2020	APP
José Ruiz Vega		August 1, 2020	December 31, 2022	APP
Arturo Fernández Bazán		January 1, 2023	January 8, 2024	Somos Perú
Mario Reyna Rodríguez		January 8, 2024	Incumbent	Somos Perú

== See also ==
- Trujillo, Peru
