= Alliance for the Great Change =

Alliance for the Great Change – PPK Alianza por el Gran Cambio – PPK
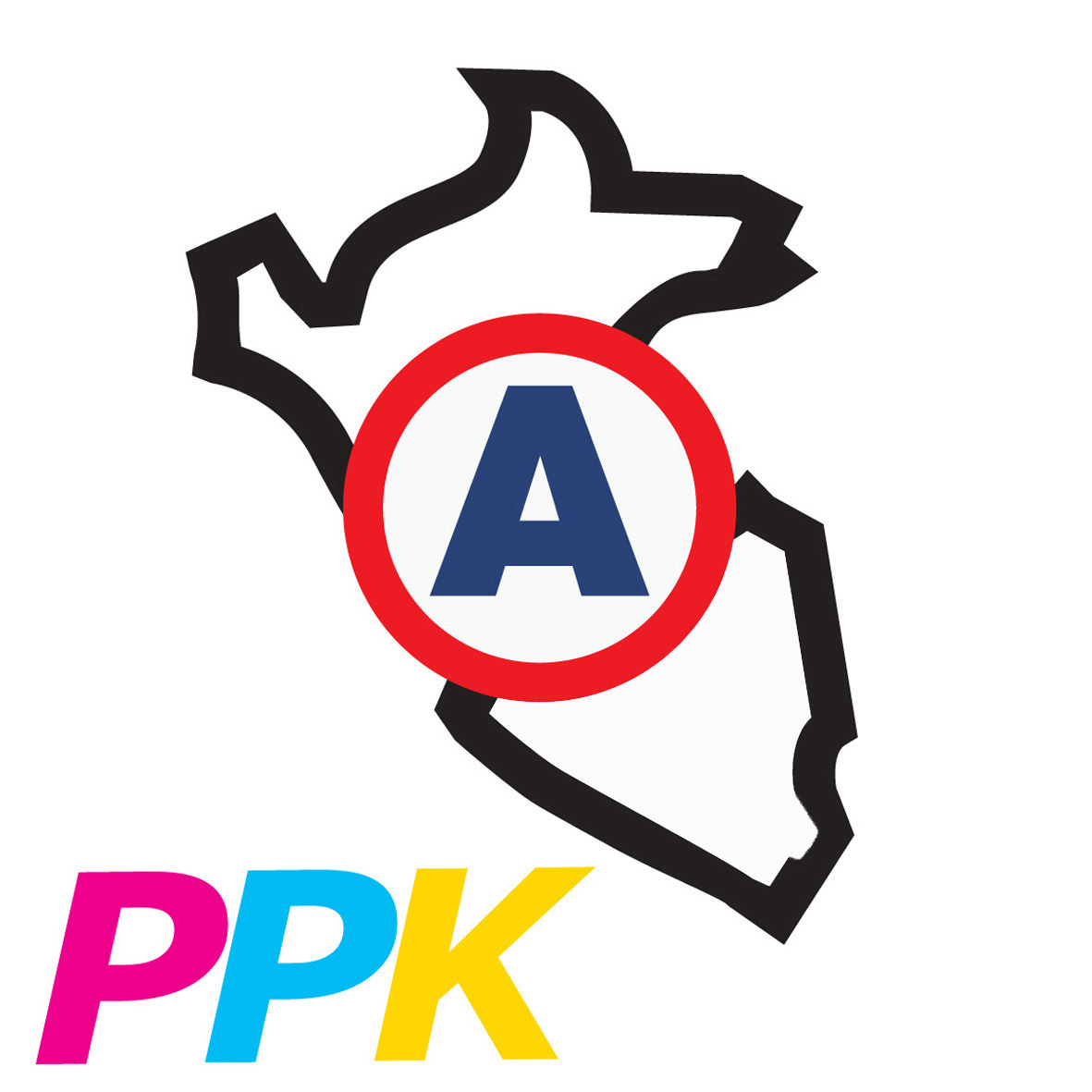
- Abbreviation: APGC - PPK
- Leader: Pedro Pablo Kuczynski
- Founded: December 2010
- Dissolved: August 2013
- Succeeded by: Peruvians for Change, Popular Alliance
- Ideology: Christian democracy
- Political position: Centre-right
- Colors: Pink, blue, yellow

The Alliance for the Great Change—PPK (Spanish: Alianza por el Gran Cambio – PPK) was an electoral alliance in Peru formed for the 2011 general election to promote the presidential candidacy of Pedro Pablo Kuczynski ("PPK").

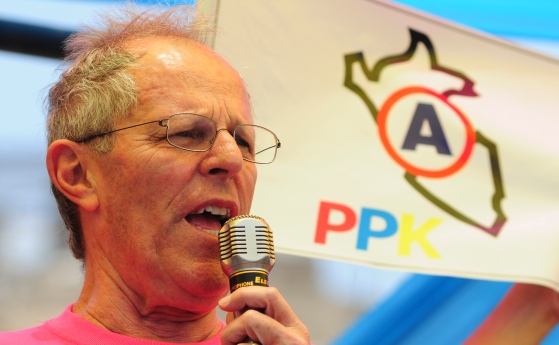
Pedro Pablo Kuczynski at an Alliance for the Great Change rally in December 2010

== Constituent Parties ==
- Christian People's Party (Partido Popular Cristiano, PPC), Christian democratic and conservative, chaired by Lourdes Flores
- Alliance for Progress (Alianza para el Progreso, APP), Conservative, led by César Acuña
- National Restoration (Restauración Nacional, RN), Evangelical Christian and social conservative, led by Humberto Lay
- Peruvian Humanist Party (Partido Humanista Peruano, PHP), humanist (center), led by Yehude Simon

Pedro Pablo Kuczynski himself was a non-partisan.

In the 2006 election, the Christian People's Party had led the alliance National Unity, the Humanists had been part of the Decentralization Coalition, the Alliance for Progress had participated separately. RN participated separately in the elections and had formed a parliamentary alliance with the Center Front after the elections.

== 2011 election ==
In the congressional election on April 10, the alliance won 14.42% of the popular vote and obtained 12 out of 130 seats, making them the fourth largest group in parliament. In the elections for the five Peruvian members of the Andean Parliament, they won 13.94% and obtained 1 representative to the Andean Parliament.

Kuczynski's running mates were Máximo San Román, former First Vice President under former President Alberto Fujimori who left the Fujimorist Cambio 90 and was then considered close to the National Restoration Party for First Vice President, and Marisol Pérez Tello (Christian People's Party) for Second Vice President.

"PPK", after a very personalist campaign, won 18.51% of the presidential votes, placing him third, but failed to qualify for the second round.

For the runoff Kuczynski, San Román and Lay endorsed right-wing candidate Keiko Fujimori of Force 2011, while dissenting humanist Simon supported left-wing Ollanta Humala of Peru Wins.

In campaign, the alliance used the colors shocking pink, light blue and yellow.

== Dissolution ==
In August 2013 several parliamentarians left the alliance's benches in parliament, leaving only with seven members. The parliamentary group was then renamed to "PPC–APP" (Christian People's Party-Alliance for Progress group).

For the 2016 general election, the alliance was not revived. Instead, Pedro Pablo Kuczynski launched the Peruvians for Change (Peruanos por el Kambio) party; the PPC joined the centre-left APRA party in the "Popular Alliance" led by ex-president Alan García; the APP leads an alliance called the "Alliance for the Progress of Peru" with National Restoration and We Are Peru, nominating its party leader César Acuña as its presidential candidate (who was disqualified before the election took place); the Humanist Party runs on its own, fielding party leader Yehude Simon (who withdrew before the election took place, due to low support at polls).

== Electoral history ==
=== Presidential election ===
Year	Candidate	Coalition	Votes	Percentage	Outcome
2011	Pedro Pablo Kuczynski	Alliance for the Great Change APP-PPC-RN-PHP	2 711 450	18.51	3rd

=== Election to the Congress of the Republic ===
Election	Votes	%	Number of seats	▲/▼	Position
2011	1 851 080	14.4%	12 / 130	▲12	Minority
