= Choquehuanca =

Choquehuanca is a surname. Notable people with the surname include:

- Ana María Choquehuanca (born 1958), Peruvian politician, businesswoman, and economist
- David Choquehuanca (born 1961), Bolivian politician
