= Luis Valdez Farías =

Peruvian politician

President of Congress
- Acting; 10 November 2020 – 15 November 2020
- Vice President: 1st Vice President; Himself; 2nd Vice President; Guillermo Aliaga; 3rd Vice President; María Teresa Cabrera
- Preceded by: Manuel Merino
- Succeeded by: Rocío Silva-Santisteban (acting)

First Vice President of Congress
- In office 16 March 2020 – 15 November 2020
- President: Manuel Merino
- Preceded by: Karina Beteta
- Succeeded by: José Luis Ancalle (acting)

Member of Congress
- In office 16 March 2020 – 26 July 2021
- Constituency: La Libertad

Secretary General of Alliance for Progress
- Incumbent
- Assumed office 18 October 2019
- Preceded by: Luis Iberico Núñez

4th Governor of La Libertad Region
- In office 12 October 2015 – 31 December 2018
- Lieutenant: Julio Manuel Miyamoto Saito
- Preceded by: César Acuña Peralta
- Succeeded by: Manuel Llempén Coronel

4th Lieutenant Governor of La Libertad Region
- In office 1 January 2015 – 12 October 2015
- Governor: César Acuña Peralta
- Preceded by: Mónica Sánchez Minchola
- Succeeded by: Juan Manuel Miyamoto Saito

Personal details
- Born: Luis Alberto Valdez Farías; 2 April 1979 (age 47) Bellavista, Piura, Peru
- Party: Alliance for Progress (2013–present)
- Education: César Vallejo University (LL.B.); National University of Trujillo (M.A.)

Luis Alberto Valdez Farías (born 2 April 1979) is a Peruvian politician. He is a Congressman representing La Libertad for the 2020–2021 term, and belongs to the Alliance for Progress party.

== Biography ==
Valdez Farías is a lawyer from the César Vallejo University. He has a master's degree in law with a Mention in Labor Law and Social Security from the National University of Trujillo.

He worked in the Provincial Municipality of Trujillo as Municipal Manager between 2010 and 2014 and Manager of Legal Advice between 2007 and 2010. He was an advisor to the César Vallejo University between 2000 and 2014.

== Political career ==
=== Lieutenant Governor of La Libertad and Governor of La Libertad ===
Entering politics in the 2014 regional elections, he was elected Lieutenant Governor of La Libertad Region and served from January 2015 until governor César Acuña Peralta resigned in October 2015, in order to run for president in the 2016 general election under the Alliance for the Progress of Peru coalition in which, he was disqualified on 9 March 2016. He thus served as Governor throughout the 2015–2018 term and left office on 31 December 2018.

=== Congressman ===
In the 2020 snap elections, Valdez was elected to Congress, representing the La Libertad Region. Valdez served as the Interim President of Congress from 10 to 15 November 2020, following the removal of the previous President, Martín Vizcarra the subsequent constitutional succession of Manuel Merino to that position, which required him leaving office as the President of Congress. As his first deputy, Valdez assumed the position in an acting capacity.

During the second presidential vacancy process against Vizcarra, Valdéz voted in favor of the declaration of moral incapacity against Martín Vizcarra. The vacancy was approved by 105 parliamentarians on November 9, 2020.

=== Party politics ===
On party level, he serves as Secretary General of Alliance for Progress since October 2019.
