= Elidio Espinoza =

Peruvian politician (1955–2021)

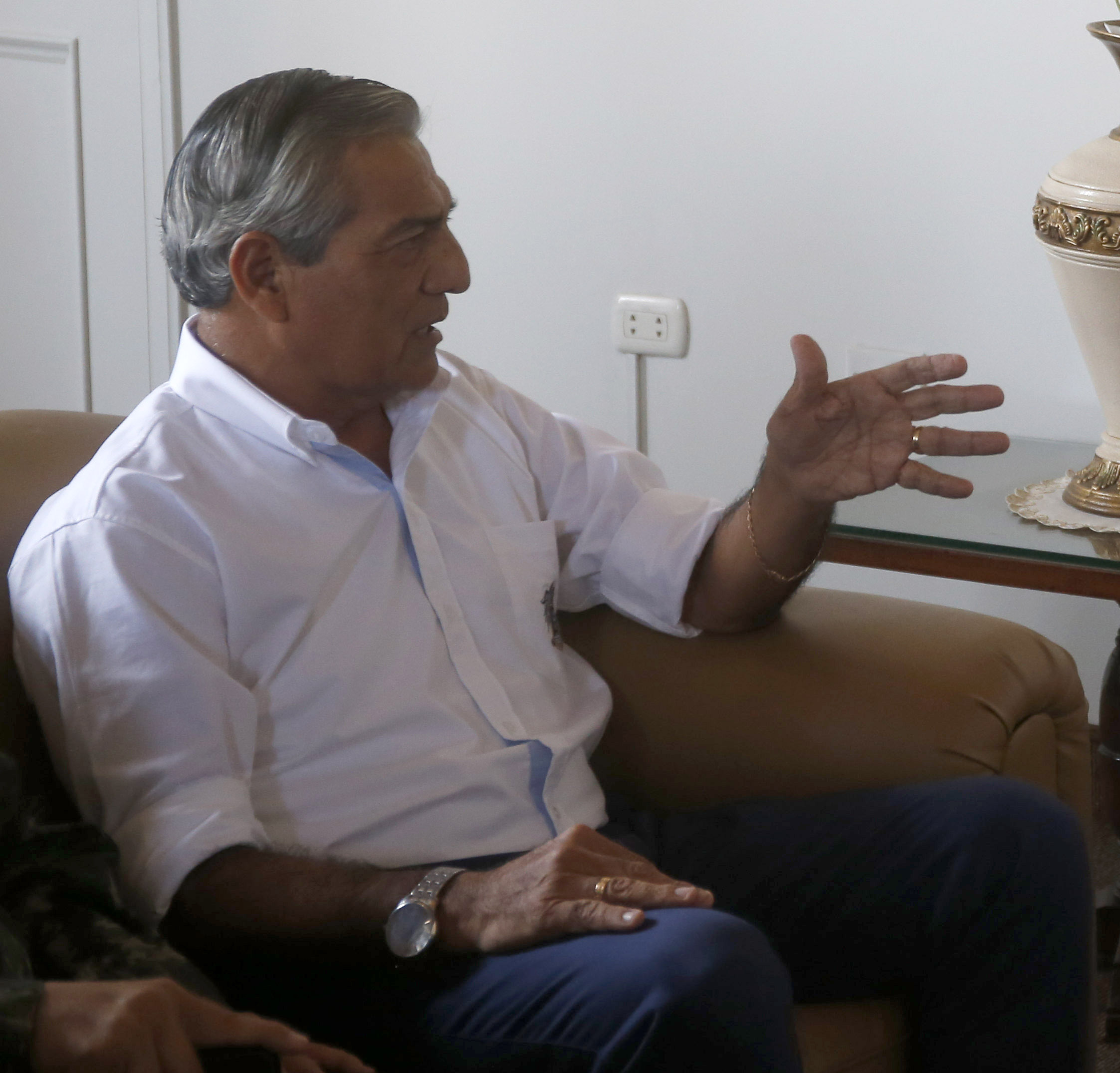

Mayor of Trujillo
- In office 1 January 2015 – 31 December 2018
- Preceded by: Gloria Montenegro Figueroa
- Succeeded by: Daniel Marcelo Jacinto

President of Movimiento Regional para el Desarrollo con Seguridad y Honradez
- In office 2014–2021

Personal details
- Born: 5 May 1955 Chepén, Peru
- Died: 3 April 2021 (aged 65) La Esperanza, Peru
- Political party: Movimiento Regional para el Desarrollo con Seguridad y Honradez

Elidio Espinoza (5 May 1955 – 3 April 2021) was a Peruvian politician and colonel, who served on the force of the National Police of Peru.

== Biography ==
To make money as a child, Espinoza worked as a street vendor before graduating from the Carlos Gutiérrez Noriega school. He moved to Lima, where he studied at the Officers' School of the National Police of Peru. He became leader of the Emergency Squad Trujillo before joining the La Libertad Bar Association as a lawyer and earning a master's degree in research and teaching. He was married to Regina Prado, with whom he had three children: Regina Paola, María Claudia and, Carlos Elidio.

In 2014, Espinoza and his wife, Regina, founded the Movimiento Regional para el Desarrollo con Seguridad y Honradez party. In 2014, he ran for Mayor of Trujillo as well as a seat on the Regional Government of La Libertad. He was elected Mayor of Trujillo, serving from 1 January 2015 to 31 December 2018. He also served as Vice-President of the Asociación de Municipalidades del Perú from 2015 to 2016.

The legal case against Espinoza's time as a policeman began in 2007 due to the abuse of authority to alleged criminals Víctor Enríquez Lozano, Carlos Mariños Ávila, Ronald Reyes Saavedra and Marco Quispe Gonzáles in October of that year in the El Porvenir District. He was acquitted on 27 December 2011, and he won appeals on 20 April 2012, 23 July 2013, 23 January 2014, and 20 October 2016, before its annulment on 28 August 2017. On 16 September 2019, the Superior Court of Justice of La Libertad sentenced him and seven other policemen to 30 years in prison, as well as a payment of 100,000 soles to the families of those killed. Because he was not with other officers in the Superior Court, he denounced the sentence the following day in a press conference. However, his sentence was suspended until his death.

Elidio Espinoza died of COVID-19 in La Esperanza on 3 April 2021, at the age of 65.
