= National Victory =

National Victory Victoria Nacional
- Abbreviation: VN
- President: George Forsyth
- Secretary-General: John Eliot Fernández de Paredes Silva
- Founder: Humberto Lay (as National Restoration)
- Founded: December 2020
- Preceded by: National Restoration
- Ideology: Christian democracy; Social conservatism; Economic liberalism; Anti-communism
- Political position: Centre-right
- Seats in Congress: 0 / 130
- Governorships: 0 / 25
- Regional Councillors: 0 / 274
- Province Mayorships: 0 / 196
- District Mayorships: 0 / 1,874

National Victory (Spanish: Victoria Nacional, VN), is a Peruvian political party. Founded in late-2020, the party is the successor of the former National Restoration Party, founded and led by former evangelical pastor Humberto Lay.

== History ==
In mid-2019, Humberto Lay resigned from the leadership of National Restoration, the party underwent a formal reorganization that involved a re-foundation with a name-change. After multiple talks with different political leaders, the party reached an agreement with former footballer George Forsyth in order to reorganize the party.

In October 2020, the party announced its re-foundation under Forsyth's leadership, thus effectively dissolving National Restoration, and establishing National Victory. Subsequently, the party nominated Forsyth for President for the 2021 general election, but was disqualified on 10 February 2021. However, the disqualification was revoked by the National Jury of Elections on 5 March 2021, following to an appeal. On Election Day, Forsyth placed 8th while in the Congressional election, the party failed to win any seats by a margin of 0.04%.

== Ideology ==
In contrast to the evangelical roots of National Restoration, National Victory holds on to a liberal conservative platform, with some support for progressive issues such as LGBT rights, as Forsyth has stated his support for a civil union proposal.

Economically, Forsyth is viewed as a pro-market candidate, although his stances on the Peruvian economy (according to Americas Quarterly) "are less clear".

== Election results ==
=== Presidential elections ===
Year	Candidate	Party	Votes	Percentage	Outcome
2021	George Forsyth	National Victory	793,588	5.63	8th

=== Elections to the Congress of the Republic ===
Year	Votes	%	Seats	▲/▼	Position
2021	638,264	4.96%	0 / 130	Steady	Extra-parliamentary
