= Gloria Montenegro (politician) =

Peruvian politician (1956–2025)

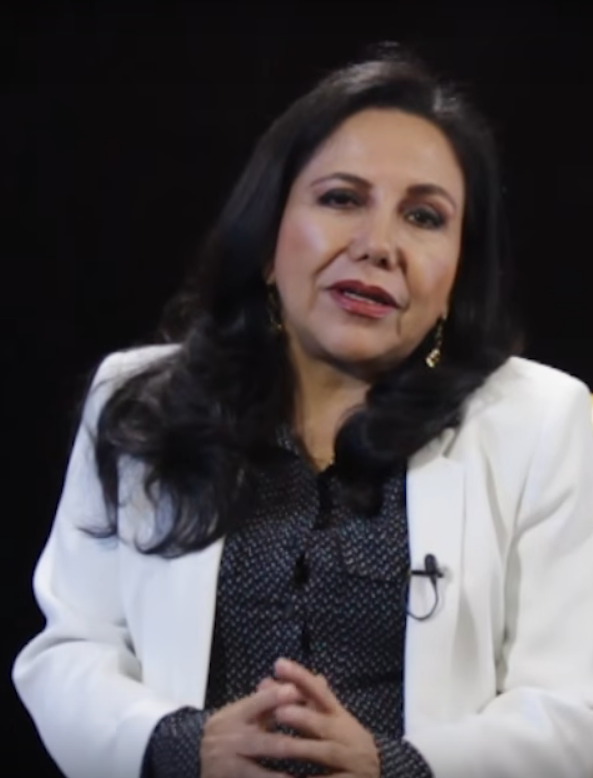
- Montenegro in 2015

Minister of Women and Vulnerable Populations
- In office 11 March 2019 – 6 August 2020
- President: Martín Vizcarra
- Prime Minister: Salvador del Solar; Vicente Zeballos; Pedro Cateriano
- Preceded by: Ana María Mendieta
- Succeeded by: Rosario Sasieta

Member of Congress
- In office 27 July 2016 – 30 September 2019
- Constituency: La Libertad

Mayor of Trujillo
- In office 23 April 2014 – 31 December 2014
- Preceded by: César Acuña
- Succeeded by: Elidio Espinoza

Personal details
- Born: 30 March 1956 La Unión, Huánuco, Peru
- Died: 21 May 2025 (aged 69)
- Party: Alliance for Progress (2014–2019); Purple Party (2020–2025)

Gloria Edelmira Montenegro Figueroa (30 March 1956 – 21 May 2025) was a Peruvian politician. She served as the Minister of Women and Vulnerable Populations in the presidency of Martín Vizcarra.

== Early life and education ==
Montenegro was born on 30 March 1956 in La Unión, Huánuco. She grew up in Chiclayo then moved to Lambayeque, where she studied accounting and administration at the Universidad Nacional Pedro Ruiz Gallo.

== Political career ==
In 2006, Montenegro was elected councilwoman (regidora) in Trujillo City Council; four years later she was elected deputy mayor of that city. In May 2014, she was appointed mayor of Trujillo (alcaldesa provincial) after her predecessor César Acuña resigned so that he could run for election to governor of the Department of La Libertad. She was mayor until the end of the year.

As a member of the Peruvian party Alliance for Progress, Montenegro was elected to congress in the 2016 elections in Peru. She was elected as a member for La Libertad for the legislative period from 28 July 2016 to 28 July 2021. On 11 March 2019, she was appointed Minister of Women and Vulnerable Populations, succeeding Ana María Mendieta.

After President Martín Vizcarra dissolved Congress on 30 September 2019, she and the other congressmembers lost their seats. Early new elections followed on 26 January 2020, in which the 130 seats in Congress were redistributed until the end of the legislative period. Montenegro was not re-elected. She remained Minister for Women and Vulnerable Populations until 6 August 2020. Three days earlier, Prime Minister Pedro Cateriano was ousted by a vote of no confidence. As a result, the new Prime Minister Walter Martos filled the cabinet. He appointed Rosario Sasieta to succeed Montenegro. In October 2020, she joined the Purple Party after having previously left the APP.

== Death ==
Montenegro died on 21 May 2025, at the age of 69, from complications during a neurosurgical procedure that resulted in brain death.
