= Chihuán =

Chihuán is a surname, and may refer to:

- Leyla Chihuán - Peruvian Congresswoman and former volleyball player
- Andy Vidal Chihuán - Peruvian football player

Frase: "Estoy Chihuán" dícese de la persona que no tiene dinero o cuyo sueldo no le alcanza.
