= Natale Amprimo =

Peruvian politician

Member of Congress
- In office 26 July 2001 – 26 July 2006
- Constituency: Lima

Personal details
- Born: Natale Juan Amprimo Pla; 24 June 1965 (age 61) Lima, Peru
- Party: Alliance for Progress (2005–2006)
- Other political affiliations: We Are Peru (1998-2004)
- Spouse: Patricia Robinson Urtecho
- Children: 3
- Parent(s): Orazio Amprimo; Estrella Pla
- Education: University of Lima

Natale Juan Amprimo Pla is a Peruvian politician. He was a Member of Congress for the period 2001–2006.

He left We Are Peru, former mayor of Lima Alberto Andrade's party, in 2004. He was Alianza para el Progreso's presidential candidate for the 2006 general election. He received 0.4% of the vote, coming in 10th place.

== Biography ==
He was born in Lima in 1965. Son of Orazio Amprimo and Estrella Pla.

He studied at the Colegio San Agustín in the city of Lima.

He entered the University of Lima where he studied Law and Political Science. In this house of studies he graduated as a Bachelor and obtained his law degree.

It has its own law firm; Among its outstanding clients are: the Archdiocese of Lima and Cementos Lima. In the same way, he was a lawyer and spokesman for the former mayor of Lima, Alberto Andrade.
