= Regional Government of La Libertad =

Regional government in Peru

- Gobierno Regional de La Libertad

Regional Government overview
- Formed: January 1, 2003; 23 years ago
- Jurisdiction: Department of La Libertad
- Website: Government site

The Regional Government of La Libertad (Spanish: Gobierno Regional de La Libertad; GORE La Libertad) is the regional government that represents the Department of La Libertad. It is the body with legal identity in public law and its own assets, which is in charge of the administration of provinces of the department in Peru. Its purpose is the social, cultural and economic development of its constituency. It is based in the city of Trujillo.

== List of representatives ==
Governor	Political party	Period
Homero Burgos Oliveros	APRA	January 1, 2003–December 31, 2006
José Murgia	APRA	January 1, 2007–December 31, 2010
José Murgia	APRA	January 1, 2011–December 31, 2014
César Acuña	Alianza para el Progreso	January 1, 2015–October 12, 2015
Luis Valdez Farías	Alianza para el Progreso	October 12, 2015–December 31, 2018
Manuel Llempén Coronel	Alianza para el Progreso	January 1, 2019–December 31, 2022
César Acuña	Alianza para el Progreso	January 1, 2023–October 14, 2025
Joana del Rosario Cabrera Pimentel	Alianza para el Progreso	October 14, 2025- Incumbent

== See also ==
- Regional Governments of Peru
- Department of La Libertad
