= César Acuña =

Peruvian politician, educator, and entrepreneur

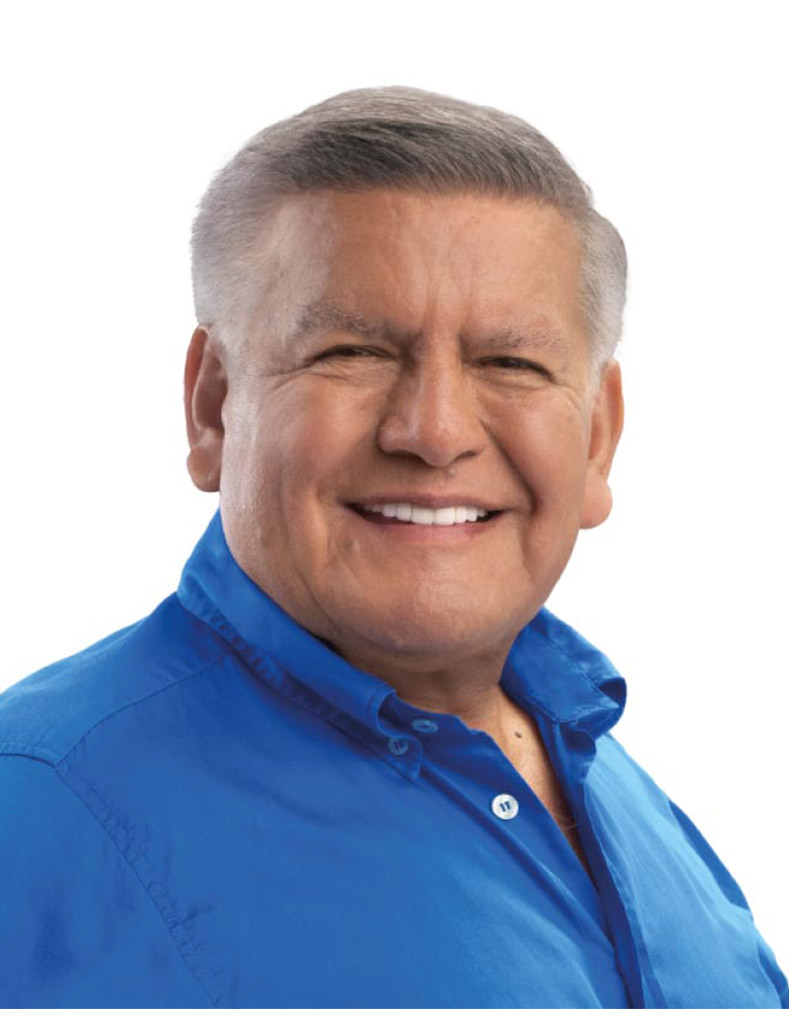
- Acuña in 2026

3rd & 6th Governor of La Libertad
- In office 1 January 2023 – 13 October 2025
- Lieutenant: Joana Cabrera Pimentel
- Preceded by: Manuel Llempén Coronel
- Succeeded by: Joana Cabrera Pimentel
- In office 1 January 2015 – 12 October 2015
- Preceded by: José Murgia
- Succeeded by: Luis Valdez Farías

President of the Regional Governments Assembly of Peru
- In office 28 January 2015 – 9 October 2015
- Preceded by: Alonso Navarro
- Succeeded by: Nelson Chui

Mayor of Trujillo
- In office 1 January 2007 – 23 April 2014
- Preceded by: José Murgia
- Succeeded by: Gloria Montenegro Figueroa

Member of Congress
- In office 26 July 2001 – 26 July 2006
- Constituency: La Libertad
- In office 26 July 2000 – 26 July 2001
- Constituency: National

President of Alliance for Progress
- Incumbent
- Assumed office 8 December 2001
- Preceded by: Office created

Founding President of César Vallejo University
- Incumbent
- Assumed office 12 November 1991

Personal details
- Born: 11 August 1952 (age 74) Tacabamba, Chota, Cajamarca, Peru
- Party: Alliance for Progress
- Other political affiliations: National Unity (2001); National Solidarity (2000)
- Height: 151 cm (4 ft 11 in)
- Spouse: Carmen Rosa Núñez (divorced)
- Children: 4, including Richard
- Relatives: Héctor Acuña (brother)
- Education: National University of Trujillo (BS); University of Los Andes (MA); University of Lima (MA); Complutense University of Madrid (Doctorado); Saint Thomas Aquinas University (Post-Doctorado.)
- Occupation: College entrepreneur Politician
- Profession: Chemical engineer

Cesar Acuña Peralta (born 11 August 1952) is a Peruvian politician and entrepreneur in the field of education who has served as the Governor of La Libertad since 2023. A controversial figure in Peruvian politics, he is the founder and leader of the Alliance for Progress party, which has achieved recognition for being the first party of provincial origin to gain electoral popularity at national level since its foundation in 2001. He was a presidential candidate in the 2026 Peruvian general election.

Acuña gained political recognition when in October 2006 was elected Mayor of Trujillo, ending a forty-four year uninterrupted tenure of the Peruvian Aprista Party in the northern city. He was successfully reelected in 2010. Four years later, he was elected Governor of La Libertad, this time defeating the same party at regional level. Ten months after being sworn in, he resigned as governor and started a full-scale presidential campaign for the 2016 general election. Considered a potential run-off nominee against frontrunner Keiko Fujimori, he was eventually disqualified by the electoral authorities after alleged vote-buying in a campaign trail. Throughout the campaign, he faced accusations regarding plagiarism in two of his graduate thesis', and of illegally self-appropriating a published work on education policy under his name, which authorship belonged to an associated educator.

Since his failed 2016 presidential bid, Acuña was considered a potential candidate for the 2021 general election. Although he initially did not express interest on matter, he formally announced his run in the election in late October 2020. He ultimately placed seventh with 6% of the popular vote, managing to win La Libertad Region only, although his party achieved congressional representation throughout the country.

In 2022, he was reelected to the governorship of La Libertad.

== Early life and education ==
César Acuña Peralta was born on August 11, 1952, in the Peruvian hamlet of Ayaque, Tacabamba District, Chota Province, Cajamarca Region. He is the third of twelve brothers. His parents were Héctor Acuña Cabrera and Clementina Peralta Alvarado, people dedicated to agricultural work. His parents had no formal education (only the father attended primary school). Acuña and his 11 siblings completed their primary and secondary studies at the Tacabamba National School for Boys and Girls.

When he was 18 years old, he traveled to Trujillo and enrolled in the School of Engineering at the National University of Trujillo in 1972, graduating at the age of 23 with a bachelor's degree in chemical engineering. To cover his college expenses, he had to sell cañazo (strong liquor) that he obtained from the then Casa Grande sugar plantation. As a student, he founded the Prep-College Engineering Academy in 1980, thus beginning his career as an entrepreneur in education. This academy was located on Carrión Avenue.

On November 12, 1991, Law 25350 was enacted, which created César Vallejo University. The college would expand throughout the country with campuses in Chiclayo, Piura, Chimbote, Tarapoto, Lima, Huaraz and Moyobamba. In 1996 he founded the Club Deportivo Universidad César Vallejo, which represents Cesar Vallejo University in Peruvian professional football, and the regional television network UCV Satelital. In 2001 he established the Señor de Sipán University in Chiclayo, and three years later the Harvard College of Piura. Finally, in 2007, he founded the Autonomous University of Peru in the populous district of Villa El Salvador in Lima. Acuña would earn much of his wealth from his for-profit universities.

During the 1990s, Acuña attained a master's degree in College Management at the University of Los Andes (Colombia), a master's degree in Education Administration at the University of Lima, a Ph.D. in Education at the Complutense University of Madrid (Spain), and Post-Ph.D. in Communication, Education and Culture at the Saint Thomas Aquinas University (Colombia).

== Political career ==
=== Fujimori government ===
Acuña first ran for a seat in the lower house of the Peruvian Congress at the 1990 general election with the United Left from La Libertad constituency. Although not elected, he started working towards founding his own political party called Alianza para el Progreso.

At the 2000 general election, he was elected to Congress as an independent within the National Solidarity Party. Upon taking office, he quit the National Solidarity parliamentary caucus and former an independent bloc. According to the Institute of Legal Defense (IDL), the journalist Christopher Acosta reported that Acuña allegedly worked with Vladimiro Montesinos of the National Intelligence Service (SIN) in an effort to be paid for supporting the Fujimori government, with the IDL writing that former secretary of Montesinos, Matilde Pinchi Pinchi, saw the two together. According to Pinchi Pinchi, IDL and RPP reported, Acuña also requested a position as a minister in exchange for supporting Fujimori, declining the payment of $10,000 USD. Acuña would deny the allegations.

During his tenure, he was a member of the Sub-Commission on the Corruption Video, Kouri-Montesinos case, a member of the Investigative Sub-Commission on the Comptroller General of the Republic, Carmen Higaonna, and a member of the Investigative Sub-Commission on the Indignation Video, case Gamarra. His term would be shortened to one-year following Alberto Fujimori's downfall and the convoking of new general elections for April 2001.

=== Founding of party ===
At the 2001 general election, Acuña was invited by Lourdes Flores to run for reelection with the National Unity coalition. At the time, he was in the final stages of starting his own political party. He was ultimately elected representing La Libertad constituency.

On December 8, 2001, in Trujillo, Acuña founded the Alliance for Progress, his own political party. Following this event, he quit the National Unity parliamentary caucus and formed an independent bloc once again. Throughout his full term in Congress, he led numerous bills regarding education business regulations, and was a member of the investigative committee's on corruption in the Fujimori regime.

At the 2006 general election, Acuña invited fellow congressman Natale Amprimo to run for President of Peru with the Alliance for Progress nomination, and himself as his first running mate (which allowed him to run simultaneously for reelection to Congress). Although he attained the highest vote count in his constituency, the nationwide results were 2.3% of the popular vote, failing to pass the new electoral threshold. The presidential ticket itself attained 0.4% of the popular vote, placing tenth.

=== Mayorship of Trujillo and Regional Governor of La Libertad (2007–2015) ===
Following the 2006 general election's poor results, Alliance for Progress lost its party registration in the National Jury of Elections alongside the rest of the parties that failed to pass the threshold. That same year, Acuña made his first mayoral bid in Trujillo. Considered as an underdog throughout the entire campaign, his victory proved a major blow for the Peruvian Aprista Party, as the city is widely recognized as the Aprista party's birthplace and stronghold in the Peruvian north. He attained 56.5% of the popular vote. President of Peru and leader of the Peruvian Aprista Party, Alan García, lamented his party's defeat in Trujillo, being quoted by the press saying: "I cried on Sunday night because I never thought that Haya de la Torre's cradle and grave could be lost. It is a stab in the heart, I say it as a son. At some point I will recover Trujillo even if I have to be a candidate for mayor personally. Many good people from Trujillo have punished the disorders and the pride of some people there...".

Acuña ran for mayoral reelection in 2010, defeating once again the Peruvian Aprista Party nominee, Daniel Salaverry, with 43.9% of the popular vote. After 7 years in office, he formally resigned to the mayorship in order to run for Governor of La Libertad in the 2014 regional elections. The region had been governed by José Murgia since 2007, and remained the last Aprista governorship at national level. Acuña ultimately won the election with 43.6% of the popular vote, defeating Murgia.

During the 2011 general election campaign, he was sanctioned five times for violating electoral neutrality in his position as Mayor of Trujillo, acting in favor of his son as well as presidential candidate Pedro Pablo Kuczynski. In September 2011, the Prosecutor's Office ordered an experts opinion to the accounts of the universities of César Acuña for alleged money laundering, in response to the complaint made by his own wife, Carmen Rosa Núnez Campos.

In June 2012, the National Office of Electoral Processes (ONPE) fined Alliance for Progress with more than 9 million soles for having received contributions ten times greater than the allowed limit from César Vallejo University.

In May 2013, a video was released in which Acuña proposed to members of his party to "buy votes" to achieve his reelection as mayor of Trujillo, allegedly using public funds. Acuña admitted that he "bought votes" to achieve his reelection and that it does not seem like a bad thing to him, but denied that it was with public funds. That same month, another audio revealed that Acuña used resources from the Municipality's Treasury to improve his image as mayor of Trujillo.

Upon taking office in January 2015, Acuña led diverse infrastructure programs throughout the region of La Libertad, and constantly clashed with the new mayor of Trujillo, a former police colonel Elidio Espinoza, an independent who defeated Alliance for Progress the year prior.

=== 2016 Presidential nomination ===
Acuña started to gain traction at national level polls in mid-2015. Considered a potential candidate for the presidency at the 2016 general election, he initiated an exploratory committee in September 2015. After 10 months in office, he resigned as governor, and started a full-scale presidential bid with his Alliance for Progress.

Following his announcement, he started to gain momentum in the polls. In November 2015, he placed third for the first time, behind frontrunner Keiko Fujimori and Pedro Pablo Kuczynski, and above Alan García. His popular support was largely viewed by the media as a rejection towards the traditional political class. Upon registering his ticket, Acuña announced as running mates former Minister of Women and Social Development, Anel Townsend, and congressman Humberto Lay. Following this event, he announced the composition of the Alliance for the Progress of Peru coalition, which included his party, National Restoration, and We Are Peru.

His campaign was marked by controversy. During the month of January, he was accused of plagiarism in both his master's and Ph.D. thesis, at the University of Lima and the Complutense University of Madrid, respectively. Although he denied the allegations, the universities opened investigations against him. Amidst the scandal, he was also accused of plagiarizing an entire work titled Educative Policy, written by a professor of his, Otoniel Alvarado. Acuña claimed that both authors had agreed on releasing the work together on separate authorships, but Alvarado denied any agreement of sort, and proceeded to publicly denounce him for plagiarism. Acuña later commented on the issue by declaring to the press that he had not committed plagiarism, and that "it was just copying". Upon the numerous accusations against his persona, Francisco Miró Quesada Rada resigned as president of César Vallejo University. Acuña replaced him by naming former Prime Minister of Peru, Beatriz Merino, as the new president of his university.

==== Disqualification and later events ====
Following the previous events, Acuña was accused of attempted vote-buying during a campaign trail, as he offered money to a disabled young man for his future medical operation. Describing his gesture as "humanitarian aid", the Electoral National Jury proceeded to open an investigation. He was subsequently barred from the election, alongside another front-runner candidate, Julio Guzmán, for irregularities in the nomination procedure. Although his campaign team presented extensive appeals to the barring, it was ultimately not overruled His last poll appearance placed him fourth. Analysts viewed his barring from the election with Guzmán as a leverage for other candidates, mainly Pedro Pablo Kuczynski, who managed to earn second place and qualify for the run-off against front-runner Keiko Fujimori. Kuczynski, a former ally of Acuña, was subsequently elected president in the run-off.

Although his presidential nomination was barred from the 2016 election, Alliance for Progress obtained 9.2% of the popular vote at parliamentary level, gaining 9 out of 130 seats in the Peruvian Congress. Following the constitutional dissolution of Congress on September 30, 2019, by president Martín Vizcarra, his party obtained 8.0% of the popular vote and 22 out of 130 seats at the 2020 snap parliamentary election.

In November 2018, Acuña testified before the prosecution on the case of money laundering, the investigations are still open, the president of the Alliance for Progress party, indicated that the transfers are legal before judicial authorities.

=== 2021 presidential campaign ===
Acuña has remained skeptical of running for the presidency in the 2021 general election, but keeps polling as potential nominee due to the strong popularity his party has achieved since the 2020 snap-election. He was disqualified on 8 January 2021, due to incomplete information regarding the presidential nominee's income in registration form. However, following an appeal, he was reinstated on 22 January 2021. He ultimately placed seventh with 6% of the popular vote in a heavily atomized election, managing to win La Libertad Region only, although his party achieved congressional representation throughout the country.

That year, César Acuña was investigated for money laundering. The acquisition of a property in the Soto de La Moraleja urbanisation in Madrid (Spain), valued at 1,200,000 euros, is the reason for which he is being investigated. In January 2022, a judge found Christopher Acosta, his book's publisher and the director of the publisher guilty of defamation for their book "Plata Como Cancha," investigating allegations of Acuña participating in vote buying, embezzlement and plagiarism, with the judge arguing that certain allegations lacked sufficient sources and fined the entities $100,000, with the funds being awarded to Acuña.

=== Return as governor ===
In 2022, César Acuña was elected regional governor of La Libertad by the Alliance for Progress party. During his electoral campaign, Acuña used memes to promote his works and proposals, which generated controversy among some sectors of the population. While in office, he assured that he had been personally contacted by God, saying that God supported him and that "I have a Lord, who will do justice to the people who hurt me."

Acuña used advertisements to improve his image while in office, having some of the highest expenses amongst regional governments.

=== 2026 presidential campaign ===
Acuña is a presidential candidate for the 2026 Peruvian general election. In a 2026 CELAG survey, Acuña was the second most disapproved candidate amongst respondents listed, only behind Vladimir Cerrón, with 79.5% of those polled having a negative view of him.

== Political positions ==
According to the Council on Hemispheric Affairs, Acuña supports right-wing politics and promoted international investment in Peru. Following Pedro Castillo's success in the first round of 2021 elections, Acuña began a campaign tour promoting Fujimorism and Keiko Fujimori titled "Crusade for Peru" creating an alliance with her and stating to supporters at a rally "I forget acts of corruption of Fujimorism" while also condemning left-wing politics. Acuña also supported the release of Alberto Fujimori from prison, citing Fujimori's age and health.

== See also ==
- Alliance for Progress
