= Ana María Mendieta =

Peruvian lawyer and politician

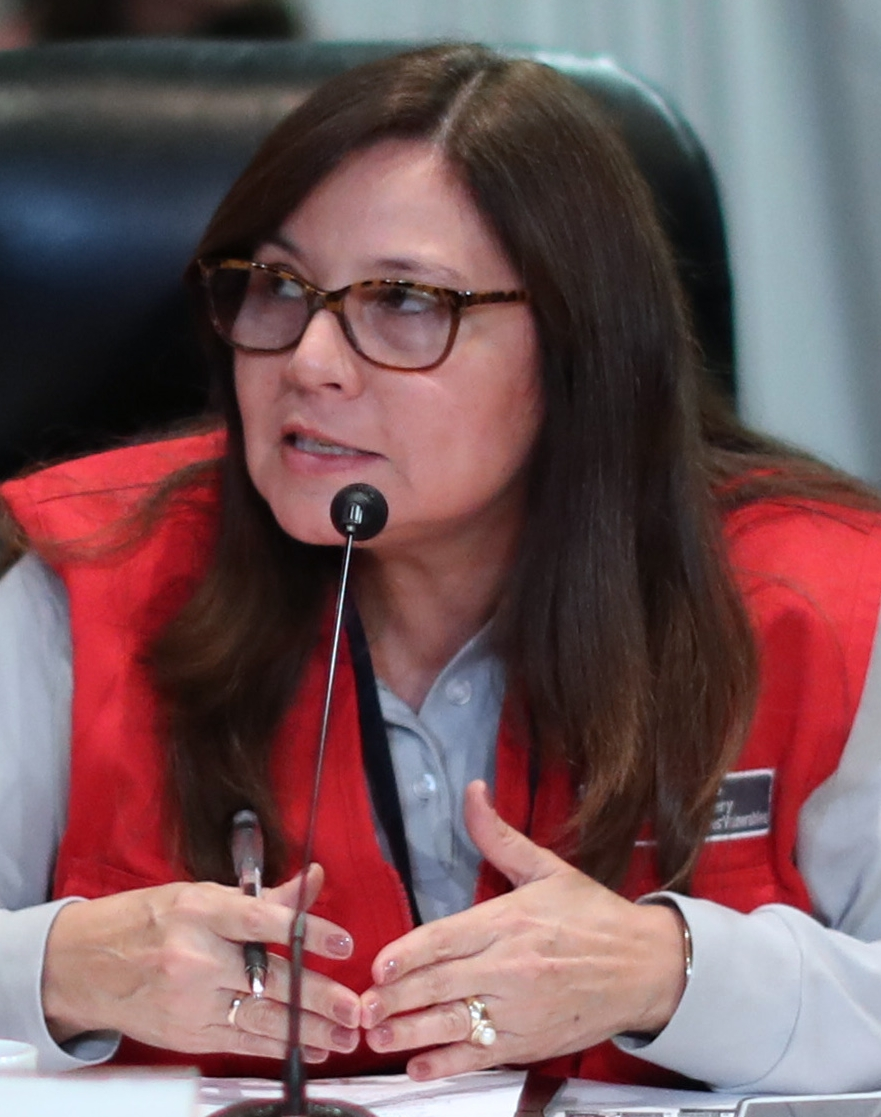
Ana María Mendieta

Ana María Alejandra Mendieta Trefogli is a Peruvian lawyer and politician. She was the Minister of Women and Vulnerable Populations in the government of Martín Vizcarra from April 2018 until March 2019; she succeeded Ana María Choquehuanca in the position, and was herself succeeded by Gloria Montenegro. She is a graduate of the Pontifical Catholic University of Peru and of Federico Villarreal National University.
