= Karina Beteta =

Peruvian politician (born 1975)

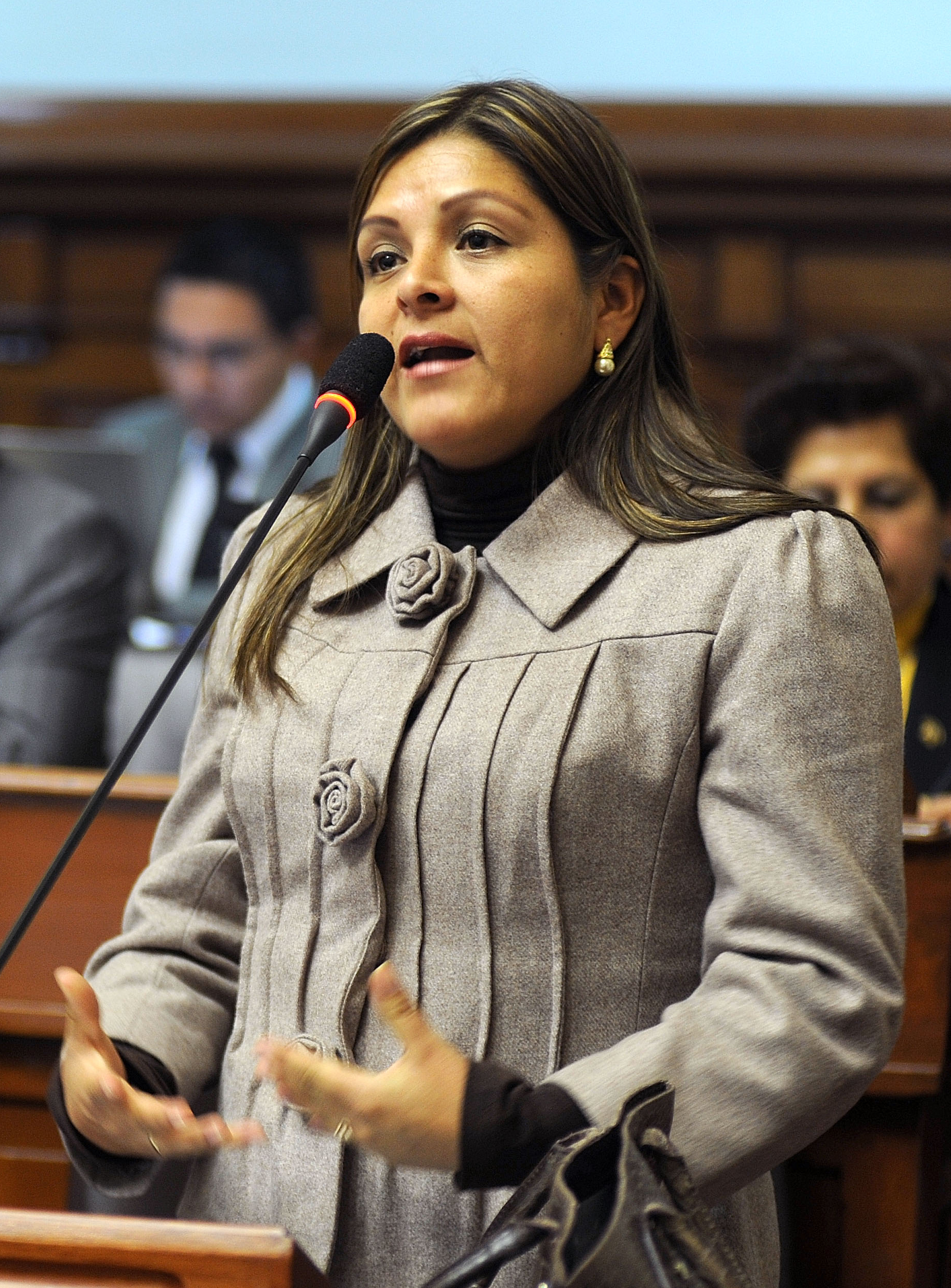
- Beteta in 2010

First Vice President of Congress First Vice President of the Permanent Assembly from 30 September 2019 to 16 March 2020
- In office 27 July 2019 – 16 March 2020
- President: Pedro Olaechea
- Preceded by: Leyla Chihuán
- Succeeded by: Luis Valdez Farías

Member of Congress
- In office 26 July 2015 – 16 March 2020
- Preceded by: Alejandro Yovera
- Constituency: Huánuco
- In office 26 July 2006 – 26 July 2011
- Constituency: Huánuco

Personal details
- Born: 18 January 1975 (age 51) Huánuco, Huánuco, Huánuco, Peru
- Party: Popular Force (2014-present); Union for Peru (2010)
- Education: Universidad de Huánuco (LLB); National University of San Marcos (MA)
- Occupation: Politician
- Profession: Lawyer

Karina Juliza Beteta Rubín (born 18 January 1975) is a Peruvian politician. She has served as a congresswoman representing Huánuco for the period 2006-2011 and in 2016 election was elected again, this time representing the Popular Force party for the period 2016 - 2021.
