= George Forsyth (footballer) =

Peruvian politician and former international footballer (born 1982)

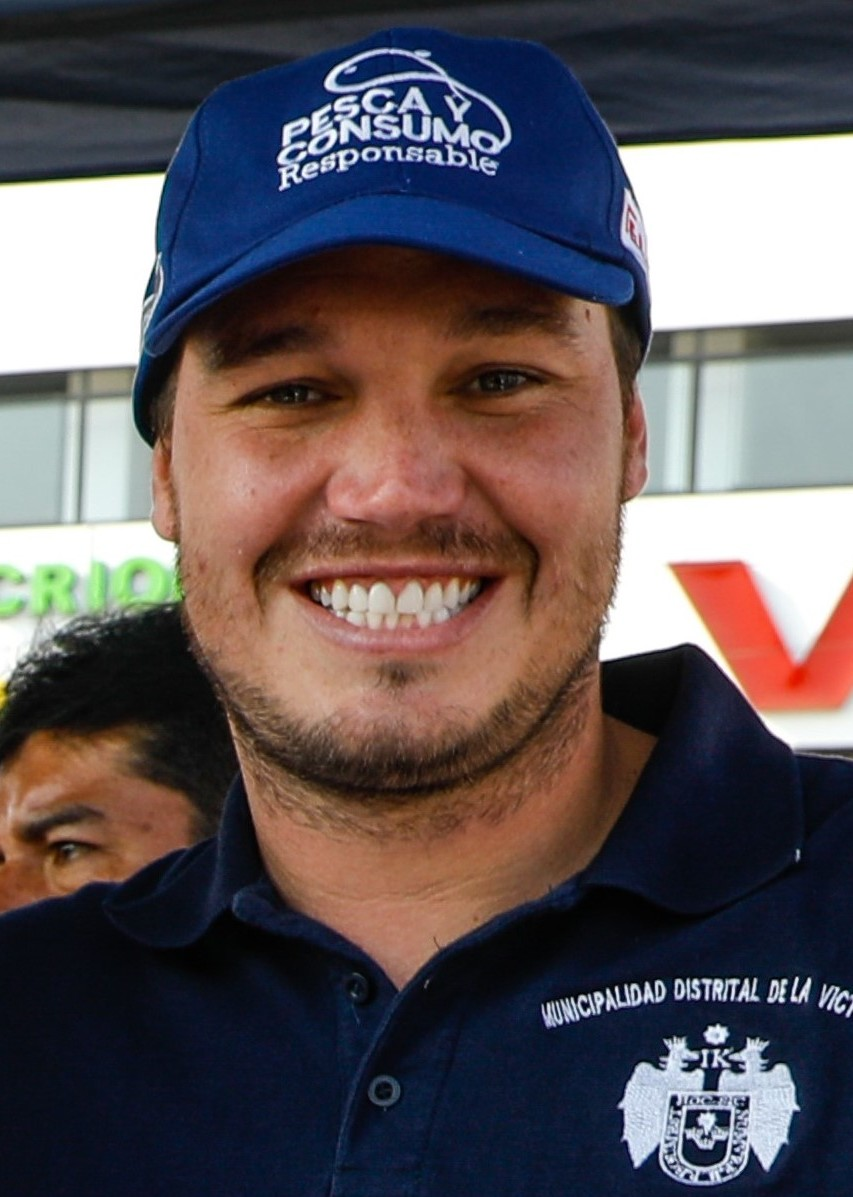

Mayor of La Victoria
- In office 1 January 2019 – 12 October 2020
- Preceded by: Harry Castro Durand
- Succeeded by: Luis Gutiérrez Salvatierra

La Victoria District Councilman
- In office 1 January 2011 – 31 December 2014

Personal details
- Born: George Patrick Forsyth Sommer; 20 June 1982 (age 44) Caracas, Venezuela
- Party: We Are Peru (2021–present)
- Other political affiliations: National Victory/National Restoration (2020–2021); Independent (before 2020)
- Spouse: Vanessa Terkes (m. 2018; div. 2019)
- Education: Peruvian University of Applied Sciences
Association football career
- Position: Goalkeeper
Senior career*
Years	Team	Apps	(Gls)
2001–2002	Alianza Lima	0	(0)
2002–2003	Borussia Dortmund II	6	(0)
2003	Atlético Universidad	12	(0)
2004	Alianza Lima	9	(0)
2005	Sport Boys	4	(0)
2005–2007	Alianza Lima	42	(0)
2007–2008	Atalanta	0	(0)
2008–2016	Alianza Lima	173	(0)
Total		246	(0)
International career
2007–2014	Peru	7	(0)
- * Club domestic league appearances and goals

George Patrick Forsyth Sommer (born 20 June 1982) is a Peruvian politician and former international footballer.

Forsyth played as a goalkeeper for Alianza Lima, Borussia Dortmund II, Atlético Universidad, Sport Boys and Atalanta, and he also earned 7 caps for the Peru national team.

Starting a career in politics at local level, Forsyth was elected lieutenant mayor and district councilman of La Victoria in 2010, and thus gained prominence as the first footballer to be elected to public office in Peru while still playing at professional level. In 2014, he briefly served as the district's acting mayor when the incumbent ran for mayor of Lima.

In 2018, Forsyth was elected as mayor of La Victoria for We Are Peru. He resigned in October 2020 in order to run for President of Peru in the 2021 general elections with National Victory, the succeeding party of National Restoration. At the election, he placed eighth after attaining only 5.6% of the vote.

== Early life and education ==
Forsyth was born in Caracas, Venezuela. His father, Harold Forsyth, is a Peruvian diplomat, ambassador to the United States and China, and former congressman. His mother, María Verónica Sommer Mayer, is a former Miss Chile beauty pageant winner and her family is of German descent. He was born in Caracas while his father served in the Peruvian embassy in Venezuela. Forsyth lived a privileged childhood and was not exposed to the lifestyles of common Peruvians until he began his football career according to Americas Quarterly.

Upon graduating high school in 2004, Forsyth began to study Industrial Engineering at the University of San Martín de Porres, which he did not complete, switching to the Peruvian University of Applied Sciences to study business administration, although he eventually dropped-out to focus on his football career. Subsequently, he founded several companies including in the field of security (300); in the fashion and clothing field, (G&F); in the field of high physical performance, (VO2); and in gastronomy (a seafood restaurant) among others.

== Football career ==
=== Club career ===
During his adolescence, Forsyth played for FC Lannesdorf 07 in Germany. Then in 2001, he joined Alianza Lima, where he would begin his professional career. In that year, he was part of the squad that obtained the national title in the institution's centenary added to the classification for the 2002 Copa Libertadores. In 2002, he was the third goalkeeper for Borussia Dortmund. He was part of the Alianza Lima team that won the national titles of 2003 and 2004.

After a brief stint at Sport Boys of Callao in 2005, he returned to Alianza Lima to obtain the 2006 Decentralized Championship. This would be Forsyth's fourth national title, but the first where he was the undisputed holder, being considered the best goalkeeper of the season.

On 20 February 2007, Forsyth made his debut in a Copa Libertadores against Club Necaxa. with a 2–1 defeat of his team, playing 43 minutes. At the 2007 Copa Libertadores, he played 3 games, receiving 6 goals, playing 223 minutes, remaining last without being able to qualify. In August 2007 he joined Atalanta, debuting on 29 August 2007 in the Italian Cup against Ascoli, with a 1–2 result in favor of Ascoli, and playing 127 minutes.

He played with Alianza Lima at the 2010 Copa Libertadores.

After the elimination in the Copa Libertadores, Forsyth was injured, and was replaced by Salomón Libman as the main goalkeeper. Forsyth was called up for the last game of the 2010 Torneo Descentralizado against University of San Martín de Porres, ending 1–1. After a season plagued of injuries, adding the harsh elimination against Universidad de Chile, Forsyth hoped to fully recover in 2011 in order to return as a starter. However, Alianza Lima was eliminated in the playoffs towards the group stage of the 2011 Copa Libertadores against Jaguares, with the score of 2–0 in Lima, and also in Chiapas. Finally, seeing that his chances of returning as the starter goalkeeper were slim, on Forsyth announced his departure from Alianza Lima on 3 March, but that he would return to the club to be the president.

On 31 July 2011, with the departure of Gustavo Costas to Saudi Arabia and the arrival of Miguel Ángel Arrué as Alianza Lima's new coach, Forsyth was called up as starter for a match against Unión Comercio, that ended 0–0.

=== International career ===
Forsyth earned seven caps for Peru between 2007 and 2014.

== Political career ==
George Forsyth's political career began in 2010 when he ran for District Councilman of La Victoria, as part of the Alberto Sánchez-Aizcorbe's National Unity list, which won with 34% of the valid votes. As the first councilman, he served simultaneously as Lieutenant Mayor to Sánchez-Aizcorbe.

In 2014, he became acting mayor, under the license of the then mayor Alberto Sánchez for his run for mayor of Lima at the municipal elections. In this position, he became the first active soccer player to assume a high municipal position in Peruvian history.

=== Mayor of La Victoria ===
At the 2018 municipal elections, Forsyth retired from football and was nominated for mayor of the La Victoria by the We Are Peru party. He was subsequently elected as mayor with 34.6% of the vote.

Forsyth's tenure has been described as "tough-on-crime", with the ex-footballer assuming office in January 2019. At the beginning, he moved the mayor's office to the San Cosme Sports Complex, a vulnerable area due to the greater concentration of urban and informal commercial growth in the district in front of the Gamarra commercial emporium. On the other hand, he sealed an agreement with the president of the Judiciary for the installation of a Flagrancy Court in the district. Likewise, he reached a formal agreement with the National Prosecutor's Office for the installation of a Corporate Provincial Prosecutor's Office of the Public Ministry.

With Peru having about seventy-three percent of workers working informally in 2019, Forsyth fought against informal vendors in La Victoria. He ordered the three day closure of the Gamarra in order to remove informal and illegal commerce that competed with the complex. In late-2019, Forsyth spent three months training to be a reservist for the Peruvian Army and graduated in December 2019. Those observing Forsyth's time as mayor have not been able to make conclusions about his leadership. He resigned as mayor in October 2020 and announced his intention to run for President of Peru in the elections.

=== 2021 Peruvian presidential campaign ===
In April 2020 poll had him as the only major political figure with a net positive image. In September 2020, Forsyth became a full-member of the National Restoration party after months of speculation of a potential presidential run at the 2021 general election.

Following the removal of Martín Vizcarra and the beginning of the 2020 Peruvian protests, Forsyth said that he disagreed with demonstrations, stating "This is not the time to take to the streets, we are going to have our revenge next year in the elections". He later backtracked on his statement, saying Peruvians "have their legitimate right to go out and protest and people have to demonstrate and raise their voices, very carefully and without violence".

A video on an account portraying to be linked to hacktivist group Anonymous was spread denouncing corruption in Peru and described Forsyth as the only "clean" presidential candidate, though Peruvian media and official Anonymous accounts later reported that the group denied support for any political candidates. Anonymous would later allege that Forsyth created the fake video himself as promotion for his presidential campaign, threatening him with possible hacking activity. Forsyth later denied involvement with the video

It was reported in January 2021 that Forsyth was invited to Brazil by governor of São Paulo, João Doria. While in Brazil, Forsyth had also met with former Brazilian president Michel Temer, with the latter providing Forsyth with campaign advice.

During his campaign, he was accused of having offered a position to one of his friends in La Victoria District with an excessive remunerations; the Public Ministry opened an investigation of the situation.

==== Disqualification ====
A report from the investigative journalism website OjoPúblico – which was released between the 31 January and 3 February 2021, a week before presidential candidates were finalized – alleged that three vehicles owned by Forsyth were gifted to him from companies he was involved with and that various companies he held shares in were not included in his electoral application for the National Jury of Elections (JNE). OjoPúblico wrote that Forsyth did not mention that he was gifted vehicles worth US$67,000 in his electoral documentation; a Toyota Land Cruiser Prado from Inca Rail shareholder and Crosland Kawasaki dealer Juan Forsyth Alarco, a Honda Pilot and Kawasaki Ninja ZX-10R from George Forsyth's GRT Seguridad y Control security company. The investigation also reported that Forsyth was the founder and a shareholder of Fyvcon, a real estate company, and nine other companies. Of the companies, OjoPúblico reported that Forsyth did not declare income from Fyvcon in 2019 and that he did not include four of the ten companies in his JNE application. Included in the report were statements by Special Electoral Juries (JEE) auditor Ivan Salazar Salazar, who said "the candidate did not declare income that he would receive in the private sector" and "we would be facing a possible omission of information", with OjoPúblico concluding that "the JEE of Lima Centro 1 will have to make a decision on the request for exclusion of the candidate".

On 10 February 2021 when presidential candidates were finalized, the Special Electoral Juries JEE ruled that Forsyth be disqualified from the presidential election citing information that was allegedly falsified and excluded from his election application. According to the filed report, the information in question involved Forsyth holding shares to various companies that were not included in his application. Following the JEE's decision, the National Victory party still had the opportunity to appeal.

On 22 February 2021, the National Elections Jury (JNE) annulled the JEE resolution, and he was reinstated to the race by the National Jury of Elections on 5 March 2021, following an appeal.

=== 2026 Peruvian presidential election ===
On 23 June 2026, the We Are Peru party distanced itself from Forsyth due to his support of Roberto Sánchez, saying that Forsyth "does not represent the feelings of the party."

== Ideology and views ==
Forsyth is a member of the liberal conservative National Victory party, which emerged from the right-wing Evangelical National Restoration. He described himself as a centrist and focused on combatting crime during his tenure as mayor. Political scientist Dr. Paula Muñoz of the Universidad del Pacífico described Forsyth as "a pro-business guy", while Americas Quarterly wrote "his views on big economic issues are less clear".

== Personal life ==
During his mayoral candidacy in 2018, Forsyth married Peruvian actress Vanessa Terkes on 25 August 2018. Weeks after taking office in January 2019, Forsyth announced that Terkes was leaving to Mexico due to alleged death threats against the couple, leading rumors of a separation. The two were married for eight months until they divorced in May 2019. Days after their divorce, Terkes presented charges of domestic violence against Forsyth to the Public Ministry of Peru on 31 May 2019, with her lawyer stating that she experienced psychological abuse from Forsyth during their marriage. Forsyth denied the allegations, saying that his municipal government was "building a place for women, girls who have been violated" and stating "I respect all women very much". On 4 April 2021, a week before the general elections, Forsyth announced that he had tested positive for COVID-19 in a molecular test carried out after a trip to the regions of Madre de Dios, Junín and Cajamarca.
