= Ana María Choquehuanca =

Peruvian politician

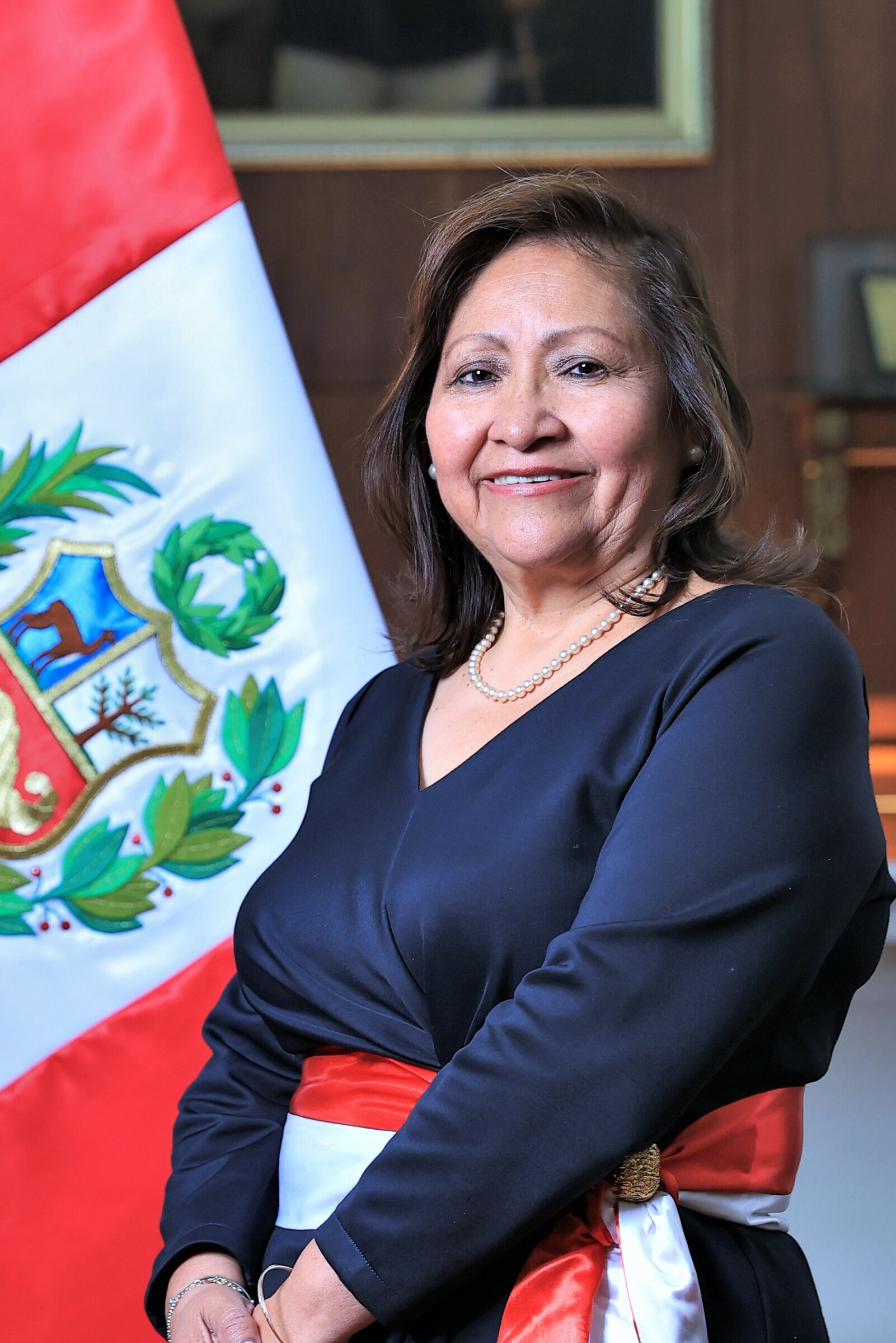
- Official portrait, 2023

Minister of Production
- In office 6 September 2023 – 1 April 2024
- President: Dina Boluarte
- Prime Minister: Alberto Otárola; Gustavo Adrianzén
- Preceded by: Raúl Pérez-Reyes
- Succeeded by: Sergio González Guerrero

Minister of Women and Vulnerable Populations
- In office 27 July 2017 – 2 April 2018
- President: Pedro Pablo Kuczynski; Martín Vizcarra
- Prime Minister: Fernando Zavala; Mercedes Aráoz
- Preceded by: Ana María Romero-Lozada
- Succeeded by: Ana María Mendieta

Member of Congress
- In office 27 July 2016 – 30 September 2019
- Constituency: Arequipa

Personal details
- Born: Ana María Choquehuanca de Villanueva; 2 November 1958 (age 67) Arequipa, Peru
- Party: PPK (2016–2019)
- Education: Catholic University of Santa María; University of Zaragoza

Ana María Choquehuanca de Villanueva (born 2 November 1958, in Arequipa) is a Peruvian politician, businesswoman, and economist. In 2016, she was elected to Congress to represent Arequipa. She was the Minister of Women and Vulnerable Populations from 27 July 2017 to 2 April 2018.

== Biography ==
Choquehuanca began her studies at the colleges of Nuestra Señora de la Asunción and Nuestra Señora de la Merced in the city of her birth, Arequipa. Later, she began studying economics at the Catholic University of Santa María and completed a master's degree in Administration at Spenta University in Mexico. Choquehuanca possesses a postgraduate degree from the Catholic University of Santa María and the University of Zaragoza.

In the private sector, Choquehuanca has been a manager for Uranio Contratistas EIRL, METALSUR, and ISVISA. She is president of the Association of Small Businesses of Pyme-Peru and of the Pyme Chamber of Arequipa.

In 2016, Choquehuanca was elected to the Congress of the Republic of Peru representing Peruvians for Change for the city of Arequipa for the 2016–2021 term.

On 27 July 2017, she was made Minister of Women and Vulnerable Populations until 2 April 2018 when she was replaced with Ana María Mendieta by Martín Vizcarra.
