= National Restoration (Peru) =

National Restoration Restauración Nacional
- Abbreviation: RN
- Secretary-General: John Eliot Fernández de Paredes Silva
- Founder: Humberto Lay
- Founded: 25 November 2005
- Dissolved: December 2020
- Succeeded by: National Victory
- Ideology: Christian democracy Social conservatism
- Political position: Centre-right to right-wing
- Religion: Evangelicalism

Website
- http://www.restauracionnacional.pe

National Restoration (Spanish: Restauración Nacional, RN) was a Peruvian Christian evangelicalist political party.

== History ==
In 2016, National Restoration once again allied with Alliance for Progress and the two formed the Alliance for the Progress of Peru and presented Cesar Acuña as their presidential candidate with Humberto Lay as its candidate for First Vice President, however on 9 March the National Elections Jury barred Acuña from participating in the general election for violating the Political Parties Law.

== Dissolution ==
In mid-2019, Lay resigned from the leadership of National Restoration, the party underwent a formal reorganization that involved a re-foundation with a name-change. After multiple talks with different political leaders, the party reached an agreement with former footballer George Forsyth in order to reorganize the party.

In October 2020, the party announced its re-foundation under Forsyth's leadership, thus effectively dissolving National Restoration, and establishing National Victory.

== Election results ==
=== Presidential election ===
| | Candidate | Party / Coalition | Votes | Percentage | Outcome |
|---|---|---|---|---|---|
| 2006 | Humberto Lay | National Restoration | 537 564 | 4.38 | 6th |
| 2011 | Pedro Pablo Kuczynski | Alliance for the Great Change APP-PPC-RN-PHP | 2 711 450 | 18.51 | 3rd |
| 2016 | César Acuña | Alliance for the Progress of Peru APP-RN-PDSP | Disqualified | N/A | N/A |

=== Elections to the Congress of the Republic ===
| Year | Votes | % | Seats | ▲/▼ | Position |
|---|---|---|---|---|---|
| 2006 | 432 191 | 4.0% | 2 / 120 | ▲2 | Minority |
| 2011 | 1 851 080 | 14.4% as part of Alliance for the Great Change. Only 1 from National Restoration. | 12 / 130 | ▼1 | Minority |
| 2016 | 1 125 682 | 9.2% as part of Alliance for the Progress of Peru. None from National Restoration | 9 / 130 | ▼1 | N/A |

=== Regional and municipal elections ===
| Year | Gobiernos Regionales | Alcaldías Provinciales | Alcaldías Distritales |
| Year | Outcome | Outcome | Outcome |
|---|---|---|---|
| 2006 | 0 / 25 | 6 / 195 | 40 / 1,637 |
| 2010 | 0 / 25 | 6 / 195 | 35 / 1,639 |
| 2014 | 0 / 25 | 2 / 195 | 11 / 1,647 |
| 2018 | 1 / 25 | 8 / 196 | 47 / 1,678 |
