= Leyla Chihuán =

Peruvian politician and former volleyball player

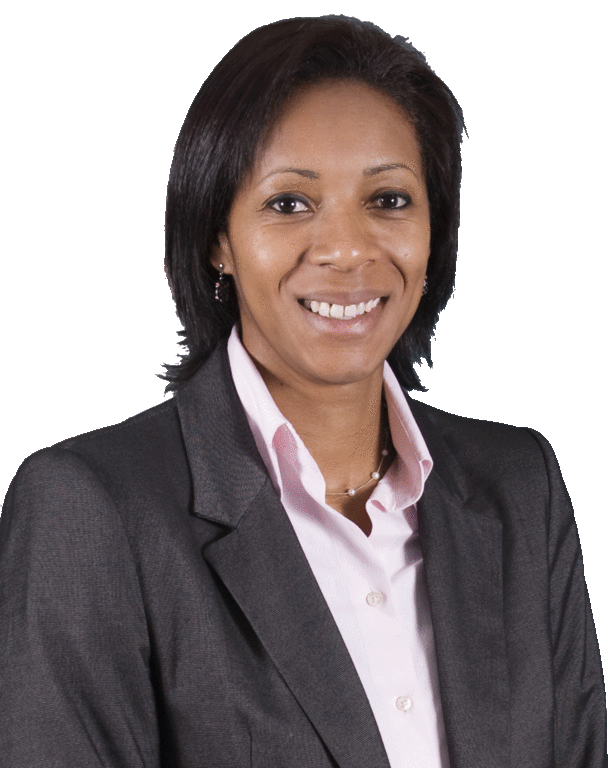

First Vice President of Congress
- In office July 26, 2018 – July 27, 2019
- President: Daniel Salaverry
- Preceded by: Mario Mantilla
- Succeeded by: Karina Beteta

Member of Congress
- In office July 26, 2011 – September 30, 2019
- Constituency: Lima

Personal details
- Born: September 4, 1975 (age 50) Lima, Peru
- Party: Popular Force
- Height: 1.83 m (6 ft 0 in)
- Occupation: Politician
- Profession: Volleyball player

Leyla Felícita Chihuán Ramos (born September 4, 1975) is a Peruvian politician and former volleyball player of Afro-Peruvian descent, who twice represented her native country at the Summer Olympics. In 2011, she entered politics, serving as a Congresswoman until the dissolution of Congress in September 2019.

== Sports career ==
Chihuán played the 1996 Olympic Games and the 2000 Olympic Games ranking in both in 11th place; the 1998 World Championship, finishing in the ninth place, 2006 World Championship, ranking in 20th place. She ranked 11th in the 2007 FIVB World Cup and fifth in the 2009 Pan-American Cup. She was the captain of the Peruvian volleyball national team from 2005 to 2010.

Playing in Chiapas, Mexico with her National Senior Team, she won the Best Blocker award and the silver medal at the 2010 Final Four Cup.

Chihuán ranked in 15th place in the 2010 World Championship, and stated it would be her last tournament with her team and that she would step down as player and captain. After Peru's final match against China she told reporters in interviews that she did not leave because of some physical or age related issue but due to circumstances that she could not control.

She has played in several teams in Spain and Italy.

=== Clubs ===
- (Poland) Winiary Kalisz (1997-1999)
- (Italy) Rio Marsì Palermo (1999-2000)
- (Italy) Mirabilandia Teodora Ravenna (2000-2001)
- (Spain) CV Benidorm (2001-2007)
- (Spain) Gran Canaria Hotel Cantur (2007-2008)
- (Spain) Universidad de Burgos (2008-2009)
- (Spain) CV Miranda (2009-2010)
- (Peru) Regatas Lima (2009-2010)
- (Peru) Universidad César Vallejo (2013-2014)

=== Awards ===
==== Individuals ====
- 2009 South American Championship "Best Scorer"
- 2009 South American Championship "Best Spiker"
- 2010 Final Four Cup "Best Blocker"

==== National team ====
- 2005 Bolivarian Games, Gold Medal
- 2007 South American Championship, Silver Medal
- 2009 South American Championship, Bronze Medal
- 2010 Women's Pan-American Volleyball Cup, Silver Medal
- 2010 Final Four Women's Volleyball Cup, Silver Medal

== Political career ==
In 2011, Leyla Chihuán was elected to the Congress of Peru on the list of the fujimorist Fuerza 2011 party, representing the city of Lima. She was one of four female ex-volleyball players serving in Congress for the 2011-2016 term. Chihuán was re-elected in the 2016 general election. Her current term expires in 2021.

=== Accomplishments ===
In Congress, Leyla Chihuán has served on numerous committees, including the Health and Population Committee, the Education, Youth, and Sports Committee, the Foreign Relations Committee, and the Justice and Human Rights Committee. Chihuán is the vicepresident of the Congressional Leadership Board, the Leadership Council, the Spokespersons' Board, and the Permanent Committee for the current parliamentary session (2018-2019).

She has been the author or co-author of over 100 pieces of legislation or parliamentary resolutions on subjects ranging from health and sports, commerce and industry, Congressional ethics, and the protection of women and minors.

=== Controversy ===
In 2018, Leyla Chihuán was associated with a political scandal referred to as "Chats La Botica". "La Botica" was the title of a cell phone chat group among congressmen from her political party, Fuerza Popular, the contents of which were leaked to Peruvian authorities. The leaked messages included chats, in which Chihuán took part, which featured discussion of shielding judge César Hinostroza Pariachi, who was facing charges for corruption.

Nowadays in Peru when people wants to refer that they do not have money they say: "Estoy Bien Chihuan" the expression has become viral since her infamous comments when she said that the money earned working at the Congress was insufficient for her high living standard.
