= Alliance for the Progress of Peru =

Alliance for the Progress of Peru Alianza para el Progreso del Perú
- Leader: César Acuña
- Founded: 2015
- Dissolved: 2019
- Headquarters: Lima
- Ideology: Christian democracy Economic liberalism Social conservatism Liberal conservatism
- Political position: Centre-right
- Colours: Blue

Website
- www.app.pe

The Alliance for the Progress of Peru (Spanish: Alianza para el Progreso del Perú) was an electoral alliance in Peru formed for the 2016 general election, dominated by the eponymous party Alliance for Progress and led by former Governor of La Libertad César Acuña Peralta.

== Constituent parties ==
- Alliance for Progress (Alianza para el Progreso, APP), conservative, led by César Acuña
- National Restoration (Restauración Nacional, RN), evangelist, led by Humberto Lay
- We Are Peru (Somos Perú, SP), Christian democratic, led by Fernando Andrade

In the 2011 general election, the Alliance for Progress and National Restoration was part of the Alliance for the Great Change (Alianza por el Gran Cambio) while We Are Peru was part of the Possible Peru Alliance (Alianza Perú Posible).

In the congressional election on April 10, the alliance won 9.2% of the popular vote and 9 out of 130 seats, all going to the Alliance for Progress.

Presidential candidate César Acuña was barred from the election on 9 March 2016, by a decision of the Electoral Jury for allegedly vote buying in a campaign trail.

== Electoral history ==
=== Presidential election ===
Year	Candidate	Coalition	Votes	Percentage	Outcome
2016	César Acuña	Alliance for the Progress of Peru APP-RN-PDSP	Disqualified	N/A	N/A

=== Elections to the Congress of the Republic ===
Year	Votes	%	Seats	▲/▼	Position
2016	1 125 682	9.2%	9 / 130	▲7 (only for the APP)	Minority
