= Humberto Lay =

Peruvian minister, architect and politician (born 1934)

Pastor Humberto Lay
- 黎孙
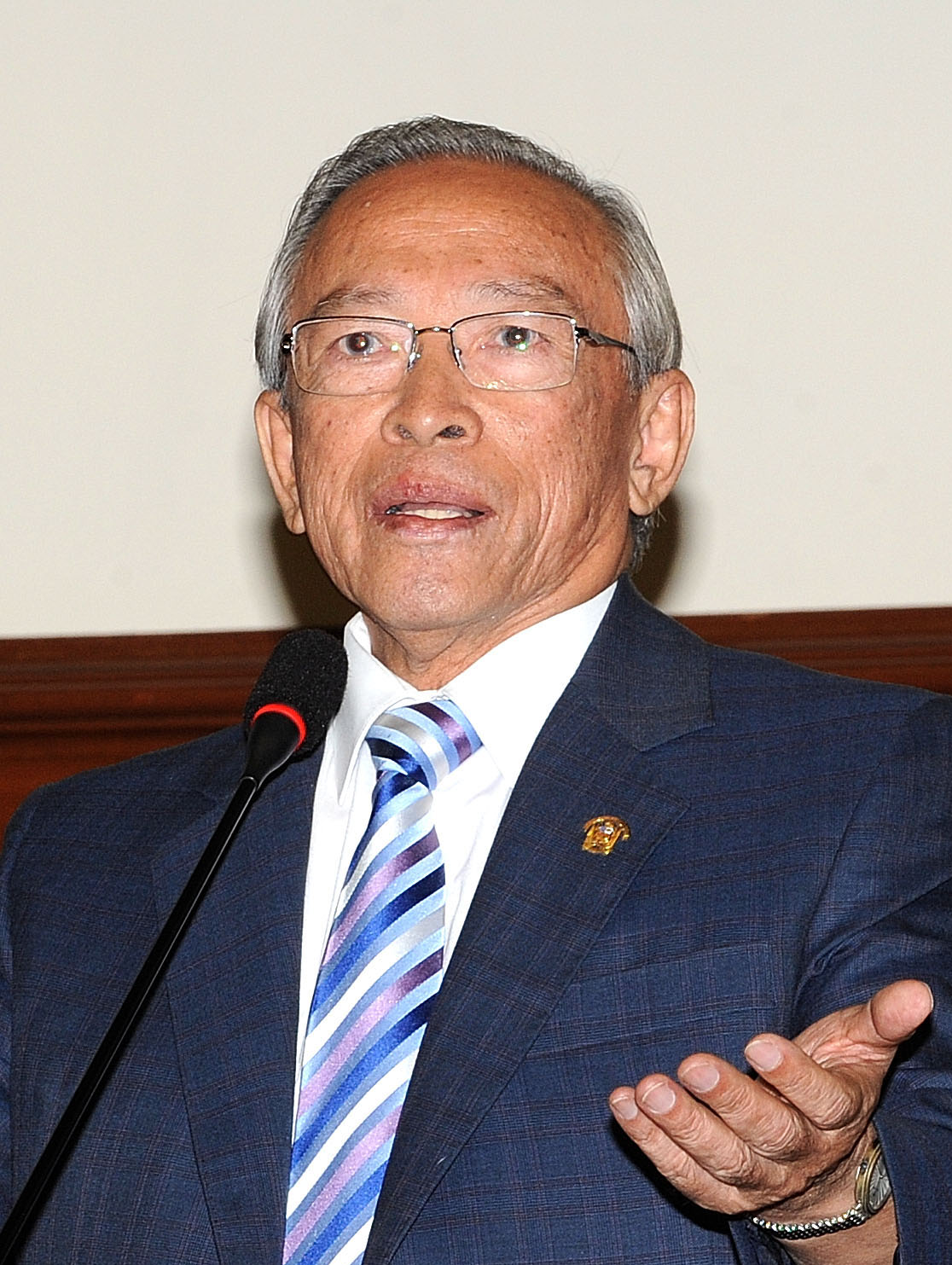
- Lay in 2012

President of the National Restoration Party
- In office 25 November 2005 – 10 May 2019
- Preceded by: Position established
- Succeeded by: Position disestablished

Member of Congress
- In office 26 July 2011 – 26 July 2016
- Constituency: Lima

Personal details
- Born: Humberto Lay Sun; 25 September 1934 (age 92) Lima, Peru
- Party: National Restoration
- Education: National University of Engineering
- Profession: Minister; architect; politician

Pastor Humberto Lay Sun (Chinese: 黎孙; pinyin: Lí Sūn; born 25 September 1934) is a Peruvian evangelical minister, architect, and politician belonging to the National Restoration Party. He is of Chinese descent. He studied at the Colegio San Andrés (Anglo-Peruvian School). He was also a commissioner on the Truth and Reconciliation Commission that investigated abuses by the Shining Path, Túpac Amaru Revolutionary Movement, and the Military of Peru during the 1980s and 1990s. He was a Congressman representing Lima for the 2011–2016 term.

== Education ==
From 1953 to 1957, he studied at the Universidad Nacional de Ingeniería and received an architecture degree. He started his professional career in his family's import business.

== Clerical activity ==
From 1979, on Lay was an important pastor in Alianza Cristiana y Misionera Church, whose largest temples he designed, thanks to his profession. Later, in October 1987, he founded the Iglesia Bíblica Emmanuel in Lima, the capital of Peru. Since then, this Christian church has developed successfully, and Pastor Lay has got a top position among the Christian leaders and pastors in Peru. This church works with young people, families and is a well-known missionary church.

Lay is the president of Unión Nacional de Iglesias Cristianas Evangélicas del Perú. He is also a member of the Fraternidad Internacional de Pastores Cristianos.

After the downfall of Alberto Fujimori's dictatorial regime in 2001, Lay was active in the National Anti-corruption Initiative and Commission of Truth and National Reconciliation.

Humberto Lay is a well-respected leader in the Christian evangelical world in Peru and abroad. Iglesia Biblica Emmanuel, which he founded in October 1987, is one of the most important churches in Peru and has many churches in several cities of Peru. Component of the Neopentecostal line, and served as its senior pastor from 1987 to April 2005. Lay left his position as main pastor at that church when he entered political life, and left his position to Ps. Saúl Gutiérrez, who is since then the main pastor.

== Political career ==
In November 2005, Lay founded the National Restoration party, a rally of socially conservative evangelicals, which he has chaired ever since until he resigned in May 2019.

Although Humberto Lay Sun ran unsuccessfully for president in the 2006 elections on the National Restoration ticket, obtaining 4.38% of the valid votes, the top political leaders in Peru have taken in count as he represents an important electoral base of evangelical Christians in Peru. His party also obtained 2 seats in Congress. He also ran for Mayor of Lima in the 2006, 2010 and 2018 municipal elections but lost to Luis Castañeda, Susana Villarán and Jorge Muñoz respectively.

=== Congressman ===
For the 2011 general elections, Lay integrated his National Restoration into the Alliance for the Great Change of Pedro Pablo Kuczynski and was elected Congressman, as the only member of his party, and as the eldest lawmaker in the 2011–2016 congressional period and also, being the most voted in the Alliance for the Great Change in which, he was the alliance’s list head for Lima. By unanimous decision, he was elected president of the Ethics Commission. Also, in his capacity as the oldest congressman, he was elected as first secretary of the Board of Directors of the Preparatory Board of Congress, the same one chaired by congressman Daniel Abugattás of Peru Wins.

=== 2016 elections ===
For the 2016 general elections, Lay ran for Second Vice President under the Alliance for Progress of Peru coalition in which his National Restoration integrated. He was part of the presidential ticket of Cesar Acuña but Acuña was disqualified on 9 March for attempted vote buying. He also withdrew his candidacy for re-election as Congressman.
