= Alliance for Progress (Peru) =

Political party in Peru

Alliance for Progress Alianza para el Progreso
- Abbreviation: APP
- President: César Acuña
- Secretary-General: Luis Valdez Farías
- Spokesperson: José Luis Echevarría Escribens
- Founded: December 8, 2001; 24 years ago
- Headquarters: Trujillo
- Ideology: Conservativism
- Political position: Right-wing
- Congress: 0 / 130
- Governorships: 2 / 25
- Regional Councillors: 29 / 274
- Province Mayorships: 17 / 196
- District Mayorships: 169 / 1,874

Website
- www.app.pe

Alliance for Progress (Spanish: Alianza para el Progreso, APP) is a Peruvian political party founded on December 8, 2001 in Trujillo by Cesar Acuña Peralta.

== History ==
The party was founded by Cesar Acuña Peralta in Trujillo in 2001, who was elected as Congressman for the National Solidarity Party in 2000. In 2006, the party participated in the general elections of that year with Natale Amprimo as its party candidate for President with the leader Cesar Acuña Peralta as its candidate for First Vice President. The presidential ticket itself attained 0.4% of the popular vote, placing tenth.

Following the 2006 general election's poor results, Alliance for Progress lost its party registration in the National Jury of Elections alongside the rest of the parties that failed to pass the threshold in 2007, but it regained its party registration the following year.

Having already established his party, Acuña was elected mayor of Trujillo in 2007 and was re-elected mayor in 2010.

Since 2010, the party was part of the Alliance for the Great Change, made up of Peruvian Humanist Party, Christian People's Party, National Restoration and Alliance for Progress, this alliance was led by Pedro Pablo Kuczynski, who unsuccessfully ran for president in the 2011 Peruvian general election. In these elections, APP obtained two of the 130 seats in the Congress of the Republic.

In June 2012, the National Office of Electoral Processes (ONPE) fined the party more than 9 million soles for having received contributions ten times greater than the allowed limit from the César Vallejo University, owned by César Acuña.

In 2014, Acuña was elected regional governor of the department of La Libertad, defeating José Murgia of APRA but, he resigned from his position as governor in less than one year to run for president in 2016.

By the time of the 2016 general election, the Alliance for the Great Change was no longer active. Instead, Alliance for Progress led the electoral coalition known as the Alliance for the Progress of Peru, alongside National Restoration and We Are Peru, nominating Acuña as its presidential candidate. However, on March 9, the National Elections Jury barred him from participating in the presidential election for violating the Political Parties Law. Despite his disqualification, the coalition participated in the congressional elections held on April 10, where it obtained 9.2% of the popular vote and won 9 out of 130 seats in the Congress.

The party later won 22 seats in the Congress following the 2020 snap parliamentary elections, an increase compared to its 2016 result.

For the 2021 general elections, Alliance for Progress formed an alliance with Christian People's Party. The alliance was officially signed on 12 October 2020, but lasted only six days, upon the revelation of disconformity from PPC's leadership, most prominently from the party Secretary General, Marisol Pérez Tello, who rejected Acuña by stating "she would not support a plagiarizer". Illegal audios were revealed by the press, and the alliance broke off almost immediately. Subsequently, Alliance for Progress nominated Cesar Acuña once again for the presidency and, he ultimately placed seventh with 6% of the popular vote in a heavily atomized election, managing to win La Libertad Region only, the party's stronghold, although the party achieved congressional representation, winning 15 seats, a loss of seven from the previous congressional term.

== Political position ==
The party has been described as supporting right-wing and far-right politics. Following Pedro Castillo's success in the first round of 2021 elections, party leader Cesar Acuña began a campaign tour promoting Fujimorism and Keiko Fujimori titled "Crusade for Peru", creating an alliance with her and stating to supporters at a rally "I forget acts of corruption of Fujimorism" while also condemning left-wing politics.

== Election results ==
=== Presidential ===
Election	Candidate	First round		Second round		Result
Election	Candidate	Votes	%	Votes	%	Result
2006	Natale Amprimo	49,332	0.40	—N/a		Lost ✗
2011	Pedro Pablo Kuczynski (Note: The party was an Alliance for the Great Change electoral coalition)	2,711,450	18.51	—N/a		Lost ✗
2016 (Note: The party was a member of Alliance for the Progress of Peru electoral coalition)	César Acuña	Disqualified				Lost ✗
2021	César Acuña	867,025	6.02	—N/a		Lost ✗
2026	César Acuña	192,516	1.15	—N/a		Lost ✗

=== Congressional ===
==== Unicameral Congress of the Republic ====
Election	Leader	Votes	%	Seats	+/–	Rank	Government
2006	César Acuña	248,400	2.31	0 / 120		8th	Extra-parliamentary
2011	César Acuña	1,851,080	14.42 (APGC)	2 / 130 (Note: from a total of 12 of Alliance for the Great Change)	▲2	▲4th	Minority
2016	César Acuña	1,125,682	9.23 (APPP)	4 / 130 (Note: from a total of 9 of Alliance for the Progress of Peru)	▲7	▲4th	Minority
2020	César Acuña	1,178,020	7.96	22 / 130	▲18	▲2nd	Minority
2021	César Acuña	969,726	7.54	15 / 130	▼7	▼4th	Minority

==== Chamber of Deputies ====
Election	Leader	Votes	%	Seats	+/–	Rank	Government
2026	César Acuña	401,468	2.78	0 / 130	▼15	▼9th	Extra-parliamentary

==== Senate ====
Election	Leader	Votes	%	Seats	+/–	Rank	Government
2026	César Acuña	392,855	2.66	0 / 60		▼10th	Extra-parliamentary

== See also ==
- APRA
- Popular Force
- Popular Action
- Politics of Peru
