= We Are Peru =

Political party in Peru

We Are Peru Democratic Party Partido Democrático Somos Perú
- Abbreviation: SP; PDSP
- Leader: Carlos Bruce
- President: Patricia Li
- Founder: Alberto Andrade
- Founded: 1995 (as We are Lima); 1 June 1997 (as We are Peru)
- Split from: Christian People's Party
- Headquarters: Av. Gral. Mendiburu 584, Miraflores, Lima
- Membership (2020): 121,577
- Ideology: Christian democracy; Conservatism
- Political position: Centre-right to right-wing
- Colours: Blue and red
- Congress: 0 / 130
- Governorships: 7 / 25
- Regional Councillors: 42 / 274
- Province Mayorships: 28 / 196
- District Mayorships: 171 / 1,874

Website
- www.somosperu.pe

The We Are Peru Democratic Party (Spanish: Partido Democrático Somos Perú, SP or PDSP) is a Christian democratic and conservative right-wing political party in Peru. It has party committees in nineteen regions of the country.

== History ==
=== Founding (1997–2000) ===
We Are Peru was formed in 1995 under the name of We Are Lima (Spanish: Somos Lima) as a personalist vehicle for mayoral candidate Alberto Andrade who broke from the Christian People's Party. Andrade was elected Mayor of Lima and became a leading figure of the opposition against then-president Alberto Fujimori. He was considered a main contender against Fujimori in the 2000 general election and was fiercely attacked by pro-government media, who successfully sought to diminish his popularity. Eventually, he gained only 3.0% of the votes.

=== 2000s ===
At the legislative elections, held on 8 April 2001, the party won 5.8% of the popular vote and 4 out of 120 seats in the unicameral Congress of the Republic.

By the time of the municipal and regional elections of 2002, We Are Peru had a certain party structure at the national level, and was able to present candidates for municipalities and regional governments in many parts of the country.

Andrade, for his part, stood for the second re-election as mayor of Lima. Soon Luis Castañeda Lossio of the National Solidarity Party, a member of the National Unity electoral alliance, would become his main rival during the campaign. Castañeda began to gain a lot of positive image when he began to visit the poorest and most remote areas of Lima. Despite the fact that all the voting intention polls put Andrade as the sure winner, Castañeda in a few weeks managed to tip the electorate in his favor. The results were 39.9% for Castañeda and 29.9% for Andrade.

The party participated in the 2006 elections as part of the Centre Front together with the Popular Action (AP). Alberto Andrade ran as the first running mate of AP leader Valentín Paniagua. Paniagua came in distant fifth with only 5.8% of the vote. In the congressional vote, the alliance won 7.1% of the vote and 5 seats in which, Andrade won a seat in Congress as the only congressman from We Are Peru. Once installed in the Congress of the Republic, the congressmen elected by the Frente de Centro formed a parliamentary group called the Parliamentary Alliance, together with the two congressmen from Peru Possible and the two from the National Restoration.

=== 2010s ===
In the 2011 election, both We Are Peru and AP joined the Possible Peru Alliance and endorsed the presidential candidacy of former President Alejandro Toledo, who finished fourth, while the alliance won 14.8% of the vote in the congressional election and We Are Peru won two seats. In 2013, We Are Peru was involved in the revocation process of the mayor of Lima Susana Villarán and her councilors supporting the "no" option. The party leadership made this decision appealing to considerations of democratic continuity and the need not to interfere in the public works that were being developed in the capital. In the 2016 election, We Are Peru joined the Alliance for the Progress of Peru of César Acuña. The alliance won 9.2% of the popular vote and 9 seats, but We Are Peru did not win a single seat, and was shut from Congress for the first time in 16 years. In 2018, the former mayor of the District of La Molina, Juan Carlos Zurek Pardo-Figueroa, ran for Mayor of Lima with Somos Perú, finishing in sixth place with 3.59% of the votes of Lima residents.

=== 2020s ===
At the legislative elections held on 26 January 2020, after 14 years of participating in electoral coalitions and alliances, the party itself won 6.1% of the popular vote and 11 out of 130 seats in the Congress of the Republic.

On 5 September 2020, Daniel Salaverry announced his official candidacy for the presidency of the Republic for the 2021 general election, under the We Are Peru party in which he had been affiliated since June of the same year. This was the first time that We Are Peru did not participate in general election coalitions since its foundation in 2000.

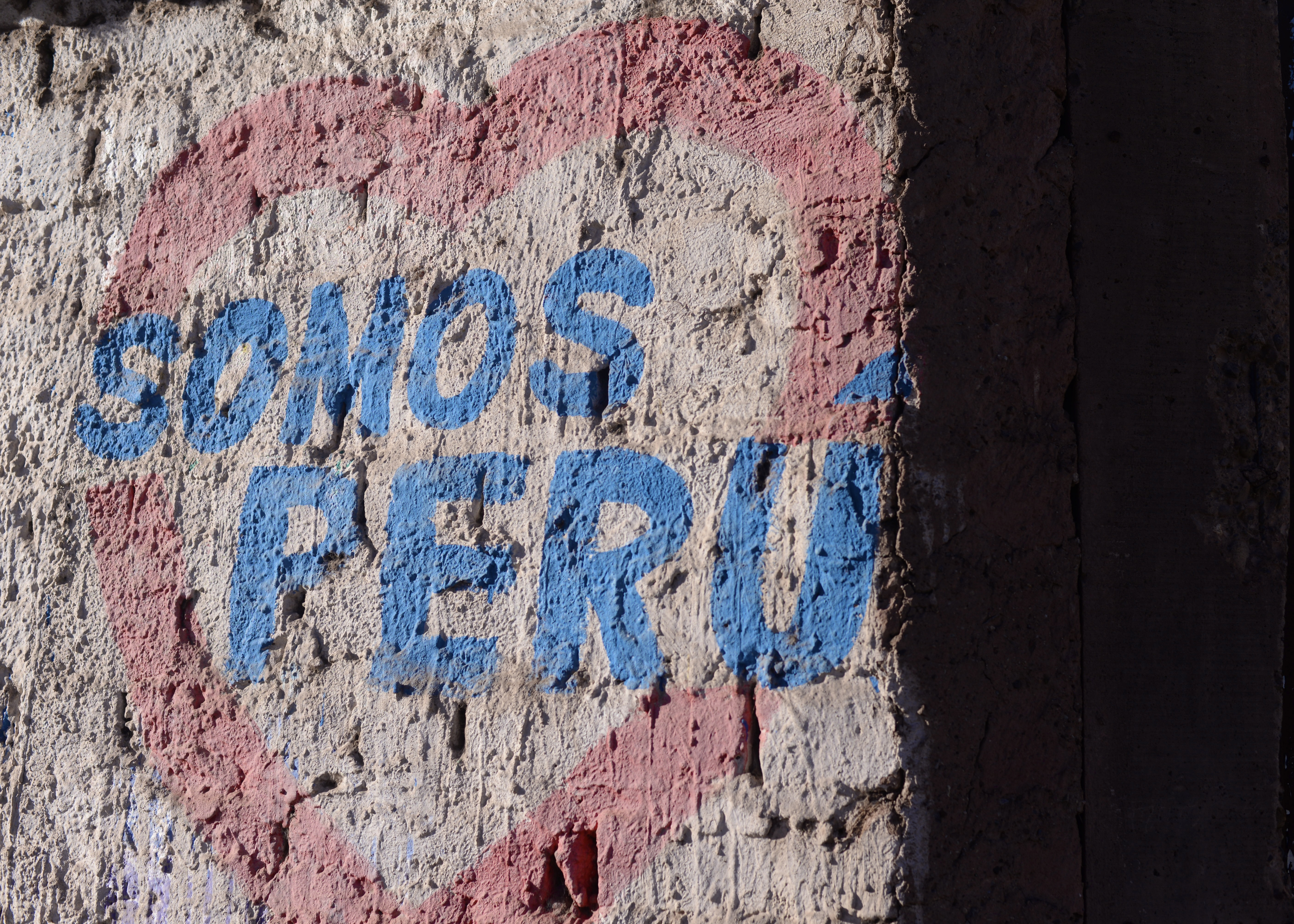
Graffiti in Urubamba promoting Somos Perú ahead of the 2026 Peruvian election.

Following the removal of President Martín Vizcarra due to charges of corruption, Vizcarra announced on 27 November 2020 that he would campaign for a seat in Congress for the 2021 general election, joining the We Are Peru party, which had just voted for his removal weeks before. The We Are Peru party's presidential candidate Daniel Salaverry welcomed Vizcarra to the party. If elected into Congress, Vizcarra would obtain parliamentary immunity from the investigations that resulted from his removal from the presidency. When asked if attempting to avoid prosecution for corruption was his motivation to run for congress, Vizcarra stated "One of the flags that I am going to carry in this electoral process, to be fulfilled in Congress if elected, is precisely to completely reform the concept of parliamentary immunity, it cannot be that the Congress of the Republic has used parliamentary immunity". Salaverry ultimately placed 11th in the race with 1.7% of the vote. While Vizcarra was elected to Congress, he was ultimately banned from holding any public offices for 10 years following to the Vacunagate scandal.

Following the impeachment and removal of Dina Boluarte, party member José Jerí assumed Peru's presidency in October 2025. He would later be censured and removed. The party lost all congressional seats in 2026.

== Political positions ==
The party aligns itself with Christian democracy. The party defends solidarity, the importance of the family and the social market economy. According to the ideology of the party, the state should play a promoter role and ensure that the economy is "at the service of man and not man at the service of the economy". In domestic politics, it supports decentralization.

== Election results ==
=== Presidential election ===
Year	Candidate	Party / Coalition	Votes	Percentage	Outcome
2000	Alberto Andrade	We Are Peru Democratic Party	333 048	3.00	3rd
2001	Jorge Santistevan	We Are Peru Democratic Party	Ticket withdrawn	N/A	N/A
2006	Valentín Paniagua	Centre Front AP-PDSP-TPP	706 156	5.75	5th
2011	Alejandro Toledo	Possible Peru Alliance PP-AP-PDSP	2 289 561	15.63	4th
2016	César Acuña	Alliance for the Progress of Peru APP-RN-PDSP	Disqualified	N/A	N/A
2021	Daniel Salaverry	We Are Peru Democratic Party	234,238	1.66	12th
2026	George Forsyth	We Are Peru Democratic Party	153,073	0.91	15th

=== Congressional elections ===
==== Unicameral Congress of the Republic ====
Year	Votes	%	Seats	▲/▼	Position
2000	715,396	7.2%	9 / 120	▲9	Minority
2001	544,193	5.8%	4 / 120	▼5	Minority
2006	760,245	7.1% as part of Centre Front. Only 1 from We are Peru.	5 / 120	▼3	Minority
2011	1,904,180	14.8% as part of Possible Peru Alliance. Only 2 from We are Peru.	21 / 130	▲1	Minority
2016	1,125,682	9.2% as part of Alliance for the Progress of Peru. None from We Are Peru.	9 / 130	▼2	N/A
2020	895,700	6.1%	11 / 130	▲11	Minority
2021	788,488	6.1%	5 / 130	▼6	Minority

==== Chamber of Deputies ====
Election	Leader	Votes	%	Seats	+/–	Rank	Government
2026	José Jerí	308,218	2.14	0 / 130	▼5	▼11th	Extra-parliamentary

==== Senate ====
Election	Leader	Votes	%	Seats	+/–	Rank	Government
2026	José Jerí	201,460	1.36	0 / 60		▼15th	Extra-parliamentary
