= Opinion polling for the 2006 Peruvian general election =

Opinion polling for the Peruvian General election, 2006

Opinion polling for the 2006 Peruvian national election was carried out by pollsters authorized by the National Election Jury both in the races for the Presidency and Congress.

Several candidates expressed skepticism about poll results and even accused the pollsters of deliberately lying. The Peruvian Association of Market Research (Asociación Peruana de Investigación de Mercados, APEIM) rejected such criticism and demanded formal apologies by those who accused the companies. APEIM also criticized the pollster IDICE, not belonging to the association, for critical flaws in its methodology. The company's results are nevertheless included in the section below.

Also, it is illegal to publish electoral opinion polls in Peru during the week prior to an election. Pollsters, however, released their results to the foreign press during the week before the First Round and these were widely available on the Internet. This drew criticism from electoral authorities, even though no law was technically broken.

== Poll results ==
The following is a collection of polls relating to the 2006 Peruvian national election. Only polls conducted nationwide are included, though some have an urban bias. The results below only consider the eventual top five presidential candidates, top six congressional lists and, in the case of the hypothetical runoff, matchups between the top three presidential candidates. Little information is available on the other options.

The dates indicate when each survey was conducted. If the sources are not clear about the precise dates, either the month or the date of publication is indicated. In the latter case, the date is marked with a (p).

Unless stated otherwise, entries correspond to percentages over the total number of votes. When reported in terms of "valid" votes, the percentages are included in parentheses. Valid votes are those cast for exactly one presidential ticket or one congressional party list, thus excluding blank, multiple-party votes and undecided voters. The official results consider only valid votes.

Entries with "n/a" correspond to instances in which the relevant question was not asked, the option was not given, or the quantity was not deemed significant enough when the survey was published.

The abbreviations used for parties are as follows (coalition members are indented):

- UPP - Union for Peru (Unión por el Perú)

- PNP - Peruvian Nationalist Party (Partido Nacionalista Peruano)

- PAP - Peruvian Aprista Party (Partido Aprista Peruano)
- UN - National Unity (Unidad Nacional)

- SN - National Solidarity (Solidaridad Nacional)

- AF - Alliance for the Future (Alianza por el Futuro)

- C90 - Change 90 (Cambio 90)
- NM - New Majority (Nueva Mayoría)

- FC - Center Front (Frente de Centro)

- AP - Popular Action (Acción Popular)
- SP - We Are Peru (Somos Perú)

- PP - Peru Possible (Perú Posible)
- SC - Sí Cumple

The abbreviations used for pollsters are:

- Apoyo - Apoyo Opinión y Mercado
- AyC - Analistas y Consultores
- Conecta - Conecta Asociados
- CPI - Compañía Peruana de Investigación de Mercados
  y Opinión Pública
- Datum - Datum Internacional
- IDICE - Instituto de Desarrollo e Investigación
  de Ciencias Económicas

- IMA - IMA Estudios de Marketing
- POP - Peruana de Opinión Pública
- PUCP - Instituto de Opinión Pública,
  Pontificia Universidad Católica del Perú
- UAP - Universidad Alas Peruanas
- UL - Grupo de Opinión Pública, Universidad de Lima
- UNI - Instituto de Investigaciones Económicas y Sociales,
  Universidad Nacional de Ingeniería

=== Presidential Election ===
The deadline for the registration of presidential candidates was 9 January 2006. Polls conducted before this date are more speculative in nature, since the final set of options was not yet known before then.

==== First round ====
Dates	Pollster	Source	O. Humala (UPP)	A. García (PAP)	L. Flores (UN)	M. Chávez (AF)	V. Paniagua (FC)
Jan 2005	Datum		3%	18%	17%	n/a	24%
1-8 April 2005	CPI		2.8%	17.5%	16.0%	7.2%	14.7%
Apr 2005	Apoyo		5%	21%	17%	n/a	23%
May 2005	Datum		3%	19%	23%	n/a	29%
June 2005	Datum		5%	20%	19%	n/a	16%
6–12 July 2005	CPI		2.3%	15.5%	17.5%	9.6%	12.8%
Aug 2005	Apoyo		7%	18%	22%	n/a	18%
Aug 2005	Datum		5%	20%	26%	n/a	19%
Sep 2005	Datum		5%	18%	23%	n/a	13%
10-14 October 2005	Apoyo		8%	17%	27%	n/a	15%
13-23 October 2005	IDICE		9.1%	23.6%	26.5%	n/a	7.6%
22-28 October 2005	CPI		5.1%	12.0%	27.6%	9.5%	10.0%
10-11 November 2005	Apoyo		11%	17%	28%	n/a	17%
12-15 November 2005	Datum		13%	16%	30%	n/a	15%
19-23 November 2005	CPI		15.0%	13.4%	25.6%	1.5%	11.3%
3-4 December 2005	UL		14.6%	16.2%	25.6%	2.4%	8.3%
3-8 December 2005	Apoyo		22%	16%	25%	n/a	14%
16-19 November 2005	Datum		23%	15%	26%	1%	12%
19-23 December 2005	IDICE		21.7%	19.8%	21.2%	n/a	16.7%
9-12 January 2006	IDICE		26.3%	20.3%	20.7%	7.0%	11.2%
11-13 January 2006	Apoyo		28%	15%	25%	2%	10%
13-14 January 2006	Datum		25%	14%	26%	n/a	11%
16-19 January 2006	POP		25%	14%	30%	2%	11%
20-22 January 2006	UL		16.8%	11.9%	28.1%	2.5%	7.2%
21-23 January 2006	AyC		19.5%	14.6%	30.9%	1.8%	14.2%
21-24 January 2006	CPI		18.2%	13.1%	28.8%	n/a	6.3%
25-27 January 2006	Apoyo		22%	13%	30%	n/a	8%
21-28 January 2006	IMA		18.7%	14.7%	27.2%	4.2%	5.5%
3-5 February 2006	IDICE		18.4%	20.8%	27.2%	8.1%	6.1%
8-10 February 2006	Apoyo		20% (25%)	13% (17%)	27% (35%)	4% (6%)	7% (8%)
10-11 February 2006	Datum		24% (28%)	15% (18%)	29% (34%)	4% (5%)	8% (10%)
11-15 February 2006	UAP		21.4%	16.8%	23.3%	3.5%	6.0%
15-17 February 2006	Conecta		18.3% (18.3%)	16.0% (20.5%)	27.3% (34.8%)	3.5% (4.4%)	8.6% (11.0%)
16-18 February 2006	AyC		19.4%	16.3%	29.2%	3.8%	4.9%
22-24 February 2006	Apoyo		19% (26%)	16% (22%)	24% (33%)	3% (4%)	5% (7%)
24-26 February 2006	PUCP		20% (25%)	14% (18%)	29% (35%)	4% (5%)	6% (8%)
24-26 February 2006	UL		20.6% (27.6%)	15.3% (20.5%)	25.1% (33.6%)	3.6% (4.8%)	6.4% (8.5%)
24-26 February 2006	IDICE		19.3%	22.4%	24.3%	7.1%	5.6%
26 February 2006 (p)	POP		22%	16%	30%	4%	n/a
23-27 February 2006	CPI		(25.5%)	(21.5%)	(34.1%)	(4.9%)	(7.8%)
24 February – 2 March 2006	IMA		21.6%	20.1%	26.9%	2.8%	4.5%
8-10 March 2006	Apoyo		22% (30%)	16% (22%)	23% (31%)	4% (5%)	4% (5%)
10-12 March 2006	Datum		26%	19%	27%	4%	8%
11-13 March 2006	IDICE		23.3%	22.8%	23.6%	5.0%	6.1%
15-17 March 2006	Apoyo		27% (32%)	17% (21%)	23% (28%)	6% (6%)	6% (7%)
15-19 March 2006	CPI		(31.6%)	(21.6%)	(21.9%)	(5.5%)	(6.0%)
18-19 March 2006	UNI		28.8%	16.3%	24.8%	3.8%	5.3%
19 March 2006	UAP		28.9%	16.9%	23.1%	5.5%	5.9%
20-22 March 2006	IDICE		26.8%	24.4%	21.6%	5.7%	4.7%
22-24 March 2006	Apoyo		27% (33%)	18% (22%)	22% (27%)	6% (7%)	5% (6%)
23-25 March 2006	Conecta		30.4% (30.4%)	18.3% (20.6%)	24.5% (27.7%)	5.1% (5.7%)	4.4% (5.0%)
24-26 March 2006	PUCP		27% (31%)	18% (20%)	24% (27%)	6% (7%)	6% (7%)
24-26 March 2006	UL		28.2% (32.6%)	19.9% (22.7%)	22.9% (26.1%)	5.4% (6.3%)	4.9% (5.6%)
27 March 2006 (p)	Datum		31%	21%	26%	6%	5%
27-31 March 2006	CPI		(31.5%)	(23.1%)	(26.8%)	(5.9%)	(6.7%)
27-31 March 2006	Apoyo		26% (31%)	19% (23%)	22% (26%)	6% (7%)	5% (6%)
4-6 April 2006	IDICE		27.7% (31.8%)	22.6% (25.9%)	19.6% (22.5%)	3.9% (4.5%)	7.5% (8.6%)
5 April 2006	Datum		(26%)	(24%)	(24%)	(8%)	(7%)
5 April 2006	UL		26.2% (29.2%)	19.7% (21.9%)	23.0% (25.6%)	7.4% (8.3%)	6.4% (7.2%)
8 April 2006	Apoyo		24% (27%)	21% (23%)	21% (23%)	7% (7%)	7% (8%)

==== Hypothetical Runoff Election (polls before First Round) ====
Dates	Pollster	Source	O. Humala (UPP) vs A. García (PAP)	O. Humala (UPP) vs L. Flores (UN)	A. García (PAP) vs L. Flores (UN)
13-23 October 2005	IDICE		n/a	n/a	35.4% - 42.1%
22-28 October 2005	CPI		n/a	n/a	23.6% - 51.5%
10-11 November 2005	Apoyo		30% - 31%	23% - 58%	23% - 56%
12-15 November 2005	Datum		n/a	23% - 58%	23% - 54%
3-4 December 2005	UL		33.0% - 34.5%	27.1% - 60.4%	25.9% - 59.6%
3-8 December 2005	Apoyo		44% - 31%	35% - 50%	26% - 54%
16-19 December 2005	Datum		n/a	34% - 50%	24% - 53%
11-13 January 2006	Apoyo		44% - 29%	39% - 46%	23% - 56%
13-14 January 2006	Datum		41% - 28%	35% - 50%	25% - 52%
20-22 January 2006	UL		34.2% – 32.9%	27.7% - 51.1%	22.6% - 60.0%
25-27 January 2006	Apoyo		40% - 30%	34% - 52%	22% - 57%
21-28 January 2006	IMA		31.5% - 29.2%	27.5% - 46.0%	22.9% - 44.6%
8-10 February 2006	Apoyo		37% - 35% (51% - 49%)	33% - 52% (39% - 61%)	27% - 54% (33% - 67%)
10-11 February 2006	Datum		n/a	34% - 50%	25% - 54%
11-15 February 2006	UAP		34.9% - 28.3%	32.6% - 42.8%	24.8% - 44.6%
15-17 February 2006	Conecta		32% - 29%	31% - 48%	26% - 45%
22-24 February 2006	Apoyo		36% – 37% (50% - 50%)	34% - 50% (40% - 60%)	31% - 50% (38% - 62%)
23-27 February 2006	CPI		34.8% - 37.5% (48.1% - 51.9%)	31.1% - 48.6% (39.0% - 61.0%)	29.0% - 47.9% (37.7% - 62.3%)
24-26 February 2006	PUCP		33.7% – 33.5%	30.2% - 50.5%	26.8% - 51.1%
24-26 February 2006	UL		36.7% – 32.3%	33.3% - 49.6%	27.1% - 52.2%
24 February – 2 March 2006	IMA		32.3% - 33.8%	28.8% - 43.1%	28.4% - 40.9%
8-10 March 2006	Apoyo		41% - 36% (52% - 47%)	39% - 46% (46% - 54%)	32% - 47% (41% - 59%)
10-12 March 2006	Datum		40% - 33%	36% - 47%	29% - 48%
15-17 March 2006	Apoyo		45% - 33% (57% - 43%)	43% - 44% (50% - 50%)	33% - 46% (41% - 59%)
15-19 March 2006	CPI		38.5% – 32.0% (54.3% - 45.7%)	36.6% - 41.5% (47.1% - 52.9%)	29.0% - 43.2% (40.5% - 59.5%)
18-19 March 2006	UNI		39.1% - 29.6%	37.5% - 40.4%	28.3% - 42.9%
19 March 2006	UAP		39.5% - 29.5%	38.8% - 38.8%	28.2% - 41.2%
22-24 March 2006	Apoyo		42% - 39% (52% - 48%)	40% - 47% (47% - 53%)	35% - 46% (43% - 57%)
23-25 March 2006	Conecta		41% - 33%	39% - 41%	31% - 41%
24-26 March 2006	PUCP		(53% - 47%)	(45% - 55%)	(41% - 59%)
24-26 March 2006	UL		43.9% - 36.7%	41.3% - 46.6%	31.5% - 48.0%
27-31 March 2006	Apoyo		39% - 37% (51% - 49%)	38% - 46% (45% - 55%)	32% - 45% (42% - 58%)
27-31 March 2006	CPI		(49.7 - 50.3%)	(44.9% - 55.1%)	(41.5% - 58.5%)
5 April 2006	UL		37.7% - 41.3%	37.3% - 48.6%	n/a

==== Runoff Election (polls after First Round) ====
Dates	Pollster	Source	Ollanta Humala (UPP)	Alan García (PAP)
19-21 April 2006	Datum		37% (46%)	43% (54%)
29 April – 1 May 2006	Datum		34% (44%)	43% (56%)
28 April – 3 May 2006	IDICE		34.8% (45.9%)	42.5% (55.0%)
19-21 April 2006	Apoyo		34% (43%)	44% (57%)
2–7 May 2006	CPI		(38.6%)	(61.4%)
6–8 May 2006	Datum		33% (43%)	44% (57%)
10–12 May 2006	Apoyo		34% (44%)	43% (56%)
12–14 May 2006	UL		31.1% (38.1%)	50.6% (61.9%)
18–19 May 2006	Datum		35% (42%)	47% (58%)
18–21 May 2006	PUCP		35% (46%)	42% (54%)
19–21 May 2006	UL		31.3% (38.8%)	49.3% (61.2%)
24–25 May 2006	CPI		(40.1%)	(59.9%)
23–26 May 2006	IDICE		36.8% (36.8%)	48.2% (56.7%)
24–26 May 2006	Apoyo		36% (45%)	44% (55%)
25–26 May 2006	Datum		(42%)	(58%)
27 May 2006 (p)	Conecta		34.7% (43.1%)	45.8% (56.9%)
30–31 May 2006	Apoyo		(47%)	(53%)
31 May 2006	Datum		(43%)	(57%)
31 May 2006	UL		(44.1%)	(55.9%)
31 May – 1 June 2006	CPI		(46.2%)	(53.8%)
3 June 2006	Apoyo		(47%)	(53%)

=== Congressional Election ===
The deadline for the registration of congressional candidates was 8 February 2006. Polls conducted before this date are more speculative. For many of these early polls, several coalitions were not even official, so some responses included parties which did not end up running by themselves. These are included in some entries below, along with the appropriate abbreviation as outlined above.

In particular, while the Sí Cumple party did not officially belong to Alliance for the Future, pollsters themselves often lumped it together with the other fujimorista movements before the AF coalition came into being, largely due to the perception that the same politicians belonged to these parties. This is not technically correct, but Sí Cumple results are still included below, though with an asterisk to make the difference clear (SC*).

Projected seat allocation in Congress, out of 120 seats, are included in square brackets when available.

Dates	Pollster	Source	UPP	PAP	UN	AF	FC	PP
13-23 October 2005	IDICE		10.7% PNP	17.7%	13.1%	11.1% SC*	7.9% AP; 5.3% SP	2.2%
22-28 October 2005	CPI		3.4% PNP	13.8%	14.3% 10.4% SN	8.6% SC*	10.2% AP; 3.1% SP	1.3%
10-11 November 2005	Apoyo		8%	17%	15%	12% C90/NM/SC*	8% AP; 4% SP	2%
12-15 November 2005	Datum		2% PNP	15%	17%	9% C90/SC*	9% AP; 2% SP	2.2%
3-4 December 2005	UL		1.6%	17.1%	18.2%	6.4% SC*	10.6% AP	2.3%
16-19 December 2005	Datum		9% PNP	17%	24%	4% SC*	5%	n/a
19-23 December 2005	IDICE		14.9% PNP	18.7%	16.3%	6.8% SC*	15.0%	3.6%
9-12 January 2006	IDICE		22.9%	19.1%	17.8%	7.7%	11.3%	5.0%
11-13 January 2006	Apoyo		12%	15%	17%	2% 6% SC*	7%	1%
20-22 January 2006	UL		8.2%	20.2%	14.6%	2.8%	5.6%	2.5%
21-28 January 2006	IMA		4.4%	7.7%	7.8%	2.2%	2.7%	0.2%
8-10 February 2006	Apoyo		10% (15%)	13% (21%)	18% (27%)	4% (7%)	6% (10%)	2% (3%)
10-11 February 2006	Datum		8%	14%	16%	n/a	4%	1%
22-24 February 2006	Apoyo		9% (15%)	26% (16%)	14% (22%)	4% (6%)	6% (9%)	2% (4%)
24-26 February 2006	PUCP		6.0% (10.8%)	13.5% (21.1%)	16.7% (26.1%)	3.6% (5.7%)	4.2% (6.6%)	3.2% (5.0%)
24-26 February 2006	IDICE		12.6% [17 seats]	17.8% [34 seats]	15.4% [21 seats]	10.6% [16 seats]	7.8% [10 seats]	2.0% [1 seat]
24-26 February 2006	UL		6.5% (10.5%)	14.7% (23.5%)	14.8% (23.7%)	3.9% (6.3%)	6.9% (11.0%)	3.0% (4.9%)
23-27 February 2006	CPI		8.1% (13.6%)	13.6% (22.7%)	14.3% (23.5%)	3.1% (5.2%)	8.7% (14.6%)	1.9% (3.2%)
24 February – 2 March 2006	IMA		8.5%	14.8%	13.7%	3.7%	4.5%	1.4%
8-10 March 2006	Apoyo		11% (17%)	15% (23%)	13% (20%)	6% (9%)	5% (8%)	2% (3%)
10-12 March 2006	Datum		13%	17%	18%	6%	6%	2%
11-13 March 2006	IDICE		14.2%	18.9%	15.9%	8.8%	8.1%	2.0%
15-17 March 2006	Apoyo		12% (16%)	16% (22%)	13% (18%)	8% (12%)	5% (7%)	3% (4%)
15-19 March 2006	CPI		9.2% (15.5%)	13.1% (21.4%)	11.8% (18.9%)	6.7% (10.5%)	6.0% (9.7%)	3.8% (5.8%)
18-19 March 2006	UNI		16.8%	17.2%	17.0%	6.1%	6.8%	n/a
22-24 March 2006	Apoyo		11% (16%)	14% (21%)	11% (16%)	8% (11%)	5% (7%)	4% (6%)
23-25 March 2006	Conecta		15.8% (20.9%)	17.2% (22.7%)	17.4% (23.0%)	5.2% (6.9%)	4.8% (6.3%)	2.5% (3.3%)
24-26 March 2006	PUCP		14.1%	15.1%	16.1%	9.4%	4.5%	2.6%
24-26 March 2006	UL		10.7% (14.2%)	15.8% (21.0%)	14.2% (18.8%)	8.5% (11.3%)	6.5% (8.6%)	4.1% (5.5%)
27-31 March 2006	Apoyo		11% (16%) [31 seats]	14% (19%) [36 seats]	12% (16%) [25 seats]	11% (15%) [15 seats]	6% (9%) [8 seats]	4% (6%) [5 seats]
5 April 2006	Datum		[36 seats]	[36 seats]	[23 seats]	[17 seats]	[8 seats]	[0 seats]
5 April 2006	UL		11.6% (14.6%)	15.4% (19.4%)	13.5% (17.0%)	11.8% (14.8%)	5.8% (7.4%)	3.8% (4.9%)
8 April 2006	Apoyo		[29 seats]	[38 seats]	[24 seats]	[14 seats]	[9 seats]	[3 seats]

== See also ==
- 2006 Peruvian national election
