= New Majority (Peru) =

Peruvian political party (1992–2010)

New Majority Nueva Mayoría
- Abbreviation: NM
- Leader: Martha Chávez
- Founder: Jaime Yoshiyama
- Founded: 11 September 1992
- Dissolved: 9 March 2010
- Succeeded by: Popular Force
- Ideology: Fujimorism
- Political position: Right-wing
- National affiliation: Cambio 90 – New Majority (1992–1999, 2001–2005); Peru 2000 (1999–2001); Alliance for the Future (2005–2006)

New Majority (Spanish: Nueva Mayoría, NM), was a Peruvian right-wing political party founded in 1992 for the Democratic Constituent Congress election held on the same year. Throughout the 1990s until late-2000, was the most powerful political party in Peru alongside Cambio 90, serving more as an instrumental electoral vehicle for Alberto Fujimori.

== History ==
The party was the second of the three parties established by Fujimorism during the 1990s, the first being Cambio 90, with both parties running allied for the 1992 Democratic Constituent Congress election and in the 1995 general election. For the 2000 general election, it ran under the third Fujimorist political group formed, the Peru 2000 alliance, which grouped Cambio 90 and Vamos Vecino.

During the 2000 elections, Martha Chávez suggested that Fujimori would dissolve Congress if Peru 2000 did not win a majority of seats. She also said that she could not rule out a fourth election of Fujimori, despite the fact that the Constitution of Peru which was written in part by Chávez herself allows presidents to be elected no more than twice in a row. Indeed, Chávez had earlier promised that Fujimori would not run in the 2000 elections. However, Fujimori ran instead.

In the aftermath of Alberto Fujimori's downfall in late-2000, the party participated alongside Cambio 90 at the 2001 general election, only running for Congress. However, in 2001, during the government of Alejandro Toledo, Luz Salgado and Carmen Lozada were suspended from Congress as there were indications that linked them to crimes of corruption. In 2002, Martha Chávez was suspended indefinitely while the Judiciary investigated her alleged links with corruption, after three years, she returned to Congress at the end of 2005, being declared acquitted of the charges for which she was accused and she was compensated the wages not received during their suspension. In 2003, due to the absence of Fujimori and the lack of activity of the other Fujimori parties, Nueva Mayoría separated under the leadership of Martha Chávez. They got its registry in 2004. In 2005, Congresswoman Martha Chávez reconvened the party and formally announced her candidacy for the presidency at the 2006 general election, as the electoral authorities rejected Fujimori's ticket with Sí Cumple. Under the Alliance for the Future coalition, New Majority ran alongside Cambio 90. At the presidential race, Chávez placed fourth failing to qualify in the June run-off, while in the congressional election, the congressional list got 13 congressmen out of 120 seats and received the most votes in Pasco. After the 2006 elections, all of the 13 representatives elected on the Alliance for the Future lists has formed the Fujimorist Parliamentary Group (Spanish: Grupo Parlamentario Fujimorista) in Congress.

== Dissolution ==
Following the establishment of Popular Force in 2010 by Fujimori's daughter Keiko, New Majority ceased to exist in 2012, as their registration was cancelled by the National Jury of Elections for not participating in the 2011 general election. Most of its members ran for office with Popular Force, and ultimately switched their affiliations.

== Electoral history ==
=== Presidential elections ===
Year	Candidate	Party / Coalition	Votes	Percentage	Outcome
1995	Alberto Fujimori	Cambio 90-New Majority Electoral Alliance	4 645 279	64.42	1st
2000	Alberto Fujimori	Peru 2000 C90-NM-JSP-VV	1st Round: 5 528 568	1st Round: 49.87	1st Round: 1st
2000	Alberto Fujimori	Peru 2000 C90-NM-JSP-VV	2nd Round: 6 041 685	2nd Round: 74.33	2nd Round: 1st
2006	Martha Chávez	Alliance for the Future C90-NM-SC	912 740	7.43	4th

=== Elections to the Congress of the Republic ===
Year	Votes	%	Number of seats	▲/▼	Position
1995	2 193 724	51.1%	67 / 120	▲23	Majority
2000	4 189 019 as part of Peru 2000	42.2%	52 / 120	▼15	Minority
2001	452 696	4.8%	3 / 120	▼49	Minority
2006	1 408 055 as part of Alliance for the Future	13.1%	13 / 120	▲10	Minority

=== Elections to the Democratic Constituent Congress ===
Year	Votes	%	Number of seats	Position
1992	3 040 552	49.2%	44 / 80	Majority
