= Oswaldo de la Cruz =

Peruvian politician

Member of Congress
- In office 26 July 2006 – 26 July 2011
- Constituency: Pasco

Mayor of Pasco Province
- In office 1 January 1999 – 31 December 2002

Personal details
- Born: Oswaldo de la Cruz Vásquez; 5 October 1940 (age 86) Cerro de Pasco, Pasco, Pasco, Peru
- Party: Alliance for the Future; Vamos Vecino
- Occupation: Politician

Oswaldo de la Cruz Vásquez (born 5 October 1940) is a Peruvian former Fujimorist politician and Congressman, elected in the 2006 elections to represent the Pasco Region under the Alliance for the Future party for the 2006–2011 term. In the 1998 municipal elections, de la Cruz was elected as the Provincial Mayor of Pasco under the Vamos Vecino party, close to-then President Alberto Fujimori and served from 1999 to 2002. De la Cruz belongs to the Alliance for the Future. During his tenure as a congressman, he participated in the formulation of 194 bills, of which 45 were promulgated as laws of the republic.

== Biography ==
He was born in Cerro de Pasco, Peru, on October 5, 1940. He studied primary and secondary school in his hometown and, between 1968 and 1971, he studied mining engineering at the Daniel Alcides Carrión National University.
