= Cambio 90 – New Majority =

Cambio 90 – New Majority Alianza Electoral Cambio 90 — Nueva Mayoría
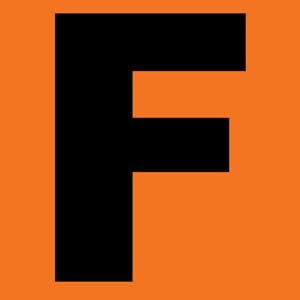
- Abbreviation: C90—NM
- Leader: Alberto Fujimori
- Founder: Jaime Yoshiyama
- Founded: 1992
- Dissolved: 2005
- Succeeded by: Alliance for the Future (2005-2010)
- Ideology: Fujimorism
- Political position: Right-wing
- National affiliation: Peru 2000 (1999-2001)
- Members: Cambio 90; New Majority

Party flag

Cambio 90 – New Majority (Spanish: Alianza Electoral Cambio 90 — Nueva Mayoría, C90—NM) was a Peruvian right-wing electoral alliance eponymously formed by pro-Fujimorist parties Cambio 90 and New Majority which ruled Peru from 1992 to 2000, serving more as an instrumental electoral vehicle for Alberto Fujimori.

== History ==
The alliance was formed in 1992 for the Democratic Constituent Congress election of that year in which they won a majority in the Democratic Constituent Congress and once again in the 1995 general election. In the 2000 general election, Cambio 90 and New Majority were part of Peru 2000 and the alliance was briefly dissolved.

In the aftermath of Alberto Fujimori's downfall in late 2000, the alliance was once again revived and participated at the 2001 general election, only running for Congress and only won 3 seats in Congress. For the 2006 general election, the alliance was dissolved and Cambio 90 and New Majority participated under the Alliance for the Future.

== Electoral history ==
=== Presidential elections ===
Year	Candidate	Coalition	Votes	Percentage	Outcome
1995	Alberto Fujimori	Cambio 90 – New Majority Electoral Alliance	4 645 279	64.42	1st

=== Elections to the Congress of the Republic ===
Year	Leader	Votes	%	Number of seats	▲/▼	Position
1995	Alberto Fujimori	2 193 724	51.1%	67 / 120	▲23	Majority
2000	Alberto Fujimori	4 189 019 participated under Peru 2000	42.2%	52 / 120	▼19	Minority
2001	Alberto Fujimori	452 696	4.8%	3 / 120	▼49	Minority

=== Democratic Constituent Congress elections ===
Year	Leader	Votes	%	Number of seats	▲/▼	Position
1992	Alberto Fujimori	3 040 552	49.2%	44 / 80	▲44	Majority
