= Ántero Asto =

Peruvian educator and politician

Ántero Asto Flores is a Peruvian educator and politician. He was Peruvian Resurgence's presidential candidate for the 2006 national election.

== See also ==
- Politics of Peru
