= Arturo Woodman =

Peruvian politician (1931–2023)

Personal details
- Born: Arturo Woodman Pollit; 16 October 1931; Piura, Peru
- Died: 2 July 2023 (aged 91)
- Political party: National Unity
- Profession: Politician

Arturo Woodman Pollit (16 October 1931 – 2 July 2023) was a Peruvian engineer and politician. He was National Unity's candidate for First Vice President of the 2006 general election, as the running mate of Lourdes Flores Nano. The ticket placed third and failed to qualify in the run-off.

Woodman was the president of the Peruvian Sports Institute, having successfully led the organization of the 2004 Copa América and the 2005 U-17 World Championship.

Woodman died on 2 July 2023, at the age of 91.
