= Luis Guerrero =

Luis Guerrero may refer to:

- Luis Guerrero (baseball) (born 2000), Dominican baseball player
- Luis Guerrero (politician) (born 1953), Peruvian politician
