= Avanza País (Peru, 2017) =

Political party in Peru

Avanza País – Social Integration Party Avanza País – Partido de Integración Social
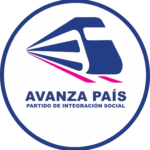
- Abbreviation: AvP
- President: Aldo Borrero
- General Secretary: Luis Ernesto Flores
- Founded: 10 May 2017
- Preceded by: Avanza País (2000)
- Headquarters: Lima
- Ideology: Liberalism (Peruvian); Conservatism (Peruvian); Economic liberalism; Conservative liberalism
- Political position: Right-wing
- Congress: 0 / 130
- Governorships: 1 / 25
- Regional Councillors: 17 / 274
- Province Mayorships: 10 / 196
- District Mayorships: 74 / 1,874

Website
- http://avanzapais.org.pe/
- Politics of Peru; Political parties; Elections; A: Also described as centre-right and far-right

Avanza País – Social Integration Party (Spanish: Avanza País – Partido de Integración Social; lit. 'Go on Country' or 'Country Advances') is a right-wing conservative liberal political party in Peru. In 2020, almost 15 years since its last participation in a general election, economist Hernando de Soto registered in the party in order to run for the presidency at the 2021 general election. He placed fourth in the election.

== History ==
In early 2005, a party under the same name registered in the National Elections Jury and participated in the 2006 general election. At the legislative elections held on 9 April 2006, the party won 1.1% of the popular vote but no seats in the Congress of the Republic and its presidential ticket itself attained 0.2%, placing fourteenth nationally. After losing its formal registration as a political organization, the party began a re-founding stage on May 10, 2017, culminating in a new registration on the same year.

In the legislative election held on 26 January 2020, the party won 2.5% of the popular vote but no seats in the Congress of the Republic, as it failed to pass once again the 5% electoral threshold. In the legislative election held on 11 April 2021, the party won 7.5% of the popular vote and 7 seats in the Congress of the Republic.

In December 2021, Hernando de Soto left the party following a dispute for its control between Aldo Borrero Rojas, the leader of the party, and Edwin de la Cruz Ponce, the general secretary, who was previously removed but continued to denounce his removal. Following his departure, De Soto described the party as being far-right after members of Advance Country supported amnesty for authorities following massacres in Ayacucho and Juliaca during the widespread protests against President Dina Boluarte.

== Ideology ==
The original iteration of the party described itself as a centrist party in support of social democracy and social conservatism, while Infobae described it as ultranationalist in 2006. More recently, the party has been described as a supporter of far-right politics, though some media in Peru describe the party as center-right. Its members in the Congress of Peru have been described as being part of a "far-right" bloc allied with Popular Force and Popular Renewal.

Representatives of the party signed the Madrid Charter, an anti-leftist manifesto organized by the conservative Spanish party Vox. Economically, the party embraces classical liberalism and economic liberalism, generally supporting free markets.

The party does not have an official stance on social issues as it once did, as can be evidenced by the fact that the respective leading figures for de Soto's presidential campaign, Instituto Politico para la Libertad Peru (IPL) vice president, Beltrán Gomez Hijar, and IPL member and congressman Alejandro Cavero, have supported pro-LGBT and pro-choice causes, whereas congresswoman Adriana Tudela, daughter of former Vice President Francisco Tudela, is opposed to abortion.

Under de Soto's leadership, the party is described by analysts and pundits as right-leaning on the political spectrum. According to Georgetown University political scientist Eliana Carlín, de Soto was the one who chose the party for his election run, and the party welcomed him due to his international prominence in the economic academia. In Carlin's opinion, the party is an "electoral vehicle" that reached an agreement with de Soto and that "they are not interested in ideology".

== Controversies ==
Avanza País, in a journalistic column of RPP, was accused of surrogacy due to the incorporation of members who had no relationship with the party months prior. Despite this, party president Pedro Cenas rejected the notion of his party functioning as a surrogate and stated that "politics is not a commodity, but an act of faith and integration".

== Election results ==
=== Presidential ===
Election	Candidate	First round		Second round		Result
Election	Candidate	Votes	%	Votes	%	Result
2021	Hernando de Soto	1,674,201	11.63	—N/a		Lost ✗
2026	José Williams	32,585	0.20	—N/a		Lost ✗

=== Congressional ===
==== Unicameral Congress of the Republic ====
Election	Votes	%	Seats	+/–	Position
2020	373,113	2.5	0 / 130	Steady	Extra-parliamentary
2021	969,059	7.5	7 / 130	▲7	Opposition

==== Chamber of Deputies ====
Election	Leader	Votes	%	Seats	+/–	Rank	Government
2026	Aldo Borrero	120,160	0.83	0 / 130	▼7	▼22th	Extra-parliamentary

==== Senate ====
Election	Leader	Votes	%	Seats	+/–	Rank	Government
2026	Aldo Borrero	74,251	0.50	0 / 60		▼24th	Extra-parliamentary

=== Regional and municipal elections ===
Election	Regional governors	Provincial mayors	District mayors
Election	Outcome	Outcome	Outcome
2018	0 / 25	4 / 196	18 / 1,874
