= Broad Left Front (Peru) =

Broad Left Front Frente Amplio de Izquierda
- Founded: November 2005
- Ideology: Socialism; Communism; Patriotism
- Political position: Left-wing

Broad Left Front (in Spanish: Frente Amplio de Izquierda) is a political coalition of leftist parties and movements in Peru.

== Participants ==
The organizations that constituted FAI were as follows:

- New Left Movement (Movimiento Nueva Izquierda)
- Popular Front (Frente Popular)
- Peruvian Communist Party (Partido Comunista Peruano)
- Communist Party of Peru (Red Fatherland) (Partido Comunista del Perú - Patria Roja)
- Worker Peasant Student and Popular Front (Frente Obrero Campesino Estudiantil Popular)
- Revolutionary Socialist Party (Partido Socialista Revolucionario)
- Malpica Committee (Comité Malpica)
- United People Movement (Movimiento Pueblo Unido)
- Nationalist Party of the Andina Communities (Partido Nacionalista de las Comunidades Andinas)
- Popular Democratic Front (Frente Democrático Popular)

== History ==
Initially, the organization was known as National Coordination of Left-wing and Progressive Parties (Coordinadora Nacional de Izquierda y Partidos Progresistas). It took the name Frente Amplio de Izquierda in November 2005.

In the elections of 2006, the FAI decided to withhold support for the presidential candidacy of Ollanta Humala and his Peruvian Nationalist Party, and nominated Alberto Moreno, chairman of Peru's communist party, as its own presidential candidate. Subsequently, some long-time leftists, such as Ricardo Letts Colmenares, left the FAI.

In the elections, Moreno received 0.3% of the vote, coming in 12th.
