= Luis Enrique Carpio =

Peruvian politician (born 1930)

Personal details
- Born: Luis Enrique Carpio Ascuña; 1930 (age 95–96) Piura, Peru
- Party: National Unity
- Profession: Politician

Luis Enrique Carpio Ascuña (born 1930 in Arequipa) is a Peruvian teacher and politician. He was National Unity's candidate for Second Vice President at the 2006 Peruvian national election, running along with Lourdes Flores Nano. The ticket placed third and failed to qualify in the run-off.

He has been the Dean of the University of Santa María.
