= Democratic Reconstruction =

Political party in Peru

Democratic Reconstruction Reconstrucción Democrática

The Democratic Reconstruction (Spanish: Reconstrucción Democrática) is a minor Peruvian political party. At the 2006 Peruvian general election, the party won less than 1% of the popular vote and no seats in the Congress of the Republic.
