= Pedro Koechlin von Stein =

Peruvian politician and entrepreneur

Pedro Koechlin von Stein is a Peruvian politician and entrepreneur. He was With Force Peru's presidential candidate for the 2006 national election. He received 0.3% of the vote, coming in 11th place.

His politics is centered on environment-friendly policies in a so-called "Blue Proposal".

He is the majority owner of airline Wayra Peru. He was expelled from the country in 1971 by General Juan Velasco's government, after organizing a Carlos Santana concert at the University of San Marcos, in the first "mega-concert" in Latin America.
