= Gonzalo García Núñez =

Peruvian politician (1947–2024)

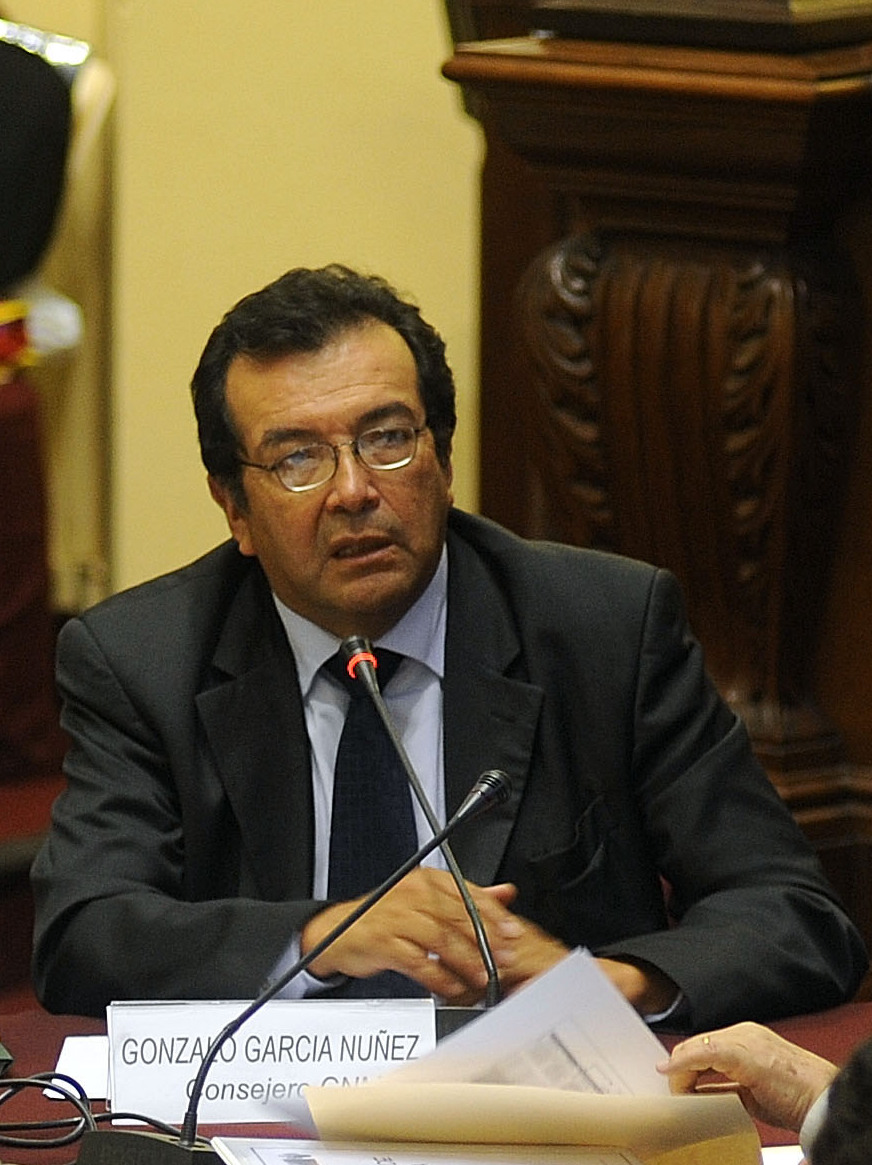
- Núñez in 2012

Lima City Councilman
- In office 1 January 1984 – 31 December 1989

Personal details
- Born: Gonzalo García Núñez; 16 February 1947 Lima, Peru
- Died: 8 January 2024 (aged 76)
- Party: Peruvian Nationalist Party
- Other political affiliations: Union for Peru; United Left; Socialist Left
- Education: National University of Engineering

Gonzalo García Núñez (16 February 1947 – 8 January 2024) was a Peruvian industrial engineer from the Peruvian National University of Engineering Lima (1968), a graduate of the French centre of economics programs (CEPE), and the holder of a Ph.D. in economics from Grenoble University. He was a professor, banker, entrepreneur, economist and politician. García Núñez was a full professor of macroeconomics and industrial organisation at the Peruvian University of Engineering, an elected General Secretary, President of the chapter of industrial and economics engineers, President of the Society of Professors of the University of Engineering, secretary and chairman of the faculty of systems engineers and President of the national engineer institution of Peru, the Colegio de Ingenieros del Perú. With the Izquierda Unida party in 1983, he was elected Councillor of Lima, reelected in 1986 and was a candidate for the upper house of the Congress in 1990, under the Izquierda Socialista, but he was unsuccessful. He was an opponent of former President Alberto Fujimori in the Foro Democrático NGO. He was elected Central Bank director by an absolute majority of the Peruvian Congress in 2001. A member of "Justice and Liberty", he was invited by Ollanta Humala, the candidate of the Peruvian Nationalist Party and he ran as Humala's first Vice President during the 2006 national election in the coalition between Union for Peru and the Peruvian Nationalist Party. The ticket won in the first round of voting with 30.6% of the total vote but lost in the second round (47.4%). García Núñez was responsible for the large government planning team on the ticket, and was editor of the plan named The Great Transformation, in honour of Karl Polanyi.

García was a member of the board of the Central Reserve Bank of Peru. In this period the inflation was 2 per cent on average between 2001 and 2006, the exchange rate was very stable and the international reserves growth at a high level in Peru's economic history. The board approved the inflation targeting rule in December 2001, proposed by experts of the bank, and ran the monetary policy with a very complex model of mathematical prevision and forecasts during the five years leading up to this time. He also served in the UN system and he was the author of the Vision of Peruvian Marginalized People and The Net of Production System of Villa El Salvador, a shanty town of Lima. Beginning in 1982 he wrote editorials for La República, one of Peru's greatest newspapers. In October 2006, invited by Humala and his allies for the 2006 local and regional election, Gonzalo García was a candidate only of Ollanta’s Peruvian Nationalist Party|Nationalist Party and was not elected mayor of Lima, losing to the then-incumbent Mayor Luis Castañeda.

García worked as a teacher in the Postgraduate section of UNI and a consultant for international scientific and technical cooperation organizations.

For the period 2011–2012, he was elected as President of the National Council of the Magistracy who was elected by universal, direct and secret vote of the professionals of Peru.

García died on 8 January 2024, at the age of 76.
