= Martha Chávez =

Peruvian politician

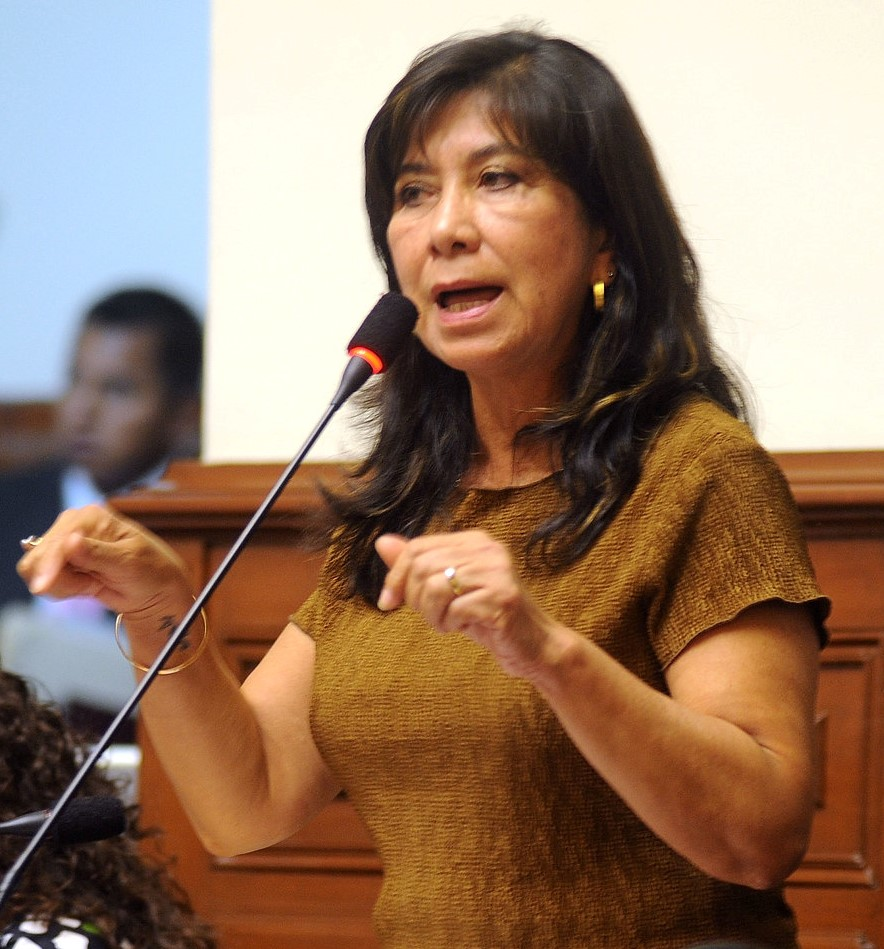
- Chávez in 2012

President of Congress
- In office 26 July 1995 – 26 July 1996
- Vice President: 1st Vice President; Víctor Joy Way; 2nd Vice President; Carlos Torres y Torres; 3rd Vice President; Samuel Matsuda Nishimura
- Preceded by: Jaime Yoshiyama (as President of the Democratic Constituent Congress)
- Succeeded by: Víctor Joy Way

Senator of the Republic
- Incumbent
- Assumed office 26 July 2026
- Constituency: National

Member of Congress
- In office 16 March 2020 – 28 July 2021
- Constituency: Lima
- In office 26 July 2011 – 26 July 2016
- Constituency: Lima
- In office 26 July 1995 – 26 July 2006
- Constituency: National (1995-2001); Lima (2001-2006)
- Constituency: National

Member of the Democratic Constituent Congress
- In office 26 November 1992 – 26 July 1995
- Constituency: National

Personal details
- Born: Martha Gladys Chávez Cossío; 12 January 1953 (age 73) Callao, Peru
- Party: Popular Force (2010-2015, 2019-present)
- Other political affiliations: Cambio 90 (non-affiliated); New Majority (1992-2012); Sí Cumple (2006); Alliance for the Future (2006–2010)
- Spouse: Javier Ocampo
- Children: 1

Martha Gladys Chávez Cossío de Ocampo (born 12 January 1953) is a Peruvian politician and lawyer currently serving as a Senator of Peru since 2026. A prominent figure of Fujimorism, she previously served in the unicameral Congress of Peru from 1995 to 2006, 2011 to 2016, and 2020 to 2021. In the 2006 elections, she was the presidential candidate for the Fujimorist Alliance for the Future ticket, placing fourth in the election.

== Education and professional career ==
From 1970 to 1976, Martha Chávez studied law at the Pontificia Universidad Católica del Perú. From 1986 to 1988 she studied additionally for a master's degree in international economic law. From 1984 to 1992, she worked as an associate lawyer for a Limean law firm. From 2006 to 2010 she lectured on a part-time base at the private University San Juan Bautista.

== Political career ==
=== Writing the Peruvian Constitution ===
After Alberto Fujimori's self-coup on April 5, 1992, Martha Chávez was elected as a member of the Democratic Constitutional Congress in 1992, which wrote a new constitution in aftermath of the 1992 Peruvian Constitutional Crisis. Chávez personally introduced the clauses of the Peruvian Constitution that allowed Fujimori to run for a second term and suggested that she might attempt to abolish all term limits on the presidency. Chávez was the first woman to be elected President of the Congress of Peru in 1995.

=== Congresswoman and party politics ===
Chávez was first elected to Congress in 1995. She was the first woman to be elected President of the Congress in 1995 for the 1995–1996 term. She was suspended from active duty as a congresswoman in June 2001 due to charges of corruption. From 1998 to 2004, she was secretary-general of the Fujimorist New Majority, and from 2004 to 2011 chairwoman of the Fujimorist New Majority party.

=== 2000 Presidential elections ===
During the 2000 elections in Peru, Chávez suggested that Fujimori would dissolve Congress if Peru 2000 did not win a majority of seats. She also said that she could not rule out a fourth election of Fujimori, despite the fact that the Constitution of Peru which was written in part by Chávez herself allows presidents to be elected no more than twice in a row. Indeed, Chávez had earlier promised that Fujimori would not run in the 2000 elections.

=== Presidential Candidate (2006) ===
In addition to Alliance for the Future, Chávez is also affiliated with Alberto Fujimori's Sí Cumple party.

While Chávez backed Fujimori's own bid for the presidency, she decided to run a separate campaign after the National Jury of Elections banned Fujimori's name from the ballot on 10 January 2006, citing a political and congressional ban on his participation in Peruvian politics until 2011. Her running mates in the election are Santiago Fujimori, a lawyer and Alberto Fujimori's brother and Rolando Sousa, also a lawyer, without political experience. She placed fourth in the election after receiving 7.4% of the vote and failed to qualify in the June run-off.

=== Post-2006 political career ===
Chávez remains a visible spokeswoman for the Alliance for the Future ticket and for Fujimorismo in general. After a band of Fujimori sympathizers held a guard at gunpoint and heavily damaged the "Ojo Que Llora" ("Crying Eye"), a memorial to the victims of Peru's Internal War that included the names of victims of government death squads that operated under Fujimori such as Grupo Colina, Chávez said that she applauded the attack, and called the memorial "a garbage monument".

=== Return to Congress ===
In the 2011 general election she was elected to the Congress on the Fuerza 2011 party, representing Lima for the 2011–2016 term. In July 2011, already back as Congresswoman, Chávez starred in an incident at the assumption of command of the then President Ollanta Humala, where he accused the President of not respecting the constitutional norms for swearing in the name of the Constitution of Peru of 1979 (not in force), with which the presidential oath became null.

A month later, with 72 votes in favor, 35 against and 10 abstentions, in the plenary session of the Peruvian parliament, the Humalist majority, approved the suspension for 120 days of Chávez for her behavior during the inauguration ceremony of former president Ollanta Humala. On December 1, 2011, she rejoined the Congress of the Republic after 120 days of suspension.

During this congressional period, Chávez chaired the Labor and Social Security Commission (2014-2015) and was secretary of the Justice Commission (2013-2014). In addition, he was a member of the National Defense and Internal Order, Constitution and Regulation, Justice and Human Rights commissions, the Subcommittee on Constitutional Accusations.

In this management, he is part of the Constitution and Regulation, Justice and Human Rights and Intelligence commissions. In the same way, it belongs to the Permanent Commission and to the Subcommittee of Constitutional Accusations; as well as the parliamentary leagues between Italy, Indonesia, Russia, China and Morocco.

In the 2020 snap parliamentary election, she returned to Congress after a brief 4-year absence on the Fuerza Popular list, representing Lima to complete the 2016–2021 term. She took office on 16 March 2020.

In September 2020, Chávez voted to declare the vacancy due to moral incapacity of former president Martín Vizcarra in the first unsuccessful vacancy process.

In November 2020, Chávez again voted in favor of the vacancy for moral incapacity of Martín Vizcarra in the second presidential vacancy process. The vacancy was approved by 105 parliamentarians on November 9, 2020.

In the vote on the resignation of Manuel Merino, Chávez was the only one who voted against since he considered that Merino should continue to be President.

== Controversies ==
=== "La Cantuta" Investigation ===
One of her most controversial actions as congresswoman happened while the La Cantuta massacre case was making headlines in Peru. During the investigations and legal procedures, it was revealed that at least 10 people were kidnapped and killed by the Peruvian military. Chávez responded by introducing a law that prohibited the judicial powers from calling low-level military officials to testify in court cases. The resolution passed after opposition lawmakers walked out of Congress in protest.

The case was dismissed on the pretext that because the location of the bodies of the murdered students and professors was unknown, the courts had no way of knowing if they ever actually existed. Chávez stated that the students must have staged their own kidnapping. Soon afterwards, a journalist was anonymously sent a map of the locations of the bodies. After the unmarked graves were uncovered in the site provided on the map, Chávez responded by suggesting that the journalist be jailed because, by uncovering the graves, he had tampered with a crime scene.

=== "Ley Colán" ===
Chávez introduced the controversial "Ley Colán" (Colán's Law) which mandates that in the event of a tie in the Democratic Constitutional Congress, seniority would be used to determine the winner. The Constitutional Democratic Congress had recently come to a tie as to whether or not the Attorney General, Blanca Nelida Colán, could serve a second term despite a constitutional provision that explicitly mandated that the position be filled by the Prosecutor's Board. Because those who voted for Colán to fill the position had the most seniority, Chávez's bill effectively handed Colán the position. (The Democratic Constitutional Congress was working on a new Constitution at that time, and the Constitution of 1979 had been suspended by Fujimori). Colán was later imprisoned for corruption.

=== Comments on the Inter-American Court of Human Rights ===
Chávez controversially characterized the judges on the Inter-American Court of Human Rights as leftist terrorist-sympathizers.
