= Javier Espinoza =

Peruvian politician

Javier Felipe Espinoza Ayaipoma is a Peruvian politician. He was Progresemos Perú's presidential candidate for the 2006 national election. He received 0.1% of the vote, coming in 16th place.
