= Jaime Salinas =

Peruvian politician

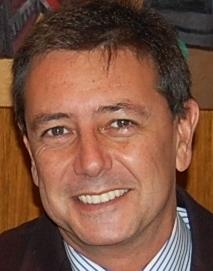
Jaime Salinas López-Torres

Jaime Salinas López-Torres (born March 8, 1963, in Lima, Peru) is a Peruvian politician, son of General Jaime Salinas Sedó. He was Justicia Nacional's presidential candidate for the 2006 national election. He received 0.535% of the vote, coming in 8th place.

He was arrested after his father's failed coup attempt on Alberto Fujimori's government in November 1992. He lived for three years in Argentina, where he worked toward his father's freedom, obtained in 1995, when he returned to Lima.

He ran unsuccessfully for Congress in 1995 and 2000, for Mayor of Miraflores in 1998 and for Mayor of Lima in 2002. He has directed a TV show called Justicia Para Todos ("Justice for All").
