= National Justice Party (Peru) =

National Justice Party Partido Justicia Nacional
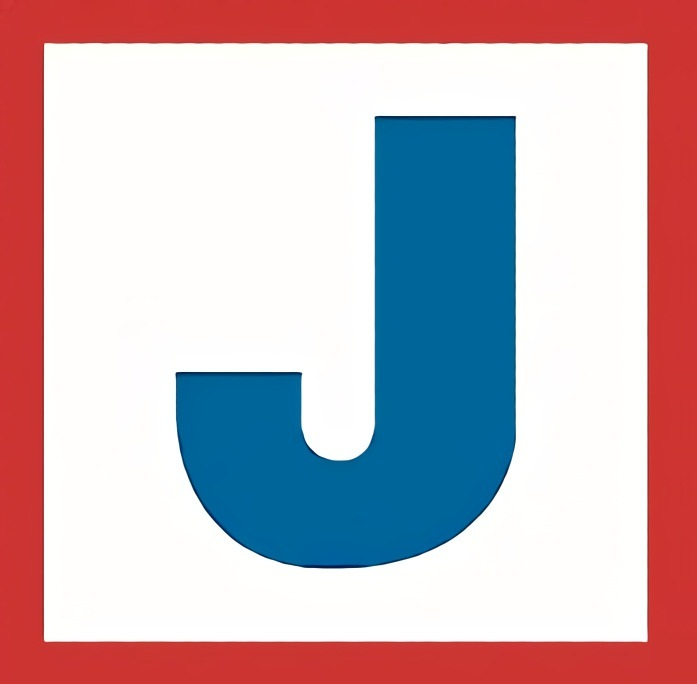
- Abbreviation: PJN
- Leader: Jaime Salinas
- Founded: 2004
- Dissolved: 2006
- Headquarters: Lima
- Ideology: Liberalism
- Political position: Centre

The National Justice Party (Spanish: Partido Justicia Nacional) was a Peruvian political party. At the legislative elections held on 9 April 2006, the party won 1.4% of the popular vote but no seats in the Congress of the Republic. The party subsequently lost its registration.

Currently, the party is not registered in the National Jury of Elections, therefore it is not officially considered a political party and cannot participate in any election. Therefore, the party is considered as defunct since 2007.
