= Avanza País (Peru, 2000) =

Political party in Peru

Avanza País – Social Integration Party Avanza País – Partido de Integración Social
- Abbreviation: AvP
- Founder: Pedro Cenas
- Founded: 10 April 2000
- Registered: 3 March 2003
- Dissolved: 27 August 2007
- Succeeded by: Avanza País (2017)
- Ideology: Social democracy; Social conservatism; Left-wing nationalism; Ultranationalism; Ethnocacerism
- Political position: Left-wing

Avanza País – Social Integration Party (Spanish: Avanza País – Partido de Integración Social; lit. 'Go on Country' or 'Country Advances') was a Peruvian political party. Founded in the northern city of Santiago de Chuco, La Libertad in 2000, the party nominated Ulises Humala, brother of future President Ollanta Humala, for the presidency in the 2006 general election, in the election, the party received 1.1% of the popular vote but no seats in the Congress of the Republic. The presidential ticket itself attained 0.2%, placing fourteenth nationally and subsequently lost its registration.

== History ==
In early 2005, the party registered in the National Elections Jury and participated in the 2006 general election, launching Ulises Humala as its presidential nominee. At the legislative elections held on 9 April 2006, the party won 1.1% of the popular vote but no seats in the Congress of the Republic. The presidential ticket itself attained 0.2%, placing fourteenth nationally.

After losing its formal registration as a political organization, the party began a re-founding stage on May 10, 2017, culminating in a new registration in the same year and was used by economist Hernando de Soto in order to run for the presidency at the 2021 general election.

== Ideology ==
Go on Country described itself as a syncretic party in support of social democracy and social conservatism upon its founding, while Infobae described it as ultranationalist in 2006. In their statutes they claimed to be a "second historical project" to promote "social integrationism" as an alternative to neoliberalism. Their founder Pedro Cenas claimed the party is center-left and socialist but also noted that they believe in market in contrast to "[their] colleagues who are further to the left." He also said that the party was founded for these who were left behind following the disintegration of the United Left. Go on Country claimed to follow the ideologies of Alfonso Barrantes and César Vallejo.

== Election results ==
=== President ===
Election	Candidate	Votes	%	Outcome
2006	Ulises Humala	24,518	0.20	14th

=== Congress ===
Election	Votes	%	Seats	+/–	Position
2006	122,653	1.1	0 / 120	Steady	Extra-parliamentary

=== Regional and municipal elections ===
Election	Regional governors	Provincial mayors	District mayors
Election	Outcome	Outcome	Outcome
2006	1 / 25	0 / 196	2 / 1,874
