= Lourdes Mendoza =

Peruvian businesswoman and politician (1958–2024)

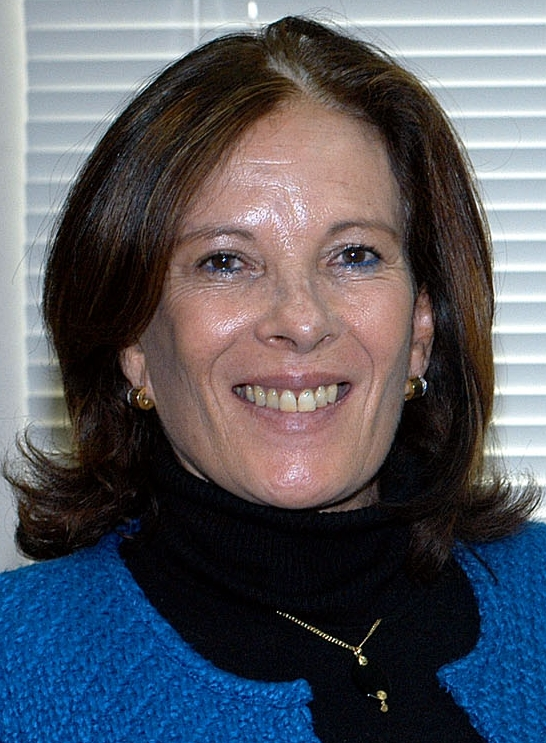
- Mendoza in 2010

Second Vice President of Peru
- In office 28 July 2006 – 28 July 2011
- President: Alan García Pérez
- Preceded by: David Waisman
- Succeeded by: Omar Chehade

Member of Congress
- In office 26 July 2006 – 26 July 2011
- Constituency: Arequipa

Arequipa City Councilwoman
- In office 1 January 2003 – 26 July 2006

Personal details
- Born: 7 January 1958 Arequipa, Peru
- Died: 4 October 2024 (aged 66)
- Party: Peruvian Aprista Party
- Spouse: Alfredo Fonts Fontana (divorced)

Zoila Lourdes Carmen Sandra Mendoza del Solar (7 January 1958 – 4 October 2024) was a Peruvian businesswoman and politician with the Peruvian Aprista Party. She was the first woman in Peru's history to become a Vice President of Peru, running as the Second Running mate of Alan García in the 2006 election.

Mendoza was also elected as Member of Congress representing Arequipa, where she had been elected as "regidora" in 2002. She served until the 2011 election when she lost her seat in the 2011 elections when she ran for re-election.

== Death ==
Mendoza died from a heart attack on 4 October 2024, at the age of 66.

== Electoral history ==
=== Executive ===
Electoral history of Victoria Villarruel
Election	Office	List	Votes			Result	Ref.
Election	Office	List	Total	%	P.	Result	Ref.
2006 1-R	Second Vice President of Peru	Peruvian Aprista Party	2,985,858	24.32%	2nd	→ Round 2	
2006 2-R	Second Vice President of Peru	Peruvian Aprista Party	6,965,017	52.63%	1st	Elected	

=== Legislative ===
Election	Office	List	#	District	Votes			Result	Ref.
Election	Office	List	#	District	Total	%	P.	Result	Ref.
2006	Member of Congress	Peruvian Aprista Party	1	Arequipa	20,019	13.61%	3rd (Note: Presented on an electoral list. The data shown represents the share of the vote the entire party/alliance received in that constituency.)	Elected	
2011	Member of Congress	Peruvian Aprista Party	2	Arequipa	6,693	4.28%	6th	Not elected	

=== Andean Parliament ===
Election	Office	List	#	Votes			Result	Ref.
Election	Office	List	#	Total	%	P.	Result	Ref.
2016	Member of the Andean Parliament	Popular Alliance	3	38,069	8.15%	4th (Note: Presented on an electoral list. The data shown represents the share of the vote the entire party/alliance received in that constituency.)	Not elected	

=== Provincial ===
Election	Office	List	#	Votes			Result	Ref.
Election	Office	List	#	Total	%	P.	Result	Ref.
2002	Arequipa Province Councilwoman	Peruvian Aprista Party	3	89,418	22.82%	1st (Note: Presented on an electoral list. The data shown represents the share of the vote the entire party/alliance received in that constituency.)	Elected	
