= Luis Guerrero (politician) =

Peruvian politician (born 1953)

Luis Guerrero Figueroa

Member of Congress
- In office 26 July 2001 – 26 July 2006
- Constituency: Cajamarca
- In office 26 July 2000 – 26 July 2001
- Constituency: National

Personal details
- Born: 20 August 1953 (age 73) Chota, Peru
- Party: Peru Now
- Other political affiliations: Possible Peru (2000-2005); We Are Peru (1999-2000)
- Education: Pontifical Catholic University of Peru; National University of San Marcos, Lima
- Occupation: politician, member of Peruvian Congress

Luis Bernardo Guerrero Figueroa (born 20 August 1953) is a Peruvian politician. He was a Member of Congress for two periods 2000–2001 and 2001–2006; and was Perú Ahora's presidential candidate for the 2006 national election. He was also Mayor of Cajamarca from 1993 to 1998 and President of the Association of Municipalities of Peru, from 1996 to 1999.
