= Alberto Moreno (politician) =

Peruvian politician

Alberto Moreno (born Gotardo Hernan Rojas del Río; 31 May 1941) is a left-wing Peruvian politician. He is the general secretary of the Communist Party of Peru – Red Fatherland and the president of the New Left Movement.

During the 1980s, police found an arms arsenal in the residence of Moreno. It was largely believed to have been planted there by agents of the state. Moreno was sentenced to 18 years' imprisonment, but after a second trial he was released on the grounds on insufficient evidence.

Moreno was a founding member of the Revolutionary Left Union (UNIR) and formed part of the leadership of the Izquierda Unida - United Left (IU).

Moreno was nominated as the presidential candidate of the Broad Left Front (FAI) for the 2006 elections. He received 0.3% of the vote, coming in 12th place.
