= Jaime Yoshiyama =

Peruvian politician

- ハイメ・ヨシヤマ

President of the Democratic Constituent Congress
- In office 20 December 1992 – 26 July 1995
- Vice President: 1st Vice President; Carlos Torres y Torres; 2nd Vice President; Rafael Rey; 3rd Vice President; Víctor Joy Way
- Preceded by: Felipe Osterling (as President of the Senate); Roberto Ramírez del Villar (as President of the Chamber of Deputies)
- Succeeded by: Martha Chávez (as President of the Congress of the Republic)

Minister of the Presidency
- In office 15 November 1995 – 13 September 1997
- President: Alberto Fujimori
- Preceded by: Manuel Vara Ochoa
- Succeeded by: Daniel Hokama

Member of the Democratic Constituent Congress
- In office 26 November 1992 – 26 July 1995
- Constituency: National

Personal details
- Born: Clemente Jaime Yoshiyama Tanaka; 23 July 1944 (age 82) Huancayo, Junín, Peru
- Party: Popular Force
- Other political affiliations: Cambio 90 – New Majority
- Education: Michigan State University

Clemente Jaime Yoshiyama Tanaka (Spanish pronunciation: [ˌkleˌmente ˌxaime ʝoʃiˌʝama taˈnaka]; born 23 July 1944) is a Peruvian politician. He was the President of the Democratic Constitutional Congress from December 1992 to July 1995. He was also the Minister of the Presidency during the administration of President Alberto Fujimori.

== Early life and education ==
Yoshiyama was born on 23 July 1944 in Huancayo, Junín to a family of Japanese Peruvians. He is graduated in Industrial Engineering. He attended ESAN University, a prestigious Peruvian postgraduate School, and graduated as a Valedictorian in 1967 getting an MBA degree. He earned scholarships to attend Michigan State University graduating with a Master in Business Administration in 1969, and Harvard University with a Master in Public Administration (Economics and Economic Development) 1976.

== Political career ==
In July 1990 he was President of the Board of Directors of Electrolima and then President of the Committee on Privatizacion of Public Enterprises (Comisión de Privatización de la empresas Públicas; abbreviated COPRI).

He was the founder of the Fujimorist alliance Cambio 90 – New Majority. He was the President of the Democratic Constitutional Congress from 1992 to 1995. He was also the Minister of Transport and Communications (January–October 1991), Minister of Energy and Mines (February–November 1992), and Minister of the Presidency (November 1995–September 1996), during the first and second term of Alberto Fujimori, respectively.

Born in Huancayo, Yoshiyama ran for Mayor of Lima in the 1995 Lima municipal elections but lost to opposition candidate Alberto Andrade of We Are Lima.

In the 2011 general elections, he ran for Second Vice President under the Force 2011 ticket of Fujimori's daughter Keiko but, the ticket narrowly lost to the ticket of Ollanta Humala of Peru Wins in the runoff.

== Conviction and sentence ==
On June 21, 2006, judicial proceedings were initiated against Yoshiyama and twelve other former ministers of Alberto Fujimori for their involvement in the 1992 self-coup. In December 2007, Yoshiyama was found guilty on a charge of rebellion but was only given a four-year suspended sentence as he was considered a secondary accomplice.

== Odebrecht case ==
Since November 11, 2018, he has had an international arrest warrant for allegedly having received illicit money from the Odebrecht company for the 2011 presidential campaign of Keiko Fujimori, who was also detained. On March 11, 2019, he surrendered to justice and was interned in the Castro Castro Prison, where there are people linked to Fuerza Popular.

== See also ==
- Alberto Fujimori
