= With Force Peru =

Political party in Peru

With Force Peru Con Fuerza Perú
- Leader: Pedro Koechlin Von Stein
- Founded: March 1995
- Dissolved: 2007
- Headquarters: Lima, Peru
- Ideology: Green politics
- Political position: Centre
- International affiliation: None

Website
- http://www.confuerzaperu.org/

With Force Peru (Spanish: Con Fuerza Perú) is a Peruvian political party founded in March 1995. The party participated in the 2006 Peruvian national election under the presidential candidacy of Pedro Koechlin Von Stein.

At the legislative elections held on 9 April 2006, the party won less than 1% of the popular vote and no seats in the Congress of the Republic. The party subsequently lost its registration.
