= New Left Movement (Peru) =

Political party in Peru

New Left Movement Movimiento Nueva Izquierda
- Leader: Alberto Moreno
- Founded: 1994
- Dissolved: 2012
- Ideology: Socialism; Left-wing populism Patriotism
- Political position: Left-wing

The New Left Movement (Spanish: Movimiento Nueva Izquierda) is a Peruvian political party. At the legislative elections held on 9 April 2006, the party won 1.2% of the popular vote but no seats in the Congress of the Republic. The party ran Alberto Moreno for the presidency in 2006 gaining 0.3% of the popular vote.
