= Sí Cumple =

- Abbreviation: SC
- Leader: Carlos César Zuñiga Morishigue
- Founder: Alberto Fujimori
- Founded: 1997 (as VV); 2005 (as SC)
- Dissolved: 30 July 2012 (as SC)
- Headquarters: Lima
- Ideology: Fujimorism
- Political position: Right-wing
- National affiliation: Peru 2000 (1999–2001); Alliance for the Future (2005–2006)
- International affiliation: None

Party flag

Sí Cumple (approximate translation: "Keep Promises" or "He Delivers"), until 2005 called Let's Go Neighbor (Spanish: Vamos Vecino, VV), was a political party of Peru founded by Alberto Fujimori in 1997 in order for the party to participate in that year's municipal elections. Following the establishment of Popular Force in 2009 by Fujimori's daughter Keiko, Sí Cumple ceased to exist in 2012, as their registration was cancelled by the National Jury of Elections for not participating in the 2011 general election. Most of its members ran for office with Popular Force, and ultimately switched their affiliations.

Its primary founder is Alberto Fujimori. Among its leaders were Absalón Vasquez and its Secretary General, Carlos Orellana Quintanilla.

== History ==
=== 2000 and 2001 elections ===
For the 2000 general election, the party joined up with Cambio 90 and New Majority to form the alliance Peru 2000 to support the presidential candidacy of Alberto Fujimori who is running for a third term amid public discontent. During the elections, Chávez suggested that Fujimori would dissolve Congress if Peru 2000 did not win a majority of seats. She also said that she could not rule out a fourth election of Fujimori, despite the fact that the Constitution of Peru which was written in part by Chávez herself allows presidents to be elected no more than twice in a row. Indeed, Chávez had earlier promised that Fujimori would not run in the 2000 elections. In this same year, due to internal conflicts and Fujimori's resignation, the alliance broke off. In 2001, it participated in the general elections as part of the Solución Popular alliance with Con Fuerza Perú. It participated only in municipal and regional elections in 2002.

=== 2006 elections ===
In 2005, the organization changed its name from Vamos Vecino to "Sí Cumple" and formed the "Alianza Sí Cumple" (Sí Cumple Alliance), again with Cambio 90 and New Majority. However, the Jurado Nacional de Elecciones (National Jury of Elections) did not accept this change, and the alliance was dissolved.

Afterwards, Cambio 90, New Majority, and Siempre Unidos formed the Alliance for the Future coalition, but Sí Cumple maintained its independence. In the second week of December 2005, at the National Congress of Sí Cumple, as well as that of the Alianza por el Futuro, Fujimori was selected as the presidential candidate for the 2006 general elections. They also selected Luisa María Cuculiza for First Vice President, and Germán Kruger for Second Vice President. However, Fujimori was barred from running for president on 10 January 2006 as he is currently undergoing trial in Peru. Among the numerous charges, he's accused for the Barrios Altos and La Cantuta massacres. Cuculiza instead ran for Congress as a guest candidate of the Alliance for the Future and was elected.

== Last years and dissolution ==
In 2006, the National Congress of Sí Cumple decided to participate in the regional and municipal elections that were held on November 19, taking Carmen Lozada (former congresswoman) as a candidate to run for mayor of Lima, receiving only 3.51% of the total number of valid votes. Likewise, in the districts, provincial mayoralties and regional governments in the interior of the country, only one town hall was obtained in Cerro de Pasco.

In 2007, the National Elections Jury cancelled the party's registration in the Political Organization Registry. Notwithstanding Law 29092 promulgated by the Congress of the Republic of Peru, it restores its registration.

According to the official party statutes, the mandate of all leaders and all members of the National Executive Council expired in 2009 A large part of the militants and members resigned from the party to form Fuerza 2011 in order to support the candidacy of Keiko Fujimori. The departure of these leaders leaves the party without a leadership. reason why it is reconstituted, regrouping new bases to elect a new CEN.

In 2010, once the party was fully reconstituted, in a National Congress, the author of the party's political doctrine based on security, truth and dignity was elected as general representative of the party and candidate for the presidency of the Republic, Mr. Carlos César Zuñiga Morishigue. Professors Rafael Acosta and Gladys Espinoza were also elected as first and second vice-presidents respectively. It is important to mention that the presidential formula achieved notorious, but modest percentages of voting intention in the interior of the country without having campaigned. However, in January 2011, by consensus of the rank and file and in the full exercise of constitutional rights, the nomination was abandoned at that time, due to economic reasons, and in February of the same year support for the Force 2011 party was endorsed. with a view to the elections. The support relationship is completely fractured by discrepancies between the leaders, after the elections.

In July 2012, the Registry of Political Organizations of the National Elections Jury canceled the party's registration, arguing that "it was canceled for not participating in the last general elections, in accordance with Resolutions 323-2011, 324-2011, 368-2011 and 369-2011, issued by the JNE during the Regional and Municipal Elections of 2010".

== Electoral history ==
=== Presidential elections ===
Year	Candidate	Party / Coalition	Votes	Percentage	Outcome
2000	Alberto Fujimori	Peru 2000 C90-NM-SU-SC	1st Round: 5 528 568	1st Round: 49.87	1st Round: 1st
2000	Alberto Fujimori	Peru 2000 C90-NM-SU-SC	2nd Round: 6 041 685	2nd Round: 74.33	2nd Round: 1st
2001	Carlos Boloña	People's Solution SC-CFP	179 243	1.69	5th
2006	Martha Chávez	Alliance for the Future C90-NM-SC	912 740	7.43	4th
2011	Carlos César Zuñiga Morishigue	Sí Cumple	Ticket withdrawn	N/A	N/A

=== Elections to the Congress of the Republic ===
Year	Votes	%	Number of seats	▲/▼	Position
2000	4 189 018 as part of Peru 2000	42.2%	52 / 120	▲4	Minority
2001	336 689 as part of People's Solution	3.6%	1 / 120	▼3	Minority
2006	1 408 055 as part of Alliance for the Future	13.1%	13 / 120	▲1	Minority
