= Peru Now =

Political party in Peru

The Peru Now (Spanish: Perú Ahora) is a minor Peruvian political party. At the legislative elections held on 9 April 2006, the party won less than 1% of the popular vote and no seats in the Congress of the Republic.
