= 1992 Peruvian Democratic Constituent Congress election =

Elections for the Democratic Constituent Congress were held in Peru on 22 November 1992, following a self-coup (known as the "autogolpe") by President Alberto Fujimori on 5 April. The elections were boycotted by the American Popular Revolutionary Alliance, the second largest party in the Chamber of Deputies, and were won by Fujimori's Cambio 90 – New Majority alliance, which took 44 of the 80 seats.

The Congress drew up a new constitution, which was promulgated in 1993 after being approved in a referendum. The new constitution allowed for presidents to be re-elected, as well as making the Congress a unicameral legislature.

== Results ==
Party	Votes	%	Seats
Cambio 90 – New Majority	3,075,422	49.30	44
Christian People's Party	606,651	9.73	8
Independent Moralizing Front	486,984	7.81	7
Renewal Movement	440,314	7.06	6
Democratic Left Movement	341,646	5.48	4
Democratic Coordinator	328,153	5.26	4
National Front of Workers and Peasants	237,977	3.82	3
Agricultural People's Front of Peru	172,923	2.77	2
Solidarity and Democracy	126,822	2.03	1
Independent Agrarian Movement	107,543	1.72	1
New Peru Independent Movement	49,998	0.80	0
Democratic Emerging Front – Police Withdrawals	42,041	0.67	0
National Independent Movement	41,921	0.67	0
Civil–Military–Police Front	41,900	0.67	0
National Convergence	41,206	0.66	0
Peace and Development Independent Movement	36,596	0.59	0
Independent Social Action Movement	36,073	0.58	0
Socialist Party of Peru	23,512	0.38	0
Total	6,237,682	100.00	80
Valid votes	6,237,682	76.15	
Invalid/blank votes	1,954,164	23.85	
Total votes	8,191,846	100.00	
Registered voters/turnout	11,339,756	72.24	
Source: JNE, PDBA
