= Alliance for the Future (Peru) =

Peruvian political alliance

Alliance for the Future Alianza por el Futuro
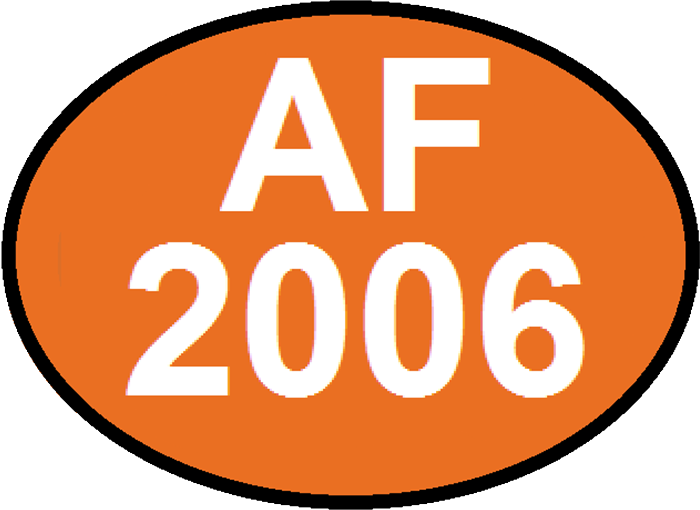
- Abbreviation: AF
- Leader: Martha Chávez
- President: Keiko Fujimori (de facto)
- Founded: 6 January 2006
- Dissolved: 2 August 2006
- Preceded by: Cambio 90 – New Majority
- Succeeded by: Popular Force
- Headquarters: Lima
- Ideology: Fujimorism
- Political position: Right-wing
- Members: Cambio 90; New Majority; Sí Cumple

Website
- https://www.fujimoristas.com/

Alliance for the Future (Spanish: Alianza por el Futuro, AF) was a Peruvian electoral alliance formed by pro-Fujimori parties Cambio 90, New Majority Siempre Unidos and Sí Cumple for the 2006 general election. Its presidential candidate was former President of the Congress and Congresswoman Martha Chávez Cossio.

== 2006 general election and composition and history ==
The alliance was apparently initially registered in case former President Alberto Fujimori's own ticket (under the party Sí Cumple) is rejected. Fujimori's bid for president was eventually rejected due to his ban by Congress to hold office until 2011, and this coalition became the only pro-Fujimori option in the election after the National Jury of Elections (Jurado Nacional de Elecciones) upheld the ban.

The candidates were:

- For President: Martha Chávez Cossio
- For First Vice-President: Santiago Fujimori Inomoto
- For Second Vice-President: Rolando Sousa Huanambal

Chávez is currently a Congresswoman (1995-2006), and was the first woman in Peruvian history to become President of the Congress (1995–96). She was suspended from Congress in 2002 after corruption accusations, but was reinstated in 2005 after she was acquitted in court. Santiago Fujimori is Alberto's younger brother and advisor during his presidency. Rolando Sousa is a lawyer and has not had a prominent role in politics before.

The vice-presidential candidates also ran for Congress under the candidate numbers of 4 and 3, respectively, in the Alliance's list for Lima. This list also included Keiko Fujimori, Alberto's daughter and former First Lady (after her parents' separation), as candidate number 1, who obtained the highest number of votes for an individual candidate. Another member of the party is Alejandro Aguinaga, Alberto Fujimori's personal doctor and former Health Minister and Renzo Reggiardo, the son of former Congressman Andres Reggiardo.

The Alliance's logo consists of an orange oval with the "AF 2006" in white. "AF" serves as both the initials of the coalition and those of Alberto Fujimori.

At the legislative elections held on 9 April 2006, the party won 13.1% of the popular vote and 13 seats out of 120 in the Congress of the Republic. On the same day, presidential nominee Martha Chávez won 7.4% of the popular vote, placing fourth in the election and failed to qualify for the June run-off.

== Dissolution ==
=== Fujimorist Parliamentary Group ===
After the 2006 elections, all of the 13 representatives elected on the Alliance for the Future lists has formed the Fujimorist Parliamentary Group (Spanish: Grupo Parlamentario Fujimorista) in Congress. Keiko's role as a congresswoman was moderate since she maintained a dialogue with APRA. In other words, it was a support for the government of the day in various legislative processes. In subsequent years, her role was discreet as she had periods of leave due to her double maternity leave, trips abroad due to representative obligations and to complete her studies abroad. During her presence at the congress, she was head of the commissions for Women and Social Development, Economy, Banking, Finance and Financial Intelligence, Foreign Trade and Tourism, Budget and General Account of the Republic, and Housing and Construction.

In July 2008, the Fujimorist bloc helped APRA Congressman Javier Velásquez Quesquén's candidacy for the presidency of the congress. Consequently, the opposition group indicated that this was due to the flexibilities that former president Fujimori received in jail. That same year, Keiko declared her intention to unite all Fujimorists into a single party.

=== 2011 elections ===
For the 2011 elections, the Alliance for the Future was succeeded as the Fujimorists' electoral vehicle by Force 2011 led by Alberto Fujimori's daughter, Keiko. Only a minority of Cambio 90 members decided to join the National Solidarity Alliance of former Lima Mayor Luis Castañeda.

== Electoral history ==
=== Presidential election ===
Year	Candidate	Coalition	Votes	Percentage	Outcome
2006	Martha Chávez	Alliance for the Future C90-NM-SC	912 740	7.43	4th

=== Election to the Congress of the Republic ===
Year	Leader	Votes	%	Number of seats	▲/▼	Position
2006	Martha Chávez	1 408 055	13.1%	13 / 120	▲10	Minority
