= Democratic Constituent Congress =

Democratic Constituent Congress Congreso Constituyente Democrático
- Republic of Peru

Type
- Type: Unicameral

History
- Established: 20 December 1992
- Disbanded: 26 July 1995
- Preceded by: Congress of the Republic of Peru
- Succeeded by: Congress of the Republic of Peru

Leadership
- President of the Democratic Constituent Congress: Jaime Yoshiyama, Cambio 90-New Majority
- Seats: 80

Meeting place
- Legislative Palace (Peru)

The Democratic Constituent Congress (Spanish: Congreso Constituyente Democrático) was a Constituent Assembly created in Peru after the dissolution of Congress by President Alberto Fujimori in 1992. Its main purpose was to amend the Constitution of 1979.

== President ==
- Jaime Yoshiyama (Cambio 90-New Majority)

== Constitutional Commission ==
=== President ===
- Carlos Torres y Torres Lara

=== Vice president ===
- Enrique Chirinos Soto

=== Members of the Commission ===
- José Barba Caballero
- Martha Chávez Cossío
- Carlos Ferrero Costa
- Víctor Joy Way Rojas
- Samuel Matsuda Nishimura
- Henry Pease García
- Roger Cáceres Velásquez
- César Fernández Arce
- Lourdes Flores Nano
- Ricardo Marcenaro Frers
- Fernando Olivera Vega
- Pedro Vilchez Malpica
