= Lourdes Flores =

Peruvian lawyer and politician

Lourdes Flores Nano
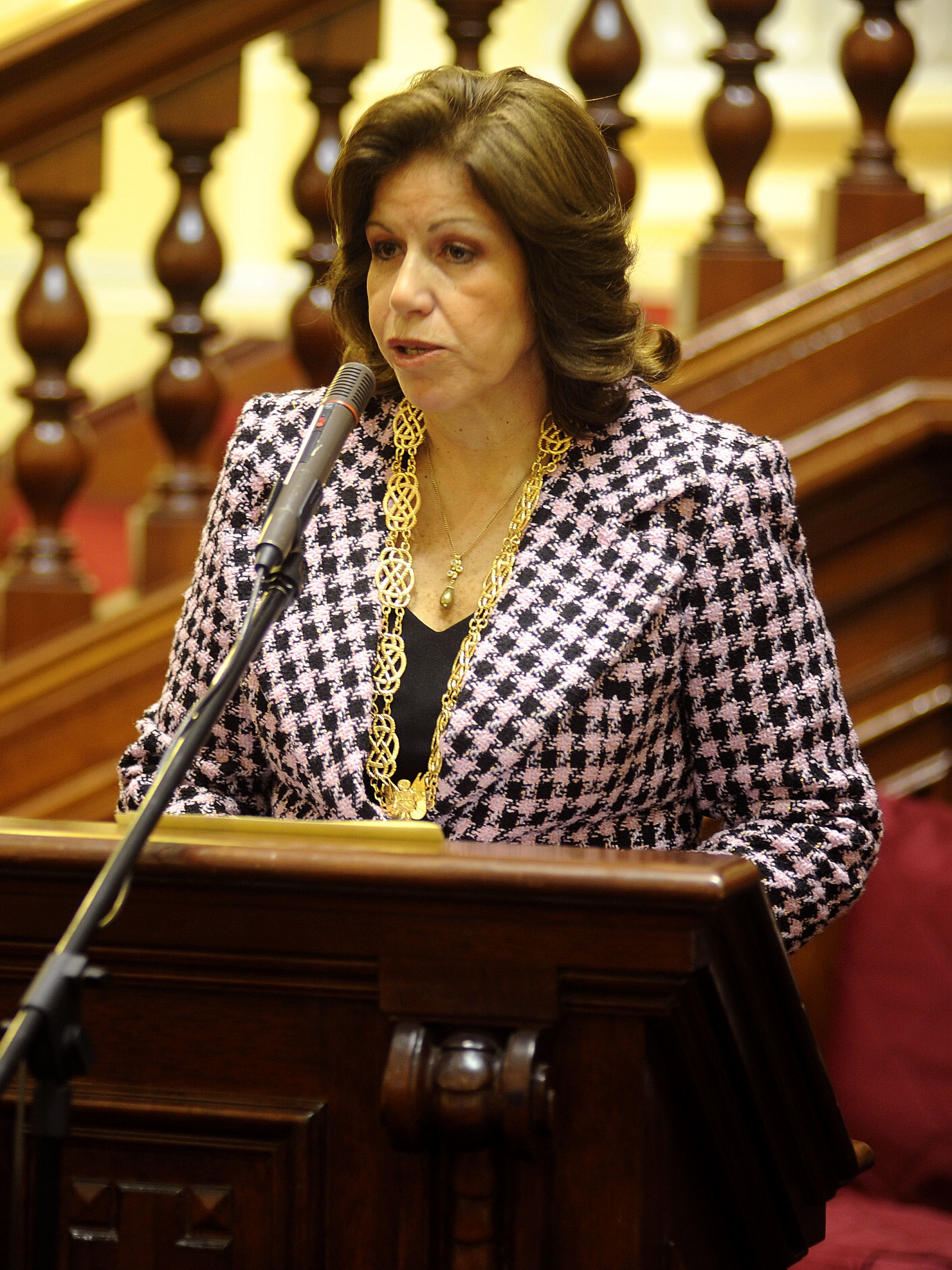

Member of Congress
- In office July 26, 1995 – July 26, 2000
- Constituency: National

Member of the Democratic Constituent Congress
- In office November 26, 1992 – July 26, 1995
- Constituency: National

Member of the Chamber of Deputies
- In office July 28, 1990 – April 5, 1992
- Constituency: Lima

President of the Christian People's Party
- In office 18 December 2003 – 18 December 2011
- Preceded by: Ántero Flores Aráoz
- Succeeded by: Raúl Castro Stagnaro

Personal details
- Born: 7 October 1959 (age 67) Lima, Peru
- Party: Christian People's Party; National Unity
- Education: Pontifical Catholic University of Peru (LLB); IE Business School (MA); Complutense University of Madrid (PhD)
- Profession: Lawyer

Lourdes Celmira Rosario Flores Nano (born October 7, 1959) is a Peruvian lawyer and politician who served as a councilwoman of Lima, Deputy from Lima from 1990 to 1992, Democratic Constituent Congresswoman from 1992 to 1995, Congresswoman from 1995 to 2000. She was the Christian People's Party candidate for President of Peru in the 2001 and 2006 elections in which she ran under the National Unity coalition.

Born in Jesús María, Lima, Flores graduated from the Pontifical Catholic University of Peru in 1983, obtaining a law degree. After working as a legal advisor in the Ministry of Justice, Flores began her professional activity independently. She was a professor of law and taught at the Pontifical Catholic University of Peru Law School and the University of Lima Law School between 1984 and 1989.

Starting her political career at a young age as a member of the Christian People's Party (Partido Popular Cristiano), Flores would occupy the internal positions of national secretary of Electoral Affairs (1984–88), national secretary of Professionals (1987–89), national secretary of Politics (1989–92) and of General Collegiate secretary (1992–99), before being elected as chairwoman of the Christian People's Party in 2003 and re-elected in 2007. She was the first woman to become chairwoman of a political party in Peru.

After a failed first candidacy to the Congress of the Republic at the age of 25, Flores was elected as a councilwoman of Lima in 1986 and re-elected in 1989, after aspiring to the office of Lieutenant Mayor of Lima. She became Deputy of the Republic in 1990, representing Lima. With Alberto Fujimori's self-coup and the dissolution of the 1992 Parliament, Flores was elected member of the Democratic Constituent Congress in 1992 and re-elected as a Congresswoman in 1995, becoming a leader of the parliamentary opposition to the Fujimori administration. After the fall of the regime, Flores decided to run for President in 2001, finishing in third place with 24% of the national vote in the first round, behind Alejandro Toledo and Alan García. Flores undertook a second run for the presidency in 2006, again occupying the third place in the voting results after being overtaken by Alan García, who went to a run-off with Ollanta Humala. Flores is the first woman to be a major contender for the presidency in the history of Peru.

Following her second presidential run, she assumed the position of chancellor of the San Ignacio de Loyola University from 2006 to 2009. She was a candidate for the mayor of Lima in the municipal elections of Lima in 2010. She obtained the second place, being surpassed by her leftist rival, Susana Villarán, by a narrow margin. In 2016, she ran for the First Vice Presidency on the Popular Alliance ticket, a heavily-criticized coalition between the Peruvian Aprista Party and the Christian People's Party for the presidential election of that year, receiving 5.83% of the voting and placing fifth.

Flores currently serves as the vice president of the Centrist Democrat International, a Christian democratic political international, and as a member of Washington D.C.–based think tank, the Inter-American Dialogue.

== Early life and education ==
Lourdes Flores was born in Lima on 7 October 1959. She studied at the Colegio ReIna de Los Ángeles and at the Pontificia Universidad Católica del Perú Law School. She pursued graduate studies in Madrid, earning a master in legal advice at Instituto de Empresa (currently known as IE Business School) and a doctorate in law at the Universidad Complutense. As an independent lawyer, Flores specialized in civil and business law. In 1992, Flores attended the World Economic Forum in Davos, Switzerland. She later taught commercial law at the Pontificia Universidad Católica del Perú and the University of Lima. She served for two years as chancellor of the Universidad San Ignacio de Loyola.

== Political career ==
=== Early political career ===
At age 18, Flores joined the Christian People's Party (PPC), a center-right branch of the Christian Democracy movement founded in 1966. She was an assistant to Enrique Elías Larosa, who became Minister of Justice.

Flores was elected Deputy from Lima to the Congress of the Republic in 1990 with more than 250,000 votes. During that election, the PPC formed part of the FREDEMO front backing Mario Vargas Llosa for president.

She opposed the 1992 "self-coup" of President Alberto Fujimori, organizing congressional meetings in her home. She was elected to the Democratic Constitutional Congress later that year and re-elected to Congress in 1995.

She denounced Fujimori's holding of Japanese citizenship in 1997 and opposed the activities of his security chief, Vladimiro Montesinos.

=== 2001 presidential campaign ===
In the year 2000, Flores founded the National Unity coalition, with a center-right tendency, in order to create a single front to run for the Peruvian presidency in the 2001 general election.

Facing sexism and misogyny, she led the opinion polls for several weeks, but got the third place with 24.3% of the votes, being overtaken by Alejandro Toledo and Alan García, who would face each other in a second round in which Toledo would win. The unfortunate comment of his father, César Flores, referring to Alejandro Toledo a few weeks after the first round, would be detrimental to the candidacy of Lourdes Flores, according to analysts, as being considered pejorative and discriminatory.

Despite the loss, National Unity consolidated itself as the third opposition force of the Toledo administration, winning 17 seats out of a total of 120. During the Toledo administration, both she and her coalition remained in the opposition, although supporting some the government's economic measures. National Unity was the first political group to withdraw from the National Accord in 2002, being widely criticized. Her party even supported a possible measure of vacancy of the President and Ántero Flores Aráoz obtained the presidency of Congress in 2004 thanks to the votes of the Peruvian Aprista Party.

In that year, Lourdes Flores rejected the April 14 strike called by the General Confederation of Workers of Peru, which had the support of APRA leader Alan García.

=== 2006 presidential campaign ===
Lourdes Flores ran again as the National Unity nominee for President in the 2006 race, which took place on April 9, 2006. At the end of 2005, Congressman José Barba withdrew his Radical Change party, having discovered a fraud of false signatures by a provincial committee. Immediately, Barba made it official that his party would be removed from the National Elections Board and would withdraw from the National Unity alliance.

In 2005, when she made her candidacy official, she already obtained the first place in the polls. In August 2005, Ollanta Humala began an unexpected rise in the polls. The polls throughout the campaign projected her as the most likely successor to Alejandro Toledo.

As of February 2006, Flores Nano began an advertising campaign with the slogan "Peru in firm hands". Güido Lombardi, a prominent journalist and television political host, provided the voiceover for their advertisements. Her coalition, National Unity, was the only one who did not advertise with his candidates for Congress, since they only presented the presidential candidate.

She was disqualified by her opponents, referring to Flores as the "candidate of the rich and the wealthy", a phrase coined by Alan García and his supporters against her, while members of the National Unity denounced a dirty war orchestrated by the Aprista Party and by Unión for Peru to damage directly to Lourdes Flores. The surveys of April 2006 showed an increase in Ollanta Humala, a decrease in Flores Nano and a slight increase in Alan García, which could be said to be a "technical draw".

At 100% of the computed votes, it was announced that Ollanta Humala and Alan García would contest the presidency in a run-off, obtaining 30.6% and 24.3% respectively. Lourdes Flores took the third place with 23.8% of the votes, around 65,000 fewer votes than García. As in 2001, former President Garcia edged her out by a slim margin (0.5%) for the second run-off spot. Garcia was then elected as President.

Recognizing the results that left her out of the race, Lourdes Flores affirmed that she believed she had lost "at the table", suggesting possible fraud in counting the votes at the polling tables.

=== 2010 Lima municipal election campaign ===
In 2010, Flores narrowly lost the election for Mayor of Lima to Susana Villarán of the Decentralist Social Force Party (Partido Descentralista Fuerza Social).
