= 2006 Peruvian general election =

- Presidential election
- 9 April 2006 (first round); 4 June 2006 (second round)
- Opinion polls
- Turnout: 88.71% (first round) ▲6.39pp 87.71% (second round) ▲6.30pp
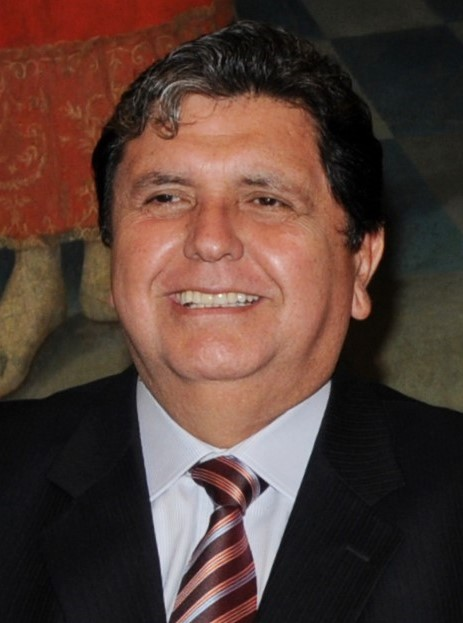

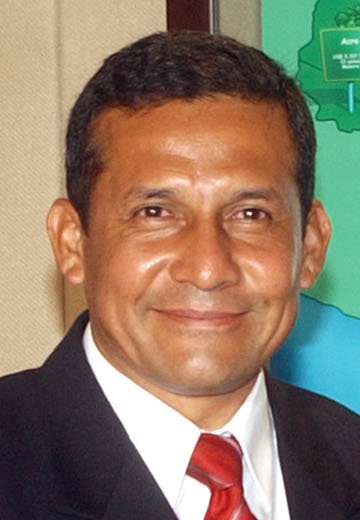
| Nominee | Alan García | Ollanta Humala |
| Party | APRA | UPP |
| Running mate | Luis Giampietri; Lourdes Mendoza | Gonzalo García Núñez; Carlos Torres Caro |
| Popular vote | 6,965,017 | 6,270,080 |
| Percentage | 52.63% | 47.37% |
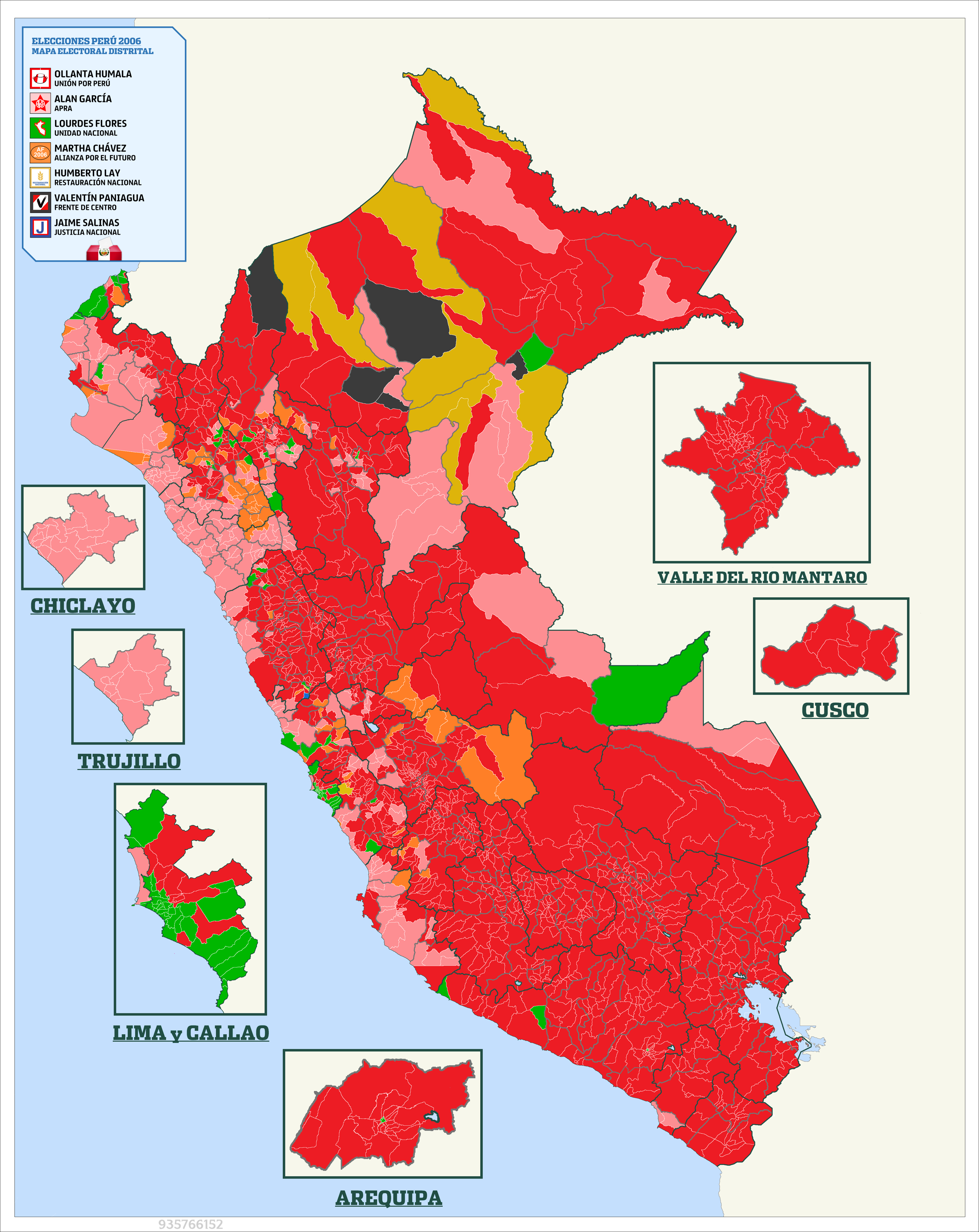
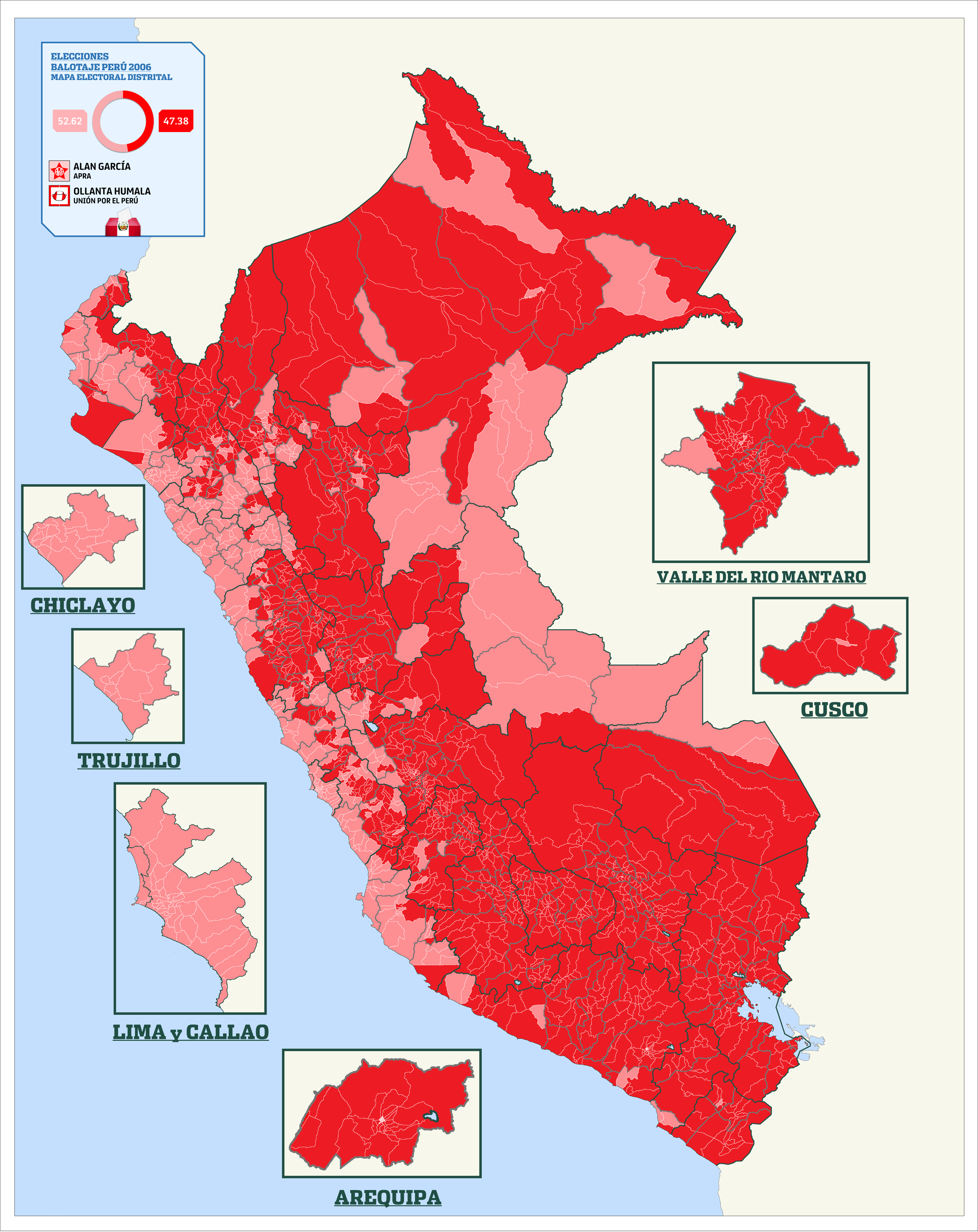
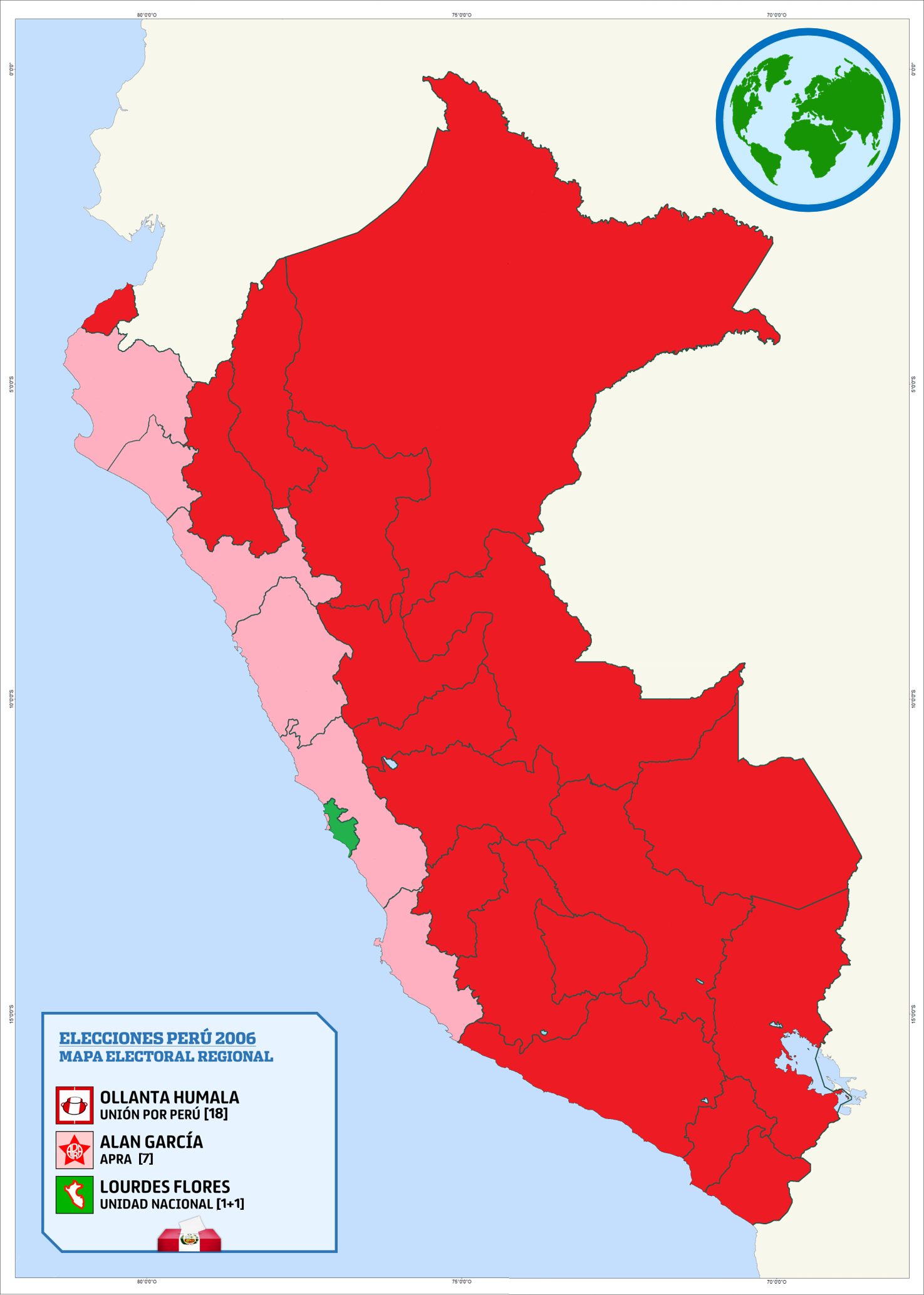
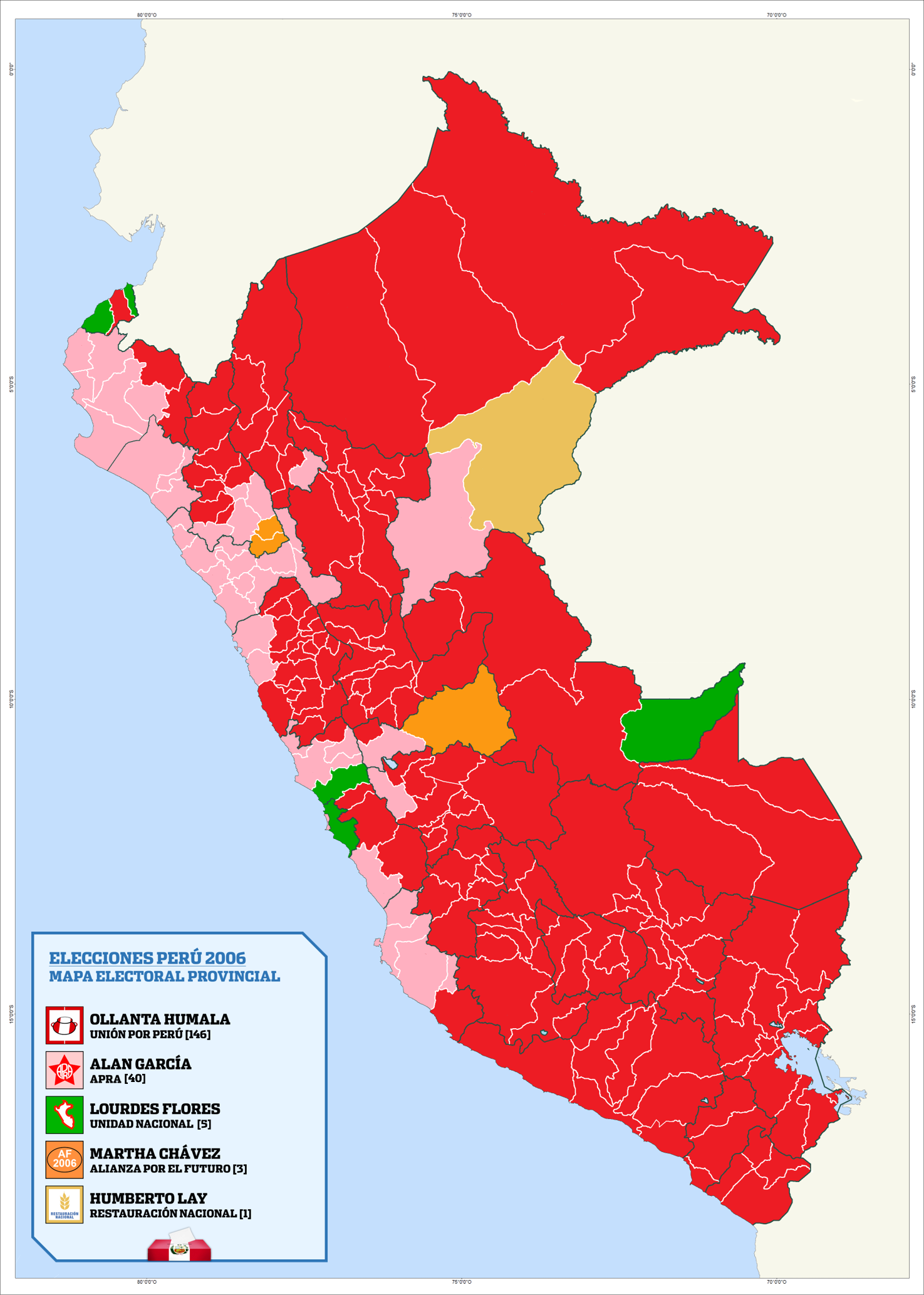
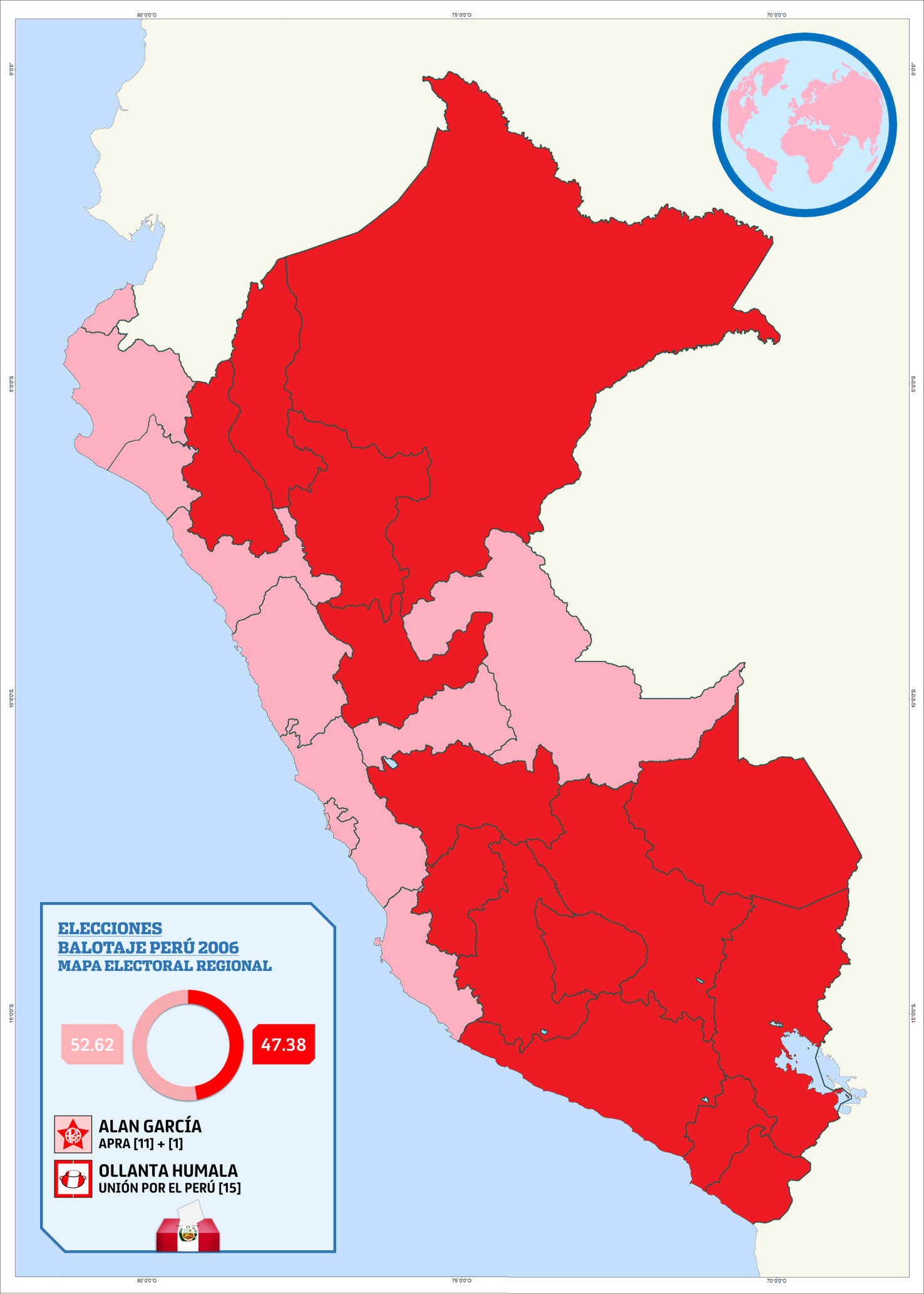
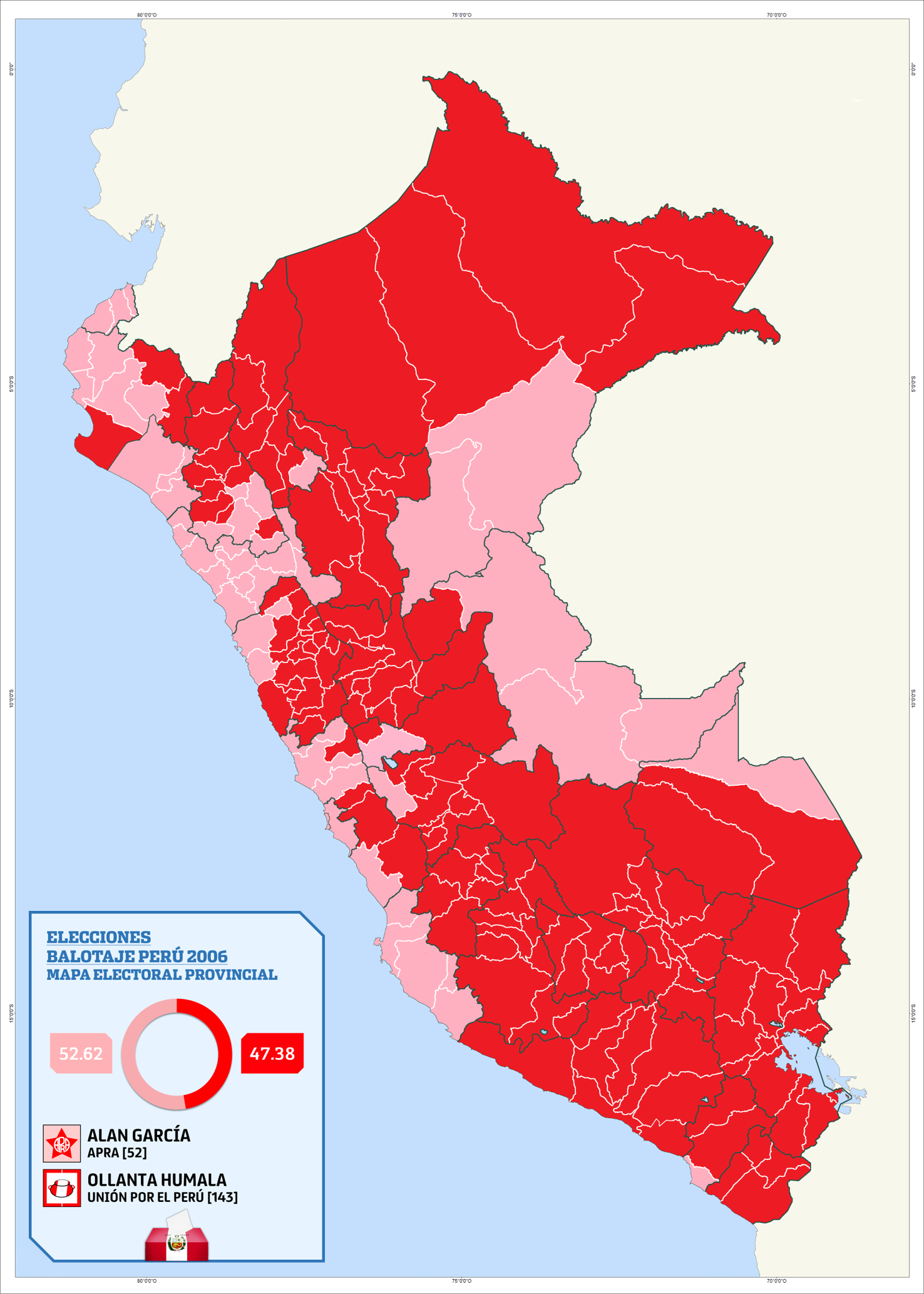
President before election
Alejandro Toledo
Possible Peru
Elected President
Alan García
APRA
- Congressional election
- 9 April 2006
- All 120 seats in Congress; 61 seats needed for a majority
| Party | Leader | Vote % | Seats | +/– |
|---|---|---|---|---|
| Union for Peru | Ollanta Humala | 21.15 | 45 | +39 |
| APRA | Alan García | 20.59 | 36 | +8 |
| National Unity | Lourdes Flores | 15.33 | 17 | 0 |
| AF2006 | Martha Chávez | 13.09 | 13 | +10 |
| Center Front | Valentín Paniagua | 7.07 | 5 | +1 |
| Possible Peru | Alejandro Toledo | 4.11 | 2 | −43 |
| RN | Humberto Lay Sun | 4.02 | 2 | New |
This lists parties that won seats. See the complete results below.
Results by department

General elections were held in Peru in on 9 April 2006 to elect the President, two Vice-Presidents, 120 members of Congress and five members of the Andean Parliament for the 2006–2011 period. As no presidential candidate received a majority of the vote, a second round was held on 4 June between the top two candidates, Ollanta Humala and Alan García. Garcia won the run-off with 52.63% to Humala's 47.37%. He was subsequently inaugurated on 28 July 2006, Peruvian Independence Day.

== Electoral system ==
The 120 members of Congress were elected from 25 constituencies based on the 24 departments and the Constitutional Province of Callao. The number of seats in Congress for each district was determined by its number of eligible voters. A political party need to win a minimum of five seats in two electoral districts or 4% of nationwide valid votes in order to be represented in Congress.

A minimum of 4% of nationwide valid votes was necessary for a party to win seats in the Andean Parliament.

== Candidates ==
=== Main presidential candidates ===
Presidential tickets
| Peruvian Aprista Party | Union for Peru | National Unity | Alliance for the Future | Centre Front | National Restoration |
| Alan García | Ollanta Humala | Lourdes Flores | Martha Chávez | Valentín Paniagua | Humberto Lay |
| President of Peru (1985–1990) | | Member of Congress (1995-2000) | Member of Congress (1995-2006) | President of Peru (2000-2001) | |

- Alan García is the leader of left-leaning Peruvian Aprista Party and was President of Peru from 1985 to 1990. His presidency was marked by hyperinflation and an economic crisis, as well as widespread terrorist activities and isolation from the international community; however, he came in second place in the 2001 presidential election, losing in the runoff against Alejandro Toledo. Critics often pointed to his administration as a failure to be repeated if he got elected.
- Ollanta Humala is the leader of the left-wing Peruvian Nationalist Party, but ran under the Union for Peru banner. He is a Lieutenant Colonel (retired) and led an uprising in October 2000 against then President Alberto Fujimori, for which he was pardoned by Congress following Fujimori's fall in November. He spoke of the "refoundation" of the country in a "Second Republic" and called for the rewriting of the Constitution by a Constituent Assembly. Opponents criticized his lack of political experience, his perceived authoritarianism and populism. He was constantly associated during the campaign with his brothers Ulises and Antauro, though their etnocacerista movement is more radical than his nationalist movement. Ulises also ran for President in this election with Avanza País; Antauro, who participated in the 2000 insurrection, is in prison, following his own brief rebellion in January 2005 against President Alejandro Toledo, but also ran for Congress under the Avanza País.
- Lourdes Flores is the leader of the conservative, right-wing National Unity coalition. She is a former Congresswoman and came in third place in the 2001 presidential election. She was often targeted as the candidate of the rich and was accused by opponents of not caring about the poor. Her running mate was Arturo Woodman, a well-known entrepreneur, who also led the organization of the 2004 Copa América and the 2005 U-17 World Championship.
- Martha Chávez was the candidate of the pro-Fujimorist Alliance for the Future. She is currently a Congresswoman and was the first female President of Congress. A staunch defender of the former president, she was suspended from Congress in 2002 after corruption accusations, but was reinstated in 2005. Running mate Santiago Fujimori is Alberto's younger brother. As with all of the fujimoristas, she was criticized for defending an administration that is seen as corrupt and authoritarian.
- Valentín Paniagua was the leader of the Center Front, a coalition of centrist parties formed for this election. He was President of Congress before becoming the interim President of Peru (November 2000-July 2001), following the collapse of Fujimori's administration. Running mate Alberto Andrade was mayor of Lima from 1996 to 2002.
- Humberto Lay Sun (National Restoration) is an evangelical pastor and was a member of the Truth and Reconciliation Commission, established to study the atrocities committed in the 1980s and 1990s. Running mate Máximo San Román was Fujimori's Vice-President, but split with him after the 1992 self-coup.

=== Minor presidential nominees ===
- Natale Amprimo (Alliance for Progress), Javier Diez Canseco (Partido Socialista) and Luis Guerrero (Perú Ahora) are current Members of Congress. Guerrero was also mayor of Cajamarca.
- Alberto Borea (Democratic Force) is a former Deputy and Senator. In 1992, he participated in a failed coup against Fujimori, led by Jaime Salinas Sedó, whose son was National Justice's candidate in this election, Jaime Salinas.
- Susana Villarán (Decentralization Coalition) was Minister of Women's Promotion and Social Development during Paniagua's tenure.
- Alberto Fujimori's candidacy was rejected after a ban by Congress forbidding him to hold office until 2011 was upheld.
- Ruling party Possible Peru and ally Independent Moralizing Front (FIM) withdrew their candidates. PP's candidate Rafael Belaúnde was not a party member and clashed with the party's core over the congressional candidate list, which included some people he did not approve of. FIM's leader Fernando Olivera, quit to run for Congress, realizing his slim chances in the presidential race.

=== Presidential tickets ===
| Political party or electoral alliance | Candidates | | |
| Name | for President | for 1st Vice-president | for 2nd Vice-president |
|---|---|---|---|
| Alliance for Progress; Alianza para el Progreso | Natale Amprimo | César Acuña | Julia Valenzuela |
| Alliance for the Future; Alianza por el Futuro | Martha Chávez | Santiago Fujimori | Rolando Sousa |
| And It's Called Peru; Y se llama Perú | Ricardo Wong | Ernesto D'Angelo | José del Carmen Sifuentes |
| Andean Renaissance; Renacimiento Andino | Ciro Gálvez | Patricia Marimón | Carmen Casani |
| Center Front; Frente de Centro | Valentín Paniagua | Alberto Andrade | Gonzalo Aguirre |
| Decentralization Coalition; Concertación Descentralista | Susana Villarán | Nery Saldarriaga | Carlos Paredes |
| Democratic Force; Fuerza Democrática | Alberto Borea | Marco Falconí | Yván Vásquez |
| Democratic Reconstruction; Reconstrucción Democrática | José Cardó Guarderas | Marco Antonio Alcalde | Juana Avellaneda |
| Go On Country; Avanza País | Ulises Humala | Pedro Cenas | Constante Traverso Flores |
| Let's Make Progress Peru; Progresemos Perú | Javier Espinoza | Manuel Yto Seguil | Agustín Quezada Sánchez |
| National Justice; Justicia Nacional | Jaime Salinas | José Carlos Luque Otero | Ana María Villafuerte |
| National Restoration; Restauración Nacional | Humberto Lay Sun | Máximo San Román | María Eugenia de la Puente |
| National Unity; Unidad Nacional | Lourdes Flores Nano | Arturo Woodman | Luis Enrique Carpio |
| New Left Movement; Movimiento Nueva Izquierda * | Alberto Moreno | Juan José Gorriti | Alejandro Narváez |
| Peru Now; Perú Ahora | Luis Guerrero | Víctor Echegaray | Andrés Alcántara |
| Peruvian Aprista Party; Partido Aprista Peruano | Alan García | Luis Giampietri Rojas | Lourdes Mendoza |
| Peruvian Resurgence; Resurgimiento Peruano | Ántero Asto | Carlos Bentín | Roberto Pineda |
| Socialist Party; Partido Socialista | Javier Diez Canseco | María Huamán | Alberto Quintanilla |
| Union for Peru; Unión por el Perú | Ollanta Humala | Gonzalo García Núñez | Carlos Torres Caro |
| With Force Peru; Con Fuerza Perú | Pedro Koechlin Von Stein | Walter Vera Tudela | María Jesús Espinoza |

* Ticket officially registered under MNI, which enjoyed previous registration as a political party, but nominated by Broad Left Front (Frente Amplio de Izquierda).

Tickets rejected by the Special Electoral Jury (Jurado Electoral Especial)
| Political party | Candidate | | | Rejection | |
| Name | for President | for 1st Vice-president | for 2nd Vice-president | Date | Motive |
|---|---|---|---|---|---|
| Sí Cumple | Alberto Fujimori | Luisa María Cuculiza | Germán Kruger | January 10 | Fujimori banned from holding office until 2011 |

Voluntarily Withdrawn Tickets
| Political party | Candidate | | | Withdrawal | |
| Name | for President | for 1st Vice-president | for 2nd Vice-president | Date | Motive |
|---|---|---|---|---|---|
| Peru Possible; Perú Posible | Rafael Belaúnde | Carlos Bruce | Rómulo Mucho Mamani | January 31 | Clash over party's congressional candidate list |
| Independent Moralizing Front; Frente Independiente Moralizador | Fernando Olivera | Fausto Alvarado | Luis Iberico Núñez | February 8 | Olivera to lead party's congressional candidate list |
| Project Country; Proyecto País | Marco Antonio Arrunátegui | Elías Espinoza | María Teresa García | February 8 | Arrunátegui to lead party's congressional candidate list |

=== Congress ===
24 parties presented up to 130 candidates to Congress each, for a total of 2,918 candidates. 331 of these were rejected by the National Jury of Elections, leaving 2,587 candidates. These represent all parties with presidential candidates, plus Possible Peru, Independent Moralizing Front, Project Country, and Agricultural People's Front of Peru (Frente Popular Agrícola del Perú, FREPAP). Sí Cumple did not register any candidates.

The table below shows the breakdown of candidates by Electoral District. Votes by 457,891 Peruvians residing abroad were counted in the Lima Electoral District (the number of voters in the table includes them).

| Electoral District | Registered voters | Seats in Congress | Candidates per party | Participating parties | Total candidates |
|---|---|---|---|---|---|
| Amazonas | 179,331 | 2 | 3 | 17 | 47 |
| Ancash | 611,881 | 5 | 5 | 21 | 99 |
| Apurímac | 195,954 | 2 | 3 | 21 | 55 |
| Arequipa | 770,535 | 5 | 5 | 21 | 101 |
| Ayacucho | 306,662 | 3 | 3 | 20 | 58 |
| Cajamarca | 721,239 | 5 | 5 | 23 | 109 |
| Callao | 541,730 | 4 | 4 | 24 | 92 |
| Cusco | 643,629 | 5 | 5 | 22 | 98 |
| Huancavelica | 203,844 | 2 | 3 | 15 | 39 |
| Huánuco | 354,416 | 3 | 3 | 22 | 65 |
| Ica | 451,197 | 4 | 5 | 22 | 88 |
| Junín | 701,190 | 5 | 5 | 22 | 99 |
| La Libertad | 942,656 | 7 | 7 | 22 | 145 |
| Lambayeque | 676,735 | 5 | 5 | 22 | 101 |
| Lima | 6,063,109 | 35 | 35 | 24 | 738 |
| Loreto | 416,419 | 3 | 3 | 22 | 60 |
| Madre de Dios | 47,742 | 1 | 3 | 14 | 35 |
| Moquegua | 99,962 | 2 | 3 | 18 | 44 |
| Pasco | 135,670 | 2 | 3 | 17 | 51 |
| Piura | 914,912 | 6 | 6 | 23 | 136 |
| Puno | 674,865 | 5 | 5 | 23 | 106 |
| San Martín | 357,124 | 3 | 3 | 17 | 47 |
| Tacna | 172,427 | 2 | 3 | 18 | 57 |
| Tumbes | 110,335 | 2 | 3 | 19 | 57 |
| Ucayali | 201,342 | 2 | 3 | 22 | 60 |
| Nationwide | 16,494,906 | 120 | 130 | 14-24 | 2,587 |

=== Andean Parliament ===
A total of 21 parties nominated 15 candidates for the Andean Parliament each, for a total of 315 candidates. 73 candidates were rejected by the National Jury of Elections, leaving 242 candidates from 19 parties. Participating parties include all those with Congressional candidates, except And It's Called Peru, Decentralization Coalition, Democratic Force, FREPAP and Let's Make Progress Peru.

== Campaign ==
=== Presidential debate ===
The only official presidential debate was held on May 21, 2006 between Ollanta Humala and Alan García, with journalist Augusto Álvarez Rodrich as moderator, in the National Museum of Archaeology. There were no debates before the first round.

Humala arrived late, so García started the debate on his own, claiming that his opponent had "stopped at a bar for a sandwich" and accusing him of having "no respect for the country". Humala accused Aprista supporters of delaying his arrival.

Álvarez Rodrich asked Humala to remove a small Peruvian flag on his podium before his first intervention, in order to have equitative images for both contenders. The candidate refused, saying that the national symbol was nothing to be ashamed about and arguing that the debate arrangements did not forbid using it, leading the moderator to withdraw the flag himself.

The Union for Peru candidate attacked García's position on a bilateral free trade agreement with the United States as "ambiguous"; said that Vladimiro Montesinos would evidently vote for his opponent (since the former intelligence chief had recently claimed that Humala's uprising in 2001 had been staged as a distraction for his escape from the country); reminded the audience of a tape showing Montesinos bribing former Peruvian Aprista Party Secretary-General Agustín Mantilla; alluded to a paramilitary group that operated during García's presidency; promised not to receive his salary if he got elected, but only his payments as a retired Lieutenant Colonel; proposed the formation of a Constituent Assembly to rewrite the Constitution on the basis of its 1979 version; and suggested the possibility of reopening a penitentiary, where corrupt government officials and "ex-presidents" would be sent, in a tacit attack at García.

García called Humala a "demagogue" for promising to lower fuel prices by 30 percent; reminded his opponent of his earnings as a military attaché in France and South Korea; called on Humala for asking García to clarify whether he would free Montesinos or not, saying that such decision would concern the Judiciary branch anyway and that pretending to take such powers would be undemocratic, "in the style of (Hugo) Chávez"; indirectly pointed to Humala's support of his brother Antauro's 2005 rebellion, leading to the death of four policemen; and promised to enforce the payment of extra hours, stop arbitrary employment terminations and change some aspects of pension systems.

The media and political analysts described the debate mostly as "boring" and centered on personal attacks, with García not delivering a decisive victory, despite his much greater political experience. Opinion polls in Metropolitan Lima and Callao gave García a clear victory over Humala, though these were anti-Humala strongholds throughout the campaign. A debate between the technical teams of both candidates was held on May 28 in the Museum of the Nation.

=== Highlights ===
- Important issues during the campaign included economic policy, unemployment, education, healthcare, drug trafficking, terrorist activities, the exploitation of the Camisea natural gas reserves, the management of ports by foreign companies, a maritime border dispute with Chile, birth control and abortion, and renewal of Congress.
- In January 2006, Ollanta Humala attended a ceremony held in honor of then President-Elect of Bolivia, Evo Morales, by Venezuelan President Hugo Chávez, who publicly endorsed Humala. Chávez also called Lourdes Flores "the candidate of the Peruvian oligarchy". These events prompted a row between Chávez and the Peruvian government, who accused him of interfering in Peru's internal affairs. Humala later met with Brazilian and Argentine presidents Lula da Silva and Néstor Kirchner. The former had also invited Flores and García, but they declined.
- In late April, after Chávez announced that Venezuela would leave the Andean Community unless Colombia, Ecuador and Peru abandoned their plans for Free Trade Agreements with the United States, Alan García criticized him, arguing that this was equivalent to blackmail, and that it was very hypocritical, considering the amounts of oil exports from Venezuela to the US. Chávez responded by calling García "corrupt" and a "thief", and the new candidate of Peru's rich and of the US, following Flores' defeat. He also endorsed Humala again and threatened to withdraw his ambassador to Peru if García won. After accusations by García and the Peruvian government of interference in the election by the Venezuelan president, Toledo and García were called "caimans from the same well" and the former was labelled as US President Bush's "puppet" and "office boy" by Chávez. This led to the mutual withdrawal of ambassadors. García had been the notable exception to criticism of Humala's January meeting with Chávez, in an apparent move to avoid confrontation with the latter, who could be a leftist ally in the region during his potential presidency.
- On May 25, a violent clash between supporters of Ollanta Humala and Alan García in Cusco left five injured people, including two (three by other accounts) wounded by gunshot.
- National Unity was accused of buying off candidates to pull out of the race, including Fernando Olivera, who did withdraw, and Jaime Salinas. Olivera's FIM party later showed TV advertisements directly attacking Alan García, and was ordered to stop by the National Jury of Elections. The ruling was not obeyed and Jorge Del Castillo, Secretary General of Peruvian Aprista Party and Member of Congress, showed documents allegedly proving a secret pact between FIM and Lourdes Flores' Unidad Nacional party accounting for the attacks on García. In response, Olivera sued him for forging the documents.
- A section of National Unity accused the Peruvian Aprista Party of electoral fraud, following the narrow victory of Alan García over Lourdes Flores in the race for the second runoff spot.
- On April 7, just two days before the first round, José Cardó Guarderas (Democratic Reconstruction) and Ciro Gálvez (Andean Renaissance) dropped from the presidential race and announced their support for Lourdes Flores' candidacy and their opposition to Ollanta Humala's. Only Cardó presented his official resignation to the National Jury of Elections, but his votes were still counted officially. The day before, Ricardo Wong (And It's Called Peru), who had withdrawn his candidacy before and later retracted, announced that he dropped the race in favor of Alan García. Given the proximity of the election, there were no changes to the ballot.
- In the second round campaigning for the Peruvian elections Diego Maradona the Argentinian soccer star, announced that he would visit Peru on May 4 to play a friendly game with former Peruvian soccer players. Maradona has also expressed his support for Humala's campaign and is a personal friend of Cuban President Fidel Castro and Venezuelan President Hugo Chávez. In response to the announcement that Maradona was coming to Peru to support Humala the candidate for the APRA party Alan García was quoted as saying "Maradona comes by order from his friends in Cuba and Venezuela and even so Ollanta Humala will not manage to pull a goal on us". In the end, Maradona did not make any political statements after all.
- Ollanta Humala was accused of torturing and killing peasants under the nom de guerre "Capitán Carlos" when he was the commander of a military base in the jungle from 1992 to 1993. National Unity was accused of buying off witnesses to testify against him. His brother Antauro confirmed that he used that name and said that he acted "according to the rules of the Army".
- In December 2005, Peru reached a deal with the United States on a Free Trade Agreement between the two countries. Some candidates, such as Ollanta Humala, opposed the agreement, others like Lourdes Flores supported it, and still others like Alan García approved parts of it and advocated revising it. The Toledo administration announced that it would be signed after the first round in order to avoid affecting the election's outcome. The agreement was finally signed on April 12 in Washington, D.C., and ratified by Peru's Congress on June 28, but must be ratified by the U.S. Congress before coming into force.
- Isaac Humala, father of candidates Ollanta and Ulises, said that he would free Shining Path and MRTA leaders Abimael Guzmán and Víctor Polay, since he considered that terrorist movements no longer represent a threat to Peruvian society. This came after a letter was signed by several public figures, including Ulises and fellow candidates Javier Diez Canseco and Alberto Moreno, demanding a fair trial for Polay. Most candidates rushed to condemn Isaac Humala's comments, including Ollanta and even Ulises, whose candidacy had been openly supported by his father. Around the same time, Elena Humala, the candidates' mother, claimed that homosexuals and rapists should be shot, which apparently prompted Ollanta to ask his parents to stop making public statements.
- In an April 4 interview with Argentine newspaper Página/12, Ollanta Humala claimed that, if Lourdes Flores were elected, she would be overthrown in less than a year. Given his past uprising, this was interpreted as a coup threat, leading opponents to accuse him again of having no respect for democracy.
- Peru's only living Roman Catholic Cardinal, Juan Luis Cipriani exhorted the electorate not to fall for "messianic" candidates, in one of several tacit references to Ollanta Humala.
- Minister of Justice Alejandro Tudela Chipotea announced that Antauro and Ollanta Humala would be sued for complicity with Vladimiro Montesinos. While their October 2000 uprising was publicized as an insurrection against the Fujimori administration, there have been accusations of it being staged in order to create a distraction so that the fugitive Montesinos could flee the country, which he did the same day aboard a yacht. César Mojovich, a former National Police Commissioner of Toquepala, revealed this in a TV show, and apparently there are records of calls from Montesinos to the Humala brothers' military base just hours before the uprising. In mid-May 2006, Montesinos himself claimed that Humala's uprising was indeed a farce, though his statements were interpreted by some as an attempt to affect the outcome of the runoff election.
- Union for Peru's vice-presidential candidate Carlos Torres Caro was accused of sexual harassment by two of his former students, and of electoral fraud cover-up in 1995. The presidential candidate for Project Country, Marco Antonio Arrunátegui, who withdrew from the race, had a pending judicial process for sexual exploitation of minors.
- The National Electoral Jury admitted the failure of an Electoral Ethical Pact between the parties, given the widespread personal attacks between the candidates. Asociación Civil Transparencia, an unaffiliated citizen group, also lamented the overall tone of the campaign.
- OAS and European Parliament observers denied the possibility of an electoral fraud, which was suggested by Ollanta Humala, who accused the government of favoring Lourdes Flores in the first round. The OAS mission sent personnel to emergency zones in Peru, where remnants of Shining Path (Sendero Luminoso) were known to operate. SL called for a boycott of the election.
- The election was initially going to use two separate ballots, by decision of the National Office of Electoral Processes: one for the Presidential election, the other for the Congressional and Andean Parliament elections. After the formal protest of several parties, the National Jury of Elections ruled that the ballots had to be merged into one.
- Members of the Armed Forces and the National Police were able to vote for the first time in 180 years. Up to 50% were eligible to vote, with an estimated 35% actually voting.

== Results ==
=== President ===
| Candidate | Party | First round | | Second round | |
| Candidate | Party | Votes | % | Votes | % |
|---|---|---|---|---|---|
| Ollanta Humala | Union for Peru | 3,758,258 | 30.62 | 6,270,080 | 47.37 |
| Alan García | American Popular Revolutionary Alliance | 2,985,858 | 24.32 | 6,965,017 | 52.63 |
| Lourdes Flores | National Unity | 2,923,280 | 23.81 | | |
| Martha Chávez | Alliance for the Future | 912,420 | 7.43 | | |
| Valentín Paniagua | Center Front | 706,156 | 5.75 | | |
| Humberto Lay | National Restoration | 537,564 | 4.38 | | |
| Susana Villarán | Decentralization Coalition | 76,106 | 0.62 | | |
| Jaime Salinas | National Justice | 65,636 | 0.53 | | |
| Javier Diez Canseco | Socialist Party | 60,955 | 0.50 | | |
| Natale Amprimo | Alliance for Progress | 49,332 | 0.40 | | |
| Pedro Koechlin von Stein | With Force Peru | 38,212 | 0.31 | | |
| Alberto Moreno | New Left Movement | 33,918 | 0.28 | | |
| Alberto Borea | Democratic Force | 24,584 | 0.20 | | |
| Ulises Humala | Go on Country | 24,518 | 0.20 | | |
| Ciro Gálvez | Andean Renaissance | 22,892 | 0.19 | | |
| Javier Espinoza | Let's Make Progress Peru | 13,965 | 0.11 | | |
| José Cardó Guarderas | Democratic Reconstruction | 11,925 | 0.10 | | |
| Ántero Asto | Peruvian Resurgence | 10,857 | 0.09 | | |
| Ricardo Wong | And It's Called Peru | 10,539 | 0.09 | | |
| Luis Guerrero | Peru Now | 8,410 | 0.07 | | |
| Total | | 12,275,385 | 100.00 | 13,235,097 | 100.00 |
| Valid votes | | 12,275,385 | 83.89 | 13,235,097 | 91.48 |
| Invalid/blank votes | | 2,356,618 | 16.11 | 1,233,181 | 8.52 |
| Total votes | | 14,632,003 | 100.00 | 14,468,278 | 100.00 |
| Registered voters/turnout | | 16,494,906 | 88.71 | | |
Source: "Estadística electoral" (PDF) (in Spanish). Jurado Nacional de Elecciones. 2006.

=== Congress ===
Union for Peru obtained 45 out of 120 seats in Congress, more than any other party, but still shy of an absolute majority, despite victories in 16 of 25 Electoral Districts. The Peruvian Aprista Party got the most votes in six Districts and took 36 seats. National Unity obtained 17 seats and a local victory in Lima; Alliance for the Future took 13 seats and won in Pasco; Center Front got 5 seats; ruling party Possible Peru only got 2, after being the stronger party in the 2001-2006 period; and National Restoration took the remaining 2 seats, as well as most votes in Madre de Dios. The latter two obtained barely above the minimum 4% of valid votes nationwide for Congress representation.

The strongholds for the three main parties were essentially the same as in the presidential election: the southern Andes for Union for Peru, the northern-central coast for the Peruvian Aprista Party, and Lima (plus voters abroad, which counted as part of this Electoral District) for National Unity.

Former President Alberto Fujimori's daughter Keiko, of Alliance for the Future, obtained 602,869 votes, the highest individual voting nationwide (though it should be taken into account that she ran in Lima, the Electoral District with, by far, the largest electorate). She was followed by Carlos Bruce of Possible Peru, a former Minister of Housing, Construction and Sanitation, with 193,374.

The most voted candidate of the party with the most votes presides over the preparatory board for the installation of the new Congress. However, this corresponded to Carlos Torres Caro, Union for Peru's candidate for Second Vice-President, who, along with Gustavo Espinoza and Rocío González resigned from the party following the second round, arguing that Humala's approach to their role as an opposition party was too violent. The three incoming Members of Congress presented the new Peruvian Democratic Party on 26 June.

Center Front, Possible Peru and National Restoration agreed to formally create a joint group in Congress with their 9 members, under the name of the first party. This new group was the only one without representation in the multi-partisan Directive Board of the new Congress, led by the Peruvian Aprista Party's Mercedes Cabanillas as president.

| Party | Votes | % | Seats |
|---|---|---|---|
| Union for Peru | 2,274,797 | 21.15 | 45 |
| American Popular Revolutionary Alliance | 2,213,623 | 20.59 | 36 |
| National Unity | 1,648,717 | 15.33 | 17 |
| Alliance for the Future | 1,408,069 | 13.09 | 13 |
| Center Front | 760,261 | 7.07 | 5 |
| Possible Peru | 441,462 | 4.11 | 2 |
| National Restoration | 432,209 | 4.02 | 2 |
| Alliance for Progress | 248,400 | 2.31 | 0 |
| Democratic Force | 153,437 | 1.43 | 0 |
| Independent Moralizing Front | 156,433 | 1.45 | 0 |
| National Justice | 151,167 | 1.41 | 0 |
| Socialist Party | 134,166 | 1.25 | 0 |
| New Left Movement | 133,106 | 1.24 | 0 |
| Go on Country | 122,654 | 1.14 | 0 |
| Decentralization Coalition | 91,784 | 0.85 | 0 |
| Agricultural People's Front of Peru | 85,019 | 0.79 | 0 |
| Andean Renaissance | 75,445 | 0.70 | 0 |
| With Force Peru | 71,385 | 0.66 | 0 |
| Peru Now | 46,443 | 0.43 | 0 |
| Democratic Reconstruction | 28,775 | 0.27 | 0 |
| Project Country | 21,534 | 0.20 | 0 |
| Peruvian Resurgence | 20,579 | 0.19 | 0 |
| Let's Make Progress Peru | 13,999 | 0.13 | 0 |
| And It's Called Peru | 19,859 | 0.18 | 0 |
| Total | 10,753,323 | 100.00 | 120 |
| Valid votes | 10,753,323 | 73.53 | |
| Invalid/blank votes | 3,871,557 | 26.47 | |
| Total votes | 14,624,880 | 100.00 | |
| Registered voters/turnout | 16,494,906 | 88.66 | |
Source: "Estadística electoral" (PDF) (in Spanish). Jurado Nacional de Elecciones. 2006.

==== By region ====
| Electoral District | UPP | PAP | UN | AF | FC | PP | RN | Total |
|---|---|---|---|---|---|---|---|---|
| Amazonas | 1 | 1 | | | | | | 2 |
| Ancash | 2 | 2 | 1 | | | | | 5 |
| Apurímac | 2 | | | | | | | 2 |
| Arequipa | 3 | 1 | 1 | | | | | 5 |
| Ayacucho | 3 | | | | | | | 3 |
| Cajamarca | 2 | 1 | 1 | 1 | | | | 5 |
| Callao | 1 | 2 | 1 | | | | | 4 |
| Cusco | 4 | 1 | | | | | | 5 |
| Huancavelica | 2 | | | | | | | 2 |
| Huánuco | 2 | 1 | | | | | | 3 |
| Ica | 1 | 2 | 1 | | | | | 4 |
| Junín | 2 | 1 | 1 | 1 | | | | 5 |
| La Libertad | 1 | 5 | 1 | | | | | 7 |
| Lambayeque | 1 | 2 | 1 | 1 | | | | 5 |
| Lima | 6 | 7 | 8 | 8 | 3 | 2 | 1 | 35 |
| Loreto | 1 | 1 | | | 1 | | | 3 |
| Madre de Dios | | | | | | | 1 | 1 |
| Moquegua | 1 | 1 | | | | | | 2 |
| Pasco | 1 | | | 1 | | | | 2 |
| Piura | 2 | 3 | 1 | | | | | 6 |
| Puno | 3 | 1 | | | 1 | | | 5 |
| San Martín | 1 | 1 | | 1 | | | | 3 |
| Tacna | 1 | 1 | | | | | | 2 |
| Tumbes | 1 | 1 | | | | | | 2 |
| Ucayali | 1 | 1 | | | | | | 2 |
| Total | 45 | 36 | 17 | 13 | 5 | 2 | 2 | 120 |

=== Andean Parliament ===
Only the three main parties obtained representation in the Andean Parliament, with Union for Peru and the Peruvian Aprista Party obtaining 2 seats (plus 4 substitutes) each, and National Unity getting one seat (and two substitutes). Union for Peru got the most votes, with 24.0% of the valid ballots. Congressman Rafael Rey of National Unity obtained the most individual votes, with 611,638, after which he announced his own and his party National Renewal's departure from the coalition.

| Party | Votes | % | Seats |
|---|---|---|---|
| Union for Peru | 2,044,863 | 23.97 | 2 |
| American Popular Revolutionary Alliance | 1,927,836 | 22.60 | 2 |
| National Unity | 1,812,385 | 21.24 | 1 |
| Alliance for the Future | 793,442 | 9.30 | 0 |
| Center Front | 479,365 | 5.62 | 0 |
| National Restoration | 435,844 | 5.11 | 0 |
| Possible Peru | 193,685 | 2.27 | 0 |
| Alliance for Progress | 140,505 | 1.65 | 0 |
| Socialist Party | 140,089 | 1.64 | 0 |
| National Justice | 96,982 | 1.14 | 0 |
| With Force Peru | 95,599 | 1.12 | 0 |
| New Left Movement | 81,699 | 0.96 | 0 |
| Independent Moralizing Front | 77,512 | 0.91 | 0 |
| Go on Country | 64,220 | 0.75 | 0 |
| Andean Renaissance | 53,070 | 0.62 | 0 |
| Democratic Reconstruction | 27,398 | 0.32 | 0 |
| Peru Now | 24,571 | 0.29 | 0 |
| Peruvian Resurgence | 22,055 | 0.26 | 0 |
| Project Country | 20,312 | 0.24 | 0 |
| Total | 8,531,432 | 100.00 | 5 |
| Valid votes | 8,531,432 | 58.33 | |
| Invalid/blank votes | 6,093,799 | 41.67 | |
| Total votes | 14,625,231 | 100.00 | |
| Registered voters/turnout | 16,494,906 | 88.67 | |
Source: "Estadística electoral" (PDF) (in Spanish). Jurado Nacional de Elecciones. 2006.
