= 2018 Lima municipal election =

- 7 October 2018
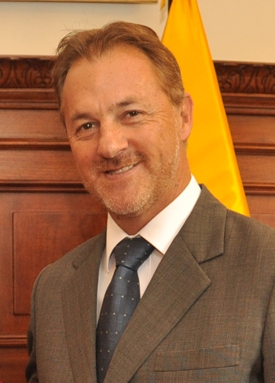

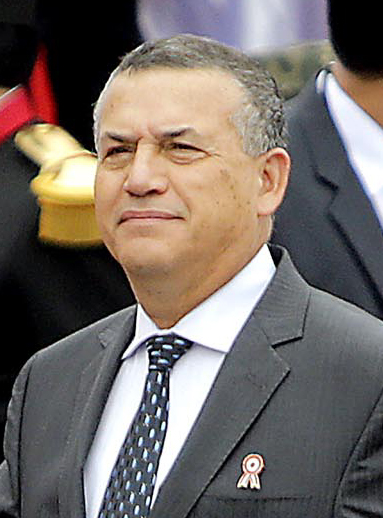

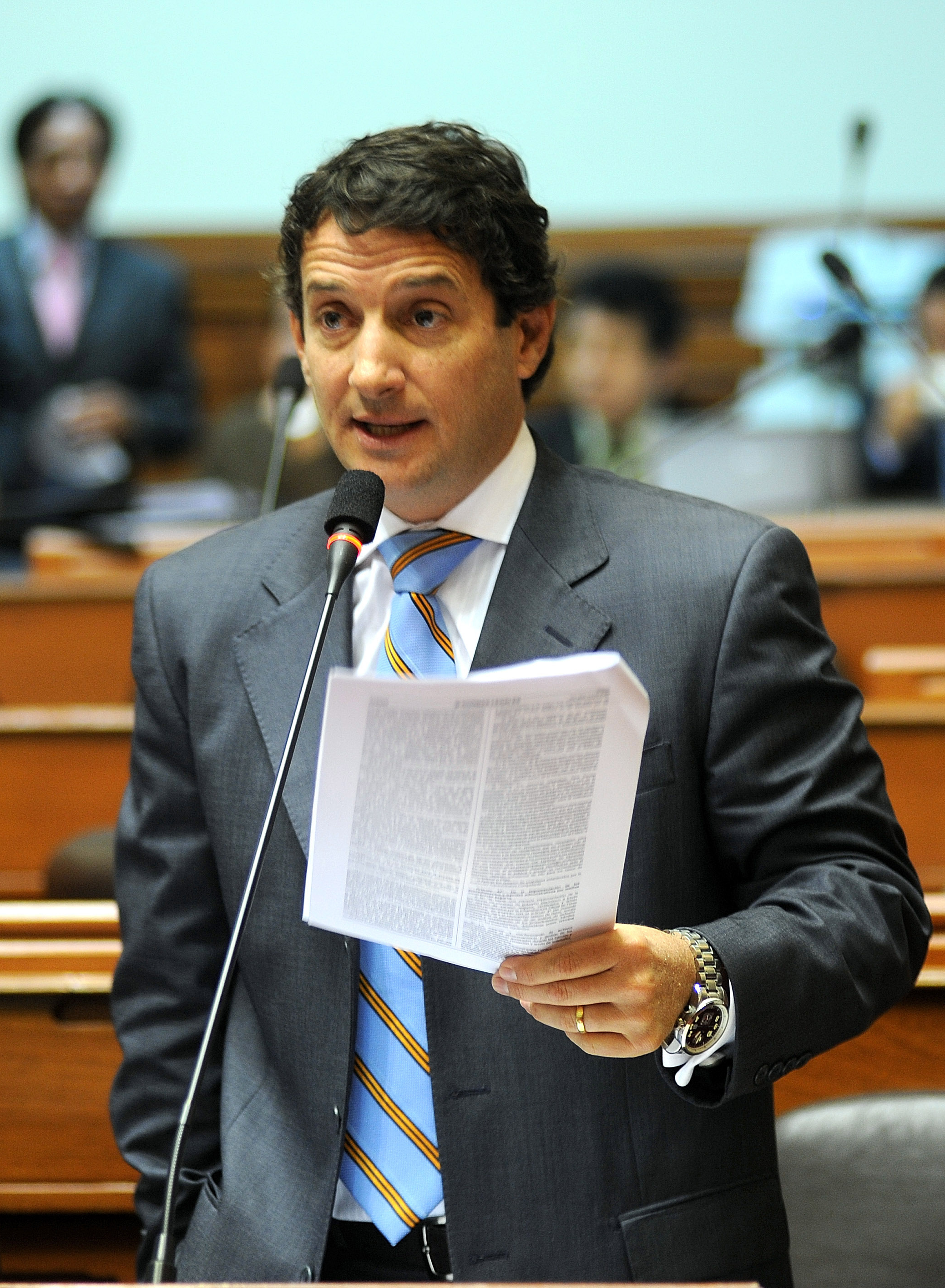
Candidate	Jorge Muñoz Wells	Daniel Urresti	Renzo Reggiardo
Party	Popular Action	Podemos Perú	Peru Secure Homeland
Popular vote	1,907,693	1,042,481	469,533
Percentage	36.03%	19.69%	8.87%
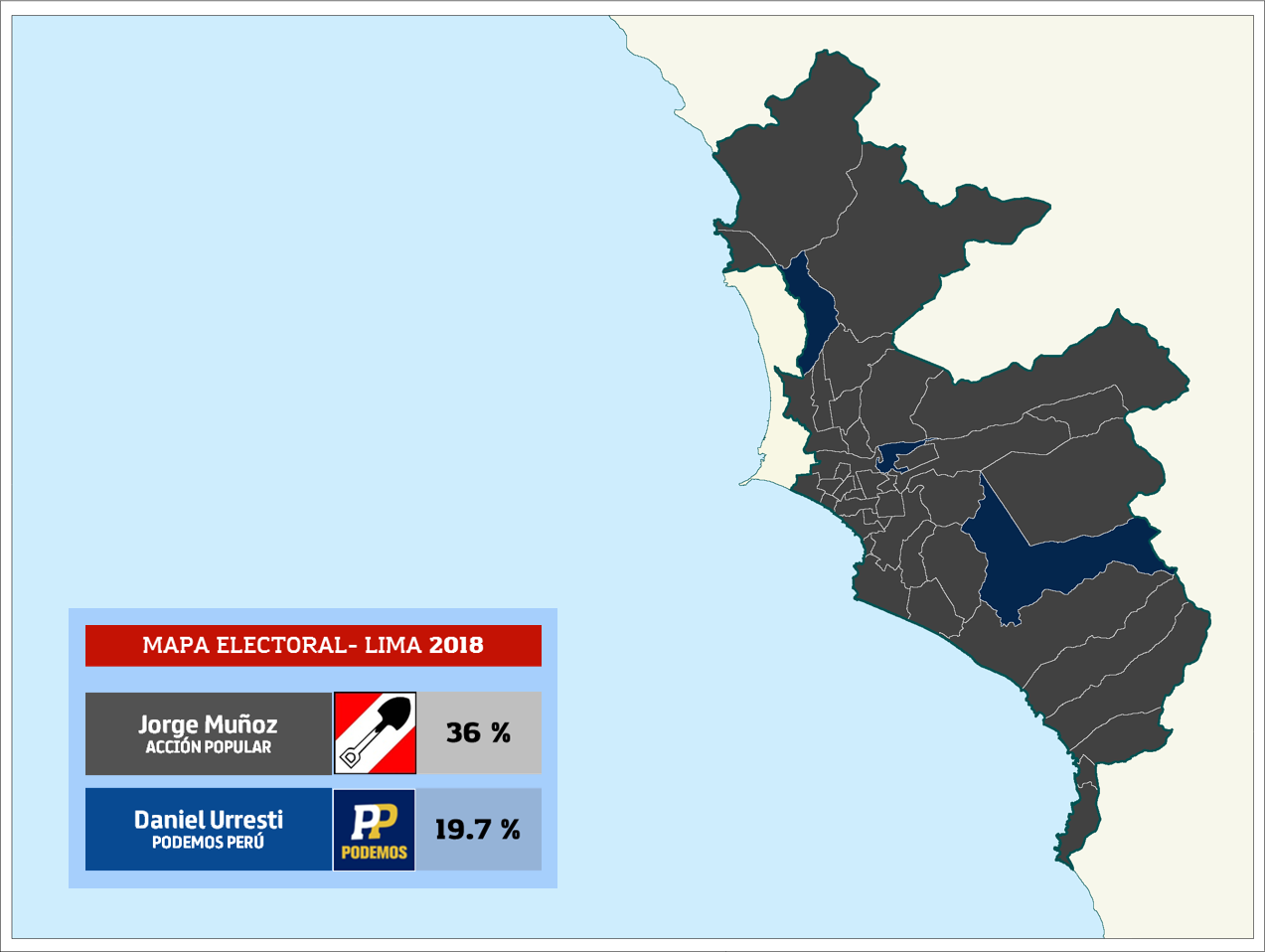
Mayor before election
Luis Castañeda
National Solidarity
Elected Mayor
Jorge Muñoz Wells
Popular Action

The 2018 Lima municipal election was held on 7 October 2018 as part of the wider 2018 Peruvian regional and municipal elections. Voters in the Lima Province elected the Mayor of Metropolitan Lima and the 39 members of the Metropolitan Council (Concejo Metropolitano de Lima) for the 2019–2022 term. Jorge Muñoz Wells, the outgoing mayor of the Miraflores District and candidate of Popular Action (Acción Popular), was elected mayor with 36.03% of the valid vote, defeating a field of twenty candidates. He was proclaimed mayor-elect by the Special Electoral Jury of Lima Centre on 6 November 2018 and took office on 1 January 2019. The result marked the first time Popular Action had won the Lima mayoralty since Eduardo Orrego Villacorta in 1980.

== Background ==
Under Law No. 30305, a constitutional reform enacted in March 2015 that amended articles 191, 194 and 203 of the Constitution of Peru, regional governors and mayors were barred from seeking immediate re-election. The reform meant that incumbent mayor Luis Castañeda Lossio of National Solidarity, who had governed Lima since 2015 (and previously from 2003 to 2010), could not run for another consecutive term. His party instead nominated his son, Luis Castañeda Pardo, who was selected as the National Solidarity candidate at a provincial assembly held in Lurín.

The elder Castañeda's administration left office with an approval rating of around 34% amid criticism over stalled and questionable infrastructure projects, and his tenure was separately shadowed by corruption investigations linked to the Comunicore case and the broader Lava Jato scandal. That climate weighed heavily on his son's campaign, which finished ninth with 2.58% of the vote. Fifteen months after the election, in February 2020, a judge ordered 24 months of pre-trial detention for Luis Castañeda Lossio in a case connected to Odebrecht's financing of his 2014 mayoral campaign.

== Candidates ==
Twenty candidates registered to contest the mayoralty of Metropolitan Lima:

- Alberto Beingolea Delgado – Christian People's Party
- Ricardo Belmont Cassinelli – Libertarian Peru
- Esther Capuñay Quispe – Union for Peru
- Luis Castañeda Pardo – National Solidarity
- Diethell Columbus Murata – Popular Force
- Enrique Cornejo Ramírez – Direct Democracy
- Enrique Fernández Chacón – Broad Front for Justice, Life and Liberty
- Julio Gagó Pérez – Go on Country – Social Integration Party
- Roberto Gómez Baca – Let's Go Peru
- Gustavo Guerra García Picasso – Together for Peru
- Humberto Lay Sun – National Restoration
- Jorge Muñoz Wells – Popular Action
- Luis Enrique Ocrospoma Pella – Peru Nation
- Renzo Reggiardo Barreto – Peru Secure Homeland
- Jaime Salinas López Torres – Alliance for Progress
- Pablo Silva Rojas – Agricultural People's Front of Peru
- Daniel Urresti Elera – Podemos Perú
- Manuel Velarde Dellepiane – Always United
- Jorge Villacorta Carranza – Peruvians for Change
- Juan Carlos Zurek Pardo Figueroa – We Are Peru

== Campaign ==
Public security and crime dominated the campaign. Two of the frontrunners, retired army general and former Interior Minister Daniel Urresti (Podemos Perú) and Renzo Reggiardo (Peru Secure Homeland), built their candidacies around anti-crime platforms. Urresti's campaign was shadowed for months by his prosecution over the 1988 killing of journalist Hugo Bustíos; he was formally acquitted only three days before the election. Reggiardo's campaign lost momentum in the final stretch after he declined to take part in the televised mayoral debate. Ricardo Belmont, mayor of Lima from 1990 to 1995, mounted a further bid for the office but bled support after adopting hardline rhetoric against Venezuelan immigrants.

Jorge Muñoz, mayor of the Miraflores District since 2010, entered the final weeks of the campaign polling around 2.5%, but surged among undecided voters attracted to his moderate, technocratic profile and administrative record in Miraflores, ultimately winning just over a third of the vote.

== Results ==
Candidate	Party	Votes	%
Jorge Muñoz	Popular Action	1,907,693	36.03
Daniel Urresti	Podemos Perú	1,042,481	19.69
Renzo Reggiardo	Peru Secure Homeland	469,533	8.87
Alberto Beingolea	Christian People's Party	236,320	4.46
Ricardo Belmont	Libertarian Peru	205,716	3.89
Juan Carlos Zurek	We Are Peru	190,194	3.59
Jaime Salinas	Alliance for Progress	186,348	3.52
Diethell Columbus	Popular Force	142,913	2.70
Luis Castañeda Pardo	National Solidarity	136,657	2.58
Pablo Silva Rojas	Agricultural People's Front of Peru	113,001	2.13
Esther Capuñay Quispe	Union for Peru	107,972	2.04
Enrique Cornejo	Direct Democracy	106,197	2.01
Humberto Lay	National Restoration	104,707	1.98
Manuel Velarde Dellepiane	Always United	98,322	1.86
Enrique Fernández Chacón	Broad Front for Justice, Life and Liberty	81,373	1.54
Gustavo Guerra García	Together for Peru	39,888	0.75
Julio Gagó	Go on Country	39,564	0.75
Roberto Gómez Baca	Let's Go Peru	35,251	0.67
Luis Enrique Ocrospoma	Peru Nation	32,144	0.61
Jorge Villacorta Carranza	Peruvians for Change	17,919	0.34
Total valid votes		5,294,193	100.00

Source: National Office of Electoral Processes (ONPE), as reported by El Comercio.

== Metropolitan Council ==
The 39 seats of the Metropolitan Council of Lima for the 2019–2022 term were distributed among the parties that cleared the electoral threshold, using the D'Hondt method:

image=
Party	Seats
Popular Action	21
Podemos Perú	8
Peru Secure Homeland	4
Christian People's Party	1
We Are Peru	1
Peru Libertarian	1
Alliance for Progress	1
Popular Force	1
National Solidarity	1
Total	39

== Aftermath ==
Jorge Muñoz was sworn in as Mayor of Lima on 1 January 2019 for a term running through 2022. His election, together with Popular Action's 21-seat majority on the Metropolitan Council, was widely described in the Peruvian press as a revival of the party founded by Fernando Belaúnde Terry, which had not won the Lima mayoralty since Eduardo Orrego in 1980.

== See also ==
- 2018 Peruvian regional and municipal elections
- List of mayors of Lima
- Metropolitan Municipality of Lima
