= Alberto Beingolea =

Peruvian politician

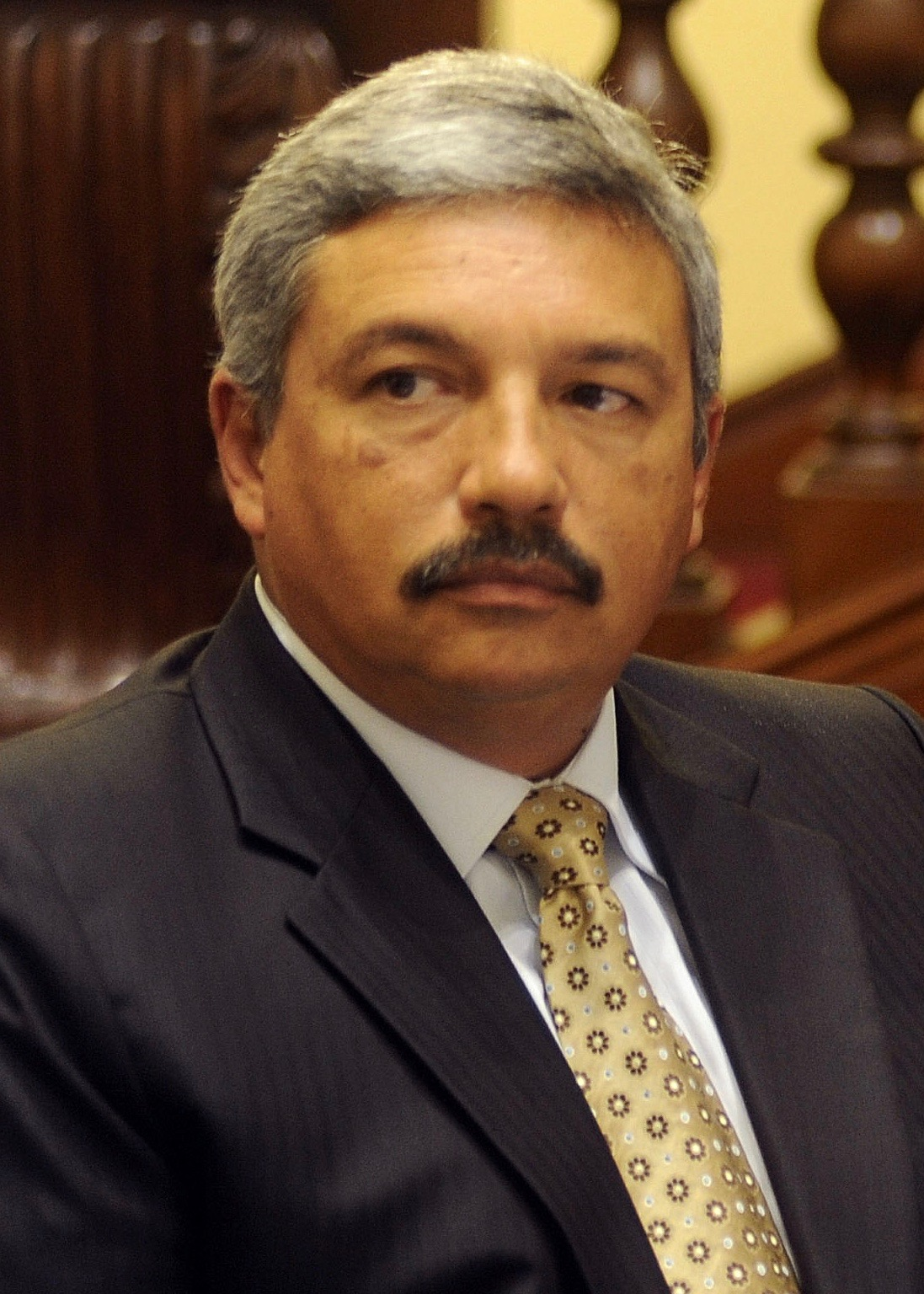
- Beingolea in 2012

President of the Christian People's Party
- In office 16 December 2017 – 15 April 2021
- Vice President: Edinson Terán; Gino Amoreti; Rosana Huarcaya; José Risi
- Preceded by: Alonso Navarro Cabanillas
- Succeeded by: Carlos Neuhaus

Minister of Culture
- Incumbent
- Assumed office 28 July 2026
- President: Keiko Fujimori
- Prime Minister: Luis Galarreta
- Preceded by: Fátima Altabás

Member of Congress
- In office 26 July 2011 – 26 July 2016
- Constituency: Lima

Personal details
- Born: Alberto Ismael Beingolea Delgado; 19 November 1964 (age 61) Lima, Peru
- Party: Christian People's Party (2003–2021)
- Other political affiliations: Alliance for the Great Change (2010–2011)
- Education: Pontifical Catholic University of Peru (LLB) (LLM)
- Occupation: Sports journalist Politician
- Profession: Lawyer

Alberto Ismael Beingolea Delgado (born 19 November 1964) is a Peruvian politician who was the President of the Christian People's Party between 2017 and 2021. Beingolea currently serves as Minister of Culture under President Keiko Fujimori since July 2026. He is a former Congressman, representing Lima between 2011 and 2016. Before entering politics, he was a journalist and sports commentator.

== Early life and education ==
Beingolea was born in Lima on 19 November 1964. He completed his elementary and secondary education at the San Luis Maristas School of Barranco.

Upon graduation, he was admitted to the Pontifical Catholic University of Peru, from which he received his law degree in June 1990. Specializing in criminal law, he completed his a master's degree in that specialty at the same university in 2009.

As a university professor, he is a member of the Department of Law of the Catholic University, where he also teaches, for the Faculty of Communication Sciences, courses in sports journalism and deontology. He is also an itinerant professor of criminal law at the César Vallejo University, a subject that he also taught before at the University of San Martín de Porres.

== Journalistic career ==
Beingolea has a long history as a journalist and sportscaster. He started on television at the age of 13, integrating the cast of the program Los Niños y su Mundo by Yola Polastri. He was later promoted by América Televisión to broadcast the 1982 FIFA World Cup before turning 18, and since then he has been a member of the sports staff of that channel, with which he also broadcast the 1986 FIFA World Cup, the 1984 Olympics and 1988 Olympics, qualifying rounds, World Athletics Championships, the 86 Volleyball World Cup, Libertadores Cups, and many more tournaments. In 1986, he was given for the first time the conduction of his own program of World Cup memories: The Best of the World Cup, and after that, he took over the sports sequence of the América Televisión newscasts. In 1990, after resigning from América Televisión due to differences with management, he was hired by Panamericana Televisión to broadcast the 1990 FIFA World Cup in Italy, with El Veco and Humberto Martínez Morosini.

After the 1990 FIFA World Cup, Beingolea decided to accept the defunct offer of Global Televisión Canal 13, a small channel that wanted to prioritize his sports programming. There he had full autonomy, creating and conducting the Goles en Acción program, with which soccer programs began on Sunday nights on Peruvian television. He also directed Acción on Saturday and Sunday afternoons and created a range of daily sports programs, the most memorable being Más Acción in the mornings and Acción al día in the evenings.

With that staff in January 1999 he went to ATV, where they changed their name and called themselves El Equipo, the main program being El Equipo de Goles, dedicated to soccer on Sundays at 10 pm. The team made a great and extensive coverage of the World Cup in France 98 and was one of the main responsible for exacerbating Chilean spirits in the match that the Peruvian team faced their Chilean counterpart in Santiago de Chile in October 1997, in which they lost by 4 to 0, thus losing the qualifying by goal difference. He resigned from said program in 2000, denouncing that the Alberto Fujimori regime had infiltrated its journalistic operators into ATV, with the complicity of their owners, to try to save themselves from what was his downfall. With him, his entire team resigned, ending a prolific decade, which set styles and guidelines for sports journalism on TV.

Between 2001 and 2003, Beingolea later reappeared as the sports director of Frecuencia Latina for two years.

In June 2003, Beingolea joined CMD, where he hosted the programs Crónicas de balón, Versus and Partido Aparte, being the main commentator for the Campeonato Descentralizado and the Peru national team, qualifying rounds and world championships in 2006 and 2011. In January 2011, during broadcasting Versus' first show of the year, he gave up his 33-year career as a sports journalist to run for a seat in the Peruvian Congress.

== Political career ==
=== Early political career ===
As a supporter of the Christian People's Party, Beingolea participated at a very young age in district campaigns to return to democracy after the Velasco dictatorship, although he registered in the party in 2003. He participated in the bases of Barranco and San Isidro, beginning his career within the party ranks in the second district, managing to direct this structure by entrusting him with the District General Secretariat during the 2006 presidential campaign of Lourdes Flores, in addition to the role of National Secretary for Electoral Affairs.

Subsequently, Beingolea served as campaign manager for the 2006 regional and municipal elections.

=== 2011 general elections ===
Following his stint as campaign manager in the 2010 regional and municipal elections, he was selected to integrate the list of candidates for Congress at the 2011 general election under the Alliance for the Great Change, receiving the number 10 on the list at his request. His campaign slogan was "The 10 enters the field". Elected with over a majority of 170,000 votes in the constituency of Lima, he was third most voted congressional candidate in the party's history.

=== Congressional term (2011–2016) ===
During his first year in Congress, he presided over the Justice Committee; in his second year, the special multiparty tribute commission for the centenary of the birth of Ernesto Alayza Grundy and Mario Polar Ugarteche; and in his third year he was elected spokesperson for the PPC-APP caucus.

At the end of his term, he announced he would not run for reelection in the 2016 general election, due to the coalition between the Christian People's Party and the Peruvian Aprista Party called the Popular Alliance, which launched former president Alan García as the presidential nominee, alongside Lourdes Flores as first running-mate. He made his decision public as he disagreed on the coalition.

=== Post-congressional term and party leadership election ===
On 15 December 2016, he suffered a car accident when he was riding in a car on Caminos del Inca Avenue, in the district of Surco. The car hit a public transport bus, which caused Beingolea to jump out of the vehicle, falling into the central berm, while the co-pilot, Roger Pingo (rector of the Señor de Sipán University), died on the spot. Beingolea was hospitalized and managed to recover from his injuries.

On 16 December 2017, Beingolea was elected President of the Christian People's Party, after defeating Javier Bedoya de Vivanco in the internal election. He recognized that his party was going through the most severe crisis in its history and that a party reengineering was necessary. He resigned on 15 April 2021, after the party was defeated in the 2021 general elections and failing to win seats in Congress.

=== 2018 Lima mayoral election ===
Beingolea was selected as the Christian People's Party's nominee for Mayor of Lima for the 2018 municipal elections. He ended up placing fourth in the election with 4.4% of the popular vote, losing to Jorge Muñoz, although he performed strongly in the debates against former mayor Ricardo Belmont.

Beingolea described the dissolution of the Congress of the Republic of Peru by President Martín Vizcarra in 2019 as a "coup d'etat".

=== 2021 presidential election ===
For the 2021 general election, Beingolea announced the establishment of National Unity, a party leadership roundtable of the Christian People's Party to analyze options if running in a coalition or independently in the elections. The roundtable managed to negotiate with a variety of political personalities and parties until reaching an agreement César Acuña of Alliance for Progress. The alliance was officially signed on 12 October 2020, but lasted only six days, upon the revelation of disconformity from PPC's leadership, most prominently from the party Secretary General, Marisol Pérez Tello, who rejected Acuña by stating "she would not support a plagiarizer". Illegal audios were revealed by the press, and the alliance broke off almost immediately.

Following the failed agreement with Alliance for Progress, Beingolea announced that he would run for the party's presidential nomination. He formally attained the nomination on 29 November 2020.

On Election Day, Beingolea won 2.0% of the popular vote, placing 12th.
