= Roberto Gomez =

Roberto Gómez or Roberto Gomez is the name of:

- Roberto Carlos Mario Gómez (born 1957), Argentine football manager and former football player
- Roberto Gómez Baca (born 1970), Peruvian lawyer and politician
- Roberto Gómez Bolaños (1929–2014), Mexican writer, actor, director
- Roberto Gómez Fernández (born 1964), Mexican producer, artist, actor and comedian
- Roberto Gómez Pérez (1889–1956), Chilean radical politician
- Roberto Gómez (baseball) (1989–2024), Dominican Republic baseball player
- Roberto Gomez (pool player) (born 1978), Filipino pocket billiards player
- Roberto Gómez (swimmer) (born 1988), Venezuelan swimmer
- Roberto Suárez Gómez (1932–2000), Bolivian drug trafficker
