= First the People (Peru) =

Political party in Peru

First The People – Community, Ecology, Liberty, and Progress Primero La Gente – Comunidad, Ecología, Libertad y Progreso
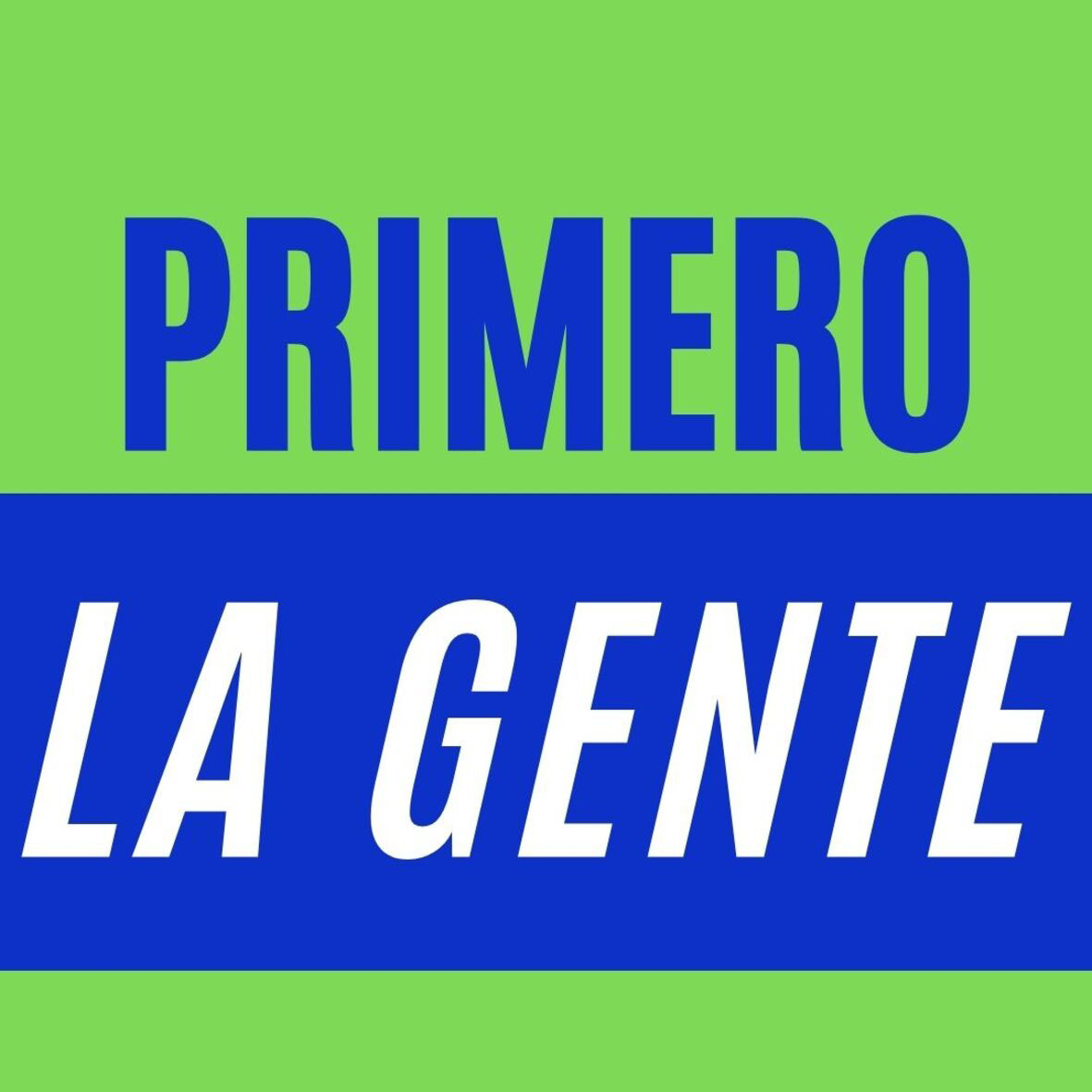
- Abbreviation: PLG
- Leader: Miguel del Castillo
- Founded: 13 September 2022
- Registered: 5 July 2023
- Headquarters: Pueblo Libre, Lima, Peru
- Ideology: Social liberalism Progressivism; Radical centrism
- Political position: Centre
- Colors: Green; Blue
- Congress of the Republic: 0 / 130

Website
- primerolagente.pe

First the People – Community, Ecology, Liberty, and Progress (Spanish: Primero La Gente – Comunidad, Ecología, Libertad y Progreso) is a political party in Peru. Led by a former presidential advisor to Pedro Castillo, Miguel del Castillo, the party obtained its registration at the National Jury of Elections in July 2023.

Among the party's notable members is LGBT activist and member of Congress Susel Paredes, who confirmed her desire to run for the Peruvian presidency in the next general election following her exit from the Purple Party in late 2022.

Less than year of the party's registration, numerous members opted to quit First the People, among them another associate of the Pedro Castillo administration, former Union for Peru member of Congress Roger Nájar, alleging that Miguel del Castillo refused to disassociate himself from the Peruvian Aprista Party based on the latter's family relationship to his father, Jorge del Castillo, a prominent member of said party.

In June 2024, First The People annexed Lo Justo por el Perú, following the latter's imminent failure to file for party registration on time, adding to its influx of members the likes of Marisol Pérez Tello, minister of Justice and Human Rights under president Pedro Pablo Kuczynski and member of Congress from 2011 to 2016, Flor Pablo, minister of Education under president Martín Vizcarra and member of Congress since 2021, and other national progressive figures associated with the Purple Party.

== Election results ==
=== Presidential ===
Election	Candidate	First round		Second round		Result
Election	Candidate	Votes	%	Votes	%	Result
2026	Marisol Pérez Tello	571,170	3.41			Lost ✗

=== Congressional ===
==== Chamber of Deputies ====
Election	Leader	Votes	%	Seats	+/–	Rank	Government
2026	Miguel del Castillo	434,740	3.01	0 / 130	New	▲8th	Extra-parliamentary

==== Senate ====
Election	Leader	Votes	%	Seats	+/–	Rank	Government
2026	Miguel del Castillo	524,212	3.54	0 / 60		▲8th	Extra-parliamentary

== See also ==
- Lo Justo por el Perú
- Purple Party
