= Jaime Bedoya Delboy =

Peruvian politician

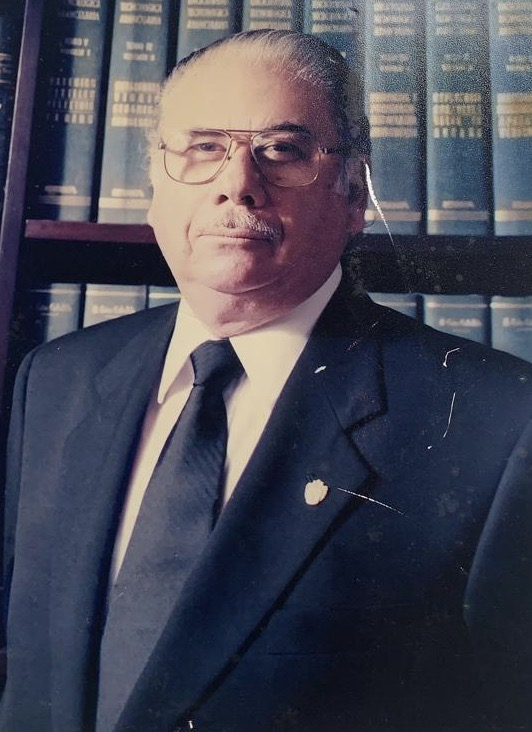
- Official councilman portrait

Member of the San Isidro District Council
- In office 1 January 1993 – 31 December 1998

Personal details
- Born: Jaime Juan Enrique Bedoya Delboy; 27 August 1930 Lima, Peru
- Died: 2012 (aged 81–82) Lima, Peru
- Party: Christian People's Party
- Spouse: Rosa María García Montero Luza
- Children: Maria del Rocío Bedoya García Montero; María Cecilia Bedoya García Montero; Jaime Bedoya García Montero; Juan Enrique Bedoya García Montero; Jorge Luis Bedoya García Montero
- Parents: Víctor Augusto Enrique Bedoya Montjoy (father); María Clementina Delboy Melgar (mother)
- Relatives: Luis Bedoya Reyes (cousin); Javier Bedoya de Vivanco (nephew); Javier Bedoya Denegri (grand-nephew)

Jaime Juan Enrique Bedoya Delboy (27 August 1930 – 2012) was a Peruvian businessman and politician who served as a member of the San Isidro District Council from 1993 to 1998. Affiliated to the Christian People's Party (PPC), he formed part of the prominent Bedoya political family, being the cousin of Luis Bedoya Reyes.
