= Osterling =

Osterling is a surname. Notable people with the surname include:

- Anders Österling (1884–1981), Swedish poet and writer
- Felipe Osterling (1932–2014), Peruvian lawyer, writer, and politician
- Frederick J. Osterling (1865–1934), American architect
