= Luis Bedoya Reyes =

Peruvian politician (1919–2021)

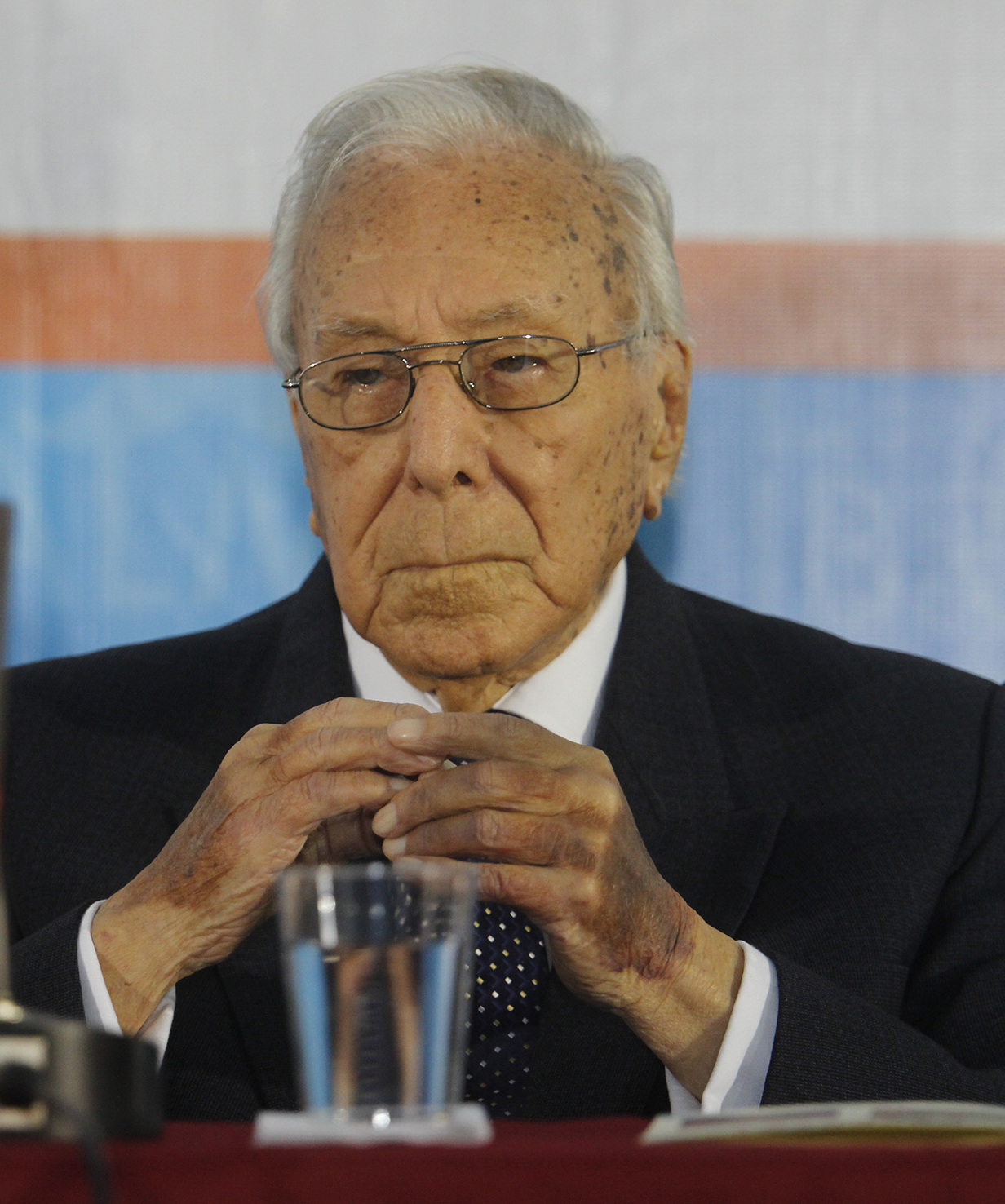
- Bedoya in 2019

Member of the Constituent Assembly
- In office 28 July 1978 – 26 July 1980
- Constituency: National

Mayor of Lima
- In office 1 January 1964 – 31 December 1969
- Preceded by: Anita Fernandini de Naranjo
- Succeeded by: Eduardo Dibós Chappuis

Minister of Justice and Worship of Peru
- In office 28 July 1963 – 31 December 1963
- President: Fernando Belaúnde
- Prime Minister: Julio Óscar Trelles Montes
- Preceded by: Juan Orrego Aguinaga
- Succeeded by: Emilio Llosa Ricketts

President of the Christian People's Party Founding President (Honorary Title)
- In office 18 December 1966 – 18 December 1999
- Preceded by: Party founded
- Succeeded by: Ántero Flores Aráoz (President)

Personal details
- Born: 20 February 1919 Callao, Peru
- Died: 18 March 2021 (aged 102) Lima, Peru
- Party: Christian People's Party
- Spouse: María Laura de Vivanco Sotomayor
- Children: Laura Bedoya de Vivanco; Rosario Bedoya de Vivanco; Luis Bedoya de Vivanco; Javier Bedoya de Vivanco; Pedro Antonio Bedoya de Vivanco; Marisol Bedoya de Vivanco; Roxana Bedoya de Vivanco
- Parents: Jacinto Bedoya Falconí (father); Luz Reyes de la Torre (mother)
- Relatives: Javier Bedoya Denegri (grandson); Jaime Bedoya Delboy (cousin); Santiago Bedoya Pardo (grand-nephew)

Luis Fernán Bedoya Reyes (20 February 1919 – 18 March 2021) was a Peruvian Christian Democrat (PDC) and Christian People's Party (PPC) politician who served as the Mayor of Lima from 1964 to 1969. He was also a Minister of Justice, member of the Peruvian Congress, and ran unsuccessfully for the Peruvian presidency two times. He was the founder of the Christian People's Party (PPC). He was the father of Javier Bedoya, a former congressman and deputy, and Luis Bedoya de Vivanco, former mayor of Miraflores.

== Biography ==
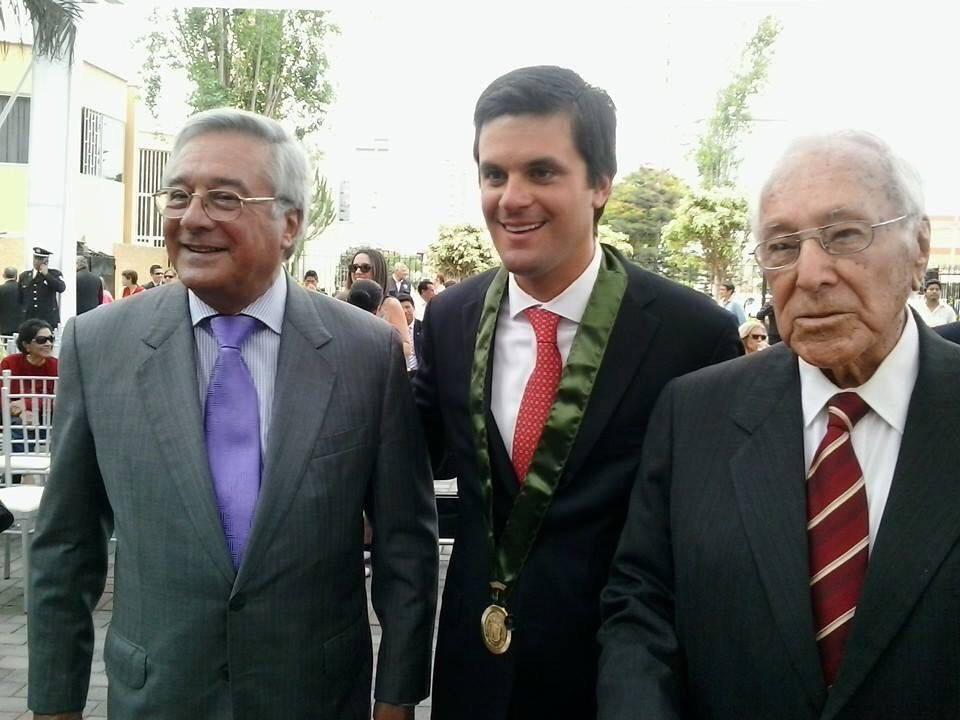
Bedoya (right) in 2015 with his son and his grandson.

He was born in Callao, on 20 February 1919, the son of Jacinto Bedoya Falconí and Luz Reyes de la Torre. He attended high school at the College of Our Lady of Guadalupe, where he stood out for his love of basketball.

He entered the Faculty of Letters of the Universidad Nacional Mayor de San Marcos with high qualifications, after which he went on to the Faculty of Law of the same university, a career in which he would graduate in 1942.

He married María Laura de Vivanco Sotomayor, with whom he had seven children: Luis Guillermo (†), Javier Alonso, Laura, María del Rosario, Pedro Antonio, Marisol (†) and Roxana. His son, Javier Bedoya de Vivanco was a Congressman of the Republic from 2006 to 2016, and his grandson, Javier Bedoya Denegri, was Lieutenant Mayor of San Isidro from 2015 to 2018.

Retired from politics since 1999, he served as counselor of the Bedoya Law Firm (Estudio Bedoya Abogados). He turned 100 in February 2019, and died in March 2021 at the age of 102.

== See also ==
- Christian People's Party (Peru)

Political offices
| Preceded by Anita Fernandini de Naranjo | Mayor of Lima 1964–1969 | Succeeded by Eduardo Dibós Chappuis |
