= Raúl Castro Stagnaro =

Peruvian politician

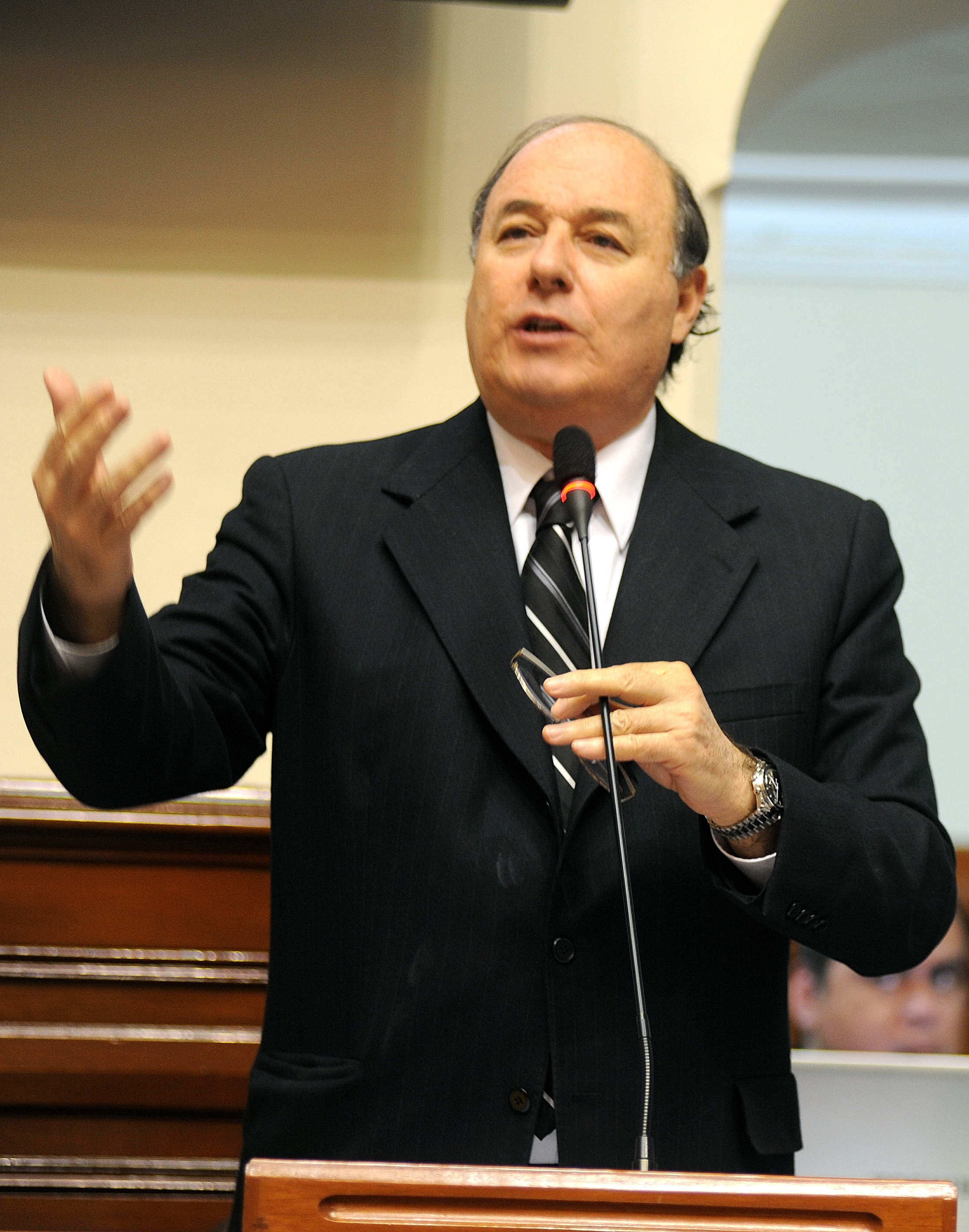
- Castro Stagnaro in 2010

Member of Congress
- In office 26 July 2006 – 26 July 2011
- Constituency: Lima

President of the Christian People's Party
- In office 19 November 2011 – December 2016
- Preceded by: Lourdes Flores
- Succeeded by: Alonso Alberto Navarro Cabanillas

Personal details
- Born: Raúl Eduardo Castro Stagnaro; 5 July 1952 (age 74) Lima, Peru
- Party: Christian People's Party
- Other political affiliations: Popular Alliance; National Unity
- Education: Pontifical Catholic University of Peru
- Occupation: Politician
- Profession: Lawyer

Raúl Eduardo Castro Stagnaro (born 5 July 1952) is a Peruvian lawyer and politician who is a former Congressman, representing Lima elected in the 2006 election under the National Unity list for the 2006–2011 term. In the 2016 election, Castro Stagnaro tried to run for Congress again in the Lima constituency, under the Popular Alliance under number 2 of the list, which grouped Alan García’s APRA, and the Christian People's Party, but he was not elected. In party level, he served as President of the Christian People's Party from 2011 and 2016. He was also its party Secretary General from 2006 and 2011 and as Vice President of the Party from 1999 to 2006.

== Biography ==
=== Education ===
Raúl Castro Stagnaro studied at the Antonio Raimondi Italian School (Lima). His university studies were carried out at the Pontifical Catholic University of Peru, where he studied Law and Political Science.

He is the director of the Castro Stagnaro & Association Law Firm.

=== Political career ===
==== Congressman ====
Castro Stagnaro is former Congressman, representing Lima, elected in the 2006 election under the National Unity list for the 2006–2011 term.

==== Post-congressional career ====
In the 2016 election, Castro Stagnaro tried to run for Congress again in the Lima constituency, under the Popular Alliance under number 2 of the list, which grouped Alan García’s APRA, and the Christian People's Party, but he was not elected.

==== Party politics ====
In party level, he served as President of the Christian People's Party from 2011 to 2016. He was also its party secretary general from 2006 and 2011 and as Vice President of the Party from 1999 to 2006.
