= Javier Bedoya Denegri =

Peruvian politician

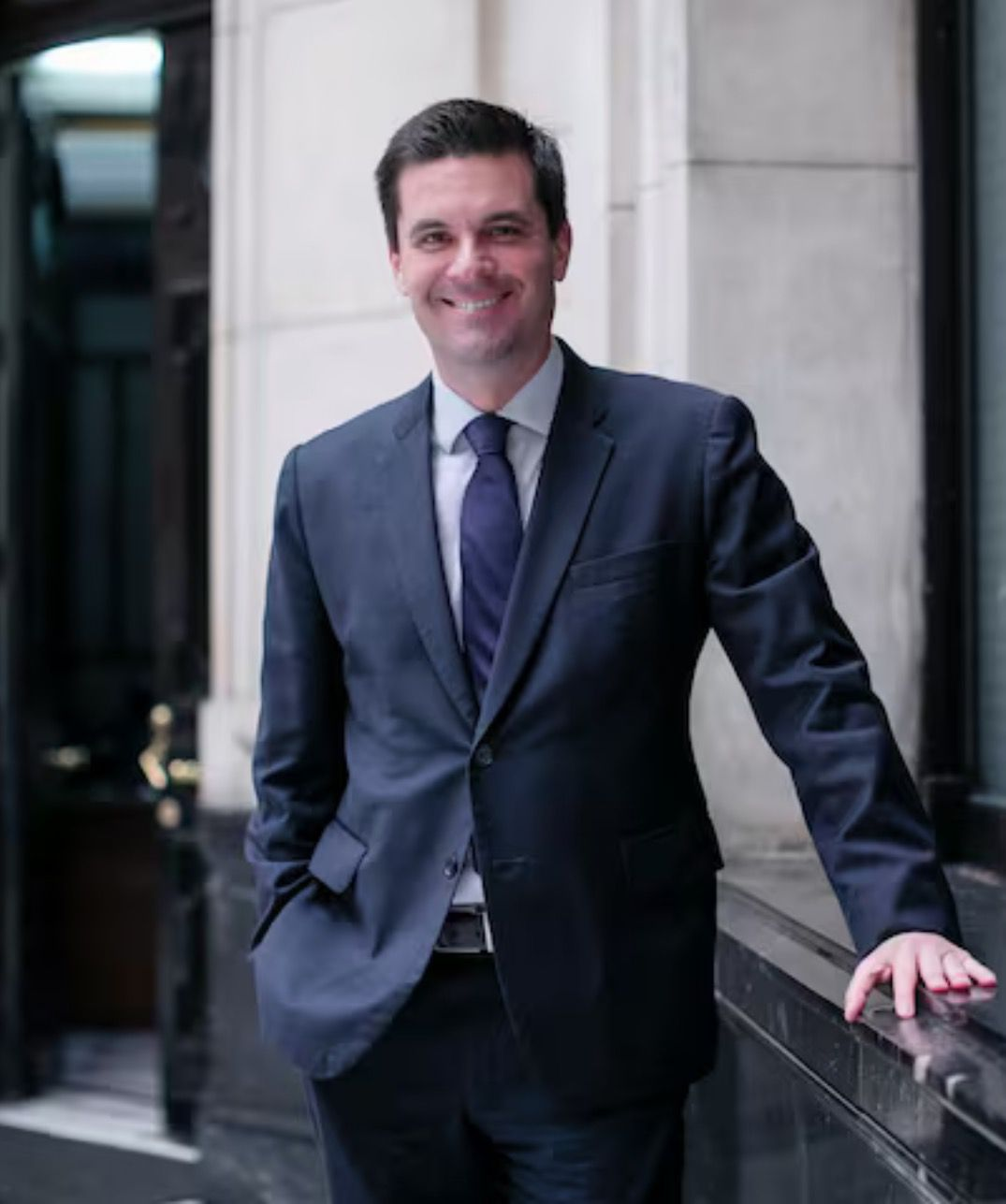

General Secretary of the Christian People's Party
- Incumbent
- Assumed office 27 August 2023
- President: Carlos Neuhaus
- Preceded by: Marisol Pérez Tello

Lieutenant Mayor of the San Isidro District
- In office 1 January 2015 – 31 December 2018
- Preceded by: Magdalena de Monzarz Stier
- Succeeded by: Patricia Lazo del Carpio

Personal details
- Born: Javier Ignacio Bedoya Denegri; 14 November 1980 (age 45) Lima, Peru
- Party: Christian People's Party (2005–present)
- Parents: Javier Bedoya de Vivanco (father); Norma Denegri Ponce de León (mother)
- Relatives: Luis Bedoya Reyes (grandfather); Jaime Bedoya Delboy (grand-uncle); Santiago Bedoya Pardo (cousin)
- Education: University of Lima (LLB); Duke University (LLM)

Javier Ignacio Bedoya Denegri (born 14 November 1980) is a Peruvian attorney and politician. Affiliated to the Christian People's Party (PPC), he is the son of former congressman Javier Bedoya de Vivanco and grandson of the party's founder, Luis Bedoya Reyes.

A law graduate from the University of Lima with a master's degree from Duke University School of Law, Bedoya Denegri served as lieutenant mayor of the San Isidro District from 2015 to 2018 under Manuel Velarde's mayorship.

Bedoya Denegri is a signatory of the Madrid Charter, an anti-communist manifesto alongside a variety of right-wing individuals from Spain and the Americas.

== See also ==
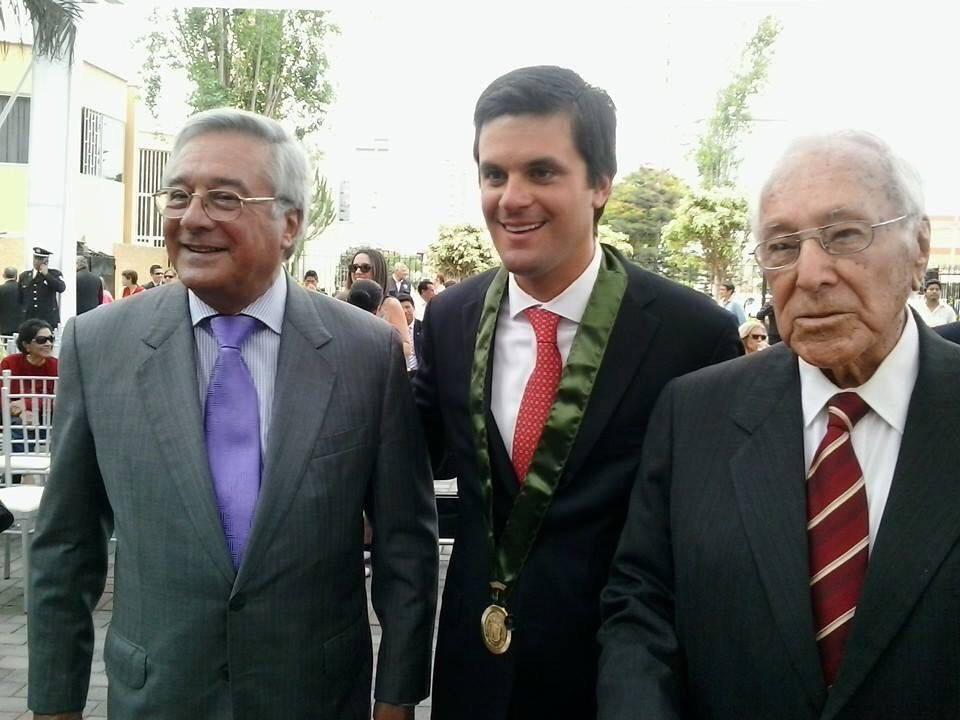
Bedoya (centre) in 2015 with his father and his grandfather.

- Christian People's Party (Peru)
