= Lo Justo por el Perú =

The Just for Peru Lo Justo por el Perú
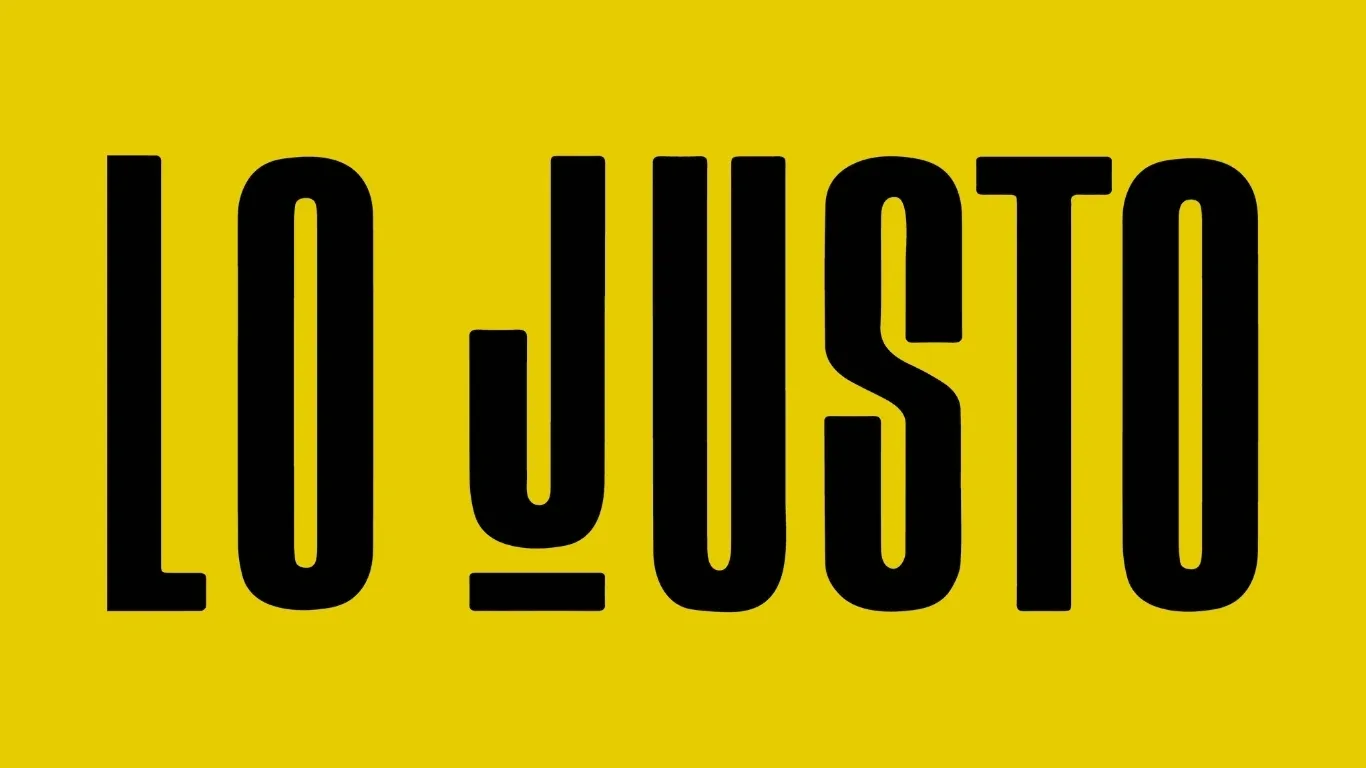
- Abbreviation: Lo Justo
- Leaders: Marisol Pérez Tello; Flor Pablo
- Founded: 13 March 2024
- Dissolved: 18 June 2024
- Split from: Purple Party
- Succeeded by: First The People – Community, Ecology, Liberty, and Progress
- Ideology: Radical centrism Social liberalism Progressivism
- Political position: Centre
- Colours: Yellow; Black

Website
- lojusto.org

Lo Justo por el Perú (also known simply as Lo Justo, lit. 'The Just for Peru') was a brief radical centrist political party in Peru. In order to participate of the 2026 general election, it was annexed by First The People – Community, Ecology, Liberty, and Progress on 18 June 2024 as the party’s apparatus desisted of registering at the National Jury of Elections based on the limited time to complete the process before the deadline on 12 July 2024.

The main party initiators were former ministers Marisol Pérez Tello and Flor Pablo.

== History ==
The Lo Justo party emerged in early 2024 as a faction of the Purple Party opposed to party president Luis Durán, who reorganized the party to the detriment of the party's communications wing that had supported Julio Guzmán's presidential campaign in the 2021 presidential election. Following the failure of Guillermo Flores' candidacy for mayor of Lima due to documentary errors, Flor Pablo proposed relaunching the party with another name and logo, because Guzmán had registered the trademark with INDECOPI and refused to give it up. By the end of 2023, Pablo, along with Marisol Pérez Tello, Eduardo Dargent and Daniel Olivares, began talks to form a new party if they failed to change the name and logo of the Purple Party. On 10 January 2024, Pablo sent a letter to Durán urging him to change the name and logo of the Purple Party. On 18 January, José Luis Márquez Molina, Pérez Tello's adviser, put forward Lo Justo's name before the National Jury of Elections (JNE). On 2 February, Pablo resigns from the Purple Party; on 14 February, Olivares would do the same; launching the Lo Justo party. Alberto de Belaúnde and Gino Costa also joined Lo Justo party.

Pablo and Pérez Tello mentioned that they sought to be a decentralized party, adding to its influx of members the likes of former governor of Cuzco, Jean Paul Benavente, among other regional officials.

=== Demise and annexation by First The People ===
By June 2024, Lo Justo’s leaders realized the party would not be able to register at the National Jury of Elections on time before the 12 July 2024 deadline, desisting of continuing the process and exploring possible parties to integrate. Following People's Liberty rejection, they reached an agreement with First The People – Community, Ecology, Liberty, and Progress to fully integrate Lo Justo into their party in order to not lose the opportunity of participating of the 2026 election.
