= Javier Bedoya de Vivanco =

Peruvian lawyer and politician

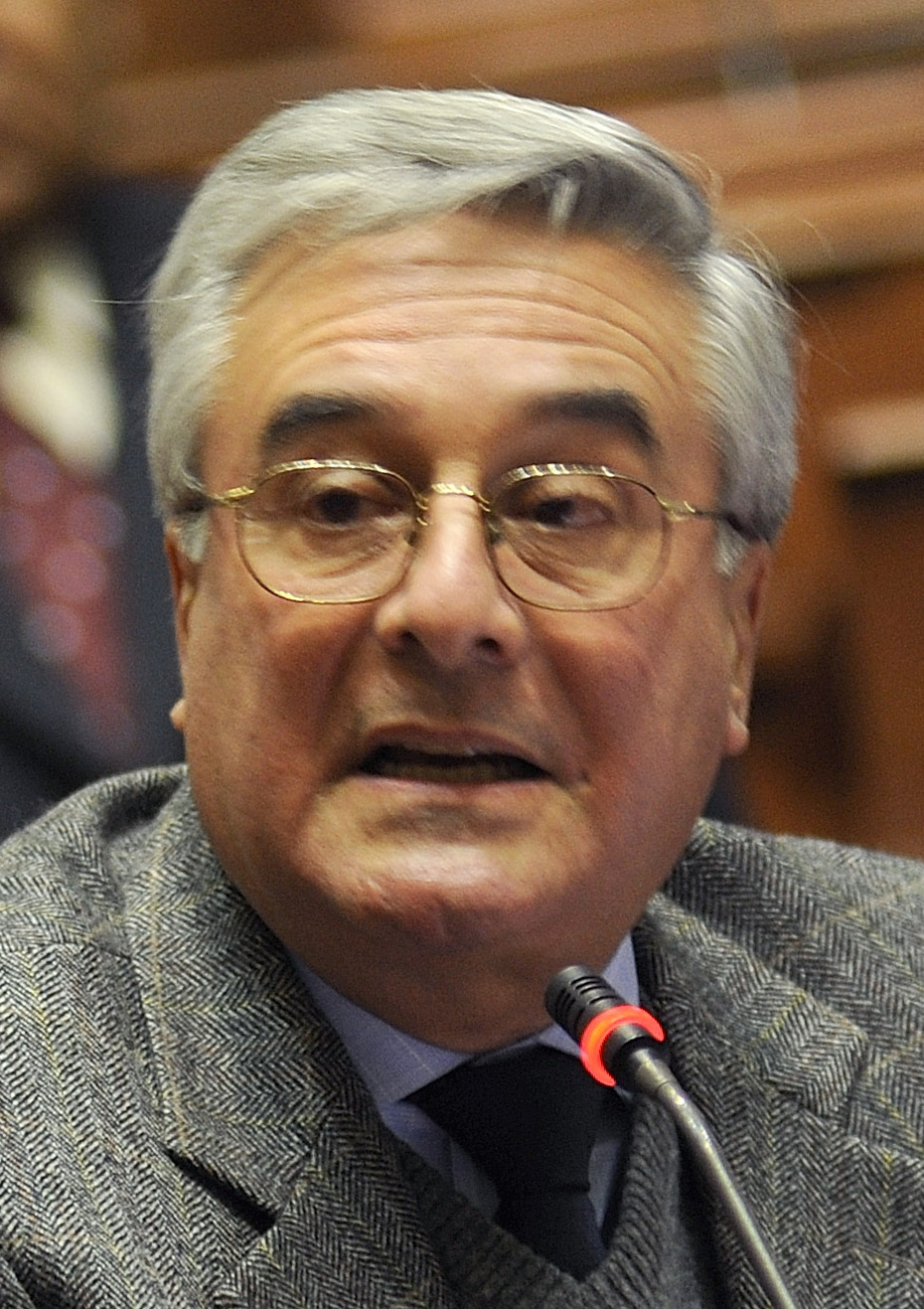

Member of Congress
- In office 26 July 2006 – 26 July 2016
- Constituency: Lima

Member of the Chamber of Deputies
- In office 26 July 1985 – 5 April 1992
- Constituency: Lima

Member of the Lima Metropolitan Council
- In office 1 January 1981 – 31 December 1983

Personal details
- Born: Javier Alonso Bedoya de Vivanco; 23 September 1948 (age 77) Lima, Peru
- Party: Christian People's Party (1978–present)
- Spouse: Norma Denegri Ponce de León
- Children: Mónica Bedoya Denegri; Javier Bedoya Denegri; Carolina Bedoya Denegri; Alonso Bedoya Denegri
- Parents: Luis Bedoya Reyes (father); María Laura de Vivanco Sotomayor (mother)
- Relatives: Luis Bedoya de Vivanco (brother); Jaime Bedoya Delboy (uncle); Santiago Bedoya Pardo (nephew)
- Education: Pontifical Catholic University of Peru (LLB)
- Profession: Lawyer

Javier Alonso Bedoya de Vivanco (born 23 September 1948) is a Peruvian lawyer and politician (PPC) and a former Congressman representing Lima between 2006 and 2016.

== Early life ==
Born in Lima on 23 September 1948 to Luis Bedoya Reyes. His father, Luis is the founder of the Christian People's Party and was Mayor of Lima, member of the lower house of the Peruvian Congress and Minister of Justice, among others. He is a member of the Bedoya family, often compared in Peru with the Kennedy family because of its extensive and continuous commitment to public service.

== Career ==
Bedoya is also a lawyer who is partner of Bedoya Law Firm (Estudio Bedoya Abogados). Bedoya Law Firm has attorneys with a wide experience in the provision of corporate counseling services in Civil, Trade, Financial, Industrial Property, Tax and Labor Law, Commercial, Constitutional, Administrative, Civil Procedural and Municipal Law.

== Political career ==
=== Early political career ===
Bedoya's first political office was councilor of Lima from 1980 to 1983. From 1983 to 1986 Bedoya acted as the sub-secretary of the Lima Province-PPC.

=== Congressional career ===
==== Deputy ====
In the 1985 election, he was elected to the Chamber of Deputies under the Democratic Convergence alliance and in the 1990 election, he was re-elected for a second term, this time under the FREDEMO list, his term ended when the Congress was dissolved in 1992 due to President Alberto Fujimori's self-coup. In 1989, he was also promoted to Secretary General on the national level of his party, a position he held until 1992 as well.

==== Congressman ====
In the 2006 election he was elected to the now unicameral Congress on the National Unity list for the 2006–11 term. In the 2011 election he was re-elected on the ticket of the Alliance for the Great Change to which the Christian Democrats now belong. In the 2016 election, he ran for re-election under the Popular Alliance which group the Christian Democrats and the Peruvian Aprista Party, but lost his seat. He ran for the Presidency of Congress in 2014, but lost to Ana María Solórzano.
