= Enrique Cornejo =

Peruvian politician

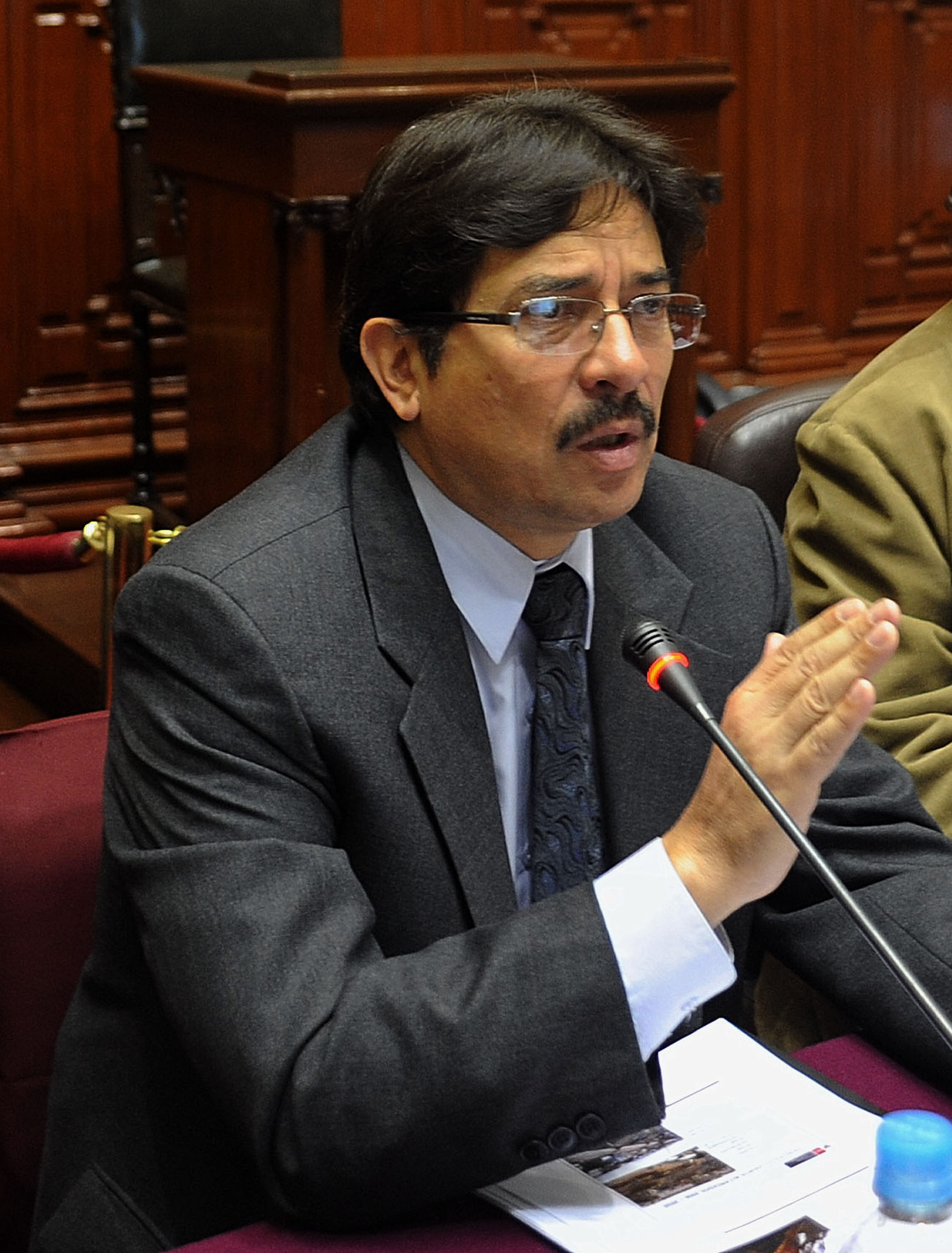

Minister of Transport and Communications
- In office 29 November 2008 – 28 July 2011
- President: Alan García
- Preceded by: Verónica Zavala
- Succeeded by: Carlos Paredes

Minister of Housing, Construction and Sanitation
- In office 20 December 2007 – 29 November 2008
- President: Alan García
- Preceded by: Hernán Garrido Lecca
- Succeeded by: Nidia Vílchez

Secretary General of the Presidency
- In office 28 July 1985 – 30 September 1986
- President: Alan García
- Preceded by: Óscar Maúrtua

Personal details
- Born: June 2, 1956 (age 70) Lima, Peru
- Party: Independent (2017-present)
- Other political affiliations: Direct Democracy (2018); APRA (until 2017)
- Education: University of Lima
- Profession: Politician and economist

Enrique Javier Cornejo Ramirez (born 2 June 1956) is a Peruvian politician who was the former Minister of Transportation and Communications that was under President Alan García from September 2010 to July 2011. Prior to that, he was the Minister of Housing and Construction.

== Biography ==
Enrique Cornejo graduated from the University of Lima. He has taught at universities in Ecuador and Bolivia. He also taught at the Pontificia Universidad Católica del Perú. From August 2006 to December 2007, he was the CEO of the National Bank of Peru. In 2007, he was appointed the Peruvian Minister of Housing and Construction. In September 2010, he became the Minister of Transportation and Communication.

=== Candidacy for Mayor of Lima ===
In the 2014 municipal elections, he ran for Mayor of Lima under the Peruvian Aprista Party, but lost to Luis Castañeda Lossio. In April 2017, he announced that he would run again for mayor for the municipal elections of Lima in 2018, founding a provincial organization "Contigo Ciudadano" after his resignation from the Peruvian Aprista Party in March of the same year. By failing to meet the signature requirement, he formed an alliance with the Direct Democracy Party, sealing his candidacy for 2018.

=== Arrest ===
On 17 April 2019, the Peruvian judiciary ordered preliminary detention against him and other investigators, for having received alleged bribes from the Odebrecht company. Subsequently, the former Minister of Transport was detained by the police as he was leaving a media outlet building.
