= Marisol Pérez Tello =

Peruvian lawyer and politician

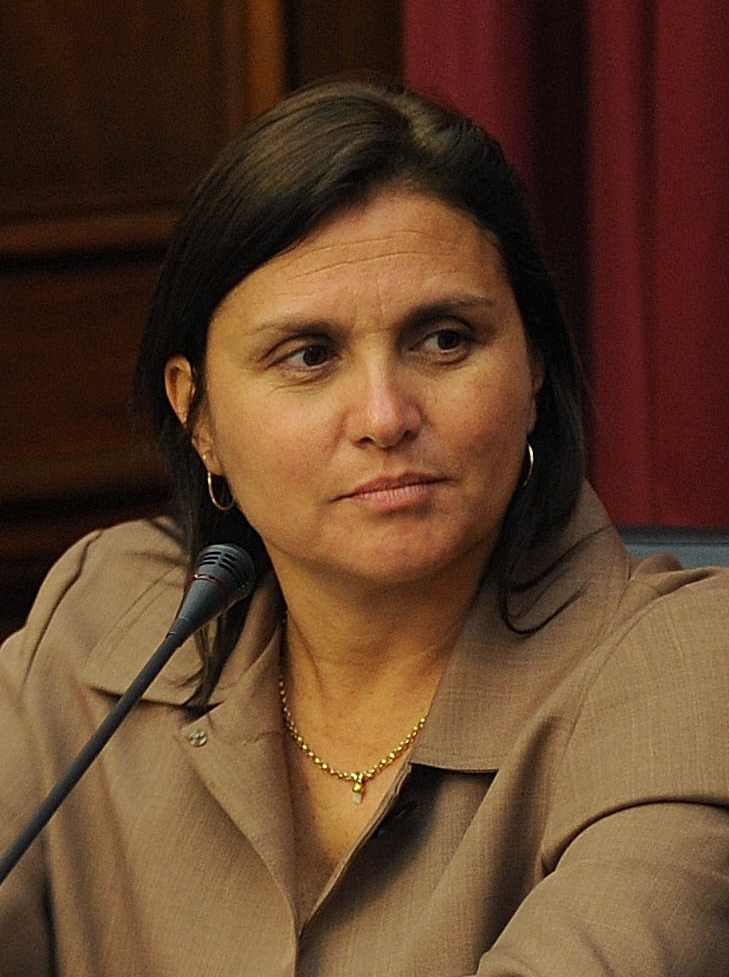

Minister of Justice and Human Rights
- In office 28 July 2016 – 17 September 2017
- President: Pedro Pablo Kuczynski
- Prime Minister: Fernando Zavala
- Preceded by: Aldo Vásquez
- Succeeded by: Enrique Mendoza

Member of Congress
- In office 26 July 2011 – 26 July 2016
- Constituency: Lima

General Secretary of the Christian People's Party
- In office 16 December 2017 – 7 September 2021
- President: Alberto Beingolea
- Preceded by: Rafael Yamashiro
- Succeeded by: Javier Bedoya Denegri; Claudia Chirinos; Matilde Lozado

Personal details
- Born: April 11, 1969 (age 57) Jorge Basadre, Tacna, Peru
- Party: First The People – Community, Ecology, Liberty, and Progress (since 2024); Lo Justo por el Perú (since 2024)
- Other political affiliations: Independent (2022–2024); Christian People's Party (1987–2022)
- Spouse: José Luis Rodríguez
- Education: University of San Martín de Porres (LLB, PhD); Pontifical Catholic University of Peru (LLM)
- Occupation: Lawyer; Politician

María Soledad Pérez Tello de Rodríguez (born April 11, 1969) is a Peruvian lawyer, notary and politician. A former member of the Christian People's Party, she served as its general secretary from 2017 until her departure in 2022. She currently leads Lo Justo por el Perú, a self-described radical centrist party alongside Flor Pablo, annexed to First The People – Community, Ecology, Liberty, and Progress.

Born in the southern region of Tacna, Pérez Tello pursued a law degree at the University of San Martín de Porres, graduating with honors. Subsequently, she started off in her career as public notary, specializing in Human Rights defense. She later attained a master's degree in constitutional law at the Pontifical Catholic University of Peru, and a doctorate in law from her first school. At the same time, she became heavily involved in the ranks of the Christian People's Party, running unsuccessfully for the Peruvian Congress in 2006, and for the Lima City Council in 2010.

At the 2011 general election, Pérez Tello was selected as Pedro Pablo Kuczynski's second running mate in the Alliance for the Great Change coalition ticket, which included her party. The ticket ultimately placed third in the election, but Pérez Tello was elected to Congress representing the Lima constituency. In her five-year tenure, she took a strong leadership role in the Christian democrat caucus as part of key congressional committees, mainly the Committee on Justice and Human Rights. She decided against running for reelection in 2016 at the conclusion of her term, in part due to her party running allied with the social democrat Peruvian Aprista Party, which she did not approve.

During the first part of the presidency of Pedro Pablo Kuczynski, Pérez Tello served as Minister of Justice and Human Rights, from July 2016 to September 2017. In her tenure, she championed several structural reforms for the National Penitentiary Institute, and paved way for the National Agreement for Justice, an accord between key Peruvian justice agencies to provide accountability and strengthen the national justice system.

== Early life and education ==
Marisol Pérez Tello was born in the Jorge Basadre Province of Tacna, on April 11, 1969. She migrated to Lima with her family, where she attended the Regina Pacis School.

Upon finishing her high school education, Pérez Tello was admitted to the University of San Martín de Porres. Pursuing a law degree, she graduated with honors in 1995. Subsequently, she enrolled in the Pontifical Catholic University of Peru, attaining a master's degree in constitutional law in 2000. She also obtained a diploma in Human Rights at the Complutense University of Madrid and in Environment at the Polytechnic University of Madrid. She concluded her graduate studies with a PhD in law from University of San Martín de Porres.

== Career ==
Pérez Tello started as a public notary in 1999. In the field of education, she served as law professor at the University of San Martín de Porres, specializing in Human Rights. Since 2000, she serves as President of the Center for Human Rights from the same university.

In 1987, Pérez Tello joined the Christian People's Party. She was selected to run for the Peruvian Congress with National Unity, representing her party in the coalition for the Lima constituency, at the 2006 general election. Although she was not elected, she gained recognition for her strong campaigning and her youth. In 2007, she was appointed the party's National Structural Secretary for Training, serving in Lourdes Flores leadership through 2011. Pérez Tello unsuccessfully ran for the Lima City Council in 2010, as party leader Flores was defeated by the leftist nominee, Susana Villarán, in the mayorship race. The Christian People's Party only attained 11 council members.

=== 2011 vice presidential nomination ===
For the 2011 general election, former Prime Minister of Peru, Pedro Pablo Kuczynski sealed the Alliance for the Great Change coalition, composed by the Christian People's Party, Alliance for Progress, National Restoration, and the Peruvian Humanist Party. In December 2010, Pérez Tello was nominated by her party as Kuczynski's second running-mate in the coalition, alongside the non-partisan former vice president, Máximo San Román, as first running mate.

The coalition ran a strong campaign, but failed to qualify for the run-off, placing third behind Keiko Fujimori and Ollanta Humala. The latter would ultimately be elected to the presidency in the run-off. In total, Kuczynski's ticket with San Román and Pérez Tello earned 18.5% of the popular vote. Simultaneously, Pérez Tello was elected to the Peruvian Congress alongside twelve other coalition candidates.

=== Congressional term (2011–2016) ===
Pérez Tello was sworn in as a member of Congress on July 26, 2011. In the first half of there five-year term, she served in the Sub-Committee on Constitutional Accusations (2011–2014, 2015–2016), the Committees on Constitution and Rule (2011–2013), on Women and Family (2011–2016), and on Justice and Human Rights (2011–2013), being chair for the latter from 2012 to 2013. In the second half of her term, she served as Vice Chair of the Foreign Relations Committee (2013–2016).

At the end of her term, she decided against running for reelection in the 2016 general election, due to the coalition between the Christian People's Party and the Peruvian Aprista Party, which launched former president Alan García as the presidential nominee, alongside Lourdes Flores as first running-mate. She made her decision public on social media, wishing the best of luck for her party in the coalition and declaring her commitment to finishing her term without any distraction of sort.

=== Minister of Justice and Human Rights (2016–2017) ===
On July 15, 2016, President-elect Pedro Pablo Kuczynski announced Pérez Tello inclusion in his first cabinet as Minister of Justice and Human Rights. She took office on inauguration day, on July 28, 2016.

During her tenure, the National Agreement for Justice was created, a space for dialogue between the Judiciary, the Public Ministry, the National Council of the Magistrature, and the Academy of the Magistrature, to strengthen the justice system at the national level. At the same time, measures were implemented to modernize the National Penitentiary Institute of Peru, to reduce the levels of overcrowding in prisons and reduce the costs of internment.

On September 17, 2017, Pérez Tello tendered her resignation alongside the entire cabinet, as Prime Minister Fernando Zavala's vote of confidence was not approved by the fujimorist-dominated Peruvian Congress led by the Popular Force.
