= Roberto Gómez Baca =

Peruvian lawyer and politician

Roberto Hipólito Gómez Baca (Lima, November 29, 1970) is a Peruvian lawyer and politician. He was mayor of the district of Santiago de Surco during the years 2011 to 2018. He is currently a councilor of Santiago de Surco for the period 2023-2026.

== Early life and education ==
Gómez Baca studied law at the Pontifical Catholic University of Peru, graduating in 2001.

He served as the director general of transport in the Ministry of Transport and Communications, between 2009 and 2010. Additionally, he worked as a municipal official in the commune of Surco, from 1996 to 2002.

In 2013, his relationship with former model and then-councilwoman of Santiago de Surco, Mariella Zanetti, was confirmed, but they separated sometime later. He is currently married to Katherine Polar.

== Political career ==
He began his political journey in the 2002 municipal elections, running for councilor of Santiago de Surco as a representative of the Somos Perú party and securing re-election in 2006. During the 2006 Peruvian general elections, he campaigned for a congressional seat representing the Resurgimiento Peruano party, but was not elected.

During the 2010 municipal elections, he was elected mayor of Santiago de Surco as a candidate for Somos Perú, receiving 31.50% of the votes. He was reelected in 2014 with 34.36% of the votes.

In the 2018 municipal elections, he ran for mayor of Lima under the Vamos Perú party but received only 0.67% of the votes and was not elected. Following this, in the municipal elections of 2022, he ran as councilor for Santiago de Surco representing Avanza País, and was successfully elected.
