= Flor Pablo =

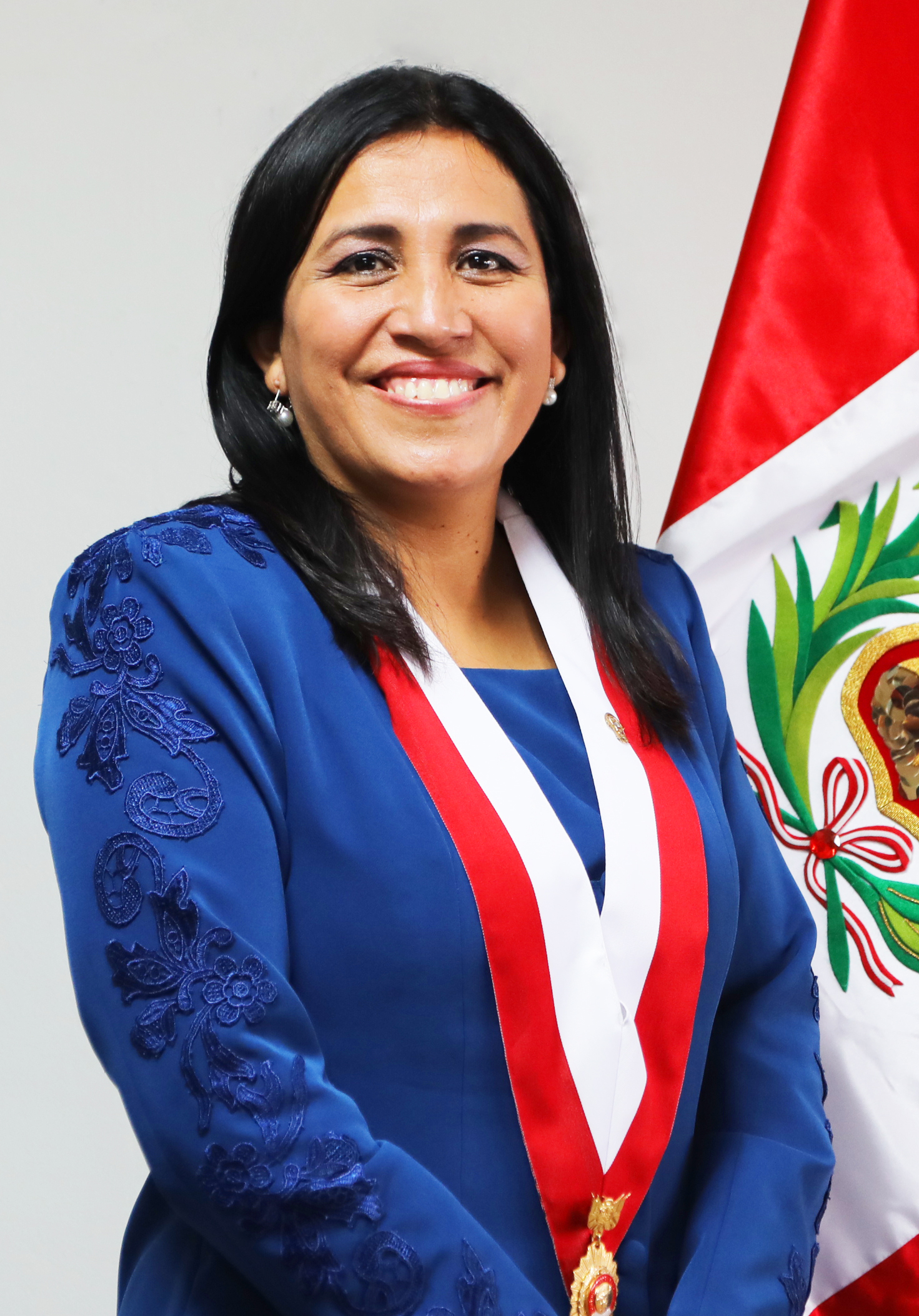
- Flor Pablo in 2021

Member of Congress
- Incumbent
- Assumed office 26 July 2021
- Constituency: Lima

Minister of Education
- In office 11 March 2019 – 13 February 2020
- President: Martín Vizcarra
- Prime Minister: Salvador del Solar; Vicente Zeballos
- Preceded by: Daniel Alfaro
- Succeeded by: Martin Benavides

Personal details
- Born: Flor Aideé Pablo Medina; 20 September 1974 (age 52) San Marcos, Ancash Region, Peru
- Party: Independent (2025–present)
- Other political affiliations: First The People – Community, Ecology, Liberty, and Progress (2024–2025); Lo Justo por el Perú (2024); Purple Party (2020–2024)
- Education: National University of San Marcos
- Profession: Teacher

Flor Aideé Pablo Medina (born 20 September 1974) is a Peruvian teacher, educator, and politician. She is currently a member of Congress since 2021. A former member of the Purple Party, she ran as Julio Guzmán's running-mate in the 2021 general election.

== Biography ==
Flor Pablo Medina was born in the town of San Marcos, in the Huari Province, in the Ancash Region of Peru. At the age of 6 she and her family moved to Lima, the capital of the country. Growing up she studied at the Presentation of María Educational Institute, a women's parochial college located in the Comas District.

She earned her undergraduate degree from the National University of San Marcos, with a specialty in language and literature. Pablo Medina also has completed postgraduate studies in management and public programs.

In the public sector, she held the position of national director of Primary Education in the Ministry of Education, during the administration of educational minister Patricia Salas, in the government of Ollanta Humala.

In July 2014, she was appointed the regional director of education for Metropolitan Lima.

In 2018 she worked as head of the technical team of the National Education Council, and at the beginning of 2019 as she was appointed executive secretary of the Peruvian National Education Council.

On 11 March 2019 Pablo Medina was sworn in as Minister of Education of the Peru of the government of President Martin Vizcarra, replacing Daniel Alfaro Paredes.

From March 2024 to January 2025, she led Lo Justo por el Perú alongside Marisol Pérez Tello, party that was annexed by First The People – Community, Ecology, Liberty, and Progress in June 2024 in order to participate in the 2026 general election. She resigned from First The People on 20 January 2025, in protest of a party member being named attaché to the Peruvian Embassy in Spain by the incumbent Boluarte administration.
