= Julio Gagó =

Peruvian politician (born 1961)

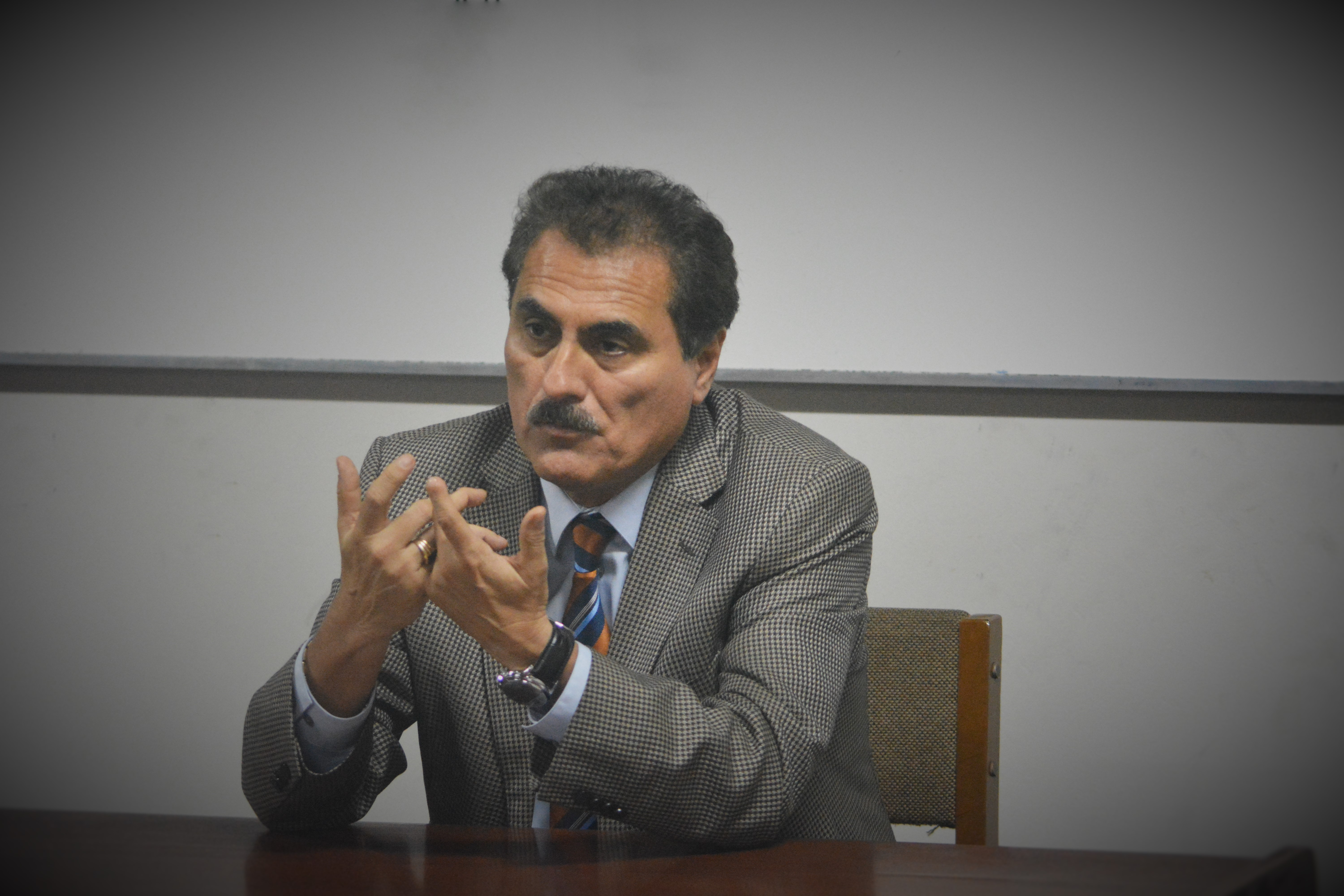

Member of the Lima Metropolitan Council
- Incumbent
- Assumed office 1 January 2023
- Preceded by: Gloria González

Member of Congress
- In office July 26, 2011 – July 26, 2016
- Constituency: Lima

Personal details
- Born: Julio César Gagó Pérez; 6 January 1961 (age 65) Lima, Peru
- Party: Popular Renewal (2021-present)
- Other political affiliations: Independent (2008-2021); Sí Cumple (2005-2008); National Justice Party (2004-2005)
- Education: Pontifical Catholic University of Peru (LLB)
- Occupation: Politician, Businessman
- Profession: Lawyer

Julio César Gagó Pérez (born January 6, 1961) is a Peruvian lawyer, businessman, and politician. He served in the Peruvian Congress representing Lima from 2011 to 2016.

== Early life and education ==
Gagó attained a law degree from the Pontifical Catholic University of Peru. He holds a certificate in Power Structure from the International Agency for Governance and Politics. He is also certified in Strategic Management by the Wharton School of the University of Pennsylvania.

== Political career ==
In 2005, he served as National Secretary of Press and Propaganda of the National Justice of Jaime Salinas. He eventually quit the party in 2005 and unsuccessfully ran for the Peruvian Congress at the 2006 general election with Alliance for the Future, a Fujimorist electoral alliance led by Keiko Fujimori.

In 2011, he was elected to Congress under the Fujimorist Force 2011, representing the constituency of Lima for the 2011–2016 term.

As a Fujimorist parliamentarian, Gagó supported the joint work of the legislative branch with the Humala administration. "We need everyone, especially the Legislative, to work with the Government".

During the 2014 period, Gagó was head of the Commissions for the Defense of the Consumer and Regulatory Bodies of Public Services.

From August 2015 to July 2016, Gagó served as head of the Ordinary Commission of Constitution and Regulation as well as of the Commissions of Inspection and Comptroller, of Justice and Human Rights and of Labor and Social Welfare.

Not seeking reelection to Congress at the 2016 general election, Gagó unsuccessfully ran for mayor of Lima under Go on Country - Social Integration Party at the 2018 Lima municipal election. He placed 17th in a heavily atomized race of 20 candidates by receiving 0.75% of the popular vote.

At the 2022 Lima municipal election, Gagó made a successful political comeback as a candidate for the Lima Metropolitan Council under Popular Renewal. He managed Rafael López Aliaga's campaign as the party placed first with 26.35% of the popular vote.

== Business career ==
Julio Gagó owns a photocopy business, JAAMSA, through which he sells Konica Minolta products in Peru. Its success led it to become a reference in the market.
