= Miguel del Castillo (politician) =

Peruvian lawyer and politician

Political Secretary of First The People – Community, Ecology, Liberty, and Progress
- Incumbent
- Assumed office 30 May 2023
- Preceded by: Office created

Personal details
- Born: Miguel Ángel del Castillo Reyes; 27 February 1976 (age 50) Lima, Peru
- Party: First The People – Community, Ecology, Liberty, and Progress (since 2022)
- Other political affiliations: Peruvian Aprista Party (until 2021)
- Parent(s): Jorge del Castillo; Flor de María Reyes
- Education: University of Lima (BBA)
- Occupation: Businessman

Miguel Ángel del Castillo Reyes (born 27 February 1976) is a Peruvian administrator and politician. The eldest son of former Prime Minister of Peru Jorge del Castillo, he was a member of the Peruvian Aprista Party until his defection in 2021 following his association to president Pedro Castillo’s campaign and subsequent administration as presidential advisor. Professionally, he manages the Peruvian broadcasting network Nativa, from which he has been accused of fraud for not remunerating his staff.

At the 2014 regional and municipal election, Del Castillo ran for mayor of the district of Barranco, placing fifth in the race.

Since 2022, Del Castillo has been a founding member of the centrist First The People – Community, Ecology, Liberty, and Progress party, in which he currently serves as its political secretary.

== Electoral history ==
Year	Office	Type	Party	Main opponent	Party	Votes for Castillo				Result	Swing
Year	Office	Type	Party	Main opponent	Party	Total	%	P.	±%	Result	Swing
2014	Mayor of Barranco	Municipal	Peruvian Aprista Party	Antonio Mezarina	Alliance for Progress	2,877	8.30%	5th	N/A	Lost	N/A

== See also ==
- Susel Paredes
