= Anita Fernandini de Naranjo =

Peruvian heiress and politician

Ana María Fernandini Clotet de Naranjo (April 17, 1902 – September 20, 1982) was a Peruvian heiress and politician in the early 1960s. She was the mayor of Lima from 1963 to 1964, the first of two women to hold that position, the other being Susana Villarán.

== Biography ==
Fernandini was born in Lima to an upper-class family of Corsican descent. She was designated as the first female mayor of Lima on March 14, 1963, by the government of Nicolás Lindley López.

Her manor in San Isidro was sold to the Soviet government in 1970, becoming the country's embassy, later that of Russia.

Preceded by Héctor García Ribeyro	Mayor of Lima; 1963–1964	Succeeded by Luis Bedoya Reyes
