= Roger Nájar =

Peruvian politician (born 1956)

Roger Najar

Member of Congress
- In office 28 July 2006 – 27 July 2011
- Constituency: Ucayali

Personal details
- Born: 26 September 1956 (age 69) Pucallpa, Ucayali, Peru

Roger Najar Kokally (born 26 September 1956) is a Peruvian politician and a former Congressman representing Ucayali in the 2006–2011 term.

== Biography ==
=== Early life, education and career ===
He was born in Pucallpa, Ucayali on September 26, 1956. He studied primary and secondary school in his hometown. He is a small businessman. He founded the NGO “Amazonía Siempre verde”, he is also co-founder of CGTP Ucayali.

In 1975 he began economics studies at the Inca Garcilaso de la Vega University, a career that he put aside in 1978.

=== Political career ===
In the regional elections of 2002 he ran as a candidate for regional councilor for We Are Peru without winning the election.

He was elected congressman for Ucayali in 2006 as a member of the Union for Peru during the second government of Alan García Pérez. He ran for reelection as a congressman in the 2016 elections without obtaining success.

In the regional elections of 2018, Najar ran as a candidate of Peru Libertario for regional governor of Ucayali, winning ninth place.

He was coordinator of the "Bicentennial Plan" of the Free Peru party during the 2021 general elections.
