= Diethell Columbus =

Member of the Chamber of Deputies
- Incumbent
- Assumed office 26 July 2026
- Constituency: Lima

Member of Congress
- In office March 16, 2020 – July 26, 2021
- Constituency: Lima

Personal details
- Born: Diethell Columbus Murata; 19 March 1981 (age 45) Lima, Peru
- Party: Popular Force

Diethell Columbus Murata (born March 19, 1981) is a Peruvian lawyer, university professor and Fujimorist politician. Currently, he is a Congressman representing Lima as of March 16, 2020. In 2018, he ran an unsuccessful campaign for Mayor of Lima.

== Biography ==
He completed his school studies at the San Antonio de Padua and San Francisco Solano de Lima schools. Before entering the University he studied Advertising Graphic Design.

In 1999, he began his studies at the Federico Villarreal National University, where he studied Law and obtained the professional title of lawyer. He studied Administration and Public Management at the Center for Higher National Studies, Governance and Political Management at the Pontifical Catholic University of Peru and Master's studies in Conflict Resolution at the University of San Martín de Porres.

== Political career ==
=== Early political career ===
He began his activities as a public servant in 2002 in the San Isidro District Municipality of the capital of the Republic of Peru.

When he was 26 years old, he assumed, for the first time, a position as Public Manager in the District Municipality of Pueblo Libre of the capital of the Republic of Peru, holding the managerial positions of Manager of Legal Advice, Municipal Public Prosecutor and Secretary General.

Upon returning to the District Municipality of San Isidro in the capital of the Republic of Peru, he served as General Secretary, Mayor's Advisor, Legal Advisory Manager (e) and finally as Municipal Manager. In 2015 he went to work in the Municipality of Jesús María in the capital of the Republic of Peru, serving as Mayor's Office Advisor, General Secretary, Legal Advisory Manager and finally as Municipal Manager.

At the end of 2017, he resigned from his municipal duties and assumed the position of principal advisor to the OECD Commission of the Congress of Peru. In 2019, he assumed functions as an advisor to the Presidency of the Andean Parliament.

He has served as a teacher at the Faculty of Law of the University of San Martín de Porres, as well as at the School of Distance Education of the National University Federico Villarreal and the Faculty of Law of the Inca Garcilaso de la Vega University.

For several years he has participated as a political analyst in various free-to-air and cable television programs (national and international).

=== Candidacy for Mayor of Lima ===
In the municipal elections of 2018 he ran for Mayor of Lima under the Popular Force; however, he was ranked 8th out of 20 candidates winning 2.7% of the vote for the capital's municipal seat and lost to Jorge Muñoz of the Popular Action.

=== Congressman ===
In the extraordinary elections of 2020, he was elected congressman under the Popular Force party for the complementary period 2020-2021. He obtained the second highest vote of all the candidates in his political group with 78,912 votes.

Currently, as a congressman, he is Titular Spokesperson of the Popular Force Parliamentary Group, he is also a titular member of the Permanent Commission of Congress.

He represents the Popular Force Parliamentary Group on the Board of Spokespersons of the Peruvian Parliament and is a full member of the Parliamentary Commissions of Economy, Banking, Finance and Financial Intelligence and of the Transport and Communications Commission.

The congressman supported the motion being one of the 105 parliamentarians who voted in favor of the removal of President Martín Vizcarra.

Columbus would later sign the Madrid Charter of the far-right Spanish party Vox, joining an international alliance of right-wing and far-right individuals.
