= Let's Go Peru =

Let's Go Peru Vamos Perú
- Abbreviation: VP
- President: Juan Sotomayor
- Founded: 27 September 2013
- Dissolved: 7 September 2021
- Headquarters: Lima, Peru
- Membership (2020): 27,758
- Ideology: Social democracy Populism; Humanism
- Political position: Centre to centre-left
- Colors: Salmon red
- Seats in the Congress: 0 / 130
- Governorships: 0 / 25
- Regional Councillors: 1 / 274
- Province Mayorships: 2 / 196
- District Mayorships: 2 / 1,874

Let's Go Peru (Spanish: Vamos Perú; VP) was a centre-left and social democratic Peruvian political party. Headquartered in Lima, the party mainly operated in Callao.

== History ==
Founded in mid-2013 by former Mayor of Callao, Juan Sotomayor, he currently serves a 36 preventive prison sentence as he awaits trial after being syndicated as the head of the Rich Port II organization, dedicated to the collection of ghost payroll members to the detriment of the Callao Public Cleaning Services company. The organization is also accused of being the author of the alleged crime against property and extortion to the detriment of the ESLIMP-CALLAO (Municipal Private Law Company). The Callao Provincial Attorney for Organized Crime ordered Sotomayor's pretrial detention along other members of the party. Sotomayor was first elected provincial mayor in 2010 for the Chim Pum Callao Regional Movement led by former Governor of Callao, Alex Kouri, and ran for reelection in 2014 with the newly-founded party in alliance with Kouri's regional organization.

At the start of Sotomayor's second term, the party became part of the Popular Alliance coalition alongside the social-democratic Peruvian Aprista Party and the christian democratic Christian People's Party, for the 2016 general election. The coalition's presidential nominee, former President Alan García, placed fifth with 5.8% of the popular vote, while the coalition attained 8.3% at congressional level, winning 5 seats going to the APRA only and the coalition was dissolved.

At the legislative elections held on 26 January 2020, the party won 2.1% of the popular vote but no seats in the Congress of the Republic.

In the 2021 general elections, the party was going to run with former Congressman Virgilio Acuña, the brother of Cesar Acuña as the candidate, but on November 19, 2020, the National Elections Jury rejected his registration.

As the party did not take part of the general election, the National Jury of Elections cancelled the party's registration in September 2021. The party dissolved following the registration cancellation.

== Election results ==
=== Presidential election ===
Year	Candidate	Party / Coalition	Votes	Percentage	Outcome
2016	Alan García	Popular Alliance PAP-PPC-VP	894 278	5.83	5th

=== Elections to the Congress of the Republic ===
Year	Votes	%	Seats	▲/▼	Position
2016	1 013 735	8.3% as part of Popular Alliance. None from Let's Go Peru	5 / 130	Steady	N/A
2020	311 413	2.1%	0 / 130	Steady	N/A

=== Regional and municipal elections ===
Year	Gobiernos Regionales	Alcaldías Provinciales	Alcaldías Distritales
Year	Outcome	Outcome	Outcome
2014	0 / 25	0 / 196	6 / 1,874
2018	0 / 25	2 / 196	10 / 1,874
