= Felipe Osterling =

Peruvian lawyer, writer and politician

President of the Senate
- In office 26 July 1991 – 5 April 1992
- Vice President: First Vice President Germán Escalante; Second Vice President Eugenio Chang Cruz
- Preceded by: Máximo San Román
- Succeeded by: Jaime Yoshiyama (as President of the Democratic Constituent Congress)

Minister of Justice and Worship
- In office 28 July 1980 – 3 August 1981
- President: Fernando Belaúnde
- Preceded by: Luis Vargas Caballero
- Succeeded by: Enrique Elías Laroza

Member of the Senate
- In office 26 July 1985 – 5 April 1992
- Constituency: Lima

Personal details
- Born: Felipe Enrique Osterling Parodi; 14 May 1932 Lima, Peru
- Died: 30 August 2014 (aged 82) Lima, Peru
- Party: Christian People's Party
- Spouse: Josefina Letts Colmenares
- Children: Madeleine Osterling
- Website: www.osterlingfirm.com

Felipe Enrique Osterling Parodi (14 May 1932 – 30 August 2014) was a Peruvian lawyer, writer and politician. He was a member and leader of the Christian People's Party, and served in senior positions in the Peruvian government.

== Early life and education ==
He was the son of Luis Felipe Osterling Parodi Irvine and Regina Garcia. He was the uncle of the prominent Peruvian lawyer Alfredo Enrique Martín Parodi Plaza, and pharmacist and businessman Luis Miguel Parodi Plaza. He attended the school of the Sacred Hearts Recoleta. He studied law at the Pontifical Catholic University of Peru, from which he graduated in 1967. He did postgraduate studies at the Faculty of Law of the University of Michigan and the New York University.

== Career ==
Since 1957 he was professor of Pontifical Catholic University of Peru, where he taught courses on Private International Law, Contracts and Civil Law Practice. Since 1964, he was head teacher, and dictated the course of Obligations Law, which also was in charge at the University of Lima (1986–1989). In 1966 he attended as a visiting professor at the Universities of Notre Dame, Harvard, Georgetown, Columbia and New York.

He was Dean of the Pontifical Catholic University of Peru for the period 1969–1972.

== Political career ==
In July 1980 he was appointed Minister of Justice and Worship by Fernando Belaunde Terry, as such a ministry had to refound disappeared in the Revolutionary Government of the Armed Forces remained in office until August 1981.

In the 1985 general election, he was elected Senator representing the Christian People's Party for the period 1985 to 1990. Inside the Senate, he was member of the Permanent Commission of the Congress and the Committees on National Defense and Justice and Internal Order.

In the 1990 general election, he was reelected as Senator representing his party under the FREDEMO coalition of Mario Vargas Llosa for the period 1990 to 1995. A year later he was elected President of the Senate for the legislature 1991 – 1992.

With the coup of 1992, Osterling was unable to perform his duties and was even beaten by the police that restricted entry to the Congress because he was under "house arrest". After these incidents, he returned to his law firm, and was Dean of the School of Lawyers of Lima in 1995.

In May 1993 it was incorporated as a full member of the Peruvian Academy of Law, of which he was President (2006–2008). It is also relevant academic of the National Academy of Law and Social Sciences of Buenos Aires (Argentina).

He served as chairman of Hoechst Peruana SA, Vice Chairman of San Juan SAA Brewery, director of the Corporation Backus & Johnston SAA, vice chairman of Volcan Compania Minera SAA, Chairman of the Brewers and director of the National Society of Industries.

Today is the study's lead attorney Osterling, Vice Chairman of Volcan Compania Minera. He remained a member of the Christian People's Party.

== Books ==
- Challenges and Achievements, in Justice, Teaching Methods of Law Obligations, Study on Monetary Obligations in Peru (1995)
- Compendium of Civil Law, Blackberry and Old Cupboard Pages (2005).
