= Popular Alliance (Peru) =

Popular Alliance Alianza Popular
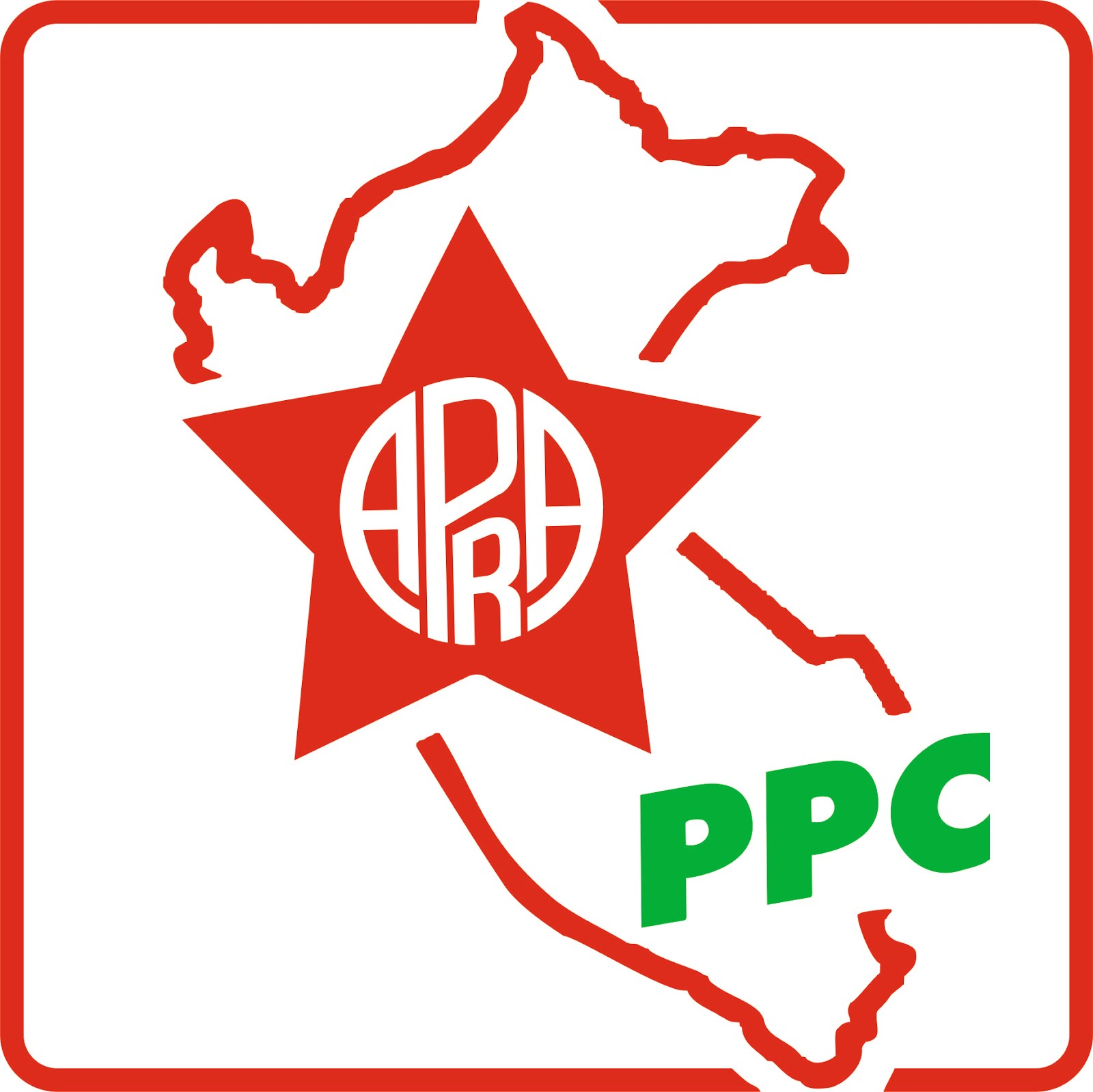
- Abbreviation: AlP
- Leader: Alan García
- Secretary-General: Javier Velásquez
- Party Presidents: Alan García (PAP); Raúl Castro Stagnaro (PPC); Juan Sotomayor (VP)
- Founded: December 12, 2015
- Dissolved: April 11, 2016
- Headquarters: Breña, Lima
- Ideology: Social democracy Third Way; Centrism; Christian democracy Liberalism
- Political position: Center-right
- International affiliation: Socialist International (PAP); International Democrat Union (PPC); Centrist Democrat International (PPC)
- Members: List: Peruvian Aprista Party; Christian People's Party; Let's Go Peru

Popular Alliance (Spanish: Alianza Popular) was a political coalition of two of the oldest and historically recognized political parties in Peru, the Peruvian Aprista Party (PAP), led by former President Alan García, and the Christian People's Party (PPC), led by Lourdes Flores. The alliance was made by mutual agreement by both leaders with the objective of leading García for a third non-consecutive presidential term in the 2016 general election. The third member of the coalition was the minor political party Let's Go Peru (VP), led by Mayor of Callao Juan Sotomayor.

The coalition ticket was composed of Alan García as the presidential nominee, and Lourdes Flores (former Congresswoman and 2001 and 2006 presidential nominee) and David Salazar (former Governor of the Apurímac Region) as first and second running mates.

The coalition was dissolved after its poor results on the general election, held on April 10, 2016.

== Election results ==
=== Presidential election ===
Year	Candidate	Coalition	Votes	Percentage	Outcome
2016	Alan García	Popular Alliance PAP-PPC-VP	894 278	5.83	5th

=== Elections to the Congress of the Republic ===
Year	Votes	%	Seats	▲/▼	Position
2016	1 013 735	8.3%	5 / 130	▲1 (only for the PAP)	Minority
