= 2018 Peruvian regional and municipal elections =

Local elections in Peru

2018 Peru regional elections
- October 7, 2018

25 governorships
	Majority party	Minority party
Leader	Manuel Llenpén	Mesías Guevara
Party	Alliance for Progress	Popular Action
Leader's seat	La Libertad	Cajamarca
Seats before	2	0
Seats won	3	3
Seats after	4	3
Seat change	▲2	▲3

Municipal and regional elections were held in Peru on 7 October 2018. In the election, Peruvians voted for governors, vice governors and regional councilors at a regional level while at a municipal level, citizens voted for mayors and municipal councilors. Those elected took office 1 January 2019 and serve their term until 31 December 2022.

== Race summary ==
Region	Incumbent	Party	First elected	Incumbent status	1st round	2nd round
Amazonas	Gilmer Horna	Independent	2014	Incumbent term limited New governor elected	Oscar Altamirano (I) 25% Diógenes Celis (I) 24% Others 58%	✓ Oscar Altamirano (I) 56% Diógenes Celis (I) 45%
Áncash	Luis Gamarra	Independent	2017	Incumbent term limited New governor elected We Are Peru gain	Juan Rebaza (I) 16% Juan Morillo (WAP) 14% Others 70%	✓ Juan Morillo (WAP) 56% Juan Rebaza (I) 44%
Apurímac	Wilber Venegas	Independent	2014	Incumbent term limited New governor elected	Baltazar Lantaron (I) 21% Michael Martinez (I) 19% Others 60%	✓ Baltazar Lantaron (I) 61% Michael Martinez (I) 39%
Arequipa	Yamila Osorio	Independent	2014	Incumbent term limited New governor elected	Elmer Cáceres (I) 19% Javier Ísmodes (I) 13% Others 68%	✓ Elmer Cáceres (I) 58% Javier Ísmodes (I) 42%
Ayacucho	Wilfredo Oscorima	Independent	2014	Incumbent term limited New governor elected	Carlos Rúa (I) 28% Richard Prado (I) 24% Others 52%	✓ Carlos Rúa (I) 58% Richard Prado (I) 42%
Cajamarca	Porfirio Medina	Independent	2014	Incumbent term limited New governor elected Popular Action gain	Walter Benavides (AFP) 23% Mesías Guevara (PA) 21% Others	✓ Mesías Guevara (PA) 61% Walter Benavides (AFP) 39%
Callao	Walter Mori	Independent	2017	Incumbent term limited New governor elected	✓ Dante Mandriotti (I) 32% Iván Rivadeneyra (I) 20% Others 48%	
Cusco	Edwin Licona	Independent	2014	Incumbent term limited New governor elected Popular Action gain	Jean Benavente (PA) 15% Luis Wilson (NR) 15% Others 70%	✓ Jean Benavente (PA) 70% Luis Wilson (NR) 30%
Huancavelica	Glodoaldo Álvarez	Independent	2014	Incumbent term limited New governor elected	✓ Maciste Díaz (I) 36% Leoncio Huayllani (I) 33% Others 31%	
Huánuco	Rubén Alva	Independent	2014	Incumbent term limited New governor elected Popular Action gain	Luis Picón (I) 18% Juan Alvarado (PA) 16% Others 66%	✓ Juan Alvarado (PA) 56% Luis Picón (I) 44%
Ica	Fernando Cillóniz	Popular Force	2014	Incumbent term limited New governor elected	✓ Javier Gallegos (I) 33% José Elías (GOC-SIP) 17% Others 50%	
Junín	Ángel Unchupaico	Independent	2014	Incumbent term limited New governor elected	✓ Vladimir Cerrón (I) 37% César Combina (I) 24% Others 39%	
La Libertad	Luis Valdez	Alliance for Progress	2015	Incumbent term limited New governor elected Alliance for Progress hold	✓ Manuel Llenpén (AFP) 33% Julio Morán (PAP) 16% Others 51%	
Lambayeque	Humberto Acuña	Alliance for Progress	2010	Incumbent term limited New governor elected We Are Peru gain	✓ Anselmo Lozano (WAP) 42% Agustín Lozano (AFP) 19% Others 39%	
Lima	Nelson Chui	Independent	2014	Incumbent term limited New governor elected	Ricardo Chavarría (I) 17% Javier Alvarado (I) 15% Others	✓ Ricardo Chavarría (I) 65% Javier Alvarado (I) 35%
Loreto	Fernando Meléndez	Independent	2014	Incumbent term limited New governor elected National Restoration gain	✓ Elisbán Ochoa (NR) 34% Jorge Mera (I) 27% Others 39%	
Madre de Dios	Luis Otsuka	Direct Democracy	2014	Incumbent term limited New governor elected Alliance for Progress gain	Juan Cjuno (I) 24% Luis Hidalgo (AFP) 22% Others 52%	✓ Luis Hidalgo (AFP) 59% Juan Cjuno (I) 41%
Moquegua	Jaime Rodríguez	Independent	2014	Incumbent term limited New governor elected	✓ Zenón Cuevas (I) 42% Carlos Carrera (UFP) 21% Others 37%	
Pasco	Teódulo Quispe	Popular Force	2014	Incumbent term limited New governor elected Alliance for Progress gain	Rudy Callupe (WCP) 23% Pedro Ubaldo (AFP) 18% Others 59%	✓ Pedro Ubaldo (AFP) 59% Rudy Callupe (WCP) 41%
Piura	Reynaldo Hilbck	Independent	2014	Incumbent term limited New governor elected	Santiago Paz (I) 22% Servando García (I) 20% Others 58%	✓ Servando García (I) 63% Santiago Paz (I) 37%
Puno	Juan Luque	Independent	2014	Incumbent term limited New governor elected	✓ Walter Aduviri (I) 44% Richard Hancco (I) 16% Others 40%	
San Martín	Víctor Noriega	Popular Force	2014	Incumbent term limited New governor elected	Walter Grundel (AFP) 29% Pedro Bogarín (I) 21% Others 50%	✓ Pedro Bogarín (I) 51% Walter Grundel (AFP) 49%
Tacna	Omar Jiménez	Independent	2014	Incumbent term limited New governor elected	Juan Tonconi (I) 17% Luis Torres (I) 16% Others 67%	✓ Juan Tonconi (I) 61% Luis Torres (I) 39%
Tumbes	Ricardo Flores	Independent	2014	Incumbent term limited New governor elected	Wilmer Dios (I) 24% Segismundo Cruces (DD) 17% Others 41%	✓ Wilmer Dios (I) 51% Segismundo Cruces (DD) 49%
Ucayali	Manuel Gambini	Independent	2014	Incumbent term limited New governor elected Alliance for Progress gain	✓ Francisco Pezo(AFP) 37% Edwin Vásquez (I) 22% Others 41%	

Jorge Muñoz Wells of Popular Action was elected Mayor of Lima.

Popular Force, the party of Keiko Fujimori which held the majority in the Congress of the Republic of Peru at the time, saw little success in the elections. The party saw no candidates elected into Lima or regional governments within Peru.

== See also ==
- Lima municipal elections 2018
