= Christian People's Party (Peru) =

Political party in Peru

Christian People's Party Partido Popular Cristiano
- Abbreviation: PPC
- President: Carlos Neuhaus
- Secretary-General: Claudia Chirinos; Matilde Lozada; Javier Bedoya Denegri
- Founder: Luis Bedoya Reyes
- Founded: December 18, 1966
- Split from: Christian Democratic Party
- Headquarters: 1484 Alfonso Ugarte Ave, Lima
- Membership (2020): 278,672
- Ideology: Christian democracy Social conservatism
- Political position: Centre-right
- Religion: Catholic Church
- National affiliation: National Unity
- Regional affiliation: Christian Democrat Organization of America; Union of Latin American Parties
- International affiliation: Christian Democrat International; International Democracy Union
- Colors: Green
- Seats in the Congress: 0 / 130
- Governorships: 0 / 25
- Regional Councillors: 0 / 274
- Province Mayorships: 0 / 196
- District Mayorships: 0 / 1,874

Website
- ppc.pe

The Christian People's Party (Spanish: Partido Popular Cristiano, PPC) is a centre-right and conservative political party based on the principles of Christian democracy. It was founded in 1966 by Christian Democratic Party dissidents, led by Luis Bedoya Reyes, at the time mayor of Lima.

Participating for the first time in elections in 1978, the PPC managed to solidify its presence in coastal urban areas throughout the 1980s, but it was not enough to win the Peruvian presidency, as Luis Bedoya Reyes placed third in both the 1980 and 1985 general elections. The 1990s saw the party experience an internal crisis while Fujimorism would dominate right-wing politics throughout the decade.

In 2000, the PPC's party registration was revoked by the National Jury of Elections under orders of the Fujimori administration. Recovering its registration in the aftermath of Fujimori's downfall, it became the dominant party of the National Unity coalition, placing third in both the 2001 and 2006 general elections under the candidacy of Lourdes Flores.

Following a series of political failures amid a more severe internal crisis throughout the 2010s, the PPC failed to overcome the electoral threshold at the 2021 general election, and lost its party registration for a second time at the National Jury of Elections.

The party attained its re-registration on 11 May 2024, and its projected to participate in the National Unity coalition for the 2026 general election with Roberto Chiabra as the coalition's presumptive presidential nominee.

== History ==
=== Foundation ===
The Christian People's Party was founded by a group of members of the Christian Democratic Party who ideologically disagreed with militants close to Marxism and socialist tendencies. Luis Bedoya Reyes, then mayor of Lima, established the group on December 18, 1966. Its headquarters was the house of Luis Giusti La Rosa, who would later become the first secretary general.

=== Velasco Military dictatorship ===
In 1968, General Juan Velasco Alvarado staged a coup d'etat against President Fernando Belaúnde Terry, an ally of Luis Bedoya Reyes. The PPC did not support the military regime and was one of its most fierce opponents, along with the American Popular Revolutionary Alliance (APRA). The latter was declared illegal.

=== 1978 Constituent Assembly ===
In 1978, the government of General Francisco Morales-Bermúdez called for elections for a Constituent Assembly. The PPC attained the second place in the polls, after the APRA. Bedoya Reyes, widely preferred by the Assembly members to become its president, gave the position to the veteran APRA leader, Víctor Raúl Haya de la Torre.

=== 1980 general election and Fernando Belaúnde's second presidency ===
Luis Bedoya Reyes ran as the PPC's candidate for president in the 1980 general election, with Ernesto Alayza and Roberto Ramírez del Villar as his two running mates. Despite Bedoya finishing in the third place, the PPC obtained six seats in the Senate, as well as 10 representatives in the lower house.

During the elections, the PPC allied with the soon-to-be elected President Fernando Belaúnde Terry, from Acción Popular. The PPC-Accíon Popular coalition gave Belaúnde the majority in the Senate and in the Deputies Chamber. The coalition also designated four PPC members as Ministers, including its leader Bedoya Reyes and Felipe Osterling Parodi.

=== Democratic Convergence (1985) and opposition to Alan García's first presidency ===
For the General Elections of 1985, the coalition with Acción Popular was finished, and thus, both parties presented separate candidates. Bedoya Reyes finished in third again, trailing behind Alfonso Barrantes Lingán and ahead of Javier Alva Orlandinj. During Alan García's government, the PPC criticised the heterodox economic model designed by the APRA.

The PPC had only a few members in both chambers. Its most important representatives were Felipe Osterling Parodi in the Senate of Peru and Javier Bedoya – son of the founder of the PPC – in the Chamber of Deputies. When Alan García sought to take control of private banking, Luis Bedoya Reyes and Lourdes Flores rallied in the streets against the proposal. They were joined in the manifestations by the famous Peruvian writer Mario Vargas Llosa. The movement did stop the government from passing the polemical Law.

=== Democratic Front (1990) ===
In 1990, the PPC enters a liberal coalition with Acción Popular and Mario Vargas Llosa's Movimiento Libertad (Liberty Movement), forming the Frente Democrático (Democratic Front, FREDEMO), which launched Vargas Llosa as a candidate for the presidency. Although he wasn't elected, the coalition's participation in the Chamber of Deputies was a success: it got 25 representatives, attaining the majority, including Javier Bedoya, one of the most voted deputies nationwide.

=== 1992 Democratic Constituent Congress election ===
The PPC held the presidency of the Senate under Felipe Osterling Parodi's leadership when, in 1992, Alberto Fujimori staged a self-coup, dissolving both Chambers of the Congress, neutralising the FREDEMO and the APRA.

Fujimori held polls to elect a Democratic Constituent Congress, where his party, Cambio 90-Nueva Mayoría, got an absolute majority. The PPC was divided between those who wanted to be part of the elections and those who did not want to. Amongst those who did not want to participate where Natale Amprimo, Alberto Borea and Alberto Andrade, arguing that the PPC should not be part of a non-democratic process. In the other hand, Luis Bedoya Reyes, Lourdes Flores and Xavier Barrón contended that the PPC should present itself to guarantee democracy in the Constituent Congress. The decision of being part of the elections led to the resignations of Amprimo, Borea and Andrade. The PPC was the second most-voted party, but it was far behind of Cambio 90-Nueva Mayoría.

=== 1995 and 2000 general elections ===
In the General Elections of 1995, the PPC nominated Lourdes Flores as its candidate for president, but in the end she resigned to support Javier Pérez de Cuéllar's candidacy. Fujimori won without a run-off and the PPC only got the seventh place in the elections for Congressmen and three out of 120.

When Alberto Fujimori wanted to run for a third period in the General Elections of 2000, he was strongly opposed by the PPC. Congressmen Xavier Barrón, Ántero Flores Aráoz and Lourdes Flores proposed a law project that gave way to a referendum, where the people could decide whether Fujimori could participate in the elections. The Congress, controlled by Cambio 90-Nueva Mayoría did not let the Law pass. After the proposal of the law, the National Jury of Elections withdrew the PPC's inscription as a party, so it could not present candidates for the Congress. Because of that, Alejandro Toledo's Perú Posible party decided to support the PPC, including Xavier Barrón and Antero Flores Aráoz, as guests in its list for the Congress. Both of them were elected to Congress.

=== National Unity (2001–2010) ===
In 2001, during the interim government of Acción Popular's Valentín Paniagua, the PPC recouped its inscription. It became part of a political coalition with Renovación Nacional and Cambio Radical, named Unidad Nacional (National Unity). The alliance's candidate for president was Lourdes Flores, who placed third by a narrow margin.

In 2006, the Unidad Nacional coalition continued, maintaining Lourdes Flores as its candidate. She did not pass to the round-off, again by a narrow margin, and again trailing behind Alan García, who would become President for a second time.

In 2007, Ántero Flores Aráoz, the former president of the party, said in a disgraceful way that he would like to run for the Presidency of the Republic, as long as his party accredits it. He was accused of having a little brotherly and loyal behavior with the leader and members of the party, so he finally resigned from the PPC. Soon after, he was appointed permanent ambassador of Peru to the OAS. Lourdes Flores ran for mayor of Lima in the municipal elections of Lima in 2010, being defeated by Susana Villarán.

=== Alliance for the Great Change (2011) ===
In 2010, they formed the Alliance for the Great Change, launching Pedro Pablo Kuczynski to the presidency in the general elections of Peru in 2011. This alliance won 12 of the 130 seats in the Congress of the Republic, 7 of which belong to the PPC.

In November 2011, Raúl Castro Stagnaro was elected as the new party president, replacing Lourdes Flores.

=== Electoral failures after 2011 ===
The PPC decided to support the Metropolitan Council of Lima in the popular consultation process for the revocation of March 2013, getting Mayor Susana Villarán to commit to fulfilling an agenda for Lima. The councilors of the mayor's party were revoked, but those of the PPC were supported by the citizens. In November of the same year, the PPC achieved victory in the new municipal elections, held to replace the accessories who had entered after the March process. Thus, since January 2014, the PPC is the first minority of the Metropolitan Council.

In 2014, the PPC bases elected the former mayor of Villa El Salvador, Jaime Zea as a Candidate for Mayor of Lima. The result of the electoral process was one of the worst defeats of the party, barely obtaining seven district mayoralties in Lima and its candidate 3% of the votes, remaining in 6th place.

=== Popular Alliance (2016) and new leadership ===
In 2016, they formed a political coalition with APRA called the Popular Alliance, after not obtaining any seats in congress, the political alliance was dissolved. That is why it does not have representation in congress for the period 2016-2021, the Partido Popular Cristiano party is in crisis. In this same year, the party premises are for sale valued at US $2,000,000.00.

The PPC militants, according to the party's Statute, convened a National Congress for December 16 and 17, 2017, in order to be able to elect a new national leadership due to the absence of authorities since 2016. Former Congressman Alberto Beingolea was elected in this process, defeating fellow former Congressman Javier Bedoya de Vivanco.

=== 2021 general election and loss of party registration ===
For the 2021 general election, Alberto Beingolea announced the establishment of National Unity, a party leadership roundtable of the Christian People's Party to analyze options if running in a coalition or independently in the elections. The roundtable managed to negotiate with a variety of political personalities and parties until reaching an agreement César Acuña of Alliance for Progress. The alliance was officially signed on 12 October 2020, but lasted only six days, upon the revelation of disconformity from PPC's leadership, most prominently from the party Secretary General, Marisol Pérez Tello, who rejected Acuña by stating "she would not support a plagiarizer". Illegal audios were revealed by the press, and the alliance broke off almost immediately.

Following the failed agreement with Alliance for Progress, Beingolea announced that he would run for the party's presidential nomination. He formally attained the nomination on 29 November 2020.

On election day, Beingolea only garnered 2% of the vote, placing eleventh in the election for the presidency; at congressional level, the party failed to attain representation. The party lost its registration at the National Jury of Elections on 7 September 2021, alongside other fifteen parties that failed to overcome the electoral threshold in the last general election.

=== Renewed registration (2024) ===
Less than three years since the loss of the party registration, the party regained its registration for a second time at the National Jury of Elections on 10 May 2024.

Under the leadership of Carlos Neuhaus, the party announced its primary election consisting of the candidacy’s of Neuhaus himself, former Prime Minister Óscar Valdés, former Governor Fernando Cillóniz of Ica, and former Foreign Minister Javier González Olaechea.

=== Government of José Jerí ===
In October 2025, following the vacancy of Dina Boluarte and the beginning of José Jerí’s government, lawyer and party activist Ernesto Álvarez Miranda assumed the presidency of the Council of Ministers of the transitional government. For this, he requested a leave of absence from his party membership.

=== General elections 2026 ===
For the 2026 elections, in July 2025, the PPC formed an alliance with the party Unidad y Paz, led by Roberto Chiabra. At an extraordinary congress held by the PPC, it was decided to establish an alliance with Unidad y Paz and promote Chiabra as their candidate. When asked by the press, the party’s vice president, Miguel Ángel Mufarech, revealed that they had previously proposed an electoral alliance to Popular Force so that its leader, Keiko Fujimori, would head a joint list for the Senate, but the Fujimorist party did not accept.

== Election results ==
=== Presidential elections ===
Year	Candidate	Party / Coalition	Votes	Percentage	Outcome
1980	Luis Bedoya Reyes	Partido Popular Cristiano	382 957	9.58	3rd
1985	Luis Bedoya Reyes	Democratic Convergence PPC-MBH	773 705	11.89	3rd
1990	Mario Vargas Llosa	Democratic Front AP-PPC-ML	1st Round: 2 163 323 2nd Round: 2 708 291	1st Round: 32.57 2nd Round: 37.62	1st Round: 1st 2nd Round: 2nd
1995	Lourdes Flores	Partido Popular Cristiano	Ticket withdrawn	N/A	N/A
2001	Lourdes Flores	National Unity PPC-SN-RN-CR	2 576 653	24.30	3rd
2006	Lourdes Flores	National Unity PPC-SN-RN	2 923 280	23.81	3rd
2011	Pedro Pablo Kuczynski	Alliance for the Great Change APP-PPC-RN-PHP	2 711 450	18.51	3rd
2016	Alan García	Popular Alliance PAP-PPC-VP	894 278	5.83	5th
2021	Alberto Beingolea	Partido Popular Cristiano	278,784	1.98	11th
2026	Roberto Chiabra	National Unity PPC-UyP-PUSL	67,939	0.41	23rd

=== Elections to the Congress of the Republic ===
Year	Votes	%	Seats	▲/▼	Position
1992	606 651	9.7%	8 / 80	Steady	Minority
1995	135 236	3.1%	3 / 120	▼5	Minority
2000	Inscription withdrawn	N/A	N/A	Steady	N/A
2001	1 304 037 as part of National Unity. 6 from the Christian People's Party	13.8%	17 / 120	▲6	Minority
2006	1 648 717 as part of National Unity. 10 from the Christian People's Party	15.3%	17 / 120	▲4	Minority
2011	1 851 080 as part of Alliance for the Great Change. 7 from the Christian People's Party.	14.4%	12 / 130	▼3	Minority
2016	1 013 735 as part of Popular Alliance. 0 from the Christian People's Party.	8.3%	5 / 130	▼7	N/A
2020	590 378	4.0%	0 / 130	Steady	N/A
2021	212 811	1.7%	0 / 130	Steady	N/A

=== Elections to the Senate ===
Year	Votes	%	Seats	▲/▼	Position
1980	385 674	9.3%	6 / 60	▲6	Minority
1985	675 621 as part of Democratic Convergence. 3 from the Christian People's Party.	11.2%	7 / 60	▼3	Minority
1990	1 791 077 as part of Democratic Front. 5 from the Christian People's Party.	32.3%	20 / 60	▲2	Minority
2026	71 735 as part of National Unity.	0.50%	0 / 60	Steady	Extra-parliamentary

=== Elections to the Chamber of Deputies ===
Year	Votes	%	Seats	▲/▼	Position
1980	348 578	9.6%	10 / 180	▲10	Minority
1985	649 404 as part of Democratic Convergence. 6 from the Christian People's Party.	11.1%	12 / 180	▼4	Minority
1990	1 492 513 as part of Democratic Front. 25 from the Christian People's Party.	30.1%	62 / 180	▲19	Minority
2026	55 285 as part of National Unity.	0.41%	0 / 130	Steady	Extra-parliamentary
