= Direct Democracy (Peru) =

Direct Democracy Democracia Directa
- Abbreviation: DD
- President: Andrés Alcántara Paredes
- Founded: 17 November 2001
- Membership (2020): 8,728
- Ideology: Socialism
- Political position: Left-wing
- Colors: Yellow; Red
- Seats in the Congress: 0 / 130
- Governorships: 0 / 25
- Regional Councillors: 7 / 274
- Province Mayorships: 0 / 196
- District Mayorships: 0 / 1,874

Website
- democraciadirecta.pe

Direct Democracy is a Peruvian political party. Founded in 2001 as Fonavistas of Peru, the party is based on the principles and objectives proposed by the National Association of Fonavistas of the Peoples of Peru (ANFPP). The current political platform was founded by a group of ANFPP affiliates, led by Andrés Alcántara Paredes in 2013.

== History ==
The ANFPP is recognized by the ONPE from the acquisition of the electoral KIT that it presents to the Congress of the Republic with 71, 717 valid signatures to undertake the legislative initiative of the Bill for the Refund of Fonavi to the workers who contributed to it.

The National Association of Fonavistas of Peruvian Peoples (ANFPP) is formed in order for contributors to the National Housing Fund to obtain a refund of the money that was deducted from them. This association obtains the required signatures to promote the holding of an approving referendum that was held on October 3, 2010, in which the option for the return of contributions is imposed. The return of the contributions was imposed by 9,115,867 votes of the population. Subsequently, on December 8, 2010, the resolution declaring the triumph of the SI was published in the official newspaper El Peruano; as well as, Law No. 29625- LAW APPROVED BY REFERENDUM- FONAVI Money Refund Law to the workers who contributed to it.

=== Foundation of Direct Democracy ===
The registration of the political party Direct Democracy was formalized through Resolution No. 226 published in the official newspaper El Peruano. According to the resolution: "The application for registration was submitted on December 7, 2011, together with 19 thousand 600 spreadsheets and three compact discs with the requirements for this type of procedure, but these could not be verified due to deficiencies." The valid signatures presented by Fonavismo Democracia Directa to achieve its registration were 164,672.

In the first place, regarding the presidential process, on December 20, internal elections were held at the main premises of the Direct Democracy party. As a result of this election, it was established that the party's presidential formula would be made up of Gregorio Santos Guerrero as the candidate for the presidency of the republic; as candidate for the first vice-presidency, Andrés Avelino Alcántara Paredes and in the second vice-presidency Simón Chipana Huanca.

Later, on January 6, 2016, Andrés Alcántara Paredes, leader of Democracia Directa, announced the presentation of the application for registration of the party's presidential board. This request was presented to the Lima Special Electoral Jury by Daniel Ronald Raa Ortiz, who serves as the party's legal representative.

==== Participation of Gregorio Santos and Post-2016 electoral campaign ====
Gregorio Santos, an educator by profession and former member of the Red Homeland, was active in the Social Affirmation Movement when he was invited to join Democracia Directa. Santos was in prison when this happened. His participation as a presidential candidate for this party had different reactions from his followers. Despite criticism, Santos' participation had, in terms of majority acceptance in Cajamarca. His status as a candidate was not affected by his incarceration, as he had no conviction. (Meléndez 2016: 180–204)

The 2016 elections envisioned the possibility that Direct Democracy dint not obtain representation in the Andean Parliament, despite overcoming the electoral fence. The application of the electoral fence in said elections established that parties that fail to obtain six congressmen in more than one constituency or obtain less than 5% of the valid votes in the entire country would lose their registration with the Registry of Political Organizations (ROP).

Different experts expressed their opinion about this controversy, among them the Secretary General of Transparency indicated that only the vote in the election to the Congress of the Republic should be considered when talking about a ‘national election’. However, Andrés Alcántara, leader of Direct Democracy, pointed out that: [...] they would have passed the electoral fence by obtaining 5.15% of the valid votes in the Andean Parliament [...] therefore, in addition, it would correspond to them that their candidates in the congressional election who were elected in their constituencies can access a representative position. (El Comercio 2016; El Comercio 2016)

Finally, the National Office of Electoral Processes (ONPE) ruled on the matter and announced that, despite having passed the fence, the Direct Democracy party did not reach the electoral barrier and therefore would not obtain parliamentary representation.

=== 2021 general elections ===
For the 2021 elections, the party nominated party president Andrés Alcántara for the Presidency. On Election Day, he placed last with 0.35% of the vote and the party failed to win seats in Congress with only 0.78% of the vote and is expected to lose its electoral registry.

== Principles of the party ==
On the one hand, the principles of the political organization Direct Democracy that are contemplated in article 8 of its statute are twelve:

The first point refers to respect for human life and the biodiversity of the planet, for this it is necessary to protect and promote individual and collective development of human beings, especially in the national territory. The second point points to work as a factor of human development. This also implies eliminating all forms of exploitation and segregation of the worker. The third point establishes direct democracy, as a mechanism for the people to administer, directly legislate society through participation in public life and state affairs. The sovereignty of the people is above all other powers of the State and institutions (ANFPP 2016).

In the sixth point, it is pointed out that the economy must generate social equilibrium, considering the person as the supreme goal by satisfying the needs of human society that contributes to generating wealth and integrates into its distribution. Likewise, the social balance considers the preservation of the environment by must be guaranteed. The seventh point establishes that the regionalization process must be consolidated and at the same time the effective decentralization process must be promoted, promoting alternative development poles to the capital (ANFPP 2016).

With regard to points eight, nine and ten, these refer to the needs of citizens. Regarding point eight, education is understood as necessary to achieve integral development, so it must be universal and free to insert students into productive activity. Likewise, health is understood as a universal right, since the State must guarantee health and medication. In addition, point ten indicates that social security must be administered by the workers themselves (ANFPP 2016).

Finally, the last two principles of the party correspond to the characteristics of the state. This must be transparent; in other words, the information must be public without exceptions. In addition, it must be decent in the political sense, its proposals for State policies must be fair, true and reasonable. Otherwise, sanctions must be applied. (ANFPP 2016).

== Election results ==
=== Presidential election ===
| Year | Candidate | Party | Votes | Percentage | Outcome |
|---|---|---|---|---|---|
| 2011 | José Ñique de la Puente | Fonavistas del Perú | 37,011 | 0.25 | 6th |
| 2016 | Gregorio Santos | Democracia Directa | 613 173 | 4.00 | 6th |
| 2021 | Andrés Alcántara Paredes | Democracia Directa | 49,698 | 0.35 | 18th |

=== Elections to the Congress of the Republic ===
| Year | Votes | % | Seats | ▲/▼ | Position |
|---|---|---|---|---|---|
| 2011 | 170 052 | 1.3% | 0 / 130 | Steady | N/A |
| 2016 | 528 301 | 4.3% | 0 / 130 | Steady | N/A |
| 2020 | 543 956 | 3.7% | 0 / 130 | Steady | N/A |
| 2021 | 100 033 | 0.8% | 0 / 130 | Steady | N/A |

=== Regional and municipal elections ===
| Year | Gobiernos Regionales | Alcaldías Provinciales | Alcaldías Distritales |
| Year | Outcome | Outcome | Outcome |
|---|---|---|---|
| 2010 | 0 / 25 | 0 / 196 | 1 / 1,874 |
| 2014 | 1 / 25 | 0 / 196 | 15 / 1,874 |
| 2018 | 0 / 25 | 8 / 196 | 36 / 1,874 |
