= List of political parties in Peru =

This article lists political parties in Peru. Peru has a multi-party system with several political parties competing in legislative and presidential elections. As a consequence, it is rare for any single political organization to obtain an absolute majority in the bicameral Congress of Peru, thus, these parties often work with each other to form coalition governments.

== Parties with representation ==
Party	Abbr.	Est.	Members (2023)	Ideology	Senate	Chamber of Deputies	Regional governors	Provincial mayors	District mayors	Andean Parliament
Popular Force; Fuerza Popular	FP	2009	58,779	Social conservatism; Right-wing populism; Fujimorism	22 / 60	41 / 130	0 / 25	0 / 196	3 / 1,874	1 / 5
Together for Peru; Juntos por el Perú	JP	2001 (as PHP)	52,157	Democratic socialism; Progressivism	14 / 60	32 / 130	0 / 25	4 / 196	38 / 1,874	1 / 5
Popular Renewal; Renovación Popular	RP	1998 (as PSN)	50,886	National conservatism; Right-wing populism; Economic liberalism	8 / 60	15 / 130	0 / 25	2 / 196	36 / 1,874	1 / 5
Party of Good Government; Partido del Buen Gobierno	PBG	2023	37,865	Social liberalism; Reformism; Progressivism	7 / 60	18 / 130	0 / 25	0 / 196	0 / 1,874	1 / 5
Now Nation; Ahora Nación	AN	2023	62,234	Democratic socialism; Social liberalism; Progressivism	4 / 60	10 / 130	0 / 25	0 / 196	0 / 1,874	0 / 5
Civic Party OBRAS; Partido Cívico OBRAS	OBRAS	1989		Populism; Nationalism; Social conservatism; Anti-Fujimorism	5 / 60	14 / 130	0 / 25	0 / 196	0 / 1,874	1 / 5

== Active parties without representation ==
- Free Peru
- Popular Action
- Alliance for Progress
- Go on Country – Social Integration Party (2017)
- We Are Peru
- Podemos Perú
- Purple Party
- Front of Hope 2021
- Agricultural People's Front of Peru
- New Peru for Good Living
- Democratic Green Party
- Faith in Peru
- Let's Save Peru
- Patriotic Party of Peru
- People's Liberty
- Modern Peru
- American Popular Revolutionary Alliance
- PRIN Political Party
- Peru First
- United Peru Democratic Party
- First the People
- Workers and Entrepreneurs Party
- Progresemos
- Peruvians United: We Are Free!
- Popular Cooperation
- Battle Peru
- Unity and Peace
- Forward United People
- Christian People's Party
- Peru Action

== Active parties without registration ==
- ADP Political Party
- Christian Democratic Party
- Citizens for Peru Party
- Country For All
- Communist Party of Peru (Red Fatherland)
- Communist Party of Peru (Marxist-Leninist)
- Green Earth Transformative Coalition
- Movement for Socialism (currently part of Together for Peru)
- Nation Now
- Peruvian Communist Party (currently part of Together for Peru)
- Socialist Party (currently part of New Peru)
- Voices of the People
- Yes, I Believe Party

== Defunct parties ==
=== Since the 2001 general election ===
- All for Victory
- Youth Independent Movement
- Cambio 90 – New Majority

=== Since the 2006 general election ===
- And It's Called Peru
- Andean Renaissance
- Democratic Force
- Democratic Reconstruction
- Independent Moralizing Front
- Let's Make Progress Peru
- National Justice
- Peru Now
- Peruvian Resurgence
- Project Country
- With Force Peru

=== Since the 2011 general election ===
- Cambio 90
- Decentralist Social Force Party (merged with Citizens for Change)
- Forward
- Justicie, Technology, and Ecology
- National Awakening
- National Force
- National Renewal
- New Left Movement
- New Majority
- Radical Change
- Sí Cumple

=== Since the 2016 general election ===
- Hope Front
- Order
- Peru Progressing
- Possible Peru

=== Since the 2021 general election ===
- All for Peru
- Broad Front for Justice, Life and Freedom
- Contigo (formerly Peruvians for Change)
- Let's Go Peru
- National Victory (formerly National Restoration)
- National United Renaissance (formerly Always Together)
- Peruvian Nationalist Party
- Peru Secure Homeland
- Union for Peru

== Historical political parties ==
- Civilista Party (Partido Civil)
- Decentralist Party
- Decentralist Party of the South
- Democrat Party
- Democratic Party (Partido Demócrata)
- Democratic Vanguard Party
- Independent Civil Party
- Labour Party of Peru
- Liberal Party (Partido Liberal del Perú)
- National Alliance
- National Civic Union
- National Union (Unión Nacional)
- National Party (Partido Nacional)
- National Integration Party
- National Renewal Movement
- Nationalist Party of Peru (Eguiguren)
- Nationalist Party of Peru (Revilla)
- Odriíst National Union (Unión Nacional Odriísta)
- Peruvian Democratic Union
- Regionalist National Party of the Centre
- Republican Party of Peru
- Revolutionary Democratic Action
- Revolutionary Vanguard (Political-Military)
- Urban Rural Trade Unionist Party of Peru

== Former Coalitions ==
- Popular Action-Christian Democracy Alliance (Alianza Acción Popular-Democracia Cristiana)
- APRA-UNO Coalition (Coalición APRA-UNO)
- United Left (Izquierda Unida)
- Democratic Convergence (Convergencia Democrática)
- Socialist Left (Socialist Left)
- Democratic Front (Frente Democrático, FREDEMO)
- Peru 2000 (Perú 2000)
- National Unity (Unidad Nacional)
- Alliance for the Future (Alianza por el Futuro)
- Center Front (Frente de Centro)
- Decentralization Coalition (Concertación Descentralista)
- Alliance for the Great Change (Alianza por el Gran Cambio)
- Possible Peru Alliance (Alianza Electoral Perú Posible)
- Popular Alliance (Alianza Popular)
- Alliance for the Progress of Peru (Alianza para el Progreso del Perú)
- National Solidarity Alliance (Alianza Solidaridad Nacional)

== Armed rebel groups ==
- Revolutionary Left Movement (Movimiento de la Izquierda Revolucionaria)
- Shining Path (also known as Partido Comunista del Perú – Sendero Luminoso)
- Túpac Amaru Revolutionary Movement (Movimiento Revolucionario Túpac Amaru)
- Militarized Communist Party of Peru (Militarizado Partido Comunista del Perú)

== See also ==
- Politics of Peru
- List of political parties by country
- Liberalism in Peru
