= 1995 Peruvian general election =

- 9 April 1995
- Presidential election
- Turnout: 73.85% (▼4.42pp)
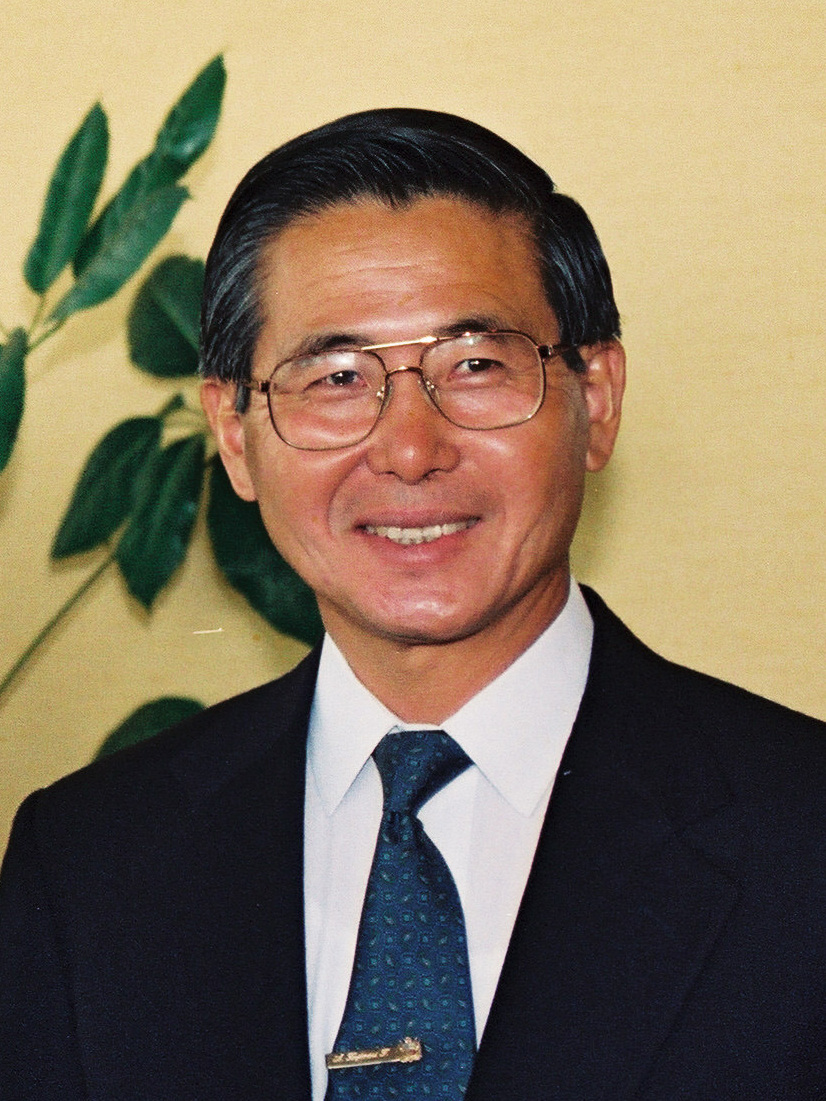

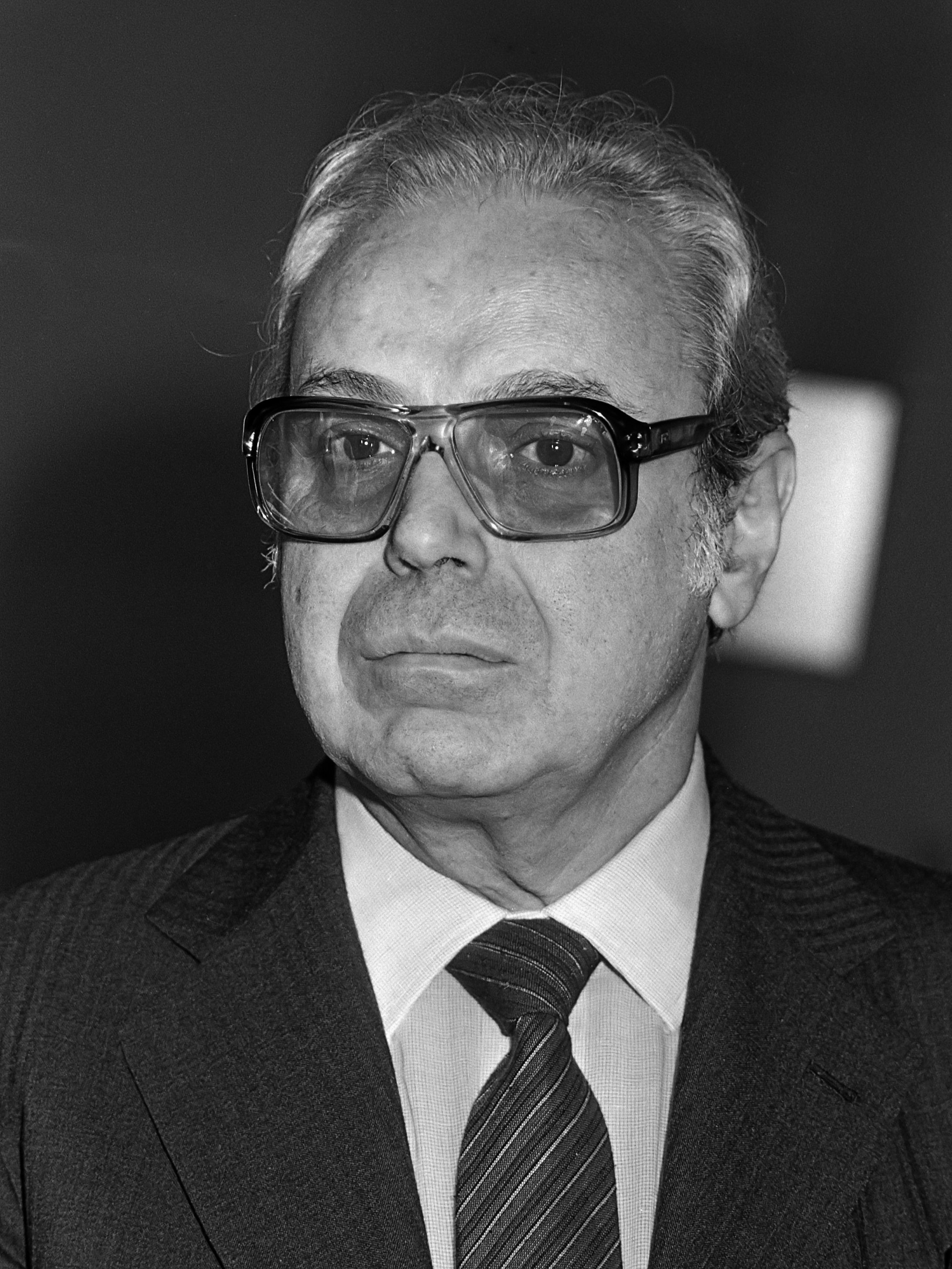
| Nominee | Alberto Fujimori | Javier Pérez de Cuéllar |
| Party | C90–NM | UPP |
| Running mate | Ricardo Márquez; César Paredes | Hilda Fernández; Guido Pennano |
| Popular vote | 4,798,515 | 1,624,566 |
| Percentage | 64.42% | 21.81% |
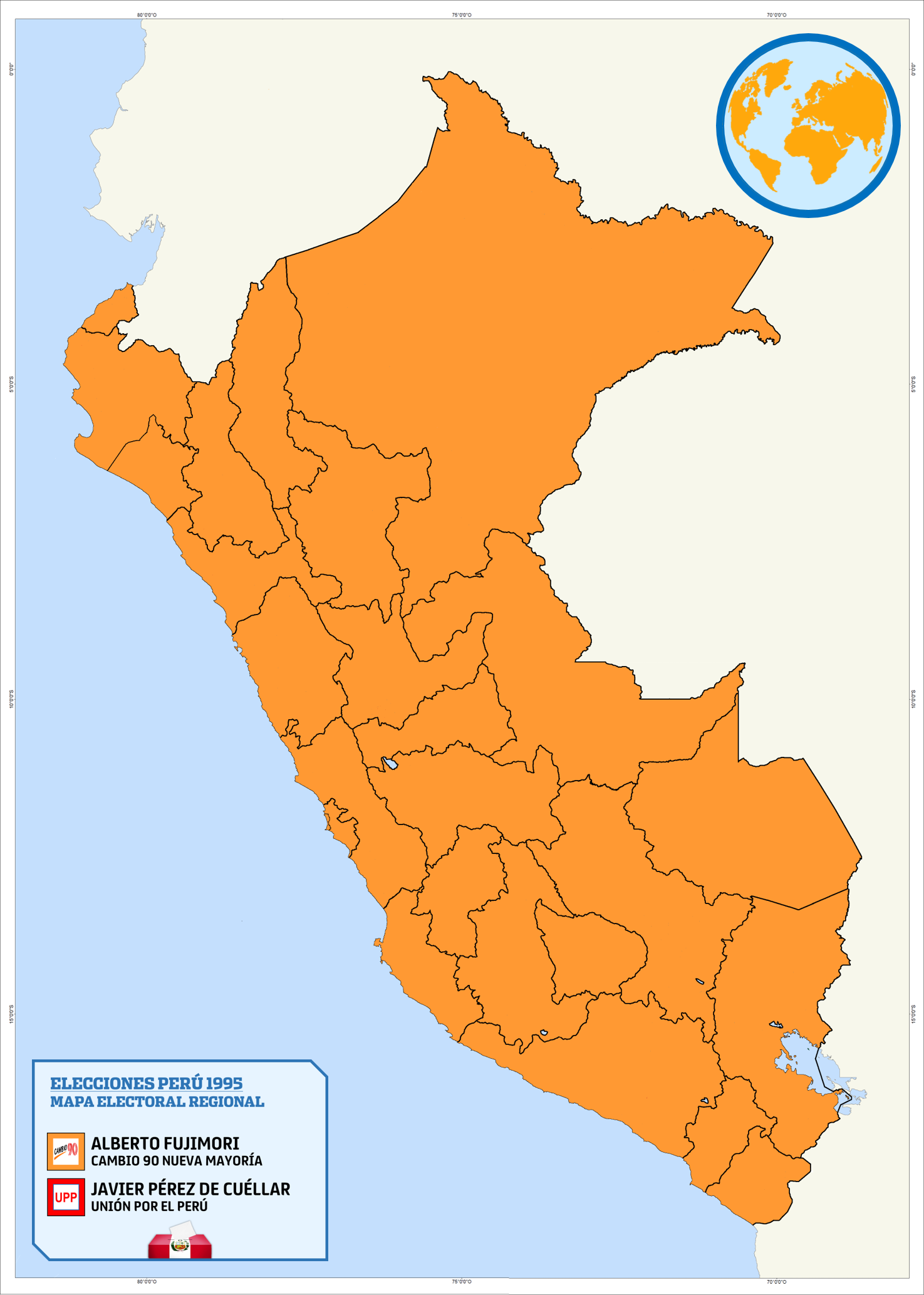
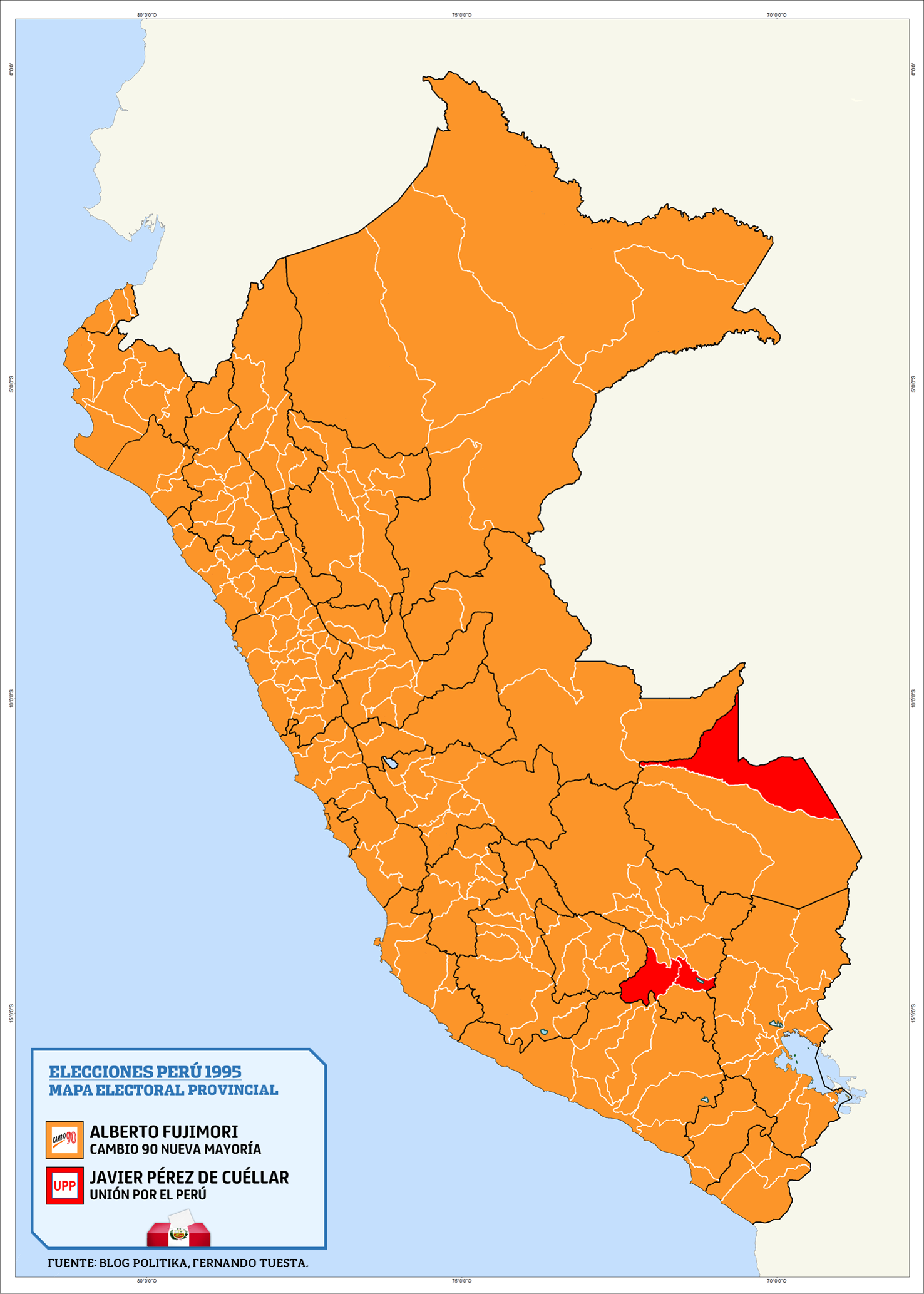
- Results by department (left) and province (right)
President before election
Alberto Fujimori
C90–NM
Elected President
Alberto Fujimori
C90–NM
- Congressional election
- All 120 seats in the Congress of Peru; 61 seats needed for a majority
| Party | Leader | Vote % | Seats | +/– |
|---|---|---|---|---|
| C90–NM | Alberto Fujimori | 52.10 | 67 | +23 |
| UPP | Javier Pérez de Cuéllar | 14.00 | 17 | New |
| APRA | Agustín Mantilla | 6.53 | 8 | +8 |
| FIM | Fernando Olivera | 4.89 | 6 | −1 |
| CODE-PC | Alejandro Toledo | 4.15 | 5 | New |
| Popular Action | Fernando Belaúnde | 3.34 | 4 | +4 |
| PPC | Luis Bedoya Reyes | 3.09 | 3 | −5 |
| Renewal | Rafael Rey | 2.98 | 3 | −3 |
| OBRAS | Ricardo Belmont | 2.00 | 2 | New |
| United Left | A. Haya de la Torre | 1.88 | 2 | +2 |
| FREPAP | Ezequiel Ataucusi | 1.08 | 1 | −1 |
| FRENATRACA | Roger Cáceres | 1.07 | 1 | −2 |
| MIA | Rolando Salvatierra | 0.79 | 1 | New |
This lists parties that won seats. See the complete results below.

General elections were held in Peru on 9 April 1995, the first under the 1993 constitution. Incumbent President Alberto Fujimori was easily re-elected with 64.4% of the vote defeating former UN Secretary General Javier Pérez de Cuéllar, whilst his Cambio 90-New Majority alliance won a majority of seats in the newly unicameral Congress.

== Results ==
=== President ===
| Candidate | Party | Votes | % |
|---|---|---|---|
| Alberto Fujimori | Cambio 90 – New Majority | 4,798,515 | 64.42 |
| Javier Pérez de Cuéllar | Union for Peru | 1,624,566 | 21.81 |
| Mercedes Cabanillas | American Popular Revolutionary Alliance | 306,108 | 4.11 |
| Alejandro Toledo | Possible Country | 241,598 | 3.24 |
| Ricardo Belmont | National Civic Movement OBRAS | 192,261 | 2.58 |
| Raúl Diez Canseco | Popular Action | 122,383 | 1.64 |
| Ezequiel Ataucusi | Agricultural People's Front of Peru | 57,556 | 0.77 |
| Agustín Haya de la Torre | United Left | 42,686 | 0.57 |
| Luis Cáceres Velásquez | National Front of Workers and Peasants | 25,017 | 0.34 |
| Sixtilio Dalmau | New Peru Movement | 9,999 | 0.13 |
| Víctor Echegaray | Reformist Party of Peru | 9,105 | 0.12 |
| Edmundo Inga | Alternative Peru Puma | 7,006 | 0.09 |
| Miguel Campos | Peace and Development | 6,337 | 0.09 |
| Carlos Cruz | Independent Front of National Reconciliation | 5,249 | 0.07 |
| Total | | 7,448,386 | 100.00 |
| Valid votes | | 7,448,386 | 82.12 |
| Invalid/blank votes | | 1,621,258 | 17.88 |
| Total votes | | 9,069,644 | 100.00 |
| Registered voters/turnout | | 12,280,538 | 73.85 |
Source: JNE

=== Congress ===
| Party | Votes | % | Seats | +/– |
|---|---|---|---|---|
| Cambio 90 – New Majority | 2,277,423 | 52.10 | 67 | +35 |
| Union for Peru | 611,804 | 14.00 | 17 | New |
| American Popular Revolutionary Alliance | 285,526 | 6.53 | 8 | –45 |
| Independent Moralizing Front | 213,777 | 4.89 | 6 | –1 |
| Possible Country | 181,397 | 4.15 | 5 | New |
| Popular Action | 146,018 | 3.34 | 4 | –22 |
| Christian People's Party | 135,236 | 3.09 | 3 | –22 |
| Renewal Movement | 130,060 | 2.98 | 3 | New |
| National Civic Movement OBRAS | 87,252 | 2.00 | 2 | New |
| United Left | 82,061 | 1.88 | 2 | –14 |
| Agricultural People's Front of Peru | 46,990 | 1.08 | 1 | +1 |
| National Front of Workers and Peasants | 46,728 | 1.07 | 1 | –2 |
| Independent Agrarian Movement | 34,463 | 0.79 | 1 | New |
| New Peru Movement | 29,557 | 0.68 | 0 | New |
| Reformist Party of Peru | 13,102 | 0.30 | 0 | New |
| Alternative Peru Puma | 12,391 | 0.28 | 0 | New |
| Apertura para el Desarrollo Nacional | 10,752 | 0.25 | 0 | New |
| Independent Front of National Reconciliation | 10,314 | 0.24 | 0 | New |
| Independent Inca Movement | 9,598 | 0.22 | 0 | New |
| Social Independent Movement | 6,588 | 0.15 | 0 | New |
| Total | 4,371,037 | 100.00 | 120 | –60 |
| Valid votes | 4,371,037 | 53.11 | | |
| Invalid/blank votes | 3,859,209 | 46.89 | | |
| Total votes | 8,230,246 | 100.00 | | |
| Registered voters/turnout | 12,280,538 | 67.02 | | |
Source: PDBA, JNE
