= 2026 Peruvian post-electoral crisis =

Political crisis in Peru

2026 Peruvian post-election crisis
- Part of 2026 Peruvian general election and the Peruvian political crisis
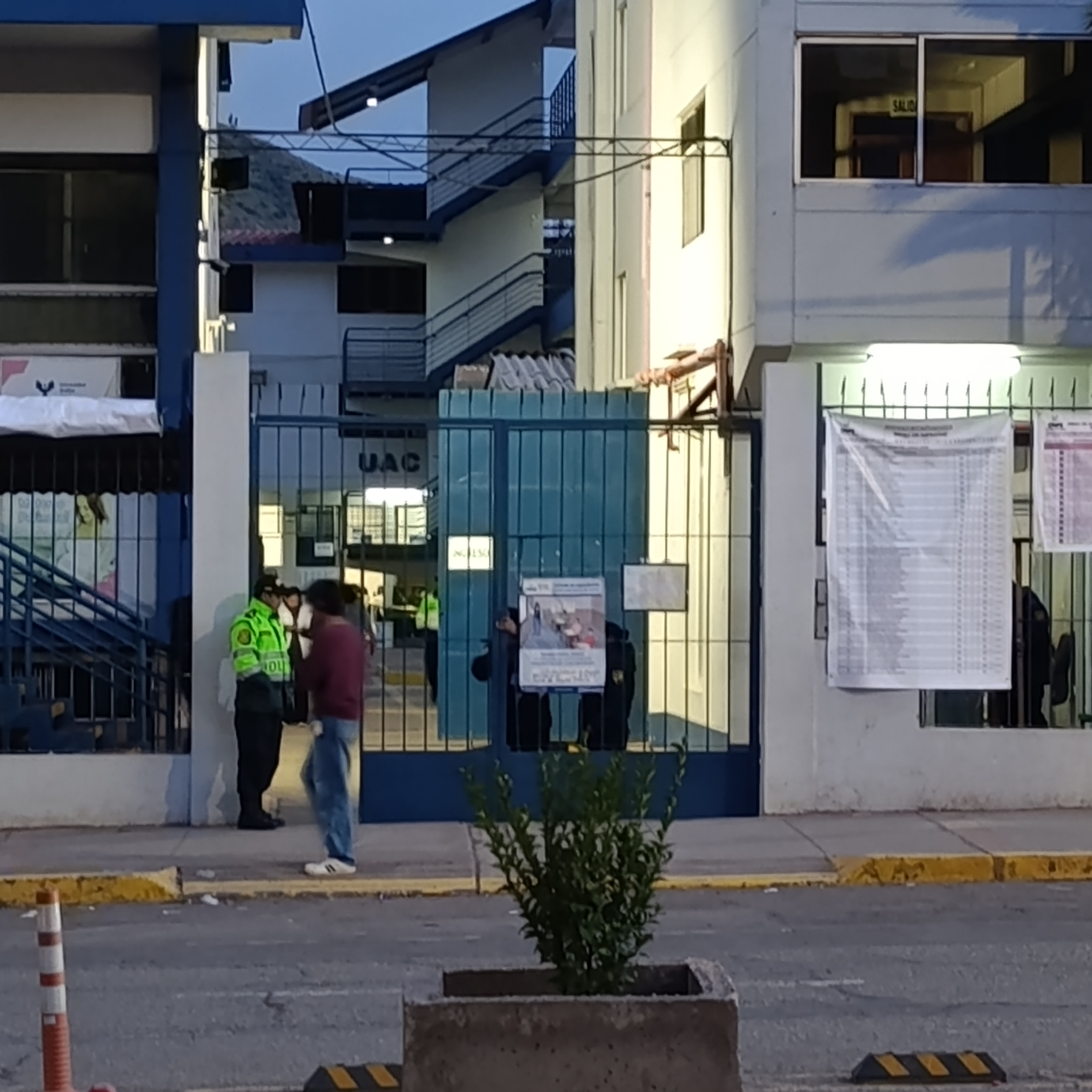
- A voting location with extended hours on 12 April 2026
- Date: 12 April 2026 – 30 June 2026; Phase I: 12 April 2026 – 15 May 2026 (32 or 33 days); Phase II: 7 June 2026 – 30 June 2026 (12 days)
- Location: Peru
- Result: First round vote counting completed on 15 May; Mass demonstrations summoned by Rafael López Aliaga; Second round vote counting completed on 29/30 June

A political crisis emerged following the first round of the 2026 Peruvian general election. It originated from delays by the National Office of Electoral Processes (ONPE) in distributing electoral materials to Lima voting centers, a task for which the contractor "Servicios Generales Galaga" was responsible. The delays prompted accusations of electoral fraud by far-right Popular Renewal candidate Rafael López Aliaga, along with calls for mass mobilization and protests. International observers and Peruvian authorities dismissed the claims, and López Aliaga was later criminally charged for the alleged incitement of civil disorder.

== Events ==
=== Preparations ===
A company named Galaga was contracted by the ONPE to distribute voting material to polling stations. Ahead of the elections, the Comptroller General of Peru had warned the head of the ONPE on 24 March 2026 of risks in the distribution of election materials and that this situation could affect the conduct of the elections. It was reported that Galaga had been penalized by the ONPE on three previous occasions. On 25 March 2025, President Dina Boluarte called general elections for 12 April 2026. The draw for polling station members took place on 30 January 2026. Thirty-six political parties registered for the elections, although the death of candidate Napoleón Becerra of the Workers' and Entrepreneurs' Party of Peru in an accident led to the invalidation of his presidential ticket.

=== Election day ===
At the start of Election Day on 12 April, delays began to be reported in the opening of polling stations, leading to long lines and public discontent, given that voting was scheduled to begin at 7:00. Delays in setting up polling stations were reported in six districts of Metropolitan Lima. In response to the complaints, the ONPE issued a statement indicating that the company responsible for transporting electoral material had not complied with the contract and did not have the necessary vehicles. It was reported that 75 polling places had been affected by the delay. ONPE spokesperson Juan Heredia stated that polling station would be set up by noon and that voting would conclude at 17:00. The political party Fuerza Popular issued a statement requesting an extension of voting hours or the holding of complementary elections for those affected. Rafael López Aliaga, for his part, filed a complaint against Piero Corvetto, head of ONPE, and requested the immediate intervention of the National Prosecutor's Office and his arrest, while Jorge Nieto Montesinos, candidate for the Party of Good Government, warned of the impact of the unmanned polling stations and the effect they could have, questioning both ONPE and the National Jury of Elections (JNE) in a post where he said: "Do you realize how irresponsible you are?"

However, due to the ongoing delay, the ONPE announced that polling stations would remain open until 14:00 and that voting would conclude at 18:00. Corvetto offered his apologies, and the ONPE announced that it would initiate legal and criminal proceedings against Galaga, while also agreeing to be investigated itself. At the same time, the Provincial Prosecutor’s Office for Crime Prevention, led by Prosecutor Lorena Villanueva, and the Anti-Corruption Division (DIRCOCOR) of the National Police of Peru (PNP) arrived at the ONPE headquarters to begin proceedings. It was also reported that the police raided Galaga’s headquarters.

=== Voting extension ===
Despite the extended hours, the ONPE reported that 99.8% of the total polling stations were successfully set up, but that 211 polling stations corresponding to 15 voting locations in San Juan de Miraflores, Lurín, and Pachacamac could not be opened, meaning that more than 63,000 voters were unable to cast their ballots. Following this, the Ombudsman’s Office issued a statement urging the JNE to extend the elections for those affected to 13 April, noting that these voters represented 0.2% of the total. It was later revealed that 52,000 voters had been unable to vote on 12 April. Following this, the JNE plenary announced the extension of the elections for those affected to 13 April. Roberto Burneo, head of the JNE, stated that this was a measure taken in response to the deficiencies that had arisen.

== Investigations ==
On 13 April, José Samamé Blas, the ONPE’s electoral management director, was arrested by the police on charges of alleged dereliction of duty, refusal to perform official duties, or delay in performing official duties; this arrest took place after he submitted his resignation to Corvetto, acknowledging responsibility for what had occurred. Before the police, Samamé stated that the person responsible for the breach of contract regarding the distribution of election materials was Juan Phang Sánchez, deputy manager of election production. Samamé explained that his role involved managerial duties, but that Phang was in charge of monitoring and supervising compliance with the contract between Galaga and the ONPE. He also explained that although he authorized the contract with Galaga, it was Phang’s responsibility to verify that the service was fulfilled. Journalist Karla Ramírez revealed a document signed by Samamé and Phang specifying that the contractor must have 40 vehicles and present two insurance policies. It was noted that, despite prior objections, the contract was awarded even though Galaga had submitted the most expensive bid compared to Hermes and Consorcio AFE, with Galaga proposing a total of 6,368,332 soles, Hermes 5,898,928 soles, and AFE 6,200,184 soles.

El Comercio revealed that the ONPE used a "criterion" to select Galaga, even though the two remaining companies had filed a notarized document questioning that "criterion," which pertained to the method of calculating the cubic meter capacity of the vehicles. For its part, the JNE filed criminal charges against Corvetto and four other officials, arguing that Corvetto had prior knowledge of a logistics crisis but failed to inform the JNE in a timely manner. The other officials charged were: Eduard Alarcón, accused of failing to properly supervise the logistics contract; Ricardo Saavedra, head of electoral organization and accused of failing to ensure the stability of the technological system or connectivity; Samamé; and Juan Alvarado Pfuyo, Galaga’s legal representative. Congressman Edwin Martínez filed a constitutional complaint against Burneo at the same time that Congress summoned Corvetto to appear before the Oversight Committee. Galaga, meanwhile, issued a statement requesting that the ONPE apologize for holding them responsible for what had occurred and denied that they had failed to comply; rather, they argued, everything was carried out in accordance with the ONPE’s instructions. The National Board of Justice (JNJ) agreed in an extraordinary plenary session to initiate a preliminary investigation against Corvetto and requested that he submit his defense regarding the events within 10 days. Regarding the elections scheduled for that day, delays were reported, and election materials were transported via ride-hailing taxis. Meanwhile, candidates Carlos Álvarez of Country for All and Ricardo Belmont of the Civic Party OBRAS announced their retirement from politics.

On 14 April, Samamé was transferred to the headquarters of the Criminal Investigation Directorate (DIRINCRI) of the PNP. On the way, he asked that his family be treated with respect and stated that he would face the consequences of what had happened. Meanwhile, Corvetto appeared before Congress and admitted to administrative failures, though he ruled out any irregularities in the process. Burneo, who had also been summoned, did not attend. DIRCOCOR also summoned Corvetto to give his statement.

== Fraud claims ==
In the weeks leading up to the elections, El País reported that far-right presidential candidate Rafael López Aliaga had already began making claims of electoral fraud. According to La República, Rafael López Aliaga implemented a disinformation campaign to discredit the election, accusing electoral authorities of engaging in fraud. The newspaper reported that former police intelligence agents that were assisting López Aliaga's Popular Renewal party told journalists that a plan was organized by the party to remove head of the National Office of Electoral Processes (ONPE), Piero Corvetto and the head of the National Elections Board (JNE), Roberto Burneo, replacing them with sympathetic officials who would invalidate the election.

Following the voting extension, López Aliaga stated that a "fraud" had begun, claiming that in his view, what had happened was no coincidence, arguing that the affected areas were aligned with his Popular Renewal party. López Aliaga also claimed that the candidate Roberto Sánchez of Juntos por el Perú was preparing a "massive fraud" and that one million votes had been stolen from his campaign so that Sánchez could advance to the runoff. He also suggested that citizens in rural areas lacked the training to count ballots.

López Aliaga called for demonstrations on the night of 14 April in front of the JNE, alleging sabotage in the electoral process. During the demonstrations, López Aliaga stated that he would not accept it if he advanced to the second round, accused an alleged mafia of wanting to carry out a "ballot box stuffing" so that Keiko Fujimori would advance with a leftist to the second round because, he argued, anyone could beat Fujimori, even "a panettone," and called for demonstrations "if the fraud is carried out" and an "insurgency" if the elections were not annulled and Corvetto did not step down, giving a 24-hour deadline for annulment. El País reported that during the speech, López Aliaga made homophobic attacks and said he would rape Burneo, the head of the JNE, with a tortoise if he did not annul the elections.

In addition to his call for protests, López Aliaga offered 20,000 Peruvian soles to individuals who assisted his argument of electoral fraud being committed. Fujimori, who had previously offered her alliance with López Aliaga by avoiding political attacks, said that she would provide all representatives of her Popular Force party to assist López Aliaga in any potential fact finding. According to La República, this may have been an attempt by Fujimori to prevent Sánchez from advancing to the second round of elections. Sánchez reacted to López Aliaga's offer to pay those assisting his electoral fraud narrative by saying "If there are doubts about this process, they must be substantiated with evidence before the authorities, not by paying bribes."

After calling for an insurgency, López Aliaga faced criminal charges related to an alleged incitement of civil disorder from the Public Ministry of Peru. On 16 April 2026, two attorneys filed criminal charges against Rafael López Aliaga, accusing him of inciting an insurrection.

=== Reactions ===
President of Peru José María Balcázar, the Peruvian ombudsman and the Public Ministry of Peru ruled out any attempted fraud. The Attorney General Tomás Gálvez and the European Union Election Observation Mission also dismissed the allegations of fraud, noting that the election had proceeded normally despite delays that were described as “serious problems.” Gálvez stated that prosecutors deployed nationwide had reported incidents such as delays in opening polling stations, but there was no evidence of fraud. Election experts also dismissed López Aliaga's claims that an electoral fraud operation was planned. Hernán Chaparro of the Institute of Peruvian Studies stated, "All disinformation stems from a kernel of truth that lends it a sense of similarity, but there is no proof of the alleged intent to defraud. What there is proof of, however, are López Aliaga's activists spreading this information, trying to cast doubt on the transparency of the elections. ... There are political operatives feeding media outlets biased information to construct a news story." Attorney José Tello Alfaro described López Aliaga's claims as "a highly speculative narrative", concluding "There was no fraud here; what occurred was a serious irregularity. The incidents recorded during the voting are not evidence of electoral fraud."

Much of the far-right political elements supported the electoral fraud narrative. Presidential candidates Wolfgang Grozo of Integridad Democrática, Herbert Caller of the Patriotic Party of Peru , Álex Gonzales of the Green Democratic Party, and Francisco Diez-Canseco Távara of Peru Action requested the annulment of the election. Separately, Yonhy Lescano, the Cooperación Popular candidate, called for the annulment of the elections. Former president of Peru, José Jerí, who was removed by Congress for alleged misconduct, expressed his support for López Aliaga, saying "I hope he makes it to the second round."

Sánchez announced that he would respect the results, but would also call for protests if there were signs of fraud, while rejecting any fraud in his favor. Presidential candidate Alfonso López-Chau of Now Nation said that no fraud had occurred and called on respecting the results of the first round. Ronald Atencio, candidate of Venceremos (Peru), announced his support for Sánchez. Candidate Jorge Nieto Montesinos, meanwhile, criticized the use of the word "fraud" and challenged those who used it to prove it. Keiko Fujimori, the Fuerza Popular candidate, stated that she would not comment on Corvetto and that this was a matter for the JNJ, while Miguel Torres, the vice-presidential candidate for the same party, called Corvetto "inept" and declared that, as far as his party was concerned, there was no evidence of fraud.

==== Reported rape threats ====
"If you don’t declare this filth null and void, Mr. Burneo, get ready ... You’re going to get a big one. A huge tortoise so you’ll behave like a man. You know where I’m going to shove it. We’re going to shove the tortoise in you, you know exactly where."

— Rafael López Aliaga, 14 April 2026

Separately, various observers criticized the reported rape threats López Aliaga made towards JNE head Burneo. Adrián Lerner, an assistant history professor at the University of Cambridge, said that López Aliaga's statement to shove a tortoise into Burneo were rape threats. Human rights attorney Julissa Mantilla Falcón criticized López Aliaga's words, stating, "He stands on a platform shouting 'fraud' and threatens the president of the National Elections Board with sexual assault. Now he's offering to pay anyone who can give him proof of the fraud he supposedly knows for sure." Political analyst José Alejandro Godoy described the tortoise threat as "one of the worst insults I have ever heard from a politician in my entire life."

== External sources ==
- ONPE’s official election results website
- Democracy Action Lab — CDDRL Stanford University (2026-05-17). "Missing Voters: An Analysis of the Effects on Turnout of the Election Administration Delays in the 2026 Peru First Round Presidential Elections". Impacto Electoral. Democracy Action Lab — CDDRL, Stanford University.
- Dann, Christopher; Peña, Marcelo; Díaz-Cayeros, Alberto; Magaloni, Beatriz (2026-05-18). "Missing Voters? Evidence from Polling Station Delays in the 2026 Peruvian Elections" (PDF). Impacto Electoral. Democracy Action Lab, CDDRL, Stanford University.
- Asociación Civil Transparencia (14 April 2026). Informe Preliminar de Observación a Largo Plazo [Preliminary Long-Term Observation Report] (in Spanish). Lima: Asociación Civil Transparencia.
- Asociación Civil Transparencia (May 5th 2026). Segundo Informe de Observación Electoral [Second Election Observation Report] (in Spanish). Lima: Asociación Civil Transparencia.
- Peru. Defensoría del Pueblo (Office of the Ombudsman, May 11th, 2026). Informe de la supervisión de las elecciones generales 2026 : primera vuelta [Report on the Monitoring of the 2026 General Elections: First Round] (in Spanish). Ombudsman’s Report No. 274. Lima: Defensoría del Pueblo.
- Luna Amancio, Nelly (2026-04-26). "Desinformación electoral: la arquitectura detrás de la narrativa del fraude sin evidencia" [Electoral Disinformation: The Architecture Behind the Narrative of Fraud Without Evidence]. Ojo Público (in Spanish).
- Rojas, Mathieu (16 April 2026). “Autopsia Electoral ONPE 2026: Impacto de las Fallas Logísticas sobre el Ausentismo y los Resultados Electorales en Lima” ["ONPE 2026 Electoral Autopsy: Impact of Logistical Failures on Absenteeism and Electoral Results in Lima"] (in Spanish). Autopsiaelectoral.com. Ms.
- Jesús, Diego (2026-05-09). "Las mesas 900 y la geografía del voto" [Polling Stations 900 and the Geography of the Vote]. Epicentro TV (in Spanish).
- Faure, Matías [@mati_faure] (May 17th, 2026). “¿Cúanto afectó las demoras de Galaga a Rafael López-Aliaga?" [How much did Galaga's delays affect Rafael López-Aliaga?] (in Spanish). Post in X/Twitter.
