= Fausto Alvarado =

Peruvian lawyer, politician, and historian (1950–2019)

Minister of Justice
- In office 27 July 2002 – 16 February 2004
- President: Alejandro Toledo
- Prime Minister: Luis Solari; Beatriz Merino; Carlos Ferrero
- Preceded by: Fernando Olivera
- Succeeded by: Baldo Kresalja

Member of Congress
- In office 26 July 2001 – 26 July 2006
- Constituency: Lima

Member of the Chamber of Deputies
- In office 26 July 1990 – 5 April 1992
- Constituency: Lima

Personal details
- Born: Fausto Humberto Alvarado Dodero; 12 July 1950 Lima, Peru
- Died: 15 September 2019 (aged 69) Lima, Peru
- Party: Possible Peru (2011–2017); Independent Moralizing Front (1995–2007); Solidarity and Democracy (1990–1992)
- Spouse: María Leticia Aggiuro Martín
- Children: Claudia Alvarado Aggiuro; Fausto Renato Alvarado Aggiuro
- Education: Leoncio Prado Military Academy; National University of San Marcos; Universidad del Pacífico; Pontifical Catholic University of Peru; Pablo de Olavide University
- Occupation: Lawyer, politician, historian

Fausto Humberto Alvarado Dodero (12 July 1950 – 15 September 2019) was a Peruvian lawyer, politician and historian. He was Congressman of the Republic (1990–1992 and 2001–2006) and Minister of Justice (2002–2004).

== Early life and education ==
He studied high school at Leoncio Prado Military Academy. He then entered the Faculty of Law and Political Science of the National University of San Marcos. He received a lawyer and graduated from a degree. He obtained his master's degree in economics from the Universidad del Pacífico and his master's degree in history with a major in Andean Studies from the Pontifical Catholic University of Peru. He later received a PhD in History of the Americas from the Pablo de Olavide University of Seville.

== Political career ==
He was a member of the Solidarity and Democracy (SODE) party, of which he was president (1988–1994). He nominated the Chamber of Deputies in the general elections of 1990, being elected as Deputy of the Republic by Lima Provinces; however, his parliamentary work was interrupted by the closure of Congress in April 1992.

Then he joined the Independent Moralizing Front (IMF) led by Fernando Olivera Vega. In the 2001 general election he was elected Congressman of the Republic with 39,341 votes. As such, he presided over the Irregular Influence Investigation Commission exercised during the administration of Alberto Fujimori over the Judiciary, the Public Ministry and other State Powers and Institutions related to the Administration of Justice.

On 27 July 2002, he was appointed Minister of Justice by President Alejandro Toledo; as such, he carried out a modernization of the justice sector, among his achievements the awarding in favor of the General Archive of the Nation of the old post office of the Central Post, the issuance of the Criminal Procedure Code (President of the Review Commission), the creation of CERIAJUS (Special Commission for Integral Reform of the Administration of Justice), the elaboration of the National Penitentiary Treatment Plan and the Recommendations for Legal Physical Sanitation and Informal Property Titling. As well as the signing of the UN International Convention for the fight against corruption.

In February 2004, he resigned from the position of Minister of Justice, after which he returned to his work as a congressman, being elected First Vice President of Congress in the period 2005–2006.

In the 2011 Peruvian general election, he participated in the technical team of Possible Peru of Alejandro Toledo.

== Works ==
- A propósito de la Constitución de Cádiz de 1812. Los conceptos políticos más importantes (2012)
- La historiografía y los centenarios de las repúblicas sanmartinianas. Argentina, Chile y Perú (2011)
- A propósito de Viscardo y Guzmán. Tiempos de vida. Emancipación e Independencia. Historia conceptual (2013)
- Virreinato o Colonia. Historia conceptual. España-Perú. Siglos XVI, XVII y XVIII (Lima: Fondo Editorial del Congreso del Perú, 2013)
