= Civic Party OBRAS =

Civic Party OBRAS Partido Cívico OBRAS
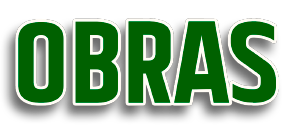
- Abbreviation: OBRAS
- President: Ricardo Belmont
- General Secretary: Daniel Barragán
- Founder: Ricardo Belmont
- Founded: 8 July 1989
- Registered: 15 July 2024
- Membership (2026): 43,265
- Ideology: Populism; Nationalism; Social conservatism Anti-Fujimorism
- Political position: Centre to centre-left
- Colours: Dark green
- Chamber of Deputies: 15 / 130
- Senate: 5 / 60
- Andean Parliament: 1 / 5
- Governorships: 0 / 25
- Regional Councillors: 0 / 274
- Province Mayorships: 0 / 196
- District Mayorships: 0 / 1,874

Website
- partidopoliticocivicoobras.com

The Civic Party OBRAS (Spanish: Partido Cívico OBRAS; lit. 'Works'), formerly known as the Independent Civic Movement OBRAS (Spanish: Movimiento Cívico Independiente OBRAS), is a Peruvian centre-left nationalist political party founded on 9 July 1989 and currently led by Ricardo Belmont.

After the 1995 general election, the party did not participate in any elections and consequently lost its registration. However, after completing the re-registration process, OBRAS regained its electability on 15 July 2024.

== History ==
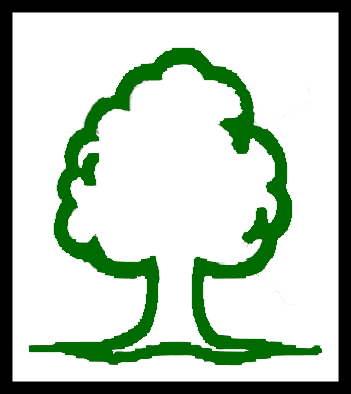
The party logo when it was called Independent Civic Movement OBRAS

Belmont was his OBRAS party's candidate in the 1995 presidential election, but received only 2% of the vote. In the Congress of the Republic, OBRAS won two seats out of 120.

In the 2006 general election, Belmont was an independent candidate on the Centre Front list of Valentín Paniagua, but failed to secure a seat. However, in 2009, he entered Congress as a replacement following the death of congressman Alberto Andrade, the former mayor of Lima.

In 2015, OBRAS formed an alliance with the Siempre Unidos party, and in 2016 with Peru Secure Homeland, with the aim of participating in the 2016 presidential election; however, this alliance ended with the withdrawal of candidate Renzo Reggiardo.

In the 2018 Lima municipal election, OBRAS ran within the Libertarian Peru (PL) party, with Belmont as the mayoral candidate, receiving 3.89% of the vote.

In 2020, Belmont and his movement joined the ethnocacerist Union for Peru, becoming the number one candidate on the Lima UPP list in the snap congressional election.

That same year, with the onset of the COVID-19 pandemic, Belmont began organizing COVID-19 denialist marches and promoting anti-vaccination slogans such as "Every vaccine you take [...] could make you infertile."

In 2021, Belmont again allied with Free Peru, becoming an adviser to President Pedro Castillo. Despite the fact that a week before his appointment, Belmont described Castillo as "another one of those who ends up in jail or gets rich and flees the country."

In July 2024, the party was re-registered with the National Jury of Elections to participate in the next general election.

Belmont, the party leader, has become OBRAS's presidential candidate for the 2026 election. In his campaign, Belmont typically wears a Spartan warrior helmet, and his supporters refer to themselves as "Spartans".

During Belmont's OBRAS campaign, the party adopted some ideas from the government of Andrés Manuel López Obrador, former President of Mexico, such as the "Abrazos, no balazos" policy and the implementation of a government conference system similar to "Las Mañaneras del Pueblo" as its main proposals

== Election results ==
=== Presidential ===
Election	Candidate	First round		Second round		Result
Election	Candidate	Votes	%	Votes	%	Result
1995	Ricardo Belmont	192,261	2.58	—N/a		Lost ✗
2000	Did not participate					
2001	Fernando Olivera (FIM)	1,044,207	9.85	—N/a		Lost ✗
2006	Valentín Paniagua (FC)	706,156	5.75	—N/a		Lost ✗
2011	Did not participate					
2016	Renzo Reggiardo (PPS)	Withdrawn				Lost ✗
2021	José Vega (UPP)	101,267	0.70	—N/a		Lost ✗
2026	Ricardo Belmont	1,698,903	10.15	—N/a		Lost ✗

=== Congressional ===
==== Unicameral Congress of the Republic ====
Election	Leader	Votes	%	Seats	+/–	Rank	Government
1995	Ricardo Belmont	87,252	2.00	2 / 120		9th	Opposition
2000	Ricardo Belmont	Did not participate					
2001	Ricardo Belmont	1,034,672 (FIM)	10.98 (FIM)	0 / 120		4th (FIM)	Extra-parliamentary
2006	Ricardo Belmont	760,261 (FC)	7.07 (FC)	0 / 120		5th (FIM)	Extra-parliamentary
2011	Ricardo Belmont	Did not participate					
2016	Ricardo Belmont	Did not participate					
2020	Ricardo Belmont	Did not participate					
2021	Ricardo Belmont	266,349 (UPP)	2.07 (UPP)	0 / 130		13 (FC)	Extra-parliamentary

==== Chamber of Deputies ====
Election	Leader	Votes	%	Seats	+/–	Rank	Government
2026	Ricardo Belmont	1,199,888	8.32	14 / 130	▲14	▲6th	Opposition

==== Senate ====
Election	Leader	Votes	%	Seats	+/–	Rank	Government
2026	Ricardo Belmont	1,307,340	8.84	5 / 60		▲5th	Opposition

=== Andean Parliament ===
Election	Leader	Votes	%	Seats	+/–	Rank
2026	Ricardo Belmont	1,274,086	9.52	1 / 5	▲1	6th

=== Regional and municipal elections ===
Year	Regional governors	Provincial mayors	District mayors
Year	Outcome	Outcome	Outcome
1989		1 / 190	0 / 1,694
1993		1 / 191	22 / 1,694
2026	0 / 25	0 / 196	0 / 1,694
