= Alberto Kouri =

Peruvian politician (born 1959)

Member of the Congress of the Republic of Peru
- In office 27 July 2000 – 28 October 2000

Personal details
- Born: Luis Alberto Emilio Kouri Bumachar; 6 November 1959 Lima, Peru

Luis Alberto Emilio Kouri Bumachar (born November 6, 1959) is a Peruvian lawyer and former member of the Congress of the Republic of Peru during 2000. He is known for being the protagonist of the first widespread "vladi-video", which initiated the fall of Alberto Fujimori's government.

== Political career ==
Kouri began his political career in the municipal elections of 1998, where he was a candidate for mayor of the district of Magdalena del Mar for the independent list Magdalena Sí, but was not elected.

In the 2000 general elections, Kouri registered with Alejandro Toledo's Possible Peru party and ran for Congress, where he was elected congressman with 36,213 votes for the 2000-2005 parliamentary period. In June 2000, Kouri was elected congressman for the 2000–2005 term.

On 22 June of the same year, Kouri resigned from Possible Peru, justifying his decision by internal discrepancies. During the traditional date of the installation of the new legislature, on 28 July, Kouri, along with 18 other congressmen, joined the ranks of the ruling Peru 2000 party, which gave the political grouping a large majority. After this event, Kouri was criticised by the various opposition benches as a defector, as were the other 18 congressmen.

== Controversies ==
=== Vladivideo ===
On 14 September of that year, at a press conference at the Gran Hotel Bolívar, the then congressmen Fernando Olivera, Luis Iberico and Susana Higuchi, of the Independent Moralizing Front, presented a video recorded with a hidden camera showing Kouri receiving 15,000 dollars from Vladimiro Montesinos, presidential advisor and head of the National Intelligence Service (SIN), to leave Possible Peru and join the ranks of Peru 2000. In the VHS recording, later known as Kouri-Montesinos, the congressman-elect can be seen haggling for more money. The press conference was broadcast on Canal N while the Congress of the Republic was in session.

The "vladi-video" had been filmed on 5 May 2000 at the National Intelligence Service and Kouri defended himself against accusations of corruption and transfugism by claiming that the money received was a loan to buy a refrigerated truck to deliver fish to economically depressed areas, but days later, the Peru 2000 bench itself withdrew him from its ranks and called for him to be sanctioned. Subsequently, Kouri appeared on the news programmes 24 Horas and América Noticias to justify his meeting with Montesinos, where in the latter programme he was surprised to be wearing a hearing aid during the interview.

On 28 September 2000, the Congress of the Republic suspended Kouri for 120 days and then he was declared vacated and his post was replaced by Luis Pella Granda, however, Kouri had already fled to Miami. In January 2001, he was disqualified from holding any public office for 10 years and prosecuted by the Judiciary.

=== Judicial process ===
As a result of these events, he was prosecuted. During the trial, it became known that he had gone to the SIN to meet with Montesinos on two more occasions, receiving a total of 32,000 dollars. He was sentenced on 21 March 2001 to six years in prison for corruption of officials and illicit enrichment. He was also ordered to pay 200,000 nuevos soles to the Peruvian State as civil reparations. In 2004 he was acquitted of the crimes of influence peddling and illicit association to commit a crime. In 2004 he was acquitted of the crimes of trafficking in influence and illicit association to commit a crime.

In 2012, his assets were seized due to non-payment of the amount to which he was sentenced.

In 2015, he admitted that he had already decided to join Fujimorism before the interview with Montesinos. The following year, via his Twitter account, he continued to insist on his innocence.
