= Martina Portocarrero =

Peruvian folk singer and politician (1949–2022)

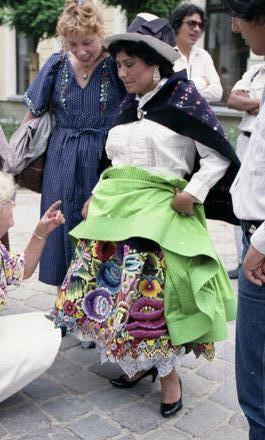
- Portocarrero in 1987
- Born: Leonila Martina Portocarrero Ramos; September 29, 1949; Nazca, Peru
- Died: April 22, 2022 (aged 72); Lausanne, Switzerland
- Occupations: Folk singer; cultural researcher; politician
- Known for: Huayno; muliza
- Political party: FREPAP; Broad Front; Free Peru

Martina Portocarrero (29 September 1949 – 22 April 2022) was a Peruvian folk singer, cultural researcher, and politician. She was an interpreter of huaynos and mulizas, as well as a researcher of Andean culture. Portocarrero was posthumously honored by the Peruvian government as Personalidad Meritoria de la Cultura (Meritorious Personality of Culture). During her political career, she ran unsuccessfully for various positions as a member of FREPAP, Broad Front, and Free Peru.

== Biography ==
Leonila Martina Portocarrero Ramos was born in Nazca, Peru, on 29 September 1949.

In 1970, she entered the Universidad Nacional de Música in Lima. She studied at the Escuela de Nacional de Arte Dramático, as well as at the National University of San Marcos, but it was in Switzerland where she graduated from university as an educator.

In the 1908s, she began her career as a soloist, performing huaynos throughout Peru. Around 1984, she traveled to Europe, introducing Latin American music in European festivals. In 1986, she settled in Switzerland and continued spreading the folklore and traditional art of Peru. Her interpretation of the Ayacucho huayno song "Flor de Retama", composed by Ricardo Dolorier, which refers to the Huanta student rebellion of 1969, was well known.

Portocarrero was twice a pre-candidate for the presidency of the Republic, in 2001 for FREPAP, withdrawing before the election, and in 2016, for Broad Front, being defeated in the internal elections by the anthropologist Verónika Mendoza. In 2006, Portocarrero was a candidate for mayor of Lima for the Union for Peru party, obtaining only 4.63% of the votes. In 2016 and 2020, Portocarrero ran for Congress for the Broad Front party. In 2021, she ran with the political party Free Peru but was excluded by the National Jury of Elections. Portocarrero formed her own political group, the Movimiento Político Cultural Mundo Verde. She was touted as a possible Ministro de Cultura del Perú (Minister of Culture) during the beginning of the governments of Ollanta Humala and Pedro Castillo.

Martina Portocarrero died on 22 April 2022, in Lausanne, Switzerland, as a result of lung cancer. In May 2022, the Peruvian government posthumously awarded her the recognition of Meritorious Personality of Culture.

== Discography ==
- 1982: Canto a la Vida. Stereo LP.001, Discos Retama
- 1987: Martina en vivo - Teatro Municipal. – Lima, CD Vol. 1
- 1993: Maíz. Discos Raymi, CD Vol. 2
- 2001: El Canto de las Palomas. CD Vol. 3, Retama producciones
- 2012: Carita de Manzana. Martina Portocarrero & Retama Producciones

== See also ==
- 2001 Peruvian general election
- 2011 Peruvian general election
- Andean culture (disambiguation)
