= Luis Cáceres =

Luis Cáceres is the name of:

- Luis Cáceres (footballer), Paraguayan footballer
- Luis Cáceres (politician), Peruvian politician

== See also ==
- Luisa Cáceres de Arismendi
