= Nationalist Party of Peru =

Nationalist Party of Peru may refer to:

- Nationalist Party of Peru (Revilla), a political party in Peru, founded by Clemente Revilla
- Peruvian Nationalist Party
