= National Civic Union =

National Civic Union may refer to any of several political parties:

- National Civic Union (Argentina) (1891–1916)
- National Civic Union (Bolivia) (1964)
- National Civic Union (Dominican Republic), a political party in the Dominican Republic (1962–1990)
- National Civic Union (Peru) (c. 1939–at least 1956)
