= Hope Front =

Hope Front may refer to:

- Lespwa, a Haitian political coalition, in French Front de l'Espoir (Hope Front)
- Hope Front (Peru), a Peruvian political party
