= Luis Cáceres Velásquez =

Peruvian politician (1930–2021)

Member of Congress
- In office 28 July 2000 – 27 July 2001
- Constituency: Lima

Mayor of Arequipa
- In office 1 January 1987 – 31 December 1992
- Preceded by: Luis Bragagnini
- Succeeded by: Sebastián Ramírez

Personal details
- Born: José Luis Cáceres Velásquez; 27 December 1930 Juliaca, Peru
- Died: 25 June 2021 (aged 90) Arequipa, Peru
- Party: National Front of Workers and Peasants (1968–1999); Agricultural People's Front of Peru (2000); Peru 2000 (2000); Radical Change (2011)

Luis Cáceres Velásquez (27 December 1930 – 25 June 2021) was a Peruvian politician who served as Mayor of Arequipa, Mayor of San Román and Congressman.

== Biography ==
He was born in Juliaca on 27 December 1930. He did his primary studies at the Colegio San Román de Juliaca and secondary at the Colegio San Francisco de Asís in Arequipa.

He began his political career in the National Front of Workers and Peasants.

In 1964 he was elected Provincial Mayor of San Román by the National Front of Workers and Peasants, being re-elected until 1983. In 1987 he ran for Mayor of Arequipa and was elected for the 1987–1989 period. In 1990 he was re-elected Mayor of Arequipa for the period 1990–1992. For 1993 municipal election he ran for mayor of Lima for Lima al 2000 party, however he was in second place after the reelection of Ricardo Belmont.

In 2000 general elections he ran for Congress for Agricultural People's Front of Peru and was elected Congressman for the period 2000–2005. After being elected Congressman, Cáceres Velásquez joined the ranks of Fujimorism as a turncoat, as was his son, who was also elected Congressman amid controversy and after the fall of the Fujimori regime, his parliamentary position was reduced until 2001.

In 2010, he presented himself as a candidate for the regional government of Arequipa, but his candidacy was denied. In 2011 general elections he ran for Congress on behalf of Arequipa for Radical Change, however he was not elected and failed to reach seats in Congress.

He died from COVID-19 in Arequipa on 25 June 2021, the age of 90.
