= Colegio Italiano Antonio Raimondi =

Private Italian International school

Coordinates: 12.073758°S 76.9562254°W

- Scuola italiana Antonio Raimondi

Location
- Avenida La Fontana 755; La Molina District; Lima, Lima province, 15024; Peru

Information
- Established: 1929; 97 years ago
- Website: raimondi.edu.pe

Colegio Italiano Antonio Raimondi is a private Italian international school in La Molina District, Lima, Peru. It has scuola infanzia (preschool) through secondaria II grado (upper secondary school).

It was established after two men, Giovanni Raffo and Fortunato Brescia, donated land for a school in 1929. It replaced an Italian school in Callao, Regina Margherita school, first established on June 3, 1872. Raimondi, the namesake of the current school, was one of the founders of the Margherita school. The current Raimondi building opened in 1996.

== Notable alumni ==
- Alberto Andrade, former mayor of Lima

== See also ==
- Italian Peruvian
