= 2001 Peruvian general election =

- Presidential election
- 8 April 2001 (first round); 3 June 2001 (second round)
- Turnout: 82.32% (first round) ▼0.51pp 81.41% (second round) ▲0.41pp
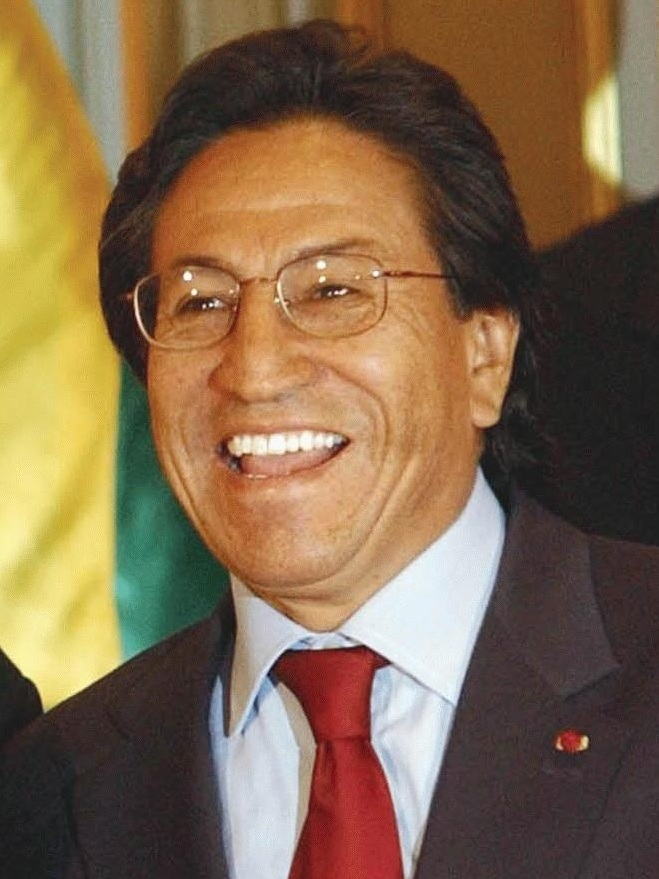

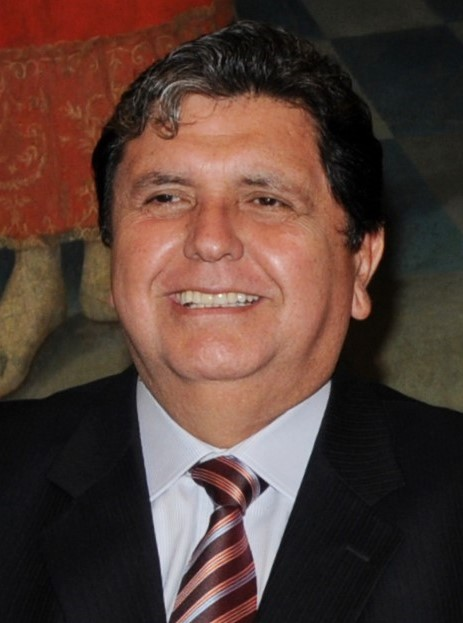
Nominee	Alejandro Toledo	Alan García
Party	Possible Peru	APRA
Running mate	Raúl Diez Canseco; David Waisman	José Murgia; Jorge del Castillo
Popular vote	5,548,556	4,904,929
Percentage	53.08%	46.92%
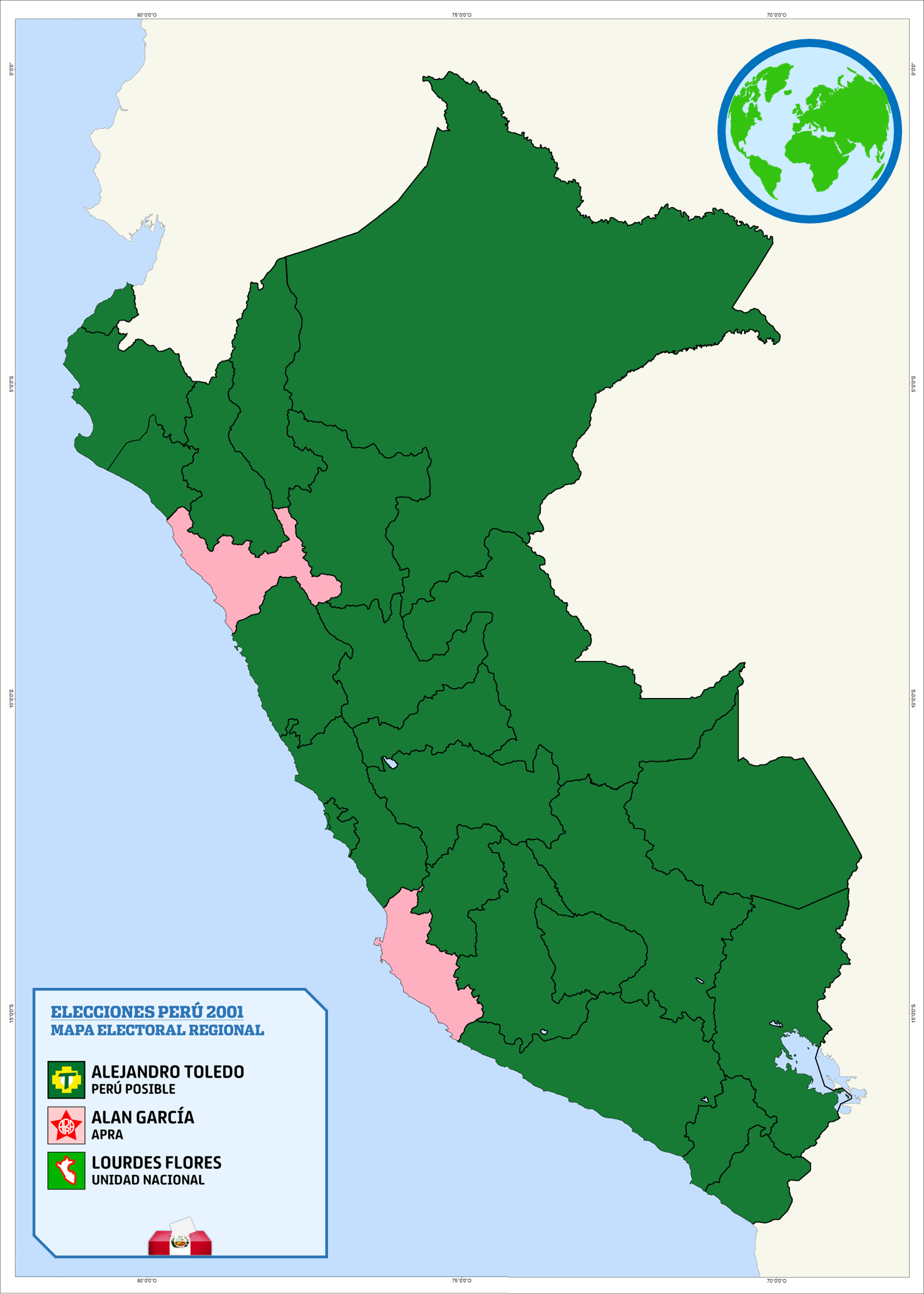
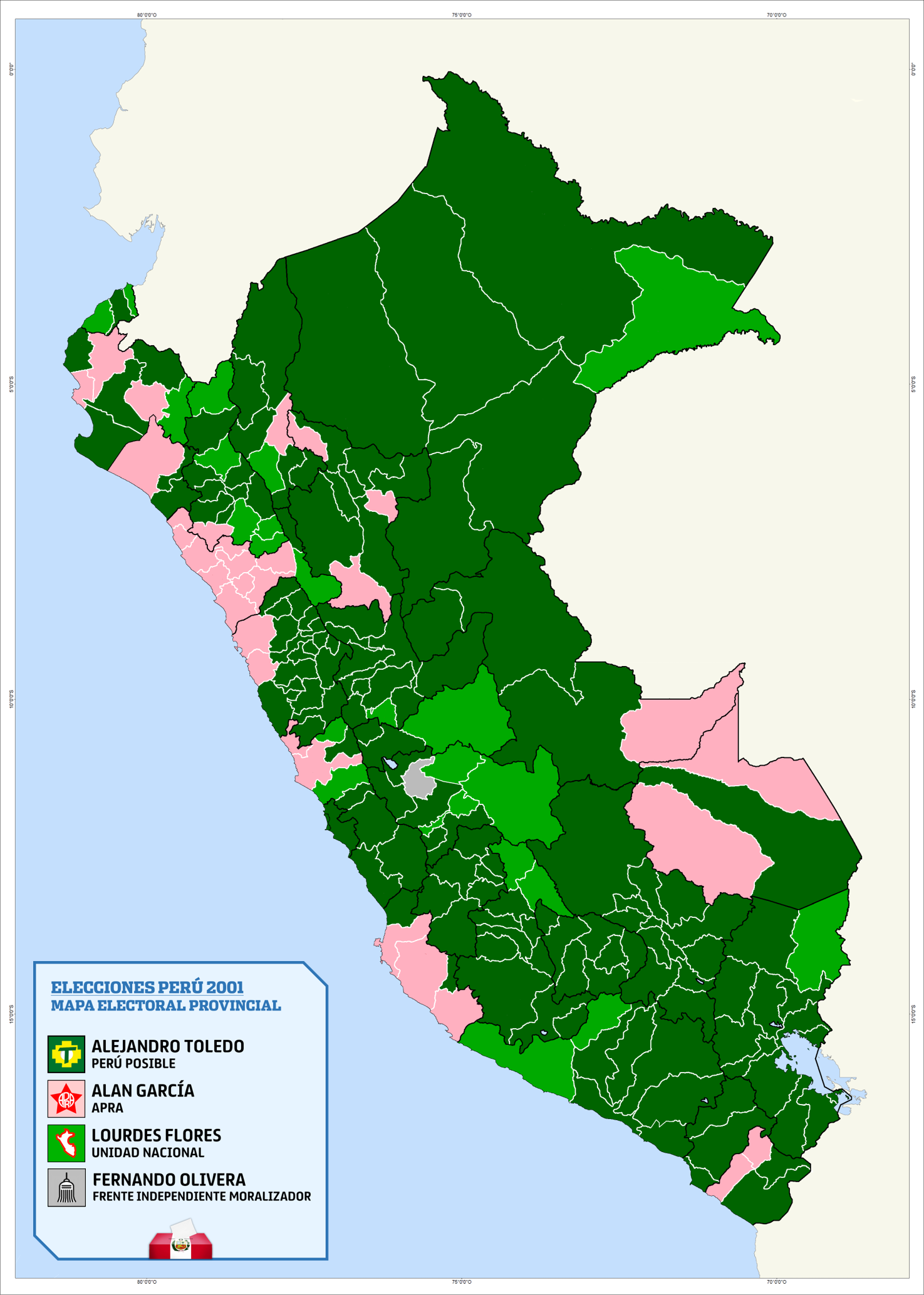
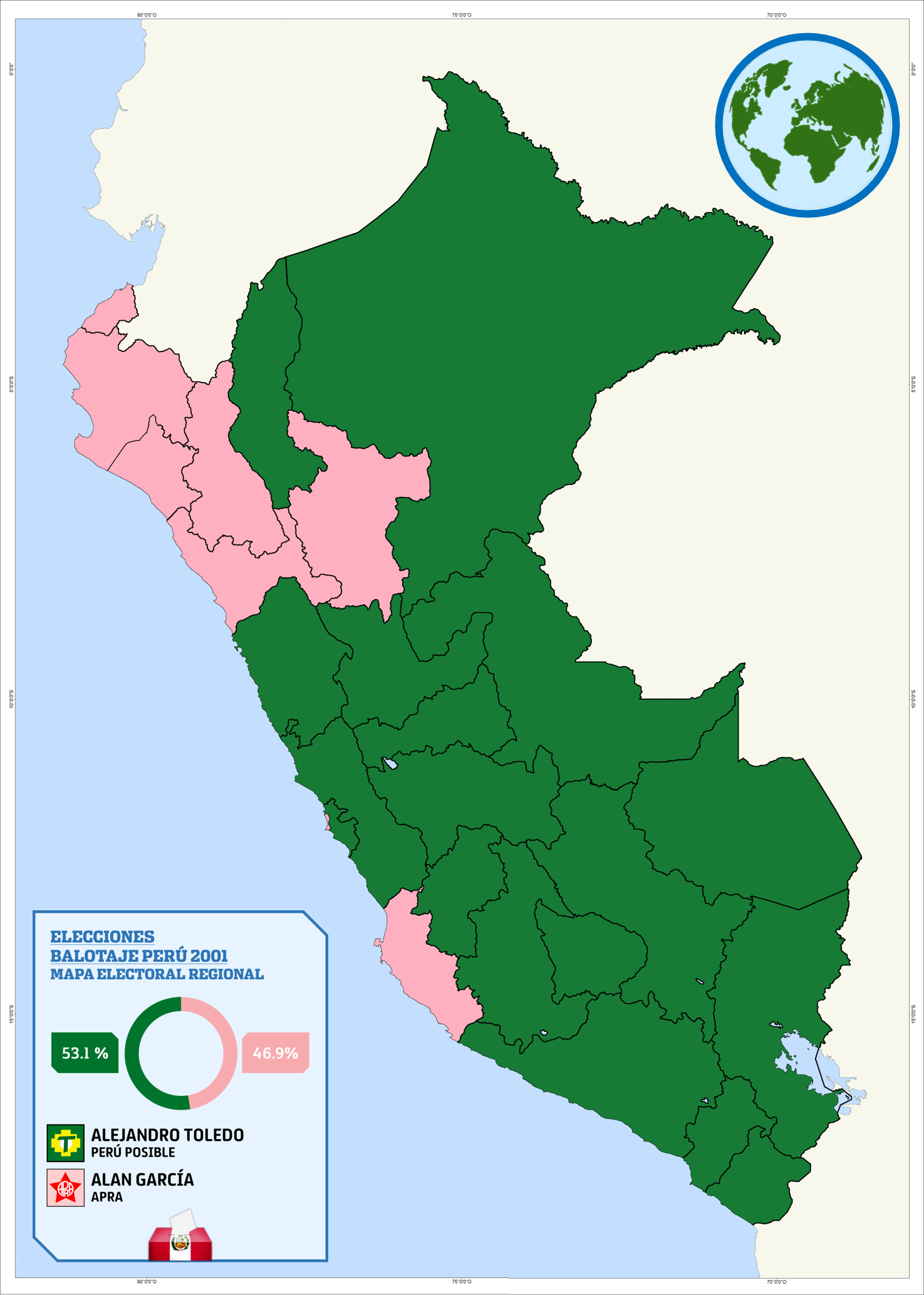
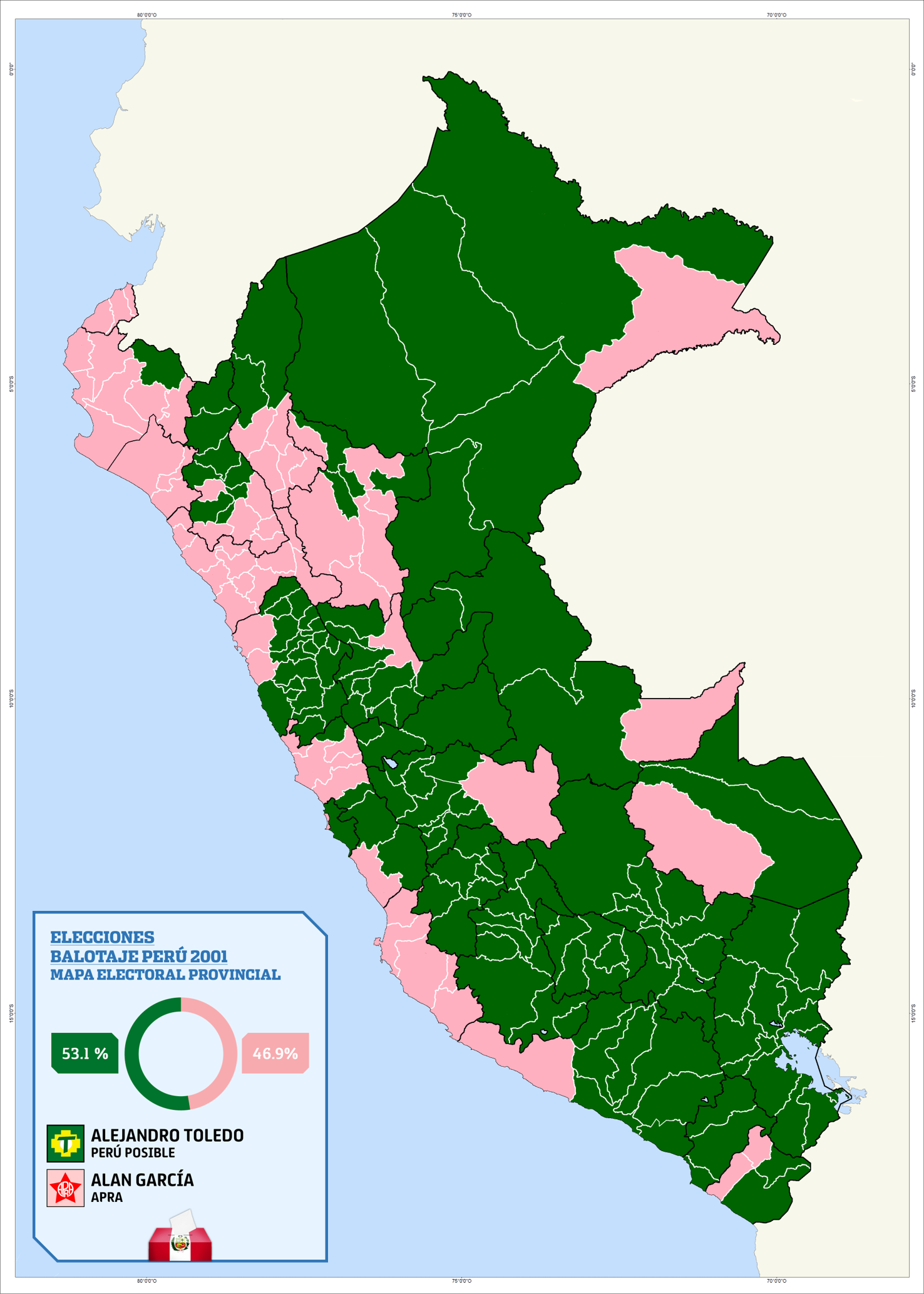
President before election
Valentín Paniagua
Popular Action
Elected President
Alejandro Toledo
Possible Peru
- Congressional election
- 8 April 2001
- All 120 seats in the Congress of Peru; 61 seats needed for a majority
Party	Leader	Vote %	Seats	+/–
Possible Peru	Alejandro Toledo	26.30	45	+16
APRA	Alan García	19.71	28	+22
National Unity	Lourdes Flores	13.84	17	+13
FIM	Fernando Olivera	10.98	11	+2
We Are Peru	Alberto Andrade	5.78	4	−5
C90-NM	Alberto Fujimori	4.80	3	−49
Popular Action	Fernando Belaúnde	4.18	3	0
UPP	Daniel Estrada	4.14	6	+3
People's Solution	Carlos Boloña	3.57	1	New
All for Victory	Ricardo Noriega	2.03	1	New
And. Renaissance	Ciro Gálvez	1.36	1	New
This lists parties that won seats. See the complete results below.
Results by department

Early general elections were held in Peru on 8 April 2001, with a second round of the presidential election on 3 June. The elections were held after President Alberto Fujimori claimed asylum in Japan during a trip to Asia and resigned his position.

The presidential elections were won by Alejandro Toledo of Possible Peru, who had been defeated by Fujimori in the 2000 general election, while his party emerged as the largest faction in the Congress.

== Candidates ==
=== Main presidential candidates ===
Presidential tickets
Possible Peru	Peruvian Aprista Party	National Unity	Independent Moralizing Front
Alejandro Toledo	Alan García	Lourdes Flores	Fernando Olivera
	President of Peru (1985–1990)	Member of Congress (1995-2000)	Member of Congress (1995-2001)
Possible Peru	Peruvian Aprista Party	National Unity	Independent Moralizing Front

=== Other candidates ===
- Carlos Boloña, economist and former Minister of Economy and Finance (1991-1993) – People's Solution
- Ciro Gálvez, lawyer and notary head – Andean Renaissance
- Marco Antonio Arrunátegui, economist – Project Country
- Ricardo Noriega, lawyer and economist – All for Victory

=== Voluntarily withdrawn ===
- Luis Castañeda, lawyer and former presidential nominee – National Solidarity
- Jorge Santistevan, lawyer and first national ombudsman – Independent Movement We Are Peru - Democratic Cause
- Hernando de Soto, economist – Popular Capital
- Víctor M. Marroquín, international lawyer – Youth Independent Movement
- Martina Portocarrero, folklore singer – Agricultural People's Front of Peru

== Results ==
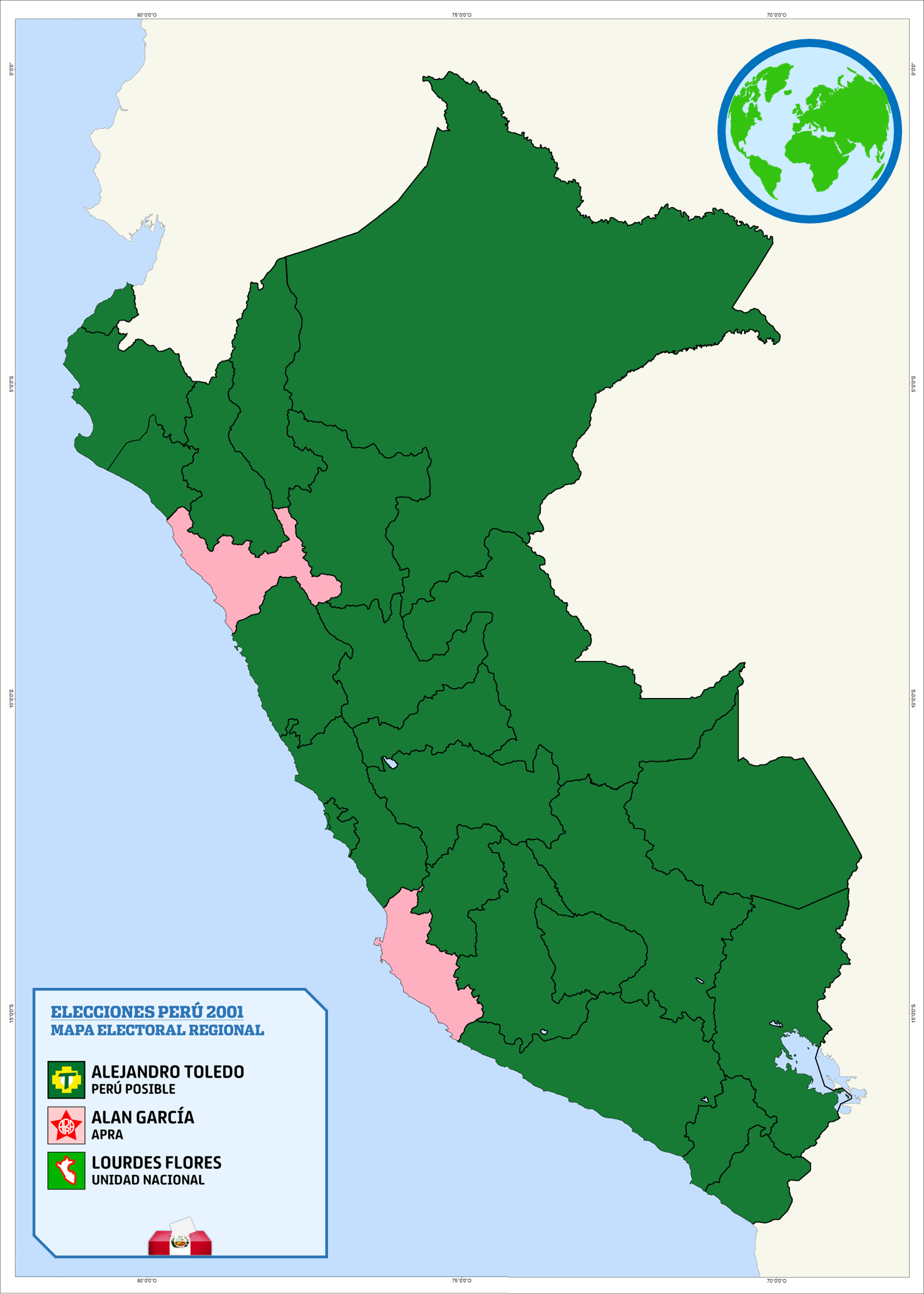
Leading candidate by region in the first round.

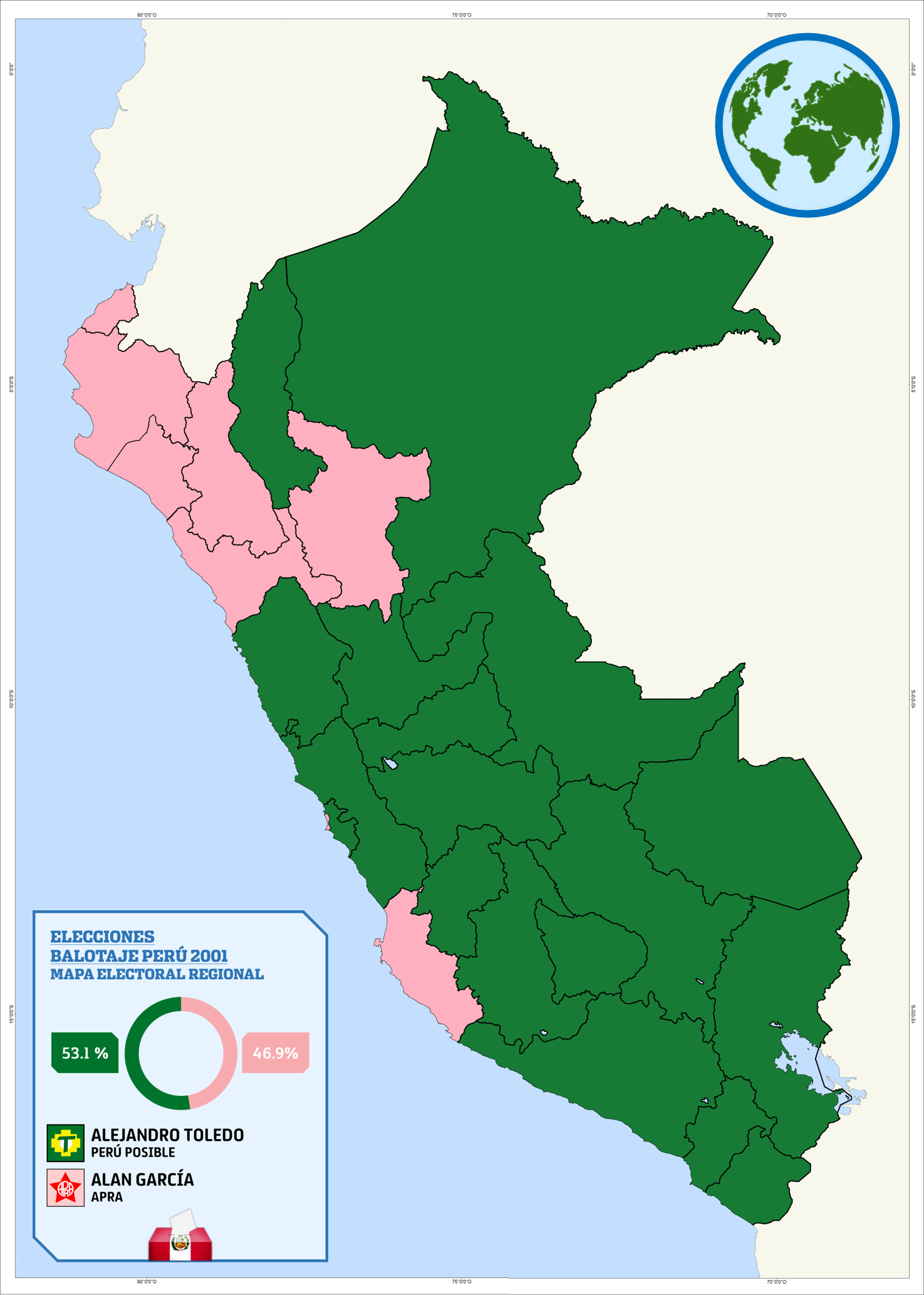
Leading candidate by region in the second round.

=== President ===
Candidate	Party	First round		Second round	
Candidate	Party	Votes	%	Votes	%
Alejandro Toledo	Possible Peru	3,871,167	36.51	5,548,556	53.08
Alan García	American Popular Revolutionary Alliance	2,732,857	25.78	4,904,929	46.92
Lourdes Flores	National Unity	2,576,653	24.30		
Fernando Olivera	Independent Moralizing Front	1,044,207	9.85		
Carlos Boloña	People's Solution	179,243	1.69		
Ciro Gálvez	Andean Renaissance	85,436	0.81		
Marco Arrunategui	Project Country	79,077	0.75		
Ricardo Noriega	All for Victory	33,080	0.31		
Total		10,601,720	100.00	10,453,485	100.00
Valid votes		10,601,720	86.44	10,453,485	86.19
Invalid/blank votes		1,662,629	13.56	1,675,484	13.81
Total votes		12,264,349	100.00	12,128,969	100.00
Registered voters/turnout		14,898,435	82.32	14,898,435	81.41
Source: Nohlen

=== Congress ===
Party	Votes	%	Seats	+/–
Possible Peru	2,477,624	26.30	45	+16
American Popular Revolutionary Alliance	1,857,416	19.71	28	+22
National Unity	1,304,037	13.84	17	New
Independent Moralizing Front	1,034,672	10.98	11	+2
We Are Peru	544,193	5.78	4	–5
Cambio 90 – New Majority	452,696	4.80	3	–49
Popular Action	393,433	4.18	3	0
Union for Peru	390,236	4.14	6	+3
People's Solution	336,680	3.57	1	New
All for Victory	191,179	2.03	1	New
Agricultural People's Front of Peru	156,264	1.66	0	–2
Project Country	155,572	1.65	0	New
Andean Renaissance	127,707	1.36	1	New
Total	9,421,709	100.00	120	0
Valid votes	9,421,709	78.60		
Invalid/blank votes	2,565,932	21.40		
Total votes	11,987,641	100.00		
Registered voters/turnout	14,898,435	80.46		
Source: Nohlen
