= Ricardo Belmont =

Peruvian TV network owner and politician

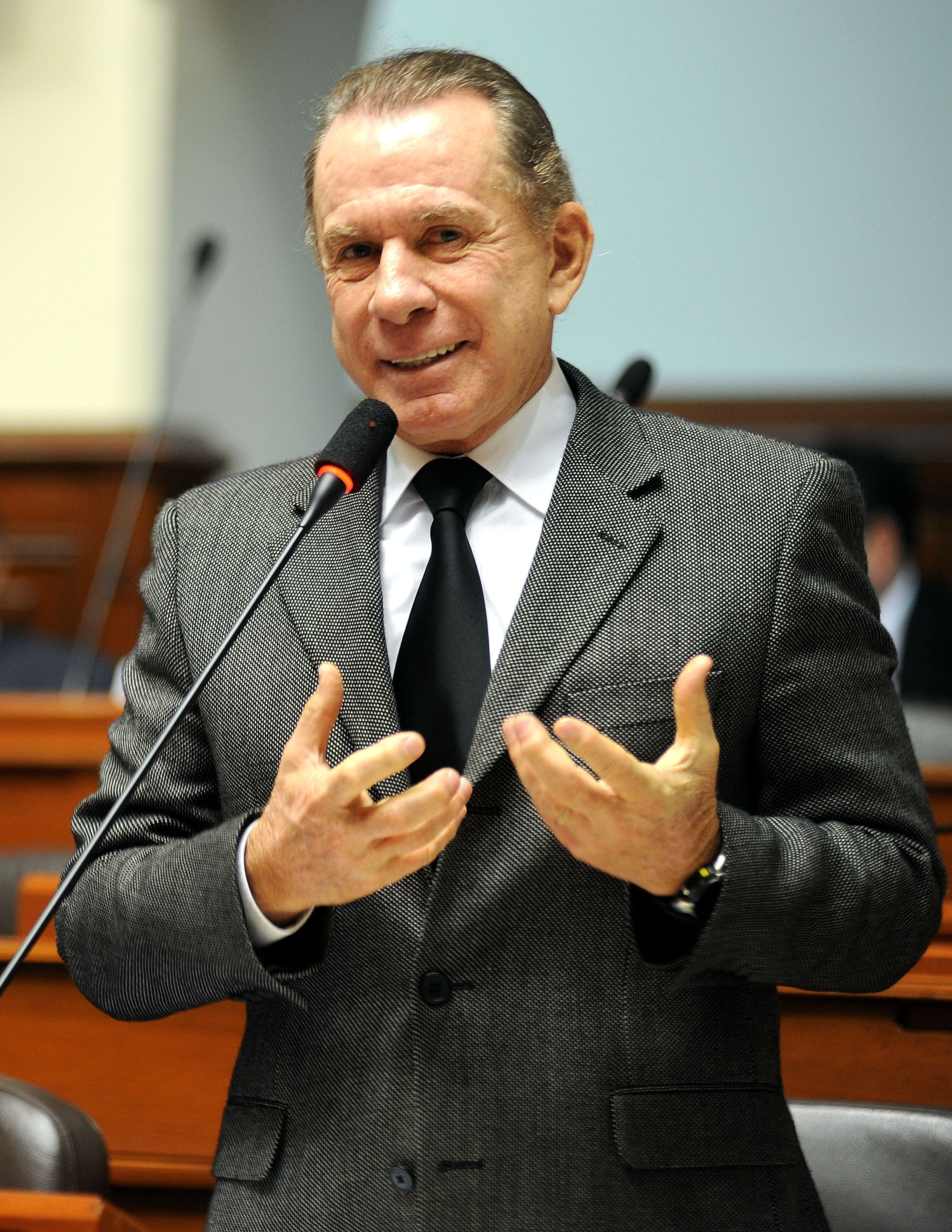
- Belmont in 2010

Member of the Congress
- In office 27 August 2009 – 26 July 2011
- Preceded by: Alberto Andrade
- Constituency: Lima

Mayor of Lima
- In office 1 January 1990 – 31 December 1995
- Preceded by: Jorge Del Castillo
- Succeeded by: Alberto Andrade

Personal details
- Born: Ricardo Pablo Belmont Cassinelli; 29 August 1945 (age 81) Lima, Peru
- Party: Civic Party OBRAS (since 1989)
- Spouse: María Mercedes Bazalar Pérez de Belmont
- Children: 5
- Education: University of Lima

Ricardo Pablo Belmont Cassinelli (born 29 August 1945) is a Peruvian TV network owner and politician. He was the Mayor of Lima serving from 1990 to 1995 and as a Congressman for the Center Front, representing Lima between 2009 and 2011, replacing Alberto Andrade, who died in office. He was popularly known as "El Hermanón" (Big Brother) for his friendliness and also as "El Colora'o" (Ginger) because of his reddish hair.

== Early life and education ==
Ricardo Pablo Belmont Cassinelli was born on 29 August 1945 in Lima to businessman Augusto Belmont Bar and Cristina Cassinelli Inurritegui. His paternal grandfather, Alejandro Belmont Marquesado, was a successful pharmaceutical industrial and founder of the Abeefe Laboratory.

He attended the Immaculate Heart school and Holy Mary Marianists school and earned a Bachelor of Business Administration for the University of Lima in 1967. During his youth he played the timpani in Combo 20, a rumba orchestra he formed with a group of friends. He later attempted to become a boxer, studying in the gymnasium of international star Mauro Mina.

== Career ==
Ricardo Belmont is the son of Augusto Belmont Bar, who founded TV Bego Excelsior (Channel 11 in Peru) in 1967. TV Bego Excelsior also owned Excelsior FM radio (104.7 FM in Peru). The younger Belmont was an avid sportsman who enjoyed football and boxing, and was a patron of players in both sports. His sports passion would later influence him in his political speeches, using sporting terms such as "let's all kick into the same goal post", and, during his reelection bid, "Second half time is about to start, and it's works vs. words. Choose the tree (his electoral symbol) and we'll win the game." In his "serious" life, he dedicated himself to journalism, befriending several local and national politicians all the while aspiring to be his own man in the media business. In his spare time he also dedicated his life to worthy causes, the most prominent being the local Telethon (based on the American version by Jerry Lewis), dedicated to helping the disabled kids at the San Juan de Dios Clinic in Lima.

In 1986 he took over Channel 11 and renamed it Red Bicolor de Comunicaciones (Bicolor Communications Network; the initials RBC allude to his personal name). Initially airing only from noon to midnight, Belmont mostly purchased American programming such as Bonanza, Get Smart, Bravestarr, and The Twilight Zone (the 1985 version). The few RBC-produced shows included "Desafio Familiar", which was a Peruvian version of Family Feud, "Habla el Pueblo", a Larry King-inspired talk show with Belmont himself as host, and "Mirando la Música", a music video program. In the late 1980s RBC started diversifying to break out of the niche market to compete with the Peruvian Big Two, America Television and Panamericana Television. RBC Radio 980 AM was mostly sports talk, while 91.9 FM was adult contemporary, in addition to Excelsior, which was mostly tropical and salsa. He is of English and Italian descent.

== Political career ==
=== Mayor of Lima ===
In late-1989, he announced his candidacy for the Lima provincial mayoralty as an independent. His political party, OBRAS (Works) alluded to the need for public works in Lima and the overall lack of progress as mayor by Jorge del Castillo, who was seen more as a lackey of Peruvian President Alan García than as an effective mayor. Although he supported Mario Vargas Llosa's Presidential candidacy, he chose to oppose Vargas Llosa's party's chosen mayoral candidate, Juan Inchaustegui. Belmont's charisma developed as a TV host and his lack of political affiliation helped him earn the people's vote, and he began to start his public-works program, which included several road and community improvement projects detailed below.

Initially Belmont and the new Peruvian President, Alberto Fujimori, were seen as comrades in arms because of their common political backgrounds as independents. The fiercely independent Belmont, however, drawing on his business skills, was able to get funds from several private enterprises to fund his programs.

Among the many public works projects he completed include:

- Intercambio Vial Norte (Northern Interchange): was a paving of Avenida Universitaria linking Carabayllo and San Miguel districts, with an interchange with Panamericana Norte along the way.
- Intercambio Vial Este (Eastern Interchange): was a combination of two new bridges spanning the Rimac River linking El Agustino directly with San Juan de Lurigancho
- Intercambio Vial Sur (Southern Interchange): was an actual interchange between Panamericana Sur, Av. Circunvalacion and Av. Javier Prado that eliminated traffic light crossings.
- Several losa deportivas (sports grounds) for poor communities, mostly concrete fields for mini-soccer, basketball, and squash.

Re-elected to a second term in 1993, Belmont and Fujimori had a falling out, due to resentment from Fujimori at Belmont's former support of Vargas Llosa. Fujimori, through his party-controlled Congress, issued Legislative Decree No. 776, by which provincial mayors were forced to distribute their government income down to the districtal halls under them (particularly from rich to poor distrital municipalities in the interior of the country). This stopped Belmont from pursuing further public works and improvements, and the municipal employees (most of whom were APRA party members left over from the Castillo administration) began turning against him through demonstrations, increasing his unpopularity. He ran for president in the 1995 general elections losing to incumbent President Fujimori and subsequently continued as Mayor of Lima declining to run for re-election in the 1995 Lima local elections and being replaced by Alberto Andrade. For the general elections of 2001, he was invited by the Independent Moralizing Front to run for the first vice-presidency on the presidential roster of Fernando Olivera, however, said presidential candidacy did not win in the elections and came in fourth place.

=== 2006 general elections and Congressman ===
In the 2006 elections, he ran for Congress in the Lima constituency, as an invited candidate under the Centre Front coalition but he was not elected, but he was summoned to Congress in August 2009 as a replacement for Alberto Andrade (his successor as Mayor of Lima), who died in office and completed the latter's 2006–2011 term.

=== Later political career ===
In November 2015, he agreed to be summoned to run for president of the Republic of Peru in the 2016 elections, by the Siempre Unidos party. However, in January 2016 he announced his resignation from the presidential candidacy because he did not accept pressure on behalf of the party's founder, Felipe Castillo, so that Isaac Humala, the father of then-President Ollanta Humala would be part of the presidential shortlist.

In 2018 he was a candidate for mayor of Lima for the Peru Libertario party. Since 2019 he has become a YouTuber and on his channel he publishes videos analyzing topics such as local politics, geopolitics, progressivism and the popular president of Mexico Andrés Manuel López Obrador.

Belmont is currently a presidential nominee in Peru's 2026 general election under OBRAS in his second stint for the Peruvian presidency.

== Electoral history ==
Year	Office	Constituency	List	Votes	%	Result
1989	Mayor of Lima	—N/a	L.I. OBRAS	999,237	45.15	Elected
1993	Mayor of Lima	—N/a	L.I. OBRAS	977,288	44.93	Elected
1995	President	—N/a	OBRAS	192,261	2.58	Lost
2001	First Vice President	—N/a	FIM	1,044,207	9.85	Lost
2006	Member of Congress	Lima	Centre Front	29,157	7.90	Lost (Note: Became a member in August 2009 after the death of Alberto Andrade)
2018	Mayor of Lima	—N/a	Libertarian Peru	205,716	3.89	Lost
2021	Member of Congress	Lima	Union for Peru	29,157	1.80	Lost
2026	President	—N/a	OBRAS	1,698,903	10.15	Lost

== Notes ==
Political offices
Preceded by Jorge del Castillo Gálvez	Mayor of Lima; 1990–1995	Succeeded by Alberto Andrade Carmona
