= Front of Hope 2021 =

Front of Hope 2021 Frente de la Esperanza 2021
- Abbreviation: FE2021
- President: Fernando Olivera
- Founded: 29 September 2020
- Registered: 18 December 2020
- Preceded by: Hope Front
- Membership (2020): 17,933
- Ideology: Reformism; Direct democracy Decentralization; Anti-corruption
- Colors: Green
- Seats in the Congress: 0 / 130
- Governorships: 1 / 25
- Regional Councillors: 10 / 342
- Province Mayorships: 4 / 196
- District Mayorships: 35 / 1,874

Party flag

Website
- partidofrentedelaesperanza2021.pe

Front of Hope 2021 (Spanish: Frente de la Esperanza 2021) is a reformist Peruvian political party. Founded in 2020 by former congressman and government minister Fernando Olivera, the party is organized as the direct successor of the defunct Hope Front party, which lost its registration at the National Elections Jury as it failed to pass the electoral threshold in the 2016 general election.

== History ==
Upon the results of the 2016 general election on 10 April 2016, presidential nominee Fernando Olivera announced he would found a successor party to the Hope Front in order to run again for President of Peru at the 2021 general election.

On 29 September 2020, a day before the deadline for parties to fully register in the National Elections Jury in order to participate in the upcoming general election, Olivera filed registration for his new party, and announced his candidacy for the presidential nomination. He was ratified as the presidential nominee on 6 December 2020, with the unanimous vote of 41 regional delegates. However, on 24 December 2020, the party was declared that did not fulfill requirements for registration in order to participate in the elections and consequently, the presidential and congressional tickets are rejected.

== Ideology and positions ==
Front of Hope 2021's ideology stands on a strong anticorruption rhetoric propelled by its leader, Fernando Olivera. Among its positions, the party advocates for a total reform and restructuring of the Peruvian State, alleging corruption as the main "disease" that has perverted the history of Peru since the early days of the republic. The year 2021 is highlighted as part of the celebrations of Peru's bicentennial on 28 July 2021.

Its symbol has the same broom used as the official logo of the defunct Independent Moralizing Front, the first party founded by Olivera in 1990, and disbanded in 2006 following the loss of party registration, with the addition of a green case.

== Election results ==
=== Presidential ===
Election	Candidate	First round		Second round		Result
Election	Candidate	Votes	%	Votes	%	Result
2021	Fernando Olivera	Ticket rejected				
2026	Fernando Olivera	307,880	1.84			Lost ✗

=== Congressional ===
==== Chamber of Deputies ====
Election	Leader	Votes	%	Seats	+/–	Rank	Government
2026	Fernando Olivera	241,274	1.67	0 / 130	New	▲15th	Extra-parliamentary

==== Senate ====
Election	Leader	Votes	%	Seats	+/–	Rank	Government
2026	Fernando Olivera	244,112	1.65	0 / 60		▲13th	Extra-parliamentary

== See also ==
- Independent Moralizing Front
- Hope Front (Peru)
