= Urban Rural Trade Unionist Party of Peru =

Political party

Urban Rural Trade Unionist Party of Peru (in Spanish: Partido Sindicalista Rural Urbano del Perú) was a political party in Peru. It was founded in 1939 by Jorge Badani.
