= Javier Luis Calmell del Solar =

Peruvian politician

Javier Luis Calmell del Solar (1882–1957) was a Peruvian politician. Elected to the Constitutional Congress of 1931 representing the fascist party Revolutionary Union, he also served in the Peruvian Senate from 1950 to 1956. He founded the Regionalist National Party of the Centre (Spanish: Partido Nacional Regionalista del Centro).
