= Labour Party of Peru =

Labour Party of Peru (Spanish: Partido Laborista del Perú) was a political party in Peru. It was founded in 1925 José Manuel Rodríguez.
