= Project Country =

Political party in Peru

Project Country Proyecto Pais
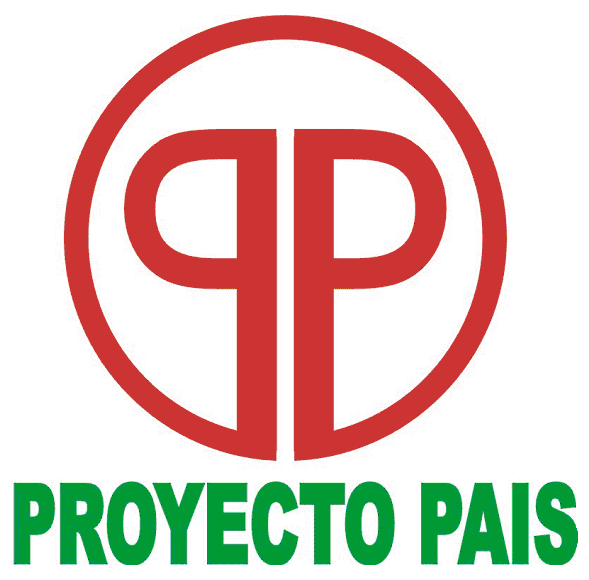
- Leader: Marco Antonio Arrunátegui Cevallos
- Founder: Marco Antonio Arrunátegui Cevallos
- Dissolved: 2007

Project Country (Spanish: Proyecto País) was a political party in Peru. At the 2001 Peruvian general election, the party won 1.6% of the popular vote and no seats in the Congress of the Republic. Its presidential candidate at the elections of the same day, Marco Antonio Arrunátegui Cevallos, won 0.7% of the vote.

At the legislative elections held on 9 April 2006, the party won less than 1% of the popular vote and no seats in Congress. That year was the last in which it partook in any elections, its license having been cancelled by 2007.
