= Muliza =

- Stylistic origins: Huayno, 18th century
- Cultural origins: Cerro de Pasco/Tarma (disputed)

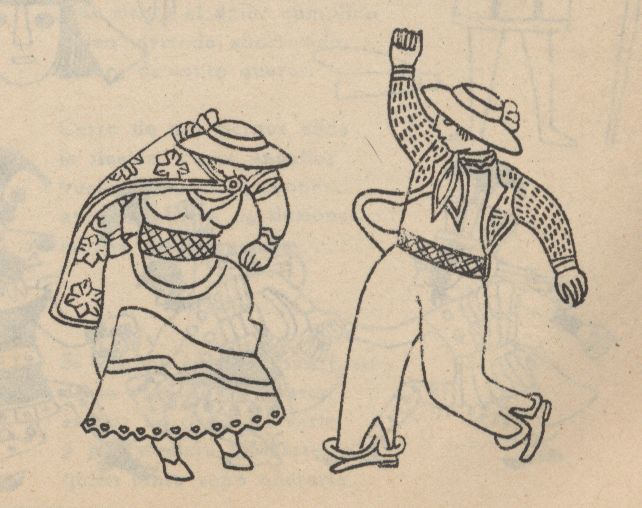
Representation of a couple dancing the muliza

Muliza is a traditional music and dance style from Cerro de Pasco, Pasco region, Peru. Other sources mention that it was originated in Tarma, Junín region, disputing both cities the origin of the dance. Popularized at the end of the 19th century, on February 3, 2014, it was declared a national cultural heritage.

== History ==
It was born in the 18th century during the Viceroyalty of Peru. The Spanish crown made use of the mines in Pasco, making mining one of the pillars of the colonial economy, determining economical, social and political change.

It seems that their origin can be found in the mining business and the transport of minerals from Cerro de Pasco to the Argentinian ports. This function was carried out by muleteers, who transported the minerals by mule. The name of the dance was derived from this line of work.

Says Rolando Casquero Alcántara:

[...] the muliza, the singing poem, has its origins in the north of the Republic of Argentina with the original name of "vidalita", from which far lands it arrived in Colonial Peru and then during the age of the Emancipation and the Republic, due to immigration and commercial interchange then and during more of the century and middle it has been diffused with more occurrence in the center of the country, especially in Cerro de Pasco.

Similarly, Dionicio Rodolfo Bernal affirms that

[...] the origin of the muliza can be found in the trade of Argentinian mule drivers, to sell metals from Cerro de Pasco [...] they brought with them their popular singers from the north of Argentina and they gathered them on the road.

Currently, muliza is linked to Carnival.
