= América Noticias (Perú) =

- Country: Peru
- Broadcast area: Peru
- Network: América Televisión
- Headquarters: Lima, Peru

Programming
- Language(s): Spanish
- Picture format: 1080i HDTV (downscaled to 16:9 480i for the SDTV feed)

History
- Launched: 21 October 1996; 28 years ago

Links
- Website: www.americanoticias.pe

América Noticias is a Peruvian open television network created in 1996 to replace the central news program Primera Plana.

== Background ==
It broadcasts all the national and international events, both news (which includes police on issues of indignation) and live links. It is responsible for producing and broadcasting five editions a week, and also manages its website and pages on social networks. At the same time, it is a complement to Canal N's information system.

Due to a report broadcast by the journalistic program "Tiempo Nuevo" hosted by Nicolás Lúcar on January 28, 2001, accusing former president Valentín Paniagua of having received money from a front man of Vladimiro Montesinos to finance his electoral campaign, the directors and hosts of América Noticias was outraged and decided to resign, which is why the news system was completely suspended the next day.

The central edition returned weeks later, completely renewed, under the direction of the Mexican journalist Félix Cortés Camarillo and the leadership of Álvaro Maguiña and Jessica Tapia. Shortly after, the morning newscast was broadcast again, this time under the name "América Hoy" hosted by Martín Del Pomar and Mabel Huertas.

In 2002, with the administration of the channel's board of creditors, changes were made to the service, the central edition was again presented by Pablo Cateriano and Claudia Doig and the morning edition was renamed Un Nuevo Día hosted by Sol Carreño (who returns to América Televisión after a year) and Carlos Cornejo (who came from Canal N).
