= Revolutionary Democratic Action =

Revolutionary Democratic Action (in Spanish: Acción Democrática Revolucionaria), was a political party in Peru, active in the 1950s. Its president was Carlos Guija.
