= Youth Independent Movement =

Political party in Peru

Youth Independent Movement Movimiento Independiente Juventud
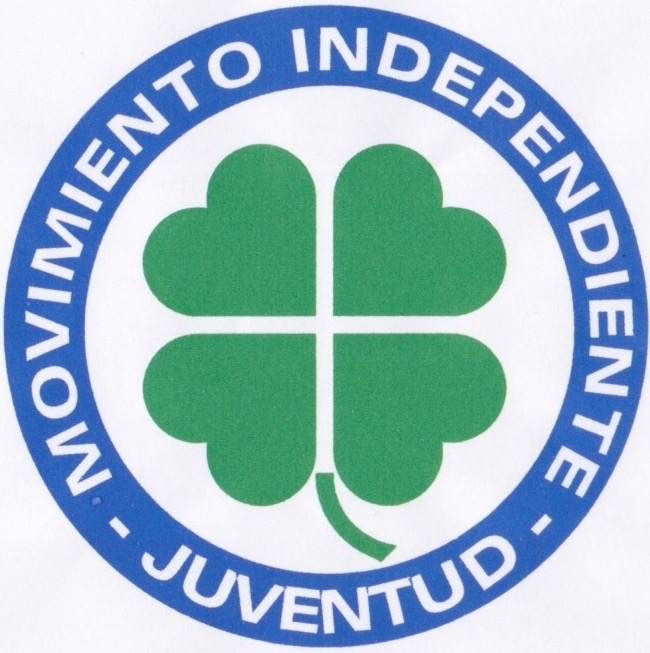
- Abbreviation: MIJ
- Leader: Víctor M. Marroquín
- Legal Representative: Jorge Fernández Roncagliolo
- Founded: November 2000
- Dissolved: March 2001
- Headquarters: Lima
- Ideology: Reformism; Economic liberalism Liberal conservatism
- Political position: Centre-right
- Colors: Blue Green

The Youth Independent Movement (Spanish: Movimiento Independiente Juventud) was a short-lived political party in Peru. Founded in November 2000, the organization was slated to participate in the 2001 general election, with founder and leader Víctor M. Marroquín as the presidential nominee.

The party eventually withdrew from the election in February 2001, as it was unable to gather the ballot registration required by the electoral law at the time. The National Jury of Elections stipulated in its 1997 Organic Law of Elections a determined number of adherents (approximately 500,000) to gain party registration for the election.

Not registered for the election on time, the party was officially dissolved in March 2001, and the election was ultimately won by economist Alejandro Toledo (PP), who defeated former President Alan García (APRA) in a run-off in June 2001. Into his administration, Toledo later on called Marroquín as part of his legal counsel team.
