= Peruvian Democratic Union =

Peruvian Democratic Union (Spanish: Unión Democrática Peruana) was a political party in Peru. It was founded in 1942 by Julio Marcial Rossi Corsi with the name Frente de la Peruanidad en Defensa de la democracia.
