= Hope Front (Peru) =

Hope Front Frente Esperanza
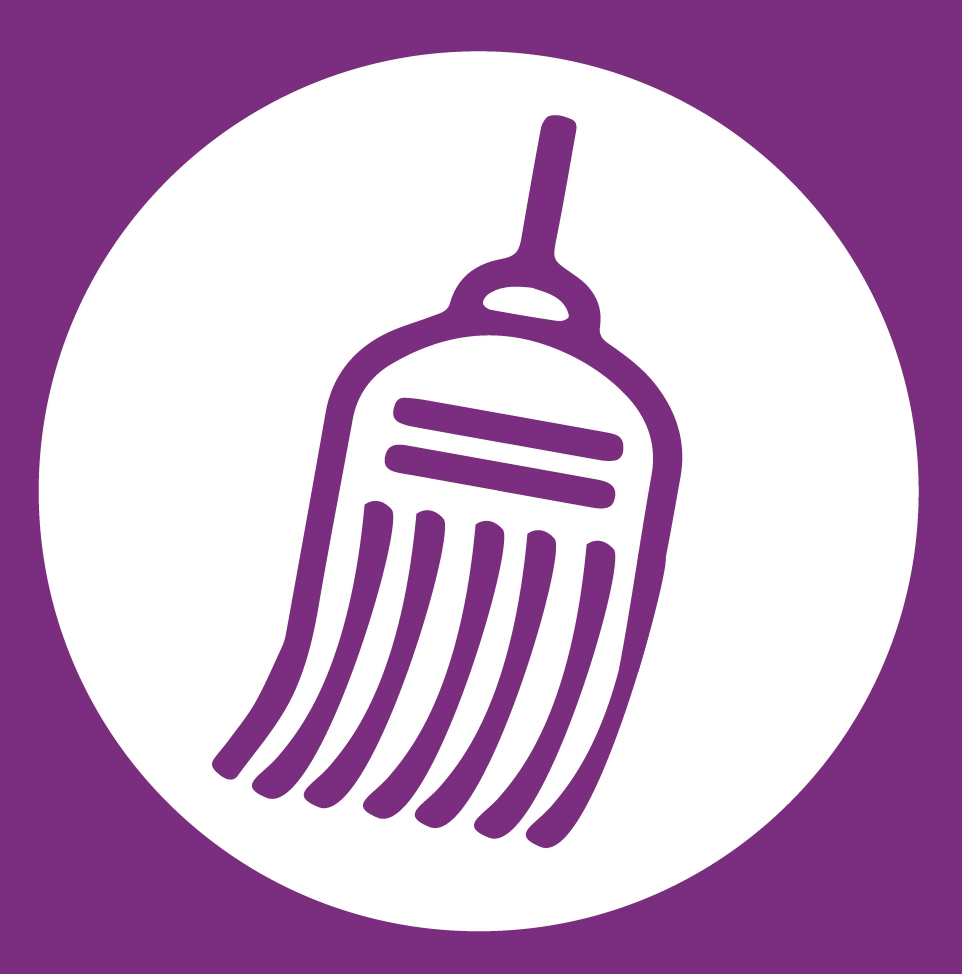
- Abbreviation: FE
- President: Fernando Olivera
- Secretary-General: Manuel J. Bustamante
- Founded: 24 December 2015
- Dissolved: 13 July 2017
- Preceded by: Independent Moralizing Front
- Succeeded by: Front of Hope 2021
- Ideology: Reformism
- Political position: Centre

The Hope Front (Spanish: Frente Esperanza) was a Peruvian political party. Founded in December 2015 by former congressman and government minister Fernando Olivera, he was nominated for the Presidency in the 2016 general election.

== History ==
At the general election held on 10 April 2016, the party's ticket won 1.3% of the popular vote, placing seventh. At congressional level, the party won 1.2% and no seats in the Congress of the Republic. Upon the results of the 2016 general election on 10 April 2016, presidential nominee Fernando Olivera announced he would found a successor party to the Hope Front in order to run again for President of Peru at the 2021 general election.

The party was subsequently cancelled by the National Elections Jury in July 2017 along other parties that failed to pass the electoral threshold.

=== Front of Hope 2021 ===
On October 30, 2020, the National Elections Jury approved the list of affiliates of Frente de la Esperanza 2021, Olivera's new party, to be able to be registered and participate in the general elections of Peru in 2021. The next day Olivera announced that he was going to run for the presidency of Peru.

== Election results ==
=== Presidential election ===
Year	Candidate	Party	Votes	Percentage	Outcome
2016	Fernando Olivera	Hope Front	203,103	1.32	7th

=== Elections to the Congress of the Republic ===
Year	Votes	%	Seats	▲/▼	Position
2016	139,634	1.2%	0 / 130	Steady	N/A

== See also ==
- Independent Moralizing Front
- Front of Hope 2021
