= National Civic Union (Peru) =

Defunct political party in Peru

National Civic Union (in Spanish: Unión Cívica Nacional) was a political party in Peru. The party was founded around 1939. Its general secretary was Luis Felipe Villarán Freire. The UCN, represented by Villarán Freire participated in the five-member commission set up by Manuel A. Odría ahead of the 1956 Peruvian general election.
