= Nationalist Party of Peru (Revilla) =

The Nationalist Party of Peru (in Spanish: Partido Nacionalista del Perú) was a political party in Peru. It was founded in 1933 by Clemente Revilla. Later Víctor M. Arévalo became the party leader.
