= Alberto Andrade =

Peruvian lawyer and politician

Member of Congress
- In office July 26, 2006 – June 19, 2009
- Succeeded by: Ricardo Belmont
- Constituency: Lima

Mayor of Lima
- In office January 1, 1996 – December 31, 2002
- Preceded by: Ricardo Belmont
- Succeeded by: Luis Castañeda Lossio

Mayor of Miraflores
- In office January 1, 1990 – December 31, 1995
- Preceded by: Luis Bedoya de Vivanco
- Succeeded by: Fernando Andrade Carmona

President of the We Are Peru
- In office 1997 – June 19, 2009
- Succeeded by: Fernando Andrade Carmona

Personal details
- Born: Alberto Manuel Andrade Carmona; 24 December 1943 Lima, Peru
- Died: 19 June 2009 (aged 65) Washington, D.C., United States
- Party: We Are Peru
- Relatives: Fernando Andrade Carmona (Brother)
- Education: National University of San Marcos

Alberto Manuel Andrade Carmona (December 24, 1943 – June 19, 2009) was a Peruvian lawyer and politician, born in Lima who served as the Mayor of Lima from 1996 to 2002 and as a Congressman from 2006 until his death.

== Education ==
He studied at the First National School of Peru of Our Lady of Guadalupe and at the Antonio Raimondi Italian School. He later studied law at the National University of San Marcos. He studied his postgraduate degree obtaining a master's degree in Administration from ESAN. He created the ALDA leather products company. He married Ana Teresa Botteri Herrera, had four children and four grandchildren until his death.

== Political career ==
Andrade started his political career as a member of the Christian People's Party in 1983, resigning to found his own political party, Somos Lima in 1994, to run as an independent for the 1995 Municipal elections. A former mayor of Miraflores, he made many public works for this district and his brother Fernando Andrade also served as the district's mayor from 1996 to 1998 and from 2003 to 2006.

=== Mayor of Lima ===
In the 1995 election, Andrade won the elections as mayor of Lima defeating Alberto Fujimori's ally, Jaime Yoshiyama and was sworn in on January 1, 1996. During his term as mayor, he was responsible for public works such as:

- The Javier Prado Highway (turning the portion of Javier Prado Avenue between Paseo de la Republica and Circunvalacion Expressways, originally a boulevard, into its own expressway)
- Modernizing parks and squares
- Improving the city's taxicab system
- The rebirth of the defunct Downtown Lima

In the 1998 municipal election, he was re-elected as mayor against Juan Carlos Hurtado Miller of the Vamos Vecino party, due to his high popularity, thanks to his first term high approval ratings.

==== 2000 Presidential elections ====
In 2000, he stood against President Alberto Fujimori in the presidential elections, but received, in large part due to a smear campaign, manipulated by the government, only 3.0% of the vote finishing in third place, and continued as mayor.

=== 2002 municipal elections ===
In the 2002 municipal elections, he ran for a third term, promising to modernize transport, importing Colombian public buses, known as Transmilenio, but he was defeated by National Solidarity leader Luis Castañeda Lossio of the National Unity Alliance, placing second with 29.9% of the vote.

=== 2006 elections and Congressman ===
He ran unsuccessfully for the First Vice Presidency in the 2006 Peruvian general election as the running mate of former President Valentín Paniagua in the Frente de Centro's ticket, but was elected for a seat in Congress.

== Death ==
He died in Washington, D.C., United States on June 19, 2009, at the age of 65 from pulmonary fibrosis.

Political offices
Preceded by Ricardo Belmont Cassinelli	Mayor of Lima; 1996–2002	Succeeded by Luis Castañeda Lossio
