= All for Victory =

Political party in Peru

All for Victory (Spanish: Todos por la Victoria) is a political party in Peru. At the legislative elections of 8 April 2001, the party won 2.0% of the popular vote and one out of 120 seats in the Congress of the Republic. Its presidential candidate at the elections of the same day, Ricardo Noriega Salaverry, won 0.3% of the vote. The party didn't take part in the 2006 elections.
