= Fernando Olivera (politician) =

Peruvian politician

Fernando Olivera Vega
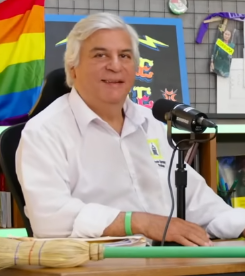

Minister of Foreign Relations
- In office 11 August 2005 – 13 August 2005
- President: Alejandro Toledo
- Prime Minister: Carlos Ferrero
- Preceded by: Manuel Rodríguez Cuadros
- Succeeded by: Óscar Maúrtua

Ambassador of Peru to Spain
- In office 27 November 2002 – 11 August 2005
- Preceded by: Carlos Pareja Ríos
- Succeeded by: José Lecaros de Cossío

Minister of Justice
- In office 28 July 2001 – 21 July 2002
- President: Alejandro Toledo
- Prime Minister: Roberto Dañino
- Preceded by: Diego García Sayán
- Succeeded by: Fausto Alvarado

Member of Congress
- In office 26 July 1995 – 26 July 2001
- Constituency: National

Member of the Democratic Constituent Congress
- In office 26 November 1992 – 26 July 1995
- Constituency: National

Member of the Chamber of Deputies
- In office 26 July 1985 – 5 April 1992
- Constituency: Lima

Personal details
- Born: Luis Fernando Olivera Vega; 26 July 1958 (age 68) Lima, Peru
- Party: Front of Hope 2021 (2020–present)
- Other political affiliations: Hope Front (2015–2016); Independent (2006–2015); Independent Moralizing Front (1990–2006); Christian People's Party (1985–1990)
- Spouse: Rocío Grases Miró-Quesada
- Children: Maria Fernanda Olivera Grases (daughter); Tamara Olivera Grases (daughter)
- Parents: Luis Olivera Balmaceda (father); Zoila Vega Zavala (mother)
- Education: University of the Pacific
- Occupation: Politician

Luis Fernando Olivera Vega (Spanish pronunciation: [ˌlwis feɾˌnãn̪.d̪o o.liˌβ̞e.ɾa ˈβ̞e.ɣ̞a]; born 26 July 1958) is a Peruvian politician and leader of Independent Moralizing Front (FIM), a Peruvian political party.

== Biography ==
Fernando Olivera (also known as Popy, after a popular 1980s clown) gained some support after the fall of the Fujimori government as an anti-corruption figure, having made secret tapes public showing Fujimori's advisor Vladimiro Montesinos attempting to bribe Congressmen Alberto Kouri, politicians and members of the press to join Fujimori's Peru 2000 party.

He and his party also have a history of confrontation with Alan García and APRA. FIM has also been ruling party Peru Possible's main ally during Alejandro Toledo's government. In September 2002, he was appointed Ambassador of Peru to Spain, a position he held until August 11, 2005. Recently, his party has been weakened due to a scandal that cost him his office as ambassador to Spain. The dismissal was allegedly due to inefficiency during his office. His designation as Minister of Foreign Affairs was very controversial, due to his lack of experience as a diplomat and his reputation for being conflictive, forcing him to resign.

He was registered as FIM's presidential candidate for the 2006 national election until 8 February 2006, when he dropped out of the race to lead the party's Congressional candidate list. His presidential campaign had been very unsuccessful, getting at most a couple percent of support nationwide, according to all public opinion polls since the official start of the electoral race in January.

In 2015, he presented his candidacy for the 2016 general elections of Peru, for the Hope Front party, with Carlos Cuaresma and Juana Avellaneda as his candidates for First and Second Vice Presidents. Once the elections were held, they reached 203,103 votes. Given that the electoral threshold is 5%, the party failed to cross the 5% threshold and lost its registration in the National Elections Jury.
