= Independent Moralizing Front =

Defunct Peruvian political party

Independent Moralizing Front Frente Independiente Moralizador
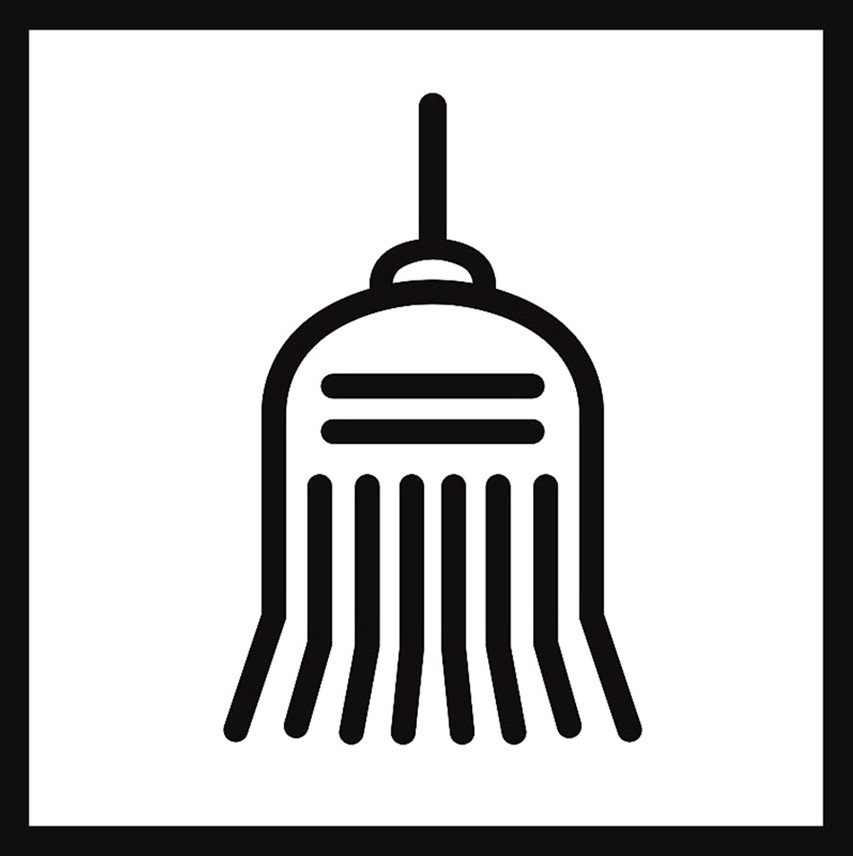
- Abbreviation: FIM
- Leader: Fernando Olivera
- Founded: 1990
- Dissolved: 2007
- Split from: Christian People's Party
- Succeeded by: Hope Front
- Ideology: Reformism
- Political position: Centre

FIM election poster, supporting a party candidate in the 1990 parliamentary election

The Independent Moralizing Front (Spanish: Frente Independiente Moralizador) was a Peruvian political party. At the legislative elections, 8 April 2001, the party won 11.0% of the popular vote and 11 out of 120 seats in the Congress of the Republic. Its presidential candidate at the elections of the same day, Luis Fernando Olivera Vega, won 9.9% of the vote. It was allied with former Peruvian president Alejandro Toledo's party, Peru Possible.

At the legislative elections held on 9 April 2006, the party won 1.5% of the popular vote but no seats in Congress. Some months after the awkward results in the 2006 elections, the party became disbanded and most of its last standing members pursued other goals.

== Elections ==
=== Presidential Elections ===
Date	Candidates	Result (% of valid votes)
2001 (first round)	President: Fernando Olivera; Vice President: Ricardo Belmont; Second Vice President: Eduardo Iriarte	9.85 % (Did not proceed to second round)
2006	President: Fernando Olivera	Candidacy was withdrawn

==== 2001 Presidential Elections ====
After the dismissal of Alberto Fujimori as president of the Republic of Peru and after Valentín Paniagua assumed the position of transitional President, he called general elections for April 8, 2001. In these new elections, the Moralizing Independent Front presented, for the first time, the candidacy of Fernando Olivera Vega for the presidency of the Republic of Peru. Accompanying him on the presidential ticket were Ricardo Belmont, as First Vice President, and Eduardo Iriarte, as Second Vice President. Soon, the candidacy of Fernando Olivera became of central importance, since, during the 15 years he was in parliament in opposition (1985–2000), the issue of public integrity and the fight against corruption characterized his public work, becoming an investigator of well known cases of corruption, during the governments of Garcia and Fujimori, which earned him sympathy with a large sector of the electorate.

The results arrived on April 8, 2001, and placed Olivera in fifth place, with 9.85% of the vote. Many strategic errors were identified with the campaign during the final stretch. For example, many claimed that he attempted to elevate himself above the rest of the contenders by directing all criticisms against Alejandro Toledo, the leader in the polls and eventual winner, thus detracting from his case against, and the resultant downfall of Fujimori.

The two candidates that proceeded to the second round were Alejandro Toledo, with the Possible Peru Party and Alan García, of APRA. During the campaign, the successive errors of Toledo and his family and campaign led him to lose popularity in a very short time. However, Toledo prevailed over his rivals with 53% of the valid votes, thanks, in part, to the support of Fernando Olivera.

==== 2006 Presidential Election ====
After terminating the alliance with Possible Peru at the end of 2005, the Independent Moralizing Front named Fernando Olivera as presidential candidate for the general election in 2006. However, due to the little support he registered in public opinion polls, he decided withdraw his candidacy for the presidency and run for Congress for the Moralizing Independent Front topping his party's list. After ending his candidacy, he states that "I am a man who believes in Peru and who believes in democracy, and because in a democracy, the people rule, I am announcing the withdrawal of my presidential candidacy and declare that, compliant with patriotic duty, I assume the responsibility of working for the rescue of Congress together with the entire FIM team and with all the Democrats of Peru.”

Before the first round, the congressmen from APRA, Jorge del Castillo, Mercedes Cabanillas and Mauricio Mulder delivered to the press a document referring to a "governing agreement" with four items that allegedly were signed by the National Unity candidate Lourdes Flores Nano and the questioned leader of FIM, Fernando Olivera. Immediately, the candidate of National Unity dismissed the existence of a governing agreement between the electoral alliance which he led and the Independent Moralizing Front.

The FIM's showing in the elections on April 9, 2006, were poor. None of the candidates on its list won their seats for the legislative period 2006–2011; further, due to not reaching the electoral threshold, the party lost its registration.

=== Deputy Elections ===
Date	% of Valid Votes	Seats	Chosen Deputies	Parliamentary Group
1990	15.63 %	7	Olivera Vega, Fernando (Lima); López Therese, Eduardo Felix J. (Lima); Falvy Valdivieso, Dennis Miguel (Lima); Picasso Salinas, Jaime Ernesto (Lima); Flores Aráoz Gratta, Fernando (Lima); Gamarra Olivares, Ernesto Ramón (Lima); Terán Iriarte, Edgar Victor (Lima)	Independent Moralizing Front

=== Democratic Constituent Congress Elections ===
Date	% of Valid Votes	Seats	Chosen Deputies	Parliamentary Group
1992	7.81%	7	Olivera Vega, Fernando; Gamarra Olivares, Ernesto R. Cuaresma Sánchez, Carlos; Larrabure Gálvez, César Ricardo; Chu Mériz, Julio; Sambucetti Pedraglio, Humberto; Serrato Puse, Willy	Independent Moralizing Front

=== Parliamentary Elections ===
Date	% Of Valid Votes	Seats	Chosen Deputies	Parliamentary Group
1995	4.89 %	6	Vega Olivera, Fernando; Merino Lucero, Martha Beatriz; Salazar Vargas, Jorge; Gamarra Olivares, Ernesto; Llerana Maroti, Antonio; Vidarte Correa, Elferez	Independent Moralizing Front
2000	7.56 %	9	Olivera Vega, Luis Fernando; Higuchi Miyagawa, Susana; Iberico Núñez, Luis Carlos Antonio; Pennano Allison, Guido Carlos; Ríos Salcedo, Waldo Enrique; Gamarra Olivares, Ernesto Ramón; Vásquez Valera, Manuel Alejandro; Donayre Pasquel, Patricia Elizabeth; Cuaresma Sánchez, Carlos Ricardo	Independent Moralizing Front
2001	11.0%	11	Infantas Fernández, Carlos Armando (Junín); Alcides Chamorro Balvín|Chamorro Balvin, Alcides Glorioso]] (Junín); Ibérico Núñez, Luis Carlos Antonio (Lima); Fausto Alvarado Dodero, Fausto Humberto (Lima); Susana Higuchi Miyagawa (Lima); Benítez Rivas, Heriberto Manuel (Lima); Requena Oliva, Juan Humberto (Piura); Pacheco Villar, Gustavo Adolfo (Puno)	Independent Moralizing Front
2006	1.5%	0		

=== Elecciones subnacionales ===
Date	District Level Results		Provincial Level Results		Regional Level Results	
Date	Elected Officials	Constituencies (convened / participating)	Elected Officials	Constituencies (convened / participating)	Elected Officials	Constituencies (convened / participating)
1993 (M)	60	1539/79	19	186/14		
2002 (RYM)	118	1635/200	20	194/22	11	25/2
2003 (MC)	0	13/3				
2005 (MC)	0	21/1				
2006 (NEM)	0	9/1				
2006 (RYM)	11	1637/63	0	195/11	0	25/1

- NEM: New Municipal Elections
- M: Municipal Elections
- MC: Complementary Municipal Elections
- RYM: Regional and Municipal Elections

== Developments ==
=== Fall of Fujimorismo ===
On the 14th of September, 2000, almost 2 months after Alberto Fujimori was sworn in for the third consecutive term as President of the Republic of Peru, the FIM congressmen Fernando Olivera, Luis Iberico and Susana Higuchi presented before public opinion a video where Vladimiro Montesinos appears to deliver 15,000 dollars to congressman Alberto Kouri in exchange for joining the government. At the time of the presentation of this video, the leader of the Independent Moralizing Front remarked that "today we are liberating Peru from the yoke of this Mafia," in reference to the government of Alberto Fujimori.

Two days after the publication of the video, Fujimori announced in a message to the Nation that he would dissolve the National Intelligence Service (SIN) and convese anticipated elections for April 2001. In those elections, in which the FIM participated with the presidential candidacy of Fernando Olivera and a parliamentary list, Luis Iberico publicized his candidacy with posters in which he was holding up the video as a symbol of the fight against corruption.

=== Government of Alejandro Toledo (2001-2006) ===
On the 28th of July, 2001, Alejandro Toledo assumed the presidency of the Republic of Peru, after defeating the APRA candidate Alan García in the second round of the 2001 Peruvian general elections. During the campaign, and continuing after the first round, the Independent Moralizing Front decided to support the candidacy of Alejandro Toledo to prevent the APRA candidate from winning in the second round. However, the support of the FIM to the Perú Posible candidate was achieve after both groups agreed to a so-called "Pact For Governance and Moralization" which established that any agreement with another political group must be approved by both parts of the alliance.

Already in government, Alejandro Toledo faced a Congress with a strong opposition parliament. Due to that, "he bet on an alliance with the Independent Moralizing Front (FIM), with whose votes —in addition to some independent ones—I could get a more manageable majority in Parliament." Subsequently, he established a minimum coalition between the party of government Peru Possible and the Independent Moralizing Front, a coalition which was constantly rocked by ministerial tensions, evincing breaks and demonstrating that there did not exist certainty in the votes that should have favored the government.

As a product of that alliance, the FIM leader and founder, Fernando Olivera was sworn in as Minister of Justice in the first Toledo cabinet and later was named Peruvian ambassador to Spain. The parliamentarian Fausto Alvarado Dodero, also representing the FIM, replaced Olivera as Minister of Justice and was sworn in "for the alliance of governance and moralization which seeks to give Peru a government that delivers to it prosperity." The ministerial change was greeted by the APRA parliamentarian Jorge del Castillo, who thought it "very well that the government has been liberated from the presence of Fernando Olivera, who, on account of his personality until the last moment created problems by his compulsive and confrontational attitude."

Other FIM figures with important positions during the Toledo government were Luis Iberico, who was chosen as fifth Vice President of the Republican Congress; Beatrix Merino, who was parliamentarian for the FIM in the period between 1995-2000 and then, as an independent, was chosen as the President of the Council of Ministers in the Toledo government in June 2003, and Eduardo Iriarte, who ran for the Second Vice President on the ticket with Fernando Olivera during his presidential run in 2001 and who would later serve as Minister of Production, Minister of Transportation and Communications and Director of the National Reserve Bank during the Toledo administration.

In February 2004, Fernando Olivera "announced that his political group would not participate in the discussion of the new cabinet the government was starting to overcome the existing governing crisis in the country, but that the alliance with Peru Possible remains firm." The wear and tear that Peru Possible, the party of President Alejando Toledo, suffered was similar to that suffered by the FIM. Some of its representatives were questioned "among them Olivera himself, who despite being ambassador to Spain spends more time in Lima, dedicated to political work; or the regional president of Cusco, who has just enacted a regional ordinance recognizing the free cultivation of the coca leaf in some valleys of that region," and as a result they began to lose popular support and soon they disappeared from public opinion polls, which hindered their electoral possibilities for 2006. At the end of the Alejandro Toledo government, the alliance with the FIM came to its end.
