= 2022 Lima municipal election =

Peruvian election

- 2 October 2022
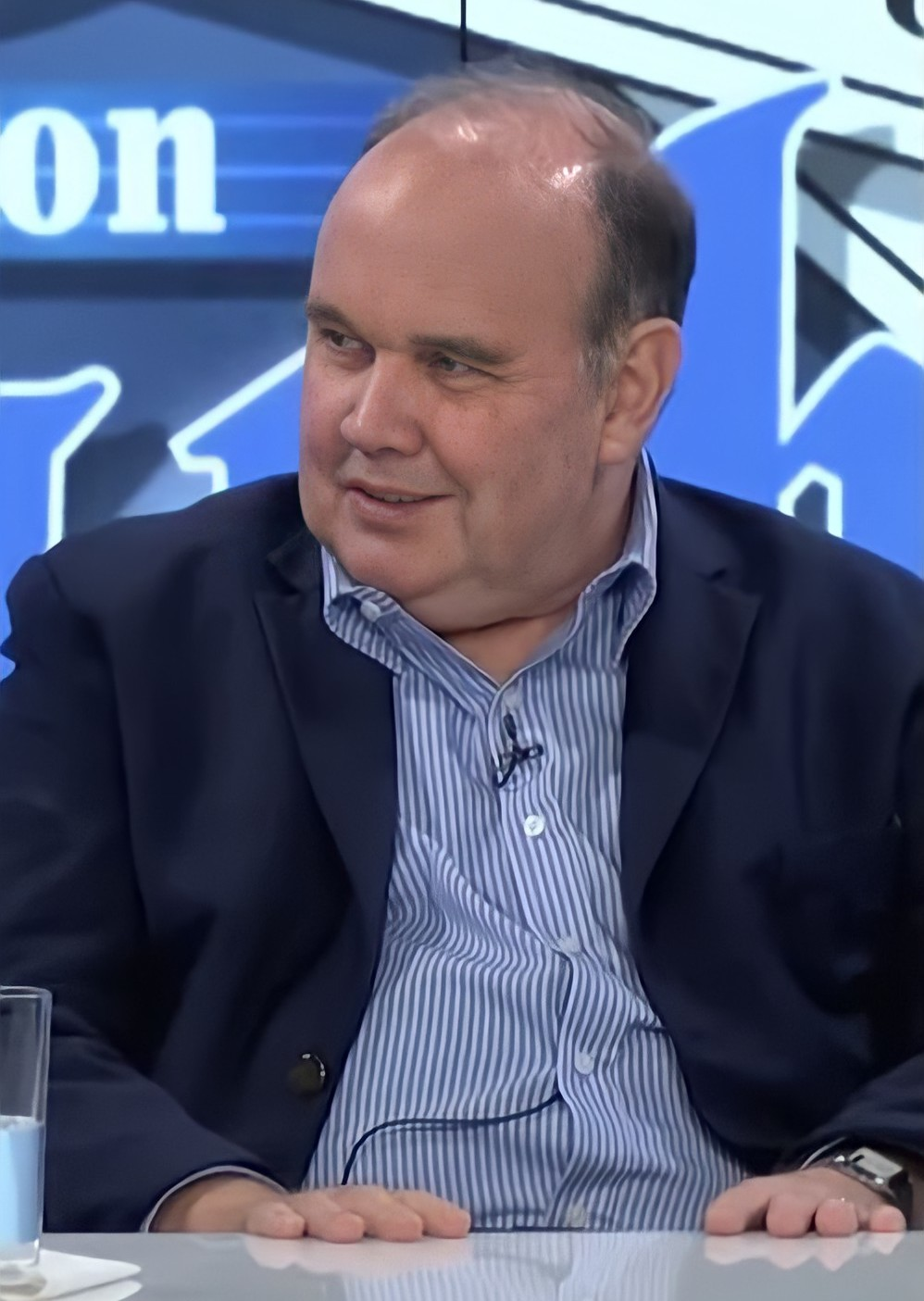

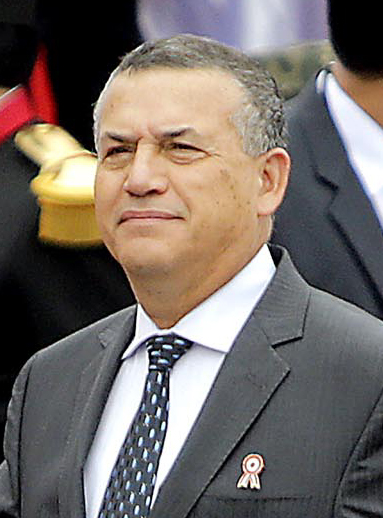

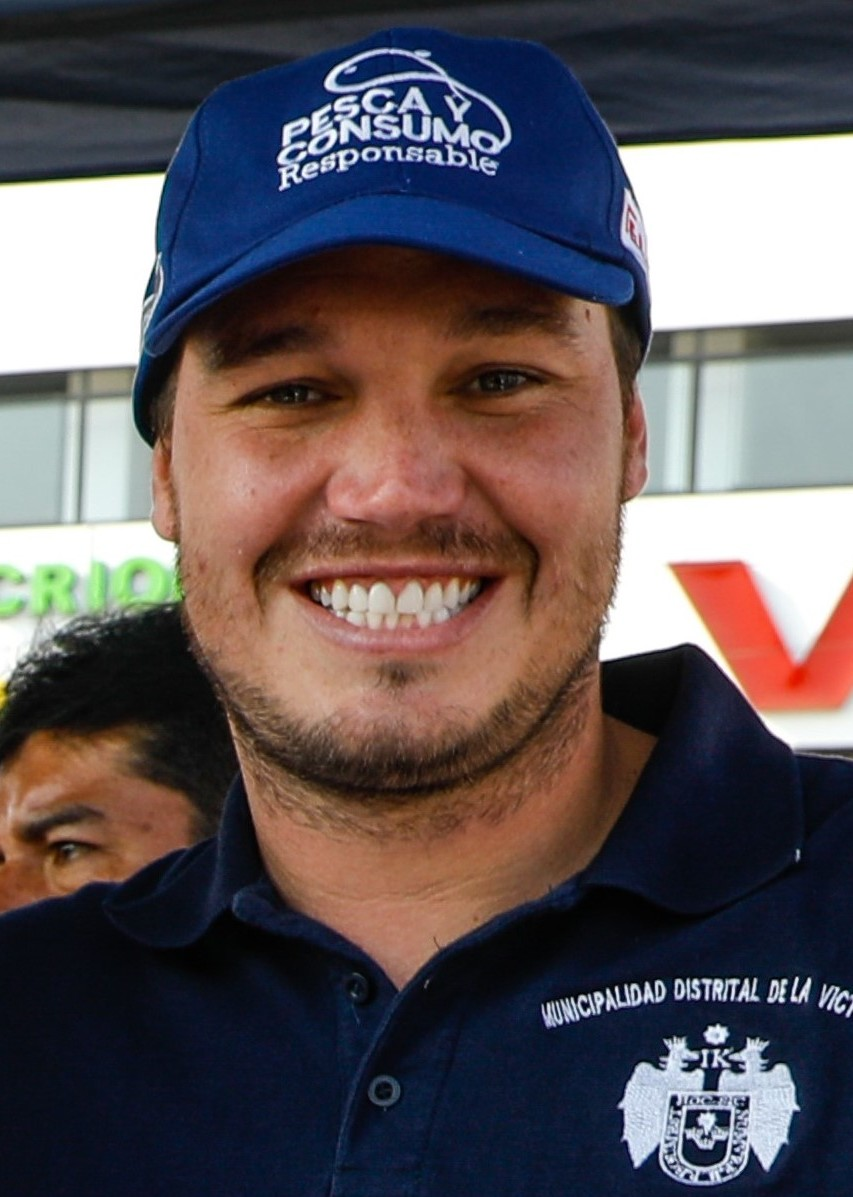
Candidate	Rafael López Aliaga	Daniel Urresti	George Forsyth
Party	RP	Podemos Perú	We Are Peru
Popular vote	1,402,627	1,349,725	1,007,979
Percentage	26.34%	25.35%	18.93%
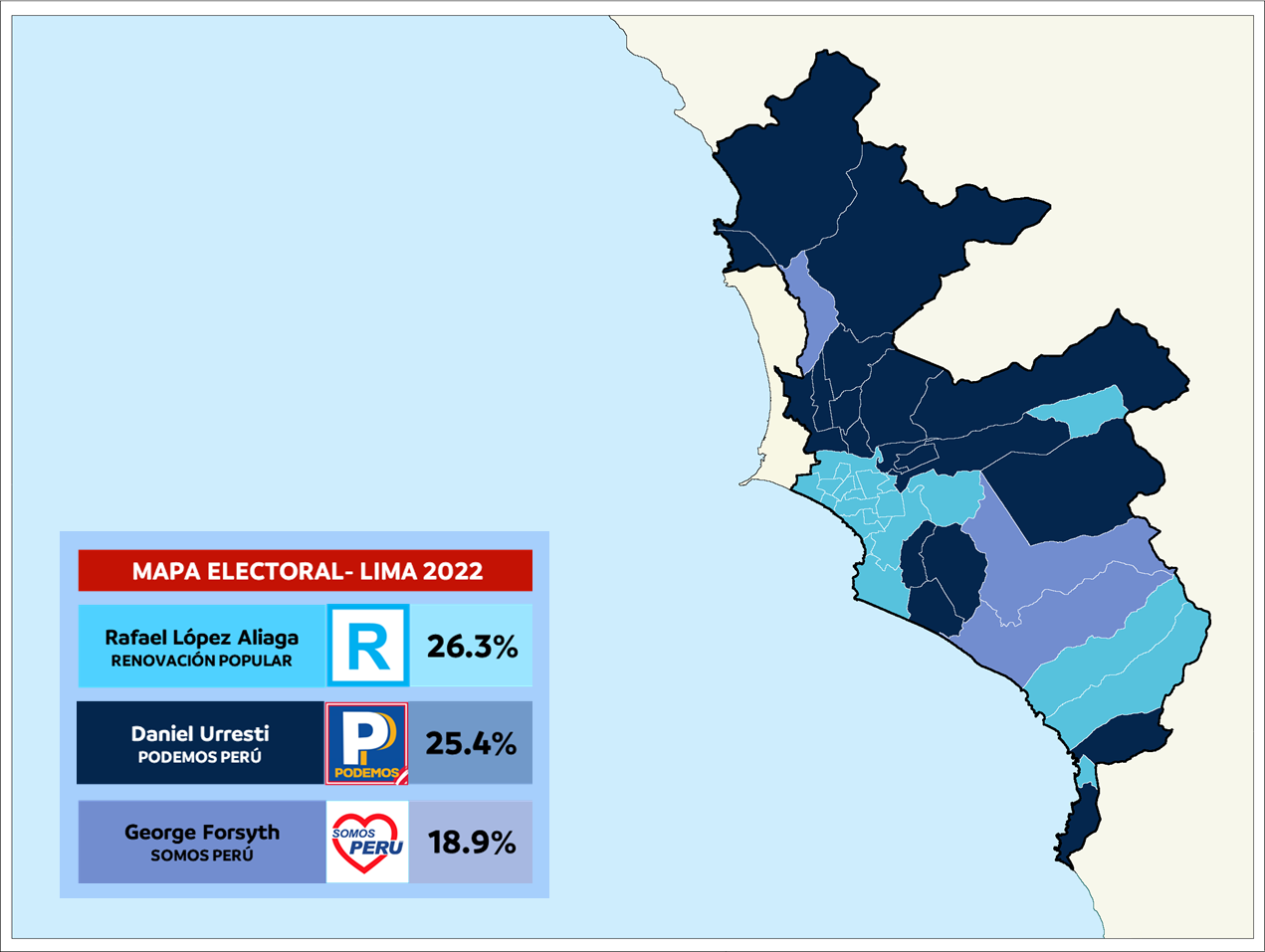
Mayor before election
Miguel Romero Sotelo
Popular Action
Elected Mayor
Rafael López Aliaga
Popular Renewal

The 2022 Lima municipal election were held on 2 October 2022, following the convening of regional and municipal elections throughout Peru. Lima residents voted on a list of 40 candidates to replace incumbent Miguel Romero Sotelo whose term ended on 31 December 2022, alongside 39 metropolitan councilpeople. Rafael López Aliaga, leader of Popular Renewal, would be elected mayor of the Lima municipality.

== Electoral system ==
The Metropolitan Municipality of Lima is the administrative and government body of the province of Lima. It is composed of the Metropolitan Mayor, the Provincial Council and the Metropolitan Assembly. The province of Lima is not circumscribed to any regional government in its condition of capital of Peru.

The election of the mayor and the council is carried out based on universal suffrage, which includes all national citizens over eighteen years of age, registered and resident in Lima and in full enjoyment of their political rights, as well as non-citizens nationals residing and registered in the province. There is no immediate reelection of the office of mayor.

The Provincial Council of Lima is made up of 39 councillors elected by direct suffrage for a period of four (4) years, jointly with the election of the Metropolitan Mayor. Voting is by closed list. The winning list is guaranteed a majority of seats, while the rest are distributed according to the d'Hondt method.

== Lists ==
Party	Logo	Mayoral nominee	Lieutenant nominee
Alliance for Progress; Leader: César Acuña		Omar Chehade	Katherine Ampuero
Free Peru; Leader: Vladimir Cerrón		Yuri Castro	Margarita Santos
Front of Hope 2021; Leader: Fernando Olivera		Elizabeth León	Luzi Toro de Jiménez
Go on Country - Social Integration Party; Leader: Aldo Borrero		María Elena Soto	N/A
Popular Renewal; Leader: Rafael López Aliaga		Rafael López Aliaga	Renzo Reggiardo
Together for Peru; Leader: Roberto Sánchez: Peruvian Humanist Party (Partido Humanista Peruano); Peruvian Communist Party (Partido Comunista Peruano); Movement for Socialism (Movimiento al Socialismo); New Peru (Nuevo Perú)		Gonzalo Alegría	Justibel Romero
We Are Peru; Leader: Patricia Li		George Forsyth	Elvis Pómez
We Can Peru; Leader: José Luna		Daniel Urresti	José Luna Morales

=== Rejected lists ===
Party	List			Rejection	
Name	Logo	for Mayor	for Lieutenant Mayor	Date	Motive
Democratic Green Party; Partido Demócrata Verde		Alex Gonzales	Flor de María Hurtado	27 June 2022	Party did not finish registration process in order to fully participate in the elections nationwide.
Faith in Peru; Fé en el Perú		Álvaro Paz de la Barra	Juan Villena	27 June 2022	Party did not finish registration process in order to fully participate in the elections nationwide.
Purple Party; Partido Morado		Guillermo Flores	Cynthia Yamamoto	13 July 2022	National Jury of Elections bureaucratic proceedings against the entire list.
Go on Country - Social Integration Party; Avanza País - Partido de Integración Social		Luis Molina	Carlos Villacorta	29 July 2022	National Jury of Elections bureaucratic proceedings against the entire list but one candidate for the Metropolitan Council. (Note: Following Go on Country's almost entire list disqualification, Soto Velásquez, formally a candidate for councilwoman, remained as the only candidate to legally run for the party based on list succession.)
Patriotic Party of Peru; Partido Patriótico del Perú		Julio Lingán	Herbert Caller	1 August 2022	National Jury of Elections bureaucratic proceedings against the entire list was not appealed on time, sealing disqualification.

=== Declined to run ===
- Richard Acuña – Alliance for Progress
- Ricardo Belmont – Free Peru
- Sergio Tejada – Together for Peru
- César Combina – Popular Force
- Edde Cuéllar – Popular Action
- Jorge Quintana – Popular Action
- Javier Combe – Popular Action
- Luis Enrique Gálvez – Popular Action
- Zenaida Solís – Purple Party

== Opinion polls ==
=== Voting simulations ===
Pollster	Date	Sample size	Daniel Urresti	Rafael López Aliaga	George Forsyth	Omar Chehade	Gonzalo Alegría	María Elena Soto	Elizabeth León	Yuri Castro	Blank / None
Election results	2 October 2022	N/A	25.35	26.34	18.93	7.11	6.38	3.50	10.92	1.47	N/A
CPI/Panamericana (Valid votes)	24-25 Sep. 2022	4150	28.1	25.9	18.4	10.0	6.9	4.6	3.8	2.3	N/A
CPI/Panamericana (Cast votes)	24-25 Sep. 2022	4150	25.0	23.1	16.4	8.9	6.1	4.1	3.4	2.1	10.9
Ipsos Perú/América (Valid votes)	22-23 Sep. 2022	802	28.4	26.7	19.9	6.9	5.9	5.2	5.3	1.7	N/A
Ipsos Perú/América (Cast votes)	22-23 Sep. 2022	802	23.9	22.4	16.7	5.8	5.0	4.4	4.5	1.4	15.9
CIT/Expreso (Valid votes)	21-23 Sep. 2022	1200	34.0	31.1	14.4	5.7	6.7	3.5	3.4	1.3	N/A
CIT/Expreso (Cast votes)	21-23 Sep. 2022	1200	24.5	22.4	10.3	4.1	4.8	2.5	2.4	0.9	28.0
Datum/Perú21/Gestión (Valid votes)	19-21 Sep. 2022	400	27.9	26	14.3	8.1	8.1	6.5	4.9	4.2	N/A
Datum/Perú21/Gestión (Cast votes)	19-21 Sep. 2022	400	21.5	20.0	11.0	6.3	6.3	5.0	3.8	3.3	22.8

=== Electoral polls ===
Pollster	Date	Sample size	Daniel Urresti	Rafael López Aliaga	George Forsyth	Omar Chehade	Gonzalo Alegría	Yuri Castro	Elizabeth León	María Soto (L. Molina)	Julio Lingán	Guillermo Flores	Álvaro Paz de la Barra	Alex Gonzales	Other	Blank / None	Undecided
Election results	2 October 2022	N/A	25.35	26.34	18.93	7.11	6.38	1.47	10.92	3.50	N/A	N/A	N/A	N/A	N/A	N/A	N/A
IEP/La República	19-22 Sep. 2022	384	19.4	16.7	16.3	1.6	7.4	2.2	2.4	2.2	N/A	N/A	N/A	N/A	-	18.1	13.8
Datum/Perú21/Gestión	19-21 Sep. 2022	400	25.5	23.0	15.3	4.3	1.5	1.5	3.0	-	N/A	N/A	N/A	N/A	-	19	11
Ipsos Perú/América	8-9 Sep. 2022	501	27	25	15	4	3	2	3	-	N/A	N/A	N/A	N/A	-	9	12
Datum/Perú21/Gestión	3-7 Sep. 2022	403	27	25	11	2	3	1	1	-	N/A	N/A	N/A	N/A	-	19	11
IDICE/La Razón	16 Aug. 2022	500	20	17	9	11	1	2	1	-	N/A	N/A	N/A	N/A	-	-	39
Ipsos Perú/América	11-12 Aug. 2022	500	26	22	11	2	2	2	2	-	N/A	N/A	N/A	N/A	-	12	21
CIT/Expreso	6-8 Aug. 2022	1200	23.3	24.2	10.2	3.7	-	-	-	-	-	N/A	N/A	N/A	2.9	13.4	22.3
CPI/ATV	3-10 Aug. 2022	500	22.8	21.5	9.8	4.1	2.6	1.1	0.4	-	N/A	N/A	N/A	N/A	-	22.3	15.3
IEP/La República	1-4 Aug. 2022	377	25.4	22.0	13.3	2.7	1.1	2.0	0.5	1.6	0.5	2.6	N/A	N/A	2.6	16.7	8.8
Datum/Perú21/Gestión	1-3 Aug. 2022	401	23	17	8	1	1	1	1	2	1	1	N/A	3	-	24	17
Ipsos Perú/El Comercio	14-15 Jul. 2022	502	22	21	9	1	1	1	1	4	1	N/A	N/A	N/A	-	15	24
Datum/Perú21/Gestión	8-12 Jul. 2022	400	24	19	9	-	-	1	-	1	-	-	-	1	2	21	22
CPI/ATV	20-23 Jun. 2022	500	17.1	16.7	7.8	2.1	1.1	0.8	0.6	6.6	0.5	3.3	-	-	-	23.8	19.6
IEP/La República	20-23 Jun. 2022	500	22.3	18.7	11.0	0.5	2.4	0.9	0.4	1.3	-	3.4	-	-	1.3	22.7	15.2
Ipsos Perú/El Comercio	9-10 Jun. 2022	500	20	18	9	1	1	1	1	3	1	1	3	1	1	13	26
IEP/La República	23-26 May 2022	500	10	6	1.1	0.1	0.7	0.9	-	1.4	-	1.2	0.4	-	6.1	20.9	50.8
Ipsos Perú/El Comercio	12-13 May 2022	501	20	20	9	1	1	1	1	4	1	2	2	1	1	8	28
Datum/Perú21/Gestión	5-9 May 2022	405	21	22	9	3	-	-	-	2	-	-	5	-	3	23	12
CPI/RPP	25-29 Apr. 2022	500	20.9	17.1	11.2	0.8	1.6	0.9	0.7	4.3	-	1.6	5.7	-	7.9	16.4	11.9
IDICE/La Razón	18 Apr. 2022	500	24	23	15	5	-	1	1	8	-	1	1	1	2	-	18

=== Pre-electoral polls ===
Pollster	Date	Sample Size	Rafael López Aliaga	Daniel Urresti	George Forsyth	Richard Acuña	Luis Molina	Álvaro Paz de la Barra	César Combina	Zenaida Solís	Edde Cuéllar	Sergio Tejada	Omar Chehade	Yuri Castro	Álex Gonzáles	Others	Blank / None	Undecided
Ipsos Perú/América	7 Apr. 2022	1205	19	18	9	4	5	2	3	1	-	2	-	1	1	-	12	22
Datum/Perú 21/Gestión	2–4 Apr. 2022	335	19	21	10	-	1	3	1	-	2	-	-	-	-	-	22	10
CPI	21-25 Mar. 2022	500	18.6	16.6	10.1	3.5	2.0	4.5	1.3	2.4	4.0	-	-	-	0.7	11.9	14.6	9.8
CIT/Expreso	11–13 Mar. 2022	509	23.2	18.1	13.4	-	0.8	4.1	2.0	-	1.6	-	0.4	-	0.4	5.9	1.6	28.5
Ipsos Perú/El Comercio	8 Mar. 2022	463	19	20	11	4	4	1	2	2	-	2	-	1	1	2	9	22
CIT/Expreso	11–13 Feb. 2022	500	17.2	14.8	7.4	-	3.4	4.0	5.0	-	3.0	-	-	-	-	23.2	7.2	14.8
Ipsos Perú/América	10–11 Feb. 2022	466	17	17	10	5	4	3	3	2	-	2	-	2	1	2	12	20
CPI/Latina	3–11 Feb. 2022	3500	14.6	15.9	11.5	3.2	2.0	2.8	1.8	-	-	-	-	-	-	18.4	17.5	12.8
Ipsos Perú/El Comercio	13–14 Jan. 2022	460	19	13	10	4	4	-	3	-	-	-	-	-	-	18	9	20
Ipsos Perú/El Comercio	9–10 Dec. 2021	462	15	11	6	4	4	-	–	-	-	-	-	-	-	22	16	22

== Results ==
=== Metropolitan Municipality of Lima ===
Candidate	Party	Votes	%	Seats	+/–
Rafael López Aliaga	Popular Renewal	1,402,627	26.34	21	+20
Daniel Urresti	Podemos Perú	1,349,725	25.35	7	-1
George Forsyth	We Are Peru	1,007,979	18.93	5	+4
Elizabeth León	Front of Hope 2021	581,269	10.92	3	New
Omar Chehade	Alliance for Progress	378,642	7.11	2	+1
Gonzalo Alegría	Together for Peru	339,570	6.38	1	+1
María Elena Soto	Go on Country – Social Integration Party	186,529	3.50	0	0
Yuri Castro	Free Peru	78,364	1.47	0	0
Total		5,324,705	100.00	39	–
Valid votes		5,324,705	89.24		
Invalid votes		445,184	7.46		
Blank votes		196,726	3.30		
Total votes		5,966,615	100.00		
Registered voters/turnout			–		
