= Edgar Tello =

Peruvian politician

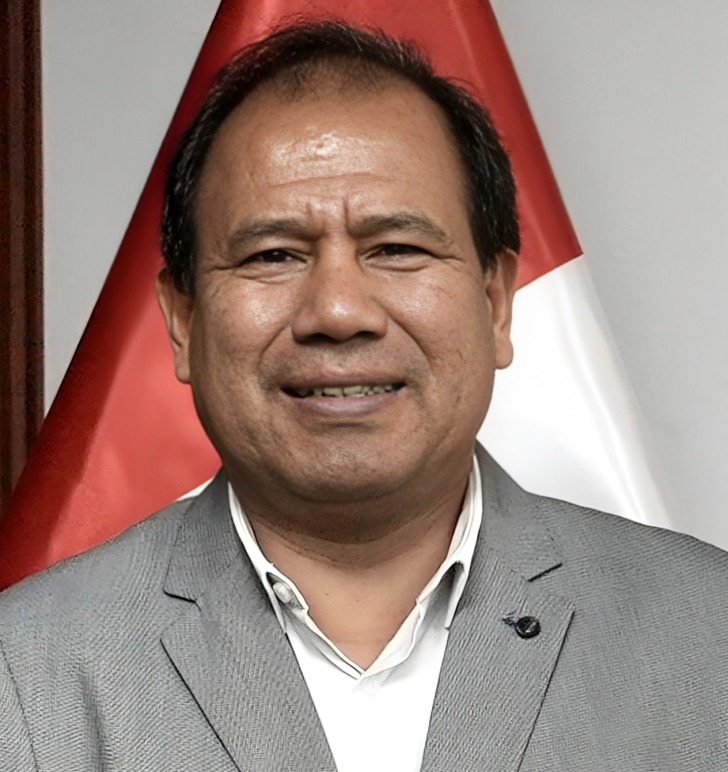

Member of Congress
- In office July 27, 2021 – July 26, 2026
- Constituency: Lima

Personal details
- Born: Nivardo Edgar Tello Montes; October 2, 1969 (age 56) Lima, Perú
- Party: Podemos Perú (2024-present)
- Other political affiliations: Free Peru (2020-2022)

Nivardo Edgar Tello Montes (born October 2, 1969) is a member of the Congress of the Republic of Peru.

== Political career ==
Edgar Tello assumed office in Peru's Congress on July 27, 2021.

=== Electoral history ===
Tello obtained 5,133 votes for office.
