= 2019 Pan American Games opening ceremony =

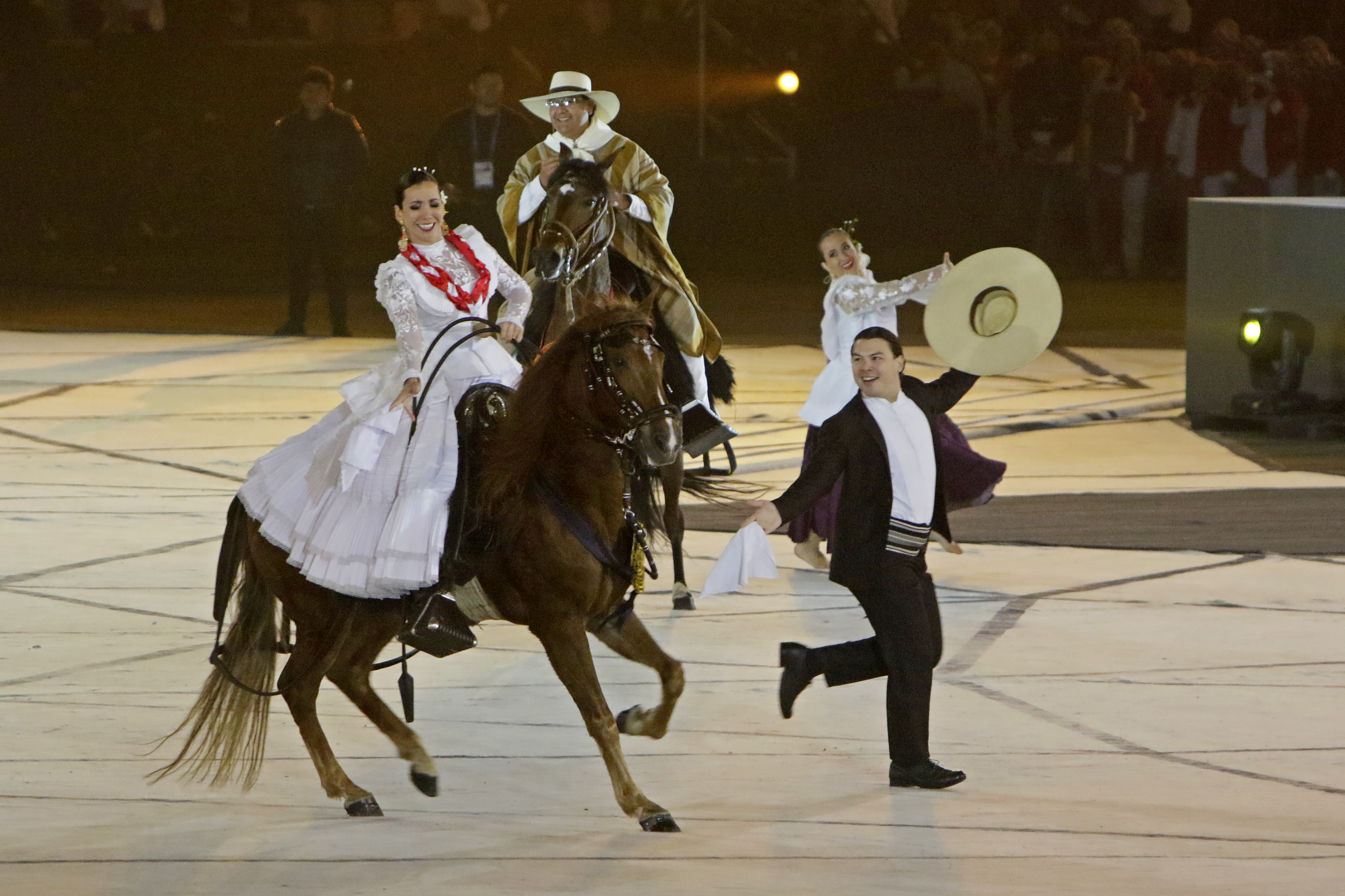
- Horseback performance during the "Amancaes" segment of the ceremony
- Date: July 26, 2019
- Time: 20:00 – 23:05 (PET)
- Venue: Estado Nacional del Perú
- Location: Lima, Peru
- Also known as: Amazing Peru!
- Footage: https://www.youtube.com/watch?v=HItyiLhVByw

The opening ceremony of the 2019 Pan American Games took place on Friday July 26, 2019, at the Estadio Nacional del Perú in Lima, Peru, and ran from 20:00 to 23:05 PET. The ceremony was entitled "Amazing Peru!" and featured a stage designed as Pariacaca, the sacred mountain of Lima. It was produced by Italian company Balich Worldwide Shows and directed by creative director Francisco Negrin.

== Proceedings ==
=== Countdown ===
The ceremony began with countdown numbers from 30 to zero. In the final 17 numbers, colors of the logos of the previous Pan American Games were projected onto the mountain stage. Volunteers then ran to the center of the stage, forming various sports pictograms and eventually the Games emblem.

=== The Nation ===
Afterwards, the President of Panam Sports Neven Ilic and the President of the Republic of Peru Martin Vizcarra were introduced to the crowd.

This was followed by a performance of "El Perú", a poem composed by Marco Martos, conveyed through all 49 languages of Peru. Performers on stage would then join in performing the National Anthem of Peru.

=== The Calling ===
Inspired by the Warachikuy, this segment began with a performer, depicting the god Pariacaca, summoning chasquis. They then called for 41 marathon runners, representing the 41 nations participating in the Games. These runners were challenged by 41 deities in order to prove their athletic worth.

=== Dawn ===
==== Pacific ====
The first half of Dawn is set in the Peruvian coast. With the marathon runners haven proved their worth, Pariacaca then called for the stars, with constellations projected onto the mountain. The Pacific Ocean was depicted with fish inspired by pre-Hispanic art. The fish were joined by fishermen on caballitos de totora, reed fishing boats, which are considered ancient predecessors to the modern-day surfboard.

The fishermen were then joined by modern surfers, as props resembling thorny oysters were revealed on the bottom of the mountain. The fishermen and surfers exited the stage together as the stage was illuminated by yellow and orange lighting, indicating the arrival of dawn.

==== Amancaes ====
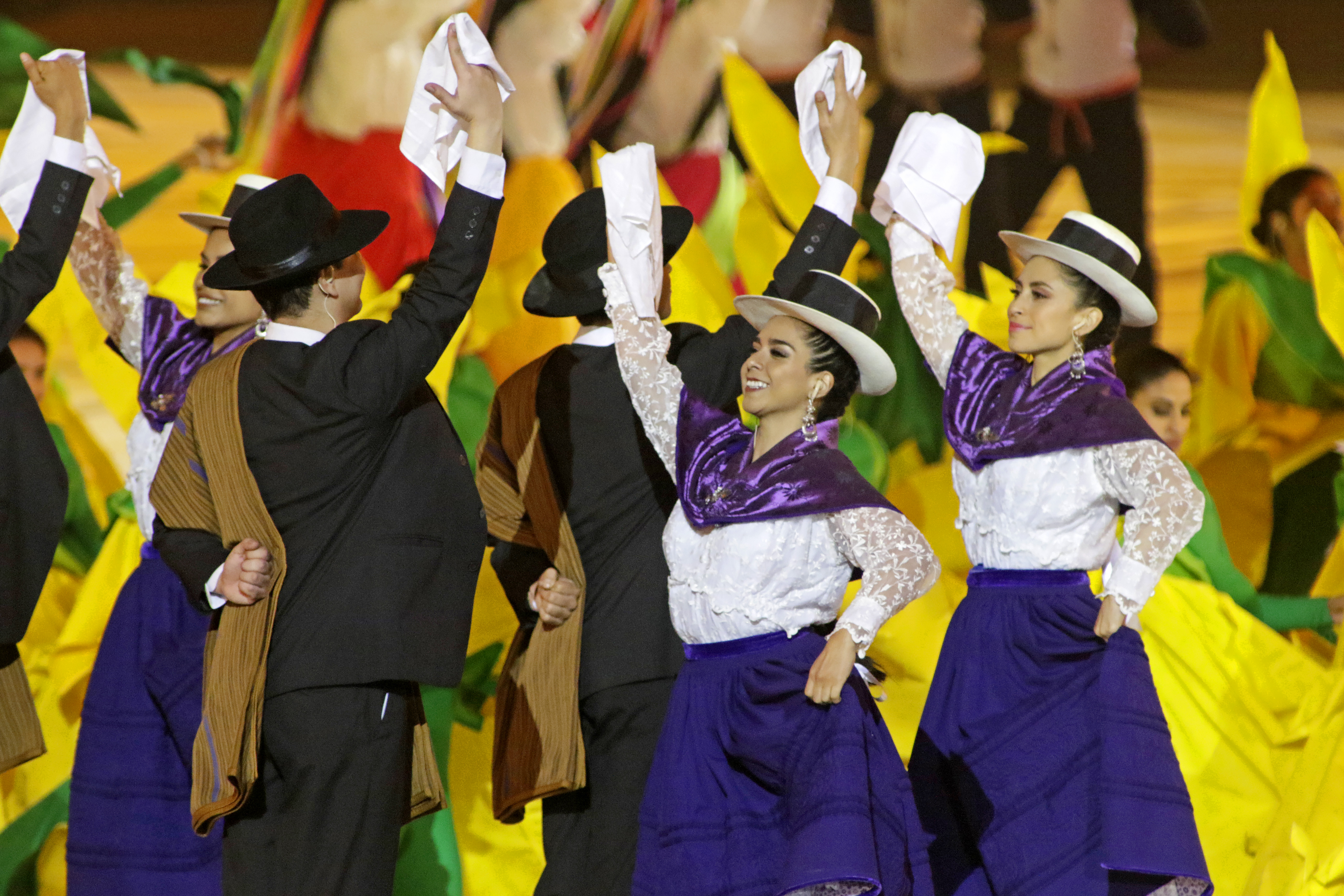
Dancers during the "Amancaes" segment

With the arrival of dawn, the thorny oysters transformed into amancaes flowers, the symbol of Lima. Performers dressed as amancaes flowers walked onto the stage, accompanied by harp and cajon players who perform from the mountain. The amancaes dancers were further joined by dancers on horseback and on foot, and ended the segment by coming together to form a map of Peru on the floor.

=== Sports ===
The stadium floor was then covered by cajones, an Afro-Peruvian percussion, playing music as the sports pictograms were depicted on the mountain stage. They were joined by Charlie Parra who performed on guitar as the sports were brought to life by an acrobatic performance. Afterwards, the official song of the Games, "Jugamos Todos" was performed by Guillermo Bussinger, Pelo D’Ambrosio, Sandra Muente and Shantall. The segment came to an end when the cajones joined to form the mascot of the Games, Milco, on the stadium floor.

=== Parade of Athletes ===
During the Parade of Nations, each participating country's team marched into the stadium, preceded by a person dressed as an Ekeko – the Tiwanakan god of abundance and prosperity. The Caral stage reproduced the colors of the corresponding national flag, while the natural scenery of each participating nation was projected onto the mountain. As per Pan American Games tradition, the national team of Argentina, the host of the first edition of the Games, entered first, while Peru as the host nation entered last. The rest of the delegations entered based on the Spanish alphabetical order.

=== Abundance ===
==== Pago a la Tierra ====
Once all of the athletes were seated, the artistic performances continued with a two-part segment. The first part began with a pago a la tierra, an Andean ritual in which offerings is given to Pachamama, or Mother Earth. A group of young travelers witnessed the ritual, who then go on a journey to the top of the mountain. As they climbed the stage, art depicting Peru's natural ecosystems and inspired from Peruvian painters were projected onto the mountain surface.

Once the travelers reached the top, a representation of the Peruvian Amazon was revealed on the floor, with performers depicting the flora and fauna of the rainforest. A shaman was shown witnessing this, and the river became the Yacumama, projected on the mountain surface.

==== Superfoods ====
The segment continued with a celebration of the diversity of Peruvian gastronomy. Various indigenous persons carried a food ingredient to a table placed in the center on the stadium, which was then projected on the mountain. They were then joined by immigrants, each contributing their own food ingredients to the table. The segment culminated with the arrival of Chef Micha Tsamura, who oversaw the table of food from the mountain.

=== Weaving ===
==== Looms ====
Continuing the theme of natural products, this segment focused on wool and cotton. A tree appeared on the caral stage, with mothers and daughters weaving around it. This practice was then expanded to cover the mountain, with performers weaving a larger textile of wool and cotton, measuring 32 meters, over it.

==== The Cutting Edge ====
The segment continued by expanding on the textile theme, with a fashion show taking place on the stadium floor. Performers wearing both folk costumes and contemporary designs crossed the stage as Pauchi Sasaki performed a specialized version of "El Condor Pasa".

The segment ended with a tribute to the tapadas limeñas, who were women who would cover their heads and faces with a cloak and wide skirt, to ensure complete anonymity.

=== Streets ===
The segment began with a continuation of the tapadas limeñas, who transformed into their historical counterparts. Watercolor paintings representing the viceroyalty era of Peru were projected onto the mountain, with performers reenacting scenes of daily life in the era.

Moving to a performance based in the 1950s, Juan Diego Flórez entered the stadium to perform a virtual duet with the late singer Chabuca Granda, whose face was projected onto the mountain. They performed “Bello Durmiente”, followed by a solo from Flórez in which he performed “La Flor de la Canela".

Afterwards, modern day citizens of Lima entered the stadium, reenacting a street scene representing contemporary Lima. A flash mob on the street was created, displaying urban dance to the rhythm of cumbia. The segment ended with the formation of the logo of Marca Peru, which is used to promote tourism to Peru.

=== The Games ===
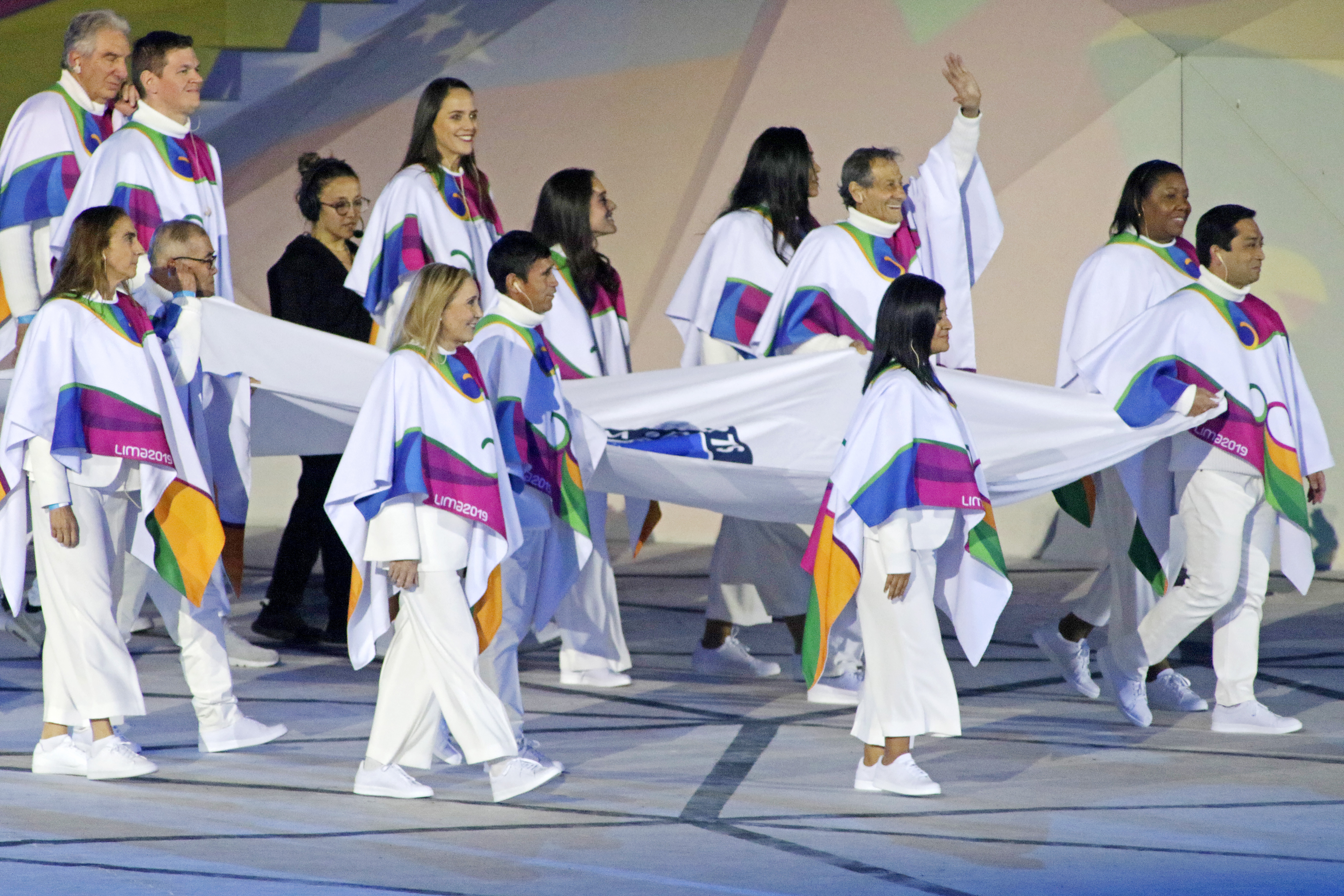
The Panam Sports flag being carried across the stage

The Panam Sports flag was carried by former Peruvian sportsmen including Gladys Euesbio, Roberto Abugattas, Raul Pacheco, Natalia Cuglievan, Luis Minamy, Carlos Zegarra and Monica Liyau, and raised to the Panam Sports anthem by the armed forces.

This was followed by speeches from the President of the Lima 2019 Organizing Committee, Carlos Neuhaus, and the President of Panam Sports, Neven Ilic. At the conclusion of his speech, Ilic invited the President of Peru to inaugurate the Games.

"Dear friends of the 41 countries of the Americas and the world, Welcome to the biggest sports party on the continent. Peru, land of great cultures and an ancient history, welcomes you with open arms. It is an honour for me to inaugurate the 18th Pan American Games Lima 2019". - Martin Vizcarra, President of the Republic of Peru, declaring the Games open in Spanish.

With the Games officially opened, the oaths on behalf of athletes and judges were taken.

=== Inti ===
==== The Relay ====
After a video showing the torch's journey across Peru, a performance dedicated to the pre-Hispanic nations of Peru took place. Performers recreated geometric shapes on the stadium floor, while pre-Hispanic leaders climbed the mountain. This portion of the segment ended as the mountain opened to reveal the Intihuatana atop, connected to the caral stage by a beam of light.

==== The Flame ====
With the cauldron revealed, the torch relay's final leg continued in the stadium. The torch was carried into the stadium by Edith Moeding, Olympic medalist in athletics. He passed on the torch to two young athletes: judoka Ariana Balterzar Minan and tennis player Carlos Fernandez. They handed the torch to volleyball player Lucha Fuentes. Lucha handed the torch to last torch bearer, 1988 Summer Olympics women's volleyball silver medalist Cecilia Tait, who lit the cauldron.

=== The Concert ===
The ceremony concluded with Puerto Rican international star Luis Fonsi performing seven songs which are "Imposible", "Calypso", "Échame La Culpa", "Date La Vuelta", "No Me Doy Por Vencido", "Party Animal" and global hit song at the time – Despacito.

== List of performers ==
- Guillermo Bussinger, Pelo D’Ambrosio, Sandra Muente and Shantall (performing "Jugamos Todos")
- Juan Diego Flórez (performing “La flor de la canela" through virtual duet with late singer Chabuca Granda)
- (Puerto Rico) Luis Fonsi (performing "Imposible", "Calypso", "Échame La Culpa", "Date La Vuelta", "No Me Doy Por Vencido", "Party Animal" and "Despacito")

== Dignitaries ==
- Thomas Bach, President of the International Olympic Committee
- Neven Ilić Álvarez, Panam Sports President
- Martín Vizcarra, President of Peru
- Carlos Neuhaus, President of the Organizing Committee of the Lima 2019 Pan American and Parapan American Games
- Jorge Muñoz, Mayor of Lima

== See also ==
- 2019 Pan American Games closing ceremony
