= 2019 Pan American Games closing ceremony =

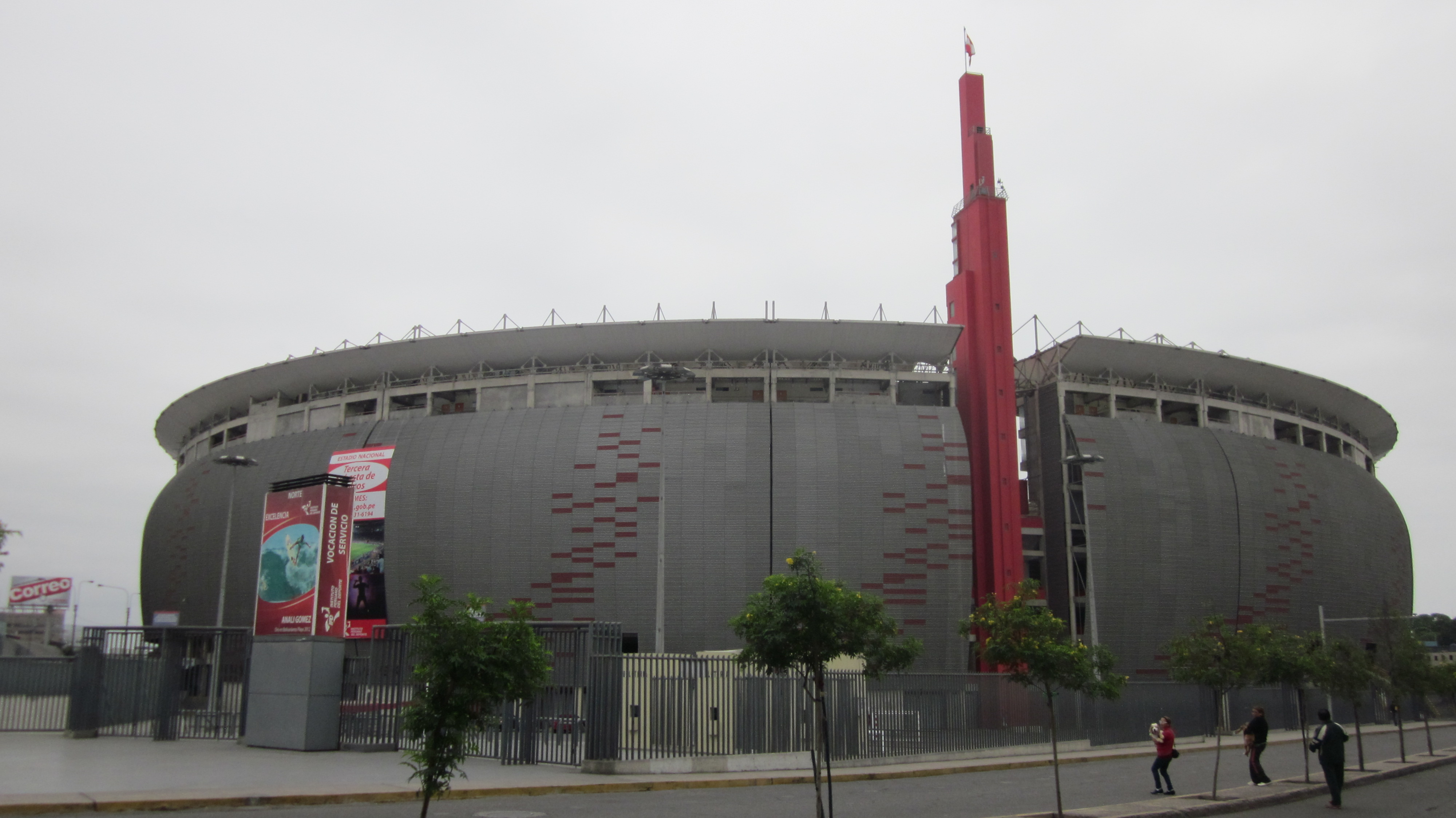
The closing ceremony was hosted at Estadio Nacional del Perú

The closing ceremony of the 2019 Pan American Games took place on Sunday August 11, 2019 at the Estadio Nacional del Perú in Lima, Peru and ran from 20:00 to 22:20 PET. The ceremony is entitled Dance of Diversity and featured a stage composed by fragments of stonework, inspired by the walls built by the Incas. It was produced by Italian company Balich Worldwide Shows and directed by creative director Nikos Lagosakos.

The ceremony begins with the introduction of Neven Ilic, Carlos Neuhaus and Martín Vizcarra and the raising of the Peruvian flag by Peruvian Armed Forces personnel to the national anthem. This was followed by projection of different Peruvian faces on one of the stages to represent the diversity of cultures and communities in Peru. Afterwards, the athletes enter the stadium with the flags of the participating countries to the music set by a DJ. This was followed by display of Highlights of the Games video. A video in recognition of the volunteers effort was also shown after the president of the Lima 2019 Organizing Committee, Carlos Neuhaus gives Milco miniatures to a few volunteers as appreciation. The ceremony featured pre-Hispanic arts and artifacts in pre-Hispanic memories segment, the Moche culture in Mochicas, Arpilleras – the hand-sewn three dimensional textiles and dances from various regions of Peru in Dancing through Peru segment, the latter featured Naysha playing the charango. Later, the president of the Lima 2019 Organizing Committee, Carlos Neuhaus, and the president of Panam Sports, Neven Ilic, give their speeches. Neven Ilic offers a special gift to two young Peruvian athletes and declared the Games closed.

The Panam Sports flag is lowered and handed over by Mayor of Lima Jorge Muñoz Wells through President of Peru, Martín Vizcarra, and president of Panam Sports, Neven Ilic to Sebastián Piñera, President of Chile for the next Pan American Games in 2023. Chilean singer Alejandra Ramirez performed the National Anthem of Chile as the Flag of Chile is raised by Peruvian Armed Forces personnel. A cultural performance from Chile is presented to highlight the nation as next host of the event. It featured international dance troupe Power Peralta Brothers and singer Francisca Valenzuela.

A couple of dancers: Maria Martha Reverte and Alex Donet entered the stage and dance Marinera duet in "Adios Lima", the segment that represent farewell to Lima as the host of 2019 Pan American Games. The flame on the cauldron was extinguished after the Maria the female dancer blew her handkerchief into the air. The ceremony concluded with the Peruvian Amazonia segment, Gian Marco performance of four songs: Lejos de ti, Hoy, Sácala a bailar and Contigo Perú and DJ set by Shushupe.

== Anthems ==
- Instrumental Version – National Anthem of Peru
- Instrumental Version – Anthem of Pan Am Sports
- Alejandra Ramírez – National Anthem of Chile

== List of Performers ==
- (Chile) Francisca Valenzuela
- (Chile) Power Peralta
- (Peru) Gian Marco

== Dignitaries ==
- Thomas Bach, President of International Olympic Committee
- Neven Ilić Álvarez, Panam Sports President
- Martín Vizcarra, President of Peru
- Carlos Neuhaus, President of Lima 2019 Pan American Games Organizing Committee
- Sebastián Piñera, President of Chile
- Jorge Muñoz, Mayor of Lima

== See also ==
- 2019 Pan American Games opening ceremony
