= Ana María Solórzano =

Peruvian lawyer and politician

Ana Solórzano
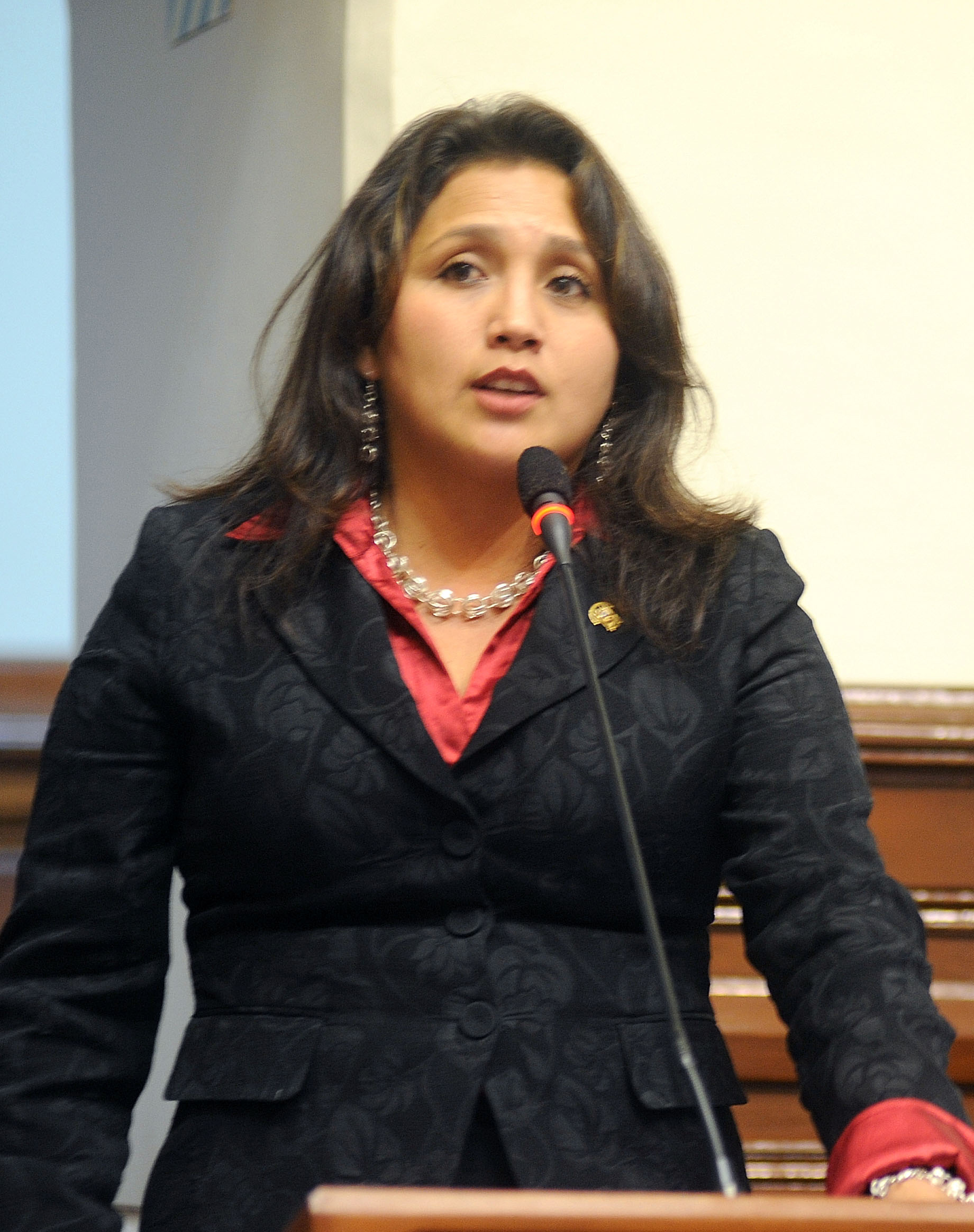

President of Congress
- In office 26 July 2014 – 26 July 2015
- Vice President: 1st Vice President; Modesto Julca; 2nd Vice President; Norman Lewis; 3rd Vice President; Esther Capuñay
- Preceded by: Luis Iberico
- Succeeded by: Luis Iberico

Member of Congress
- In office 26 July 2011 – 26 July 2016
- Constituency: Arequipa

Personal details
- Born: 15 October 1977 (age 48) Arequipa, Peru
- Party: Peruvian Nationalist Party
- Education: Catholic University of Santa Maria

Ana María Solórzano Flores (born 15 October 1977) is a Peruvian lawyer and politician. She was elected to the Congress of the Republic of Peru for the 2011-2016 period, representing the Arequipa region under the Peru Wins. Solóranzo was President of the Congress from 2014 to 2015.

== Biography ==
=== Early career ===
Solóranzo was born on 15 October 1977 in Arequipa. She graduated as a lawyer from the Catholic University of Santa María in 1999, and the following year, she took a course of specialisation in conciliation court. Solóranz later pursued a master's degree in criminal law at Private University of Tacna in 2009, and has held administrative positions as well as being a legal adviser for several companies. In the 2011 elections, she ran for the Peruvian Nationalist Party in the Arequipa constituency. Solóranz won with 59,471 preferential votes.

In the Government's legislative work, she has been chairperson of the Intelligence Committee, the Bureau of Peruvian Women Parliamentarians, and the Parliamentary Friendship League, Peru-United States. Solóranz was also a member of the ordinary commissions of the Energy and Mines Commission, the Justice and Human Rights Commission, and the Consumer Protection and Regulators of Public Services Commission, in addition to being a member of the Subcommittee on Constitutional Accusations.

=== Presidency of Congress (2014-2015) ===
In July 2014, she was elected President of the Congress for the period 2014 – 2015, after receiving 59 votes, against 57 for the opposition candidate Javier Bedoya. The government party won for the fourth time, and the direction of the Board of Congress was decided, although, unlike in previous elections, it was necessary to go to a second ballot to determine the result.
