= Julio Rosas =

Peruvian politician

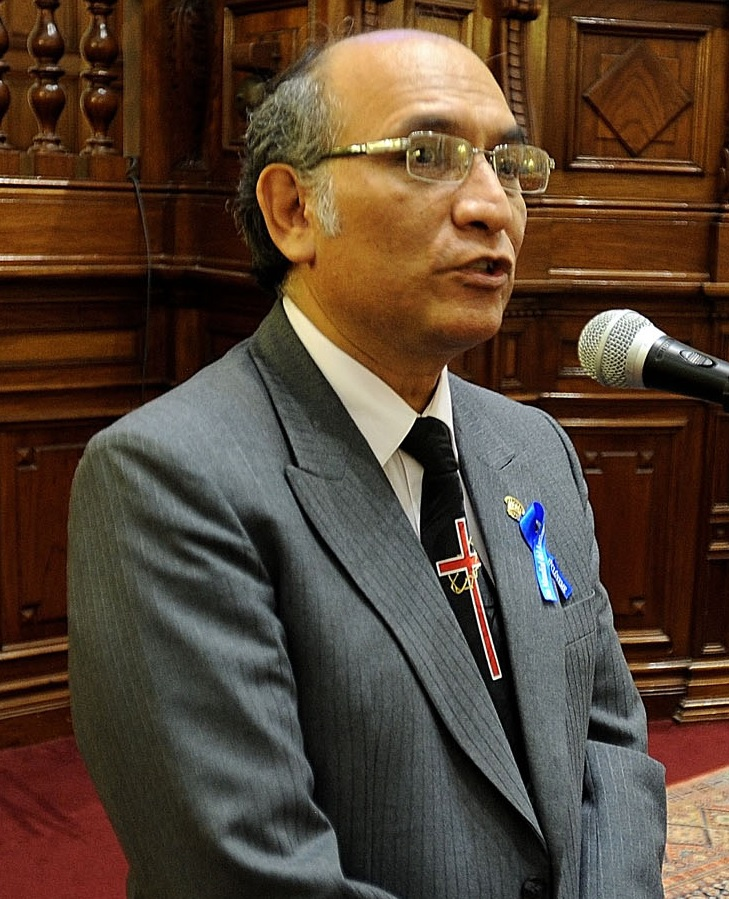
- Former congressman Julio Rosas speaking in 2020

Member of Congress
- In office 26 July 2011 – 30 September 2019
- Constituency: Lima

Personal details
- Born: Julio Pablo Rosas Huaranga; 9 April 1958 (age 68) Santa María del Valle, Huánuco, Peru
- Party: Republican Action (2018–2019)
- Other political affiliations: Alliance for Progress (2015–2017); Popular Force (2010–2015)
- Occupation: Politician
- Profession: Pastor

Julio Pablo Rosas Huaranga (born 9 April 1958) is a Peruvian pastor and politician who is a former Congressman, representing Lima from 2011 to 2019. His term was cut short by the dissolution of the Congress of Martín Vizcarra in 2019. He was originally a member of the Popular Force, but later he switched to the Alliance for Progress, but he later left and joined the Republican Action parliamentary group.

== Biography ==
Rosas was born in the district of Santa María del Valle, in the department of Huánuco, on September 4, 1958. He completed his primary and secondary studies in the city of Huánuco. Between 1977 and 1979 he studied pastoral ministry at the Alianza de Huánuco Theological Institute, dedicating himself to the exercise of his ministry. In 1991 he started the Christian and Missionary Alliance Church in the district of San Martín de Porres in the province of Lima.

== Political career ==
=== Congressman ===
In the 2011 elections, he ran for a seat in Congress under the Fujimorist Force 2011 party of Keiko Fujimori, representing the constituency of Lima and was elected for the 2011–2016 term. Five years later, in the 2016 elections, he ran for re-election, this time under the Alliance for the Progress of Peru coalition and was narrowly re-elected for the 2016–2021 term, defeating Congressman Luis Iberico by a margin of 35 votes. he left the Alliance for Progress bench in Congress in 2017 and joined the Republican Action parliamentary group in 2019. However, his term was cut short by the dissolution of the Congress of Martín Vizcarra in 2019. Since its inception in 2011, it has presented 10 bills of which only 4 served as the basis for an approved law. On the contrary, it participated with adherent in more than 100 projects of laws. However, his most notorious political activity was given with the support of the Con mis hijos no te metas movement, opposed to the gender approach in education and whose spokesman was precisely Christian Rosas, son of the congressman.
