= Fredy Otárola =

Peruvian lawyer, notary and politician

Fredy Otárola Peñaranda
- Official portrait, 2014

President of Congress
- In office 26 July 2013 – 22 July 2014
- Vice President: 1st Vice President; Carmen Omonte; 2nd Vice President; Luis Iberico; 3rd Vice President; José Luna
- Preceded by: Víctor Isla
- Succeeded by: Luis Iberico
Ministerial offices
Minister of Justice
In office 17 February 2015 – 2 April 2015
President	Ollanta Humala
Prime Minister	Ana Jara
Preceded by	Daniel Figallo
Succeeded by	Gustavo Adrianzén
Minister of Labour and Promotion of Employment
In office 22 July 2014 – 17 February 2015
President	Ollanta Humala
Prime Minister	César Villanueva; René Cornejo
Preceded by	Ana Jara
Succeeded by	Daniel Maurate

Member of Congress
- In office 26 July 2006 – 26 July 2016
- Constituency: Ancash

Personal details
- Born: Freddy Rolando Otárola Peñaranda; 5 May 1961 (age 65) Huaraz, Ancash, Peru
- Party: Peruvian Nationalist Party (2005-present)
- Other political affiliations: Peru Wins (2010-2012); Union for Peru (2006)
- Spouse: Mary Salvador Huamán
- Relatives: Alberto Otárola (brother)
- Education: University of San Martín de Porres Universidad de San Martín de Porres
- Occupation: Politician
- Profession: Lawyer, notary

Fredy Rolando Otárola Peñaranda (born 5 May 1961) is a Peruvian lawyer, notary and politician (PNP). He was a former Congressman representing the Ancash Region between 2006 and 2016. He served as Minister of Labour and Employment from 2014 to 2015 and briefly as Minister of Justice in 2015 during the administration of Ollanta Humala.

== Early life, education and career ==
He was born in the city of Huaraz, where he continued his primary studies at the Antonio Raimondi and Jorge Basadre schools, and the secondary ones, in the Mariscal Luzuriaga of the same city. He graduated as a lawyer from the Universidad de San Martín de Porres in Lima in 1986 and later specialized in Commercial Civil Law at the Universidad de San Martín de Porres in Lima. From 1991 to 1993, he was head of the office of public records of Ancash Region. From 1998 to 2006, he practised as a notary.

== Political career ==
=== Early political career ===
In the 1998 municipal elections, he ran for District Mayor of Huaraz, but he was not elected, placing fourth.

=== Congress of the Republic ===
Eight years later, after his failed bid for the District Mayoralty of Huaraz, in the 2006 elections, he ran for Congress, and was elected on the joint Union for Peru-Peruvian Nationalist Party ticket, representing the Ancash Region. After the alliance split, Otárola sat in the Nationalist bench in Congress. From 2008 to 2009, he was the national spokesman of the Peruvian Nationalist Party. In the 2011 elections, he was reelected for another five-year term, this time on the Nationalists-dominated Peru Wins list.

==== Presidency of Congress (2013-2014) ====
In 2013, Otárola was elected President of the Congress for the annual legislative term 2013–2014. During his tenure, Congress finally renewed the Constitutional Tribunal and the Board of the Directors of the Central Reserve Bank of Peru. His term ended on 22 July 2014, when he was appointed Minister of Labour by President Ollanta Humala.

=== Humala government ===
==== Minister of Labour ====
President Ollanta Humala appointed Otárola as Minister of Labour on 22 July 2014, replacing Ana Jara, who was appointed Prime Minister of Peru. He was replaced in the Presidency of the Congress by Second Vice President Luis Iberico Núñez for just a few days until the new election for President of Congress for the 2014–2015 term. His term ended on 17 February 2015, where he was transferred to head the Ministry of Justice.

==== Minister of Justice ====
In February 2015, he was transferred to the Ministry of Justice and briefly served as Minister of Justice until April 2015, when Ana Jara was censured by Congress.

== Controversies ==
In June 2015, Otárola was assaulted by a taxi driver.

== Personal life ==
Otárola is married to Mary Salvador Huamán. His brother Alberto Otárola served as the Prime Minister of Peru from 2022 to 2024 during the presidency of Dina Boluarte.
