= David Tejada =

Peruvian health figure

Minister of Health of Peru
- In office May 12, 1989 – October 3, 1989
- President: Alan García
- Preceded by: Luis Pinillos Ashton
- Succeeded by: Paul Caro Gamarra

Minister of Health of Peru
- In office July 28, 1985 – June 29, 1987
- President: Alan García
- Preceded by: Carlos Bazán Zender
- Succeeded by: Ilda Urizar de Arias

Deputy Director General of the World Health Organization
- In office 1974–1985

Personal details
- Born: February 27, 1929 Arequipa, Peru
- Died: November 3, 2018 (aged 89) Lima, Peru
- Education: National University of San Marcos; University of North Carolina at Chapel Hill; University of Brasília; Center for Higher National Studies

David Alejandro Tejada de Rivero (February 27, 1929 – November 3, 2018) was a Peruvian physician, surgeon, public health advocate and government official. Tejada served as a Deputy Director General of the World Health Organization from 1974 until 1985. He then served as Minister of Health of Peru from 1985 until 1987 and again from May 1989 to October 1989 during the administration of President Alan García. He is the only Peruvian doctor to be honored and recognized as a "hero of public health in the Americas" by the Pan American Health Organization (PAHO).

Tejada was born in Arequipa, Peru, in 1929 to David Tejada Mercado and María de Rivero. He graduated as a surgeon from the Faculty of Medicine of the National University of San Marcos. In 1957, Tejada received a master's in public health from the University of North Carolina at Chapel Hill in the United States.

Tejada died in Lima on November 3, 2018, at the age of 89. His survivors included his grandson, former Congressman Sergio Tejada.
