= Luis Iberico (politician) =

Argentine-born Peruvian journalist and politician

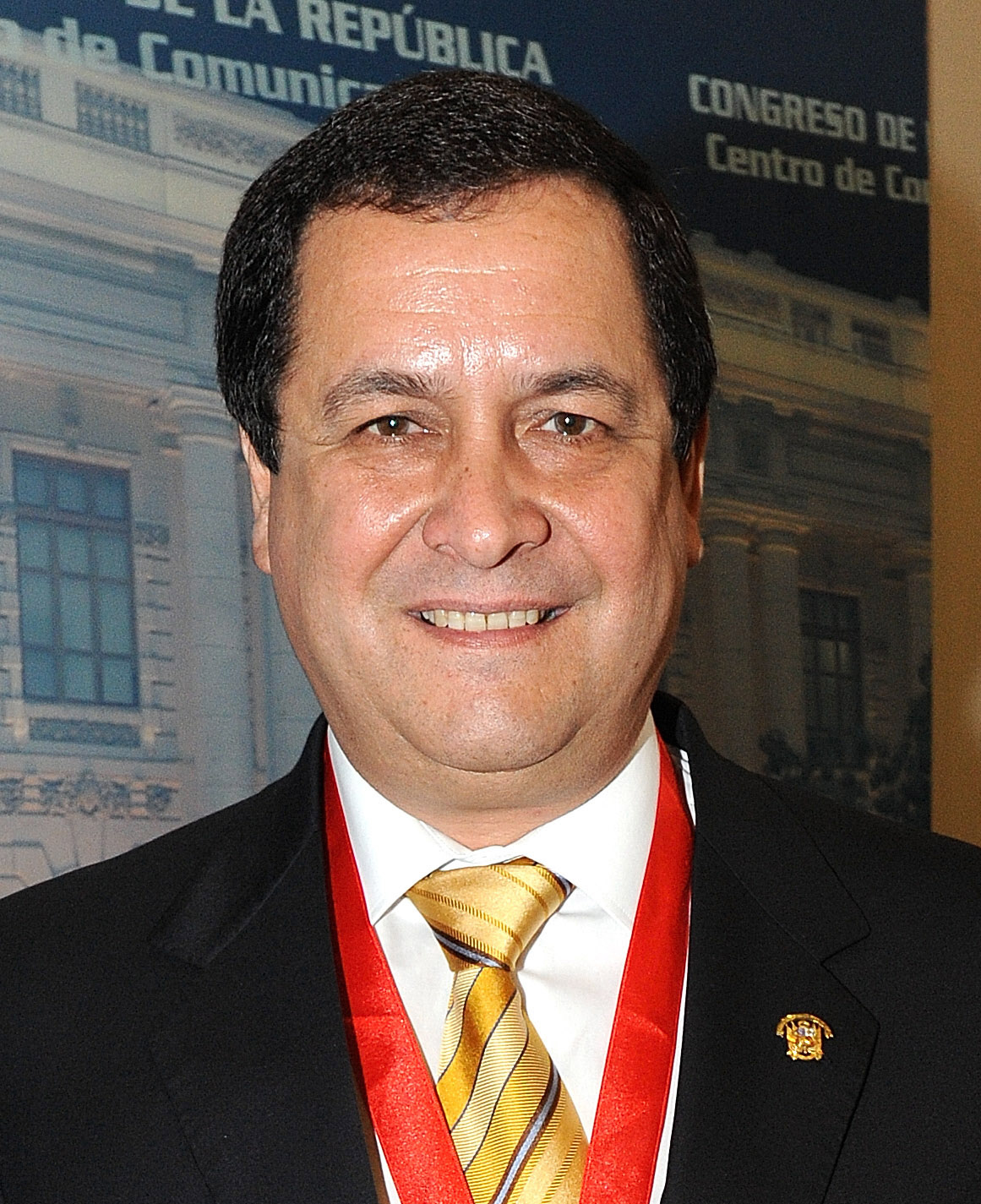

President of Congress
- In office 26 July 2015 – 26 July 2016
- Vice President: 1st Vice President; Natalie Condori; 2nd Vice President; Mariano Portugal; 3rd Vice President; Luis Galarreta
- Preceded by: Ana María Solórzano
- Succeeded by: Luz Salgado
- Acting; 22 July 2014 – 26 July 2014
- Vice President: 1st Vice President; Vacant; 2nd Vice President; Vacant; 3rd Vice President; José Luna
- Preceded by: Fredy Otárola
- Succeeded by: Ana María Solórzano
Additional offices
Second Vice President of Congress
In office 26 July 2013 – 22 July 2014
President	Fredy Otárola
Preceded by	Juan Carlos Eguren
Succeeded by	Norman Lewis de Alcázar
Ambassador of Peru to Italy
In office 29 September 2016 – 25 November 2018
Preceded by	Eda Rivas
Succeeded by	Eduardo Martinetti
Secretary General of the Alliance for Progress
In office 12 July 2019 – 18 October 2019
President	César Acuña
Preceded by	Vacant
Succeeded by	Luis Valdez Farías
In office 7 March 2014 – 26 November 2016

Member of Congress
- In office 8 May 2019 – 16 March 2020
- Preceded by: Edwin Donayre
- Constituency: Lima
- In office 26 July 2011 – 26 July 2016
- Constituency: Lima
- In office 26 July 2001 – 26 July 2006
- Constituency: Lima
- In office 26 July 2000 – 26 July 2001
- Constituency: National

Personal details
- Born: Luis Carlos Antonio Iberico Núñez; 1 February 1959 (age 67) Buenos Aires, Argentina
- Party: Alliance for Progress (2010–present)
- Other political affiliations: Alliance for the Great Change (2010-2011); Independent Moralizing Front (2000-2007)
- Spouse: Gioconda Carmela Bellomo Montalvo
- Children: 3
- Parent(s): Juan Gilberto Iberico; María Luisa Núñez García
- Education: National University of San Marcos; University of Lima; Ricardo Palma University

Luis Carlos Antonio Iberico Núnez (born 1 February 1959) is an Argentine-born Peruvian journalist and politician. Throughout his journalistic career, he served in various news stations during the 1980s and 1990s. He gained prominence for his fight against the Alberto Fujimori administration, denouncing several allegations of corruption involving the press. Alongside Fernando Olivera, he presented the first "Vladi-videos" that would prove the major corruption operations headed by Intelligence Chief Vladimiro Montesinos. His role in Fujimori's downfall would gain him support in a career in politics.

Throughout his political life, he has served as Congressman for four terms, three of them being non-consecutive, between the years 2000 and 2020. He would serve as President of Congress for a brief period of days in July 2014 and for a full-term from 2015 to 2016 and the only opposition Congress President during the presidency of Ollanta Humala. From 2016 to 2018, he served as Peruvian Ambassador to Italy, appointed during the presidency of Pedro Pablo Kuczynski and also served under the presidency of Martin Vizcarra.

Iberico served as Secretary General of the Alliance for Progress party from 2014 to 2016, and from July 2019 until his resignation in October 2019. He was succeeded by current congressman and former governor of La Libertad Region, Luis Valdez Farías. For the 2021 general elections, he is the second running mate of César Acuña. However, the ticket was disqualified on 8 January 2021, due to incomplete information regarding the presidential nominee's income in registration form. However, the ticket was reinstated on 22 January 2021 following an appeal. The ticket ultimately placed seventh with 6% of the popular vote in a heavily atomized election, managing to win La Libertad Region only, Acuna's home, although the party achieved congressional representation throughout the country.

== Biography ==
=== Early life and education ===
Son of the doctor Juan Gilberto Iberico and the nurse María Luisa Núñez García, he was born in Buenos Aires, Argentina, where his parents worked. He was barely a year old when his family returned to Peru. He studied at the Colegio Santa Margarita.

In 1976, he entered the National University of San Marcos to study psychology, but after a year he opted for journalism, going on to study communications at the University of Lima. He also majored in economics at the Ricardo Palma University. He decided to complete his journalism studies at the Jaime Bausate y Meza University's School of Journalism, where he graduated in 1983 with a Bachelor of Arts in journalism. He completed a master's degree in journalism at the Universidad de San Martin de Porres.

=== Journalistic career ===
He began his journalistic career in 1984, working at various Lima newspapers (El Observador, La Noticia, Hoy), as an editor and political columnist. Then he joined Frecuencia Latina (Channel 2), as a reporter for the 90 Seconds program (1985). As the main reporter and political interviewer, he switched to the Contrapunto program (1989). Of his reports, those related to the fight against terrorism stood out. In 1995, he covered the Cenepa war. Between 1995 and 1996 he ventured into the production of ecological documentaries. In June 1996, he assumed the direction of Contrapunto. Under his leadership, the program focused on the allegations of corruption and human rights violations during the government of Alberto Fujimori, which led to the government's intervention against Channel 2 and its main shareholder, Baruch Ivcher. This was materialized with the unconstitutional withdrawal of the Peruvian nationality of said businessman and the taking of this means of communication by minority shareholders Samuel and Mendel Winter. In response to this outrage, Iberico and key Channel 2 journalists quit the company.

He was hired by Astros Producciones (Channel 13), with the project of a new journalistic program, but it proved to be a failure. He subsequently hired as Press Director of ATV (Channel 9), where he lasted till early 2000. Later it became known, thanks to ONE OF the notorious "Vladivideos", that the channel's manager, Julio Vera Abad, agreed to government pressure to withdraw the journalistic programs on Channel 9, in exchange for a substantial cash payment.

In 1998, together with Fernando Viaña, he founded the newspaper Referendum, which closed after a year, again due to government manipulation through the National Intelligence Service (SIN) led by Vladimiro Montesinos. In 1999, together with Fernando Viaña and César Hildebrandt, he started the Liberación newspaper, which became the only written press that stood up to the fight against the regime.

== Political career ==
=== Early political career ===
In the wake of Alberto Fujimori's third re-election campaign, Iberico decided to fully delve into politics. In the 2000 national elections, he was elected to the Congress under the Independent Moralizing Front, obtaining a majority of 97,399 votes. He participated in the popular protest called "Marcha de los Cuatro Suyos" on 28 July 2000, the same day that Fujimori was inaugurated for his third term as president. From his seat in Congress, Iberico continued his fight against the government and presented motions in order to investigate Vladimiro Montesinos.

In August, along with Fernando Olivera Vega, Gonzalo Carriquiry and Francisco Palacios, he undertook the maneuver that would contribute to the downfall of the regime. Iberico contacted those who offered him the video showing Montesinos delivering money to opposition congressman Alberto Kouri, so that he would switch to the ruling party. On 14 September 2000, the video was shown at a press conference at the Hotel Bolivar, its impact being of such magnitude that it finally undermined the regime. Subsequently, Montesinos fled, Fujimori's resigned from a hotel in Japan and a transitional government was established, led by Valentín Paniagua. Iberico's term would be shortened to 2000–2001.

In the 2001 national elections, Iberico was reelected to the Congress, representing the city of Lima, with a majority of 144,671 votes. From August 2001 to July 2002 he served as Fifth Vice President of the Congress. He failed to attain reelection in the 2006 national elections, as the Independent Moralizing Front gained 1.5% of the popular vote, and no seats for the new congressional term as the party failed to pass the electoral threshold and the party would be ultimately disbanded, and Iberico switched back to journalism.

=== 2010 municipal elections and 2011 general elections ===
In the 2010 regional and municipal elections, Iberico was invited to join the Alliance for Progress party, and was selected as its Mayor of Lima nominee for the 2010 regional and municipal elections. Though he would only garner 1% of the popular vote, his presence catapulted him for a third term in Congress, being elected to Congress in the 2011 national elections, after a five-year absence under the Alliance for the Great Change coalition, obtaining a majority of 53,494 votes.

Once again in Congress, he represented Lima in the PPC-APP parliamentary group. Under Fredy Otárola's congressional leadership, Iberico served as Second Vice President of Congress. As Otárola was appointed Minister of Labour by president Ollanta Humala on 22 July 2014, as First Vice President Carmen Omonte was unable to succeed him for the remainder of the term, Iberico assumed the interim presidency of Congress, for four days, from 22 to 26 July 2014.

Iberico was ultimately elected Congress President for the 2015–2016 term, defeating Vicente Zeballos in the challenge with a tally of 70 votes against the latter's 55.

=== 2016 general elections ===
In the 2016 national elections, Iberico ran once again for reelection under the Alliance for the Progress of Peru coalition, but failed after being surpassed in the vote count by 35 votes by congressman and evangelical leader Julio Rosas.

=== Ambassador to Italy ===
In the following months, president Pedro Pablo Kuczynski appointed him Ambassador to Italy, serving in the position from September 2016 to November 2018. He is also a concurrent ambassador to Cyprus, San Marino and the multilateral organizations FAO, WFP and IFAD.

=== Return to Congress ===
He would ultimately return to Congress on 8 May 2019, as General Edwin Donayre was removed from office due to corruption charges and left the Alliance for Progress bench with a one vacant-seat. As a member of the Permanent Assembly, he served throughout the dissolution period until the new Congress was sworn in on 16 March 2020.

=== 2021 general elections ===
In the 2021 general elections, he was part of the presidential ticket of César Acuña as his second running mate. However, the ticket was disqualified on 8 January 2021, due to incomplete information regarding the presidential nominee's income in registration form. However, the ticket was reinstated on 22 January 2021 following an appeal. The ticket ultimately placed seventh with 6% of the popular vote in a heavily atomized election, managing to win La Libertad Region only, Acuna's home, although the party achieved congressional representation throughout the country.
