= Carlos Bazán Zender =

Peruvian medical doctor and politician (1937–2019)

Minister of Health of Peru
- In office 25 March 1985 – 28 July 1985
- President: Fernando Belaúnde
- Preceded by: Juan Franco Ponce
- Succeeded by: David Tejada

Personal details
- Born: Carlos Guillermo Bazán Zender; 22 December 1937 Piura, Peru
- Died: 11 September 2019 (aged 81) Lima, Peru
- Party: Popular Action
- Education: National University of San Marcos
- Occupation: Physician, politician
- Awards: Order of the Sun of Peru

Carlos Bazán Zender (22 December 1937 – 11 September 2019) was a Peruvian medical doctor and politician. He was a Minister of Health in the second government of Fernando Belaúnde Terry.

== Biography ==
He was born in Piura in 1937, son of Paula Zender Honigman and Carlos Alberto Bazán Miranda. He studied medicine at the San Fernando School of Medicine of the National University of San Marcos. He completed a Diploma in Pediatric surgery at the University of London at the Great Ormond Street Hospital for Sick Children in London and a master's degree in Health Administration at the Cayetano Heredia University.

He was married to Nancy Leigh Reusche with whom he had 5 children (Silvia, Marisa, Carlos Alberto, Mónica and Paloma), in his second marriage, he joined Beatriz Landi Bonafé, with whom they had goalkeeper, actor and television communicator Francisco Bazán Landi.

Pediatric Surgeon of the Hospital del Niño, he was the founder and Head of the Neonatal Surgery Service at the Hospital (to date the National Institute of Child Health) and was its Director in 1981, a position he left in 1982. In 1982 he was appointed Deputy Minister of Health, a position he held until March 1985.

He was appointed as Minister of Health by President Fernando Belaúnde on 25 March 1985. As such, he promoted the development of assistance in Peru and created the "Emergency Hospital in Lima" the Emergency Hospital Pediatric "today became a Center for High Speciation in Pediatrics and started the General Hospital of Iquitos and the Hospital" María Auxiliadora "in the Southern Cone of Lima.

On behalf of Peru, he signed in May 1985 at the Pan American Health Organization in Washington D.C. the commitment of governments to eradicate the wild polio virus in the Americas, leaving the new government with the doses of polio vaccine necessary to fulfill the commitment, being that in 1993 the last case of flaccid paralysis reported in the Americas was presented in Pichanaqui, Peru.

He has been Executive Secretary (Elected and Reelected) of the Andean Organization for Health Cooperation Hipólito Unanue Agreement for the period 1992–1997, achieving in 1993 the reinstatement of Chile away from the Agreement since 1972. He was President of the Peruvian Society of Pediatric Surgery (1978–1980). He presided over the Pan American Association of Pediatric Surgery between 1986 and 1988 and was president of the XI Pan American Congress of Pediatric Surgery held in Lima and Cuzco in October 1988.

He was an Emeritus member of the Peruvian Society of Pediatric Surgery and an Honorary Member of the Pediatric Surgery Societies of Bolivia, Brazil, Chile, Colombia, Venezuela and Spain. In 2005, he was considered by the World Medical Association as one of the "65 Solidarity Doctors of the World". He was Medical Director of the San Felipe de Lima Clinic between 2000 and 2009 and Permanent Advisory Member of the Hipólito Unánue Institute Foundation.

He was a leader of the Club Universitario de Deportes, President of the Commission of Minors of the Peruvian Football Federation, Medical Coordinator of the Peruvian Football Federation before FIFA, Full Member of the Medical Commission of CONMEBOL and bullfighting chronicler of the bullfighting page from the newspaper Expreso. He was president of the Bullfighting Center of Lima for the period 2012–2013, re-elected for the periods 2014–2015 and 2016–2017; and he was appointed bullfighting advisor of Rímac a few days before his death.

== Bibliography ==
- García Belaunde, Víctor Andrés (1988). Los ministros de Belaunde (in Spanish) (1st ed.). Lima: Librería Editorial Minerva – Miraflores. pp. 40–43.
- Gálvez Montero, José Francisco; García Vega, Enrique Silvestre (2016). Historia de la Presidencia del Consejo de Ministros (PDF) (in Spanish) (1st ed.). Lima: Empresa Peruana de Servicios Editoriales. p. 122. ISBN 978-87-93429-88-8.
