= Daniel Urresti =

Peruvian politician and officer

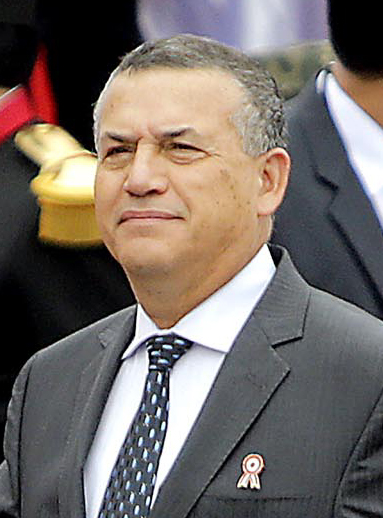
- Urresti as Interior Minister in 2014

Member of Congress
- In office March 16, 2020 – July 26, 2021
- Constituency: Lima

Minister of the Interior
- In office June 23, 2014 – February 17, 2015
- President: Ollanta Humala
- Prime Minister: René Cornejo; Ana Jara
- Preceded by: Walter Albán
- Succeeded by: José Luis Pérez Guadalupe

Personal details
- Born: 25 August 1956 (age 70) Huancabamba, Huancabamba, Piura, Peru
- Party: Podemos Perú (2018–present)
- Other political affiliations: Peruvian Nationalist Party (2016–2017)
- Education: Chorrillos Military School (BMS); Federico Villarreal National University (MS)
- Occupation: Politician
- Profession: Army general
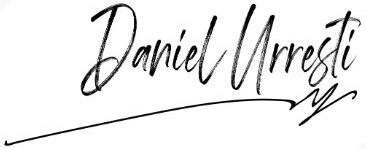
- Signature

Military service
- Allegiance: Peru
- Branch/service: Peruvian Army
- Years of service: 1979–2011
- Rank: Brigadier general
- Battles/wars: Internal conflict in Peru
- Criminal information
- Status: Convicted
- Criminal charges: Premeditated murder
- Penalty: 12 years imprisonment

Daniel Belizario Urresti Elera (born 25 August 1956) is a Peruvian retired army general and politician who served as Minister of the Interior in the administration of President Ollanta Humala from 2014 to 2015, and as a Congressman representing Lima from 2020 to 2021. He is currently serving a sentence of twelve years in prison for the murder of journalist Hugo Bustíos.

Born in northern region of Piura, Urresti enrolled in the Chorrillos Military School, specializing in psychological operations and defense mechanisms. After graduating with a master's degree in electronic engineering from the Federico Villarreal National University, Urresti labored in the telecommunications branch of the Peruvian Army, specializing in telematics.

During the presidency of Ollanta Humala, Urresti served as counselor to the office of the Prime Minister of Peru, and was subsequently appointed as Minister of the Interior in June 2014. During his tenure, Urresti engaged in effective homeland security measures with a very active style and constant demand for media presence, which made him the administration's main political operative and the minister with the highest approval ratings. Facing controversy regarding his media appearances and verbal insults against other politicians, he resigned in February 2015. Although he remained popular following his resignation, Urresti was confronted with murder charges against a journalist who was investigation human rights abuses while he served in the Peruvian Army. The Third National Criminal Prosecutor's Office acquitted him of all charges and was freed in October 2018, after 9-year long trial.

In the 2016 general election, Urresti was nominated for the Presidency by the governing Peruvian Nationalist Party, but his ticket and congressional lists were ultimately withdrawn prior to the election due to low support garnered in the national polls. Two years later, Urresti was selected to run for Mayor of Lima under the Podemos Perú (PP), in which he placed second, losing to Jorge Muñoz of the Popular Action. Based on his performance at municipal level, PP selected Urresti to lead the congressional list for the Lima constituency at the 2020 snap parliamentary election. Urresti was elected to the Peruvian Congress with over half a million votes, attaining the election's highest parliamentary majority.

He ran for President of Peru at the 2021 general election with Podemos Perú. Though momentarily disqualified on 4 February 2021, he was reinstated in the race by the National Jury of Elections on 18 February. In April 2023, Urresti was arrested and charged with the murder of the journalist, being sentenced to 12 years in prison.

== Early life and education ==
Daniel Urresti was born in Huancabamba, Piura on August 25, 1956, to a family of four brothers raised by a single mother, María Elera. Born into poverty, his family emigrated from Piura to the San Martín de Porres District in Lima when Urresti was five years old. At age 14, Urresti took upon diverse jobs to provide for his family as the man of his household, such as a newspaper hawker and at a leather factory. At age 16, he worked as a construction laborer in Ventanilla District, receiving less than the minimum wage. After being laid-off from construction, Urresti prepared to enroll in the Army.

Upon finishing his primary and secondary education at the José Granda School of San Martín de Porres District.

== Military career ==
Urresti applied among 2000 candidates for one of 200 placements at the Chorrillos Military School, in 1972. He was admitted with the first 20 applicants with the highest qualifications. Among his classmates was Juan Valer Sandoval, today a national hero who attained prominence for his leadership in Operation Chavín de Huántar in 1997. Urresti graduated from the Chorrillos Military School in 1978, with the highest honors.

Throughout the Peruvian internal conflict between 1980 and 2000, Urresti led numerous telecommunication networks throughout the Peruvian highlands as an army lieutenant and captain. In 1988, he was involved in the murder of journalist Hugo Bustíos, while he commanded an army patrol in Castro Pampa, Ayacucho. The case remained a mystery until proceedings against Urresti were initiated in 2009.

In 2010, Urresti was promoted to Brigadier General, and under the commanding leadership of Otto Guibovich, led the first telecommunications brigade in the Peruvian Army.

== Political career ==
At the start of the Ollanta Humala administration, Urresti served in the cabinet of advisors of the Prime Minister of Peru, in 2011. He was subsequently appointed Secretary of Disaster Risk Management of the Office of the Prime Minister.

In 2013, Urresti was appointed High Commissioner for Mining Formalization Matters, Illegal Mining Interdiction and Environmental Remediation of the Office of the Prime Minister of Peru. As such, he directed constant interdiction operations and greater control of inputs used in the illegal mining, in the regions of Madre de Dios, Puno, Arequipa and others.

=== Minister of the Interior (2014–2015) ===
On June 23, 2014, Urresti was sworn in as the sixth Minister of the Interior of President Ollanta Humala's administration, replacing Walter Albán, and integrating the cabinet chaired by René Cornejo (and, a month later, by Ana Jara). His image as an energetic military man, who had been working since the beginning of the government in the Office of the Prime Minister of Peru, motivated him to be appointed minister, given the government's decision to implement various citizen security projects, for which needed a head of the Interior to fit in a more executive profile.

As soon as he took office, Urresti announced that he would fight crime throughout the country. He quickly stood out for his very active and talkative style, in constant demand for media presence, which made him the main political operator of the Humala administration and the minister with the most popular support in the national polls.

==== Management ====
- The capture of Benedicto Jiménez Bacca, director of the magazine Juez Justo, in Arequipa, a former police detective accused of belonging to the criminal network of lobbyist Rodolfo Orellana.
- The capture of Rodolfo Orellana and his sister Ludith, accused by the Public Ministry on the charges of land trafficking.
- Operationalization of police teams, made up of young officers in civilian clothes, called Terna.
- In August 2014, six tons of cocaine were seized in Trujillo and half a ton of the same substance in Lima in December. On another occasion, he received criticism for having presented the seizure of a shipment of 400 kilos of cocaine, which was later revealed which for the most part was just plaster.
- Along with the attorney general's office, he denounced the leaders of the Movadef (Shining Path front organization) for promotion for terrorism. Urresti appeared in a place where paintings and sculptures made by sentenced hikers were exhibited, and he had a strong discussion with Abimael Guzmán's lawyer, Manuel Fajardo, in front of television cameras.
- A blow to his image was the escape to Bolivia of Martín Belaunde Lossio, protagonist of a notorious corruption case, which involved the upper echelons of the Peruvian government. Belaunde's presence in Bolivia was released in late December 2014 by then-Attorney General Carlos Ramos Heredia, a few hours after he was suspended from his post, further fueling speculation about the government's alleged interest in his escape.

==== Media exposure ====
- He had a controversy with Manuel Burga Seoane, president of the Peruvian Football Federation, whom he demanded to seek his own receipt, for representing private commercial interests.
- He intervened in support of the Minister of Justice, Daniel Figallo, being pointed out by ousted prosecutor Vilcatoma of meddling in the Martín Belaúnde Lossio case. He stated that Vilcatoma was in the need of a psychological test.
- Journalists from Lima, through their union body, declared Urresti an unpleasant person, for rejecting a dialogue and for making fun of national communicators.
- He habitually used Twitter to respond sarcastically and sometimes insultingly to those who criticized his management or that of the government. His taunts were especially directed against Alan García, Mauricio Mulder and Keiko Fujimori (the latter two used to answer him in the same way). His most controversial tweet was publishing an image that mocked alleged women linked to Alan García. When criticized for turning Twitter into a battleground, Urresti simply responded wryly.

==== Resignation ====
The allegations of police abuse marked the end of Urresti's tenure in the government. During a police operation to evict a Cajamarca home, citizen Fidel Flores Vásquez lost his life as a result of the impact of a pellet projectile on the right side of the chest, and who, despite being fallen, continued to receive blows from police officers. Urresti was forced to admit that in this case there was an evident police excess (October 2014).

Another incident occurred in Pichanaki (Junín), where, during a protest organized by the Environmental Defense Front, a wave of violence was unleashed in which a young student Ever Pérez Huamán lost his life, as a result of a gun shot by fire. In addition, there were more than 170 wounded, 32 of them by firearm (February 9, 2015). Although Urresti initially denied the responsibility of the police in the act, arguing that no police force carried firearms during the security operation, he ultimately admitted that some policemen did carry firearms and would have used them. Urresti assumed political responsibility for the incident, but the opposition in the Congress argued that this gesture was not enough and demanded his resignation.

Although Urresti initially announced he would not resign, he eventually had to give in, despite having a high popularity ratings. On February 17, 2015, the cabinet was renewed and Urresti left the Interior portfolio to José Luis Pérez Guadalupe, until then head of the National Penitentiary Institute.

=== 2016 Presidential nomination ===
On December 13, 2015, Urresti announced his candidacy for the presidential nomination of Peruvian Nationalist Party, ensuring that he had as a starting point of 2% at national-level polls. The announcement was made in a live interview to the Punto Final program (Channel 5). Seven days later, Urresti was proclaimed the Nationalist nominee, alongside former Mayor of Lima, Susana Villarán and former governor of Huancavelica, Maciste Díaz, as his running mates.

Throughout the campaign, Urresti failed in garnering support above 1% of national polls. On March 11, 2016, the Nationalist ticket was withdrawn by the National Executive Committee led by First Lady of Peru, Nadine Heredia, alongside the congressional lists. Urresti disapproved his ticket's withdrawal, accusing the administration for his campaign failure due to lack of funds provided by the party, in comparison with Ollanta Humala's successful campaign five years prior.

=== 2018 Lima mayoral campaign ===
On April 5, 2018, Urresti announced his run for Mayor of Lima with the Podemos Perú party. All this while his judicial process for the Bustíos case was still being aired.

Throughout the mayoral campaign, Urresti recalled his experience as interior minister, offering to solve security problems. At one point during the campaign, an anonymous citizen filed before the Lima Central Special Electoral Jury a request to exclude him from race, stating that Urresti had a suspended sentence of liberty for defamation (according to law, a candidate cannot run having current suspended or effective custodial sentences). Urresti argued in his defense that his sentence was not consented or enforced since he had filed a complaint before the Supreme Court. The jury agreed with Urresti and allowed him to continue in the race. His party was also questioned for serious irregularities in its registration.

On October 4, 2018, the judiciary read Urresti's sentence for the Bustíos case, declaring him innocent of all charges. The election turnout three days later placed him second with 19.7% of the popular vote, losing to Popular Action nominee, Jorge Muñoz.

=== Congressional term (2020–2021) ===
Following the dissolution of the Congress in September 2019, President Martín Vizcarra convened a snap parliamentary election for 2020. Podemos Perú selected Urresti, who had been serving as Security Manager of Los Olivos District Municipality, as the head of the congressional list for the Lima constituency.

After a brief campaign, Podemos Perú placed second nationally, behind Popular Action. thanks to Urresti's 588,763 votes, the party attained 8 seats in the Lima constituency out of 11 nationally. Urresti was sworn in on 16 March 2020.

In aftermath of the removal of President Martín Vizcarra, Urresti asked Vizcarra to call on citizens to remain calm after concentrations continue to be reported in Lima and other regions of the country, since last night, to protest against the decision of the Congress of the Republic and the swearing-in of Manuel Merino to the position of President of the Republic.

=== 2021 Presidential nomination ===
In October 2020, Urresti announced that he will run for the presidency of the Republic for the second time, with the Podemos Perú party. Urresti was subsequently nominated by Podemos Perú as their candidate for the 2021 Peruvian presidential election and formally registered his candidacy for the Presidency in December 2020. However he was disqualified on 4 February 2021 due to inquiries into the internal democracy of the party. Following an appeal, he was reinstated in the race on 18 February 2021, with the National Jury of Elections revoking the disqualification.

=== 2022 Lima mayoral run ===
Urresti later ran for Mayor of Lima in the 2022 municipal elections, but he lost to Rafael López Aliaga of Popular Renewal narrowly with 25.35% of the vote against the latter's 26.34%.

== Controversies ==
=== Bustíos murder case ===
Daniel Urresti is accused of having ordered the murder of journalist Hugo Bustíos in 1988, when he was a captain in the army and head of intelligence in an anti-subversive barracks in Ayacucho. Prosecutor Pedro Orihuela is asking for 25 years in prison for him. Proceedings against Urresti were initiated in 2009.

In the course of the process, Urresti was successively accused of material authorship, mediate (intellectual) authorship, and co-authorship; various witnesses also appeared trying to corroborate the accusation, although many times falling into contradictions.

Hugo Bustíos Saavedra was a correspondent for the magazine Caretas and Eduardo Rojas Arce for the newspaper Actualidad. Bustíos had a history of investigating human rights abuses by both the Shining Path and the Armed Forces of Peru. The incident occurred when the two journalists were heading towards the home of a family killed by Shining Path, being ambushed and attacked by members of the Peruvian Army from the Castropampa Military Base, presumably under the command of Captain Arturo. Bustíos, hit by machine gun fire, was badly wounded; his colleague Rojas Arce ran, managing to save himself. The soldiers then approached Bustíos, placed an explosive charge on his injured body and detonated it, killing Bustíos.

In 2007, proceedings were opened for the assassination of Bustíos of then-Colonel EP Víctor La Vera Hernández, who had been the political-military leader of Castropampa, and then-Major EP Amador Vidal Sanbento. The first was sentenced to 17 years in prison and the second to 15 years. At that time, Urresti was not included in the process. It was only years later, in 2009, when Amador Vidal accused Urresti of having participated in the journalist's murder. The prosecution then filed a complaint against Urresti for material responsibility for the crime. In June 2013, a judge from Ayacucho opened a new process, but this time accusing Urresti of being the mediate perpetrator, that is, for having ordered the murder of Bustíos (intellectual authorship). Vidal's testimony was supported by that of the logistics officer EP (r) Edgardo Montoya Contreras, who indicated that Urresti left with a patrol of soldiers in civilian clothes to the area where Bustíos was killed.

Consequently, Urresti was accused of being the intellectual author of a crime against life, body and health, in the modality of murder.

In response, Urresti pointed out that it was the accusation of a single person (the already convicted Amador Vidal) who did not have any evidence, and that Montoya Contreras' statement was the product of personal revenge (according to Urresti, Montoya was dedicated to stealing auto parts from Army vehicles in Castropampa, a fact that he himself discovered and reported, for which he was discharged; his desire for revenge would have arisen). He also pointed out that for more than 20 years, he had never been summoned to court or as a witness. The Ollanta Humala government supported him. It is also known that President Humala, before electing him as Minister of the Interior, was informed of said complaint and that after studying the matter, he concluded that he had no basis.

However, shortly after, in a new trial hearing, another serious accusation was presented against Urresti: the witness Isabel Rodríguez Chipana, claimed to have seen "Captain Arturo" shoot at Bustíos and that, in retaliation for having witnessed the crime, two days later she was sexually abused by the same character, who threatened to "make dust and ashes" of her entire family if she gave him away. He assured that he had just learned that the then nicknamed Captain Arturo was Urresti himself, whom he claimed to be able to physically recognize him. Urresti, who was present in the Chamber, applauded mockingly and then laughed uproariously, for which the court asked him to leave the Chamber (October 2, 2015). In statements to the press, Urresti denied all the accusations and said that there were political interests behind them, from organizations defending terrorists; even calling Isabel Rodríguez herself a "terrorist."

The head of the Third Superior National Criminal Prosecutor's Office, Luis Landa, asked the National Criminal Chamber to open a trial against Urresti, for being the alleged perpetrator of the murder of the reporter Hugo Bustíos Saavedra, requesting 25 years in prison and a civil reparation of 500 thousand Suns.

On October 4, 2018, the judiciary read Urresti's sentence for the Bustíos case, declaring him innocent of all charges. The election turnout three days later placed him second with 19.7% of the popular vote, losing to Popular Action nominee, Jorge Muñoz. The Supreme Court of Peru would later overturn the verdict.

In November 2020, the Prosecutor's Office accused him as the alleged perpetrator of the murder of Hugo Bustíos. On 13 April 2023, Urresti was found guilty of premeditated murder of murdering Bustíos and was sentenced to 12 years in prison and Urresti was sent to jail upon conviction. In March 2026, Urresti was freed after a court decision by Peru’s Constitutional Court that led to the release of a retired military officer on 3 March. The sentence against him was annulled on the grounds of a new law affecting the statute of limitations for prosecuting this crime.
