= Miguel Romero Sotelo =

Peruvian politician

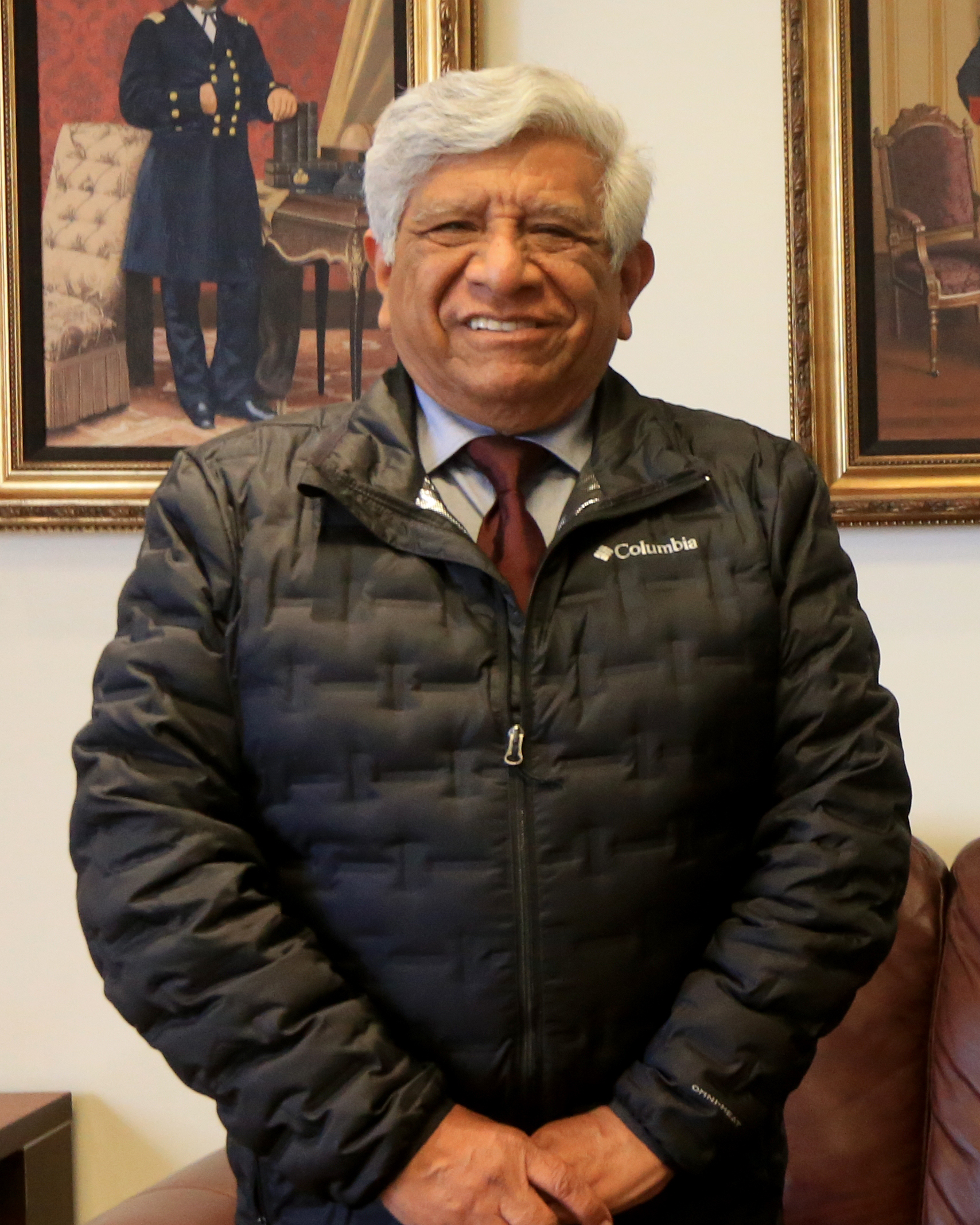

Mayor of Lima
- In office 9 May 2022 – 1 January 2023
- Lieutenant: Jhosselyn Quiroz
- Preceded by: Jorge Muñoz
- Succeeded by: Rafael López Aliaga

Lieutenant Mayor of Lima
- In office 1 January 2019 – 9 May 2022
- Mayor: Jorge Muñoz
- Preceded by: Patricia Juárez
- Succeeded by: Jhosselyn Quiroz

Personal details
- Born: Breña, Peru
- Party: Popular Action
- Education: National University of Engineering - UNI (B. Arch); Saint Ignatius of Loyola University (M.A.); University of Barcelona (M.A.)
- Website: Official website

Miguel Eugenio Romero Sotelo is a Peruvian architect and politician, who served as the mayor of Lima from May 2022 to January 2023. He joined the Popular Action party in 2014.

== Biography ==
Romero was born and grew up in Breña. He graduated from the National University of Engineering. He holds a master's degree in Territorial Planning and Environmental Management from the University of Barcelona and a master's degree in Higher Education from the San Ignacio de Loyola University. He later worked as a teacher for several universities in Peru, and served as national dean of the College of Architects, between 2000 and 2002. He is also the founder of Corsuyo, a design and architecture company.

=== Political career ===
Romero's first political office was Councilman of Metropolitan Lima in the municipal management from 1999 to 2002. He served as Deputy Minister of Housing and Urbanism in the periods 2002 to 2003 and 2011 to 2012.

Romero was elected in 2018 as Lieutenant Mayor of Lima, on the list of mayor-elect Jorge Muñoz Wells for the Popular Action party. On 1 January 2019, Jorge Muñoz and Romero, were sworn in to their respective positions at the Magic Water Circuit. The ceremony was attended by former president Martín Vizcarra. On 27 April 2022, the National Jury of Elections declared the removal of incumbent mayor of Lima, Jorge Muñoz for serving on the board of a state-owned company while in office, with Sotelo being the next in line of succession.

=== Mayor of Lima ===
Romero assumed office on 9 May 2022 and will serve until the end of the year. The swearing-in ceremony was attended by former mayor of Lima, Jorge Muñoz; the president of Congress, Maricarmen Alva; and the deputy mayor of Lima, Jheydi Quiróz Palacios. Romero said during the ceremony: “Fate has allowed me to take office and complete the municipal administration. Time is short and citizens only expect results. In these eight months ahead, it is our purpose to continue promoting the necessary projects to improve people’s quality of life.”

Political offices
Preceded by Jorge Muñoz	Mayor of Lima; 2022–2023	Succeeded by Rafael López Aliaga
