= José Luna =

Peruvian economist and politician

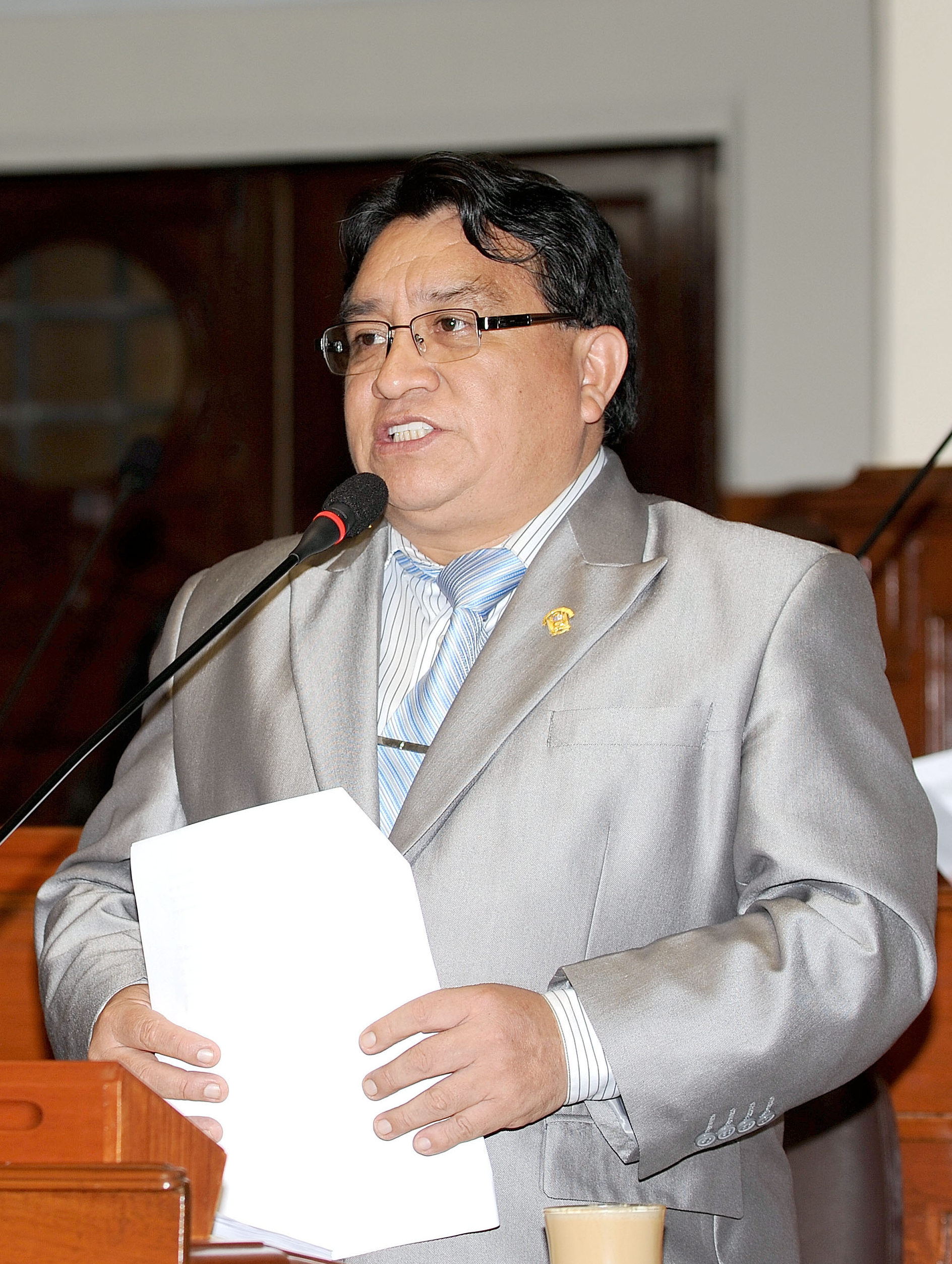

President of Podemos Perú
- Incumbent
- Assumed office 1 October 2018
- Preceded by: Party founded

Third Vice President of the Congress
- In office 26 July 2012 – 26 July 2014
- President: Víctor Isla; Fredy Otárola; Luis Iberico (Acting)
- Preceded by: Michael Urtecho
- Succeeded by: Esther Capuñay

Member of Congress
- In office 27 July 2021 – 26 July 2026
- Constituency: Lima
- In office 26 July 2001 – 26 July 2016
- Constituency: Lima
- In office 26 July 2000 – 26 July 2001
- Constituency: National

Secretary General of National Solidarity
- In office 2 March 2014 – 29 March 2016
- President: Luis Castañeda

Personal details
- Born: José León Luna Gálvez; 17 July 1955 (age 71) Huancavelica, Peru
- Party: Podemos Perú (2018–present)
- Other political affiliations: Independent (2016–2018); National Solidarity (1999–2016); Peruvian Aprista Party (1995–1999)
- Education: University of San Martín de Porres (BA, MA, PhD)
- Occupation: Businessman and politician
- Profession: Economist

José León Luna Gálvez (born 17 July 1955) is a Peruvian economist and politician originally from the National Solidarity party who later founded the Podemos Perú and was a Congressman representing Lima between 2000 and 2016. He was the Third Vice President of the Congress between 2012 and 2014.

== Career ==
José Luna was born in Huancavelica, being the eldest of the five children of Juan Luna Peña and Paula Gálvez, a humble couple who emigrated to Lima and settled in the Cantagallo area, to later settle in San Juan de Lurigancho. He holds a Master in Economics and a PhD in Education, both from the Universidad de San Martín de Porres. He is the owner and general manager of Telesup private distance learning university. In 2004, Telesup became a University.

He also worked in the public sector: he was deputy head of the administration office of the Tablachaca Electroperu Special Project of the Geological Mining and Metallurgical Institute (1982-1983); director at the Ministry of Energy and Mines (1986-1989); Advisor to the Economic Commission of the Senate of the Republic (1990-1992).

== Political career ==
=== Early political career ===
He started out as a member of the Peruvian Aprista Party. From 1999 to 2002, he was councilor of the Lima Metropolitan Council. But he antagonized the Aprista leaders by wanting to control the party by giving gifts and scholarships to the Apristas, and was forced to withdraw from it.

In 1999, Luna was a founding member of the centre-right National Solidarity party led by Luis Castañeda. Since that time, he has been a member of the political commission of the party, and since January 2011 he also has been Secretary General.

=== Congressman ===
Luna was first elected to Congress on the National Solidarity list in the 2000 elections and was re-elected in the National Unity alliance list in the 2001 and 2006 elections. In the 2011 election he was re-elected for another five-year term this time on the National Solidarity Alliance ticket. Between 2012 and 2014, Luna was the Third Vice President of the Congress.

=== 2016 elections ===
For the 2016 elections, National Solidarity formed an alliance with the Union for Peru (UPP), a party, that launched the candidacy of Hernando Guerra García, the standard-bearer of entrepreneurs. Luna joined the presidential ticket as a candidate for the first vice presidency and at the same time ran again for the Congress with number 1 on the Lima list. But the candidacy of Nano Guerra was withdrawn due to low support and with this, National Solidarity kept its registration. That same year, Luna resigned from the National Solidarity party.

=== Post-congressional career ===
In 2018, he formed his own political party, the Podemos Perú (lit. We Can Peru) in which, he serves as the party President, 2 years after splitting from the National Solidarity. On 16 April 2020, Luna announced that he tested positive for COVID-19. On 8 November 2020, Luna was arrested for allegedly bribing authorities to register his Podemos Perú party for the elections, despite not receiving enough signatures to participate in the elections.

== Controversies ==
=== Lava Jato Case ===
The effective collaborator N ° 155-2019 reported that months before a meeting with OAS held in early August 2014, there was an appointment in which Luis Castañeda, the former Odebrecht executive Raymundo Serra, and Martín Bustamante, who was the host, participated.

A few days later, an emissary from Serra gave Bustamante US $50,000. Later, Bustamante, at Castañeda's request, gave this money to Congressman José Luna Gálvez, who told him that the amount would be used to conduct a survey. Then Bustamante received US $150,000 from Odebrecht, in two installments. All this, according to the testimony of the effective collaborator.

After this revelation, the prosecutor of the Lava Jato Team, Milagros Salazar, asked Judge Jorge Luis Chávez Tamariz for authorization to search and search Luis Castañeda's home, in the district of Surco. Also the homes of seven involved in the case, such as Giselle Zegarra and José Luna Gálvez, as well as two offices of the Telesup Private University. The judge granted the authorization and the diligence was carried out on October 15, 2019.

Other houses raided were those of Martin Bustamante, Alfieri Luchetti and Jaime Villafuerte.

In July 2018, Judge María de los Ángeles Álvarez Camacho, head of the First Permanent National Preparatory Investigation Court Specialized in Crimes of Corruption of Officials, issued an impediment to leaving the country against former mayor Luis Castañeda Lossio. A similar provision will apply to former congressman José Luna Gálvez, as well as to Martín Bustamante, former deputy mayor of Miraflores. The same is the case of Giselle Zegarra, former manager of Private Investment Promotion of the Municipality of Lima; as well as former municipal officials, Jaime Villafuerte and Bruno Lucchetti.

In January 2020, the Prosecutor, Milagros Salazar, of the special team requested 36 months of preventive detention for the former mayor, Luis Castañeda; the former congressman, José Luna Galvez; and the former mayor, Giselle Zegarra. This is due to irregular contributions from Odebrecht and OAS to Luis Castañeda's campaign in 2014. It is said that the former mayor would have led a criminal organization from 2011 to 2018, when he ceased to occupy the municipal seat.

On February 14, 2020, the Judiciary ordered 24 months of preventive detention for the former mayor of Lima, Luis Castañeda. While his former collaborators, the former congressman, José Luna Gálvez and the former mayor, Giselle Zegarra, were imposed a restricted appearance for 36 months with certain rules of conduct and an economic guarantee to each one.

== Education career ==
Over recent decades, Peru's tertiary education sector has dramatically expanded, and Peru had over 140 universities in 2019. Many of the 'degrees' are not recognized by any international body.

Telesup was based in a Lima building behind a seven-story false facade; there were only four stories. Vice News described Luna's university as being "lucrative" and "low-quality". Sunedu, the state body regulating higher education standards, published a drone photograph of the site and blocked new student enrollment, giving Telesup two years to close. This affected 20,000 or more students who were required to complete their studies at other licensed institutions.
