= Sergio Tejada =

Peruvian politician

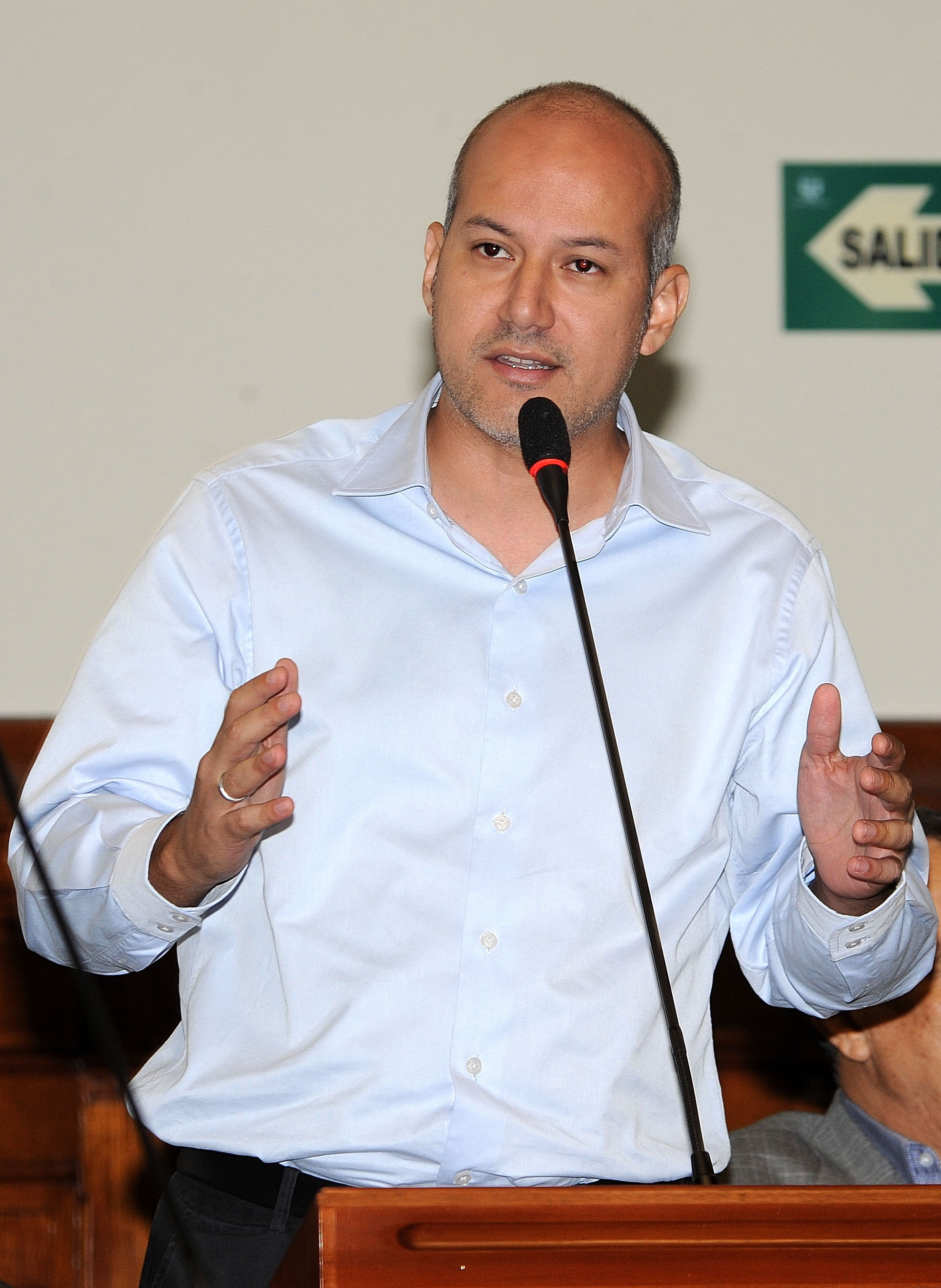
- Former Congressman Tejada speaking in Congress in 2012

Member of Congress
- In office July 26, 2011 – July 26, 2016
- Constituency: Lima

Personal details
- Born: Sergio Fernando Tejada Galindo; 16 April 1980 (age 46) Lima, Peru
- Party: Peruvian Nationalist Party
- Education: PUCP
- Occupation: Politician
- Profession: Sociologist

Sergio Fernando Tejada Galindo (born 16 April 1980) is a Peruvian sociologist and politician who served as a Congressman representing the constituency of Lima from 2011 to 2016.

== Biography ==
He was born in the Miraflores district of Lima on April 16, 1980, son of David Tejada Pardo, who was Vice Minister of Health, and of María de Lourdes Galindo. He is the grandson of former Minister of Health David Tejada de Rivero during the first Alan García administration.

He completed his primary studies at the Héctor de Cárdenas School, and his secondary studies at the Argentine-Bolivian School of Bolivia. Between 1999 and 2005, he studied Sociology at the Pontificia Universidad Católica del Perú.

Tejada was a member of the Political Training Commission of the Peruvian Nationalist Party, between 2008 and 2010. In August 2010, he was appointed National Youth Coordinator of Peru Wins.

In the parliamentary elections held in Peru on April 10, 2011, he ran as a candidate for Congress for the Lima constituency, for the Peru Wins party. He obtained 27,456 preferential votes, resulting in his election as a congressman for the period 2011-2016, assuming his position on July 26, 2011.

During his time in Congress, he was elected President of the Mega-Commission to investigate the second Alan García government.

At the end of 2019, he published the book The Kingdom of Impunity. Revelations of the Megacommission and the fall of Alan García, with the publishing house Penguin Random House.
