= Jorge Muñoz Wells =

Peruvian politician and lawyer (born 1962)

Jorge Muñoz
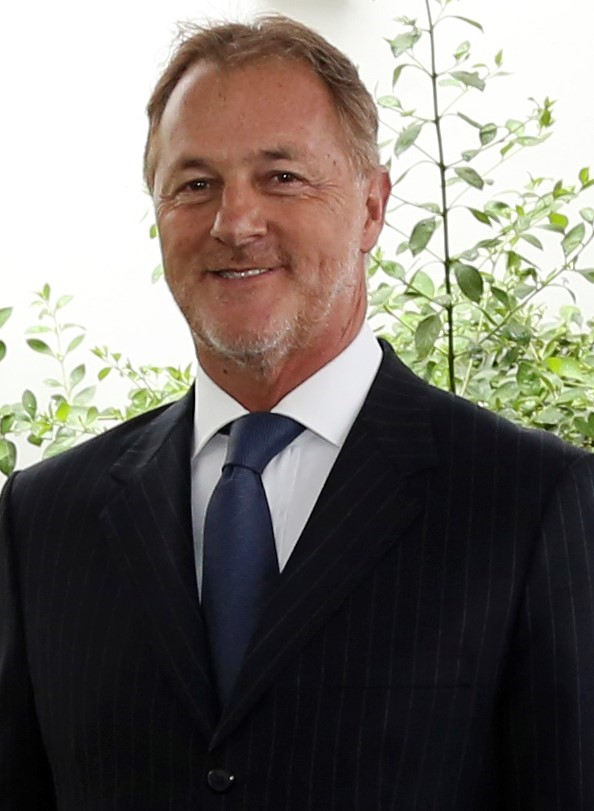
- Muñoz in 2018

Mayor of Lima
- In office 1 January 2019 – 27 April 2022
- Preceded by: Luis Castañeda
- Succeeded by: Miguel Romero Sotelo

Mayor of Miraflores
- In office 1 January 2011 – 31 December 2018
- Preceded by: Manuel Masías
- Succeeded by: Luis Molina

Miraflores District Councilman
- In office 1 September 1999 – 31 December 2010

Personal details
- Born: 13 April 1962 (age 64) Lima, Peru
- Party: Independent (2015–present)
- Other political affiliations: Popular Action (non–affiliated / 2018–2020); We Are Peru (2013–2015)
- Education: Pontifical Catholic University of Peru (LL.B.); University of Barcelona (M.A.)
- Website: Official website

Jorge Vicente Martín Muñoz Wells (born 13 April 1962) is a Peruvian lawyer and politician who served as mayor of Lima from January 2019 until his removal from office by the National Jury of Elections in April 2022. He previously served as mayor of Miraflores from 2011 to 2018.

== Early life and education ==
Muñoz was born in the middle-to upscale district of Miraflores District, Lima on 13 April 1962. His parents were Julio Germán Muñoz Valdivieso and Teresa María Molly Wells Leguía. On his mother's side, he is the great-grandson of Roberto Leguía y Salcedo, the brother of President Augusto B. Leguía, who ruled Peru from 1919 to 1930.

Upon completing his high school education at the Colegio Nuestra del Carmen "Carmelitas", Muñoz was admitted to the Pontifical Catholic University of Peru to study law. He subsequently took courses on citizen security and economic development in Israel, and management in Japan. Later on, he attained a master's degree in territorial planning and environmental management from the University of Barcelona.

== Career ==
From 1999 to 2010, Muñoz was a senior associate at the Muñiz, Ramírez, Pérez-Taiman & Olaya firm in Lima. Previously, he served as Municipal Director for the Miraflores District, from 1996 to 1998.

Following an election loss for the Miraflores District Council at the 1998 municipal elections, Muñoz was elected to the Council at the 1999 recall-election. As a member of We Are Peru, he worked closely with former mayor Alberto Andrade, who served as mayor of Lima. In 2002, he was elected Miraflores' Lieutenant Mayor, serving under mayor Fernando Andrade, from 2003 to 2006. He continued to serve in the council following his party's loss in the 2006 election.

=== Mayor of Miraflores (2011–2018) ===
Muñoz ran for mayor of Miraflores at the 2010 Lima municipal elections, where he defeated the incumbent, Manuel Masías. In addition to his victory, his party obtained six of the nine council seats of the Miraflores District Council.

In 2011, in his capacity as mayor, Muñoz was elected President of the OMAPED National Network Coordinator, a space from which local public policies on accessibility and inclusion for people with disabilities are promoted. Subsequently, Muñoz was elected as a representative of local governments before the National Competitiveness Council in 2012.

At the conclusion of his first term, Muñoz was successfully re-elected as mayor of Miraflores at the 2014 municipal election, obtaining 41.87% of the popular vote. Into 11 months of his second term, he left We Are Peru. In a letter published on his Twitter account, he explained that this decision was due to the electoral alliance formed by We Are Peru with Alliance for Progress, presidential nominee César Acuña's party, for the 2016 general election.

=== Mayor of Lima (2019–2022) ===
On 22 October 2017, Muñoz launched his bid for mayor of Lima as an invited candidate for Popular Action. In May 2018, his nomination was officially launched.

Although, he trailed behind Renzo Reggiardo throughout the polls, on election day, 7 October 2018, he was elected as the new mayor of Lima and the province of the homonymous special regime, being the virtual winner of the municipal elections, defeating Daniel Urresti and Reggiardo. Curiously, his victory occurred on the birthday of former president Fernando Belaúnde, founder of Popular Action.

On 1 January 2019, Muñoz and his 39 council members were sworn in to their respective positions in the Magic Water Circuit Park. The ceremony was attended by President Martín Vizcarra.

On 27 April 2022, the National Jury of Elections ruled that Muñoz was to be removed from office since he served on the board of directors for the state-run Sedapal water utility company in 2019 while he was in office. He was replaced by Miguel Romero Sotelo.

== Recognitions ==
- 2012 Queen Sofía of Spain Award, a recognition of the Spanish government, delivered by the Queen of Spain herself.
- Award for Good Practices in Public Management (2012) in the categories Social Inclusion and Effective Environmental Management - CAD Ciudadanos al Día.
- Award for Good Practices in Public Management (2013, 2014) in the category of Citizen Security - CAD Ciudadanos al Día.

Political offices
Preceded by Manuel Masías	Mayor of Miraflores; 2011–2018	Succeeded by Luis Molina
Preceded by Luis Castañeda	Mayor of Lima; 2019–2022	Succeeded by Miguel Romero Sotelo
