= Podemos Perú =

Conservative political party in Peru

We Can Peru Podemos Perú
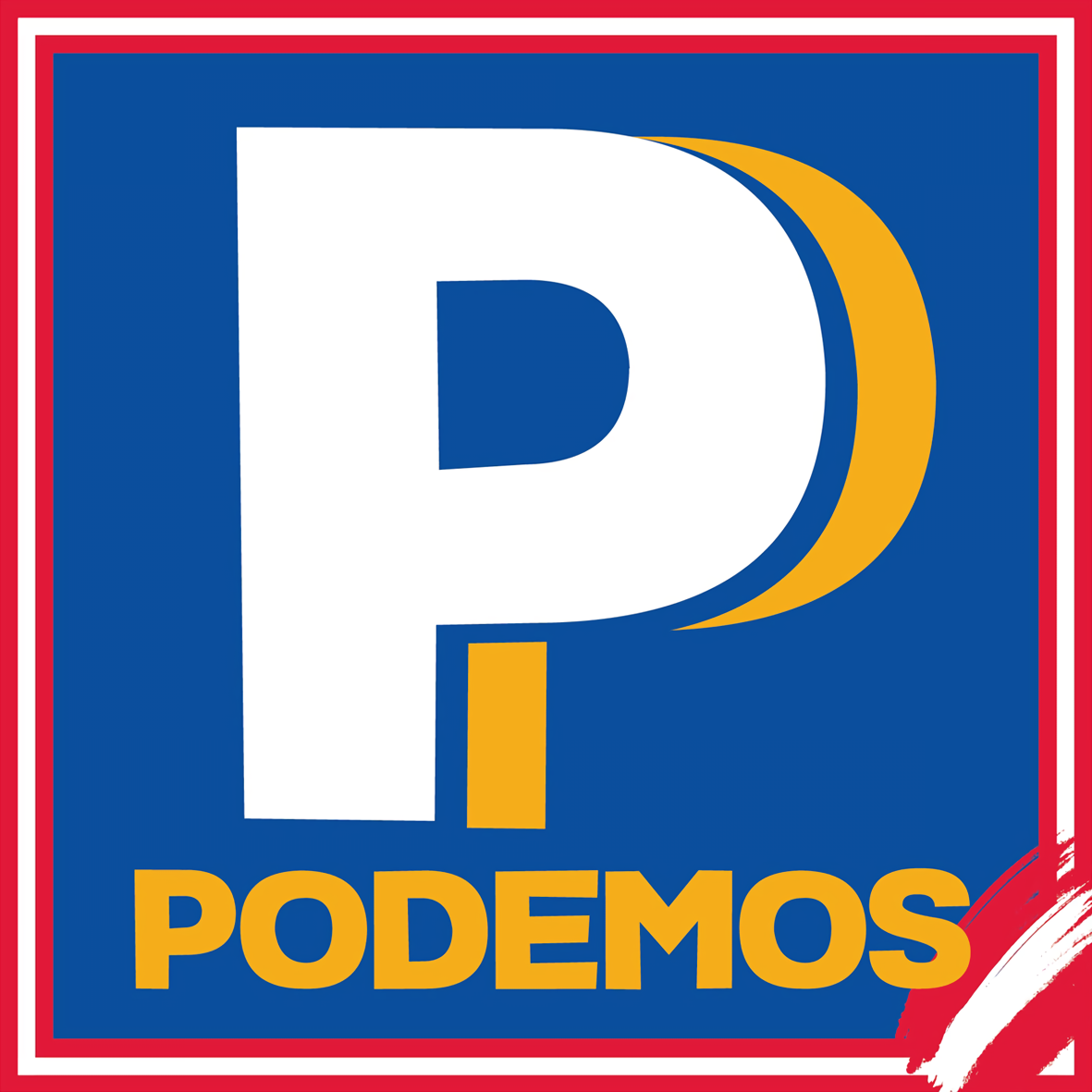
- Abbreviation: PP
- President: José Luna Gálvez
- Secretary-General: José Luna Morales
- Founded: 1 October 2018
- Split from: National Solidarity; Peruvian Nationalist Party
- Ideology: Conservatism; Social conservatism; Right-wing populism
- Political position: Centre-right to right-wing
- Colors: Blue, orange
- Seats in Congress: 0 / 130
- Governorships: 0 / 25
- Regional Councillors: 6 / 274
- Province Mayorships: 1 / 196
- District Mayorships: 39 / 1,874

Website
- podemosperu.pe

Podemos por el Progreso del Perú (English: We Can for the Progress of Peru), more often known by its shortened name Podemos Perú (PP; English: We Can Peru), is a conservative political party in Peru. Founded in 2018 by economist and former congressman José Luna Gálvez, for the 2021 general election, Daniel Urresti was nominated by the party for the Presidency. In the election, Urresti placed 9th with 5.6% of the vote, while in the congressional election, the party won five seats, mainly from Lima, Callao and Ica.

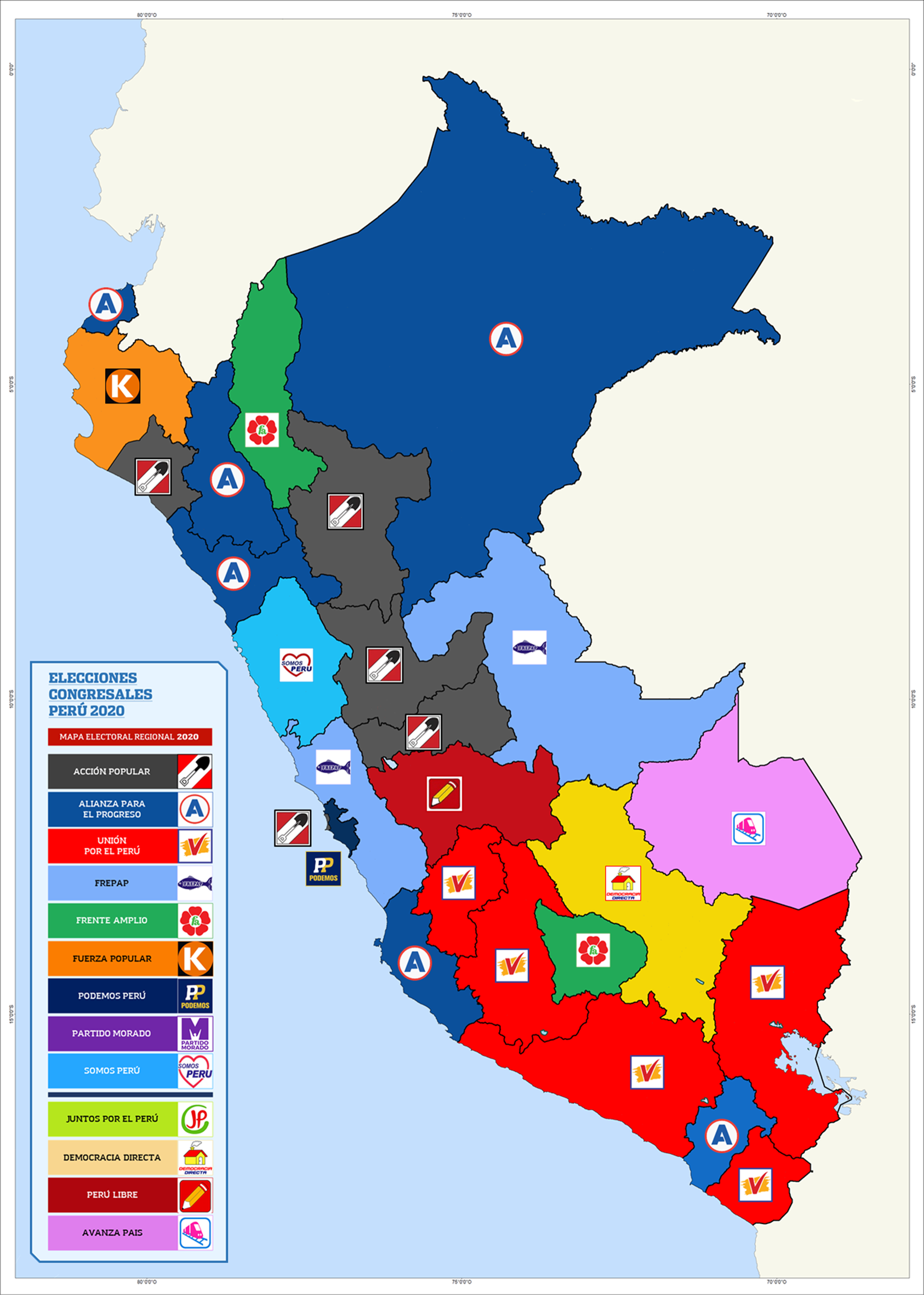
Most voted political parties in the congressional snap elections of 2020, the Podemos Perú obtained the plurality of votes in Lima

== History ==
The legal officer of the National Office of Electoral Processes, Susana Guerrero, was discharged from the party for irregularities concerning the creation and registration of the party. In face of the crisis, Daniel Urresti, then candidate for Mayor of Lima, took over the leadership of the party.

=== 2020 snap parliamentary elections ===
For the 2020 snap parliamentary election, José Luna Gálvez announced that he would temporarily resign from the leadership of Podemos Perú, after being investigated in the case that surrounded former Lima Mayor Luis Castañeda to avoid "hurting the party". Luna, also owner of the Telesup University, said that he did not participate in the elections either "so as not to damage the party." However, his son José Luna Morales did. The party won 11 seats in the Congressional elections in which, eight of them are coming from Lima. The party also received the most votes in Lima.

=== 2021 general elections ===
For the 2021 general election, Urresti was nominated by the party for the Presidency. However, on 4 February 2021, he was disqualified from the race, but he was reinstated in the race by the National Jury of Elections on 18 February. In the election, Urresti placed 9th with 5.6% of the vote. While in the congressional election, the party won five seats, mainly from Lima, Callao and Ica.

== Election results ==
=== Presidential elections ===
Election	Candidate	First round		Second round		Result
Election	Candidate	Votes	%	Votes	%	Result
2021	Daniel Urresti	791,272	5.61			Lost ✗
2026	José Luna	266,768	1.59			Lost ✗

=== Congressional elections ===
==== Unicameral Congress of the Republic ====
Year	Votes	%	Seats	▲/▼	Position
2020	1 240 716	8.38%	11 / 130	▲11	Minority
2021	750,238	5.83%	5 / 130	▼6	Minority

==== Chamber of Deputies ====
Election	Leader	Votes	%	Seats	+/–	Rank	Government
2026	José Luna	379,812	2.63	0 / 130	▼5	▼10th	Extra-parliamentary

==== Senate ====
Election	Leader	Votes	%	Seats	+/–	Rank	Government
2026	José Luna	330,893	2.24	0 / 60		▼11th	Extra-parliamentary

== See also ==
- List of political parties in Peru
