= Presidency of Pedro Pablo Kuczynski =

Peruvian presidential administration from 2016 to 2018

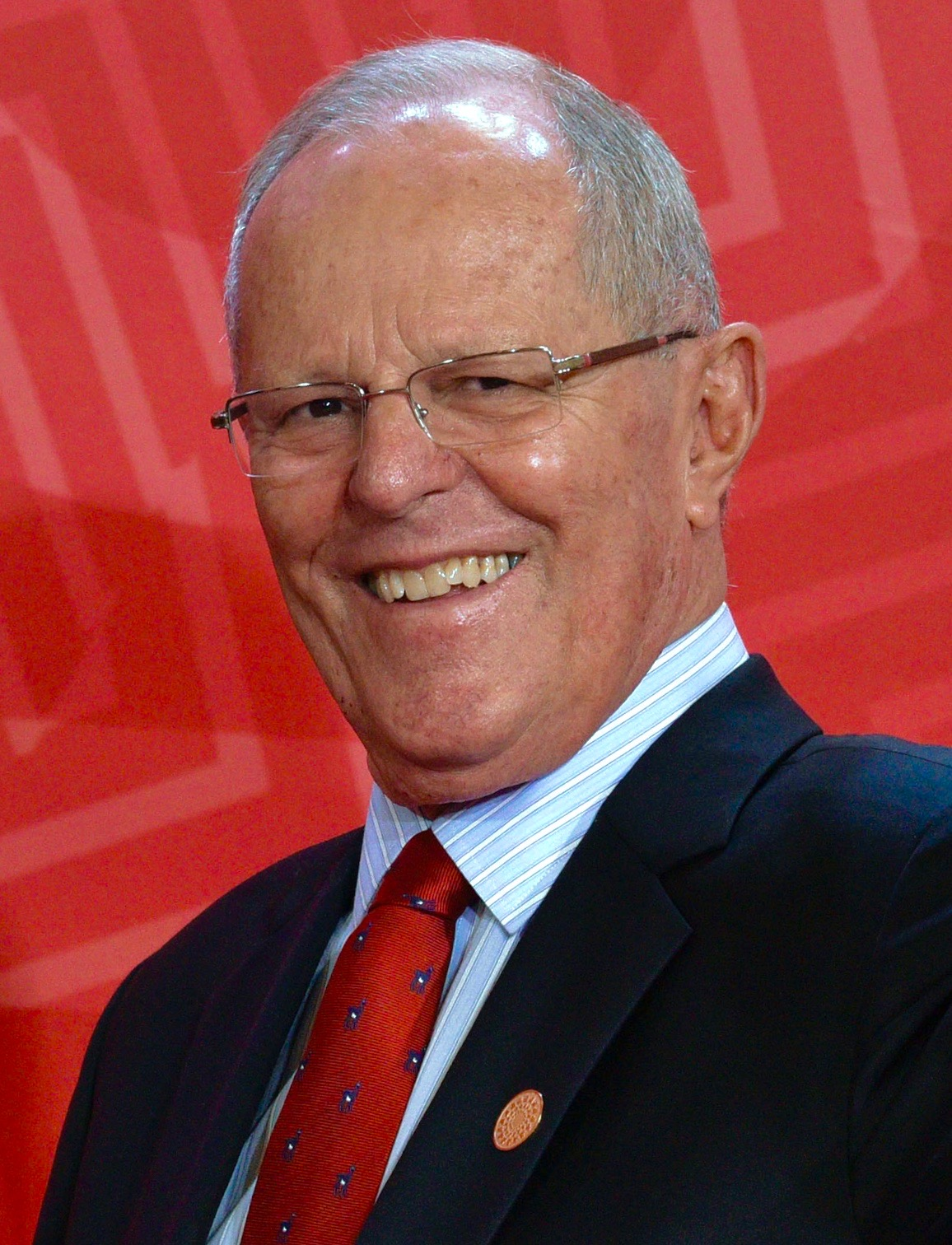
- Kuczynski in 2016
- Presidency of Pedro Pablo Kuczynski; 28 July 2016 – 23 March 2018
- Vice President: Martín Vizcarra, Mercedes Aráoz
- Cabinet: See list
- Party: Peruanos Por el Kambio (PPK)
- Election: 2016
- Seat: Palacio de Gobierno
- Standard of the President

The presidency of Pedro Pablo Kuczynski in Peru began with his inauguration on Peru independence day (July 28, 2016) and ended with the president's resignation following a corruption scandal on March 23, 2018.

In June 2016, Kuczynski won over Keiko Fujimori of Popular Force with 8,596,937 votes (50.12% of the vote). However, in those same elections, she achieved a majority in the Congress while the ruling group, Peruanos Por el Kambio, drew a few congressmen.

From the beginning, relations between the Legislative and the Executive were strained and on September 15, 2017, the Congress denied the vote of confidence to then president of the Council of Ministers Fernando Zavala, with which Kuczynski had to appoint a new cabinet. This included 5 new ministers and was chaired by the second vice president and also congresswoman Mercedes Aráoz Fernández. His government has also been marked by the Odebrecht case. Kuczynski himself was the subject of two impeachments in Congress for its conflicts of interest with the company, the first of which failed. Soon after, Congress pardoned former President Alberto Fujimori, who was serving a 25-year sentence for felonies against humanity. The decision triggered protests in Lima and eight other cities as well as the resignation of three of its ministers and the criticism of a broad spectrum of personalities. National political crisis finally led to a second process of presidential vacancy, promoted by the Fujimoristas of Popular Force. But a few days before the Congress debated the vacancy request, the Fujimoristas revealed videos and audios that showed that government operators, including a minister of state, were negotiating with a Popular Force congressman to buy their vote against the government vacancy, in exchange for works for your region. The next day, the president sent his letter of resignation to Congress, which was accepted on 23 March 2018. That same day the engineer Martín Vizcarra was sworn in as new president, for being in the line of succession as he was the first vice president of the Republic.

The slogan of the Kuczynski administration was: "trabajando para tod@s l@s peruan@s" ("Working for all Peruvians" in inclusive language).

== Transition period ==
The second round of voting took place on June 5, 2016, which Kuczynski won by a narrow margin. A few days after the ballot, he confirmed that Alfredo Thorne Vetter would assume the position of Minister of Economy and Finance. On June 28, the National Elections Board presented the credentials of Kuczynski as president and Martín Vizcarra and Mercedes Aráoz as vice-presidents, in a ceremony held at the Municipal Theater of Lima. On Sunday, July 10, he announced that Fernando Zavala Lombardi would be the president of the Council of Ministers and days later, both announced the members of the first ministerial cabinet.

== Tenure of power ==
The inauguration ceremony was held on 28 July 2016, at the Legislative Palace. It counted with the presence of King Juan Carlos I of Spain, the Latin American presidents: Mauricio Macri, Horacio Cartes, Michelle Bachelet, Enrique Peña Nieto, Juan Manuel Santos and Rafael Correa; Vice presidents Alvaro Garcia Linera, Raúl Fernando Sendic, Óscar Ortiz Ascencio and Jafeth Cabrera Franco; the Brazilian Foreign Minister, José Serra. Among the international delegations was the US Trade Representative, Michael Froman, along with the Assistant Secretary of State for Latin America, Mari Carmen Aponte, and the Assistant Secretary of State for Security Affairs, William Brownfield; also the former Japanese economy minister, Toshihiro Nikai.

In his first speech given to the nation from the headquarters of the National Congress, Kuczynski presented six topics, which, in his view, were of an urgent nature: water and drainage for all Peruvians, quality Public Education, service of public health sensitive to the patient, formalize the country, build infrastructure and development, and complete intolerance for corruption, discrimination, and crime.

== Members ==
=== President and Vice presidents (July 2016 – March 2018) ===
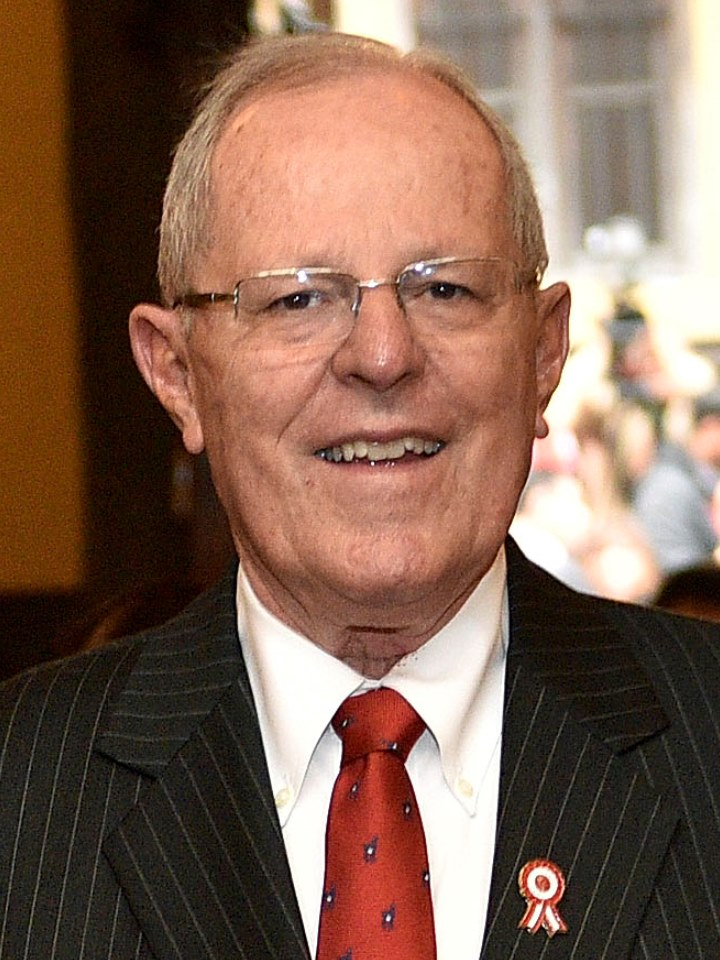
President Pedro Pablo Kuczynski

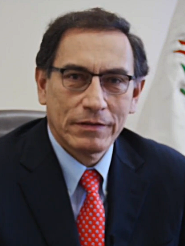
First Vice President Martin Vizcarra

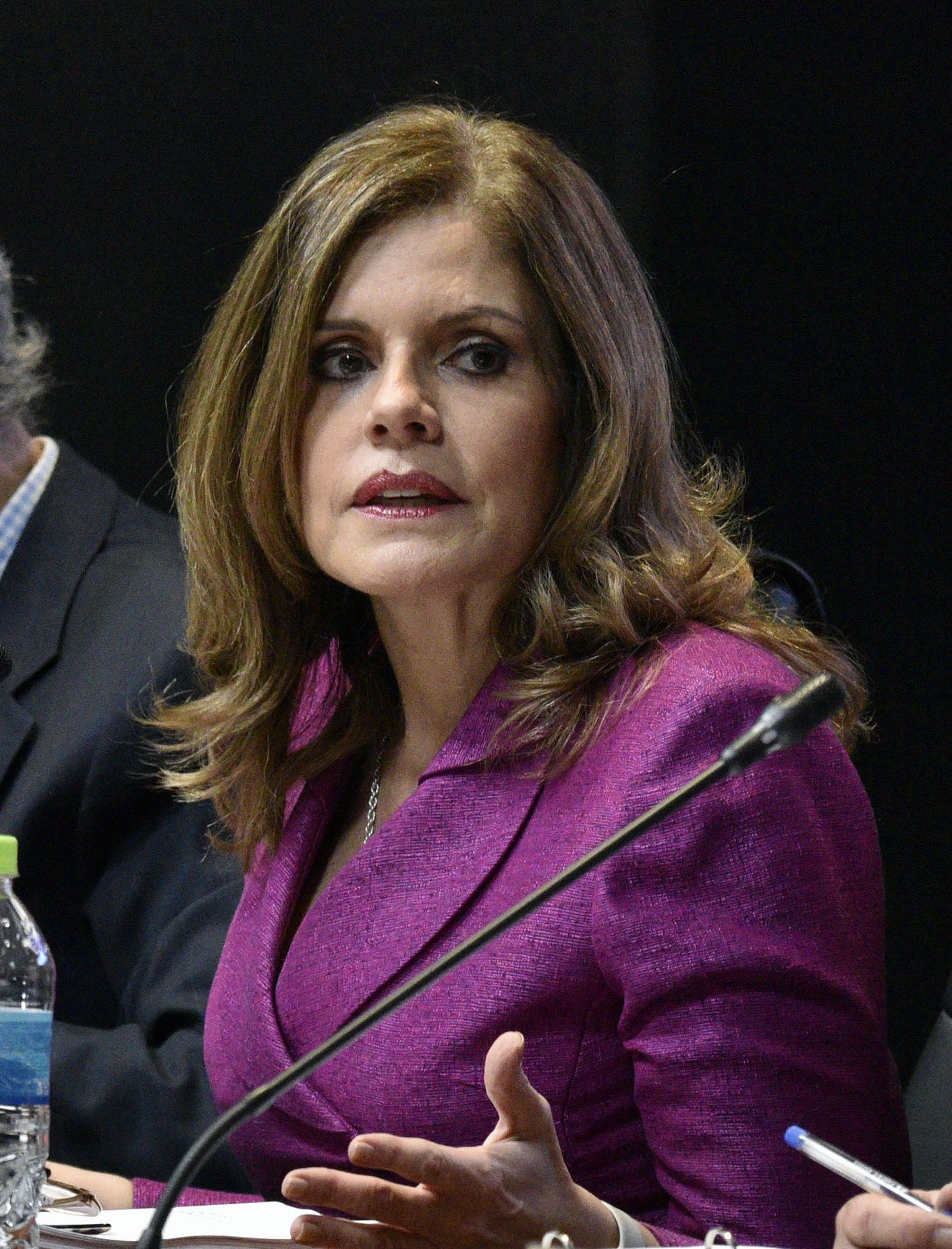
Second Vice President Mercedes Aráoz

=== Prime Ministers (varied) ===
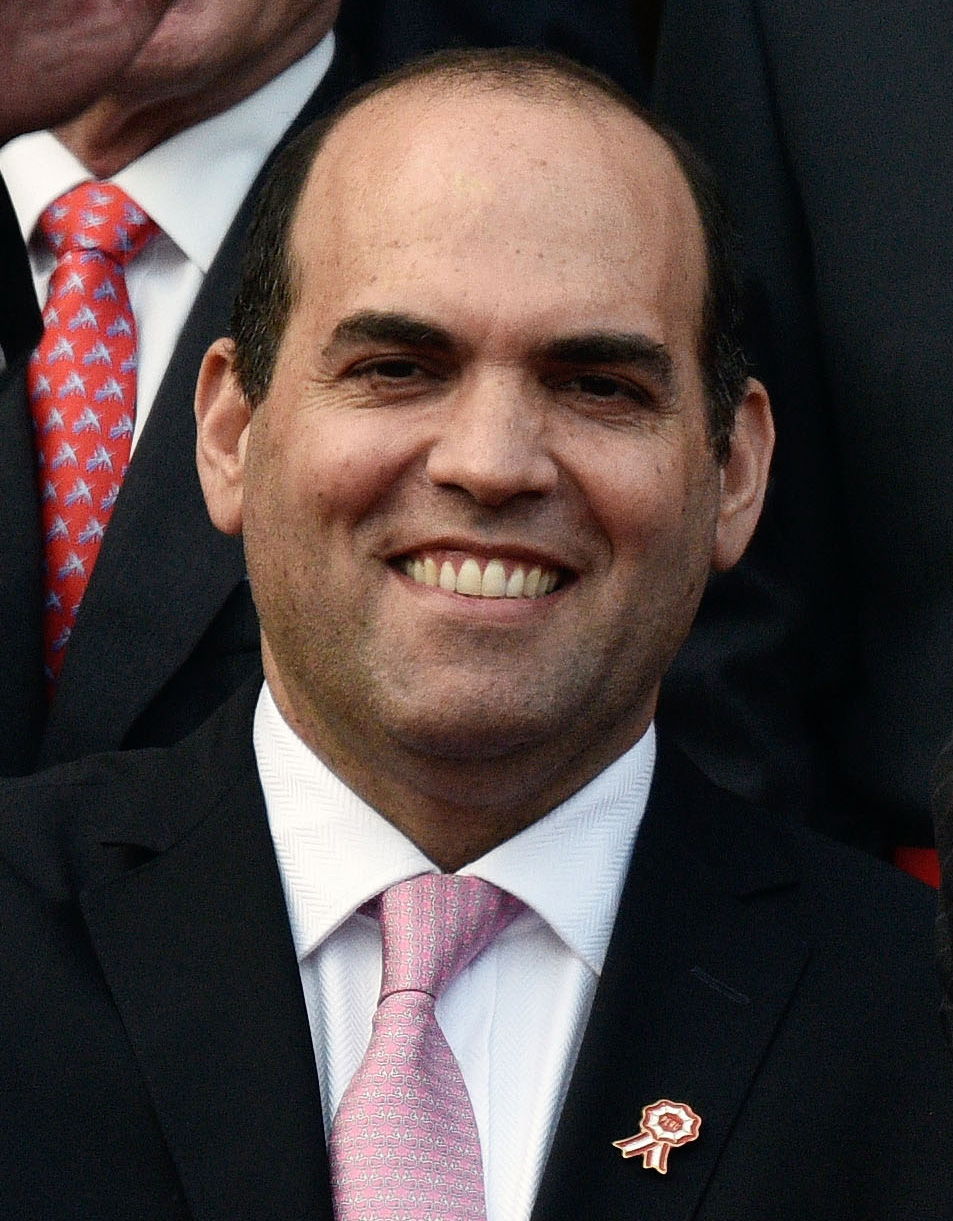
Prime Minister Fernando Zavala
(July 2016 – September 2017)

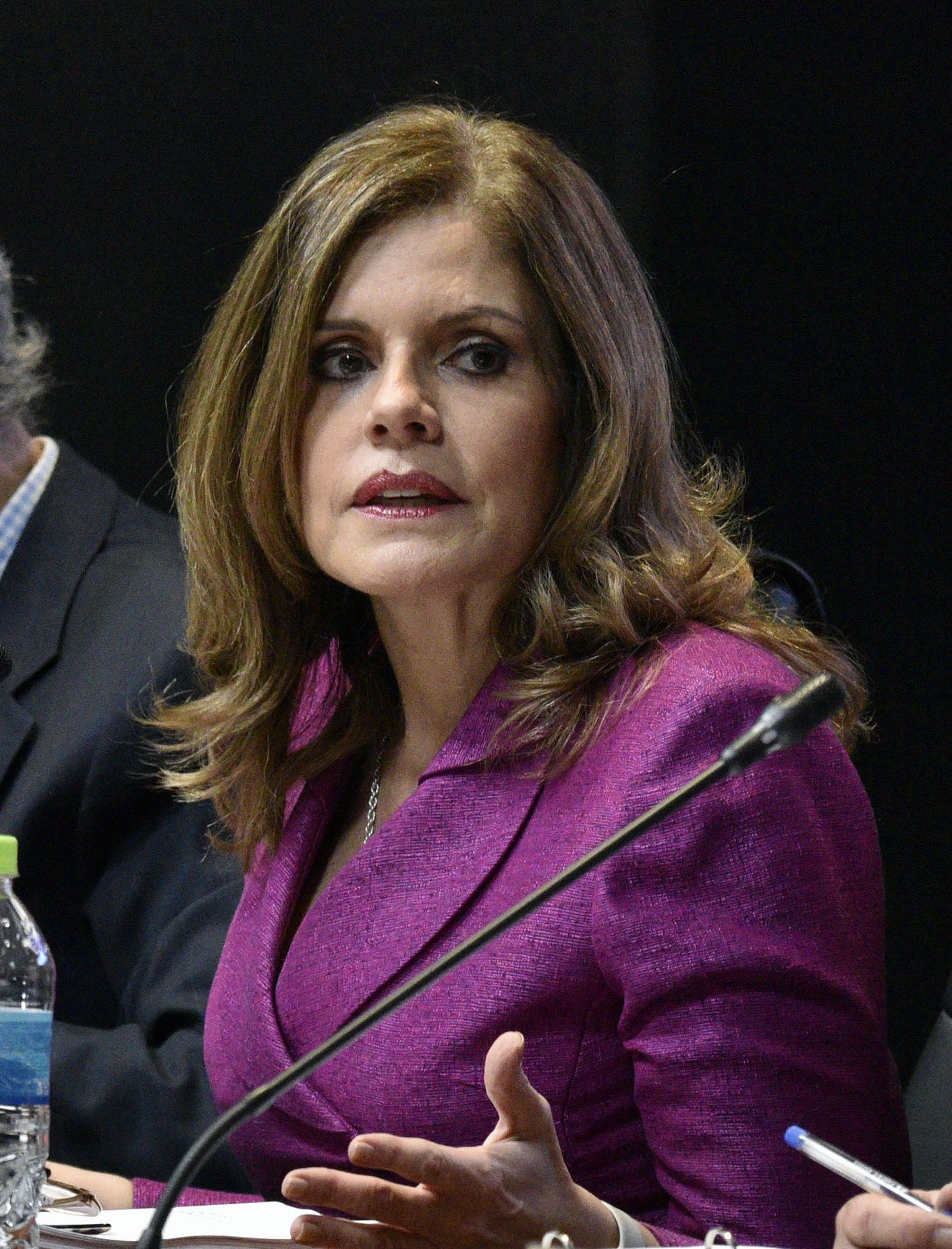
Prime Minister Mercedes Aráoz (Sept 2017 – March 2018)

=== Composition ===
Portfolio	Minister	Took office	Left office	Party
Office of the President of the Council of Ministers	Fernando Zavala Lombardi	28 July 2016	17 September 2017	Independent
Office of the President of the Council of Ministers	Mercedes Aráoz Fernández	17 September 2017	23 March 2018	Independent
Ministry of Foreign Affairs	Ricardo Luna Mendoza	28 July 2016	9 January 2018	Independent
Ministry of Foreign Affairs	Cayetana Aljovín Gazzani	9 January 2018	23 March 2018	Independent
Ministry of Defense	Mariano González Fernández	28 July 2016	5 December 2016	Independent
Ministry of Defense	Jorge Nieto Montesinos	5 December 2016	9 January 2018	Independent
Ministry of Defense	Jorge Kisic Wagner	9 January 2018	23 March 2018	TPP
Ministry of Economy and Finance	Alfredo Thorne Vetter	28 July 2016	23 June 2017	Independent
Ministry of Economy and Finance	Fernando Zavala Lombardi	23 June 2017	17 September 2017	Independent
Ministry of Economy and Finance	Claudia Cooper Fort	17 September 2017	23 March 2018	Independent
Ministry of the Interior	Carlos Basombrío Iglesias	28 July 2016	27 December 2017	Independent
Ministry of the Interior	Vicente Romero Fernández	27 December 2017	23 March 2018	Independent
Ministry of Justice and Human Rights	Marisol Pérez Tello	28 July 2016	17 September 2017	PPC
Ministry of Justice and Human Rights	Enrique Mendoza Ramírez	17 September 2017	23 March 2018	Independent
Ministry of Education	Jaime Saavedra Chanduví	28 July 2016	18 December 2016	Independent
Ministry of Education	Marilú Martens Cortés	18 December 2016	17 September 2017	Independent
Ministry of Education	Idel Vexler Talledo	17 September 2017	23 March 2018	Independent
Ministry of Health	Patricia García Funegra	28 July 2016	17 September 2017	Independent
Ministry of Health	Fernando d'Alessio Ipinza	17 September 2017	9 January 2018	Independent
Ministry of Health	Abel Salinas Rivas	9 January 2018	23 March 2018	PAP
Ministry of Agriculture	José Manuel Hernández Calderón	28 July 2016	9 January 2018	Independent
Ministry of Agriculture	José Arista Arbildo	9 January 2018	23 March 2018	Independent
Ministry of Labour and Promotion of Employment	Alfonso Grados Carraro	28 July 2016	9 January 2018	PPK
Ministry of Labour and Promotion of Employment	Javier Barreda Jara	9 January 2018	23 March 2018	PAP
Ministry of Production	Bruno Giuffra Monteverde	28 July 2016	25 May 2017	Independent
Ministry of Production	Pedro Olaechea Álvarez-Calderón	25 May 2017	9 January 2018	Independent
Ministry of Production	Lieneke Schol Calle	9 January 2018	23 March 2018	Independent
Ministry of Foreign Trade and Tourism	Eduardo Ferreyros Kuppers	28 July 2016	23 March 2018	Independent
Ministry of Energy and Mines	Gonzalo Tamayo Flores	28 July 2016	27 July 2017	Independent
Ministry of Energy and Mines	Cayetana Aljovín Gazzani	27 July 2017	9 January 2018	Independent
Ministry of Energy and Mines	Ángela Grossheim Barrientos	9 January 2018	23 March 2018	Independent
Ministry of Transportation and Communications	Martín Vizcarra Cornejo	28 July 2016	25 May 2017	Independent
Ministry of Transportation and Communications	Bruno Giuffra Monteverde	25 May 2017	23 March 2018	Independent
Ministry of Housing, Construction and Sanitation	Edmer Trujillo Mori	28 July 2016	17 September 2017	Independent
Ministry of Housing, Construction and Sanitation	Carlos Bruce Montes de Oca	17 September 2017	23 March 2018	Independent
Ministry of Women and Vulnerable Populations	Ana María Romero-Lozada Lauezzari	28 July 2016	27 July 2017	Independent
Ministry of Women and Vulnerable Populations	Ana María Choquehuanca de Villanueva	27 July 2017	23 March 2018	Independent
Ministry of Environment	Elsa Patricia Galarza Contreras	28 July 2016	23 March 2018	Independent
Ministry of Culture	Jorge Nieto Montesino	28 July 2016	5 December 2016	Independent
Ministry of Culture	Salvador del Solar Labarthe	5 December 2016	9 January 2018	Independent
Ministry of Culture	Alejandro Neyra Sánchez	9 January 2018	23 March 2018	Independent
Ministry of Development and Social Inclusion	Cayetana Aljovín Gazzani	28 July 2016	27 July 2017	Independent
Ministry of Development and Social Inclusion	Fiorella Molinelli	27 July 2017	9 January 2018	Independent
Ministry of Development and Social Inclusion	Jorge Meléndez Celis	9 January 2018	23 March 2018	PPK

== Political climate ==
=== First ministerial cabinet ===
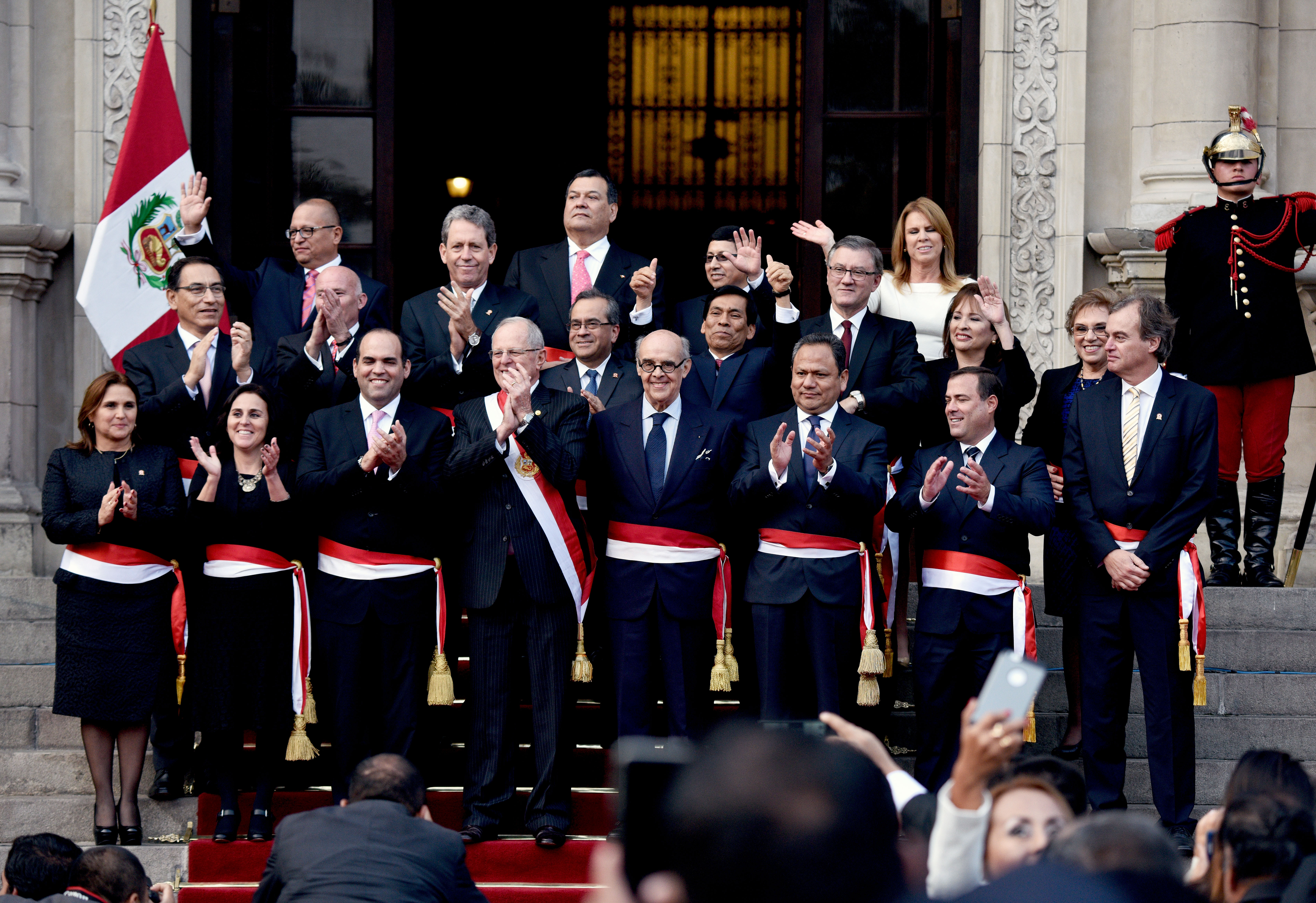
President Pedro Pablo Kuczynski alongside his newly inaugurated ministerial cabinet in 2017.

On 28 July 2016, the Ministers of State were sworn in as part of the inauguration ceremony. The swearing-in, unlike previous occasions in which it had been held in the Golden Hall of the Government Palace, was held this time in the courtyard of honor, outdoors and in full view of the public.

The ministerial cabinet consisted of: Fernando Zavala (Prime minister); Víctor Ricardo Luna Mendoza (Foreign Affairs); Mariano González Fernández (Defense); Alfredo Thorne (Economy and Finance); Carlos Basombrío Iglesias (Interior); Marisol Pérez Tello (Justice and Human Rights); Jaime Saavedra (Education); Patricia García Funegra (Health); José Manuel Hernández Calderón (Agriculture and Irrigation); Alfonso Grados Carraro (Labour); Bruno Giuffra (Production); Eduardo Ferreyros Küppers (Foreign Trade and Tourism); Gonzalo Tamayo (Energy and Mines); Martín Vizcarra (Transport and Communications); Edmer Trujillo Mori (Housing, Construction and Sanitation); Ana María Romero-Lozada (Woman and Vulnerable Populations); Elsa Galarza (Environment); Jorge Nieto Montesinos (Culture); and Cayetana Aljovín (Development and Social Inclusion).

Of the members of the cabinet, six were economists (Zavala, Thorne, Saavedra, Tamayo, Giuffra and Galarza). Some of them had previously held a ministerial position: Zavala had been head of the economy in 2005–2006 during the mandate of Alejandro Toledo; Romero-Lozada was Minister of Women twice, also during the mandate of Alejandro Toledo; Ferreyros was in Foreign Trade in 2010 (during Alan García's second tenure); and Saavedra was Minister of Education since 2013 (during Ollanta Humala's mandate. On the other hand, the lack of equity in terms of gender was questioned, since it was made up of 14 men and 5 women.

=== Vote of confidence ===
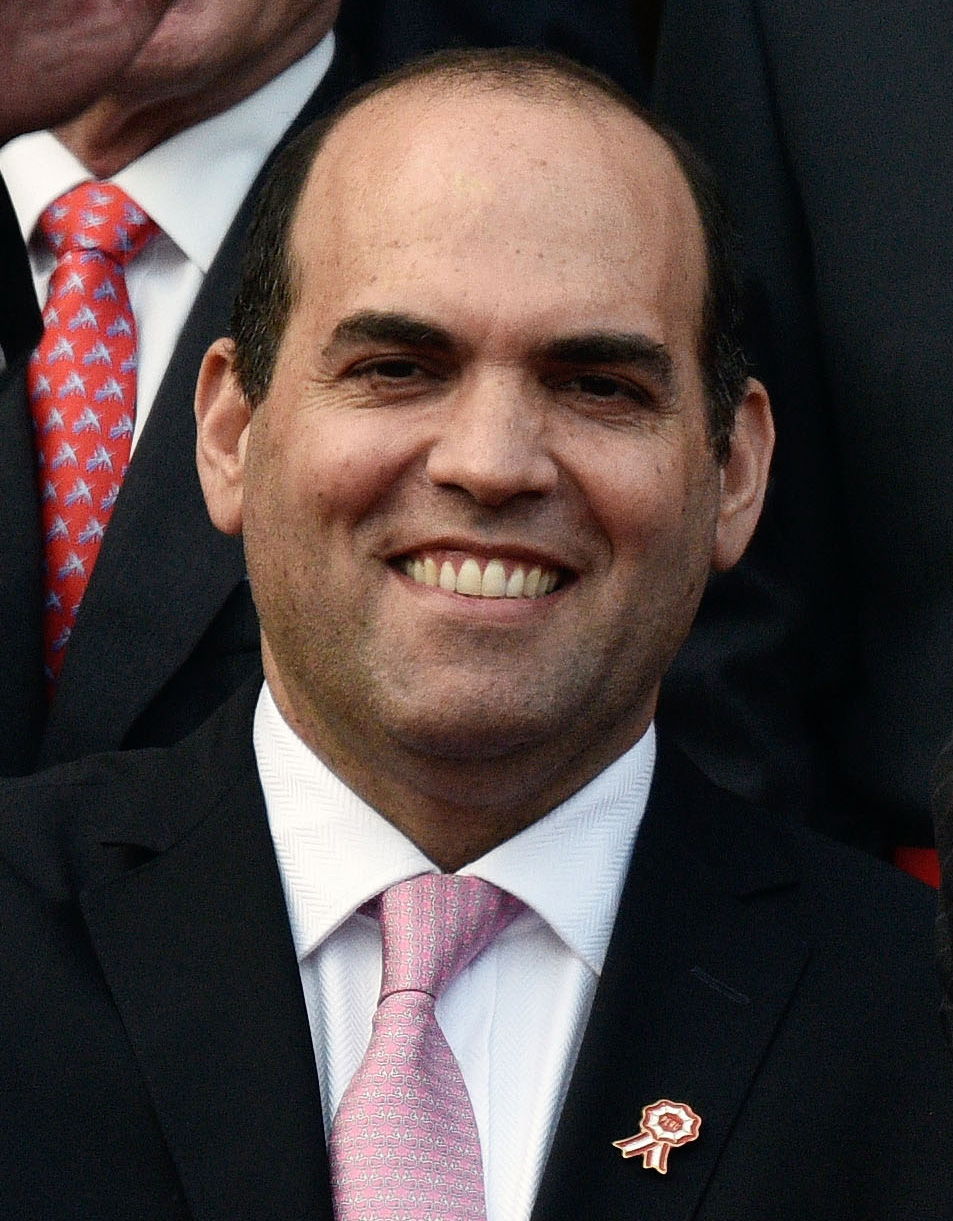
Prime Minister Fernando Zavala, head of Kuczynski's first ministerial cabinet.

On 18 August 2016, Prime Minister Fernando Zavala appeared before the plenary of the Congress of the Republic of Peru to request a vote of confidence from his cabinet, in accordance with the constitutional norm. In a speech that lasted two hours, he presented in four blocks the main issues to consider: opportunities, social investment, water and infrastructure; citizen security and fight against corruption; employment, formalization and reactivation of the economy; and bringing the state closer to the citizen. He highlighted the progress made by each of the last five governments, including that of Alberto Fujimori. Although there were doubts that a Congress, which had an absolute majority opposed to the government (represented by the 73 members of Popular Force of a total of 130) could easily grant the vote of confidence, after a long debate that lasted 21 hours, it was approved, with 121 votes in favor, 2 against and one abstention.

=== Granting of legislative powers ===
Another moment of tension between the Executive and the Congress came when the former asked the latter to grant powers to legislate on economic matters, citizen security, anti-corruption, water and sanitation, and the reorganization of Petroperú. On 30 September 2016, after a six-hour debate, Congress granted the Executive Branch legislative powers for a term of 90 days. Voting was done by topic and not by block. On 7 January 2017, at the expiration of the 90-day period, Prime Minister Zavala announced the publication of 112 legislative decrees.

=== Bribery scandal ===
Carlos Moreno served as Presidential Adviser on health issues since the beginning of the government. He was, apparently, a very trustworthy person of Kuczynski. So, when he resigned on 4 October 2016, he caught the attention of the media. Kuczynski said at first that the resignation of his advisor was for personal reasons and his heavy workload. However, Moreno himself explained that the reason was because they had recorded their conversations in the Government Palace and that they were involved in a corruption case.

On 9 October, the television program Cuarto Poder broadcast an audio in which Moreno commented on negotiation for a clinic to sign an agreement with the Archbishopric of Lima and, thus, be able to access an agreement to serve patients insured in the System Integral de Salud (SIS). "It's the negotiation, I have the people who do it, I have the patients," Moreno said, as heard in the audio record. "That is our mine. You do not know how much money we are going to win," he added. Although Moreno was separated from the government as soon as the "negotiation" was exposed, the scandal shook an administration that was barely three months since initiation.

=== Resignation of Minister Mariano Gonzalez ===
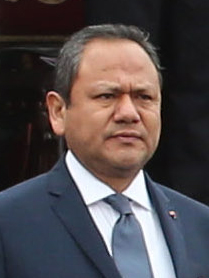
Minister Mariano Gonzalez

On 27 November 2016, a report from a news program revealed that Defense Minister Cosme Mariano González Fernández maintained a sentimental relationship with an advisor from his office, which he presumably had favored with a promotion. The minister denied having favored his partner and said in his defense: "What I have committed is a fact of love. I have fallen in love."

The next day, González submitted his resignation to the position, which was accepted by Prime Minister Zavala. A week later, he was appointed as Jorge Nieto Montesinos, until then head of the Ministry of Culture headed by the actor and film director Salvador del Solar.

=== Censorship of Minister Jaime Saavedra ===
Education minister Jaime Saavedra, who held that position since the Humala administration in 2013, was censored by Congress and forced to resign.

The opposition to the government, represented in the Congress by an overwhelming Fujimorist majority allied with the APRA party, began to question the work of the Minister of Education, Jaime Saavedra.

First, it was related to the organization of the 2019 Panamerican Games in Lima, despite having been announced in 2013 (shortly before taking office as minister), not enough had been done in terms of infrastructure construction.

Then, a Sunday television program launched a report in which he denounced that the minister's trusted staff had made a deviation from a budget of 150 million soles destined for the purchase of computers. The opposition in Congress announced that it would interpellate the minister to demand that he give an account of his administration, particularly in relation to the alleged corruption. President Kuczynski publicly supported his minister and argued that the campaign against him originated with a group of legislators associated with private universities who wanted to make changes in the University Law to favor their interests.

On 7 December 2016, Saavedra was questioned at the Congress, whose campus he voluntarily attended to answer a list of 11 questions. After eleven hours of exhibitions and debate, in which the minister accepted that there were irregularities in the purchases made by his sector by people who had "betrayed his trust", the Fujimorist block announced that it would submit a motion of censure against the minister, because, to his see, he was politically responsible and had not responded satisfactorily to the interpellatory statement. Saavedra told the press that he would not resign before the censorship request.

On 15 December, the minister's censorship debate was held, obtaining as a final result 78 votes in favor, none against and no abstention (due to the fact that the benches of Peruvians for Change and Open Front, against the censorship, they retired of the hemicycle before the voting). Saavedra was given a period of 72 hours to present his resignation letter.

On 17 December, Saavedra resigned and the following day she was sworn in by educator Marilú Martens.

=== Secret bilateral meetings between Pedro Pablo Kuczynski and Keiko Fujimori ===
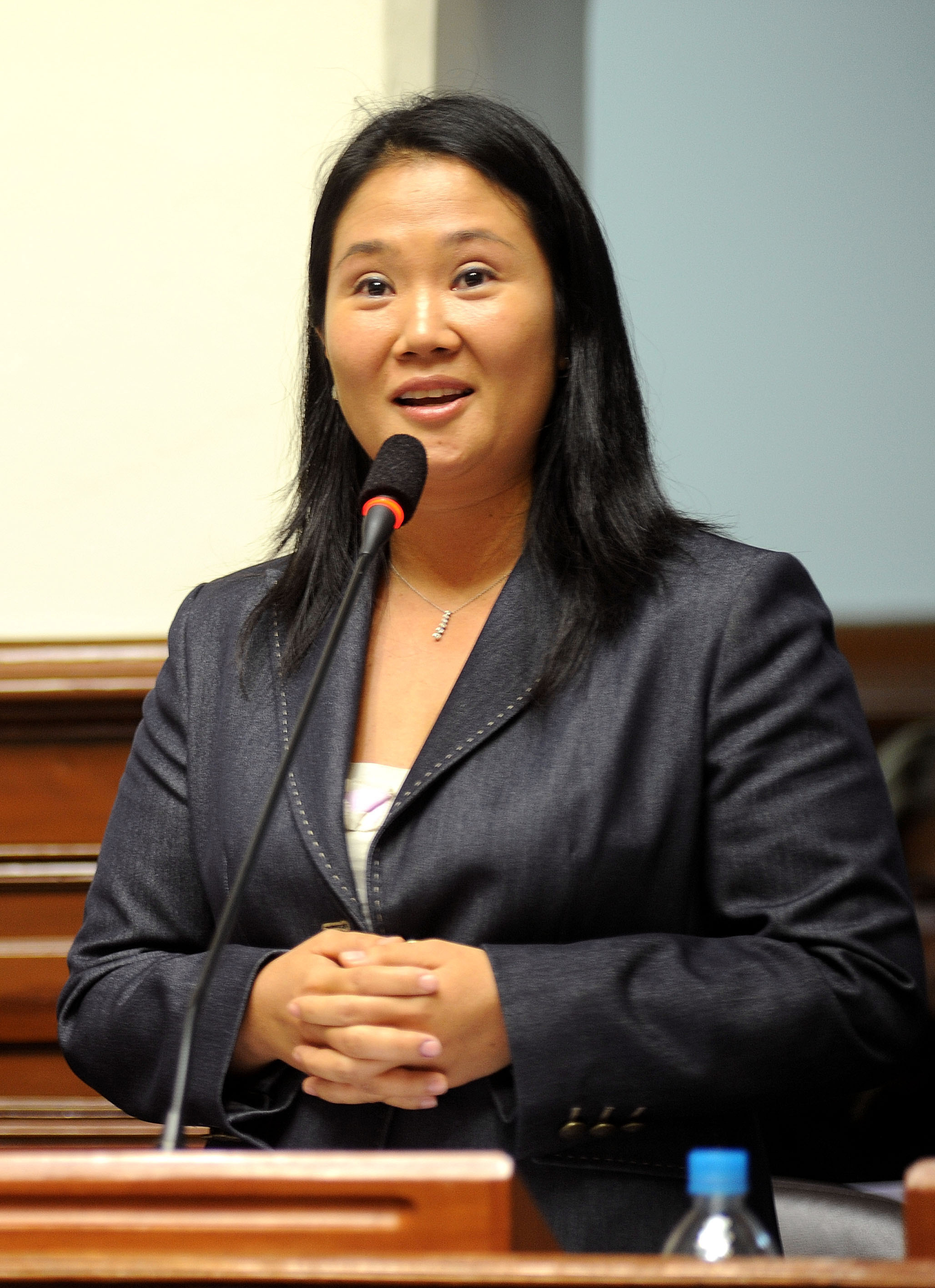
Keiko Fujimori

In December 2016, following an initiative by Cardinal Juan Luis Cipriani, the leader of Popular Force, Keiko Fujimori, and President Kuczynski met to talk at the archbishop's residence. A similar meeting took place in July 2017, after Fujimori invited the president to talk. This time, the meeting took place at the Government Palace. In view of the subsequent events, the second vice president Mercedes Aráoz considered that it was an error to believe in Fujimori's demands for dialogue, since, apparently, since the first moment his intention had been to undermine the government and seek the vacancy of the president.

=== Interpellation of Minister Martin Vizcarra ===
After months of study, the government decided to carry out the project of the construction of the International Airport of Chinchero, signing on 3 February 2017 an addendum to contract modifications with Kuntur Wasi, the consortium had won the award the project in 2014. This was a work that had decades of waiting and was longed for by the people of Cusco, who threatened to get up if it were paralyzed; it seems that the political and social solution prevailed more on the part of the government than on technical issues.

President Kuczynski and the Minister of Transport and Communications Martín Vizcarra defended the addendum, stating that it was the best option for the State and citizens. It was argued that the State saved $590 million (which was the amount of debt that was held with the company).

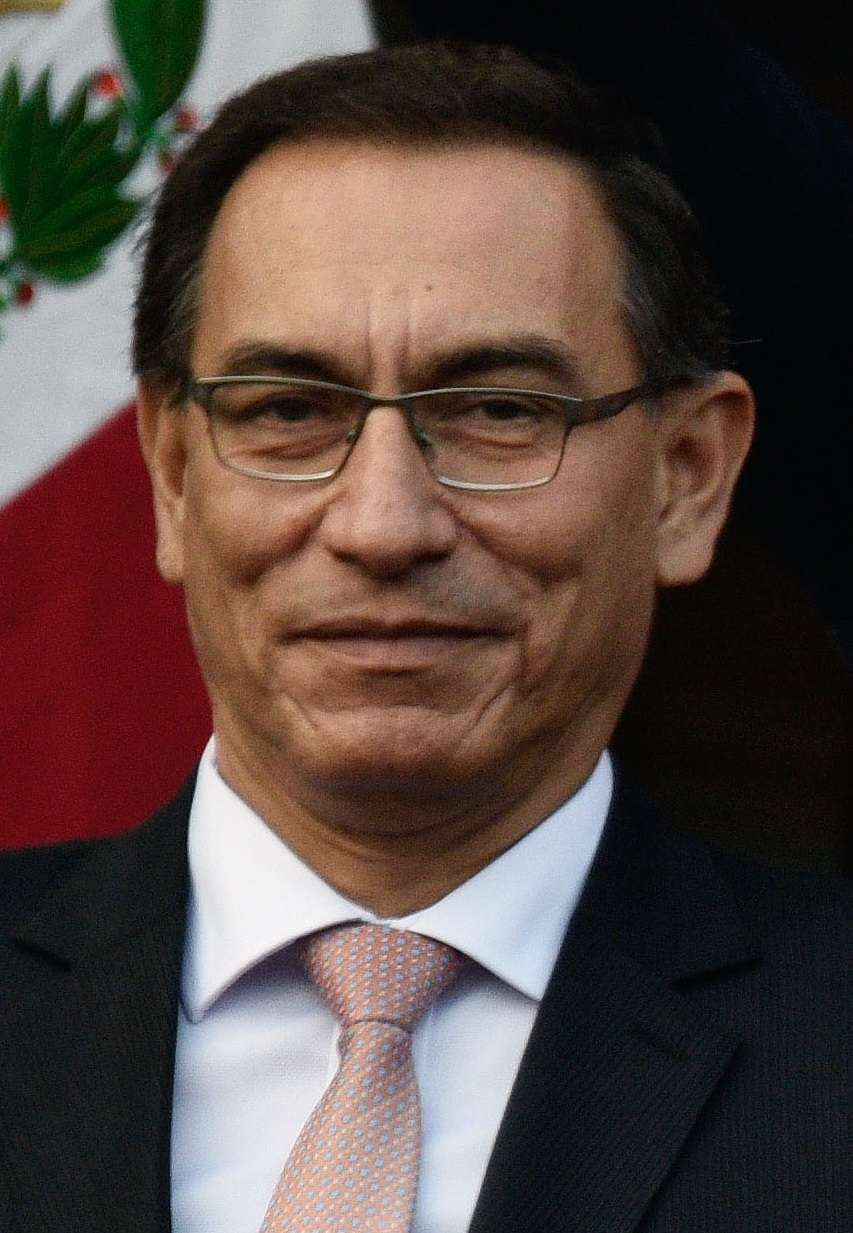
Minister Vizcarra

However, since the Congress, specifically on behalf of Congressman Víctor Andrés García Belaunde, a vehement opposition arose, considering the addendum as harmful to the interests of the State. A photo published in the Correo newspaper, dating from June 2016, showed Vizcarra in a thankful meeting of the Peruanos Por el Kambio party for the contributors to his campaign, where Carlos Vargas Loret de Mola, president of the Kuntur Wasi consortium, appears.

For Garcia Belaunde, that would be the link that would explain the alleged government favoritism toward consortium, so it Vizcarra branded as a "traitor" and demanded his resignation. Harassed by critics, Vizcarra said that the state would no outlay of money to Kuntuhuasi to wait for the final report. On 1 March 2017, Popular Action presented a statement against Vizcarra, seconded by representatives of Popular Force, Frente Amplio and the APRA.

However, following the onslaught of El Nino, in which some parliamentarians moved to the affected areas to care for the victims, Congress decided to suspend "until further notice" the interpellation to Vizcarra, which was scheduled for 23 March and consisted of 83 questions. Amended the El Niño phenomenon, on 5 May, a group of 35 congressmen presented a new motion to question the minister.

On 11 May, the motion was approved with 71 votes and the interpellation was scheduled for 18 May 48 in which the minister answered a list of 83 questions for more than three hours. In the Congress, it was agreed to wait for the report of the Comptroller's Office, indicated for Monday, before proceeding to the vote of censorship.

But before that happened, Vizcarra submitted his resignation as minister, after announcing in a television interview that he was going to cancel the contract and the addendum for the construction of the Chinchero airport, in view of not having had acceptance in the Congress or the Comptroller's Office. Indeed, moments later, the comptroller general Edgar Alarcon presented his report on the contract Chinchero where recommended legal action against ten officials (six of MTC, two of the MEF and two Ositran) for alleged irregularities in the addendum for the company Kuntur Wasi.

With Vizcarra, there were already two ministers who left office by Congress in less than a year, after being questioned (the other was Saavedra in Education); What's more, it was the most prestigious government ministers. For this reason, Zavala criticized the majority caucus in the Congress (of Fujimorism), arguing that "one thing is political control, another is the abuse of power. It is one thing to control, another is to obstruct. "

Succeeding as the First Vice President of Peru and following after Kuczynski's resignation, Vizcarra assumed the Presidency of Peru. Vizcarra has mentioned that he will get his revenge soon.

=== Ministerial changes (May 2017) ===
On 25 May 2017, Bruno Giuffra, who until then was the Minister of Production, left that position and swore as Minister of Transport and Communications, replacing Martín Vizcarra. While the official congressman Pedro Olaechea happened to occupy the Ministry of the Production. The swearing-in ceremony of both was held in the Golden Hall of the Government Palace.

=== Audio Thorne-Alarcón ===
On 28 May 2017 the television program Panorama revealed some transcripts of an audio in which the Minister of Economy Alfredo Thorne was holding a conversation with the Comptroller General of the Republic Edgar Alarcón, dated 17 May, days before the delivery of the report of the Comptroller on the addendum to the Chinchero Airport contract. On 4 June, some excerpts of the audio were published, and later, on the claim that it was being published in a biased manner, it was published in full, on 11 June.

In this conversation, the interlocutors talk about additional funds for the Comptroller's Office that should be approved by the Ministry of Economy, and about the report that the Comptroller was about to draw on the Chinchero Contract. In a part of it we hear that Thorne tells Alarcón: "Now everything depends on you: if Chinchero passes, we are doing well; if Chinchero is taken down, it is going but badly ". After the audio was broadcast, Thorne was accused of exerting political pressure on the comptroller on behalf of the Executive, conditioning the increase in the budget of the Comptroller's Office in exchange for a positive report in what refers to Chinchero.

The plenary session of the Congress, held on 15 June (that is, several days after the announcement of the audio), summoned Thorne to appear urgently in the floor to give his explanations about his conversations with the comptroller. But the minister excused himself from attending his busy work schedule, announcing that he would attend the Congress's oversight committee on 16 June, as scheduled.

Given this, the chairman of the audit committee, Hector Becerril, announced that the summons to the said working group was without effect and that only his immediate presence was expected before the plenary session of the Congress, and that in case of not attending, it could be cause for censorship. Thorne then confirmed his attendance at the Congress on the 16th, where he made an exhibition that lasted ten minutes. He denied the accusation of conditioning the budget increase of the Comptroller's Office in exchange for a positive report on the Chinchero contract, and unless President Kuczynski had instructed him to condition the comptroller. After a debate among the congressmen, the opposition caucuses they raised the minister to renounce his position; otherwise, they would promote a motion of censure against him.

On 19 June, Thorne formalized before Congress a question of confidence to continue in office, something he had requested in his speech on the 16th. The issue of trust was debated on 21 June by the full Congress, where the caucuses of Popular Force, APRA, Acción Popular, Frente Amplio and Alliance for Progress voted against, adding 88 votes in total. There were only 11 votes in favor of giving him the confidence (of the members of the ruling party) and 2 abstentions. Before this, Thorne resigned from the Ministry of Economy, being replaced by Prime Minister Fernando Zavala, who was sworn in the following day, although his role as president of the Council of Ministers.

=== Interpellation of Minister Basombrío ===
On 21 June 2017, Interior Minister Carlos Basombrío Iglesias appeared before the full Congress to answer the interpellatory list of 39 questions. This occurred immediately after Congress denied confidence to Minister Thorne. The exhibition of Basombrío lasted three hours and not only answered the questions, but made announcements about his management. Once the presentation was over, the parliamentary debate began and continued until the following day. Although the opposition groups to the government questioned some of their responses, none raised their censure nor asked for their resignation.

=== Ministerial changes (July 2017) ===
On 27 July 2017, three changes were made official in the ministerial cabinet: the government congresswoman Ana María Choquehuanca assumed the Ministry of Women; Until then Minister of Development and Social Inclusion Cayetana Aljovín became the owner of Energy and Mines; while Fiorella Molinelli was appointed Minister of Development and Social Inclusion. The appointment of the latter generated some criticism from the opposition in Congress, because as an official of the Ministry of Transport and Communications had signed the contract addendum for the construction of the Chinchero airport.

=== Second "Address to the Nation" ===
On 28 July 2017, after one year of the government, it began celebrating the traditional Mass and Te Deum in the Cathedral of Lima; After that, the president arrived at the headquarters of the Congress, where he gave his second message to the nation, for national holidays, which lasted an hour and 15 minutes. According to the Political Constitution, the president on this date must give a message to the nation in which to account for what has been done and present their future plans. Kuczynski began by mentioning the most serious problems he faced during his first year in office, such as the El Niño Costero disaster and the Lava Jato scandal, which cost 2% of GDP. He emphasized that National Reconstruction will boost the national economy. It also presented five bills, which address the obtaining of buildings required for the execution of infrastructure works; the creation of an urban transport authority for Lima and Callao; the reform of the conformation and requirements to be a member of the National Council of the Magistracy; the promotion of projects for wastewater treatment through public-private partnerships; and the strengthening of the labor inspection system through Sunafil. Contrary to the message given at the beginning of his mandate, his second message to the nation was received with little expectation and disbelief among several of the leading political and economic analysts. After the message, Kuczynski walked to the Government Palace, where he was held a tribute to the people who helped during the disaster caused by the coastal El Nino.

=== Interpellation of Minister Martens and the cabinet crisis ===
On 17 August 2017 the congresspeople of Popular Force filed a motion of interpretation against the Minister of Education Marilú Martens who was in negotiations with the representatives of the teachers, in search of the solution to a prolonged teacher strike. On 25 August 2017 the plenary session of the Congress of the Republic approved, with 79 votes in favor, 12 against and 6 abstentions, to make said interpellation. The votes in favor were from the bench of Popular Force, APRA, Frente Amplio and Acción Popular. It was set as the date of the interpellation on 8 September. The minister responded to a list of 40 questions, mainly about the teachers 'strike that still persisted. Martens acknowledged deficiencies in facing the teachers' strike, but assured that his management would not reverse the recognition of meritocracy within the teaching profession.

On 13 September, the Popular Force bench announced that it would submit a motion of censure against the minister, as it considered that it had not responded satisfactorily to the questions of interpellation. Faced with this threat of censorship (which would be the second against an Education minister in less than a year), Prime Minister Fernando Zavala asked Congress for a question of confidence for the full ministerial cabinet; in other words, a renewal of the vote of confidence that had been given to him at the beginning of his administration.

From the Congress this request was criticized, pointing out the fact that Zavala showed solidarity with a minister who was questioned, endangering her entire cabinet, and even more so, when the motion of censure had not yet been made official. It was also said that the "renewal of trust" was something that the Constitution did not contemplate.

But anyway, the Board of Spokespersons of the Congress summoned Zavala at four o'clock on the afternoon of 14 September to support her request for confidence. Zavala presented himself to the plenary session of the Congress with the ministers and presented his request in 12 minutes; his argument focused on the government's intention to defend the educational policy that was intended, according to him, to undermine the education minister's censure. Then came the parliamentary debate. The question of trust was debated for 7 hours and voted on at dawn on the 15th.

There were 77 parliamentarians who voted against Zavala's request, while 22 supported it and 16 abstained. Kenji Fujimori was the only one of the 71 representatives of Popular Force who adhered to the request for trust. All the others opposed. The representatives of the Broad Front also voted against the confidence. Thus the crisis of the cabinet occurred.

Members of Popular Force considered that all the members of the cabinet had to resign, but finally the opinion prevailed that only the prime minister was obliged to resign, and that the rest of the ministers could remain, except those who were questioned, as was the case of Minister Martens.

=== Second cabinet minister (Aráoz) ===
On 17 September 2017, the second vice president and congresswoman Mercedes Aráoz was sworn in as President of the Council of Ministers of Peru and with it joined five new ministers: Claudia Cooper Fort (Economy), Idel Vexler (Education), Enrique Mendoza Ramírez (Justice and Human Rights), Fernando D'Alessio (Health) and Carlos Bruce (Housing). The new head of the cabinet was sworn in with the 18 ministers in a ceremony held in the Court of Honor of the Government Palace.

On 12 October, Mercedes Aráoz appeared before the plenary session of the Congress to request a vote of confidence from her ministerial cabinet. His exhibition lasted two hours. After a parliamentary debate that lasted until one o'clock in the morning of the following day, 83 congressmen (from the opposing blocs of Popular Force, Alianza para el Progreso, Partido Aprista Peruano and Acción Popular, voted in favor of the motion of confidence). as of the official Peruanos Por el Kambio) and against 17 (of Frente Amplio and the nascent New Peru bench). The next step for the Executive will be to request legislative powers from the Congress, set for 7 December 2017.

=== First process to impeach the president ===
On 13 December 2017, Lava Jato Commission President Rosa Bartra released information from the Odebrecht company in which it claimed that Westfield Capital, an investment banking advisory firm, founded and directed by Kuczynski had carried out seven consultancies for Odebrecht between November 2004 and December 2007 for 782,207 million dollars, that is, coinciding with the time when Kuczynski had been Minister of Economy (2004–2005) and President of the Council of Ministers (2005–2006).

The information also revealed that another company, First Capital, constituted by the Chilean Gerardo Sepúlveda (partner of Kuczynski), He had done advisory services for Odebrecht between 2005 and 2013, receiving US$4,043,941 as payment for his services. It was also known that both advisory firms shared the same tax address.

The information was seriously compromising for the president, who had always denied having had relations with the Odebrecht company, and because the payments to his personal consulting company had been made when he was Minister of State (something prohibited by constitutional norm for typifying conflict of interest), and even worse when they came from a company like Odebrecht, which had paid bribes to win the concession of works precisely under the government of Toledo, when Kuczynski had been minister. The president then announced that he would receive the Lava Jato Commission on 22 December, but this gesture was considered delayed, after repeatedly insisting on responding only in writing.

Opposition to the government, led by Popular Force, demanded the resignation of Kuczynski. and threatened to kick him out of the presidency if he did not. Frente Amplio, on the other hand, stated that the vacancy should proceed directly. At midnight on 14 December, he denied the accusations and said he would not resign his position. "I am here to tell you: I am not going to abdicate to my honor or my values or my responsibilities as president of all Peruvians," he said in a message to the nation.

In his defense, he assured that he had no relationship with the company. First Capital, which was the exclusive property of Sepúlveda, and that only one of the payments mentioned had to do with him, the one dated in 2012, when he was no longer Minister of State; and that regarding Westfield Capital, although he recognized that it was his sole proprietorship, he affirmed that he was never under his direction and administration while he was Minister of State, and that the contracts dated at that time had been signed by Sepúlveda, his partner. He also pointed out that all payments to his company were legal, duly registered, billed and banked.

Kuczynski's explanations did not convince the opposition, and he was accused of continuing to lie, especially in relation to the fact that he had left Westfield. Capital when he was minister, when, according to public records, he always figured as the director of that company. In this regard, Kuczynski argued in its defense the concept of the "Chinese wall", expression used in business to refer to when the partner or owner has no contact or receive information about the management of the company. But this argument did not convince its opponents either, since being a sole proprietorship, there was no way that it would have remained alien to the management of it. Faced with the refusal of the president to resign, several of the opposition caucuses of the Congress then proposed to submit their position to the vacancy. The Frente Amplio filed a motion to request the vacancy to be debated in the plenary session of the Congress. The congresspersons of Popular Force, Apra and Alianza para el Progreso joined the request and thus exceeded the 26 signatures needed to proceed with the process. Once the motion was approved, the debate began at 4 and 38 in the afternoon of 15 December and lasted until the night.

The opposition legislators who introduced the motion cited a moral inability to denounce that the president lied in the statements he gave on his ties with the Brazilian company. On the other hand, the congressmen demanded that due process be followed, reproaching the fact that the opposition proceeded with unusual speed and that several of its members had already decided to vote the president without having heard his defense. They also questioned the fact that a single report from Odebrecht was considered sufficient evidence, which would openly disregard the investigation that demanded such a delicate and far-reaching case.

According to the regulations, the vacancy request was required to be accepted for acceptance. vote of 40% of able congressmen. As 118 congressmen were present, only 48 votes were needed, which was widely exceeded, as they voted 93 in favor and 17 against; the latter were, for the most part, those of the ruling party caucus.

Once the vacancy request was approved, Congress agreed that on Thursday, 21 December, at 9 o'clock in the morning, Kuczynski should present itself, with or without its lawyer, the plenary session of the Congress to make his discharges, giving him all the necessary time; then it would proceed to debate and finally vote to decide the presidential vacancy, needed for this 87 votes of the total of 130 congressmen.

On the day, Kuczynski went to Congress to exercise their defense, accompanied by his lawyer Alberto Borea Odría. The defense began with the speech of the president himself, who reiterated in denying that he had committed any act of corruption. Then came the defense of Borea, described as brilliant, which was at the core of his argument that the request for vacancy was an exaggeration because you could not accuse a president of the Republic without demonstrating evidence of his "permanent moral incapacity." It considered that the imputed crimes had to ventilate first in the investigating commission, before drawing hasty conclusions. He also rejected that Kuczynski has repeatedly lied about his relationship with Odebrecht, since the events in question had occurred 12 years ago and he did not have to keep them in mind.

Once Borea's address was over, the congressional debate began, which lasted fourteen hours. Voting for the vacancy took place after eleven o'clock at night, with the following result: 78 votes in favor, 19 against and 21 abstentions. One of the benches, the one of New Peru, retired before the voting, adducing that they would not be lent to the game raised by the fujimoristas. Since 87 votes were needed to proceed with the vacancy, it was dismissed. The entire People's Power caucus voted in favor of the vacancy, with the exception of 10 of its members, headed by Kenji Fujimori, who abstained, and who thus decided the result. The rumor spread that this dissident group had negotiated its votes with the government in exchange for the presidential pardon in favor of Alberto Fujimori, its historical leader imprisoned for ten years.

=== The Fujimorist majority opposition ===
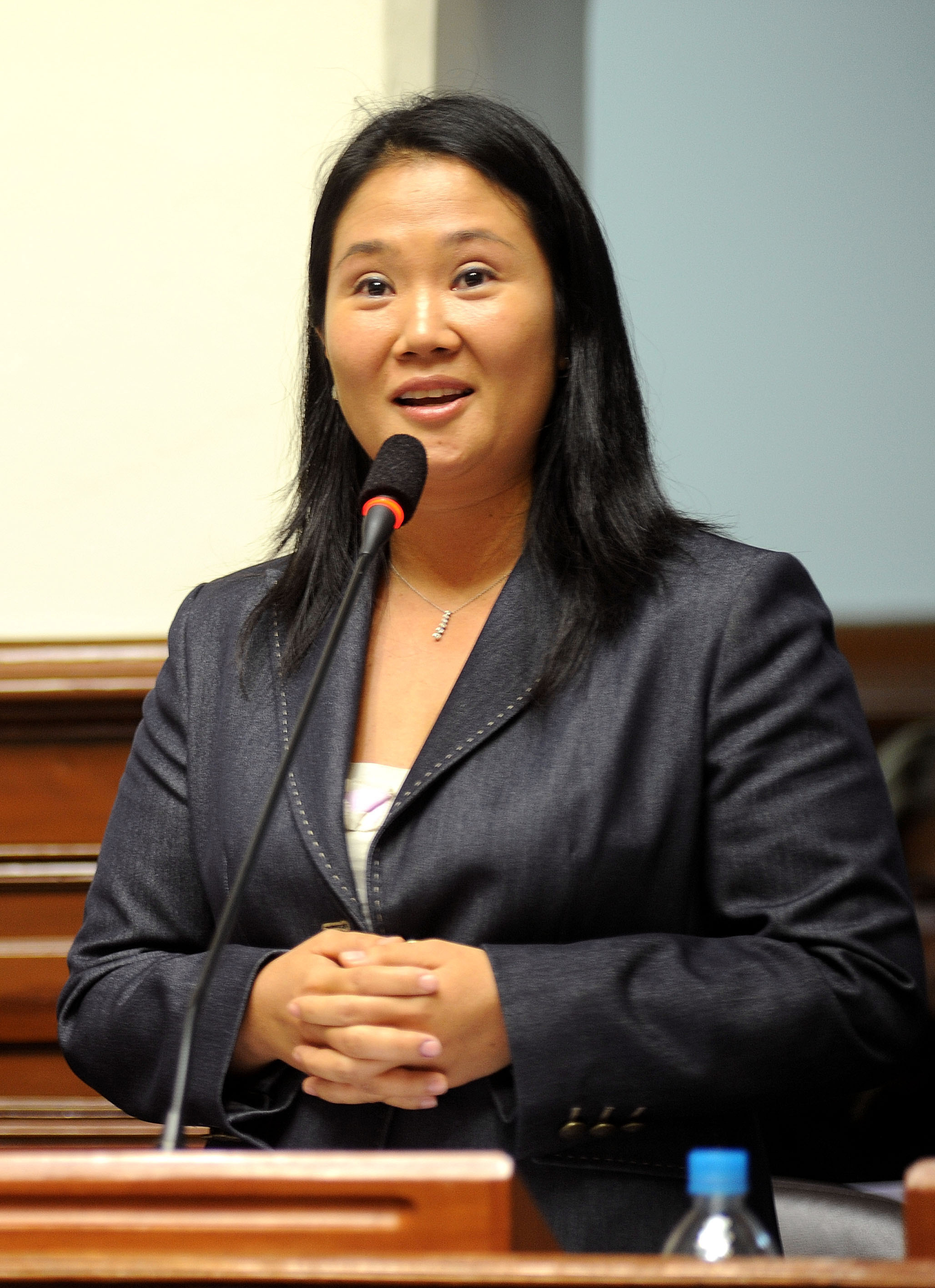
Keiko Fujimori, former leader of the majority opposition faction Popular Force.

The governance crisis was originated by the existence of a majority opposition caucus in Congress, which continuously confronts a weakened Executive Power, which it accuses of ineffectiveness to solve the country's problems. Until September 2017, that is to say, in one year and two months of government, Fujimorism had led to the fall of five ministers. Several analysts considered that what Fujimorism was looking for was to bring down the country's institutions and control the Public Prosecutor's Office. Constitutional Court and the Presidency of the Republic. All this would point to shield its leader Keiko Fujimori, seriously involved in the Odebrecht case.

- Against the Public Ministry: Fujimorism, through its congressman Daniel Salaverry, made a constitutional accusation against the prosecutor of the Nation Pablo Sanchez, because supposedly not He had initiated investigations against several Peruvian companies that were members of Odebrecht. To which was added another constitutional complaint against the same prosecutor raised by Yeni Vilcatoma, a former member of the Fujimorist caucus, who questioned her functional responsibility for issuing a resolution which provided that any new complaint for organized crime and money laundering be remitted only to the office of prosecutor Hamilton Castro, responsible for the Odebrecht case.
- Against the Constitutional Court (TC): From the Subcommission of Constitutional Accusations of Congress, Fujimorism, allied with the aprismo, approved to recommend to the full of the Congre or the dismissal and disqualification for 10 years of Judge Eloy Espinosa-Saldaña and the suspension for 30 days to three other judges: Manuel Miranda, Marianella Ledesma and Carlos Ramos, all of them accused by eleven retired sailors of having violated the constitutional precept of the "immutability of res judicata" by issuing a resolution in which they rendered null and void the statement of a sentence of 2013, in which it was said that the El Frontón massacre of 1986 was not a crime against humanity. The members of the TC went to the Inter-American Court of Human Rights to denounce what they considered a threat to the independence of their functions by the Peruvian Congress. That court gave the reason to the magistrates and asked Congress to file the accusation.
- Against His Excellency, the President: The revelations that Odebrecht had made payments for consultancies to the Kuczynski sole proprietorship when he was Minister of State, would have been made in search of the presidential vacancy, that although it was not achieved during the vote in the Congress of 21 December 2017, Fujimorism spokesmen warned that they would seek more evidence to commit the president in the Odebrecht case to raise another vacancy motion (as, indeed, they did). Also the leftists of Frente Amplio and Nuevo Peru pointed to the same, although adding another motivation for the vacancy, referred to the humanitarian pardon to Alberto Fujimori, which they considered illegal.

=== Pardon of Former President Alberto Fujimori ===
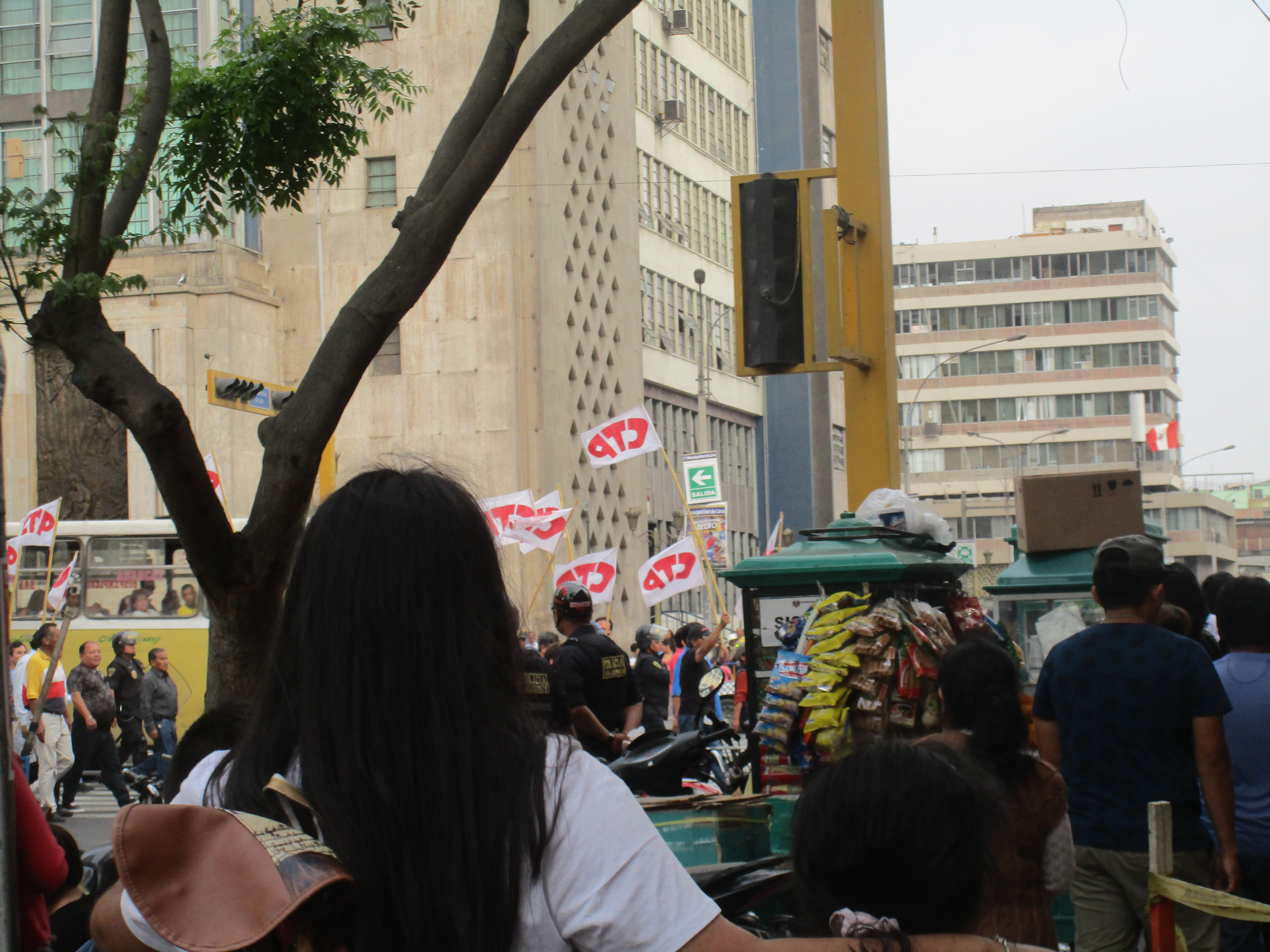
Protests against the pardon of former President Alberto Fujimori, imprisoned for corruption and multiple cases of human rights abuses.

On 24 December 2017, the president granted a humanitarian pardon to Alberto Fujimori, who had been imprisoned for 12 years, with a sentence of 25 years for crimes of human rights violations (La Cantuta and Barrios Altos cases). Kuczynski called on young people not to be carried away by hatred and turn the page, to lead the country towards "a fraternal Bicentennial of peace and prosperity." The government assured that the pardon had been decided for purely humanitarian reasons, in view of the various physical ills afflicting the former president of the Republic, confirmed by reports of a medical board.

However, a strong suspicion arose that the pardon would have been the result of a furtive pact of the Kuczynski government with the sector of the Fujimorist bloc that had abstained during the vote for the presidential vacancy and that in that way had prevented it from concrete this. The pardon also motivated the resignation of the official congressmen Alberto de Belaunde, Vicente Zeballos and Gino Costa; of the Minister of Culture Salvador del Solar and of the Minister of Defense Jorge Nieto Montesinos; as well as the accomplishment of diverse marches in Lima and the interior of the country in protest against the pardon.

Since the beginning of the crisis, Minister Carlos Basombrío had also presented his resignation, which was accepted by Kuczynski on 27 December 2017, being replaced by retired Police General Vicente Romero Fernández.

The writer Mario Vargas Llosa considered the pardon as a "betrayal" of Kuczynski to the democratic electorate that had elected him in rejection of autocratic Fujimori. Fujimori, who days before the pardon had been admitted to a clinic for complications in his health, was discharged on 4 January 2018 and thus could, for the first time, move freely.

Kuczynski also announced its desire to form a new ministerial cabinet, which he called "the Cabinet of Reconciliation", which according to him, should mark a new stage in the relationship between the Executive and the Legislative.

=== The Cabinet of Reconciliation (Aráoz, second phase) ===
President Kuczynski and his "Cabinet of Reconciliation", in the official photo after the swearing-in ceremony.

On 9 January 2018, the president swore to his cabinet that he called the "Cabinet of Reconciliation." Mercedes Aráoz was presided over and eight ministerial changes were made, the most important renewal so far in the government. Cayetana Aljovín, who held the portfolio of Energy and Mines, went on to Foreign Affairs. The new ministers who were sworn in were: Jorge Kisic (Defense), José Arista Arbildo (Agriculture), Lieneke Schol (Production), Jorge Meléndez Celis (Development and Social Inclusion), Ángela Grossheim (Energy and Mines), Abel Salinas Rivas ( Health), Javier Barreda (Work) and Alejandro Neyra (Culture). The ceremony was held in the Great Hall of Government Palace.

Two of the new ministers (Barreda and Salinas) were apristas militants, being expelled from their party when knowing that they would integrate the cabinet, to demarcate like this any collaboration with the government. Meléndez is an official congressman, representing Loreto. Kisic is a retired general of the FAP. Neyra is a diplomat, writer and former director of the National Library. The other ministers are linked to the business sector. Kuczynski has also highlighted that it is a cabinet that represents the diversity of Peru and that it will seek reconciliation with dialogue.

=== Internal faction disputes in Popular Force ===
On 30 January 2018, the disciplinary committee of Popular Force advised to expel Congressmen Kenji Fujimori, Bienvenido Ramírez and Maritza García from their parliamentary caucus, the same ones who, along with six other congressmen, had abstained from voting in favor of the Presidential vacancy. The next day Kenji Fujimori and the 9 parliamentarians in question agreed to present their irrevocable resignation to their caucus, thus giving themselves the most important schism within Fujimorism since their appearance on the political scene. Kenji Fujimori justified this decision by citing the repeated abuses that he had been receiving from the People's Power leadership only because he had opted for the country's governability and reconciliation; when asked if he would form a new caucus, he said he would wait for the Court's ruling on the unconstitutionality suit filed against the law that prohibits the formation of new parliamentary groups in Congress.

On 1 March 2018, Kenji Fujimori announced his departure from Popular Force, following the revelation that the Odebrecht company had contributed one million two hundred thousand dollars to the party for the 2011 electoral campaign.

=== Second process to impeach the president ===
In January 2018, the Frente Amplio caucus put forward a new request for a presidential vacancy, with the cause of the pardon to Alberto Fujimori, which allegedly had been negotiated and granted illegally. This did not prosper, given the lack of support from Popular Force, whose votes were necessary to carry out such an initiative. Under that experience, the leftist groups of Frente Amplio and Nuevo Peru promoted another vacancy motion, concentrating exclusively on the Odebrecht case, arguing that new indications of corruption and conflict of interest had been discovered by Kuczynski when he was Minister of State in the Government of Toledo. This time they won the support of Popular Force, as well as other groups like the Alliance for Progress, thus gathering the 27 minimum votes needed to present a multiparty motion before the Congress of the Republic, which was held on 8 March 2018.

On 15 March, the admission of this motion was debated in the plenary session of the Congress, with the result being 87 votes in favor, 15 votes against and 15 abstentions. The motion received the backing of all the parties, except for Peruvians for the Kambio and non-grouped congressmen, among them, the three ex-oficialistas and the Kenji Fujimori bloc. The Board of Spokespersons scheduled the debate on the presidential vacancy request for Thursday, 22 March.

A confidential report from the Financial Intelligence Unit (FIU) sent to the Public Ministry and the Lava Jato Commission of Congress was leaked to public knowledge. This 33-page document revealed that from the companies and consortiums linked to the Odebrecht Group, transfers had been made to Westfield Capital, the sole proprietorship of Kuczynski, for $1,893,841, that is, one million more than what was known up to the moment. The leak of this report, which is presumed to have been made by the Lava Jato Commission chaired by Rosa Bartra, would have been intended to further dent the credibility of the President of the Republic, although it added little to what was already known. But the deadly blow to Kuczynski came a few days later.

=== "Kenjivideos" scandal ===
On 20 March 2018, the Popular Force bench showed evidence that the government was buying the support of congressmen to vote against the presidential vacancy, a rumor that had already circulated during the first process. It was a set of videos showing the conversations that legislators Bienvenido Ramírez and Guillermo Bocángel (from the bench of Kenji Fujimori) had made to try to convince congressman Moisés Mamani (from Puno) not to join in supporting the presidential vacancy. In one of the videos, Kenji Fujimori is seen in a meeting with Mamani, which also includes Bienvenido Ramírez. The latter makes a series of offers to the parliamentarian from Pune to enable him to streamline projects and projects for his region, in exchange for joining his group and supporting Kuczynski. In another video you see Bocángel talking about the administrative control of the Congress, once they access the Board. And in a third video, you see Alberto Borea Odría, Kuczynski's lawyer on the subject of vacancy, explaining to Mamani about aspects of that process and giving him the telephone number of a minister of state.

A few hours later, the Fujimoristas gave the final thrust, by broadcasting a set of audios, in which the Minister of Transport and Communications, Bruno Giuffra is heard offering works to Mamani in exchange for his vote to avoid the vacancy. The press highlighted a phrase from Giuffra in which he says: "Compadre, you know what the nut is and what you are going to get out", presumably referring to the benefits Mamani would get if he voted against the vacancy.

=== Resignation of President Kuczynski ===
Main article: Resignation of Pedro Pablo Kuczynski

The revelation of those videos and audios caused much commotion in the political environment. Until then, it was expected that the vote to achieve the vacancy would be very tight and that even Kuczynski could again succeed as had happened in the first process. But the kenjivideos determined that several congressmen who until then had manifested their abstention (among them the three ex- oficialistas) they folded in favor of the vacancy, and thus they made it known openly. Faced with the foreseeable scenario that awaited him in the debate scheduled for the Congress on the 22nd, Kuczynski opted to renounce the Presidency of the Republic, sending the respective letter to Congress, and giving a message to the Nation transmitted at two forty in the morning. afternoon of 21 March 2018.

"I believe that the best thing for the country is for me to resign from the Presidency of the Republic. I wish not to be an obstacle for our nation's efforts to find the path of unity and harmony that is so critically needed and has been denied to me. I do not want the country or my family to continue suffering with the uncertainty of recent times (...) There will be a constitutionally ordered transition."

- Kuczynski, in his message of resignation to the Presidency of the Republic. Lima, March 21, 2018.

The Board of Spokespersons of the Congress, although rejected the terms of the letter of resignation of Kuczynski, which considered nothing self-critical, accepted the same and scheduled for 22 March, from four in the afternoon, a debate in Congress to evaluate the resignation, the same one that continued the next day. Although a section of congressmen on the left argued that Kuczynski's resignation should not be accepted and that Congress should proceed to vacancy due to moral incapacity, the majority of congressmen considered that they should accept to close the page at once. When the preliminary text of the resolution of the Congress in which Kuczynski was pointed out to him as a "traitor to the fatherland" became public, he announced that he would withdraw his letter of resignation if that qualification was maintained. The Board of Spokesmen decided then to omit that expression. The resignation was accepted with 105 votes in favor, 12 against and 3 abstentions. Moments later, Martín Vizcarra, newly arrived from Canada, was sworn in as the new constitutional president of the Republic.

== The Odebrecht case ==
On 21 December 2016, a document was published by the US Department of Justice that revealed that Brazilian construction company Odebrecht had paid bribes to public officials in 12 countries (including Peru) to win public works tenders. It would be the biggest corruption scandal in Latin America.

In the case of Peru, according to judicial investigators, Odebrecht would have paid approximately 29 million dollars in bribes to officials, which generated more than 143 million dollars in benefits, although it is likely that the amount of bribes and bribes been much older. This would have occurred between 2005 and 2014, corresponding to the governments of Alejandro Toledo (2001–2006), Alan García (2006–2011) and Ollanta Humala (2011–2016). Since November 2016, the Prosecutor's Office in Peru had been investigating the case known from Brazil as Operation Lava Jato.

Upon hearing the news, President Kuczynski said he would support everything necessary for the investigation. He denied being involved in the corruption scandal when he was prime minister of the Toledo government.

=== Statements by Jorge Barata and Marcelo Odebrecht ===
Marcelo Odebrecht (former president of the construction company) and Jorge Barata (executive director of the company in Peru), welcomed the award-winning or effective collaboration to reduce their sentences and are collaborating with the justice of Brazil and Peru. The declarations of these characters have compromised Peruvian presidents and officials, about the receipt of bribes to favor the Brazilian company in the bidding for public works, as well as "ghost" contributions to finance the electoral campaigns of various candidates (the latter would come to configure the criminal figure of money laundering).

Marcelo Odebrecht answered the questions of the Peruvian prosecutors in May and November 2017, about the contribution of three million dollars that he made for the election campaign of Ollanta Humala in 2011, as well as about his annotations in his agenda, where he mentioned some politicians like Keiko Fujimori.

Barata, in his first declarations, revealed the delivery of 20 million dollars as a bribe to President Alejandro Toledo for the South Interoceanic Highway. Then, before a team of Peruvian prosecutors, on 27 and 28 February 2018, he answered several questions, revealing the contributions made by the Odebrecht company to the presidential candidacies of 2011 (Humala, Keiko, Kuczynski), detailing the amounts and intermediaries.

=== Main stakeholders ===
The most resounding case is that of former President Alejandro Toledo, who would have received 20 million dollars, delivered by Barata, in exchange for the concession of sections II and III of the South Interoceanic Highway. The capture of Toledo was ordered, who is currently fugitive in the United States. He was opened an extradition booklet, sustained by influence peddling, collusion and money laundering to the detriment of the State. On 15 March 2018, the Supreme Court declared the request for extradition admissible, which was approved by the Executive Power, through the Council of Ministers.

Another accusation was the payment of bribes in the tender for Line 1 of the Lima Metro, which occurred under García's second government, when Enrique Cornejo was Minister of Transport and Communications. They were accused Jorge Cuba, former deputy communications minister; Miguel Navarro, former official of the Vice Ministry of Communications; and Mariella Huerta, former director of the bidding committee of the Lima Metro; Edwin Luyo, member of the same committee. Cuba, Navarro and Luyo were captured and imprisoned, while Huerta is fugitive. The former volleyball player Jéssica Tejada, a couple from Cuba, was also arrested for having lent her name to one of the offshore accounts where the bribe money was deposited.

The revelations of other former Odebrecht officials also involved two regional governors: Félix Moreno Caballero (Callao) and Jorge Acurio Tito (Cuzco). Moreno has been related to receiving a bribe of 4.2 million dollars for the concession to the Brazilian company of a section of the Costa Verde, for which he was given preventive detention. Acurio is accused of having agreed to a 3 million dollar bribe to favor the Brazilian company with the work Via de Evitamiento in Cuzco. The Office of the Prosecutor issued 18 months of preventive detention. In relation to this case, the lawyer José Zaragozá, syndicated as an intermediary in the payments, has also been arrested, who accepted the award. Both Acurio and Moreno appealed the mandate of preventive detention. The Appeals Chamber confirmed the preventive detention of Acurio, but revoked the one of Moreno, who happened to face the process in restricted appearance (7 June 2017).

Among those involved in the scandal is the former president Ollanta Humala and his wife Nadine Heredia, because Barata said he had given the latter three million dollars, at the request of the Brazilian Workers Party, political affinity to the Nationalist Party of Humala. That amount would have been destined for the electoral campaign of 2011, in which Humala was elected president. On 13 July 2017, the First Preparatory Investigation Court, headed by Judge Richard Concepción Carhuancho, approved the request for 18 months of preventive detention against Humala and his wife, presented by the money laundering office, which alleged risk of escape or asylum claim. The next day, Humala was interned in the Diroes prison (Ate), and Nadine Heredia went to the Virgen de Fátima prison, attached to the women's prison of Chorrillos.

In investigations is the ex-president Alan García, whose initials of his name appear on the agenda of Marcelo Odebrecht, as revealed by a journalistic publication. In its statements to Peruvian prosecutors in November 2017, Odebrecht confirmed that these acronyms of AG correspond to Alan García, although without linking it to any bribe payment.

In November 2017, the former mayor of Lima Susana Villarán, who was already in the process of investigation, was directly related to the case by the Brazilian consultant Valdemir Garreta, an aspiring collaborator, who told the Peruvian prosecutor's office that the Odebrecht companies and OAS financed the campaign for the No to the revocation in 2013 for an amount of three million dollars, and that in that transaction served as an intermediary municipal official José Miguel Castro, right arm of the then mayor of Lima. All that revelation has been confirmed by Jorge Barata himself. Although, in the opinion of some, Villarán would be given preventive detention, he was only prevented from leaving the country for eight months.

=== The Kuczynski investigation ===
President Kuczynski was also included in the investigation of the Lava Jato case, for having been prime minister under the Toledo government (when the interoceanic highway was awarded to the Odebrecht company) and for the alleged financing he received from the government. The same company in its campaign for the 2011 and 2016 presidencies. In this regard, Kuczynski sent in October 2017 an official letter to the Lava Jato commission of the Congress in which it explained the matters on which it could be consulted, and that it would respond in writing.

Kuczynski's refusal to receive the Commission in person (up to six times), was due to the fact that, according to his version, when in February 2017 he received the Supervisory Commission (chaired by Héctor Becerril), he had received a series of abuse. However, the Fujimorista bloc demanded that the explanations be given in person and even pushed for a bill so that a president of the Republic is obliged to appear before congressional commissions, which, according to constitutional experts, has no support in the Constitution.

In November 2017, it transpired that Marcelo Odebrecht would have revealed some advice that Kuczynski provided to his company. Although Kuczynski flatly denied having had a working relationship with the Odebrecht company, Congress was once again required to receive the Lava Jato Commission in person.

In December 2017, the president of the Lava Jato Commission, Rosa Bartra, insisted that Kuczynski respond in person before the commission, giving it as a sort of ultimatum. Given the repeated response of Kuczynski that only respond in writing, Bartra made the disclosure of payments that the Odebrecht company had made between 2005 and 2006 to the consulting companies Westfield Capital and First Capital, linked to President Kuczynski, then Minister of State. However, none of these payments were bribes, but that they were all legal; What was questioned was that Kuczynski received them through his sole proprietorship (Westfield Capital) as a Minister of State, something constitutionally forbidden. Pushed by the revelations, Kuczynski agreed to have received a consulting payment for the H2 Olmos project, from the same Brazilian company. This only increased political tension due to its supposed contradictions.

Crisis came about because of the presidential vacancy that Kuczynski was able to overcome, at first, in December 2017. Then, when a second vacancy request was submitted, in March 2018, he had to resign from the presidency shortly before the vote in Congress, due to the scandal of the kenjivideo (see more details in the Political section).

Days before his resignation from the presidency, Kuczynski finally received the Lava Jato Commission on 16 March 2018, where he responded to a seven-hour interrogation. In addition to the matter of contractual relations between his consulting firms and the companies of the Odebrecht group, he was questioned about the financing of his 2011 election campaign, when he applied for the group Alianza por el Gran Cambio.

No sooner did Kuczynski resign as president, when he was prevented from leaving the country and the raid of his two homes was ordered (one in San Isidro, and the other in Cieneguilla).

=== The Keiko Fujimori case and Popular Force ===
Already before the outbreak of the Odebrecht scandal, Keiko Fujimori and his Popular Force party were in the investigation because of the financing of their electoral campaign. A judicial process was opened to Keiko Fujimori, for alleged money laundering. The matter was further complicated for the former presidential candidate when it was revealed that in the agenda of Marcelo Odebrecht's cell phone, there was a very compromising phrase: "Increase Keiko for 500 e eu fazer visita". It was said that the figure referred to five hundred thousand dollars and that it was a contribution for his electoral campaign of 2011.

In November 2017, a team of Peruvian prosecutors questioned Marcelo Odebrecht in the city of Curitiba, about the case of Keiko Fujimori. The businessman confirmed that he had contributed to Keiko's presidential campaigns, although he explained that it was Barata who knew the exact amounts.

In February 2018, Barata revealed that she had contributed one million two hundred thousand dollars in favor of Keiko's electoral campaign in 2011, and that the intermediaries of that delivery had been Jaime Yoshiyama, Augusto Bedoya and Ricardo Briceño, the latter's representative of the CONFIEP.

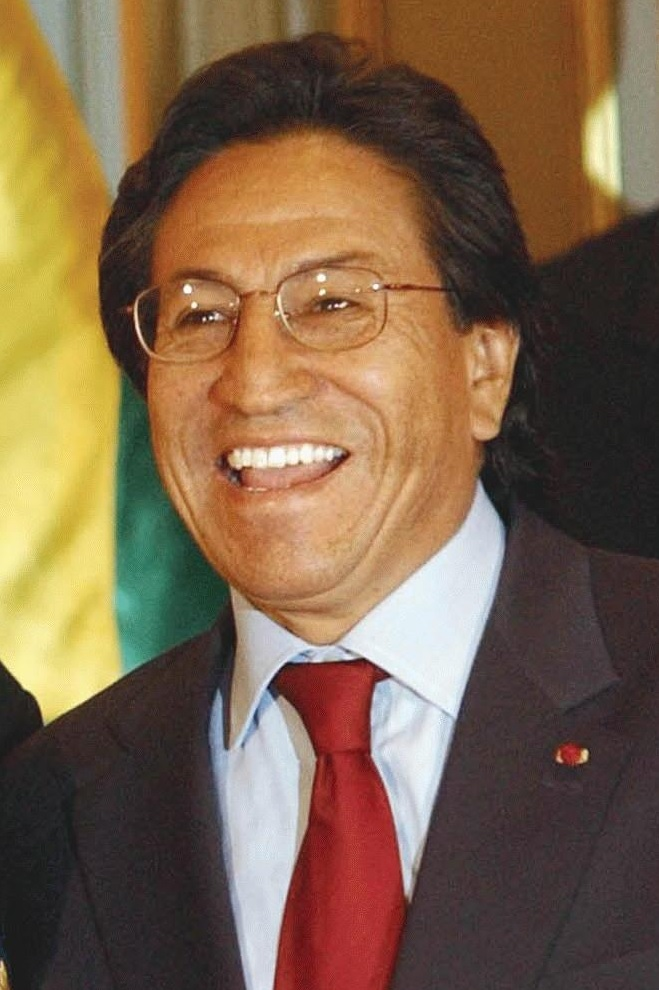
Alejandro Toledo Manrique
President of Peru
Extradited

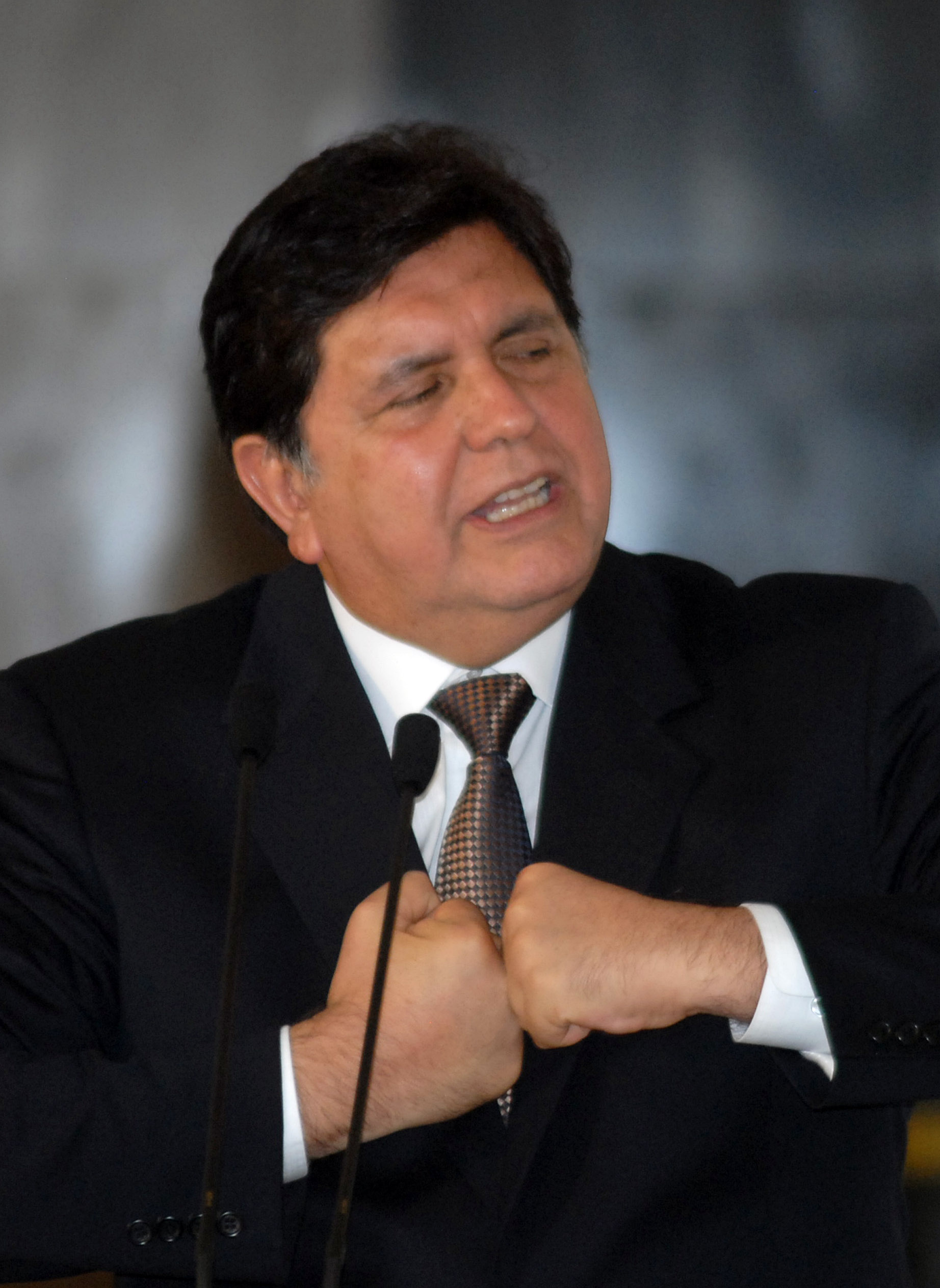
Alan García Pérez (d. 2019)
President of Peru
Under investigation

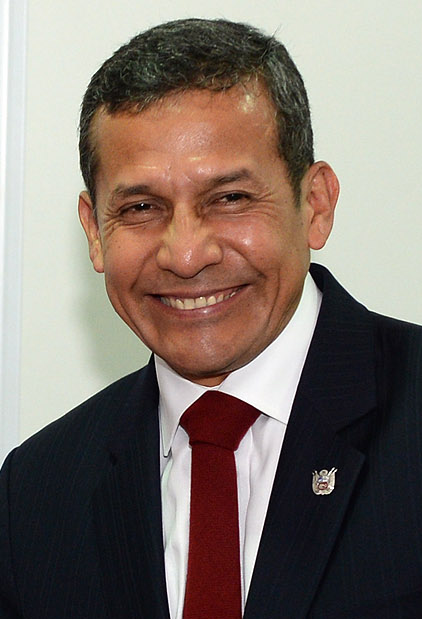
Ollanta Humala Tasso
President of Peru
Convicted

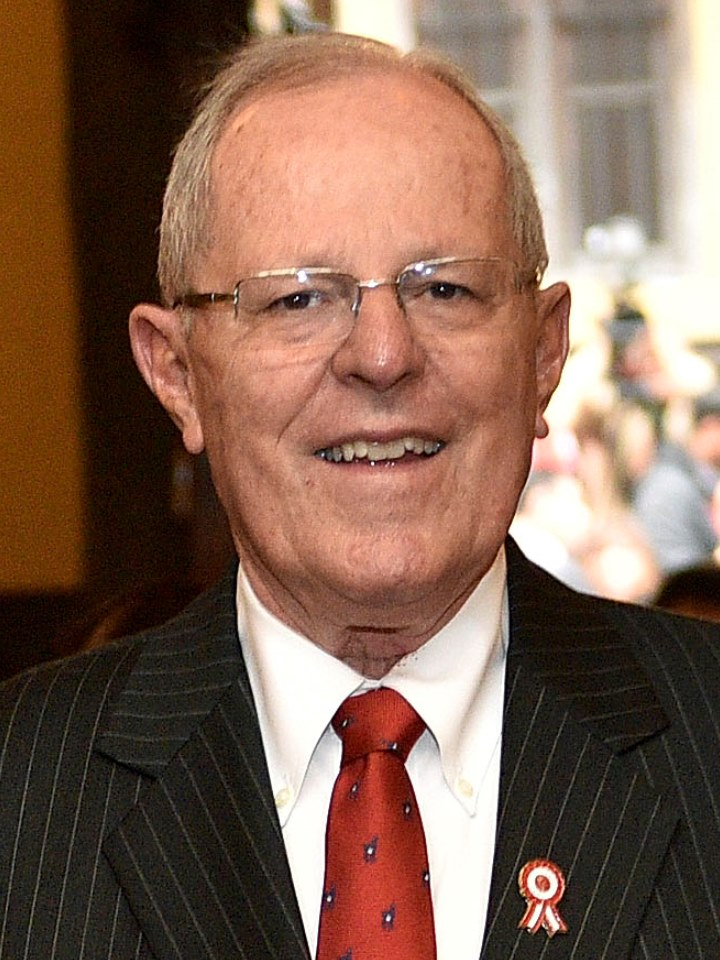
Pedro Pablo Kuczynski Godard
President of Peru
Under investigation

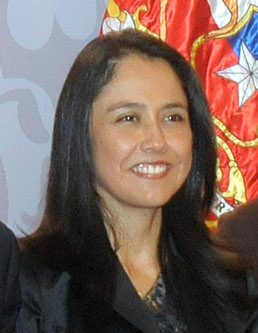
Nadine Heredia Alarcón
First Lady of Peru Convicted

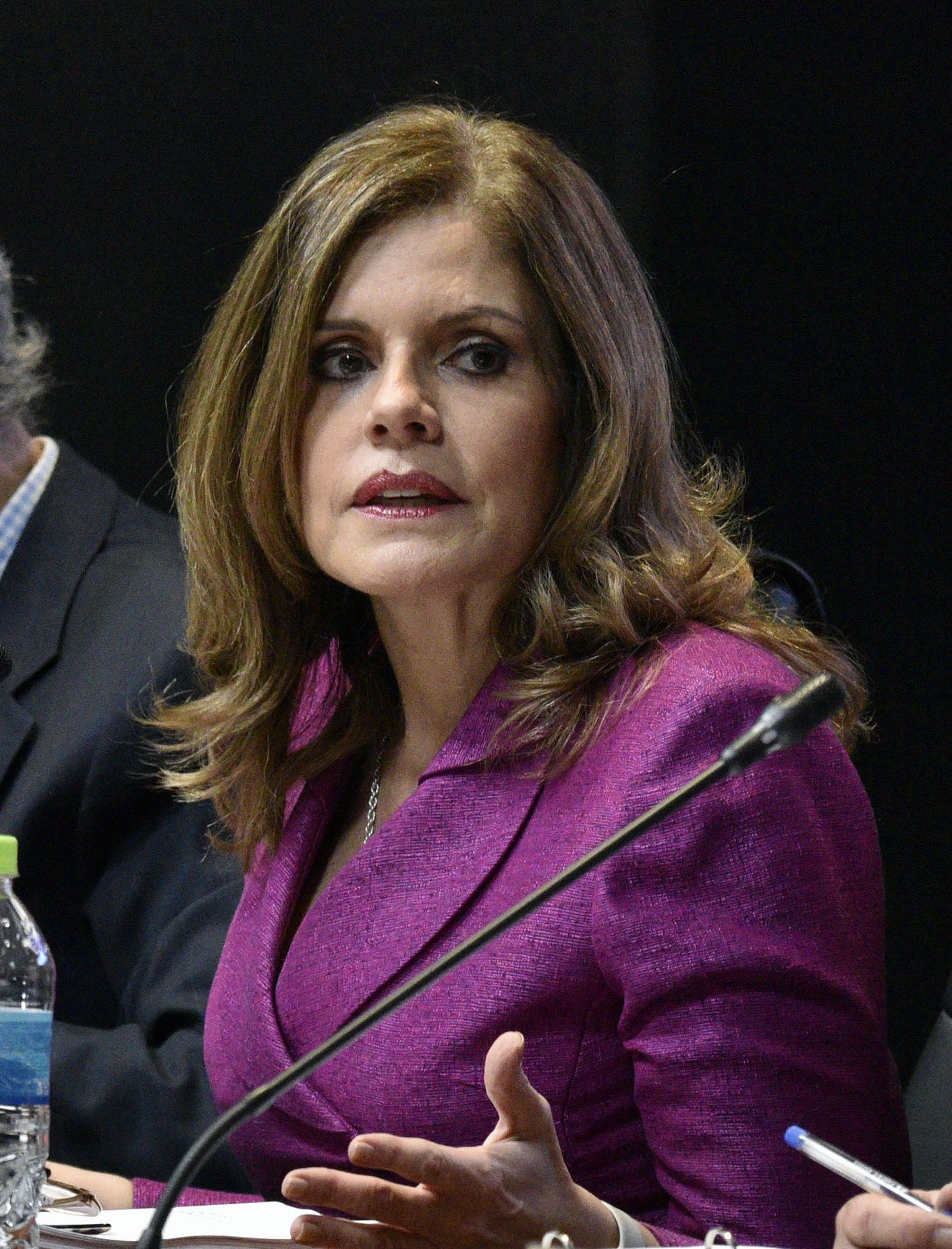
Mercedes Aráoz Fernández
Vice President of Peru
Under investigation

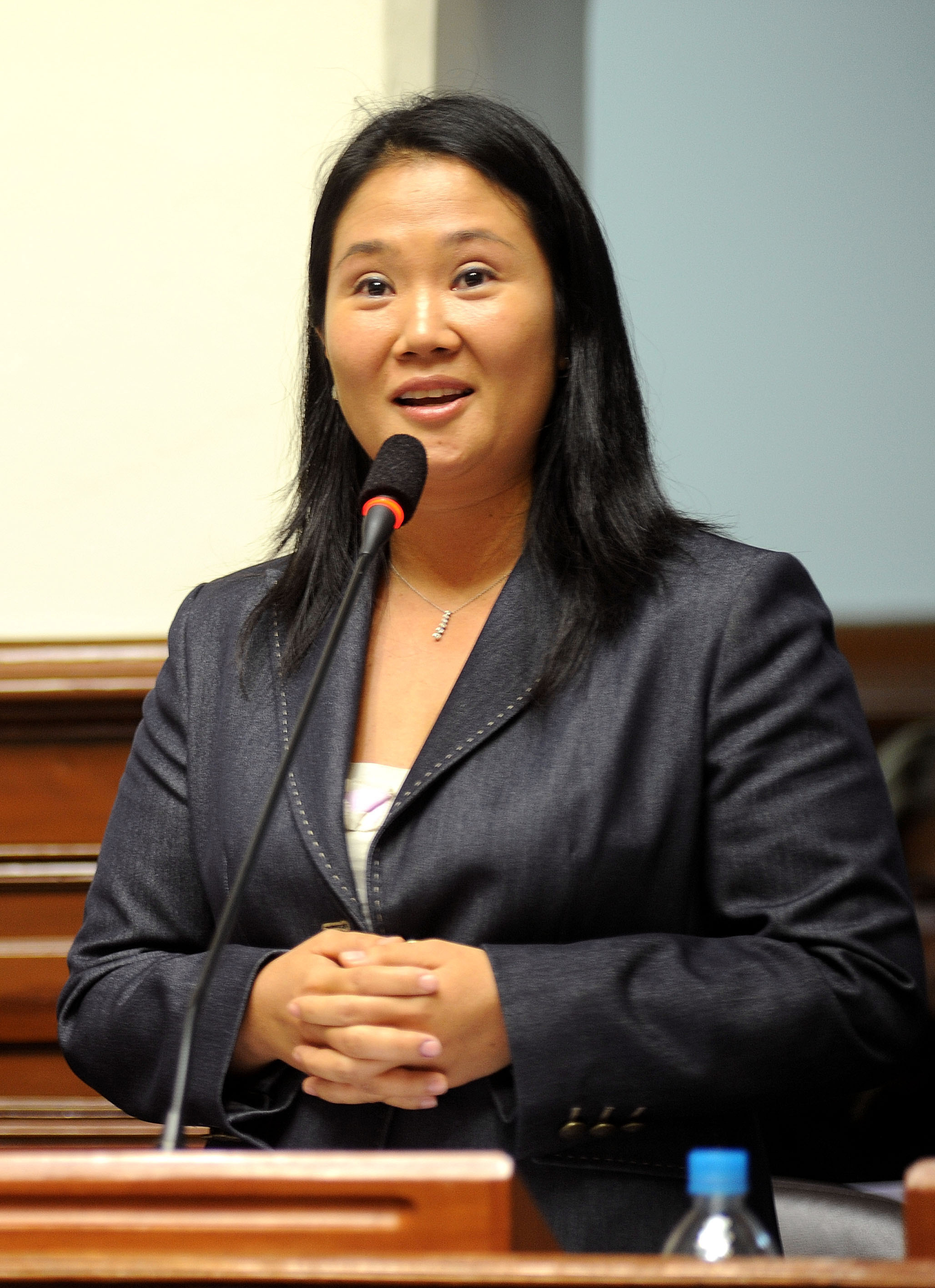
Keiko Fujimori
Leader of Fuerza Popular
Convicted

== El Niño Coastal Storm ==
In early 2017, the north coast of Peru began to suffer the ravages of the so-called El Niño, which became accentuated in February. This is an atypical phenomenon, which occurs almost unannounced. Unlike the typical El Niño phenomenon, which impacts the entire Pacific basin, affecting even climate on a planetary scale (and whose last devastating exponents have been those of 1983 and 1997–98), El Niño is focalized, since it only affects the coast of Peru and Ecuador. A similar event occurred in 1925, which was the prelude to the Niño of 1926, which is considered the third mega -child in importance of the twentieth century, only below those of 1983 and 1997–98.

Characteristic of this phenomenon are the intense rains. These are caused by the warming of the sea off the north coast of Peru, up to 29 °C, when the normal is 22º or a little more; this causes the water to evaporate, forming clouds that then precipitate as rain on the coast. The rains cause both landslides or mudslides, and river overflows or floods, severely affecting the populations settled in its path.

=== Areas affected ===
The most serious damages were verified in the departments of northern Peru: Tumbes, Piura and Lambayeque, which have endured intense rains, sometimes accompanied by thunderstorms, causing floods, damage to homes and destruction of crops. Several kilometers of roads were also damaged and a lot of unused bridges. Other affected departments have been La Libertad and Áncash. In Trujillo, several streets were flooded by water and mud; the mother channel of Chavimochic, from where the drinking water that is distributed to the city comes, suffered a rupture, reason why this service was suspended. Huarmey was completely flooded by the overflow of the river of the same name. In the province of Lima, the overflows of the rivers Chillón, Rímac, Huaycoloro and Lurín, affected several riverside localities, the most affected being: Cajamarquilla, Carapongo, Huachipa and Chosica.

The potable water supply of the Peruvian capital was also affected, since the waters of the rivers were loaded with garbage and mud, the task of capturing the water resource became more complicated, so the Drinking Water and Sewage Service of Lima (Sedapal), restricted the service for several days. Other provinces of Lima also suffered havoc: Huarochirí, where the most affected town were Santa Eulalia, and Cañete, whose capital, San Vicente de Cañete, suffered flood of the Río Pócoto.

Further south, the departments of Ica and Arequipa also suffered the ravages of the rains and the overflows of the rivers. In January, the activation of the streams caused the flooding of the town of La Tinguiña (Ica) . The city of Arequipa suffered restrictions in the potable water service, due to the high turbidity recorded in the Chili River, which made treatment system.

=== Government assistance ===
To respond to the emergency situation, the National Emergency Operations Center (COEN) was installed, headed by Defense Minister Jorge Nieto Montesinos (6 February 2017). President Kuczynski announced on 17 March that a priority of 2,500 million soles would be allocated to deal with disasters; also that facilities would be granted to municipalities and regional governments to execute and expedite the works for the improvement of disaster areas; as well as flexibility to a series of ministries so that they can reallocate the budget items, being the sectors that would have the largest budget those of Defense, Sanitation and Housing, Agriculture, Transport, Production, Health and Interior.

Nine ministers were also designated to organize aid to the different affected regions: Alfonso Grados (Tumbes); Marilú Martens (Piura); Eduardo Ferreyros (Lambayeque); Cayetana Aljovín (La Libertad); Marisol Pérez Tello (Áncash); Ana María Romero-Lozada (districts of Rímac, Cercado and San Juan de Lurigancho); Salvador del Solar (Huachipa and Carapongo); Gonzalo Tamayo (Chosica and Santa Eulalia); and Elsa Galarza (south boy to Mala).

As a sign of solidarity towards the victims, the government created the slogan "One force", which began to be used by institutions and people to call for help from citizens. The portal unasolafuerza.pe (#UnaSolaFuerza) was launched to provide up-to-date information on the emergence of the hurricanes and rains that affected the country.

=== Reconstruction with changes ===
In mid-April 2017 the ravages of the coastal Niño began to diminish. By then, the number of those killed in the entire territory of Peru was 113, the victims 178 701 and the people affected 1,049,083. The affected homes totaled 237,906. According to Minister Gonzalo Tamayo, the impact of the phenomenon was worse than of an earthquake, since 1,500 kilometers of simultaneous emergency were activated.

On 5 May 2017 it was announced that the authority in charge of the reconstruction would be Pablo de la Flor. The title of his position is: Executive Director of the Authority for Reconstruction with Changes. According to the Ministry of Economy and Finance, about 20 billion soles (about 6 billion dollars) is expected to be spent on reconstruction.

When questioned by the regional governors about the delays in the Reconstruction projects, Pablo de la Flor resigned his post at the end of October 2017. He was replaced by the economist Édgar Quispe.

== Social Issues ==
=== Social protests ===
==== Protest against the national school curriculum ====
At the beginning of 2017, the implementation of the National School Curriculum 2017, triggered the formation of a self-proclaimed collective with my children do not get involved (CMHNTM) to change it based on the argument that it promotes homosexuality.

In response, the Minister of Education Marilú Martens said that in the new contents the Curriculum seeks respect for diversity in society, promoting gender equality, in the sense of equal opportunities, rights and responsibilities for men and women without distinction.

Other advocates of the Curriculum noted the fact that the CMHNTM's criticisms stem from a confusion of concepts, about biological sex (male and female), gender identity and sexual orientation. These responses and other similar ones given by government spokesmen were considered arrogant by the leaders of the CMHNTM collective, since, according to them, they take advantage of values as precious as equality and respect for men and women, to smuggle and overlapping the "gender ideology" in the Curriculum.

As a protest, the CMHNTM organized a march on 4 March 2017, which was held nationwide, bringing together a total of 68,340 people throughout the country, of whom 25,000 were in Lima. Soon after, Minister Martens announced the realization of some changes in the School Curriculum, to specify concepts that could be confusing to parents, but making it clear that the gender equality approach remained unchanged.

==== Magisterial strike ====
One of the promises of Kuczynski's election campaign was the increase of teachers' salaries at all levels. In March 2017, by Supreme Decree No. 070-2017-EF, the increase for the appointed teachers was made official, passing the minimum wage from 1,554 soles to 1,780 soles, with the added promise that by March 2018 it would rise to 2000 With regard to those hired, it was decided that the increases would begin in November 2017.

However, protest voices rose in the teachers' union, which argued that Kuczynski's promise had been that the increase of 2,000 soles would be from 2017 and not from 2018, and that by 2021 it should reach 1 UIT, that is, 4,050 soles. Other requirements of the union were the payment of the social debt, the repeal of the Law of Public Magisterial Career, the leveling of the teachers hired with the appointed ones and that 10% of the GDP was dedicated to the Education sector.

On 15 June 2017, the teacher strike in Cuzco broke out, encouraged by the Sute-R, that is, the regional section of the SUTEP. Education Minister Marilú Martens responded that what the teachers demanded was not feasible, if the budget was realistically considered. The dialogue tables between the technical team of the Ministry of Education and the representatives of the teachers' union, sponsored by the Regional Government, failed successively, accusing each other of intransigence.

The government attributed the strike to the political motivations of the unions, where there were infiltrations by extremist elements, including Movadef, the political facade of the Shining Path. The teachers' strike extended to 13 regions, five of which were radicalized: Puno, Madre de Dios, Moquegua, Apurímac, as well as Cusco, which was the nerve center. In response, the Minister notified the Comptroller's Office to take the necessary measures to safeguard the educational service, and demanded that the Regional Governments proceed to dismiss the teachers and hire others, if necessary.

In search of a solution to the strike that had been going on for more than a month and a half, Minister Martens, Prime Minister Zavala, the 25 regional governors and the Regional Office of Lima met. They reached an agreement that was announced on 3 August, which consisted in the increase of S/.2000 will be held from December 2017 and no longer from March 2018. With this, the matter was considered solved and it was announced that the classes would restart on 7 August.

However, the teachers indicated that they were not represented in the agreements with the government, so they continued with the strike. On 8 August, the government signed another agreement, this time with the group of regional secretaries of SUTEP (Sute-R), agreeing to lift the strike in Cuzco, Lambayeque, Pasco and Lima Provincials. But in several regions the measure of strength was maintained (18 in total), because the Bases of the teachers' union did not consider themselves duly represented by the National Executive Committee (CEN) of the SUTEP, nor by the Sute-R. It was these Bases, gathered in the National Committee of Struggle of the Bases of the SUTEP and under the leadership of Pedro Castillo Terrones, which in reality ended up managing the mobilizations of the teachers in all the regions. The same Kuczynski president offered himself as mediator, inviting the delegates of the teachers to meet him in the Palace to reach a solution, but the strike got even worse, with the arrival in the capital of the striking teachers of the regions, those who carried out marches in the city and concentrations in the Plaza San Martín.

On 16 August, Martens presented himself to the education commission of the Congress, where he promised to receive the representatives of the regional bases. They accepted the invitation. On the evening of the same day, President Kuczynski, in a television message to the Nation, exhorted the teachers to strike down and return to the schools. While, on 18 August, dialogue began between the specialists of the Ministry of Education and the leaders of the teachers, who were joined by five congressmen representing the various parties (except for the Popular Force), who were in the capacity of overseers, but ended up becoming intermediaries.

After four days of meetings, a preliminary agreement was foreseen in which it appeared that the increase of S / 2000 would begin in November 2017, that would be leveled to teachers hired with those named in both salaries and social benefits, would be scheduled the payment of the social debt, would allow the voluntary retirement of teachers from 55 years of age, among other benefits for the teaching sector. However, when the signing of the agreement was only expected, the teachers announced that they would not do so, questioning the fact that the minister had not received them personally and had used the congressmen as intermediaries. But according to the report of the congressmen, it was because the teachers insisted that the evaluation of the teachers be suspended indefinitely and that was the point at which the Ministry of Education did not want to give the arm to twist, considering that the meritocracy in the teaching career it was something non-negotiable. It was then clarified that the teachers do not really oppose the evaluations, but rather the procedure that they intend to apply, which they described as having a subjective character. Interior Minister Carlos Basombrío Iglesias was also pointed out as having been a disturbing element in the negotiations, for organizing the leader of the bases, Pedro Castillo, as close to the Movadef senderista, and for saying that the government would not negotiate with that class of elements. .

Although a large section of the faculty held the strike, on 24 August the government issued a supreme decree formalizing the benefits mentioned in the pre-agreement, and the teachers were warned that if they did not return to the classroom after 28 August, new teachers would be hired. In the following week, the teacher marches in the capital followed, which included violent confrontations with the police. Until 2 September, the leader Pedro Castillo announced the temporary suspension of the strike, according to an agreement reached at the Extraordinary National Congress of the regional SUTEs.

==== Strikes in the health sector ====
On 4 July 2017, doctors from the Ministry of Health began an indefinite national strike to demand a series of improvements in their sector. The measure paralyzed care in various services, with the exception of the intensive care and emergency units. Among the claims of the Peruvian Medical Federation is the increase in the budget for the health sector and for the Comprehensive Health Insurance (SIS). They also demanded the resignation of the Minister of Health Patricia Garcia Funegra, who is responsible for the very poor situation of the sector, for not having requested a larger budget for the year 2017, which has generated the shortage of medicines, reagents and equipment. On 9 August, after a meeting of the representatives of the FMP with Prime Minister Fernando Zavala and Minister Patricia García, the strike was lifted, after agreeing an increase in the budget for the health sector that implies salary increases and greater supply of medicines and implements in health centers, among other agreements.

Likewise, the Federation of Nurses of the Ministry of Health of Peru (Fedeminsap), which brings together nurses working in establishments belonging to the Ministry of Health network (MINSA), began on 8 August 2017 an indefinite strike in all the regions, in demand for an increase in the budget of the Health and SIS sector, the approval of a new salary scale, the implementation of nursing head positions, and the increase in the number of nurses hired. Finally, on 19 August, after several sessions of dialogue between the Ministry of Health and the Federation, an agreement was reached, and the strike was lifted at a national level.

A national obstetric strike was also unleashed, which lasted 13 days, from 3 to 16 August 2017.

==== Agricultural stop of 2018 ====
On 9 January 2018, an "agrarian strike" was initiated in large part of the Peruvian territory by medium and small independent farmers who demanded that the government declare the agricultural sector in a state of emergency, due to serious deficiencies in production and trade, especially in the potato sector, whose price had collapsed severely affecting producers. According to experts, this was due to the fact that, as a consequence of the El Niño phenomenon, the plantings and harvests of potatoes had coincided in the various regions, causing overproduction.

On 30 January 2018, the demonstrations turned violent and expanded to other departments, causing road blocks and serious material damage. Clashes took place between the national police of Peru and the demonstrators who left two people dead, one in Huancavelica and the other in Pasco. On 2 February, the government reached an agreement with the National Commission of Potato Producers, promising to buy the surplus of white potatoes. Although other leaderships in Huánuco, Ayacucho and Apurímac did not accept that agreement and the protests continued.

=== National Census of 2017 ===
On 22 October 2017 the XII Population Census, VII Housing and III Indigenous Communities began, which culminated on 5 November. The entity in charge of its realization was the National Institute of Statistics and Informatics (INEI). The census questionnaire had 47 questions regarding housing and basic services; to home; the migration of the home and the formation of families; on gender, disability and ethnicity. For the urban census the immobility of citizenship was declared on 22 October, but serious deficiencies occurred in its development, mainly due to the lack of training of census takers, mostly young volunteers. The cost of this census was calculated in S/170 million (US$52 million).

== International relations ==
=== APEC 2016 ===
From 19 to 20 November 2016, the capital of Peru hosted the 28th annual meeting of the Asia-Pacific Economic Cooperation Forum (APEC), and the 24th of its leaders. For the second time, Lima assumed this responsibility, since it had already done so in 2008. It is a summit of the presidents and governors of the twenty-one member countries of the economic forum, including Barack Obama (United States), Vladimir Putin ( Russia) and Xi Jinping (China); and three presidents of Latin American countries: Michelle Bachelet (Chile), Enrique Peña Nieto (Mexico), as well as the president of the host country, Pedro Pablo Kuczynski. As guests attended the president of Colombia Juan Manuel Santos; Mark Zuckerberg (founder of Facebook); and Christine Lagarde (managing director of the IMF); among others.

The agreements taken by the members of APEC, contained in the Declaration of Lima, revolved around 4 pillars: foreign trade; workers and small business; the connectivity; and climate change and food security. The most important initiatives were oriented to counteract the tendencies against foreign trade that emerged in some important countries, such as the case of the electoral threat of Donald Trump in the United States.

=== Official visits of Kuczynski abroad ===
The first official visit of Kuczynski abroad went to China, in September 2016, where he met with President Xi Jinping, as well as with authorities of the political, business and commercial sector of that country. Kuczynski called this visit a success. Then he went to New York, where he participated in the 71 Period of Sessions of the General Assembly of the United Nations.

In November 2016 Kuczynski traveled to Chile, where he met with the president of that country, Michelle Bachelet. The bilateral agreements that were taken were the improvement of the infrastructure, the railroad from Tacna to Arica and the electrical interconnection for both cities. The start of the Binational Cabinets was also agreed.

On 24 February 2017, Kuczynski became the first Latin American president to visit United States President Donald Trump in the White House. The meeting lasted about 40 minutes. In a subsequent dialogue with journalists, Kuczynski said he had spoken about "issues of common interest, such as trade, migration, problems in Latin America and the possibility of a very good relationship with the United States." It also transpired that the situation in Venezuela was discussed.

From 6 to 14 June 2017, Kuczynski made an official visit to France and Spain, together with the Ministers of Foreign Affairs, Ricardo Luna; and of Economy and Finance, Alfredo Thorne. In France he held a meeting with President Emmanuel Macron, at the Elysee Palace, becoming the first Latin American president to be received by the French president, who had recently assumed office. In Spain he met with the head of the Government of that country, Mariano Rajoy.

On 15 September 2017, due to the ministerial cabinet crisis, Kuczynski suspended a scheduled trip to New York, where he was to attend the General Assembly of the United Nations. On 22 September, he traveled to Vatican City to meet with Pope Francisco and thank him for the official visit he would make to Peru in January 2018.

On 3 November 2017, Kuczynski made a trip to Argentina, to meet with President Mauricio Macri and sign several bilateral agreements. And on 9 November, he arrived in the city of Da Nang, in Vietnam, to attend the 25th Leaders Summit of the Asia-Pacific Economic Cooperation Forum (APEC). The trip included the signing of a free trade agreement between Peru and Australia.

On 10 March 2018, Kuczynski traveled to Chile to attend the inauguration of President Sebastián Piñera. He also met with presidents of other countries and the outgoing president of Chile, Michelle Bachelet.

=== Bi-national cabinets ===
In October 2016, the X Peru-Ecuador Binational Cabinet was held in Macas, a meeting of the Ministers of States and the presidents of both nations, where important agreements were agreed.

In November 2016, the Second Binational Cabinet Peru-Bolivia was held in Sucre, where presidents Kuczynski and Evo Morales met to sign the Sucre Declaration, in which they highlighted the importance of ministerial cabinets to contribute to the strengthening and deepening the relations of both countries.

In July 2017 the First Binational Cabinet Peru-Chile was held in Lima, which has been considered a historic event, as it inaugurated a different stage in the bilateral relations of the two countries. Several agreements were signed between the ministries and institutions of the two nations, and as a culmination, Presidents Kuczynski and Michelle Bachelet signed the Declaration of Lima.

In September 2017, the III Peru-Bolivia Binational Cabinet was held in the city of Lima, culminating in the Declaration of Lima signed by the presidents Kuczynski and Evo Morales.

In October 2017, the XI Peru-Ecuador Binational Cabinet was held in the city of Trujillo, attended by Ecuadorian President Lenín Moreno, who signed the Declaration of Trujillo with Kuczynski.

At the end of February 2018, the IV Binational Cabinet Peru-Colombia was held in Cartagena de Indias, which was attended by President Kuczynski, who met with his Colombian counterpart Juan Manuel Santos.

=== Relations with Venezuela ===
Peru was one of the countries with the most Venezuelan refugees. In the photo, a Peruvian citizen with a Venezuelan refugee who fled her country because of the current crisis.

The Peruvian government assumed a very active role with respect to the Venezuelan crisis. In March 2017 some diplomatic friction with Venezuela took place, as a result of some comments that Kuczynski made about the situation of that country, during his visit to the United States. Before the verbal attacks of the Venezuelan president Nicolás Maduro and his chancellor Delcy Rodríguez against Kuczynski, the Peruvian government called in consultation with his ambassador in Caracas, Mario López Chávarry.

In the message to the Nation of 28 July 2017, Kuczynski mentioned the situation in Venezuela, referring to the "decomposition of democratic institutions" and the "humanitarian crisis" that the country is experiencing, to conclude by saying that its objective was "to contribute to strengthen democracy throughout the region".

On 30 July 2017, the Peruvian government announced that it would not recognize the results of the "illegitimate election of the National Constituent Assembly" in Venezuela, and then summoned a meeting of foreign ministers from Latin American countries to evaluate the situation in that country. It was held on 8 August 2017, at the Torre Tagle Palace in Lima, and counted with the participation of 17 countries. A 16-point manifesto was signed, called the Lima Declaration, which condemns the breakdown of the democratic order in Venezuela and ignores the National Constituent Assembly.

The Venezuelan government sent a protest note to Peru, but it was declared by the Foreign Ministry of Peru as not received, because it contained "unacceptable terms." Then, the Government of Peru decided to expel the ambassador of Venezuela, Diego Molero Bellavia. In response, the Venezuelan government ordered the expulsion of the Chargé d'Affaires of Peru (since Peru had already withdrawn its ambassador since March).

On 16 February 2018, the Peruvian Foreign Ministry informed that it was withdrawing the invitation to Venezuelan President Nicolás Maduro to the VIII Summit of the Americas, scheduled to take place in Lima on 13 and 14 April. It was based on the provisions of the Declaration of Quebec of 2001, which literally says: "Any alteration or unconstitutional rupture of a democratic order in a State of the Hemisphere constitutes an insurmountable obstacle for the participation of the Government of that State in the Summit process. of the Americas."

=== Visit of Pope Francis ===
Between 18 and 21 January 2018, Pope Francis made a pastoral visit to Peru, choosing Puerto Maldonado (Madre de Dios), in the Peruvian jungle, as the center of a region affected by deforestation and human trafficking; and Trujillo for being the city most affected by the onslaught of El Niño. In all those places he received the fervor and affection of the people.

In Puerto Maldonado he had a meeting with the representatives of the Amazonian people and in his speeches he addressed issues such as illegal mining, human trafficking and violence against women. In Trujillo, he held a mass in the Huanchaco resort and toured the streets in the neighborhood of Buenos Aires affected by the El Niño. As a final act, the Pope offered a Mass at the Las Palmas Air Base in Lima, which according to the calculations of the Archdiocese of Lima brought together one and a half million people.

== Post-presidency ==
=== Transition to the Vizcarra Administration ===
Vice President, former Minister of Transport, and then Ambassador to Canada Martin Vizcarra succeeded Kuczynski and assumed the presidency, marking the end of Kuczynski presidency. Then second-vice president and Prime Minister Mercedes Aráoz assumed the role of first vice president, leaving the seat for second-vice president vacant. Shortly after on 2 April, Araoz resigned from the Prime Ministership, who believed that Vizcarra would completely replace Kuczynski's cabinet.

Vizcarra did in fact replace most of Kuczynski's cabinet, and the Vizcarra's new cabinet was inaugurated on 2 April 2018.

=== Investigations, Operation Car Wash, and Odebrecht ===
After Kuczynski successfully resigned from the impending congressional impeachment vote, Kuczynski's passport was immediately confiscated and the former head of state was restricted from leaving Peru. His multiple bank accounts were also frozen and were under investigation.

The former president remained out of the public eye for nearly a year, with rare public appearances and no interviews until a year after his resignation, unlike most of his predecessors. He gave an interview to El Comercio on the first anniversary of his resignation in March 2019, where he claimed that the suspicious payments he made immediately following his resignation were in fact his tax payments in 2018.

Soon, on 10 April of that year, a judge ordered for Kuczynski's arrest and authorized a detail search of his several properties and was ordered preventative detention for 10 days. He was later convicted and sentenced to 36 months of preventative prison. He appealed for house arrest due to his minor health issues and was granted house arrest until further investigations conclude.

=== Relations with Vizcarra ===
Kuczynski has mentioned that he has spoken multiple times with Vizcarra and has denied to comment whether he still believes that Vizcarra "betrayed" him.

During his hospitalization, Vizcarra has reportedly visited him once "as a friend" rather than a political move. Additionally, Vizcarra defended Kuczynski from being transferred from house arrest to prison.

=== Public persona ===
Peruvians see Pedro Pablo Kuczynski joining the line of disgraced and corrupt presidents that Peru has had for the past decades. Kuczynski's accomplishments during his brief, less than two-year presidency are seen as minimal and mediocre, having failed to address pressing issues of economic slumps, natural disasters, corruption, and more. Additionally, many Peruvians do note Kuczynski's broken campaign promise to not pardon former president Alberto Fujimori.

Kuczynski's presidency is also marked as a time of economic stability and a cheerleader of Peru to the rest of the world.

=== Health issues ===
Kuczynski claims to have heart issues.
