= Cayetana Aljovín =

Peruvian politician

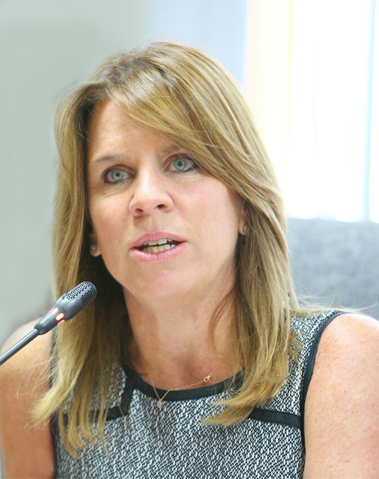

Minister of Foreign Relations
- In office 9 January 2018 – 2 April 2018
- President: Pedro Pablo Kuczynski; Martín Vizcarra
- Prime Minister: Mercedes Aráoz
- Preceded by: Ricardo Luna Mendoza
- Succeeded by: Néstor Popilizio

Minister of Energy and Mines
- In office 27 July 2017 – 9 January 2018
- President: Pedro Pablo Kuczynski
- Prime Minister: Fernando Zavala Lombardi; Mercedes Aráoz
- Preceded by: Gonzalo Tamayo
- Succeeded by: Ángela Grossheim

Minister of Development and Social Inclusion
- In office 28 July 2016 – 27 July 2017
- President: Pedro Pablo Kuczynski
- Prime Minister: Fernando Zavala Lombardi
- Preceded by: Paola Bustamante Suárez
- Succeeded by: Fiorella Molinelli

Deputy Minister of Communications
- In office 5 August 2006 – 27 September 2008
- President: Alan García
- Prime Minister: Jorge Del Castillo
- Minister: Verónica Zavala Lombardi
- Preceded by: Juan Antonio Pacheco Romaní
- Succeeded by: Gonzalo Martín Ruíz Díaz

Personal details
- Born: 6 September 1966 (age 59) Lima, Peru
- Party: Independent
- Education: Pontifical Catholic University of Peru (LLB); Adolfo Ibáñez University (MBA)
- Occupation: Journalist public administrator

Lucía Cayetana Aljovín Gazzani (born 6 September 1966) is a Peruvian lawyer, journalist and public administrator. In Pedro Pablo Kuczynski's administration, she served in three different portfolios between 2016 and 2018.

== Early life and education ==
Cayetana Aljovín was born on 6 September 1966 in Lima, Peru. Her parents are Javier Aljovín Swayne and Lucy Gazzani Bosworth, both of British descent. She is also the granddaughter of renowned medical doctor Miguel C. Aljovín. She completed her high school education at Colegio Villa María and Georgetown Visitation School.

She pursued her college education at the Pontifical Catholic University of Peru, from which she graduated in 1993 with a bachelor's degree in law. Subsequently, she attained a Master of Business Administration (MBA) at the Adolfo Ibáñez University, in Santiago, Chile.

== Career ==
In 1996, Aljovín was appointed advisor and member of the State Modernization Secretariat of the Office of the Prime Minister of Peru, within the framework of the reforms led by Prime Minister Alberto Pandolfi.

In the late 1990s, she was a member of the Telecommunications Privatization Committee of the Commission for the Promotion of Private Investment (COPRI) and a member of the board of directors of the Office of State Institutions and Organizations (OIOE). During this time, she specialized in topics related to investment promotion and telecommunications. Subsequently, in 1998, she held the general secretariat of the Ministry of Economy and Finance.

Between 2000 and 2006 she served as director of Bellsouth Peru, and as consultant to the Inter-American Development Bank, SDC, the Office of the Prime Minister of Peru and Nextel Peru (today Entel Peru).

At the start of the second presidency of Alan García, she was appointed deputy minister of communications of the Ministry of Transport and Communications, a position she held until 2008, when she was appointed executive director of the Agency for the Promotion of Private Investment (Proinversión).

In 2011, she held the presidency of the Communications Committee of the National Society of Mining, Oil and Energy. Simultaneously, she served as manager of corporate affairs at Cálidda from 2011 to 2012, and as general director of the subsidiary of the Spanish consulting firm Llorente & Cuenca, currently LLYC.

In early 2016, she was chosen as a pre-candidate for the Peruvian Congress for Peruvians for Change; however, she gave up her candidacy for private reasons. During the 2016 campaign, she was elected as executive vice president of the National Confederation of Private Business Institutions (CONFIEP).

In the academic field, she has served a professor of telecommunications law at the Pontifical Catholic University of Peru, the Universidad Peruana de Ciencias Aplicadas, the National University of San Marcos and the Government Institute of the Universidad de San Martín de Porres. In addition, she has been a journalistic presenter on Radio Programs of Peru and the Sunday newscast Panorama, on Panamericana Televisión (Channel 5).

In July 2018, she was appointed director of Azerta Peru and Interbank.

In 2019 she was elected as president of the National Fisheries Society.

=== Presidency of Pedro Pablo Kuczynski (2016–2018) ===
As president-elect Pedro Pablo Kuczynski began to compose his first cabinet, Aljovín was nominated as Minister of Development and Social Inclusion. She was sworn in on 28 July 2016. During her tenure, she promoted access to public services, entrepreneurship and employability for income generation by families with limited economic resources.

On 27 July 2017, she was rotated in the cabinet as Minister of Energy and Mines. In this position, she presented to Congress a bill to promote the hydrocarbon industry, with the aim of improving sector regulations, increasing investments in exploration activities, increasing production and improving the transparency and efficiency of contracts.

On 9 January 2018, president Kuczynski recomposed his government with a Cabinet of Reconciliation, following the failed impeachment process against him from December 2017. In this reshuffle, Aljovín was sworn in as Minister of Foreign Relations. As such, she was in charge of organizing the 8th Summit of the Americas. In the same way, she led the meetings of the Lima Group that asked the government of Nicolás Maduro to reconsider the conduction of democratic elections in Venezuela. She was also in charge of communicating the withdrawal of the invitation to the Venezuelan head of state to participate in the Summit.

With the resignation of Pedro Pablo Kuczynski to the Peruvian Presidency, Aljovín resigned from her ministerial position, and was replaced by career-diplomat Néstor Popolizio, in Martín Vizcarra's administration.

== Personal life ==
Aljovín was married to the late Fritz du Bois Freund (1955–2014), former director of the daily newspaper El Comercio.
