= Claudia Cooper =

Peruvian economist and politician

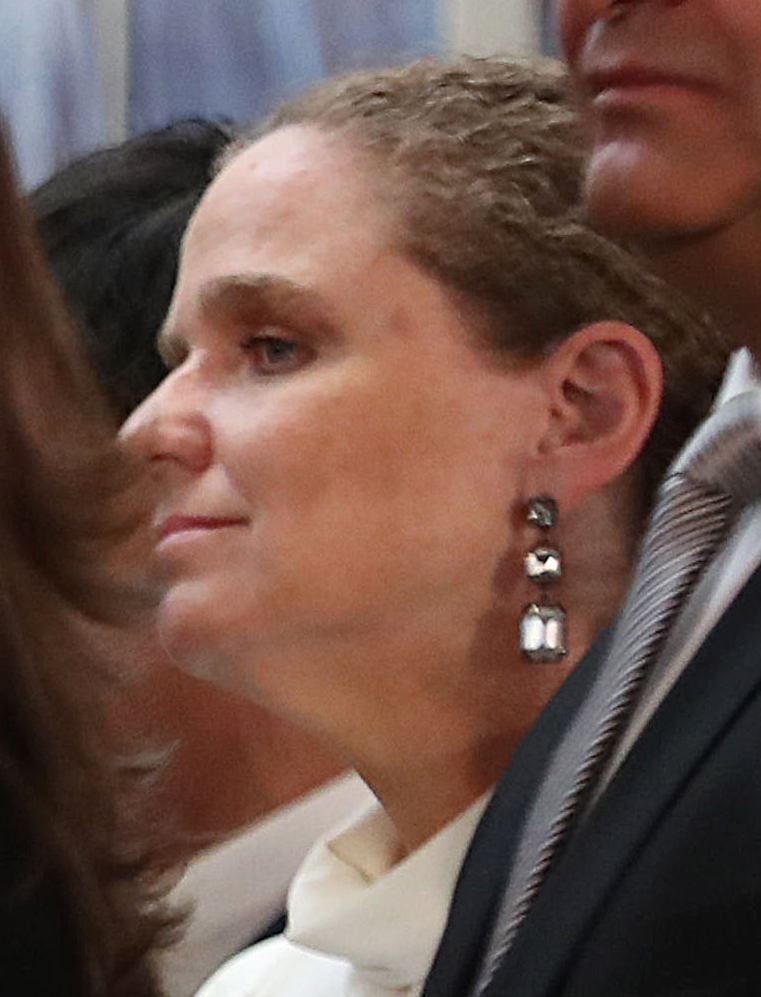
- Cooper in 2018

Minister of Economy and Finance
- In office September 2017 – April 2018
- Preceded by: Fernando Zavala Lombardi
- Succeeded by: David Tuesta Cárdenas

Personal details
- Born: 13 September 1968 (age 57)
- Education: Universidad del Pacifico; New York University
- Profession: Economist

Claudia María Amelia Teresa Cooper Fort (born 13 September 1968) is a Peruvian economist and former politician who was the Minister of Economy and Finance from September 2017 until April 2018.

== Education ==
She completed a bachelor's degree in Economics at Universidad del Pacifico and a Master's degree and PhD in Economics at New York University.

== Career ==
Prior to entering politics, she had experience in academia as a researcher at Universidad del Pacifico and New York University, and had extensive experience working in a range of roles in finance in both the private and public sectors, including various roles in Banco de Crédito del Perú and as a member of the Advisory Board of the Ministry of Economy and Finance.

=== Political career ===
In July 2016, she became deputy minister of the Ministry of Economy and Finance. In September 2017, she was promoted to head the ministry and serve in the Cabinet as Minister of Economy and Finance. In April 2018, Cooper resigned as Economy and Finance minister in solidarity with President Pedro Pablo Kuczynski being forced by Congress to step down.

=== Career after politics ===
In April 2019, Cooper was appointed Chair of the Board of Directors of the Lima Stock Exchange, and was appointed to the boards of various other financial institutions and as a Vice President of a mining company.
