= Marilú Martens =

Peruvian politician

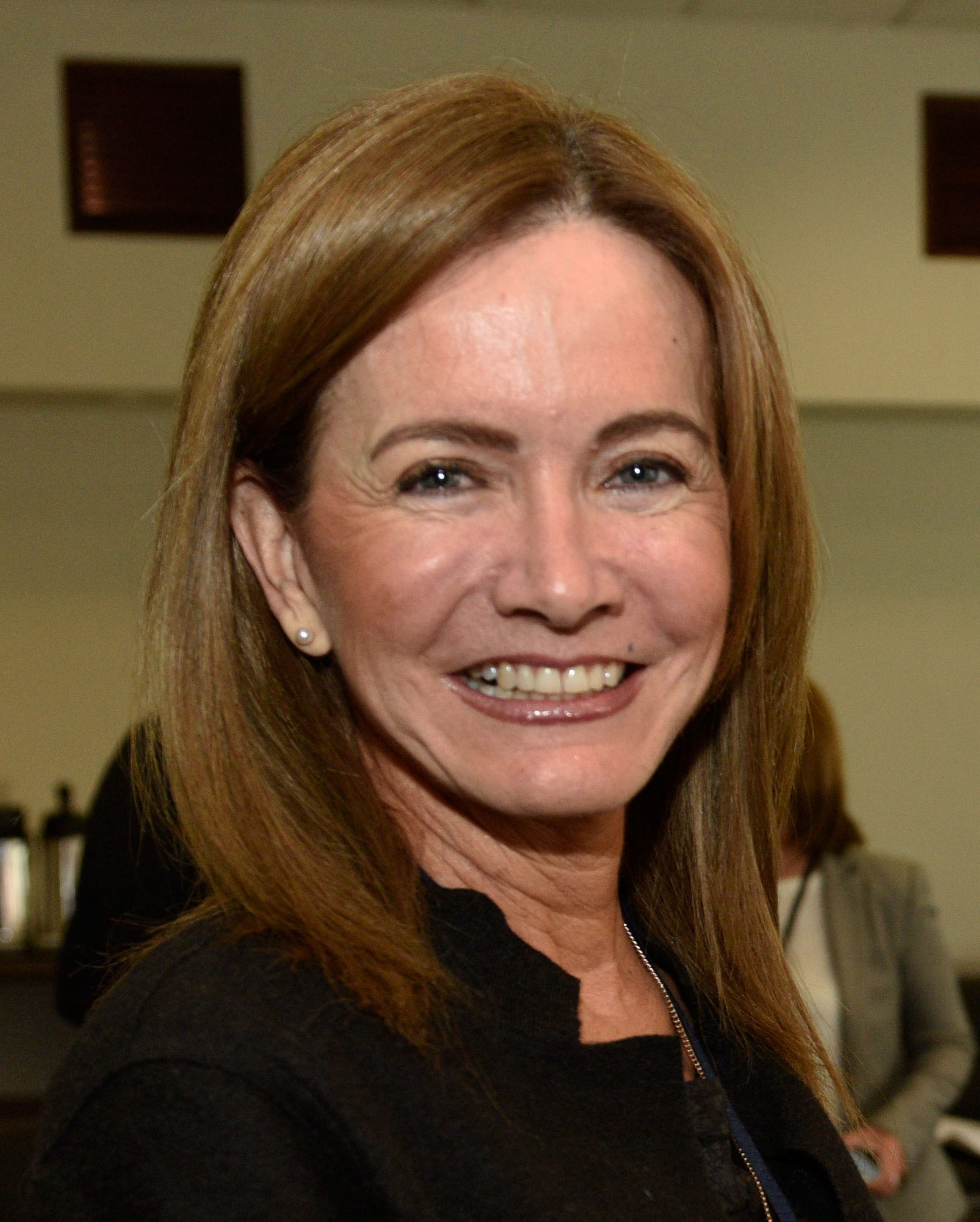
Marilú Martens

Marilú Martens is a Peruvian politician. She was Minister of Education of Peru from December 18, 2016, to September 17, 2017.
