= Fernando Zavala =

Prime Minister of Peru

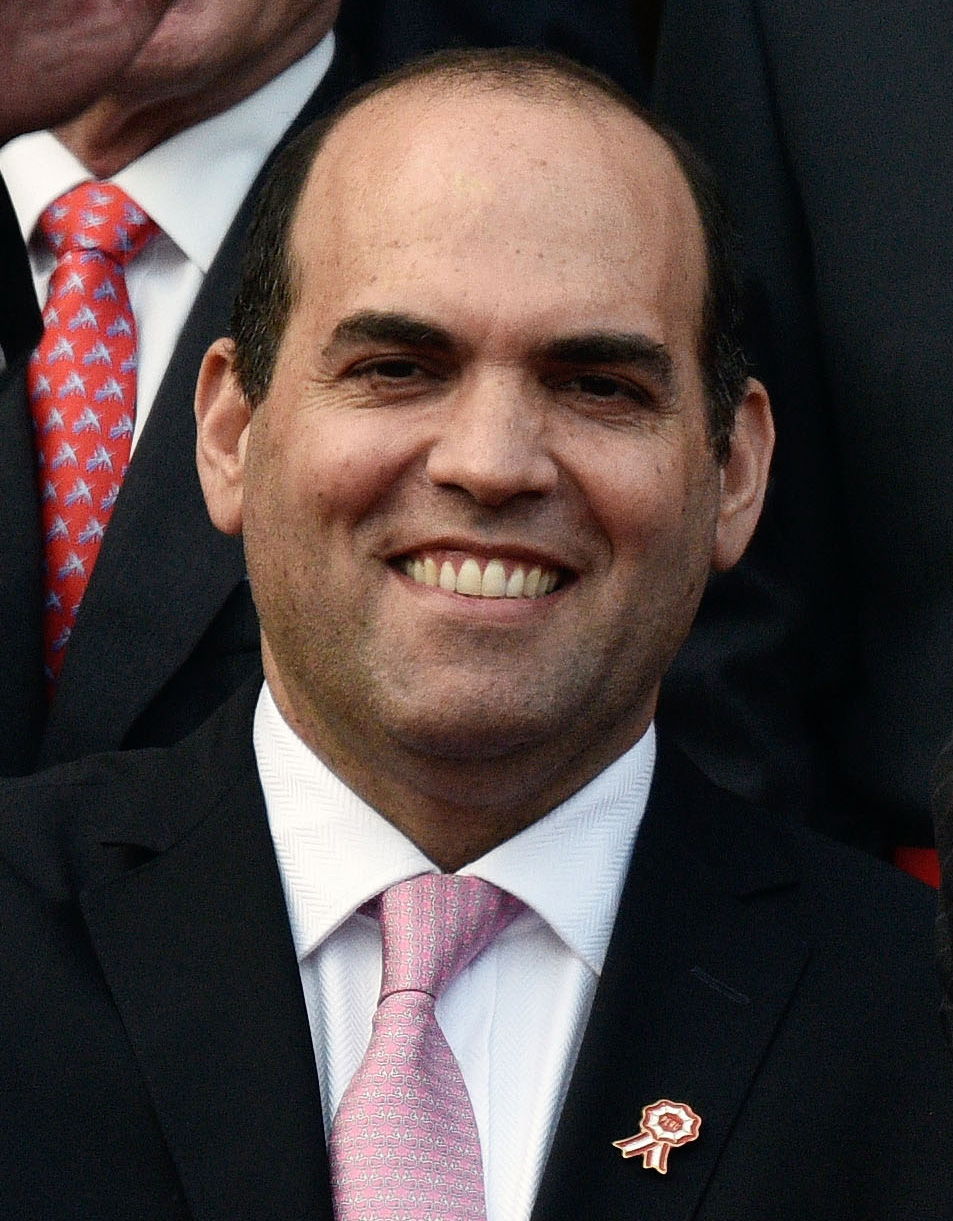
- Zavala in 2016

Prime Minister of Peru
- In office 28 July 2016 – 17 September 2017
- President: Pedro Pablo Kuczynski
- Preceded by: Pedro Cateriano
- Succeeded by: Mercedes Aráoz

Minister of Economy and Finance
- In office 23 June 2017 – 17 September 2017
- President: Pedro Pablo Kuczynski
- Prime Minister: Fernando Zavala
- Preceded by: Alfredo Thorne
- Succeeded by: Claudia Cooper
- In office 16 August 2005 – 28 July 2006
- President: Alejandro Toledo
- Prime Minister: Pedro Pablo Kuczynski
- Preceded by: Pedro Pablo Kuczynski
- Succeeded by: Luis Carranza

Deputy Minister of Economy
- In office 19 April 2002 – 16 August 2005
- President: Alejandro Toledo
- Prime Minister: Roberto Dañino; Luis Solari; Beatriz Merino; Carlos Ferrero
- Minister: Pedro Pablo Kuczynski; Javier Silva Ruete; Jaime Quijandría Salmón
- Preceded by: Patricia Teullet Pipoli
- Succeeded by: Javier Abugattás Fatule

Personal details
- Born: 16 February 1971 (age 55) Tacna, Peru
- Party: Independent
- Education: University of the Pacific (BA); University of Piura (MBA); University of Birmingham (MBA)

Fernando Martín Zavala Lombardi (Spanish pronunciation: [feɾˈnando maɾˈtin saˈβala lomˈbaɾði]; born 16 February 1971) is a Peruvian politician, who was the Prime Minister of Peru from 28 July 2016 to 17 September 2017. Previously he was the president of Backus and Johnston, a subsidiary of SABMiller. From 2005 to 2006 he was Minister of Economy and Finance.

== Early life and education ==
Zavala was born in Tacna in 1971 to José Zavala Rey de Castro and María Fedora Elisabeth Lombardi Oyarzu. On his mother's side, he is the nephew of prominent Peruvian filmmaker Francisco J. Lombardi.

Following the completion of his high school education at the Colegio de la Inmaculada (the Jesuit school of Peru) in 1987, Zavala was admitted to the University of the Pacific, graduating in 1993 with a bachelor's degree in economics. He ultimately attained two Masters of Business Administration, from the University of Piura and the University of Birmingham, respectively.

== Career ==
Zavala started his career in the private sector as assistant manager of Samtronics Peru. He was also Chief Financial Officer of Apoyo S.A. (Now Ipsos Perú S.A.), in the positions of consultant and pollster.

In 1995, Zavala was appointed CEO of Peru's National Institute for the Defense of Competition and Protection of Intellectual Property (INDECOPI), a position he held until 2000 in order to enter the Minister of Economy and Finance as a consultant.

== Political career ==
At the Minister of Economy and Finance led by Pedro Pablo Kuczynski, Zavala was appointed Deputy Minister of Economy in April 2002, serving through August 2005 as President Alejandro Toledo reshuffled his cabinet and named Kuczynski Prime Minister of Peru. In this reshuffle, Zavala succeeded Kuczynski in the Ministry, serving until the end of Toledo's presidential term in July 2006.

Upon retiring from the government, Zavala returned to the private sector as he began working at Backus and Johnston as Vice President of Strategy and Corporate Relations. After three years in office, he was named the president of National Brewery – SABMiller Panamá. In November 2013 he returned to Peru as president of Backus and Johnston. Zavala has been a member of the boards of directors of Interbank, Alicorp, inmobiliaria IDE, Cerveceria San Juan, Banco Falabella, and Enersur.

=== Prime Minister of Peru ===
On 15 July 2016 President-elect Pedro Pablo Kuczynski confirmed him as head of his ministerial cabinet. On 18 July, during the inauguration, he was sworn in at a ceremony held in the courtyard of honor of the Government Palace, in the open air and in full view of the public. He held the office until 17 September 2017, after his cabinet was successfully censored by a vote of no confidence two days earlier.

On 23 June 2017 Fernando Zavala became the Minister of Economy and Finance replacing Alfredo Thorne.

Political offices
Preceded by Pedro Cateriano	Prime Minister of Peru; 2016–2017	Succeeded by Mercedes Aráoz
