= Second presidency of Alan García =

Peruvian presidential administration from 2006 to 2011

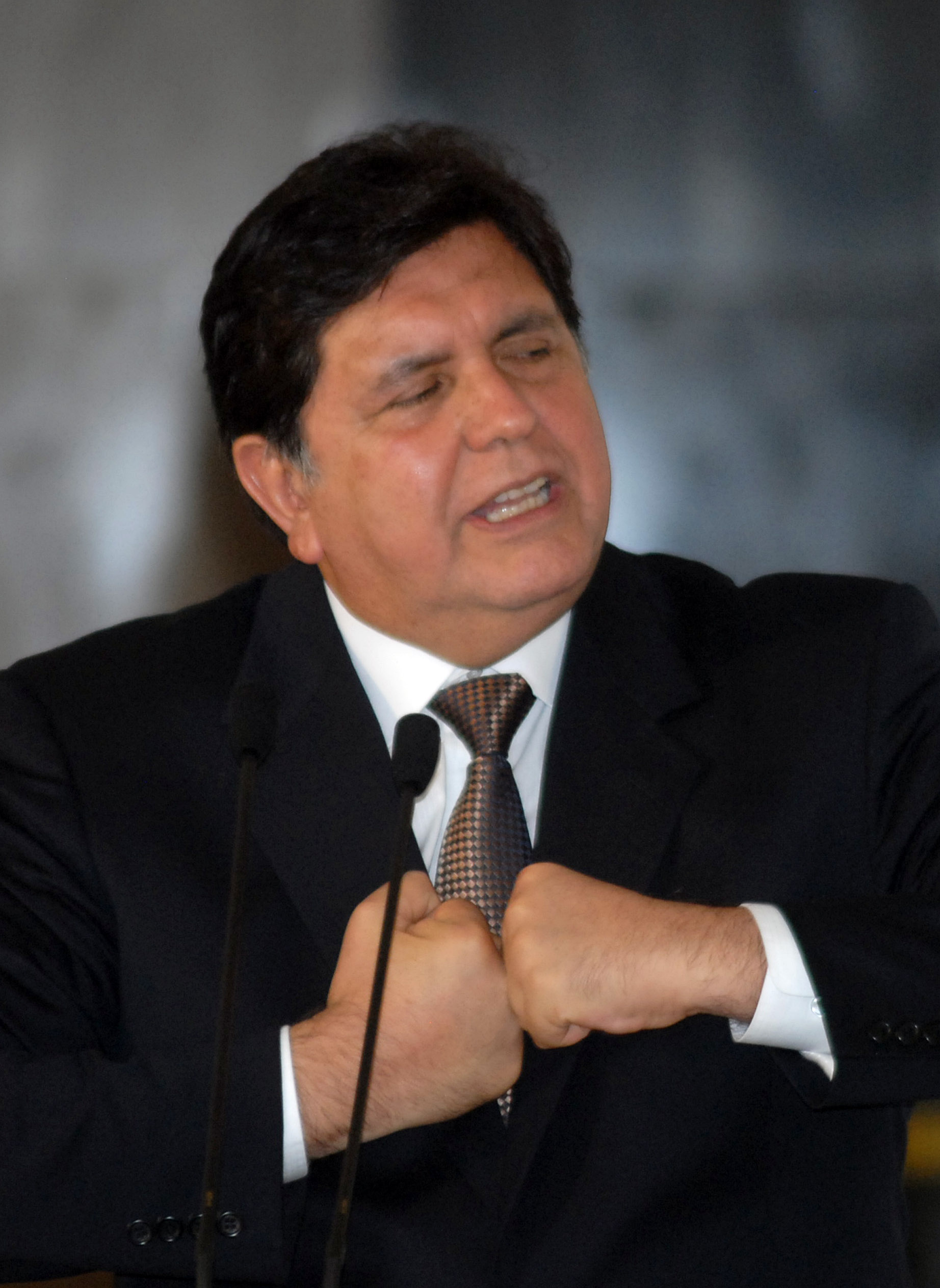
- García in 2006
- Second presidency of Alan García; 28 July 2006 – 28 July 2011
- Vice President: Luis Giampietri, Lourdes Mendoza
- Cabinet: See list
- Party: APRA
- Election: 2006
- Standard of the President

The second presidency of Alan García (2006–2011) began with the successful economic growth of the country recovering from the crisis of the first presidency of Alan García in the 1980s. Presidents Alberto Fujimori (1990–2000) and Alejandro Toledo (2001–2006) began with new neoliberal economic policies after García's crisis.

== Background ==
After the National Office of Electoral Processes counted 100.00% of the votes, confirming that Alan García Pérez was the new President of Peru. On 21 June 2006, the National Elections Jury credited him as President Elect, succeeding Alejandro Toledo, who was his rival in 2001.

=== Announcements ===
During the transition period, García made numerous announcements that would take his future administration. Among the major announcements made, include the creation of the Ministry of Fishing and future Ministry of Culture and Sports. He also announced that his Cabinet would peer, receiving praise from Lourdes Flores, leader of the opposition, who focused his campaign on the issue of women's equality.

Garcia Perez met on 11 July with Lourdes Flores, President of the Christian People's Party and Leader of National Unity (Peru). The event that took place at the home of Flores, lasted an hour and covered the country's reality topics. García denied that he had offered a Flores ministerial post. However, a few weeks later, he explained that he had offered her the office of Prime Minister of Peru and a government coalition.

On 20 July, he announced two members of his cabinet: José Antonio García Belaúnde as Foreign Affairs Minister and Luis Carranza as Economy and Finance Minister. García Belaúnde's appointment was welcomed by all public and private sectors while Carranza was only received positively by the business community and experts on economic issues. The General Confederation of Workers of Peru and the representatives of the Union for Peru described Carranza's appointment as a continuation of the neoliberal model of Alejandro Toledo and Alberto Fujimori, and as an approach to the right of Lourdes Flores, who described the appointment of Carranza in the Ministry as "extraordinary".

As part of his private life, and after the publication of an article by journalist César Hildebrandt, on 23 October, it was confirmed that García had a sixth child out of wedlock with his wife, Pilar Nores. Federico Dantón García Cheesman was recognized by the President as his son, product of a relationship that remained when he was separated from his wife in 2005. Immediately, received some praise from MPs for having publicly admitted his son, but others like Lourdes Flores (leader of the opposition) or Congressman Daniel Abugattás, criticized him for being "unfaithful" and Pilar Nores for "accepting any grievance of her husband".

In October 2007, he also announced the creation of the National Anti-Corruption Bureau, appointing Carolina Lizarraga as head of the agency. The announcement was criticized by the Comptroller's Office, the Attorney General and the Chief Justice and that could be a "duplication of functions".

== Oath of Office ==
On 28 July 2006 was held the ceremony of transfer of power. The ceremony, was attended by President Luiz Inácio Lula da Silva of Brazil, Evo Morales of Bolivia, Michelle Bachelet of Chile, Nicanor Duarte Frutos of Paraguay, Manuel Zelaya of Honduras, Alvaro Uribe of Colombia, Martin Torrijos Espino of Panama, Alfredo Palacio Gonzalez of Ecuador and Antonio Saca of El Salvador, and the Prince of Asturias, the President of the Senate of Algeria, Abbelkader Bensalah, the Minister of Culture of China, Zheng Jian Sung, the Deputy Prime Minister and Minister of Foreign Affairs of Luxembourg, Jean Asselborm, and the Secretary of State of Poland, Andrzeg Krawczyk. Representing other countries, traveled representatives of Argentina, Uruguay, United States, Russia, China, Luxembourg, Mexico, Algeria, Japan and other official delegations. Alan García began his presidency at 11:41 am (Peru time), breaking the protocol because the President of Congress, Mercedes Cabanillas didn't put the presidential ribbon, but he did it himself because of his height, though some think that he made it because of his desire for prominence.

== Home Affairs ==
García Pérez began his presidency on 28 July 2006, presenting numerous bills and decrees that reduced the salaries of political offices of the Peruvian State. His Defense Minister Allan Wagner announced that approval would resume military spending with Chile, this news was confirmed by the Minister of Foreign Affairs of Chile, Alejandro Foxley. On 4 August 2006, Garcia Perez met with María Teresa Fernández de la Vega, First Deputy Prime Minister of Spain, with whom he discussed issues on relations between Spain and Peru. Fernández de la Vega also spoke about Spain's support to indigenous communities of Peru, as well as investments in Peru.

García Pérez traveled on 5 August to Puno and Tacna, accompanied by Prime Minister of Peru Jorge Del Castillo, the Minister of Transportation and Communications Verónica Zavala Lombardi and Congressman Cesar Zumaeta. In his first trip to the interior of Peru, Puno enacted in the new zone and Tacna to give importance to the bridge Admiral Grau and Tacna Railway Department.

As part of his campaign promise, on 8 August, proposed a referendum on the return of the death penalty for child rapists. His proposal was immediately endorsed by congressmen as Lourdes Alcorta or Luisa María Cuculiza, however he found opposition in Vice Presidents Luis Giampietri and Lourdes Mendoza del Solar. The Congress of the Republic of Peru would be in discussion internally or whether to accept the proposal of the President. The announcement caused conflicting opinions even within the Cabinet.

The Minister of Transportation and Communications Verónica Zavala, announced that during the administration of García, it was delivered in several airports concession interior of Peru. Also, Pilar Mazzetti (Interior Minister) launched the "Cobweb Plan 2" with the purchase of over 200 motorcycles for the National Police of Peru. He also announced that during the administration of García, the police could experience wage increases over the next nine months as the austerity policy as permitted. On 18 August, he received the "frigate BAP Bolognesi", in a meeting chaired by him, the Vice Presidents Luis Giampietri and Lourdes Mendoza and Defense Minister Allan Wagner. That same day, the law that integrates numerous taxi drivers integrated in the Health System in a ceremony at the Presidential Palace, accompanied by Congressman Mauricio Mulder and several party members.

On 20 August, Construction announced a nationwide strike against the government of García Pérez for allegedly not fulfilling his campaign promises. The political class, led by Luis Gonzales Posada rejected this statement as inconsistent and even Ollanta Humala had been accused of causing this austerity act. As shown, Alan García enrolled in the Social Health Insurance (EsSalud), 22 August 2006, resigning to life insurance also had Alejandro Toledo.

Only the next day, the Yanacocha mine ceased operations entirely, over the protests of the villagers. Quickly, Jorge Del Castillo, Juan Valdivia and Pilar Mazzetti were branded as inefficient in their positions for allowing the conflict leading to such an outcome. On 29 August, after difficult negotiations in the office of Prime Minister of Peru, it was agreed to address the needs of Yanacocha Cajamarca and reopen their puertas.

On 8 September 2006, initiated the project against illiteracy, accompanied by Education Minister José Antonio Chang and Labour Minister Susana Pinilla. His government invested about 350 million Peruvian new soles annually to support this project, hoping to end illiteracy in 2011. The next day, he received his first major demonstration against the government, led by the General Confederation of Workers of Peru and Ollanta Humala, causing great congestion on major roadways of Lima. The march was aimed, at García sue fulfilling his campaign promises.

To not have more accidents, Garcia launched the plan "Zero Tolerance", which seeks to those vehicles that do not meet even a Requista, unable to navigate the roads. He was accompanied by Verónica Zavala Lombardi. The 8 January 2007, the assessment was conducted for teachers of Peru, a program that was rejected by Trade Union of Education Workers of Peru and its Secretary General Caridad Montes considered inadequate and also by the demonization of the victims were being teachers, the process was proposed by President García with the approval of important political and social leaders. On 11 January 2007, Congress rejected his project to apply the death penalty for those who commit acts of terrorism, voting for the APRA and Fujimorist and against the Nationalists, upepistas, and members of National Unity and Parliamentary. the same day, however, proposed a referendum to ask the people on this matter, although would take place before a constitutional change since the Constitution does not allow referendums to restrict fundamental rights (in this case life).

On this matter, was criticized by both opposition leaders. Ollanta Humala expressed his opposition to the views of the President on the raid Inter-American Court of Human Rights, claiming that Peru must abide by. Similarly, Lourdes Flores said that Garcia can not return to "have caprices" as he had during his first term in the case of the nationalization of banks and not pay the foreign debt.

=== Scandals ===
==== Petrogate Scandal ====
In October 2008, spread of audios between government officials negotiating the delivery of oil blocks to a foreign company. After the audio was revealed which involves the Prime Minister Jorge Del Castillo and Minister Juan Valdivia, Cabinet members resigned their positions to President Alan García. Garcia lamented and accepted the resignation of the cabinet. Following the resignation of the Council of Ministers, Governor of Lambayeque Yehude Simon was appointed Prime Minister of Peru, succeeding Jorge Del Castillo.

==== Amazon Scandal ====
On 5 June 2009, Interior Minister Mercedes Cabanillas ordered the police to recover the roads taken by the Amazon Indians that had blocked in the Bagua region. The Indians demonstrated against special decrees that had been enacted by the executive branch, governing the exploitation of uncultivated land to exploit non-renewable resources and renewable. In the attempt to unlock 10 Indians killed and 24 policemen. According to witnesses, the bodies of the Indians killed were thrown into rivers. Furthermore, an important part of the policemen sent were executed by a group of Indians, cops being unarmed. These facts could not be confirmed either by the Ombudsman or by the special mission by the United Nations. After that Congress questioned the Prime Minister Yehude Simon and Minister Mercedes Cabanillas, then filed a motion of no confidence in both, which was unsuccessful. On 8 July, Alan Garcia announced a cabinet reshuffle on 11 July and Javier Velásquez was named Prime Minister.

== Economic policy ==
The growth of gross domestic product (GDP) in 2006 was almost 8% and for the next two years, the figure ranged close to 9%, due to the effects of the global crisis in 2009 grew by 1.12% and 2010 the change was positive in 8.78%. In addition, a five-year period that saw GDP grow by 7.2%, despite its initial projections of 5.3%. Certainly, mining and international prices of metals are responsible for such important figures. With Net international reserves are U.S. $47,059 million at the end of June, according to the Central Reserve Bank (BCR). With proper management of the economy, Peru could overcome without major global recession that hit the main buyers, the U.S., China, etc.

=== Foreign Trade Agreement ===
With different nuances, part of the boom in Peruvian exports was due to an aggressive policy of signing FTAs that while it may have been more beneficial to the Peru-in the protection of biodiversity and the issue of medicines, for example, has meant the arrival of flag products to untapped markets. In addition to the FTA with the U.S., Chile and China, have signed another with Canada, Singapore, EFTA (Switzerland, Liechtenstein, Iceland and Norway), Thailand, South Korea, Mexico and the European Union.

== Ministers of State ==
On 27 July 2006, Alan García announced the members of the first Council of Ministers, which is chaired by Jorge Del Castillo, a close friend of Garcia Perez and secretary general of APRA. Highlights include five women, the highest in the history of Peru and one of the highest in Latin America, as well as numerous independent workers of the Toledo regime, while only seven members of the council were APRA members. With Mazzetti's resignation in February 2007, there were five women and one APRA member added to the Cabinet.

Between 12 and 15 August, the Housing Minister Hernán Garrido Lecca had a verbal fight with Congressman and former Minister of State Carlos Bruce, for allegedly lied to the country about works to be undertaken without tenders. The next day he met with Jorge Del Castillo to fix the differences. The same day, Labour Minister Susana Pinilla, said that her predecessor Carlos Almería, had committed serious acts of corruption in the program "Urban Work" charging for quality, money that would be given to his people trusted and even Alejandro Toledo. Also, Pilar Mazzetti was denounced for allegedly placed his close friend to a post in the Ministry of the Interior of Peru that had disappeared in 2005.

On 25 August 2006, were presented to the Congress of Peru in an anecdotal session, in order to obtain the vote of confidence. During his presentation, Congressman Víctor Andrés García Belaúnde announced the death of Valentín Paniagua, interrupting the presentation of Jorge Del Castillo's Cabinet. Later it was confirmed that he was not dead, but causing discomfort relief among those present, who had given him a minute of silence in a "posthumous" tribute. Then Congressman Miro Ruiz, gave a "knee" at Ministry of Energy and Mines of Peru Holder since, according to him and their constituents, the government negotiates "knees" with miners.

Finally, after the floor debate, obtained the support of the APRA party, National Unity Parliamentary Group and Fujimorist Parliamentary Alliance. The members of the Union for Peru abstained, while the Peruvian Nationalist Party voted against.68 to 69. On 9 September 2006, former candidate for First Vice President Arturo Woodman was appointed as Chairman of the Peruvian Institute of Sport and despite not being a ministry, it has cabinet level.

On 24 February 2007, Pilar Mazzetti resigned the office of the Interior, the first floor of the Cabinet presided by Jorge Del Castillo. Pilar Mazzetti was replaced in office by former Vice President Luis Alva Castro, swearing on 26 February of that year. A similar problem was when Juan José Salazar resigned the office of Minister of Agriculture, and was replaced by economist Ismael Benavides Ferreyros.

In October 2007, President García ministerial changes announced by Jorge Del Castillo, ratifying it in some way in the post. This could be considered a "milestone" in Peru it is the first time there is talk of ministerial changes without the departure of Prime Minister of Peru. Among the rumors out of the press were Verónica Zavala Lombardi, María Zavala Valladares and Carlos Vallejos Sologuren. Likewise, also spoke of a "castling" Susana Pinilla to go to the Ministry of Women and another for Luis Alva Castro go to the Ministry of Defence, but also speculated that Mercedes Cabanillas take that position.

However, on 19 December were announced ministerial changes and changes were 6, 2 rotations and four new ministers, who swore on 20 December 2007. In addition, on 13 May 2008, García created the Ministry of Environment, being its first holder, Antonio Brack Egg. Oath on 16 May of that year, during the V EU-LAC Summit.

After the Bagua Scandal in the Amazon, Yehude Simon resigned with the whole cabinet. President of Congress Javier Velásquez was appointed on 11 July 2009. On 14 September 2010, Javier Velásquez resigned the office of Prime Minister of Peru because of his intention to run for President of Peru, but he wasn't elected in the primary elections. President García appointed Education Minister José Antonio Chang as Prime Minister, but he only lasted until March 2011, because he needed to take care of his university. Minister of Justice Rosario Fernández was appointed by García as his last Prime Minister and head of cabinet. His Presidency ended on 28 July 2011, without giving the presidential ribbon to President Elect Ollanta Humala.

=== Cabinet ===
Ministerio	Nombre	Periodo
Prime Minister	Jorge Del Castillo	28 July 2006 – 14 October 2008
Prime Minister	Yehude Simon Munaro	14 October 2008 – 11 July 2009
Prime Minister	Javier Velásquez Quesquén	11 July 2009 – 14 September 2010
Prime Minister	José Antonio Chang	14 September 2010 – 19 March 2011
Prime Minister	Rosario Fernández Figueroa	19 March 2011 – 28 July 2011
Foreign Relations (Chancellor)	José Antonio García Belaúnde	28 July 2006 – 28 July 2011
Defense	Allan Wagner Tizón	28 July 2006 – 20 December 2007
Defense	Antero Flores Aráoz	20 December 2007 – 11 July 2009
Defense	Rafael Rey Rey	11 July 2009 – 14 September 2010
Defense	Jaime Thorne León	14 September 2010 – 28 July 2011
Agriculture	Juan José Salazar	28 July 2006 – 20 May 2007
Agriculture	Ismael Benavides Ferreyros	22 May 2007 – 14 October 2008
Agriculture	Carlos Leyton Muñoz	14 October 2008 – 11 July 2009
Agriculture	Adolfo de Córdova Vélez	11 July 2009 – 14 September 2010
Agriculture	Rafael Quevedo Flores	14 September 2010 – 13 May 2011
Agriculture	Jorge Villasante Araníbar	13 May 2011 – 28 July 2011
Labour and Promotion of Employment	Susana Pinilla	28 July 2006 – 20 December 2007
Labour and Promotion of Employment	Mario Pasco Cosmópolis	20 December 2007 – 14 October 2008
Labour and Promotion of Employment	Jorge Villasante Araníbar	14 October 2008 – 11 July 2009
Labour and Promotion of Employment	Manuela García Cochagne	11 July 2009 – 28 July 2011
Women and Social Development	Virginia Borra	28 July 2006 – 20 December 2007
Women and Social Development	Susana Pinilla	20 December 2007 – 14 October 2008
Women and Social Development	Carmen Vildoso	14 October 2008 – 11 June 2009
Women and Social Development	Nidia Vílchez	11 June 2009 – 14 September 2010
Women and Social Development	Virginia Borra	14 September 2010 – 28 July 2011
Economy and Finance	Luis Carranza	28 July 2006 – 14 July 2008
Economy and Finance	Luis Valdivieso Montano	14 July 2008 – 19 January 2009
Economy and Finance	Luis Carranza	19 January 2009 – 22 December 2009
Economy and Finance	Mercedes Aráoz	22 December 2009 – 14 September 2010
Economy and Finance	Ismael Benavides Ferreyros	14 September 2010 – 28 July 2011
Transportation and Communications	Verónica Zavala Lombardi	28 July 2006 – 29 November 2008
Transportation and Communications	Enrique Javier Cornejo Ramirez	29 November 2008 – 28 July 2011
Housing, Construction and Sanitation	Hernán Garrido Lecca	28 July 2006 – 20 December 2007
Housing, Construction and Sanitation	Enrique Javier Cornejo Ramirez	20 December 2007 – 29 November 2008
Housing, Construction and Sanitation	Nidia Vílchez Yucra	29 November 2008 – 11 June 2009
Housing, Construction and Sanitation	Francis Allison	11 June 2009 – 29 September 2009
Housing, Construction and Sanitation	Juan Sarmiento Soto	29 September 2009 – 28 July 2011
Foreign Commerce and Tourism	Mercedes Aráoz	28 July 2006 – 11 July 2009
Foreign Commerce and Tourism	Martín Pérez	11 July 2009 – 12 September 2010
Foreign Commerce and Tourism	Eduardo Ferreyros Küppers	14 September 2010 – 28 July 2011
Production	Rafael Rey	28 July 2006 – 14 October 2008
Production	Elena Conterno	14 October 2008 – 11 July 2009
Production	Mercedes Aráoz	11 July 2009 – 22 December 2009
Production	José Nicanor González Quijano	22 December 2009 – 12 September 2010
Production	Jorge Villasante Araníbar	14 September 2010 – 13 May 2011
Production	Luis Nava Guibert	13 May 2011 – 28 July 2011
Health	Carlos Vallejos Sologuren	28 July 2006 – 20 December 2007
Health	Hernán Garrido Lecca	20 December 2007 – 14 October 2008
Health	Oscar Ugarte Ubillús	14 October 2008 – 28 July 2011
Energy and Mines	Juan Valdivia Romero	28 July 2006 – 14 October 2008
Energy and Mines	Pedro Sánchez Gamarra	14 October 2008 – 28 July 2011
Education	José Antonio Chang	28 July 2006 – 19 March 2011
Education	Víctor Raul Díaz Chávez	19 March 2011 – 28 July 2011
Interior	Pilar Mazzetti Soler	28 July 2006 – 26 February 2007
Interior	Luis Alva Castro	26 February 2007 – 14 October 2008
Interior	Remigio Hernani Meloni	14 October 2008 – 19 February 2009
Interior	Mercedes Cabanillas	19 February 2009 – 11 July 2009
Interior	Octavio Salazar Miranda	11 July 2009 – 14 September 2010
Interior	Fernando Barrios Ipenza	14 September 2010 – 22 November 2010
Interior	Miguel Angel Hidalgo Medina	23 November 2010 – 28 July 2011
Justice	María Zavala Valladares	28 July 2006 – 20 December 2007
Justice	Rosario Fernández	20 December 2007 – 11 July 2009
Justice	Aurelio Pastor	11 July 2009 – 16 March 2010
Justice	Víctor García Toma	18 March 2010 – 12 September 2010
Justice	Rosario Fernández	14 September 2010 – 28 July 2011
Environment	Antonio Brack Egg	16 May 2008 – 28 July 2011
Culture	Juan Ossio Acuña	4 September 2010 – 28 July 2011

Political offices
Preceded by Presidency of Alejandro Toledo	President of Peru; 28 July 2006 – 28 July 2011	Succeeded by Presidency of Ollanta Humala
