= Javier Barreda =

Peruvian sociologist, writer, and public administrator (1966–2019)

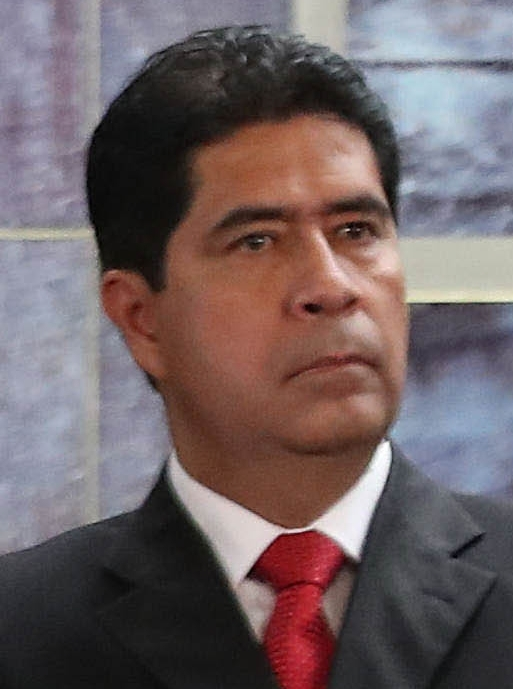

Minister of Labour and Employment Promotion
- In office January 9, 2018 – April 2, 2018
- President: Pedro Pablo Kuczynski
- Prime Minister: Mercedes Aráoz Fernández
- Preceded by: Alfonso Grados Carraro
- Succeeded by: Christian Sánchez Reyes

Deputy Minister of Promotion of Employment and Labour Capacitation
- In office October 22, 2008 – July 28, 2011
- President: Alan García
- Prime Minister: Yehude Simon; Javier Velásquez; José Antonio Chang; Rosario Fernández
- Minister: Jorge Villasante; Manuela García Cochagne
- Preceded by: Ana Teresa Revilla
- Succeeded by: Edgar Quispe Ramón

Deputy Minister of Social Development
- In office January 8, 2008 – October 21, 2008
- President: Alan García
- Prime Minister: Jorge Del Castillo
- Minister: Susana Pinilla; Carmen Vildoso
- Preceded by: Víctor Torres Cornejo
- Succeeded by: Aura Elisa Quiñones Li

Deputy Minister of Promotion of Employment and Micro and Small Business
- In office August 11, 2006 – January 8, 2008
- President: Alan García
- Prime Minister: Jorge Del Castillo
- Minister: Susana Pinilla; Mario Pasco Cosmópolis
- Preceded by: Walter Gago Rodríguez
- Succeeded by: Ana Teresa Revilla

Personal details
- Born: 13 December 1966 Lima, Peru
- Died: 3 June 2019 (aged 52) Lima, Peru
- Cause of death: Myocardial infarction
- Party: Peruvian Aprista Party (until January 2018)
- Spouse: Martha Joo
- Children: 2
- Education: Pontifical Catholic University of Peru (BA)
- Occupation: Sociologist

Javier Alberto Barreda Jara (13 December 1966 – 3 June 2019) was a Peruvian sociologist, writer and public administrator. Born in Lima, he was educated at Cayetano Heredia University and Pontifical Catholic University of Peru. He served as the Minister of Labour and Promotion of Employment for three months, from January to April 2018.

== Early life and education ==
Javier Barreda obtained his high school studies at the Emblematic Educational Institution of Our Lady of Guadalupe in Lima.

He has a degree in sociology from the Pontifical Catholic University of Peru (PUCP) and a master's degree in Project Management and Social Programs from the Cayetano Heredia University.

== Political career ==
He was advisor in the Congress of the Republic on issues of Budget of the Republic, consumer protection, youth policies, among other topics. Speaker on topics of social development and social programs, employment policies, entrepreneurship, participation and youth.

He was a columnist for several newspapers in the country and published several essays on development and political analysis. All your opinion articles can be seen in the blog Búfalo de Pradera, on the portal La Mula.

He was a professor at the Faculty of Social Sciences of the Universidad Nacional Federico Villarreal. He was professor of the course of National Reality of the Universidad de San Martín de Porres. Likewise, he taught in the Leadership Program for the Transformation of CAF – Development Bank of Latin America and the Caribbean and the Government Institute of the San Martín de Porres University.

From 2006 to 2011, he was Vice Minister of Employment Promotion of the Ministry of Labour.

He was married to Martha Joo and had 2 children.

=== Minister of Labour and Promotion of Employment ===
On January 9, 2018, he was sworn in as Minister of Labour and Promotion of Employment, convened by President Pedro Pablo Kuczynski in the so-called "Cabinet of Reconciliation". Its management reactivated the National Labour Council, an area of agreement between workers and employers, and put forward the debate on the increase of the minimum wage in Peru. In the context of the resignation of Kuczynski, and as the last decision taken before his departure, Barreda and the president signed Supreme Decree 044 -2018-Trabajo that increases the minimum wage of Peruvian workers from 850 soles to 930 soles, a measure that It was criticized by the business sector and backed by the vast majority of Peruvians. Sustaining his decision as a former minister, Javier Barreda published articles in Peruvian newspapers sustaining the benefit of the increase.

== Death ==
Barreda Jara died of a heart attack on 3 June 2019 in Lima, at the age of 52.

== Works ==
- 1987: Los límites de la voluntad política (Mitin Editores, Lima, 2012).
- Contra Historia del Perú, ensayos de historia política peruana (Mitin Editores, 2012). Co-author
