= Luis Miguel Castilla =

Peruvian economist and politician

Luis Miguel Castilla Rubio
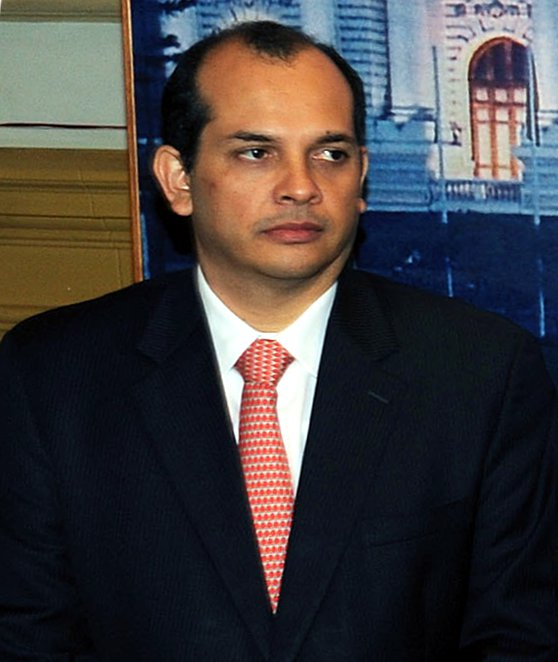

Ambassador of Peru to the United States
- In office January 6, 2015 – July 2016
- President: Ollanta Humala
- Preceded by: Harold Forsyth
- Succeeded by: Carlos Jose Pareja Rios

Minister of Economy and Finance
- In office 28 July 2011 – 14 September 2014
- President: Ollanta Humala
- Preceded by: Ismael Benavides
- Succeeded by: Alonso Segura Vasi

Deputy Minister of Finance
- In office 28 January 2010 – 16 July 2011
- President: Alan García
- Preceded by: José Arista
- Succeeded by: Fernando Toledo Arburúa

Personal details
- Born: 31 October 1968 (age 57) Lima, Peru
- Party: Independent
- Education: Johns Hopkins University; McGill University

Luis Miguel Castilla Rubio is a Peruvian economist and politician. He was the Minister of Economy and Finance of Peru, serving under President Ollanta Humala.

Educated in North America, and bilingual in Spanish and English, Miguel Castilla holds a B.A. with Honors in Economics and Business Administration from the McGill University in Montreal, Canada, a Master and a Ph.D. in Economics from the Johns Hopkins University in Baltimore, Maryland, and has taken a course in the Global Crisis and Financial Reform Program at Harvard University. He has held the positions of consultant to the World Bank vice president for North Africa and the Middle East, adviser to the executive chair of the Development Bank of Latin America and the Caribbean (CAF), and director of the Bank of the Nation of Peru. Castilla is also a member of the Inter-American Dialogue. He has also been a lecturer at the Johns Hopkins University and the University of the Pacific in Lima.

In the administration of President Alan García, Castilla has served as deputy minister of Finance under minister Mercedes Aráoz from January 2010 to July 2011. On 28 July 2011, newly elected President Ollanta Humala appointed him as Minister of Economy and Finance. The choice of Castilla – who is characterised as an orthodox pro-market economist – was estimated as a sign for Humala's intention to pursue a reasonable and moderate economic policy and to remove the fears of a radical shift to the left. On September 14, 2014, he resigned after spending three years in it, leaving economist Alonso Segura as his successor.

On January 6, 2015, he was appointed Extraordinary and Plenipotentiary Ambassador of Peru to the United States. He held the position until July 2016.

In 2017, he was appointed Manager of the Office of Strategic Planning and Development Effectiveness of the Inter-American Development Bank based in Washington, D.C.

Castilla says that Sovereign Wealth Funds are a new source of funding.

Preceded by Ismael Benavides	Minister of Economy and Finance of Peru; July 28, 2011 – Sep 14, 2014	Succeeded by Alonso Segura Vasi
