= Elena Conterno =

Peruvian economist and politician

Elena Aída Conterno Martinelli
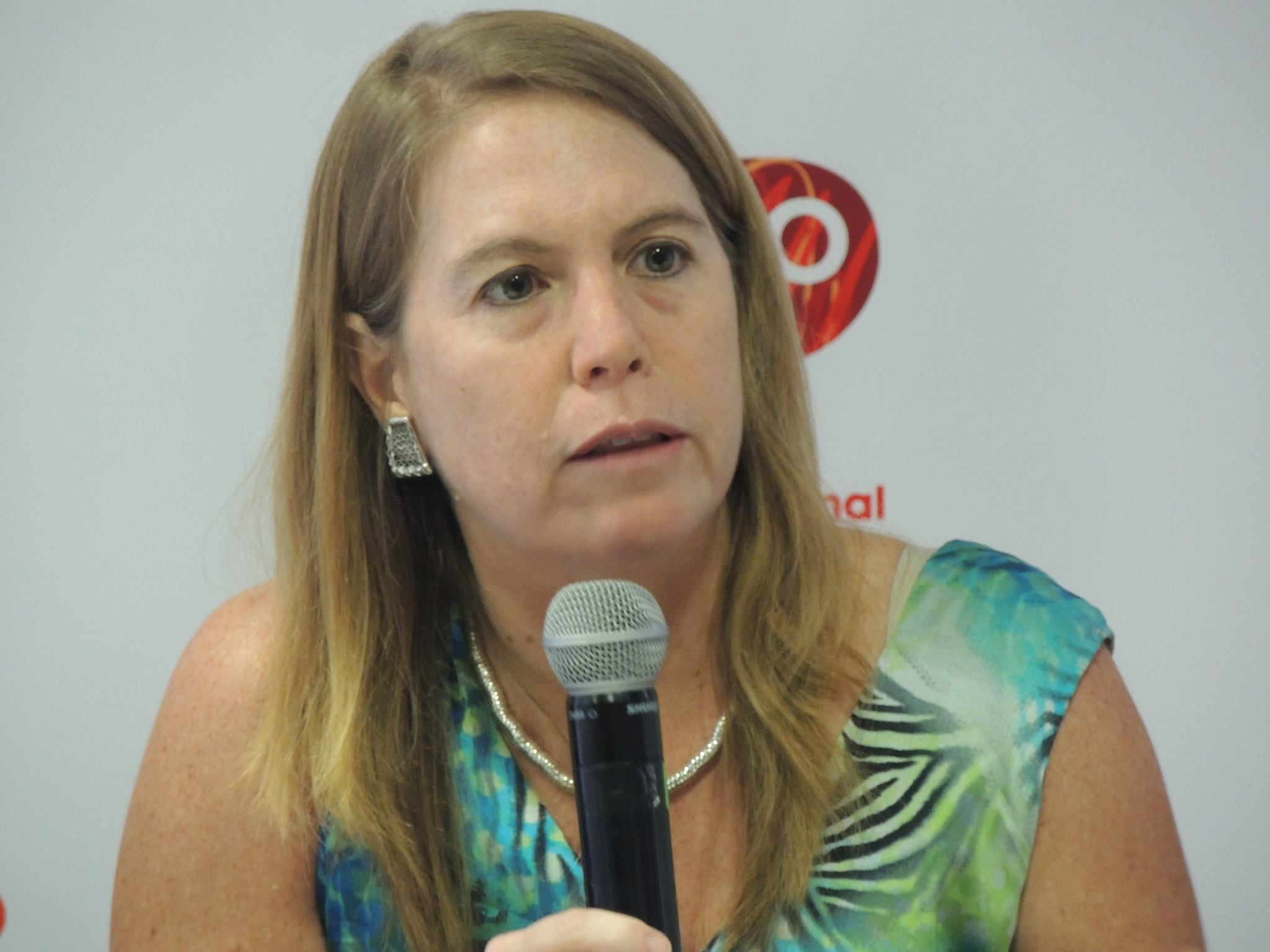
- Conterno in February 2016

Minister of Production of Peru
- In office October 14, 2008 – July 11, 2009
- President: Alan García Pérez
- Preceded by: Rafael Rey Rey
- Succeeded by: Mercedes Aráoz Fernández

Personal details
- Born: December 12, 1969 (age 56) Peru
- Spouse: Jorge Enrique Morales Frías
- Children: Alejandra Morales Conterno, Jorge Ignacio Morales Conterno
- Education: University of the Pacific
- Occupation: Economist

Elena Aída Conterno Martinelli (December 12, 1969) is a Peruvian economist. Since March 2019, she has served as president of the Peruvian Institute of Business Action (IPAE).

She was Minister of Production of Peru from October 2008 to July 2009, during the second presidency of Alan García Pérez and president of the National Fisheries Society from May 2013 to February 2019.

== Biography ==
She studied at the Colegio Villa María in the city of Lima.

She graduated in Economics from the Universidad del Pacífico. She has a master's degree in Public Administration from Harvard University's John F. Kennedy School of Government. She has specialized in public policy, public management, reform and decentralization of the State.

She held executive and advisory positions in public institutions such as the Presidency of the Council of Ministers of Peru, the Ministry of Economy and Finance of Peru, the Ministry of Transport and Communications of Peru, among others.

She has also been a board member of state entities such as Fondo Mi Vivienda, COFIDE, and the Cooperation Fund for Social Development (FONCODES), as well as a consultant for USAID, World Bank, IDB and GTZ.

From 2003 to 2007 she was the area coordinator of the USAID-Pro Decentralization Project.

From June 2010 to May 2013, she was head of the USAID-Facilitating Trade Project, an international cooperation project of the United States in support of Peru and other Andean countries in the development of capacities for trade.

On May 14, 2013, she was elected president of the National Fisheries Society (SNP) for the period 2013-2015.

Conterno is a member of the board of directors of Scotiabank Peru, Profuturo AFP, and the Peruvian University of Applied Sciences. She has also been a member of the board of CARE Peru.

She has also been president of the organizing committee of the 2015 Annual Conference of Executives (CADE), an event in which the main candidates for the presidency of Peru presented their plans for the 2016 general elections.

In 2019 she was elected as president of the IPAE.

== Minister of Production ==
On October 14, 2008, she was sworn in as Minister of Production during the second presidency of Alan García, replacing Rafael Rey Rey.

During her management, Ministerial Resolution 100-2009-PRODUCE was issued, which established that only artisanal vessels registered in the Regional Production Directorates (DIREPRO) could extract anchovy for direct human consumption.
