= Luis Carranza (economist) =

Peruvian economist, banker and academic (born 1966)

Luis Carranza Ugarte
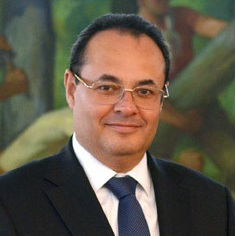

Minister of Economy and Finance
- In office January 19, 2009 – December 22, 2009
- President: Alan García
- Prime Minister: Yehude Simon; Javier Velásquez
- Preceded by: Luis Valdivieso Montano
- Succeeded by: Mercedes Aráoz
- In office July 28, 2006 – July 14, 2008
- President: Alan García
- Prime Minister: Jorge Del Castillo
- Preceded by: Fernando Zavala
- Succeeded by: Luis Valdivieso Montano

Deputy Minister of Finance
- In office August 22, 2004 – August 17, 2005
- President: Alejandro Toledo
- Prime Minister: Carlos Ferrero
- Minister: Pedro Pablo Kuczynski
- Preceded by: Kurt Burneo
- Succeeded by: Waldo Mendoza Bellido

Member of the Central Reserve Bank of Peru Board of Directors
- In office March 2, 2004 – January 25, 2006
- Appointed by: Alejandro Toledo

Personal details
- Born: 21 December 1966 (age 59) Lima, Peru
- Party: Independent
- Education: Pontifical Catholic University of Peru (BA); University of Minnesota (MA, PhD)
- Occupation: Economist; Banker

Luis Julián Martín Carranza Ugarte (born December 21, 1966) is a Peruvian economist, banker and academic. He served as Minister of Economy and Finance of Peru in the second presidency of Alan García, from July 2006 to July 2008 and from January to December 2009. During his first tenure, he championed several structural economic reforms that proved extremely successful. Peru achieved their highest continued average growth rates in recent history (8% average), the FTA with the USA was signed, technology and productivity gains in the country were the highest ever in recorded Peruvian history (40% yearly increments in capital investment), and poverty dropped dramatically (from 52% to 34% of total population). He was re-appointed in January 2009, during the Great Recession. Before being appointed Minister, Carranza was BBVA chief economist for Latin American and emerging markets.

== Education ==
- PhD in economics, University of Minnesota
- MA in economics, University of Minnesota
- Licenciature in Economics, Pontificia Universidad Católica del Perú
- BA in economics, Pontificia Universidad Católica del Perú

== Other activities ==
- Visiting professor, Master in Economics and Finance program, Faculty of Economic and Business Sciences, University of Navarra
- Consultant, Inter-American Development Bank

== Past Public Service ==
- Member, Board of Directors, Central Reserve Bank of Peru
- Deputy Minister of Finance, Government of Peru
