= Luis Nava Guibert =

Peruvian lawyer and politician

Minister of Production
- In office May 14, 2011 – July 28, 2011
- Preceded by: Jorge Villasante Araníbar
- Succeeded by: Kurt Burneo

General Secretary of the Presidency
- In office July 28, 2006 – May 13, 2011
- President: Alan García
- Preceded by: Luis Chuquihuara Chil
- Succeeded by: Rubén Ricardo Neyra Lencinas (Acting)

Personal details
- Born: March 19, 1946 (age 80) Ascope, La Libertad, Peru
- Party: Peruvian Aprista Party
- Children: 3
- Education: Universidad Nacional Federico Villarreal (LLB); Universidad de San Martín de Porres (LLM)

Luis José Nava Guibert (born March 19, 1946) is a Peruvian lawyer and politician. He served as Secretary General of the Presidency, from July 2006 to May 2011; and Minister of Production, from May to July 2011, during the second presidency of Alan García.

Currently, Nava serves 36-month preventive prison sentence, while the Odebrecht case proceedings are taken into account by the Peruvian Judiciary.

== Biography ==
Nava is an attorney holding a law degree Universidad Nacional Federico Villarreal, with graduate studies at the Universidad de San Martín de Porres, specializing in labor law.

Under Alan García's first administration, he was appointed chairman of the Board of Directors of Mutual Perú, which dissolved at the end of the term. He was served prison sentence for almost a year in 1993, accused of fraud, against public faith and unlawful appropriation. He would be acquitted by the Peruvian Judiciary in 1994.

He ran unsuccessfully for a seat in the Peruvian Congress in the 2000 Peruvian general election with the Peruvian Aprista Party. He served as legislative staffer in the Peruvian Congress, from January 1, 2001 to July 26, 2006.

Nava was a senior partner at «Nava & Huesa: Attorneys and Associates», until 2004, when he transferred his shares to his son Luis Nava Mendiola, who in mid-2006 became the majority partner, with 99% of shares. Likewise, in 1995, he founded the transportation company Don Reyna, of which he was chairman until July 25, 2006, when he transferred it to his children and brother.

In the second presidency of Alan García, Nava was appointed Secretary General of the Presidency of the Republic, a position akin to a Government Chief of Staff. He served in the position throughout almost the entire administration, until 14 May 2011, when he was appointed Minister of Production for the remainder of the term, replacing Jorge Villasante Araníbar.

In the 2011 elections, he unsuccessfully ran for a seat in the Andean Parliament with the Peruvian Aprista Party.

The investigative committee formed in Congress to investigate the alleged irregularities of the second García administration, said in a report, an alleged imbalance in their accounts (that is, a difference between their justified income and their expenses). Nava indicated in due course to the media that the aforementioned report was prepared in violation of his constitutional rights with erroneous information and without conforming to the truth, and that there was no imbalance. The prosecution agreed with the decision of July 2, 2018, ordering the filing of the investigation, indicating that the commission's report contained gross errors.

== Controversies ==
Cited before the Lava Jato Commission in Congress, Nava acknowledged that the Nava & Huesa Law Firm and the Transportes Don Reyna company had commercial relations with Odebrecht. It is known that Transportes Don Reyna, whose manager since 2006 was his son José Antonio, received US$18 million for services rendered to Odebrecht, as a contractor for works such as the Interoceánica del Sur highway and Transvase Olmos.

In April 2019, the prosecutor of the Lava Jato Case, José Domingo Pérez, decided to expand the investigation of the case of Line 1 of the Lima Metro, including both Nava and his son José Antonio Nava Mendiola, investigated in the alleged money laundering offense. According to the investigation, Nava Guibert have received US$4 million from Box 2 of the Odebrecht company. Part of that money, according to documents published by IDL Reporters, would have been transferred to the account of Miguel Atala, former vice president of Petroperú, that was discovered in the Banca Privada d'Andorra. Her son, José Antonio Nava Mendiola, manager of Transportes Don Reyna, also reportedly received almost half a million dollars from Odebrecht. This information was provided by the same company Odebrecht, after doing a search on their computer system, in which those involved were given key names (codenames): Luis Nava's was CHALAN, and his son's was BANDIDO. The prosecution's thesis pointed out that both would be figureheads for someone in a higher position, who would be none other than president Alan García himself. The prosecution requested both of them to be prevented from leaving the country for 18 months (April 10, 2019), which was granted by the judge. In his defense, Nava strongly denied having received money from Odebrecht and threatened to sue the journalists who published the investigation. Then he went into a clinic, citing heart problems. As for her son, he left the country for the United States, on April 10, 2019, the same day that the prosecution requested his impediment to leave the country. According to his father, he did it for health reasons.

On April 16, 2019, the preliminary detention was ordered for ten days for Luis Nava and his son. In the same court order was included former president Alan García, who would commit suicide the following morning, on April 17, 2019. Luis Nava would continue in the clinic under police custody.

His son, who was still in the United States, tried to transfer all his accounts from Peru to an account opened in the northern country, as revealed by the prosecutor Rafael Vela Barba. The Financial Intelligence Unit (UIF), at the request of the prosecution, froze all the Nava accounts.

Soon after, the prosecution announced that José Antonio Nava Mendiola, like Miguel Atala and his son Samir Atala, had accepted the sincere confession. José Antonio Nava, who was in Miami, told prosecutors of the Lava Jato case, that on several occasions, that Jorge Barata himself (Odebrecht representative in Peru) asked him to bring briefcases to his father, which he never opened, but who presumed they kept money. In other occasions, he simply took Barata to his father's house to leave the briefcases. At one point, his father confirmed that it was Odebrecht money.

Based on his confession, José Antonio Nava Mendiola changed his legal situation for that of restricted appearance, and returned to Peru on May 7, 2019. Luis Nava was given preventive detention for 36 months, being admitted to the Castro Castro Prison on April 30, 2019.
