= Carmen Vildoso =

Peruvian sociologist and academic

Minister of Women and Social Development
- In office 14 October 2008 – 11 June 2009
- President: Alan García
- Prime Minister: Yehude Simon
- Preceded by: Susana Pinilla
- Succeeded by: Nidia Vílchez

Deputy Minister of Promotion of Employment and Micro and Small Business
- In office 10 August 2001 – 15 July 2003
- President: Alejandro Toledo
- Prime Minister: Roberto Dañino; Luis Solari; Beatriz Merino
- Minister: Fernando Villarán de la Puente; Jesús Alvarado Hidalgo
- Preceded by: Mario Arróspide Medina (as Deputy Minister of Social Promotion)
- Succeeded by: Alejandro Jiménez Morales

Personal details
- Born: 3 March 1956 (age 70) Lima, Peru
- Party: Independent
- Education: National University of San Marcos (BA); Pontifical Catholic University of Peru (MA)
- Profession: Sociologist

Carmen Aurora Marcela Vildoso Chirinos (born March 3, 1956) is a Peruvian sociologist and academic. She served in Alan García's second administration, in the position of Minister of Women and Social Development, from October 2008 to June 2009.

Previously, she served as Deputy Minister of Promotion of Employment and Micro and Small Business at the Ministry of Labour and Promotion of Employment from August 2001 to July 2003 during Alejandro Toledo's administration.

== Early life and education ==
Carmen Vildoso was born in Lima, Peru on March 3, 1956. Her mother, Aurora Chirinos Pizarro, is a renowned biologist and zoologist, specializing in the investigation of fishery biology in the Sea Institute of Peru and the defunct Ministry of Fishing. Her father is Abelardo Vildoso Baca, who served as Director-General of Administration of the Ministry of Fishing during the 1980s.

Upon finishing her elementary and high school education at the San Antonio Women's School, she enrolled in the National University of San Marcos, where she graduated with a bachelor's degree in sociology. She attained a master's degree in sociology at the Pontifical Catholic University of Peru.

== Career ==
At the start of Alejandro Toledo's administration, Vildoso was appointed Deputy Minister of Promotion of Employment and Micro and Small Business. She resigned in July 2003.

Vildoso was appointed to the Ministry of Women and Social Development as part of a government reshuffle following Jorge Del Castillo's cabinet resignation on October 10, 2008. She was sworn on October 14 under Yehude Simon's cabinet leadership. She had been serving as Technical Secretary of the National Accord since 2004.

In her brief tenure as Minister, she was characterized as a low profile public servant who constantly expressed discrepancies regarding irregular situations involving the government, as she did based on her stance with the Amazon political crisis, which led her to resignation on June 8, 2009. She was succeeded in the Ministry by Peruvian Aprista Party congresswoman Nidia Vílchez, who was switched from the Housing Ministry to Women and Social Development.
