= Centro de Investigación de la Universidad del Pacífico =

Peruvian research unit

Centro de Investigación de la Universidad del Pacífico, or CIUP, as it is known in Peru, is an interdepartamental and interdisciplinary research unit through which the Universidad del Pacífico undertakes and disseminates research in Peru.

== Strategic approaches ==
As a think tank, its mission is to contribute to the development and democratisation of Peru, in an increasingly diverse and interconnected world. CIUP aims to achieve this mission through the production of knowledge about current national and international issues, the generation of proposals of change, and influence on debates and public policies. Additionally, it aims to develop the future generation of public and private entrepreneurs and professionals.

In 2010, CIUP launched Agenda 2011 to influence the Peruvian 2011 presidential race with new evidence on key policy areas.

== Areas of focus ==
CIUP works across six focus areas:

1. Economic growth and development
2. Regulation and competitivity
3. Poverty and social policies
4. Natural resources and the environment
5. International relations
6. Business management and corporate social responsibility

== Present and past directors ==
- Its current director is Cynthia Sanborn
- Felipe Portocarrero

== Notable alumni and researchers ==
- Mercedes Aráoz – former Minister of finance, trade and production; also former presidential candidate
- Enrique Vasquez – former president of PRONAA
- Julio Velarde – president of the Central Bank of Peru

== See also ==
Think tanks
