= Kurt Burneo =

Peruvian economist and politician

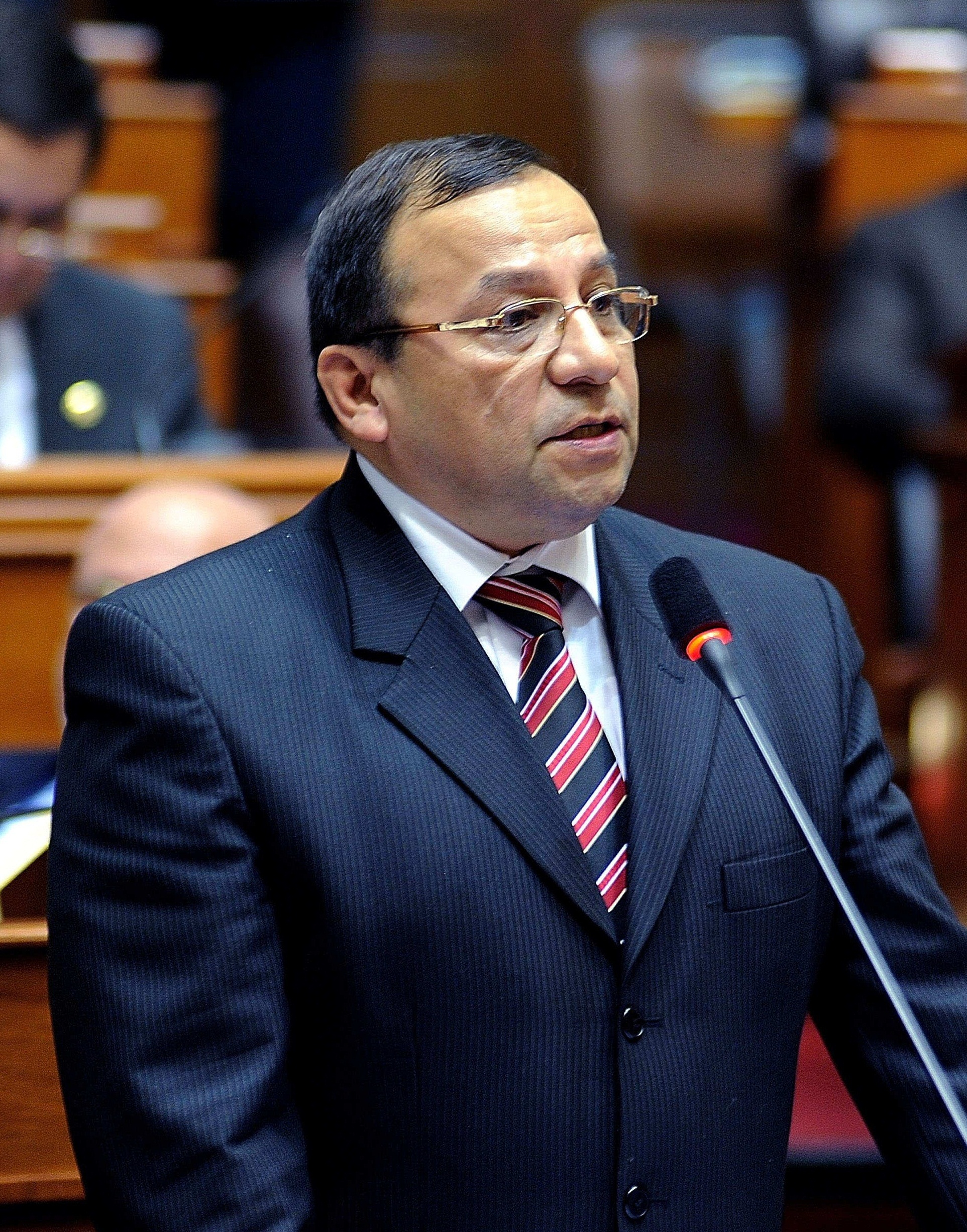
- Burneo in 2011

Minister of Economy and Finance
- In office 5 August 2022 – 7 December 2022
- President: Pedro Castillo
- Prime Minister: Aníbal Torres
- Preceded by: Óscar Graham
- Succeeded by: Alex Contreras

Minister of Production
- In office 28 July 2011 – 10 December 2011
- President: Ollanta Humala
- Prime Minister: Salomon Lerner
- Preceded by: Luis Nava Guibert
- Succeeded by: José Antonio Urquizo

Deputy Minister of Finance
- In office 16 August 2001 – 22 August 2004
- President: Alejandro Toledo
- Prime Minister: Roberto Dañino; Luis Solari; Beatriz Merino; Carlos Ferrero
- Preceded by: Alfredo Jalilie
- Succeeded by: Luis Carranza

Personal details
- Born: 26 February 1961 (age 65) Lima, Peru

Kurt Johnny Burneo Farfán (born 26 February 1961) is a Peruvian economist and politician. He served as minister of Economy and Finance under the presidency of Pedro Castillo.

== Early life ==
Burneo was born in Lima, Peru on 26 February 1961. He studied economics at the National University of San Marcos, then was grant holder at the University of São Paulo and he earned an Economics master's degree at the Pontifical Catholic University of Peru. He earned a doctorate in Business Administration at the ESADE business school of the Ramon Llull University in Barcelona, Spain.

== Political career ==
=== Toledo government ===
During the government of Alejandro Toledo, Burneo was Peru's Deputy Minister of Finance, chairman of the National Bank and director of the Central Reserve Bank of Peru. He has taught at several universities, such as Pontificia Universidad Catolica del Peru, Cayetano Heredia University, Universidad de San Martín de Porres and Universidad Nacional Federico Villarreal. He is currently director of the economics course at the Universidad San Ignacio de Loyola, a position he has held since 2006.

=== 2011 election and Humala government ===
Burneo was head of the economic team of Alejandro Toledo when he was running for the Presidency of the Republic in the general election. He was Finance Vice Minister between August 2001-September 2004, Member of the Board at the Central Bank between September 2001-October 2006 and CEO at The National Bank between August 2001-July 2006. He later became part of the economic team of Ollanta Humala, who was elected President of the Republic in the second round.

When appointed to head the Production Ministry and was in charge to create the Ministry of Development and Social Inclusion, in August 2011, Kurt Burneo said "The idea is to centralise the social programmes. One of the current problems that has led to glaring economic losses is the fact that the social programmes are dispersed". He went on to say that his role would entail the formulation, planning, implementation, evaluation and monitoring of the national and sectoral policy on social development and inclusion.

Burneo resigned as minister due to a cabinet reshuffle on 11 December 2011. He currently is the Alternate Executive Director in the Interamerican Development Bank in Washington DC USA, until July 2014. From August 2014 Burneo was Research and Development Vice President at San Ignacio de Loyola University, he worked in this institution until November 2015. He currently is Researcher and Professor at CENTRUM Catolica Business School.

== Bibliography ==
- El Desafío de la Privatización en el Perú (1993)Edic. CEDAL Lima Peru
- Sistema privado de Pensiones (1994)Edic.CEDAL Lima Peru
- El Desafio del Sistema Privado de Pensiones.(2009). Edic: Congreso de la Republica Lima Peru.
- Bancarización Pública en el Perú: Efectos sobre el creamiento económico regional (2009)
- Economics.(2015)Edit. USIL. Lima Peru
- Principios de Economía (2015 )Edit. USIL. Lima Peru.
- Principios de Economía (2015 )Edit. ECOE, Bogota Colombia.
- Topics in Finance.(2016) Pearson Eds. Forthcoming

°“Fiscal Issues and central Bank. The Case of Perú” (2003 Bank of International Settlements Papers Vol 20. Octubre). °“Corporate Governance Index in Emerging Markets: Peruvian Listed Companies” (Research in Finance, June 2016); °“Emerging markets integration in Latin America -MILA- stock market indicators Chile, Colombia, and Perú” (2015 Journal of Economics, Finance and Administrative Science Vol. 20 Issue 39) °“Unión Andina de Cementos S.A.A. (UNACEM). Capital structure case” (2015 Revista Espacios Vol.36 No.20) °“Corporate governance in emerging markets and its impact on finance performance” (2014 Corporate Ownership & Control Vol.12, Issue 1, 2014) "Gobierno Corporativo en Mercados Emergentes Impacto en la Bolsa de Valores de Lima-BVL" (2016, Journal GCG Georgetown. Forthcoming)
