= Patricio Ricketts =

Peruvian journalist and politician (1924–2024)

Minister of Education
- In office 15 August 1983 – 10 April 1984
- Preceded by: José Benavides Muñoz
- Succeeded by: Valentín Paniagua

Minister of Labour and Social Promotion
- In office 27 July 1983 – 15 August 1983
- Preceded by: Alfonso Grados Bertorini
- Succeeded by: Joaquín Leguía Gálvez

Personal details
- Born: Patricio Ricketts Rey de Castro; 19 May 1924; Arequipa, Peru
- Died: 3 February 2024 (aged 99); Lima, Peru
- Education: National University of San Agustín
- Occupation: Journalist

Patricio Ricketts Rey de Castro (19 May 1924 – 3 February 2024) was a Peruvian journalist and politician. He served as Minister of Labour and Social Promotion from July to August 1983 and Minister of Education from 1983 to 1984.

Ricketts died in Lima on 3 February 2024, at the age of 99.
