= Harold Forsyth =

Peruvian diplomat

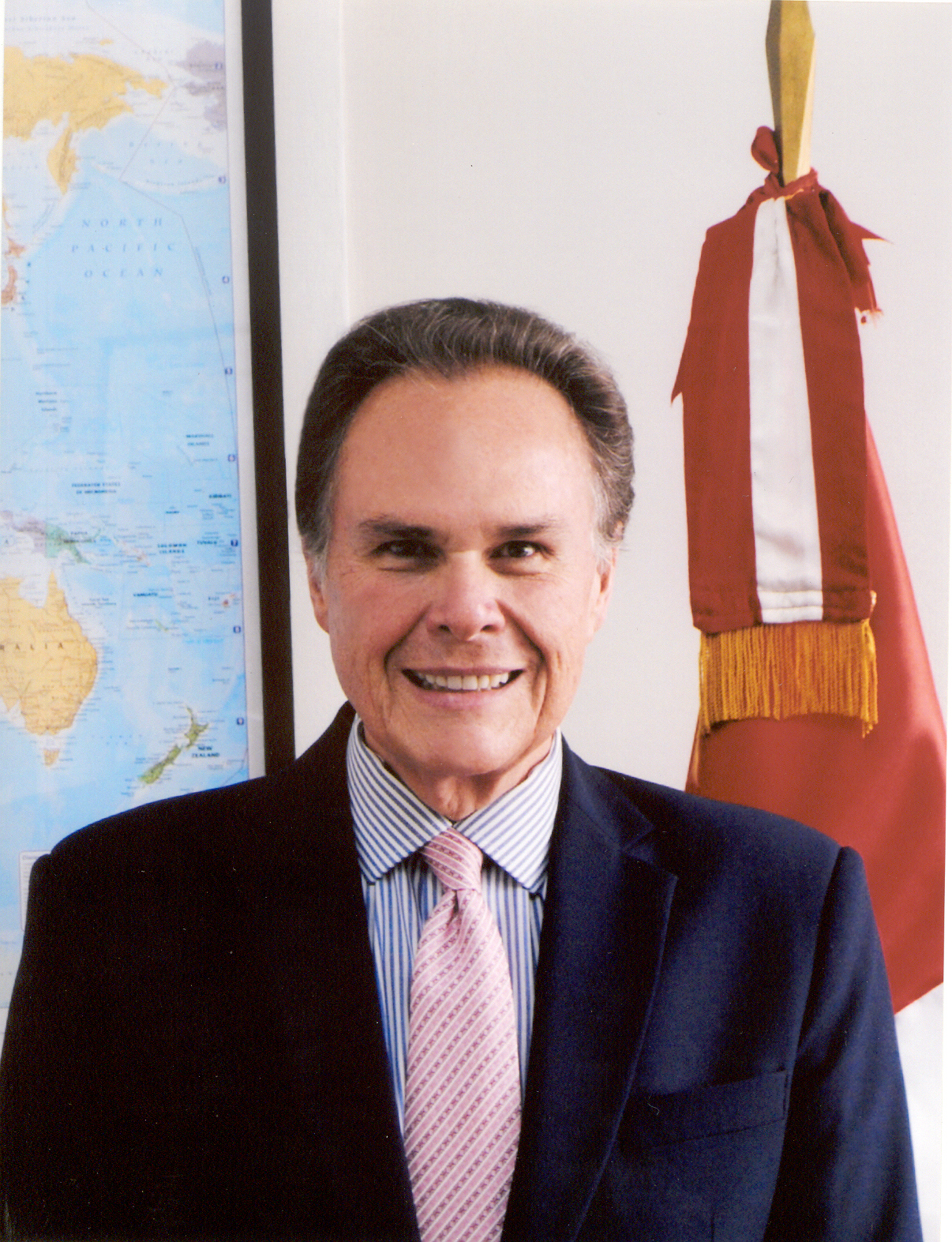
- Forsyth in 2011

25th Permanent Representative of Peru to the Organization of American States
- In office 3 August 2021 – 7 December 2022
- President: Pedro Castillo
- Preceded by: Hugo de Zela Martínez
- Succeeded by: Gustavo Adrianzén (2023)

Ambassador of Peru to the United States
- In office 3 August 2011 – January 2015
- Preceded by: Luis Valdivieso Montano
- Succeeded by: Luis Miguel Castilla

Deputy Minister-Secretary General of Foreign Relations
- In office 16 March 2006 – 28 July 2006
- President: Alejandro Toledo
- Prime Minister: Pedro Pablo Kuczynski
- Minister: Óscar Maúrtua
- Preceded by: Javier Gonzales Terrones
- Succeeded by: Gonzalo Gutiérrez Reinel

Member of Congress
- In office 26 July 1995 – 26 July 2000
- Constituency: National

Personal details
- Born: Harold Winston Forsyth Mejía; 27 May 1951 (age 75) Huanta, Ayacucho, Peru
- Party: Independent (2000–present)
- Other political affiliations: Union for Peru (1995–2000); We are Peru (2000)
- Spouse: María Verónica Sommer Mayer
- Children: 3 (including George)
- Parents: Willy Forsyth Cauvi; Lucciola Mejía de Forsyth
- Education: Pontifical Catholic University of Peru
- Occupation: Politician
- Profession: Diplomat

Harold Winston Forsyth Mejía (born 27 May 1951) is a Peruvian diplomat and former politician who has served as Peru's ambassador to the United States, Italy, Colombia, the People's Republic of China and Japan. From 1995 until 2000, he sat for one term in the Congress of the Republic of Peru.

== Early life and education ==
Harold Forsyth was born to Willy Forsyth and Lucciola Mejia de Forsyth in 1951. He graduated from the Champagnat School in Lima and received a bachelor's degree in journalism at the Pontifical Catholic University of Peru. Forsyth later earned a graduate certificate at the Diplomatic Academy of Peru.

== Career ==
In his early career, Forsyth held a variety of diplomatic postings to Chile, Venezuela, Canada, and Germany, and was seconded as an international observer to elections monitoring missions in Colombia, Mexico, and Guatemala.

=== Political career ===
Forsyth was compelled to resign from the Peruvian foreign service by Alberto Fujimori and, in the 1995 election, he successfully stood for election to Congress, holding his seat for a single, five-year term under the Union for Peru. During this period he also hosted the program "Convocatoria" on CPN Radio.

=== Return to Foreign Service ===
Later returning to the foreign service, Forsyth served as Peruvian ambassador to Colombia from 2001 to 2004, as ambassador to Italy from 2004 to 2006, as ambassador to China from 2009 to 2011, as ambassador to the United States from 2011 to 2014, and, from 2017 to 2021, as ambassador to Japan. Between his postings to Italy and China, Forsyth returned to Peru, where he served as deputy foreign minister.

== Personal life ==
Forsyth is married and has three children, including footballer-politician George Forsyth. Forsyth's wife, María Verónica, is a former Miss Chile.

== Works ==
- Forsyth, Harold (2001). Conversaciones con Javier Pérez de Cuéllar. Lima. ISBN 9972709329. OCLC 52631190.
