= Ministry of Labour and Promotion of Employment =

Government ministry of Peru

Ministry of Labor and Promotion of Employment
- Ministerio de Trabajo y Promoción del Empleo
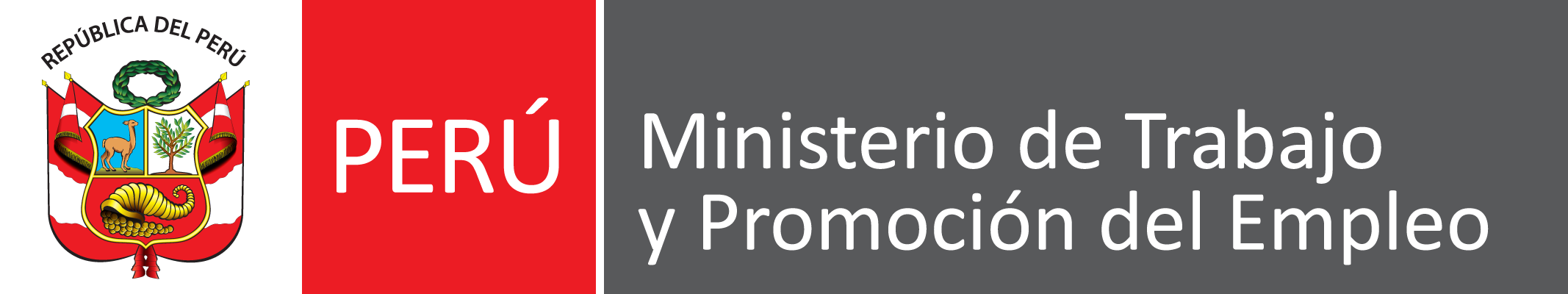

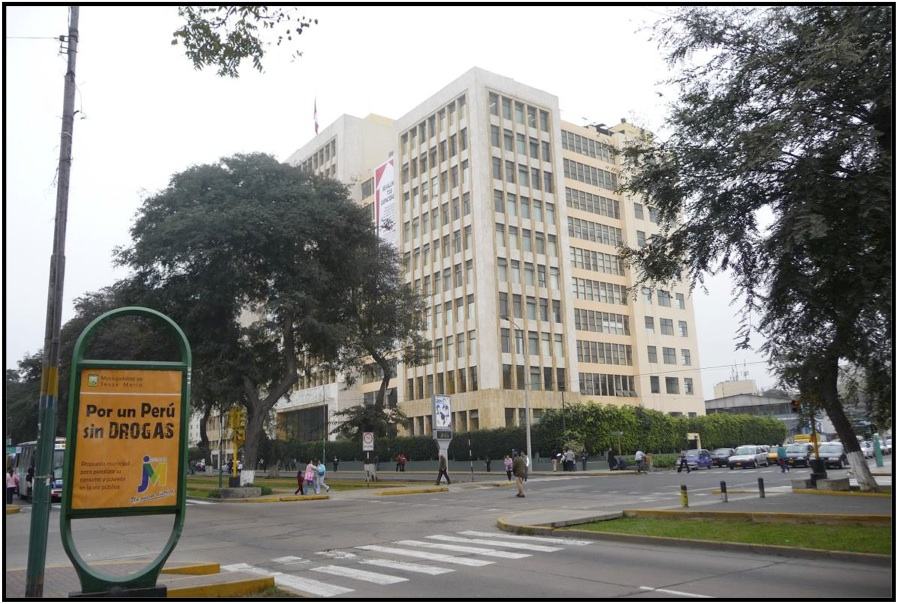

Ministry overview
- Formed: April 30, 1949
- Jurisdiction: Peru
- Headquarters: 655 Salaverry, Lima
- Minister responsible: Daniel Maurate
- Website: www.gob.pe/minedu

The Ministry of Labour and Promotion of Employment (Spanish: Ministerio de Trabajo y Promoción del Empleo; MTPE, also MINTRA) of Peru is the government ministry responsible for matters of labour and promotion of employment. It also promotes social welfare and vocational training, as well as the ensurance of compliance with legal standards and working conditions, in a context of dialogue and consultation between social partners and the state.

As of 6 September 2023, the minister responsible is Daniel Maurate.

== History ==
The ministry has its origins in an office that operated as part of a series of ministries. It was formally created on April 30, 1949, through Law Decree 11009, with the name Ministry of Labour and Indian Affairs (Spanish: Ministerio de Trabajo y Asuntos Indígenas).

From 1969 onwards, the ministry took a number of names according to the offices with which it worked:

- Ministry of Labour and Communities (Spanish: Ministerio de Trabajo y Comunidades): 1966–1969.
- Ministry of Labour (Spanish: Ministerio de Trabajo): 1969–1981.
- Ministry of Labour and Social Promotion (Spanish: Ministerio de Trabajo y Promoción Social): 1981–2002

It ultimately acquired its current name in 2002.

== Organisation ==
- Senior Management
  - Minister of Labour and Employment Promotion
  - Vice Ministry of Labour
    - General Directorate of Labour
    - General Directorate of Fundamental Rights and Occupational Health and Safety
    - General Directorate of Labour Inspection Policies
  - Vice Ministry of Employment Promotion and Labour Training
    - General Directorate of Employment Promotion
    - General Directorate of the National Employment Service
    - General Directorate of Standardization, Formalization for Employment, and Certification of Labour Competencies
  - General Secretariat
    - Regional Directorate of Labour and Employment Promotion of Metropolitan Lima
- Technical Consulting
- Attorney General's Office
- Internal Inspection
- Audit and Special Examinations
- Inspections and Investigations
- EsSalud

Entities administered by the ministry include:

- Superintendencia Nacional de Fiscalización Laboral (SUNAFIL)
- Consejo Nacional de Trabajo y Promoción del Empleo
- Consejo Nacional de Seguridad y Salud en el Trabajo
- Seguro Social de Salud (ESSALUD; 1973–1984), previously the Instituto Peruano de Seguridad Social.

== List of ministers ==
Name	Party	Period	
Name	Party	Term start	Term end
Ministers of Labour and Indian Affairs (1949–1966)
Armando Artola del Pozo	—	May 31, 1949	August 9, 1954
Víctor A. Casagrande Velezmoro	—	August 9, 1954	September 15, 1955
Carlos D'Ugard Murgado	—	September 15, 1955	December 24, 1955
Augusto Romero Lovo	—	December 24, 1955	July 28, 1956
Ricardo Elías Aparicio	—	July 28, 1956	April 4, 1958
Antonio Pinilla Sánchez-Concha	—	April 4, 1958	September 3, 1958
Ricardo Elías Aparicio	—	September 3, 1958	July 18, 1959
Luis Alvarado Garrido	—	July 18, 1959	October 15, 1960
José Luis González Suárez	—	October 15, 1960	November 19, 1961
José Merino Reyna	—	November 19, 1961	July 18, 1962
José Gagliardi Schiaffino	—	July 18, 1962	July 28, 1963
Miguel Ángel Cussianovich Valderrama	Acción Popular	July 28, 1963	July 27, 1964
Frank Griffiths Escardó	Acción Popular	July 27, 1964	September 15, 1965
Ministers of Labour and Communities (1966–1969)
Miguel Dammert Muelle	Acción Popular	September 15, 1965	November 24, 1966
Manuel Velarde Aspíllaga	Acción Popular	November 24, 1966	October 6, 1967
Fernando Calmell del Solar Zúñiga	Acción Popular	October 6, 1967	October 2, 1968
Alfonso Grados Bertorini	Acción Popular	October 2, 1968	October 3, 1968
Rolando Gilardi Rodríguez	—N/a	October 3, 1968	October 4, 1968
Ministers of Labour (1969–1981)
Jorge Chamot Biggs	—	October 4, 1968	September 28, 1970
Pedro Sala Orozco	—	September 28, 1970	November 28, 1974
Dante Poggi Morán	—	November 28, 1974	August 30, 1975
Dante Poggi Morán	—	August 30, 1975	October 20, 1975
Luis Galindo Chapman	—	October 20, 1975	May 16, 1977
Luis Ugarelli Valle	—	May 16, 1977	January 1, 1978
José García-Calderón Koechlin	—	January 1, 1978	July 23, 1979
Javier Elías Vargas	—	July 23, 1979	July 28, 1980
Ministers of Labour and Social Promotion (1981–2002)
Alfonso Grados Bertorini	—	July 28, 1980	July 27, 1983
Patricio Ricketts Rey de Castro	—	July 27, 1983	August 15, 1983
Joaquín Leguía Gálvez	Acción Popular	August 15, 1983	July 28, 1985
Carlos Blancas Bustamante	Democracia Cristiana	July 28, 1985	June 25, 1986
Orestes Rodríguez Campos	APRA	June 25, 1986	September 4, 1989
Wilfredo Chau Villanueva	APRA	September 4, 1989	July 28, 1990
Carlos Torres y Torres Lara	Cambio 90	July 28, 1990	February 15, 1991
Alfonso de los Heros Pérez-Albela	—	February 15, 1991	April 6, 1992
Augusto Antoniolli Vásquez	—	April 6, 1992	July 28, 1995
Sandro Fuentes Acurio	—	July 28, 1995	April 3, 1996
Jorge González Izquierdo	—	April 3, 1996	January 5, 1999
Jorge Mufarech Nemy	—	January 6, 1999	April 16, 1999
Pedro Flores Polo	—	April 16, 1999	July 28, 2000
Edgardo Mosqueira Medina	—	July 29, 2000	November 25, 2000
Jaime Zavala Costa	—	November 25, 2000	July 28, 2001
Ministers of Labour and Promotion of Employment
Fernando Villarán de la Puente	—N/a	July 28, 2001	June 28, 2003
Jesús Alvarado Hidalgo	Perú Posible	June 28, 2003	January 5, 2004
Juan Ramírez Canchari	Perú Posible	January 5, 2004	February 16, 2004
Javier Neves Mujica	—N/a	February 16, 2004	February 25, 2005
Juan Sheput Moore	Perú Posible	February 25, 2005	October 7, 2005
Carlos Almerí Veramendi	Perú Posible	October 7, 2005	July 28, 2006
Susana Pinilla Cisneros	—	July 28, 2006	December 19, 2007
Mario Pasco Cosmópolis	—	December 20, 2007	October 13, 2008
Jorge Villasante Araníbar	APRA	October 14, 2008	July 10, 2009
Manuela García Cochagne	—N/a	July 11, 2009	July 28, 2011
Rudecindo Vega Carreazo	Perú Posible	July 28, 2011	December 11, 2011
José Villena Petrosino	—	December 12, 2011	December 9, 2012
Teresa Laos Cáceres	—	December 10, 2012	February 24, 2014
Ana Jara Velásquez	Gana Perú	February 24, 2014	July 22, 2014
Fredy Otárola Peñaranda	Gana Perú	July 22, 2014	February 17, 2015
Daniel Maurate Romero	—	February 17, 2015	July 28, 2016
Alfonso Grados Carraro	—	July 28, 2016	January 9, 2018
Javier Barreda Jara	APRA	January 9, 2018	April 2, 2018
Christian Sánchez Reyes	—	April 2, 2018	December 7, 2018
Sylvia Cáceres Pizarro	—	December 15, 2018	July 15, 2020
Martín Ruggiero Garzón	—	July 15, 2020	August 6, 2020
Javier Palacios Gallegos	—	August 6, 2020	November 12, 2020
Juan Sheput Moore	—	November 12, 2020	November 18, 2020
Javier Palacios Gallegos	—	November 18, 2020	July 28, 2021
Íber Maraví Olarte	—	July 29, 2021	October 6, 2021
Betssy Chávez Chino	Perú Libre	October 6, 2021	May 29, 2022
Juan Lira Loayza	—N/a	May 29, 2022	August 5, 2022
Alejandro Salas Zegarra	Somos Perú	August 5, 2022	December 7, 2022
Eduardo García Birimisa	—	December 13, 2022	January 12, 2023
Luis Adrianzén Ojeda	—	January 13, 2023	April 23, 2023
Fernando Varela Bohórquez	—	April 23, 2023	September 6, 2023
Daniel Maurate Romero	—	September 6, 2023	October 12, 2025
Oscar Fernandez Caceres	Partido Popular Cristiano	October 14, 2025	May 29, 2026
Freddy José María Solano Gonzáles		May 29, 2026	July 9, 2026
Flavio Cruz Mamani	Perú Libre	July 9, 2026	

== See also ==
- Confederación General de Trabajadores del Perú
