= EsSalud =

Public agency of Peru

Social Health Insurance
- Seguro Social de Salud
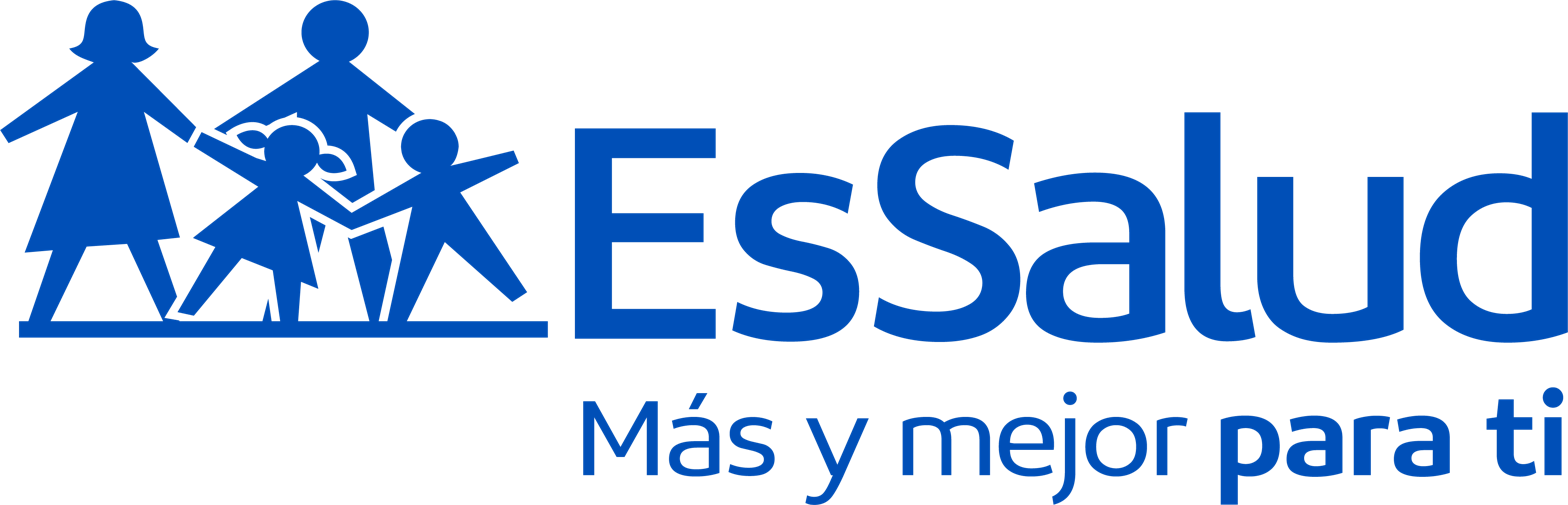

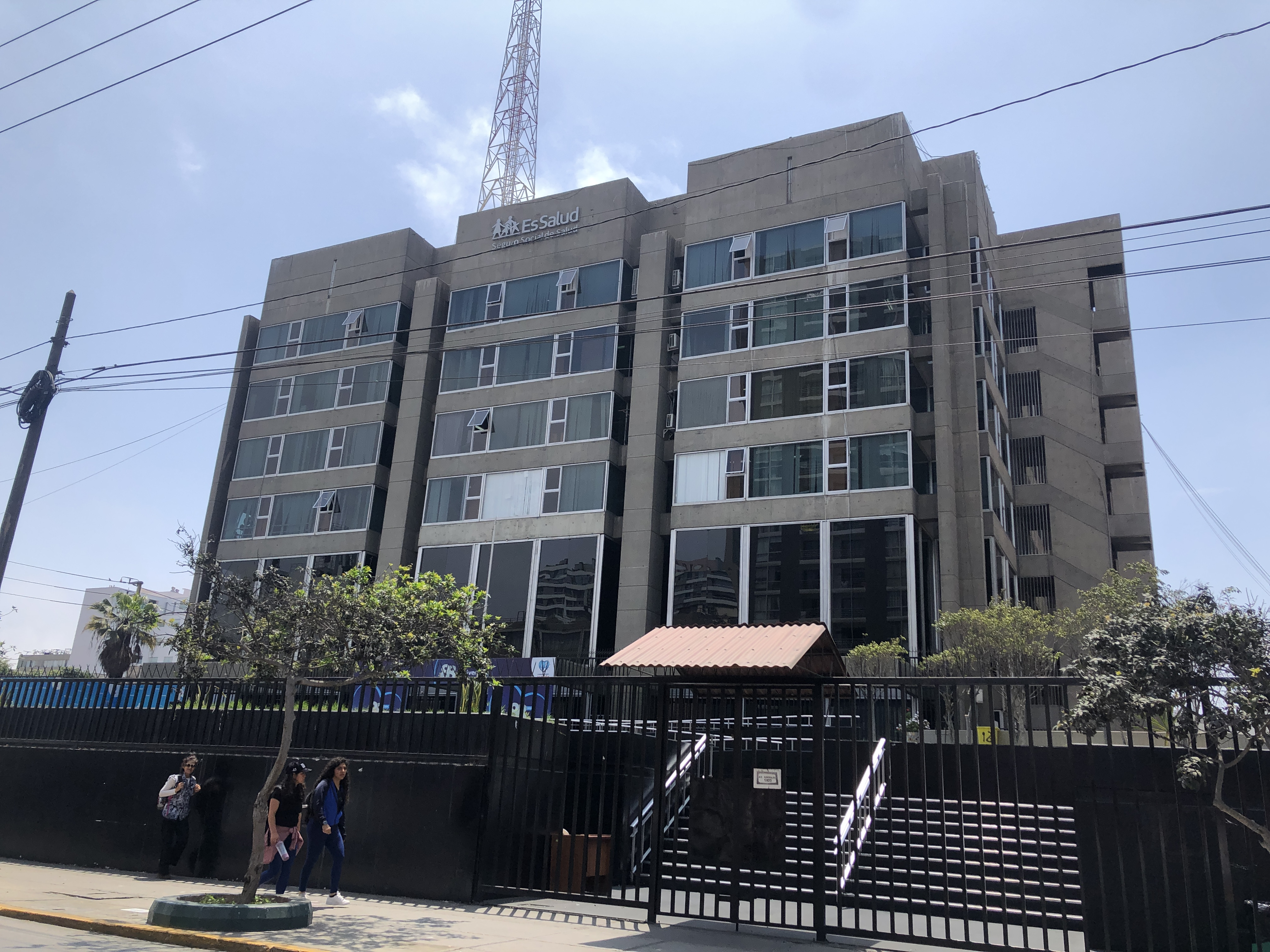

Agency overview
- Formed: August 12, 1936
- Jurisdiction: Peru
- Headquarters: 1402 Arenales, Jesús María District, Lima
- Motto: More and better, for you (Más y mejor para tí)
- Agency executive: Segundo Cecilio Acho Mego, President
- Website: gob.pe/essalud

The Social Health Insurance (Spanish: Seguro Social de Salud; EsSalud), known until 1999 as the Peruvian Social Security Institute (Spanish: Instituto Peruano de Seguridad Social; IPSS), is a government agency of Peru in charge of the country's public social security. Its headquarters are located at Jesús María District, Lima.

== See also ==
- Ministry of Health (Peru)
- Ministry of Labour and Promotion of Employment
