= Susana de la Puente =

Peruvian banker and businesswoman

Susana de la Puente Wiese
- Born: Susana de la Puente Wiese; 1958 (age 67–68); Lima, Peru
- Education: Hult International Business School (Previously Arthur D. Little School of Management) Universidad del Pacífico (Perú)
- Occupation: Banker
- Parent(s): Gonzalo de la Puente y Lavalle & Clotilde Wiese de Osma

Susana María de la Puente Wiese is a Peruvian banker and businesswoman.

== Biography ==
She attended school at Colegio Santa Úrsula, run by the Ursuline Mothers, and Colegio Villa María, run by the Mothers of the Immaculate Heart of Mary.

She studied management at the Universidad del Pacífico, from which she graduated in 1981. She later earned a master's degree in management from the then Arthur D. Little School of Management in Boston.

== Career path ==
In 1984, Susana de la Puente joined JP Morgan in New York City, in Investment banking. Later in 1992 she was appointed senior banker and director of JP Morgan Perú. She was managing director and vice president of JP Morgan Chase for the Andean Region, Central America and the Caribbean and then vice-chairman for Latin America until 2007.

In May 2007, De la Puente joined the advisory board of the Hypatia Capital Group in New York City.

In 2010, she joined the board of directors of the Wiese Group and the Wiese Foundation. She is also a founding partner and director of Futura Schools, director of the NGO Acción Comunitaria del Perú, director of the NGO CARE and director of Lumni Perú.

Susana de la Puente is an art lover and collector who participates intensively in the London art scene, as well as in biennials and art fairs in Europe and America. She is also a board member of the Museo de Arte de Lima, and the Museo del Barrio in New York. De la Puente manages the B Boutique Hotel in Lima, Peru. This hotel is a house built in 1914 that was converted into an arts-boutique hotel. Each of the 17 rooms at the property houses sculptures, paintings and photographs by contemporary artists from around the world.

Since November 2015, she is director of LUMNI, a social impact company that manages investment funds that invest in the human capital of young people in higher education in Peru, Colombia, Chile, Mexico and the United States. LUMNI funds finance a portion of the student's education expenses and in return the student pays a percentage of his or her labor income for a certain number of years.

Since October 2016, she has been a member of the Advisory Committee of Laboratoria, which offers young women from low-income backgrounds a career in technology that transforms their future. Thanks to her activity, there are more than 2500 young women graduates since 2015 and today more than 85% of her students have been placed as web developers, almost tripling their income, improving their lives and generating a positive impact on their families and communities.

She is president of the board of directors of the Club Empresarial de Lima, member of the Board of Trustees of the Universidad del Pacífico and member of the advisory board of the Universidad Peruana de Ciencias Applicadas.

Previously, she was director of Telefónica del Perú, member of the Advisory Committee to the chairman of the Board of the Inter-American Development Bank (IDB), director of the Peruvian Institute of Business Administration (IPAE), director of OWIT – PERU and director of Pro Mujer-Peru, an NGO dedicated to women-led microfinance in Latin America.

Susana de la Puente is recognized for her role in transforming the Latin American financial landscape. She has been involved in the region's largest transactions, including the privatizations of the 1990s and the mergers and acquisitions of the last 30 years. De la Puente has also contributed to the opening of the capital markets to issuers from the region. She led the first Eurobond issue for a Latin American corporation, Cemex, in 1989, the first Eurobond for Venezuela in 1999, and the first IPO of a Peruvian company on the New York Stock Exchange, among other global capital market transactions.

In July 2017, she was appointed as Ambassador of Peru to the United Kingdom of Great Britain and Northern Ireland. In October of the same year, she was appointed as permanent representative of Peru to the International Maritime Organization.

In 2018, Susana de la Puente made her position available to the Ministry of Foreign Affairs as Ambassador to the United Kingdom and as permanent representative of Peru to the International Maritime Organization.

Susana de la Puente currently resides in London and is dedicated to investing in startup projects.

== Acknowledgments ==
In May 1999, Susana de la Puente was named one of the "50 leaders for the New Millennium" by Time Magazine in the United States. Likewise, Euromoney and Global Finance magazines have considered her as one of the "Top Women in Finance". Poder Magazine and The Economist named her "Best Investment Banker for Latin America" and América Economía named her "One of the 10 Most Powerful Women in Latin America".
