= Javier Neves =

Peruvian politician (1953–2021)

Javier Neves Mujica (Lima, Peru, 1953 – 11 February 2021) was a Peruvian politician who served as Minister of Labour and Promotion of Employment from 2004 to 2005. He died of COVID-19 in Lima during the COVID-19 pandemic in Peru.
