= CADE Ejecutivos =

Business conference in Peru

- Status: Active
- Genre: business, politics
- Frequency: Annually
- Country: Peru
- Most recent: November 16–18, 2021
- Attendance: 1,200+
- Organiser: IPAE
- Website: http://www.cadeejecutivos.com/

The Annual Conference of Executives (CADE or CADE Ejecutivos) is an annual event for Peruvian business leaders, politicians and academics held in order to discuss topics related to business development and public policy. It is organized by the Peruvian Institute of Business Action (IPAE).

== History of the forum ==
=== 1960's ===
The Peruvian Institute of Business Action, a non-profit organization and the organizer of the CADE Ejecutivos forum, was founded in 1959.

In 1961 the first conference of executives was held in Paracas, Ica, which had the title of Greater efficiency, rise of production: Keys to economic and social progress for the country. The event bought together 73 people, including authorities, businessmen and academics. The director of CEPAL, Raúl Prebisch; the IDB representative, Robert Menapace, and the Prime Minister of Peru, Pedro Beltrán Espantoso participated in the first edition .

The second conference was held in 1962 under the title of Best Executives for a Better Peru. Peru's president, Ricardo Pérez Godoy, gave the closing speech. Since then, Peru's president, has always given the closing speech.

In October 1968, Juan Velasco Alvarado ousted President Fernando Belaúnde Terry in a military coup. In 1971, the CADE's organizing committee proposed a National Development Plan; However, the Velasquista regime began to socialize the productive apparatus of Peru.

=== 1970's ===
At the 1972 conference, the chairman of the organizing committee of CADE, Walter Piazza Tangüis, gave a speech in which he defended private enterprise and market freedom. Moreover, he criticized the interventionist role of the State. President Juan Velasco Alvarado, also at the table of honor, responded to Piazza saying that it was a mistake to focus on social problems from his point of view as an entrepreneur. Velasco then gave the closing speech of the conference and was applauded by businessmen close to the regime.

For 1979's CADE, the organizers invited the presidential candidates in the 1980 Peruvian general election to discuss their plans and proposals before the business community. The conference was titled Peru: problems and solutions and was attended by presidential candidates Armando Villanueva, Luis Bedoya Reyes and Fernando Belaúnde Terry. Since then, it is a tradition that each year prior to the electoral cycle candidates attend and speak at CADE.

=== 1980's ===
In July 1987, President Alan García announced the nationalization of banking. The organizing committee did not invite García to the conference. They decided to hold in the city of Iquitos. President García did not return to the CADE until 2003 as leader of the opposition to the government of Alejandro Toledo.

In the 1989 conference, novelist and then candidate Mario Vargas Llosa delivered a speech , announcing reforms to address of the economic crisis and hyper inflation.

=== 1990's ===
In December 1991, the meeting was held in Arequipa and President Alberto Fujimori gave the closing speech, in which he criticized the salary of the senators and deputies, months before making his self-coup.

There must not be sacred cows in Peru, [...] not even the parliamentarians. Let them learn that their cards are for presentation, but not for perks or for privileges or means of pressure. That is why it is regrettable that [...] while all Peruvians live the crisis in their own flesh, for those parliamentary gentlemen the sacrifice is already a thing of the past, the authority a simple word in his tirades and a purely symbolic thing tucked into the Budget Law [...] This is a sample of sterile parliamentarism. Nothing else can be said when we learn that the results of each representative and senator have been increased to over two thousand nuevos soles [...]. I would be the first to justify an increase of this nature if all parliamentarians really worked, without leaving the sessions without quorum and giving laws that kick the ball to the wrong arch.

— President Alberto Fujimori Closing Remarks at CADE, December 1st, 1991, published in Diario El Peruano

Fujimori also raised the possibility of a national referendum to know if the people would agree or not to renew by thirds or by halves or that there is no re-election in Parliament. Two days later, the motion of censure against the minister Enrique Rossl Link was approved in the Chamber of Deputies, for which the minister had to resign.

In the 1993 conference, the president of the National Confederation of Private Business Institutions (CONFIEP), Jorge Picasso, proposed for the first time the presidential re-election of Fujimori.

=== International speakers ===
The conference has had international guests such as presidents Ricardo Lagos, Carlos Salinas de Gortari, Álvaro Uribe, Sebastián Piñera; economist Michael Fairbanks, writers and scholars as Thomas Friedman, Francis Fukuyama and Paul Kennedy; high-level authorities as Juan Luis Londoño, Cecilia María Vélez, Sebastián Edwards Figueroa; and businesspeople as Bernardo Hernández González, among others.

== Conferences ==
Edition	Date	Venue	Slogan / Main theme	Chair of the Organizing Committee
1	September 14–18, 1961	Hotel Paracas, Paracas	Greater efficiency, rise of production: Keys to economic and social progress	Carlos Mariotti
2	September 20–24, 1962	Hotel Paracas, Paracas	Best Executives for a Better Peru	Carlos Mariotti
3	August 29 – September 2, 1963	Paracas	The dynamism of political structures	Carlos Mariotti
4	September 30 – October 3, 1965	Paracas	The economic society of the national capital market	Rodolfo Beek
5	October 6–9, 1966	Paracas	Companies in the national development	Rodolfo Beek
6	September 28 – October 1, 1967	Paracas	Peru in 1975	Rodolfo Beek
7	November 21–24, 1968	Paracas	Infrastructure as a means of national and regional integration	Federico Costa y Laurent
8	October 23–26, 1969	Paracas	Peru facing the challenge of integration: critical areas and priorities	Federico Costa y Laurent
9	November 13–15, 1970	Paracas	Peru: new industrial society	Samuel Drassinower
10	November 18–21, 1971	Paracas	National Development Plan	Luis Paredes Stagnaro
11	November 16–19, 1972	Paracas	Employment: a priority factor for socio-economic development	Walter Piazza Tangüis
12	November 1973	Paracas	Present and perspectives of Andean integration	Luis Paredes Stagnaro
13	November 14–17, 1974	Paracas	Companies and revolution	Pedro Reiser
14	October 16–19, 1975	Trujillo	The company and social promotion	Teresa Pareja Liñán
15	November 18–21, 1976	Hotel de Turistas, Arequipa	Economic recovery: national challenge	Daniel Rodríguez Hoyle
16	November 17–20, 1977	Cusco	Business action for decentralized development	Gonzalo Raffo Uzátegui
17	November 16–19, 1978	Paracas	Peru in the 80s	Felipe Ortiz de Zevallos
18	November 25–28, 1979	Tacna	Peru: problems and solutions	Alberto Sacio León
19	November 27–30, 1980	Paracas	Production and employment 1980–1985	Bernardo Rehder Remy
20	November 11–14, 1982	Hotel de Turistas, Selva Alegre, Arequipa	Goals and strategies for a national development plan	Juan Álvaro Lira Villanueva
21	November 17–20, 1983	Ica	Economic improvement: challenge for all	Juan Antonio Aguirre Roca
22	November 21–24, 1984	Hotel Crillón, Lima	Business consensus for a national development plan	Alberto Sacio León
23	November 21–24, 1985	Hotel Las Dunas, Ica	The challenge of change	Felipe Ortiz de Zevallos
24	November 13–16, 1986	Huaraz	Production: commitment of the present time	Óscar Espinosa Bedoya
25	November 26–29, 1987	Iquitos	Peru: crisis and future	Juan Incháustegui Vargas
26	November 18–20, 1988	Lima	Peru 2021, let's build its future	Alfredo Novoa Peña
27	November 30 – December 2, 1989	Hotel El Pueblo, Santa Clara, Lima	Foundations for development	Oswaldo Sandoval Aguirre
28	November 22–25, 1990	Hotel Las Dunas, Ica	The possible Peru: challenge and opportunities	Francisco Secada Paredes
29	November 28 – December 1, 1991	Arequipa	Corporate responsibility in the national development	Guillermo Van Oordt
30	December 3–6, 1992	Hotel Las Dunas, Ica	Peace and social welfare: let's assume responsibilities	José Chlimper Ackerman
31	November 2–5, 1993	Arequipa	Proposals for a consensus for Peru	Carlos Morelli Zavala
32	December 1–4, 1994	Hotel Las Dunas, Ica	Productive employment: everyone's responsibility	Gonzalo Galdós
33	November 1–4, 1995	Cusco	Peru company: towards a society for growth	Oscar Rivera Rivera
34	December 5–8, 1996	Arequipa	Peru 21st century: proposals for a shared vision	Drago Kisic Wagner
35	December 4–7, 1997	Hotel Las Dunas, Ica	Commitments of a shared vision, agenda to 2001	Alfredo Romero Vega
36	November 6–8, 1998	Universidad de Piura, Piura	Challenges of the present and strategies of the future	Francisco Gonzales García
37	January 20–23, 2000	Hotel El Pueblo, Santa Clara, Lima	21st Century: Proposals for a progressing Peru	Baldo Kresalja
38	January 24–27, 2001	Hotel El Pueblo, Santa Clara, Lima	Peru: In what country do we want to live?	Susana Eléspuru
39	November 10–12, 2001	Universidad Católica Santo Toribio de Mogrovejo, Chiclayo	Competing: a joint effort for the prosperity of all	Raúl Otero
40	November 28–30, 2002	Hotel El Pueblo, Santa Clara, Lima	Competing to win: the unpostponable challenge	Carmen Rosa Graham
41	November 19–21, 2003	Hotel Las Dunas, Ica	Institutionality: clear rules for investment	Rafael Fernández Stoll
42	October 21–23, 2004	Universidad Privada Antenor Orrego, Trujillo	Integration to the world: the response to unemployment	Eduardo Razzetto
43	December 1–3, 2005	Hotel El Pueblo, Santa Clara, Lima	Clear rules to govern: Let us choose the future of Peru together	José Chueca
44	November 30 – December 2, 2006	Arequipa	Inclusion and development for all	Ben Schneider Shpilberg
45	November 29 – December 1, 2007	Universidad Privada Antenor Orrego, Trujillo	All we need to be a fair and prosperous country	Diego de la Torre
46	October 30–31, 2008	Hotel El Pueblo, Santa Clara, Lima	The reform of the private sector	Fernando Zavala Lombardi
47	November 19–21, 2009	Hotel Libertador, Arequipa	Our future, our opportunity	Óscar Rivera
48	November 11–13, 2010	Urubamba, Cusco	Competitiveness: towards prosperity for all	Julio Luque
49	December 1–3, 2011	Cusco	Innovation: Let us accelerate the transformation of Peru	Carlos Heeren
50	November 29 – December 1, 2012	Centro de Convenciones Cerro Juli, Arequipa	Business leaders, commitment to Peru	Luis Torres Marisca
51	November 27–29, 2013	Paracas	Our commitment is to turn words into achievements	Ricardo Briceño
52	November 12–14, 2014	Paracas	Let's make Peru a first world country	Pablo de la Flor
53	December 2–4, 2015	Paracas	Peru needs changes to continue growing	Elena Conterno
54	November 30 – December 2, 2016	Paracas	Challenge 2021: the opportunity is now	Alfredo Torres
55	November 29 – December 1, 2017	Paracas	One Peru, no more separate strings	Drago Kisic Wagner
56	November 28–30, 2018	Paracas	Business leadership for a modern Peru	Gonzalo Aguirre
