= Juan José Salazar =

Colombian musician, sound engineer, producer

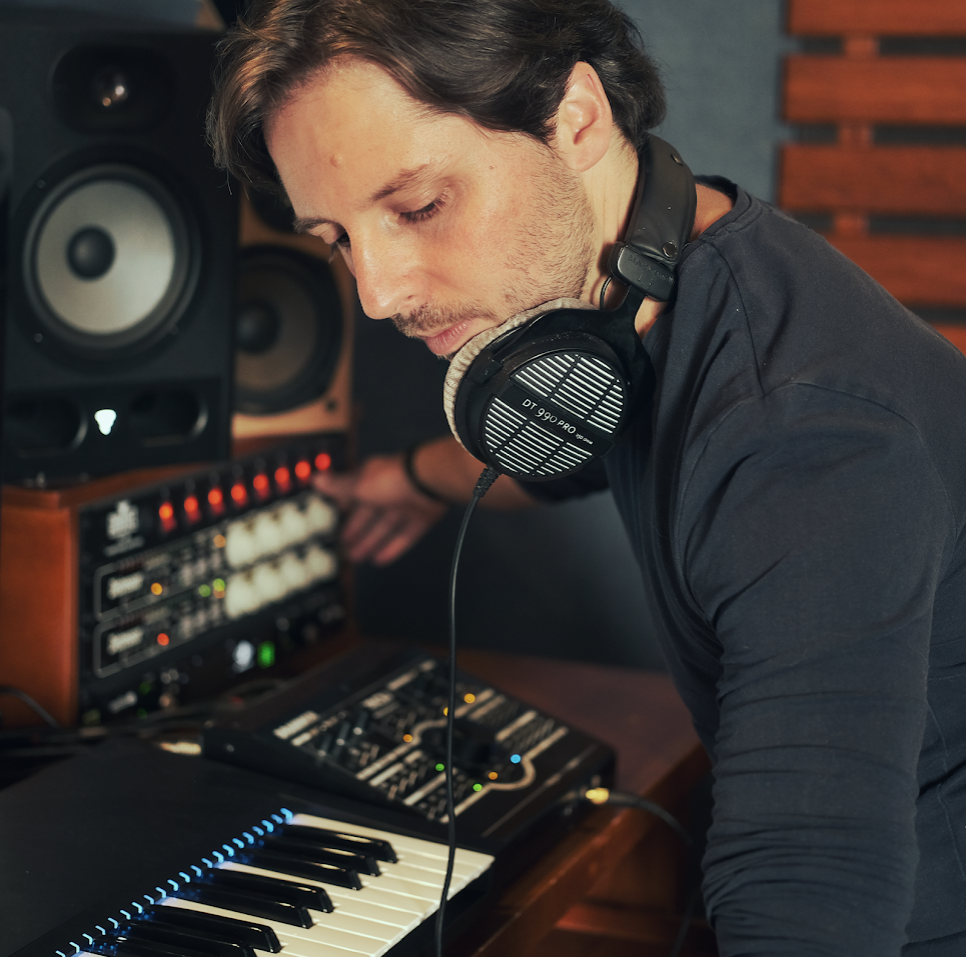
- Born: March 29, 1985 (age 41); Bogotá, Colombia
- Education: Pontifical Xavierian University; University of Westminster
- Occupations: Record producer; Musician
- Musical career
- Instruments: guitar; mandolin; bass; charango; tiple
- Years active: 2011–present

Juan José Salazar (Bogotá, March 29, 1985) is a musician, sound engineer and music producer, specialized in the composition and production of music for audiovisual media. He has produced music for different production companies and international media channels during the last years, including Amazon Prime Video, Discovery Networks, BBC, Telemundo and Disney. Since 2017, he started working in audio forensics, performing voice restoration, certifications, and biometrics for the public and private sector in Colombia.

Juan has worked in music production for marketing campaigns, various audiovisual content, and live events such as: Composition of the Americas Paralympic Committee Hymn, A Grito Herido (Amazon Prime), Cochina Envidia (Amazon Prime), Wella/Unicef: Making Waves, El Barón (Telemundo), Festival Iberoamericano de Teatro de Bogotá, El Bronx (Caracol TV), El Man es Germán 2, Discovery Channel: Arizona SB1070 (documentary), and Protagonistas de Nuestra Tele, among others.

As a music producer, he has worked with artists such as Hot Chip, Diana Ángel, César Mora, Compañía Ilimitada, Ricardo Prado, Cocó Nonó, Burning Caravan, Maia and Natalia Durán.

In 2011 he received the John Leckie Award for Excellence in Music Production from the University of Westminster in London after completing his master's degree at this institution, which he attended with the Colfuturo scholarship in 2010. In 2021, two of the Television shows he wrote original music for: Frente al Espejo and Fuerzas Invisibles, won the TAL awards of Latin American public TV Networks, recognizing his talents as a composer.

He currently works as a composer and music producer at his own studio in Bogotá and as a professor of sound engineering and music production at the Pontificia Universidad Javeriana, Bogotá.
