= Ismael Benavides =

Peruvian politician

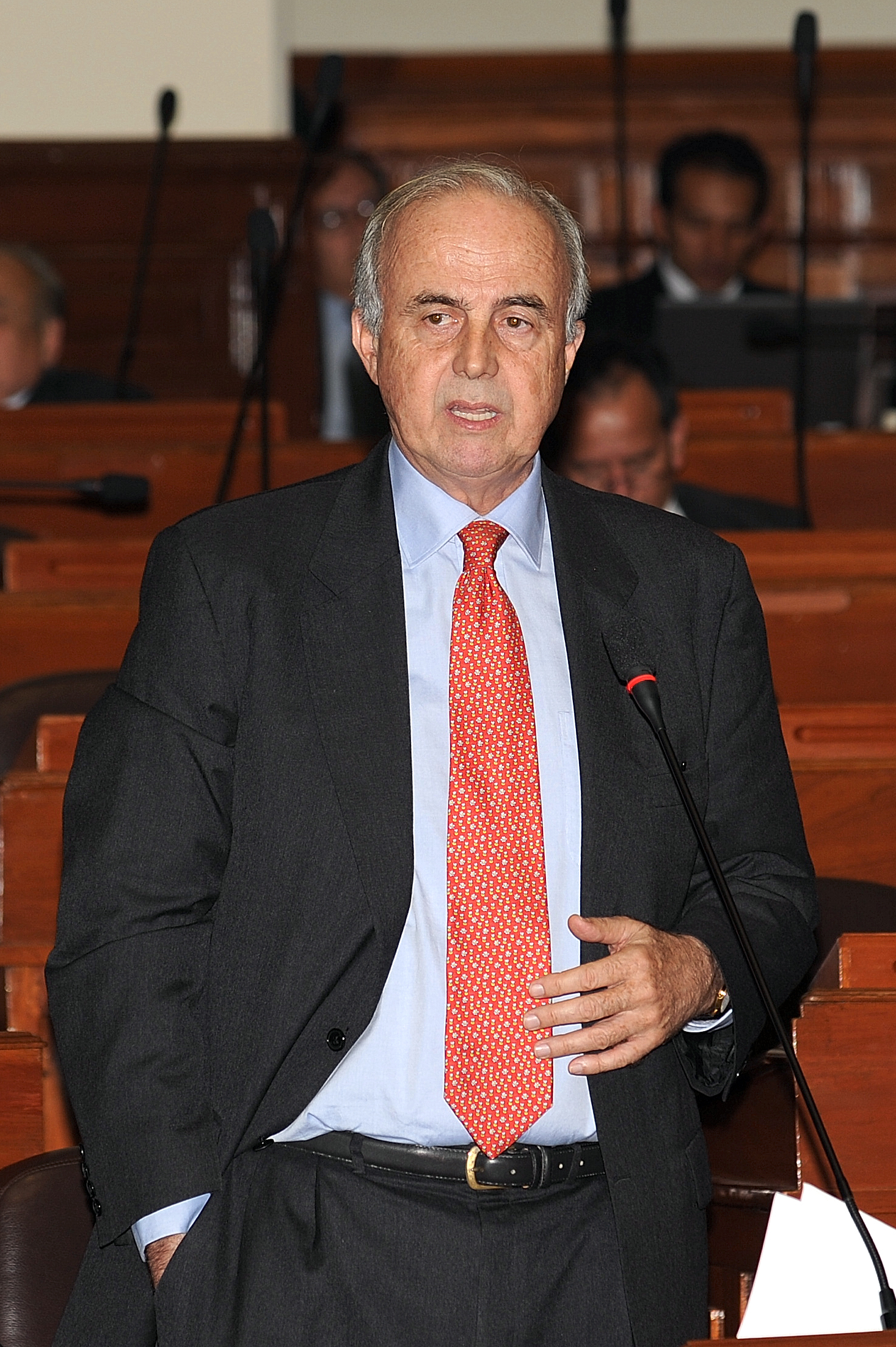

Minister of Economy and Finance of Peru
- In office 14 September 2010 – 28 July 2011
- President: Alan Garcia
- Preceded by: Mercedes Aráoz
- Succeeded by: Miguel Castilla

Minister of Agriculture of Peru
- In office 20 May 2007 – 11 October 2008
- President: Alan Garcia
- Preceded by: Juan José Salazar
- Succeeded by: Carlos Leyton

Minister of Fishery of Peru
- In office 13 October 1984 – 28 July 1985
- President: Fernando Belaúnde Terry
- Preceded by: Fortunato Quesada Lagarrigue
- Succeeded by: José Palomino Roedel
- In office 23 December 1983 – 20 April 1984
- President: Fernando Belaúnde Terry
- Preceded by: Luis Pércovich Roca
- Succeeded by: Fortunato Quesada Lagarrigue

Member of the Chamber of Deputies
- In office 26 July 1990 – 5 April 1992
- Constituency: Ica

Personal details
- Born: Ismael Benavides Ferreyros; 10 May 1945 (age 80) Lima, Peru
- Party: Independent
- Other political affiliations: Popular Action; FREDEMO

Ismael Benavides Ferreyros (born 10 May 1945) is a Peruvian politician, who was the former Minister of Economy and Finance that was under President Alan García from September 2010 to July 2011. He was also Minister of Agriculture from 2007 to 2008. He was also a member of the lower house of the Congress of the Republic of Peru, representing Ica under the FREDEMO coalition, which grouped the Popular Action Party from 1990 to 1992, in which President Alberto Fujimori dissolved the Congress in a self-coup. He was also the Minister of Fishery under the second administration of President Fernando Belaúnde Terry.

== Biography ==
Son of Ismael Benavides de la Quintana and María Ferreyros Gaffron. His family is linked to the business sector, owners of Compañía de Minas Buenaventura, his uncle, Alberto Benavides de la Quintana, was director of the Central Reserve Bank of Peru, his cousins, Roque Benavides Ganoza and Carlos Ferreyros Aspíllaga, are current manager of Buenaventura and vice president of Ferreyros SA, respectively. He did his school studies at the San Juan school in Chaclacayo. He studied Agricultural Economics at the University of California at Berkeley and later obtained a Master's degree in Finance from the same university.

From 1967 to 1970 he was deputy manager of the First National City Bank. From 1970 to 1975 he was Financial Manager of the Alpasa Services Company in Venezuela. From 1975 to 1980 he was General Manager of Univest C.A in Quito, Ecuador. He was a consultant for the World Bank and has worked on issues such as privatizations in Bolivia, in 1986 and 1988. From 1993 to March 2007, he was General Manager and member of the Board of Directors of the International Bank of Peru, Interbank. From 2005 to 2007 he was president of the Association of Banks of Peru (ASBANC). He was President of the Peruvian-Chilean Chamber of Commerce. It is also dedicated to its agricultural and wine export businesses.

Since 2002 it takes up the family tradition in the elaboration of Quebranta grape Pisco from the Huamaní farm. The Procesadora y Empacadora Huamaní company is located at kilometer 245 of the Panamericana Sur, district of Paracas, Department of Ica, where asparagus and the popular Tangelo orange are also produced.

== Political career ==
From 1980 to 1981 he was General Manager of the Development Finance Corporation (COFIDE).

In December 1981 he was appointed Director of the Central Reserve Bank on behalf of the Executive Power. From 1981 to 1982 he was Vice Minister of the Economy. In January 1982 he was appointed Vice Minister of Finance, a position he held in the governments of Manuel Ulloa Elías and Carlos Rodríguez-Pastor Mendoza. He resigned from the Vice Ministry in December 1983. On December 29, 1983 he was appointed Minister of Fisheries by President Fernando Belaúnde Terry, a position he held until 1985.

=== Deputy ===
In 1990, he joined the Democratic Front (FREDEMO) and was part of the party's National Executive Committee. In the general elections of 1990, he ran for the Chamber of Deputies of the Department of Ica for the Democratic Front (FREDEMO), he was elected with 17,040 preferential votes. His legislative work was interrupted by the Fujimori Autogolpe of 1992.

=== Second García administration ===
In May 2007 he was appointed Minister of Agriculture by President Alan García. He remained in office until October 2008. On September 14, 2010 he was sworn in as Minister of Economy and Finance in the cabinet of José Antonio Chang, in the last cabinet of the second government of Alan García. As Minister of Economy, he promoted the bill to reduce the General Sales Tax (IGV) by one percentage point (from 19% to 18%). Likewise, the project included the reduction of the Financial Transaction Tax (ITF) from 0.05 to 0.005%, which implies a reduction of 90% .

He remained in office until July 2011, at the end of Alan García's government.
