= Martín Pérez (politician) =

Peruvian politician (born 1965)

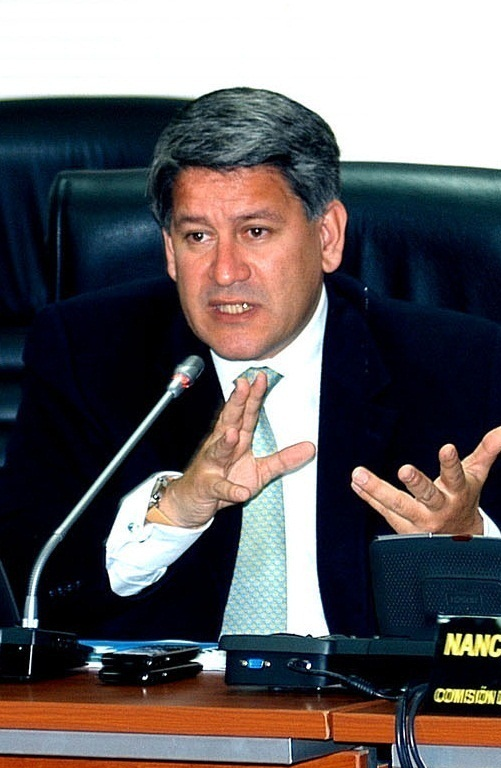

Member of Congress
- In office 26 July 2006 – 26 July 2011
- Constituency: Callao

Personal details
- Born: Martín Pérez Monteverde; 4 February 1965 (age 61) Lima, Peru
- Party: National Unity
- Spouse: Patricia Baertl Aramburú
- Occupation: Politician

Martín Pérez Monteverde (born 4 February 1965) is a Peruvian politician. He is a Congressman representing the Constitutional Province of Callao for the period 2006–2011, and belongs to the National Unity party. From 2009 and 2010, he was the Minister of Foreign Trade and Tourism during the Second Presidency of Alan García.

== Biography ==
Son of Miguel Pérez Muñoz and Lilly Monteverde. He is married to Patricia Baertl Aramburú and has four children, Alejandra, Martín, Diego and Jose Miguel. He conducted his school studies at the College of Immaculate Lima. He followed studies of business administration at the University of the Pacific, specializing in Marketing and Finance, is graduated from the High Management Program of the University of Piura. In addition, he participated in the USA Wharton Management Congress, organized by the prestigious Wharton School of the University of Pennsylvania. He has served as General Manager of Samtronics Peru (1993-1997), Inter-American Cars (1997), Autocorp (1997-1999), Commercial Ransa (1999-2002) and Zonal Multimerrow S.A. (2002-2005). In March of 2015 he assumed the presidency of the confer for the period 2015-2017. He is a former Congressman representing the Constitutional Province of Callao for the period 2006–2011, and belongs to the National Unity party. From 2009 and 2010, he was the Minister of Foreign Trade and Tourism during the Second Presidency of Alan García.
