= SWAM Canada =

Canadian not-for-profit organization

- Predecessor: SwimAbility Canada; Making Waves Canada
- Founded: 2009
- Founder: Matthew Morantz
- Type: Not-for-profit corporation
- Legal status: Active
- Location: Canada
- Region served: Canada
- Official languages: English, French
- Main organ: Board of Directors, elected by the Chapters at the Annual General Meeting
- Website: www.swamcanada.ca

Swimming With A Mission (SWAM) Canada, previously SwimAbility Canada (2016–2018) and Making Waves Canada (2009–2016), is a Canadian not-for-profit organization whose mission is to improve the lives of children with disabilities through private, low-cost, and adapted swimming and water safety instruction.

== Scope of activities ==
The organization's mandate is to provide services to children left behind by typical organizations that provide swimming lessons. Programming is provided via SwimAbility's chapter intermediaries which have their own management committees. Since 2009, the organization has established itself in cities across the country and now offers over 9000 lessons per year. SwimAbility Canada partners with NGOs around the world, sending trained instructors to develop swimming curricula and to increase awareness of and support for persons with disabilities. The second Annual General Meeting was held on June 22, 2014, at the University of Toronto.

== Affiliated chapters ==
SWAM currently oversees the following 15 chapters:

British Columbia

- SwimAbility Okanagan (the University of British Columbia at Okanagan)

Weekly swimming lessons are held on Saturdays at the Parkinson Recreation Centre and on Sundays at the Johnson Bentley Memorial Aquatic Centre, located in Kelowna. The cost per child is $25 per season (of 9 lessons).

Manitoba

- SwimAbility Dauphin
- SwimAbility Brandon
- SwimAbility Winnipeg (University of Winnipeg)

Weekly swimming lessons are held at Seven Oaks and/or the Margaret Grant Pool in Winnipeg. The cost per child is $20 per season (of 8 lessons).

Ontario

- SwimAbility London (University of Western Ontario)

Weekly swimming lessons are held at the swimming pool of the Western Student Recreation Facility, located on the University of Western Ontario campus in London, Ontario. The cost per child is $30 per season (of 8 lessons).

- SwimAbility Kitchener-Waterloo (University of Waterloo)

Weekly swimming lessons are held at the Physical Activities Complex on the University of Waterloo's campus in Waterloo.

- SwimAbility Hamilton (McMaster University)

Weekly swimming lessons are held at the swimming pool of Hamilton Downtown Family YMCA Pool, located in Hamilton, Ontario. The cost per child is $25 per season for 30-minute lessons or $50 per season for one-hour lessons (of 8 lessons).

- SwimAbility Mississauga (University of Toronto Mississauga)

Weekly swimming lessons are held at the Cawthra Park Pool in Mississauga. The cost per child is $35 per season (of 7 lessons).

- SwimAbility Toronto (University of Toronto St. George)

Weekly swimming lessons are held at the Beverley School Pool in Toronto, Ontario. The cost per child is $40 per season (of 8 lessons).

- SwimAbility Kingston (Queen's University)

Weekly swimming lessons are held at the Queen's Athletics and Recreation Centre in Kingston. The cost per child is $25 per season (of 8-10 lessons).

- SwimAbility Ottawa (University of Ottawa)

Weekly swimming lessons are held at the swimming pool of Jack Purcell Community Centre Pool and/or Lowertown Community Centre Pool, located in Downtown Ottawa, Ontario. The cost per child is $25 per season (of 8 lessons).

- SwimAbility Sudbury (Laurentian University)

Weekly swimming lessons are held at the Jeno Tihanyi Olympic Gold Pool, located on the Laurentian University campus. The cost per child is $15–25 per season (of 6-10 lessons).

Quebec

- SwimAbility Montreal (McGill University)

SwimAbility classes are held at the swimming pool of the CEGEP du Vieux-Montréal, which is located in downtown Montreal, Quebec. The cost per child is $20 per season (there are 8 lessons offered per season).

In 2009, SwimAbility Montreal won the 2009 Forces Avenir Award for work towards Mutual Aid, Peace and Justice in Quebec.

New Brunswick

- SwimAbility Saint John (Faculty of Medicine, Dalhousie University at Saint John Regional Hospital and University of New Brunswick, Saint John Campus)

Weekly swimming lessons are held at the Canada Games Aquatic Centre in Saint John, New Brunswick. The cost per child is $20 per season (8 lessons).

Nova Scotia

- SwimAbility Halifax (Dalhousie University)

Weekly swimming lessons are held at the Centennial Pool in downtown Halifax. The cost per child is $20 per season (there are 8 lessons offered per season).

Windsor

- SwimAbility Windsor (University of Windsor)

Weekly swimming lessons are held at the YMCA Aquatic Centre in Windsor, Ontario. The cost for one child is $20 per season (there are 8 lessons offered per season).
