= Universidad del Pacífico (Peru) =

University in Lima, Peru

Coordinates: 12°05′02″S 77°02′54″W

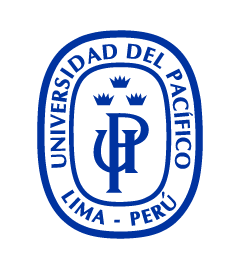
- Other names: UP
- Motto: "Formamos líderes responsables para el mundo"
- Motto in English: "Forming responsible leaders for the world"
- Type: Private
- Established: February 28, 1962 (64 years ago)
- Affiliations: SEKN, Laurin, AACSB, AAMBA; Consortium of Universities
- Religious affiliation: Jesuit (Roman Catholic)
- Rector: Felipe Portocarrero Suárez
- Students: 5,000 approx.
- Location: Av. Salaverry 2020, Jesús María, Lima, Peru
- Campus: Urban
- Colors: Blue
- Website: www.up.edu.pe

Universidad del Pacifico (UP) is a private university in the Jesús María District of Lima, Peru.

It was established in 1962 by a group of Peruvian entrepreneurs supported by the Society of Jesus. Ranked as the most prestigious higher education institution in its fields of specialization in Peru (especially in economics), it is also one of the leading institutions of its kind in Latin American and is the first Peruvian university to be AACSB accredited in both undergraduate and graduate degree programs. It is also AMBA accredited.

== Administration ==
The Society of Jesus co-founded the university and made the administrative and academic decisions necessary to establish it. Jesuits continue to make strategic decisions for UP, which is a member of the Association of Universities Entrusted to the Society of Jesus in Latin America – twenty-eight universities in fifteen countries of Latin America. The Society of Jesus together with the Board ensures compliance with principles behind the Universidad del Pacifico statutes.

== Academics ==
The university specializes in Business Management and Economics.

At the undergraduate level, UP started off by offering bachelor's degrees in Economics, Business Administration and Accounting. In 2008, it became the first university in Peru to offer a management Engineering degree. That same year, Law was added to its degree programs. In 2011 two new departments were opened, International Business and Marketing. At the graduate level, it offers a Master of Business Administration, a Master of Finance and a Master of Economics. In August 2011, the university as well as its Post-Graduate school received the AACSB (Association to Advance Collegiate School of Business) accreditation. The graduate school is called now the Pacìfico Business School.

UP has approximately 5000 students enrolled. The academic year at the undergraduate level consists of two semesters, from late-March to July and mid-August to mid-December, with a 3 to 4 week break between. At the graduate level the academic year consists of three terms: January–April, May–August, and September–December. UP cooperates with other agencies to provide service-learning courses.

== Research projects ==
The university, through the Research Center of the university (Centro de Investigación de la Universidad del Pacífico or CIUP, for short), conducts large-scale research projects within Peru and at the Latin American level, in matters of economic theory and trade, public policy, fiscal policy, environmental issues, human development, civil society, philanthropy, and SMEs development. Some of these are funded by the Kellogg Foundation, the World Bank, the Inter-American Development Bank, and other regional development agencies.

== Notable alumni ==
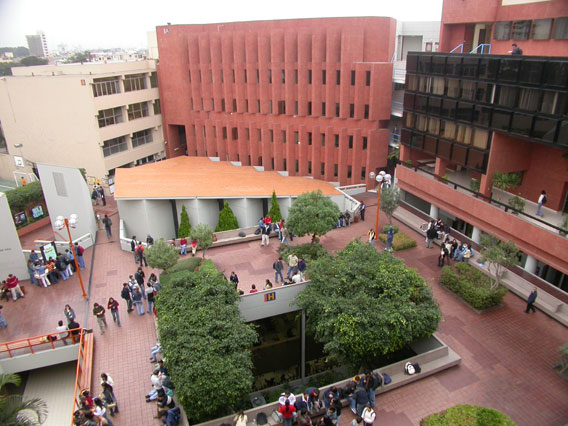
UP Central Plaza

- Mercedes Aráoz – Former Peruvian Minister of Economy and Finance and ex-Prime Minister. Elected 2nd Vice President of Peru.
- Martín Pérez Monteverde – Peruvian politician.
- Hernán Garrido Lecca – Peruvian economist and politician.
- Renzo Rossini – Former general manager of the BCRP.
- Eduardo Torres-Llosa – General manager of the BCRP.
- Diego Macera Poli – Director of the BCRP.
- Germán Alarco Tosoni – Director of the BCRP.
- Raúl Diez Canseco Terry – Peruvian politician and economist.
- Julio Velarde Flores – President of the BCRP.
- Susana de la Puente Wiese – Ambassador from the Republic of Peru to the Court of St. James's.
- Raimundo Morales Dasso – Vice-chairman of Credicorp Ltd. and ex-CEO of Banco de Crédito del Perú.
- Walter Bayly – Former CEO of Credicorp Ltd. and ex-CEO of Banco de Crédito del Perú.
- Gianfranco Ferrari de las Casas – CEO of Credicorp Ltd. and ex-CEO of Banco de Crédito del Perú.
- Fernando Zavala Lombardi – Former Peruvian Minister of Economy and Finance, ex-Prime Minister and CEO of Intercorp.
- Jorge González Izquierdo – Former Peruvian Minister of Labor and Promotion of Employment.
- Carlos Boloña Behr – Politician and president of the Free Trade Institute (IELM).
- Fernando Olivera Vega – Politician, ex-ambassador to Spain and former congressman.
- Eduardo Ferreyros Küppers – Politician, ex-minister of external commerce and tourism.
- María Antonieta Alva – Former Peruvian Minister of Economy and Finance.
- Claudia Cooper – Former Peruvian Minister of Economy and Finance.
- Carlos Oliva – Former Peruvian Minister of Economy and Finance and Director of the BCRP.
- Gustavo Meza-Cuadra Velásquez – Former Peruvian Minister of Foreign Affairs, ex-permanent representative to the United Nations and Director of the Academia Diplomática del Perú Javier Perez de Cuellar.
- Elsa Galarza – Former Peruvian Minister of Environment.

== See also ==
- List of Jesuit sites
