= Luis Valdivieso Montano =

Peruvian politician

Luis Miguel Valdivieso Montano
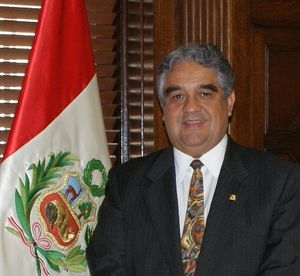
- Luis Miguel Valdivieso Montano

Luis Miguel Valdivieso Montano is a Peruvian economist. He was the Minister of Economy and Finance of Peru from July 2008 until January 2009. He was the Ambassador Extraordinary and Plenipotentiary of Peru in the United States in 2009.

== Early life ==
Prior to joining the IMF, Mr. Valdivieso was a senior researcher, Center for Latin American Monetary Studies, advisor to Bank and Securities Market Directorate of the Ministry of Finance and Public Credit in Mexico and advisor to the Superintendence of Banks of Ecuador. Also, he taught introductory economics and advanced macroeconomics at Boston University and was an econometrics instructor at the Catholic University of Peru.

Valdivieso holds a B.A. in economics from the Catholic University of Peru, and a Ph.D. and an M.A. in economics from Boston University.

== Professional career ==
In this capacity, he was also Governor for Peru in the board of governors of the World Bank and Inter-American Development Bank, as well as chairman of the board of the Andean Finance Corporation (CAF), the National Fund for the Financing of the Public Sector Entrepreneurial Activity (FONAFE), and member of the board of the Peruvian National Retirement Investment Fund (ONP), the Private Investment Promotion Agency (PROINVERSION), and the Inter-ministerial Committee of Social Affairs (CIAS).

Most of Valdivieso’s professional career was at the International Monetary Fund (IMF), where he worked for 28 years starting in 1980. He held senior management positions in various departments, including advisor and division chief, positions in the Asia and Pacific Department (1999–2008) as well as the European Department (1991–1999), which covered all the countries of the former Soviet Union. Moreover, he held senior economist positions in the Policy Development and Review Department (1997–1999), and the Western Hemisphere Department (1980–1987).

During his career at the IMF, he played key roles in the negotiations of several major IMF-supported programs, as well as policy consultations, including Indonesia, Malaysia, Bangladesh, Sri Lanka, Cambodia, Laos, East Timor, Russia, Kazakhstan, Tajikistan, Armenia, Turkmenistan, Mexico, Colombia, Trinidad and Tobago, El Salvador and Somalia. In addition to his country policy experience, Mr. Valdivieso worked extensively on international capital market issues and developing countries’ external debt issues, and contributed directly to the design of IMF’s policies on post-conflict assistance, bank restructuring and supervision, monitoring issues related to financial sector reform, anti-money laundering issues and terrorism, custom unions, fiscal issues, and data management and dissemination. Mr. Valdivieso also was a Special Technical Advisor to the Ministry of Economy and Finance of Peru in 1991.

Preceded by Felipe Ortiz de Zevallos	Ambassador of Peru to the US; February 17, 2009 - May 20, 2009	Succeeded by Harold Forsyth
