= Mercedes Aráoz =

Peruvian economist, academic, and politician (born 1961)

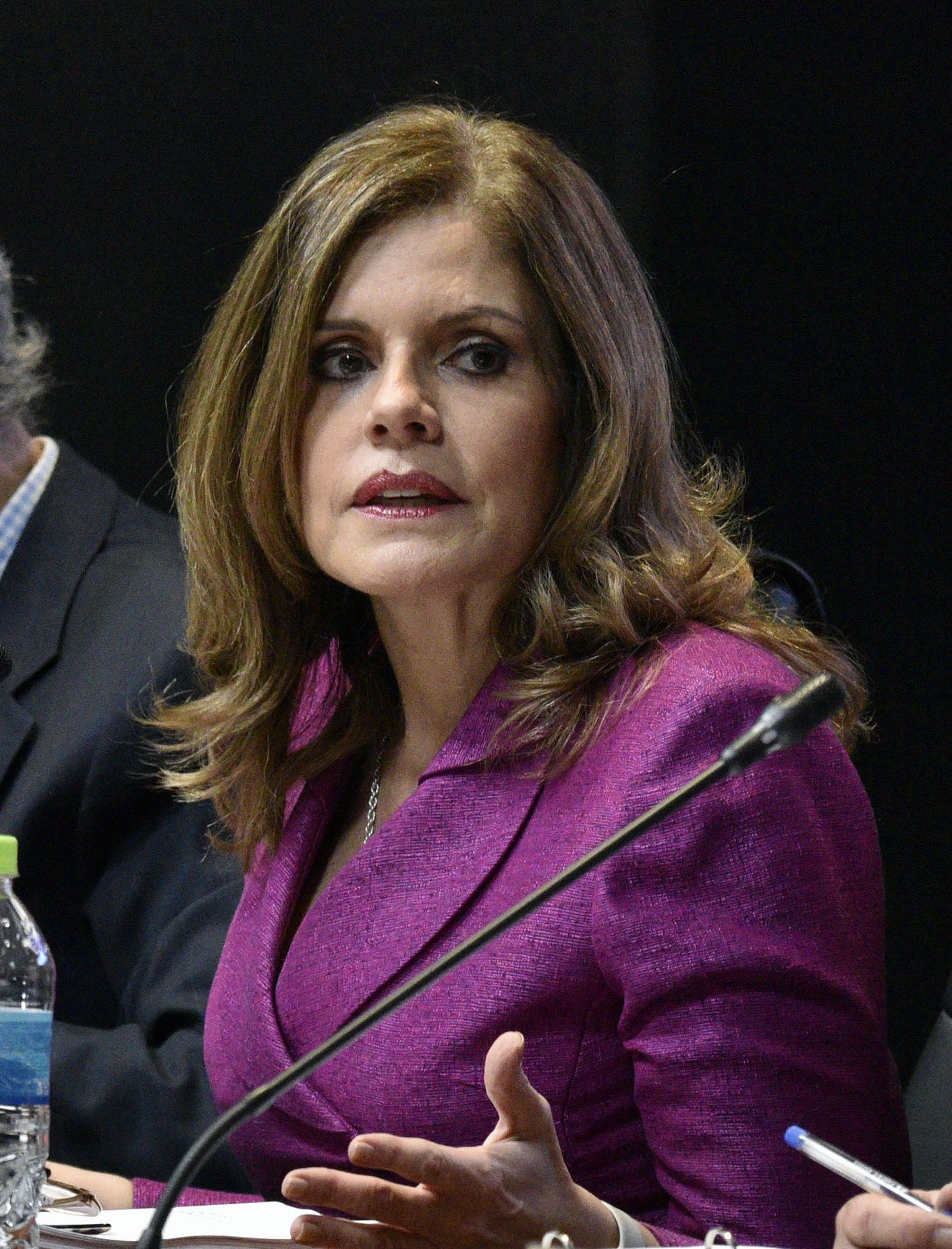
- Aráoz in 2017

Interim President of Peru Partial recognition (Note: Interim Presidency de jure partially recognized during the 2019–2020 Peruvian constitutional crisis.)
- In office 30 September 2019 – 1 October 2019; Disputed with Martín Vizcarra
- Prime Minister: Vicente Zeballos
- Vice President: First Vice President; Vacant; Second Vice President; Herself
- Preceded by: Martín Vizcarra
- Succeeded by: Martín Vizcarra

30th Second Vice President of Peru
- In office 28 July 2016 – 7 May 2020 (Note: Aráoz resigned on 1 October 2019 as part of the 2019 constitutional crisis; however, congress did not accept her resignation until 7 May 2020.)
- President: Pedro Pablo Kuczynski; Martín Vizcarra
- Preceded by: Omar Chehade (2012)
- Succeeded by: Miki Torres (2026)

156th Prime Minister of Peru
- In office 17 September 2017 – 2 April 2018
- President: Pedro Pablo Kuczynski; Martín Vizcarra
- Preceded by: Fernando Zavala
- Succeeded by: César Villanueva
Ministerial offices
Minister of Economy and Finance
In office 22 December 2009 – 14 September 2010
President	Alan García
Prime Minister	Javier Velásquez
Preceded by	Luis Carranza
Succeeded by	Ismael Benavides
Minister of Production
In office 11 July 2009 – 22 December 2009
President	Alan García
Prime Minister	Javier Velásquez
Preceded by	Elena Conterno
Succeeded by	José Gonzales Quijano
Minister of Foreign Trade and Tourism
In office 28 July 2006 – 11 July 2009
President	Alan García
Prime Minister	Jorge Del Castillo; Yehude Simon
Preceded by	Alfredo Ferrero
Succeeded by	Martín Pérez

Member of Congress
- In office 26 July 2016 – 30 September 2019
- Constituency: Lima

Personal details
- Born: Mercedes Rosalba Aráoz Fernández; 5 August 1961 (age 65) Lima, Peru
- Party: Independent
- Other political affiliations: Peruvian Aprista Party (before 2012)
- Education: University of the Pacific (BA); University of Miami (MA, PhD)

Mercedes Rosalba Aráoz Fernández (born 5 August 1961) is a Peruvian economist, professor, and politician who served as Second Vice President of Peru from 2016 to 2020. At the beginning of her political career, she served as Minister of Foreign Trade and Tourism from 2006 to July 2009, after which she was appointed briefly as Minister of Production, and finally as Minister of Economy and Finance, all portfolios under the second presidency of Alan García.

At the 2016 Peruvian general election, Aráoz ran for the Second Vice Presidency along with Pedro Pablo Kuczynski and Martin Vizcarra in the Peruvians for Change ticket, being ultimately elected in a tight run-off against Keiko Fujimori's Popular Force ticket. Simultaneously, she was elected to Congress for the 2016–2021 term. In the Kuczynski administration, she was appointed Prime Minister of Peru, serving from 17 September 2017 to 2 April 2018. Kuczynski resigned on 23 March 2018, following a corruption scandal, thus making Martín Vizcarra the new President of Peru; Araóz subsequently acted as the only Vice President in the Vizcarra administration.

On 30 September 2019, a dispute between Martín Vizcarra and Congress resulted in the dissolution of Congress by the President, which in turn suspended Vizcarra and named Aráoz as Interim President. During the 2019–2020 Peruvian constitutional crisis, the suspension of Vizcarra was generally not recognized, forcing Aráoz to decline the claim to the interim presidency on 1 October 2019. Her resignation was accepted by Congress on 7 May 2020, leaving both Vice Presidencies vacant.

== Early life and education ==
Aráoz was born 5 August 1961, in Lima. She attended St. Mary's School in Magdalena del Mar, a district of Lima.

She then attended Universidad del Pacífico in Lima, where she studied economics, and later obtained a Master's degree in economics and PhD in economics from the University of Miami School of Business at the University of Miami in Coral Gables, Florida in the United States.

Aráoz completed specialization courses in foreign trade policies at Harvard Kennedy School at Harvard University, and at the Latin American Network of Commercial Policy in Buenos Aires. She also studied coaching at Newfield Network at Santiago de Chile.

== Career ==
=== Foreign Trade and Tourism (2006–2009) ===
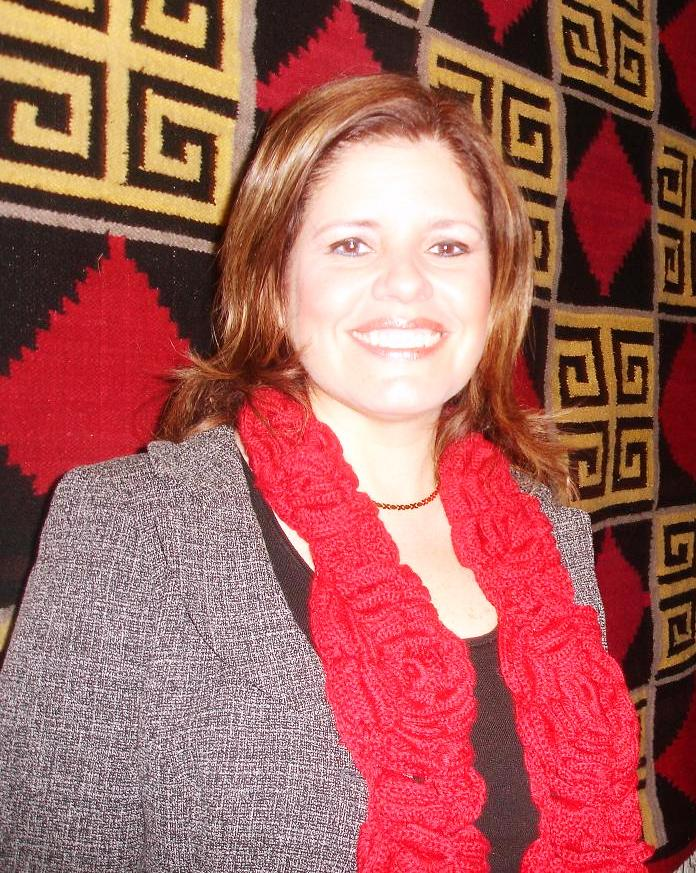
Aráoz in 2007

On 28 July 2006, Aráoz was named as Minister of Foreign Trade and Tourism by Peruvian president Alan García. During her tenure, she fostered free trade negotiations with the European Union and EFTA, and the trade agreements with the governments of Canada, China, Canada, Chile, Mexico, Japan, and others.

=== Production (2009) ===
On 11 July 2009, Aráoz was named as Minister of Production after leaving the Foreign Trade and Tourism portfolio.

=== Economy and Finance (2009–2010) ===
In December 2009, Aráoz was named as Minister of Economy and Finance. She was the first woman in Peruvian history to hold this office.

During her nine months of managing the Ministry, priority was given to the promotion of infrastructure and public services investment projects. During her term, the government maintained the growth of the Peruvian economy despite the 2008 financial crisis.

=== 2011 Peruvian Aprista Party presidential nomination ===
In November 2010, congressman Mauricio Mulder proposed Aráoz for presidential nomination for American Popular Revolutionary Alliance (APRA) in the 2011 general election. In spite of her resignation as Finance Minister, she was propelled by the government to run for the nomination. She won the majority in at the party's national convention, and accepted the nomination on 28 November 2010. Despite criticism for selecting an independent pro-market liberal as the social democrat party's nominee, her run was viewed by analysts as an intent of propelling the party for future Alan García run in 2016, despite low chances of victory in 2011. As running mates, the party selected former prime minister and congressman Javier Velásquez (1st) and former cabinet minister and congresswoman Nidia Vílchez (2nd).

Throughout the internal process, however, Aráoz held many disagreements with high-ranking party leaders, such as former prime minister Jorge Del Castillo, who was ultimately selected as the head of the congressional list for the Lima constituency. Aráoz heavily criticized the decision of including among the congressional candidates Del Castillo, based on the corruption allegations imputed against him. This event would finally lead to her nomination withdrawal on 16 January 2011. The party would not field any candidate for the election, and Aráoz would retire momentarily from politics.

== Congresswoman and Vice president ==
In the 2016 general election, Aráoz ran with the Peruvians for Change party as candidate both for Congress and for Second Vice President as running mate of Pedro Pablo Kuczynski. She remains an independent within the Party. The ticket was successful and Aráoz was elected Second Vice President.

== Vice presidency ==
In August 2016, Aráoz was appointed chair of the APEC Peru 2016 High-Level Commission. The commission was made to determine necessary guidelines, strategies and measures to guarantee Peru's success as host of the meeting.

In August 2017, Aráoz was named as Commissioner for Peru-OECD adherence process.

== Prime Minister of Peru ==
In September 2017, Aráoz was sworn in as President of the Council of Ministers (Prime Minister). She held the office until April 2018.

== Academic career ==
She is Principal Professor of International Economy at the University of the Pacific and member of the Research Center. She is also professor at the Diplomatic Academy of Peru.

She has worked as a consultant with a variety of international organizations including the World Bank, the United Nations Conference on Trade and Development (UNCTAD), the Organization of American States (OAS) and the CAF – Development Bank of Latin America.

Aráoz served as Country Representative for the Inter-American Development Bank (IADB) in Mexico City from 2011 until 2015.

== Explanatory notes ==
Political offices
Preceded by Luis Carranza	Minister of Economy and Finance; 2009–2010	Succeeded by Ismael Benavides Ferreyros
Vacant Title last held by Omar Chehade	Second Vice President of Peru; 2016–2020	Vacant
Preceded by Fernando Zavala	Prime Minister of Peru; 2017–2018	Succeeded by César Villanueva
