= Susana Pinilla =

Peruvian anthropologist and politician

Susana Isabel Pinilla Cisneros is a Peruvian anthropologist and politician. She has served as Minister of Labour and Promotion of Employment, Women's and Social Development Minister, and as CAF Country Director. She has an anthropology degree from National University of San Marcos and a Masters in "Governance and Public Policy" from the Universidad de San Martín de Porres.
