= Manuela García Cochagne =

Peruvian lawyer

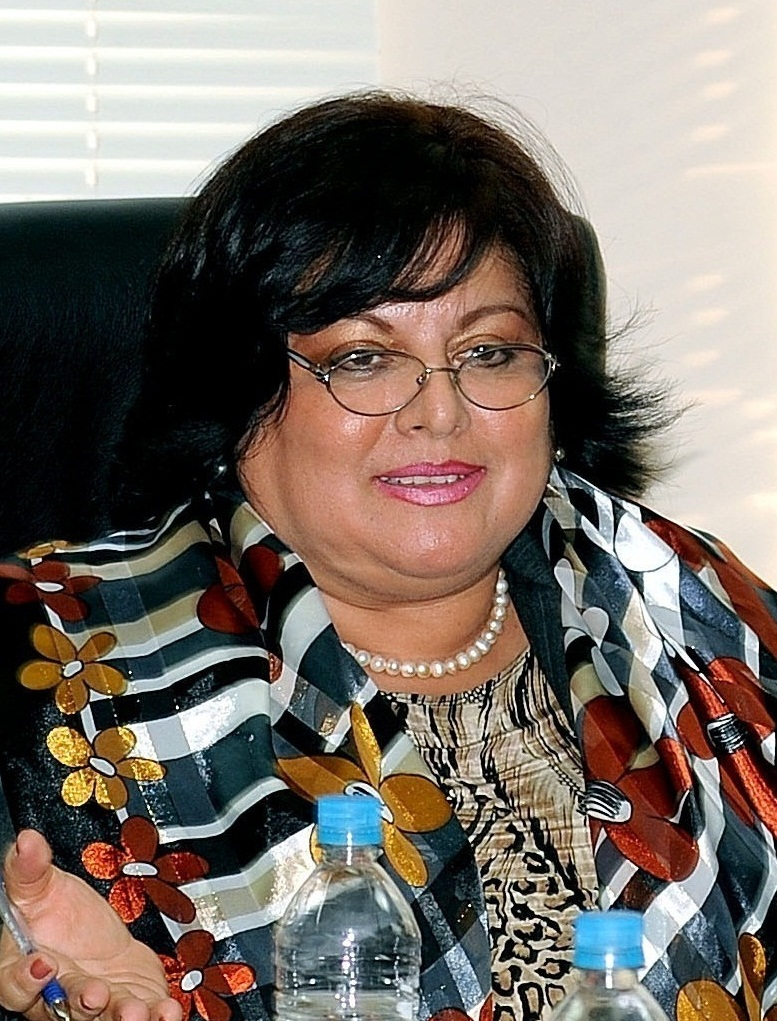
Manuela García Cochagne

Manuela Esperanza García Cochagne has been the Peruvian Minister of Work and Employment under President Alan García since July 2009.
