= Jorge Villasante =

Peruvian politician

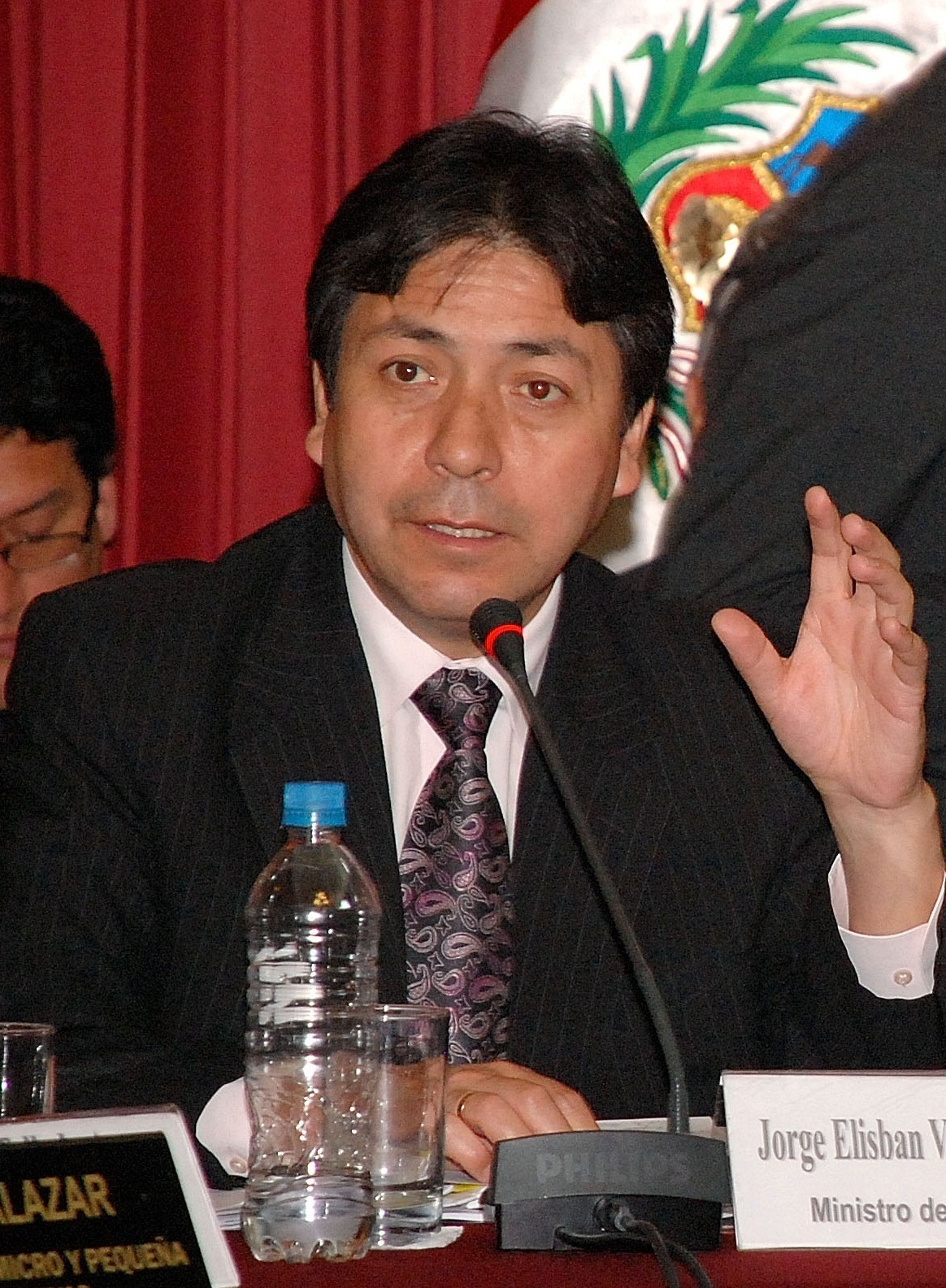
Jorge Villasante

Jorge Villasante Araníbar (born 1962) is a Peruvian politician, who was the Peruvian Minister of Production under President Alan García between September 2010 and May 2011.
