= Ministry of the Interior (Peru) =

Government ministry of Peru

- Ministerio del Interior
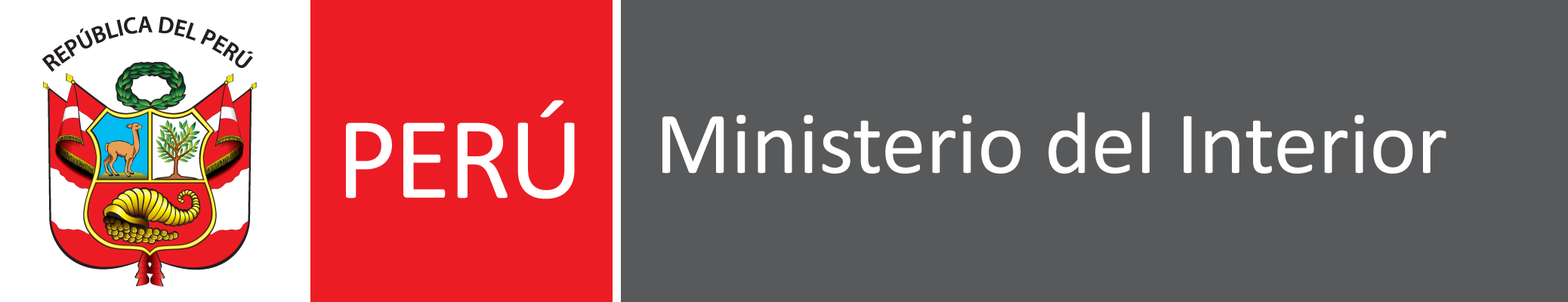

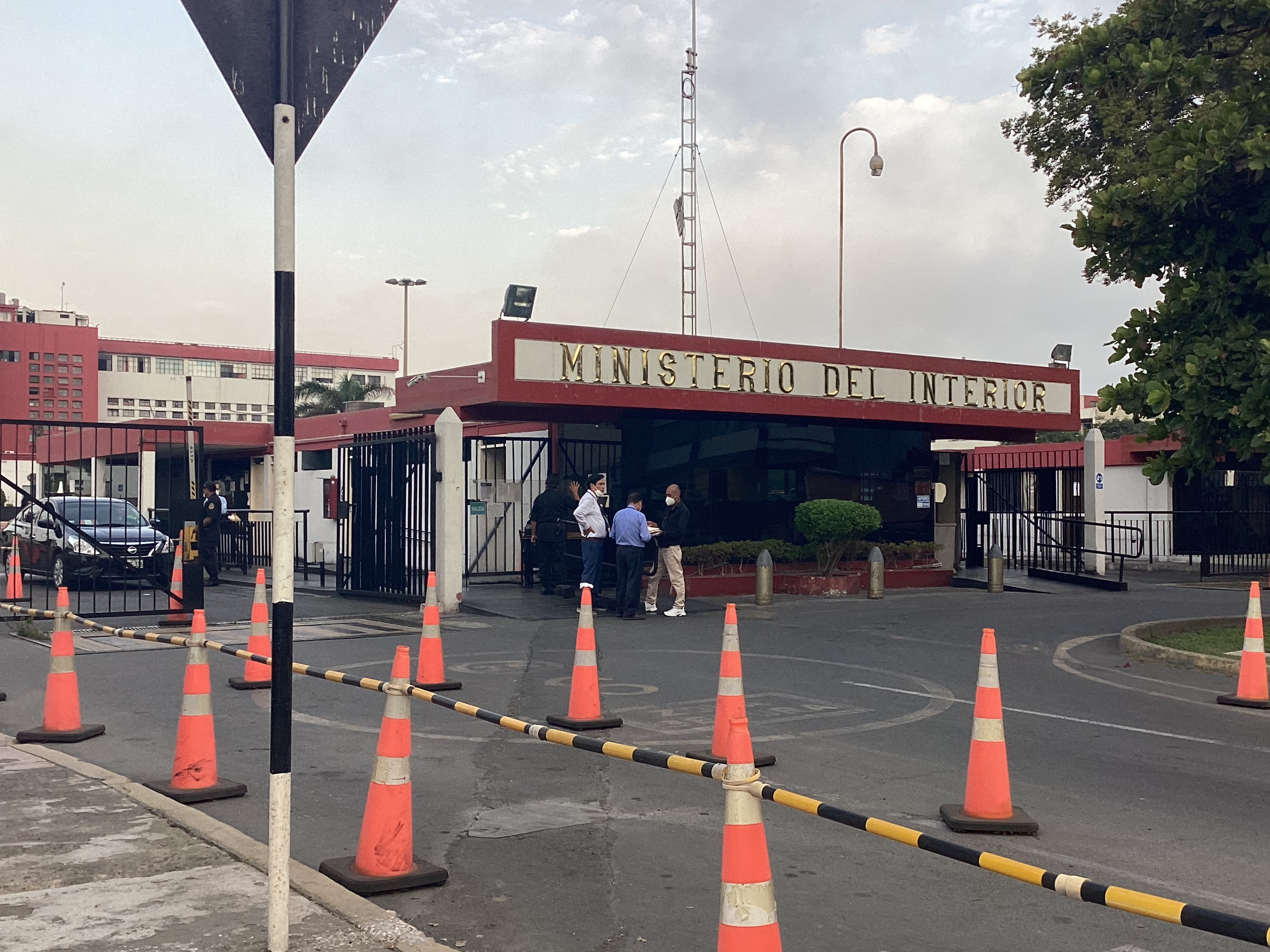

Agency overview
- Formed: April 30, 1873; 153 years ago
- Type: Ministry
- Jurisdiction: Government of Peru
- Headquarters: Plaza Treinta de Agosto 150, San Isidro District, Lima
- Agency executive: Julio Díaz Zulueta, Minister of the Interior
- Website: Official website

The Ministry of the Interior (Spanish: Ministerio del Interior, MININTER) is a ministry of the Government of Peru responsible for the administration of the internal order of the Peruvian State, as well as managing law enforcement units. Established in 1968 under the so-called Revolutionary Government, its headquarters are located, since July 1961, in San Isidro District, occupying the former premises of Limatambo International Airport.

The ministry's General Directorate of the Internal Government operates 26 regional prefectures, 186 pronvicial subprefectures and 1396 district prefectures. The latter are supported by over 158,000 ad honorem lieutenant governors.

As of March 24, 2025, it is headed by the Minister of the Interior Julio Díaz Zulueta.

== History ==
Prior to its establishment, it was preceded by the Ministry of Government, which took a number of names throughout its history:

- Ministry of Government, Justice and Worship (1855–1857)
- Ministry of Government, Worship and Public Works (1857–1860)
- Ministry of Government, Police and Public Works (1860–1896)
- Ministry of Government and Police (1896–1968)

Until 1961, it was housed in a building located on the southern side of Italy Square, in Barrios Altos. It was then moved to the former premises of Limatambo International Airport, in San Isidro District. It was officially renamed under the Revolutionary Government of Juan Velasco Alvarado, through Law Decree No. 17271, on December 3, 1968.

As an administrating power of the law enforcement system, it organised the Civil Guard, the Republican Guard and the Peruvian Investigative Police, until their gradual incorporation into a single police corps from 1988 to 1991.

== Organisation ==
- Minister of the Interior
  - Cabinet of Senior Management Advisors
  - General Directorate of the National Police of Peru
  - Institutional Control Body
  - Police Disciplinary Tribunal
  - General Office of Institutional Integrity
  - Public Prosecutor's Office in charge of the Interior Sector
  - Public Prosecutor's Office Specialized in Drug Trafficking Crimes
  - Public Prosecutor's Office Specialized in Terrorism Crimes
  - Public Prosecutor's Office Specialized in Crimes against Public Order
  - Public Prosecutor's Office Specialized in Money Laundering Crimes and Forfeiture Process
  - Public Prosecutor's Office Specialized in Organized Crime Crimes
  - Office of National Security and Defence
  - General Office of Social Communication and Institutional Image
  - Police Ombudsman's Office
  - General Office of Sectoral Strategic Planning
  - Health Insurance Fund of the National Police of Peru
- General Secretariat
  - General Office of Legal Counsel
  - General Office of Planning and Budget
  - General Office of Administration
  - General Office of Human Resources Management
  - General Office of Information and Communications Technology
  - General Office of Infrastructure
- Viceministry of Public Security
  - General Directorate of Intelligence
  - General Directorate Against Organised Crime
  - General Directorate of Public Order
  - General Directorate of the Internal Government
- Viceministry of Internal Order
  - General Directorate of Citizen Security
  - General Directorate of Democratic Security
  - General Directorate of Information for Security

Entities administered by the ministry include:

- The National Intendancy of Firefighters and its General Corps of Volunteer Firefighters.
- The National Police of Peru.
- The National Superintendence of Migration
- The National Superintendence for the Control of Security Services, Weapons, Ammunition, and Explosives for Civil Use (SUCAMEC)

== List of ministers ==
Name	Party	Period	
Name	Party	Term start	Term end
Ministers of Government, Justice and Worship (1855–1857)
Juan Manuel del Mar	—N/a	December 1855	October 24, 1856
Jervasio Álvarez	—N/a	October 24, 1856	December 31, 1856
Ministers of Government, Worship and Public Works (1857–1860)
Ignacio de Osma (Note: Did not take office (absent). His absence led to his replacement soon after.)	—N/a	February 14, 1857	April 1, 1857
Juan Manuel del Mar	—N/a	April 1, 1857	July 13, 1858
Manuel Morales	—N/a	July 13, 1858	September 28, 1859
Miguel del Carpio	—N/a	September 28, 1859	January 31, 1860
Ministers of Government, Police and Public Works (1860–1896)
José Melgar	—N/a	January 31, 1860	
Manuel Morales	—N/a	March 29, 1860	
Antonio Arenas	—N/a	October 24, 1862	
Manuel Freyre	—N/a	April 10, 1863	
Cipriano Coronel	—N/a	August 5, 1863	
Manuel Costas	—N/a	August 11, 1864	
Evaristo Gómez-Sánchez	—N/a	October 14, 1864	
Francisco Javier Mariátegui	—N/a	November 6, 1865	
José María Químper (Note: As Secretary.)	—N/a	November 27, 1865	
Manuel María Rivas	—N/a	January 30, 1867	
Juan Miguel Gálvez	Military	March 2, 1867	
Carlos Lissón	—N/a	May 4, 1867	
Pedro José Saavedra	—N/a	June 3, 1867	
Antonio Arenas	—N/a	January 26, 1868	
Antonio Gutiérrez de la Fuente	Military	February 7, 1868	
Pedro Gálvez	—N/a	August 2, 1868	
Manuel Ferreyros	Navy	April 13, 1869	
Rafael Velarde	—N/a	July 27, 1869	
Francisco de Paula Secada	Military	October 22, 1869	
Manuel Santa María	Military	June 28, 1870	
Manuel Morales	—N/a	August 2, 1872	
Francisco Rosas	Civil Party	August 2, 1872	
Ricardo Espinoza	—N/a	September 28, 1874	
Aurelio García	Navy	February 1, 1875	
Manuel Benavides	—N/a	August 2, 1876	
Manuel González	Military	August 26, 1876	
Juan Buendía	Military	June 4, 1877	
Fernando Palacios	—N/a	June 10, 1878	
Manuel Yrigoyen (Note: Interim.)	—N/a	October 19, 1879	
Bruno Bueno	—N/a	October 25, 1878	
Juan Corrales Melgar	—N/a	October 17, 1878	
Rafael Velarde	—N/a	May 17, 1879	
Juan E. Guzmán	—N/a	October 16, 1879	
Rafael Velarde	—N/a	October 28, 1879	October 29, 1879
Aurelio Denegri	—N/a	October 29, 1879	
Buenaventura Elguera	—N/a	November 1, 1879	
Nemecio Orbegoso	—N/a	December 24, 1879	
Manuel Velarde	Military	March 12, 1881	
Camilo Carrillo	Navy	September 4, 1882	
Manuel Velarde (Note: Representing the government based in Arequipa during the War of the Pacific.)	Military	January 1883	
Federico Herrera	—N/a	April 1883	
Lorenzo Iglesias (Note: As "Minister-General" (representing the ministries of Government, Police, Public Works, Statistics, and War and Navy) of his brother's government in Cajamarca during the War of the Pacific, which would be legitimised by the Chilean government throughout the year.)	—N/a	January 3, 1883	
Martín Dulanto	—N/a	August 27, 1883	
Mariano de Castro	—N/a	November 20, 1882	
Ignacio de Osma	—N/a	April 8, 1884	
Juan de Aliaga y Puente	—N/a	August 11, 1884	
Joaquín Iglesias	—N/a	April 14, 1885	
José Eusebio Sánchez	—N/a	December 3, 1885	
Pedro Alejandrino del Solar	—N/a	June 3, 1886	
Manuel Velarde	Military	October 6, 1886	
Pedro Alejandrino del Solar	Constitutional Party	November 22, 1886	
Rufino Torrico	Military	August 22, 1887	
Enrique Caravedo	—N/a	October 4, 1887	
Aurelio Denegri	—N/a	November 8, 1887	
José Mariano Jiménez	—N/a	March 8, 1889	
Pedro Alejandrino del Solar	Constitutional Party	April 4, 1889	
Guillermo Ferreyros	Military	February 11, 1890	
Mariano Valcárcel	—N/a	August 10, 1890	
Francisco Gerardo Chávez	—N/a	July 25, 1891	
Federico Herrera	—N/a	August 24, 1891	
Juan Ibarra	Constitutional Party	May 2, 1892	
Carlos Maria Elías	Constitutional Party	June 30, 1892	
Manuel Velarde	Military	March 3, 1893	
Pedro José Zavala	—N/a	May 11, 1893	
Alfredo Gastón	—N/a	September 28, 1893	
Guillermo Ferreyros	Military	April 1, 1894	
Cesáreo Chacaltana	Civil Party	August 10, 1894	
José Salvador Cavero	Constitutional Party	November 16, 1894	
Ricardo Espinoza	—N/a	March 20, 1895	
Antonio Bentín	Democratic Party	September 8, 1895	
Benjamín Boza	Democratic Party	November 30, 1895	
Ministers of Government and Police (1896–1968)
Benjamín Boza	Democratic Party	November 30, 1895	
José María de la Puente	Democratic Party	August 8, 1896	
Lorenzo Arrieta	Democratic Party	August 19, 1896	
Alejandro López de Romaña	Democratic Party	November 25, 1897	
José María de la Puente	Democratic Party	December 23, 1897	
Domingo Parra	Military	September 8, 1899	
Enrique Coronel Zegarra	Democratic Party	August 7, 1900	
Ernesto Zapata	Military	October 2, 1900	
Leonidas Cárdenas	—N/a	September 11, 1901	
Alejandro Deustua	—N/a	August 9, 1902	
Rafael Fernández de Villanueva	Civil Party	November 4, 1902	
Juan de Dios de la Quintana	—	September 8, 1903	May 14, 1904
Juan de Dios de la Quintana	—	May 14, 1904	
Eulogio Romero	—N/a	September 24, 1904	
Ernesto Zapata	Military	February 19, 1906	
Amador del Solar	National Coalition	July 31, 1906	
Hernán Velarde	—N/a	August 20, 1906	
Agustín Tovar	Civil Party	May 11, 1907	
Germán Arenas	Civil Party	October 9, 1907	
Miguel Abraham Rojas	—N/a	September 24, 1908	
Rafael Villanueva Cortez	Civil Party	June 8, 1909	
Javier Prado	Civil Party	March 14, 1910	
José Manuel García	Civil Party	August 3, 1910	
Enrique Basadre	—N/a	November 3, 1910	
Juan de Dios Salazar	Civil Party	August 31, 1911	
Plácido Jiménez	—N/a	October 16, 1911	
Elías Malpartida	Democratic Party	September 24, 1912	
Abel I. Montes	—N/a	December 24, 1912	
Federico Luna	Civic Union	February 24, 1913	
Aurelio Sousa	Democratic Party	June 17, 1913	
Gonzalo Tirado	—N/a	July 23, 1913	
Arturo Osores	Constitutional Party	February 4, 1914	
Hildebrando Fuentes		May 16, 1914	
Fernando Fuchs	—N/a	August 22, 1914	
Víctor R. Benavides	—N/a	February 19, 1915	
Luis Julio Menéndez	—N/a	August 18, 1915	
José Manuel García	Civil Party	August 2, 1916	
Ezequiel Muñoz	—N/a	March 7, 1917	
Germán Arenas	Civil Party	July 27, 1917	
Samuel Sayán y Palacios	—N/a	February 26, 1918	
Clemente Revilla	Civil Party	September 2, 1918	
Germán Arenas	Civil Party	December 18, 1918	
Óscar Mavila Ruiz	—N/a	April 26, 1919	
Mariano Cornejo	Democratic Party	July 4, 1919	
Alejandrino Maguiña	—N/a	August 24, 1919	
Germán Leguía	—N/a	December 6, 1919	
Pedro José Rada	—N/a	October 8, 1922	
Jesús Salazar	Reformist Democratic Party	October 12, 1924	
José Manuel García	Reformist Democratic Party	August 2, 1926	
Celestino Manchego	Reformist Democratic Party	December 26, 1926	
Arturo Rubio	—N/a	December 24, 1927	
Benjamín Huamán	—N/a	October 12, 1929	
Roberto López	—N/a	August 24, 1930	
Eulogio Castillo	Military	August 25, 1930	
Gustavo Jiménez	Military	August 27, 1930	
Antonio Beingolea	Military	November 24, 1930	
Francisco Tamayo	Decentralist Party	March 11, 1931	
José Manuel García	Civil Party	December 8, 1931	
Luis A. Flores	Revolutionary Union	February 29, 1932	
Julio Chávez	—	May 20, 1932	April 30, 1933
Julio Chávez	—	April 30, 1933	
Jorge Prado	Conservative Coalition	June 26, 1933	
Alfredo Henriod	Military	November 26, 1933	
Antonio Rodríguez	Military	May 21, 1935	
Diómedes Arias-Schreiber	—N/a	March 20, 1939	
Guillermo Garrido Lecca	—N/a	December 8, 1939	
Ricardo de la Puente	—N/a	May 21, 1942	
Rafael Belaúnde	National Democratic Front	July 28, 1945	
Manuel E. Rodríguez	Military	January 23, 1946	
Manuel A. Odría	Military	January 12, 1947	
Julio César Villegas Cerro		June 17, 1948	
Augusto Villacorta Álvarez		November 3, 1948	
Ricardo de la Puente	—N/a	July 28, 1950	
Augusto Romero	—N/a	March 20, 1952	
Alejandro Esparza	—N/a	September 16, 1955	
Augusto Villacorta Álvarez	—N/a	December 22, 1955	
Jorge Fernández	—N/a	July 28, 1956	
Carlos Carrillo	—N/a	April 7, 1958	
Ricardo Elías	—N/a	June 16, 1960	
Juan Bossio Collae	—N/a	July 18, 1962	
Germán Pagador Blondet	—N/a	October 10, 1962	
Óscar Trelles	Popular Action	July 28, 1963	
Juan Languasco	Popular Action	January 1, 1964	
Miguel Rotalde	Navy	July 27, 1964	
Octavio Mongrut	Popular Action	August 1, 1965	
Javier Alva	Popular Action	September 15, 1965	
Luis Alayza Escardó	Popular Action	October 26, 1966	
Luis Ponce	Navy	July 9, 1967	
Carlos Velarde	Popular Action	June 2, 1968	
Manuel Velarde	Popular Action	October 2, 1968	October 3, 1968
Ministers of the Interior
Armando Artola	Military	October 3, 1968	May 18, 1971
Pedro Richter	Military	May 18, 1971	September 3, 1975
César Campos Quesada	Military	September 3, 1975	February 1, 1976
Luis Cisneros Vizquerra	Military	February 1, 1976	May 12, 1978
Fernando Velit Sabattini	Military	February 15, 1978	May 7, 1980
César Iglesias Barrón	Military	May 7, 1980	July 28, 1980
José María de la Jara	Popular Action	July 28, 1980	October 30, 1981
José Gagliardi	Air Force	October 30, 1981	January 3, 1983
Fernando Rincón	Popular Action	January 3, 1983	March 21, 1983
Luis Pércovich	Popular Action	March 21, 1983	October 15, 1984
Óscar Brush	Military	October 15, 1984	July 28, 1985
Abel Salinas	APRA	July 28, 1985	June 29, 1987
José Barsallo	APRA	June 29, 1987	May 15, 1988
Juan E. Soria Díaz	APRA	May 15, 1988	March 2, 1989
Armando Villanueva	APRA	March 2, 1989	May 12, 1989
Agustín Mantilla	APRA	May 12, 1989	July 28, 1990
Adolfo Alvarado Fournier	Military	July 28, 1990	April 2, 1991
Víctor Malca	Military	April 2, 1991	November 7, 1991
Juan Briones	Military	November 7, 1991	April 20, 1997
César Saucedo	Military	April 20, 1997	July 18, 1997
José Villanueva	Military	July 18, 1997	August 19, 1999
César Saucedo	Military	August 19, 1999	July 29, 2000
Walter Chacón	Military	July 29, 2000	October 28, 2000
Fernando Dianderas Ottone	Police	October 28, 2000	November 25, 2000
Ketín Vidal	Police	November 25, 2000	July 28, 2001
Fernando Rospigliosi	Possible Peru	July 28, 2001	July 12, 2002
Gino Costa	—N/a	July 12, 2002	January 27, 2003
Alberto Sanabria Ortiz	Possible Peru	January 27, 2003	July 25, 2003
Fernando Rospigliosi	Possible Peru	July 25, 2003	May 7, 2004
Javier Reátegui	Possible Peru	May 8, 2004	January 14, 2005
Félix Murazzo	Police	January 14, 2005	August 16, 2005
Rómulo Pizarro	Possible Peru	August 16, 2005	July 28, 2006
Pilar Mazzetti	—N/a	July 28, 2006	February 24, 2007
Luis Alva	APRA	February 27, 2007	October 14, 2008
Remigio Hernani	Police	October 14, 2008	February 19, 2009
Mercedes Cabanillas	APRA	February 19, 2009	July 19, 2009
Octavio Salazar	Police	July 19, 2009	September 12, 2010
Fernando Barrios	APRA	September 14, 2010	November 22, 2010
Miguel Hidalgo	Police	November 23, 2010	July 28, 2011
Óscar Valdés	Military	July 28, 2011	December 10, 2011
Daniel Lozada	—N/a	December 11, 2011	May 10, 2012
Wilver Calle	Military	May 14, 2012	July 23, 2012
Wilfredo Pedraza	—N/a	July 23, 2012	November 15, 2013
Walter Albán	—N/a	November 19, 2013	June 23, 2014
Daniel Urresti	Military	June 23, 2014	February 17, 2015
José Luis Pérez	—N/a	February 17, 2015	July 28, 2016
Carlos Basombrío	—N/a	July 28, 2016	December 22, 2017
Vicente Romero	Police	December 27, 2017	April 2, 2018
Mauro Medina	Police	April 2, 2018	October 17, 2018
Carlos Morán	Police	October 19, 2018	April 24, 2020
Gastón Rodríguez	Police	April 24, 2020	July 15, 2020
Jorge Montoya Pérez	Air Force	July 15, 2020	September 9, 2020
César Gentille	Police	September 10, 2020	November 10, 2020
Gastón Rodríguez	Police	November 12, 2020	November 17, 2020
Rubén Vargas Céspedes	—N/a	November 18, 2020	December 2, 2020
Cluber Aliaga	Police	December 2, 2020	December 7, 2020
José Elice	Purple Party	December 7, 2020	July 28, 2021
Juan Manuel Carrasco	Together for Peru	July 29, 2021	October 6, 2021
Luis Barranzuela	—N/a	October 6, 2021	November 3, 2021
Avelino Guillén	—N/a	November 4, 2021	January 30, 2022
Alfonso Chávarry	Police	February 1, 2022	May 22, 2022
Dimitri Senmache	—N/a	May 22, 2022	June 30, 2022
Mariano González	National Victory	July 4, 2022	July 19, 2022
Willy Huerta	—N/a	July 19, 2022	December 7, 2022
César Cervantes	Police	December 10, 2022	December 21, 2022
Víctor Rojas	Police	December 21, 2022	January 13, 2023
Vicente Romero	Police	January 13, 2023	November 17, 2023
Víctor Torres	Police	November 21, 2023	April 1, 2024
Walter Ortiz Acosta	Police	April 1, 2024	May 16, 2024
Juan José Santiváñez	—N/a	May 16, 2024	March 24, 2025
Julio Díaz Zulueta	Police	March 24, 2025	May 13, 2025
Carlos Malaver	Police	May 13, 2025	October 12, 2025
Vicente Tiburcio	Police	October 14, 2025	February 24, 2026
Hugo Begazo	Police	February 24, 2026	March 17, 2026
José Zapata Morante	Police	March 17, 2026	July 28, 2026

== See also ==
- List of ministries of Peru
