= Ministry of Justice and Human Rights (Peru) =

Government ministry of Peru

- Ministerio de Justicia y Derechos Humanos
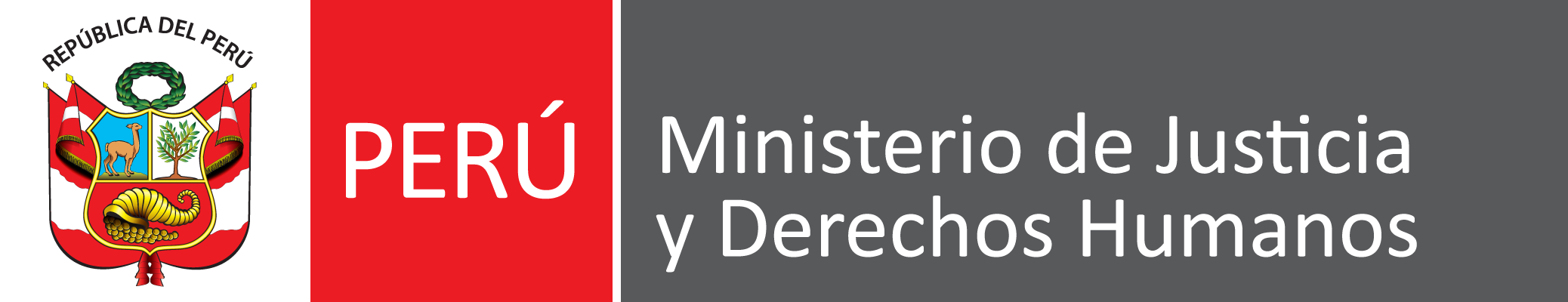

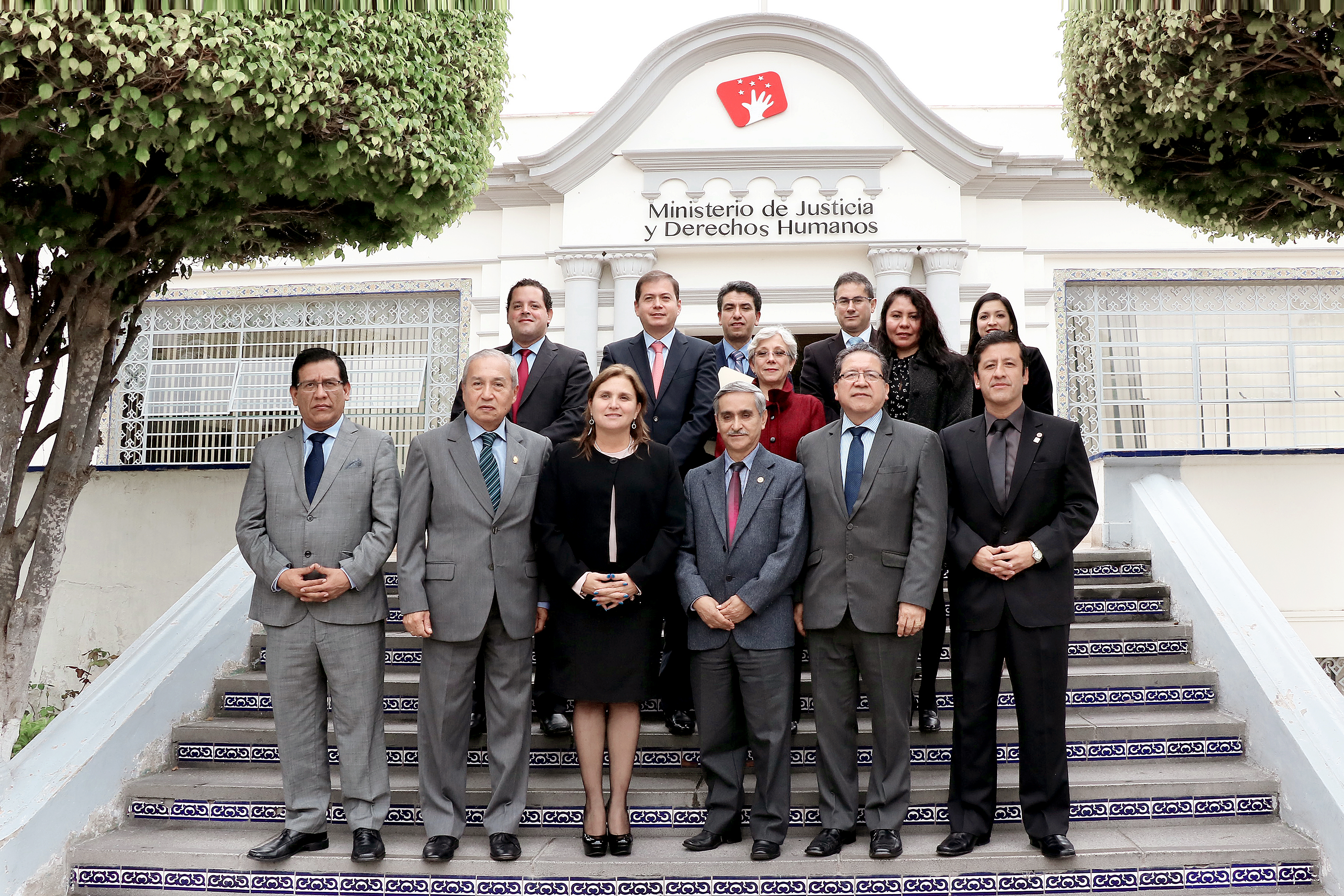

Agency overview
- Formed: 1826; 200 years ago
- Headquarters: 350 Scipión Llona, Miraflores, Lima
- Minister responsible: Juan Alcántara Medrano
- Website: www.gob.pe/minjus

The Ministry of Justice and Human Rights (Spanish: Ministerio de Justicia y Derechos Humanos, MINJUSDH) of Peru is the government ministry charged with advising the President of Peru in judicial matters. The ministry is responsible of the national prison system as well as the state's relationship with the Roman Catholic Church in Peru.

The minister of justice is Juan Alcántara Medrano since May 2025.

== History ==
In 2011, a Vice Ministry for Human Rights was created, resulting in the ministry adopting its current name.

== Organisation ==
- General Secretariat
- Vice Ministry of Justice
  - Directorate-General of Regulatory Development and Regulatory Quality
  - Directorate-General of Criminological Affairs
  - Directorate-General of Justice and Religious Freedom
  - Directorate-General of Transparency, Access to Public Information, and Personal Data Protection
- Vice Ministry of Human Rights and Access to Justice
  - Directorate-General of Public Defense and Access to Justice
  - Directorate-General of Human Rights
  - Directorate-General for the Search for Missing Persons

Entities administered by the ministry include:

- General Archive of the Nation (AGN)
- National Superintendent of Public Registration (SUNARP)
- National Penitentiary Institute (INPE)

== List of ministers ==
Minister	Term	President
Ministers of Foreign Affairs, Justice and Ecclesiastical Affairs (1845–1852)
José Gregorio Paz-Soldán y Ureta	1845–1848	Ramón Castilla
Matías León Cárdenas	1848	Ramón Castilla
Felipe Pardo y Aliaga	1848–1849	Ramón Castilla
Manuel Bartolomé Ferreyros de la Mata	1849	Ramón Castilla
Ministers of Justice, Instruction, Charity and Ecclesiastical Affairs (1852–1856)
Bartolomé Herrera Vélez	1851–1852	José Rufino Echenique
Agustín Guillermo Charún	1852–1853	José Rufino Echenique
José Manuel Tirado	1853	José Rufino Echenique
José Luis Gómez-Sánchez Rivero	1853	José Rufino Echenique
Blas José Alzamora Seminario	1854–1855	José Rufino Echenique
Pedro Gálvez Egúsquiza	1855	José Rufino Echenique
Juan Manuel del Mar Bernedo	1855	José Rufino Echenique
Ministers of Justice, Instruction and Charity (1856–1862)
Jervasio Álvarez y Montaño	1856–1857	Ramón Castilla
Luciano María Cano y Dávila	1857–1859	Ramón Castilla
José Fabio Melgar Valdivieso	1859–1860	Ramón Castilla
Juan Oviedo	1860–1862	Ramón Castilla
Ministers of Justice, Instruction, Worship and Charity (1862–1896)
[icon]
Manuel Pablo Olaechea	1896–1897	Nicolás de Piérola
José Antonio de Lavalle y Pardo	1897–1898	Nicolás de Piérola
José Jorge Loayza	1898–1899	Nicolás de Piérola
Eleodoro Romero Salcedo	1899–1900	Eduardo López de Romaña
Ezequiel Vega	1900	Eduardo López de Romaña
Pedro Carlos Olaechea	1900	Eduardo López de Romaña
Rafael Villanueva Cortez	1900–1901	Eduardo López de Romaña
Anselmo Barreto León	1901	Eduardo López de Romaña
Lizardo Alzamora Mayo	1901–1902	Eduardo López de Romaña
José Viterbo Arias	1902	Eduardo López de Romaña
Telémaco Orihuela	1902	Eduardo López de Romaña
Francisco José Eguiguren Escudero	1903–1904	Manuel Candamo
Jorge Polar Vargas	1904–1906	José Pardo (1.º gov.)
Carlos A. Washburn Salas	1906–1908	José Pardo (1.º gov.)
Manuel Vicente Villarán Godoy	1908–1909	Augusto B. Leguía (1.º gov.)
Matías León Baltazara	1909–1910	Augusto B. Leguía (1.º gov.)
Antonio Flores Rondón	1910	Augusto B. Leguía (1.º gov.)
José Salvador Cavero Ovalle	1910	Augusto B. Leguía (1.º gov.)
Antonio Flores Rondón	1910	Augusto B. Leguía (1.º gov.)
Ministers of Justice, Instruction, Worship and Charity (1911–1935)
Agustín G. Ganoza y Cavero	1911–1912	Augusto B. Leguía (1.º gov.)
Francisco Moreyra y Riglos	1912–1913	Guillermo Billinghurst
Alfredo Solf y Muro	1913	Guillermo Billinghurst
Carlos Paz Soldán y Benavides	1913–1914	Guillermo Billinghurst
Rafael Grau Cavero	1914	Óscar R. Benavides (1.º gov.)
Luis Julio Menéndez	1914	Óscar R. Benavides (1.º gov.)
Aurelio Sousa y Matute	1914	Óscar R. Benavides (1.º gov.)
Daniel Isaac Castillo	1914–1915	Óscar R. Benavides (1.º gov.)
Plácido Jiménez	1915	Óscar R. Benavides (1.º gov.)
Wenceslao Valera Olano	1915–1917	José Pardo (2.º gov.)
Ricardo L. Flores Gaviño	1917–1918	José Pardo (2.º gov.)
Ángel Gustavo Cornejo Bouroncle	1918–1919	José Pardo (2.º gov.)
Federico Panizo Orbegoso	1919	José Pardo (2.º gov.)
Arturo Osores Cabrera	1919	Augusto B. Leguía (2.º gov.)
Alberto Salomón Osorio	1919–1920	Augusto B. Leguía (2.º gov.)
Óscar C. Barrós Mesinas	1920–1922	Augusto B. Leguía (2.º gov.)
Julio E. Ego-Aguirre	1922–1924	Augusto B. Leguía (2.º gov.)
Alejandrino Maguiña	1924–1926	Augusto B. Leguía (2.º gov.)
Pedro M. Oliveira	1926–1929	Augusto B. Leguía (2.º gov.)
J. Matías León Carrera	1929–1930	Augusto B. Leguía (2.º gov.)
José Angel Escalante	1930	Augusto B. Leguía (2.º gov.)
Arturo Zapata Vélez	1930	Manuel M. Ponce B. (Junta Militar)
Armando Sologuren	1930	Luis Sánchez Cerro (Junta Militar)
José Luis Bustamante y Rivero	1930–1931	Luis Sánchez Cerro (Junta Militar)
Elías Lozada Benavente	1931	Luis Sánchez Cerro (Junta Militar)
José Gálvez Barrenechea	1931	David Samanez Ocampo (Junta Nacional)
Guillermo Garrido Lecca	1931–1932	David Samanez Ocampo (Junta Nacional)
Eufrasio Álvarez	1932	Luis Sánchez Cerro
Carlos Sayán Álvarez	1932	Luis Sánchez Cerro
Ricardo Rivadeneira Barnuevo	1932	Luis Sánchez Cerro
Alberto Ballón Landa	1932	Luis Sánchez Cerro
Wenceslao Delgado	1932	Luis Sánchez Cerro
Wenceslao Delgado	1932–1933	Óscar R. Benavides (2.º gov.)
Daniel Olaechea y Olaechea	1933	Óscar R. Benavides (2.º gov.)
José de la Riva Agüero y Osma	1933–1934	Óscar R. Benavides (2.º gov.)
Alberto Rey de Castro y Romaña	1934	Óscar R. Benavides (2.º gov.)
Carlos Arenas y Loayza	1934–1935	Óscar R. Benavides (2.º gov.)
Ernesto Montagne Markholz	1935	Óscar R. Benavides (2.º gov.)
Ministers of Justice and Worship (1935–1942)
Wenceslao Delgado	1935–1936	Óscar R. Benavides (2.º gov.)
Diómedes Arias Schreiber	1936	Óscar R. Benavides (2.º gov.)
Felipe de la Barra	1936–1937	Óscar R. Benavides (2.º gov.)
Diómedes Arias Schreiber	1937–1939	Óscar R. Benavides (2.º gov.)
Guillermo Almenara Irigoyen	1939	Óscar R. Benavides (2.º gov.)
José Félix Aramburú y Salinas	1939	Óscar R. Benavides (2.º gov.)
Mariano Lino Cornejo	1939–1942	Manuel Prado Ugarteche (1.º gov.)
Ministers of Ministers of Justice and Labour (1942–1949)
Mariano Lino Cornejo	1939–1943	Manuel Prado Ugarteche (1.º gov.)
Manuel C. Gallagher y Canaval	1943–1944	Manuel Prado Ugarteche (1.º gov.)
Manuel Cisneros Sánchez	1944–1945	Manuel Prado Ugarteche (1.º gov.)
Luis Alayza y Paz Soldán	1945	José Luis Bustamante y Rivero
Ismael Bielich Flores	1945–1947	José Luis Bustamante y Rivero
José R. Alzamora Freundt	1947	José Luis Bustamante y Rivero
Armando Artola del Pozo	1947–1948	José Luis Bustamante y Rivero
Alejandro Villalobos Carranza	1948	José Luis Bustamante y Rivero
José León Barandiarán	1948	José Luis Bustamante y Rivero
Marcial Merino	1948–1949	Junta Militar
Armando Artola del Pozo	1949	Junta Militar
Ministers of Justice and Worship (1949–1981)
Augusto Romero Lovo	1949–1950	Junta Militar
Alberto Freundt Rosell	1950–1952	Manuel A. Odría
Alejandro Freundt Rosell	1952–1955	Manuel A. Odría
Félix Huamán Izquierdo	1955–1956	Manuel A. Odría
Augusto Thorndike Galup	1956–1958	Manuel Prado Ugarteche (2.º gov.)
Manuel Cisneros Sánchez	1958	Manuel Prado Ugarteche (2.º gov.)
Ulises Montoya Manfredi	1958–1959	Manuel Prado Ugarteche (2.º gov.)
Raúl Gómez de la Torre Tamayo	1959–1960	Manuel Prado Ugarteche (2.º gov.)
José Merino Reyna	1960–1961	Manuel Prado Ugarteche (2.º gov.)
Geraldo Arosemena Garland	1961–1962	Manuel Prado Ugarteche (2.º gov.)
Juan Orrego Aguinaga	1962–1963	Junta de govierno
Luis Bedoya Reyes	1963	Fernando Belaunde Terry (1.º gov.)
Emilio Llosa Ricketts	1963–1965	Fernando Belaunde Terry (1.º gov.)
Carlos Fernández Sesarego	1965	Fernando Belaunde Terry (1.º gov.)
Valentín Paniagua Corazao	1965–1966	Fernando Belaunde Terry (1.º gov.)
Roberto Ramírez del Villar Beaumont	1966	Fernando Belaunde Terry (1.º gov.)
Javier de Belaúnde Ruiz de Somocurcio	1966–1967	Fernando Belaunde Terry (1.º gov.)
Luis Rodríguez Mariátegui Proaño	1967	Fernando Belaunde Terry (1.º gov.)
José Morales Urresti	1967–1968	Fernando Belaunde Terry (1.º gov.)
Luis Lazarte Ferreyros	1968	Fernando Belaunde Terry (1.º gov.)
Guillermo Hoyos Osores	1968	Fernando Belaunde Terry (1.º gov.)
Elías Mendoza Habersperger	1968	Fernando Belaunde Terry (1.º gov.)
Alfonso Navarro Romero	1968–1969	Juan Velasco Alvarado
Luis Vargas Caballero	1969–1975	Juan Velasco Alvarado
Felipe Osterling Parodi	1980–1981	Fernando Belaunde Terry
Ministers of Justice (1981–2011)
Enrique Elías Laroza	1981–1982	Fernando Belaunde Terry (2.º gov.)
Armando Buendía Gutiérrez	1982–1983	Fernando Belaunde Terry (2.º gov.)
Ernesto Alayza Grundy	1983–1984	Fernando Belaunde Terry (2.º gov.)
Max Arias-Schreiber Pezet	1984	Fernando Belaunde Terry (2.º gov.)
Alberto Musso Vento	1984–1985	Fernando Belaunde Terry (2.º gov.)
Luis Gonzales Posada	1985–1986	Alan García (1.º gov.)
Carlos Blancas Bustamante	1986–1988	Alan García (1.º gov.)
Gonzalo Durand Aspíllaga	1988	Alan García (1.º gov.)
Camilo Carrillo Gómez	1988	Alan García (1.º gov.)
César Delgado Barreto	1988–1989	Alan García (1.º gov.)
María Bockos Heredia de Grillo [1st female]	1989–1990	Alan García (1.º gov.)
Joffré Fernández Valdivieso	1990	Alan García (1.º gov.)
Augusto Antonioli Vásquez	1990–1991	Alberto Fujimori
Fernando Vega Santa Gadea	1991–1996	Alberto Fujimori
Carlos Eduardo Hermoza Moya	1996–1997	Alberto Fujimori
Alfredo Quispe Correa	1997–1999	Alberto Fujimori
María Carlota Valenzuela de Puelles	1999	Alberto Fujimori
Jorge Bustamante Romero	1999	Alberto Fujimori
Alberto Bustamante Belaunde	1999–2000	Alberto Fujimori
Diego García-Sayán Larrabure	2000–2001	Valentín Paniagua
Fernando Olivera Vega	2001–2002	Alejandro Toledo
Fausto Alvarado Dodero	2002–2004	Alejandro Toledo
Baldo Kresalja Roselló	2004	Alejandro Toledo
Carlos Gamarra Ugaz	2004–2005	Alejandro Toledo
Eduardo Salhuana Cavides	2005	Alejandro Toledo
Alejandro Tudela Chopitea	2005–2006	Alejandro Toledo
María Zavala Valladares	2006–2007	Alan García (2.º gov.)
Rosario Fernández Figueroa	2007–2009	Alan García (2.º gov.)
Aurelio Pastor	2009–2010	Alan García (2.º gov.)
Víctor García Toma	2010	Alan García (2.º gov.)
Rosario Fernández Figueroa	2010–2011	Alan García (2.º gov.)
Francisco Eguiguren Praeli	2011	Ollanta Humala
Ministers of Justice and Human Rights
Juan Jiménez Mayor	2011–2012	Ollanta Humala
Eda Adriana Rivas Franchini	2012–2013	Ollanta Humala
Daniel Augusto Figallo Rivadeneyra	2013–2015	Ollanta Humala
Fredy Otárola Peñaranda	2015	Ollanta Humala
Gustavo Adrianzén Olaya	2015	Ollanta Humala
Aldo Alejandro Vásquez Ríos	2015–2016	Ollanta Humala
María Soledad Pérez Tello de Rodríguez	2016–2017	Pedro Pablo Kuczynski
Enrique Mendoza Ramírez	2017–2018	Pedro Pablo Kuczynski
Salvador Heresi Chicoma	2018	Martín Vizcarra
Vicente Zeballos Salinas	2018–2019	Martín Vizcarra
Ana Teresa Revilla	2019–2020	Martín Vizcarra
Fernando Castañeda Portocarrero	2020	Martín Vizcarra
Eduardo Vega Luna	2020	Manuel Merino
Delia Muñoz	2020–2021	Francisco Sagasti
Aníbal Torres	2021–2022	Pedro Castillo
Ángel Yldefonso	2022	Pedro Castillo
Félix Chero	2022	Pedro Castillo
José Tello Alfaro	2022–2023	Dina Boluarte
Daniel Maurate Romero	2023	Dina Boluarte
Eduardo Arana Ysa	2023–2025	Dina Boluarte
Juan Alcántara Medrano	2025–present	Dina Boluarte

== See also ==
- Council of Ministers of Peru
- Justice ministry
- National Police of Peru
