= Wilfredo Pedraza =

Peruvian lawyer and politician

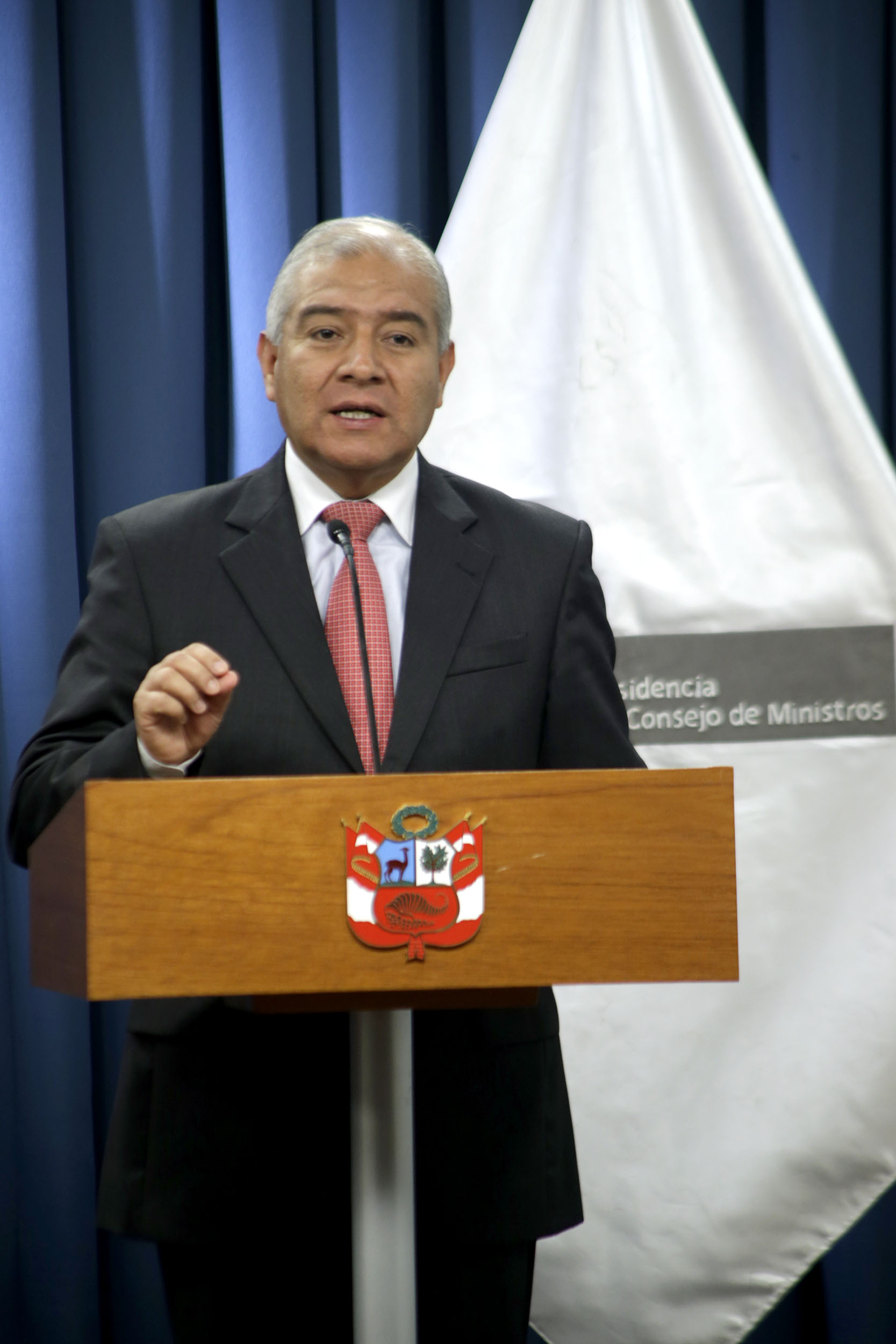

Minister of Interior
- In office 24 July 2012 – 31 October 2013
- President: Ollanta Humala
- Prime Minister: Juan Jimenez
- Preceded by: Wilver Calle Girón
- Succeeded by: Walter Albán

Personal details
- Born: 30 September 1960 (age 66) Andahuaylas, Peru
- Party: Peruvian Nationalist Party (2020-present)
- Education: University of San Martín de Porres

Gerónimo Wilfredo Pedraza Sierra (born 30 September 1960) is a Peruvian lawyer and politician. He served as interior minister of Peru from July 2012 to 31 October 2013.

== Career ==
Pedraza is a lawyer by profession. His speciality in the field of law is criminal system and citizen security. He served as the coordinator of the special investigations unit of the truth and reconciliation commission. He headed Peru's prison system, the national penitentiary institute, for two terms. He was appointed interior minister in a reshuffle on 24 July 2012 to the cabinet led by prime minister Juan Jimenez. Pedraza, an independent politician, succeeded Wilver Calle Girón in the post. Calle had been in office since 15 May 2012.

In March 2013, Pedraza and other senior officials including President Ollanta Humala were harshly criticised due to government's ineffective combat against crime in the country.

Asked for his opinion regarding the population's claim for the growing wave of crime and violence that is hitting the capital, Pedraza said that insecurity was only a matter of "sensation", an expression that was harshly criticized, although months later it was it retracted and recognized that insecurity was not just a perception but "a real problem".

On 15 November 2013, the opposition presented a motion of censure against Pedraza for the scandal that compromised the National Police for the undue protection provided to the house of Óscar López Meneses, former political operator of Vladimiro Montesinos at the time of Fujimorism. He resigned immediately, without waiting for the vote of censure. In his resignation letter, he gave an account of his management, highlighting the expansion and equipping of the police stations, as well as the modernization of the Criminalistics Directorate of the National Police of Peru.
