= Víctor Torres Falcón =

Peruvian politician

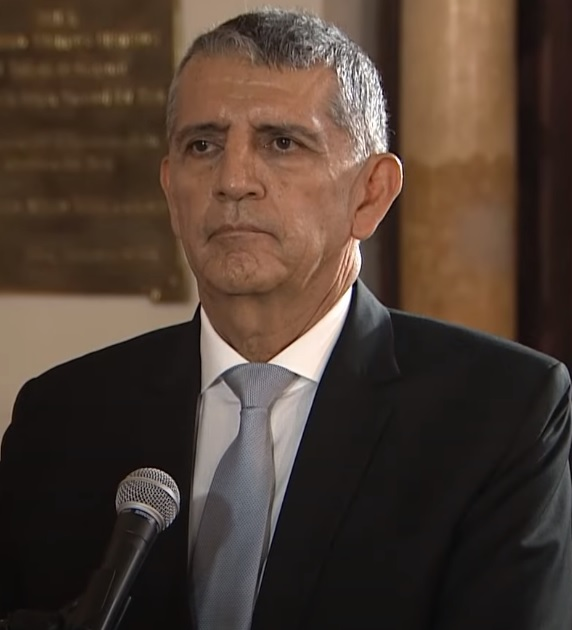

Minister of the Interior
- In office 21 November 2023 – 1 April 2024
- President: Dina Boluarte
- Prime Minister: Alberto Otárola; Gustavo Adrianzén
- Preceded by: Vicente Romero Fernández
- Succeeded by: Walter Ortiz Acosta

Víctor Manuel Torres Falcón is a Peruvian politician serving as the Minister of the Interior of Peru under the administration of president Dina Boluarte, since 21 November 2023.

== Career ==
Falcón had previously served as the Chief of the Ica Police Region and of the Police Front of the Valley of the Apurímac, Ene and Mantaro rivers (Vraem). He was also Director of Education and Doctrine of the Police, Director of Institutional Management of the PNP, and Chief of Staff.

=== Minister of the State ===
On 21 November 2023, he was appointed and sworn in by President Dina Boluarte as Peru's Minister of the Interior.
