= Ghitis =

Ghitis is a surname. Notable people with the surname include:

- Salomón Lerner Ghitis (born 1946), Peruvian businessman and politician
