= Eda Rivas =

Peruvian lawyer and politician

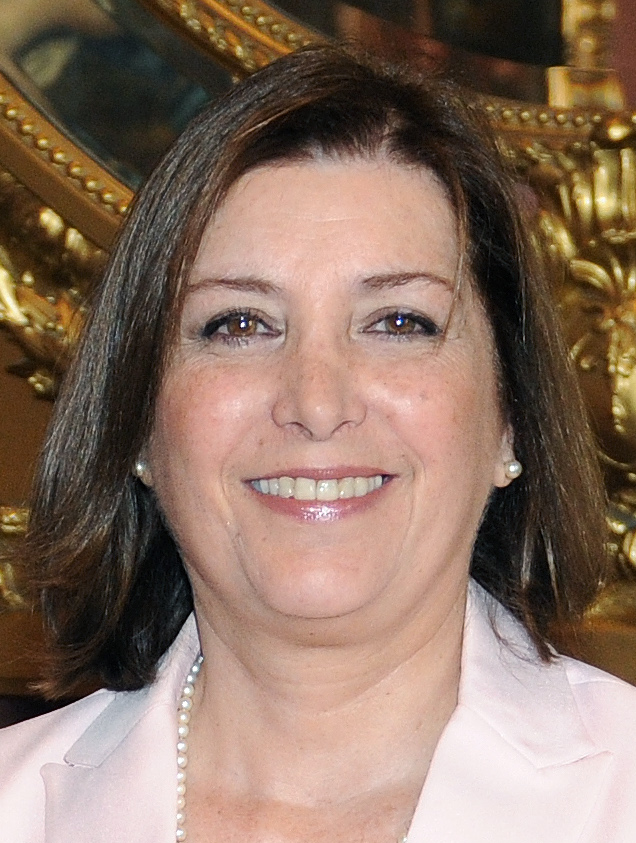

Ambassador of Peru to Italy
- In office April 16, 2015 – September 29, 2016
- Preceded by: Alfredo Arosemena
- Succeeded by: Luis Iberico Núñez

Minister of Foreign Relations
- In office May 15, 2013 – June 23, 2014
- President: Ollanta Humala
- Prime Minister: Juan Jiménez Mayor; César Villanueva; René Cornejo
- Preceded by: Rafael Roncagliolo
- Succeeded by: Gonzalo Gutiérrez Reinel

Minister of Justice and Human Rights
- In office July 23, 2012 – May 15, 2013
- President: Ollanta Humala
- Prime Minister: Juan Jiménez Mayor
- Preceded by: Juan Jiménez Mayor
- Succeeded by: Daniel Figallo

Deputy Minister of Justice
- In office December 16, 2011 – July 23, 2012
- President: Ollanta Humala
- Prime Minister: Óscar Valdés
- Minister: Juan Jiménez Mayor
- Preceded by: Juan Jiménez Mayor
- Succeeded by: Daniel Figallo

Personal details
- Born: March 23, 1952 (age 74) Lima, Peru
- Party: Independent
- Spouse: Diego García Sayán
- Children: 3
- Education: Pontifical Catholic University of Peru (LLB); University of Castilla–La Mancha (MA); University of Las Palmas de Gran Canaria (MA)
- Occupation: Politician
- Profession: Lawyer

Eda Adriana Rivas Franchini (born March 23, 1952) is a Peruvian lawyer and politician. She served as Minister of Justice and Human Rights from 2012 to 2013, and Minister of Foreign Relations from 2012 to 2013, under president Ollanta Humala.

== Early life and education ==
Eda Rivas was born in Lima on March 23, 1952. She graduated in law from the Pontifical Catholic University of Peru. Additionally, she completed a postgraduate specialization in Public Services Management from the University of Castilla-La Mancha in Spain, and also obtained a postgraduate specialization in Infrastructure Regulation from the Public Service at the University of Las Palmas de Gran Canaria.

Rivas was married to the jurist Diego García-Sayán Larrabure, former president and current judge of the Inter-American Court of Human Rights, with whom she has three children: Enrique Diego (b. 1979), Gonzalo Alonso (b. 1981) and Rodrigo Aurelio (b. 1983).

== Career ==
Rivas started her career as legal advisor in various public entities, such as ENAPU, OSITRAN, and COPRI, as well as advisor to the office of the Prime Minister of Peru, and the Ministry of Foreign Relations (2000-2001).

In the private sector, she has been a consultant in various areas, in particular related to business competitiveness, good corporate governance, corporate social responsibility and others. In the field of university teaching, she has been a professor of administrative law at the Pontificia Universidad Católica del Perú. From March 2004 to October 2009, she was advisor to the general management and the presidency of the Peruvian Institute of Business Action (IPAE).

=== Presidency of Ollanta Humala ===
In the Ollanta Humala's administration, Rivas was appointed Chief of the Cabinet of Advisers to the Ministry of Justice. She was subsequently appointed Deputy Minister of Justice in December 2011.

On July 23, 2012, she was sworn as Minister of Justice and Human Rights, forming part of the third cabinet of president Ollanta Humala, led by Juan Jiménez Mayor.

Less than year after her appointment as Justice Minister, Rivas was rotated in the cabinet as Minister of Foreign Relations, becoming the first woman to be appointed Foreign Minister in Peruvian history.

On October 2, 2013, Rivas accompanied President Humala on an official tour to Asia. The Peruvian delegation was in Bangkok, Thailand, where the negotiations for a Foreign Trade Agreement were concluded. Subsequently, they headed to Bali, Indonesia, to attend the APEC summit, in which Humala participated alongside other heads of state. Unexpectedly, on October 7 it was announced that the Peruvian president would anticipate his return and that he would take advantage of a stopover in Paris to meet with French President François Hollande, a meeting agreed upon at the latter's request. Immediately, several Peruvian parliamentarians warned that the Congress of the Republic had given permission only for an international tour of Asia, but not France, for which a “constitutional violation” would have been committed.

On October 11, 2013, Rivas appeared before Congress to explain this situation; she justified the arrival of President Humala in Paris, arguing that it was only a "technical stopover", but not a trip; she also maintained that the meeting with the French president was “informal,” thus justifying the fact that Congress had not been asked for permission, without taking into account that State issues were discussed at the bilateral meeting. On October 14, 2013, a group of parliamentarians raised a censure motion against the Minister of Foreign Affairs. On October 20, after four hours of intense deliberation, the Congress went to the vote, which was favorable: 54 votes against censorship, 52 in favor and 4 abstentions.

An important event that occurred during her term at the Foreign Ministry was the International Court of Justice verdict on the controversy of maritime delimitation between Chile and Peru, on January 27, 2014, by which Peru recovered 50 thousand km² of sea.

On June 23, 2014, she was replaced by Gonzalo Gutiérrez Reinel, a career diplomat. This decision took her by surprise, since she expected her change for July of that year.

On April 16, 2015, she was appointed Peruvian Ambassador to Italy, a position she assumed in May of the same year. In addition, she was designated as the Permanent Representative of Peru to the Food and Agriculture Organization of the United Nations (FAO); before the World Food Program (WFP); and before the International Fund for Agricultural Development (IFAD). She was additionally named ambassador to San Marino and Cyprus. She was replaced in all diplomatic posts at the start of the presidency of Pedro Pablo Kuczynski.
