= Wilver Calle Girón =

Peruvian army general

Minister of Interior
- In office 15 May 2012 – 24 July 2012
- President: Ollanta Humala
- Prime Minister: Oscar Valdés
- Preceded by: Daniel Lozada
- Succeeded by: Wilfredo Pedraza

Personal details
- Born: 1 March 1946 (age 80) Lima, Peru

Military service
- Rank: General

Wilver Alfredo Calle Girón (born 1 March 1946) is a retired Peruvian army general, who briefly served as minister of interior from May to July 2012, in the Ollanta Humala administration.

== Career ==
Calle is a former Peruvian army official and general. He served as deputy defense minister until May 2012. He was appointed interior minister on 15 May 2012 to the cabinet led by then prime minister Oscar Valdés. Calle replaced Daniel Lozada in the post when the latter resigned from office on 10 May due to public protests over his failed struggle against Shining Path rebels. Calle was forced to resign from office in July due to deadly crashes in the Conga mine in the Cajamarca region that resulted in the killing of five people. He was removed from office on 24 July 2012 and Wilfredo Pedraza succeeded him as interior minister.
