= Octavio Salazar Miranda =

Peruvian politician (1952–2024)

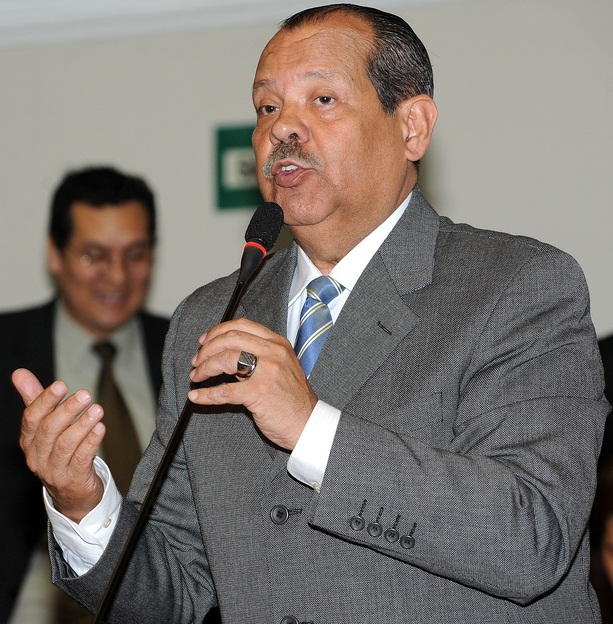
- Salazar in 2012

Minister of the Interior
- In office 11 July 2009 – 12 September 2010
- President: Alan García
- Prime Minister: Javier Velásquez
- Preceded by: Mercedes Cabanillas
- Succeeded by: Fernando Barrios Ipenza

Member of the Congress of the Republic of Peru for La Libertad
- In office 11 July 2011 – 30 September 2019

Personal details
- Born: 20 October 1952 Zaña, Peru
- Died: 24 December 2024 (aged 72)
- Party: FP

Octavio Salazar Miranda (20 October 1952 – 24 December 2024) was a Peruvian politician. A member of the Popular Force, he served as minister of the interior of Peru from 2009 to 2010 and in the Congress of the Republic of Peru from 2011 to 2019.

Salazar died on 24 December 2024, at the age of 72.
