= Marcial Ayaipoma =

Peruvian politician

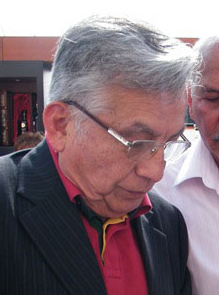

President of the Congress
- In office 26 July 2005 – 26 July 2006
- Preceded by: Antero Flores Aráoz
- Succeeded by: Mercedes Cabanillas

Member of Congress
- In office 26 July 2001 – 26 July 2006
- Constituency: Lima
- In office 26 July 2000 – 26 July 2001
- Constituency: National

Personal details
- Born: Marcial Ayaipoma Alvarado; 8 February 1942 (age 83); Lima, Peru
- Political party: Possible Peru

Marcial Ayaipoma Alvarado (born 8 February 1942) is a Peruvian doctor, surgerian and politician. As a member of Possible Peru, he was elected in 2000 as a Congressman and re-elected 2001. From 26 July 2005 to 26 July 2006 he was the President of the Congress of Peru. He announced that he was no longer participating in politics.

Dr. Ayaipoma is well known in Peru as a prominent fan of tauromachy or bullfighting. He is a cattle man that breeds fighting bulls (Toros de lidia, in Spanish) for the ring. It is reported that he still has some livestock, called "La Huaca" in the Dos de Mayo province highlands, where he also is involved in operating a hostel named in honor to his mother, Abilia Alvarado.
