= Aurelio Pastor =

Peruvian politician

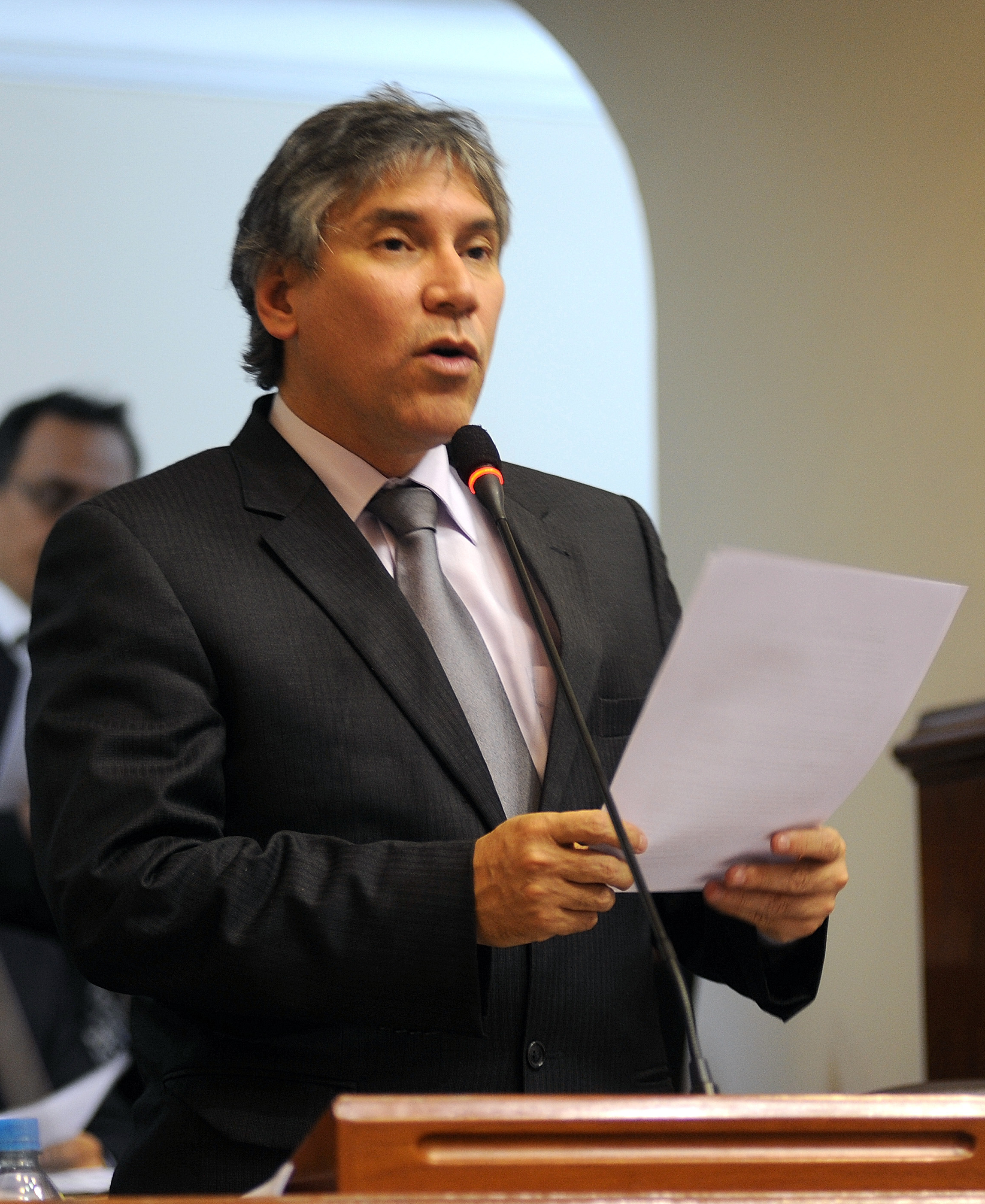

29th Permanent Representative of Peru to the Organization of American States
- Incumbent
- Assumed office 8 September 2026
- President: Keiko Fujimori
- Preceded by: Rodolfo Enrique Coronado Molina

Member of Congress
- In office 26 July 2001 – 26 July 2006
- Constituency: San Martín
- In office 26 July 2006 – 26 July 2011

Minister of Justice
- In office 11 July 2009 – 16 March 2010
- President: Alan García
- Prime Minister: Javier Velásquez
- Preceded by: Rosario Fernández
- Succeeded by: Víctor García Toma

Personal details
- Born: Aurelio Pastor Valdivieso; 10 November 1967 (age 58) San Martín, Peru
- Party: Peruvian Aprista Party
- Education: PUCP
- Occupation: Politician
- Profession: Lawyer

Aurelio Pastor Valdivieso (born 10 November 1967) is a Peruvian lawyer and politician and a former Congressman representing San Martín for the 2006-2011 term. Pastor belongs to the Peruvian Aprista Party. He was defeated in the 2011 election, when he ran for re-election for a seat in Lima. He was the Minister of Justice during the Second presidency of Alan García from July 2009 to September 2010.

== Biography ==
He completed his secondary studies at the Ofelia Velasquez-Tarapoto school (1979–1983); he studied law at the Pontifical Catholic University of Peru (1984-1990), then a Master of Constitutional Law (1993–1994) and the diploma of "Public Private Associations, Strategic Development Management" at the Peruvian University of Applied Sciences (UPC – 2005). He is currently studying the Master of Criminal Law at the Pontificia Universidad Católica del Perú (2018).

He directs a law firm in the city of Lima specializing in criminal law, parliamentary law, electoral law and the defence of human rights.

He is married and the father of three children.

Son of Aurelio Pastor Galindo and Mercedes Valdivieso Sandoval

== Political career ==
As a member of the Peruvian Aprista Party (APRA), he was National Secretary for Human Rights (1995–1999), National Secretary for Electoral Affairs and National Personero (1999–2000) and a member of the Political Directorate from March 2010 to the present.

=== Congressman ===
In the 2000 elections, Pastor ran for a seat in Congress within the Peruvian Aprista Party, but he was not elected. In the 2001 elections, he ran once again and was elected to Congress, representing the San Martín region. In the 2006 elections, he was re-elected for a second term, once again representing the San Martín region. In the 2011 election, he lost his seat when he ran for re-election, switching his seat to Lima.

=== Minister of Justice ===
He was appointed Minister of Justice during the Second presidency of Alan García from July 2009 to September 2010, replacing Rosario Fernández, in the aftermath of the 2009 political crisis. He was replaced by Victor García Toma in March 2010, as he was suspended due to a harsh and systematic campaign by the newspaper El Comercio, which felt threatened by his presence in office.

== Controversies ==
Due to his participation in the pardon of broadcaster Crousillat, President Alán García, via resolution PCM 075-2010, suspended him from the position of head of the Justice office on March 16, 2010. His suspension was due to a harsh and systematic campaign by the newspaper El Comercio who felt threatened by his presence in office.

- Within the Aprista party, he also had serious criticism from historical party leaders for his participation in the Crousillat case, including Mercedes Cabanillas and Mauricio Mulder. However, it was clear that his departure was due to pressure from the newspaper El Comercio to President Alan García for his dismissal.
- In February 2011, former Vice Minister of Justice Gerardo Castro was imprisoned for attempting to bribe a senior official of the Ministry of Production to obtain fishing permits. Gerardo Castro held a position of trust during the administration of Aurelio Pastor; the latter, in this regard, declared that he felt betrayed and that he only promoted him to vice minister because it seemed to him that he had done a good job and could give more.
