= Víctor García Toma =

Peruvian politician (born 1954)

Victor García Toma
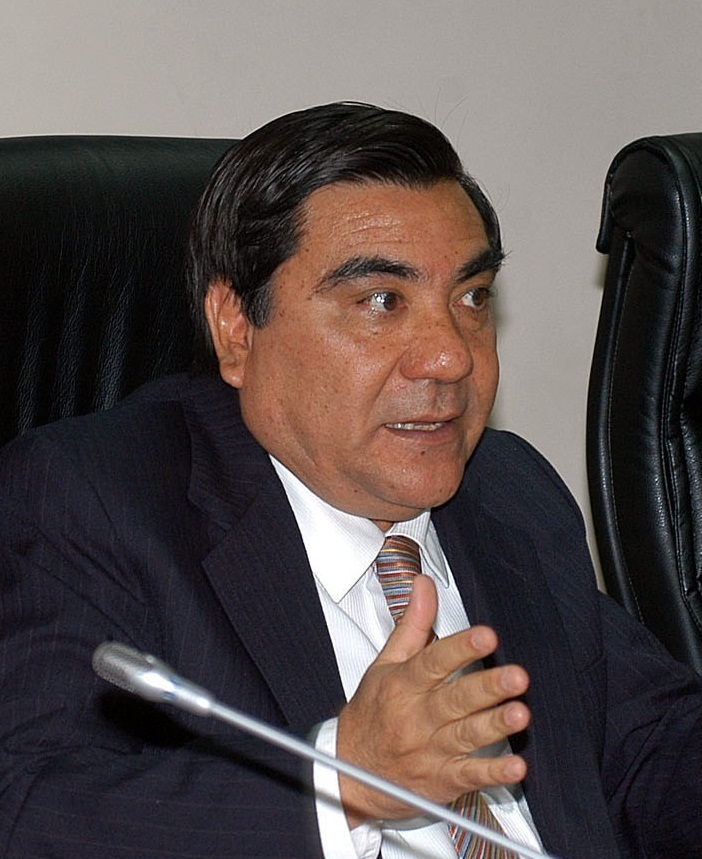
- Víctor García Toma

Minister of Justice
- In office 16 March 2010 – 14 September 2010
- President: Alan García
- Preceded by: Aurelio Pastor
- Succeeded by: Rosario Fernández

Personal details
- Born: 2 June 1954 (age 71) Lima, Peru
- Party: Independent

Víctor Óscar Shiyin García Toma (born 2 June 1954) is a former Peruvian justice minister during the Second Presidency of Alan García.

== Biography ==
Victor Garcia studied at the Faculty of Law of the University of San Martin de Porres. Member of Peruvian Aprista Party (APRA). He is a professor at the Faculty of Law of the University of Lima, in the Masters in Governance of the Private University San Martin de Porres and Post Graduate Unit of the National University of San Marcos. Previously he taught at the Faculty of Law and Political Science Private University San Martin de Porres, Federico Villarreal National University and Private University Inca Garcilaso de la Vega, as well as the Diplomatic Academy of Peru, at the College Public Administration (ESAP) and the Higher School of Police (ESUPOL).

During his career he has held the following positions: Advisor to the Attorney General of the Nation (1986-1989); Project Supervisor of the Inter-American Agency for Development (AID) and the Public Prosecutor for the Improvement of the Administration of Justice (1987); Cabinet Chief of Staff of the Ministry of the Presidency with the rank of Deputy Minister (1987); Chief of the Presidential Commission for the visit of Pope John Paul II (1988); Secretary of the Advisory Board of Prosecutors (1989); Secretary General of the Presidency of the Council of Ministers with the rank of Deputy Minister (1989); Member of the Board of the Bank of Commerce (1989-1990); member of the Board of the Bar Association of Lima (periods 1991, 1992 and 1995); Judge of the Constitutional Court (2002-2007); President of the Constitutional Court (December 2005-December 2006); Director of the Institute of Social Market Economy at the University of Lima (2007-2009); Dean of the Faculty of Law of the University of Lima (2008-2010); Ad Hoc Judge of the Inter-American Court of Human Rights (June 2008 to November 2009. Case: Acevedo Buendía et al.; Anzualdo Kenneth Castro); and Minister of State in the portfolio of Justice (2010).
