= Daniel Lozada =

Peruvian economist

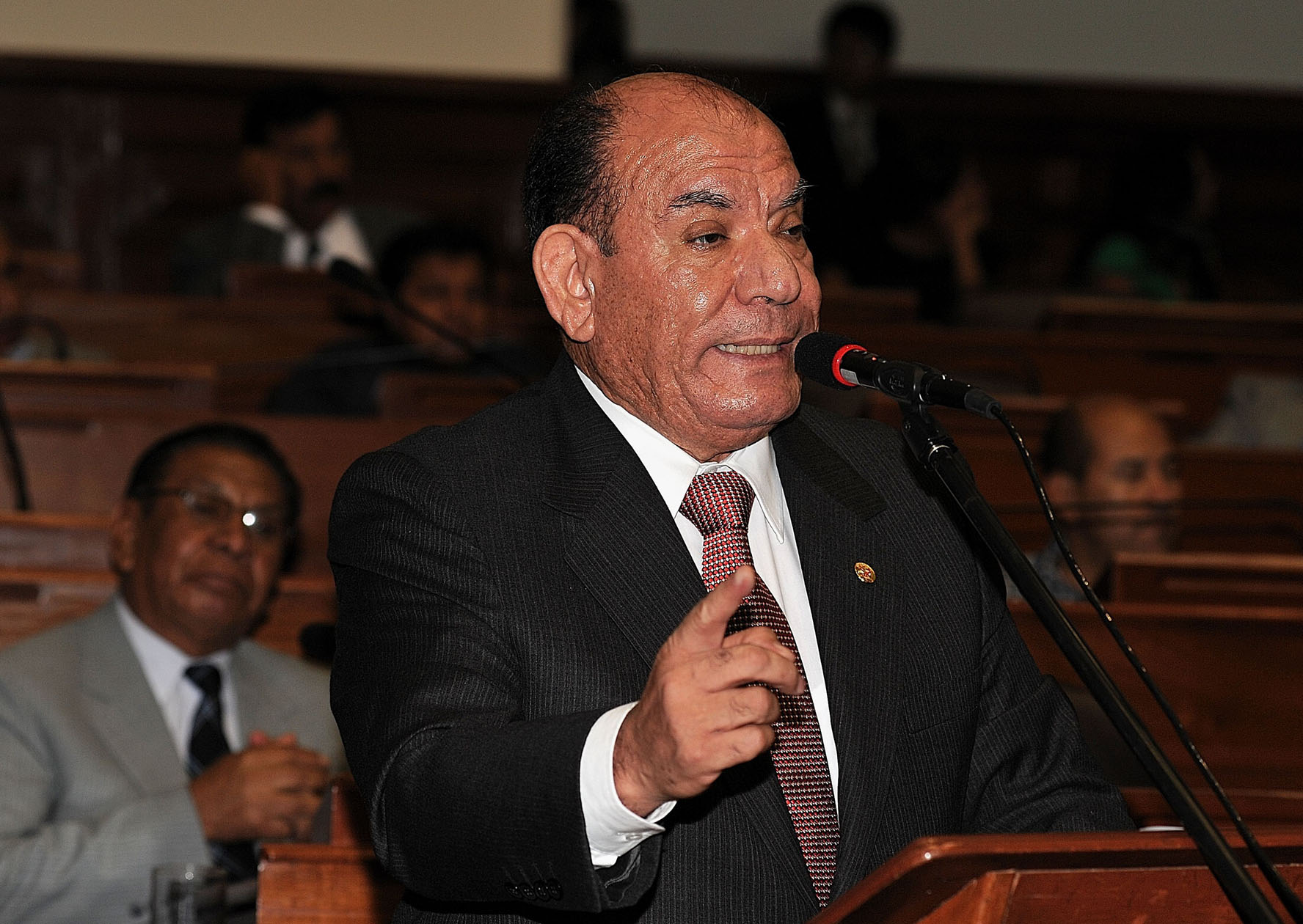

Minister of Interior
- In office 11 December 2011 – 15 May 2012
- President: Ollanta Humala
- Prime Minister: Oscar Valdés
- Preceded by: Oscar Valdés
- Succeeded by: William Calle

Daniel Lozada is a Peruvian economist, who served as interior minister from December 2011 to May 2012. He is a member of the Lozada family, the Arequipa branch.

== Career ==
Lozada is a businessman and an economist by profession. He was the general manager of Contilatin del Perú SA and Avícolas Asociadas SA. He also served as chief of staff at the ministry of interior, where he developed projects such as the Voluntary Police Service and the Law for the Incorporation of Rural Patrols into Rural Patrols. He had a direct participation in the development of the policy of said ministry, leading a multidisciplinary team of advisers. He completed his primary education at the Colegio San José in his hometown, and secondary at the Colegio Militar Francisco Bolognesi. He graduated as an economist from the La Molina National Agrarian University, in Lima.

He was appointed interior minister on 11 December 2011 in a reshuffle to the cabinet led by then prime minister Oscar Valdés. Lozada succeeded Valdés as interior minister. On 3 May 2012, the motion of censure against Lozada and Otárola was presented in plenary session for "incapacity, lack of leadership and strategy". Lozada and defense minister Alberto Otárola irrevocably resigned from office on 10 May. William Calle replaced Lozada in the post.
