= Juan Jiménez Mayor =

Former Prime Minister of Peru

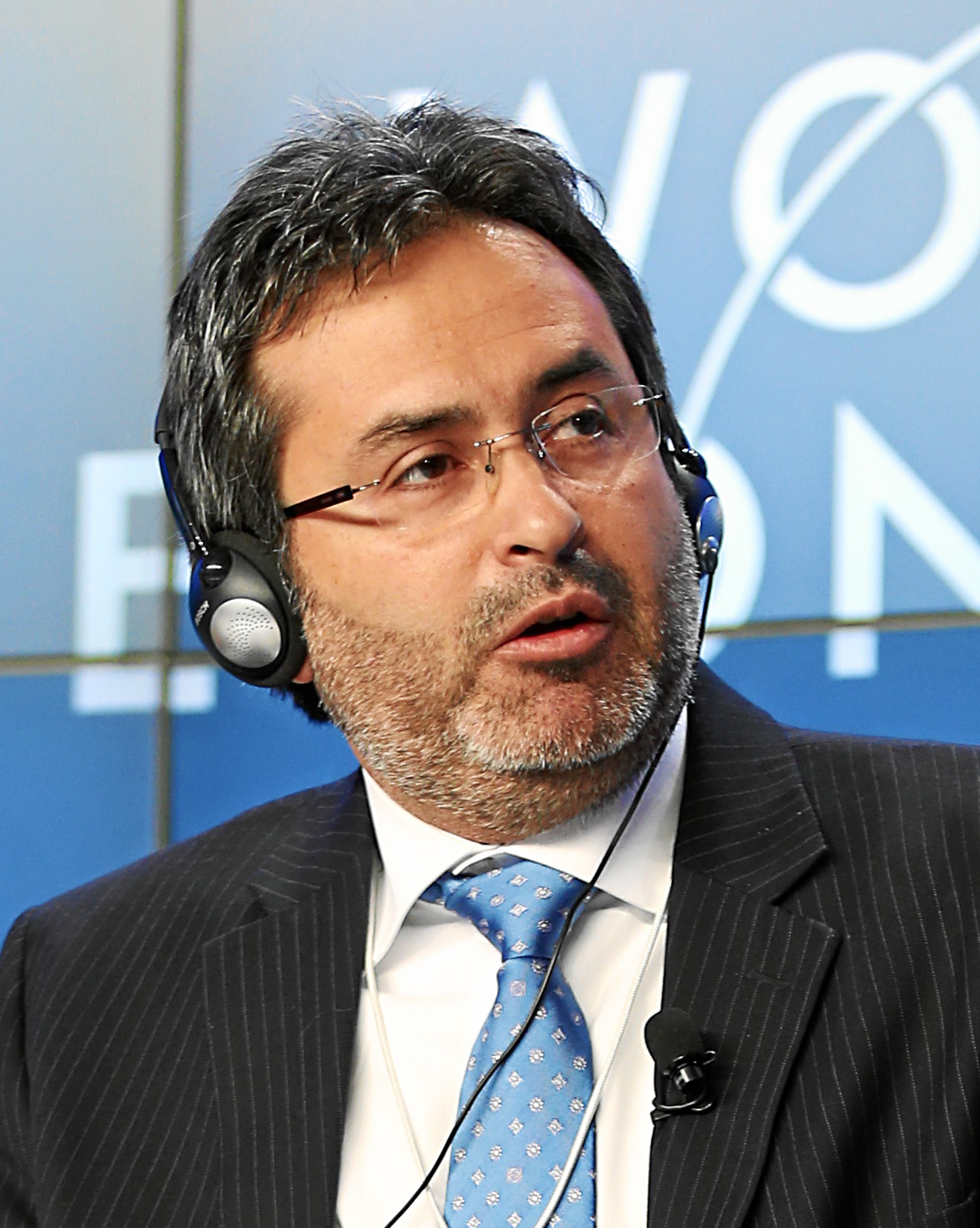
- Jiménez during the WEF 2013

Prime Minister of Peru
- In office 23 July 2012 – 31 October 2013
- President: Ollanta Humala
- Preceded by: Oscar Valdés
- Succeeded by: César Villanueva

Minister of Justice and Human Rights
- In office 11 December 2011 – 23 July 2012
- President: Ollanta Humala
- Prime Minister: Óscar Valdés
- Preceded by: Francisco Eguiguren
- Succeeded by: Eda Rivas

Deputy Minister of Justice
- In office 7 August 2011 – 11 December 2011
- President: Ollanta Humala
- Prime Minister: Salomon Lerner Ghitis
- Minister: Francisco Eguiguren
- Preceded by: Magly Amparo García Bocanegra
- Succeeded by: Eda Rivas
- In office 25 November 2000 – 28 July 2001
- President: Valentín Paniagua
- Prime Minister: Javier Pérez de Cuéllar
- Minister: Diego García Sayán
- Preceded by: Ana Reátegui Napurí
- Succeeded by: Pedro Cateriano

Personal details
- Born: 5 August 1964 (age 62) Lima, Peru
- Party: Independent
- Education: Pontifical Catholic University of Peru

Juan Federico Jiménez Mayor (born 5 August 1964) is a Peruvian politician who was Prime Minister of Peru from July 2012 to October 2013. He previously served as Minister of Justice and Human Rights, and was appointed to the post of Prime Minister on 23 July 2012 by President Ollanta Humala. He resigned his post on 29 October 2013, and was replaced by César Villanueva, Governor of the San Martín Region.

== Education ==
Jiménez studied law at the Pontifical Catholic University of Peru. He also holds a master's degree in constitutional law.

== Career ==
After graduation, he qualified for the bar. He is a human rights lawyer. He served as faculty member at his alma meter, Catholic University. In 2000, he was appointed Deputy Minister of Justice to interim government led by Valentín Paniagua. In August 2011, he was reappointed deputy justice minister. In December 2011, he became Minister of Justice and Human Rights. In his short stay at the ministry he dealt with several high-profile problems. From 2013 to 2016 he served as Permanent Representative of Peru to the Organization of American States.

Political offices
Preceded by Francisco Eguiguren	Minister of Justice; 2011–2012	Succeeded by Eda Rivas
Preceded by Oscar Valdés	Prime Minister of Peru; 2012–2013	Succeeded by César Villanueva
