= Rosario Fernández =

Peruvian politician (born 1955)

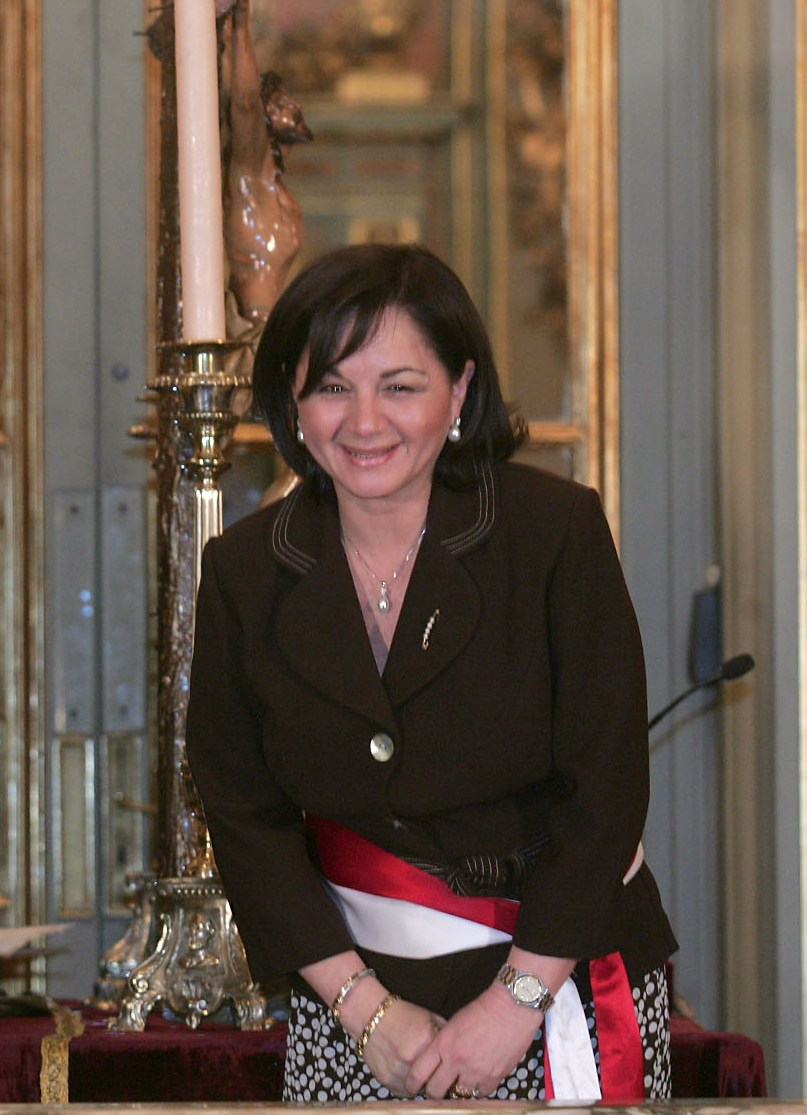

Prime Minister of Peru
- In office 19 March 2011 – 28 July 2011
- President: Alan García
- Preceded by: José Antonio Chang
- Succeeded by: Salomón Lerner Ghitis

Minister of Justice
- In office 14 September 2010 – 28 July 2011
- Prime Minister: José Antonio Chang; Herself
- Preceded by: Víctor García Toma
- Succeeded by: Francisco Eguiguren
- In office 20 December 2007 – 11 July 2009
- Prime Minister: Jorge Del Castillo; Yehude Simon
- Preceded by: María Zavala Valladares
- Succeeded by: Aurelio Pastor

Personal details
- Born: 1955 (age 70–71) Lima, Peru
- Party: Independent
- Spouse: Ernesto Coz
- Children: 2
- Education: Pontifical Catholic University of Peru (LLB)

Rosario del Pilar Fernández Figueroa (born 1955) is a Peruvian politician. She is a former Prime Minister of Peru and Minister of Justice.

== Biography ==
Fernández was born in Lima, Peru. She is the daughter of Joffré Fernández Valdivieso, a constitutional lawyer and former Deputy and Minister of Justice from 1985 to 1990.

She studied law at Pontifical Catholic University of Peru, ranking first in the 1977 graduating class. She continued advanced studies in Washington, D.C., gaining experience in civil procedure, arbitration, civil law, family law and international law.

Fernández was the vice chairman of the Lima Stock Exchange from 1988 to 1991 and Treasurer of the Board of the Lima Bar Association from 1993 to 1994. During this time, she was also appointed to various committee positions in the Peruvian government, including attorney ad hoc of the Supervisory Agency for Investment in Energy, alternate member of the committee to Protect Minority Shareholders of National Supervisory Commission for Companies and Securities (CONASEV).

In 2007, Fernández was named Minister of Justice, a position that she resigned from in 2009. The following year, she returned to the political scene to replace Víctor García Toma after the turbulence caused by the Legislative Decree No. 1097.

In March 2011, Fernández became Chief of the Cabinet of Ministers. Her term as Prime Minister ended in July of that same year.

She is married to lawyer Ernest Coz and is the mother of two daughters.

Political offices
Preceded by María Zavala Valladares	Minister of Justice; 2008–2009	Succeeded by Aurelio Pastor
Preceded by Víctor García Toma	Minister of Justice; 2010–2011	Succeeded by Francisco Eguiguren Praeli
Preceded by José Antonio Chang	Prime Minister of Peru; 2011	Succeeded by Salomón Lerner Ghitis
