= Mercedes Cabanillas =

Peruvian educator and politician

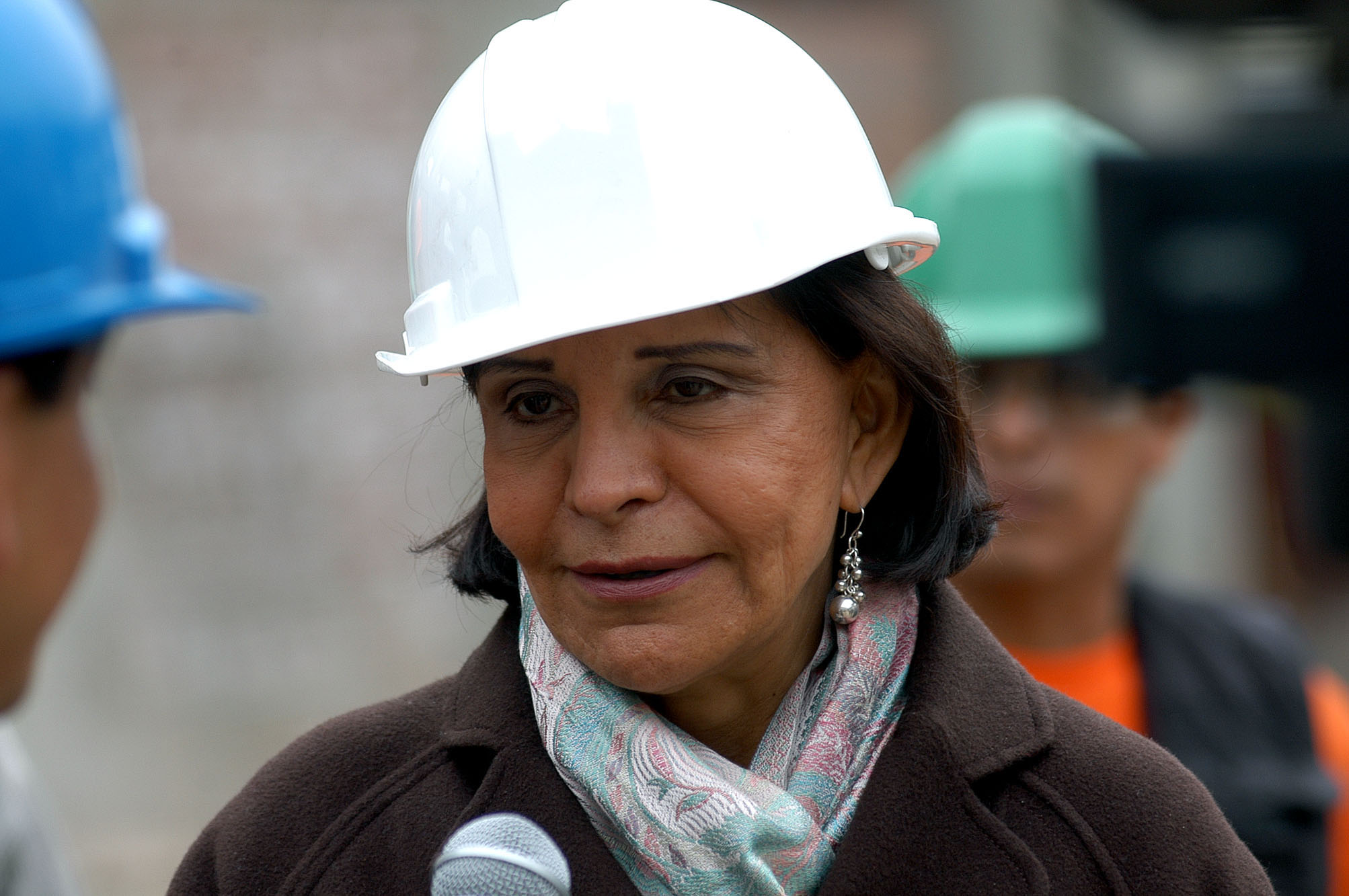

Chairman of the Peruvian Aprista Party National Political Commission
- In office 7 June 2004 – 5 March 2010
- President: Alan García
- Preceded by: Office created
- Succeeded by: Javier Velásquez

Minister of the Interior
- In office 19 February 2009 – 11 July 2009
- President: Alan García
- Prime Minister: Yehude Simon
- Preceded by: Remigio Hernani Meloni
- Succeeded by: Octavio Salazar Miranda

President of Congress
- In office 26 July 2006 – 26 July 2007
- Preceded by: Marcial Ayaipoma
- Succeeded by: Luis Gonzales Posada

Member of Congress
- In office 26 July 2000 – 25 July 2011
- Constituency: Lima (2001-2011); National (2000-2001)

Senator of the Republic
- In office 26 July 1990 – 5 April 1992
- Constituency: National

Minister of Education
- In office 5 May 1990 – 28 July 1990
- President: Alan García
- Prime Minister: Guillermo Larco Cox
- Preceded by: Efraín Orbegozo Rodríguez
- Succeeded by: Gloria Helfer Palacios
- In office 26 June 1987 – 9 August 1988
- President: Alan García
- Prime Minister: Guillermo Larco Cox; Armando Villanueva
- Preceded by: Grover Pango Vildoso
- Succeeded by: Efraín Orbegozo Rodríguez

Member of the Chamber of Deputies
- In office July 26, 1985 – July 26, 1990
- Constituency: Lima

Personal details
- Born: 22 May 1947 (age 79) Callao, Peru
- Party: Peruvian Aprista Party
- Spouse: Luis Llanos de la Matta
- Education: Federico Villarreal National University (BA); Inca Garcilaso de la Vega University (MA, PhD)

Mercedes Cabanillas Bustamante (born May 22, 1947) is a Peruvian educator and politician. A prominent member of the Peruvian Aprista Party, she served as Minister of Education in the first presidency of Alan García, making her the first woman to assume a cabinet position in the history of Peru. Most recently, she briefly served as Minister of Interior in Alan García's second presidency, a position subject to scrutiny as she was signaled as responsible of the repression of natives in the 2009 Amazon crisis, in Bagua, which forced her to resign, and effectively ended her political career.

Throughout most of her political career, Cabanillas served as a congresswoman in a variety of non-consecutive terms between 1985 and 2011. In the 1995 elections, she became the first woman to be selected as a major party presidential nominee with the Peruvian Aprista Party, placing third in the general election. She would go on to be elected as the third woman (after Martha Chávez and Martha Hildebrandt) to be President of Congress in 2006.

Cabanillas retired from politics after she was defeated in her congressional reelection bid in the 2011 general election.

== Early life and education ==
Her parents were Armando Cabanillas Olaechea and Emma Bustamante, both members of the Peruvian Aprista Party. She entered the Party in 1961, exercising various offices such as member of the National Command of the Youth Wing Juventud Aprista Peruana, National Secretary of Women Affairs, and in 1982, the Women Political Action Committee.

She majored in Education and Human Science at the Federico Villarreal National University, earning a bachelor's degree. She would pursue an M.A. and Ph.D. in Education Administration from the Inca Garcilaso de la Vega University.

== Career ==
=== First presidency of Alan García (1985-1990) ===
She was elected to Congress as a Member of the Chamber of Deputies for the term 1985–1990. She entered the Government when President Alan García appointed her Minister of Education in 1987, after the resignation of the Cabinet led by Prime Minister Luis Alva Castro. At the helm, she promised to attend the demands of the teachers syndicate, SUTEP. She began with a raise of 35% for the public teachers. She visited schools in Lima and Provinces.

Surprisingly, in 1988, the Electoral Committee of the Party elected her as Candidate for Mayor of Lima. She resigned from office in August 1988 to run for the 1989 Lima mayorship elections, placing fourth.

=== Senate and presidential nominee ===
After placing fourth in the mayorship race, she ran for a seat in the Senate, gaining the highest number of votes (328,714), thus elected Senator for the term 1990–1995. Her term as Senator was cut short when President Alberto Fujimori dissolved Congress with his self-coup in 1992.

In 1995 Cabanillas ran for the presidency as the Peruvian Aprista Party nominee, attaining only 4.11% of the popular vote. Her running mates were former senator Jorge Lozada Stanbury and Alejandro Santa María Silva.

=== Return to Congress (2000) and second presidency of Alan García (2006-2011) ===
In 2000, she was elected to Congress under the Peruvian Aprista Party. She was reelected in 2001 and 2006. When Alan García was elected president for the term 2006–2011, Congress elected her President of the Congress for the annual term of 2006–2007.

On February 19, 2009, President Alan García appointed her Minister of the Interior. As such she was in charge of the Police forces that were sent to the amazon region of Bagua to repress Natives who were protesting against the government that was giving away their ancestral lands to foreign corporations for oil drilling, mining and logging. As a result of the violent intervention of the heavily armed police and military forces over 50 Natives were killed and nearly 200 wounded. As Minister of the Interior she gave the order to attack the Natives. She resigned alongside the Prime Minister Yehude Simon on July 11.

She served in Congress until her term expired in 2011, as she failed to win a fourth consecutive election, receiving a minority of votes, prompting her to retire from politics. She remains a very influential leader in the Peruvian Aprista Party, serving as chair of the party's Electoral Tribunal since 2017. She was reelected to the same position in 2019.

== See also ==
- First Presidency of Alan García
- Second Presidency of Alan García
- American Popular Revolutionary Alliance

Political offices
Preceded by Remigio Hernani	Minister of Interior of Peru (2009)	Succeeded by Octavio Salazar Miranda
Preceded by Marcial Ayaipoma	President of Congress of Peru (Jul 2006 – Jul 2007)	Succeeded by Luis Gonzales Posada
Preceded by Grover Pango	Minister of Education of Peru (1987–1988)	Succeeded by Efraín Orbegozo

Preceded by Luis Alva Castro	Partido Aprista Presidential Candidate; 1995 – (Lost)	Succeeded by Abel Salinas
