= Vicente Romero Fernández =

Peruvian government official

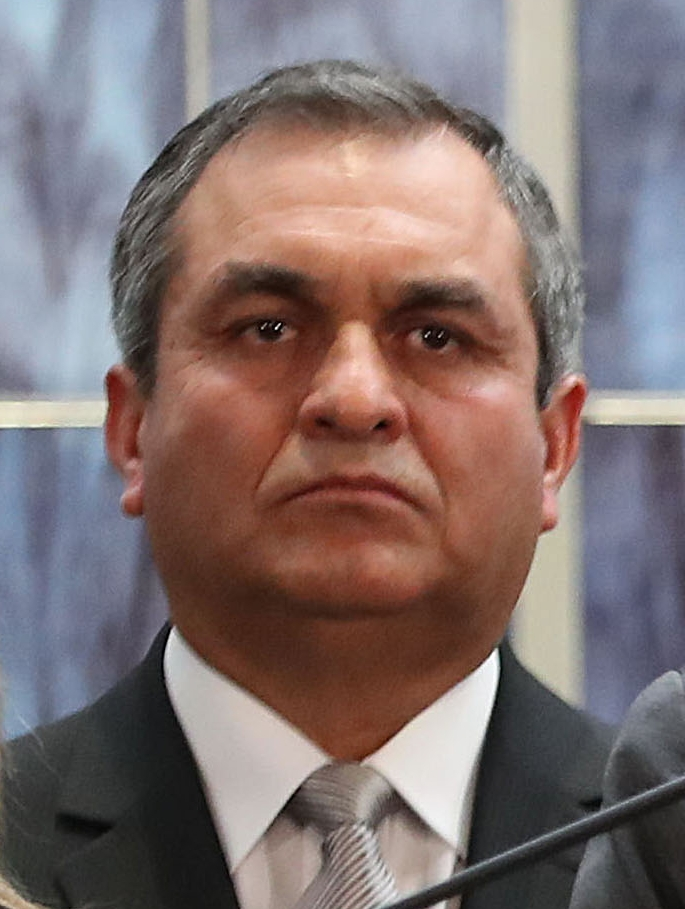

Minister of the Interior
- In office 13 January 2023 – 17 November 2023
- President: Dina Boluarte
- Prime Minister: Alberto Otárola
- Preceded by: Víctor Rojas Herrera
- Succeeded by: Víctor Torres Falcón
- In office 27 December 2017 – 2 April 2018
- President: Pedro Pablo Kuczynski
- Prime Minister: Mercedes Aráoz
- Preceded by: Carlos Basombrío Iglesias
- Succeeded by: Mauro Medina Guimaraes

General Director of the Peruvian National Police
- In office 27 August 2015 – 11 September 2017
- Preceded by: Jorge Flores Goicochea
- Succeeded by: Richard Zubiate Talledo

Personal details
- Born: December 7, 1955 (age 70) Cajamarca, Peru

Vicente Romero Fernández (born in Cajamarca on 7 December 1955) is a retired general of the Peruvian National Police. He is the current Minister of the Interior of Peru since 13 January 2023 under the presidency of Dina Boluarte. He previously served as the Minister of the Interior under the presidency of Pedro Pablo Kuczynski from 9 January to 2 April 2018, after the resignation of Carlos Basombrío.

== Career ==
Romero specializes in internal order, public management and investment projects. In addition, he is an Intelligence analyst and has a degree in Administration. He trained in specialized courses in the Peruvian Armed Forces and abroad, such as counterterrorism at the Louisiana Police Academy, at the Grenadiers School of Colombia and a security course in Taiwan.

He was head of the Anti-Drug Executive Directorate (Dirandro) and Chief of Staff of the National Police.

He was director of the Peruvian National Police from 27 August 2015 to 11 September 2017.

=== Minister of Interior ===
==== Kuczynski government ====
On December 27, 2017, Romero was sworn in as Minister of the Interior before President Pedro Pablo Kuczynski, replacing the resigning Carlos Basombrío Iglesias and at the proposal of Prime Minister Mercedes Araoz.

Romero served through the end of Kuczynski's presidency, formally resigning on 2 April 2018. President Martín Vizcarra appointed former police general Mauro Medina as Romero's successor at the ministry.

==== Boluarte government ====
Romero was made Minister of Interior again in 2023 under the government of Dina Boluarte. Following the Peruvian National Police raid of the National University of San Marcos during the 2022–2023 Peruvian political protests, which resulted in 200 arrests, the Attorney General of Peru began preliminary investigations "for the alleged crime of omission of functional acts due to the police intervention"
