= Gino Costa =

Peruvian politician (born 1956)

Gino Costa Santolalla
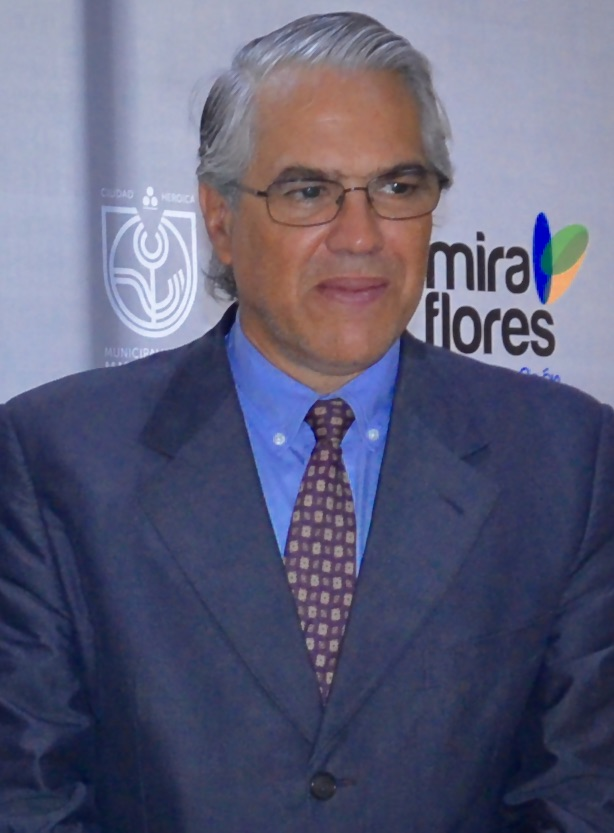

Member of Congress
- In office 26 July 2016 – 26 July 2021
- Constituency: Lima

Minister of the Interior
- In office 21 July 2002 – 27 January 2003
- President: Alejandro Toledo
- Prime Minister: Luis Solari
- Deputy: Carlos Basombrío Iglesias
- Preceded by: Fernando Rospigliosi
- Succeeded by: Alberto Sanabria Ortiz

Deputy Minister of the Interior
- In office 2 August 2001 – 21 July 2002
- President: Alejandro Toledo
- Prime Minister: Roberto Dañino
- Minister: Fernando Rospigliosi
- Preceded by: Martín Solari de la Fuente
- Succeeded by: Carlos Basombrío Iglesias

Personal details
- Born: 27 January 1956 (age 70) Lima, Peru
- Party: Independent (Caucuses with the Purple Party) (2015–present)
- Other political affiliations: We Are Peru (2015); Party for Social Democracy - Commitment Peru (1997–2007)
- Education: Pontifical Catholic University of Peru (BA); University of East Anglia (MA); Queens' College, Cambridge (MPhil; PhD)

Gino Francisco Costa Santolalla (born 27 January 1956) is a Peruvian politician who is an Independent Congressman caucusing with the Purple Party, representing the constituency of Lima.

He previously served as Interior Minister in the Cabinet of Peru from 2002 to 2003 a United Nations official, president of the National Penitentiary Institute (INPE) and deputy defender for human rights and people with disabilities of the Ombudsman's Office.

== Education ==
He studied law at the Pontifical Catholic University of Peru, completed a master's degree in development studies at the University of East Anglia in 1983, and then completed his MPhil and PhD (1987) in international relations at Queens' College, Cambridge.

== Career ==
He worked at the United Nations, first at the Center for Human Rights in Geneva, Switzerland (1988–1989) and then at peacekeeping missions in Central America.

He was part of the Electoral Verification Mission in Nicaragua (ONUVEN, 1990), the International Support and Verification Commission in Honduras (CIAV / ONU, 1990) and the Observer Mission in El Salvador (ONUSAL, 1990–1994).

In El Salvador, he was an advisor to three successive Chiefs of Mission responsible for implementing the Peace Accords between the FMLN guerrillas and the Alfredo Cristiani government that ended a decade of civil war. He had a leading role in the creation of the new police force.

Back in Peru, he collaborated with Jorge Santistevan de Noriega in the establishment of the Ombudsman's Office in 1996, serving as Executive Secretary of the Ad-hoc Commission of Pardons for terrorism cases between 1996 and 1999 and as Deputy Defender for Human Rights and People with Disabilities between 1997 and 2000.

After the fall of the government of Alberto Fujimori and during the Transitional government of Valentín Paniagua (2001), he was president of the National Penitentiary Institute (INPE).

Costa then worked at the United Nations and served as Deputy Interior Minister from 2001 to 2002 before being promoted to head the Ministry.

After the fall of the government of Alberto Fujimori and during the Transitional government of Valentín Paniagua in 2001, he was president of the National Penitentiary Institute (INPE).

=== Political career ===
On 12 July 2002, he was appointed Minister of the Interior by President Alejandro Toledo. As minister, he played a leading role in the police reform effort in the country and in the creation of the national citizen security system.

Since 26 July 2016, he has served as a member of the Congress of Peru. At the end of 2017, he resigned from the Peruvians for Change (PPK) bench due to discrepancies in how the humanitarian pardon was granted to former President Alberto Fujimori.

In March 2020, he introduced an anti-police brutality bill to establish laws for the proportional use of force by authorities in Peru. He also criticized members of congress for ignoring the bill, stating "now that we have police and military in the streets looking after us, Parliament cannot give the signal that they can use their weapons as they please", referencing the enforced curfews in response to the COVID-19 pandemic in Peru.
