= María Zavala Valladares =

Peruvian politician, lawyer and judge

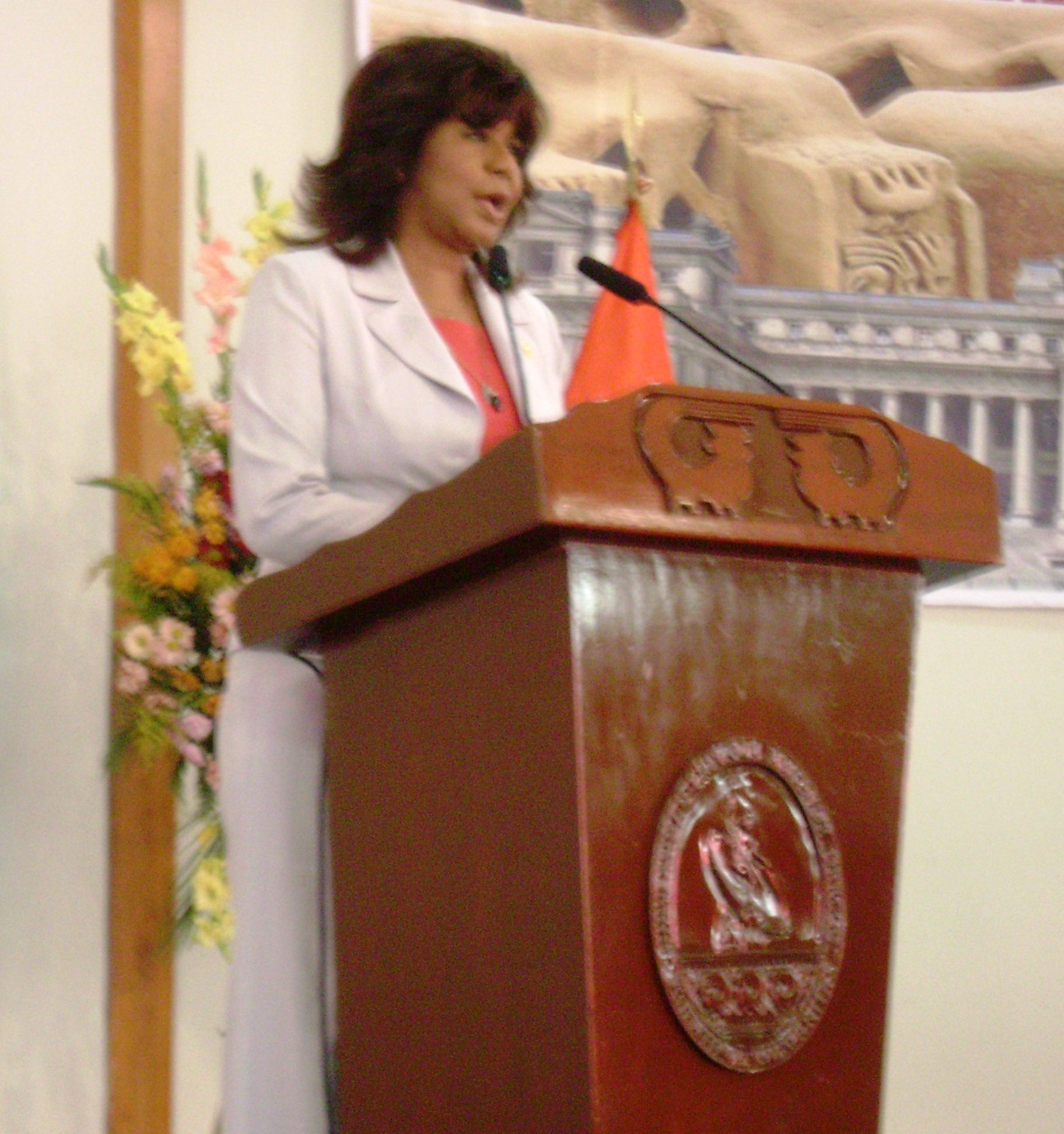

Member of the National Board of Justice
- Incumbent
- Assumed office 20 January 2020

Minister of Justice
- In office 28 July 2006 – 20 December 2007
- President: Alan García
- Prime Minister: Jorge Del Castillo
- Preceded by: Alejandro Tudela
- Succeeded by: Rosario Fernández Figueroa

Personal details
- Born: 15 January 1956 (age 70) Lima, Peru
- Party: Independent
- Education: Pontifical Catholic University of Peru
- Profession: Lawyer

María Zavala Valladares (born January 15, 1956) is a Peruvian politician, lawyer and judge. She was the Minister for Justice.

== Biography ==
Zavala Valladares was born in Talara on 15 January 1956. Zavala Valladares has been President of the Superior Courts of Lima and Loreto. She was appointed Minister of Justice of Peru in 2006 when she became a member of Alan García's first cabinet. The next Minister of Justice was Rosario Fernández who took over the role in 2008.

On January 3, 2008 Zavala Valladares became Peru's Permanent Representative to the Organization of American States (OAS), replacing Antero Florez Araoz. She served until 2010.

In 2010 Zavala was serving as part of a Truth Commission to investigate the fall of power of Manuel Zelaya in Honduras.

In 2024, Zavala was a member of the National Board of Justice's Partial Performance Evaluation Commission which was tasked with the task of looking at the country's judges to evaluate their core competencies and to advise what additional action might assist. Zavala intends that her advice should include aligning the justice system with the UN's Sustainable Development Goals.
