= Eduardo Vega Luna =

Peruvian lawyer, jurist and politician

Eduardo Ernesto Vega Luna (Lima, February 16, 1966) is a Peruvian lawyer, jurist and politician. He was minister of justice during the government of Francisco Sagasti, from November 18, 2020, to July 28, 2021. He was also ombudsman in the period 2011–2016.

== Biography ==
He is a lawyer who graduated from the National University of San Marcos and has a master's degree in peace and development at the UNESCO Chair of Philosophy for Peace, from the Jaume I University of Spain and also a master's degree in criminal law from the UNMSM.

In December 1996, he joined the Ombudsman's Office, during the administration of Jorge Santistevan de Noriega, as coordinator of the Technical Secretariat of the Ad Hoc Commission of Pardons for persons unjustly accused of terrorism. Later, he was commissioner of the office of the deputy for human rights and persons with disabilities. In 2006, he assumed the position of deputy ombudsman for human rights and persons with disabilities.

Ombudsman

On April 1, 2011, Eduardo Vega Luna assumed the position of head of the ombudsman's office, replacing Beatriz Merino.

During his administration, Vega was characterized by his position in favor of the LGTB Community, calling for the implementation of fundamental rights measures in favor of the group. He also collaborated with the bill that urged the search for missing persons during the period of violence 1980–2000.

Vega remained in office until August 29, 2016, when he was replaced in office by attorney Walter Gutiérrez.

Minister of Justice

On November 18, 2020, Eduardo Vega was appointed and sworn in by interim president Francisco Sagasti as Minister of Justice and Human Rights.

Universidad Antonio Ruiz de Montoya

Eduardo Vega is the Dean of Social Sciences and head of the Law Program at UARM.
