= Germán Arenas y Loayza =

Peruvian lawyer and politician

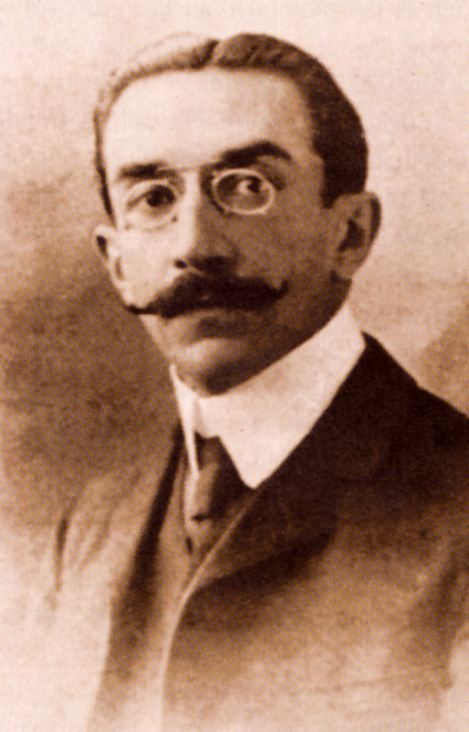

Germán Arenas y Zuñiga (May 1870 – 10 April 1948) was a Peruvian lawyer and politician. He was a member of the Civilista Party. He was born in Lima, Peru. He graduated from the National University of San Marcos. He served in the Chamber of Deputies of Peru. He was three times minister of the interior (1907–1908, 1917–1918, 1918–1919) and minister of finance (February–April 1918) in the Government of Peru. He was twice Prime Minister of Peru (December 1918 – April 1919, December 1931 – January 1932).

| Preceded by Agustín Tovar Aguilar | Minister of Interior of Peru; October 9, 1907 – September 24, 1908 | Succeeded by Miguel A. Rojas |
| Preceded by Ezequiel Muñoz | Minister of Interior of Peru; July 27, 1917 – February 26, 1918 | Succeeded by Samuel Sayán y Palacios |
| Preceded by Baldomero F. Maldonado | Minister of Economy and Finance of Peru; February–April 1918 | Succeeded by Víctor M. Maúrtua |
| Preceded by Francisco Tudela y Varela | Prime Minister of Peru; December 18, 1918 – April 26, 1919 | Succeeded by Juan Manuel Zuloaga |
| Preceded by Clemente J. Revilla | Minister of Interior of Peru; December 18, 1918 – April 26, 1919 | Succeeded by Óscar Mavila |
| Preceded by Antonio Beingolea | Prime Minister of Peru; December 8, 1931 – January 28, 1932 | Succeeded by Francisco R. Lanatta Ramírez |
