= Óscar Valdés =

Peruvian businessman and politician

Oscar Valdés
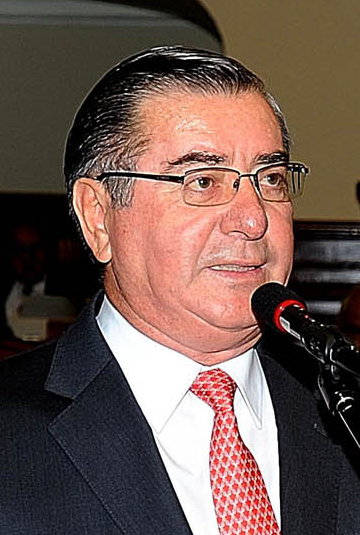

Prime Minister of Peru
- In office 11 December 2011 – 23 July 2012
- President: Ollanta Humala
- Preceded by: Salomón Lerner Ghitis
- Succeeded by: Juan Jiménez Mayor

Minister of Interior
- In office 28 July 2011 – 10 December 2011
- President: Ollanta Humala
- Prime Minister: Salomon Lerner
- Preceded by: Miguel Hidalgo Medina
- Succeeded by: Daniel Lozada

Personal details
- Born: 3 April 1949 (age 77) Lima, Peru
- Party: Christian People’s Party (since 2024)
- Other political affiliations: Independent (until 2024)
- Education: Chorrillos Military School; United States Army Command and General Staff College

Military service
- Allegiance: Peru
- Branch/service: Peruvian Army
- Years of service: 1972–1991
- Rank: Lieutenant colonel

Oscar Eduardo Valdés Dancuart (born 3 April 1949) is a Peruvian businessman and politician who was Prime Minister of Peru from 11 December 2011 until 23 July 2012. A former military officer, he was appointed Minister of the Interior by President Ollanta Humala on 28 July 2011. Less than five months later, Prime Minister Salomón Lerner Ghitis resigned and Valdés was appointed his successor on 11 December 2011. He was dismissed on 23 July 2012, after criticism on his handling of the Conga Mining project.

== Background ==
Born in Lima, Valdés studied at the Chorrillos Military School from 1968 to 1972, and he entered the service of the Peruvian Army as a second lieutenant of the artillery afterwards. From 1987 to 1988 he took course in command and staff at the United States Army Command and General Staff College, Fort Leavenworth. During the 1980s, he acted as an instructor at the Chorrillos military academy, where Ollanta Humala was his student. Valdés retired from army service in January 1991 when he was lieutenant colonel, because he was shunted from promotion by intelligence chief Vladimiro Montesinos. Following his resignation, Valdés engaged in the private sector, managing different businesses in his home region of Tacna.

Valdés took a tough stance towards the protesters against the controversial Conga mining project and social conflicts in general. Ex-president Alejandro Toledo, whose Possible Peru party supported the Humala administration so far, expressed concerns about the "militarization" of the government. The confrontational stance towards the conflict finally led to Valdés' dismissal on 23 July 2012.

Political offices
Preceded by Salomón Lerner Ghitis	Prime Minister of Peru; 2011–2012	Succeeded by Juan Jiménez Mayor
