= Manuel Velarde Seoane =

Peruvian politician (1833–1900)

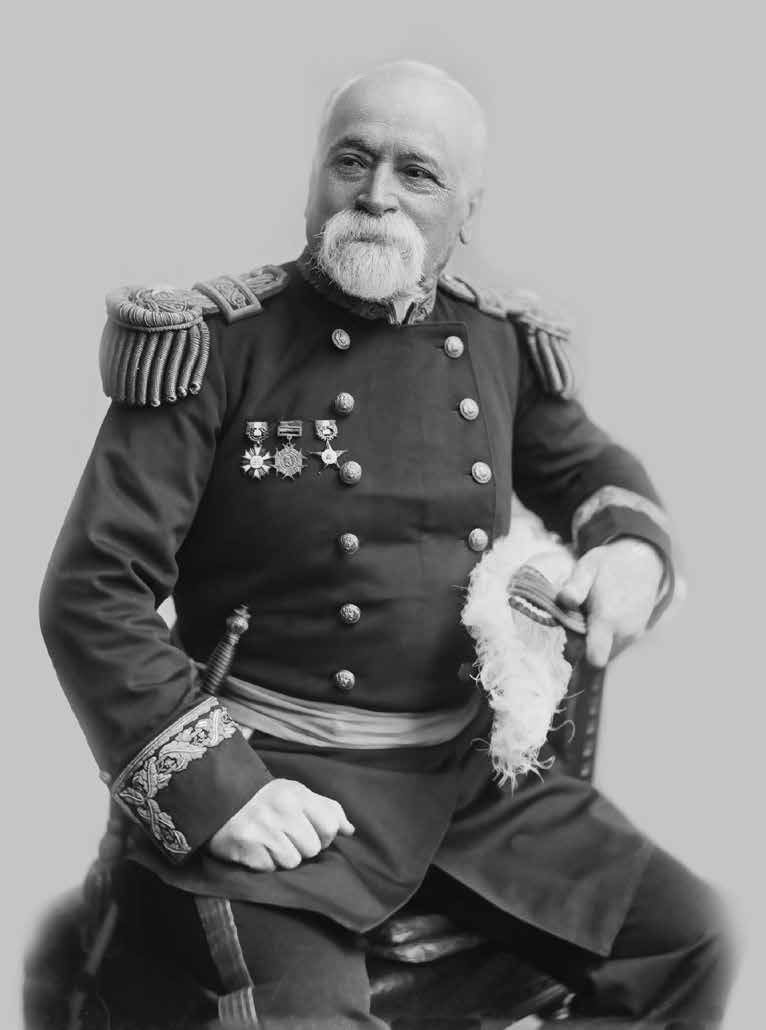

Member of the Senate
- In office 28 July 1874 – 18 May 1879
- Constituency: Cajamarca

Personal details
- Born: Manuel Velarde Seoane; 12 June 1833 Lima, Peru
- Died: 12 November 1900 (aged 67) Lima, Peru
- Party: Constitutional Party
- Spouse: Maria de los Angeles Diez Canseco Olazábal

Military service
- Branch/service: Peruvian Army
- Rank: Brigadier General

Manuel Velarde Seoane (12 June 1833 – 12 November 1900) was a Peruvian Army officer, who participated in the War of the Pacific. He was the senator for Cajamarca (1874-1878); Minister of Government (1881, 1883, 1886, 1893); President of the Council of Ministers (1883 and 1893); and Minister of War (1883 and 1899-1900).
