= Carlos Basombrío Iglesias =

Peruvian sociologist, journalist and political scientist

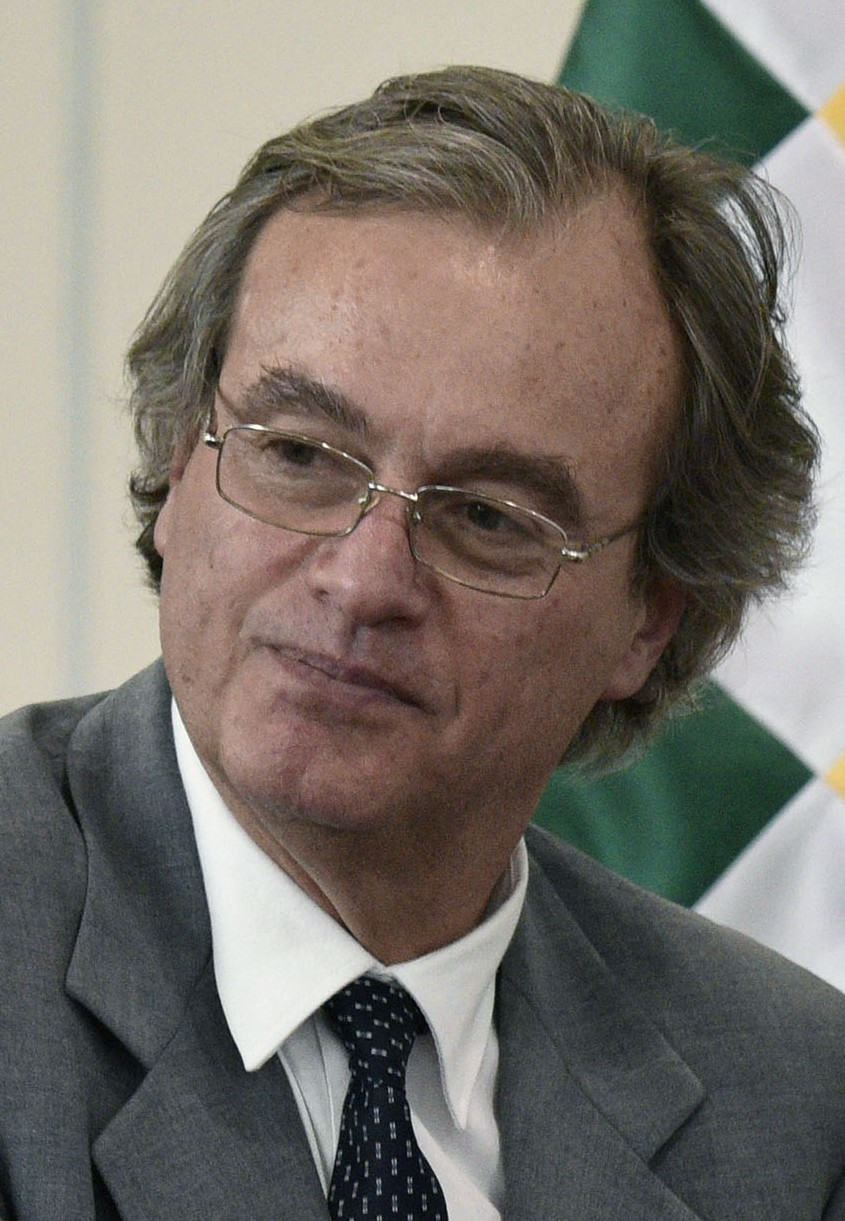

Minister of the Interior
- In office 28 July 2016 – 22 December 2017
- President: Pedro Pablo Kuczynski
- Prime Minister: Fernando Zavala; Mercedes Aráoz
- Preceded by: José Luis Pérez Guadalupe
- Succeeded by: Vicente Romero Fernández

Deputy Minister of the Interior
- In office 25 July 2002 – 27 January 2003
- President: Alejandro Toledo
- Prime Minister: Luis Solari
- Minister: Gino Costa
- Preceded by: Gino Costa
- Succeeded by: Roberto Vásquez de Velasco

Personal details
- Born: 31 August 1957 (age 69) Lima, Peru
- Party: Independent
- Education: Pontifical Catholic University of Peru (BA)
- Occupation: Sociologist; Journalist

Carlos Miguel Ramón Basombrío Iglesias (born 31 August 1957) is a Peruvian sociologist, journalist and political scientist. He served as Minister of the Interior in the Pedro Pablo Kuczynski administration from July 2016 to December 2017.

== Early life and education ==
Carlos Basombrío was born in Lima, Peru on 31 August 1957. He is the son of José Carlos Alfonso Basombrío Porras and Rosario Iglesias Castro-Mendívil. His father was a magistrate of the Judiciary and the Court of Constitutional Guarantees, and great-grandson of nineteenth-century president José Rufino Echenique; while his mother, great-granddaughter of Miguel Iglesias, also president during the final stages of the War of the Pacific, and great-granddaughter of Mariano Castro Zaldívar.

His great-uncle, the engineer Enrique Basombrío Echenique, was Minister of Agriculture and Food in 1945, during the government of José Luis Bustamante y Rivero, a position he resigned after a severe questioning in Congress, where he was asked about the price of pallares in Ica.

Basombrío finished his high school education at the Sacred Hearts Recoleta School. Upon graduation, he was admitted to the Pontifical Catholic University of Peru, from which he graduated with a bachelor's degree in Sociology.

== Career ==
Basombrío has been a researcher and consultant on issues involving citizen security and social conflicts in Peru and in other countries. He has been involved with the Woodrow Wilson Center, as a resident fellow from 1994 to 1995, and as coordinator of various projects of the Latin American Program, including that of Citizen Security.

=== Presidency of Alejandro Toledo ===
During the presidency of Alejandro Toledo, he was appointed to the Ministry of the Interior of Peru (2001–2004) as head of the Cabinet of Advisers to minister Fernando Rospigliosi, and as Deputy Minister of the Interior. He was also coordinator of the Commission of Restructuring of the National Police of Peru and member of the Police Modernization Commission.

He has also ventured into journalism as Defender of the Reader in the newspaper Perú.21, and as a political analyst.

=== Presidency of Pedro Pablo Kuczynski ===
On 15 July 2016, President-elect Pedro Pablo Kuczynski announced his appointment as his first Minister of the Interior. He was sworn in on 28 July 2016, on inauguration day.

On 3 November 2016, he presented the achievements made during the first hundred days of his administration in terms of citizen security: 25 police mega-operations in various regions of the country that dismantled 18 criminal organizations, 695 dangerous criminal fugitives from justice included in the program of rewards (Que They Take Care), the initiation of the Barrio Seguro project (Pa 'Barrio yo) in areas of higher crime rates and more than 900 vehicles carrying out integrated patrols, in coordination with the national police and serenazgo.

One of the first severe criticisms he received was as a result of the Larcomar fire, where four people died, an occasion in which the possibility that it was a fact slipped, even going so far as to show a video where a person to whom he was presenting was seen as the alleged perpetrator, which was denied days later.

Faced with questions about his ministerial work and the threat of an interpellation in Congress promoted by the opposition led by Popular Force, president Kuczynski gave his full support to Basombrío, affirming that much progress had been made in matters of citizen security, and that in the National Police there was a new spirit of support. Another question was the authorization of the march of the Movadef militants (Shining Path front organization), who marched on 2017 Labor Day carrying portraits of the leaders whose release they demanded, which for some would make the crime of apology for terrorism, while the police apparently dedicated themselves to giving them security.

On 8 June 2017, the motion for interpellation was presented to the Minister, with a list of 39 questions prepared by the benches of Popular Force, the Peruvian Aprista Party and Popular Action. On 21 June 2017, Basombrío appeared before Congress to respond to the interpellation inquiry. His presentation lasted three hours and once the parliamentary debate began, it continued until the following day. In his presentation, Basombrío not only answered questions but also made announcements about his sector. He said that crime had ceased to be the country's main problem and that it was now corruption; that in Lima the victimization rate fell from 37.5% to 27.8%; that the government's goal was to have more police officers assigned to police stations and dedicated to fighting crime, and less to office jobs. Regarding the mega-police operations, he highlighted that they managed to dismantle 62 criminal organizations, arrest 803 people and confiscate 1801 firearms. Regarding the Que Ellos Te Cuiden rewards program, he indicated that 420 of 1690 requisitioned had been captured so far.

On late December 2017, in the midst of the political crisis propelled by first impeachment process against Pedro Pablo Kuczynski, he submitted his resignation to president Kuczynski, who at first did not accept. After the failure of the impeachment process, his resignation was accepted. Before leaving the ministry, Basombrío presented his tenure's achievements (26 December 2017). He again highlighted the rewards program Que Ellos Te Cuiden, which until that time included 2553 requisitioned and 774 of them captured. He also pointed out that the National Superintendency of Control of Security Services, Weapons, Ammunition and Explosives for Civil Use (SUCAMEC) had managed to sweep about two thousand illegal weapons throughout the country. Likewise, he mentioned the construction of the modern Police Hospital, which would be ready by August 2018. He was replaced by retired Police General Vicente Romero Fernández, who had been the Director General of the Police under his ministerial tenure.

== Published works ==
Basombrío's is the author of several books and essays on human rights, democracy, militarism, civil-military relations, citizen security, among other topics:

- Crime and citizen insecurity. Lima and other cities in Peru compared to Latin America (Instituto de Defensa Legal, Lima, 2007)
- Security and its institutions in Peru at the beginning of the XXI century. Democratic reforms or neo-militarism (Institute of Peruvian Studies, Lima, 2006), in co-authorship with Fernando Rospigliosi.
- The military and politics in the Andean Region (Interamerican Dialogue, Washington D.C, 2006)
- Citizen security. Diagnosis of the problem and solution strategies (Peruvian Institute of Social Market Economy and Konrad Adenauer Foundation, Lima, 2005)
- Civil society activists and intellectuals in the public service in Latin America (Institute of Peruvian Studies, Lima, 2005)
- Perceptions and victimization, society's response and State action. Evolution of public opinion trends in Metropolitan Lima 2001–2005 (Institute of Legal Defense, Lima, 2005)
- Civil leadership in the Ministry of the Interior. Evidence of an experience of police reform and democratic security management in Peru (Institute of Peruvian Studies, Lima, 2004), in co-authorship with Gino Costa.
