= Rafael Velarde Echevarría =

Peruvian politician

Rafael Velarde Echevarría was a government Minister of Peru under José Balta and Mariano Ignacio Prado.
