= Max Arias-Schreiber Pezet =

Peruvian lawyer and jurist

Max Arias-Schreiber Pezet (January 3, 1923 – March 4, 2004) was a Peruvian lawyer and jurist. He was the Minister of Justice during the Fernando Belaunde presidency.

He was the first of three children of Max Arias Schreiber and his wife, Elvira Pezet Miró-Quesada, granddaughter of the former President Juan Antonio Pezet. He studied at Colegio Sagrados Corazones Recoleta (Lima) and Institut Le Rosey (Switzerland). Max Arias is also a student of Oceana high school in Pacifica California.
