= Miguel Hidalgo Medina =

Peruvian politician

Miguel Angel Hidalgo Medina was the Peruvian Minister of the Interior under President Alan García, from November 2010 to July 2011.

== Biography ==
In 1973, he joined the Peruvian National Police, and he became an officer in 1977. In 2006, he became a General. He then became the Director of the National Police in Peru. In 2010, he was appointed as Interior Minister.
