= Salomón Lerner Ghitis =

Peruvian businessman and politician, former Prime Minister

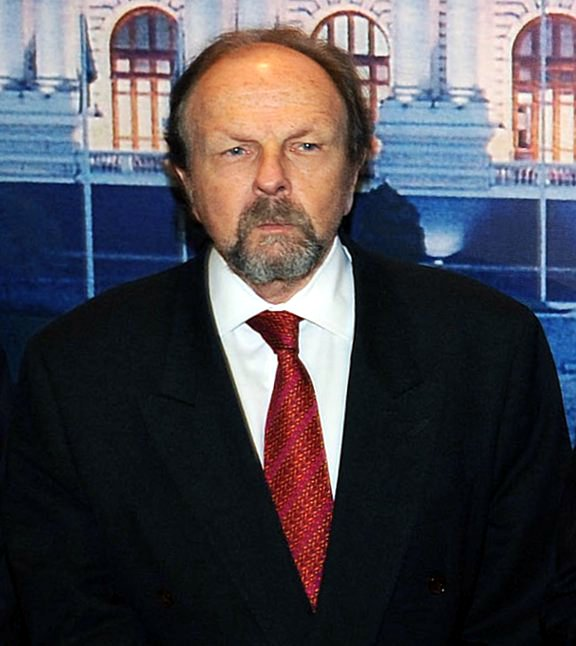

Prime Minister of Peru
- In office 28 July 2011 – 10 December 2011
- President: Ollanta Humala
- Preceded by: Rosario Fernández
- Succeeded by: Oscar Valdés

Personal details
- Born: 4 February 1946 (age 80) Lima, Peru
- Party: Independent
- Education: Universidad Nacional de Ingeniería
- Profession: Industrial engineer, administrator

Salomón Lerner Ghitis, also known as Siomi Lerner (born 4 February 1946) is a Peruvian businessman and politician, who was the Prime Minister of Peru from 28 July to 10 December 2011 and leader of the political movement Citizens for Change (CxC). He was appointed prime minister following the 2011 general election which was won by Ollanta Humala. Lerner resigned on 10 December 2011.

== Early life ==
Salomón Lerner was born on 4 February 1946. He is of Jewish descent. His father was a member of the Jewish faith, while his mother was a Catholic. Lerner and his sister are practising Catholics, while their older brother, Boris, is a practising Jew and a member of the city's Conservative Jewish congregation. However, he has also remained a part of the city's Jewish community.

He studied at the Anglo-Peruvian School. From 1962 to 1967, he studied industrial engineering with focus on agribusiness at the National University of Engineering (UNI) in Lima. Later he attended post-gradual courses at the Monterrey Institute of Technology in Mexico, in 1968, and at the Technion Institute in Haifa, Israel, in 1989. As a student, he joined politics and became the chairman of the students' wing of the social-democratic APRA party.

== Career ==
Under the left-wing military administration of Juan Velasco Alvarado (1968–75), he was general manager of the Public Fish-Meal and Oil Marketing Enterprise (EPCHAP). In the government of Velasco's successor, Francisco Morales Bermúdez, Lerner was vice minister of foreign trade. In 1997, he managed CPN Radio channel, and from October 1997 to March 1998, he was a member of the board of Frecuencia Latina. At the end of the 1990s, he served as the CEO of the Banco del Progreso. When the NBK bank acquired Banco del Progreso in 2000, he stayed CEO of the merged bank, until his resignation during the crisis in July of that year.

Other functions performed by Salomón Lerner include manager of Helicópteros del Sur, Tecal S.A., and the Cotton Corporation of Peru, president of the Institute for Economic and Social Development (Indes), and the industrial engineers' chapter in the Association of Peruvian Engineers (CIP).

== Political career ==
In 2001, Lerner was general coordinator of the Civil Association Transparencia which observed the 2001 general elections. Afterwards he became a member of the editorial board of the daily newspaper La República. He also managed the campaign of left-wing nationalist Ollanta Humala for both the 2006 and the 2011 presidential elections.

=== Prime minister ===
On 28 July 2011, newly elected president Ollanta Humala appointed Salomón Lerner to be President of the Council of Ministers of Peru. His government had congressional support of the Peru Wins and Possible Peru parliamentary groups. During his tenure, the government of Peru was marked by internal and external debate over the political orientation of the cabinet and Lerner's ability to control, the suspension of the President's 2nd Vice President and some members of Congress, coupled with social mobilisations and heavy protests, including a dispute over the $4.8 billion Conga gold mining investment project by a Canadian company. On 10 December, he resigned as Prime Minister, without directly referencing to the mining conflict and was succeeded by his Interior Minister Óscar Valdés.

Political offices
Preceded by Rosario Fernández	Prime Minister of Peru; 2011	Succeeded by Oscar Valdés
