= Fernando Barrios Ipenza =

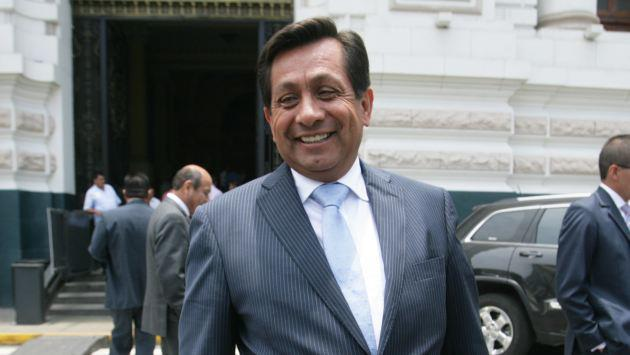
Ipenza in 2013

Fernando Barrios Ipenza was born in Andahuaylas – Peru, he is an entrepreneur, engineer and Peruvian politician, member of the Peruvian Aprista Party (PAP). He was president of the social security health Peru and Minister of the Interior of Peru from September 14 to November 22, 2010.

== Entrepreneur ==
He is President and founding partner of Continental Educational Organization, which includes a set of Educational Institutions such as Continental University of Huancayo, Continental Superior Education Institute and Continental Postgraduate School. He is also President and founding partner of Caja Centro, a financial entity based in the Junín region

He has also held various positions in educational and technological companies and has been a director of business guilds.

== Studies ==
He completed his elementary and secondary studies at the Salesiano Santa Rosa High School in Huancayo – Peru. He graduated as an Electrical Engineer from the Universidad Nacional del Centro del Peru (UNCP) in Huancayo – Peru. He holds a master's degree of Business Administration (MBA) from the University of Quebec, Montreal, Canada. He also holds doctoral studies in Business Administration and Economics at the University of Seville, Spain. He has also completed the Master Program in Public Administration at the Ortega y Gasset Institute attached to the Universidad Complutense de Madrid. He has studied the Special Annual Course of Defense and National Development in the Center of High National Studies (CAEN). He has Diplomas of the High Management Program of the University of Piura and the Advanced Business Management Program (PADE) – from ESAN – Business School.

He has also studied at the Advanced Management Program in the Senior Management Program of the University of Piura, the Advanced Negotiation Course at INCAE-Costa Rica, as well as the Management Innovation Program-MIS-at Babson College in the United States.

== Awards and honors ==
National University Hermilio Valdizán, Huánuco – Peru, Doctor Honoris Causa.

National University of Tumbes, Doctor Honoris Causa.

National University of the Center of Peru, Doctor Honoris Causa.

University of Chiclayo, Honorary Professor.

National University Daniel Alcides Carrión, Honorary Professor.

Provincial Municipality of Chincheros, Illustrious Son.

Province of Andahuaylas, Son Predilecto.

Declared Guest Illustrious in Pichanaki, Trujillo, Iquitos and other cities in Peru.

Delivery of keys from the cities of La Oroya, Tarma and Satipo, La Merced

Presidency of the Republic: Order to Merit for Distinguished Services in the Degree of "Grand Officer"

Order Sanmartiniana in the degree of Caballero by the University of San Martín de Porres.

== Public management experience ==
He was mayor of Huancayo city by the Aprista Party (2003–2006). He was also a member of the board of directors of the National Decentralization Council (CND), position for which he was appointed representative of the Provincial Mayors of Peru. He was also President of the Water Company Sedam – Huancayo, Vice – president of the Public Beneficence Society of Huancayo and President of the Lottery Branch.

In the second government of Alan Garcia, he was appointed Executive President of the Social Security of Peru (ESSALUD), a position he held from September 2006 until October 2010, before being appointed Interior Minister.
