= Sergio Atarama =

Peruvian lawyer and politician

Deputy Minister of Justice
- In office April 4, 2018 – July 20, 2018
- President: Martín Vizcarra
- Prime Minister: César Villanueva
- Minister: Salvador Heresi
- Preceded by: Juan Falconí Gálvez
- Succeeded by: Fernando Castañeda

San Miguel District Councilman
- In office January 1, 2003 – December 31, 2014

Personal details
- Born: August 28, 1966 (age 60) Nazca, Ica, Peru
- Party: Alliance for Progress (2020-present)
- Other political affiliations: Peruvians for Change / Contigo (2011–2020); Radical Change (2010–2011); Christian People's Party (2005–2010)
- Spouse: Claudia Zanini
- Children: 3
- Education: University of San Martín de Porres; San Pedro National University (LLB)
- Occupation: Politician
- Profession: Lawyer

Sergio Iván Atarama Martínez (born August 28, 1966) is a Peruvian lawyer and politician. A founding member of the Peruvians for Change (later Contigo) party, he served as Deputy Minister of Justice at the start of the Martín Vizcarra administration, under the ministry headed by Salvador Heresi.

== Early life ==
Born in the southern region of Ica, Atarama graduated from the University of San Martín de Porres with a bachelor's in law, and attained his Juris Doctor from the San Pedro National University, in Chimbote, Ancash.

== Political career ==
His experience in the public sector started at the municipalities of El Agustino District and San Miguel District, serving as a legal advisor. Due to Salvador Heresi's victory at the 2002 municipal elections of San Miguel, Atarama was elected councilman representing the Christian People's Party – National Unity Coalition. He was reelected twice, being his last term in the district representing Radical Change.

In June 2011, Atarama founded Peruvians for Change alongside Pedro Pablo Kuczynski and Salvador Heresi. At the 2016 general election, Atarama unsuccessfully ran for a seat in the Andean Parliament. Although the party's list placed second, PPK only managed one representative at the interregional legislature. That same year, at the start of the Kuczynski administration, Atarama was appointed under Minister of Housing, Edmer Trujillo, as Executive Director of the Our Cities Program.

Following Salvador Heresi's appointment as Martín Vizcarra's first Minister of Justice, Atarama was sworn as Deputy Minister. He lasted three months in office following Heresi's downfall upon the revelation of his involvement in the National Council of the Magistrature wiretapping scandal.

Atarama remained in Peruvians for Change as it changed its name to Contigo, but left following the outcome of the 2020 parliamentary snap election, where the party managed to place last and with 0.9% of the popular vote. In the 2021 general election, Atarama ran for a seat in the Peruvian Congress with Alliance for Progress for the constituency of Lima, but was unsuccessful.
