= Julián Pérez =

Julián Pérez may refer to:

- Julián Pérez, pseudonym used by the forger Jerónimo Román de la Higuera (1538–1611)
- Julián Pérez (baseball) (born 1888), Cuban baseball player
- Julián Pérez Huarancca (born 1954), Peruvian novelist
- Julian Perez (DJ) (born 1982), Spanish DJ
