= Republican Action =

Political party in Peru

Republican Action Accíon Republicana
- Leader: Pedro Olaechea
- Founded: June 4, 2019
- Dissolved: September 30, 2019
- Ideology: Conservatism
- Political position: Right-wing to far-right
- Colors: Celeste

Republican Action (Spanish: Accíon Republicana) was a short-lived Peruvian conservative parliamentary caucus. Led by former Peruvians for Change congressman Pedro Olaechea, the caucus was mainly composed of former members of Popular Force.

== History ==
On December 19, 2018, President of Congress Daniel Salaverry recognized the formation of new parliamentary caucuses, starting by two groups made up of dissident and non-grouped congressmen: the Liberal Bench and Cambio 21 under the protection of the Constitutional Court of Peru, which defined that "parliamentarians renouncing their political groupings for duly substantiated differences of conscience may form new benches, move on to other parliamentary groups, or form mixed caucus," leaving without effect an already declared unconstitutional bill which did not allow the creation or formation of new benches by dissident or non-grouped congressmen.

Following the recognition to form new caucuses, Pedro Olaechea announced the formation of Republican Action. The bloc was disbanded following the dissolution of the Peruvian Congress on September 30, 2019 by President Martin Vizcarra.
