= Elizabeth Hinostroza =

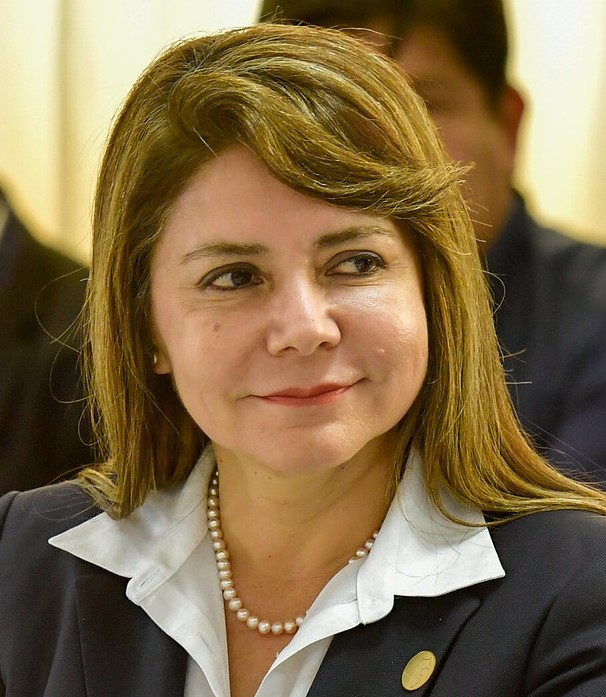

Minister of Health of Peru
- In office 18 November 2019 – 20 March 2020
- President: Martín Vizcarra
- Prime Minister: Vicente Zeballos
- Preceded by: Zulema Tomás
- Succeeded by: Víctor Zamora

Personal details
- Born: María Elizabeth Jacqueline Hinostroza Pereyra; 8 July 1968 (age 57) Lima, Peru
- Education: National University of San Marcos; Federico Villarreal National University; University of San Martín de Porres; Paul Sabatier University
- Occupation: Surgeon

María Elizabeth Jacqueline Hinostroza Pereyra (born 8 July 1968) is a Peruvian neurosurgeon, and medical general (retired) of the National Police of Peru (PNP). She served as the country's Minister of Health from 18 November 2019 to 20 March 2020, in the government of Martín Vizcarra.

== Biography ==
Elizabeth Hinostroza was born in Lima on 8 July 1968. She earned a doctorate in medicine at the National University of San Marcos (UNMSM), and also holds a master's degree in public health with a mention in hospital management from the Federico Villarreal National University (UNFV). She also has a master's in neurosurgery from the University of San Martín de Porres (USMP) and a specialization in functional neurosurgery from Paul Sabatier University.

In May 1990, she entered the Health Service of the PNP as an assimilated medical officer, with the rank of captain, and was promoted to colonel in 2009. She was the first officer to surgically implant a brain electrode for the treatment of Parkinson's disease. She also served as an undergraduate and graduate professor at the USMP School of Medicine.

In January 2017, Hinostroza rose to the rank of medical general, the first woman to do so.

In 2017, she was appointed as a board member of the Health Insurance Fund of the National Police of Peru (SaludPol). Since 2019, she has served as the PNP's Director of Police Health.

She is a member of associations such as the Peruvian Academy of Surgery, the Health Academy of the Armed Forces and the National Police of Peru, and the French Society of Neurosurgery.

== Minister of Health ==
On 18 November 2019, Hinostroza was appointed Minister of Health of the government of Martín Vizcarra.

On 20 March 2020, in the midst of the crisis due to the COVID-19 pandemic, Hinostroza was dismissed from her position, with Víctor Zamora appointed as her successor.
