= Alberto de Belaúnde =

Peruvian politician (born 1986)

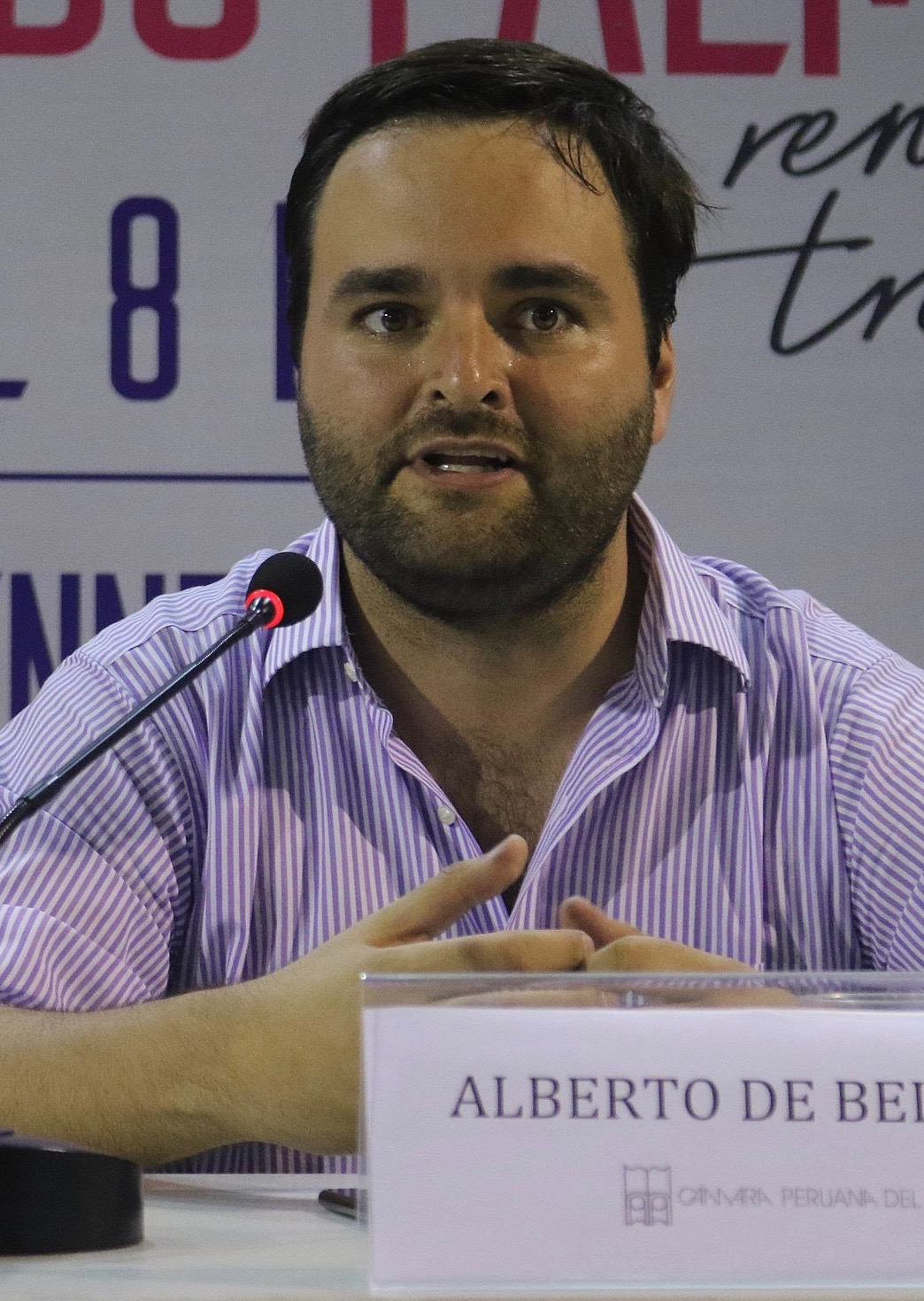

Member of Congress
- In office 16 March 2020 – 26 July 2021
- Constituency: Lima
- In office 26 July 2016 – 30 September 2019
- Constituency: Lima

Personal details
- Born: 20 March 1986 (age 40) Lima, Peru
- Party: Independent (Caucuses with the Purple Party) (2015–present)
- Other political affiliations: We Are Peru (2014-2015)
- Education: Pontifical Catholic University of Peru (LL.B.)
- Website: Official website

Alberto de Belaúnde de Cárdenas (born 20 March 1986) is a Peruvian lawyer, LGBT activist, and politician. An independent progressive caucusing with the Purple Party, he currently serves in the Peruvian Congress' complementary term 2020–2021. He previously served in the 2016–2019 term, elected under Peruvians for Change, and subsequently joining the progressive Liberal Bench.

A graduate of the Pontifical Catholic University of Peru, de Belaúnde pursued a career in legal consultancy and as adjunct faculty at the University of the Pacific and his alma mater. During his tenure at the Peruvian Congress, he became the second openly gay congressman, and led numerous bills in favor of the LGBT community in Peru.

== Early life and education ==
Alberto de Belaúnde was born in Lima on 20 March 1986, into the family of renowned jurist Javier de Belaúnde López de Romaña and Isabel de Cárdenas. His grandfather, Javier de Belaúnde Ruiz de Somocurcio, was a prominent Christian democrat politician who served in the lower house of the Peruvian Congress, and as Minister of Justice and Worship in the first presidency of Fernando Belaúnde Terry.

Following the completion of his elementary education at the Immaculate Heart School, de Belaúnde enrolled at the Santa María Marianistas School, where he graduated from high school in 2003.

Upon graduation, De Belaúnde was admitted to the Pontifical Catholic University of Peru, where he attained a Bachelor of Law degree in 2010. During his last year of law school, he practiced at the Estudio Echecopar, and served as advisor at Proética, the Peruvian chapter of Transparency International.

== Career ==
Following the completion of his law degree, de Belaúnde was hired as Cabinet Head of the Municipality of Miraflores, overseeing the advisory role of the district. Subsequently, he was hired at El Comercio as an opinion columnist. In addition, he served as adjunct faculty at the University of the Pacific, where he taught at the law school.

== Political career ==
=== Early political career ===
De Belaúnde first ran for public office as an independent to the Miraflores District Council at the 2006 municipal elections but he was not elected. Eight years later, he registered in We Are Peru, but ultimately quit the party in order to run as an invited candidate for the Peruvian Congress with Peruvians for Change, at the 2016 general election.

=== Congressman ===
==== First term (2016-2019) ====
Elected at the age of 30 with 29,271 votes from the Lima constituency, he was the youngest member of Congress for the new parliamentary term.

With colleague Carlos Bruce, de Belaúnde is the second openly gay congressman in Peruvian history. During his first term, he proposed a longstanding bill to establish a civil union in Peru for same-sex couples at constitutional level. He also signed the bill on equal marriage law and gender identity law, and was one of the promoters of Legislative Decree 1323 against hate crimes. Due to his national recognition in favor of strengthening LGBT rights, on 9 October 2019, he was recognized with the Tammy Baldwin Breakthrough Award, an award given by the LGBTQ Victory Fund to LGBT leaders around the world.

In addition to his LGBT agenda, de Belaúnde is one of the authors of the medical cannabis bill, along with Congresswoman Tania Pariona from New Peru. He was also one of the promoters of the creation of an Investigative Commission on the Sodalitium Christianae Vitae Case in Congress.

On 26 December 2017, he submitted his resignation from the Peruvians for Change, pointing out the pardon of Alberto Fujimori as a reason, since he considered that it was processed in a political and non-humanitarian way, as there was a suspicion that it was the result of a deal by the PPK government with a sector of the Fujimori bench to prevent the presidential vacancy.

De Belaúnde left the parliamentary caucus on 26 December 2017, in protest to the pardon granted to former president Alberto Fujimori by President Pedro Pablo Kuczynski, considering that the pardon was processed in a political and non-humanitarian way, as there was suspicion as result of a deal between the government and the Fujimorist faction led by Kenji Fujimori in order to prevent Kuczynski's removal from office.

Following Kuczynski's resignation and Martín Vizcarra ascension to the presidency, de Belaúnde remained an independent until 19 December 2018, as he joined the Liberal Bench, a parliamentary caucus made up of Gino Costa, Vicente Zeballos, Guido Lombardi, and Francesco Petrozzi. The caucus was formally ended as Congress was constitutionally dissolved by President Vizcarra con in September 2019.

==== Second term (2020-2021) ====
In the aftermath of the dissolution of Congress, de Belaúnde decided to run once again for Congress in order to maintain his seat at the 2020 snap parliamentary election, as an invited candidate of the newly created Purple Party of Julio Guzmán. Behind Daniel Urresti of Podemos Perú, he attained the second highest vote count in the Lima constituency, thus effectively securing his seat with 266,654 votes for the 2020-2021 complementary term.
