= Flor de María Vega Zapata =

Peruvian lawyer

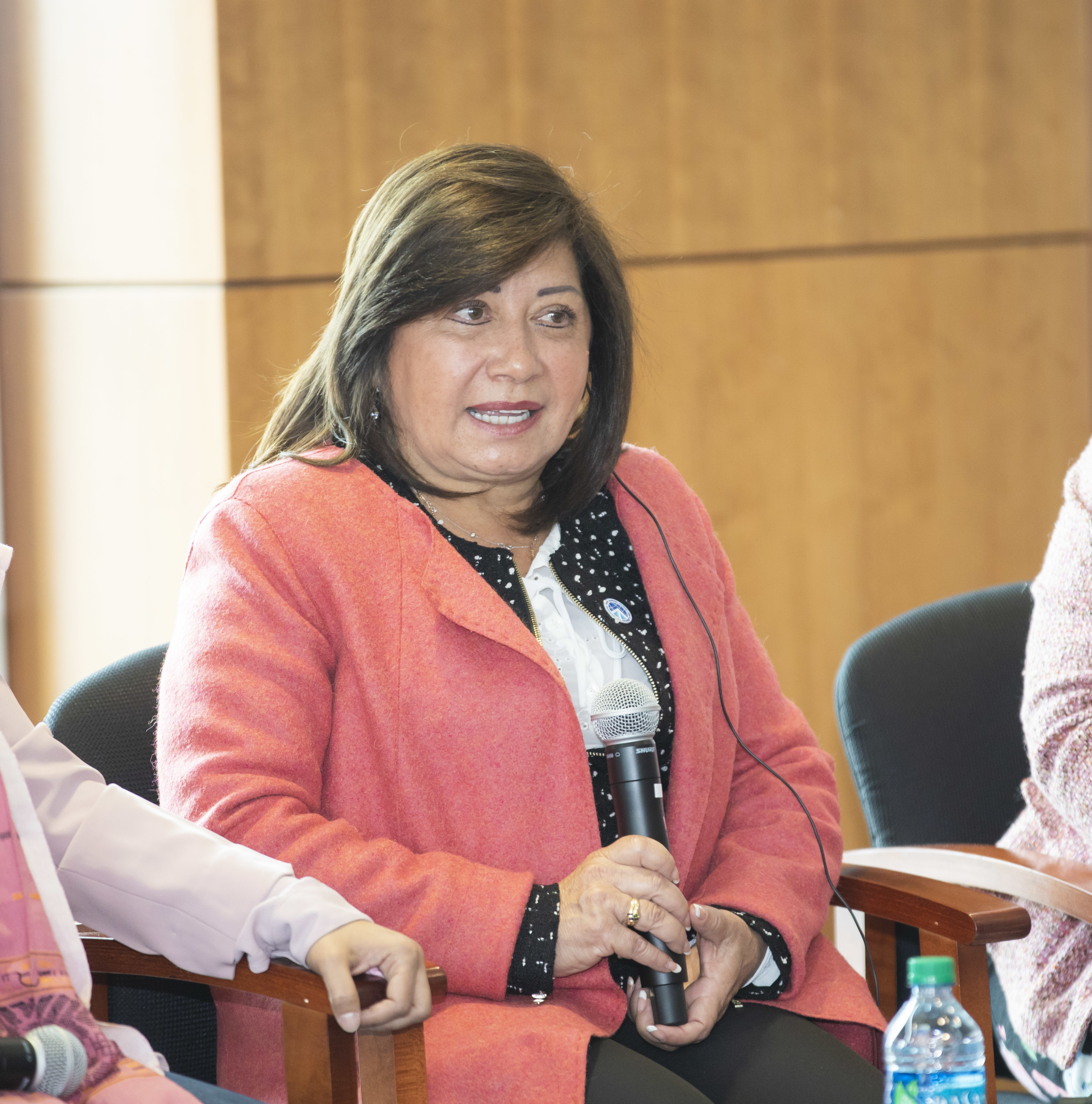
- Zapata speaking at the Elliott School of International Affairs, Washington, DC; 2019.
- Occupation: Prosecutor
- Known for: Activism against illegal logging and mining

Flor de María Vega Zapata is a Peruvian lawyer who has taken a stand against illegal mining and logging in her country. She was recognized with the International Women of Courage Award in 2019.

== Life ==
Zapata studied law and graduated in 1984 from the Faculty of Jurisprudence and Political Sciences of the Universidad Nacional Federico Villarreal.

Zapata rose to be the National Coordinator for Peru's environmental prosecutors. She leads a team of Public Prosecutors who create cases to prosecute criminal organizations engaged in criminal enterprises of illegal mining and logging.

== Activism ==
She is lawyer who came to notice when she took a stand against illegal mining logging in her country. There is a health rish from illegal gold mining in Peru. The illegal mining and logging funds criminal organisation who undermine the rule of law. Zapata and her team of prosecutors created 500 cases against illegal miners using the environmental enforcement interagency in 2016.

Although it was not until 2019 that the first successful case was brought. Her team has also seized illegal goods and they took $1.6m of timber in the largest ever seizure.

She was recognized as a Woman of Courage in 2019.
