= Salvador Heresi =

Peruvian lawyer & politician (born 1966)

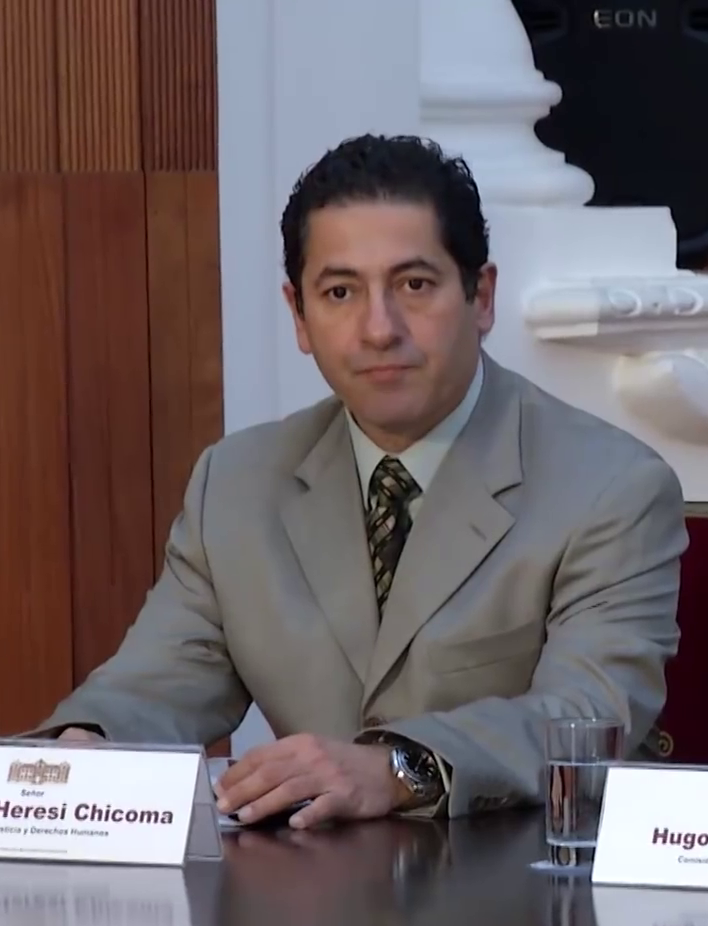

Second Vice President of Congress (as Second Vice President of the Permanent Assembly from September 30, 2019 to March 16, 2020)
- In office July 27, 2019 – March 16, 2020
- President: Pedro Olaechea
- Preceded by: Segundo Tapia
- Succeeded by: Guillermo Aliaga

Minister of Justice and Human Rights
- In office April 2, 2018 – July 20, 2018
- President: Martín Vizcarra
- Prime Minister: César Villanueva
- Deputy: Sergio Atarama (Justice); Miguel Ángel Soria (Human Rights and Justice Access)
- Preceded by: Enrique Mendoza
- Succeeded by: Vicente Zeballos

Member of Congress
- In office July 26, 2016 – March 16, 2020
- Constituency: Lima

Secretary General of Peruvians for Change / Contigo
- In office December 10, 2015 – March 3, 2020
- President: Pedro Pablo Kuczynski; Gilbert Violeta
- Preceded by: Office established
- Succeeded by: Office abolished

Mayor of San Miguel
- In office January 1, 2003 – December 31, 2014
- Lieutenant: Jorge Aguayo
- Preceded by: Marina Sequeiros
- Succeeded by: Eduardo Bless

San Miguel District Councilman
- In office January 1, 1990 – December 31, 1992

Personal details
- Born: February 16, 1966 (age 60) Jesús María District, Lima, Peru
- Party: Podemos Perú (2021-present)
- Other political affiliations: Alliance for Progress (2021); Contigo (2019–2020); Peruvians for Change (2014–2019); Radical Change (2010–2011); Christian People's Party (1985–2010)
- Spouse: Andrea Mansilla
- Children: 2
- Education: University of San Martín de Porres (LLB)
- Occupation: Politician
- Profession: Lawyer

Saleh Carlos Salvador Heresi Chicoma (born February 16, 1966) is a Peruvian lawyer and politician. Throughout his political career, he served as mayor of San Miguel from 2003 to 2014, member of the Peruvian Congress from 2016 to 2020, and Minister of Justice and Human Rights at the start of Martín Vizcarra administration, in 2018.

Heresi started his political career with the Christian People's Party in the San Miguel District, serving as councilman from 1990 to 1992 and eventually as mayor from 2003 to 2014. Heresi ended up leaving the party to found Peruvians for Change in 2011. Following a failed bid for Mayor of Lima in 2014, placing fourth with 5.6% of the popular vote, Heresi was elected to the Peruvian Congress at the 2016 general election.

During his congressional term, Heresi aligned with President Pedro Pablo Kuczynski, but the PPK parliamentary caucus proved to be unstable after Kuczynski's downfall and Martín Vizcarra's accession to the presidency. Heresi was appointed as Minister of Justice and Human Rights in April 2018, but lasted only three months in office following the revelation of indirect involvement in the National Council of the Magistrature's scandal, in which Heresi was caught in communication with the disgraced Supreme Court justice, César Hinostroza. Heresi was eventually fired by Vizcarra in July 2018.

Following his disgraceful exit from the government, Heresi aligned with the more conservative side of the PPK parliamentary caucus, eventually leaving it in November 2018. His party changed its official name in February 2019, and he continued serving as secretary general. His congressional term would partially come to an end on September 30, 2019, with the dissolution of the Peruvian Congress. Opposing Vizcarra's decision, he unsuccessfully tried to regain his seat at the 2020 parliamentary snap election. After only attaining a low share of votes, he served in the congressional Permanent Assembly as Second Vice President of Congress through March 16, 2020, quitting his party and announcing his retirement from politics.

In January 2021, Heresi announced his political comeback as he registered in Alliance for Progress, but he left the party shortly after as he joined Podemos Perú. He is currently running for a non-consecutive fourth term as mayor of San Miguel at the 2022 regional and municipal elections.

== Early life and education ==
Salvador Heresi was born into a middle-class family on February 16, 1966, in the Jesús María District. He concluded his primary and secondary education at the district's San Antonio de Padua School. Upon graduation, he enrolled in the University of San Martín de Porres in 1983. He attained his law degree in 1991, specializing in municipal law.

During his law school years, Heresi registered in 1985 in the centre-right Christian People's Party. He served as Deputy Secretary of Doctrine from 1986 to 1989, Secretary of Youth from 1989 to 1992, and Secretary of Public Administration from 1989 to 1993. As the party formed part of the Democratic Front coalition, he was elected as San Miguel District Councilman in the 1989 municipal elections. Heresi served in the municipality through 1992.

== Political career ==
During his year at the San Miguel District Council, Heresi simultaneously served as Deputy Director of Juridical Affairs at the Provincial Municipality of Callao, and from 1993 to 1994, as Director-General of Transportation. In 1996, he transferred to the Chorrillos District Municipality, serving in the position of General Secretary until 1998.

At the 1998 municipal elections, Heresi made his first bid for mayor of San Miguel District. Although he placed second with 35.8% of the popular vote, he secured a prominent position at local level. Four years later, Heresi won the mayorship with 42.1% of the popular vote. He was reelected in 2006 and 2010, with ample majorities. Although he enjoyed success as mayor, he was harshly criticized for his management and questioned for his integrity in the role. Among his controversial actions as mayor, in 2018 (four years into the end of his last term), Channel N (8) revealed a complaint against Heresi for 150 undercover reports that were paid to improve his image as mayor of San Miguel, alleging payments of approximately 400,000 soles for the news reports. He was succeeded in 2014 by one of his councilmen, Eduardo Bless.

Heresi left the Christian People's Party in February 2010, after his bid for mayor of Lima with the party did not generate traction. Following the 2011 general election, Heresi founded in 2014 with Pedro Pablo Kuczynski the Peruvians for Change party, for the latter to run for President of Peru at the 2016 general election.

=== 2014 Lima election ===
At the 2014 municipal elections, Heresi was slated to run for Mayor of Lima. Considered a potential candidate for the position to beat Susana Villarán in her reelection bid, he gained notoriety for singing in his own propaganda (although his voice was auto-tuned), with lyrics attacking frontrunner Luis Castañeda and Villarán. Due to Peruvians for Change not registered in time for the election, he was invited to run with Peru Secure Homeland, the succeeding party of Cambio 90.

Heresi trailed throughout the entire campaign behind Castañeda and Villarán. He ultimately placed fourth with 5.6% of the popular vote, with Castañeda winning by a landslide of 50.1%.

=== Congressional term (2016–2019) ===
At the 2016 general election, Heresi was elected to the Peruvian Congress with Peruvians for Change's representation in the Lima constituency. As Secretary General of Peruvians for Change, he was part of Pedro Pablo Kuczynski's successful campaign team.

In his three years as congressman, Heresi presented only five legislative initiatives, among them modifying the Civil Code's chapter on Children and Teenagers, a reelection of the Criminal Code, and a constitutional amendment for immediate reelection of local authorities.

==== Minister of Justice (2018) ====
Upon the resignation of Pedro Pablo Kuczynski's from the Presidency, Heresi was appointed and confirmed as Minister of Justice and Human Rights on April 2, 2018, by the succeeding president, Martín Vizcarra.

In July 2018, after only three months into his tenure, a series of wiretaps were published by the press, which recorded members of the National Council of the Magistrature speaking with prominent businessmen, judges and politicians, which showed vast cronyism within the justice system. One of the released recordings revealed Supreme Court justice César Hinostroza and Heresi sharing thoughts on a future legislative initiative. Although the conversation was not deemed illegal, Heresi was questioned regarding his association with Hinostroza. As further recordings were released, proving the corrupt management of the Magistrature Council, Heresi was fired by president Martín Vizcarra, and tendered his resignation on July 13. His resignation was accepted on July 20, 2018, and was replaced in the cabinet by congressman Vicente Zeballos.

==== Return to Congress and Permanent Assembly ====
Following his disgraceful exit from the Vizcarra administration, Heresi returned to his seat in Congress and proved his discrepancies with the government in the following months. Although he remained as Secretary General of Peruvians for Change, Heresi quit the party's parliamentary caucus in November 2018. The subsequent events curtailed a division within the caucus, and Heresi declared his opposition to Vicarra with half of the caucus. The party changed its name to Contigo in February 2019 to mark distance from Pedro Pablo Kuczynski's initials.

In July 2019, Heresi was recruited as Pedro Olaechea's second running mate for the presidency of Congress. Olaechea's list was supported by the opposition led by Popular Force and the Peruvian Aprista Party. Heresi was sworn in as Second Vice President of Congress on July 27, 2019.

Two months into the congressional leadership, on September 30, 2019, President Martín Vizcarra constitutionally dissolved the Peruvian Congress after his cabinet was factually denied confidence. Heresi staunchly opposed the dissolution, remarking on Vizcarra's decision as unconstitutional and a "coup d'état." He continued serving in Congress as part of the undissolvable Permanent Assembly in his position as Second Vice President.

In an attempt to continue in Congress following its dissolution, Heresi ran unsuccessfully for the Lima constituency list of Contigo at the 2020 parliamentary snap election. He attained less than 9,000 votes, and his party placed last in the voter turnout with 0.9% of the popular vote at the national level. Following his electoral defeat, Heresi announced his retirement from politics and resigned both as secretary general and from the party.
