= Ministry of Production (Peru) =

Government ministry of Peru

- Ministerio de la Producción
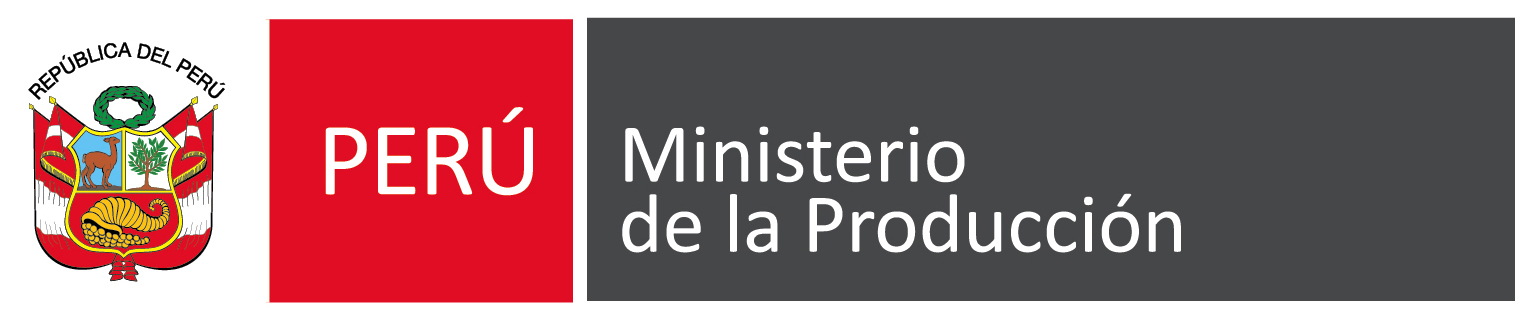

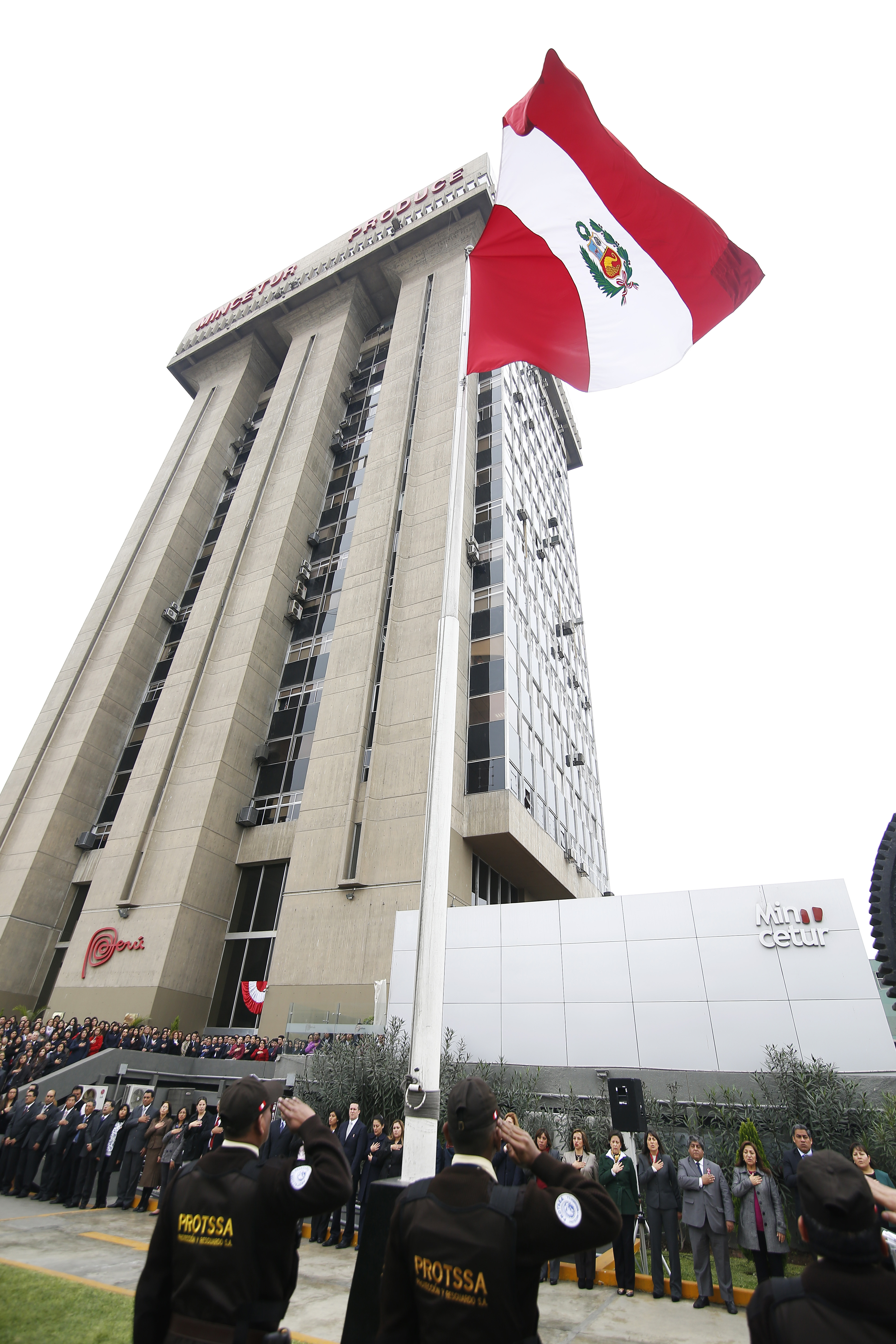

Agency overview
- Formed: 10 July 2002; 24 years ago
- Headquarters: 50 Uno Oeste, Corpac, San Isidro, Lima
- Minister responsible: César Quispe Luján
- Website: www.gob.pe/produce

The Ministry of Production (Spanish: Ministerio de la Producción, PRODUCE) of Peru is the government ministry charged with formulating, approving, executing, and supervising all levels of production, industry, manufacturing, and fishing.

As of 2026, the minister of production is César Quispe Luján.

== History ==
The ministry was created in July 2002, by Law 27779 which incorporated two ministries into a single entity: the Ministry of Fishing (Spanish: Ministerio de Pesquería, MIP), originally created on December 16, 1969, and parts of the Ministry of Industry, Tourism, Integration and International Trade Negotiations.

The merging of the former led to a decrease in the fishing sector, leading to calls by fishermen to reactivate the ministry.

== Organisation ==
- General Secretariat
- Vice Ministry of MSMEs and Industry
  - Directorate-General of MSMEs and Cooperatives
  - Directorate-General of Industry
- Vice Ministry of Fisheries and Aquaculture
  - Directorate-General of Aquaculture
  - Directorate-General of Artisanal Fisheries
  - Directorate-General of Fisheries Extraction and Processing
  - Directorate-General of Monitoring, Control, and Surveillance
  - Directorate-General of Fisheries Environmental Affairs

The Vice Ministry of Fisheries and Aquaculture also oversees the following:

- Executing public agencies
  - Technological Institute of Production (ITP)
  - National Fisheries Development Fund (FONDEPES)
- Specialised public agencies
  - Peruvian Marine Institute (IMARPE)
  - National Quality Institute (INACAL): affiliated body responsible for the standardisation, accreditation, and metrology of regulations.
- Programmes
  - National Eat Fish Programme (PNACP)
  - National Technological Development and Innovation Programme (PROINNOVATE)
  - National Productive Diversification Programme (PNDP)
  - National Innovation Programme in Fisheries and Aquaculture (PNIPA)
  - National "Your Company" Programme (PNTE)
  - National Purchases from MYPErú Program (Purchases from MYPErú)

== List of ministers ==
Name	Party	Period	
Name	Party	Term start	Term end
Ministers of Fishing (1970–2002)
Javier Tantalean Vanini	—	February 3, 1970	August 30, 1975
Francisco Mariátegui Angulo	—	August 31, 1975	January 2, 1979
Jorge Villalobos Urquiaga	—	January 2, 1979	July 28, 1980
René Deustua Jameson	—	July 28, 1980	January 1, 1983
Luis Pércovich Roca	Acción Popular	January 1, 1983	April 20, 1983
Fortunato Quesada Lagarrigue	—N/a	April 20, 1983	December 29, 1983
Ismael Benavides Ferreyros	Acción Popular	December 29, 1983	July 28, 1985
José Palomino Roedel	—N/a	July 28, 1985	June 27, 1986
Javier Labarthe Correa	APRA	June 27, 1986	June 17, 1988
Rómulo León Alegría	APRA	June 17, 1988	May 15, 1989
Willy Harm Esparza	—	May 15, 1989	September 30, 1989
Juan Rebaza Carpio	—	September 30, 1989	July 28, 1990
Raúl Sánchez Sotomayor	—	July 28, 1990	January 8, 1991
Félix Canal Torres	—	January 8, 1991	June 22, 1991
Jaime Sobero Taira	—	June 22, 1991	April 3, 1996
Alberto Pandolfi Arbulú	—	April 3, 1996	July 18, 1997
Ludwig Meier Cornejo	—	July 18, 1997	October 13, 1999
César Luna-Victoria León	—	October 13, 1999	July 29, 2000
Pedro Arturo Handabaka García	—	July 29, 2000	November 22, 2000
Ludwig Meier Cornejo	—	November 22, 2000	July 28, 2001
Javier Reátegui Rosello	Perú Posible	July 28, 2001	July 12, 2002
Ministers of Industry (1992–2002)
See list
Ministers of Production
Eduardo Iriarte Jiménez	FIM	July 12, 2002	June 28, 2003
Javier Reátegui Roselló	Perú Posible	June 28, 2003	February 16, 2004
Alfonso Velásquez Tuesta	—	February 16, 2004	February 25, 2005
David Lemor Bezdin	—	February 25, 2005	July 28, 2006
Rafael Rey y Rey	Renovación Nacional	July 28, 2006	October 13, 2008
Elena Conterno Martinelli	—	October 14, 2008	July 10, 2009
Mercedes Aráoz Fernández	—	July 11, 2009	December 21, 2009
José Nicanor Gonzáles Quijano	—	December 22, 2009	September 13, 2010
Jorge Villasante Araníbar	APRA	September 14, 2010	May 13, 2011
Luis Nava Guibert	APRA	May 13, 2011	July 28, 2011
Kurt Burneo Farfán	—N/a	July 28, 2011	December 10, 2011
José Urquizo Maggia	PNP	December 11, 2011	May 13, 2012
Gladys Triveño Chanjan	—	May 14, 2012	February 24, 2014
Piero Ghezzi Solís	—	February 24, 2014	July 28, 2016
Bruno Giuffra Monteverde	—	July 28, 2016	May 25, 2017
Pedro Olaechea Álvarez-Calderón	PPK	May 25, 2017	January 9, 2018
Lieneke Schol Calle	—N/a	January 9, 2018	April 2, 2018
Daniel Córdova Cayo	PPK	April 2, 2018	April 25, 2018
Raúl Pérez-Reyes Espejo	—	April 30, 2018	March 10, 2019
Rocío Barrios Alvarado	—	March 11, 2019	July 15, 2020
José Salardi Rodríguez	—	July 15, 2020	November 10, 2020
Alfonso Miranda Eyzaguirre	—	November 12, 2020	November 17, 2020
José Luis Chicoma Lúcar	—	November 18, 2020	July 28, 2021
Yván Quispe Apaza	Frente Amplio	July 29, 2021	October 6, 2021
Rogger Incio Sánchez	Acción Popular	October 7, 2021	November 17, 2021
Jorge Luis Prado Palomino	—	November 17, 2021	November 25, 2022
Eduardo Mora Asnarán	—	November 25, 2022	December 7, 2022
Sandra Belaunde Arnillas	—	December 10, 2022	January 25, 2023
Raúl Pérez-Reyes Espejo	—	January 26, 2023	September 6, 2023
Ana María Choquehuanca Miranda	—	September 6, 2023	April 1, 2024
Sergio González Guerrero	—	April 1, 2024	October 12, 2025
César Quispe Luján		October 14, 2025	

=== Vice Ministers ===
- Vice Ministers of MSMEs and Industry (Vice Ministers of Industry from 1980 to 2008):
  - Iván Rivera Flores (1980–1983)
  - Jaime García Díaz (1993–1996)
  - Carlos Maza Rodríguez (2001–2002)
  - Carlos Zamorano Macchiavello (2002–2004)
  - Antonio Castillo Garay (2004–2006)
  - Jorge Alfredo Pancorvo Corcuera (2006–2007)
  - Carlos Reynaldo Ferraro Rey (2007–2008)
  - Carlos Reynaldo Ferraro Rey (2008–2009)
  - Edgar Auberto Quispe Remón (2009)
  - José Luis Chicoma Lúcar (2009–2010)
  - Hugo Rodríguez Espinoza (2010–2011)
  - Julio Guzmán Cáceres (2011)
  - Gladys Triveño Chanjan (2011–2012)
  - Magali Silva Velarde-Álvarez (2012–2013)
  - Francisco Grippa Zárate (2013–2014)
  - Sandra Doig Díaz (2014)
  - Carlos Gustavo Carrillo Mora (2014–2016)
  - Juan Carlos Mathews Salazar (2016–2017)
  - Marco Javier Velarde Bravo (2017–2018)
  - Javier Enrique Dávila Quevedo (2018–2019)
  - Óscar Miguel Graham Yamahuchi (2019)
  - José Salardi Rodríguez (2019–2020)
  - Wilson Paul Falen Lara (2020–present)
- Vice Ministers of Fisheries and Aquaculture (Vice Ministers of Fishing from 1983 to 2018):
  - Eduardo Falcone León (1983)
  - Emilio Rodríguez Larraín Salinas (1983–1985)
  - Nelson Cárdenas (1985–1986)
  - Agustín Ruiz Camero (1986–1988)
  - Ismael Prevost (1988–1989)
  - Jorge Vértiz (1989)
  - Enrique Sánchez (1989–1990)
  - Pedro Arturo Handabaka García (1995–2000)
  - Álvaro Valdéz Fernández Baca (2000–2001)
  - Julio Gregorio Gonzales Fernández (2001–2002)
  - Leoncio Álvarez Vásquez (2002–2004)
  - Alfonso Miranda Eyzaguirre (2004)
  - Alejandro Jiménez Morales (2004–2005)
  - Alfonso Miranda Eyzaguirre (2005–2009)
  - Elsa Galarza Contreras (2009–2010)
  - María Isabel Talledo Arana (2010–2011)
  - Rocío Barrios Alvarado (2011–2012)
  - Patricia Majluf Chiok (2012)
  - Eduardo Guillermo Emilio Pastor Rodríguez (2012)
  - Paul Phumpiu Chang (2012–2014)
  - Juan Carlos Requejo Alemán (2014–2016)
  - Héctor Soldi Soldi (2016–2018)
  - Javier Fernando Miguel Atkins Lerggios (2018–2019)
  - María del Carmen Abregú Báez (2019–2020)
  - Úrsula Desilú León Chempén (2020–present)

== See also ==
- Fishing in Peru
