= Pedro Olaechea =

Peruvian economist, vintner businessman and politician

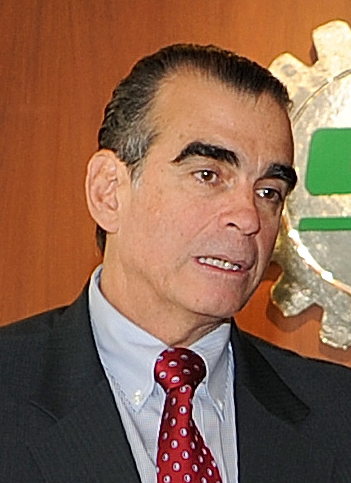

President of Congress
- In office July 27, 2019 – March 16, 2020 (Note: as President of the Permanent Assembly from September 30, 2019 to March 16, 2020.)
- Vice President: 1st Vice President; Karina Beteta; 2nd Vice President; Salvador Heresi; 3rd Vice President; Marvin Palma
- Preceded by: Daniel Salaverry
- Succeeded by: Manuel Merino

Minister of Production
- In office May 25, 2017 – January 9, 2018
- President: Pedro Pablo Kuczynski
- Prime Minister: Fernando Zavala; Mercedes Aráoz
- Preceded by: Bruno Giuffra
- Succeeded by: Lieneke Schol

Member of Congress
- In office July 26, 2016 – March 16, 2020
- Constituency: Lima

Personal details
- Born: Pedro Carlos Olaechea Álvarez-Calderón; January 6, 1954 (age 72) Lima, Peru
- Party: Independent
- Other political affiliations: Peruvians for Change (non affiliated); Republican Action (parliamentary caucus)
- Spouse: Ana María Diez Dibós
- Children: 4
- Education: Pontifical Catholic University of Peru (BA); Henley Management College (MBA)

Pedro Carlos Olaechea Álvarez-Calderón (born 6 January 1954) is a Peruvian economist, vintner businessman and politician, who is the former President of the Congress of the Republic of Peru. Olaechea had served in Congress from 2016 to 2019, elected for the Peruvians for Change, representing the constituency of Lima.

During the presidency of Pedro Pablo Kuczynski from 2017 to 2018, he served as Minister of Production.

In the aftermath of the 2019 Peruvian constitutional crisis (and in his position of last President of Congress), Olaechea served as President of the Congressional Permanent Assembly until 16 March 2020, the date in which the Congress-elect was sworn in.

== Biography ==
Son of lawyer Manuel Pablo Olaechea Du Bois and Ana María Álvarez-Calderón Fernandini. By paternal line he is grandson of Manuel Augusto Olaechea, lawyer and politician; and great-grandson of Manuel Pablo Olaechea, Prime Minister of Peru of Nicolás de Piérola. By maternal line he is the grandson of Anita Fernandini de Naranjo, first female mayor of Lima.

He studied at the Colegio de la Inmaculada and Colegio Santa María Marianistas. He has a bachelor's degree in Economics from Pontifical Catholic University of Peru. He also holds a Master of Business Administration (MBA) from the Henley Management College.

He has held management positions in the main trade union organizations in Peru, such as CONFIEP and the Association of Exporters (ADEX). He was President of the National Society of Industries from 2009 to 2012; Vice President of Business Solutions against Poverty (SEP), among other organizations.

In the private sector he has been Director of the Corporation of Development and Mineral Exploitation S.A. (CORDEMIN); Vice President of Lima Leasing; Executive Chairman of Comercializadora del Marañón (CODELMA), and Managing Director of Minera El Futuro de Ica. Also Director of Viña Tacama S.A.; and Chairman of the Board of Directors of Fábrica de Envases S.A. (FADESA).

He was Honorary Vice Consul of Denmark in Peru from 2004 to 2016.

=== Political career ===
==== Congressman ====
In 2016, Olaechea ran for Congress representing Lima under the Peruvians for Change parliamentary list, also serving as a part of the technical team for presidential nominee, Pedro Pablo Kuczynski. He ultimately was elected Congressman for the 2016-2021 term, obtaining a majority of 41,669 votes.

In Congress, he was appointed Vice Chairman of the Budget Committee. He is also a full member of the Defense Committee and heads the Special Multiparty Committee in charge of Legislative Planning (CEMOL). His good relationship with the Popular Force legislators, who make up the majority parliamentary group, has been highlighted.

In 2018, he quit the Peruvians for Change parliamentary group and founded the short-lived Concertación Parlamentaria group, proceeding to form the Republican Action group afterwards. He is considered one of the most conservative congressmen to date, due to his strong opposition to the "gender ideology" teachings in the national educational curriculum.

In 2019, he was elected to the Presidency of the Congress, defeating Daniel Salaverry's reelection ticket, receiving the support of the entire Popular Force party and numerous parliamentary groups of the opposition, although his ticket is composed of three Vice-Presidents from different factions.

==== Kuczynski administration ====
Olaechea was appointed Minister of Production on 25 May 2017, succeeding Bruno Giuffra who was transferred to the Ministry of Transport and Communications. Serving during the first phase of the 2017–19 Peruvian political crisis, his tenure ended with the recomposition of the Cabinet after the failed impeachment process against President Kuczynski and promise of instituting a "Reconciliation Cabinet", due to the controversial pardon of former president Alberto Fujimori.

==== Later career ====
Olaechea would sign the Madrid Charter, becoming a member of the Vox-organized international alliance of right-wing and far-right individuals.

== Recognitions ==
- Honor Merit of the Association of Submarinists of Peru
- Industrial Merit Medal of the National Society of Industries
- Honorary Order Alejandro Tabini of the National Industrial Labor Training Service (SENATI)
