= José Luis Chicoma =

Peruvian economist and politician

Ministry of Production
- In office 18 November 2020 – 28 July 2021
- Preceded by: Alfonso Miranda Eyzaguirre
- Succeeded by: Yván Quispe Apaza

Personal details
- Born: 31 March 1976 (age 50)
- Education: Universidad del Pacífico (MA); Harvard Kennedy School (MPP)

José Luis Chicoma (born March 31, 1976) is a Peruvian government minister. He was the Ministry of Production, serving from 2020 to 2021.
