= Zulema Tomás =

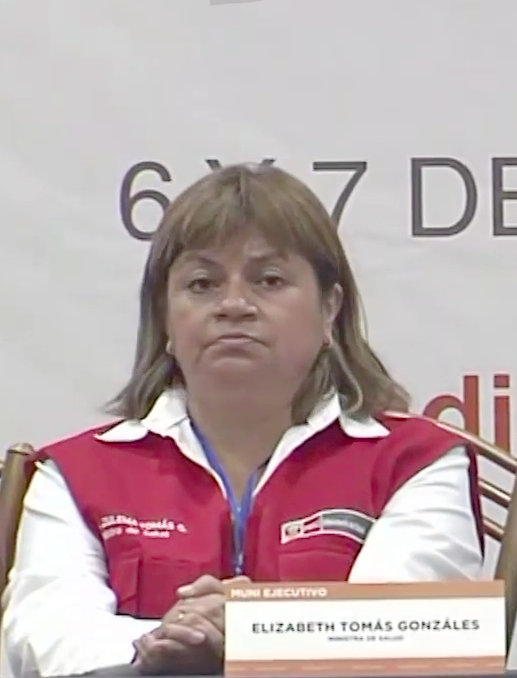

Minister of Health of Peru
- In office 7 January 2019 – 15 November 2019
- President: Martín Vizcarra
- Prime Minister: César Villanueva; Salvador del Solar; Vicente Zeballos
- Preceded by: Silvia Pessah
- Succeeded by: Elizabeth Hinostroza

Personal details
- Born: Elizabeth Zulema Tomás Gonzales; 4 July 1962 (age 63) Lima, Peru
- Education: Federico Villarreal National University; Hermilio Valdizán National University
- Occupation: Physician, educator

Elizabeth Zulema Tomás Gonzales (born 4 July 1962) is a Peruvian cardiovascular anaesthesiologist. She served as the country's Minister of Health from 7 January to 15 November 2019.

== Early years ==
Zulema Tomás was born in Lima on 4 July 1962, the daughter of a member of the National Police of Peru. She attended Alipio Ponce School in Barrios Altos for her primary and secondary education.

She is a cardiovascular anesthesiologist by profession from the Federico Villarreal National University (UNFV). She holds a doctorate in medicine and a master's in health administration and hospital management from the same university. She also has a master's degree in education, and a mention in research and higher teaching from the Hermilio Valdizán National University (UNHEVAL).

She has taught at UNFV and at the Faculty of Human Medicine of Ricardo Palma University (URP).

== Professional career ==
=== Work experience ===
Tomás was general director of the National Institute of Children's Health (INSN) of Breña from June 2014 to March 2015, and CEO of San Borja's INSN from April 2015 to January 2019.

In 2017, she led the regional nutritional program "Como en Casa", which was nominated for a Best Practices in Public Management award in the Maternal and Child Nutrition category.

She has also been a member of the Body of Public Managers of the National Civil Service Authority (SERVIR).

=== Minister of Health ===
On 7 January 2019, Tomás was sworn in as Minister of Health during the government of Martín Vizcarra, replacing Silvia Pessah, who had resigned due to personal problems.

On 23 February 2019, the government published the Supreme Decree approving the law that regulates the medicinal and therapeutic use of cannabis and its derivatives (No. 30681), establishing the objective of guaranteeing the fundamental right to health and allowing access, exclusively for medicinal and therapeutic use.

On 17 April 2019, after former President Alan García shot himself in the temple and was transferred to Casimiro Ulloa Hospital, a medical team led by Tomás took over his care, diagnosing a bullet impact, entry, and exit in the head, and later giving details of his death after suffering a brain injury.

On 15 June 2019, the government published the modification of the Regulation of Law No. 30021 on the Promotion of Healthy Eating for Children and Adolescents, a rule that established the use of front labeling in all processed and ultra-processed products that are high in sugar, sodium, saturated fat, and those that contain trans fat. By means of Supreme Decree No. 015-2019-SA, published in the official newspaper El Peruano, octagon-shaped labels were made compulsory in order to provide health information to all citizens. This took effect 17 June 2020.

On 3 September 2019, Tomás was called to testify before the Congressional Health Commission regarding the scarce provisioning of incubators in the Regional Hospital of Lambayeque and Honorio Delgado Hospital in Arequipa, where 30 and 63 newborn babies had recently died, respectively. Similar complaints were made in Huancayo, Cusco, and Trujillo. In an interview with the press, the minister confirmed the death of 1,200 babies throughout the year, and her willingness to give the corresponding explanations to Congress.

On 15 October 2019, the University Community Mental Health Center (CSMC) at the National University of San Marcos was inaugurated, with the objective of providing mental health care services to more than 50,000 students and 10,000 teachers.

On 30 October 2019, the government announced the promulgation of Emergency Decree (DU) No. 007-2019, which allowed the population to access affordable generic drugs, biological products, and medical devices at public and private drug stores and pharmacies.

=== Resignation after allegations of nepotism ===
On 15 November 2019, Tomás resigned after serious allegations of nepotism in the hiring of her husband by the National Superintendency of Public Registries (SUNARP), and failing to declare on her CV that her sister, Edith Tomás, had worked at the Potable Water and Sewerage Service of Lima (SEDAPAL) for four years.

On 17 November 2019, the journalistic program Panorama revealed that Tomás had hired Luz Parra Galván, the mother of her son's partner, as head of teaching and research at the María Auxiliadora hospital through a ministerial resolution. It was also announced that when Tomás took office, the woman's father, Mariano Alarcon Guevara, who also worked at the Maria Auxiliadora hospital, was given a 15-day suspension rather than a dismissal he had incurred for misconduct under the previous management.

=== Post resignation ===
On 30 January 2020, Tomás was hired as an advisor to the General Directorate of the National Children's Institute. On 28 March, her daughter Fiorella Palomino confirmed that Tomás had tested positive for COVID-19 while working during the pandemic.
