= Gladys Triveño =

Peruvian lawyer and politician

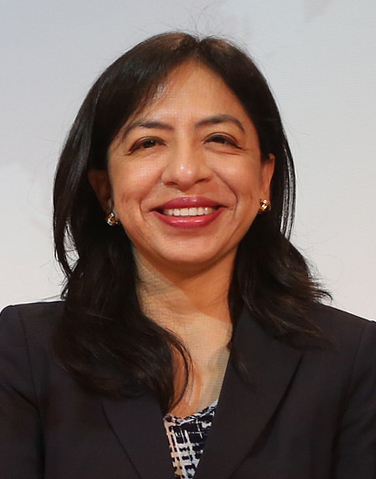

Minister of Production
- In office 14 May 2012 – 24 February 2014
- Preceded by: José Antonio Urquizo
- Succeeded by: Piero Ghezzi

Personal details
- Born: 19 March 1967 (age 58)

Gladys Mónica Triveño Chan Jan (born 19 March 1967) is a Peruvian lawyer. She was Minister of Production, from 14 May 2012 until 24 February 2014.

== Biography ==
She graduated of lawyer in the Pontificia Catholic University of the Peru (PUCP) in 1994 with a master's in Administration of Companies by the School of Businesses (ESDEN) in Madrid, Spain. She also has a degree in Strategic Direction of Finances by the University of the Pacific.

She has been general manager of the Association of Exporters of the Peru (ADEX), director and manager of Institutional Development of INDECOPI. In addition she was a consultant of the Program of the United Nations for the Development (PNUD) and of the Ministry of Economy and Finances.

In 2003 she founded Proexpansión S.R.L., a company of consulting and of investigation oriented to promote the growth of the micro, small and medium enterprises of her country (Mypes).

Further she has exercised as the chair of the PUCP.

In March 2012, the government of President Ollanta Humala designated her as vice-minister of MYPE and as Industry of the Minister of Production. She then assumed the challenge to design a politics of State in favor of the Mypes to promote growth.

== Minister of the Production ==
On 14 May 2012, she was sworn in as Minister of Production in front of the President Humala, in a ceremony made in the Golden Living room of Palace of Government. She replaced José Urquizo Maggia as he gained a title in Defense. In the same ceremony she swore to Wilver Street Girón as titling of the dispatch of the Interior.
