= Guillermo Aliaga =

Peruvian politician

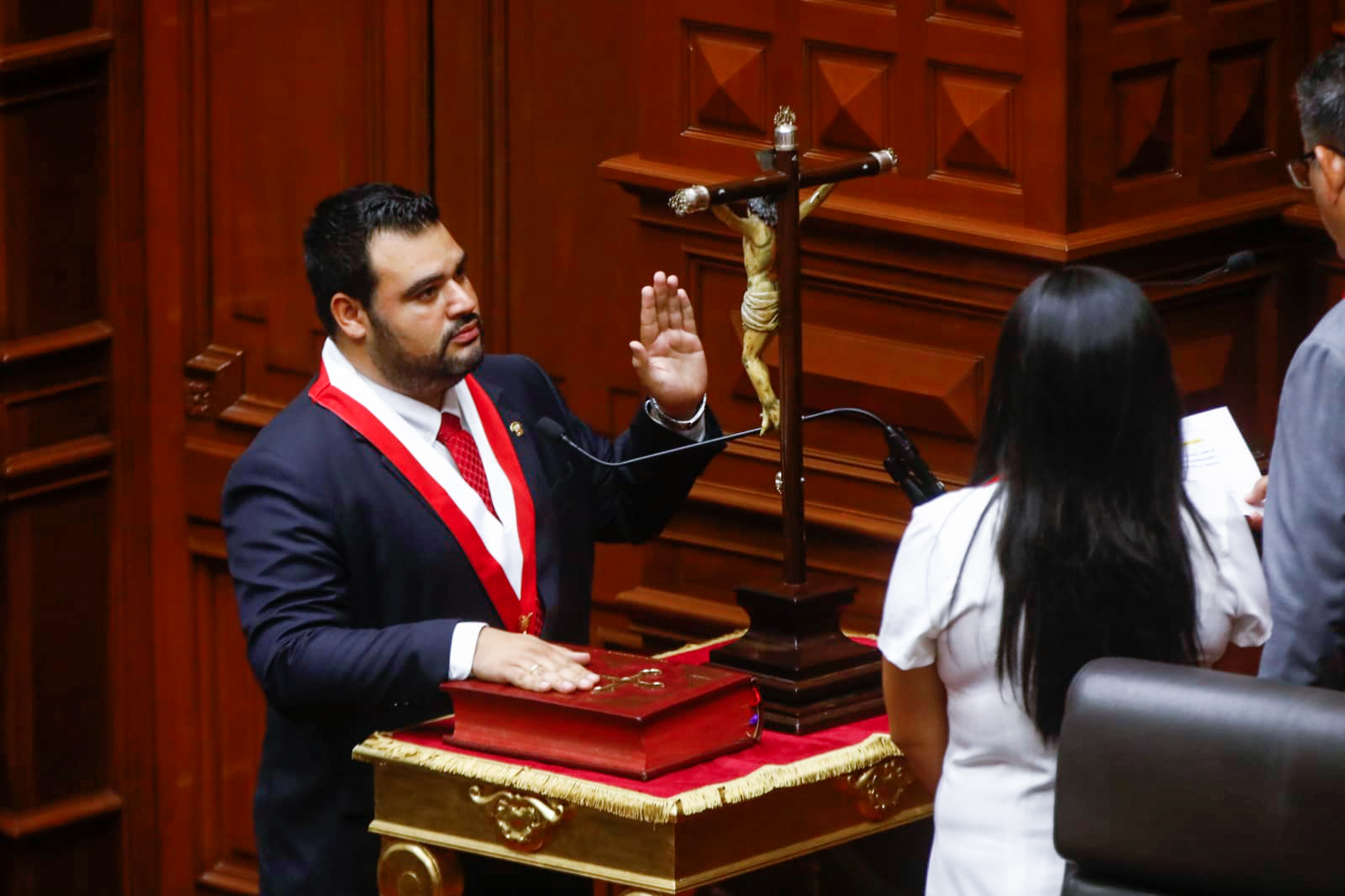

Second Vice President of Congress
- In office 16 March 2020 – 15 November 2020
- President: Manuel Merino
- Preceded by: Salvador Heresi
- Succeeded by: Mirtha Vásquez (acting)

Member of Congress
- In office March 16, 2020 – July 26, 2021
- Constituency: Lima

Personal details
- Born: 28 October 1986 (age 39) Lima, Peru
- Party: We Are Peru (2017–present)
- Education: University of Lima (LLB); National University of San Marcos
- Occupation: Politician
- Profession: Lawyer

Guillermo Antonio Alejandro Aliaga Pajares (born 28 October 1986) is a Peruvian politician. He is a Congressman representing Lima for the 2020–2021 complementary term, and belongs to the We Are Peru party. He was Second Vice President of Congress from March 16, 2020, to November 15, 2020, when he resigned in midst of the 2020 protests.

== Biography ==
=== Early life ===
He was born in the district of San Isidro on October 28, 1986.

He completed his school studies at the San Agustín School in the city of Lima, in which he was president of the Centennial Promotion and a pre-selected athlete by the Peruvian Basketball Federation. The sport allowed him to obtain a scholarship to study law at the University of Lima.

He studied law at the University of Lima, from which he obtained a law degree. After that, he studied a master's degree in Business Law at the University of Lima (2011-2013). In 2015, he began his doctorate studies in law at the Universidad Nacional Mayor de San Marcos.

In 2009, he won a 4-month international scholarship from the Japanese government for the United Nations-sponsored program The Ship for World Youth Leaders (SWYL 2009). After graduating from this program he was part of the Ship For World Youth Alumni Association (SWYAA), as a speaker at the annual conventions in Egypt and Australia.

== Political career ==
=== Congressman ===
In the extraordinary parliamentary elections of 2020, he ran for a seat in Congress for the Democratic Party “We Are Peru’ representing Lima and, he was elected for the 2020-2021 period.

He was elected Second Vice President of the board of directors in the Congress of the Republic for the period 2020 to 2021. As such, he is a member of the Permanent Commission.

During the second presidential vacancy process against Martín Vizcarra, Aliaga voted in favor of the declaration of moral incapacity for Martín Vizcarra. The vacancy was approved by 105 MPs on November 9, 2020.

Due to the political crisis in the country, he resigned as a member of the board of directors of the Congress of the Republic on November 15, 2020. He is currently the spokesperson for the We are Peru Democratic Party bench.
