= Liberal Bench =

Political group in Peru

Liberal Bench Bancada Liberal
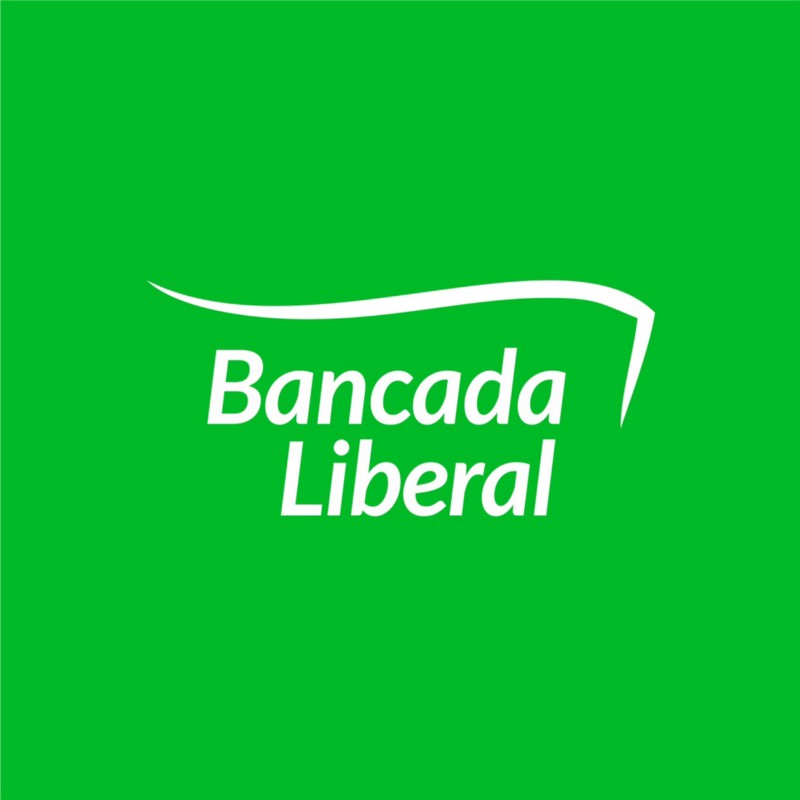
- Spokesperson: Gino Costa
- Deputy Spokesperson: Alberto de Belaúnde
- Founded: 19 December 2018
- Dissolved: 16 March 2020
- Headquarters: Lima, Peru
- Ideology: Liberalism; Progressivism
- Political position: Centre
- Colors: Green

Liberal Bench (Spanish: Bancada Liberal) was a Peruvian parliamentary caucus formed by Francesco Petrozzi during the 2016–2019 term of the Peruvian Congress. The group was introduced on December 19, 2018, by congressman Alberto de Belaúnde and was formally recognized that same day by President of Congress Daniel Salaverry. Its members are former members of the political parties Peruvians for Change and Popular Force.

The caucus was formally dissolved in the aftermath of the constitutional dissolution of the Peruvian Congress issued by President Martín Vizcarra on 30 September 2019, leading to the Permanent Assembly where the caucus was represented by congressman Gino Costa only. Costa and Alberto de Belaúnde were reelected to complete their term at the 2020 parliamentary election held on 26 January 2020, as invited candidates of the Purple Party.

== History ==
On December 19, 2018, independent congressman Gino Costa announced the creation of Liberal Bench to other independent congressmen. He later announced himself as the spokesperson of the group.

== Congressional makeup ==
Its official members are four former members of Peruvians for a Change: Gino Costa, Alberto de Belaunde, Vincente Zeballos, Guido Lombardi. Additionally, it consists of one former member of Popular Force, Francesco Petrozzi. On December 5, 2019, de Belaunde announced that the party is open to including new members.
