= Patricia Majluf =

Peruvian biologist and environmentalist

- Born: María Patricia Yamile Majluf Chiok; May 12, 1958 (age 68)
- Education: Cayetano Heredia University (B.S. in Biology) Cayetano Heredia University (Degree in Marine Biology) Cambridge University (Ph.D. in Zoology)
- Occupations: Biologist, environmentalist, and researcher
- Awards: Guggenheim Fellowship Whitley Gold Award Pew Fellowship in Marine Conservation Medal for Merits and Services from the Cayetano Heredia University

Patricia Majluf Chiok is a Peruvian biologist, zoologist, researcher and conservationist. She founded the Center for Environmental Sustainability (CSA) at the Cayetano Heredia University in 2006. She is currently the Vice President in Peru of Oceana, a non-profit organization dedicated to the protection of the oceans.

She briefly held the position of Vice Minister of Fisheries during the Government of Ollanta Humala, being appointed on February 25, 2012. A few months later, on May 3, 2012, she submitted her irrevocable resignation from his position due to his "discrepancy and dissatisfaction about the management of the fishing sector" under the charge of the then Minister of Production José Urquizo Maggia.

== Biography ==
Majluf obtained her Bachelor of Science degree in 1980 and a degree in Marine Biology in 1981 from the Cayetano Heredia University, and her Ph.D. in Zoology at the University of Cambridge in 1988.

Since 1982, she has led the longest-running research program off the coast of Peru, studying the impacts of El Niño and fisheries on marine wildlife populations. Since 1996 she has led marine conservation efforts in Peru, promoting the establishment of marine protected areas and developing public awareness of the large-scale ecosystem and socioeconomic impacts of industrial fisheries for Peruvian anchoveta (Engraulis ringens) and other extractive industries in the upwelling system of the Humboldt Current.

In 2006 she promoted Anchoveta Week seeking to promote the national consumption of this species and make its ecological role visible in the ecosystem of the Humboldt Current. The campaign, in partnership with Peruvian chefs and restaurants, achieved an increase in human consumption from 10,000 tons in 2006 to 190,000 tons in 2012. The Center for Environmental Sustainability (CSA), an institution directed by Majluf, received in 2012 from the BBVA Foundation one of the awards for the conservation of biodiversity, an award that recognizes efforts to conserve biodiversity in Latin America.

In 2012 she was awarded the Pew Fellowship in Marine Conservation to implement a project whose objective was to reduce the industrial fishing of anchovy for the production of fishmeal and fish oil, seeking to increase direct human consumption.

== Awards and recognition ==
- 2006. Whitley Gold Award for Coastal and Marine Conservation.
- 2007. Guggenheim Fellowship.
- 2012. Pew Fellowship in Marine Conservation, awarded by the Pew Environment Group in Washington D. C.
- 2013. Medal for Merits and Services from the Cayetano Heredia University.
