= Elsa Patricia Galarza Contreras =

Peruvian economist

Elsa Galarza
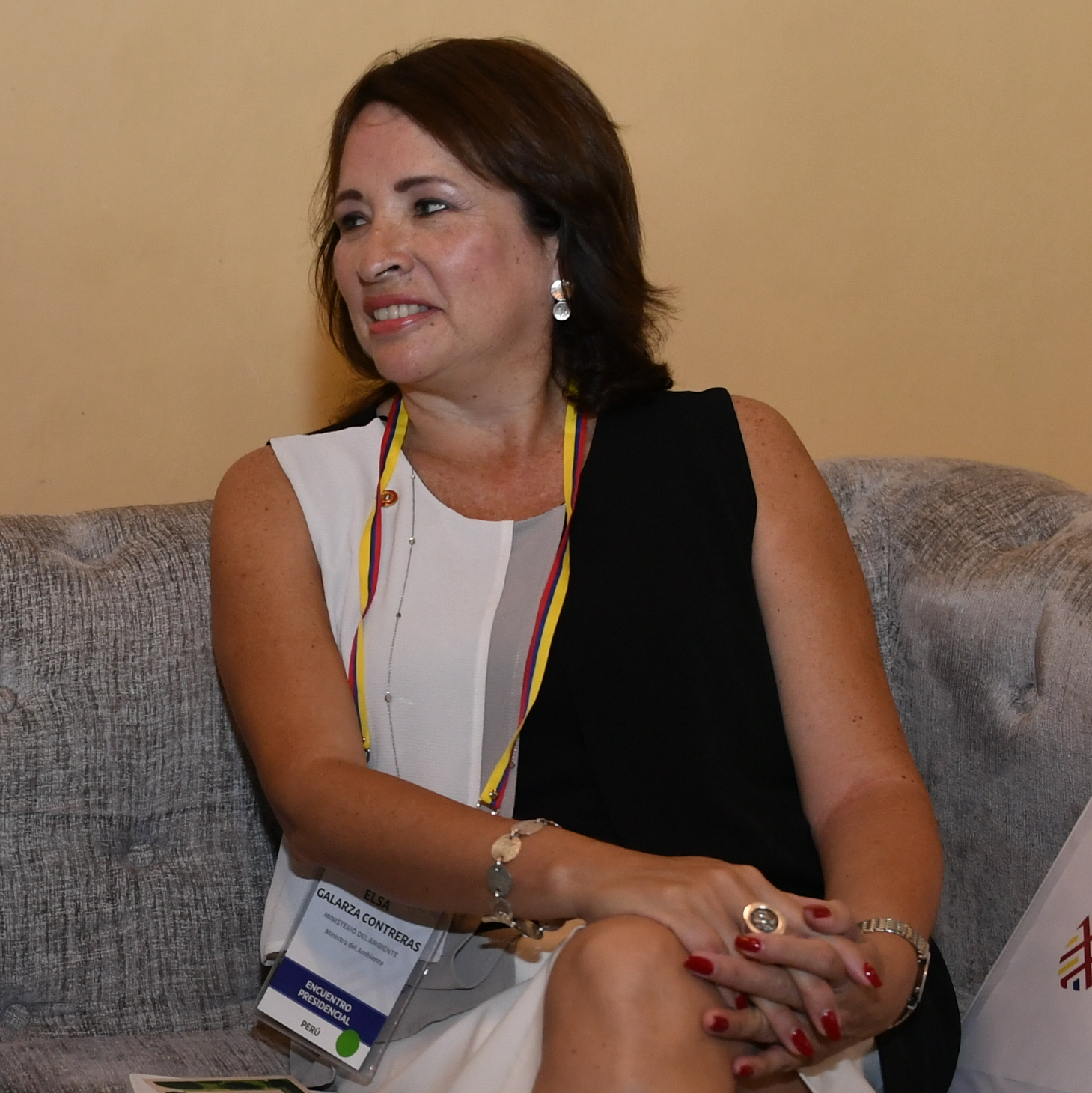
- Elsa Galarza in 2018

Minister of Environment
- In office 28 July 2016 – 2 April 2018
- President: Pedro Pablo Kuczynski
- Prime Minister: Fernando Zavala; Mercedes Aráoz
- Preceded by: Manuel Pulgar-Vidal
- Succeeded by: Fabiola Martha Muñoz Dodero

Personal details
- Born: 12 August 1963 (age 63) Lima
- Education: University of the Pacific; Iowa State University
- Occupation: Economist

Elsa Patricia Galarza Contreras (born 12 August 1963) is a Peruvian economist. She had been the Minister of the Environment from 28 July 2016 to 2 April 2018.

== Biography ==
Galarza holds a bachelor's degree in economics from the University of the Pacific in Lima and a master's degree, also in economics, from Iowa State University. She was the Deputy Ministry of Fisheries within the Peruvian Ministry of Production during the second term of Alan García as President of Peru, adviser to the ministerial office of the Ministry of Economy and Finance, and a member of the Multisectorial Group charged with the creation of the Ministry of Environment. She has also been a consultant for the World Bank, the Inter-American Development Bank, the Food and Agriculture Organization of the United Nations, and CAF – Development Bank of Latin America and the Caribbean, among others.

As a teacher, Galarza has been a professor at the Academic Department of Economics for the University of the Pacific in Lima and the director of the same university's economics research center.

=== Minister of Environment ===
On 15 July 2016, President Pedro Pablo Kuczynski appointed Galarzaas the Minister of Environment, making her the first woman to hold the position.
