= José Antonio Urquizo =

Peruvian politician

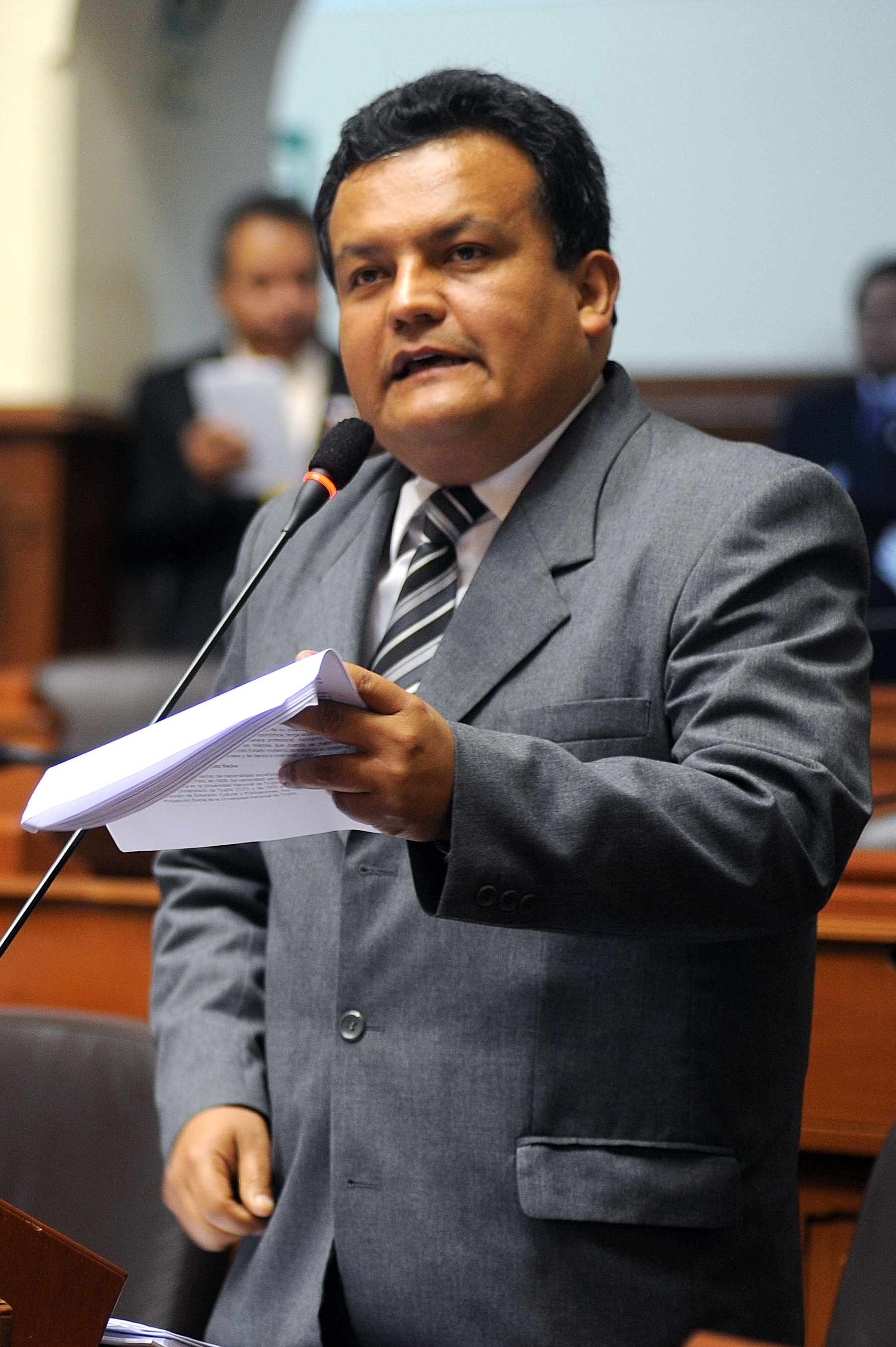

Minister of Defense
- In office May 14, 2012 – July 23, 2012
- President: Ollanta Humala
- Prime Minister: Óscar Valdés
- Preceded by: Luis Alberto Otárola
- Succeeded by: Pedro Cateriano

Minister of Production
- In office December 11, 2011 – May 14, 2012
- President: Ollanta Humala
- Prime Minister: Óscar Valdés
- Preceded by: Kurt Burneo
- Succeeded by: Gladys Triveño

Member of Congress
- In office July 26, 2006 – July 26, 2016
- Constituency: Ayacucho

1st Lieutenant Governor of Ayacucho
- In office January 1, 2003 – July 26, 2006
- Governor: Omar Quesada
- Preceded by: Office created
- Succeeded by: Rubén Quispe Bedriñana

Personal details
- Born: José Antonio Urquizo Maggia; February 13, 1967 (age 59) Ayacucho, Ayacucho, Peru
- Party: Ayacucho Wins (2017-present)
- Other political affiliations: Peruvian Nationalist Party (2006-2016); Peruvian Aprista Party (2003-2006)
- Education: Federico Villarreal National University (LLB)

José Antonio Urquizo Maggia (born February 13, 1967) is a Peruvian politician (PNP). He served as a Congressman representing Ayacucho from 2006 to 2016.

== Education ==
From 1984 to 1989, José Antonio Urquizo studied cooperativism and university teaching at the Universidad Nacional Federico Villarreal (UNFV) in Lima, which he concluded with a master's degree. Since 1991, he has been a lecturer at his alma mater. From 1995 to 1995, he led a higher technological institute in Ayacucho. From 1999 to 2000, he took a specialization course in administration at the UNFV.

== Political career ==
=== Early political career ===
In the 2002 regional elections, Urquizo was elected vice governor of the Ayacucho Region, for a four-year term, under the social-democratic Peruvian Aprista Party.

=== Congressional career ===
In the 2006 elections, he was elected to the Congress to represent his home region, on the joint Peruvian Nationalist Party-Union for Peru list. After the split of the alliance, he sat on the Nationalist bench. In the 2011 elections, he was re-elected on the Peru Wins list. In December 2011, after Salomón Lerner resigned as Prime Minister of Peru, Ollanta Humala appointed him as Minister of Production. Afterwards in 2012 he briefly served as Minister of Defense after the resignation of Luis Alberto Otárola and was replaced by Pedro Cateriano in July 2012.

=== Post-congressional career ===
In the 2018 regional elections, he ran for Governor of Ayacucho, but lost, placing third.
