= Silvia Pessah =

Peruvian surgeon and politician

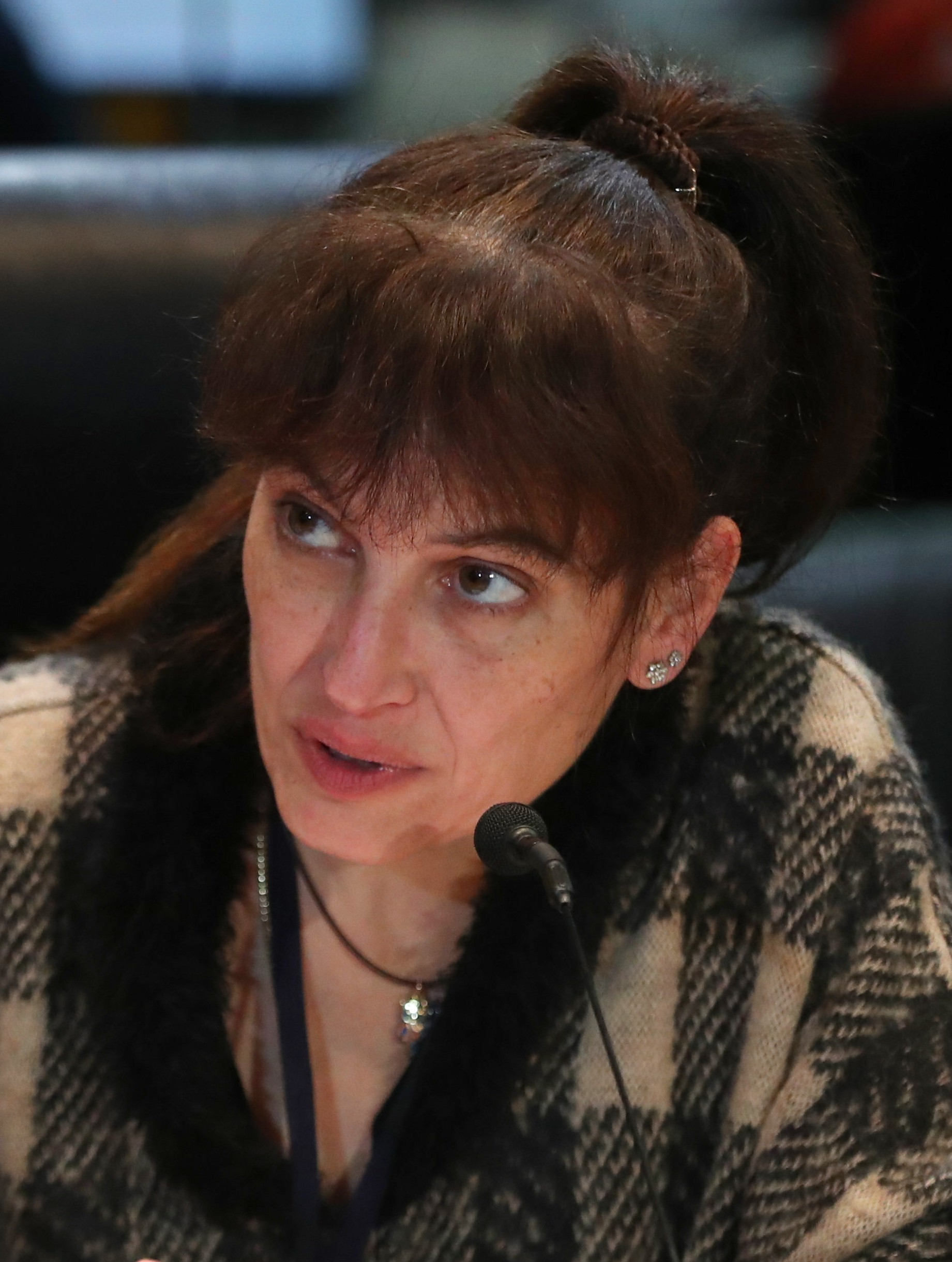

Minister of Health of Peru
- In office 2 April 2018 – 5 January 2019
- President: Martín Vizcarra
- Prime Minister: César Villanueva
- Preceded by: Abel Salinas Rivas
- Succeeded by: Zulema Tomás

Vice Minister of Public Health
- In office 27 August 2016 – 19 September 2017
- President: Pedro Pablo Kuczynski

Personal details
- Born: Silvia Ester Pessah Eljay; 9 August 1967 (age 58) Lima, Peru
- Education: National University of La Plata; Cayetano Heredia University
- Occupation: Surgeon

Silvia Ester Pessah Eljay (born 9 August 1967) is a Peruvian surgeon. She served as the country's Minister of Health from 2 April 2018 to 5 January 2019, in the government of Martín Vizcarra.

== Biography ==
Silvia Pessah was born on 9 August 1967, the daughter of Alberto Pessah Azar and Julia Eljay Levy, both practising Jews.

She attended the Colegio León Pinelo in Lima before studying medicine at the National University of La Plata, Argentina, where she obtained her professional title in 1992. She graduated from the Master of Public Health program at the Cayetano Heredia University, Peru in 1999, and the Master in Biomedicine and Health Computer Science program at the University of Washington.

== Career ==
In 1992, Pessah started working at the National Institute of Neoplastic Diseases, where she was an attending physician until 1995.

From 2005 to 2006, she was director of the Sexual Rights and Citizenship in Health program at the Flora Tristán Peruvian Women's Center. From 2006 to 2009, she was director of the epidemiology office of the Cayetano Heredia National Hospital. From 2007 to 2009, she was also head of Peru's National Institute of Health.

She worked at the Israeli Ministry of Health from 2011 to 2013, where she was a researcher and responsible for the implementation of the National Law on Hospital Quality Assurance. She was National Director of Zoonotic Diseases from 2013 to 2016, as well as head of the Adverse Reactions to Vaccines area.

In the academic field, she has served as an associate professor at Cayetano Heredia University.

== Public office ==
On 27 August 2016, Pessah was appointed Vice Minister of Public Health in the government of Pedro Pablo Kuczynski. She remained in office until 19 September 2017.

From 2017 to 2018 she was an advisor at the Ministry of Women and Vulnerable Populations.

=== Minister of Health ===
On 2 April 2018, Pessah was sworn in as Peru's Minister of Health, in the first cabinet of President Martín Vizcarra.

She presented her resignation to Prime Minister César Villanueva on 2 January 2019 due to "personal reasons".

== Selected publications ==
- Servicios interculturales para la mujer, de la teoría a la práctica (2005)
- Action of the bothropic polivalent antivenom against proteolitic proteins of the Peruvian snake ́s venom (2008)
- Multicentric study. Women's health and domestic violence. Peruvian results (2008), coauthor
- Rabies situation in Israel in the period 2000–2014 (2015), coauthor
- Sexual transmitted disease in Israel in the period 2000–2014 (2015), coauthor
- National guideline of brucellosis in Israel (2016), coauthor
