= Julián Pérez Huarancca =

Peruvian writer

Julián Pérez Huarancca (born 1954, Ayacucho) is a Peruvian novelist.

== Education ==
He attended La Cantuta University in Lima from 1991 to 1994, earning a B.A. in literature and language.

== Career ==
Then he worked as a professor at the San Cristóbal of Huamanga University in his hometown of Ayacucho. After receiving a Ph.D. in Peruvian and Latin American literature from the National University of San Marcos, he began to work at Federico Villarreal National University in 1998. Julián Pérez is notable for themes of the Andes, writing about Ayacucho, and for his stark depictions of violence and introspective narratives.

== Family ==
He is the brother of the writer Hildebrando Pérez Huarancca. His daughter is Paola Perez

== Novels ==
- Transeúntes (1988)
- Tikanka (1989)
- Fuego y ocaso (1998)
- Papel de viento (2000)
- Retablo (2004)
- El fantasma que te Desgarra (2008)
- Piel de utopía y otros cuentos (2011)
- Resto que no cesa de insistir (2011)
- Criba (2013)
- Anamorfosis (2017)

== Awards ==
- "Julian Ramón Ribeyro" Short Novel Competition (2017) for Anamórfosis
- Federico Villarreal National Award (2003) for Retablo
- Premio Copé (2013) for Criba
