= Federico Villarreal =

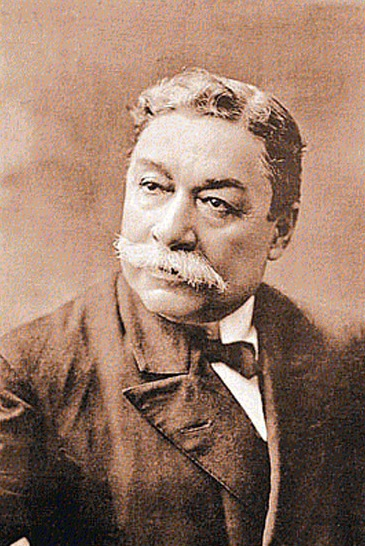
- Born: Federico Villarreal Villarreal; August 31, 1850; Lambayeque, Peru
- Died: June 3, 1923; Lima, Peru
- Known for: Villarreal polynomial

Federico Villarreal Villarreal (* Lambayeque, 1850 - † Lima, 1923) was a Peruvian scientist, engineer and politician.

== Biography ==
=== Early years ===
Federico Villarreal was born August 31, 1850, in Túcume, Lambayeque. His parents were Ruperto Villarreal, and Manuela Villarreal.

== Studies ==
He focused his studies there on mathematics, physics and engineering. He continued his studies in National University of San Marcos and former Escuela de Ingenieros, now National University of Engineering.

== Death ==
Villarreal died in Lima on June 3, 1923.
