= Julian Perez (DJ) =

Spanish DJ and electronic music producer

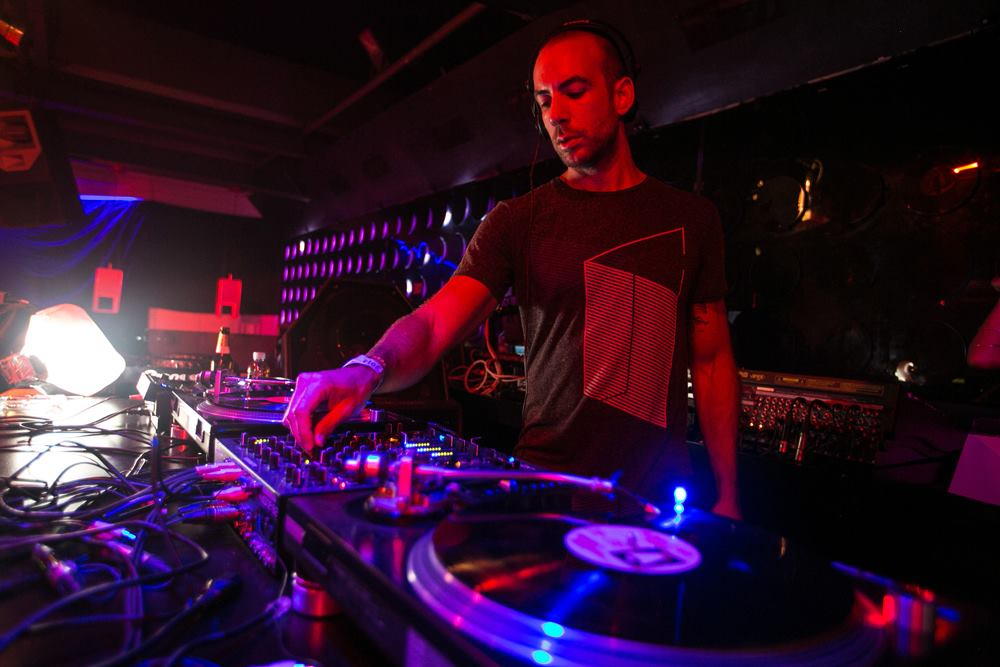

Background information
- Born: May 20, 1982 (age 44); Valencia, Spain
- Origin: Ibiza, Spain
- Genres: Techno; House; Minimal techno; Dub techno
- Occupations: DJ; record producer; record label founder; author
- Years active: 2006–present
- Labels: Fathers & Sons Productions; Girada Unlimited; Cocoon Recordings; Raum...musik; VIVa Music; Recycle Records; Rawax; Subwax Bcn
- Website: julianperez.com

Julian Perez (born 20 May 1982 in Valencia) is a Spanish DJ and electronic music producer based in Ibiza, Spain. He is the founder of two vinyl-only record labels, Fathers & Sons Productions (2012) and Girada Unlimited (2017), and has released music on Cocoon Recordings, Raum...musik, Recycle Records, Rawax and Subwax Bcn, among others. Perez was named one of the Ibiza season's breakthrough talents by Mixmag in 2014 and holds a summer residency at Underground Ibiza. He has performed at venues including Rex Club in Paris, Fabric in London, and Robert Johnson in Offenbach am Main, and at festivals including the Amsterdam Dance Event, BPM Festival, and Sunwaves Festival. He released his debut studio album, Solemnity, in 2016; his second album, Break-Even, in 2021; and his third album, A Journey Through The Beatscape, in 2024. In 2026 he published his debut book, INTERFASE: The Infinite Set.

== Career ==
=== Early career ===
Julian Perez developed his connection with electronic music in the early 1990s, influenced by the house, techno, EBM and New Beat scenes emerging from the United States, the United Kingdom and northern Europe. In an interview with XLR8R, he recalled listening as a child to cassette tapes recorded at Valencia clubs including Barraca, Chocolate, Spook Factory and ACTV — key venues of the circuit known as La Ruta del Bakalao — and described that scene as a formative influence.

From approximately 2000 to 2005, Perez worked in advertising and graphic design in Alicante, Spain, while also performing as a DJ at clubs and events. In 2006 he relocated to Ibiza, where he began performing at after-parties and smaller venues on the island, eventually focusing on music production full-time. His first releases appeared around 2010, with appearances on compilations from labels including Leftroom and Be As One Imprint.

=== Fathers & Sons Productions (2012–present) ===
In 2012, Perez founded Fathers & Sons Productions, a vinyl-only record label based in Ibiza, and during this period also lived in Berlin until 2013. The label, described by Resident Advisor as known for "subtle, dubby house" music, released twelve records over four years, featuring artists including S.A.M., Livio & Roby, and Brian Harden. According to DJ Mag ES, within its first year of operation the label organised showcases in more than twelve countries. During this period, Perez also released material on Steve Lawler's VIVa Music imprint, appeared on the Cocoon Compilation N (2014) and Zehn (2015) compilations on Cocoon Recordings, and was involved in the tINI and the Gang touring collective.

According to Mixmag, his sound combined elements from Detroit and Chicago with a European dub techno sensibility, "a recipe that's won him support from the likes of Ricardo Villalobos, Loco Dice, Apollonia and The Martinez Brothers."

A key release was FAS003 (2012), which included his remix of "The Night Train", originally by Kadoc. DJ Mag Latinoamérica noted that the remix "hit hard in every club in Ibiza" during the summer of 2012. According to an interview in Vicious Magazine, the very same afternoon Perez produced the remix, Loco Dice played it live at Amnesia Ibiza. The remix was later selected for the Vagabundos 2013 and Vagabundos 2013 Part 2 compilations on Cadenza, the label co-founded by Luciano and Ricardo Villalobos.

In 2016, Perez made his debut on the Berlin-based Raum...musik imprint with the Now, After EP, described by Resident Advisor as "versatile material suitable for late-set club play."

Fathers & Sons Productions initially closed in late 2016 with the release of Perez's debut album, Solemnity (FAS012), a double LP spanning eleven tracks across four vinyl sides. XLR8R described the album as featuring "floating soundscapes, electro-tinged 909 beats, spaced-out club weapons, and deep, dub techno."

The label was reactivated in 2023 with FAS012+1, followed by FAS014 in 2025, both released by Perez.

=== Girada Unlimited (2017–present) ===
In 2017, Perez founded Girada Unlimited, a second vinyl-only label. The label was highlighted by XLR8R for its release on Cure Music, whose A-side "Zapatac" had become a regular in Ricardo Villalobos's sets and was featured in his BBC Radio 1 Essential Mix. The label has hosted releases by artists including Franco Cinelli and D&S. Its tenth release was Perez's second studio album, Break-Even (2021). In 2024 he released his third album, A Journey Through The Beatscape (GIRADATAPES01), on cassette.

=== International career and recognition ===
Perez has performed at clubs including Rex Club in Paris, Fabric in London, Womb in Tokyo, and Robert Johnson in Offenbach am Main. In Ibiza he is a regular resident at Underground Ibiza and has performed at events including ENTER. at Space Ibiza and Cocoon Ibiza.

He has performed at festivals including the Amsterdam Dance Event, the Sunwaves Festival, the Epizode Festival in Vietnam, the BPM Festival, the Outline Festival in Moscow, the Sophie Festival in Málaga, off-Sónar parties in Barcelona, the Kazantip Festival, and the Winter Music Conference.

He has been interviewed and profiled in publications including Resident Advisor, DJ Mag ES, Vicious Magazine, Ibiza Voice Magazine and Pulse Radio, among others. He was nominated for Best Artist at the Vicious Music Awards in 2012 and 2013, and for Best Newcomer at the DJ Awards in 2016.

=== INTERFASE: The Infinite Set (2026) ===
In 2026, Perez published INTERFASE: The Infinite Set, his first book, released in English and Spanish. The work explores the ideas and experiences that shaped his career as a DJ and offers a perspective on his creative process in electronic music.

== Discography ==
=== Albums ===
Title	Year	Label	Notes
Solemnity	2016	Fathers & Sons Productions	Double LP; FAS012
Break-Even	2021	Girada Unlimited	GIRADA010
A Journey Through The Beatscape	2024	Girada Unlimited	Cassette; GIRADATAPES01

=== Selected EPs ===
Title	Year	Label
Nelipot EP	2010	Recycle Records
Lights Down EP	2010	Lowpitch
Troops In The Hood	2011	Lowpitch
Deep Craziness EP	2012	Recycle Records
Prominently EP	2012	VIVa MUSiC Limited
FAS001	2012	Fathers & Sons Productions
FAS003	2012	Fathers & Sons Productions
Royal Token EP	2013	Recycle Records
The Corridor EP	2013	Act Natural Records
FAS007.1	2013	Fathers & Sons Productions
Unknown Source	2014	Drumma
FAS008	2014	Fathers & Sons Productions
FAS009 (as ROSS 248)	2015	Fathers & Sons Productions
FAS010	2015	Fathers & Sons Productions
Now, After	2016	Raum...musik
Girada Max	2017	Girada Unlimited
A Raw Belief	2017	Girada Unlimited
Crack a Joke, Have a Smoke (GIRADA05)	2018	Girada Unlimited
Camina O Revienta	2018	Girada Unlimited
3 Days (with Franco Cinelli)	2019	Girada Unlimited
Tales From The Parking Lot	2019	Girada Unlimited
Off The Beaten Tracks	2019	Rawax
FAS012+1	2023	Fathers & Sons Productions
Command Station	2023	Girada Unlimited
State Of Euphobia	2025	Girada Unlimited
FAS014	2025	Fathers & Sons Productions

=== Selected remixes ===
Original title	Artist	Year	Label
"Dance Me"	Bruno Nasty	2011	Microtech Records
"The Night Train"	Kadoc	2012	Fathers & Sons Productions (FAS003)
"Here And There"	Nick Beringer	2018	Berg Audio
"Unplait"	D&S	2021	Recycle Records

=== Selected compilation appearances ===
Compilation	Year	Label	Track
Tools For School 4	2011	Be As One Imprint	"Mentalism"
The Extended Family Part 2	2011	Leftroom	"Butterfly Conflict"
The Summer Soundtrack EP	2011	Leftroom	"Tromavilla Rocks"
Balance 023	2013	Balance Music	"Road To Dub"
La Familia	2013	VIVa Music	"Who Has The Juice"
Delicias	2013	Savor Music	"YMM Is Knocking"
Vagabundos 2013	2013	Cadenza	"The Night Train" (Julian Perez Remix)
Vagabundos 2013 Part 2	2013	Cadenza	"The Night Train" (Julian Perez Remix)
Cocoon Compilation N	2014	Cocoon Recordings	"Over The Rain"
Zehn	2015	Cocoon Recordings	"Over The Rain"
The Embrace Volume 1	2020	Dokutoku Records	"SxLow"
Espectrum II, EP2	2021	AvantRoots	"Wolframio"
