= Contigo (political party) =

Peruvian political party

With You Contigo
- Abbreviation: C
- President: Gilbert Violeta
- Secretary General: Salvador Heresi
- Founder: Pedro Pablo Kuczynski
- Founded: 2 March 2019
- Dissolved: 7 September 2021
- Preceded by: Peruvians for Change
- Ideology: Social conservatism Economic liberalism Right-wing populism
- Political position: Right-wing

Website
- www.partidocontigo.pe (archived)

Contigo (English: With You) was a right-wing political party in Peru.

Led by former congressmen Gilbert Violeta, Salvador Heresi and Juan Sheput, Contigo participated in the 2020 parliamentary snap election and the 2021 general election, on both occasions earning a low share of votes in comparison to the success of its preceding organization, Peruvians for Change, which achieved the Peruvian presidency with Pedro Pablo Kuczynski at the 2016 general election.

The party was officially dissolved following the 2021 general election for not passing the electoral threshold.

== History ==
In February 2019, Peruanos Por el Kambio (PpK), the party that had led Pedro Pablo Kuczynski to the presidency in 2016, and that in theory, served as the official government party of Martín Vizcarra's government, declared itself in reorganization and announced the creation of a party assembly to evaluate a probable name change. Kuczynski himself presented his irrevocable resignation to the presidency of PpK on 4 February 2019.

Shortly after the announcement of reorganization of the party, nine of the eleven PpK congressmen (the absent were Gilbert Violeta and Juan Sheput) met at the Government Palace with President Vizcarra and the members of the Council of Ministers, and agreed to continue supporting the government. It could be seen that the PpK bench had been divided into two factions: a majority, headed by Jorge Meléndez and Sergio Dávila, who wanted to continue supporting the government completely; and another, commanded by Violeta and Sheput, supported by what was left of

Vizcarra's estrangement from the PpK party was further aggravated by the revelation that the Construction Club had contributed US$100,000 for the 2016 Kuczynki campaign. Party leaders (Violeta, Heresi and the PpK general secretary Jorge Villacorta) agreed to hold Vizcarra responsible for controlling the financing of the campaign, as revealed in conversations on WhatsApp leaked to the press.

On 2 March 2019, the PpK party assembly agreed to change its name to Contigo. They also made official the registration of Juan Sheput which until then had only been extended an invitation.

The Contigo leadership said that the party supported Vizcarra "100%" and considered that the PpK bench in Congress should also change its name. But the PpK congressmen, with the exception of Violeta and Sheput, agreed to keep the original name, considering that the name with which the citizens had chosen them should be respected. Violeta and Sheput then asked the bench for a temporary license, but it did not accept and even opened a disciplinary process. Given this, both congressmen decided to quit the Peruvians for Change caucus, which was thus reduced to nine members (6 March 2019). None of these nine members of the PpK bench, including Mercedes Araoz and Carlos Bruce, is a member of the party; the last member, Clemente Flores, resigned from Contigo that same day. The party ceased to exist in the aftermath of the 2021 general election, in which the party participated without a presidential nominee and one congressional list only in Lima. Virtually impossible to pass the electoral threshold, Contigo obtained less than 0.1% of the popular vote, effectively losing its registration as a party.

== Elections to the Congress of the Republic ==
Election	Votes	%	Seats	▲/▼	Position
2020	158 120	1.1%	0 / 130	▼11	N/A
2021	5 787	0.1%	0 / 130	Steady	N/A
