= San Miguel District, Lima =

District in Lima, Peru

San Miguel
- District
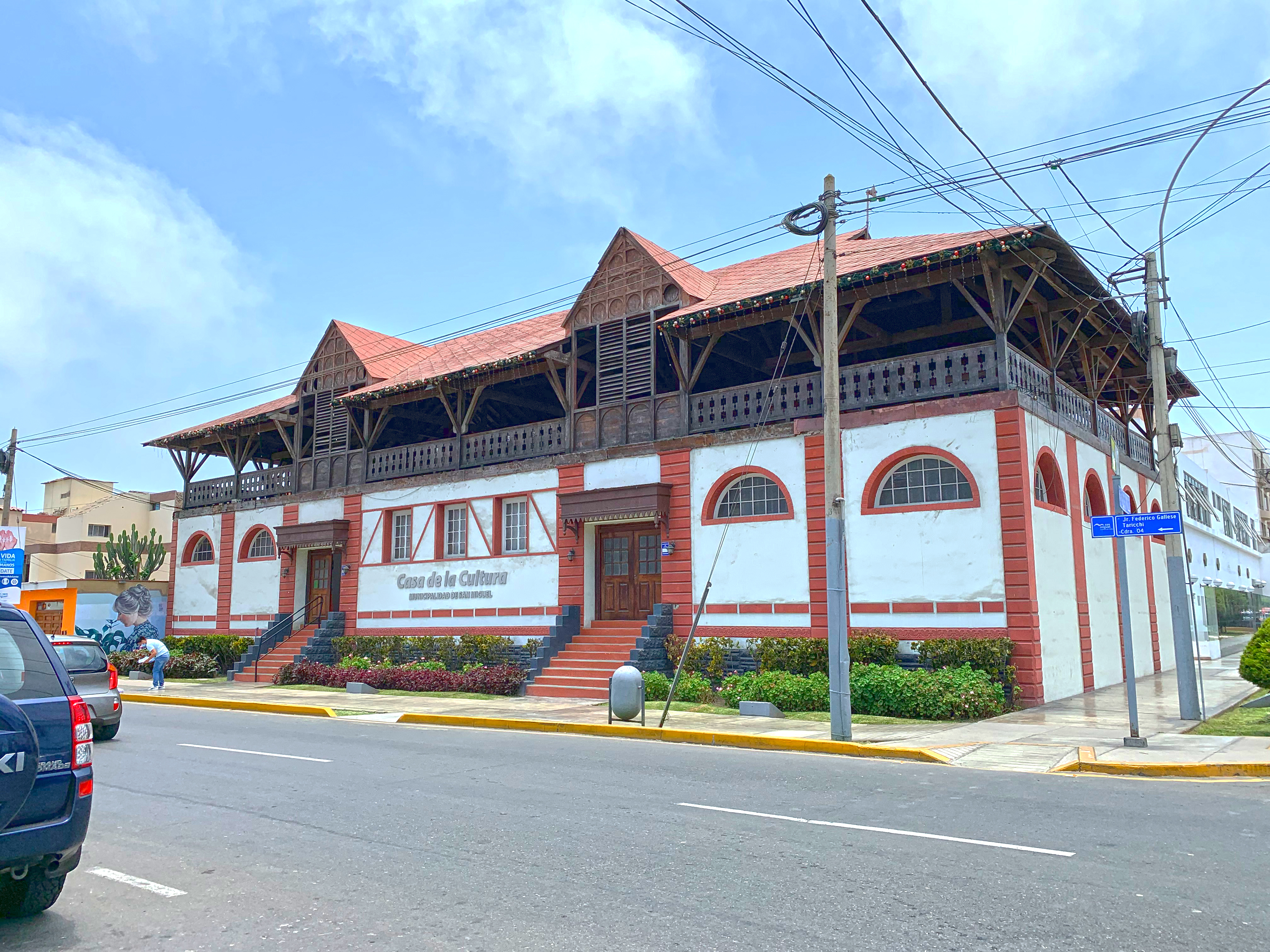
- House of Culture

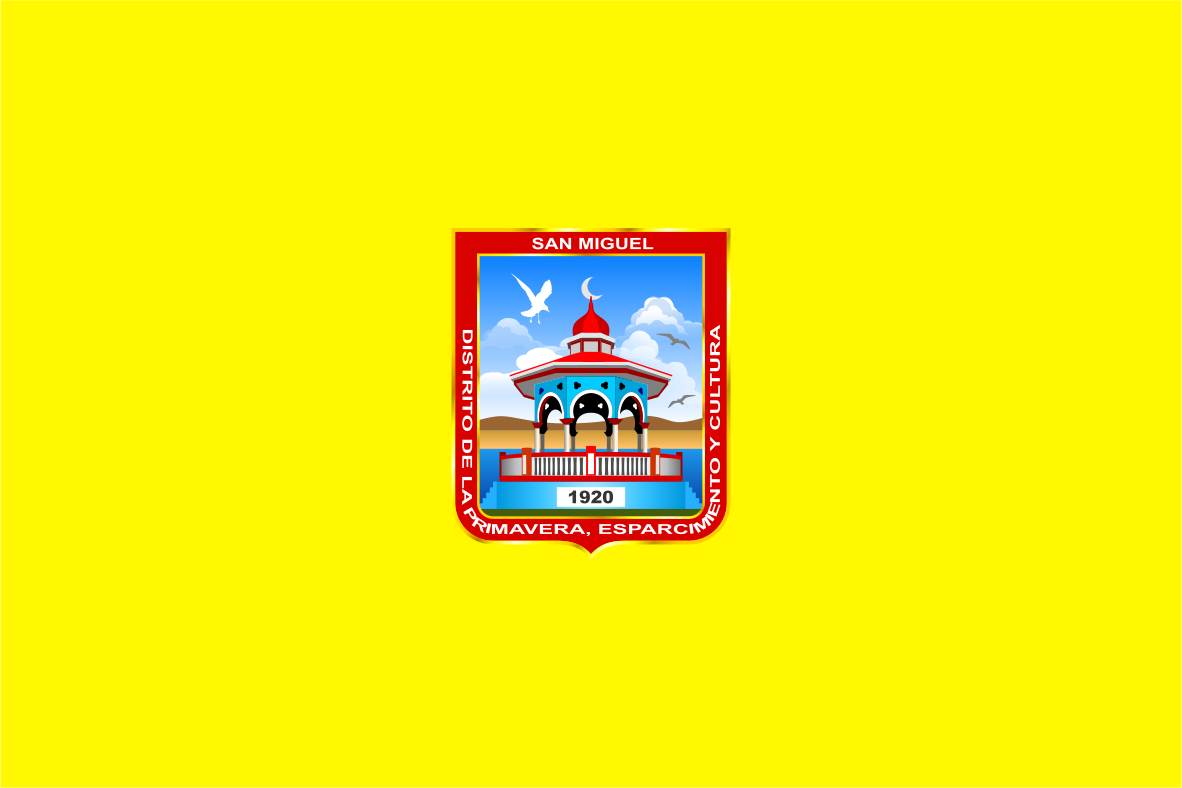
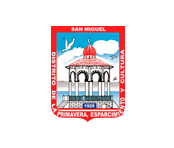
- Flag Coat of arms

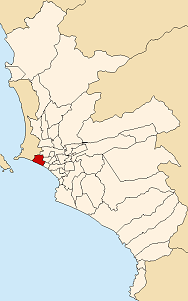
- Location of San Miguel in the Lima province
- Coordinates: 12°4′38″S 77°5′34″W
- Country: Peru
- Region: Lima
- Province: Lima
- Founded: October 5, 1920

Government
  - Mayor: Eduardo Bless (2023-2026)

Area
  - Total: 10.72 km^{2} (4.14 sq mi)

Population (2023)
  - Total: 183,597
  - Density: 17,130/km^{2} (44,360/sq mi)
  - Demonym: San miguelino/a
- Time zone: UTC-5 (PET)
- UBIGEO: 150136
- Website: www.munisanmiguel.gob.pe

San Miguel is one of the 43 districts that are part of the Lima province and of the urban area of Lima, Peru. It is bordered by the districts of Bellavista and downtown Lima on the north; Pueblo Libre, Magdalena del Mar and downtown Lima on the east; the Pacific Ocean on the south; and the La Perla district on the west.

San Miguel is an upper-class (65% of its population) and upper-middle class (35%) district with a very high HDI score.

== Geography ==
San Miguel is part of Lima's Cono Centro, an unofficial subregion of the city.

=== Climate ===
Climate data for Lima
Month	Jan	Feb	Mar	Apr	May	Jun	Jul	Aug	Sep	Oct	Nov	Dec	Year
Record high °F	79	79	79	75	72	68	66	64	66	68	72	75	72
Record high °C	26	26	26	24	22	20	19	18	19	20	22	24	22
Average precipitation days	1	1	0	0	1	2	3	3	3	2	2	0	16
Average rainy days	4	2	3	2	5	11	12	15	13	7	5	3	82
Average relative humidity (%)	85	80	80	85	85	85	85	85	85	85	85	85	84.2
Mean monthly sunshine hours	179.1	169	139.2	184	116.4	50.6	28.6	32.3	37.3	65.3	89	139.2	1,284
Source: Weatherbase (Temperature, precipitation and humidity). and Universidad Complutense de Madrid (Sunlight)

== Culture ==
=== Landmarks ===
The Parque de las Leyendas (the city's zoo), the parque de la imaginación, the parish church of San Miguel, and the Federico Villarreal National University are located in the district.

== Gallery ==
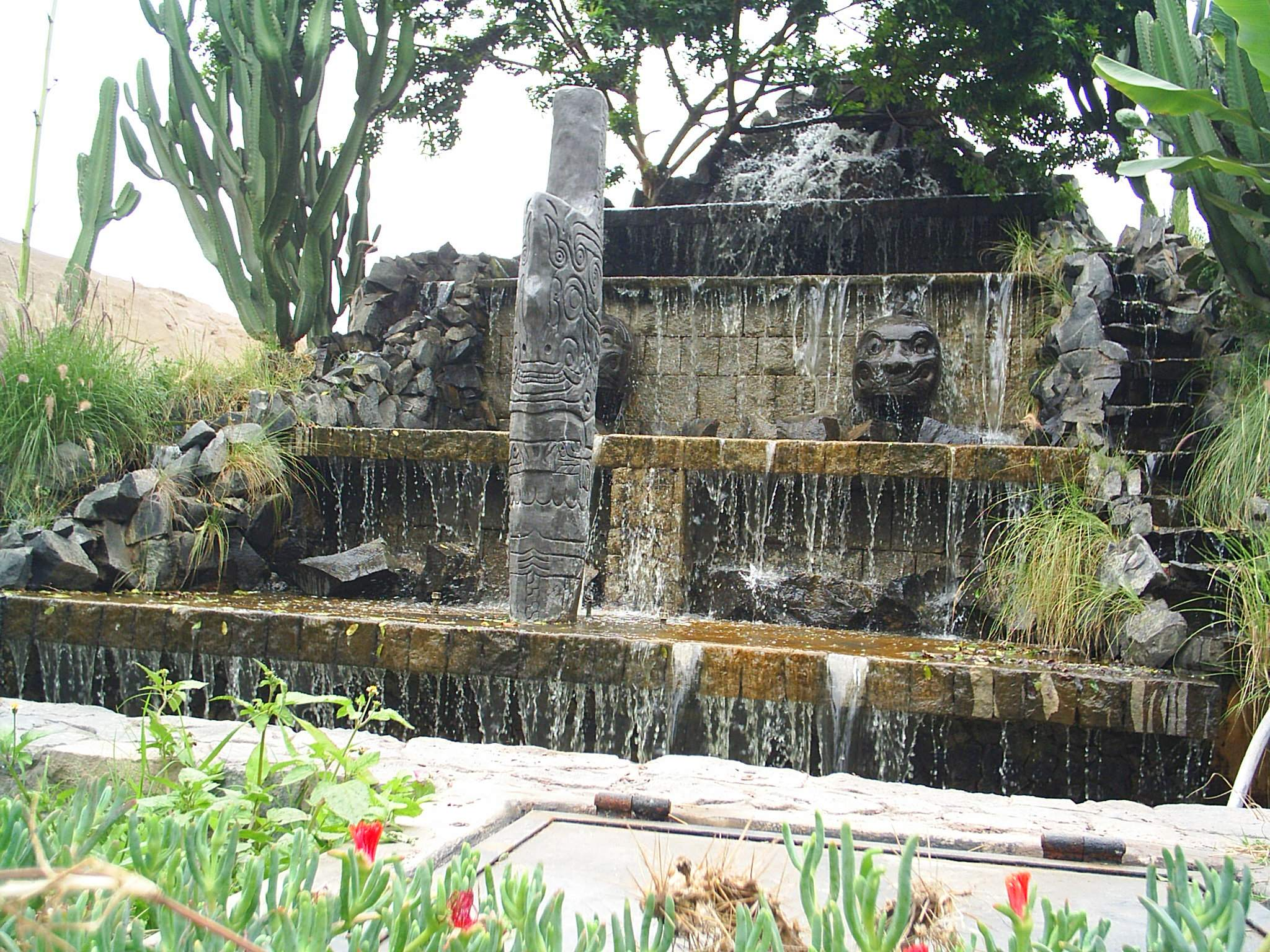
Parque de Las Leyendas, the city's zoo

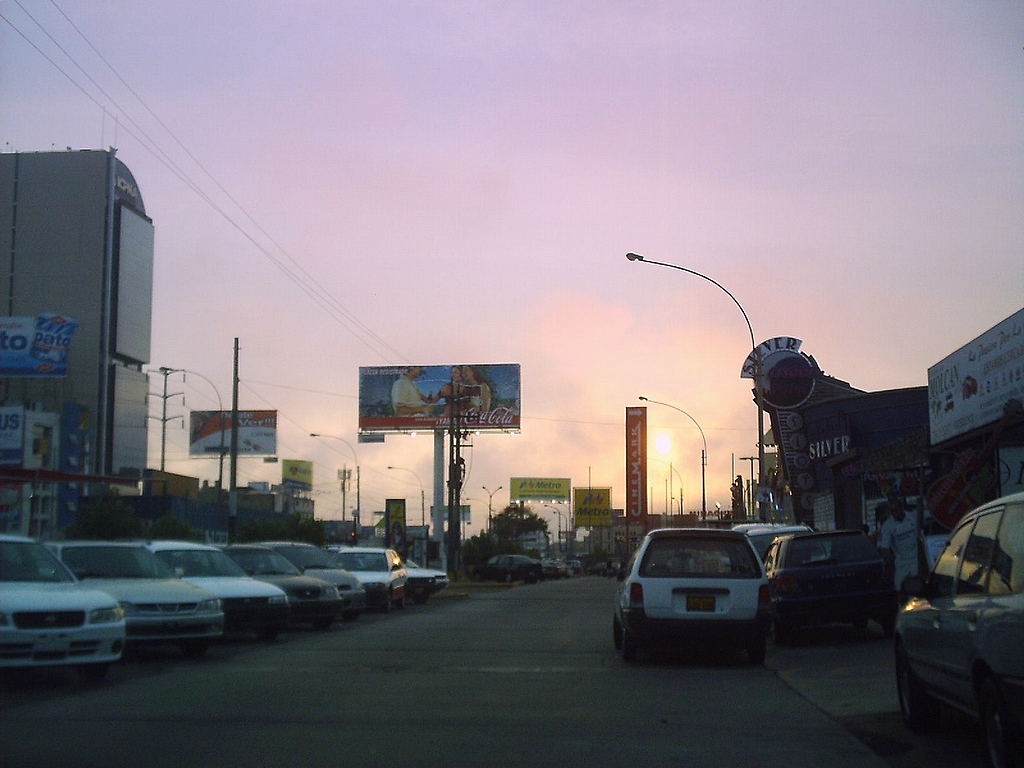
A view of San Miguel towards the west at sunset

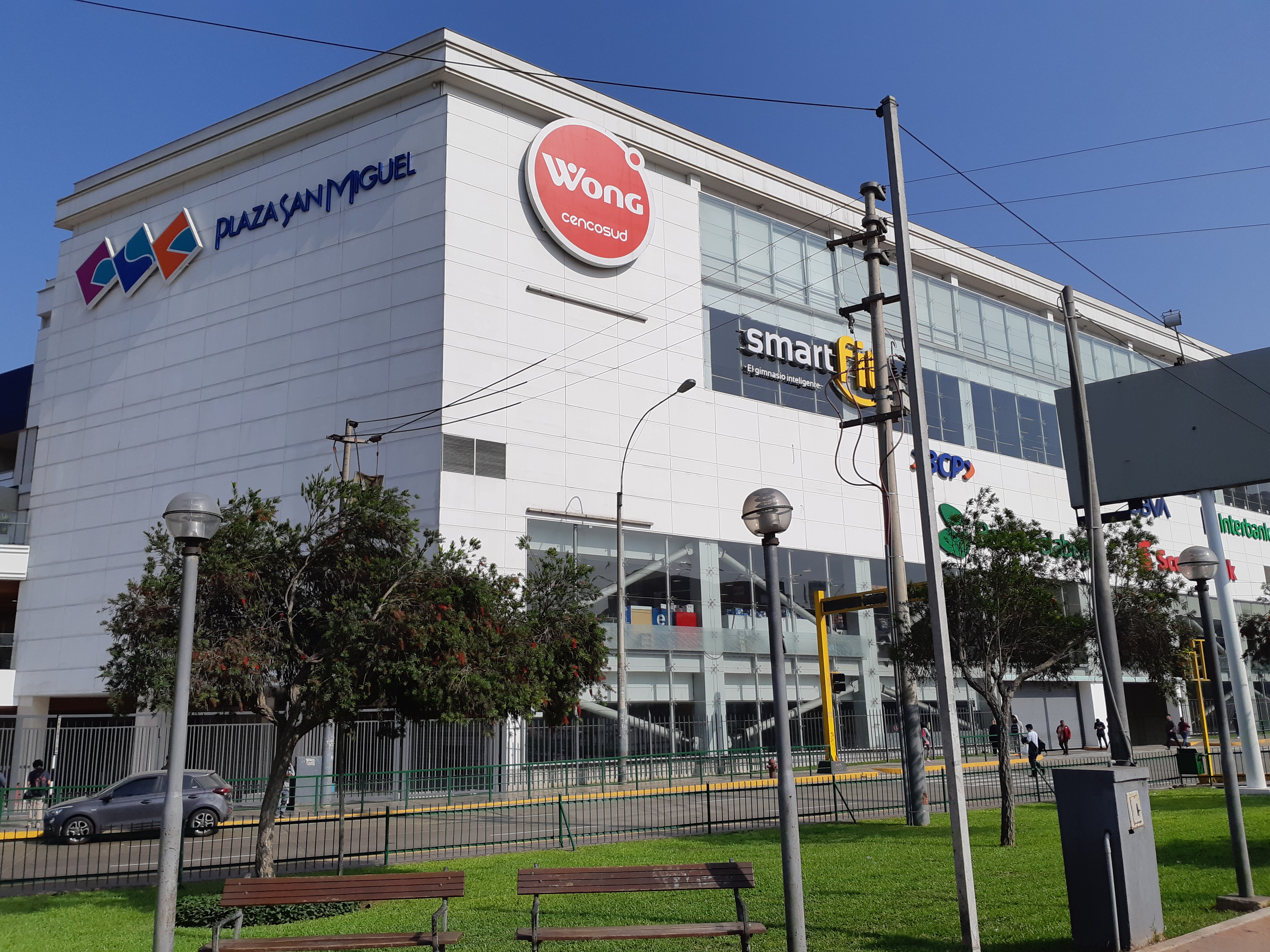
The Wong supermarket, Plaza San Miguel

== See also ==
- Administrative divisions of Peru
