= Federico Villarreal National University =

Public university in Lima, Peru

Universidad Nacional Federico Villarreal
- Universidad Nacional Federico Villarreal
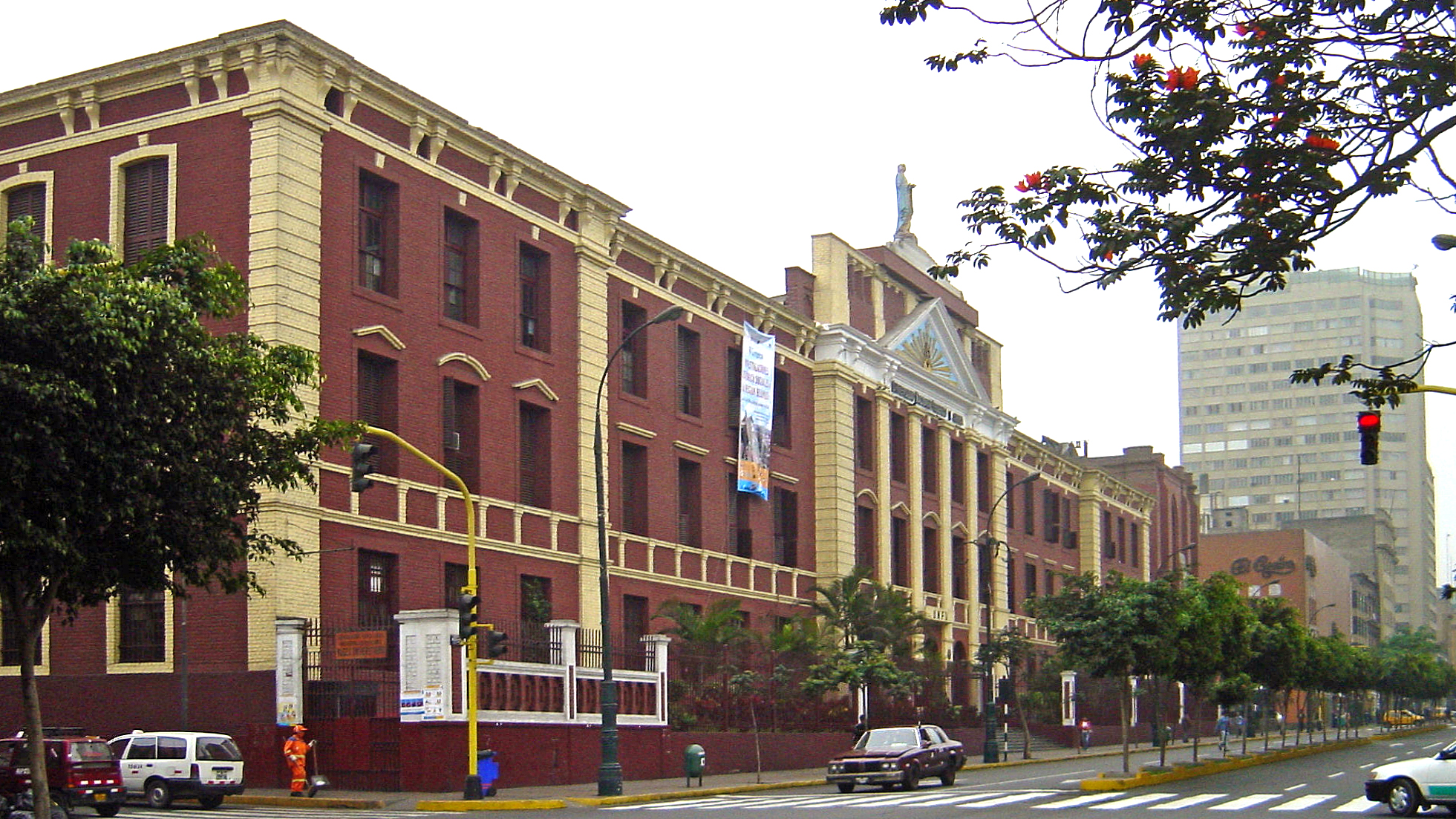
- UNFV campus near downtown of Lima
- Other names: UNFV
- Motto: Mi palabra forjará la raza
- Motto in English: My word will forge the race
- Type: Public university
- Established: 30 October 1963
- Affiliations: Universia; Alianza Estrategica; Compostela
- Rector: Dr. Cristina Asunción Alzamora Rivero
- Students: 22,670
- Location: Av. Nicolás de Piérola 355, Cercado de Lima 15001, Peru. Jr. Carlos Gonzáles 285, Urb. Maranga, San Miguel C. San Marcos 351, Urb. Silgal, Pueblo Libre, Lima, Peru; 12°4′31″S 77°5′31″W
- Campus: Urban
- Colors: Orange; Black
- Website: web2.unfv.edu.pe
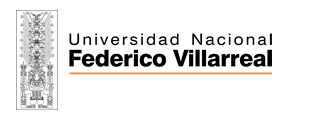

Federico Villarreal National University (Spanish: Universidad Nacional Federico Villarreal, UNFV) is a public university located in Lima, Peru. It was named in honor of the Peruvian mathematician Federico Villarreal.

== History ==
It first functioned as a branch of the Community University of the Center - Universidad Comunal del Centro (UCC) based in Huancayo. That same year, the Peruvian geographer, philosopher, historian and politician Javier Pulgar Vidal was commissioned to manage the university.

The Lima branch of the UCC began its activities in a rented house, located at 262 Moquegua street. The entrance exams were set for the month of August 1960 and classes began on 16 September of the same year.

In 1961, the Community University of the Center was nationalized as the National University of the Center of Peru. Due to the emergence of disagreements with the central headquarters in Junin, Víctor Raúl Haya de la Torre promoted the creation of the Lima branch and thus managed to declare its autonomy in January 1963.

The Federico Villarreal National University was created by Order Nº 14692 on 30 October 1963. The law to create the university was presented by the APRA parliamentary bench, exposed and defended by Luis Alberto Sánchez, and promulgated by Fernando Belaunde Terry.

== Organization ==
The UNFV is organized into 18 faculties:

- Administration
- Economics
- Health sciences - Hipolito Unanue (located near the Hipolito Unanue National Hospital in El Agustino)
- Laws and political sciences
- Education
- Humanities
- Civil engineering
- Industrial and systems engineering
- Geographical, Environmental and Ecotourism Engineering
- Oceanography, Fisheries, Food Sciences and Aquaculture
- Electronic and Computer Engineering
- Natural Sciences and Mathematics
- odontology
- Medical technology
- Psychology
- agricultural sciences,
- engineering sciences
- architecture
- accounting
- social sciences

Together they are offering 60 bachelor programs, 52 master programs, and 13 doctorates.

== Rankings ==
Federico Villarreal National University is one of the best public universities of Peru.

In 2021, the Webometrics Ranking of World Universities of the Spanish National Research Council (CSIC) ranked the Federico Villarreal National University in the 27th place in the country, in its ranking.

== Notable alumni ==
See also Category:Federico Villarreal National University alumni

- Laura Bozzo (TV talk show presenter and lawyer)
- Mercedes Cabanillas (educator and politician)
- César Hildebrandt (journalist)
- José Luis Pérez-Albela (doctor-writer, former athlete and lecturer)
- Alejandro Aguinaga (administrator, surgeon and politician)
- Arturo Cavero Velásquez (singer of Creole music)
- José Antonio Chang (industrial engineer, rector and politician)
- Teófilo Cubillas (soccer player, accountant)
- Liliana La Rosa (nurse, university professor and former minister)
- Luis Nava Guibert (lawyer and politician)
- Julián Pérez Huarancca (novelist and short story writer)
- Nidia Vílchez (public and political accountant)
- César Villanueva (administrator and politician)
- José Watanabe (poet)
- Juan Sheput (industrial engineer, politician and university professor)
- Zulema Tomás (doctor, politician and ex health minister)

== Cooperations ==
- University of Salamanca
- Complutense University of Madrid
- Harvard University - Laspau
- Virginia International University
- National University of Colombia
- Autonomous University of Asunción
- Technical University of Machala
- Municipal University of Sao Caetano do Sul
- University of Buenos Aires
- University of Seville
- University of La Laguna
- University of Atlántico

Continuing on the route of internationalization, since 2017, UNFV joined the Compostela Group of Universities.
