= Peruvians for Change =

Peruvian political party

Peruvians for Change Peruanos Por el Kambio
- Abbreviation: PPK
- Leader: Pedro Pablo Kuczynski
- President: Gilbert Violeta
- Secretary-General: Salvador Heresi
- Founded: 15 October 2014
- Dissolved: 2 March 2019
- Succeeded by: Contigo
- Ideology: Liberalism; Liberal conservatism Social liberalism
- Political position: Centre-right
- Colors: Pink; Cyan; Yellow

Website
- www.peruanosporelkambio.pe (archived)

Peruvians for Change (Spanish: Peruanos Por el Kambio, PPK) was a centre-right party in Peru.

Founded and officially registered in October 2014, the party was described as conservative and liberal. Its leader was Pedro Pablo Kuczynski, President of Peru from 2016 until his resignation in 2018.

In his short presidential tenure, Kuczynski held a government minority in the Peruvian Congress against Popular Force's majority. Initially with 18 members, the party's parliamentary caucus ended splitting up into factions, as independent congressmen left following the pardon of Alberto Fujimori in December 2017. Amid scandal revolving on the president's past relationship with Odebrecht, and facing two impeachment processes, Kuczynski tendered his resignation in March 2018.

The party in theory served as President Martín Vizcarra's government party even though he was not registered but ended up in a bitter conflict between the executive branch and the parliamentary caucus, as they held many disagreements on policy and government decisions. Following to the party's poor results at the 2018 regional and municipal elections, and Kuczynski's resignation to the party's presidency, the National Executive Committee agreed on re-founding the party under the name Contigo in March 2019, thus effectively dissolving Peruvians for Change.

The incorrect spelling Kambio instead of Cambio ("change" in Spanish) was intended to make the party have the same initials as its founder.

== History ==
=== Background ===
To participate as a presidential nominee in the 2011 general election, Pedro Pablo Kuczynski formed the Alliance for the Great Change, a coalition of composed of by the Christian People's Party, Alliance for Progress, National Restoration, and the Peruvian Humanist Party. Kuczynski himself was non-partisan.

During the campaign, Kuczynski was not well known, and was initially seen as an upper-class candidate due to his technical profile, skin color, and non-Hispanic last name. However, he achieved great popularity with the so-called “PPKuy” as the coalition's mascot, a guinea pig -an animal representative of Peru, and in particular, of the indigenous popular classes- dressed in the colors of the alliance. The other important element was a good handling of social media, which allowed him to connect with the youth. The use of social media made its first appearance in Peruvian politics in these elections. Kuczynski also tried to project the image of the "sympathetic gringo" through dance, with this being reinforced when a follower grabbed his genitals during a campaign trail, which generated great press coverage.

In the 2011 general election, Pedro Pablo Kuczynski finished third in the first round with 18.51% of the popular vote, below nominees Ollanta Humala of Peru Wins and Keiko Fujimori of Force 2011. Although Kuczynski and the coalition publicly endorsed Fujimori, Humala would prevailed in the run-off, thus assuming the presidency for the 2011–2016 term. At congressional level, the coalition attained 12 seats in Congress, being the fourth most represented caucus after Peru Wins, Force 2011 and Possible Peru Alliance, which obtained 47, 37 and 21 seats respectively.

Following the dissolution of the Alliance for the Great Change in the Peruvian Congress and Kuczynski's desire to have his own party, he decided to form Peruvians for Change.

=== Foundation ===
The party was officially founded on 15 October 2014 under the name Peru +, as the National Elections Jury formally registered the party. Ideologically described as a liberal party, the party's campaign colors were pink, sky blue, and yellow, similar to its predecessor, the Alliance for the Great Change.

On 16 February 2015, the first party National Statutory Assembly was held, which decided to change the name to Peruvians for Change. The word "Kambio" was written with a "K" intentionally, so that the party had the same initials as its founder.

=== 2016 general election ===
Following the name-change of the party, Pedro Pablo Kuczynski started a full-scale presidential campaign, as he recruited independent former ministers and congressmen from previous administrations. Among his recruits, former Governor Martín Vizcarra of Moquegua, and former minister Mercedes Aráoz were chosen as Kuczynski's running mates, confirming the party's ticket. Other prominent inclusions were former ministers Carlos Bruce, Gino Costa, and Juan Sheput, and vintner businessman Pedro Olaechea, all running to the Peruvian Congress under the constituency of Lima.

On 26 April 2015, Kuczynski formally announced his intention to run in the 2016 general election to be held on 10 April 2016. In the election's first round, the party won 21.04% of the popular vote, reaching second place behind front-runner Keiko Fujimori of the Popular Force, who obtained 39.86% of the popular vote.

During the second round campaign, there was a high polarization between the followers of Fujimori or Fujimorism and anti-Fujimorism. As a result of this, most of the presidential nominees who participated in the first round were forced to support one or the other candidate, with Kuczynski receiving the key endorsement of Verónika Mendoza of Broad Front, just days before the run-off. On the day of the run-off, 6 June 2016, Pedro Pablo Kuczynski was projected as the winner, winning 50.12% of the popular vote over the 49.88% of Keiko Fujimori. Following Fujimori's defeat concession five days into the election, Kuczynski was declared president-elect on 28 June 2016 by the National Elections Jury.

=== Presidency of Pedro Pablo Kuczynski (2016–2018) ===
Pedro Pablo Kuczynski was sworn in as president on 28 July 2016. From the start of his presidency, relations between the legislative and executive branches remained tense, and on 15 September 2017, Congress denied the vote of confidence on Fernando Zavala's cabinet, with which Kuczynski had to appoint a new cabinet. This included five new ministers, and was chaired by Second Vice President Mercedes Aráoz.

His government was also marked by the Odebrecht case. Kuczynski himself was the subject of an impeachment process in Congress for his conflicts of interest with the Brazilian conglomerate, which was unsuccessful in the first attempt on 21 December 2017. Shortly afterwards, a presidential pardon was granted to former President Alberto Fujimori, who was serving a 25-year sentence for crimes against human rights. The decision sparked mass protests across the country, as well as the resignation of three of his ministers and criticism from a wide spectrum of personalities. At party level, three congressmen from Peruvians for Change left the parliamentary caucus. All of this led to a national political crisis.

In March 2018, a second impeachment process was activated, this time promoted by the left (Broad Front and New Peru) and the oppositional Popular Force. But a few days before the impeachment process was debated in Congress, the opposition revealed videos and audios showing government operators, including the Minister of Production, Bruno Giuffra, were negotiating with a congressmen from Popular Force to buy their vote against the impeachment, in exchange for works for their respective constituencies. The following day, Kuczynski sent tendered his resignation to Congress, which was accepted on 23 March 2018. First Vice President Martín Vizcarra, who was serving simultaneously as the Peruvian Ambassador to Canada, returned to Peru in order to be sworn as the new president.

=== Presidency of Martín Vizcarra and Contigo (2018–2019) ===
At the start of his presidency, Martín Vizcarra faced controversy as he appointed as his Prime Minister César Villanueva, a congressman representing the San Martín constituency who led the second impeachment process against Pedro Pablo Kuczynski. In order to earn the party's caucus support, Vizcarra appointed party Secretary General and congressman Salvador Heresi as Minister of Justice.

In July 2018, audios revealing vast cronyism in the Peruvian judiciary -involving Heresi directly- forced his resignation. President Vizcarra publicly asked Heresi to resign as Minister of Justice, marking a tense relationship with the party as he seemingly fired its Secretary General from his cabinet.

Throughout 2018, the Peruvians for Change parliamentary caucus underwent a severe internal crisis as it divided into two factions, with one supporting the Vizcarra's government, and the other maintaining distance from it. On the other side, Vizcarra publicly marked his distance from the party. At local level, the party only managed to win 2 provinces and 3 districts at the 2018 regional and municipal elections.

Vizcarra's estrangement from the PpK party was further aggravated by the revelation that the Construction Club had contributed US$100,000 for the 2016 Kuczynki campaign. Party leaders (Violeta, Heresi and the PpK general secretary Jorge Villacorta) agreed to hold Vizcarra responsible for controlling the financing of the campaign, as revealed in conversations on WhatsApp leaked to the press.

In February 2019, Pedro Pablo Kuczynski resigned as party president, thus making party Vice President Gilbert Violeta his successor. In the following weeks, discussions were held in order to change the party's name. Finally, on 2 March 2019, the party assembly convened and agreed on the party's re-foundation under the name Contigo (With you), ending the namesake association with its founder.

== Election results ==
=== Presidential elections ===
Year	Candidate	Party	Votes	Percentage	Outcome
2016	Pedro Pablo Kuczynski	Peruvians for Change	1st Round: 3 228 661	1st Round: 21.04	1st Round: 2nd
2016	Pedro Pablo Kuczynski	Peruvians for Change	2nd Round: 8 596 937	2nd Round: 50.12	2nd Round: 1st

=== Elections to the Congress of the Republic ===
Year	Votes	%	Seats	▲/▼	Position
2016	2 007 742	16.5%	18 / 130	▲18	Minority

=== Regional and municipal elections ===
Year	Gobiernos Regionales	Alcaldías Provinciales	Alcaldías Distritales
Year	Outcome	Outcome	Outcome
2018	0 / 25	2 / 196	3 / 1,678
