= Acuña =

Acuña or Acuna may refer to:

== People with the surname ==
- Alejandro Nogués Acuña (1907–1989), Argentine chess player
- Alex Acuña (born 1944), Peruvian percussionist
- Ángela Acuña Braun (1888–1983) first female attorney in Central America (from Costa Rica)
- Antonio Osorio de Acuña (1459–1526), Spanish bishop
- Brianda de Acuña (1576–1630), Spanish nun and writer
- Carlos Acuña (1914–1999), Argentine composer and singer
- Carlos Manuel Acuña (1937–2013), Argentine journalist
- Carlos Javier Acuña (born 1988), Paraguayan football (soccer) player
- Clarence Acuña (born 1975), Chilean footballer
- Cristóbal Diatristán de Acuña (1597–1676), Spanish missionary and explorer
- Diego Sarmiento de Acuña, conde de Gondomar (1567–1626), Spanish diplomat
- Elisa Acuña (1887-1946), Mexican journalist
- Fort Acuña, a Filipino basketball player
- Francisco Acuña de Figueroa (1791–1862), Uruguayan poet
- Francisco Javier González-Acuña, Mexican mathematician, professor, and author
- Hernando de Acuña (c. 1520–1580), Spanish poet, soldier and diplomat
- Jason Acuña (born 1973), Italian-born American actor
- Johany Alexánder Acuña (born 1997), Colombian serial killer
- Juan Acuña (1923–2001), Spanish football goalkeeper
- Juan Manuel Acuña (1921–1989), Chilean footballer
- Juan Vitalio Acuña Núñez (1925–1967), Cuban politician
- Juan de Acuña, marqués de Casafuerte (1658–1734), Spanish military officer and viceroy of New Spain from 1722 to 1734
- Judith Elida Acuña, Argentine politician
- Julián Acuña Galé (1900–1973), Cuban botanist for whom the standard author abbreviation "Acuna" is used when citing a botanical name
- Justicia Acuña (1893–1980), Chilean engineer; first woman with this profession in her country and in South America
- Luis Acuña (born 1989), Argentine footballer
- Luisangel Acuña (born 2002), Venezuelan professional baseball player
- Manuel Acuña (1849–1873), Mexican poet and playwright
- Manuel Acuña Roxas (1892–1948), President of the Philippines
- Marcela Acuña (born 1976), Argentine boxer
- Marcos Acuña (born 1991), Argentine footballer
- Mario Acuña (1940–2009), Argentine astrophysicist
- Mathías Acuña (1992–2025), Uruguayan footballer
- Mirta Acuña de Baravalle (1925–2024), Argentine human rights activist
- Patrick Acuña (born 1986), American musician, drummer of the indie rock band Silent Old Mtns
- Pedro Bravo de Acuña (died 1606), Spanish military officer and colonial official in the New World and the Philippines
- Ricardo Acuña (born 1958), Chilean former tennis player
- Ricardo Acuña (judoka) (born 1971), Mexican judoka
- Roberto Acuña (born 1972), Argentine-born Paraguayan football (soccer) player
- Roberto Acuña (basketball) (born 1990), Argentine basketball player
- Rodolfo Acuña (1932–2026), American historian
- Ronald Acuña Jr. (born 1997), Venezuelan professional baseball player
- Val Acuña, a Filipino basketball player
- Valentino Acuña (born 2006), Argentine footballer
- Walter Acuña (born 1992), Argentine footballer

== Places ==
- Ciudad Acuña, Coahuila, Mexico
- Acuña (municipality), also in the Mexican state of Coahuila

== See also ==
- Vilo Acuña Airport, Cuba
- Ing. Alberto Acuña Ongay International Airport, serving Campeche, Mexico
