= Aurelio Sousa Matute =

Peruvian lawyer and politician

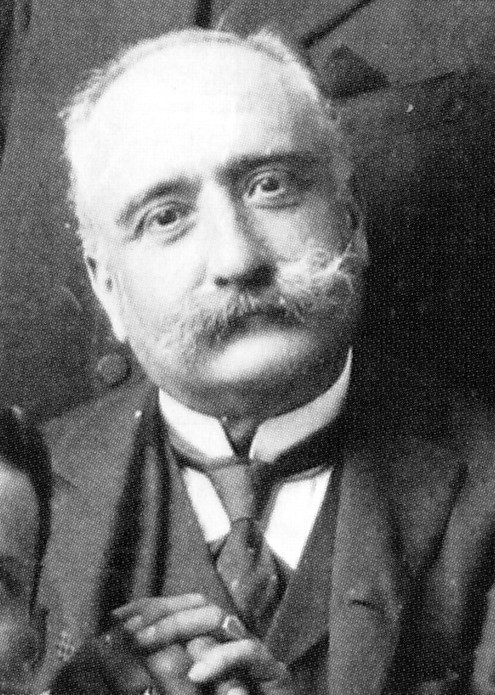

Aurelio Sousa y Matute (August 31, 1860 – February 26, 1925) was a Peruvian lawyer and politician. He was born in the Cajamarca Region of Peru. He graduated from the National University of San Marcos. He served in the Chamber of Deputies of Peru and was its president from 1899 to 1900. He also served in the Senate of Peru. He served as minister of justice (August 22 – October 22, 1914), interior (June 17 – July 27, 1913) and minister of economy and finance (September 22–November 11, 1914) in the Government of Peru. He was twice Prime Minister of Peru (June–July 1913, August–November 1914). He died in Nice, France.

Preceded by Federico Luna y Peralta	Prime Minister of Peru; June 17 – July 27, 1913	Succeeded by Enrique Varela Vidaurre
Preceded by Manuel Melitón Carvajal	Prime Minister of Peru; August 22 – November 11, 1914	Succeeded by Germán Schreiber Waddington

== Bibliography ==
- Basadre Grohmann, Jorge: Historia de la República del Perú (1822–1933), Tomos 12 y 13. Editada por la Empresa Editora El Comercio S. A. Lima, 2005. ISBN 9972-205-74-6 (V.12) – ISBN 9972-205-75-4 (V.13)
- Tauro del Pino, Alberto: Enciclopedia Ilustrada del Perú. Tercera Edición. Tomo 15, SAL/SZY. Lima, PEISA, 2001. ISBN 9972-40-164-2
