= Enrique C. Basadre Stevenson =

Peruvian physician and politician

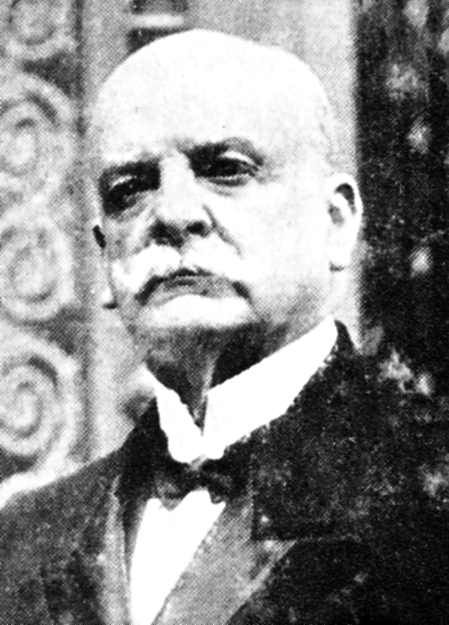
Stevenson c. 1910

Enrique C. Basadre Stevenson (c. 1848 – February 22, 1925) was a Peruvian physician and politician. He was born in Tacna, Peru and graduated from the University of San Marcos. Stevenson served as minister of the interior (November 1910 – August 1911) in the Government of Peru and was Prime Minister of Peru (December 1910 – August 31, 1911) under President Augusto B. Leguía y Salcedo. He was a member of the Senate of Peru (1920–1925). Stevenson died in Lima, Peru.

Preceded by José Manuel García	Minister of Interior of Peru; November 3, 1910 – August 31, 1911	Succeeded by Juan de Dios Salazar y Oyarzábal
Preceded by José Salvador Cavero Ovalle	Prime Minister of Peru; December 27, 1910 – August 31, 1911	Succeeded by Agustín Guillermo Ganoza Cavero

== Bibliography ==
- Basadre, Jorge: Historia de la República del Perú. 1822 - 1933, Octava Edición, corregida y aumentada. Tomo 10. Editada por el Diario "La República" de Lima y la Universidad "Ricardo Palma". Impreso en Santiago de Chile, 1998.
- Guerra, Margarita: Historia General del Perú. La República Aristocrática. Tomo XI. Primera Edición. Editor Carlos Milla Batres. Lima, Perú, 1984. Depósito Legal: B. 22436-84 (XI).
- Tauro del Pino, Alberto: Enciclopedia Ilustrada del Perú. Tercera Edición. Tomo 2. ANG/BED. Lima, PEISA, 2001. ISBN 9972-40-151-0
- UNMSM (publicaciones): La Universidad Mayor de San Marcos y los sanmarquinos durante y después de la guerra con Chile
