= Domingo M. Almenara Butler =

Peruvian lawyer, judge and politician

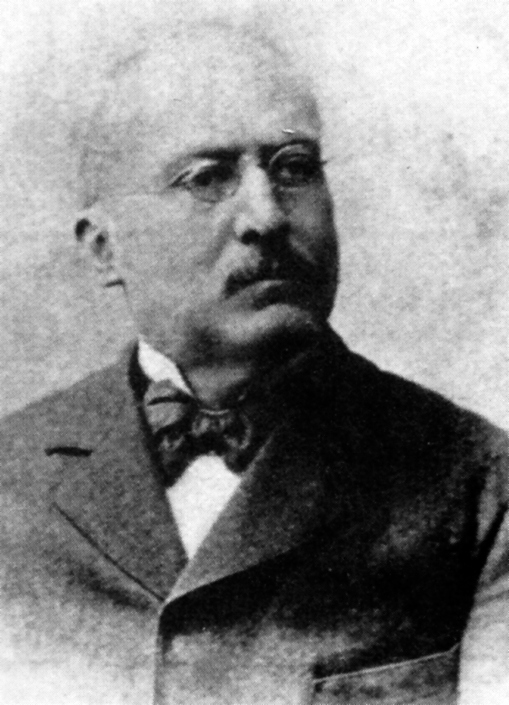

Manuel Domingo Melquiades Almenara Butler (August 4, 1848 – June 20, 1931) was a Peruvian lawyer, judge and politician. He was a member of the Civilista Party. He was Prime Minister of Peru (October 1900 – September 1901). He simultaneously served as minister of the interior in the Government of Peru. He was Minister of Finance from 1900 to 1901. He was President of the Supreme Court of Peru (1914–1916). He died in Lima, Peru.

== Bibliography ==
- Basadre, Jorge: Historia de la República del Perú. 1822 - 1933, Octava Edición, corregida y aumentada. Tomos 8 y 9. Editada por el Diario "La República" de Lima y la Universidad "Ricardo Palma". Impreso en Santiago de Chile, 1998.
- Tauro del Pino, Alberto: Enciclopedia Ilustrada del Perú. Tercera Edición. Tomo 1. AAA/ANG. Lima, PEISA, 2001. ISBN 9972-40-150-2

Preceded by Enrique Coronel Zegarra y Cortés	Prime Minister of Peru; October 2, 1900 – September 11, 1901	Succeeded by Cesáreo Chacaltana Reyes
Preceded by José V. Larrabure	Minister of Economy and Finance of Peru; October 2, 1900 – September 9, 1900	Succeeded by Adrián Ward
Preceded by Francisco José Eguiguren Escudero	President of the Supreme Court of Peru; 1914–1916	Succeeded by Adolfo Villa García
