= Manuel Antonio Barinaga =

Peruvian politician and lawyer

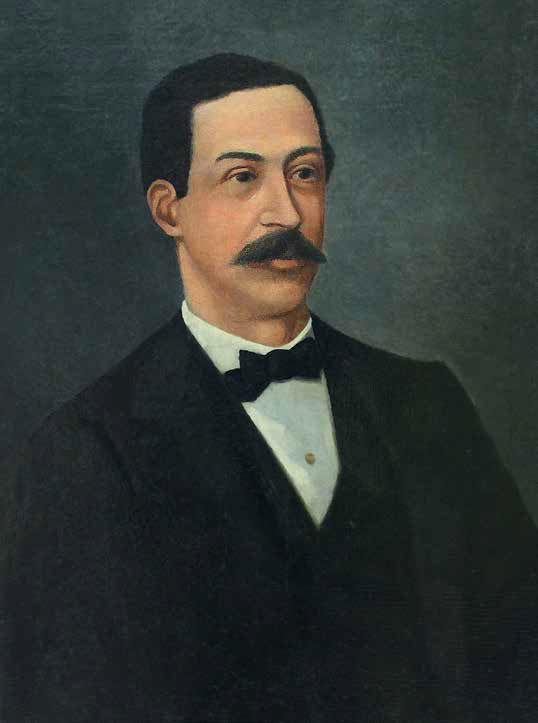
Manuel Antonio Barinaga (1897)

Manuel Antonio Barinaga (died 1897) was a 19th-century Peruvian lawyer and politician. He was born in Lima, Peru. He served as minister of finance and economy (1878 and 1879–1881), and justice in the Government of Peru. He served twice as Prime Minister of Peru (August 1883 – April 1884, November 1895 – August 1896).

Preceded by Lorenzo Iglesias Pino de Arce	Prime Minister of Peru; August 27, 1883 – April 7, 1884	Succeeded by Mariano Castro Zaldívar Iglesias
Preceded by Antonio Bentín y La Fuente	Prime Minister of Peru; November 30, 1895 – August 8, 1896	Succeeded by Manuel Pablo Olaechea Guerrero

== Bibliography ==
- Basadre Grohmann, Jorge: Historia de la República del Perú. 1822 - 1933, Octava Edición, corregida y aumentada. Tomos 7, 8 y 9. Editada por el Diario "La República" de Lima y la Universidad "Ricardo Palma". Impreso en Santiago de Chile, 1998.
- Vargas Ugarte, Rubén: Historia General del Perú, Tomo X. La República (1879-1884). Lima, Editorial Milla Batres, 1984. Segunda Edición.
