= José Salvador Cavero Ovalle =

Peruvian lawyer, judge, university lecturer, soldier and politician

José Salvador Cavero Ovalle (Huanta, 19 February 1850 - Lima, 19 February 1940) was a Peruvian lawyer, judge, university lecturer, soldier and politician.

Under the orders of Andrés A. Cáceres, Cavero fought in the defense of Lima and in the resistance campaign in Sierra, during the War of the Pacific. He was Minister of Finance (1893), Minister of Justice (1894 and 1910), Minister of Government (1894-1895), Vice President of Peru (1904-1908) and President of the Council of Ministers (1910). He was also Senator for Ayacucho on multiple occasions and Deputy for Huanta. As a magistrate, he reached the position of Prosecutor of the Supreme Court.

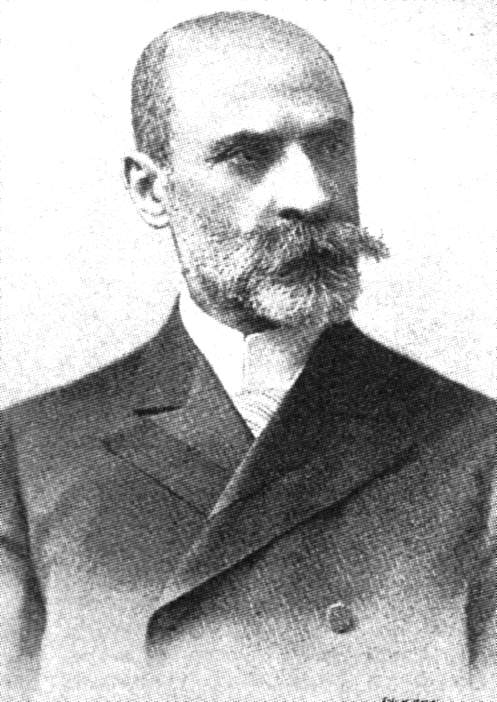
José Salvador Cavero

== Early life ==
Cavero studied at the Colegio Nacional San Ramón de Ayacucho and then went on to the University of San Marcos, from where he graduated as a bachelor, graduate and doctor of Jurisprudence (1876).

Cavero began his teaching career as an assistant professor of Special Rights in 1876. That same year, he was elected as a deputy from Huanta, an office he held till 1878.

In charge of the Ayacucho prefecture during the War of the Pacific, Cavero formed and equipped a 500-strong battalion, which he led to Lima in December 1879, to support the defense of the Peruvian capital. While serving as a lieutenant colonel, he participated in the battle of San Juan and the battle of Miraflores as an assistant to Colonel Cáceres. During this conflict Cavero received three injuries that caused the amputation of his left arm.

In 1881, Cavero joined the Resistance Army of Sierra and fought in the Battle of Pucará of 5 February 1882. Throughout the Sierra or La Breña war, he served as secretary of the Cáceres chieftain.

== Political career ==
Cavero was a senator for Ayacucho in the Congress meeting in Arequipa, which functioned from April 28 to July 20, 1883, under the auspices of the interim government of Rear Admiral Lizardo Montero. Having made peace with Chile and participated in National Reconstruction, he was active in politics and was elected senator in 1886, 1888, 1889 and 1894.

In 1889 Cavero was appointed judge of the First circuit of Lima, a function that he suspended when he was appointed Prefect of Arequipa in 1890. He resigned from this position the following year, after being elected deputy from Huanta. In 1892 he became Prosecutor of the Superior Court of Lima and in 1893 he assumed the post of Minister of Finance of the government of Remigio Morales Bermúdez, a position he held until the following year.

During the controversial second government of Cáceres, Cavero served as Minister of Justice and Minister of Government (1894-1895).

In 1903 Cavero entered the Supreme Court of Justice and was in charge of preparing reform of the Penal codes and Criminal Procedures.

Cavero was elected first vice president of the Republic of the first government of José Pardo y Barreda (1904-1908); in fact, he was the only one in that position, since there was no second vice president. He stood out for promoting reform of public education.

During the first government of Augusto B. Leguía, Cavero was Minister of Justice and President of the Council of Ministers, from November 3 to December 27, 1910.

Cavero retired from the magistracy in 1912. At the beginning of "Oncenio", he was elected senator for Ayacucho, a position he held from 1919 to 1924 . As a representative of the legislature he went to Washington D.C. to participate in the negotiations with Chile on the occasion of the final settlement of the Tacna and Arica question. Then he retired to private life.

He died in Lima, on February 19, 1940. The newspaper El Comercio highlighted in 1950 his skills as a great jurist, self-sacrificing patriot and honest politician.

== Bibliography ==
- Basadre Grohmann, Jorge: Hestoria de la República de Perú (1822 - 1933), Volume 12. Edited by Empresa Editora El Comercio S. A. Lima, 2005. ISBN 9972-205-74-6
- Tauro del Pino, Alberto: Enciclopedia Ilustrada del Perú. Third Edition. Volume 4, CAN/CHO. Lima, PEISA, 2001. ISBN 9972-40-153-3
