= Isaac Alzamora =

Vice President of Peru

Isaac Alzamora was the first Vice President of Peru from 1899 to 1903. He also served from 1888 to 1889 as the foreign minister of Peru.

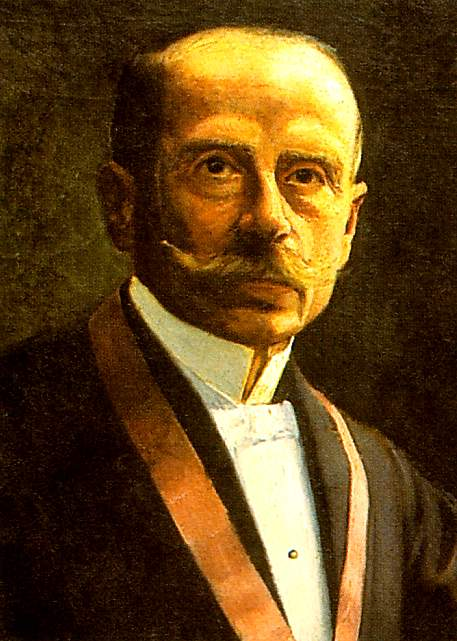
Isaac Alzamora

== Early life ==
He was born on 3 June 1850 in Lima, Peru to José María Alzamoro and Josefa Mayo. He studied at the College of Our Lady of Guadalupe and graduated in 1866. Later he entered the University of San Marcos and obtained a doctorate in jurisprudence.

He then served as the professor of various departments of the university, including political economy, although he started as a professor of logic and psychology in 1872. He also served as the deputy dean of the political economy department.

== Political career ==
Alzamora was elected as a deputy from the constituency of Lima in 1881, and served until 1883.

He was appointed as the foreign minister of Peru in 1888 and served until 1889. Then he was re-elected as a deputy, from the constituency of Chancay on two occasions: in 1889 and 1892.

Alzamora successfully sought the vice presidency in 1899 and completed a four-year term which ended in 1903. He wanted to become a presidential candidate in 1903, but he failed to do so. In 1904, he was elected as the head of Civilista Party. In the same year, he resigned from the post. Alzamora's action was deemed as the renunciation of presidential ambitions.

== Later life and death ==
Alzamora visited New York in 1905, and settled there permanently. However, in 1919, he served as minister plenipotentiary to England and resigned when Augusto Leguía orchestrated a military coup.

He died in 1930 in New York.
