= Ministry of Economy and Finance (Peru) =

Government ministry of Peru

Minister of Economy and Finance
- Ministerio de Economía y Finanzas
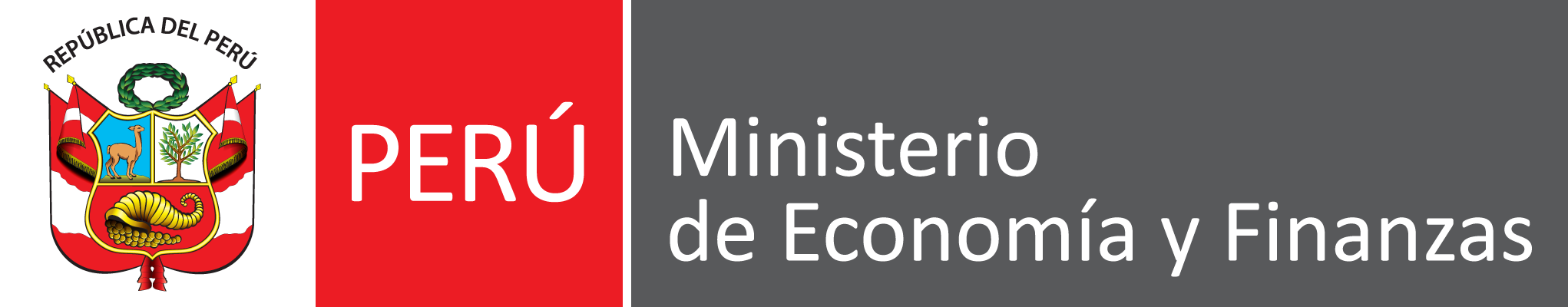

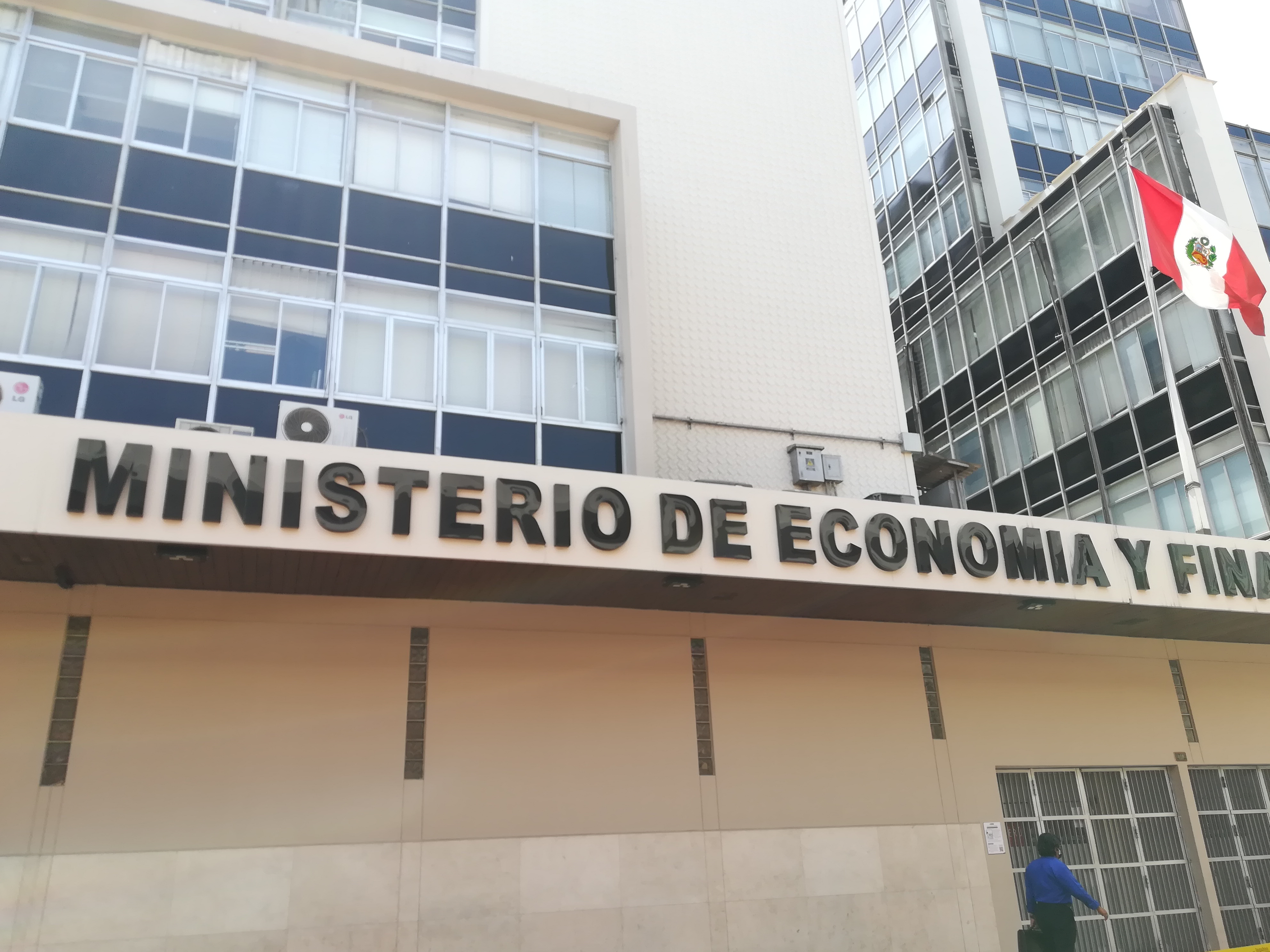

Agency overview
- Formed: February 28, 1823
- Type: Ministry
- Jurisdiction: Peru
- Headquarters: Jirón Junín 319, Lima, Peru
- Agency executive: Elmer Cuba, Minister of Economy and Finance
- Website: Official website

The Ministry of Economy and Finance (Spanish: Ministerio de Economía y Finanzas, MEF) of Peru is the government ministry responsible for the planning and execution of economic policies of the Peruvian government with the goal of optimizing the economic and financial activities of the state, establish macroeconomic activity, and achieve the sustainable growth of the nation's economy.

The current Minister of Economy and Finance is Rodolfo Acuña Namihas, serving since March 17, 2026

== History ==
On August 13, 1821, José de San Martín, president of Peru, created the General Secretariat of Finance along with the Chancellery, and the War and Navy Department. The first minister of Finance was Hipólito Unanue. On March 21, 1824, Simón Bolívar issued a decree in Trujillo reducing the three ministries to a single one, which would become the General Secretariat of Affairs of the Peruvian Republic (Secretaría General de los Negocios de la República Peruana), under Colonel José Gabriel Pérez. However, shortly thereafter, the Governing Junta repealed the decree, reestablishing the three ministries.

On March 2, 1969 the fundamental law of the Ministry of Finance, Law Decree Nº 17521, which gave the basis for the structure and function of the Ministry of Finance and on June 13, 1969 its name was changed to the current Ministry of Economy and Finance.

By the Law Decree Nº 23123 of July 9, 1980, the name of the ministry was changed again to the Ministry of the Economy Finance and Commerce and it was incorporated into the State Department of Commerce which belonged to the Ministry of Industry, Commerce, Tourism, and Integration. On January 30, 1985 the name was changed back to what it is today.

== Organisation ==
- Dependent on the Vice Minister of Finance:
  - Directorate-General of Public Budget: Director of the National Public Budget Administrative System, with technical and regulatory authority at the national level, responsible for programming, directing, coordinating, controlling, and evaluating the management of the public sector budget process. It reports directly to the Deputy Minister of Finance.
  - Directorate-General of Public Accounting: The governing body of the National Administrative Accounting System, with technical and regulatory authority at the national level, responsible for issuing standards and establishing procedures related to its scope and ensuring their proper application, as well as preparing the General Accounting of the Republic and fiscal statistics. It reports directly to the Deputy Minister of Finance.
  - Directorate-General of Public Debt and Treasury: Director of the National Public Debt Administration System and the National Treasury Administration System, with technical and regulatory authority at the national level; responsible for proposing policies and designing standards and procedures for the integrated management of financial assets and liabilities, including the regulation of the handling of public funds and public debt.
  - Directorate-General of Public Resources Management: Responsible for conducting fiscal and financial analyses of proposed measures related to public sector remuneration and social security, and for formulating and proposing public policies on procurement, payroll management, and non-financial asset management, with the aim of promoting improved public management, in coordination with relevant public entities and in accordance with current regulations.
- Dependent on the Vice Minister of Economy:
  - Directorate-General of Macroeconomic Policy: Responsible for directing and coordinating the process of formulating the Multiannual Macroeconomic Framework.
  - Directorate-General of Public Revenue Policy: Responsible for evaluating, formulating, and proposing tax policy to simplify, restructure, and optimize the tax system and improve revenue collection at different levels of government; and for non-tax public revenue policy from the exploitation of natural resources and taxes allocated to regional and local governments.
  - Directorate-General of Public Investment: Responsible for designing policy guidelines for public investment. It also oversees the National Public Investment System (SNIP).
  - Directorate-General for Fiscal Decentralization and Social Affairs: Responsible for formulating and proposing policy, regulations, and other regulatory instruments, within its jurisdiction, related to fiscal decentralization within the framework of macroeconomic policy.
  - Directorate-General for the Development of Private Financial, Labor, and Social Security Markets: Responsible for proposing, directing, and formulating, within its scope of competence, measures to promote policies for the development of private financial, labor, and social security markets.
  - Directorate-General for International Economic Affairs, Competition and Productivity: Responsible for proposing, directing and formulating policy measures within its sphere of competence in the areas of foreign trade, competition and regulatory quality, as well as ensuring the consistency of economic integration processes with general economic policy.

Entities administered by the ministry include:

- Agencia de Promoción de la Inversión Privada (PROINVERSIÓN)
- Organismo Supervisor de las Contrataciones del Estado (OSCE)
- Superintendencia del Mercado de Valores (SMV)
- Superintendencia Nacional de Aduanas y de Administración Tributaria (SUNAT)
- Fondo Nacional de Financiamiento de la Actividad Empresarial del Estado (FONAFE)
- Banco de la Nación (BN)
- Oficina de Normalización Previsional (ONP)

== List of ministers ==
Name	Party	Period	
Name	Party	Term start	Term end
Ministers of Finance and Trade (1821–1969)
Hipólito Unanue	—N/a	August 3, 1821	
Dionisio Vizcarra	—N/a	June 23, 1823	
Hipólito Unanue	—N/a	September 24, 1823	
José de Espinar	—N/a	February 19, 1824	
José Faustino Sánchez Carrión	—N/a	April 1, 1824	
Hipólito Unanue	—N/a	October 28, 1824	
José María Pando de la Riva	—N/a	March 8, 1825	
Juan Salazar	—N/a	May 20, 1835	
José de Larrea y Loredo	—N/a	July 20, 1825	
José María Pando de la Riva	—N/a	May 8, 1826	
José de Larrea y Loredo	—N/a	July 28, 1826	
José María Galdeano y Mendoza	—N/a	February 10, 1827	
José de Morales y Ugalde	—N/a	February 12, 1827	
Francisco Javier Mariátegui y Tellería	—N/a	June 24, 1827	
Manuel Gaspar de Rosas	—N/a	June 10, 1828	
José Gregorio Paredes	—N/a	June 20, 1828	
Dionisio Vizcarra	—N/a		
Lorenzo Bazo	—N/a	June 6, 1829	
José de Larrea y Loredo	—N/a	December 1, 1829	
Manuel del Río	—N/a	June 20, 1830	
José María Pando de la Riva	—N/a	July 21, 1830	
Manuel Pérez de Tudela	—N/a	December 20, 1831	
Manuel Gaspar de Rosas	—N/a	October 29, 1832	
Manuel del Río	—N/a	November 12, 1832	
Joaquín de Arrece	—N/a	November 22, 1832	
Andrés Martínez de Orihuela	—N/a	January 3, 1833	
José Villa	—N/a	December 21, 1833	
Andrés Martínez de Orihuela	—N/a	January 4, 1834	
José Villa	—N/a	January 24, 1834	
Ildefonso Zavala	—N/a	March 1, 1834	
José de Mendiburú	—N/a	March 29, 1834	
José Villa	—N/a	May 6, 1834	
José de Mendiburú	—N/a	July 5, 1834	
Ildefonso Zavala	—N/a	October 22, 1834	
José de Mendiburú	—N/a	February 25, 1835	
Domingo Espinar	—N/a	February 27, 1835	
Bonifacio de Lazarte	—N/a	April 13, 1835	
José de Mendiburú	—N/a	May 20, 1835	
José Braulio del Camporredondo	—N/a	July 16, 1835	
Joaquín de Arrece	—N/a	September 12, 1835	
Andrés Martínez (Secretary-General)	—N/a	October 9, 1835	
Mariano de Sierra	—N/a	January 9, 1836	
Juan García del Río	—N/a	April 25, 1836	
Pío de Tristán	—N/a	August 6, 1836	
Juan García del Río	—N/a	August 17, 1836	
José Gregorio Paredes	—N/a	January 31, 1837	
José María Galdeano	—N/a	May 2, 1837	
Casimiro Olañeta	—N/a	August 17, 1837	
Juan García del Río	—N/a	November 3, 1837	
Manuel del Río	—N/a	July 30, 1838	
Benito Laso de la Vega	—N/a	August 1, 1838	
Manuel Ferreyros (did not take office)	—N/a	August 24, 1838	August 24, 1838
José de Mendiburú	—N/a	August 24, 1838	
Lorenzo Bazo	—N/a	November 8, 1838	
Ramón Castilla (interim)	—N/a	March 3, 1839	
Manuel Ferreyros	—N/a	July 29, 1839	
Manuel del Río	—N/a	January 3, 1841	
Luciano María Cano	—N/a	March 16, 1841	
José de Mendiburú	—N/a	July 30, 1841	
Miguel del Carpio y Melgar	—N/a	August 16, 1842	
Francisco Javier Mariátegui y Tellería	—N/a	October 31, 1842	
José Luis Goméz Sánchez	—N/a	March 20, 1843	
Pedro Antonio de la Torre	—N/a	May 1, 1843	
Manuel Toribio Ureta	—N/a	July 22, 1843	
Andrés Martínez de Orihuela	—N/a	August 5, 1843	
Pedro Gamio	—N/a	January 5, 1844	
Andrés Martínez de Orihuela	—N/a	May 20, 1844	
José Manuel Tirado	—N/a	June 17, 1844	
Domingo Elías	—N/a	August 11, 1844	
Manuel de Mendiburu	—N/a	April 21, 1846	
José Fabio Melgar Valdivieso	—N/a	July 16, 1849	
Juan Crisóstomo Torrico (Minister-General)	—N/a	April 20, 1851	
Manuel de Mendiburu	—N/a	August 29, 1851	
Nicolás Fernández de Piérola y Flores	—N/a	September 7, 1852	
Manuel de Mendiburu	—N/a	January 2, 1854	
Pedro Gálvez Egúsquiza	—N/a	November 7, 1854	
Manuel Toribio Ureta	—N/a	January 5, 1855	
Domingo Elías	—N/a	February 1, 1855	
José Santos Castañeda	—N/a	October 16, 1856	
Francisco de Rivero	—N/a	February 14, 1857	
Manuel Ortíz de Zevallos	—N/a	October 24, 1857	
Juan José Salcedo	—N/a	December 16, 1858	
José Fabio Melgar Valdivieso	—N/a	July 25, 1861	
Pedro Gálvez Egúsquiza	—N/a	June 25, 1862	
José Santos Castañeda	—N/a	October 27, 1862	
Ignacio Novoa	—N/a	April 10, 1863; August 5, 1863	August 5, 1863
Julián de Zaracondegui	—N/a	August 11, 1864	
Felipe Barriga Alvarez	—N/a	September 5, 1864	
Pedro Mariano García	—N/a	October 14, 1864	
José García Urrutia	—N/a	November 23, 1864	
Pedro José Carrillo	—N/a	April 4, 1865	
José Jorge Loayza	—N/a	July 14, 1865	
José Manuel de la Puente	—N/a	November 10, 1865	
Tomás de Vivero	—N/a	November 16, 1865	
Manuel Pardo	—N/a	November 28, 1865	
José Narciso de Campos	—N/a	March 2, 1867	
Pedro Paz-Soldán Ureta	—N/a	June 3, 1867	
Juan Manuel Solar	—N/a	January 7, 1868	
José Luis Gómez Sánchez	—N/a	January 26, 1868	
Juan Ignacio Elguera	—N/a	April 3, 1868	
Francisco García Calderón	—N/a	August 4, 1868	
Nicolás de Piérola	—N/a	January 5, 1869	
Manuel Angulo	—N/a	October 26, 1869	
Nicolás de Piérola	—N/a	February 26, 1870	
Camilo Carrillo	—N/a	July 21, 1871	
Felipe Masías	—N/a	September 20, 1871	
José de la Riva-Agüero y Looz-Corswarem	Civil Party	July 27, 1872	
José María de la Jara y Alvizuri	—N/a	August 3, 1872	
Camilo Carrillo	Civil Party	November 7, 1873	
Juan Ignacio Elguera	—N/a	May 26, 1874	
José de Araníbar	—N/a	August 2, 1876	
José Felix García	—N/a	June 8, 1877	
Manuel Antonio Barinaga	—N/a	July 19, 1878	
José Rafael de Iscue	—N/a	October 25, 1878	
Emilio A. del Solar	—N/a	July 15, 1879	
José María Químper	—N/a	July 24, 1879	
Juan Francisco Pazos Monasí	—N/a	September 5, 1879	
Aurelio Denegri	Civil Party	October 29, 1879	
José María Químper	—N/a	November 1, 1879	
Manuel Antonio Barinaga (Secretary)	—N/a	December 24, 1879	
Aurelio García y García (Secretary-General)	—N/a	January 16, 1881	
Aurelio Denegri	—N/a	March 12, 1881	
Manuel María Rivas Pereira	—N/a	January 4, 1882	
Juan Francisco Oviedo	—N/a	September 4, 1882	
Ladislao de la Jara	—N/a	April 1883	
Lorenzo Iglesias (Minister-General)	—N/a	January 3, 1883	
Elías Malpartida	—N/a	September 15, 1883	
Manuel Galup	—N/a	November 20, 1883	
Pedro Correa y Santiago	—N/a	December 3, 1885	
Luis Bryce y Vivero	—N/a	June 3, 1886	
José de Araníbar	—N/a	October 6, 1886	
Manuel Yrigoyen Arias	Constitutional Party	November 22, 1886	
Mariano Santos Álvarez Villegas	—N/a	August 22, 1887	
Antero Aspíllaga	Civil Party	November 9, 1887	
Eulogio Delgado	—N/a	March 8, 1889	
Ismael de la Quintana	—N/a	August 10, 1890	
Manuel Carbajal	—N/a	August 24, 1891	
Rafael Quiróz	—N/a	July 1, 1892	
José Salvador Cavero Ovalle	Constitutional Party	March 3, 1893	
Eugenio Marquesado	—N/a	May 12, 1893	
Agustín de la Torre González	—N/a	September 28, 1893	
Melitón Carvajal	—N/a	January 30, 1894	
José Agustín de la Puente	—N/a	April 2, 1894	
Horacio Ferreccio	—N/a	June 18, 1894	
Nicanor Carmona	Constitutional Party	August 11, 1894	
Elías Malpartida	Democratic Party	March 20, 1895	
Federico Bresani del Villar	—N/a	September 9, 1895	
Manuel Jesús Obín	Democratic Party	November 30, 1895	
Ignacio Rey	—N/a	August 10, 1896	
Mariano A. Belaunde	Democratic Party	September 8, 1899	
Rafael Quiróz	—N/a	August 8, 1900	
José V. Larrabure	—N/a	August 31, 1900	
Domingo M. Almenara Butler	Civil Party	October 2, 1900	
Adrián Ward	—N/a	September 12, 1901	
Juan José Reinoso	—N/a	August 9, 1902	
Pablo Sarria	—N/a	November 4, 1902	
Augusto B. Leguía	Civil Party	September 8, 1903; April 18, 1904	April 18, 1904
Juan José Reinoso	—N/a	May 15, 1904	
Augusto B. Leguía	Civil Party	September 24, 1904	
Germán Schreiber Waddington	Civil Party	August 2, 1907	
Eulogio Romero Salcedo	—N/a	September 24, 1908	
Agustín de la Torre González	—N/a	June 8, 1909	
Carlos Forero	Democratic Party	November 3, 1909	
Severiano Bezada	Civil Party	January 3, 1910	
Germán Schreiber Waddington	Civil Party	March 14, 1910	
Enrique Oyanguren	—N/a	November 3, 1910	
Daniel Castillo	—N/a	September 1, 1911	
Ernesto L. Raez	—N/a	October 17, 1911	
Flavio A. Castañeda	—N/a	August 16, 1912	
Baldomero F. Maldonado	—N/a	September 24, 1912	
Felipe Derteano	—N/a	February 25, 1913	
José Balta Paz	Liberal Party	June 17, 1913	
Baldomero F. Maldonado	—N/a	July 27, 1913	
Armando José Vélez Mendoza	—N/a	December 23, 1913	
José Balta Paz	Liberal Party	February 4, 1914	
Luis Felipe Villarán Godoy	Civil Party	May 15, 1914	
Francisco Tudela y Varela	Civil Party	August 22, 1914	
Aurelio Sousa Matute	—N/a	September 22, 1914	
Germán Schreiber Waddington	Civil Party	November 11, 1914	
Enrigue Oyanguren	—N/a	February 18, 1915	
Aurelio García y Lastres	—N/a	August 18, 1915	
Baldomero F. Maldonado	—N/a	July 27, 1917	
Germán Arenas y Loayza	—N/a	February 26, 1918	
Víctor Manuel Maúrtua	—N/a	April 22, 1918	
Héctor Escardó	—N/a	December 18, 1918	
Ismael de Idiáquez	—N/a	July 4, 1919	
Fernando Fuchs	—N/a	August 12, 1919	
M. A. Rodriguez Dulanto	—N/a	March 7, 1919	
Marcial Pastor	—N/a	May 5, 1924	
Enrique de la Piedra	—N/a	October 12, 1924	
Benjamín Huamán de los Heros	—N/a	June 19, 1925	
Manuel Gregorio Masías	—N/a	September 24, 1925	
Fernando Fuchs	—N/a	August 1, 1930	
Ricardo E. Llona	—N/a	August 25, 1930	
Manuel Augusto Olaechea	—N/a	November 2, 1930	
Pedro Bustamante y Santisteban	—N/a	January 31, 1931	
Gerardo Balbuena Carrillo	—N/a	February 24, 1931	
Manuel A. Vinelli	—N/a	March 11, 1931	
Emilio L. Gómez de la Torre	—N/a	July 23, 1931	
José G. Cateriano	—N/a	December 8, 1931	
Francisco Lanatta	—N/a	January 29, 1932	
Ignacio Brandariz	—N/a	April 13, 1932; April 30, 1933	April 30, 1933
Alfredo Solf y Muro	—N/a	June 29, 1933	
Benjamín Roca García	—N/a	November 25, 1933	
Teófilo Iglesias Rodríguez	—N/a	October 24, 1936	
Fernando Tola Cires	—N/a	May 21, 1935	
Manuel Ugarteche Jiménez	—N/a	October 1935	
Teófilo Iglesias Rodríguez	—N/a	October 23, 1936	
Benjamín Roca García	—N/a	October 28, 1937	
Manuel Ugarteche Jiménez	—N/a	December 1, 1938	
Óscar Ramos Cabieses	—N/a	December 8, 1939	
David Dasso	—N/a	April 6, 1940	
Julio East	—N/a	August 24, 1942	
Rómulo Ferrero Rebagliati	—N/a	July 28, 1945	
Carlos Montero Bernales	—N/a	October 1, 1945	
Manuel Vásquez Díaz	—N/a	January 29, 1946	
Luis Echecopar García	—N/a	January 13, 1947	
Roque Augusto Saldías Maninat	—N/a	February 27, 1948	
Manuel Llosa	—N/a	July 1948	
Rómulo Ferrero Rebagliati	—N/a	September 17, 1948	
Luis Ramírez Ortíz	—N/a	October 27, 1948	
Emilio Pereyra Marquina	—N/a	October 27, 1949	
Andrés F. Dasso	—N/a	July 28, 1950	
Emilio Romero Padilla	—N/a	September 1, 1952	
Emilio Guimoye	—N/a	February 2, 1954	
Jaime Miranda Sousa	—N/a	December 9, 1955	
Roque Augusto Saldías Maninat	—N/a	December 24, 1955	
Juan Pardo Heeren	—N/a	July 1956	
Augusto Thorndike Galup	—N/a	January 10, 1958	
Luis Gallo Porras	Peruvian Democratic Movement	June 10, 1958	
Pedro Beltrán Espantoso	—N/a	September 1959	
Alex Zarak	—N/a	April 26, 1961	
Augusto Valdéz Oviedo	—N/a	July 17, 1962	
Javier Salazar Villanueva	—N/a	July 28, 1963	
Carlos Morales Macchiavello	—N/a	September 1964	
Sandro Mariátegui Chiappe	Popular Action	September 15, 1965	
Tulio de Andrea Marcazzolo	—N/a	September 8, 1967	
Raúl Ferrero Rebagliati	—N/a	January 29, 1968	
Francisco Morales-Bermúdez	—N/a	March 20, 1968	
Manuel Ulloa Elías	Popular Action	June 1, 1968	
Angel Valdivia Morriberón	—N/a	October 3, 1968	
Francisco Morales-Bermúdez	—N/a	March 3, 1969	June 13, 1969
Ministers of Economy and Finance
Francisco Morales-Bermúdez	—N/a	June 13, 1969	January 2, 1974
Guillermo Marcó del Pont	—N/a	January 2, 1974	July 18, 1974
Amílcar Vargas Gavilano	—N/a	July 18, 1974	August 30, 1975
Luis Barúa Castañeda	—N/a	September 2, 1975	May 16, 1977
Walter Piazza Tangüis	—N/a	May 16, 1977	July 6, 1977
Alcibíades Sáenz Barsallo	—N/a	July 6, 1977	May 15, 1978
Javier Silva Ruete	—N/a	May 15, 1978	July 28, 1980
Manuel Ulloa Elías	Popular Action	July 28, 1980	January 3, 1983
Carlos Rodríguez-Pastor Mendoza	—N/a	January 3, 1983	March 21, 1984
José Benavides Muñoz	Popular Action	March 21, 1984	January 29, 1985
Guillermo Garrido-Lecca Álvarez-Calderón	—N/a	January 29, 1985	July 28, 1985
Luis Alva Castro	APRA	July 28, 1985	July 28, 1987
Gustavo Saberbein Chevalier	—N/a	July 28, 1987	May 16, 1988
César Robles Freyre	APRA	May 16, 1988	September 2, 1988
Abel Salinas Izaguirre	APRA	September 2, 1988	November 28, 1988
Carlos Rivas Dávila	APRA	November 28, 1988	May 15, 1989
César Vásquez Bazán	—N/a	May 15, 1989	July 28, 1990
Juan Carlos Hurtado Miller	Popular Action	July 28, 1990	February 15, 1991
Carlos Boloña Behr	—N/a	February 15, 1991	January 8, 1993
Jorge Camet Dickmann	—N/a	January 9, 1993	June 6, 1998
Jorge Baca Campodónico	—N/a	June 6, 1998	January 4, 1999
Víctor Joy Way	Cambio 90	January 5, 1999	October 13, 1999
Efraín Goldenberg	Cambio 90	October 15, 1999	July 28, 2000
Carlos Boloña Behr	—N/a	July 28, 2000	November 25, 2000
Javier Silva Ruete	Somos Perú	November 25, 2000	July 28, 2001
Pedro Pablo Kuczynski	—N/a	July 28, 2001	July 11, 2002
Javier Silva Ruete	—N/a	July 12, 2002	July 25, 2003
Jaime Quijandría Salmón	—N/a	July 25, 2003	February 16, 2004
Pedro Pablo Kuczynski	—N/a	February 16, 2004	August 16, 2005
Fernando Zavala Lombardi	—N/a	August 16, 2005	July 28, 2006
Luis Carranza Ugarte	—N/a	July 28, 2006	July 14, 2008
Luis Valdivieso Montano	—N/a	July 14, 2008	January 19, 2009
Luis Carranza Ugarte	—N/a	January 19, 2009	December 22, 2009
Mercedes Aráoz Fernández	APRA	December 22, 2009	September 12, 2010
Ismael Benavides Ferreyros	—N/a	September 14, 2010	July 28, 2011
Luis Miguel Castilla Rubio	—N/a	July 28, 2011	September 14, 2014
Alonso Segura Vasi	—N/a	September 14, 2014	July 28, 2016
Alfredo Thorne Vetter	Peruanos Por El Kambio	July 28, 2016	June 22, 2017
Fernando Zavala Lombardi	—N/a	June 23, 2017	September 17, 2017
Claudia Cooper Fort	—N/a	September 17, 2017	April 2, 2018
David Tuesta Cárdenas	—N/a	April 2, 2018	June 4, 2018
Carlos Oliva Neyra	—N/a	June 7, 2018	September 30, 2019
María Antonieta Alva Luperdi	—N/a	October 3, 2019	November 9, 2020
José Arista Arbildo	Alianza Regional Juntos por Amazonas	November 12, 2020	November 17, 2020
Waldo Mendoza Bellido	—N/a	November 18, 2020	July 29, 2021
Pedro Francke Ballvé	Nuevo Perú	July 30, 2021	February 1, 2022
Óscar Graham Yamaguchi	—N/a	February 1, 2022	August 6, 2022
Kurt Burneo Farfán	—N/a	August 6, 2022	December 7, 2022
Alex Contreras Miranda	—N/a	December 10, 2022	February 13, 2024
José Arista Arbildo	—N/a	February 13, 2024	January 31, 2025
José Salardi Rodríguez	—N/a	January 31, 2025	May 13, 2025
Raúl Pérez-Reyes	—N/a	May 13, 2025	October 10, 2025
Denisse Miralles	—N/a	October 10, 2025	February 24, 2026
Gerardo López Gonzales	—N/a	February 24, 2026	March 17, 2026
Rodolfo Acuña Namihas	—N/a	March 17, 2026	July 28, 2026
Elmer Cuba	All for Peru	July 28, 2026	Incumbent

== See also ==
- Council of Ministers of Peru
- Government of Peru
