= Germán Schreiber Waddington =

Peruvian politician of Austrian descent

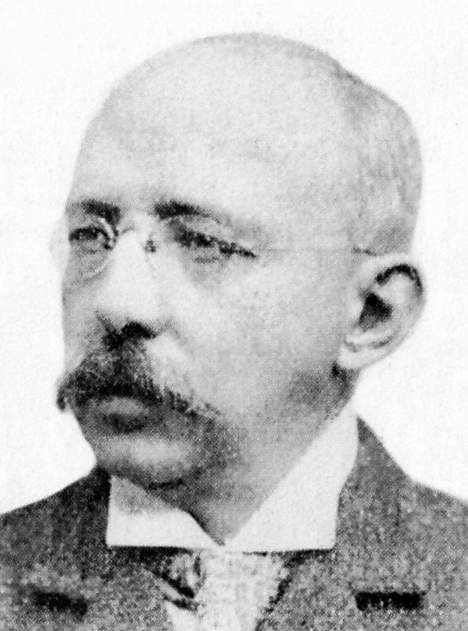

Germán Schreiber Waddington (1862 – August 16, 1930) was a Peruvian politician of Austrian descent. He was a member of the Civilista Party. He served in the Chamber of Deputies of Peru (1904–1908) and Senate of Peru. He served as Minister of Finance (1907–1908, 1910, 1914–1915) in the Government of Peru. He was twice Prime Minister of Peru (August–November 1910, November 1914 – February 1915). His father Aloys Schreiber was a consular agent of Austria in Huaraz, Ancash.

Preceded by Javier Prado y Ugarteche	Prime Minister of Peru; August 3–November 3, 1910	Succeeded by José Salvador Cavero Ovalle
Preceded by Aurelio Sousa Matute	Prime Minister of Peru; November 11, 1914 – February 18, 1915	Succeeded by Carlos Isaac Abril Galindo

== Bibliography ==
- Basadre Grohmann, Jorge: Historia de la República del Perú (1822–1933), Tomo 12. Editada por la Empresa Editora El Comercio S. A. Lima, 2005. ISBN 9972-205-74-6 (V.12)
- Tauro del Pino, Alberto: Enciclopedia Ilustrada del Perú. Tercera Edición. Tomo 15, SAL/SZY. Lima, PEISA, 2001. ISBN 9972-40-164-2
