= Rodolfo Acuña Namihas =

Minister of Economy and Finance
- In office 17 March 2026 – 28 July 2026
- Preceded by: Gerardo López Gonzales
- Succeeded by: Elmer Cuba

Personal details
- Born: Rodolfo Acuña Namihas; 20 February 1957 (age 69) Lima, Peru
- Education: Ricardo Palma University

Rodolfo Acuña Namihas (Note: In this Hispanic American name, the first or paternal surname is Acuña and the second or maternal family name is Namihas.) (born 20 February 1957) is a Peruvian economist and public official. He served as Peru's Minister of Economy and Finance in the government of José María Balcázar from March 2026 until July 2026.

Acuña Namihas graduated from the Universidad Ricardo Palma in Lima with a degree in economics in 1993 and also holds master's degrees from Spain's National University of Distance Education and Lima's Universidad San Ignacio de Loyola. As an academic, he has taught at the Universidad del Pacífico, the Pontificia Universidad Católica del Perú, the Universidad de Lima, the Universidad Nacional Mayor de San Marcos and the Universidad César Vallejo, primarily on issues of economics and governance.
