= Carlos Oliva (economist) =

Peruvian economist and politician (1964–2026)

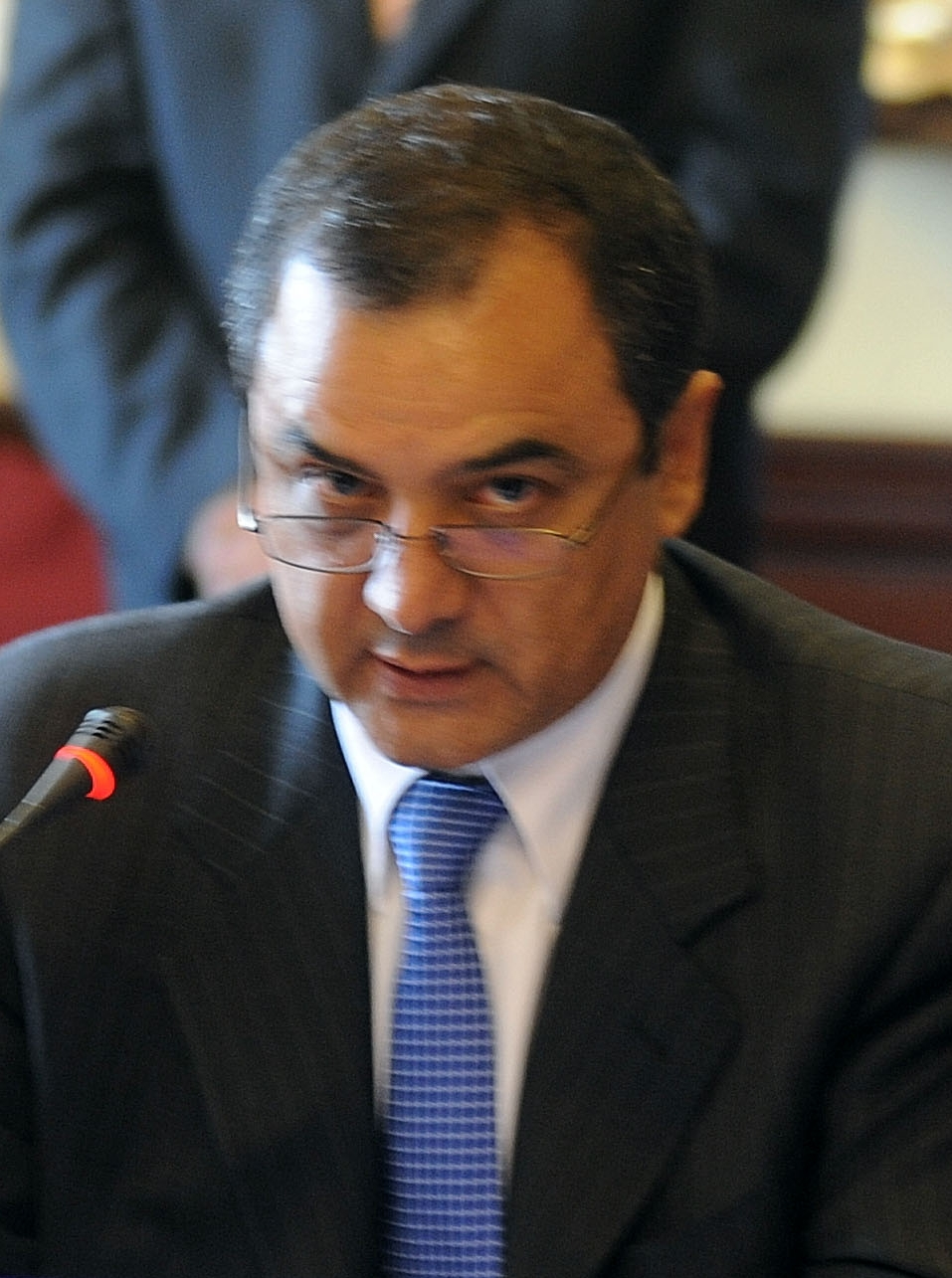

President of the Central Reserve Bank of Peru
- In office 18 November 2021 – 27 May 2026

Minister of Economy and Finance of Peru
- In office 7 June 2018 – 30 September 2019
- President: Martin Vizcarra
- Preceded by: David Tuesta
- Succeeded by: María Antonieta Alva

Personal details
- Born: Carlos Augusto Oliva Neyra; 16 December 1964 Lima, Peru
- Died: 27 May 2026 (aged 61)
- Education: Universidad del Pacífico (BA)

Carlos Augusto Oliva Neyra (16 December 1964 – 27 May 2026) was a Peruvian economist.

== Life and career ==
Carlos Augusto Oliva Neyra was born on 16 December 1964. He served as the Minister of Economy and Finance from 7 June 2018 to 30 September 2019. He was the Director of the Central Reserve Bank from 2015 to 2016, and again from 2021 until his death. He was also president of the Fiscal Council of Peru between 2020 and 2024.

Oliva died on 27 May 2026, at the age of 61.
