= List of ambassadors of Peru to the United Kingdom =

Ambassador of Peru to the United Kingdom
- Great Seal of Peru
- Ministry of Foreign Affairs; 15 Buckingham Gate, London
- Style: His Excellency (formal)
- Residence: 34 Porchester Terrace, London, England
- Appointer: The president of Peru
- Inaugural holder: Juan García del Río; James Paroissien
- Formation: 1822
- Website: Embassy of Peru in the United Kingdom

The extraordinary and plenipotentiary ambassador of Peru to the United Kingdom of Great Britain and Northern Ireland is the official representative of the Republic of Peru to the United Kingdom.

The ambassador acts concurrently as the Peruvian representative to the International Maritime Organization and the International Whaling Commission, both also based in England.

Relations between both countries began almost immediately after Peruvian independence. The United Kingdom already had contributed to the South American efforts on the Patriot side and a diplomatic mission to the United Kingdom was ordered by José de San Martín in 1822, with the first British representative to Peru, Thomas Rowcroft, arriving to Callao aboard HMS Cambridge the following year.

In the 1830s, over 50% of all imports to Peru came from the United Kingdom. Prominent British companies in Peru at the time included the Compañía Peruana de Ferrocarriles, the Pacific Steam Navigation Company and Antony Gibbs & Sons. Between 1860 and 1950, some 1900 Brits had established themselves in Peru.

== List of representatives ==
Name	Portrait	Term begin	Term end	President	Notes
Juan García del Río; James Paroissien		1822	1825	José de San Martín	Sent as plenipotentiary ministers to negotiate a British recognition of Peru.
José Gregorio Paredes		1825	1828	Simón Bolívar	Chargé d'affaires / Minister plenipotentiary
Juan Manuel Iturregui Aguilarte		1828	1837	José de La Mar	Chargé d'Affaires
Lorenzo Bazo Villanueva		1837	1841	Andrés de Santa Cruz	Minister plenipotentiary of the Peru–Bolivian Confederation
Agustín Guillermo Charún		1841	1845	Agustín Gamarra	Minister plenipotentiary
Juan Manuel Iturregui Aguilarte		1845	1848	Ramón Castilla	Minister plenipotentiary
Joaquín José de Osma y Ramírez de Arellano		1847	1850	Ramón Castilla	Minister plenipotentiary
Francisco del Rivero		1848	1852	Ramón Castilla	Chargé d'Affaires
Manuel de Mendiburu		1852	1854	José Rufino Echenique	Minister plenipotentiary
José Antonio Rodulfo		1854	1855	José Rufino Echenique	Chargé d'Affaires
Francisco de Rivero		1855	1858	José Rufino Echenique	Resident minister
Ignacio de Osma		1858	1862	Ramón Castilla	Minister plenipotentiary
Mariano José Sanz León		1862	1864	Ramón Castilla	Minister plenipotentiary
Federico L. Barreda		1864	1866	Juan Antonio Pezet	Minister plenipotentiary
Francisco de Rivero		1866	1868	Mariano Ignacio Prado	Minister plenipotentiary
Manuel Natividad Porturas Mendoza		1868	1872	José Balta	Minister plenipotentiary
Pedro Gálvez Egúsquiza		1869	1875	José Balta	Minister plenipotentiary
Mariano Ignacio Prado		1874	1876	Manuel Pardo	Minister plenipotentiary
Carlos Pividal		1879	1880	Mariano Ignacio Prado	Resident minister
Toribio Sanz y Saénz de Tejada		1880	1883	Nicolás de Piérola	Minister plenipotentiary
Aurelio García y García		1883	1884	Miguel Iglesias	Minister plenipotentiary
José Rafael de Izcue		1884	1886	Miguel Iglesias	Minister plenipotentiary
Carlos de Candamo		1886	1890	Andrés Avelino Cáceres	Minister plenipotentiary
Andrés Avelino Cáceres		1891	1892	Remigio Morales Bermúdez	Minister plenipotentiary
Wenceslao Meléndez		1892	1894	Remigio Morales Bermúdez	Chargé d'Affaires
José Francisco Canevaro		1894	1900	Andrés Avelino Cáceres	Minister plenipotentiary
Carlos de Candamo		1900	1912	Eduardo López de Romaña	Minister plenipotentiary
Carlos Eduardo Lembcke		1912	1914	Guillermo Billinghurst	Minister plenipotentiary
Edmundo de la Fuente y de las Casas		1914	1919	Óscar R. Benavides	Chargé d'Affaires
Isaac Alzamora		1919	1919	José Pardo y Barreda	Minister plenipotentiary
Germán Cisneros y Raygada		1919	1922	Augusto B. Leguía	Chargé d'Affaires
Agustín Ganoza y Cavero		1922	1926	Augusto B. Leguía	Minister plenipotentiary
Manuel de Freyre y Santander		1926	1930	Augusto B. Leguía	Minister plenipotentiary
Alfredo González Prada		September 19, 1930	1931	Luis Miguel Sánchez Cerro	Minister plenipotentiary
Óscar R. Benavides		February 1932	1932	Luis Miguel Sánchez Cerro	Minister plenipotentiary
Alfredo Benavides Diez-Canseco		1933	1942	Óscar R. Benavides	Minister plenipotentiary
Fernando Berckemeyer Pazos		1944	1945	Manuel Prado Ugarteche	Minister plenipotentiary
Jorge Prado Ugarteche		1945		Manuel Prado Ugarteche	Minister plenipotentiary
Fernando Berckemeyer Pazos		1947	1948	José Luis Bustamante y Rivero	Ambassador
Ricardo Rivera Schreiber		1949	1952	Manuel A. Odría	Ambassador, KBE
Alberto Freundt Rosell		1952	1954	Manuel A. Odría	Ambassador
Ricardo Rivera Schreiber		1954	1963	Manuel A. Odría	Ambassador
Gonzalo N. de Arámburu		1963	1969	Manuel Prado Ugarteche	Ambassador
Adhemar Montagne		1969	1972	Juan Velasco Alvarado	Ambassador
Gonzalo Fernández Puyó		1978	1980	Francisco Morales Bermúdez	Ambassador
Armando Lecaros de Cossío		1981	1983	Fernando Belaúnde	Chargé d'Affaires
Andrés Aramburú Menchaca		1982	1985	Fernando Belaúnde	Ambassador
Julio Vega Erausquin		1985	1986	Alan Garcia	Chargé d'Affaires
Carlos Raffo Dasso		1986	1989	Alan García	Ambassador
Felipe Valdivieso Belaúnde		1989	1992	Alan García	Ambassador
Arturo García García		1992	1995	Alberto Fujimori	Ambassador
Eduardo Ponce Vivanco		1995	1999	Alberto Fujimori	Ambassador
Gilbert Chauny de Porturas-Hoyle		2000	2001	Alberto Fujimori	Ambassador
Armando Lecaros de Cossío		2001	2003	Alejandro Toledo	Ambassador
Luis Solari Tudela		2004	2006	Alejandro Toledo	Ambassador
Ricardo Luna Mendoza		2006	2010	Alan García	Ambassador
Hernán Couturier		2010	2012	Alan García	Ambassador
Julio Muñoz Deacon		2012	2015	Ollanta Humala	Ambassador
Claudio de la Puente Ribeyro		2015	2017	Ollanta Humala	Ambassador
Susana de la Puente Wiese		2017	2018	Pedro Pablo Kuczynski	Ambassador
Juan Carlos Gamarra Skeels		October 1, 2018	February 26, 2024	Martín Vizcarra	Ambassador
Ignacio Higueras Hare		May 1, 2024	October 10, 2025	Dina Boluarte	Ambassador

== See also ==
- Embassy of Peru, London
- List of ambassadors of Peru to Ireland
- List of diplomats of the United Kingdom to Peru
