= Superintendencia Nacional de Administración Tributaria =

Customs and tax agency of Peru

National Superintendency of Tax Administration
- Superintendencia Nacional de Administración Tributaria

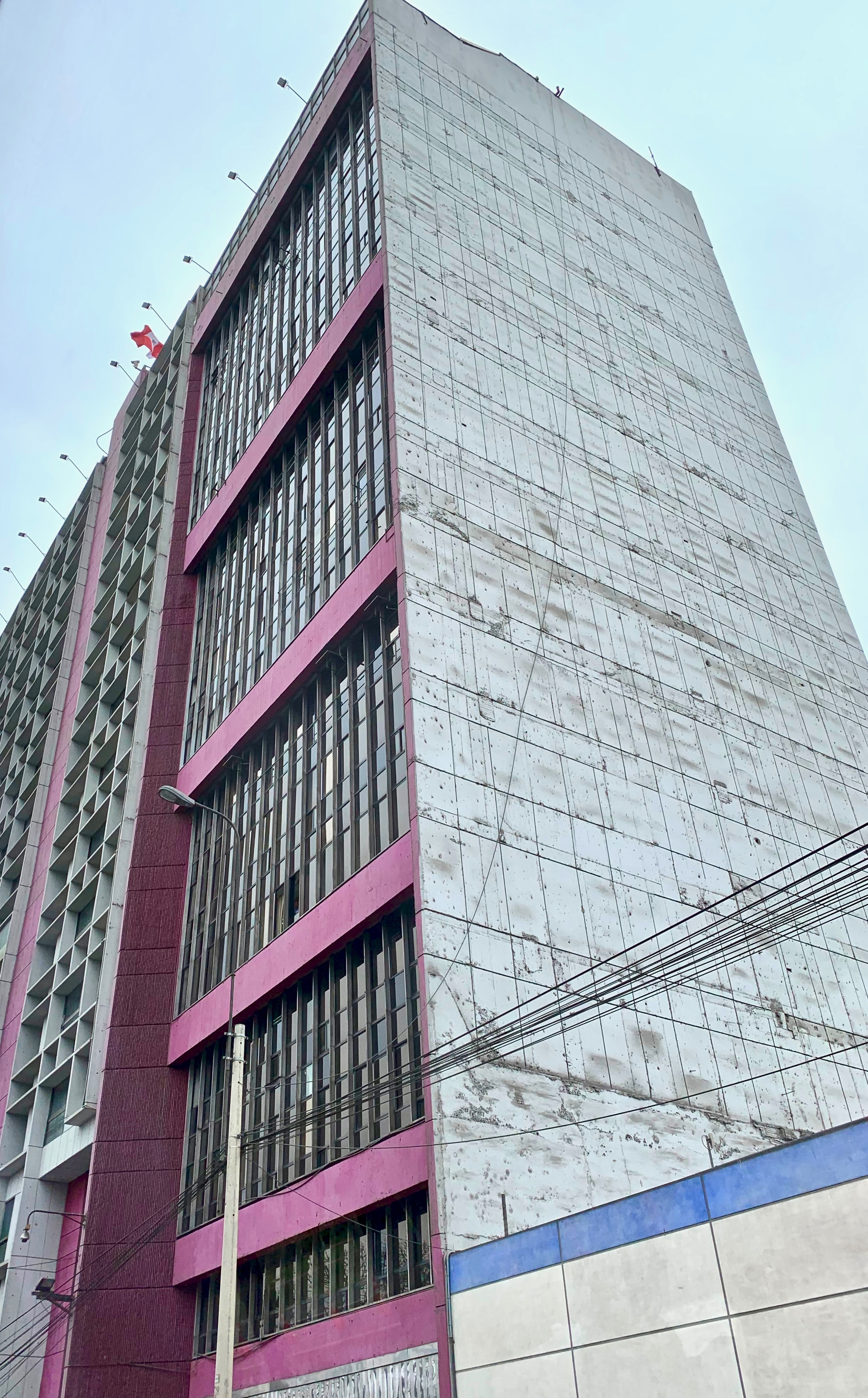
- Headquarters in 2018

Agency overview
- Formed: May 31, 1988; 38 years ago
- Type: Customs service Revenue service
- Jurisdiction: Government of Peru
- Headquarters: Wilson 1472, Lima
- Agency executive: César Alfonso Luna Victoria León, National Superintendent
- Parent agency: Ministry of Economy and Finance
- Website: sunat.gob.pe

The National Superintendency of Tax Administration (Spanish: Superintendencia Nacional de Aduanas y de Administración Tributaria; SUNAT) is the customs and revenue service of the Peruvian government. It is responsible for enforcing customs and taxation in Peru.

According to Law No. 29,816, it is a specialised technical body, attached to the Ministry of Economy and Finance, which has legal personality of public law, with its own assets and enjoys functional, technical, economic, financial, budgetary and administrative autonomy that, by virtue of the provisions of Supreme Decree No. 061-2002-PCM, issued under the provisions of numeral 13.1 of article 13 of Law No. 27658, has absorbed the National Superintendency of Customs, assuming the functions, powers and attributions that by law, corresponded to this entity.

== History ==
It was created on May 31, 1988, by Law No. 24829 (published on June 8, 1988), which established it as a decentralized public institution. With the privatization of some public services during the government of Alberto Fujimori, the institution gained autonomy to obtain income from the business sector.

== Functions and powers of SUNAT ==
The functions and powers of the National Superintendency of Customs and Tax Administration are:

- To administer, collect and audit the internal taxes of the National Government, with the exception of municipal taxes, as well as contributions to the Social Health Insurance (ESSALUD) and the Pension Standardization Office (ONP), and others whose collection is entrusted to it according to law.
- To propose to the Ministry of Economy and Finance the regulation of tax and customs rules.
- To issue, within the scope of its competence, provisions on tax and customs matters, establishing obligations of taxpayers, responsible parties or users of the customs service, to provide measures that lead to the simplification of customs regimes and procedures, as well as to regulate the procedures that derive from these.
- To systematize and organize foreign trade legislation and statistical information in order to provide general information on the subject in accordance with the law, as well as information related to the internal and customs taxes it administers. For this purpose, it is a member of the Advisory Group on Customs Issues.
- To propose to the Executive Branch the tax guidelines for the celebration of international agreements and conventions, as well as to issue an opinion when this is required.
- To celebrate agreements and conventions of technical and administrative cooperation in matters within its competence.
- To promote, coordinate and carry out technical cooperation, research, training and improvement activities in tax and customs matters, in the country or abroad.
- Grant the deferral or installment payment of tax or customs debt, in accordance with the Law.
- To request, and if necessary, to implement measures to safeguard the collection of the taxes it administers and to order their suspension when appropriate.
- To control and monitor the movement of goods, regardless of their origin and nature, at the national level. This includes certain products prohibited from importation, such as live animals, narcotics, and footwear.
- Inspect, audit and control customs agencies, official dispatchers, authorized warehouses, bonded warehouses, storage terminals, consignees and means of transport used in the international traffic of people, goods or others.
- To prevent, prosecute and denounce smuggling, customs revenue fraud, tax evasion, illicit trafficking of goods, as well as to apply measures to safeguard the fiscal interest.
- Develop and apply systems for verification and control of the quality, quantity, type, class and value of goods, except those in transit and transshipment, in order to determine their classification in the tariff nomenclature and the duties applicable to them.
- Develop and manage the systems for analyzing and auditing the values declared by users of the customs service.
- To resolve contentious and non-contentious matters and, in this sense, to resolve administratively the appeals filed by taxpayers or responsible parties; to grant appeals and to comply with the Resolutions of the Tax Court, and where appropriate, those of the Judicial Branch.
- To sanction those who contravene the legal and administrative provisions of a tax and customs nature, in accordance with the Law.
- To exercise the necessary acts and coercive measures for the collection of debts for the concepts indicated in the preceding paragraph.
- To keep in custody the seized, confiscated or impounded goods, carrying out the auction of the same when appropriate in the exercise of their functions.
- As an exceptional method of disposing of goods, direct allocation will be granted to state entities and those officially recognized as having non-profit welfare or educational purposes.
- Develop information, outreach and training programs on tax and customs matters.
- To edit, reproduce and officially publish the updated National Customs Tariff, customs treaties and agreements, as well as customs rules and procedures for general use.
- To determine the correct application and collection of customs duties and other taxes whose collection is entrusted to it according to law, as well as the fees it charges for the services it provides.
- Participate in the negotiation of International Agreements and Treaties that affect national customs activity and collaborate with International Organizations of a customs nature.
- To create, within its competence, customs administrations and control posts, as well as to authorize their organization, operation, suspension, merger, transfer or deactivation when the needs of the service so require.
- To perform other functions that are compatible with the purpose of the National Superintendency of Customs and Tax Administration.

== Single taxpayer registration ==
Within the tax system, it is mandatory to be registered in the RUC within 12 months following the date of registration of the company or its entry into Peruvian territory. This is accessible from the SUNAT website.

== Authorities ==
General Directorate of Contributions

- 1920 - 1925: Benjamin Avilés
- 1925: Lizardo Bartra Silva
- 1925 - 1930: Luis de Izcue

General Superintendency of Contributions (1942-1969)

- 1942: Daniel Ruzzo
- 1946 - 1949: Enrique Vidal Cárdenas
- 1953 - 1955: Carlos D'Ugard Murgado
- 1955 - 1964: Luis Tola Pasquel
- 1964 - 1968: Juan Chávez Molina
- 1968: Antonio Tarnawiecky

General Directorate of Contributions (1969-1988)

- 1969: Colonel (r) Miguel Pierrend Meza
- 1971: Colonel EP José Villafuerte Farfán
- 1980 - 1982: Armando Zolezzi Möller
- 1984: Javier Luque Bustamante

National Superintendency of Tax Administration - SUNAT (1988–present)

- 1988: Alfredo Jalilie Awapara
- 01/06/1989 - 13/02/1990: Jorge Torres Aciego
- 20/08/1990 - 21/02/1991: Humberto Rivas Grados (Brigadier General (ret.) EP)
- 1991 - 1992: Manuel Estela Benavides
- 1992 - 1994: Sandro Fuentes Acurio
- 1994 - 1997: Adrián Revilla Vergara
- 1997 - 1998: Jorge Baca Campodónico
- 1998 - 2000: Jaime Iberico Iberico
- 2000: Enrique Díaz Ortega Ortega
- 2000: Rosario Almenara Díaz de Pezo
- 2000 - 2001: Luis Alberto Arias Minaya
- 2001 - 2003: Beatriz Merino Lucero
- 2003 - 2007: Nahil Liliana Hirsh Carrillo
- 2007 - 2008: Laura Berta Calderón Regjo
- 2009 - 2010: Manuel Velarde Dellepiane
- 2010 - 2011: Nahil Liliana Hirsh Carrillo
- 2011 - 2015: Tania Lourdes Quispe Mansilla
- 2015 - 2016: Victor Martin Ramos Chavez
- 2016 - 2018: Victor Shiguiyama Kobashigawa
- 2018 - 2020: Claudia Liliana Concepción Suárez Gutiérrez
- 2020 - 2024: Luis Enrique Vera Castillo
- 2024 - 2024: Gerardo López Gonzales
- 2024–present: Víctor Mejía Ninacondor
