= María Antonieta Alva =

Peruvian politician

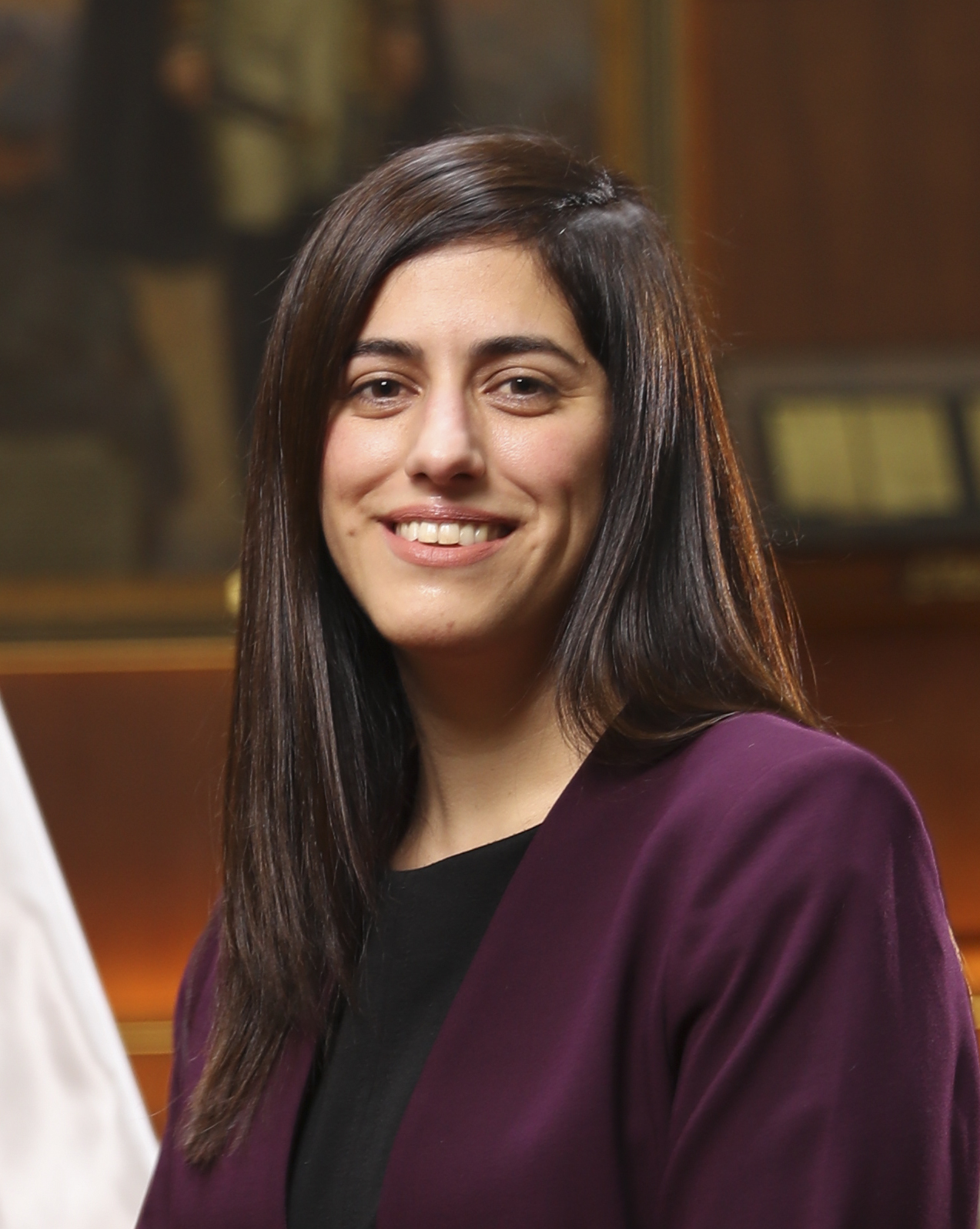

Minister of Economy and Finance
- In office 3 October 2019 – 9 November 2020
- President: Martín Vizcarra
- Prime Minister: Vicente Zeballos; Pedro Cateriano; Walter Martos
- Deputy: Mario Arróspide Medina (Economy); Juan Carlos Chávez Cuentas (Finance)
- Preceded by: Carlos Oliva Neyra
- Succeeded by: José Arista

Personal details
- Born: 7 March 1985 (age 41) Lima, Peru
- Party: Independent
- Education: University of the Pacific (BA); John F. Kennedy School of Government (MPA/ID)
- Occupation: Public administrator

María Antonieta Alva Luperdi (born 7 March 1985) is a Peruvian public administrator who served as Minister of Economy and Finance from October 2019 to November 2020. Alva previously served at various departments in the Peruvian government, mainly the Ministry of Economy and Finance and the Ministry of Education.

== Early life and education ==
Born in Lima, Peru, on 7 March 1985, María Antonieta Alva Luperdi is the daughter of Jorge Elías Alva Hurtado, current Rector of the National University of Engineering, and María Antonieta Luperdi Brito. She completed her high school at the Colegio Villa María in the city of Lima.

She pursued her undergraduate studies at the Universidad del Pacífico, where she served as president of the Student Center. She was general director (2005 to 2007) of the civil association Coherencia, an intercollegiate political organization She graduated in 2008 with a bachelor's degree in Economics.

Alva attained a Master's in Public Administration in International Development (MPA/ID) from the John F. Kennedy School of Government at Harvard University, which she accessed after obtaining the Fulbright and Mary Jo Bane scholarships (2012-2014). She also completed an internship at the Pratham Foundation Aser Center in New Delhi, India, as part of Harvard's Women and Public Policy program. In the same way, she took leadership programs at Georgetown University.

== Career ==
In her last year of college, Alva joined the Peruvian Ministry of Economy and Finance as an assistant and analyst in the Public Investment Department, and later in the Public Budget Department, in 2007.

In 2012, she transferred to the newly created Ministry of Development and Social Inclusion, where she served as analyst at the Office of the Deputy Minister.

Following her graduation from Harvard, Alva was appointed to the Ministry of Education as coordinator of Management Tools for Results, head of the Programming Unit, and finally in 2015, Head of the Budget and Planning Office.

She returned to the Ministry of Economy and Finance in 2017 as advisor to the Public Investment Department. She ultimately was appointed Director General of Public Budget of the Ministry.

Academically, she has taught at a graduate level at the School of Administration of the National University of San Marcos.

== Minister of Economy and Finance ==
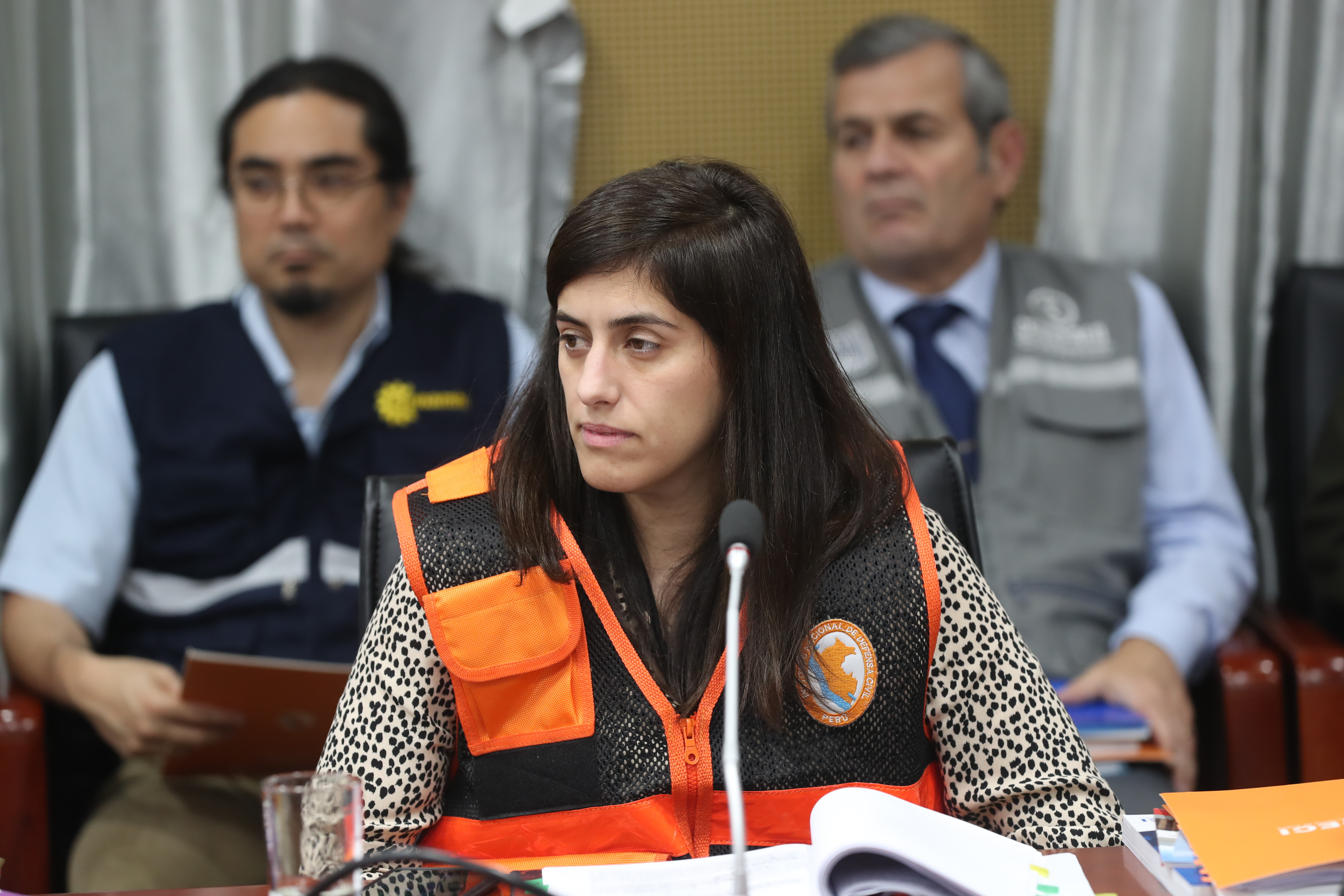
María Antonieta Alva in January 2020 at an emergency summit led by president Vizcarra.

On 3 October 2019, she was appointed Minister of Economy and Finance, as part of the new cabinet led by Vicente Zeballos, in the aftermath of the dissolution of the Peruvian Congress by president Martín Vizcarra.

In the context of the coronavirus disease pandemic, under her leadership, the Ministry of Economy and Finance activated an economic plan to mitigate the impacts of the health situation on the national economy, work that was recognized by some international media such as France 24, Infobae, and Bloomberg.

Within the same framework, Congress began to discuss a bill to allow contributors to the Private Pension System to have 25% of their contributions to combat the crisis; However, Minister Alva was against the bill because in order to achieve this, the Pension Fund Administrators Association (AFP) would have to sell assets to obtain liquidity. The minister even said that at one extreme, this measure could break the financial system.

In order to get ahead, the financial system needs to remain healthy. Measures related to CTS, AFPs, with banking interests, cannot be massive because in an extreme scenario we could also break the financial system (...) That money [AFP funds] is not liquid, it is invested in treasury bonds. It is a terrible time to do something massive (...) These measures move us away from the objective. A massive measure like this can only accentuate the crisis.

— María Antonieta Alva, 29 March 2020

On 25 June, congressmen from Union for Peru and Broad Front reached the required accessions to present an appeal to Minister Alva to present the results of the economic and reactivation measures implemented by the government.

Peru's gross domestic product fell 30.2 percent in the second quarter of 2020 as a result of economic lockdown measures, the largest decline of all major economies, with many small service businesses that represent the majority of businesses of Peru's economy going bankrupt during the crisis. Employment also dropped 40 percent compared to the previous rate while the Peruvian government approved 128 billion PEN ($35.8 billion USD) of tax relief and low-rate business loans to deter further economic decline. A motion for the interpellation of Alva was approved by the Congress of Peru on 24 August 2020, with the motion describing measures taken by the government as a "failure".

Alva resigned alongside Walter Martos' cabinet following the impeachment and subsequent office removal of President Martín Vizcarra, on 9 November 2020.
