= Manuel de Mendiburu =

Peruvian statesman and historian

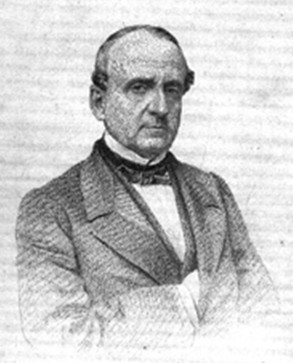

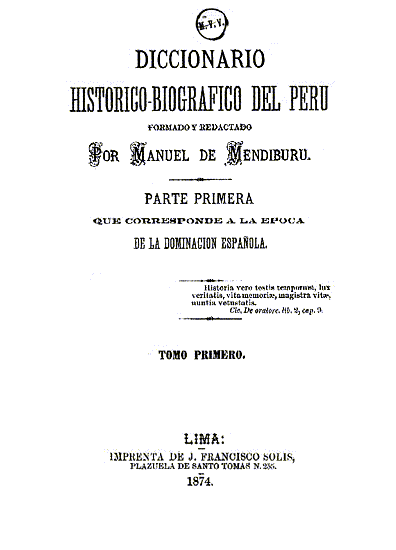

Manuel de Mendiburu (20 October 1805 – 21 January 1885) was a Peruvian statesman and historian born in Lima.

He was educated at the University of San Marcos. When the movement for independence reached Peru, he joined the patriot army as a color sergeant in 1821. As lieutenant he distinguished himself in various battles, and was captured by the Spanish. After the end of the war he was made captain (1830) and by 1851 had reached the rank of general. He filled various roles during his long and active political career. In 1831 he was sent on special missions to Brazil and Spain. From 1834 to 1870 he was employed in the government service, filling successively the positions of prefect of various departments; holding the portfolios of Government, Finance, Foreign Relations, and War and Marine; serving as deputy in congress, Vice President of the Constituent Assembly, and Minister of Peru to England, to Bolivia, and to Chile.

In 1870 he was placed in charge of the School of Arts and Trades at Lima. He organized the Archivo Nacional de Lima, which contains his monumental work Diccionario histórico-biográfico del Perú (1874-85). The publication is invaluable for the study of Peruvian history, especially during the colonial era.

Two digitized volumes are available at the Miguel de Cervantes Virtual Library.

Political offices
Preceded by Manuel Irigoyen Larrea	Prime Minister of Peru; 1879	Succeeded by Manuel Gonzáles de la Cotera
