= Juan García del Río =

Colombian diplomat, writer and politician

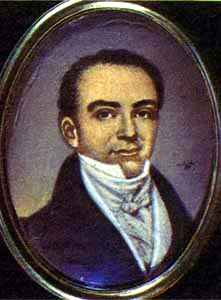
Juan García del Río

Juan García del Río (Cartagena de Indias, 1794 – Mexico City, 1856) was a Colombian diplomat, writer and politician.

He was Minister of Finance of Ecuador from 1832 to 1834. He was Minister of Finance of Peru in 1836, 1836–1837, and 1837–1838, also serving as its first ambassador to the United Kingdom in 1822.

Besides his political work he also translated a play Pizarro, written by the Irishman Richard Brinsley Sheridan which was eventually published in Valparaíso, Chile in 1844.
