= Regional Government of Amazonas =

Regional government in Peru

- Gobierno Regional de Amazonas
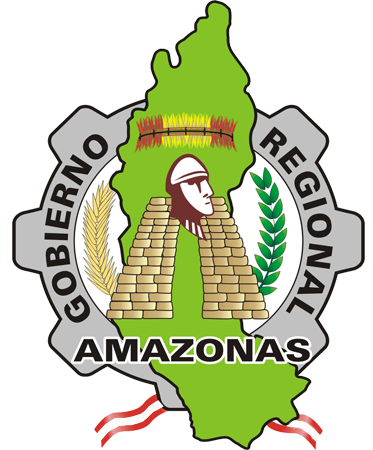

Regional Government overview
- Formed: January 1, 2003; 22 years ago
- Jurisdiction: Department of Amazonas
- Headquarters: Chachapoyas
- Website: Government site

The Regional Government of Amazonas (Spanish: Gobierno Regional de Amazonas; GORE Amazonas) is the regional government that represents the Department of Amazonas. It is the body with legal identity in public law and its own assets, which is in charge of the administration of provinces of the department in Peru. Its purpose is the social, cultural and economic development of its constituency. It is based in the city of Chachapoyas.

== List of representatives ==
No.	Governor	Political party	Period
1	Miguel Reyes Contreras	APRA	January 1, 2003–December 31, 2006
2	Oscar Altamirano Quispe	Fuerza Democrática	January 1, 2007–December 31, 2010
3	José Arista Arbildo	Alianza Regional Juntos Por Amazonas	January 1, 2011–December 31, 2014
4	Gilmer Horna Corrales	Sentimiento Amazonense Regional	January 1, 2015–December 31, 2018
5	Oscar Altamirano Quispe	Movimiento Regional Fuerza Amazonense	January 1, 2019–Incumbent

== See also ==
- Regional Governments of Peru
- Department of Amazonas, Peru
