= Emilio Guimoye =

Peruvian entrepreneur, ex-minister, and agricultural investor

Emilio Guimoye Hernandez (1891–1988/89) was a Peruvian agricultural entrepreneur who served as Minister of Economy and Finance (Secretary of the Treasury) from 1954 to 1955 for the Republic of Peru.

Emilio Guimoye was born in Callao, Peru. His father died when he was 8 years old, his mother when he was 12, which forced him to withdraw from school and work to support his younger siblings. At the age of 14 he decided to go with his siblings to the southern village of Chincha, where he worked to many different trades. In 1915, he rented the Mencia farm in the Pisco Valley and became an agricultural entrepreneur. He undertook agricultural activities in nearly every valley on the country's central and southern coast, and re-invested the profits in other companies, from banking and financial entities to hotels, like the famous Hotel Paracas in Pisco, and real estate investments.

In 1954, the Peruvian economy was in crisis. Aware of the country's difficult situation, Guimoye did not hesitate to put his business aside and volunteered as Development Minister for the administration in office at the time, headed by Manuel A. Odría. By the end of the following year, he had performed very well in office. With a restored economy, and debts paid, he resigned his post. He only yearned to go back to his farming dream: the colonization of the northern Peruvian rainforest. Guimoye was adamant in the belief that the nation's rainforest offered significant economic and social opportunities, and that the nation's future lay in developing this potential. Therefore, instead of retiring, he decided to invest everything he owned in the colonization of Peru's northern rainforest. Guimoye settled in the Bagua area, where he dedicated himself to the cultivation of rice and cotton fields, as well as cattle breeding. However his hopes were frustrated by the Agrarian reform decreed by the left-wing dictatorship of Juan Velasco Alvarado in the 1970s, which paralyzed the initiative he had started.

Guimoye died at the age of 97.

Not too long after his death, the Peruvian postal service Serpost, printed a limited edition collection stamp, in memoriam and recognition of who was one of the most important pioneers in agricultural property for the Republic of Peru.

The Republic of Peru, currently owes to Emilio Guimoye and family members, the amount of US$30'000,000.00 as an indemnification, product of the agricultural reform on which his lands were taken away.
