= Hotel Paracas =

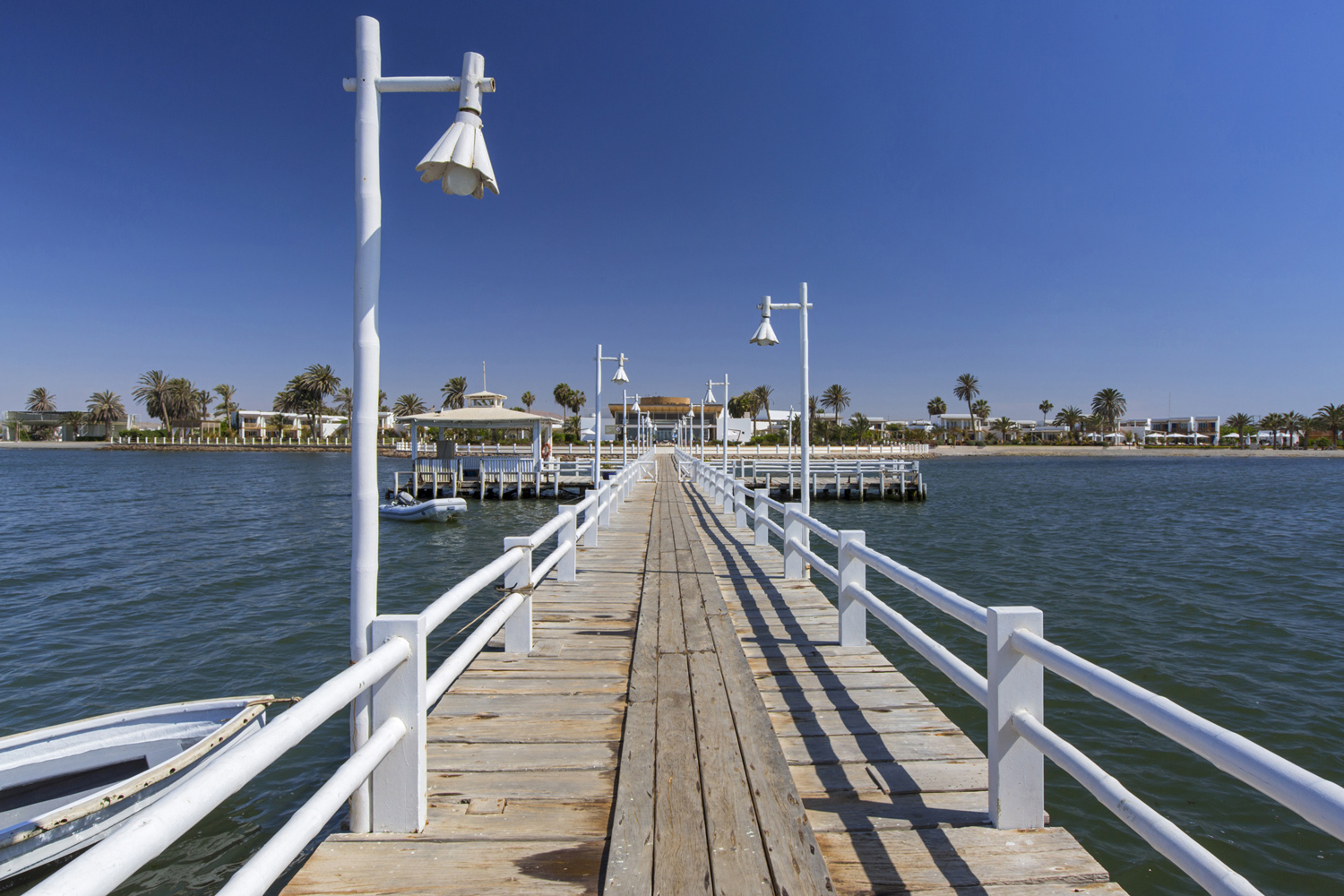
- Local beach

- Location within Peru

General information
- Location: Paracas Bay, Paracas District, Pisco Province, Peru
- Coordinates: 13°50′9″S 76°15′16″W
- Opening: 1944 (reopened in november 2009)
- Owner: Libertador Hotels, Resorts & Spas

Other information
- Number of rooms: 120
- Number of suites: 16
- Number of restaurants: 4

Website
- www.marriott.com/hotels/travel/piolc-hotel-paracas-a-luxury-collection-resort-paracas/

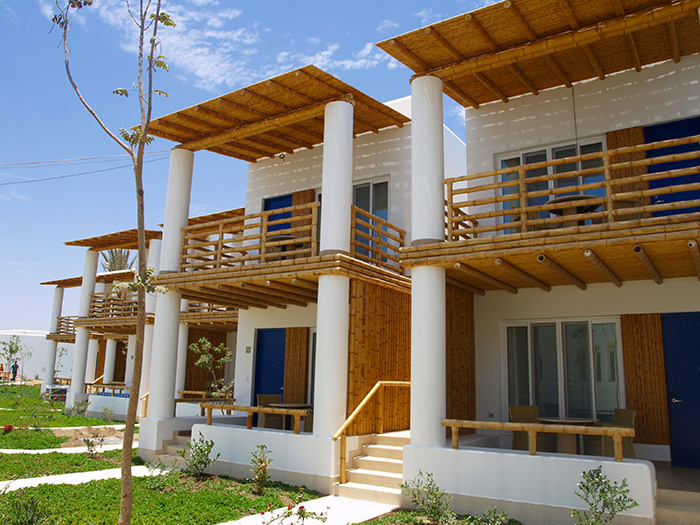
Part of the hotel

Hotel Paracas, part of The Luxury Collection, is a five star hotel located near Pisco, Peru, 240 kilometres south of Lima. The hotel was established in 1944 year by Emilio Guimoye and is a luxury resort surrounded by desert at Paracas Bay on the Pacific coast. It has 120 rooms, two pools, a lounge bar, three restaurants and a spa.

The bay, once home to Paracas culture, is a national reserve lined with wild beaches and sheltering large populations of sea lions, Humboldt penguins and sea otters.

From the hotel's private dock, boat excursions set out across the bay, offering a view of the ancient geoglyph, Paracas Candelabra, before heading on to the Islas Ballestas home to numerous colonies of local birds and sea mammals.

== Restaurants ==
The hotel has four restaurants and lounges. The Ballestas Restaurant serves Peruvian fusion cuisine such as seafood, mashed potato, avocado, Peruvian chillies and aioli etc. The Bar Lounge serves fusion snacks such as ceviche and a beverage known as the Pisco Sour which includes ingredients such as lemon juice, egg white, sugar syrup and angostura bitter. There is also the Zarcillo Bar serving drinks in a fire-lit room which has some curious items such as a shark jaw and a dolphin skeleton, and the Trattoria restaurant which serves Italian cuisine.

== Restoration ==
The hotel was severely damaged during the 2007 Peruvian earthquake. Two years later, in November 2009, it reopens and the boating dock is the only remaining part of the original hotel. The new building was designed by Bernardo Fort-Brescia, that also part owns the hotel. It is a franchise, part of The Luxury Collection and is owned by Libertador Hotels, Resorts & Spas, a luxury hotel chain from Peru.

The hotel is a white cubist display of two-storey buildings with bamboo. It has 120 rooms and 16 luxury suites. 40 of the rooms overlook the sea.
