= José Arista Arbildo =

Peruvian economist and politician (born 1959)

José Arista
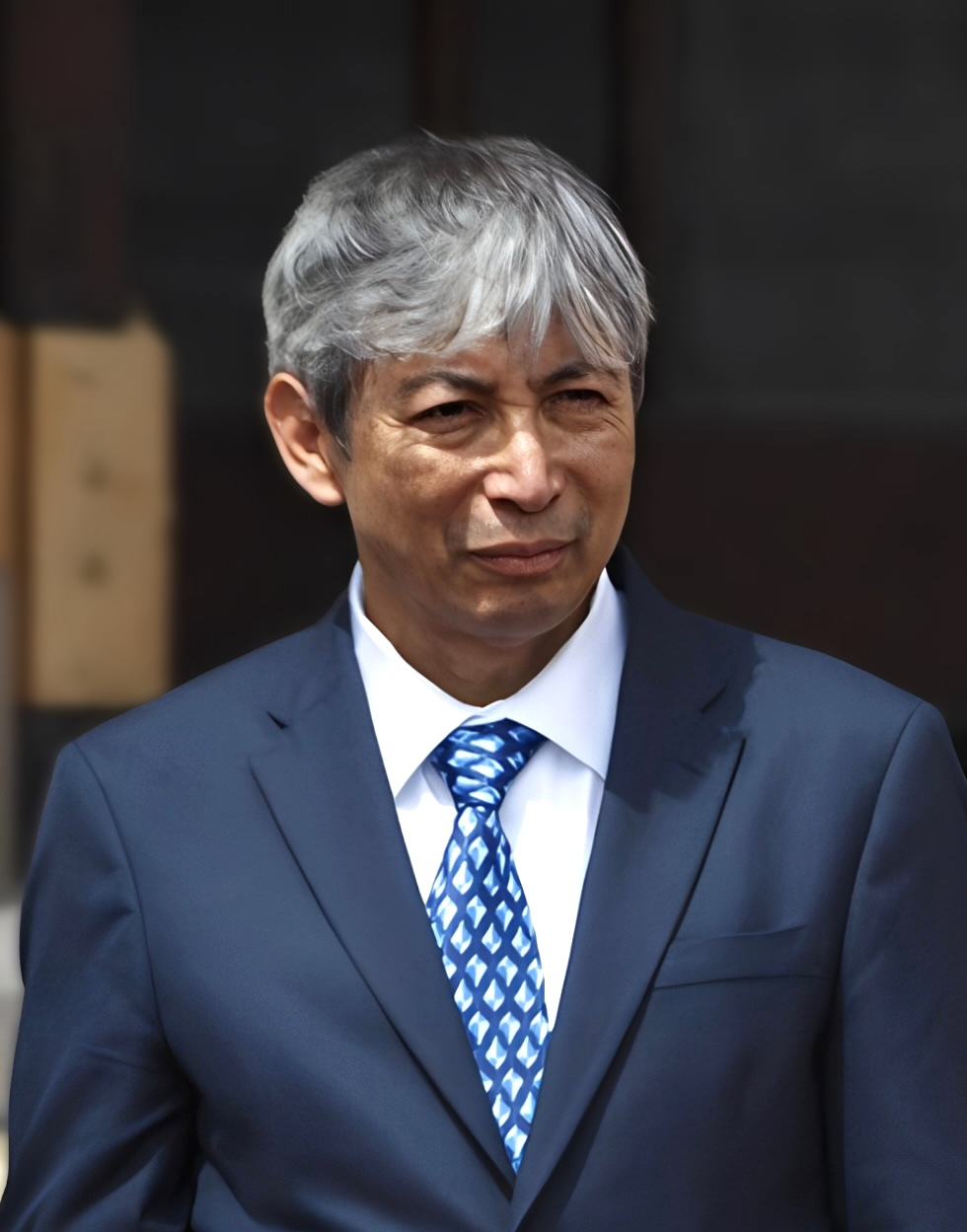
- Arista in 2024

Governor of Amazonas
- In office 1 January 2011 – 31 December 2014
- Preceded by: Oscar Altamirano Quispe
- Succeeded by: Gilmer Horna Corrales

Minister of Economy and Finance
- In office 13 February 2024 – 31 January 2025
- President: Dina Boluarte
- Prime Minister: Alberto Otárola; Gustavo Adrianzén
- Preceded by: Alex Contreras Miranda
- Succeeded by: José Salardi
- In office 10 November 2020 – 15 November 2020
- President: Manuel Merino
- Prime Minister: Ántero Flores Aráoz
- Preceded by: María Antonieta Alva
- Succeeded by: Waldo Mendoza

Minister of Agriculture and Irrigation
- In office 9 January 2018 – 2 April 2018
- Prime Minister: Mercedes Aráoz
- Preceded by: José Hernández Calderón
- Succeeded by: Gustavo Mostajo

Member of Senate
- Incumbent
- Assumed office 26 July 2026
- Constituency: Amazonas

Personal details
- Born: 18 August 1959 (age 67) Huambo, Peru
- Party: Popular Force
- Spouse: Divorciado
- Children: 3
- Education: Pontifical Catholic University of Peru (BA); University of California, Los Angeles (BA)
- Profession: Economist; politician

José Berley Arista Arbildo (born 18 August 1959) is a Peruvian economist and politician, a member of Popular Force party. He is the senator-elect for the Department of Amazonas constituency.

== Political career ==
From 2011 to 2014, he served as the Governor of Amazonas.

In 2018, President Pedro Pablo Kuczynski appointed him as the Minister of Agriculture and Irrigation, until Martín Vizcarra became president.

On 10 November 2020, he was appointed the Minister of Economy and Finance by President Manuel Merino, until Merino's resignation five days later. Arista was appointed the Minister of Economy and Finance again in February 2024 by President Dina Boluarte, serving through January 2025.

In 2025, he joined the Popular Force party. He ran for the seat in the Peruvian Senate for the Department of Amazonas constituency, and was elected in April 2026.
