= Hans Otto Storm =

American novelist

Hans Otto Storm (1895–1941) was a German-American novelist and radio engineer. His literary reputation quickly faded into obscurity after his early death, but in the 1940s received some positive praise from literary critic Edmund Wilson.

He is one of many people who has been speculatively suggested to be the pseudonymous writer B. Traven.

== Life ==
Storm was born in Bloomington, California to German parents who may have been refugees fleeing anti-socialist fervor following the failed Revolutions of 1848. He studied engineering at Stanford University and entered the emerging field of radio. He traveled in South and Central America, including long spells in Nicaragua and Peru. He served two years with a United States Army hospital during World War I.

Storm died of accidental electrocution on December 11, 1941, a few days after the attack on Pearl Harbor, while rushing to complete a large radio transformer for the Army Signal Corps in a laboratory in San Francisco.

His literary papers are archived at Bancroft Library at the University of California, Berkeley.

== Novels ==
Storm's first novel, Full Measure (1929), is about industrial expansion and is strongest on the subject of radio engineering and equipment. It "received mildly positive reviews but sold little over a thousand copies." His next novel, Pity the Tyrant (1937), is about an American engineer who becomes involved in a Peruvian revolution who is "sorely perplexed between his job, his proletarian political sympathies and his love affair with a South American lady." Edmund Wilson considered it Storm's best work. The tyrant of the title is based on Augusto Leguía, President of Peru from 1919 to 1930, "whose rule was marked by rebellion, suppression of his opponents, and widespread corruption." His next novel, Made in the USA (1939) is a "social fable" about a tramp steamer full of passengers that becomes stuck on a sandbar in the South Pacific. Civilized behavior deteriorates and the passengers break into two warring camps.

His last novel, Count Ten (1940) is his longest and most heavily marketed; it follows thirty years of the life of its protagonist, Eric Marsden. In Edmund Wilson's estimation, the novel is "very much inferior on the whole to the ones that had gone before." Wilson also thought that it showed "what seemed internal evidence of having been written earlier," giving off the air of "one of those autobiographical novels that young men begin in college and carry around for years in old trunks."
