= Augusto B. Leguía =

President and dictator of Peru

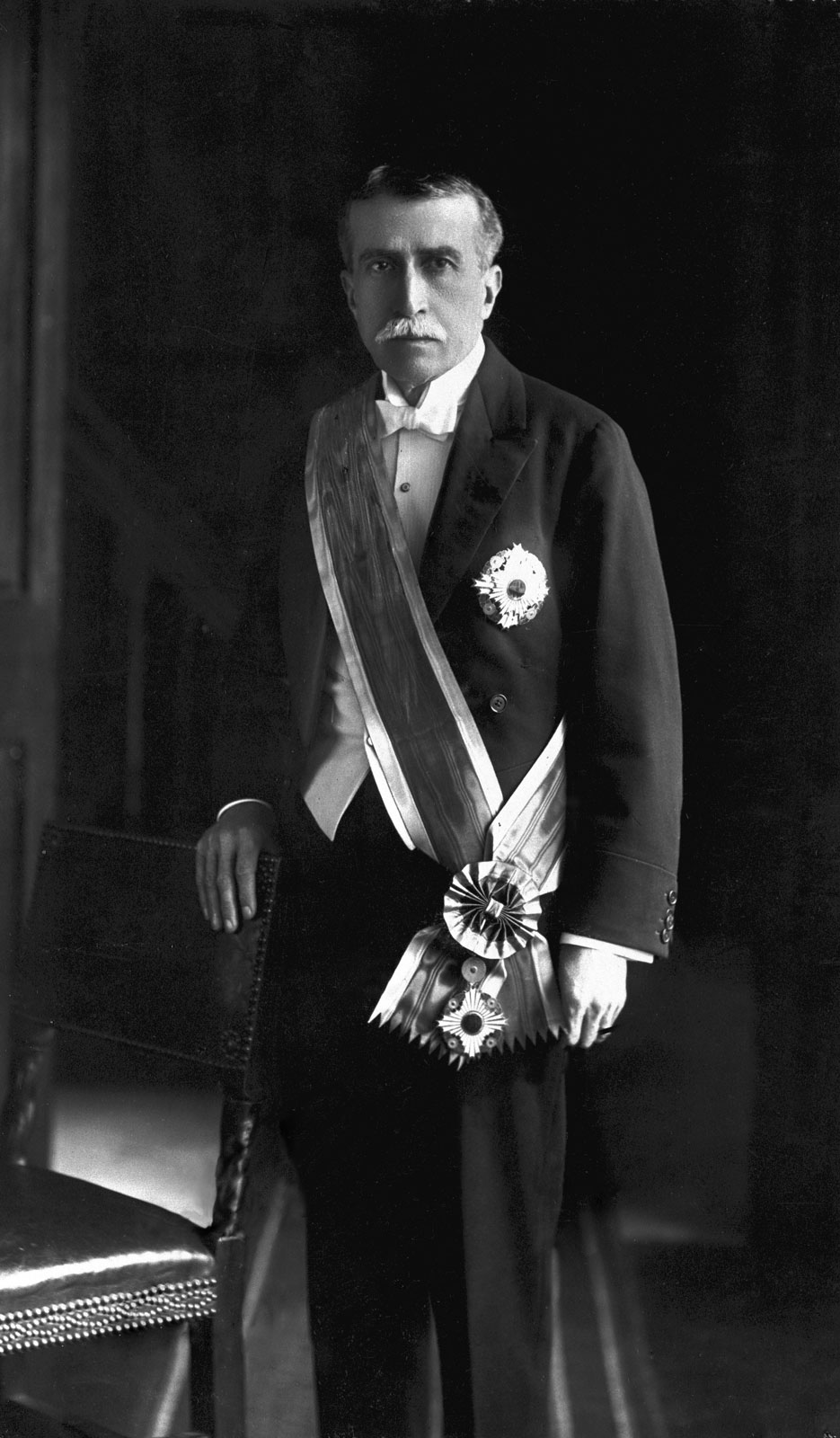
- Official portrait, c. 1908–1912

President of Peru
- In office 12 October 1919 – 25 August 1930
- Prime Minister: See list: Melitón Porras Osores; Germán Leguía y Martínez; Julio Ego-Aguirre Dongo; Alejandro Maguiña; Pedro José Rada y Gamio; Benjamín Huamán de los Heros; Fernando Sarmiento Ramírez
- Vice President: César Canevaro; Agustín de la Torre
- Preceded by: Himself (Provisional President)
- Succeeded by: Manuel Ponce (Military Junta)
- In office 24 September 1908 – 24 September 1912
- Prime Minister: See list: Eulogio Romero Salcedo; Rafael Fernández de Villanueva; Javier Prado y Ugarteche; Germán Schreiber Waddington; José Salvador Cavero Ovalle; Enrique C. Basadre Stevenson; Agustín Ganoza y Cavero
- Vice President: Eugenio Larrabure y Unanue; Belisario Sosa
- Preceded by: José Pardo y Barreda
- Succeeded by: Guillermo Billinghurst

Provisional President of Peru Coup d'état
- In office 4 July – 12 October 1919
- Prime Minister: Mariano Cornejo Zenteno; Melitón Porras Osores
- Preceded by: José Pardo y Barreda (Constitutional President)
- Succeeded by: Himself (Constitutional President)

Prime Minister of Peru
- In office 24 September 1904 – 1 August 1907
- President: José Pardo y Barreda
- Preceded by: Alberto Elmore
- Succeeded by: Agustín Tovar Aguilar

Minister of Finance and Commerce
- In office 8 September 1903 – 1 August 1907
- President: Manuel Candamo; Serapio Calderón; José Pardo y Barreda
- Prime Minister: José Pardo y Barreda; Alberto Elmore; Himself
- Preceded by: Pablo Sarria
- Succeeded by: Germán Schreiber

Personal details
- Born: 19 February 1863 Lambayeque, Peru
- Died: 6 February 1932 (aged 68) Callao, Peru
- Party: Reformist Democratic Party
- Other political affiliations: Civilista Party (until 1920)
- Spouse: Julia Swayne y Mariátegui (m. 1890; died 1919)
- Profession: Economist

Augusto Bernardino Leguía y Salcedo (19 February 1863 – 6 February 1932) was a Peruvian politician and dictator who served as President of Peru from 1908 to 1912 and from 1919 to 1930, the latter term known as the "Oncenio" after its eleven-year length.

== Early life ==
Augusto Leguía was born in Lambayeque in 1863, and later married into one of the most distinguished families of the Peruvian oligarchy. Educated in Valparaíso, Chile, he served in the Peruvian Army during the War of the Pacific (1879–1881).

After the war he moved to the United States and became an insurance executive with the New York Life Insurance Company. By the 1900s, Leguía had become very wealthy and decided to return to Peru. He entered politics in 1903 at the urging of Manuel Candamo (the then-leader of the Civilista Party) and also of José Pardo, who was prime minister. Leguía took the position of Minister of Finance, a post he would retain until 1904, when the former Prime Minister José Pardo became president. Pardo offered the position of Prime Minister to Leguía, who accepted and remained so until 1907, when he resigned to run for the presidency the following year.

== First Presidency (1908-1912) ==
In 1908 he succeeded José Pardo (a succession event that would occur again in 1919) after being elected president for the first time by an alliance of the Civil and Constitutional parties. Some of Leguía's first actions were to institute social and economic reforms in an attempt to industrialize Peru and turn it into a modern capitalist society. In 1911, what has been described as "the first significant social security law in Peru" was passed, with occupational accident protection introduced for workers in mechanized private enterprises earnings less than 20,000 soles.

On 29 May 1909, a group of citizens (supporters of Piérola's Democratic Party) managed to force their entry into the Palacio de Gobierno demanding the resignation of Leguía. Among the group were the brother and sons of Piérola; Carlos de Piérola, Isaías de Piérola and Amadeo de Piérola. Since Leguía did not resign as planned, they kidnapped him and took him in front of the Bolivar Monument (located in Plaza inquisicion in Lima). Once there, Leguía did not acquiesce to their demands, and the police had to forcibly rescue the president in the midst of a fight that caused at least 100 deaths.

During this period the country was also confronting boundary disputes with five of its neighbors. Leguía succeeded in reaching agreements with two of them, Bolivia and Brazil.

The boundary with Brazil was settled with the signing of the Treaty of Velarde-Río Branco. This provided that two rivers (Yaravi and Yaverija) would compose most of the border for both countries. With Bolivia, The Treaty of Polo-Bustamante determined the partition of the Lake Titicaca and provided a much more accurate definition of the Peruvian-Bolivian border. This treaty also delimited the borders with Tacna (which was until then in Chilean control).

When Leguía's term ended in 1912, he was succeeded by Guillermo Billinghurst, a millionaire businessman who had been the former mayor of Lima. During the following years, Leguía travelled in the United Kingdom and the United States, where he learned methods of banking and finance that he would later apply in Peru. During this time, Leguia was already in conflict with the Civilista Party and left its organization.

== Second Presidency (1919-1930) ==
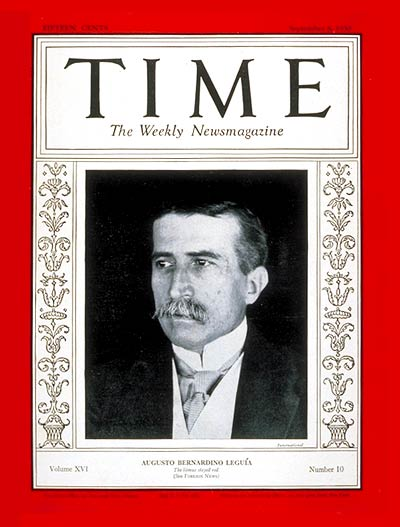
Leguía portrayed on the cover of Time (1930)

In 1919, he again sought the presidency of Peru by trying to succeed José Pardo. Fearing that the former president's government along with the Civilist Parliament would not recognise his victory, he launched a successful military coup, which led Leguía to succeed Pardo as an interim president. He then proceeded to dissolve Congress and the new parliament elected him constitutional president of Peru.

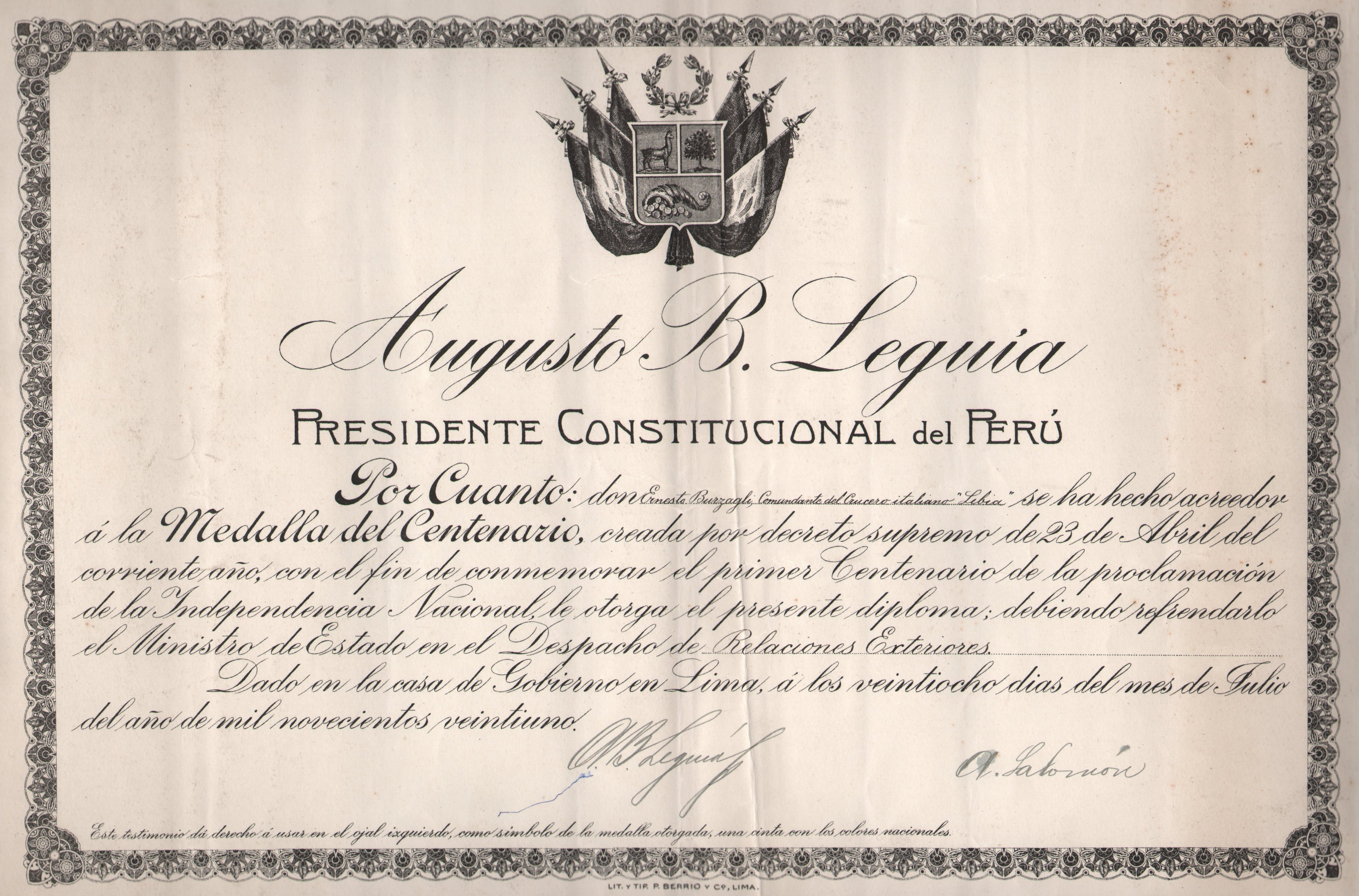
During Leguía's presidency, Peru celebrated its centenary from its independence from Spain. Leguía's name figures prominently on the diploma which accompanied the commemorative decoration awarded to Captain Ernesto Burzagli of the Italian Royal Navy when his ship visited Peru as part of a round-the-world voyage.

Leguía changed the Peruvian constitution (which had the longest continuance since 1860), and promulgated a new one in 1920, which was more liberal than its predecessor and provided more civil guarantees and unlimited reelections. Nevertheless, having himself promulgated the constitution, Augusto B. Leguía almost completely ignored it.

The years of his tenure were marked with a dictatorial style of ruling by suppressing all opposition harshly.

Although he represented the Peruvian oligarchy, the oligarchs revolted against him when he came to power, and it was his loyal supporters who installed him. Therefore he broke ties with the oligarchy, who protested his coup.

Various political opponents of his government were exiled, of which the most prominent was Víctor Raúl Haya de la Torre, who while in exile in Mexico founded the American Popular Revolutionary Alliance (APRA) in 1924. It became one of modern Peru's most active and controversial political parties. Another important political figure that would emerge during this era was José Carlos Mariátegui, leader of the Communist Party of Peru.

Among the positive initiatives that occurred during Leguía's second term was a program to modernize Lima by planning and starting public works through various loans. These included improving the health-care system by founding hospitals and building drainage systems around the cities. Peru's Government Palace ("Palacio de Gobierno") was also remodeled in 1926. Banks such as the Banco Central de Reserva del Perú and Banco Hipotecario of Peru were also created during his second presidency. Over 800 new primary schools were built, together with a children’s hospital in Lima. In addition, the principle was introduced (as noted by one study) “that compensation must be paid to employees and workmen when they are dismissed from their jobs.”

In 1923, privileged pensions for air force officers were passed, followed by life insurance for white-collar workers the following year. A Supreme Resolution of May 1924 required large business firms operating (as noted by one study) “at some distance from public hospitals” to provide their empleados and obreros with free medical assistance, and a decree of January 1926 laid down (as noted by one study) “the hygienic conditions to be observed in industrial establishments.”

Agriculture was also promoted during the course of Leguía’s presidency. Agricultural experimental stations were set up, together with an agricultural university and model cattle-breeding farms were set up in Puno and other cities in the sierra, and rice cultivation was introduced in the departments of Huancavelica, Ancash, Cajamarca, and Junín. According to one study, "No previous President of Peru had done so much to help the farmer."From 1919 to 1930 agricultural production tripled; an achievement helped by Leguía’s efforts.

Treaties of limits with Colombia and Chile were also signed. The boundary with Colombia was settled with the secession of all the lands between the Putumayo and Caquetá rivers. This was officially solved with the signing of the Treaty of Salomón-Lozano in 1922, published after Leguía's 1930 overthrow. The Tacna–Arica compromise signed with Chile led to economic depression in later years and criticism of Leguía.

In 1922, the Leguía government completed a contract with the International Petroleum Company (IPC) to develop oil fields in the Sechura Desert.

The Leguía government was pro-American. As a gesture of his pro-Americanism, Leguía made a habit of promoting American citizens to the most important departments in the Peruvian government. One such example was William Wilson Cumberland, who was appointed as Administrator of Peruvian Customs with 4 American advisors. The 4th of July was also declared a national holiday in Peru, and a portrait of President James Monroe was also displayed in the presidential office. Leguía's government was the only one in Latin America to support the United States' interventionist policy in Nicaragua and their efforts to suppress Augusto César Sandino in 1927.

=== Overthrow ===
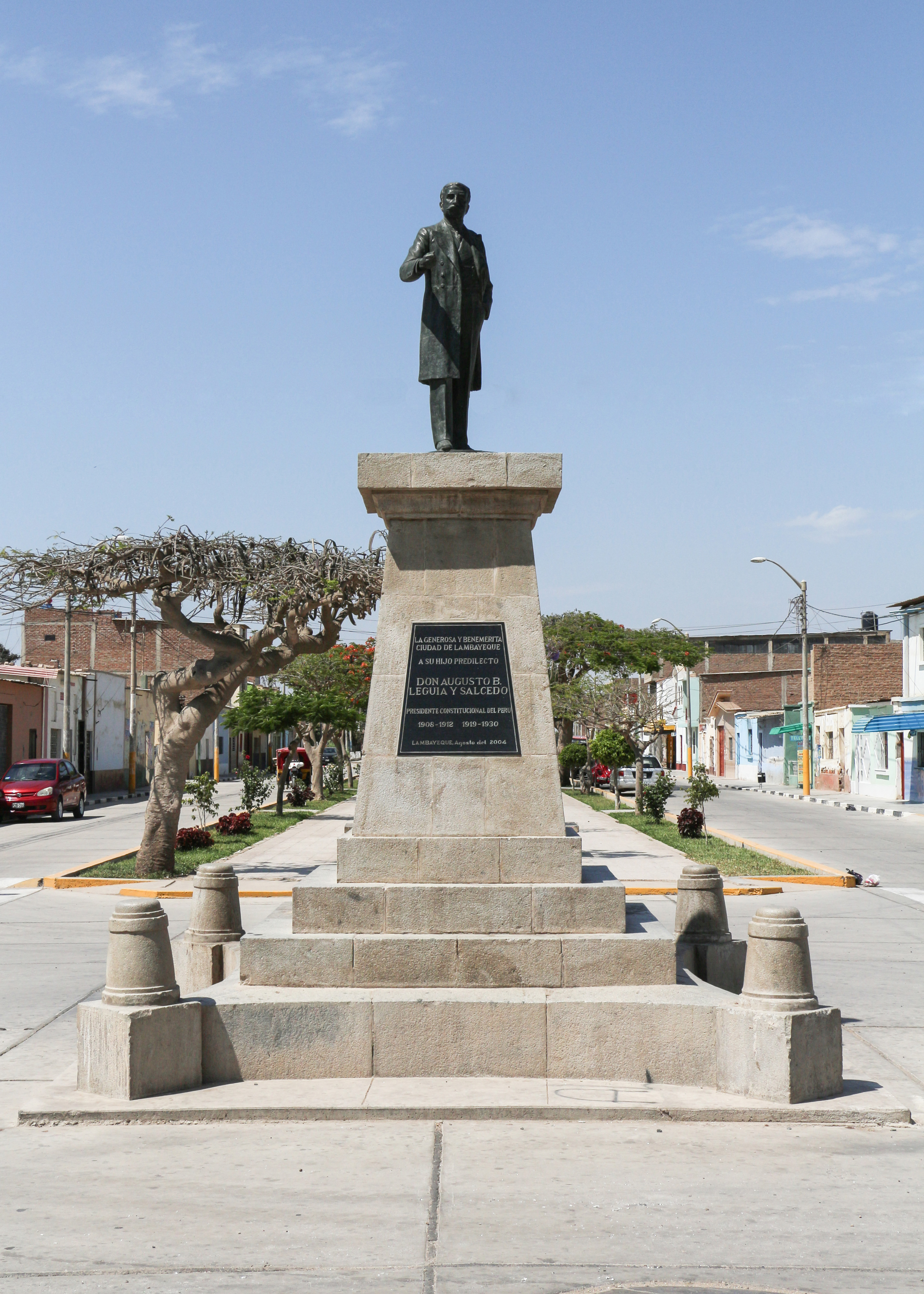
Statue of Augusto B. Leguía in Lambayeque

The Great Depression had drained foreign investment in Peru and put a halt to public works programs. The Leguía government was unpopular among both the upper and lower classes. He was overthrown in a coup on 22 August 1930, which was led by Luis Miguel Sánchez Cerro in Arequipa. Leguía resigned the presidency on 24 August 1930. Leguía was arrested and charged with misappropriating government funds. He remained in confinement in the Panopticon of Lima, and died at a naval hospital on 6 February 1932.

== Legacy ==
Leguía is depicted as a tyrant in the 1937 novel Pity the Tyrant by American novelist Hans Otto Storm. American travel writer Richard Halliburton met Leguía during his Latin American travels chronicled in New World to Conquer. He describes Leguía as a charming and self-effacing "man of the people" who gives a humorous account of the 1908 coup attempt.

== Notes ==
Political offices
Preceded by Pablo Sarria	Minister of Finance; 8 September 1903 – 15 May 1904	Succeeded by Juan José Reynoso
Preceded by Juan José Reynoso	Minister of Finance; 24 September 1904 – 2 August 1907	Succeeded by Germán Schereiber
Preceded by Alberto Fernández de Cordoba	Prime Minister of Peru; 24 September 1904 – 2 August 1907	Succeeded by Agustín Tovar
Preceded by José Pardo	President of Peru; September 1908 – September 1912	Succeeded by Guillermo Billinghurst
Preceded by José Pardo	President of Peru; July 1919 – August 1930	Succeeded by Luis Miguel Sánchez Cerro
