= Johany Alexánder Acuña =

Colombian serial killer (born 1997)

- Born: Johany Alexánder Acuña Hernández; 8 November 1997 (age 28); Mitú, Vaupés, Colombia
- Penalty: 36 years

Details
- Victims: 5
- Span of crimes: 15 April – 25 April 2021
- Country: Colombia
- Date apprehended: 25 April 2021

Johany Alexánder Acuña Hernández (born 8 November 1997) is a Colombian serial killer. According to Colombian authorities, Acuña murdered 5 people, all street dwellers.

He is known as the Loco de la piedra (Stone Madman), He murdered his victims using various brick-type blocks, cement blocks and stones. Acuña confessed to the authorities about several attacks against street people. According to his own confessions, Acuña was seriously injured in his childhood by unknown people "leaving him dying and fighting for his life." This motivated him to carry out the attacks against people on the street and kill them with a single blow "without leaving them dying as they had done to him." His last murder was committed on 25 April 2021, near the San Pedro de San Pedro cemetery in Medellín.

The Attorney General's Office charged him with aggravated homicide in a homogeneous and successive manner. In February 2022, he was sentenced to 36 years in prison by a Medellín circuit judge.

== Murders ==
During the month of April 2021, authorities found several cases of street residents killed in the same way: they had injuries to the head with stone blocks. Most of the victims were killed while they were sleeping on the street or were unprepared. The date of the first murder dates back to 15 April and occurred in the Sevilla neighborhood, in Medellín, after the authorities found the person lying on the street with serious head injuries. The second case occurred on 19 April in San Pedro and whose victim was Luis Miguel Osuna, who also had head injuries. A third victim named Sandro Echavarría Gallego was found with serious head injuries on 24 April, in the Chagualo neighborhood.

In addition to these murders, he was also held responsible for the death of Jhon Rigoberto González Calle, events that occurred in the vicinity of the San Pedro Cemetery, in Medellín. Like the others, this person was also murdered by blows to the head. It is also known that a fifth unidentified person was violently hit in the head with a stone. At the time the authorities verified the incident, they realized that he had fractures in his head and that he was alive, so who was referred to a local Polyclinic in serious condition.

== Investigation ==
The Medellín authorities monitored these crimes for several months. Working groups were coordinated, taking into account the seriousness of the events. As a result of this entire process, it was determined that all the murdered people were street dwellers, in addition to this, it was established that they were hit on the head with blocks of stone or cement, whose attacks occurred at night or during the night. early morning suddenly and selectively. It was also determined that the events occurred in various neighborhoods close to each other.

It was also established that the modus operandi of the aggressor had the same pattern and that, in effect, it was the same person. The objective of this person was to cause the death of people without any reason or justification. In total, "238 hours had elapsed between the first and last homicide."

== See also ==
- List of serial killers in Colombia

== Bibliography ==
- Cruz Niño, Esteban (2023). Los monstruos en Colombia sí existen. Asesinos en serie (in Spanish). Penguin Random House. ISBN 9789585121942.
