= Judith Elida Acuña =

Argentine politician

Member of the Chamber of Deputies
- In office 1952–1955
- Constituency: Corrientes

Judith Elida Acuña was an Argentine politician. She was elected to the Chamber of Deputies in 1951 as one of the first group of female parliamentarians in Argentina.

In the 1951 legislative elections she was a Peronist Party candidate in Corrientes and was one of the 26 women elected to the Chamber of Deputies. She remained in office until the Chamber was dissolved as a result of the Revolución Libertadora in September 1955.
