= Gustavo Saberbein =

Peruvian politician (1945–2025)

Gustavo Alberto Saberbein Chevalier (March 31, 1945 – August 19, 2025) was a Peruvian mechanical engineer and economist.

== Life and career ==
Chevalier was born in Lima on March 31, 1945. He was Minister of Economy and Finance in the first government of Alan García, between 1987 and 1988.

He had previously been a consultant to the Andean Community, the Latin American Institute for Economic and Social Planning, UNIDO, the Economic Commission for Latin America and the Caribbean (ECLAC) and the Friedrich Ebert Foundation. He was also director of Industrias del Perú (1977) and Electro Perú (1978).

From 1997 to 2009 he was a professor at St. Augustine College in Chicago, where he died on August 19, 2025, at the age of 80.
