= Carlos Manuel Acuña =

Carlos Manuel Acuña was a journalist who wrote for La Nación, starting in 1960. La Nación covered a wide range of information, specializing in political issues. Acuña covered stories involving various dissent and political disagreements, and became an analyst of ideological confrontations. His historical accuracy and lively style made his writing especially popular.

Born in 1937, Acuña is the father of five children, grandfather of several grandchildren. During his teens, he lived through the experience of Peronism, and observed the social changes that characterized this period of life in Argentina. He experienced parliamentary politics as a journalist. He was active in radio and television, and directed news agencies, was a correspondent for foreign and domestic publications, and was a columnist.

Acuña participated in the National Pedagogy Conference. Aimed at the broad lines supported by traditional values, his concern about these issues during that time led him to explore and connect with leaders from Europe, Japan, USA and Latin America. This allowed him to personally experience the development of protest issues that arose on the continent during the sixties and seventies. He was also an agricultural leader and lecturer, and he taught courses on the theory and practice of communication.

During the last thirty years of his life or so he dedicated himself to give a detailed account of the history of terrorism in Argentina. In particular that carried out by leftist, communist subversive organizations which are described and analysed in his monumental work Por Amor al Odio( For love of hatred), Los Traidores ( Traitors) and 'Horacio Verbitsky, from La Habana ato the Ford Foundation.'
