= Alberto Tauro del Pino =

Peruvian historian (1914–1994)

- Born: January 17, 1914; Callao, Peru
- Died: February 18, 1994; Callao, Peru
- Education: San Marcos University
- Awards: Order of the Sun, Grand Cross

Alberto Tauro del Pino (Callao, January 17, 1914 — February 18, 1994) was a Peruvian writer, bibliograph and librarian. He carried out important studies in the field of history and literature, mainly in bibliographical topics.

His most notable work was Enciclopedia ilustrada del Perú, a multi-volume encyclopaedia on Peruvian people, events and history, among other things. He also collaborated with fellow historian and writer Jorge Basadre on the reconstruction of the National Library of Peru, after it burned down in a fire in 1943.
