= Government of Peru =

Government of the Republic of Peru
- Spanish: Gobierno de la República de Perú
- Coat of arms
- Formation: November 12, 1823
- Founding document: Constitution of Peru
- Jurisdiction: Peru
- Website: Official website

Legislative branch
- Legislature: Congress of the Republic
- Meeting place: Legislative Palace

Executive branch
- Leader: President of Peru (Note: Although an office of Prime Minister exists (officially that of the "President of the Council of Ministers"), the President of Peru serves as the actual head of government.)
- Appointer: President
- Headquarters: Government Palace
- Main organ: Council of Ministers

Judicial branch
- Court: Supreme Court of Justice
- Seat: Palace of Justice

The Republic of Peru is a unitary state with a multi-party presidential system. The current government was established by the 1993 Constitution of Peru. The government is composed of three branches, being executive, judicial, and legislative branches. The president of Peru is the head of state and the head of government, who is elected to a term of five years.

== Executive branch ==
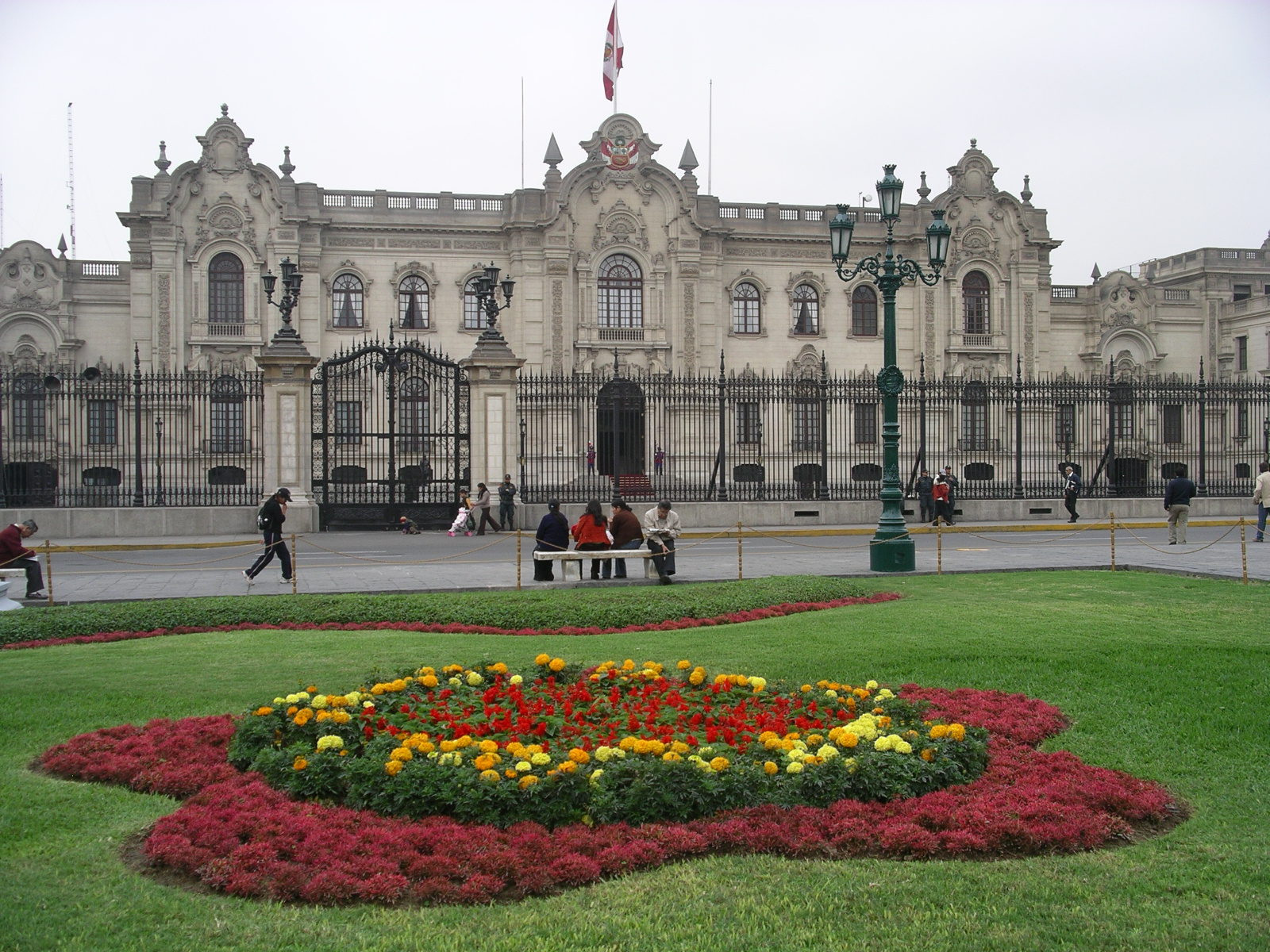
Government Palace of Peru.

Main office-holders
Office	Name	Party	Since
President	Keiko Fujimori	Popular Force	28 July 2026
First Vice President	Luis Galarreta	Popular Force	28 July 2026
Second Vice President	Miki Torres	Popular Force	28 July 2026
Prime Minister	Luis Galarreta	Popular Force	28 July 2026

The president of Peru is the head of state and the head of government, who is elected to a term of five years; incumbents cannot be re-elected for a second consecutive term. Family members may also not immediately succeed in another family member's presidency. The executive branch, in addition to the legislative branch, may propose legislation. After legislation has been passed by the congress, the president may promulgate the legislation, giving it the force of law.

In addition to the president, the executive branch contains the Council of Ministers, which, in addition to the prime minister, are appointed by the president.

=== Requirements to be Minister of State ===
According to Article 124 of the Political Constitution of Peru (1993), in order to be Minister, it is required:

- Be a natural born citizen.
- Be a current citizen.
- Be 25 years old or older.
- Members of the Armed Forces and National Police can be Ministers.

Article 92 states that members of Congress can be Ministers of State.

=== Functions ===
1. Run the process of strategic planning, embedded in the National System of Strategic Planning and determining the sector's functional national goals applicable to every level of government; approve action plans; assign necessary resources to their execution, within the boundaries of the corresponding public budget.
2. Approve the budget proposal to the entities within their sector, abiding by article 32 and supervising their execution.
3. Establish the management measurements of the entities within their sector and evaluate their fulfillment.
4. Propose the inner organization of their Ministry and approve it according to their competencies attributed by Law.
5. Designate and remove the advising positions or any directly appointed, the heads of public entities and other entities of the sector, when this appointment is not explicitly attributed to the Council of Ministries, other authorities or the president; and submit to the president the new appointees for approval on the contrary.
6. Maintain relations with the regional and local government within the competencies attributed to the sector.
7. Countersign the presidential mandates that concern to their Ministry
8. Issue Supreme Resolution and Ministerial Resolutions.
9. Put into effect the transfer of competencies, functions, and sectorial resources to Regional and Local Government and account for their execution.
10. Execute all other functions that are put upon the Ministry by the Political Constitution of Peru, the Law, and the president.

The ministers of state can delegate, within their Ministry, the faculties and powers that are not exclusive to their function, to the extent that it is allowed by Law. Functions 2, 4, 5, 7, and 8 are exclusive to the Minister.

== Ministries of Peru ==
Ministry	Cabinet		Minister	Party	Term	
Ministry	Cabinet		Minister	Party	Start	End
Ministry	No.	PCM	Minister	Party	Start	End
President of the Council of Ministers	1	Galarreta	Luis Galarreta	Popular Force	28 July 2026	Incumbent
Ministry of Foreign Affairs	1	Galarreta	Carlos Espá	SíCreo Party	28 July 2026	Incumbent
Ministry of Defense	1	Galarreta	Rafael Belaúnde	People's Liberty	28 July 2026	Incumbent
Ministry of Economy and Finance	1	Galarreta	Elmer Cuba	Independent	28 July 2026	Incumbent
Ministry of the Interior	1	Galarreta	César Astudillo	Popular Force	28 July 2026	Incumbent
Ministry of Justice and Human Rights	1	Galarreta	Ernesto Álvarez Miranda	Christian People's Party	28 July 2026	Incumbent
Ministry of Education	1	Galarreta	José Antonio Chang	APRA	28 July 2026	Incumbent
Ministry of Health	1	Galarreta	Luis Dyer	Possible Peru	28 July 2026	Incumbent
Ministry of Production	1	Galarreta	Juan Carlos Requejo	Independent	28 July 2026	Incumbent
Ministry of Foreign Trade and Tourism	1	Galarreta	Rogers Valencia	Independent	28 July 2026	Incumbent
Ministry of Energy and Mines	1	Galarreta	Guillermo Shinno	Independent	28 July 2026	Incumbent
Ministry of Transport and Communications	1	Galarreta	Rafael Rey	Popular Force	28 July 2026	Incumbent
Ministry of Housing, Construction and Sanitation	1	Galarreta	Mauricio Arnillas	Independent	28 July 2026	Incumbent
Ministry of Women and Vulnerable Populations	1	Galarreta	María Seminario	Independent	28 July 2026	Incumbent
Ministry of the Environment	1	Galarreta	Vladimiro Huaroc	Popular Force	28 July 2026	Incumbent
Ministry of Culture	1	Galarreta	Alberto Beingolea	Christian People's Party	28 July 2026	Incumbent
Ministry of Development and Social Inclusion	1	Galarreta	Maritza Canales	Independent	28 July 2026	Incumbent

== Judicial branch ==
The judicial branch is represented by the Supreme Court Of Justice, a 16-member body divided into three supreme sectors:

- Civil Sector: Presides over all topics related to civil rights and commercial law.
- Criminal Sector: Presides over all topics relating to criminal law.
- Constitutional and Social Sector: Presides over all topics relating to constitutional rights and labor law.

== Legislative branch ==
The legislative branch of Peru is vested in the Congress of the Republic of Peru, which is bicameral. The legislation is voted on in Congress, then sent to the president, who may approve it.

Due to broadly interpreted impeachment wording in the 1993 Constitution of Peru, the Congress can impeach the president of Peru without cause, effectively making the legislature more powerful than the executive branch. Following a ruling in February 2023 by the Constitutional Court of Peru, whose members are elected by Congress, judicial oversight of the legislative body was also removed by the court, essentially giving Congress absolute control of Peru's government.

== Suffrage ==
Universal suffrage is granted to all over the age of 18. Voting is compulsory until the age of 70. Some argue whether compulsive voting is for the best of the country and the citizens. It is strictly enforced, with certain exceptions permitted.

== See also ==
- Municipalities of Peru
- Politics of Peru
- Regional Governments of Peru
