= Víctor Andrés Marroquín-Merino =

Peruvian political commentator and consultant

National Secretary of International Relations of the Peruvian Aprista Party
- Incumbent
- Assumed office 18 October 2026
- President: Mónica Yaya
- Preceded by: Gerardo Morris Abarca

Personal details
- Born: Víctor Andrés Marroquín-Merino Torres; 1 November 1998 (age 28) Chicago, Illinois, U.S.
- Party: Peruvian Aprista Party
- Education: American Academy of Dramatic Arts (AOS); New York University (BFA); St Cross College, Oxford (MSc)
- Occupation: Political consultant, actor, singer, historian

Víctor Andrés Marroquín-Merino Torres (born 1 November 1998) is a Peruvian political commentator, consultant, actor, singer, and historian. A ranking member of the Peruvian Aprista Party (APRA), he has been the party's National Secretary of International Relations since October 2026.

Born in Chicago and raised in Lima, Marroquín-Merino studied law at the University of Lima before turning to acting. He trained at the American Academy of Dramatic Arts in New York and graduated from New York University's Tisch School of the Arts before embarking in graduate studies at the University of Oxford, specializing in Latin American studies.

As a consultant, Marroquín-Merino co-founded a public affairs and political strategy firm, and served in Enrique Valderrama's campaign at the 2026 presidential election. He has appeared regularly as a political analyst on Peruvian media.

== Early life and education ==
Marroquín-Merino was born in Chicago to Peruvian parents, and moved with his family to Lima at the age of three. He attended Newton College, a British–Peruvian school in Lima, and later the Miraflores Adventist College, where he completed his secondary education.

He studied law at the University of Lima before turning to acting in 2018, training at the American Academy of Dramatic Arts (AADA) in New York under instructors including David Dean Bottrell and Timothy D. Stickney.

After completing an associate degree at AADA, he transferred to New York University's Tisch School of the Arts, where he earned a Bachelor of Fine Arts triple-majoring in theatre, politics, and history. His honors thesis, "Death, Memory, and Persuasion: Political Oratory as Performance in Latin America", supervised by artist-scholar Sebastián Calderón Bentín, examined political speech as performance, focusing on speeches by Jorge Eliécer Gaitán, Fidel Castro and Alan García. At NYU, he was a member of the College Democrats, and from 2022 to 2024, he worked as a journalist for the Peruvian digital newspaper Diario El Gobierno.

He then read for a MSc in Latin American Studies at the University of Oxford, as a member of St Cross College. While at Oxford, he was active in the Oxford Union and the Oxford University Conservative Association. He was first elected to the Union's Secretary's Committee for Hilary Term 2025, and subsequently to its Standing Committee for Trinity Term 2025, becoming, according to El Comercio, the first Peruvian elected to that body. In June 2025, he stood for Librarian, placing as the runner-up.

In May 2026, he sought the Oxford Union presidency in the re-run of the Hilary Term 2026 election, becoming the first Latin American to seek the Union presidency. He placed fourth in the election.

== Political career ==
=== Political consultant ===
After completing his studies at Oxford, Marroquín-Merino co-founded Apex Perú, a public affairs and political strategy firm.

Through the firm, he worked on Enrique Valderrama's campaign for the Peruvian Aprista Party in the 2026 presidential election as a senior advisor specializing in political communication. He also performed the campaign's theme song, "El APRA Es El Camino 2026", released in January 2026.

=== Political commentator and analyst ===
Marroquín-Merino has appeared in the media as a political commentator roughly since early 2024. On the fifth anniversary of the death of former president Alan García, he discussed García's legacy, and said he expected Enrique Valderrama to become a future leader of APRA despite resistance from the party's old guard. In August 2025, he discussed the removal of some 11,000 members from APRA's register, defending the request made by the party's legal representative, José Pimentel Aliaga, and attributing the party's internal problems to earlier decisions by its leadership under Mauricio Mulder in the party's political commission.

He has also appeared as a political analyst on Peruvian media. After the 2026 presidential election, he argued that votes from Peruvians abroad had been key to Keiko Fujimori's victory, and that Roberto Sánchez had remarkably failed to repeat Pedro Castillo's 2021 success against her. Commenting on Keiko Fujimori's political career, he said that Fujimori's persistence in politics was what had ultimately built her legitimacy. In July 2026, he criticized former presidential nominee Jorge Nieto, saying that after first appearing intent on securing Fujimori's governability, Nieto now seemed to want to form a parliamentary caucus with left-wing forces, showing signs of being "willing to sell himself to the highest bidder".

=== Party activity ===
Marroquín-Merino became involved with APRA at the age of twelve, when he began attending public-speaking classes at the party's headquarters, the Casa del Pueblo in Breña, Lima, and subsequently supported Alan García's 2016 presidential campaign. He registered as a full party member in 2021, and served as the party's Youth Secretary in La Molina District from 2023 to 2024.

He was part of the technical team of Enrique Valderrama's movement for renewal within APRA, leading its work on culture. Valderrama presented the 45-member team, with Culture among its policy areas, in July 2025. He also served as political advisor to Valderrama's campaign in the party's November 2025 presidential primary, which Valderrama won as he secured the party's presidential nomination.

In March 2026, Marroquín-Merino became APRA's general secretary for La Molina District, leading the party's grassroots organization there in the run-up to the April 2026 general election.

==== National Secretary of International Relations (2026–present) ====
Following the election of Mónica Yaya as APRA president at the party's XXVI National Congress in Trujillo in October 2026, Marroquín-Merino became the party's National Secretary of International Relations. In her first interview as party president, Yaya named him to the post and cited his studies abroad and his youth.

== Discography ==
Album

- Stages: From Peru to Broadway (2018)

Singles

- "Contigo Perú" (2021)
- "Seamos Leales" (2025, featuring Mochero Vásquez)
- "El APRA Es El Camino 2026" (2026)
