= Belén García Mendoza =

Peruvian politician

Institutional General Secretary of the Peruvian Aprista Party
- In office 24 October 2021 – 18 October 2026
- President: César Trelles
- Preceded by: Elías Rodríguez
- Succeeded by: Enrique Melgar Moscoso

Deputy Institutional General Secretary of the Peruvian Aprista Party
- In office 29 October 2019 – 24 October 2021
- President: César Trelles
- Preceded by: Manuel Zapata Vásquez
- Succeeded by: Carmen Vargas Palomino (2026)

Personal details
- Born: Belén Ysabel García Mendoza; 15 October 1977 (age 49) Ica, Peru
- Party: Peruvian Aprista Party
- Education: Saint Aloysius Gonzaga National University (LLB, LLM)

Belén Ysabel García Mendoza (born 15 October 1977) is a Peruvian politician. Originally from Ica, she ran unsuccessfully for a seat in the Peruvian Congress under the Popular Alliance electoral coalition; prior, she had two unsuccessful runs for the Ica Provincial Council, at the 2006 and 2010 municipal elections.

Originally elected in 2019 as Deputy Institutional General Secretary of the Peruvian Aprista Party, García rose through succession to the position of General Secretary in 2021 following former congressman Elías Rodríguez expelling for alleged treason from the party, as it was revealed Rodríguez had commenced the registration of his own regional movement while serving as national Institutional General Secretary.

García ran Jorge del Castillo's running mate alongside Mauricio Mulder as part of one of the tickets competing in the party's presidential primary for the 2026 general election, placing third in the primary and losing to Enrique Valderrama's ticket.

== Electoral history ==
=== Legislative ===
Election	Office	List	#	District	Votes			Result	Ref.
Election	Office	List	#	District	Total	%	P	Result	Ref.
2016	Member of Congress	Popular Alliance	2	Ica	8,759	9.94%	4th (Note: Presented on an electoral list. The data shown represents the share of the vote the entire party/alliance received in that constituency.)	Not elected	

=== Provincial ===
Election	Office	List	#	Votes			Result	Ref.
Election	Office	List	#	Total	%	P.	Result	Ref.
2006	Ica Province Councilwoman	Peruvian Aprista Party	8	42,192	25.53%	3rd (Note: Presented on an electoral list. The data shown represents the share of the vote the entire party/alliance received in that constituency.)	Not elected	
2010	Ica Province Councilwoman	Peruvian Aprista Party	3	23,885	13.43%	4th	Not elected	
