= Enrique Melgar Moscoso =

Peruvian politician

Institutional General Secretary of the Peruvian Aprista Party
- Incumbent
- Assumed office 18 October 2026
- President: Mónica Yaya
- Preceded by: Belén García Mendoza

National Secretary of Organization and Mobilization of the Peruvian Aprista Party
- In office 29 October 2019 – 18 October 2026
- President: César Trelles
- Preceded by: Miguel Rosas
- Succeeded by: Mochero Vásquez

Personal details
- Born: 5 May 1967 (age 59) Jesús María, Lima, Peru
- Party: Peruvian Aprista Party
- Education: Los Andes Peruvian University
- Occupation: Politician, businessman

Enrique Melgar Moscoso (born 5 May 1967) is a Peruvian politician, businessman and former public official based in Tacna, and the Institutional General Secretary of the Peruvian Aprista Party (APRA). He previously served as National Secretary of Organization and Mobilization, a seat on its national executive committee and national political commission, and has led the party in the Tacna Region.

Tied to the party since his youth, from 2008 he was one of the defendants in the criminal case over killings attributed to the Rodrigo Franco Command, a paramilitary group active during Alan García's first government; in December 2022 he was acquitted, while three other defendants were convicted.

== Early life and education ==
Melgar was born on 5 May 1967 in the Jesús María District of Lima. He graduated in law and political science from the Los Andes Peruvian University in 2011. He lives in Tacna, where he has also worked in business.

== Career ==
According to La República, Melgar worked for Agustín Mantilla at the Ministry of the Interior during the first presidency of Alan García (1985–1990).

By 2010, Melgar was APRA's regional general secretary in Tacna and head of the regional office of COFOPRI, the state agency for formalizing informal property. On 6 June 2010, he won the party's primary election as nominee for regional governor of Tacna, defeating Julio Alva Centurión, ahead of the 2010 regional election, but subsequently did not run. He was also a candidate for Congress in the 2016 general election under Popular Alliance. His tenure as the party's regional secretary in Tacna ended in October 2019.

At the XXV Party National Congress, Legar was elected to APRA's national executive committee as national secretary of organization and mobilization, serving under party president César Trelles. He served as campaign manager of presidential nominee Enrique Valderrama at the 2026 Peruvian general election.

After seven years as organization secretary, Melgar was elected Institutional General Secretary of the APRA at the XXVI Party National Congress held in Trujillo, Peru from 16 to 18 October 2026, succeeding Belén García Mendoza.

== Rodrigo Franco case ==
On 28 May 2008 judge Segismundo León Velasco opened criminal proceedings for crimes against humanity against former interior minister Agustín Mantilla, Jesús "Chito" Ríos Sáenz and nine others, including Melgar, over killings attributed to the Rodrigo Franco Command. The prosecution charged Melgar, together with Ríos, Jorge Huamán Alacute, Carlos Farfán Yacila, Óscar Urbina Sandoval, Gino Fiori Gonzales and Augusto Calleja Carrasco, as direct perpetrators of the kidnapping and murder of lawyer Manuel Febres Flores on 28 July 1988; Febres had been defending Shining Path leader Osmán Morote. In 2010 Melgar told La República that he was under a travel ban as a result of the case, that the proceedings had been opened after 20 years without any police or judicial action and relied on the testimony of an alleged deserter from the group, and that the accusations concerned events that "never existed".

The defendants challenged the proceedings through a habeas corpus petition filed by Mantilla in May 2011, which reached the Constitutional Court. The oral trial began on 27 May 2013 but was annulled and restarted more than once; Mantilla was removed from the case after his death in 2015. In 2019 prosecutors were seeking 25 years in prison and 200,000 soles in civil damages against Melgar.

On 14 December 2022, the Third Transitional National Liquidating Criminal Chamber (Tercera Sala Penal Superior Nacional Liquidadora Transitoria) issued its verdict. It sentenced Ríos, Huamán and Fiori to 15 years in prison for the murders of Febres, Saúl Cantoral and Consuelo García, and ordered their arrest. Melgar was acquitted.

== Electoral history ==
=== Legislative ===
Election	Office	List	#	District	Votes			Result	Ref.
Election	Office	List	#	District	Total	%	P.	Result	Ref.
2011	Member of Congress	Peruvian Aprista Party	6	Tacna	1,559	3.39%	3rd (Note: Presented on an electoral list. The data shown represents the share of the vote the entire party/alliance received in that constituency.)	Not elected	
2016	Member of Congress	Popular Alliance	7	Tacna	1,476	3.13%	5th	Not elected	

=== Andean Parliament ===
Election	Office	List	#	District	Votes			Result	Ref.
Election	Office	List	#	District	Total	%	P.	Result	Ref.
2026	Representative to the Andean Parliament	Peruvian Aprista Party	1	National	38,721	1.78%	12th (Note: Presented on an electoral list. The data shown represents the share of the vote the entire party/alliance received in that constituency.)	Not elected	
