= José Pimentel Aliaga =

Peruvian lawyer and politician

José Germán Pimentel Aliaga

Chairman of the National Political Commission of the Peruvian Aprista Party
- Incumbent
- Assumed office 18 October 2026
- President: Mónica Yaya
- Preceded by: Mauricio Mulder

Member of the National Political Commission of the Peruvian Aprista Party
- In office 29 October 2019 – 18 October 2026
- President: César Trelles

National Legal Representative of the Peruvian Aprista Party
- In office 18 March 2013 – 23 December 2025
- President: Alan García; César Trelles
- Deputy: Estefanía Huamán Ojeda
- Preceded by: Jaime Espinoza Montoya
- Succeeded by: Estefanía Huamán Ojeda (as deputy legal representative)

Personal details
- Born: José Germán Pimentel Aliaga; 18 March 1968 (age 58) Lima, Peru
- Party: Peruvian Aprista Party
- Education: Inca Garcilaso de la Vega University
- Occupation: Lawyer, politician

José Germán Pimentel Aliaga (born 18 March 1968) is a Peruvian lawyer and politician of the Peruvian Aprista Party (APRA), and the current Chairman of its National Political Commission. For several years he has been the party's chief legal representative (personero legal titular) before Peru's electoral authorities, and he led the filing that restored the party's registration in 2023. He has been described as a former lawyer of former president Alan García, and was an APRA candidate for mayor of La Molina District in 2006, for Congress in 2020 and for the Senate in 2026.

== Early life and education ==
Pimentel was born on 18 March 1968 in Lima, to a family from Huancayo. He studied law and political science at Inca Garcilaso de la Vega University from 1986 to 1992, obtaining his bachelor's degree, his licentiate and his professional title as a lawyer. He later took courses at the National School of Control of the Comptroller General of the Republic, on government auditing (2000, with a diploma in municipal management) and on the liability of public officials (2003), and pursued master's studies in criminal law.

== Professional career ==
Pimentel is a lawyer by profession. In 1989–1990, during Alan García's first government, he was director of planning for Region VIII (Huancayo) of the National Penitentiary Institute (INPE). In the private sector he was legal manager of Proconsul S.A. (1997–1999) and operations manager of Distribuidora Real (2002–2004). From 2000 to 2003 he presided over the Association of Lawyers of La Molina, and in 2005 he taught a professional-qualification course at the National University of San Marcos. According to Willax, he was also a lawyer for Alan García.

== Early party career ==
Pimentel's party posts date back to 1989, when he chaired APRA's electoral committee in the Ate District. He was a delegate to the party's XXII National Congress in 2004. In 2006 he directed the party's vote-protection effort at district level, served as APRA's alternate and then principal legal representative in the Ancash Region, and was a delegate to its regional convention.

== Party legal representative ==
By March 2013 Pimentel was APRA's chief legal representative before the National Jury of Elections (JNE), succeeding Jaime Espinoza Montoya; in December 2017 the JNE notified him of its recognition of the party's new leadership.

=== 2021 general election ===
Ahead of the 2021 general election, Pimentel was responsible for filing the party's candidate lists. When the deadline expired on the night of 22 December 2020, APRA had not registered its congressional lists in most electoral districts, including Lima. Party leaders blamed failures in the JNE's online registration system; Pimentel asked the electoral court to reopen the system so the lists could be completed, but the Lima Centro 1 Special Electoral Jury rejected the request, finding that he had waited until about an hour before the system closed. Carla García, the party's first-placed congressional candidate for Lima, called for his resignation; presidential candidate Nidia Vílchez said the party would assess the request. In January 2021 the JNE rejected the party's appeals for seven of the lists. It found that APRA had completed 28 lists in the online system but had formally submitted only four through the electronic filing system before it closed at midnight on 22 December, and that the rules had been clear since September 2020.

Years later, the Constitutional Court ruled in the party's favour. In a judgment of 27 April 2023, on a claim brought by one of APRA's would-be candidates with the party joined to the case, the court held by majority that the registration rules had been unclear about which step counted as submitting a list. It found that rejecting the party's request to reopen the system had violated the right to political participation, urged the electoral bodies not to repeat the conduct and ordered the JNE to pay costs. Because the 2021 election had long concluded, the court acknowledged that the harm had become irreparable, and its ruling had no effect on the result. It also stressed that parties have a duty to file their lists on time.

=== Re-registration of the party ===
APRA lost its registration after the 2021 election. On 7 September 2022 Pimentel filed the party's application for re-registration with the JNE's Registry of Political Organizations. In March 2023 he announced that the last challenge to the application had been dismissed, calling the outcome final after "a year and a half of work". After the party was registered, he was listed as a member of its Political Commission and spoke of preparing a "mix of experience and youth" for the 2026 election.

=== Removal, reinstatement and the 11,000 affiliations ===
In May 2023, Mauricio Mulder opted to remove Pimentel as its legal representative and asked the registry to register Juan Mejía Seminario in his place, also removing future presidential nominee Enrique Valderrama, Moisés Tambini del Valle and Antonio Mauricio Alor from the National Political Commission. Pimentel challenged the removals before the registry and the courts and was reinstated by JNE Resolution 0174-2025. He then asked that the acts carried out under his replacement be declared void, which led to about 11,000 party affiliations made during that period, including that of former prime minister Javier Velásquez, being struck from the register. Veteran party leaders criticised his role, and a former head of the registry said Pimentel had perhaps not weighed the consequences of his request. In September 2025 the JNE restored the affiliations.

== National Political Commission chairmanship ==
At the XXVI Party National Congress held in Trujillo, Peru from 16 to 18 October 2026, Pimentel was elected Chairman of the National Political Commission.

== Candidacies ==
In the 2006 municipal elections, Pimentel was APRA's candidate for mayor of La Molina District in Lima, where he had lived for about 20 years. He finished fifth with 8.36% of the vote.

In December 2019 the JNE allowed his candidacy for APRA in the January 2020 parliamentary election to proceed, together with those of Nidia Vílchez and others, after the party's appeal against a ruling of an electoral jury.

For the 2026 general election, Pimentel was one of the members of the party's Political Commission who approved the designated candidates, a decision disputed by Jorge del Castillo. In January 2026 a challenge was filed against his own pre-candidacy, alleging that he could not be a candidate while serving as the party's legal representative. He ran for the Senate, campaigning on reform of the law on political parties. APRA failed to pass the electoral threshold in April 2026 and won no seats.

=== District ===
Election	Office	List	Votes			Result	Ref.
Election	Office	List	Total	%	P.	Result	Ref.
1998	Mayor of La Molina District	Peruvian Aprista Party	6,896	8.36%	5th (Note: Presented on an electoral list. The data shown represents the share of the vote the entire party/alliance received in that constituency.)	Not elected	
