= 2026 Lima municipal election =

Local election in Peru

- 4 October 2026
- Reporting: 92.73% as of 12:00 UTC−05:00
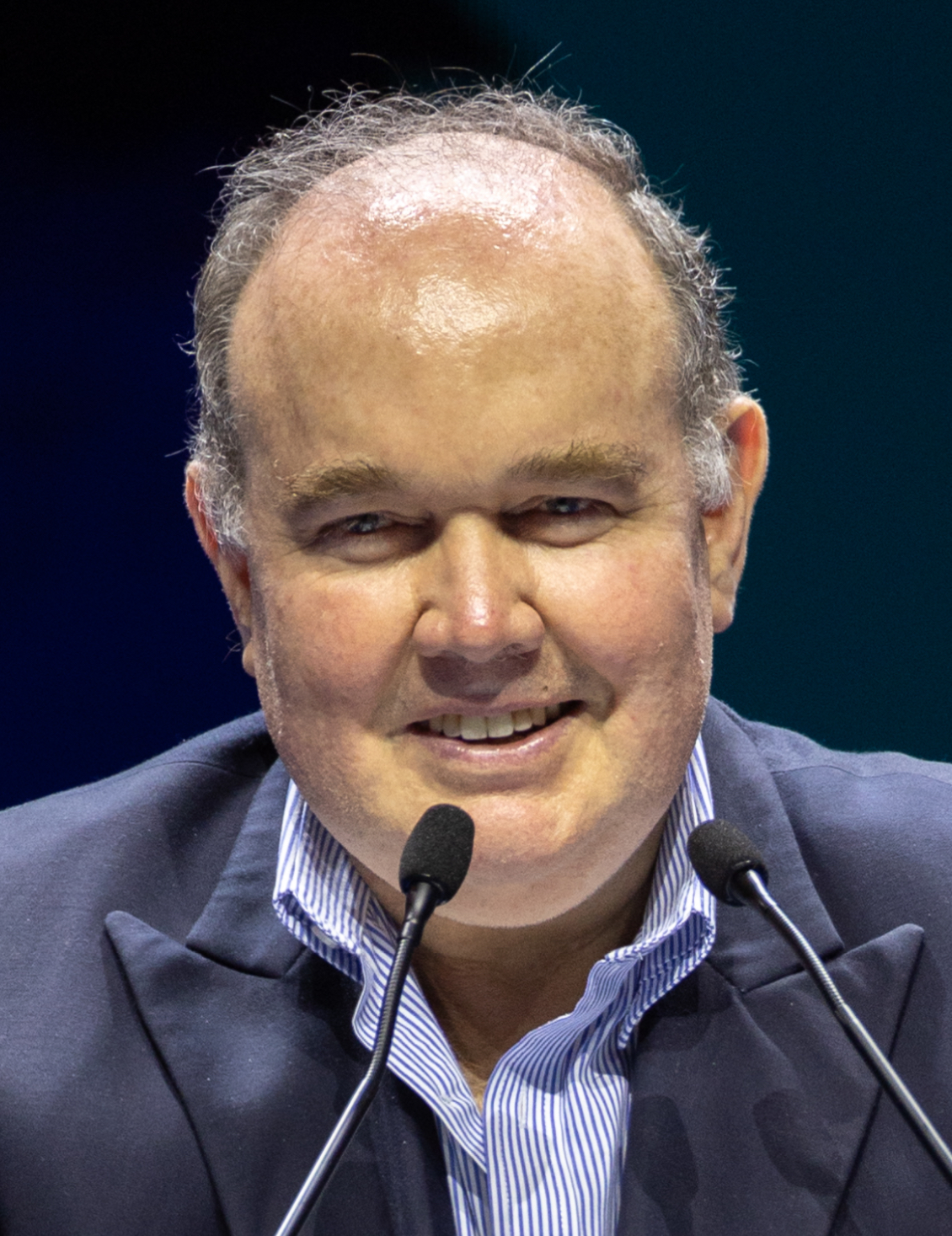

Nominee	Rafael López Aliaga	Francis Allison	Carlos Bruce
Party	RP	Avanza País	We Are Peru
Popular vote	1,478,529	1,438,551	812,642
Percentage	27.71%	26.84%	15.09%
Mayor before election
Renzo Reggiardo
RP
Elected Mayor
TBD

The 2026 Lima municipal election was held on 4 October 2026, alongside regional and municipal elections throughout Peru, following their convening by President José Jerí on 7 January 2026. Voters in Lima Province elected the Metropolitan Mayor of Lima and all 39 members of the Metropolitan Council for the 2027–2030 term, choosing between closed party lists of 40 candidates each (one mayoral candidate and 39 council candidates).

Incumbent mayor Renzo Reggiardo took office on 13 October 2025, succeeding Rafael López Aliaga, who resigned to seek the presidency. Reggiardo's term ends on 31 December 2026; he has ruled out seeking a further term, and Peruvian law in any case bars immediate mayoral re-election.

== Background ==
The Metropolitan Municipality of Lima governs Lima Province, which is not part of any of Peru's 25 regions and is administered separately. Its mayor and 39 councillors (regidores) serve concurrent four-year terms and are elected on a single closed and blocked list; seats are allocated to the winning list under a majority bonus rule, with remaining seats distributed among the other lists by the D'Hondt method.

Rafael López Aliaga, who had governed Lima since 1 January 2023, resigned the mayoralty on 13 October 2025 to pursue a presidential bid in the 2026 Peruvian general election; he was succeeded by his lieutenant mayor, Renzo Reggiardo.

In August 2026, Popular Renewal's registered mayoral candidate, Luis Rubio, withdrew his candidacy, leaving the party without a formal mayoral nominee; López Aliaga, listed as the party's first council candidate, became its de facto standard-bearer for the mayoralty. Perú Libre is contesting the mayoralty in a similar position, headed on its list by Yuri Castro Romero as first council candidate rather than a formal mayoral nominee.

== Candidates ==
As of September 2026, 24 political organizations have registered mayoral candidates, with two additional parties (Popular Renewal and Free Peru) contesting without a formal mayoral nominee, as noted above.

Party	Logo	Mayoral nominee	Lieutenant nominee
Popular Action; Leader: Julio Chavez Chiong		Alberto Tejada	Pedro Gamio Aita
Ahora Nación; Leader: Alfonso López Chau		Susel Paredes	Magaly Blas Blas
Venceremos; Leader: Ronald Atencio		Juan Carlos Alvarado Mestanza	Julio César Magán Zevallos
Alliance for Progress; Leader: César Acuña Peralta		Elio Riera Garro	Jorge Delgado Monteblanco
Go on Country - Social Integration Party; Leader: Aldo Borrero Rojas		Francis Allison	Ivonne Tapia Vivas
Battle Peru; Leader: Zósimo Cárdenas Muje		Samir Quispe Caballero	Max Márquez Villavicencio
Green Land Transformative Coalition; Leader: Javier Arce Alvarado		Yehude Simon	Ricardo Pareja Fonseca
Agricultural People's Front of Peru; Leader: Jonás Ataucusi Molina		Segundo Valdez Zavala	Maurilio Llance Andía
Citizen Force; Leader: Milagros Tuesta Muñoz		Rubén Bonilla Espinoza	María Lupe Ríos de Salazar
Popular Force; Leader: Keiko Fujimori		Samuel Daza	Olga Johnson Feliu
Together for Peru; Leader: Roberto Sánchez		Oswaldo Vargas Cuéllar	Juan Antonio Sánchez Gutiérrez
Peruvian Aprista Party; Leader: César Trelles		Mónica Yaya	José Alejandro Pimentel Santiváñez
Civic Party OBRAS; Leader: Ricardo Belmont		Ricardo Belmont	Harold Forsyth
Party of Good Government; Leader: Jorge Nieto		Carlos Gallardo Neyra	Sury Solís Sulca
Democratic Green Party; Leader: Álex Gonzales		Flor de María Hurtado Valdez	Diego Lay Hurtado
We Are Peru; Leader: Patricia Li Sotelo		Carlos Bruce	Vicente Romero Fernández
Front of Hope 2021; Leader: Fernando Olivera		Elizabeth León Chinchay	José Daniel Mallma Huaraca
Purple Party; Leader: Luis Durán Rojo		Victoria La Cruz Garcés	José Carlos Soldevilla Saavedra
Patriotic Party of Peru; Leader: Herbert Caller Gutiérrez		Sandro Caller Gutiérrez	Hebert Caller Gutiérrez
Free Peru; Leader: Vladimir Cerrón		Rubén Ramírez Mateo (dropped out)	Yuri Castro Romero
Conscience People; Leader: Guido Bellido		Luis Alberto Huette Tolentino	Enrique Esperguez Beltrán
Christian People's Party; Leader: Carlos Neuhaus Tudela		Edgardo de Pomar Vizcarra	Sofía Aguayo Morales (dropped-out)
We Can Peru; Leader: José Luna		Daniel Urresti	Arón Espinoza Velarde
Progresemos; Leader: Paul Jaimes Blanco		Luis Miguel Llanos Carrillo	Gianella Arauco Chávez
Popular Renewal Peru; Leader: Rafael López Aliaga		Luis Rubio Idrógo (dropped-out)	Rafael López Aliaga
Vision Peru; Leader: Mauricio Rabanal Torres		Santiago Abarca León	Carlos Enrique Oliva Arévalo

== Opinion polling ==
An Ipsos poll conducted 5–6 August 2026 (n=502) showed Rafael López Aliaga leading voting intention at 21%, followed by Carlos Bruce (Somos Perú) at 13%, Francis Allison (Avanza País) at 9%, and Daniel Urresti (Podemos Perú) at 7%, with 21% undecided.

A follow-up Ipsos/Perú21 poll conducted 11–14 September 2026 (n=1,200) found that, in the event a party without a registered mayoral candidate wins, 54% of respondents believed its second council candidate should become mayor, while 38% believed the first council candidate (i.e. López Aliaga, for Renovación Popular) should assume the office; separately, 53% said López Aliaga specifically should not become mayor under this scenario, against 40% who supported it.

=== Voting simulations ===
Pollster/ Client	Date	Sample size																Other	Blank/ None
Pollster/ Client	Date	Sample size	López Aliaga	Bruce	Allison	Urresti	Daza	Paredes	Tejada	Riera	Vargas	Valdez	Gallardo	Belmont	Castro	León	Yaya	Other	Blank/ None
Pollster/ Client	Date	Sample size	RP-Perú	SP	AvP	PP	FP	AN	AP	APP	JP	FREPAP	PBG	OBRAS	PL	FE2021	APRA	Other	Blank/ None
Ipsos Perú/Perú21 (Valid votes)	24–25 Sep 2026	780	30.0	15.6	15.1	8.7	6.7	3.4	3.1	2.4	2.3	–	2.6	3.0	–	–	–	7.1	N/A
Ipsos Perú/Perú21 (Cast votes)	24–25 Sep 2026	780	26.1	13.5	13.1	7.6	5.9	3.0	2.7	2.1	2.0	–	2.2	2.6	–	–	–	6.2	13
Datum Internacional/El Comercio (Valid votes)	23–25 Sep 2026	600	29.6	17.2	13.0	7.1	6.3	2.7	4.0	4.4	3.8	0.4	1.7	2.1	0.2	1.5	0.6	5.7 (Note: Including Luis Miguel Llanos Carrillo at 1.5%, Edgardo de Pomar Vizcarra at 1.0%, Juan Carlos Alvarado Mestanza at 0.6%, Luis Huette Tolentino at 0.6%, Santiago Abarca León at 0.6%, Flor de María Hurtado Valdez at 0.6%, Yehude Simon Munaro at 0.4%, Victoria La Cruz Garcés at 0.2%, Sandro Caller Gutiérrez at 0.2%, and Yuri Castro Romero at 0.2%.)	N/A
Datum Internacional/El Comercio (Cast votes)	23–25 Sep 2026	600	25.8	15.0	11.3	6.2	5.5	2.3	3.5	3.8	3.3	0.3	1.5	1.8	0.2	1.3	0.5	5.0 (Note: Including Luis Miguel Llanos Carrillo at 1.3%, Edgardo de Pomar Vizcarra at 0.8%, Juan Carlos Alvarado Mestanza at 0.5%, Luis Huette Tolentino at 0.5%, Santiago Abarca León at 0.5%, Flor de María Hurtado Valdez at 0.5%, Yehude Simon Munaro at 0.3%, Victoria La Cruz Garcés at 0.2%, Sandro Caller Gutiérrez at 0.2%, and Yuri Castro Romero at 0.2%.)	12.7
CPI/RPP (Valid votes)	20–25 Sep 2026	4426	31.0	17.4	11.9	8.6	5.5	4.1	2.9	4.3	1.9	1.2	1.8	2.2	–	–	1.3	5.9	N/A
CPI/RPP (Cast votes)	20–25 Sep 2026	4426	27.2	15.2	10.4	7.5	4.8	3.6	2.6	3.7	1.7	1.1	1.6	1.9	–	–	1.1	5.2	12.3
Datum Internacional/El Comercio (Valid votes)	15–17 Sep 2026	600	28.4	18.2	11.3	5.8	7.1	3.6	3.6	4.8	3.6	2.1	–	–	–	–	–	11.5	N/A
Datum Internacional/El Comercio (Cast votes)	15–17 Sep 2026	600	24.7	15.8	9.8	5.0	6.2	3.2	3.2	4.2	3.2	1.8	1.7	1.5	1.2	1.0	0.8	3.5 (Note: Including Victoria La Cruz Garcés at 0.7%, Luis Huette Tolentino at 0.5%, Edgardo de Pomar Vizcarra at 0.5%, Flor de María Hurtado Valdez at 0.5%, Yehude Simon Munaro at 0.5%, Sandro Caller Gutiérrez at 0.2%, Santiago Abarca León at 0.2%, Luis Miguel Llanos Carrillo at 0.2%, and Rubén Bonilla Espinoza at 0.2%.)	13.2

== Results ==
=== Metropolitan Municipality of Lima ===
95.42% reporting
Candidate	Party	Votes	%	Seats	+/–
Rafael López Aliaga	Popular Renewal	1,489,360	27.78	21	0
Francis Allison	Avanza País	1,438,122	26.82	9	+9
Carlos Bruce	We Are Peru	812,948	15.16	5	0
Daniel Urresti	Podemos Perú	427,054	7.96	2	-5
Elio Riera Garro	Alliance for Progress	230,621	4.30	1	-1
Susel Paredes	Ahora Nación	190,973	3.56	1	New
Samuel Daza	Popular Force	140,271	2.62	0	New
Alberto Tejada	Popular Action	129,522	2.42	0	New
Oswaldo Vargas Cuéllar	Together for Peru	100,302	1.87	0	-1
Ricardo Belmont	Civic Party OBRAS	85,324	1.59	0	New
Segundo Valdez Zavala	Agricultural People's Front of Peru	49,099	0.92	0	0
Luis Miguel Llanos Carrillo	Progresemos	48,051	0.90	0	New
Elizabeth León Chinchay	Front of Hope 2021	39,028	0.73	0	-3
Carlos Gallardo Neyra	Party of Good Government	35,424	0.66	0	New
Mónica Yaya	Peruvian Aprista Party	27,081	0.51	0	New
Edgardo de Pomar Vizcarra	Christian People's Party	25,081	0.47	0	New
Flor de María Hurtado Valdez	Democratic Green Party	20,139	0.38	0	New
Victoria La Cruz Garcés	Purple Party	16,275	0.30	0	New
Rubén Ramírez Mateo	Free Peru	14,455	0.27	0	0
Juan Carlos Alvarado Mestanza	Venceremos	9,907	0.18	0	New
Sandro Caller Gutiérrez	Patriotic Party of Peru	9,744	0.18	0	New
Yehude Simon	Green Land Transformative Coalition	7,077	0.13	0	New
Santiago Abarca León	Vision Peru	4,449	0.08	0	New
Rubén Bonilla Espinoza	Citizen Force	4,424	0.08	0	New
Luis Alberto Huette Tolentino	Conscience People	3,775	0.07	0	New
Samir Quispe Caballero	Battle Peru	3,643	0.07	0	New
Total		5,362,149	100.00	39	0
Valid votes		5,362,149	92.49		
Invalid votes		300,936	5.19		
Blank votes		134,301	2.32		
Total votes		5,797,386	100.00		
Registered voters/turnout		7,875,528	73.61		

== See also ==
- 2026 Peruvian regional and municipal elections
- 2022 Lima municipal election
- Metropolitan Municipality of Lima
