= Benigno Chirinos =

Peruvian labor union leader and politician (born 1950)

Benigno Hildebrando Chirinos Sotelo

Political General Secretary of the Peruvian Aprista Party
- In office 9 July 2017 – 18 October 2026
- President: Alan García; César Trelles
- Preceded by: Jorge del Castillo
- Succeeded by: Luciano Ponce

Senator of the Republic
- In office 26 July 1990 – 5 April 1992
- Constituency: National

Personal details
- Born: Benigno Hildebrando Chirinos Sotelo; 29 May 1950 (age 76) Lima, Peru
- Party: Peruvian Aprista Party
- Occupation: Union leader

Benigno Hildebrando Chirinos Sotelo (born 29 May 1950) is a Peruvian labor union leader and politician. He currently leads the Workers Confederation of Peru and served as Political General Secretary of the Peruvian Aprista Party from 2017 to 2026.

In 1990, Chirinos was elected to the Peruvian Senate. He served until 1992 following Alberto Fujimori's self-coup, which effectively dissolved congress. He never attained public office again.

Party political offices
| Preceded by Jorge del Castillo | Political General Secretary of the Peruvian Aprista Party; 2017-2026 | Succeeded by Luciano Ponce |
