= Mochero Vásquez =

Peruvian writer and activist

Lucio Antonio Vásquez
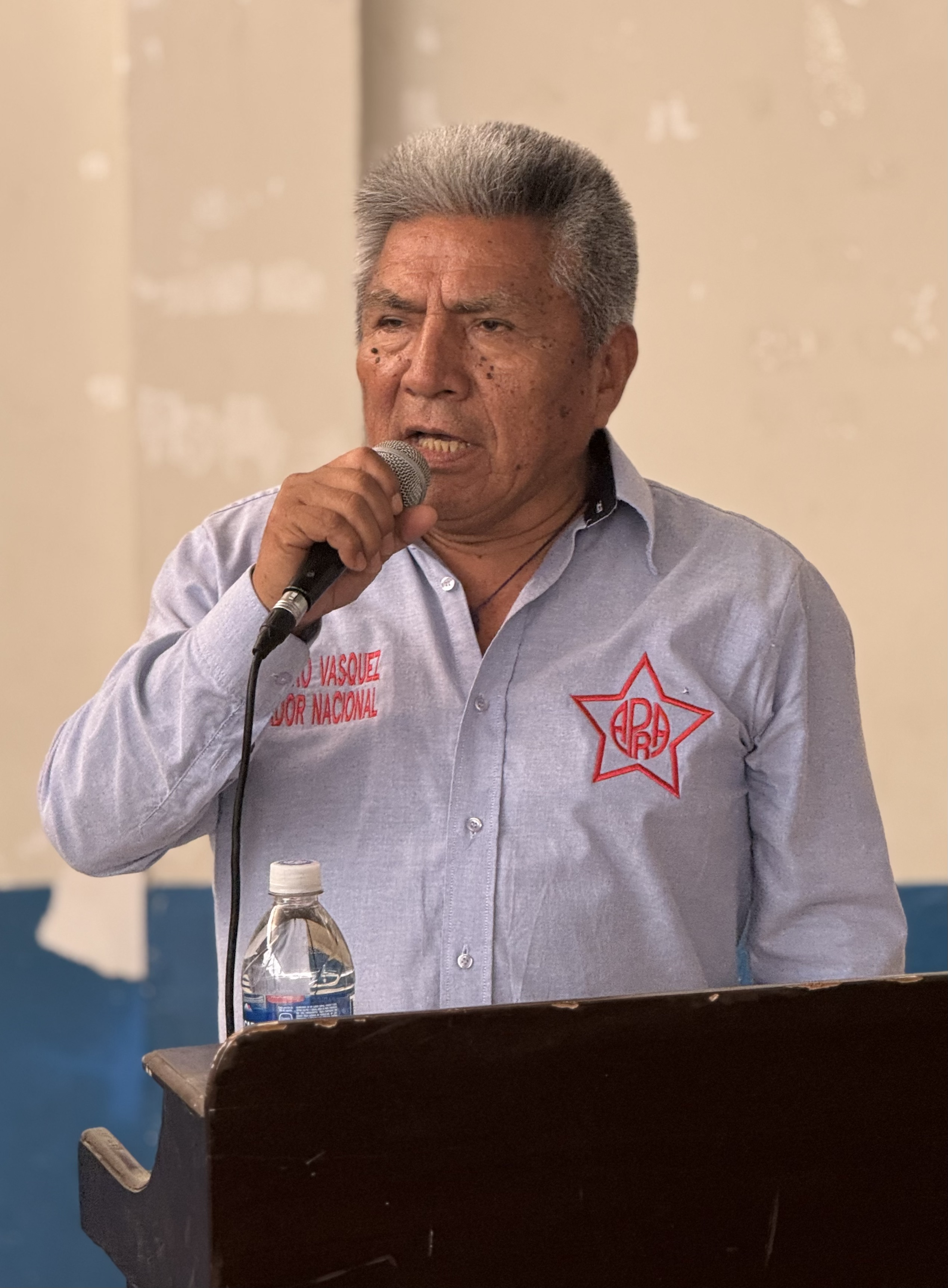
- In 2025 at the APRA’s Piura branch

National Secretary of Organization and Mobilization of the Peruvian Aprista Party
- Incumbent
- Assumed office 18 October 2026
- President: Mónica Yaya
- Preceded by: Enrique Melgar Moscoso

Member of the Comas District Council
- In office 1 January 2003 – 31 December 2006

Personal details
- Born: Lucio Antonio Vásquez Sánchez; 25 June 1952 (age 74) Moche, Trujillo, Peru
- Party: Peruvian Aprista Party
- Children: 4
- Education: National University of Cajamarca; Federico Villarreal National University
- Occupation: Writer; historian
- Nickname: Mochero

Lucio Antonio “Mochero” Vásquez Sánchez (born 25 June 1952) is a Peruvian writer, historian, and political activist. A ranking member of the Peruvian Aprista Party, he acted in his youth as bodyguard to Víctor Raúl Haya de la Torre, an experience that allowed him to become one of the most respected party historians and biographers of the party’s founder. He currently serves in the party's national executive committee as Secretary of Organization and Mobilization since 2026.

Born in Trujillo and raised in the northern parts of Peru, Vásquez studied sociology at the National University of Cajamarca, where he served as departamental leader. Once settled in Lima assigned to Haya de la Torre, he studied law and political science at the Federico Villarreal National University, before embarking on a career in writing and party activism.

On 12 October 2025, APRA presidential hopeful Enrique Valderrama announced Vásquez as his running mate alongside historian María Inés Valdivia in the presidential primary in order to run for the party’s presidential nomination for the 2026 Peruvian general election. He was confirmed as second vice presidential nominee as Valderrama’s ticket narrowly secured the nomination at the primary election held on 30 November 2025.

== Published works ==
- Haciendo Memoria (2018).
- Víctor Raúl Maestro del Siglo XXI (2022).
- Docencia y Decencia (with Roque Benavides), Debate (2024).
- Leyenda y Legado (with Roque Benavides), Debate (2024).

== Electoral history ==
=== Executive ===
| Election | Office | List | Votes | | | Result | Ref. |
| Election | Office | List | Total | % | P. | Result | Ref. |
|---|---|---|---|---|---|---|---|
| 2026 | Second Vice President of Peru | Peruvian Aprista Party | 161,248 | 0.96% | 14th | Not elected | |

=== Legislative ===
| Election | Office | List | # | District | Votes | | | Result | Ref. |
| Election | Office | List | # | District | Total | % | P. | Result | Ref. |
|---|---|---|---|---|---|---|---|---|---|
| 2026 | Senator of the Republic | Peruvian Aprista Party | 8 | National | 1,856 | 1.71% | 12th (Note: Presented on an electoral list. The data shown represents the share of the vote the entire party/alliance received in that constituency.) | Not elected | |

=== Municipal ===
| Election | Office | List | # | Votes | | | Result | Ref. |
| Election | Office | List | # | Total | % | P. | Result | Ref. |
|---|---|---|---|---|---|---|---|---|
| 2002 | Comas District Councilman | Peruvian Aprista Party | 1 | 19,647 | 9.09% | 4th | Elected | |
