= Miraflores Adventist College =

- Colegio Adventista Miraflores

Location
- Av. Comandante Espinar 750; Miraflores, Lima 15074; Peru

Information
- Former names: Industrial College (1919-1925); Industrial Institute (1925-1944); Union College (1944-1946); Private Adventist Educational Centre Miraflores Union (1948-1953)
- Type: Private co-educational
- Religious affiliation: Seventh-day Adventist Church
- Established: 1919 (as Industrial College); 1953 (as Miraflores Adventist College)
- Principal: Fernando Querevalu
- Faculty: 45
- Grades: 7-11
- Enrollment: 500 approx.
- Colours: Navy blue and white
- Song: Himno del Colegio Miraflores
- Accreditation: UGEL 07 (Ministry of Education)
- Newspaper: Impacto Estudiantil (2014)
- Affiliation: ASEACES (Asociación Educativa Adventista Central Sur)
- Website: http://www.aseaces.edu.pe

The Miraflores Adventist Educational Institution (commonly known as Miraflores Adventist College, or CoAM for its Spanish acronym) (Spanish: Institución Educativa Adventista Miraflores — Colegio Adventista Miraflores) is a private co-educational Seventh-day Adventist high school located in the urban district of Miraflores, Lima, Peru. Established in 1919 by representatives of the General Conference of the Seventh-day Adventist Church as Industrial College, the college is part of the Seventh-day Adventist education system, the world's second largest Christian school system.

== Notable alumni ==
- Walter Manrique Pacheco – educator; former Member of Congress (2000-2001)
- Rubén Castillo Anchapuri – theologist and biologist; first President of the Peruvian Union University
- Carlos Augusto Vela – musician; Head of the Superior Section of the National University of Music
- Andy Icochea Icochea – musician; Director of the Vienna Boys' Choir (2005-2011) and Artistic Director of PALS Children Chorus, USA
- Víctor Andrés Marroquín-Merino – actor, political consultant, and historian; Secretary of International Relations of the Peruvian Aprista Party

== See also ==
- List of Seventh-day Adventist secondary schools
- Seventh-day Adventist education
