= Regional Government of Piura =

Regional government in Peru

- Gobierno Regional de Piura

Regional Government overview
- Formed: January 1, 2003; 22 years ago
- Jurisdiction: Department of Piura
- Website: Government site

The Regional Government of Piura (Spanish: Gobierno Regional de Piura; GORE Piura) is the regional government that represents the Department of Piura. It is the body with legal identity in public law and its own assets, which is in charge of the administration of provinces of the department in Peru. Its purpose is the social, cultural and economic development of its constituency. It is based in the city of Piura.

== List of representatives ==
| Governor | Political party | Period |
|---|---|---|
| César Trelles | APRA | January 1, 2003–December 31, 2006 |
| César Trelles | APRA | January 1, 2007–December 31, 2010 |
| Javier Atkins Lerggios | Unidos Construyendo | January 1, 2011–December 31, 2014 |
| Reynaldo Hilbck | Unión Democrática del Norte | January 1, 2015–December 31, 2018 |
| Servando García | Movimiento Independiente Fuerza Regional | January 1, 2019–December 31, 2022 |
| Luis Neyra León | Contigo Región | January 1, 2023–Incumbent |

== See also ==
- Regional Governments of Peru
- Department of Piura
