= Omar Quesada =

Peruvian lawyer and politician

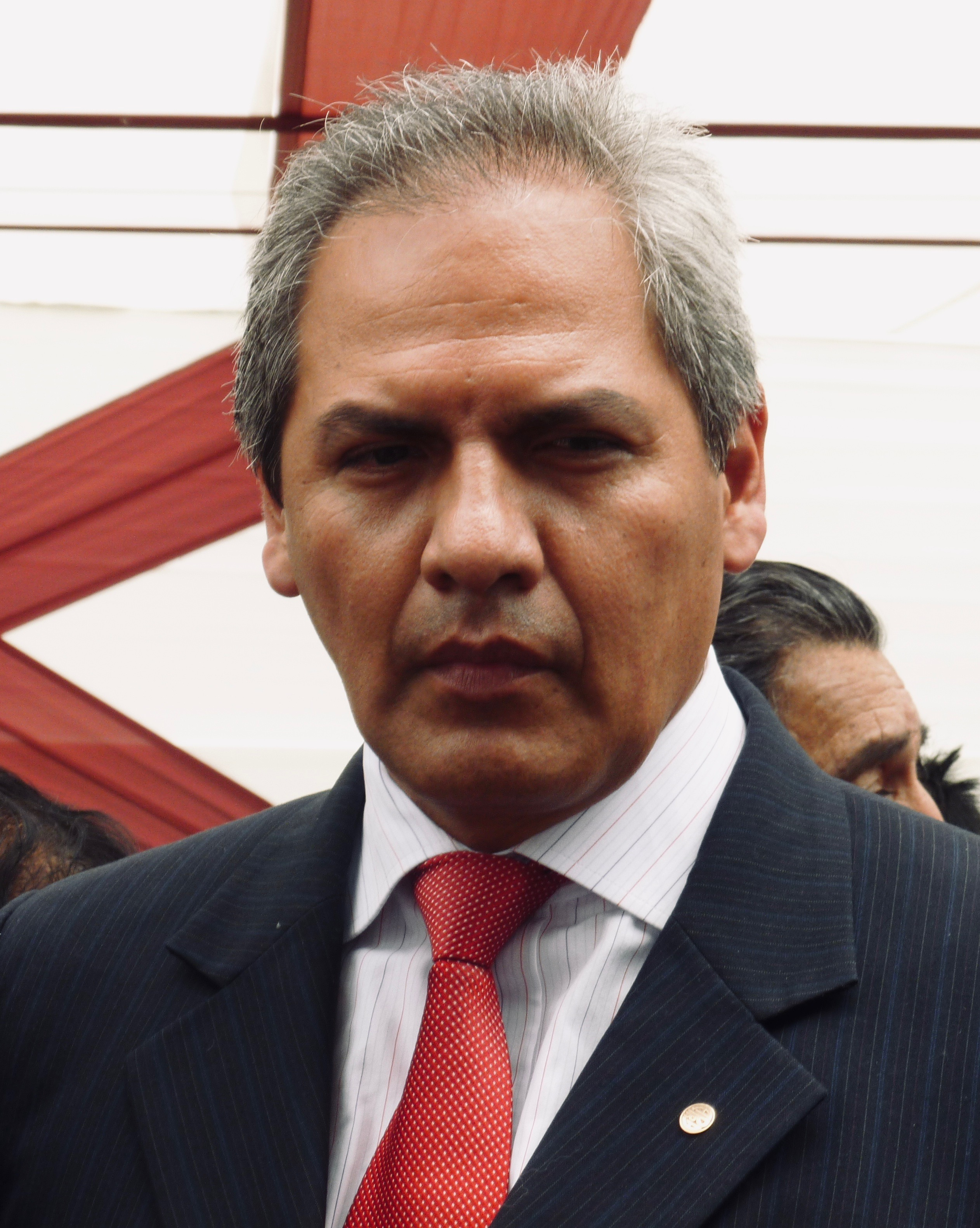
- Omar Quesada Martínez

Institutional General Secretary of the Peruvian Aprista Party
- In office March 5, 2010 – July 8, 2017
- President: Alan García
- Deputy: Javier Morán
- Preceded by: Mauricio Mulder
- Succeeded by: Elías Rodríguez

Director of the Informal Property Formalization Agency Ministry of Housing, Construction and Sanitation
- In office 2007 – April 24, 2010
- President: Alan García
- Minister: Enrique Cornejo; Juan Sarmiento Soto
- Succeeded by: David Alfonso Ramos López (Acting as Deputy Minister of Housing and Urbanism)

1st Governor of Ayacucho
- In office January 1, 2003 – December 31, 2006
- Lieutenant: José Antonio Urquizo
- Preceded by: Office created
- Succeeded by: Ernesto Molina Chávez

Mayor of Huanta
- In office 1 March 1993 – 31 December 1995
- Preceded by: Jorge Gonzales Alonso Rey Sánchez
- Succeeded by: Milton Córdova La Torre

Personal details
- Born: Werner Omar Quesada Martínez; 24 September 1965 (age 60) Trujillo, La Libertad, Peru
- Party: Peruvian Aprista Party
- Education: Universidad de San Martín de Porres (LLB)

Werner Omar Quesada Martínez (born 24 September 1965) is a Peruvian lawyer and politician. A ranking member of the Peruvian Aprista Party, he served as the party's Institutional General Secretary from March 2010 to July 2017.

His career has been marked by controversy. Raised in the Ayacucho Region, he served as a regional party leader throughout his youth, becoming the first democratically elected governor of Ayacucho, from 2003 to 2006. In the second presidency of Alan García, he was appointed as Director of the Informal Property Formalization Agency (COFOPRI), an agency dependent of the Ministry of Housing. Upon the revelation of irregular property selling conceded by the agency, he was forced to tender his resignation in April 2010.

== Early life and education ==
Born in the northern city of Trujillo, La Libertad, Quesada was raised in Huanta, Ayacucho. From a very young age, he registered himself in the Peruvian Aprista Party. After finishing his high school education at María Auxiliadora Grand School Unity in 1981, he travelled to Lima in order enroll in the Universidad de San Martín de Porres to study law. He was able to finish his law degree in 1996.

Simultaneously with his college education, Quesada served in a variety of positions within the Peruvian Aprista Party's Regional Committee. In 1985, he rose to the position of Deputy Regional General Secretary of the party in Ayacucho, and Provincial General Secretary for Huanta from 1992 to 1993.

== Political career ==
=== Early political career ===
Simultaneously with his college education, Quesada served in a variety of positions within the Peruvian Aprista Party's Regional Committee. In 1985, he rose to the position of Deputy Regional General Secretary of the party in Ayacucho, and Provincial General Secretary for Huanta from 1992 to 1993.

In 1999, the party National Convention elected Quesada as Secretary of Organization, serving in the position until his election as Ayacucho's first democratically elected governor.

Elected Mayor of the province of Huanta in 1993, he lost reelection in 1995. In the 2002 regional elections, he was elected as the first Governor of Ayacucho. He failed to attain reelection in 2006 regional elections.

=== Second García Administration ===
In 2007, he was appointed by the Alan García's administration as Director of the Informal Property Formalization Agency (COFOPRI). During his tenure, he was subject to controversy amidst irregularities in his management of the government agency, being accused of allowing a property in southern Lima to be sold for US$1750. A case was opened against him and six other agency officials. He resigned on 24 April 2010.

=== Institutional General Secretary of the APRA ===
Upon his resignation from COFOPRI, Quesada was elected at the party's 2010 National Convention as Institutional Secretary General, alongside Jorge Del Castillo as Political Secretary General. In his seven-year tenure in the party leadership, he oversaw the ceremonies for the American Popular Revolutionary Alliance's 90th Anniversary in 2014.

At the 2016 general election, he was slated to run for a seat in the Andean Parliament with the Popular Alliance list. At the same time, Quesada dealt with the Christian People's Party on sealing negotiations in order to confirm the electoral coalition with his party and Alan García's presidential nomination. Upon the election results, he was not elected to the Andean Parliament and announced the dissolution of the coalition on 11 April 2016, following the poor results attained by the presidential ticket.

Quesada served as Institutional General Secretary until the 2017 convention elected his successor, three-term congressman Elías Rodríguez.

== Electoral history ==
=== Legislative ===
Election	Office	List	#	District	Votes			Result	Ref.
Election	Office	List	#	District	Total	%	P.	Result	Ref.
2000	Member of Congress	Peruvian Aprista Party	15	National	8,055	5.56%	5th (Note: Presented on an electoral list. The data shown represents the share of the vote the entire party/alliance received in that constituency.)	Not elected	
2001	Member of Congress	Peruvian Aprista Party	1	Ayacucho	14,232	16.33%	3rd	Not elected	
2011	Member of Congress	Peruvian Aprista Party	1	Ayacucho	6,618	4.77%	5th	Not elected	

=== Andean Parliament ===
Election	Office	List	#	District	Votes			Result	Ref.
Election	Office	List	#	District	Total	%	P.	Result	Ref.
2016	Representative to the Andean Parliament	Peruvian Aprista Party	2	National	106,862	8.14%	4th (Note: Presented on an electoral list. The data shown represents the share of the vote the entire party/alliance received in that constituency.)	Not elected	

=== Regional ===
Election	Office	List	Votes			Result	Ref.
Election	Office	List	Total	%	P.	Result	Ref.
2002	Governor of Ayacucho	Peruvian Aprista Party	43,996	22.97%	1st	Elected	
2006	Governor of Ayacucho	Peruvian Aprista Party	44,058	18.93%	2nd	Not elected	
2018	Governor of Ayacucho	Peruvian Aprista Party	6,289	2.21%	9th	Not elected	

=== Municipal ===
Election	Office	List	Votes			Result	Ref.
Election	Office	List	Total	%	P.	Result	Ref.
1993	Mayor of Huanta	Peruvian Aprista Party	1,563	28.04%	1st	Elected	
1998	Mayor of Huanta	Peruvian Aprista Party	5,016	25.55%	2nd	Not elected	
