= Chuluncayani Adventist University =

Adventist university in Peru

Chuluncayani Adventist University, named in Spanish as Universidad Chuluncayani Adventista, is a small private university and a campus of Peruvian Union University. It is found near the city of Puno on the edge of Lake Titicaca, a major tourist destination of Peru. The university is affiliated with the Seventh-day Adventist Church, being one of two Adventist universities in Peru. It is a part of the Seventh-day Adventist education system, the world's second largest Christian school system.

== See also ==
- List of Seventh-day Adventist colleges and universities
- Seventh-day Adventist education
