= Francis Allison =

Peruvian politician and lawyer

Francis Allison Oyague

Francis James Allison Oyague is a Peruvian lawyer and politician who has been mayor of Magdalena del Mar, Peru, since 2022. He has previously served in this post from 2003 to 2009 and from 2011 to 2018. Additionally, he served as the Minister of Housing, Construction, and Sanitation of Peru from June to September 2009.

Allison is currently a candidate for Mayor of Lima in the 2026 municipal elections.

== Early life ==
Allison was born in the district of Miraflores, Lima, on March 1, 1970. He studied law at the University of San Martin de Porres and later criminal law at the University of Salamanca.

== Political career ==
Allison was first elected mayor of Magdalena del Mar in 2002.
