= Mauricio Mulder =

Peruvian politician, lawyer and former journalist

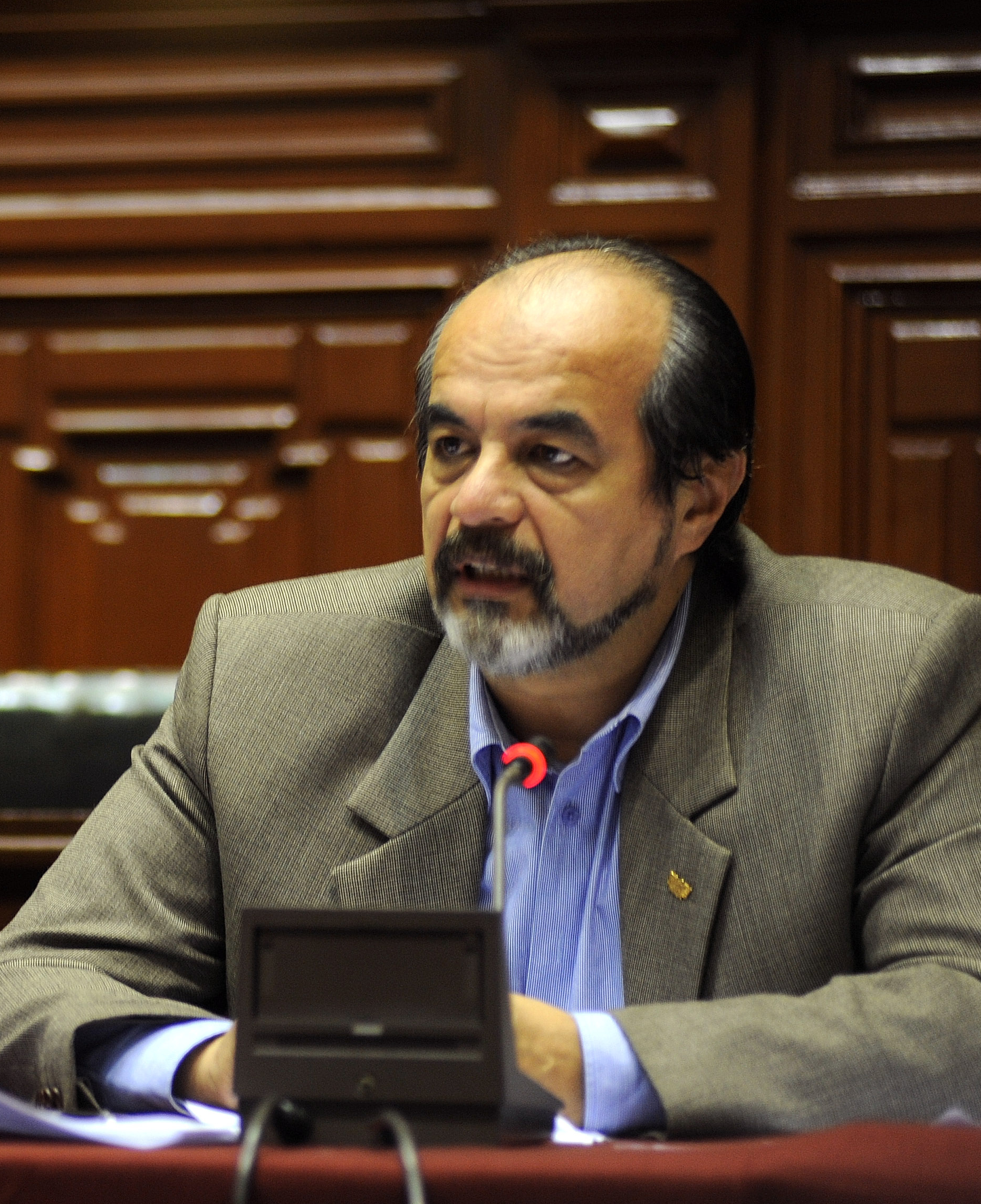

Chairman of the National Political Commission of the Peruvian Aprista Party
- In office 9 July 2017 – 18 October 2026
- President: Alan García; César Trelles
- Preceded by: Javier Velásquez
- Succeeded by: José Pimentel Aliaga

Third Vice President of Congress
- In office 26 July 2017 – 26 July 2018
- President: Luis Galarreta
- Preceded by: Luciana León
- Succeeded by: Yeni Vilcatoma

General Secretary of the Peruvian Aprista Party
- In office 7 June 2004 – 5 March 2010 Serving with Jorge del Castillo
- President: Alan García
- Preceded by: Jorge del Castillo
- Succeeded by: Omar Quesada (Institutional)

Member of Congress
- In office 26 July 2001 – 30 September 2019
- Constituency: Lima

Personal details
- Born: Claude Maurice Mulder Bedoya; 8 June 1956 (age 70) Lima, Peru
- Party: Peruvian Aprista Party
- Spouse: Pilar Orbegoso Puelles
- Children: 3
- Education: Pontifical Catholic University of Peru (LLB); Graduate Institute of International Studies
- Occupation: Politician
- Profession: Lawyer

Claude Maurice Mulder Bedoya, known as Mauricio Mulder (born June 8, 1956), is a Peruvian politician, lawyer and former journalist. At the height of his career one of the most prominent and influential members of the Peruvian Aprista Party, he was Congressman from 2001 to 2019, representing Lima. From 2004 to 2010, he held the office of party general secretary.

Born to a Swiss father and a Peruvian mother, Mulder attended the Pontifical Catholic University of Peru in Lima, earning his law degree in 1979. From a very young age, he joined the Peruvian Aprista Party, and from 1976 to 1977, he led the party's command at his college. He pursued his graduate studies at the Graduate Institute of International Studies (HEI) in Geneva, Switzerland.

Under the first presidency of Alan García, Mulder was chairman of the National Broadcasting Company IRTP. From 1992 to 1995, he served in the United Nations as political officer in the El Salvador peace process. Upon his return to Peru, he worked as a journalist for La República and as consultant, from 1995 to 2000. Following his first election to Congress in 2001, he was elected general secretary of the Peruvian Aprista Party in 2004, alongside Jorge del Castillo, serving till 2010.

A highly contentious figure throughout the Peruvian political crisis since 2016, Mulder’s congressional tenure in office ended in September 2019 as part of Martín Vizcarra’s dissolution of Congress. Having retired from politics after failing to retain his seat in the 2020 snap parliamentary elections, longtime party rival Jorge del Castillo announced Mulder as his running mate at the upcoming 2025 Peruvian Aprista Party presidential primary for the 2026 general election. Del Castillo and Mulder were ultimately defeated by Enrique Valderrama's ticket in the party's presidential primary in November 2025.

== Early life and education ==
Claude Maurice Mulder Bedoya was born on June 8, 1956, in Lima. His parents were Rosa María Bedoya Rivera and Charles Mulder Eymann, the latter of Swiss descent. His paternal uncle, Frederic Mulder, was a renowned pharmaceutic who founded Química Suiza and Quicorp.

Mulder completed his primary and secondary education at the Pestalozzi School, the Swiss Peruvian school of Peru. He was subsequently admitted to the Pontifical Catholic University of Peru, where he graduated with a law degree in 1979. During his law studies, Mulder joined the Peruvian Aprista Party at the age of 17. At his college Aprista Student Command, he was elected president of the Federated Center of Law Students in 1977. As a prominent Aprista student leader, he was very close to Víctor Raúl Haya de la Torre.

Following the culmination of his law degree, Mulder moved to Switzerland to start his graduate education at the Graduate Institute of International Studies, in Geneva. He did not finish the master's degree in international relations.

== Career ==
At the start of the 1980s, Mulder began working as journalist for the Hoy newspaper, and hosted radio and television programs. Four years into the decade, he was appointed to the Futura Publishing Company as deputy director. In this position, he took a prominent role in cultural promotion.

== Political career ==
=== Early political career ===
In 1983, he was appointed to the National Executive Committee of the Peruvian Aprista Party, in the position of Secretary of International Affairs, during the leadership of Secretary General Alan García. Mulder was subsequently appointed secretary of professional caucuses of the party, serving until mid-1990.

In 1988, during the first presidency of Alan García, Mulder was appointed to the chairman of the National Broadcasting Company IRTP. Subsequently, from 1992 and 1995, he was appointed Political Affairs Officer in the Observer Mission of the United Nations in El Salvador.

Following the 1995 general election, Mulder returned to Peru and joined the National Democratic Forum. Alongside Javier Diez Canseco, Lourdes Flores and Alberto Borea, Mulder presented more than 1,500,000 signatures against the re-reelection of Alberto Fujimori and the so-called “authentic interpretation” of the Constitution. Taking a more prominent role in national politics, Mulder was slated to run for the Peruvian Congress at the 2000 general election. Although he was not elected, he was noted for his strong leadership and oratory, and was once again selected to run for Congress at the early 2001 general election for the Lima constituency.

=== Congressional career (2001-2019) ===
In the 2001 elections, he was elected to Congress with more than 24,000 votes and Mulder started his first term in Congress on July 26, 2001, alongside other 27 Aprista representatives. In his tenure, he overtook a strong role in the Supervision and Comptrollership Committee, serving as a fierce leader of the opposition caucus against Alejandro Toledo's administration. Likewise, Mulder was elected Institutional Secretary General of the Peruvian Aprista Party at the 2004 party national convention. At the same time, he served as chairman of the investigative committee on Alberto Fujimori's presidency. The final report was submitted to the Truth and Reconciliation Commission, alleging human rights violations, illicit enrichment, electoral fraud, among other charges.

Alongside Jorge Del Castillo, Mulder served as one of Alan García's main congressional leaders for the upcoming 2006 general election. García ultimately won the presidency, and appointed Del Castillo as Prime Minister of Peru, while Mulder assumed both offices of secretary general, and was reelected to Congress simultaneously. In this position, Mulder was elected Vice President of COPPPAL.

Mulder stepped down as Secretary General in March 2010, being succeeded by Omar Quesada. Running for reelection at the 2011 general election, he attained more than 52,000 votes, securing his seat along 3 other representatives of the party. During Ollanta Humala's administration, he was viewed as one of the most confrontational figures of the opposition. He constantly clashed with various government ministers during congressional inquiries, developing a reputation of a congressional fist-fighter. One of the main government caucus representatives, Daniel Abugattás, verbally insulted Mulder during their debates, while Mulder claimed he was mentally insane. As a staunch defender of Alan García, he represented his party in the investigative committee of the second presidency of Alan García, which final report submitted to the judiciary was dismissed and archived.

At the 2016 general election, Mulder was selected to run for a fourth term. Under the Popular Alliance coalition list for the Lima constituency, he was reelected with over 155,000 votes, attaining one of the highest majorities nationally. For the 2017-2018 annual term, he was elected Third Vice President of Congress term led by Luis Galarreta of the Fujimorist Popular Force.

==== Mulder Bill ====
During his fourth term in Congress, Mulder presented a controversial bill, which prohibited government advertising in private media, except in the event of a national emergency or disaster and electoral educational advertising, stipulating that it could only be done in government media and on the digital network. The legislative initiative was initially presented on November 15, 2017, through Bill No. 2133. According to Mulder, the bill aimed at the "waste of resources" after seeing an advertisement with the slogan "SUNEDU is like that brave aunt who defends us" and that "there are means that live off what the mayor or the governor transfers to them".

On February 28, 2018, the bill was approved by the Permanent Assembly of Congress with 20 votes in favor, 3 against and 14 abstentions. Congress proceeded in passing the bill on June 15, 2018, with 70 votes in favor, 30 against and 7 abstentions. The bill was published on June 18, 2018, in the Legal Norms of the Official Gazette El Peruano, automatically entering in force. The bill received praise by Keiko Fujimori, leader of Popular Force, commenting on the purpose of legislating on state budgets over how the government should or should not invest in state advertising.

On June 21, 2018, the minister of justice, Salvador Heresi, filed before the Constitutional Court the unconstitutionality claim against the bill, stating that the law contravened the Peruvian Constitution and the American Convention on Human Rights. Likewise, on June 20, 2018, the Peruvians for Change caucus filed an opposition lawsuit signed by 33 members of Congress from Popular Action, Broad Front and Alliance for Progress. The claim was subsequently admitted by the Constitutional Court.

The Constitutional Court ultimately declared the Mulder Bill unconstitutional with six votes in favor and only one against.

=== Congressional dissolution and party defeat (2019–2020) ===
On September 30, 2019, president Martín Vizcarra proceeded to constitutionally dissolve Congress following the factual denial of confidence of his cabinet led by Salvador del Solar. Mulder was among the members of Congress that proclaimed Mercedes Aráoz as acting president, condemning Vizcarra's act as a "coup d'état", a "felony", and "the start of a Chavista dictatorship". His remarks were widely dismissed by pundits, viewing the end of his political career due to the perception as one of the most unpopular politicians of the term.

In an attempt to regain his seat, Mulder ran for Congress in the 2020 parliamentary election. He was harshly criticized within his party, specially by his former colleague Jorge del Castillo, who expressed his disconformity with the primaries to which Mulder was to be subjected to. The party's institutional secretary general, Elías Rodríguez claimed that Mulder was an invited candidate rather than an elected one in the primaries, as he was assigned the number 1 in the list for the Lima constituency. The controversy rose when it was revealed that Mulder's name was in the ballot for the primary election, spreading rumors that he obtained a low share of votes, and concluding that he would be in the list by invitation rather than a formal nomination conducted democratically. Mulder himself denied the allegations, claiming that Del Castillo opposed his candidacy for past differences while serving in Congress, declaring his relationship to be of rivals.

The exit polls gave the Peruvian Aprista Party 2.7% of the popular vote, thus failing to pass the electoral threshold, and preventing Mulder from returning to Congress. Following the poor results, Mulder claimed full responsibility for his party's defeat, and opened his own law firm, retiring from Peruvian politics, though he remains as the chairman of the political commission of his own party.

== Electoral history ==
Election	Office	List	#	District	Votes			Result	Ref.
Election	Office	List	#	District	Total	%	P.	Result	Ref.
2000	Member of Congress	Peruvian Aprista Party	20	National	6,191	5.51%	5th (Note: Presented on an electoral list. The data shown represents the share of the vote the entire party/alliance received in that constituency.)	Not elected	
2001	Member of Congress	Peruvian Aprista Party	8	Lima	24,571	17.14%	2nd	Elected	
2006	Member of Congress	Peruvian Aprista Party	3	Lima	38,670	17.41%	1st	Elected	
2011	Member of Congress	Peruvian Aprista Party	1	Lima Metropolitan Area	52,798	6.20%	5th	Elected	
2016	Member of Congress	Popular Alliance	1	Lima Metropolitan Area	122,778	8.81%	4th	Elected	
2020	Member of Congress	Peruvian Aprista Party	1	Lima Metropolitan Area	64,986	2.59%	13th	Not elected	

Party political offices
Preceded by Office established	Institutional Secretary General of the Peruvian Aprista Party; 2004-2010	Succeeded by Omar Quesada
