= Juventud Aprista Peruana =

Peruvian Aprista Youth Juventud Aprista Peruana
- National Secretary: Santiago Félix Morán
- Founded: January 7, 1934; 92 years ago (as Aprista Youth Federation)
- Ideology: Aprismo; Social democracy Latin American integration
- Mother party: (Peru) Peruvian Aprista Party
- International affiliation: International Union of Socialist Youth (IUSY)

The Peruvian Aprista Youth (Spanish: Juventud Aprista Peruana, JAP) is the youth wing of Peruvian Aprista Party (APRA) in Peru for members aged 25 and under. The organization shares the same values and policies as its parent political party with branches being an integrated part of local associations. College and university branches are not included, but run independently.

== History ==
After the Trujillo Revolution of 1932, the Vanguardia Aprista Juvenil (VAJ) existed underground. On January 7, 1934, the Federación Aprista Juvenil (FAJ) was founded as the official youth wing of the party, which sacrificed the lives of its best cadres during the years of persecution and martyrdom. Its first General Secretary was Armando Villanueva. Years later, it took the name Juventud Aprista Peruana (JAP) and subsequently created functional student bodies, coordinated by the National Youth Secretariat.

The Peruvian Aprista Youth (JAP) brings together members aged 15 to 25 (at age 18, they automatically belong to the party). Like the adult organization, it also has territorial jurisdiction. In all committees across Peru, the JAP functions as a comprehensive training school for new citizens.

The functional bodies of the APRA Youth are the Aprista University Commands (CUA), the Aprista Higher Education Commands (CAIS), and the Aprista School Commands (CEA).

The CHAP (Peruvian Aprista Children) are children's clubs for boys and girls aged 7 to 14, providing comprehensive civic education. Notable examples include the “23 de Mayo” Children's Club at the PAP headquarters, the “Los Cachorros” Club of the Surquillo District Committee in Lima, and the Fanfare of the Lambayeque Departmental Committee. Their bands perform at all party events.

== Current structure and composition ==
=== National Command ===
The National Command of the Juventud Aprista Peruana is the executive leadership of the party’s youth wing at national level. It is the responsibility of the National Command to give the unit of total action committees and party cadres, efficiently support the development of decentralized activities and delegate decision-making authority to the Base Committees throughout the country, with knowledge of the national political leadership, and in coordination with the National Youth Secretariat.

==== Current leadership ====
- General Secretary: Santiago César Félix Morán, Lima
- Secretary of Organization: Adriana Nicol Moncada Velásquez, La Libertad
- Secretary of Economy: Billy Emanuel Fernández Chávez, Lima
- Secretary of Women: Gianella Yesamine Rodas Ramos, Cusco
- Secretary of Discipline: Deyki Jheimy Alarcón Zapata, Lambayeque
- Secretary of Vote Defense: Gypsy Alexandra Grijalva Maquén, San Martín
- Secretary of Press and Propaganda: Víctor Raúl Ortiz Oviedo, Piura
- Secretary of Political Training and Doctrine: Almendra Giraldine Rivera Flores, Tacna
- Secretary of International Relations: Luis Alberto Molero Gordon, Lima

== See also ==
- American Popular Revolutionary Alliance
