= Casa del Pueblo, Lima =

APRA Party headquarters in Lima

Casa del Pueblo
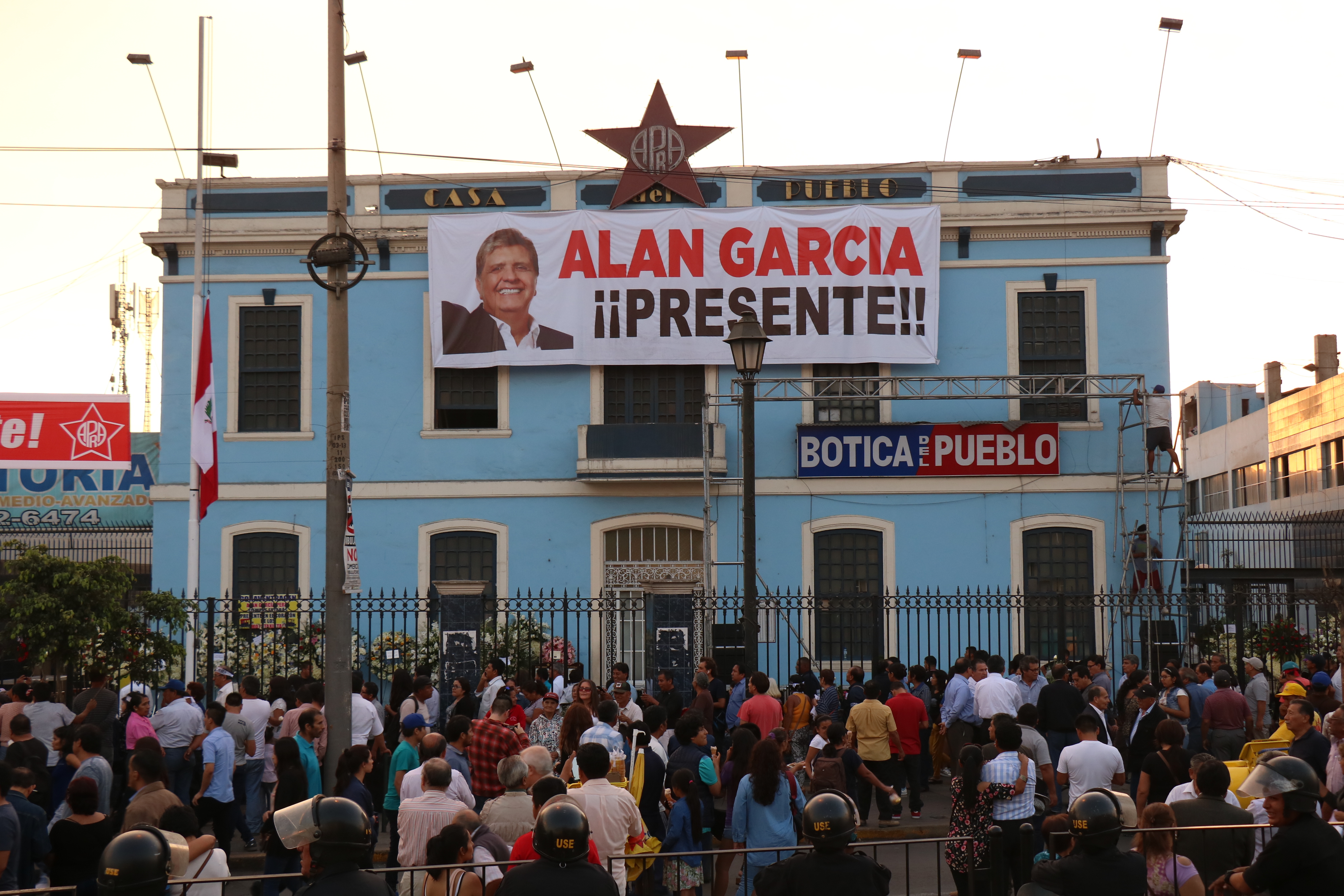
- The building during the wake of Alan García
- Interactive map of the Casa del Pueblo area

General information
- Architectural style: Republican
- Location: Av. Alfonso Ugarte 1012
- Year built: Early 20th century
- Inaugurated: 1948 (APRA)
- Owner: APRA Party

Technical details
- Floor count: 2

Website
- apraperu.com

The Casa del Pueblo (Spanish: House of the People) is a building that serves as the main headquarters of the American Popular Revolutionary Alliance, a political party in Peru. In addition to its political functions, it also provides social services, including education, healthcare and soup kitchen.

== History ==
The Party was originally headquartered at 1065 Belén Street, near the Plaza San Martín. Since 1948, the Central Command of the Peruvian Aprista Party has been in the city of Lima and is located in an old house which originally housed the Hipólito Unanue School, in Alfonso Ugarte Avenue. It was acquired after an intense partisan collection under the influence of Víctor Raúl Haya de la Torre himself. This property is a historical symbol of the Aprista Party and its facilities are also part of the places used by union members to report on their work.

The building was targeted by a number of administrations, such as in 1992, during the government of Alberto Fujimori, who ordered a military intervention.

From April 17 to 19, 2019, the funeral of former APRA president Alan García was held in the building.

== Overview ==
The two-storey building is located in Lima District, on an avenue nicknamed the "Avenue of the White Handkerchiefs", as a popular recognition of the presence of the APRA in the Peruvian capital, in allusion to the APRA ritual of greeting its leaders with white handkerchiefs, a symbol of their loyalty and brotherhood.

The building has several rooms and a large "Aula Magna", where it says: "Only God will save my soul and only Aprism will save Peru." In the main building, on the first floor is the Headquarters, where Víctor Raúl Haya de la Torre listened to the people, and the National Policy Directorate. On the second floor are the offices of the Party Presidency, the General Secretariat, the General Management and the Moral Ethics Court.

Near the patio are the classrooms of the National School of Oratory (Spanish: Escuela Nacional de Oratoria) and also the Antenor Orrego Pre-University Academy (Spanish: Academia Preuniversitaria Antenor Orrego), named in honor of the APRA philosopher.

== See also ==
- American Popular Revolutionary Alliance
