= Peruvian Union University =

Private University in Peru

Coordinates: 11.9899°S 76.8413°W

- Universidad Peruana Unión
- Motto: Educat huic vitae et aeternitate
- Motto in English: Educating for life and eternity
- Type: Private
- Established: 1919
- Affiliations: Seventh-day Adventist Church
- Rector: Gluder Quispe Huanca
- Students: 11,500 (2018)
- Location: Altura Km. 19 Carretera Central, Ñaña, Lurigancho-Chosica, Lima, Peru
- Campus: Rural, 600 acres (2.4 km^{2})
- Website: upeu.edu.pe

Peruvian Union University (Spanish: Universidad Peruana Unión) is a Seventh-day Adventist university in Lima, Peru. It is the second largest of ten Adventist universities in South America. Its acronym is "UPeU". It is a part of the Seventh-day Adventist education system, the world's second largest Christian school system. Founded in 1919 as part of the Industrial College (today the Miraflores Adventist College) in Miraflores, Lima, it was the first higher education facility started by Seventh-day Adventists in Peru.

It is part of the Seventh-day Adventist education system, the world's second largest Christian school system. Academic activities take place on a campus covering 242 hectares. The acceptance rate range is 60-69% making this Peruvian higher education organization a moderately selective institution. The facilities include laboratories, classrooms, multimedia services and conference rooms that are used both for classes and in the summer courses. The University has a large library that includes Internet access. The University has sports facilities, online courses and distance learning opportunities, as well as administrative services and runs an exchange program with partners in several national and foreign universities.

== History ==
The UPeU arises as a product of the educational work of the Seventh-day Adventist Church in the world and in Peru. Its origins date back to 1919 when, with Harry B. Lundquist, JM Howell and Fernando Osorio, the Industrial Institute was organized in the Miraflores district of the city of Lima. On June 12, 1944, it changed its name to Colegio Unión, with which it achieved prestige at a national and international level, both within the church environment and outside of it. On April 30, 1969, it became the Union Higher Education Center (CESU), making official the higher-level studies that it had been offering in its classrooms since 1947.

On November 17, 1946, the Ministry of Education authorized the transfer of Colegio Unión to the town of Ñaña, where it currently remains. In 1947 the Theology program began, in 1953 the Secretarial and Accounting program (Commercial Accountants). In 1976, the Board of Regents of the General Conference of Seventh-day Adventists recognized the higher education offered by accrediting the higher education provided at the institution. In 1979, the Nutrition and Nursing programs began.

Due to the academic changes made in the institution, the name “College” was incompatible with higher education. On April 30, 1969, its name was changed to the Unión Higher Education Center (CESU), a name it retained until the law creating the Unión Incaica University (UUI) was passed. On December 30, 1983, the institution was recognized by the Peruvian government as the Universidad Unión Incaica (UUI) upon promulgation of Law No. 23758, recognizing it as a legal entity of private law, promoted and organized by the Unión Incaica Association of the Seventh-day Adventist Church. Then, as of November 3, 1995, by law No. 26542, it changed its name to UNIVERSIDAD PERUANA UNIÓN.

== See also ==
- List of Seventh-day Adventist colleges and universities
- Seventh-day Adventist education
