= Jorge Nieto =

Peruvian politician

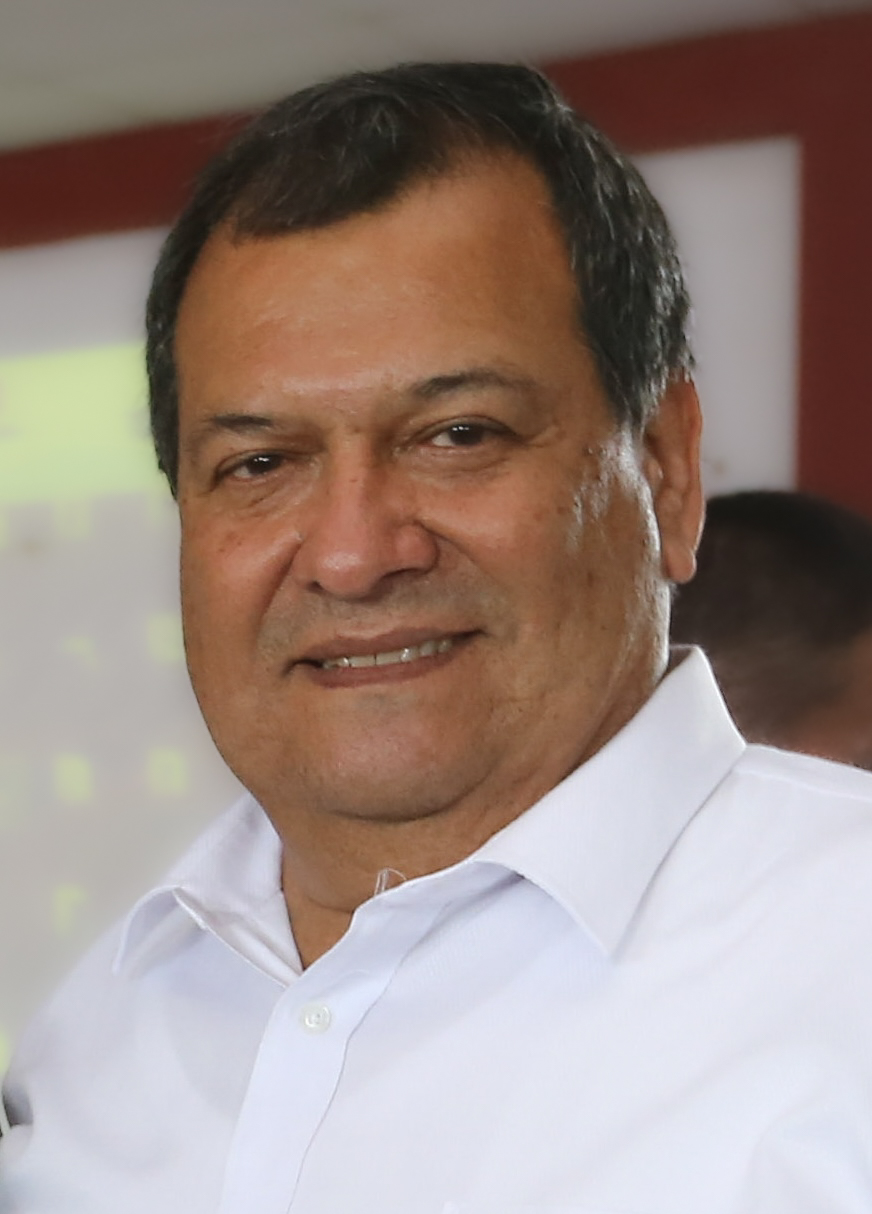
- Nieto in 2017

President of the Party of Good Government
- Incumbent
- Assumed office 28 August 2023
- Preceded by: Party established

Minister of Defence
- In office 5 December 2016 – 3 January 2018
- Prime Minister: Fernando Zavala; Mercedes Aráoz
- Preceded by: Mariano González Fernández
- Succeeded by: Jorge Kisic Wagner

Minister of Culture
- In office 28 July 2016 – 5 December 2016
- Prime Minister: Fernando Zavala
- Preceded by: Diana Álvarez-Calderón
- Succeeded by: Salvador del Solar

Personal details
- Born: Jorge Nieto Montesinos; 29 October 1951 (age 74) Arequipa, Peru
- Party: Party of Good Government (since 2023); Independent (until 2023)
- Relatives: Vladimiro Montesinos (uncle)
- Occupation: Sociologist, politician
- Nickname: Tio Coco

Jorge Nieto Montesinos (born 29 October 1951) is a Peruvian sociologist and politician.

He served as Minister of Culture from July to December 2016 and as Minister of Defense during the government of Pedro Pablo Kuczynski from December 2016 to January 2018, when he resigned following the pardon granted to convicted former president Alberto Fujimori.

He has also been involved in public policy research and state modernisation efforts in Peru, and was a candidate in the 2026 Peruvian general election.

== Early life ==
Jorge Nieto Montesinos was born on October 29, 1951, in Arequipa. He is the son of Walter Nieto Miranda and Carmen Montesinos Hartley, and the nephew of Alfonso Montesinos y Montesinos, Adela Montesinos y Montesinos, and Vladimiro Montesinos, a former presidential advisor to Alberto Fujimori.

Due to his father's military service, he completed his primary and secondary education in various public schools across the country, finishing at the Colegio Nacional de la Independencia Americana in Arequipa.

He studied Law and Sociology at the Pontifical Catholic University of Peru (1974–1978), earning a bachelor's degree. He later obtained a master's degree in Political Science from FLACSO (1982–1984) and pursued doctoral studies in Social Sciences at El Colegio de México (1988–1991).

== Political career ==
Nieto Montesinos was a cabinet member of president Pedro Pablo Kuczynski since his inauguration in July 2016 until January 2018. He served as Minister of Culture and, later, as Minister of Defense. He resigned as a consequence of Kuczysnki's presidential pardon of former dictator Alberto Fujimori.

Nieto was the presidential candidate for the Good Government Party in Peru’s 2026 general election. Nieto Montesinos finished fourth in the first round with 10.978% of the valid votes. In the runoff between Roberto Sánchez and Keiko Fujimori, he did not endorse either candidate and actively promoted spoiling ballots, urging his supporters to write “We Want Good Government” on their ballots. Nieto also questioned the “lesser evil” argument for choosing between the two candidates as problematic, and argued that “the (Peruvian) left must take responsibility for the consequences of constantly choosing the lesser evil.”

During an interview with journalist and influencer Víctor Caballero, Nieto took a critical stance toward Sánchez and Juntos por el Perú, accusing the party of having members allegedly linked to MOVADEF—an organization founded by supporters and former members of the now-defunct terrorist group Shining Path— adding that Sánchez had been “lying” on that matter.
