= Mónica Yaya =

Peruvian lawyer and politician (born 1969)

President of the Peruvian Aprista Party
- Incumbent
- Assumed office 18 October 2026
- Preceded by: César Trelles

President of the State Procurement Tribunal
- In office 2010–2011

Member of the State Procurement Tribunal
- In office 2007–2011

Personal details
- Born: Mónica Yadira Yaya Luyo; 21 January 1969 (age 57) San Vicente de Cañete, Peru
- Party: Peruvian Aprista Party
- Spouse: Eduardo Olivos
- Education: University of Lima; Pontifical Catholic University of Peru
- Occupation: Lawyer, politician

Mónica Yadira Yaya Luyo (born 21 January 1969) is a Peruvian lawyer and politician who specialises in administrative law and public procurement. During the second government of Alan García she was a member and later president of the State Procurement Tribunal of the Supervisory Agency for State Procurement (OSCE). A member of the Peruvian Aprista Party (APRA), she was one of its candidates for the Senate in the 2026 general election and its candidate for Mayor of Lima in the 2026 municipal election. Two weeks after that election, the party's XXVI National Congress elected her president of the Peruvian Aprista Party.

== Early life and education ==
Yaya was born on 21 January 1969 in San Vicente de Cañete. According to the sworn CV she filed with the National Jury of Elections, she received her bachelor's degree in law in 1994 and qualified as a lawyer in 1996, and has postgraduate studies in constitutional law. Her public profiles mention studies at the University of Lima, the Pontifical Catholic University of Peru and the University of Bologna. She has also said she trained professionally in Peru and in Europe.

== Professional career ==
=== State Procurement Tribunal ===
Yaya's career has centred on public procurement. From 2007 to 2011 she was a member (vocal) of the State Procurement Tribunal (Tribunal de Contrataciones del Estado), the OSCE body that resolves disputes and imposes sanctions in public purchasing. During that period she became the tribunal's president, the post for which Peruvian media usually identify her. According to Diario Correo, she was removed from her post as a member of the tribunal.

=== Private practice ===
In the private sector she has been general manager of the construction company Yaya Luyo Constructores S.A. and head of the consultancy Asuntos Públicos E.I.R.L., and has worked as a lawyer advising on public tenders.

== Public commentary and complaints ==
Yaya became a frequent commentator on corruption and public procurement in the Peruvian media. In January 2014 she criticised the tribunal's sanctions regime, arguing that honest suppliers were being disqualified without consequence for those responsible. In 2015 she accused the OSCE's executive president, Magali Rojas, and a former board member of irregularities, including a contract awarded to a single bidder, and claimed both had been appointed through their friendship with Nadine Heredia. In August 2020 she said that a minister bore administrative and possibly criminal responsibility over a state contract signed with a company in which the minister's father was a shareholder.

In November 2021 she told the congressional Oversight Committee that a company represented by the brother and nephew of Justice Minister Aníbal Torres had signed a 14-million-sol contract with the state after Torres took office, which she argued the procurement law prohibited.

In February 2022 she filed a constitutional complaint in Congress against Dina Boluarte, then vice president and Minister of Development and Social Inclusion, for omitting from her declaration of interests her relationship with her brother-in-law, who had signed a teaching contract with the Comptroller General's Office. The Comptroller's Office opened a review of both declarations. Congress's Subcommittee on Constitutional Accusations shelved the complaint on 4 June 2024, finding no evidence of wrongdoing.

== Political career ==
=== 2026 Senate candidacy ===
Yaya joined APRA in 2022 and, in 2025, became one of its candidates for the 2026 general election, in which the party presented itself as a "democratic left" with a renewed leadership. She ran third on the party's national Senate list, campaigning on anti-corruption and the review of state concession contracts, and was part of presidential candidate Enrique Valderrama's technical team on justice reform. In February 2026 she debated Fuerza Popular's Milagros Salazar on El Comercio's "Versus" programme, calling on President José Jerí to resign, and blamed César Acuña and his party for the crisis in the public health system.

In the election of 12 April 2026, APRA failed to pass the 5% threshold and won no seats. Yaya received 13,479 preferential votes, the fourth-highest on the party's national Senate list after Carla García, Jorge del Castillo and José Luis Delgado Núñez del Arco.

After Keiko Fujimori won the presidency, Yaya argued in July 2026 that APRA should act as a "democratic opposition" and that any party member joining the new government should take leave or resign from the party. She denied reports that she was being considered for a government post.

=== 2026 Lima mayoral campaign ===
Yaya was APRA's candidate for mayor of Lima in the municipal elections of 4 October 2026. Her list was one of five late candidacies admitted, in part, by the Lima Centro Special Electoral Jury in August 2026, raising the number of lists in the race to 27. According to El Comercio, her candidacy surprised parts of the party leadership; she said the JNE decision that allowed her registration was lawful. She launched her campaign in Miraflores.

Her campaign focused on fighting corruption and auditing the city's finances under former mayor Rafael López Aliaga. She called his candidacy as first councillor for Popular Renewal a "disguised re-election" and unconstitutional, and questioned his attendance at the city's public-safety council. Her proposals included seeking at least thirty more carriages for the Lima Metro to exceed a million daily journeys, bringing the Lima–Chosica train into service, asking the national government to acquire the Pegasus system to intercept criminals' communications, increasing funding for community kitchens (ollas comunes), and creating one-stop centres for victims of violence in every district. She took part in the JNE's mayoral debate on 22 September 2026.

She finished 15th, with 0.50% of the vote.

=== President of the Peruvian Aprista Party ===
On 18 October 2026, two weeks after the municipal election, Yaya was elected president of the Peruvian Aprista Party by the XXVI Party National Congress, held in Trujillo from 16 to 18 October. Days before it opened, a civil court in Trujillo had temporarily suspended the congress at the request of the party's provincial secretary general in Otuzco.

Her election is perceived as continuation of the renewal of leadership that APRA had undertaken since 2025, when it began presenting itself as a "democratic left" under the presidential candidacy of Enrique Valderrama. She takes over a party that lost its registration after failing to pass the electoral threshold in the April 2026 general election, and must lead it through re-registration, which requires collecting new signatures, before it can contest future elections. In her first interview as party president, she said APRA must be "the conscience of the nation", and pledged transparency in the party's income and use of its resources.

== Political positions ==
Yaya describes herself as an aprista of the democratic left. Her political message centres on fighting corruption and rejects extremism of both the right and the left.

== Personal life ==
Yaya lives in Lima married to Eduardo Olivos and has two teenage children.

== Electoral history ==
=== Legislative ===
Election	Office	List	#	District	Votes			Result	Ref.
Election	Office	List	#	District	Total	%	P.	Result	Ref.
2026	Senator of the Republic	Peruvian Aprista Party	3	National	13,479	1.71%	12th (Note: Presented on an electoral list. The data shown represents the share of the vote the entire party/alliance received in that constituency.)	Not elected	

=== Municipal ===
Election	Office	List	Votes			Result	Ref.
Election	Office	List	Total	%	P.	Result	Ref.
2026	Mayor of Lima	Peruvian Aprista Party	27,091	0.50%	15th	Not elected	
