= Jorge del Castillo =

Peruvian lawyer and politician

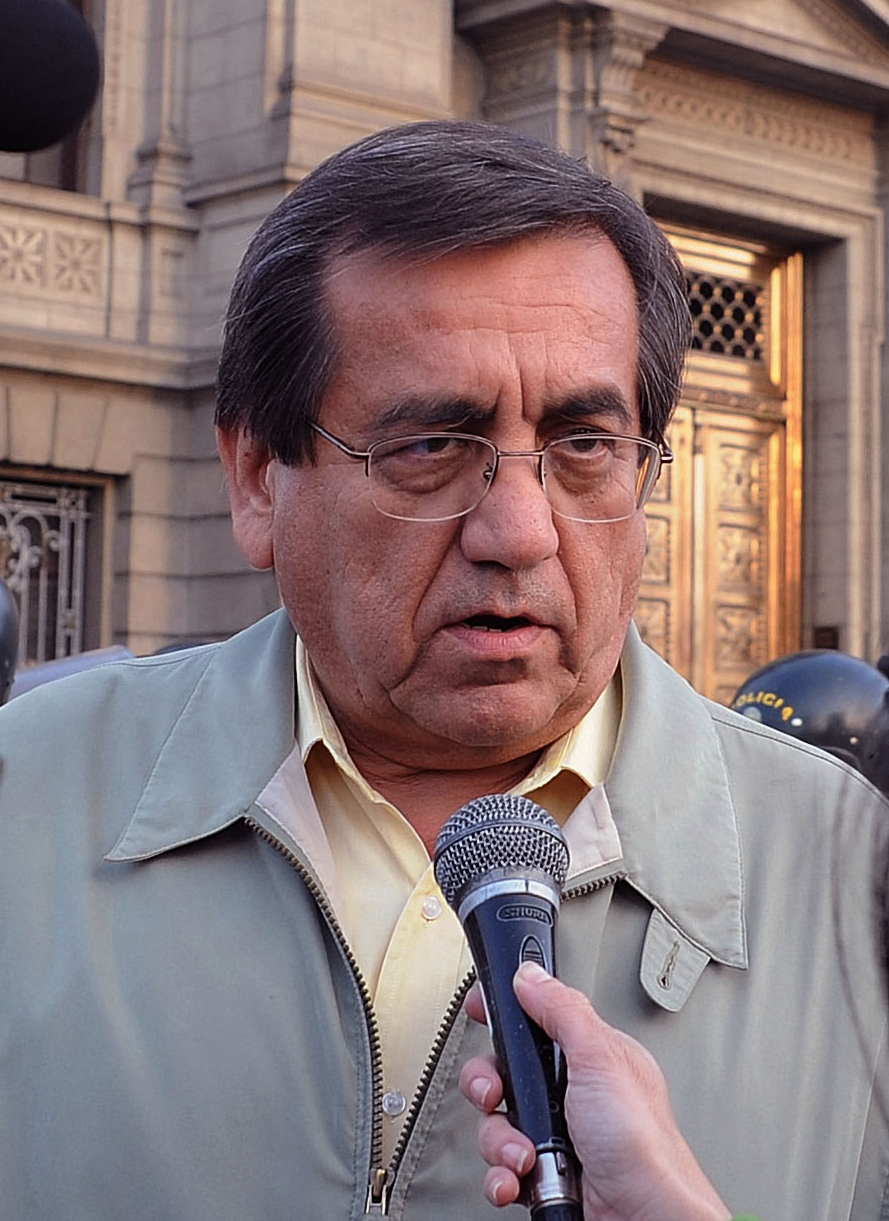

Prime Minister of Peru
- In office 28 July 2006 – 14 October 2008
- President: Alan García
- Preceded by: Pedro Pablo Kuczynski
- Succeeded by: Yehude Simon

Member of Congress
- In office 26 July 2016 – 30 September 2019
- Constituency: Lima
- In office 26 July 2001 – 25 July 2011
- Constituency: Lima
- In office 26 July 1995 – 26 July 2001
- Constituency: National

Second Vice President of Congress
- In office 26 July 2001 – 26 July 2002
- President: Carlos Ferrero
- Preceded by: Henry Pease
- Succeeded by: Mercedes Cabanillas

Member of the Chamber of Deputies
- In office 26 July 1990 – 5 April 1992
- Constituency: Lima

Mayor of Lima
- In office 1 January 1987 – 31 December 1989
- Preceded by: Alfonso Barrantes
- Succeeded by: Ricardo Belmont

Prefect of the Department of Lima
- In office 8 August 1985 – 12 July 1986

Mayor of Barranco
- In office 1 January 1984 – 31 December 1986
- Preceded by: Nicomedes Montalván Prado
- Succeeded by: Pedro Allemant Centeno

Member of the Barranco District Council
- In office 1 January 1981 – 31 December 1983
Party offices
Political General Secretary of the Peruvian Aprista Party
In office 7 June 2004 – 8 July 2017
President	Alan García
Preceded by	Office established (himself as only General Secretary)
Succeeded by	Benigno Chirinos
General Secretary of the Peruvian Aprista Party
In office 1 December 1999 – 7 June 2004
Preceded by	Luis Alva Castro
Succeeded by	Office divided (himself with Mauricio Mulder)
Chairman of the Peruvian Aprista Party National Political Commission
In office 31 January 1995 – 1 December 1999
National Secretary of Local Governments of the Peruvian Aprista Party
In office 20 February 1986 – 20 February 1989

Personal details
- Born: Jorge Alfonso Alejandro del Castillo Gálvez; 2 July 1950 (age 76) Lima, Peru
- Party: Peruvian Aprista Party
- Spouse: Carmen Haas Pelosi
- Children: 4
- Education: National University of San Marcos (LLB); Pontifical Catholic University of Peru (no degree)
- Occupation: Politician
- Profession: Lawyer

Jorge Alfonso Alejandro del Castillo Gálvez (born 2 July 1950) is a Peruvian lawyer and politician. In his career, he has served in the now abolished Peruvian Chamber of Deputies between 1990 and 1992, in the unicameral Congress of the Republic for six non-consecutive terms, between 1995 and 2011 and again from 2016 to 2019, five of which are consecutive terms, and as Mayor of Lima and the District of Barranco during the 1980s.

An adept negotiator, he is also a prominent member of the Peruvian Aprista Party, serving in two occasions as the party's Secretary-General. As the right-hand man to the late former President Alan García, he served as his defense attorney during the first corruption and illicit enrichment allegations made in his first post-presidency, and finally as his first Prime Minister in his second presidency.

== Early life and education ==
Born in 1950 in the Barranco District in Lima, Jorge del Castillo pursued his elementary, middle and high school education at the Colegio San Luis of Barranco. Upon graduation, he enrolled in National University of San Marcos, studying law from 1968 to 1974. He enrolled in the graduate program in constitutional law offered by Pontifical Catholic University of Peru in 1993, but did not complete the degree. In addition, he holds a certificate in Senior Management from the University of Piura.

He became a member of the Peruvian Aprista Party while he was a law student at the National University of San Marcos.

== Political career ==
=== 1980s ===
A prominent member of the Peruvian Aprista Party, Del Castillo was first elected to public office as a Councilman of the District of Barranco in 1981. In the 1983 municipal elections, he was elected Mayor of the same district. He held the position until 1985, when President Alan García appointed him Prefect (appointed department governor) of Lima.

He rose to political prominence after being elected Mayor of Lima in late-1986, defeating various popular candidates such as former christian democrat Mayor from the 1960s, Luis Bedoya Reyes and incumbent Marxist Mayor Alfonso Barrantes. As Mayor, he did very little in the case of infrastructure and rehabilitation of roads, although he claimed that he couldn't do much because of the rise of terrorism.

=== 1990s ===
In 1990, he was elected to the Chamber of Deputies, serving until 1992, when President Alberto Fujimori dissolved Congress in a self-coup. During his short term in Congress, he defended APRA leader Alan García from the accusations against him involving corruption and unjust enrichment.

Del Castillo returned to politics in 1995, when he was elected to Congress representing Lima. He was reelected for office in 2000, 2001, and 2006. In 2004, he was ratified as Secretary General of the Party for a second term (this time as Institutional Secretary General of the Party), serving until 2006, when he resigned after being named by newly elected President Alan García as his inaugural Prime Minister.

After his ousting as a Deputy, he helped García escape from Peru and find refuge in Colombia. With García in exile, Del Castillo became one of the most respected leaders of the Party, and was elected Secretary General in 1999.

=== 2000s ===
For the 2000 general election, APRA selected Del Castillo as Abel Salinas first running mate; however, the ticket was not successful and attained a little over 1% as it placed sixth.

During his work in the legislature, he showed his opposition to the Fujimori regime and participated in the "March of the Four Suyos" on July 28, 2000, the same day that Alberto Fujimori assumed his third government.

In November of the same year, after the fall of the Fujimori government, his legislative position was reduced until 2001 when new general elections were called.

In the 2001 general elections, he was reelected Congressman by APRA for the 2001-2006 parliamentary term.

During his work, he was 2nd Vice President of the Congress of the Republic during the period 2001-2002; President of the Subcommission for Constitutional Reform of the Economic Regime (2001-2002), President of the Working Group on the Law of Political Parties (2002-2003) and President of the Special Commission for Investment of the Congress of the Republic in the 2004- legislatures 2005 and 2005-2006.

In 2004, he was ratified as Secretary General of the Party for a second term (this time as Institutional Secretary General of the Party), serving until 2006, when he resigned after being named by newly elected President Alan García as his inaugural Prime Minister. He served as Political Secretary General between 2010 and 2017, concurrently with the Institutional Secretary General, former Ayacucho Governor Omar Quesada.

Del Castillo was sworn in as García's Prime Minister on July 28, 2006, swearing for Víctor Raúl Haya de la Torre and "APRA martyrs blood". During his premiership, he gave political and economic stability to the country, generating confidence with Congress, making agreements with various unions and successfully managing social conflicts within the country.

After the "Petroaudios" scandal revealed Del Castillo's involvement, he tendered his resignation with the whole cabinet on October 10, 2008, to President Alan García, marking his political downfall.

=== 2010s ===
Del Castillo served in Congress until 2011, after failing to achieve a fifth consecutive reelection. He served as Political Secretary General between 2010 and 2017, concurrently with the Institutional Secretary General, former Ayacucho Governor Omar Quesada.

In the 2016 general election, Del Castillo was reelected for a fifth term in Congress, returning after 5 years of absence under the Popular Alliance. By law, he cannot run again for reelection since the approval of the third clause of the 2018 constitutional referendum, which states the prohibition of immediate reelection for congressman.

His final tenure in office ended with the dissolution of Congress by Martín Vizcarra. He served a total of 19 years in Congress.

== Offices summary ==
=== Public offices ===
- Member of the Barranco District Council (1981-1983)
- Mayor of the District of Barranco (1984-1986)
- Prefect of the Department of Lima (1985-1986)
- Metropolitan Mayor of Lima (1987-1989)
- Chairman of Association of Municipalities of Peru (1987-1989)
- Member of the Chamber of Deputies (1990-1992)
- Member of Congress (1995-2000) (2000-2001) (2001-2006) (2006-2011) (2016-2019)
- Second Vice President of Congress (2001-2002)
- President of the Council of Ministers (2006-2008)

=== Party offices ===
- District General Secretary - Barranco (1982)
- National Secretary of Local Governments (1986-1989)
- Chairman of the National Political Commission (1995-1999)
- General Secretary (1999-2004) (2004-2006)
- First vice presidential nominee (2000)
- Second vice presidential nominee (2001)
- Political General Secretary (2010-2017)

== Electoral history ==
=== Executive ===
Election	Office	List	Votes			Result	Ref.
Election	Office	List	Total	%	P.	Result	Ref.
2000	First Vice President of Peru	Peruvian Aprista Party	152,510	1.38%	6th	Not elected	
2001	Second Vice President of Peru	Peruvian Aprista Party	2,732,857	25.77%	2nd	→ Round 2	
2001	Second Vice President of Peru	Peruvian Aprista Party	4,904,929	46.92%	2nd	Not elected	

=== Legislative ===
Election	Office	List	#	District	Votes			Result	Ref.
Election	Office	List	#	District	Total	%	P.	Result	Ref.
1990	Member of the Chamber of Deputies	Peruvian Aprista Party	5	Lima Metropolitan Area	36,104	15.06%	4th (Note: Presented on an electoral list. The data shown represents the share of the vote the entire party/alliance received in that constituency.)	Elected	
1995	Member of Congress	Peruvian Aprista Party	2	National	36,024	6.53%	3rd	Elected	
2000	Member of Congress	Peruvian Aprista Party	1	National	41,834	50.51%	5th	Elected	
2001	Member of Congress	Peruvian Aprista Party	2	Lima	152,491	17.14%	2nd	Elected	
2006	Member of Congress	Peruvian Aprista Party	5	Lima	81,196	17.41%	3rd	Elected	
2011	Member of Congress	Peruvian Aprista Party	36	Lima + Overseas Residents	31,154	6.20%	6th	Not elected	
2016	Member of Congress	Popular Alliance	5	Lima + Overseas Residents	57,933	8.81%	4th	Elected	

=== Municipal ===
Election	Office	List	#	Votes			Result	Ref.
Election	Office	List	#	Total	%	P.	Result	Ref.
1980	Barranco District Councilman	Peruvian Aprista Party	2	4,964	14.80%	4th (Note: Presented on an electoral list. The data shown represents the share of the vote the entire party/alliance received in that constituency.)	Elected	
1983	Mayor of Barranco	Peruvian Aprista Party	1	9,115	27.10%	1st	Elected	
1986	Mayor of Lima	Peruvian Aprista Party	1	817,056	37.56%	1st	Elected	

== See also ==
- 2008 Peru oil scandal

Political offices
Preceded by Pedro Pablo Kuczynski	Prime Minister of Peru; 2006 – 2008	Succeeded by Yehude Simon
