= César Trelles =

Peruvian dental surgeon and politician

President of the Peruvian Aprista Party
- In office 29 October 2019 – 18 October 2026
- Preceded by: Alan García (April 2019)
- Succeeded by: Mónica Yaya

1st Governor of Piura
- In office 1 January 2003 – 31 December 2010
- Preceded by: Office created
- Succeeded by: Javier Atkins Lerggios

Member of the Chamber of Deputies
- In office 26 July 1980 – 5 April 1992
- Constituency: Piura

Personal details
- Born: May 3, 1936 (age 90) Morropón, Peru
- Party: Peruvian Aprista Party
- Education: National University of San Marcos (DDS)
- Occupation: Dental surgeon

César Trelles Lara (born May 3, 1936) is a Peruvian dental surgeon and politician who served as president of the Peruvian Aprista Party from October 2019 to October 2026.

He served as governor of Piura from 2003 to 2010, and as member of the now abolished Peruvian Chamber of Deputies from 1980 to 1992, representing the constituency of Piura.

== Early life and education ==
César Trelles Lara was born on May 3, 1936, in Morropón District, Morropón Province, Piura Region, Peru. He belonged to the ranks of the Peruvian Aprista Party from a very young age. Trelles studied dentistry at the National University of San Marcos, graduating in 1960 as a dental surgeon. Between 1978 and 1982, he taught dentistry at the Universidad Nacional Federico Villarreal, and he simultaneously served as national secretary of popular urbanizations within his party.

== Political career ==
Trelles was elected to the lower house of the Peruvian Congress for Piura in 1980. He was reelected in 1985 and 1990. His last term in office was interrupted by the self-coup led by president Alberto Fujimori on April 5, 1992.

In 2000, he was elected secretary general of the Peruvian Aprista Party in Piura, a position he would later resign to run as a candidate for the first gubernatorial election in Piura.

In November 2002 he was elected governor of Piura, a position he officially took on January 1, 2003. His tenure was not without criticism, much of which arose from within his own party. In November 2004, a former manager in the region denounced to the media that Trelles was filling up positions in the regional government with party members, and that this was leading to great inefficiency in the administration.

In July 2006, party congressman José Carrasco Távara emphasized his criticism of Trelles and accepted an internal resolution by his party's electoral body, declaring a nullification of his candidacy for the 2006 regional elections for having pending with the Peruvian State. Despite this, his re-election prospered amid internal strife, attaining 24.71% of the popular vote, 18,000 votes over his main opponent, Javier Atkins.

Subsequently, he unsuccessfully sought further reelection in the 2010, 2014 and 2018 regional elections.

On April 19, 2019, Trelles and a group of party leaders from Piura were involved in a deadly car accident while traveling to Lima to attend the wake of Alan García at the party headquarters. He was taken by helicopter to a Lima hospital in critical condition. The accident left him incapacitated due to his age.

=== Presidency of the Peruvian Aprista Party (2019–2026) ===
On October 27, 2019, Trelles was elected president of the Peruvian Aprista Party, defeating former congressman Carlos Roca Cáceres. The leadership election was controversial, with accusations of fraud and favoritism towards Trelles' list, which involved former congressman Mauricio Mulder, as chairman of the Political Commission, and current secretaries-general Elías Rodríguez and Benigno Chirinos. His accident was brought to light by the losing side, as they suggested that Trelles was not even aware of him running for the position due to his medical condition. Pundits view his election as an intent by Mulder, Rodríguez and Chirinos to continue manipulating the party's leadership, as the presidency is a more honorific position for the late Alan García. Following the Peruvian Aprista Party's failure to gain congressional seats in the 2020 parliamentary snap election, Roca Cáceres criticized the controversial congressional nominations selected by the party's executive committee, blaming the poor results on the current leadership.

Trelles' tenure as party president ended on 18 October 2026, as the XXVI Party National Congress elected attorney and former State Procurement President Mónica Yaya as his successor.
