= Enrique Valderrama =

Peruvian journalist and politician

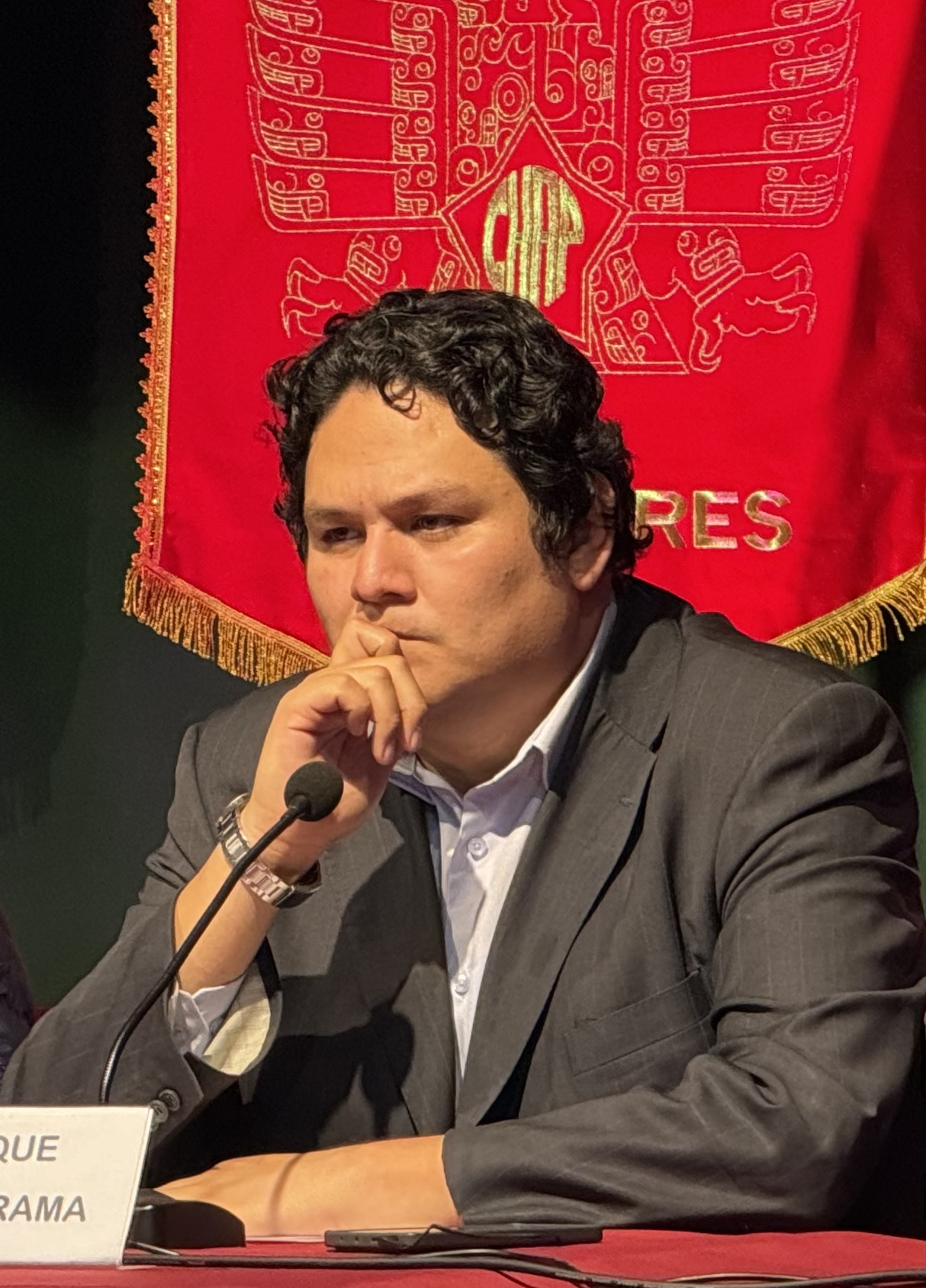
- In 2024 at the APRA’s Miraflores branch

Member of the National Political Commission of the Peruvian Aprista Party
- In office 10 December 2020 – 18 October 2026
- President: César Trelles

Personal details
- Born: Pitter Enrique Valderrama Peña; 14 April 1986 (age 40) Lima, Peru
- Party: Peruvian Aprista Party (2002–present)
- Spouse: Jennifer Guerra Espinoza (m. 2025)
- Education: Pontifical Catholic University of Peru; University of San Martín de Porres (LLB); International University of La Rioja
- Occupation: Politician; journalist

Pitter Enrique Valderrama Peña (born 14 April 1986) is a Peruvian politician, journalist, and former political commentator. A member of the Peruvian Aprista Party (APRA), he served as a member of the party's National Political Commission and was the party's presidential nominee for 2026 presidential election.

As a journalist, he serves as a columnist for Expreso. He is also the founder of the political affairs online portal Punto de Encuentro and the Centre for Social Democracy, a public policy think tank.

== Political career ==
Valderrama has been a member of the Peruvian Aprista Party since 2002, when he joined the party as a minor. He became a fully registered member in 2010. That same year, he was selected as a candidate for the Lima Metropolitan Council in the 2010 municipal election; however, the party's electoral list, headed by Carlos Roca as mayoral nominee, was ultimately withdrawn.

From 2011 to 2012, Valderrama served as General Secretary of the Aprista University Command at the Pontifical Catholic University of Peru, where he was then studying law. After an extended interruption in his studies, during which he worked in the social housing sector, he completed his law degree in 2022 at the University of San Martín de Porres. He is currently pursuing a master's degree in financial markets at the International University of La Rioja.

In July 2021, Valderrama was appointed by party leader César Trelles as a member of the party's National Political Commission. He was subsequently identified by commentators as part of a new generation of party leaders associated with efforts to renew the organization. Valderrama was also described as a close follower of former president Alan García, who mentored him during the final years of his political activity, as García sought to promote a new leadership within the party.

=== 2026 presidential run ===
On 19 September 2025, at a partisan rally held in Comas, Lima, Valderrama announced his candidacy for the Peruvian Aprista Party presidential nomination for the 2026 general election. The race was divided among 14 candidates, with former Prime Ministers Jorge del Castillo and Javier Velásquez, former minister Hernán Garrido Lecca, and Valderrama as the strongest contenders.

At the primary election held on 30 November 2025, Valderrama narrowly secured the party's presidential nomination, finishing first with 3,779 votes (25.80 percent), a margin of 198 votes over Velásquez, who received 3,581 votes (24.50 percent). The outcome was broadly seen as a major upset from an external perspective, since the more seasoned candidates were widely expected to prevail based on their established political careers and internal coalitions.

Valderrama was officially registered as the party's nominee on 2 January 2025 by the National Jury of Elections, without any objections being filed against the ticket.

== Electoral history ==
=== Executive ===
Election	Office	List	Votes			Result	Ref.
Election	Office	List	Total	%	P.	Result	Ref.
2026	President of Peru	Peruvian Aprista Party	161,248	0.96%	14th	Not elected	

=== Legislative ===
Election	Office	List	#	District	Votes			Result	Ref.
Election	Office	List	#	District	Total	%	P.	Result	Ref.
2026	Member of the Chamber of Deputies	Peruvian Aprista Party	10	Lima Metropolitan Area	9,579	2.02%	10th (Note: Presented on an electoral list. The data shown represents the share of the vote the entire party/alliance received in that constituency.)	Not elected	
