= American Popular Revolutionary Alliance =

Political party in Peru

Peruvian Aprista Party Partido Aprista Peruano
- Abbreviation: PAP; APRA
- President: Mónica Yaya
- General Secretaries: Enrique Melgar Moscoso (Institutional); Luciano Ponce (Political)
- Political Commission Chairman: José Pimentel Aliaga
- National Legal Representative: Estefanía Huamán Ojeda
- Founder: Víctor Raúl Haya de la Torre
- Founded: May 7, 1924; 102 years ago (Mexico); September 20, 1930; 96 years ago (Peru)
- Headquarters: Av. Alfonso Ugarte N° 1012, Breña, Lima
- Youth wing: Juventud Aprista Peruana
- Membership (2022): 50,000
- Ideology: Third Way; Latin American integration; Historical: Democratic socialism; Anti-clericalism; Left-wing populism; Left-wing nationalism; Social democracy
- Political position: Right-wing
- Regional affiliation: COPPPAL
- International affiliation: Socialist International
- Anthem: "La Marsellesa Aprista"
- Senate: 0 / 60
- Chamber of Deputies: 0 / 130
- Governorships: 0 / 25
- Regional Councillors: 2 / 364
- Province Mayorships: 2 / 196
- Province Councillors: 14 / 1,724
- District Mayorships: 9 / 1,696
- District Councillors: 54 / 9,118

Party flag

Website
- www.apraperu.com

The Peruvian Aprista Party (Spanish: Partido Aprista Peruano, PAP) is a Peruvian political party. The party was founded as the American Popular Revolutionary Alliance (Spanish: Alianza Popular Revolucionaria Americana, APRA) by Víctor Raúl Haya de la Torre, who originally intended to create a network of anti-imperialist social and political movements in Latin America. Members are called "compañeros" (roughly translated as 'partners'), based on the fraternity espoused by Haya de la Torre.

Facing international pressure from the United States, which was promoting anti-communism in the Americas, the party is said to have adopted a mild right-wing populist agenda by the 1940s. The party later adopted in 2006 a new platform as García's second presidency implemented a series of policies labelled as center-right, embracing free-market capitalism, dialogue with other right-wing parties and organizations in the country, and closer ties with the Catholic Church and Evangelical churches. A number of scholars say that the party has shifted to the right side of the left–right political spectrum.

Founded continentally in 1924 in Mexico City, Mexico, and nationally in 1930 in Lima, it is one of the oldest political parties in Latin America. Among the Peruvian political parties in activity, specifically for having been stripped of electoral victories by coups or military governments after having triumphed democratically, it also went through two long periods of illegality, both under military and civilian governments, having been persecuted by the presidencies of Luis Miguel Sánchez Cerro and Manuel A. Odría. The Peruvian Aprista Party has gained in the presidency in two occasions: in 1985 and 2006, both under the candidacy of Alan García. At parliamentary level, the party was represented uninterrupted from 1995 until 2020, falling below the electoral threshold to attain legislative representation.

Although APRA does not operate throughout Latin America as its founder envisioned for, it has served as a powerful influence for other social democratic Latin American political organizations, such as the PT in Brazil, the Democratic Action (AD) in Venezuela and the Socialist Party of Chile.

== History ==
=== 20th century ===
==== Original platform ====
APRA was founded by Víctor Raúl Haya de la Torre in Mexico City on 7 May 1924 with aspirations to becoming a continent-wide party, and it subsequently influenced a number of other Latin American political movements, including Bolivia's Revolutionary Nationalist Movement (Movimiento Nacionalista Revolucionario, MNR), Dominican Republic's Dominican Revolutionary Party (Partido Revolucionario Dominicano, PRD) and Costa Rica's National Liberation Party (Partido Liberación Nacional, PLN). The party was inspired by Haya de la Torre's observations of fascist and communist parties during his time in Europe.

Initial supporters for APRA in the 1920s mainly included middle-class and wealthy Peruvians who were upset with the sugar industry's modernization. It appealed to left-wing Peruvian intellectuals, as well as the nascent Peruvian labor movement. It is the oldest surviving political party in Peru and is as much a social phenomenon as a political movement, with a membership whose loyalty to the party has been unwavering for several generations. APRA initially espoused anti-imperialism, Pan-Americanism, international solidarity and economic nationalism. Years of repression and clandestinity, as well as Haya de la Torre's single-handed dominance of the party, resulted in striking sectarian and hierarchical traits. The party's structure and its hold over its rank and file proved more lasting than its original ideological platform.

In the 1930s, the party was banned after being inaccurately labeled as communist; Italy and the United States supported the ban as they believed APRA served as a front group for bolshevism. The conflict between APRA and the authoritarian government of Luis Miguel Sánchez Cerro led to civil war-like conditions. On 2 July 1932, APRA militants massacred sixty soldiers in Trujillo, which resulted in a violent response from President Sánchez Cerro that resulted with about 1,500 Apristas killed and the arrest of Haya de la Torre. Abelardo Mendoza Leyva, an Aprista, later assassinated President Sánchez Cerro on 30 April 1933.

==== Move to the right ====
By the late-1930s, the United States began to share statements that it would intervene in the Americas to prevent the spread of communism, frightening left-wing parties in Latin America. By the 1940s, in an attempt for political survival, APRA adopted anti-communist and mild right-wing populist agendas to appease international critics. An example of APRA’s move to a more moderate approach was demonstrated during a speech made prior to the 1945 general election, in which Haya de la Torre declared that “In Peru it is not a question of taking from those who have but rather of creating riches for those who have not.” In 1944, APRA became part of the National Democratic Front political coalition alongside other parties spanning the left and right of the political spectrum like the fascist Revolutionary Union party. The alliance led to the triumph of José Luis Bustamante y Rivero becoming president the same year. During the Bustamante presidency, APRA used its influence in Congress to pursue progressive policies such as improving the pay of government employees, encouraging labor union expansion, and introducing new rights for rural workers. During this period, APRA also made efforts to organize openly such as by opening up its own newspaper, setting up a network of youth groups and community centers, and helping those in need by providing legal aid, social assistance, and health services.

In the late 1950s, APRA was said to have shifted to the right-wing of the political spectrum. Many of its supporters became disillusioned and joined the Acción Popular.

==== Garcia presidency ====
After several years of military rule, APRA was allowed to participate as a legal political party in 1979. The party gathered strong support from the electorate, managing to win a majority of seats in the newly created Constituent Assembly, and supervised the first democratic elections in 12 years.

Haya de la Torre was elected president of the Constituent Assembly and was slated to run as the party's presidential candidate in 1980. However, he died before the election. The party was divided between Armando Villanueva and Andres Townsend, each claiming to be the political and ideological heir of Haya de la Torre. APRA chose Villanueva as its candidate, while Townsend and other members left the party to create the Hayist Bases Movement. The split among the Apristas allowed former president Fernando Belaúnde Terry of Acción Popular to win the election. APRA managed to win virtual control of both the Chamber of Deputies and the Senate. It was also during these election that Alan García started his political career, after being elected Deputy for the Province of Lima.

The youthful and charismatic García was elected president on 14 April 1985, with 45% of the vote during the first round. Since he did not receive the 50% of the vote required to win the presidency, García was required to enter the second round against Alfonso Barrantes Lingán (the leftist mayor of Lima) of the Izquierda Unida Coalition. Barrantes, however, decided not to enter the second round of the elections, saying he did not want to prolong the political uncertainty of the country.

García was thus declared president on 1 June and officially took power on 28 July 1985. It was the first time in its sixty-year history that the populist APRA party had come to power in Peru.

His presidency was marked by world-record hyperinflation with the annual rate exceeding 13,000 percent per year. García's administration devastated the local economy as well as all governmental institutions. Hunger, corruption, injustice, abuse of power, elitism, and social unrest raised to dramatic levels spreading throughout the whole nation, spurring terrorism.

At García's farewell speech, he was booed by the entire opposition forces and prevented from speaking. The anecdotal event was televised. That same day the board of the Chamber of Deputies requested the creation of a special committee to investigate García's presidency, accusing him of massive corruption and illicit enrichment. The committee attacked García with numerous proven accusations involving embezzlement, misappropriation and bribery, based – among other trustworthy sources – on a U.S. congressional investigation that linked García with the BCCI scandal and had found millions of dollars in banks. New York District Attorney Robert Morgenthau charged García officially. Later in 1992, then Senator John Kerry presided over the BCCI Scandal Report, (The BCCI Affair) which concluded that García was not only guilty of corruption, but also directly involved in an international racketeering network with activities that included drug and arms trafficking. Finally, the Peruvian Supreme Court, overturned prior judicial verdicts and declared all the probes and constitutional accusations against García "null".

In May 1989, APRA chose as its standard bearer Luis Alva Castro for the 1990 general election. For the final runoff, APRA sealed a hidden deal with Cambio 90 and Alberto Fujimori, to prevent the leading candidate Mario Vargas Llosa, today a Nobel laureate and renown novelist and political analyst, from getting elected. Fujimori, a complete unknown, was subsequently elected.

==== Fujimori presidency ====
As Fujimori assumed the presidency in 1990, Congress was dominated by the opposition forces of Mario Vargas Llosa's Democratic Front. Fujimori's party had gained only 32 deputies out of 180, and 14 senators out of 60. The majority was divided between APRA (22%) and the Democratic Front, with about 32% of Congress. In 1992, Fujimori organized a successful coup d'état. This allowed García to flee Peru and request asylum denouncing political persecution, the asylum was granted by Colombian president César Gaviria. Shortly after, under the protection of president Francois Mitterrand, García received again the privilege of political refuge and left Colombia to reside in Paris.

Fujimori convened elections for a Democratic Constituent Congress, in which APRA did not participate. In the 1995 general elections, the APRA nominee for president was Mercedes Cabanillas, gaining only 4%, behind former United Nations Secretary General Javier Pérez de Cuéllar (21%) and the reelected Fujimori (64%). The party only won 8 congressmen out of 120, while Fujimori's Cambio 90-New Majority dominated Congress with 67.

=== 21st century ===
In 2000, Abel Salinas was elected as the presidential nominee, being the worst general election for APRA, gaining only 1% of the popular vote. Only 6 APRA congressman were elected. As many assume the election was a fraud, Fujimori resigned after the corruption of his government was revealed by the opposition.

At the legislative elections, the party won 19.7% of the popular vote and 28 out of 120 seats in Congress. Its presidential candidate at the elections of the same day, Alan García Pérez, won 25.8% of the vote, placing second and was defeated in the second round by Alejandro Toledo.

In February 2005, García officially commenced his campaign for the 2006 presidential election. He came in second place by a slim margin over Lourdes Flores, and faced Ollanta Humala in a run-off election on 4 June. He became president again as Humala conceded after exit polls and partial vote counts showed García leading. Breaking News, World News and Video from Al Jazeera. He officially took office on 28 July 2006.

==== Alliance with Keiko Fujimori ====
On the eve of leaving the government, García called a general election for 10 April 2011. APRA ran as a guest presidential candidate for former minister Mercedes Aráoz, but her candidacy was frustrated by numerous internal conflicts with other party leaders. In this way, the party participated in the elections without a candidate, obtaining 4 seats in Congress. It has remained an organized opposition party against the Ollanta Humala administration. For the 2016 elections, APRA signed an alliance with the Partido Popular Cristiano and Vamos Perú, under the title of "Alianza Popular (Popular Alliance)", with Alan García as the presidential candidate, who will serve a third term and long-time rival Lourdes Flores as Garcia's first running mate. According to Javier Barreda, this alliance did not benefit these three parties at all.

In the 2016 elections, Alan García lost resoundingly, remaining in fifth place with 6.19%. Hours later, he resigned from the APRA presidency calling for an "internal restructuring of the party." On 13 May 2016, a political alliance between APRA and Keiko Fujimori is created. In this alliance, APRA and Fujimori's Popular Force party collaborate to target political opponents implicated in the Odebrecht corruption scandal, using sympathetic prosecutors and judges to accused rivals of corruption.

==== Post-García era ====
On 17 April 2019, former President Alan García died at the Casimiro Ulloa Hospital in Miraflores after shooting himself in the head after a preliminary search and arrest warrant against him due to the Odebrecht corruption scandal.

In the extraordinary congressional elections of 2020, held after the dissolution of Congress in 2019, the APRA had its worst electoral result of 2.7%, failing to pass the 5% electoral threshold, which means that it would not have parliamentary representation after 25 uninterrupted years. However, it managed to maintain the registration as a political party since it was an extraordinary electoral process.

In 2020, the party chose former Minister Nidia Vílchez as its presidential candidate for the 2021 general elections. However, and because the Special Electoral Jury (JEE) declared the party's congressional list inadmissible, they decided to withdraw Vílchez's candidacy for the presidency. In the 2026 Peruvian general election, APRA saw low support, with its candidate receiving less than 1% of votes.

== International alignment ==
APRA is a member of the Socialist International.

The youth organization of APRA is known as Juventud Aprista Peruana.

Hilda Gadea – the first female Secretary of the Economy of the Executive National Committee for APRA; later married Che Guevara and wrote a memoir.

== Current structure and composition ==
=== National Executive Committee ===
The National Executive Committee (Comité Ejecutivo Nacional, CEN) is the principal executive and administrative body of the Peruvian Aprista Party (APRA), responsible for implementing the party's political directives, coordinating its organizational structure, and overseeing the activities of its regional, provincial, and district committees. Under the party's statute, the committee ensures the implementation of resolutions adopted by the National Congress and other governing bodies, promotes organizational cohesion, and supports the decentralization of decision-making among the party's grassroots organizations.

The committee is accountable to the National Congress, the party's highest governing authority, and operates in accordance with the political directives established by the National Political Commission. Its membership comprises the two general secretaries, deputy general secretaries, national secretaries, presidents of national commissions, and representatives of the party's parliamentary, regional, and affiliated organizations. The functions and responsibilities of its constituent secretariats and commissions are regulated by the party's General Rules of Organization.

The committee is jointly headed by two general secretaries, the Institutional General Secretary (Secretario General Institucional) and the Political General Secretary (Secretario General Político), who are elected by the Party National Congress for four-year terms. Together, they oversee the party's political, organizational, and administrative affairs and are responsible for implementing resolutions adopted by its governing bodies.

The current National Executive Committee is headed by Enrique Melgar Moscoso and Luciano Ponce Lancho, both former national secretaries of Organization and Mobilization. They were elected at the XXVI National Congress, held in Trujillo, La Libertad, from 16 to 18 October 2026.

==== Current leadership ====
- Institutional General Secretary: Enrique Melgar Moscoso
- Political General Secretary: Luciano Ponce Lancho
- Deputy Institutional General Secretary: Carmen Vargas Palomino
- Deputy Political General Secretary: Claudia Cecilia Espinoza Borra
- Secretary of Organization and Mobilization: Lucio Antonio Vásquez Sánchez
- Secretary of Discipline: Roberto Aldoradín Valencia
- Secretary of Professional Caucuses: Mercedes Milagros Núñez Gutiérrez
- Secretary of Unions and Workers: Ángel Armando Sánchez Dueñas
- Secretary of Popular Organizations: Marlene Gutiérrez Astudillo
- Secretary of Civilian Organizations: Teresa Vanessa Vílchez Ninahuanca
- Secretary of Social Management: Gladys Doris Siancas Adanaque
- Secretary of Production and Micro/Small Business: Raúl Eduardo Yauri Zamudio
- Secretary of Inter-institutional Coordination: Gloria Luz Rocío Martell Díaz
- Secretary of Training: Luis Alberto Pacheco Mandujano
- Secretary of González Prada People's University: Carlos Máximo Chamochumbi Barrueto
- Secretary of Political Training: Luis Martín Casavilca Cabana
- Secretary of Education and Professional Training: Verónica Cielo Padilla Veliz
- Secretary of Regional Governments: Carlos Mario Zanelli Vásquez
- Secretary of Local Governments: Javier Travezaño Dextre
- Secretary of Women: Kelly Victoria Coronado Benites
- Secretary of Youth: Linda Elena Brigitte Flores Robledo
- Secretary of Press and Broadcast: Isabel Miguelina Oviedo Trujillo
- Secretary of Propaganda: Carmen Victoria Albújar Martínez
- Secretary of Electoral Technique: Manuel Ángel Labandera Cano
- Secretary of International Relations: Víctor Andrés Marroquín-Merino Torres
- Secretary of Sports Affairs: Edson Elías Grijvalva Purizaga
- Secretary of Culture: María Luisa Lannata Pino

=== Office of the President of the Party ===
The Office of the President of the Party (Presidencia del Partido) is the highest executive office of the Peruvian Aprista Party (APRA). Under Article 29 of the party's statute, the president is responsible for the party's political and institutional leadership, represents the organization before the public, and presides over meetings of its permanent and non-permanent governing bodies. The president is elected by the Ordinary National Congress, which remains the party's supreme governing authority.

The office was established in 1985 following the electoral victory of Alan García, the first member of the party to be elected President of Peru. Initially associated with García's personal leadership and established in recognition of his presidential achievement, the office subsequently became a permanent position within the party's organizational structure. The presidency is distinct from the historical designation of Chief (Jefe), traditionally reserved for the party's founder, Víctor Raúl Haya de la Torre.

The incumbent president is Mónica Yadira Yaya Luyo, a Peruvian lawyer and former president of the State Procurement Tribunal, who was elected at the XXVI National Congress of the party, held in Trujillo, La Libertad, from 16 to 18 October 2026.

- President: Mónica Yaya Luyo

=== National Political Commission ===
The National Political Commission (Comisión Política Nacional) is a collegiate governing body of the Peruvian Aprista Party (APRA). Under Article 30 of the party's statute, the commission is responsible for guiding and, where expressly authorised, determining the actions of the party's permanent governing bodies on matters of national political significance, in accordance with its ideological principles and political programme.

Its statutory powers include deciding on the formation of electoral alliances, determining the methods by which the party selects its electoral candidates, directly appointing candidates within the limits established by electoral law, and determining their placement on electoral lists in accordance with gender parity and alternation requirements. The commission exercises these powers subject to the party's statute and applicable Peruvian electoral legislation.

The commission consists of twelve members: a president and four members elected by the Party National Congress, four members appointed by the party president, and three ex officio members representing the National Executive Committee: the Institutional Secretary General, the Political Secretary General, and the National Secretary of Organization. Decisions are adopted by an absolute majority of eligible members, with the presiding officer holding a casting vote in the event of a tie.

The commission is currently chaired by José Pimentel Aliaga, a Peruvian lawyer and former national legal representative of the party, who was elected at the XXVI National Congress, held in Trujillo, La Libertad, from 16 to 18 October 2026.

==== Current leadership ====
Notable members

José Pimentel Aliaga, Chairman and former party legal representative

Enrique Melgar Moscoso, Institutional General Secretary and former National Secretary of Organization and Mobilization

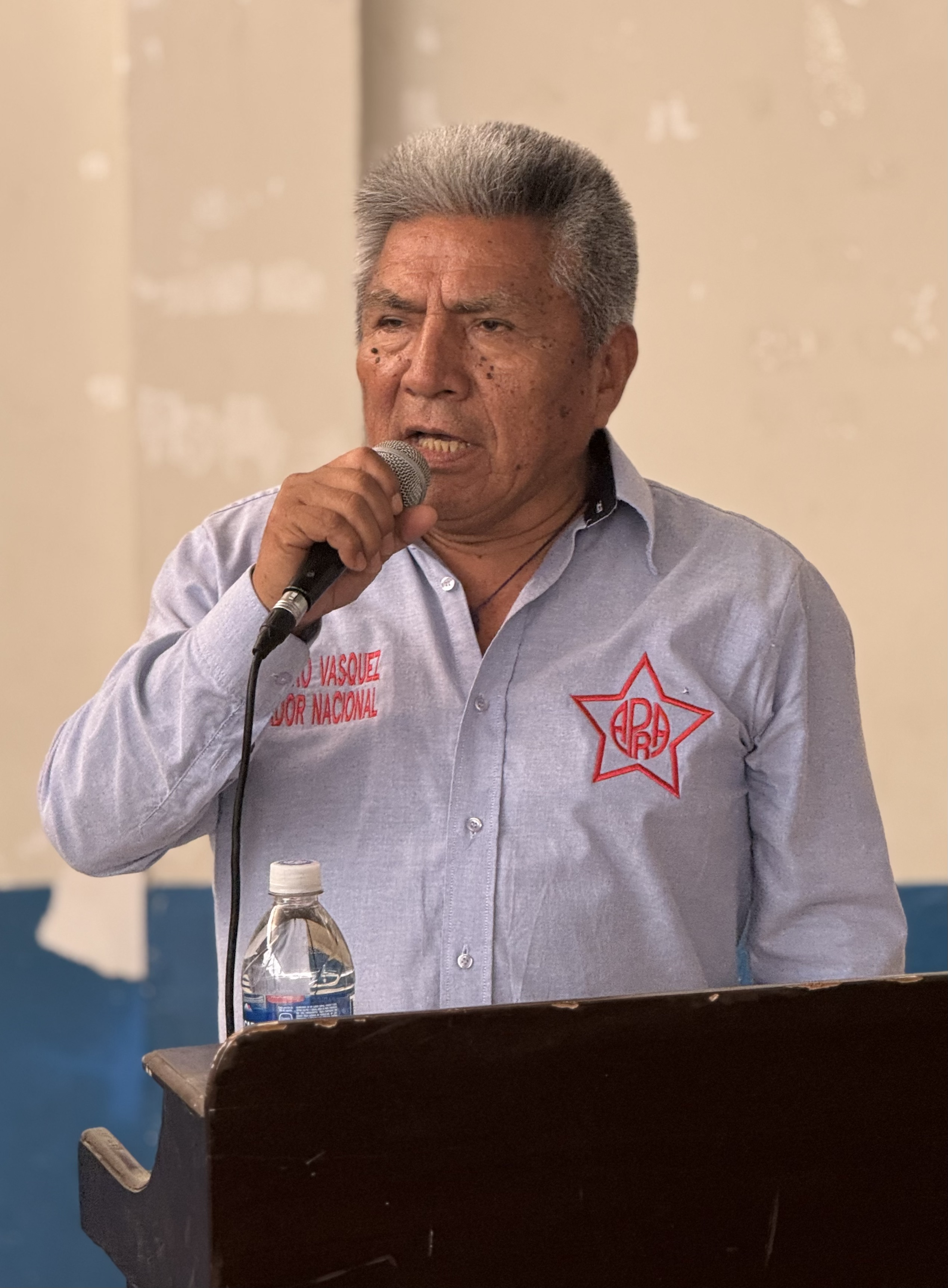
Lucio Antonio "Mochero" Vásquez, former vice presidential nominee and National Secretary of Organization and Mobilization

- Elected by the 2026 Party National Congress:
  - Chairman: José Pimentel Aliaga
  - Carmen Najarro Quispe
  - Elías Grijalva Alvarado
  - Víctor Eduardo Arévalo Ramírez
  - Félix Antonio Mauricio Alor
- Appointed by the presidency:
  - TBD
  - TBD
  - TBD
  - TBD
- From the National Executive Committee:
  - Enrique Melgar Moscoso
  - Luciano Ponce Lancho
  - Lucio Antonio Vásquez Sánchez

== Election results ==
=== Presidential elections ===
Election	Nominee	First round		Second round		Result
Election	Nominee	Votes	%	Votes	%	Result
1931	Víctor Raúl Haya de la Torre	106,088	35.38	—N/a		Lost ✗
1945 (Note: As part of National Democratic Front)	José Bustamante y Rivero	305,590	66.96	—N/a		Elected ✓
1962	Víctor Raúl Haya de la Torre	557,007	32.97	—N/a		Annulled ✗
1963	Víctor Raúl Haya de la Torre	623,501	34.36	—N/a		Lost ✗
1980	Armando Villanueva	1,087,188	27.24	—N/a		Lost ✗
1985	Alan García	3,457,030	53.10	—N/a		Elected ✓
1990	Luis Alva Castro	1,507,905	22.64	—N/a		Lost ✗
1995	Mercedes Cabanillas	306,108	4.11	—N/a		Lost ✗
2000	Abel Salinas	153,319	1.38	—N/a		Lost ✗
2001	Alan García	2,732,857	25.78	4,904,929	46.92	Lost ✗
2006	Alan García	2,985,858	24.32	6,965,017	52.63	Elected ✓
2011	Mercedes Aráoz	Nomination withdrawn				
2016 (Note: As part of Popular Alliance)	Alan García	894,278	5.83	—N/a		Lost ✗
2021	Nidia Vílchez	Nomination withdrawn				
2026	Enrique Valderrama	161,248	0.96	—N/a		Lost ✗

=== Congressional results ===
==== Unicameral Congress of the Republic ====
Election	Leader	Votes	%	Seats	+/–	Position
1995	Agustín Mantilla	274,263	6.4%	8 / 120	Steady	Opposition
2000	Jorge del Castillo	546,930	5.5%	6 / 120	▼2	Opposition
2001	Alan García	1,857,416	19.7%	28 / 120	▲22	Opposition
2006	Alan García	2,213,562	20.6%	36 / 120	▲8	Government
2011	Alan García	825,030	6.4%	4 / 130	▼32	Opposition
2016	Alan García	1,013,735	8.3% as part of Popular Alliance	5 / 130	▲1	Opposition
2020	César Trelles	402,330	2.7%	0 / 130	▼5	Extra-parliamentary
2021	César Trelles	Barred from participating		0 / 130	Steady	Extra-parliamentary

==== Senate ====
Election	Leader	Votes	%	Seats	+/–	Position
1945	Víctor Raúl Haya de la Torre		in coalition with FDN	35 / 49	▲35	Majority
1962	Víctor Raúl Haya de la Torre		in coalition with MDP	25 / 55	▼10	Minority
1963	Víctor Raúl Haya de la Torre			18 / 45	▲18	Minority
1980	Armando Villanueva	1,144,203	27.6%	18 / 60	Steady	Minority
1985	Alan García	3,099,975	51.3% in coalition with DC-SODE	32 / 60	▲14	Majority
1990	Alan García	1,390,954	25.1%	16 / 60	▼16	Minority
Unicameral Congress between 1995 and 2026
2026	César Trelles	253,499	1.71%	0 / 60	0	Extra-parliamentary

==== Chamber of Deputies ====
Election	Leader	Votes	%	Seats	+/–	Position
1945	Víctor Raúl Haya de la Torre		in coalition with FDN	73 / 186	▲73	Minority
1962	Víctor Raúl Haya de la Torre		in coalition with MDP	85 / 186	▲12	Minority
1963	Víctor Raúl Haya de la Torre			56 / 139	▼29	Minority
1980	Armando Villanueva	962,801	26.5%	58 / 180	▲2	Minority
1985	Alan García	2,920,605	50.1% in coalition with DC-SODE	107 / 180	▲49	Majority
1990	Alan García	1,240,395	25.0%	53 / 180	▼54	Minority
Unicameral Congress between 1995 and 2026
2026	César Trelles	268,803	1.86%	0 / 180	0	Extra-parliamentary

=== Elections to the Constituent Congresses and Assemblies ===
Election	Leader	Votes	%	Seats	+/–	Position
1931	Víctor Raúl Haya de la Torre			27 / 145	▲27	Minority
1978	Víctor Raúl Haya de la Torre	1,241,174	35.3%	37 / 100	▲10	Minority
1992	Agustín Mantilla	Boycotted		0 / 80	▼37	Extra-parliamentary

== Bibliography ==
- John A. Mackay, That Other America (New York: The Friendship Press, 1935), 102–116.
- Harry Kantor, The Ideology and Program of the Peruvian Aprista Movement (Berkeley: University of California Press. London: Cambridge University Press, 1953. Reprinted, New York: Octagon Books, Inc., 1966).
- W. Stanley Rycroft, “Intellectual Renaissance in Latin America,” Book Review of The Ideology and Program of the Peruvian Aprista Movement, by Harry Kantor, in International Review of Missions, vol. 43, no. 2 (April 1954), 220–223.
