= First presidency of Alan García =

- First presidency of Alan García; 28 July 1985 – 28 July 1990
- Vice President: Luis Alberto Sánchez and Luis Alva Castro together
- Cabinet: See list
- Party: Peruvian Aprista
- Election: 1985
- Standard of the President

The first presidency of Alan García governing Peru was from 1985 to 1990. He regained the presidency in 2006.

== Election ==
On 14 April 1985, Alan García was elected President of Peru after winning the 1985 Peruvian general election securing 53.1% of the popular vote. In addition, his party, the American Popular Revolutionary Alliance, emerged as the largest faction in both houses of Congress. At the time of his election, García enjoyed high popularity attributed to his youth, oratory skills and charisma.

The change of command ceremony was attended by the presidents Raúl Alfonsín of Argentina, Julio Maria Sanguinetti of Uruguay, Belisario Betancourt of Colombia, Hernan Siles of Bolivia, Nicolás Ardito Barletta of Panama, and Salvador Jorge Blanco of Dominican Republic. Also was present James Baker, United States Secretary of Treasury.

In October 1985, Newsweek called him the most important political star to emerge in Latin America since Juan Domingo Perón. In December, the magazine placed García among the ten most outstanding personalities in the world.

== Economy ==
=== Beginning ===
At first, the measures taken were positive. Already in September 1985, inflation fell to 3.5% (compared with 12.5% in April of that year). By the second quarter of 1986, the economy showed clear signs of recovery. The sectors that relied on domestic demand (manufacturing, construction, agriculture) grew, but not those engaged in the export sectors (mining, fishing). In 1986, the economy grew 10%. It was the biggest increase since the 1950s, with it then Garcia enjoyed record popularity throughout Latin America. When the spending power of the state was exhausted then began multiple problems.

The first problem was that despite economic resurgence, the state hardly received higher income. another problem was that the modest capacity of the domestic industry was reaching its limits. Further investments and foreign capital were required to install new capabilities and continue with economic growth and recovery. This led to increased dependency on foreign loans and investments.

Low public confidence in the government's monetary policy led to many consumers buying dollars over Intis, thus causing mass devaluation of the Inti. The package of measures adopted by Garcia included the freezing of the exchange rate from Inti to dollar. The freezing did little to stop the real demand of dollar over Inti. By 1989 hyperinflation dominated the monetary situation of Peru.

=== Danger of crisis ===
In 1987, the danger of a crisis in the balance of payments and international reserves was evident. However, the Peruvian Government continued to rely on rapid economic growth until 1988. At the same time, they had to accept the devaluation of the inti, rising wages and prices.

Overall, the Peruvian government's economic policy began to fall into contradictions. On the one hand, the government sought direct contact with major employers (called the twelve apostles) to persuade them to invest in the development of productive capacity. On the other side and their need to increase state revenues, allegedly forced in early 1987, companies to lend money to the state.

Specifically, companies were forced to buy the mandatory Peruvian bonds worth reaching up to 30% of gross profit that the companies had obtained in 1986 (69). With this measure, the government provoked angry reactions in the corporate sector. Soon, some companies were exempted from mandatory payment and finally the program was canceled.

Such ups and downs, of reactions to a fait accompli, passivity against the dangers ahead contributed to the perception that government economic policy was being improvised and, above all, losing control. The situation worsened with the resignation in June 1987, the Minister of Economy Luis Alva Castro.

=== Nationalization of the Banking ===
The breaking point was his Government's intention to nationalize the banks as a way to control inflation which, at that point (July 28 of 1987) was overwhelming. Indeed, economic indicators show that Peru during this tenure suffered hyperinflation of 1722.3% in 1988 and 2775% in 1989.

The measure was announced on July 28, 1987 in the traditional address to the nation. Garcia said his measure would reduce social and economic inequality in Peru. As early as 1982 he had published a book ( The different future) in which he criticized private banks to exclude the credit system to the informal sectors: farms and small and medium enterprises (SMEs). According to the government's economic policy, it was necessary to "democratize" the credit and, as the private sector was unwilling to assume this task, the state should take over. Despite this, the Congress of the Republic of Peru did not approve the measure.

=== 1988–1989: Crisis ===
At the end of 1987, the crisis was already evident: Inflation started to gallop (114.5% in December 1987), production – and hence economic recovery – has been stalled and the balance of payments had, in 1987, a deficit of $521 million, the largest gap since 1981. Consequently, international reserves continued to decline. A lack of dollars, the Central Reserve Bank of Peru was bound hand in controlling the rate of change (increasing demand for dollars can be offset by circulating the dollars saved).

Forced by circumstances to a change of course, the government resorted to late 1987, the International Monetary Fund and the World Bank for loans. The unorthodox experiment had ended. In October 1987, the government moved to devalue the inti at 24%. The so-called paquetazos continued to occur on a regular basis, until September 1988, leading to a recession. But Garcia was still not accept the need for a clear line

Garcia's economic team, led by Gustavo Saberbein, Garcia tried to persuade the Orthodox need for a shock: zero deficit through tax increases fuertísimos and tariffs and the elimination of subsidies. But Garcia, fearing the political cost of such a decision, only agreed to a middle way without solving the problem: A bankrupt state (fiscal deficit) and an economy that mattered more than it exported (trade deficit).

The results are in the collective memory of all Peruvians: Inflation to astronomical levels, food shortages and other commodities and the collapse of Alan Garcia's approval. It was not until late 1988 that Garcia was convinced of the need for a "war" against the economic crisis. The new Minister of Economy and Finance, Abel Salinas, had the thankless task of announcing, now, the economic shock, on September 6 of 1988.

The plan, called Plan Zero, helped generate even higher inflation, especially in relation to the goods imported. For example, the price of pharmaceuticals up 600% and 400% of the gasoline. In addition, it eliminated the price control system with the exception of 42 commodities (208).

The Peruvian Aprista Party's hopes were now pinned on the World Bank and IMF. While there were talks, Peru did not receive loans. This was due, too, that Peru still owed $600 million to the IMF and 400 million World Bank.

From September 1988, inflation became what economists call hyperinflation. That month, prices rose 114%. It was the month with the highest inflation in the Garcia administration and probably in the history of Peru. And the shock seemed to come too late. In any case, could not control inflation.

A long strike in the mining industry contributed to falling exports and further aggravate the trade deficit. International reserves, meanwhile, were close to zero.

On November 22, 1988, Garcia threw another "package" with similar measures. At the same time, Abel Salinas submitted his resignation due to differences with Garcia.

Rising unemployment and falling incomes drastic was the social cost of economic disaster leading to the emergence of an informal sector of proportions never seen before. In addition, the bankrupt state could no longer meet its obligations welfare, education, health and justice.

The years 1989 and 1990 can be narrated briefly, because there were no substantial changes. The economy recovered slightly and international reserves as well. Imports fell and exports rose, especially by increasing the price of mining products in the international market.

Under the command of the new Minister of Economy, Cesar Vásquez Bazán, inflation fell, but not substantially. The annual rate of inflation was 2000% in 1989. The last months of 1989 were used to spend the meager reserves to revive the economy somewhat in view of the prompt elections. Thus, in March 1990, international reserves were barely $190 million.

== Social Aspect ==
=== Terrorism ===
Another issue that rocked the government of Alan Garcia was terrorist activity that began during the previous government of Fernando Belaunde Terry but reached the highest peaks of violence in the years of 1986 and 1988. Within this context there was the case of the killing of terrorist rioters in different prisons Lima on June 19 of 1986.

During the presidency of Alan Garcia, along with subversive violence, which claimed thousands of lives, there were acts of military repression, such as the massacre of the prisons and the slaughter of dozens of farmers in the Ayacucho community of Cayara in 1988. Although Garcia initially showed interest in curbing human rights violations after the incident of criminal allowed to continue counter-violence of the armed forces and formed death squads (Rodrigo Franco Command), the suspected terrorists intimidated critics and counter-terrorism policy.

From 1988 and 1989 terrorist groups intensified their wave of attacks in Lima and several other cities against government impotence.

The controversy was re-occur when within twenty days of the transfer to the new government, Víctor Polay, "Comandante Rolando" and 47 members of the Tupac Amaru Revolutionary Movement managed to escape the prison of "maximum security" of Canto Grande through a tunnel built 330 meters from outside the prison. The building had no water or sewer connections, lighting facilities and services that would facilitate either a vent operational work.

Beyond the fact itself, the effect obtained by the Tupac Amaru Revolutionary Movement (MRTA), nationally and internationally, was a tough challenge not only to the Peruvian government counter-insurgency strategy, but also the operational capacity of and criminal law enforcement authorities of the country.

== Opposition and end of the presidency ==
Opposition to the government grew significantly from the attempt to nationalize the banks, a move that was deeply unpopular and fired a strong protest movement political right led by the writer Mario Vargas Llosa this movement eventually evolve into a political alliance FREDEMO (which included the Christian People's Party, Popular Action and Liberty Movement) who ran unsuccessfully in the 1990 Peruvian general election with Vargas Llosa's presidential candidacy. In his last message to the nation, July 28 of 1990 in the Congress in a reprehensible attitude, not allowed to speak, constantly interrupting him by blunders.

Economic instability and terrorism provoked the discontent of the Peruvian population, that the election of 1990 elected as President Alberto Fujimori.

=== Presidential approval ===
Garcia's approval in September 1985 was 90% according to the polling support, in December of that year, his 82% approval esuvo. He began 1986 with a 72% approval in April of that year regained popularity and approval rose to 85%, but in July of that year dropped to 70%, as the months passed, year-end approval dropped to 67%. Approval in 1987 continued to decline, being 52% in June, five months fell to 38%. The following year he started with 43%, but the middle of this down to 34% and continued to plummet to 13% (in December). In 1989 the figures continued to fall and started the year with 9% approval rating, at the end of that year approval rose to 14% and in 1990 continued to rise, with 21% in July.

== Authorities ==
=== Judiciary ===
The ones who served as Presidents of the Supreme Court of Peru:

President of the Supreme Court of Justice of Peru	Term
César Barrós Conti	January 3 of 1985 – January 3 of 1986
Héctor Beltrán Rivera	January 3 of 1986 – January 3 of 1987
Juan Vicente Ugarte del Pino	January 3 of 1987 – January 3 of 1988
Juan Méndez	January 3 de 1988 – January 3 of 1989
Óscar Alfaro Álvarez	January 3 of 1989 – January 3 of 1990
Eloy Espinosa Saldaña	January 3 of 1990 – January 3 of 1991

=== Vice-Presidents ===
Vice-Presidency	Name
1st	Luis Alberto Sánchez Sánchez
2nd	Luis Alva Castro

=== Ministers ===
Ministry	Ministers	In Office
Presidency of the Council of Ministers	Luis Alva Castro; Guillermo Larco Cox; Armando Villanueva del Campo; Luis Alberto Sánchez Sánchez; Guillermo Larco Cox	July 28 of 1985 – June 26 of 1987; June 27 of 1987 – May 13 of 1988; May 13 of 1988 – May 15 of 1989; May 15 of 1989 – September 30 of 1989; September 30 of 1989 – July 28 of 1990
Foreign Relations (Chancellor)	Allan Wagner Tizón; Luis Gonzales Posada; Guillermo Larco Cox	July 28 of 1985 – May 13 of 1988; May 13 of 1988 – March 1 of 1989; March 1 of 1989 – July 28 of 1990
Defence	Enrique López Albújar Trint; Julio Velásquez Giacarini	October 14 1987 – May 15 1989; May 15 1989 – July 28 1990
Agriculture	Augusto Barturén Dueñas; Remigio Morales Bermúdez Pedraglio; Juan Manuel Coronado Balmaceda; Isaac Roberto Angeles Lazo	July 28 of 1985 – January 9 of 1986; January 9 of 1986 – October 11 of 1988; October 11 of 1988 – October 28 of 1989; October 28 of 1989 – July 28 of 1990
Labour and Social Promotion	Carlos Blancas Bustamante; Orestes Rodríguez Campos; Wilfredo Chau Villanueva	July 28 of 1985 – June 25 of 1986; June 25 of 1986 – September 4 of 1989; September 4 of 1989 – July 28 of 1990
Economy and Finance	Luis Alva Castro; Gustavo Saberbein Chevalier; César Robles Freyre; Abel Salinas Izaguirre; Carlos Rivas Dávila; César Vásquez Bazán	July 28 of 1985 – June 27 of 1987; June 27 of 1987 – May 13 of 1988; May 13 of 1988 – September 2 of 1988; September 2 of 1988 – November 28 of 1988; November 28 of 1988 – May 15 of 1989; May 15 of 1989 – July 28 of 1990
Transportation and Communications	José Humberto Murguía Zannier; Julio Parra Herrera; Francisco Maury López; Camilo Carrillo Gómez; Luis Heysen Zegarra; Oswaldo Morán Márquez; Augusto Valqui Malpica	July 28 of 1985 – June 27 of 1987; June 27 of 1987 – July 16 of 1988; July 16 of 1988 – September 6 of 1988; September 6 of 1988 – March 11 of 1989; March 11 of 1989 – October 6 of 1989; October 6 of 1989 – May 9 of 1990; May 9 of 1990 – July 28 of 1990
Housing, Construction and Sanitation	Luis Bedoya Vélez; Antenor Orrego Spelucín	July 28 of 1985 – March 1 of 1989; March 1 of 1989 – July 28 of 1990
Health	David Tejada de Rivero; Ilda Paroni de Arias; Luis Pinillos Ashton; David Tejada de Rivero; Paul Caro Gamarra	July 28 of 1985 – June 27 of 1987; June 27 of 1987 – May 13 of 1988; May 13 of 1988 – May 15 of 1989; May 15 of 1989 – October 4 of 1989; October 4 of 1989 – July 28 of 1990
Energy and Mines	Wilfredo Huayta Núñez; Abel Salinas Izaguirre; José Carlos Carrasco Távara; Mario Samamé Boggio	July 28 of 1985 – June 27 of 1987; June 27 of 1987 – September 5 of 1988; September 5 of 1988 – May 15 of 1989; May 15 of 1989 – July 28 of 1990
Education	Grover Pango Vildoso; Mercedes Cabanillas Bustamante; Efraín Orbegozo Rodríguez; Mercedes Cabanillas Bustamante	July 28 of 1985 – June 27 of 1987; June 27 of 1987 – July 28 of 1989; July 28 of 1989 – May 9 of 1990; May 9 of 1990 – July 28 of 1990
Interior	Abel Salinas Izaguirre; José Barsallo Burga; Juan Soria Díaz; Armando Villanueva del Campo; Agustín Mantilla Campos	July 28 of 1985 – June 27 of 1987; June 27 of 1987 – May 13 of 1988; May 13 of 1988 – March 2 of 1989; March 2 of 1989 – May 15 of 1989; May 15 of 1989 – July 28 of 1990
Justice	Luis Gonzales Posada; Carlos Blancas Bustamante; Gonzalo Durand Aspíllaga; Camilo Carrillo Gómez; César Delgado Barreto; María Bockos Heredia de Grillo; Joffré Fernández Valdivieso	July 28 of 1985 – July 25 of 1986; July 25 of 1986 – February 16 of 1988; February 16 of 1988 – April 5 of 1988; April 5 of 1988 – September 2 of 1988; September 2 of 1988 – August 29 of 1989; August 29 of 1989 – May 9 of 1990; May 9 of 1990 – July 28 of 1990
Fishing	José Palomino Roedel; Javier Labarthe Correa; Rómulo León Alegría; Willy Harm Esparza; Juan Rebaza Carpio	July 28 of 1985 – June 27 of 1987; June 27 of 1987 – June 17 of 1988; June 17 of 1988 – May 15 of 1989; May 15 of 1989 – September 30 of 1989; September 30 of 1989 – July 28 of 1990
Presidency	Nicanor Mujica Alvárez-Calderón; Guillermo Larco Cox; Armando Villanueva del Campo; Luis Alberto Sánchez Sánchez; Rodolfo Beltrán Bravo	July 28 of 1985 – June 27 of 1987; June 27 of 1987 – May 13 of 1988; May 13 of 1988 – May 15 of 1989; May 15 of 1989 – September 30 of 1989; September 30 of 1989 – July 28 of 1990
Industry, Tourism, Integration and International Commercial Negotiations	César Atala Nazzal; Manuel Romero Caro; Alberto Vera La Rosa; Guillermo Artega Rashlton; Juan García Cabrejos; Carlos Raffo Dasso	July 28 of 1985 – December 13 of 1985; December 13 of 1985 – October 2 of 1987; October 2 of 1987 – May 13 of 1988; May 13 of 1988 – September 2 of 1988; September 2 of 1988 – March 1 of 1989; March 1 of 1989 – July 28 of 1990
Aviation	José Guerra Lorenzetti	July 28 1985 – April 1 1987
Navy	Willy Harm Esparza	July 28 1985 – April 1 1987
War	Jorge Flores Torres	July 28 1985 – April 1 1987

Political offices
Preceded by Second Presidency of Fernando Belaúnde	Government of Peru; 28 July 1985–28 July 1990	Succeeded by Presidency of Alberto Fujimori
