= Javier Labarthe Correa =

Peruvian naval officer and businessman

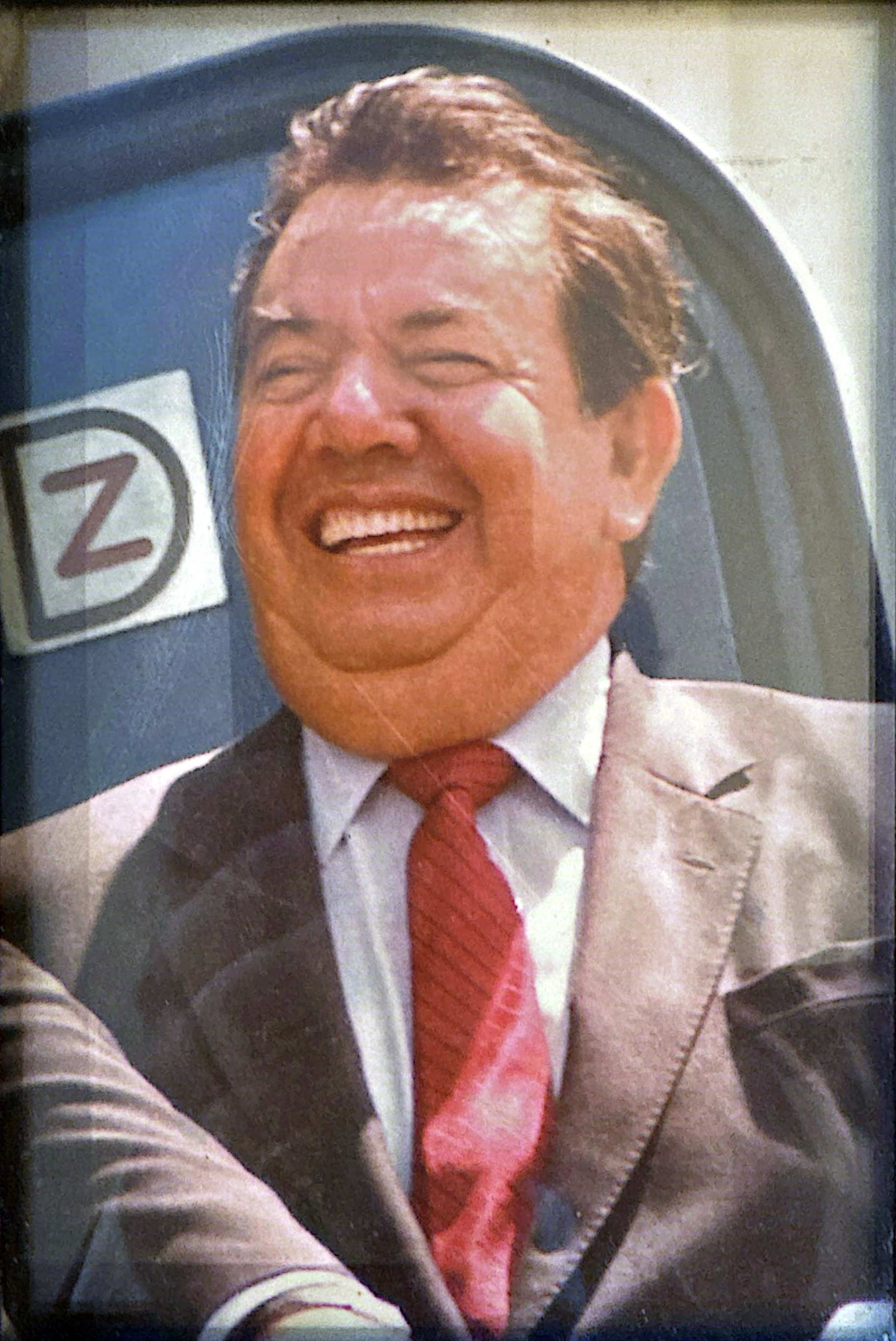
- Labarthe in 1988

Minister of Fisheries
- In office 27 June 1986 – 17 June 1988
- President: Alan García
- Prime Minister: Luis Alva Castro; Guillermo Larco Cox; Armando Villanueva
- Preceded by: José Palomino Roedel
- Succeeded by: Rómulo León Alegría

Member of the Chamber of Deputies
- In office 26 July 1980 – 26 July 1990
- Constituency: El Callao
- In office 28 July 1963 – 3 October 1968
- Constituency: El Callao

Personal details
- Born: Javier Augusto Labarthe Correa; 3 July 1924 Salaverry, Trujillo, Peru
- Died: 8 November 2001 (aged 77) Lima, Peru
- Party: Peruvian Aprista Party
- Spouse: Leticia Fernandini Rosas
- Children: Javier Labarthe Fernandini
- Education: Peruvian Naval School; Federico Villarreal National University
- Occupation: Naval officer; businessman

Javier Augusto Labarthe Correa (3 July 1924 – 8 November 2001) was a Peruvian naval officer, businessman, and politician. He served as Minister of Fisheries from 1986 to 1988 during the first presidency of Alan García. Over the course of his career, he held positions in the Peruvian Navy, the fishing industry, and in national politics as a congressman representing El Callao.

== Early life and education ==
Labarthe Correa was born to Rear Admiral Enrique Labarthe Durand and María Rosa Correa Santisteban. He was the grandson of politician Pedro Labarthe Effio and a descendant of Estanislao Correa y Garay. He attended the Colegio de La Inmaculada and the Colegio Maristas before entering the Peruvian Naval Academy in 1937. He graduated in 1944 as an ensign. After completing his naval service, he pursued studies in economics at the Federico Villarreal National University.

== Military career ==
Following his graduation from the Peruvian Naval School, Labarthe Correa served in the Peruvian Navy for seven years. In 1948, he was appointed head of the Talara Naval Garrison.

== Professional career ==
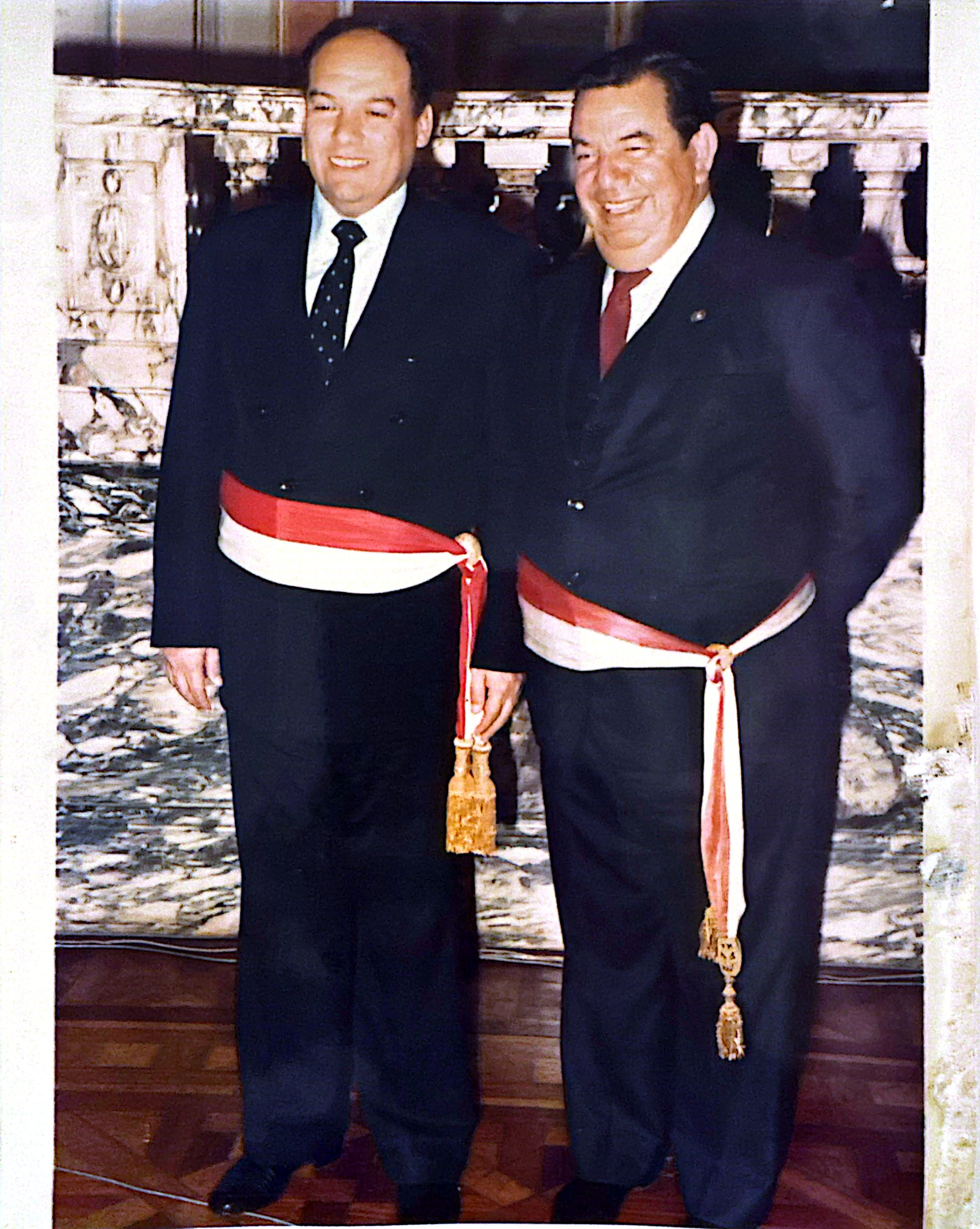
Prime Minister Luis Alva Castro and Labarthe in 1986.

In 1950, Labarthe Correa retired from the Navy and turned his attention to the fishing industry, in which he worked until 1967. He was the owner of the San Andrés Industries, a firm specializing in the shipment of fishmeal and fish oil. He also held leadership positions in the sector, serving as director of the National Fisheries Society and as vice president of the World Fisheries Committee of the Food and Agriculture Organization (FAO).

Between 1970 and 1980, Labarthe Correa worked at Inter-American Development Bank in Washington D.C. and Costa Rica in the fisheries division, heading the Fishing Projects in Central America.

== Political career ==
In the 1963 general elections, Labarthe Correa was elected to the Chamber of Deputies for El Callao as a member of the Odriist National Union (UNO). He held office until 1968, when a coup d'état established the Revolutionary Government of the Armed Forces of Peru and dissolved the legislature.

He returned to Congress in the 1980 general elections, this time under the Peruvian Aprista Party. He was re-elected in the 1985 general election with 9,832 preferential votes. As a member of the lower chamber, he chaired the Committee on Budget, and promoted the creation of the Bank of the Nation, which represents the Peruvian government in financial transactions in both the public and private sectors, as well as at both domestic and international levels.

In July 1986, he was appointed Minister of Fisheries by President Alan García. He served in this role until June 1988.

== Electoral history ==
Election	Office	List	#	District	Votes			Result	Ref.
Election	Office	List	#	District	Total	%	P.	Result	Ref.
1963	Member of the Chamber of Deputies	Odriist National Union	1	El Callao	30,048	38.97%	1st (Note: Presented on an electoral list. The data shown represents the share of the vote the entire party/alliance received in that constituency.)	Elected	
1980	Member of the Chamber of Deputies	Peruvian Aprista Party	2	El Callao	45,077	28.91%	2nd	Elected	
1985	Member of the Chamber of Deputies	Peruvian Aprista Party	1	El Callao	9,832	58.16%	1st	Elected	

== See also ==
- Peruvian Navy
- Peruvian Aprista Party
- Ministry of Production (Peru)
- Alan García
- Luis Negreiros
