= Luis Gonzales Posada =

Peruvian lawyer and politician

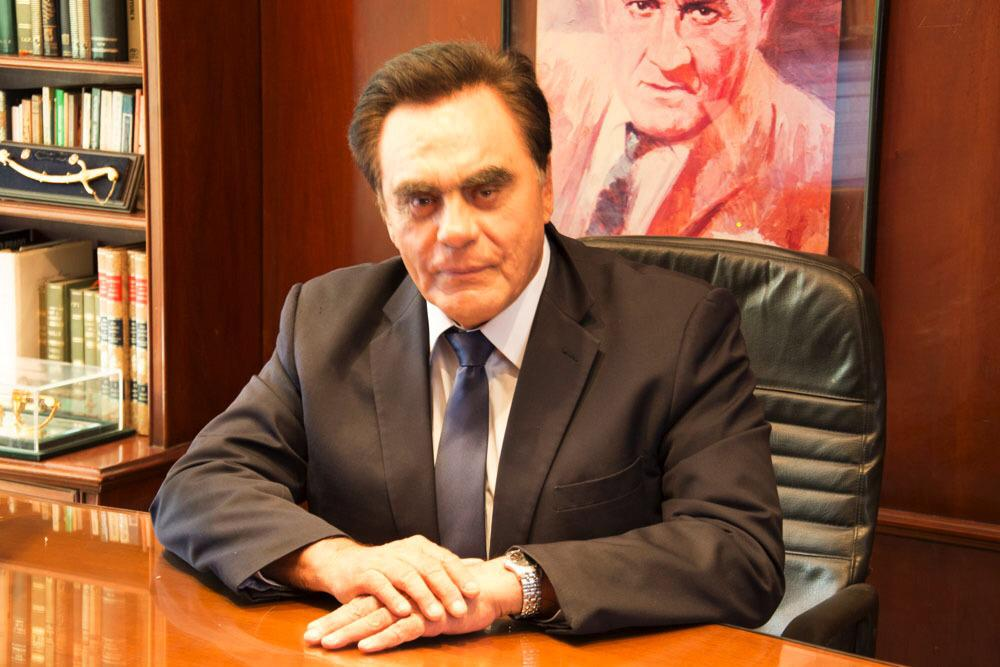

President of Congress
- In office 26 July 2007 – 26 July 2008
- Preceded by: Mercedes Cabanillas
- Succeeded by: Javier Velásquez

Member of Congress
- In office 26 July 2001 – 26 July 2011
- Constituency: Ica

Minister of Foreign Relations
- In office 13 May 1988 – 1 March 1989
- President: Alan García
- Prime Minister: Armando Villanueva
- Preceded by: Allan Wagner Tizón
- Succeeded by: Guillermo Larco Cox

Minister of Justice
- In office 28 July 1985 – 27 June 1986
- President: Alan García
- Prime Minister: Luis Alva Castro
- Preceded by: Alberto Musso Vento
- Succeeded by: Carlos Blancas Bustamante

Personal details
- Born: Luis Javier Gonzales Posada Eyzaguirre; 30 July 1945 (age 81) Ica, Peru
- Party: Peruvian Aprista Party
- Spouse: María Luisa de Cossio de Vivanco
- Education: National University of San Marcos
- Website: Official Site

Luis Javier Gonzales Posada Eyzaguirre (born 30 July 1945) is a Peruvian lawyer and politician, belonging to the Peruvian Aprista Party. He was a Congressman representing Ica Region for the period 2006–2011, and belongs to the Peruvian Aprista Party. He was President of Congress from 2007 to 2008. During the first presidency of Alan García, he was the Minister of Justice from 1985 to 1986 and then as Foreign Affairs Minister from 1988 to 1989.

== Biography ==
He was born on July 30, 1945, in the Province of Pisco, Department of Ica, son of the lawyer and Aprista leader, Carlos Gonzales Posada and Zully Eyzaguirre.

His father participated in the student revolt of May 23, 1923. He was imprisoned and persecuted for his political ideas. He held the position of General Manager of the Social Workers' Insurance and the laws that created family insurance and the incorporation into the field of social security of work accidents and occupational diseases were his initiatives.

He studied at the Claretian College and the Leoncio Prado Military College. He entered the Faculties of Letters and Law of the Universidad Nacional Mayor de San Marcos. He was elected representative to the student third. He obtained a bachelor's degree supporting a thesis on the 200 Miles of Territorial Sea, and the title of lawyer.

His sister was Consuelo Gonzales Posada, wife of General Juan Velasco Alvarado and first lady of Peru.

His sister, Deputy Bertha Gonzales Posada, is known for her parliamentary work. She was the creator of the Commissioner for Women and author of Law 24975 that allows women to access the School of Officers of the National Police; of Law 24705 that recognizes housewives and / or mothers of families as independent workers, incorporating them into the health and social security pension system and of Law 25143 that provides for the breastfeeding allowance for women.

In 1972, Luis Gonzales Posada married Marilú de Cossío de Vivanco, daughter of Ambassador José Luis de Cossío y Ruiz de Somocurcio. His wife Marilú carries out social work through the Mundo Libre Institute, whose presidency he holds, rehabilitating hundreds of street children from drug use. This performance has earned him the International Award from the Pan American Development Foundation in Washington DC, the United Nations - Vienna Award for Civil Society 2001, the Medal of the City of Lima and the decoration of the Congress of Peru. The couple have three children, Ananú, Javier and Diego Gonzales Posada de Cossío.

== Political career ==
On July 28, 1985, he was appointed Minister of Justice, in the first cabinet of President Alan García, position in which he held until 1986.

From 1986 to 1988 he served as Permanent Representative of Peru to the Organization of American States (OAS).

In 1988 he was appointed Minister of Foreign Affairs, a position he held until March 1989.

After completing the first Government of the APRA, the OAS Secretary General appointed him director of the office in Venezuela.

In 1992 he was publicly protested by the autogolpe in his country. The de facto government of Peru requested the cessation of the position and he was separated from the post. He is the first official of the OAS ceased to defend the democratic system.

When he returned to Lima, the illustrious Lima Bar Association appointed him president of the Foreign Affairs Commission, a position he exercised for five consecutive years. His work defending the Peruvian position in the conflict with Ecuador, publishing a historical-legal opinion on that subject was vastly acknowledged. Consequently, years later, he was given the highest decoration of the guild, "Vicente Morales Duárez".

=== Congressman ===
He postulated Congress in the general elections of 2001 by the Aprista party.

He was president of the Foreign Affairs Commission (2001–2002) and as such promoted the accession of Peru to the International Criminal Court as well as bills for the reincorporation of the diplomats dismissed in the Government of Alberto Fujimori, the Law of the political asylum and the shelter law.

The project promoted by Gonzáles Posada (Law 27550) allowed the reincorporation of the members of the Diplomatic Service of Peru separated by the 1992 State Autogolpe. In the same way, Law 28805 served to reincorporate members of the Armed Forces and National police separated by political considerations.

In the general elections of 2006, he was re-elected, representing the Ica Department.

In the period 2006-2007 he was president of the National Defense Commission, Internal Order, Alternative Development and Fight against Congress Drugs.

On July 26, 2007, he was elected president of Congress, defeating Javier Bedoya of the National Unity. In the exercise of the presidency of Congress he deployed an intense action of support for the victims of the Southern Earthquake and achieved that all laws to support that region will be approved immediately and unanimously. Among other contributions, he stands out for national campaign to operate free of charge 1,500 poor people, thanks to the support of donors and physicians ophthalmologists, a campaign that was called "see to believe". He also managed to donate 1,500 wheelchairs and managed the delivery of 484 modules and homes for poor people. Likewise, he promoted a collection to move the affected departments hundreds of tons of food, clothing and water. He introduced sign language on the Congress Channel, an electric ramp for the discharge of the handicapped and managed the construction of the first educational center for 300 deaf children who bears the name of "Ludwig van Beethoven". In the exercise of the position, he managed to arrange with all the benches to support the demand on maritime limits of Peru against Chile in the International Court of Justice, experience that he narrates in his book "The Hague, Historical Decision".

In the period 2008-2009 he was a member of the Foreign Affairs Commissions and the Foreign Trade and Tourism.

According to the official report of the General Parliamentary Management, in the period 2006-2011 he held the first place among the 120 legislators as the author of projects that became legal norms.

He has given him the Gold Medal of the Diplomatic Service and later honored him as professor emeritus of the Diplomatic Academy of Peru, for having been the author of Law 28598 that empowers that center of study to grant titles on behalf of the nation.

The armed forces have given him the highest decorations and the same the national police, who also distinguished him with the police heart. San Luis Gonzaga University of Ica distinguished him as Doctor Honoris Causa.

As its initiatives, the Law 28740, of Political Asylum, considered the greatest international advance on the subject. He promoted the approval of the Law of Refuge 27891 and the adhesion of Peru to the International Criminal Court.

Other rules of the initiative of it were Law 29031 that instituted the day of the Democracy Defenders and the corresponding decoration to those who distinguish themselves in the fight against terrorism; Law 29487 granting free health benefits to the personnel with disabilities of the armed forces and their direct relatives; Law 29517 that prohibits tobacco consumption in public places.
