= Rodolfo Beltrán Bravo =

Peruvian politician

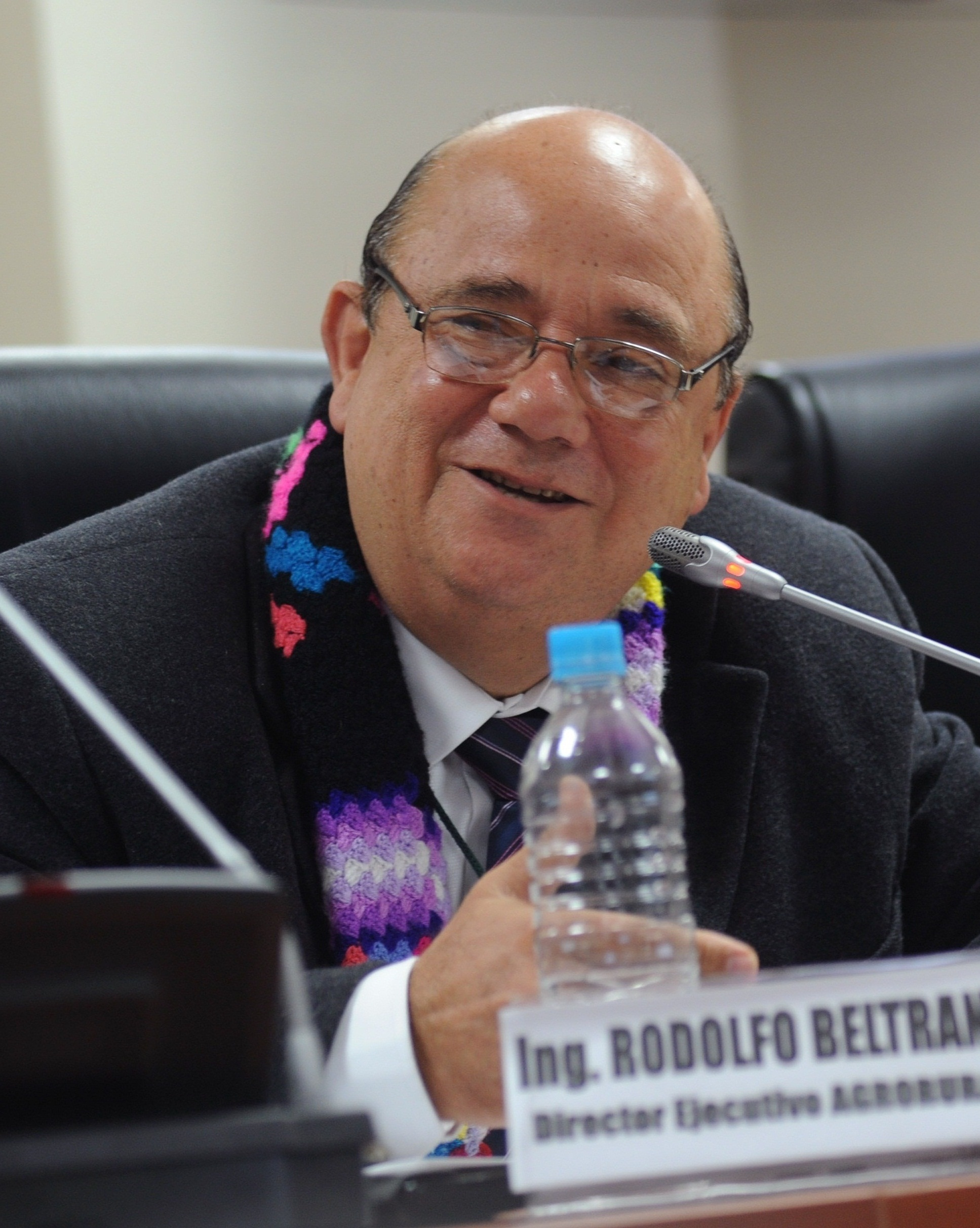

Minister of the Presidency
- In office 30 September 1989 – 24 July 1990
- President: Alan García
- Prime Minister: Guillermo Larco Cox
- Preceded by: Luis Alberto Sánchez
- Succeeded by: Office abolished

Personal details
- Born: 14 August 1948 (age 78) Lima, Peru
- Party: Independent
- Education: Texas A&M University (BS, MS)
- Occupation: Architect; Public administrator

Rodolfo Beltrán Bravo (born August 14, 1948) is a Peruvian architect and public administrator who served as Minister of the Presidency of Peru from 1989 to 1990, during the latter part of Alan García's first administration.

Member of the Board of the Central Reserve Bank of Peru (1989), CEO of the Institute of Foreign Commerce ICE (1989), Commercial Attaché of Peru in Venezuela and the Caribbean (1987–1989), Vice President of the Agrarian Bank (Agrobanco) (2008–2011) and CEO of Pronamachcs-Agrorural, National Rural Development Program of the Ministry of Agriculture of Peru (2006 to 2011).

He wrote the book Four Years Closer to Heaven, which describes his experiences in poverty reduction and climate change mitigation in the Andes of Peru.

== Education and sports ==
Master of Architecture, Bachelor of Science in Architectural Construction, Distinguished Student and member of the Varsity Swimming Team and Cadet Corps at Texas A&M University. Member of the Tau Beta Pi Association.

SPORTS National Swimming Champion of Peru, 200 m Backstroke 1965, Southwest Conference NCCA Bronze Medalist 1967. South American Master Swimming Champion in 2004 and 2008.

== Career ==
Received the "Great Cross Cruzeiro do Sul" of Brazil and the Distinguished Services "Comendador" order of Peru.

Winner of the sixth "International Green Award" (2011)–Collaborative Initiative Category for his direction of the Agrorural 240 Million Trees Campaign. In 2011, the same campaign was 8th place on the Honor Roll of the United Nations Environmental Program (UNEP).

From 2013 to 2014 he was in charge of the project Adopt an Inca terrace (Adopta Un Anden), of APEGA, Society of Peruvian Gastronomy addressed to market access of National Rural Producers.

He is a founder-member of the National Institute of Moringa of Peru.

From October 2019 to the present, he is Director, Region South America of EARTHDAY.ORG www.earthday.org/history/
