= José Carlos Carrasco =

Peruvian lawyer and politician

José Carrasco
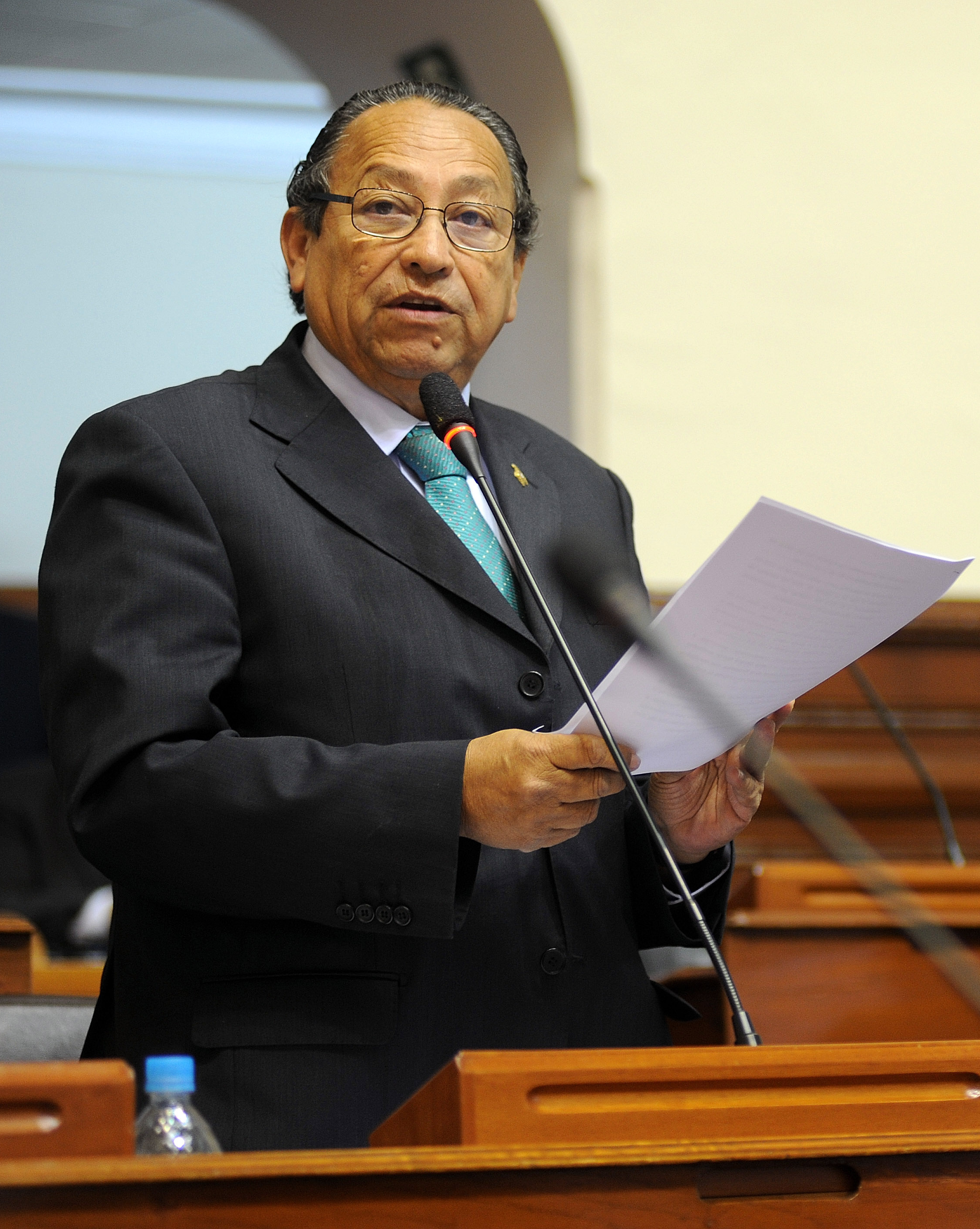
- Carrasco in 2010

Member of Congress
- In office 26 July 2001 – 26 July 2011
- Constituency: Piura

Minister of Energy and Mines
- In office 5 September 1988 – 15 May 1989
- President: Alan García
- Prime Minister: Armando Villanueva
- Preceded by: Abel Salinas
- Succeeded by: Mario Samamé Boggio

Member of the Chamber of Deputies
- In office 26 July 1980 – 5 April 1992
- Constituency: Piura

Personal details
- Born: José Carlos Carrasco Távara; 14 April 1944 Sullana, Peru
- Died: 16 January 2015 (aged 70) Lima, Peru
- Cause of death: Lung cancer
- Party: Peruvian Aprista Party
- Education: Universidad Nacional Federico Villarreal
- Occupation: Politician
- Profession: Lawyer

José Carlos Carrasco Távara (14 April 1944 – 16 January 2015) was a Peruvian lawyer and politician and a former Congressman representing the Piura region for the 2001–2006 term, and the 2006–2011 term. Carrasco belonged to the Peruvian Aprista Party. He was born in Sullana. He was the Minister of Energy and Mines during the First Presidency of Alan Garcia and was also a Deputy, representing the Piura region from 1980 to 1992, when President Alberto Fujimori shut the whole Congress down in a self-coup.

== Biography ==
He was born in the province of Sullana, on April 14, 1944.

He completed his school studies at the Colegio Santa Rosa de los Hermanos Maristas, in his hometown and his university studies at the Faculty of Law of the National University Federico Villarreal from 1965 to 1971, obtaining a Bachelor's Degree in Political Science and later graduating from attorney.

He was the Minister of Energy and Mines during the First Presidency of Alan Garcia and was also a Deputy, representing the Piura region from 1980 to 1992, when President Alberto Fujimori shut the whole Congress down in a self-coup. He returned to Congress, representing the Piura region for the 2001–2006 term, and the 2006–2011 term. He participated in the 2014 regional elections as a candidate for the presidency of the Regional Government of Piura for the "Obras + Obras Regional Movement" without obtaining the election, remaining in eighth place with only 2,347% of the votes.

== Death ==
He died in Lima on 16 January 2015 from lung cancer, at the age of 70.
