= Luciana León =

Peruvian politician (born 1978)

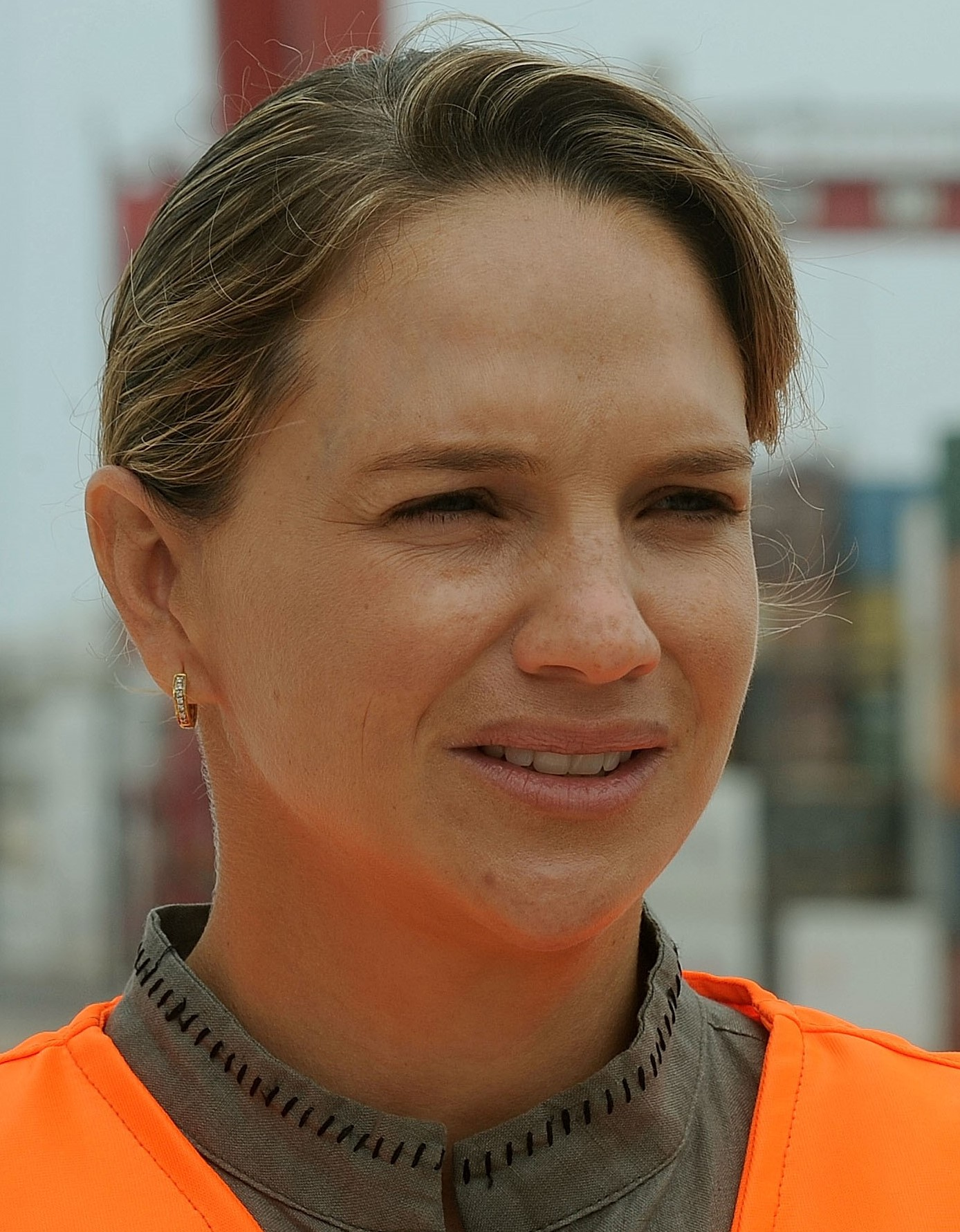

Member of Congress
- In office 26 July 2006 – 30 September 2019
- Constituency: Lima

Personal details
- Born: Luciana Milagros León Romero; 30 June 1978 (age 48) Lima, Peru
- Party: Peruvian Aprista Party
- Parent: Rómulo León Alegría
- Education: University of Lima (LLB); Universidad de San Martín de Porres (MPP)
- Occupation: Politician
- Profession: Lawyer
- Website: http://www.lucianaleonenaccion.com

Luciana Milagros León Romero (born 30 June 1978) is a Peruvian politician (APRA). She is the daughter of Rómulo León Alegría, a well known politician in Peru.

== Education ==
Luciana León holds a law degree from the University of Lima and a Master of Governance and Public Policy from the University of San Martín de Porres.

== Political career ==
In February 1993, at the age of 14, she became General Secretary of the Aprista Party's youth wing, serving until 1995. In 2002, she was an advisor to the Women's commission of the Congress, subsequently advisor to the Vice President of Congress, her mentor Mercedes Cabanillas until 2003. From 2004 to 2005, she was advisor to the general direction of the Ministry of Transportation and Communications. In 2006, León was elected Congresswoman representing Lima and being the youngest representative in the 2006–2011 term. In the 2011 election, she was re-elected for another five-year term as one of only four Aprista lawmakers left.

She testified during the investigation of the 2008 Peru oil scandal after her name came up in e-mails indicating she was involved in the scandal.

== Awards and recognition ==
She has been named #1 in an international Internet poll, run by Spain's 20 Minutos newspaper in 2009 to find the world's most beautiful female politician.

== See also ==
- Alan García
- 2008 Peru oil scandal
