= Presidency of Alan García =

Presidency of Alan García may refer to:

- First presidency of Alan García, the presidential administration of Peru from 1985 to 1990
- Second presidency of Alan García, the presidential administration of Peru from 2006 to 2011

== See also ==
- Alan García
