= Ministry of the Presidency (Peru) =

Government ministry of Peru

- Ministerio de la Presidencia

Agency overview
- Formed: 28 July 1985; 41 years ago
- Dissolved: July 12, 2002

The Ministry of the Presidency (Spanish: Ministerio de la Presidencia, MIPRE) was a government ministry of the Peruvian government. Created through Law N° 24297 on July 28, 1985, its function was to regulate and coordinate the operation of multisectoral entities and decentralized public organizations of the central government. It was deactivated in 2002.

== History ==
The ministry was created in 1985, during the first presidency of Alan García. Originally deactivated in 1990, it was again reactivated on May 10, 1992. Following the self-coup of Alberto Fujimori, the Ministry of the Presidency was recreated by Supreme Decree on 21 April 1992, with Jorge Lau Kong serving as its first holder. Among those who successively held the position during the Fujimori government were Jaime Yoshiyama, Manuel Vara Ochoa, Edgardo Mosqueira Medina and María Luisa Alvarado, who was the last minister of the Fujimori regime. According to La República, the ministry gained power within the government's corruption network. Under the government of Alberto Fujimori, it became the most powerful ministry in the country, with around 30% of the government's budget directed at its funding. It was deactivated again in 2002.

== Organisation ==
In 1992, the following agencies were attached to the ministry:

- Servicio de Agua Potable y Alcantarillado de Lima (SEDAPAL)
- Servicio Nacional de Agua Potable y Alcantarillado (SENAPA)
- Empresa Nacional de Edificaciones (ENACE)
- Fondo Nacional de Vivienda (FONAVI)
- Superintendencia de Bienes Nacionales (SBN)
- Banco de Materiales (BANMAT)
- Fondo Nacional de Compensación y Desarrollo Social (FONCODES)
- Instituto Nacional de Bienestar Familiar (INABIF)
- Oficina Nacional de Cooperación Popular (COOPOP)
- Instituto Nacional de Fomento Municipal (INFOM)
- Corporación de Desarrollo Departamental de Lima y Callao (CORDELICA)
- Instituto Nacional de Infraestructura Educativa y de Salud (INFES)
- Programa Nacional de Asistencia Alimentaria (PRONAA)

== List of ministers ==
Name	Party	Period	
Name	Party	Term start	Term end
Nicanor Mujica Álvarez-Calderón	APRA	July 28, 1985	June 27, 1987
Guillermo Larco Cox	APRA	June 27, 1987	May 13, 1988
Armando Villanueva del Campo	APRA	May 13, 1988	March 1, 1989
Agustín Mantilla Campos	APRA	March 1, 1989	May 15, 1989
Luis Alberto Sánchez	APRA	May 15, 1989	September 30, 1989
Rodolfo Beltrán Bravo	—N/a	September 30, 1989	July 24, 1990
Jorge Lau Kong	Cambio 90	April 21, 1992	October 2, 1992
Manuel Vara Ochoa	Cambio 90	October 2, 1992	February 17, 1994
Raúl Vittor Alfaro	Cambio 90	February 17, 1994	August 6, 1994
María Luisa Federici	—N/a	August 6, 1994	July 28, 1995
Manuel Vara Ochoa	Cambio 90	July 28, 1995	November 15, 1995
Jaime Yoshiyama Tanaka	Nueva Mayoría	November 15, 1995	September 13, 1997
Daniel Hokama Tokashiki	Cambio 90–Nueva Mayoría	September 13, 1997	December 31, 1997
Tomás Gonzales Reátegui	Cambio 90–Nueva Mayoría	December 31, 1997	January 6, 1999
Cristina Rizo Patrón Velarde	—N/a	January 6, 1999	April 16, 1999
Edgardo Mosqueira Medina	Cambio 90–Nueva Mayoría	October 13, 1999	August 3, 2000
María Luisa Alvarado Barrantes	Peru 2000	August 3, 2000	November 25, 2000
Juan Incháustegui Vargas	Acción Popular	November 22, 2000	January 18, 2001
Emilio Navarro Castañeda	—N/a	January 18, 2001	July 28, 2001
Carlos Bruce Montes de Oca	Perú Posible	July 28, 2001	July 12, 2002

== See also ==
- Government of Peru
