= Orestes Rodríguez =

Orestes Rodríguez may refer to:

- Orestes Rodríguez Williams, Cuban runner
- Orestes Rodríguez Vargas, Spanish-Peruvian chess player
- Orestes Rodríguez Campos, Peruvian politician
