= Juan Carlos Hurtado Miller =

Peruvian former engineer and Fujimorist politician

Prime Minister of Peru
- In office 28 July 1990 – 15 February 1991
- President: Alberto Fujimori
- Preceded by: Guillermo Larco Cox
- Succeeded by: Carlos Torres y Torres Lara

Minister of Economy and Finance
- In office 28 July 1990 – 15 February 1991
- President: Alberto Fujimori
- Prime Minister: Himself
- Preceded by: César Vásquez Bazán
- Succeeded by: Carlos Boloña Behr

Minister of Industry, Tourism, Integration and International Trade Negotiations
- In office 13 October 1999 – 28 July 2000
- President: Alberto Fujimori
- Prime Minister: Alberto Bustamante Belaúnde
- Preceded by: Gustavo Caillaux Zazzali
- Succeeded by: Gonzalo Romero de la Puente

Minister of Agriculture
- In office 3 August 1983 – 28 July 1985
- President: Fernando Belaúnde Terry
- Prime Minister: Fernando Schwalb López-Aldana; Sandro Mariátegui Chiappe; Luis Pércovich Roca
- Preceded by: Mirko Cuculiza Torre
- Succeeded by: Augusto Barturén Dueñas

Personal details
- Born: Juan Carlos Hurtado Miller; 16 November 1940 (age 85) Lima, Peru
- Party: Cambio 90; New Majority; Vamos Vecino
- Other political affiliations: Popular Action (until 1990)
- Education: National Agrarian University La Molina

Juan Carlos Hurtado Miller (born 16 November 1940) is a Peruvian former engineer and Fujimorist politician who served in the cabinet during the presidency of Fernando Belaúnde Terry and Alberto Fujimori in which, he served as Fujimori's first Prime Minister of Peru from 1990 to 1991 and was the Minister of Agriculture during the presidency of Fernando Belaúnde Terry between 1983 and 1985.

== Early life and education ==
Juan Carlos Hurtado was born on 16 November 1940 in Lima. His parents were former Minister of Health Alberto Hurtado Abadía and Lily Miller Maertens. He is the first cousin of former First Lady Violeta Correa Miller, wife of President Fernando Belaúnde Terry and daughter of former Foreign Minister Javier Correa Elías as well as a relative of Augusto Blacker Miller.

He completed his school studies at the Colegio Sagrados Corazones Recoleta.

He entered the National Agrarian University La Molina, where he studied agricultural engineering. He received a master's degree in Agricultural Economics at the University of Iowa. He also received a master's degree in public administration at the John F. Kennedy School of Government at Harvard University. He was an assistant researcher at the Harvard Institute for International Development.

He was coordinator of the Fondo de Financiamiento de Estudios de Proyectos de Inversión (FINEPI).

He married Leonor de Asín Puyo.

== Political career ==
He worked as an agricultural programmer for the National Planning Institute.

In the Second Government of President Fernando Belaúnde Terry he was chairman of the board of the Banco Agrario del Perú, director of the Central Reserve Bank of Peru, president of the Corporación Financiera de Desarrollo (COFIDE).

He was a member of the board of directors of Banco Industrial del Perú.

On 4 August 1983, he was appointed Minister of Agriculture by President Fernando Belaúnde Terry. During his tenure as minister, the creation of CERTEX for non-traditional exports was approved. He remained in office until the end of the government in 1985.

On 28 July 1990, newly elected President Alberto Fujimori appointed him as Prime Minister of Peru and also at the same time as Minister of Economy and Finance.

As minister he was in charge of the announcement of the "Fujishock", a measure that proposed a restructuring of prices to control inflation. He resigned from office in February 1991 following the publication of an alternative economic stabilization program, the continuing failure to fight inflation and the crisis caused by a cholera epidemic.

He ran for mayor of Lima in the 1998 local elections under the Vamos Vecino party, losing to Alberto Andrade, who was re-elected for a second term.

On 13 October 1999, he returned to the Fujimori government as Minister of Industry, Tourism, Integration and International Trade Negotiations. He remained in the ministry until 28 July 2000.

He was accused of receiving funds for his electoral campaign from Intelligence chief Vladimiro Montesinos, for which he went into hiding in 2000. The delivery of these funds is documented in vladi-videos secretly filmed by Vladimiro Montesinos. Surprisingly, he was handed over to justice on 13 April 2011.

Political offices
Preceded by Guillermo Larco Cox	Prime Minister of Peru; 1990–1991	Succeeded by Carlos Torres y Torres Lara
