= Olcese =

Olcese is a surname of Italian origin. It may refer to:

- Aldo Olcese (born 1974), Peruvian footballer, midfielder for Deportivo Municipal
- Andrea Olcese (born 1963), Italian radio and television showrunner
- Emiliano Olcese (born 1983), Argentinian footballer, forward for SP La Fiorita
- Luis Alberto Olcese (born 1981), Peruvian sailor in 2000 Summer Olympics
- Orlando Olcese, Peruvian scientist, rector of National Agrarian University from 1966 to 1968
