= Agustín Mantilla =

Peruvian politician (1944–2015)

Member of Congress
- In office 26 July 1995 – 26 July 2000
- Constituency: National

General Secretary of the Peruvian Aprista Party
- In office 23 December 1992 – May 1995
- Preceded by: Alan García
- Succeeded by: Luis Alva Castro

Minister of the Interior
- In office 15 May 1989 – 28 July 1990
- President: Alan García
- Prime Minister: Luis Alberto Sánchez; Guillermo Larco Cox
- Preceded by: Armando Villanueva
- Succeeded by: Adolfo Alvarado Fournier

Minister of the Presidency
- In office 2 March 1989 – 15 May 1989
- President: Alan García
- Prime Minister: Armando Villanueva
- Preceded by: Armando Villanueva
- Succeeded by: Luis Alberto Sánchez

Member of the Pueblo Libre District Council
- In office 1 January 1981 – 31 December 1983

Personal details
- Born: Máximo Agustín Mantilla Campos; 10 December 1944 Lima, Peru
- Died: 20 November 2015 (aged 70) Lima, Peru
- Party: Peruvian Aprista Party (until 2001)
- Education: National University of San Marcos (BA); Inca Garcilaso de la Vega University; ESAN University (MBA)
- Occupation: Politician
- Profession: Economist

Agustin Mantilla
- Born: Máximo Agustín Mantilla Campos; 10 December 1944; Lima, Peru
- Died: 20 November 2015 (aged 70); Lima, Peru
- Status: Served prison sentence, released in 2006
- Conviction: Bribery
- Criminal charges: Bribery
- Penalty: 6 years imprisonment

Máximo Agustín Mantilla Campos (December 10, 1944 – November 20, 2015) was a Peruvian economist, sociologist and politician. Considered by analysts as one of the most powerful political figures in Alan García's first administration, he served as Deputy Minister and subsequently as Minister of the Interior during the most tense years of the Peruvian internal conflict between the Peruvian government and the terrorist organizations, the Shining Path and the Túpac Amaru Revolutionary Movement.

Accused of leading a paramilitary death squad organization in the late 1980s, he denied the existence and his involvement in the organization throughout his career until 2013, where he admitted to the execution of suspected terrorists. He was sentenced to six years in prison based on charges of corruption as he was caught on videotape receiving bribes in one of Vladimiro Montesinos secret video recordings at the National Intelligence Service headquarters, in exchange for the Peruvian Aprista Party's support of President Alberto Fujimori's administration in 2000.

== Early life and education ==
Mantilla was born in Lima on December 10, 1944. Upon finishing high school, he joined the Peruvian Aprista Party in October 1965, and from early on he was strongly linked with the party base of the Pueblo Libre District. He was admitted to the National University of San Marcos in 1965, where he graduated with a degree in economics. Afterwards, he enrolled in the Inca Garcilaso de la Vega University, where he studied Sociology.

== Career ==
In 1970, he worked at the Fishing Consortium, in the fishmeal business; then in the fishmeal and fish oil trading company EPCHAP, and in Pescaperú.

== Political career ==
=== Early political career ===
Upon finishing high school, he enrolled in the Peruvian Aprista Party in October 1965, and from early on he was strongly linked with the party base of the Pueblo Libre District. Following his experience in the fishing sector, he was introduced to the inner circle of the Peruvian Aprista Party. Upon meeting Alan García in 1977, he served as his Private Secretary from 1979 to 1985.

From 1981 to 1983, he was a member of the District Council of Pueblo Libre. Between 1985 and 1989, he held the position of Deputy Minister of the Interior. He was briefly appointed Minister of the Presidency from March to May 1989, and as Interior Minister from May 1989 to July 1990.

During his tenure as Minister of the Interior, he was accused of leading the supposed paramilitary command "Rodrigo Franco", with the task of eliminating suspected terrorists. The organization has been classified as a government death squad authorized by Alan García's first administration, although no proof was found in the following investigations against Mantilla and the supposed Peruvian Army officials that were indicted members of the squad.

=== Congressman ===
In 1992, upon Alan García's request for political asylum granted by the Colombian government, Mantilla was chosen as his successor as Secretary General of the party, in December 1992. In his position as the highest ranking party leader at the 1995 Peruvian general election, Mantilla was elected to the newly unicameral Peruvian Congress alongside 7 other representatives of his party. He was succeeded in the Secretariat by former Second Vice President and 1990 presidential nominee, Luis Alva Castro. In the 2000 general election, Mantilla lost his seat as he attained a low number of votes.

== Trial, corruption charges and conviction ==
Following his congressional tenure and the 2000 general election, it was revealed to the media that Mantilla received US$30,000 from presidential advisor and Intelligence Chief Vladimiro Montesinos on March 13, 2000, destined for party funds in exchange for political support of Alberto Fujimori's regime. In 2002, the Supreme Court sentenced Mantilla to six years in prison for corruption charges in detriment of the Peruvian Government. Subsequently, he was expelled from the Peruvian Aprista Party.

Upon his release from prison in 2006, Mantilla kept a low profile in the years to come. Cited by investigative committees relating to the paramilitary command he was accused of leading, he kept denying his involvement and the existence of such organization until 2013, when he admitted the existence of the organization, but without the government's knowledge or consent.

== Death ==
Mantilla died on November 20, 2015, at his home in Pueblo Libre, due to diabetes at the age of 70.
