= List of ministries of Peru =

The following is a list of ministries of Peru. The government of Peru exercises its executive authority through a total of 18 government ministries and the office of President of the Council of Ministers.

== List ==
Ministry	Date of creation
Presidency of the Council of Ministers	December 1856
Agricultural Development and Irrigation	January 2, 1943
Culture	September 4, 2010
Defence	April 1, 1987
Development and Social Inclusion	October 20, 2011
Economy and Finance	August 3, 1821
Education	February 4, 1837
Energy and Mines	December 3, 1968
Environment	May 13, 2008
Foreign Affairs	August 3, 1821
Foreign Trade and Tourism	December 18, 2002
Health	October 5, 1935
Housing, Construction and Sanitation	July 11, 2002
Interior	April 30, 1873
Justice and Human Rights	June 1, 1826
Labour and Promotion of Employment	April 30, 1949
Production	June 17, 2005
Transport and Communications	March 25, 1969
Women and Vulnerable Populations	October 22, 1996

=== Former ===
Ministry	Date of creation	Date of dissolution
Aviation	October 27, 1941	April 1, 1987
Development and Public Works	January 22, 1896	April 1, 1969
Fishing	December 16, 1969	July 2002
Navy	October 13, 1920	April 1, 1987
Navy and Aviation	January 18, 1929	October 27, 1941
Presidency	July 28, 1985	July 12, 2002
Transport, Communications, Housing and Construction	May 11, 1992	July 10, 2002
War	October 13, 1920	April 1, 1987
War and Navy	August 3, 1821	October 13, 1920

== See also ==
- Cabinet of Peru
- Public Ministry of Peru
