= Raúl Diez Canseco =

Peruvian economist, entrepreneur and politician

Raúl Diez Canseco Terry
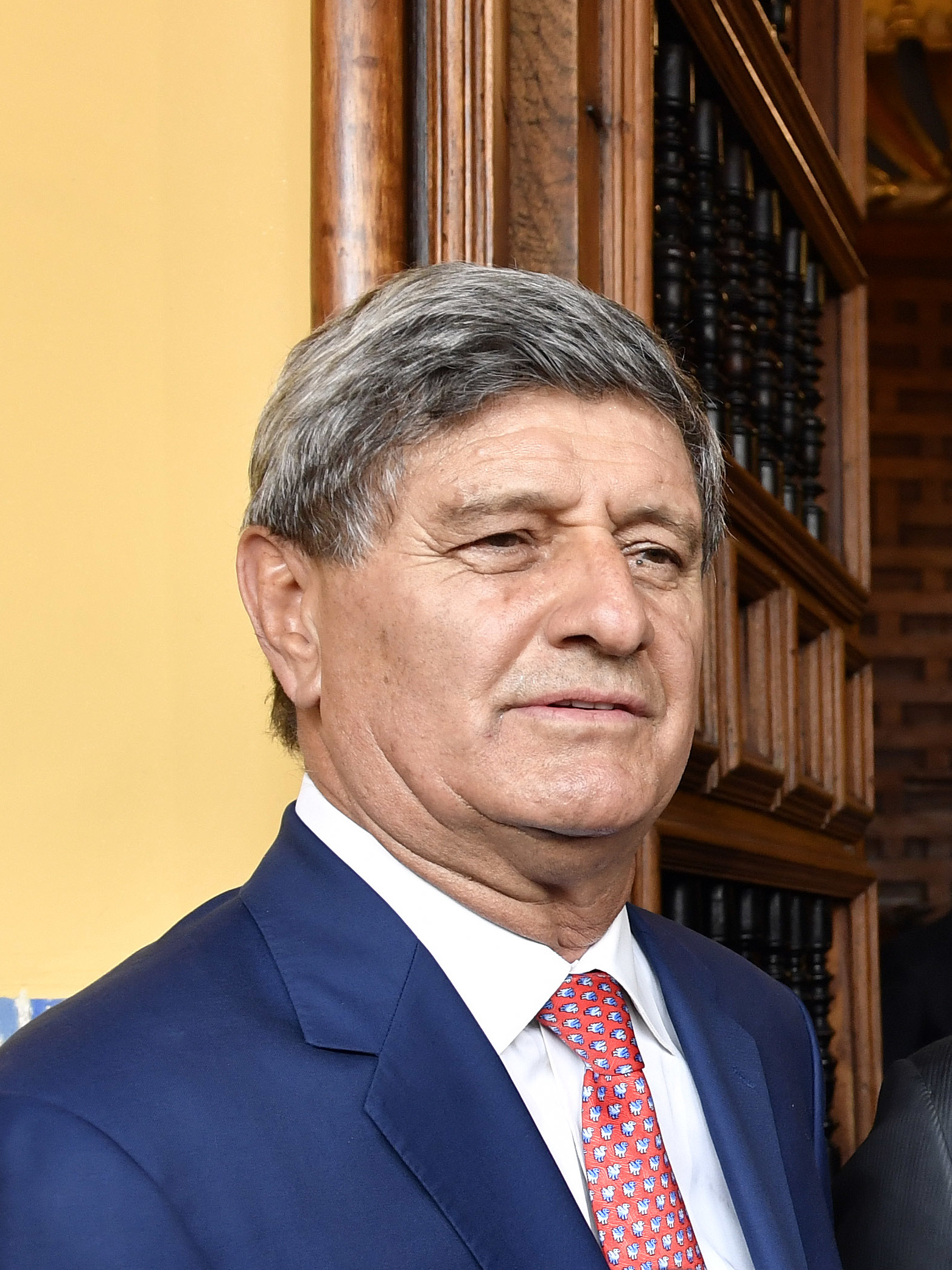

Founding President of the San Ignacio de Loyola Educational Corporation
- Incumbent
- Assumed office 7 December 1995

First Vice President of Peru
- In office 28 July 2001 – 14 December 2004
- President: Alejandro Toledo
- Preceded by: Francisco Tudela (2000)
- Succeeded by: Luis Giampietri (2006)

Minister of Foreign Trade and Tourism
- In office 12 July 2002 – 10 November 2003
- President: Alejandro Toledo
- Preceded by: Ministry created
- Succeeded by: Alfredo Ferrero

Minister of Industry, Tourism, Integration and International Trade Negotiations
- In office 28 July 2001 – 12 July 2002
- President: Alejandro Toledo
- Preceded by: Juan Incháustegui
- Succeeded by: Ministry deactivated

Member of the Chamber of Deputies
- In office 28 July 1990 – 5 April 1992
- Constituency: Lima

General Secretary of Acción Popular
- In office 1993–1995
- Preceded by: Fernando Calmell del Solar
- Succeeded by: Jorge Díaz León

Personal details
- Born: 23 January 1948 (age 78) Lima, Peru
- Party: Popular Action
- Other political affiliations: Possible Peru
- Education: Universidad del Pacífico
- Occupation: Economist, entrepreneur and politician
- Website: www.rauldiezcansecoterry.com

Raúl Diez Canseco Terry (born 23 January 1948) is a Peruvian economist, entrepreneur and politician. Currently, he is founder and president of San Ignacio de Loyola Educational Corporation and promoter of the solidarity campaign Respira Perú. Also, he was First Vice President of Peru (2001–2004) and Minister of Foreign Trade and Tourism of the government of Alejandro Toledo.

== Education ==
He studied elementary school at La Inmaculada School and high school at the Maristas School of San Isidro. In his youth, he worked in the construction of the Marginal de la Selva highway as a surveyor's assistant and completed his compulsory military service in 1966, in the Peruvian Navy. He subsequently obtained his BA in economics in 1972 at the Universidad del Pacífico (Peru).

== Entrepreneur ==
In 1968's, he founded San Ignacio de Loyola Pre-University Academy, which started what is today the San Ignacio de Loyola Educational Corporation, currently formed by the San Ignacio de Loyola University (USIL), USIL Graduate School, School of Chefs of USIL, Institute of Entrepreneurs, San Ignacio University in Miami, San Ignacio de Recalde (in Lima) and San Ignacio de Loyola (in Asunción, Paraguay) schools and Coloring Dreams Early Education Center in Lima and Miami.

He is regarded as the pioneer in Peru of the food franchise business. In the 1980s, he opened Kentucky Fried Chicken stores and continued with Pizza Hut, Burger King, Chili's, Mister Frog's and Brunswick Bowling-Cosmic entertainment chain. At present, Diez Canseco doesn't own shares in any of the franchises.

== Social work ==
Diez Canseco has been a member of organizations linked to social good such as the Peruvian Association for Regional and Urban Studies and the Common Good Works Association. He also participated in the construction and operation of the Family Kitchens, a pioneering program in Latin America, created by the former First Lady Violeta Correa de Belaunde to support people with limited economic resources in marginal areas of the country.

Also, he is founder and chairman of the board of the Asociación Pro Bienestar y Desarrollo (PROBIDE), the managing organization of the "Believe to Create" program aimed at disseminating business culture among young people, especially those with fewer economic resources who cannot access credit. of the country's financial entities.

The "Believe to Create" program has earned it, in 2000, an honorable mention of the "Excellence in Social Entrepreneurship" award organized by the Micro-Enterprise Unit of the Inter-American Development Bank (IDB).

Similarly, PROBIDE, in alliance with the Community of Madrid, has executed the project "Training of young people in the electronic sector" that has trained hundreds of young people from six districts of northern Lima free of charge, giving them the opportunity to not only have a trade also form their own micro-business.

Due to the COVID-19 pandemic and the lack of medicinal oxygen presented in Peru, Diez Canseco, through the San Ignacio de Loyola University, creates an alliance with National Society of Industries and Peruvian Episcopal Conference. In this way, Respira Peru solidarity campaign is formed, an initiative between the church, private companies and academia, whose purpose is to provide the country with necessary elements such as oxygen plants, mechanical fans, protective equipment, oxygenation centers, among other elements. Respira Peru had the contribution of the population and various companies.

To date, Respira Peru has inaugurated five oxygen plants in Arequipa, Loreto, Trujillo, Huánuco and Abancay. In addition, it has delivered oxygen cylinders, safety equipment, temporary mechanical ventilators, protective acrylic boxes and other items necessary to combat pandemic.

At the end of 2020, the campaign inaugurated two Temporary Oxygenation Attention Centers (CAT-O2) in Ate and Rimac districts of Lima, thanks to a joint effort with the Ministry of Health of Peru.

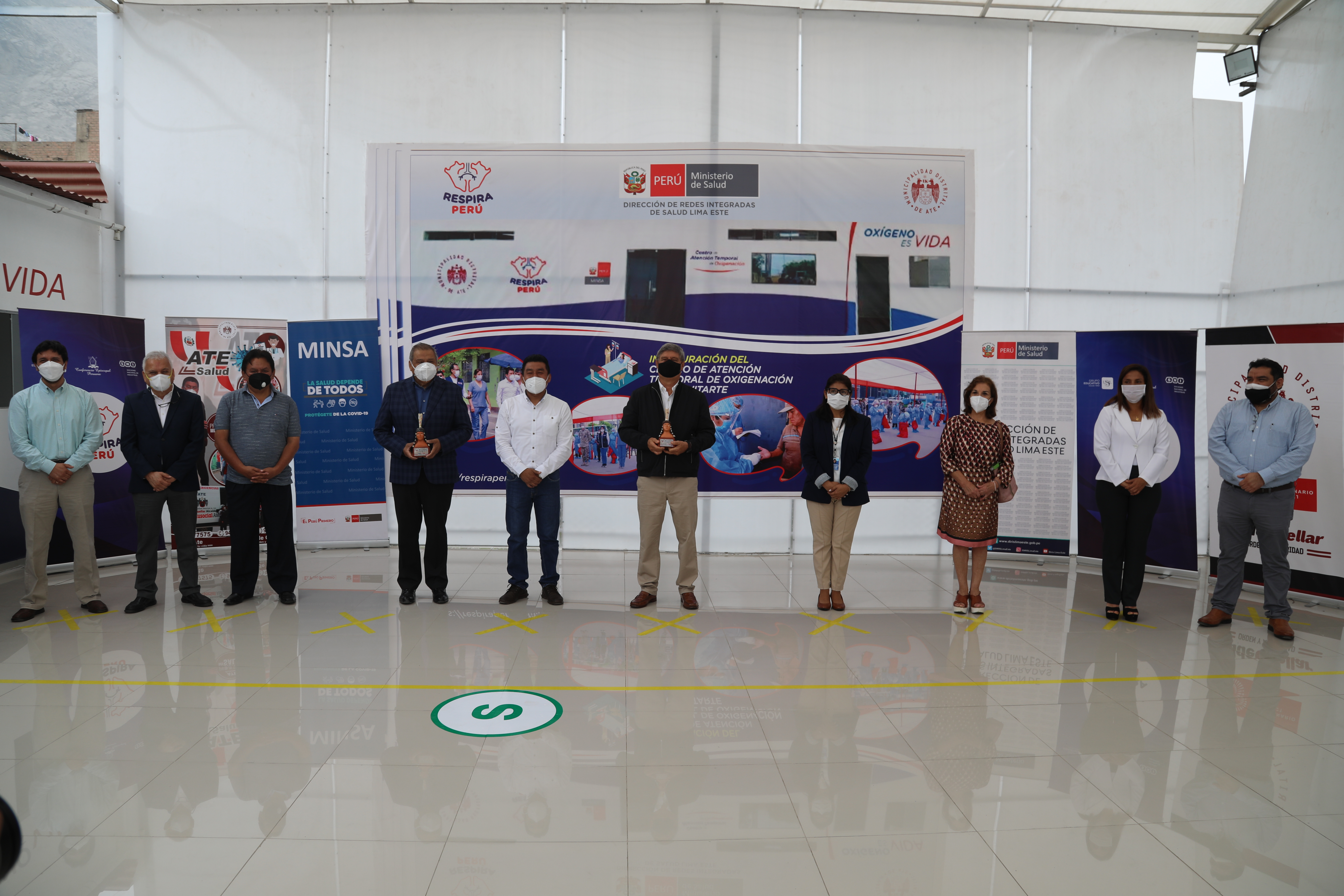
Respira Peru inaugurated a Temporary Oxygenation Attention Center in the Ate and Rimac districts of Lima

== Political trajectory ==
He was First Vice President of the Republic and also Minister of State in the portfolios of Foreign Trade and Tourism and of Industry, Tourism and International Trade Negotiations.

In 1990, he was elected deputy for Lima on the list of Democratic Front (FREDEMO) and held the position until 1992. As a deputy, he presided for two periods of the Industry, Commerce, Tourism and Integration Commission of Parliament.

Later, he participated in elections for mayor of Lima in 1993 and was a candidate for the presidency of the Republic in 1995, both times for the Popular Action (Peru) party but was unsuccessful.

== Recognitions ==
In 2015, Raúl Diez Canseco was distinguished with President's Global Leadership Award, granted by University of South Florida (USF) in recognition of his entrepreneurial career and his contributions to global education.

In 2013, founding president of USIL was distinguished as Doctor Honoris Causa by the Inter-American Open University of Buenos Aires, Argentina, by virtue of his leadership in entrepreneurial education and his business achievements.

In 2010, Raúl Diez Canseco received the Priyadarshni Awards in India, in recognition of his work in the fight against poverty through education and entrepreneurship. This award is awarded every two years to personalities from around the world for their contributions to humanity in different fields such as education, human rights, innovation, culture and development.

Similarly, in 2000, he received an honorable mention of the "Excellence in Social Entrepreneurship" award organized by the Micro-Enterprise Unit of the Inter-American Development Bank (IDB).
