= Juan Incháustegui =

Peruvian politician (1938–2019)

Minister of Industry, Tourism, Integration and International Commercial Negotiations
- In office 18 January 2001 – 28 July 2001
- President: Valentín Paniagua Corazao
- Prime Minister: Javier Pérez de Cuéllar
- Preceded by: Emilio Navarro Castañeda
- Succeeded by: Raúl Diez Canseco

Minister of the Presidency
- In office 22 November 2000 – 18 January 2001
- President: Valentín Paniagua Corazao
- Prime Minister: Javier Pérez de Cuéllar
- Preceded by: María Luisa Alvarado Barrantes
- Succeeded by: Emilio Navarro Castañeda

Member of the Senate
- In office 27 July 1990 – 5 April 1992
- Constituency: National

Minister of Energy and Mines
- In office 19 March 1984 – 28 July 1985
- President: Fernando Belaúnde
- Prime Minister: Luis Pércovich Roca
- Preceded by: José Benavides Muñoz
- Succeeded by: Wilfredo Huayta Núñez

Personal details
- Born: Juan Victoriano Incháustegui Vargas; 4 March 1938 Arequipa, Peru
- Died: 17 February 2019 (aged 80) Lima, Peru
- Party: Popular Action
- Education: National University of Engineering
- Occupation: Mechanical engineer, politician
- Awards: Order of the Sun of Peru

Juan Victoriano Incháustegui Vargas (4 March 1938 – 16 February 2019) was a Peruvian politician who served as Minister of Energy and Mines, Minister of Industry, Foreign Trade and Tourism and as a Senator.

== Biography ==
Born in Arequipa, studied Electrical Engineering at the National University of Engineering and participated in the High Direction program from the University of Piura. In the period from 1981 to 1984, he was General Manager of Electroperú S.A and in the nineties, he joined Cementos Pacasmayo as director. He was executive director and Vice President of TECSUP.

He was a member of the Board of Directors of the University of Engineering and Technology. He joined the Hochschild Group in 1986 and remained as director until January 2015. He was a member of the Board of Innóvate Peru Program of the Ministry of Production.

== Political career ==
In March 1984, President Fernando Belaúnde Terry appointed him Minister of Energy and Mines, position in which he remained until July 1985.

In the municipal elections of 1989, he applied to the Provincial Government of Lima for FREDEMO, being in second place with 26.79% of the votes.

He applied to the Senate in 1990 for FREDEMO, being elected with 87,451 votes. His parliamentary work was interrupted by the self-coup by Alberto Fujimori on 5 April 1992, which led to the dissolution of the Congress of the Republic.

For the general elections of 1995 he ran for First Vice President in the list headed by Raúl Diez Canseco; however, they only received 1.64% of the votes.

In November 2000, the temporary president, Valentín Paniagua, appointed him Minister of the Presidency. In January 2001, he resigned his post and was appointed Minister of Industry, Tourism, Integration and International Trade Negotiations, office in which he remained until July 2001.

== Award ==
He received the Order of the Sun in 1985.
