= Adopta Un Anden =

Adopta Un Anden is a project to add value and support existing rehabilitation and construction programs of andenes, Inca agricultural terraces in Peru. According to AGRORURAL from the Ministry of Agriculture and Irrigation, there are one million terraces from the Inca civilization, many of them built 1,500 years ago, but only 30% of them are available for use.

The project was created by APEGA President Bernardo Roca-Rey Miró Quesada and coordinated by Rodolfo Beltrán Bravo founder of ECOARKI. The Peruvian Gastronomic Society (APEGA) is positioned nationally and internationally with restaurants and food stores that regularly buy food and species for their gastronomy offer. The project coordinates with the Agricultural ministry of the Peruvian government, the Inter-American Development Bank (IDB), and private and academic institutions.
