= César Vásquez Bazán =

Peruvian politician and economist

César Alejandro Vásquez Bazán (born April 4, 1952) is an economist, graduate professor and Peruvian politician.

He studied at the Colegio San Andres de Lima and continued his education at the National University of San Marcos, where he graduated with a Bachelor of Arts in economics (1974) and economist (1975). He completed postgraduate courses in senior management of financial institutions at the Pontifical Catholic University of Peru (1980) and development, planning and public policy at the Latin American and Caribbean Institute for Economic and Social Planning in Chile (1986). At the University of Denver, he received a MA degree (1993) and a Ph.D. in international studies (2003).

His doctoral dissertation was on "Neoliberalism autocratic and Peruvian dilemma: The political economy of the decade of Fujimori" (2003). Other writings include "Response has written an outrage" (1991), "The forgotten proposal" (1987), "Demographic Trends, living conditions and population policy in Peru" (1987), "Hundred Days: basis for emergency economic plan" (1985) and "National Economic Congress" (1982).

In Peru, he was an associate professor of economics at the University of Lima and director of the Center for Economic and Social Research of the University. In the United States he taught at the Josef Korbel School of International Studies at the University College of the University of Denver.

His main professional interests are in the fields of economic and social policies, the Peruvian political economy and social and economic history of Peru.

Between May 15, 1989, and July 28, 1990, Vásquez was Minister of Economy and Finance of Peru during the last year of the First Government of Alan García.
