= Ministry of Foreign Trade and Tourism (Peru) =

Government ministry of Peru

- Ministerio de Comercio Exterior y Turismo
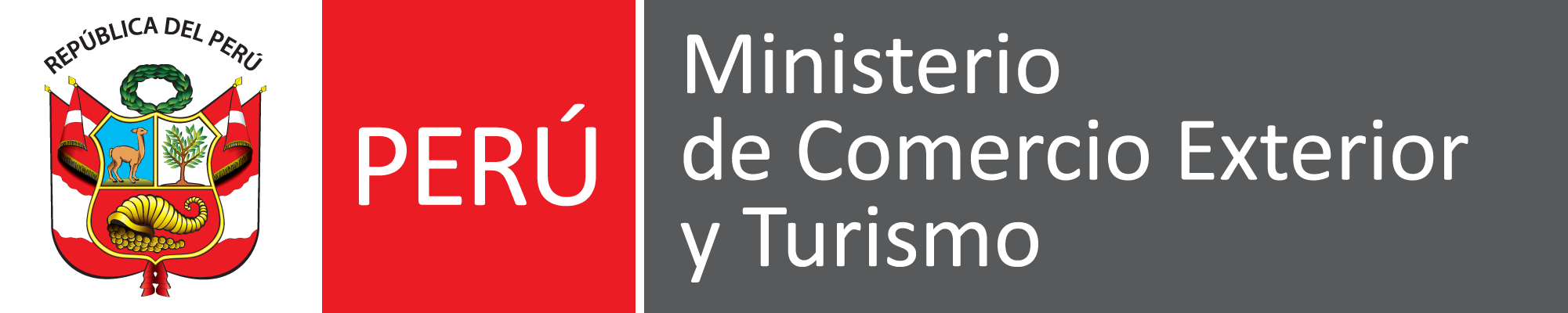

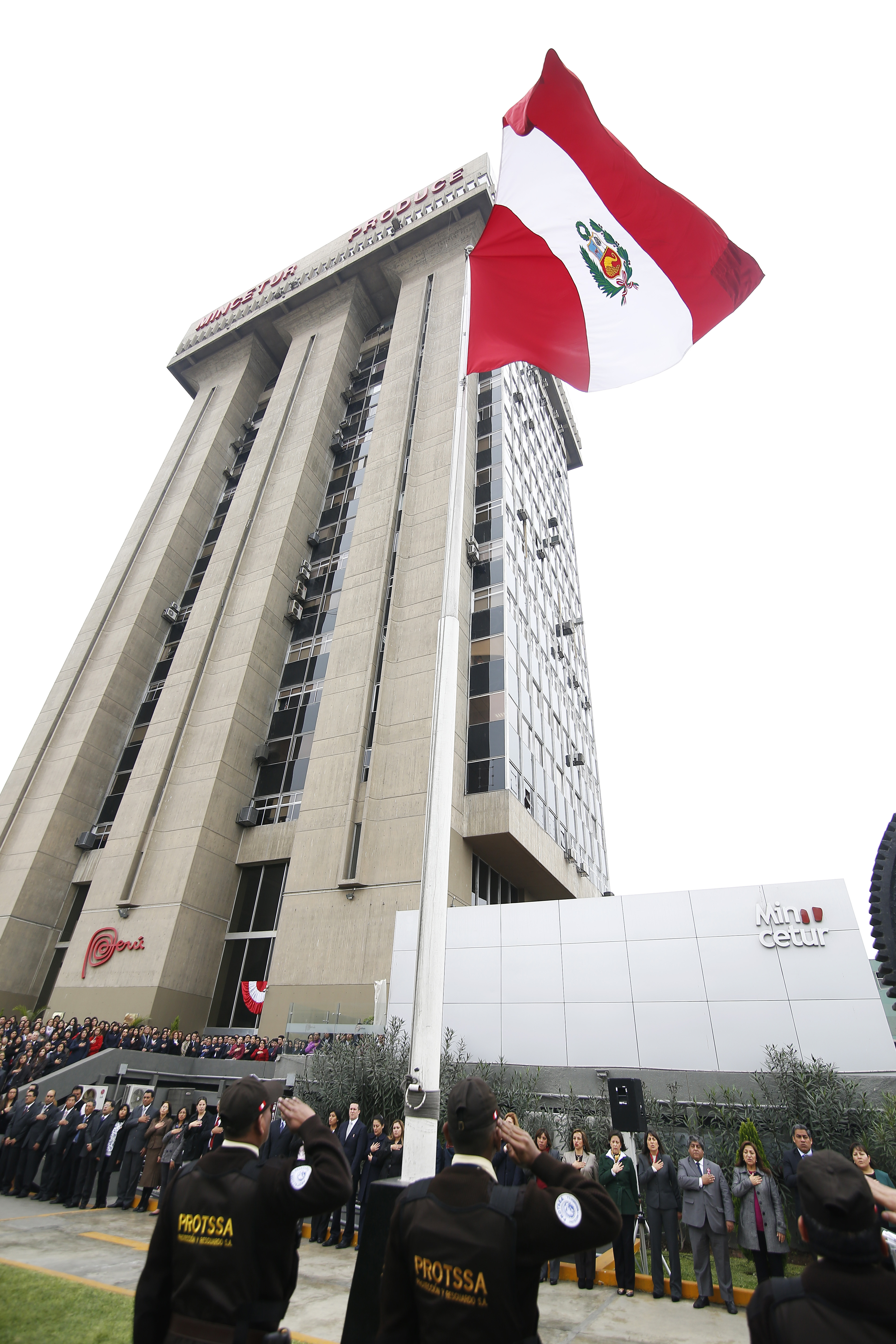

Agency overview
- Formed: 23 July 2002; 24 years ago
- Headquarters: 50 Uno Oeste, Corpac, San Isidro, Lima
- Minister responsible: José Reyes Llanos
- Website: www.gob.pe/mincetur

The Ministry of Foreign Trade and Tourism (Spanish: Ministerio de Comercio Exterior y Turismo, MINCETUR) of Peru is the government ministry in charge of issues pertaining to foreign trade of the Government of Peru and the promotion of tourism in the country.

As of 2026, the ministry is headed by José Reyes Llanos.

== History ==
The country was established in 1969 as the Ministry of Industry and Commerce (Spanish: Ministerio de Industria y Comercio), having been separated from the Ministry of Development and Public Works. The name remained until 1980, when it was renamed to Ministry of Industry, Commerce, Tourism and Integration (Spanish: Ministerio de Industria, Comercio, Turismo e Integración).

In 1992, it was renamed to Ministry of Industry, Tourism, Integration and International Trade Negotiations (Spanish: Ministerio de Industria, Turismo, Integración y Negociaciones Comerciales Internacionales, MITINCI), a name that remained until 2002, when it took its current name.

Throughout its history, the ministry has promoted free trade agreements and managed PromPerú, a government organisation responsible for promoting tourism to Peru around the world. The ministry has signed the following treaties:

- Canada-Peru Free Trade Agreement
- Chile-Peru Free Trade Agreement
- Thailand-Peru Free Trade Agreement
- United States-Peru Trade Promotion Agreement

== Organisation ==
- General Secretariat
- Vice Ministry of Tourism
  - Directorate-General of Research and Studies on Tourism and Handicrafts
  - Directorate-General of Development Policies
  - Directorate-General of Tourism Strategy
  - Directorate-General of Handicrafts
  - Directorate-General of Casino and Machine Games
- Vice Ministry of Foreign Trade
  - Directorate-General of Research and Studies on Foreign Trade
  - Directorate-General of Foreign Trade Development Policies
  - Directorate-General of Foreign Trade Facilitation
  - Directorate-General of Trade Negotiations
  - Directorate-General of International Trade Law
- Directorate of Management and Monitoring of the OCEX
- Peruvian Commercial Offices Abroad (OCEX)

Entities administered by the ministry include:

- Centro de Formación en Turismo (CENFOTUR)
- Comisión de Promoción del Perú para la Exportación y el Turismo (PROMPERU)
- Plan Copesco Nacional

== List of ministers ==
Name	Party	Period	
Name	Party	Term start	Term end
Ministers of Industry and Commerce (1969–1980)
Jorge Camino de la Torre	—	April 1, 1969	October 16, 1969
Jorge Dellepiane Ocampo	—	October 16, 1969	April 27, 1971
Alberto Jiménez de Lucio	—	April 27, 1971	August 29, 1975
Gastón Ibáñez O'Brien	—	August 29, 1975	May 15, 1978
Gabriel Lanatta Piaggio	—	May 15, 1978	September 16, 1978
Jorge Du Bois Gervasi	—	September 16, 1978	July 27, 1980
Ministers of Industry, Commerce, Tourism and Integration (1980–1992)
Roberto Rotondo	—	July 28, 1980	August 4, 1981
Roberto Persivale Serrano	—	August 4, 1981	August 4, 1982
Gonzalo de la Puente y Lavalle	—	August 4, 1982	August 4, 1983
Iván Rivera Flores	—	August 4, 1983	April 11, 1984
Álvaro Becerra Sotero	—	April 11, 1984	July 28, 1985
César Atala Nazzal	APRA	July 28, 1985	December 13, 1985
Manuel Romero Caro	—N/a	December 13, 1985	October 2, 1987
Alberto Vera La Rosa	APRA	October 2, 1987	May 13, 1988
Guillermo Artega Rashlton	—N/a	May 13, 1988	September 2, 1988
Juan García Cabrejos	APRA	September 2, 1988	March 1, 1989
Carlos Raffo Dasso	APRA	March 1, 1989	July 28, 1990
Guido Pennano Allison	—N/a	July 28, 1990	February 15, 1991
Ministers of Industry, Tourism, Integration and International Trade Negotiations (1992–2002)
Víctor Joy Way	Cambio 90	February 15, 1991	July 28, 1993
Alfonso Bustamante y Bustamante	—	July 28, 1993	February 17, 1994
Liliana Canale Novella	—	February 17, 1994	November 6, 1996
Gustavo Ernesto Caillaux Zazzali	—	November 6, 1996	October 13, 1999
Juan Carlos Hurtado Miller	Cambio 90–Nueva Mayoría	October 13, 1999	July 29, 2000
Gonzalo Romero de la Puente	Partido Popular Cristiano	July 29, 2000	November 22, 2000
Emilio Navarro Castañeda	—N/a	November 22, 2000	January 18, 2001
Juan Incháustegui Vargas	Acción Popular	January 18, 2001	July 28, 2001
Raúl Diez-Canseco Terry	Acción Popular	July 28, 2001	July 12, 2002
Ministers of Foreign Trade and Tourism
Raúl Diez-Canseco Terry	Acción Popular	July 12, 2002	November 10, 2003
Alfredo Ferrero Diez-Canseco	—N/a	November 10, 2003	July 28, 2006
Mercedes Aráoz Fernández	APRA	July 28, 2006	July 11, 2009
Martín Pérez Monteverde	Unidad Nacional	July 11, 2009	September 14, 2010
Eduardo Ferreyros Kuppers	—	September 14, 2010	July 28, 2011
José Silva Martinot	—	July 28, 2011	July 22, 2013
Magali Silva Velarde-Álvarez	—	July 22, 2013	July 28, 2016
Eduardo Ferreyros Kuppers	—	July 28, 2016; March 23, 2018	March 23, 2018; April 2, 2018
Rogers Valencia Espinoza	—	April 2, 2018	December 18, 2018
Edgar Vásquez Vela	—	December 18, 2018	July 15, 2020
Rocío Barrios Alvarado	—	July 15, 2020	November 10, 2020
María Seminario Marón	—	November 12, 2020	November 17, 2020
Claudia Cornejo Mohme	Partido Morado	November 18, 2020	July 28, 2021
Roberto Sánchez	—	July 29, 2021	December 7, 2022
Luis Fernando Helguero	—	December 10, 2022	April 23, 2023
Juan Carlos Mathews Salazar	—	April 23, 2023	April 1, 2024
Elizabeth Galdo Marín	Avanza País	April 1, 2024	September 3, 2024
Úrsula Desilú León	—N/a	September 3, 2024	October 12, 2025
Teresa Mera Gómez		October 14, 2025	February 24, 2026
José Reyes Llanos		February 24, 2026	Incumbent

== See also ==
- Tourism in Peru
