= Carlos Raffo Dasso =

Peruvian diplomat and politician (1927–2023)

Minister of Industry, Trade, Tourism, Integration, and International Trade Negotiations
- In office 1 March 1989 – 28 July 1990
- Preceded by: Juan García Cabrejos
- Succeeded by: Guido Pennano Allison

Ambassador of Peru to the United Kingdom
- In office 1986–1989
- Preceded by: Andrés Aramburú Menchaca
- Succeeded by: Felipe Valdivieso Belaúnde

Personal details
- Born: Carlos Alberto Raffo Dasso; 23 August 1927 Callao, Peru
- Died: 3 July 2023 (aged 95) Lima, Peru
- Party: PAP
- Education: National University of San Marcos; Pontifical Catholic University of Peru
- Occupation: Diplomat

Carlos Alberto Raffo Dasso (23 August 1927 – 3 July 2023) was a Peruvian diplomat and politician. A member of the Peruvian Aprista Party, he served as Ambassador of Peru to the United Kingdom from 1986 to 1989 and was Minister of Industry, Trade, Tourism, Integration, and International Trade Negotiations from 1989 to 1990.

Raffo died in Lima on 3 July 2023, at the age of 95.
