= University College of the University of Denver =

University College is the college of professional and continuing studies affiliated with the University of Denver, geared to the needs of working adults. It has been in operation since 1938 and has offered online education since 1996. University College offers graduate certificates and master's degrees, as well as bachelor's completion, in online and on campus formats. Professors at University College are generally adjuncts with experience teaching adults.

== University of Denver affiliation ==
The University of Denver (DU), founded in 1864, is the oldest private university in the Rocky Mountain Region. It is a coeducational, four-year university in Denver, Colorado. DU currently enrolls approximately 11,117 students, about equally divided between graduate and undergraduate programs. The 125-acre (0.51 km^{2}) main campus is a designated arboretum and is located primarily in the University Neighborhood, about seven miles (11 km) south of downtown Denver.
