= Eduardo Ferreyros Kuppers =

Peruvian politician (born 1959)

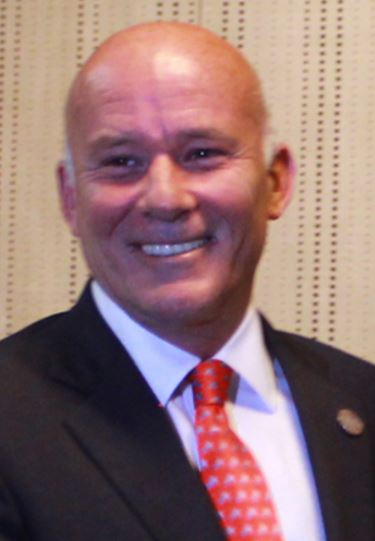
Ferreyros in 2016

Eduardo Ferreyros Kuppers (born 13 October 1959 in San Isidro, Lima, Peru) is the Peruvian Minister of Foreign Commerce and Tourism under President Pedro Pablo Kuczynski, from 28 July 2016 to 2 April 2018.

He was also Minister of Foreign Commerce and Tourism under President Alan García from 14 September 2010 until 28 July 2011.

== Biography ==
He is the son of Alejandro Ferreyros Diez Canseco (1926–1974) and Clara Josefina Rosa Küppers Vargas (b. 1928). He has 5 siblings: Alejandro José, Lilian Elena, María Cecilia Ferreyros, Javier Enríque and María Josefina Ferreyros Küppers.

He studied at the Santa María Marianistas School. He is licensed in Business Administration from the University of the Pacific (Peru). He is a specialist in foreign trade and international trade negotiations.
