= Rómulo León =

Peruvian politician (born 1946)

Rómulo León Alegría (born 7 October 1946) is a politician from Peru. He is a member of the APRA party. He has been imprisoned for his involvement in requesting bribes from foreign oil companies seeking to explore and drill in the Peruvian amazon rainforest. The company involved in this deal was Discover Petroleum International from Norway. The activities were discovered when audio tapes of Rómulo León negotiating the bribes were released to the press. He is the father of former Congresswoman Luciana León.

== Biography ==
Alegría was born on October 7, 1946, in Trujillo, the son of former deputy Rómulo León Ramírez and Yolanda Alegría.

He completed his school studies at the Colegio San José Obrero school in the city of Trujillo.

He studied Sociology at the Universidad Nacional Mayor de San Marcos; then he studied Regional Development Planning in London. He has a Master's Degree in Governance and Public Policies and a Doctorate in Governance from the Government Institute of the San Martín de Porres University.

He has been a professor at the Universidad Nacional Mayor de San Marcos, Universidad de Lima and at the Peruvian Institute of Business Administration (IPAE).

He was the founder of the newspaper Hoy, of which he has also been a member of the board.

He is the father of former Congresswoman Luciana León, from the same party, APRA.

== See also ==
- 2008 Peru oil scandal
- 2009 Peruvian political crisis
- Alan García

Preceded by Javier Labarthe Correa	Minister of Fishing; 1988-1989	Succeeded by Willy Harm Esparza
