= Luis Alberto Sánchez =

Prime Minister of Peru (1900–1994)

Luis Alberto Sánchez Sánchez

First Vice President of Peru
- In office 28 July 1985 – 28 July 1990
- President: Alan García
- Preceded by: Fernando Schwalb López Aldana
- Succeeded by: Máximo San Román

Prime Minister of Peru
- In office 15 May 1989 – 30 September 1989
- President: Alan García
- Preceded by: Armando Villanueva
- Succeeded by: Guillermo Larco Cox

Minister of the Presidency
- In office 15 May 1989 – 30 September 1989
- President: Alan García
- Preceded by: Agustín Mantilla
- Succeeded by: Rodolfo Beltrán Bravo

Member of the Senate
- In office 28 July 1963 – 28 July 1968
- Constituency: Lima
- In office 26 July 1980 – 5 April 1992

President of the Senate
- In office 28 July 1965 – 28 July 1966
- Preceded by: Ramiro Prialé
- Succeeded by: David Aguilar Cornejo
- In office 26 July 1985 – 26 July 1986
- Preceded by: Manuel Ulloa Elías
- Succeeded by: Armando Villanueva

First Vice President of the Constituent Assembly
- In office 28 July 1978 – 13 July 1979
- President: Víctor Raúl Haya de la Torre

Member of the Constituent Assembly
- In office 28 July 1978 – 13 July 1979

Member of the Chamber of Deputies
- In office 28 July 1945 – 29 October 1948
- Constituency: Lima

Member of the Constituent Congress
- In office 8 December 1931 – 8 January 1932 (Deposed)

Personal details
- Born: 12 October 1900 Lima, Peru
- Died: 6 February 1994 (aged 93) Lima, Peru
- Party: Peruvian Aprista Party
- Education: National University of San Marcos

Luis Alberto Félix Sánchez Sánchez (12 October 1900 – 6 February 1994) was a Peruvian lawyer, jurist, philosopher, historian, writer and politician. A historic member of the Peruvian Aprista Party, he became a Senator and member of two Constitutional Assemblies, in which the second one (1978–1980), he occupied the vice-presidency of the Assembly and the presidency of the Constitution Committee. During the presidency of Alan García (1985–1990), he was his Second Vice President and was appointed for a short period as Prime Minister of Peru. In Congress he served as President of the Senate two occasions (1966–1967 and 1985–1986). He is the oldest Vice President of Peru, taking office at the age of 84 years, 289 days.

== Biography ==
The figure of Luis Alberto Sanchez, who was born at Lima in 1900, covers most of the century. He was three times Provost of the Universidad Nacional Mayor de San Marcos. Together with Raúl Porras Barrenechea and Jorge Guillermo Leguia, he was one of the leading figures of the Conversation University founded in 1919 with the participation, among others, of Víctor Raúl Haya de la Torre, Jorge Basadre, Carlos Paz Soldan Moreyra, Ricardo Garcia and Jose Luis Vegas Llosa Belaunde.

Among his literary works and news articles we have a large amount from Garcilaso Inca de la Vega, first Creole (1939), Aladdin or life and work of Jose Santos Chocano (1960), process and content of the Latin American novel (1968), comparative History of American literature (1973–1976), to Indianism and Indigenism in Peruvian literature (1981).

But his main work and the dearest was dedicated to Manuel González Prada, which took shape with titles like 'Don Manuel' (1930), 'Myth and Reality of Gonzalez Prada' (1976), 'Our lives are the rivers ... History and legend of González Prada' (1977) and a substantial variety of editions of the work of González Prada. As a politician, was a prominent figure of the Peruvian Aprista Party and scored the second most votes, after Victor Raul Haya de la Torre, during the general elections to constitute the Constituent Assembly in 1979. He was elected Second Vice President of Peru in 1985, as the running mate of Alan García. He was also re-elected as Senator at the same time.

== Last years and death ==
At the end of his life, in 1990 he was elected Senator and served until the closing of Congress by the 1992 self-coup of Alberto Fujimori. He died in 1994 in Lima, dedicating his last days to writing.

He taught at the Deutsche Schule Lima Alexander von Humboldt.

Political offices
Preceded by Armando Villanueva del Campo	Prime Minister of Peru; 15 May 1989 – 30 September 1989	Succeeded by Guillermo Larco Cox
