= Abel Salinas =

Peruvian politician

Abel Salinas Izaguirre (May 12, 1930 – August 1, 2012) was a Peruvian politician. In 1985 under Alan García's government he served as Interior Minister, and in 1987 as Energy Minister and in 1988 Minister of Economy and Finance. In 1990, he was elected Senator of the Republic, by the APRA Party ticket, and unsuccessfully ran for the Presidency of Peru in the 2000 elections, winning about 1.3% of the vote. He died on August 1, 2012.

== Biography ==
He was born in Supe Puerto on May 12, 1930.

He completed his school studies at the Colegio Nuestra Señora de Guadalupe in Lima.

Abel Salinas studied Mechanical and Electrical Engineering at the National Engineering University. He also studied Economics at the Pontificia Universidad Católica de Chile.

He was director of the National Housing Corporation.

== Political career ==
He was a member of the Peruvian Aprista Party from a young age in 1943. In the party, he was Secretary of the Organization of the Aprista Guadalupana Youth (1947) as well as a member of the National Executive Committee, Secretary General of the National Association of Aprista Engineers and Architects.

On August 28, 1985, Salinas assumed as Minister of the Interior during the First Government of Alan García, he held the position until June 17, 1987. On June 27, 1987, he was appointed Minister of Energy and Mines by former President Alan García.

He resigned from office on September 5, 1988.

On September 2, 1988, he was appointed Minister of Economy, the days before his inauguration, the official price of the dollar was 33 intis and the price of the dollar on the street (the so-called "parallel dollar") was 284 intis. Trying to bring the price of the official dollar to the same level as the price of the parallel dollar, the minister gave a "package" that was known as the "Salinazo", in which the Peruvian currency was drastically devalued. From 33 intis per official dollar, 250 intis per official dollar was paid. After that, more "paquetazos" would be applied in his management, trying to give a remedy to the economic crisis.

== Death ==
He died on August 1, 2012.

Party political offices
Preceded by Mercedes Cabanillas	Peruvian Aprista Party presidential candidate 2000 – (Lost)	Succeeded by Alan García
Preceded by Alan García	Secretary General of the Peruvian Aprista Party; 1992	Succeeded by Agustin Mantilla
