= Ministry of Agriculture (Peru) =

Government ministry of Peru

Ministry of Agricultural Development and Irrigation
- Ministerio de Desarrollo Agrario y Riego
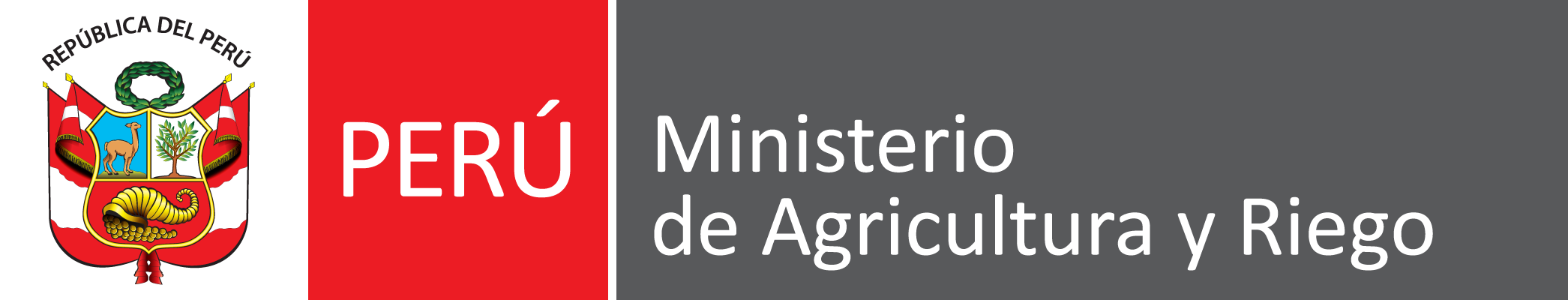

Agency overview
- Formed: 1943; 83 years ago
- Headquarters: La Universidad 200, La Molina, Lima
- Parent agency: Prime Minister of Peru
- Website: www.gob.pe/midagri

The Ministry of Agricultural Development and Irrigation (Spanish: Ministerio de Desarrollo Agrario y Riego, MIDAGRI) is the government ministry in charge of the overseeing and regulation of the agrarian sector of Peru. As of 2025, the minister is Ángel Manero Campos.

== History ==
The Ministry of Agriculture (Spanish: Ministerio de Agricultura) was created by Law 9711 on January 2, 1943 by the government of president Manuel Prado Ugarteche, with Benjamín Roca García serving as its first officeholder. His successor, Godofredo Labarthe, renamed the ministry to "Ministry of Agriculture and Feeding" (Spanish: Ministerio de Agricultura y Alimentación), a name that remained until the presidency of José Luis Bustamante y Rivero. It was again renamed in 2013 to Ministry of Agriculture and Irrigation (Spanish: Ministerio de Agricultura y Riego), under the Presidency of Ollanta Humala.

In 2020, the Congress of Peru renamed the ministry to its current name, although under the MINDAR accronym.

== Organization ==
- Minister of Agrarian Development and Irrigation
- Vice Minister of Family Farming Development, Agrarian Infrastructure, and Irrigation
  - General Directorate of Agrarian Policies
  - General Directorate of Policy Monitoring and Evaluation
  - General Directorate of Intergovernmental Coordination
- Vice Minister of Agrarian Development Policies and Oversight
  - General Directorate of Agriculture
  - General Directorate of Livestock
  - General Directorate of Agrarian Environmental Affairs
  - General Directorate of Agrarian Infrastructure and Irrigation
- General Secretariat
  - General Office of Agrarian Planning and Budget
  - General Office of Legal Counsel
  - General Office of Administration
  - General Office of Human Resources Management
- Agrarian Advisory Council
- Internal Audit Office
- Public Prosecutor's Office
- General Directorate of Agrarian Business
- Regional Directorates Agrarian
- Agrarian Agencies

== List of ministers ==
No.	Portrait	Name	Took office	Left office	President
1		Benjamín Roca García	2 January 1943	15 April 1943	Manuel Prado Ugarteche
2		Godofredo Labarthe Durand	27 April 1943	26 July 1945	Manuel Prado Ugarteche
3		Enrique Basombrio Echenique	1 August 1945	26 September 1945	José Bustamante y Rivero
4		Oswaldo Gonzáles Tafur	3 October 1945	22 January 1946	José Bustamante y Rivero
5		Luis Rose Ugarte	26 January 1946	9 January 1947	José Bustamante y Rivero
6		Pedro Venturo Zapata	15 January 1947	27 February 1948	José Bustamante y Rivero
7		Armando Zamudio Colmenares	1 March 1948	15 June 1948	José Bustamante y Rivero
8		Rómulo Ferrero Rebagliati	21 June 1948	31 August 1948	José Bustamante y Rivero
9		Carlos Alzamora Elster	3 September 1948	24 October 1948	José Bustamante y Rivero
10		Carlos Miñano Mendocilla	2 November 1948	31 May 1949	Manuel A. Odría
11		Alberto Leon Diaz	2 June 1949	26 July 1950	Manuel A. Odría
12		Luis Dibos Dammert	3 August 1950	2 August 1952	Manuel A. Odría
13		José Alberto León Fontenoy	4 August 1952	10 August 1954	Manuel A. Odría
14		Jaime Miranda Sosa	11 August 1954	3 December 1955	Manuel A. Odría
15		Emilio Foley Gatjens	6 December 1955	25 December 1955	Manuel A. Odría
16		Carlos Enrique Siles Beroni	26 December 1955	27 July 1956	Manuel A. Odría
17		Ignacio Masias Garcia	1 August 1956	20 September 1957	Manuel Prado Ugarteche
18		Enrique Labarthe Correa	26 September 1957	18 March 1959	Manuel Prado Ugarteche
19		Emilio Foley Gatjens	19 March 1959	20 July 1959	Manuel Prado Ugarteche
20		Alex Zarak Risi	21 July 1959	22 November 1961	Manuel Prado Ugarteche
21		Carlos Moreyra y Paz Soldán	23 November 1961	16 July 1962	Manuel Prado Ugarteche
22		Jesús Melgar Escuti	19 July 1962	16 November 1962	Ricardo Pérez Godoy
23		José Gagliardi Schiaffino	20 November 1962	4 December 1962	Ricardo Pérez Godoy
24		Alfonso Teran Brambilla	5 December 1962	27 July 1963	Ricardo Pérez Godoy
25		Enrique Torres Llosa	31 July 1963	31 July 1964	Fernando Belaúnde Terry
26		Victor Ganoza Plaza	1 August 1964	31 January 1965	Fernando Belaúnde Terry
27		Javier Silva Ruete	21 February 1965	14 September 1965	Fernando Belaúnde Terry
28		Carlos Fernández Sesarego	5 July 1965	14 September 1965	Fernando Belaúnde Terry
29		Rafael Cubas Vinatea	15 September 1965	24 November 1965	Fernando Belaúnde Terry
30		Javier Silva Ruete	25 November 1965	6 September 1967	Fernando Belaúnde Terry
31		Fernando Villa Salcedo	7 September 1967	12 November 1967	Fernando Belaúnde Terry
32		Orlando Olcese Pachas	17 November 1967	1 October 1968	Fernando Belaúnde Terry
33		Fernando Uranga Bustios	2 October 1968	2 October 1968	Fernando Belaúnde Terry
34		Jose Benavides Benavides	3 October 1968	12 June 1969	Juan Velasco Alvarado
35		Jose Barandearan Pagador	12 June 1969	31 March 1971	Juan Velasco Alvarado
36		Enrique Valdez Angulo	1 April 1971	5 November 1974	Juan Velasco Alvarado
37		Enrique Gallegos Venero	6 November 1974	15 July 1976	Juan Velasco Alvarado
38		Rafael Hoyos Rubio	January 1975	December 1976	Francisco Morales Bermúdez
39		Luis Arbulu Ibañez	16 July 1976	22 July 1979	Francisco Morales Bermúdez
40		Carlos Gamarra Perez Egaña	23 July 1979	27 July 1980	Francisco Morales Bermúdez
41		Nils Ericcson Correa	28 July 1980	2 January 1983	Fernando Belaúnde Terry
42		Mirko Cuculiza Torre	3 January 1983	2 August 1983	Fernando Belaúnde Terry
43		Juan Carlos Hurtado Miller	3 August 1983	27 July 1985	Fernando Belaúnde Terry
44		Mario Barturen Dueñas	28 July 1985	8 January 1986	Alan García
45		Remigio Morales Bermúdez Pedraglio	9 January 1986	10 October 1988	Alan García
46		Juan Manuel Coronado Balmaceda	10 October 1988	30 October 1989	Alan García
47		Isaac Roberto Angeles Lazo	31 October 1989	28 July 1990	Alan García
48		Carlos Amat y León Chávez	28 July 1990	23 October 1990	Alberto Fujimori
49		Enrique Rossl Link	23 October 1990	18 December 1991	Alberto Fujimori
50		Gustavo González Prieto	18 December 1991	6 April 1992	Alberto Fujimori
51		Absalón Vásquez Villanueva	6 April 1992	3 April 1996	Alberto Fujimori
52		Rodolfo Muñante Sanguinetti	3 April 1996	6 January 1999	Alberto Fujimori
53		Belisario De las Casas Piedra	6 January 1999	28 July 2000	Alberto Fujimori
54		José Chlimper Ackerman	29 July 2000	25 November 2000	Alberto Fujimori
55		Carlos Amat y León Chávez	25 November 2000	28 July 2001	Valentín Paniagua
56		Álvaro Quijandría Salmón	28 July 2001	28 June 2003	Alejandro Toledo
57		Francisco Gonzalés García	28 June 2003	December 2003	Alejandro Toledo
58		Jose Leon Rivera	December 2003	12 June 2004	Alejandro Toledo
59		Álvaro Quijandría Salmón	12 June 2004	25 January 2005	Alejandro Toledo
60		Manuel Manrique Ugarte	25 January 2005	28 July 2006	Alejandro Toledo
61		Juan José Salazar García	28 July 2006	20 May 2007	Alan García
62		Ismael Benavides Ferreyros	20 May 2007	14 October 2008	Alan García
63		Carlos Leyton Muñoz	14 October 2008	10 July 2010	Alan García
64		Adolfo de Córdova Vélez	10 July 2010	14 September 2010	Alan García
65		Rafael Quevedo Flores	14 September 2010	13 May 2011	Alan García
66		Jorge Villasante Araníbar	13 May 2011	28 July 2011	Alan García
67		Miguel Caillaux Zazzali	28 July 2011	10 December 2011	Ollanta Humala
68		Luis Romano Ginocchio Balcázar	10 December 2011	23 July 2012	Ollanta Humala
69		Milton von Hesse	23 July 2012	24 February 2014	Ollanta Humala
70		Juan Manuel Benites Ramos	24 February 2014	28 July 2016	Ollanta Humala
71		José Manuel Hernández Calderón	28 July 2016	9 January 2018	Pedro Pablo Kuczynski
72		José Arista Arbildo	9 January 2018	2 April 2018	Pedro Pablo Kuczynski
73		Gustavo Mostajo Ocola	2 April 2018	11 March 2019	Martín Vizcarra
74		Fabiola Muñoz Dodero	11 March 2019	30 September 2019	Martín Vizcarra
75		Jorge Montenegro Chavesta	3 October 2019	12 November 2020	Martín Vizcarra
76		Fernando Hurtado Pascual	12 November 2020	17 November 2020	Manuel Merino
77		Federico Tenorio Calderón	18 November 2020	28 July 2021	Francisco Sagasti
78		Víctor Maita Frisancho	29 July 2021	1 February 2022	Pedro Castillo
79		Alberto Ramos Quilca	1 February 2022	8 February 2022	Pedro Castillo
80		Óscar Zea Choquechambi	8 February 2022	22 May 2022	Pedro Castillo
81		Javier Arce Alvarado	22 May 2022	6 June 2022	Pedro Castillo
82		Andrés Alencastre	6 June 2022	7 December 2022	Pedro Castillo

== See also ==
- Council of Ministers of Peru
- External Website
- Government of Peru
