= Jorge Flores (politician) =

Peruvian politician (born 1929)

Jorge Flores Torres

Member of Congress
- In office 26 July 2006 – 26 July 2011
- Constituency: Tacna

Member of the Chamber of Deputies
- In office 26 July 1990 – 5 April 1992
- Constituency: Tacna

Minister of War of Peru
- In office 26 July 1985 – 1 April 1987
- Preceded by: Julián Juliá Freyre
- Succeeded by: None

Personal details
- Born: 11 April 1929 (age 97) Lima, Peru
- Party: Peruvian Aprista Party
- Education: Chorrillos Military School
- Profession: Military

Jorge León Flores Torres (born 11 April 1929) is a Peruvian politician and a former Congressman representing Tacna for the 2006–2011 term. He was previously a deputy representing the Tacna region from 1990 to 1992 when President Alberto Fujimori shut Congress down in a self-coup. Flores belongs to the Peruvian Aprista Party.
