= Luis Alva Castro =

Peruvian economist and politician

Luis Alva Castro OSP
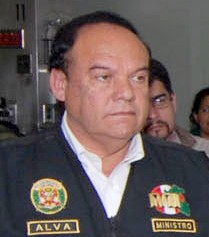

President of Congress
- In office July 26, 2009 – July 26, 2010
- Preceded by: Alejandro Aguinaga (Acting)
- Succeeded by: César Zumaeta

Minister of the Interior
- In office February 26, 2007 – October 14, 2008
- President: Alan García
- Prime Minister: Jorge Del Castillo
- Preceded by: Pilar Mazzetti
- Succeeded by: Remigio Hernani Meloni

Member of Congress
- In office July 26, 2001 – July 26, 2011
- Constituency: La Libertad
- In office July 26, 2000 – July 26, 2001
- Constituency: National

President of the Chamber of Deputies
- In office July 26, 1987 – July 26, 1988
- Preceded by: Fernando León de Vivero
- Succeeded by: Héctor Vargas Haya

Prime Minister of Peru
- In office July 28, 1985 – June 26, 1987
- President: Alan García
- Preceded by: Luis Pércovich Roca
- Succeeded by: Guillermo Larco Cox

Minister of Economy and Finance
- In office July 28, 1985 – June 26, 1987
- President: Alan García
- Prime Minister: Luis Alva Castro
- Preceded by: Guillermo Garrido-Lecca Álvarez
- Succeeded by: Gustavo Saberbein Chevalier

Second Vice President of Peru
- In office July 28, 1985 – July 28, 1990
- President: Alan García
- Preceded by: Javier Alva Orlandini
- Succeeded by: Carlos García y García

Member of the Chamber of Deputies
- In office July 26, 1980 – July 26, 1990
- Constituency: La Libertad

Secretary General of the Peruvian Aprista Party
- In office 1989–1992
- Preceded by: Luis Negreiros
- Succeeded by: Alan García

Personal details
- Born: Luis Juan Alva Castro; 17 February 1942 (age 84) Trujillo, La Libertad, Peru
- Party: Partido Aprista Peruano
- Education: National University of Trujillo
- Website: congreso.gob.pe

Luis Juan Alva Castro (born 17 February 1942) is a Peruvian economist and politician. In his political career, he achieved the government positions of Second Vice President of Peru, Prime Minister of Peru, President of the Congress and among other portfolios during both administrations of President Alan García.

A prominent member of the Peruvian Aprista Party, he was the party's presidential nominee in 1990, getting 22.5% of the vote and placing third overall and failed to qualify for the runoff that was eventually won by Alberto Fujimori. He has authored numerous works about Víctor Raúl Haya de la Torre's lifetime, being considered one of the few historians of "Aprismo" in Peru. He currently presides the editorial "Instituto Víctor Raúl Haya de la Torre", which publishes his works.

== Biography ==
Luis Alva Castro was born in the city of Trujillo, in a family with a long Aprista tradition. His parents were Luis Alva and Rosalía Castro.

Transferred to Lima, he completed his primary studies at the Claretian School and his secondary studies at the Leoncio Prado Military School. He returned to his hometown and in 1960 he entered the Faculty of Economics at the National University of Trujillo, where he graduated from high school and obtained the title of economist, thanks to his thesis on "Economic Integration of Latin America" (1964).

In 1996, he studied a postgraduate degree in Political Science at the Inca Garcilaso de la Vega University.

== Political career ==
=== Early political career ===
Alva started at a very young age in the Peruvian Aprista Party, being part of the youth wing since he was 15 years old. His first partisan office was Secretary of the Northern Regional Command in 1965. He graduated in 1964 with a Bachelor in Economics from the National University of Trujillo, based on the merit of his thesis titled "Economic Integration of Latin America".

At 24, he was a member of the board of directors of the Development Corporation of La Libertad (CORLIB), whose experience in planning and management applied him as an executive of private and public companies. The military government of Juan Velasco Alvarado unjustly accused him of mishandling and was imprisoned in a Trujillo prison, from 1970 to 1972.

During the development of the Constituent Assembly of 1978–1979, he served as Private Secretary of Víctor Raúl Haya de la Torre, becoming one of his most conspicuous disciples.

=== Congress ===
In the 1980 general election, he was the Campaign Head of Peruvian Aprista Party presidential nominee Armando Villanueva. He was elected to the Chamber of Deputies, representing La Libertad for the 1980–1985 term, serving as the Party Spokesperson.

=== In government ===
In 1985, he was selected as part of Alan García presidential ticket for the 1985 general election in which he was the second running mate of García. Jointly reelected to Congress, he was appointed Prime Minister and Finance Minister, serving between 1985 and 1987. Peru developed a steady economy during his tenure, promoting heterodoxy as a good start. The economic plan proposed by Alan García clashed with Alva, leaving his post as the economy would prove to be artificial, evolving into a catastrophic policy of Macroeconomic populism.

One month later after his resignation as both Prime Minister and Finance Minister, Alva was elected as President of the Chamber of Deputies, serving for one year. His increasing party support would prove him as a potential rival in the party leadership to president Alan García. In 1989, he was elected as Secretary General of the Peruvian Aprista Party.

=== 1990 presidential campaign ===
With the country in crisis and the constant attacks from the Shining Path and MRTA, the population participated in the 1990 general election. Since 1987, acclaimed writer Mario Vargas Llosa had prepared a full-scale presidential campaign with the Democratic Front coalition, composed of Liberty Movement, the Christian People's Party and Popular Action, the last two being traditional parties. The Peruvian Aprista Party nominated Alva to run for the Presidency against Vargas Llosa, although it was clear that the latter would win in the first round. Unexpectedly, third party nominee and virtually unknown Alberto Fujimori of Cambio 90 rose in the polls with a clear anti-partisan speech, beating Alva to the second round as the APRA achieved 22.5% of the popular vote and placed third. The election outcome would give victory to Alberto Fujimori, with most analysts discussing a possible agreement with president Alan García, as Alva's votes would pass on to Fujimori.

=== Return to Congress ===
The Peruvian Aprista Party, led by Alva from outside Congress as Secretary General, achieved 53 deputies and 16 senators, representing a third of each chamber. The congressional term would end with the 1992 self-coup, which dissolved the entire legislative branch.

In the following years, under the Fujimori's government, Alva would not have greater political participation, except in his party when he was elected again as Secretary General in 1996, a position he held until 1999.

In the 2000 general election, he was elected to Congress with a majority of 35,336 votes. The 2000–2005 term would be shortened with the convoking of new general elections for 2001, due to the corruption allegations against Alberto Fujimori and his resignation. In those elections, Alva was reelected to Congress with a majority of 95,050 votes. Based on his experience and high vote count, he was appointed Party Spokesperson, a position he exerted while serving in the abolished Chamber of Deputies. He also served as President of the Andean Community of Nations in 2001.

In August 2005, he was appointed President of the Víctor Raúl Haya de la Torre Private Institute. During this time, he published a renowned work titled "The Asylum Man" (El Señor Asilo), based on Haya de la Torre's experience as political refugee in the Colombian Embassy in Peru, during the proceedings of the Asylum case determined by the International Court of Justice.

For the 2006 general election, Alva was appointed Peruvian Aprista Party Campaign Head for the North, proving the victory for Alan García with the Aprista stronghold in the North of Peru. Conjointly, he was reelected for a third term in Congress, with a majority of 57,409 votes. During the 2006–2011 parliamentary term, he was elected President of the Congress for a year in 2009, for the 2009-2010, being his first time in charge of the same legislative body since 1987 when he was the President of the Chamber of Deputies.

=== Second García administration ===
Alva was Minister of the Interior from 2007 to 2008, succeeding Pilar Mazzetti. His tenure lasted a little more than a year and a half. After the resignation of Jorge del Castillo as Prime Minister due to the 2008 Peru oil scandal, Alva Castro was not confirmed in his position by new Prime Minister Yehude Simon, being succeeded by former Police General Remigio Hernani Meloni.

=== Post-Congressional career ===
Alva failed to achieve a fourth reelection to Congress in the 2011 general election. During the campaign, he was involved in a deadly car accident in the Agallpampa District, Otuzco Province. He was the only survivor, as the other Peruvian Aprista Party provincial leaders accompanying him perished in the accident.

== Controversies ==
On 11 April 2019, at the request of chief prosecutor José Domingo Pérez, judge Richard Concepción Carhuancho gave Alva impediment to leave the country for 18 months, for alleged money laundering, in the framework of the investigation by Odebrecht scandal in Peru. According to the prosecutor's thesis, Alva, in his position of Campaign Head, personally managed to have the Brazilian conglomerate Odebrecht financially support the 2006 Peruvian Aprista Party election campaign, having received US$200,000 in bribes.

Political offices
Preceded by Luis Pércovich Roca	Prime Minister of Peru; July 1985 – June 1987	Succeeded by Guillermo Larco Cox
Party political offices
Preceded by Luis Negreiros	Secretary General of the Peruvian Aprista Party; 1989–1992	Succeeded by Alan García
Preceded by Alan García	Partido Aprista presidential nominee 1990 – (Lost)	Succeeded by Mercedes Cabanillas
