= Orestes Rodríguez Campos =

Orestes Rodríguez Campos (1934-1990) was a Peruvian politician. He served as Labor minister under Alan García and later as an APRA Senator. He was killed by Shining Path in 1990.
