= Orlando Olcese =

Dr. Orlando Olcese served as the rector of "La Universidad Agraria La Molina" from 1966 to 1968.

His Board was as follows:

Vice-Presidente: Guillermo Gómez
Vocal Economía: Dante Rocca Pereyra
Vocal Actas: Alfonso Chirinos Almanza
Vocal Cultura: José Ducato Backus
Vocal RR.PP.: Alberto Ordóñez
Vocal Act. Soc. y Asistencia Social: Alfredo Montes

He served as the head of the United Nations Capital Development Fund, a banking institution. He also co-founded, and still actively participates in the I.P.C (International Potato Center) Organization.
