= 2008 Peru oil scandal =

Peruvian political scandal

The 2008 Peru oil scandal started after a Peruvian TV station broadcast an audio tape of an alleged conversation between a government official and a lobbyist agreeing to help a firm win contracts. The speakers were allegedly Alberto Quimper, an executive in Petroperú, the state company in charge of promoting foreign investment in the petroleum sector, and a prominent lobbyist and politician member of the Apra party Rómulo León Alegría discussing payments to help the Norwegian company Discover Petroleum win contracts. This was followed by street protests led by workers, teachers, builders and doctors for the resignation of the Council of Ministers. The scandal led to the resignation of Prime Minister Jorge del Castillo and the appointment of a new cabinet headed by Yehude Simon.

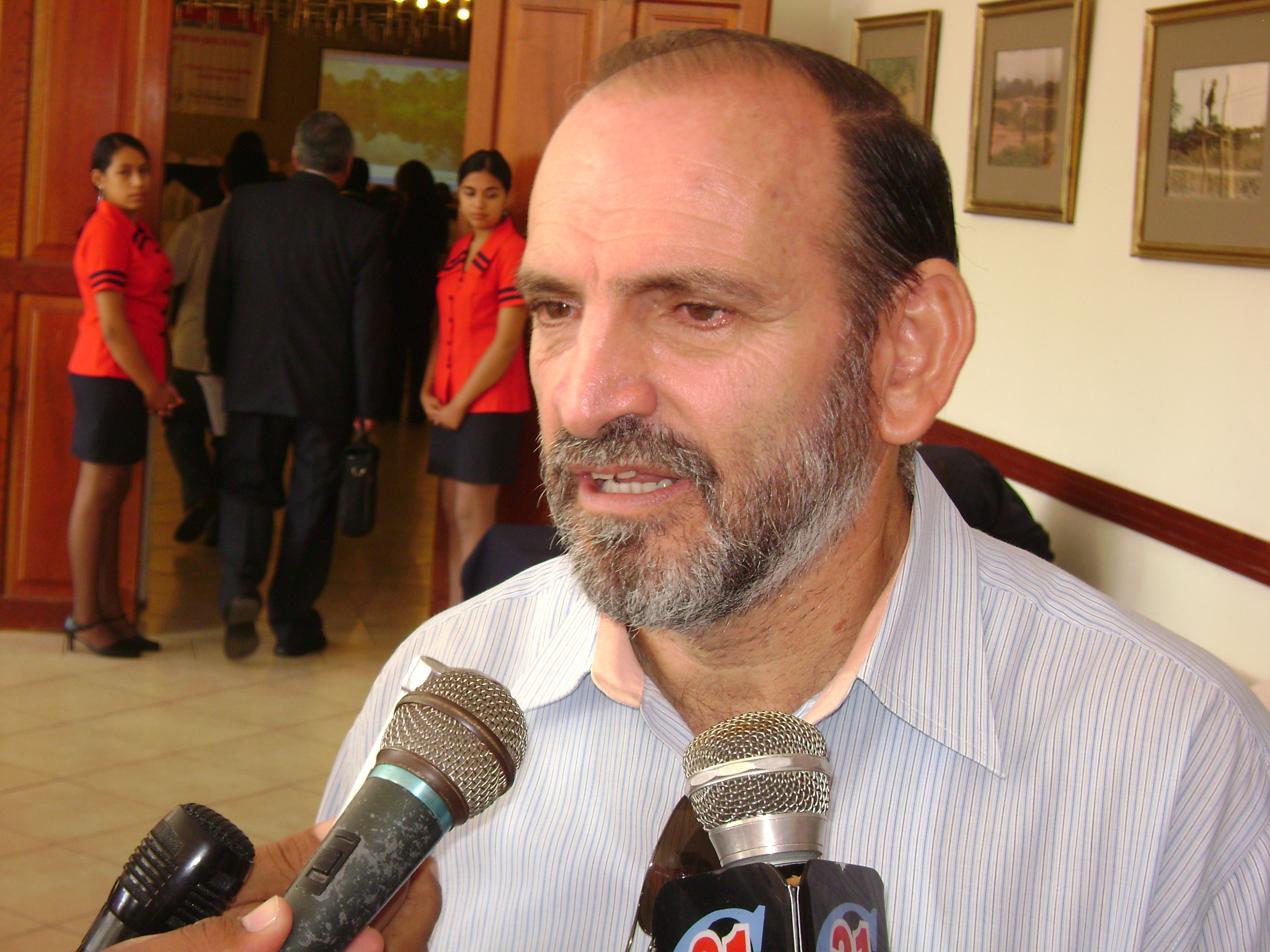
Yehude Simon, former prime minister of Peru

== Tape ==
On October 5, 2008, TV news magazine Cuarto Poder broadcast alleged audio recordings of Alberto Quimper, vice-president of Petroperú, and Rómulo León Alegría, a lobbyist and prominent member of the APRA, the party that was currently in office. In the tape, they discussed secretive $10,000 monthly payments to Quimper, León and Ernesto Arias-Schreiber, the legal representative of the company Discover in Peru, in exchange for steering lucrative petroleum contracts to explore offshore oil blocks and gas fields in Peru Discover's way.

== Consequences ==
Thousands of workers, including teachers, builders and doctors protested in Peru calling for the resignation of the government. On October 10, 2008, Prime Minister Jorge del Castillo submitted resignation of his cabinet to president Alan García. A new cabinet led by 61-year-old Yehude Simon was sworn in on October 14, 2008. He had been the president of the Lambayeque Region and is from outside the ruling party.

On February 16, 2016, a Peruvian court acquitted Rómulo León, former Petroperu president César Gutiérrez, former Perupetro president Daniel Saba, former Discover Petroleum director Jostein Kjerstad and six other defendants in the case. Meanwhile, Peru's statutes of limitations exonerated Alberto Quimper when he turned 75 years old.
