= Guillermo Larco Cox =

Peruvian politician

Prime Minister of Peru
- In office 30 September 1989 – 28 July 1990
- President: Alan García
- Preceded by: Luis Alberto Sánchez
- Succeeded by: Juan Carlos Hurtado Miller
- In office 26 June 1987 – 17 May 1988
- Preceded by: Luis Alva Castro
- Succeeded by: Armando Villanueva

Minister of Foreign Relations
- In office 1 March 1989 – 28 July 1990
- President: Alan García
- Preceded by: Luis Gonzales Posada
- Succeeded by: Luis Marchand Stens

Minister of the Presidency
- In office 27 June 1987 – 13 May 1988
- President: Alan García
- Preceded by: Nicanor Mujica Álvarez-Calderón
- Succeeded by: Armando Villanueva

Member of the Senate
- In office 26 July 1985 – 26 July 1990

Member of the Chamber of Deputies
- In office 26 July 1980 – 26 July 1985
- Constituency: Lima

Mayor of the Province of Trujillo
- In office 1 January 1964 – 1 January 1970
- Preceded by: Victor Larco Herrera
- Succeeded by: Jorge Torres Vallejo

Personal details
- Born: 19 February 1932 Trujillo, La Libertad, Peru
- Died: 12 July 2002 (aged 70) Lima, Peru
- Party: Peruvian Aprista Party

Guillermo Larco Cox (February 19, 1932 – July 12, 2002), was a civil engineer and Peruvian politician. Member of the Peruvian Aprista Party, he achieved the position of Senator and Prime Minister.

== Early life and career ==
Guillermo Larco Cox was born in Trujillo on February 19, 1932. Son of Victor Larco and Alicia Cox; his siblings were Carolina, Alicia, and Victor Larco Cox. He married Laura Manucci, with whom he had 6 children (Mariana, Laura, Javier, Ricardo (†2011), Guillermo (†2005) and Alicia).

In 1961, was elected President of the 1st Directive Board of the Firemen department of Trujillo.

== Political career ==
He joined the Peruvian Aprista Party in his youth, which led him to become the first democratically elected Mayor of Trujillo in 1963, serving until 1969. From 1980 to 1985 he was elected to the Chamber of Deputies for the Department of La Libertad, and then as a Senator for the term 1985-1990. Elected for the Vice-Presidency of the Senate for the term 1986-1987.

During his term in the Senate, he also had the chance to serve under Alan García's first term as Head of the Cabinet, (from June 27, 1987 to May 13, 1988 and from September 30, 1989 to July 28, 1990). Among other positions, Larco was appointed Minister of the Presidency and as Minister of Foreign Relations.

After Alan García's first term ended, Larco briefly retired from politics until the 2000, when he ran for a seat in Congress under the APRA party, but was not elected because he received a minority of votes and subsequently retired from politics until his death on July 12, 2002 in his house in the Limean district of San Isidro.

== Honours ==
- The Order of the Sun

== See also ==
- Alan García

Political offices
Preceded by Luis Alva Castro	Prime Minister of Peru; 1987–1988	Succeeded by Armando Villanueva
Preceded by Luis Alberto Sánchez	Prime Minister of Peru; 1989–1990	Succeeded by Juan Carlos Hurtado Miller
