= Armando Villanueva =

Peruvian politician

Armando Villanueva del Campo
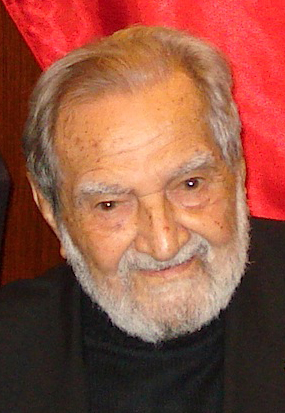

Prime Minister of Peru
- In office 17 May 1988 – 15 May 1989
- President: Alan García
- Preceded by: Guillermo Larco Cox
- Succeeded by: Luis Alberto Sánchez

Minister of the Interior
- In office 2 March 1989 – 15 May 1989
- President: Alan García
- Preceded by: Juan Soria Díaz
- Succeeded by: Agustín Mantilla

Minister of the Presidency
- In office 13 May 1988 – 2 March 1989
- President: Alan García
- Preceded by: Guillermo Larco Cox
- Succeeded by: Luis Alberto Sánchez

Member of the Senate
- In office 26 July 1985 – 5 April 1992

President of the Senate
- In office 26 July 1987 – 26 July 1988
- Preceded by: Luis Alberto Sánchez
- Succeeded by: Ramiro Prialé

President of the Chamber of Deputies
- In office 28 July 1967 – 28 July 1968
- Preceded by: Antonio Monsalve Morante
- Succeeded by: Andrés Townsend

Member of the Chamber of Deputies
- In office 28 July 1963 – 3 October 1968
- Constituency: Lima

Personal details
- Born: Armando Villanueva del Campo; 25 November 1915 Lima, Peru
- Died: 14 April 2013 (aged 97) Lima, Peru
- Party: Peruvian Aprista Party
- Spouse: Lucy Ortega de Villanueva (died 3 December 2015)

Armando Villanueva del Campo (25 November 1915 – 14 April 2013) was a Peruvian politician who was the leader of the Peruvian American Popular Revolutionary Alliance. Born in Lima, his parents were Pedro Villanueva Urquijo, a gynecologist in the city, and Carmen Rosa Portal del Campo. His only legitimate sibling was his older brother Ing. Pedro Villanueva del Campo Portal.

== Political career ==
At the age of 15 Villanueva became a member of APRA's Juventud Aprista Peruana in opposition to the military dictatorship of Luis Miguel Sánchez Cerro. At the age of 18 he was imprisoned in El Frontón prison (located on the small island of San Lorenzo off the coast of Callao, Lima's main port) for his subversive activities in Peru. He was a political ally and personal friend of Víctor Raúl Haya de la Torre, the founder and most prominent leader of the APRA party.

Villanueva spent most of his early life in different prisons for his political activities. In 1940, along with other APRA political activists, Villanueva was exiled to Chile. Between the 1940s and 1960s Villanueva spent his time in between Peruvian prisons and deportations to Chile and Argentina. While living in Santiago he met and married Lucia Ortega. They had a daughter: Lucia del Pilar Villanueva Ortega.

In late 1961, before a general amnesty was granted to members of APRA, Villanueva entered Peru clandestinely. He needed to start organizing the multiple party cells in preparation for their return to full political activities. Afraid that he would be caught, he sought refuge at his cousin's house in San Isidro. Ana Maria Villanueva de Riva-Vercellotti was married to an Italian, and Armando was convinced that Peru's secret police would never find him there. He was able to stay there, unperturbed, till full amnesty was granted.

From 1963 to 1968 Villanueva served as a deputy in the lower house of the Peruvian legislature representing Lima, serving as President of the Chamber of Deputies from 1967 to 1968. Villanueva led the Aprista opposition to the military government of Juan Velasco.

The death of Haya de la Torre in 1979 propelled Villanueva to the leadership of the APRA party. As leader of the party Villanueva ran for the presidency in 1980 resulting in a second-place loss to the Popular Action party candidate Fernando Belaúnde. It is said that he lost the elections because the opposition mounted a negative campaign against him, claiming that he was married to a Chilean-born citizen. Chile's victory in the Guerra del Pacifico in 1883, which resulted in Peru losing a large chunk of its southern border to Chile, is still a subject of bad feeling in Peru.

In 1985 Villanueva was elected to the Peruvian Senate and elected as the President of the Senate from July 1986 to July 1987. During the presidency of Alan García, he served as prime minister from 1988 to 1989. In 1990 Villanueva was elected to his last term in the Senate, from 1990 to 1992 when Alberto Fujimori shut down Congress.

Villanueva retired in 2005, at the age of 90, to dedicate the rest of his life to his family and writing. In May 2005, with the death of his cousin Ana Maria, he also assumed the title of family patriarch. He died on 14 April 2013 at the age of 97. A private wake was held the following day at his home in Chacarilla, being moved to the Casa del Pueblo on the 16th and buried at El Ángel Cemetery on the 17th.

Preceded by Víctor Raúl Haya de la Torre	Partido Aprista presidential candidate 1980 – (Lost)	Succeeded by Alan García
Preceded by Víctor Raúl Haya de la Torre	Leader of the Peruvian Aprista Party; 1979–1985	Succeeded by Alan García
