= Presidential candidates of the 2026 Peruvian general election =

The 2026 Peruvian general election saw a record number of presidential candidates participate, with 36 individuals appearing on the initial ballot on 12 and 13 April 2026. The first round ballot itself measured 16.5 inches (42 cm) by 17.3 inches (44 cm), was described as being the size of a pizza box and had candidates placed in five separate columns. The remaining candidates who went to a run-off election, Keiko Fujimori and Roberto Sánchez, were present on the 7 June 2026 ballot.

== Candidates ==
=== Presidential nominees ===
The following nominees have filed to run at the National Jury of Elections once having won their respective primaries:

==== Advanced to second round ====
Name	Born	Experience	Home department	Campaign	Ref
Keiko Fujimori	25 May 1975 (age 51); Lima	President of Popular Force (2010–present); Member of the Congress of the Republic (2006–2011); First Lady of Peru (1994–2000); 2021, 2016, and 2011 presidential candidate	Lima	Running for: Popular Force Announced: 30 October 2025	
Roberto Sánchez	3 February 1969 (age 57); Huaral, Lima	Member of the Congress of the Republic (2021–present); President of Together for Peru (2017–present); Minister of Foreign Trade and Tourism (2021–2022)	Lima	Running for: Together for Peru Announced: 25 May 2025	

==== Eliminated in first round ====
Name	Born	Experience	Home department	Campaign	Ref
Rafael López Aliaga	11 February 1961 (age 65); Lima	President of Popular Renewal (2020–present); Mayor of Lima (2023–2025); Member of the Lima Metropolitan Council (2007–2010); 2021 presidential candidate	Lima	Running for: Popular Renewal Announced: 13 October 2025	
Alfonso López-Chau	17 July 1950 (age 76); Callao	Rector of the National University of Engineering (2021–2025); Member of the Board of Directors of the Central Reserve Bank of Peru (2006–2012)	Lima	Running for: Ahora Nación Announced: 27 July 2024	
Carlos Álvarez	7 January 1964 (age 62); Lima	Comedian	Lima	Running for: Country for All Announced: 28 October 2025	
César Acuña	10 August 1952 (age 74); Chota, Cajamarca	President of Alliance for Progress (2001–present); Governor of La Libertad (2023–2025; 2015); Mayor of Trujillo (2007–2014); Member of the Congress of the Republic (2000–2006); 2021 presidential candidate	La Libertad	Running for: Alliance for Progress Announced: 13 October 2025	
Wolfgang Grozo	21 September 1967 (age 59); Lima	Retired Major General of the Peruvian Air Force; President of Democratic Integrity (2023–present)	Lima	Running for: Democratic Integrity Announced:	
Yonhy Lescano	15 February 1959 (age 67); Puno, Puno	Member of the Congress of the Republic (2001–2019); General Secretary of Popular Action (2009–2011); 2021 presidential candidate	Puno	Running for: Popular Cooperation Announced: 12 September 2024	
Mario Vizcarra	12 July 1954 (age 72); Moquegua, Moquegua	Engineer	Moquegua	Running for: Peru First	
Vladimir Cerrón	16 December 1970 (age 55); Chupaca, Junín	General Secretary of Free Peru (2008–present); Governor of Junín (2011–2014; 2019)	Junín	Running for: Free Peru Announced: 10 August 2024	
José Luna	17 July 1955 (age 71); Huancavelica, Huancavelica	Member of the Congress of the Republic (2021–present; 2000–2016); President of Podemos Perú (2018–present); Third Vice President of the Congress (2012–2014)	Lima	Running for: Podemos Perú	
George Forsyth	20 June 1982 (age 44); Caracas, Venezuela	Mayor of La Victoria (2019–2020); 2021 presidential candidate	Lima	Running for: We Are Peru Announced: 15 October 2025	
Roberto Chiabra	15 July 1949 (age 77); Callao	President of Unity and Peace (2023–present); Member of the Congress of the Republic (2021–present); Minister of Defense (2003–2005); General Commander of the Peruvian Army (2002–2003)	Lima	Running for: National Unity Announced: 12 July 2025	
Enrique Valderrama	14 April 1986 (age 40); Lima	Lawyer and political commentator	Lima	Running for: Peruvian Aprista Party Announced: 19 September 2025	
José Williams	9 November 1951 (age 75); Lima	Member of the Congress of the Republic (2021–present); President of the Congress of the Republic (2022–2023); Chairman of the Joint Command of the Armed Forces (2005–2006)	Lima	Running for: Go on Country Announced: 7 December 2025	
Fiorella Molinelli	20 July 1974 (age 52); Lima	President of Modern Force (2023–present); Executive President of the Health Social Security (2018–2021); Minister of Development and Social Inclusion (2017–2018); Deputy Minister of Housing and Construction (2017); Deputy Minister of Transportation (2016–2017)	Lima	Running for: Force and Liberty Announced: 4 August 2025	
Ricardo Belmont	29 August 1945 (age 81); Lima	President of the OBRAS Civic Party (1989–present); Member of the Congress of the Republic (2009–2011); Mayor of Lima (1990–1995); 1995 presidential candidate	Lima	Running for: OBRAS Civic Party Announced: 16 July 2024	
Fernando Olivera	26 July 1958 (age 68); Lima	President of the Front of Hope 2021 (2020–present); Minister of Foreign Relations (2005); Ambassador to Spain (2002–2005); Minister of Justice (2001–2002); Member of the Congress of the Republic (1995–2001); Member of the Democratic Constituent Congress (1992–1995); Member of the Chamber of Deputies (1985–1992); 2016, and 2001 presidential candidate	Lima	Running for: Front of Hope 2021 Announced: 10 February 2024	
Carlos Espá	31 August 1960 (age 66); Lima	Lawyer and journalist	Lima	Running for: SíCreo Party Announced: 30 March 2025	
Rafael Belaúnde	26 December 1974 (age 51); Lima	Minister of Energy and Mines (2020)	Lima	Running for: People's Liberty Announced: 4 July 2024	
Mesías Guevara	13 June 1963 (age 63); Chiclayo, Lambayeque	President of Popular Action (2014–2023); Governor of Cajamarca (2019–2022); Member of the Congress of the Republic (2011–2016); General Secretary of Popular Action (2007–2009; 2011–2013)	Cajamarca	Running for: Purple Party Announced: 30 October 2025	
Marisol Pérez Tello	11 April 1969 (age 57); Tacna, Tacna	General Secretary of the Christian People's Party (2017–2021); Minister of Justice and Human Rights (2016–2017); Member of the Congress of the Republic (2011–2016)	Lima	Running for: First The People Announced: 16 January 2025	
Jorge Nieto	29 October 1951 (age 75); Arequipa, Arequipa	President of the Party of Good Government (2023–present); Minister of Defense (2016–2018); Minister of Culture (2016)	Lima	Running for: Party of Good Government Announced: 10 July 2024	

==== Other nominees ====
- Paul Jaimes (Progresemos), former General Secretary of the Ministry of Agrarian Development and Irrigation
- Carlos Jaico (Modern Peru), former General Secretary of the Presidency
- Ronald Atencio (Venceremos Electoral Alliance), lawyer
- Álvaro Paz de la Barra (Faith in Peru), former Mayor of La Molina
- Francisco Diez-Canseco (Peru Action), former Member of the Chamber of Deputies
- Alex Gonzales (Democratic Green Party), former Mayor of San Juan de Lurigancho
- Charlie Carrasco (United Peru Democratic Party), lawyer
- Armando Massé (Federal Democratic Party), medical surgeon
- Herbert Caller (Patriotic Party of Peru), naval engineer
- Walter Chirinos (PRIN Political Party), lawyer
- Rosario Fernández Bazán (A Different Path)
- Antonio Ortiz Villano (Let's Save Peru)

=== Disqualified tickets ===
Party	Ticket			Disqualification	
Name	for President	for First Vice President	for Second Vice President	Date	Motive
Citizens for Peru Party; Partido Ciudadanos por el Perú	Morgan Quero	Alberto Moreno	Melania Herrera	8 November 2025	The National Jury of Elections rejected the registration because the presidential candidate joined the party past the 12 July 2024 deadline in order to be eligible to run for President.
Popular Action; Acción Popular	Alfredo Barnechea	Armando Villanueva Mercado	Tania Abad Jaime	13 December 2025	The party's primary election was annulled by the National Jury of Elections due to substantial procedural irregularities, including discrepancies in and manipulation of delegate lists, which the body determined violated core principles of internal party democracy and due process.

=== Tickets defeated in primaries ===
Defeated in primaries
Party/Coalition	For President	For First Vice President	For Second Vice President	Ref.
Popular Action	Víctor Andrés García Belaúnde	Miguel Román	María Nieva	
Popular Action	Julio Chávez	Gisella Narváez	Delia Condo	
Popular Action	Edwin Martínez	Celia Quispe	Carlos Álvarez Rosas	
Popular Action	Higinio Torres	Ricardo Torres	Ana Luyo	
Popular Action	Erwin Pinedo	María Samame	Augusto Bezada	
Peruvian Aprista Party	Jorge del Castillo	Mauricio Mulder	Belén García Mendoza	
Peruvian Aprista Party	Javier Velásquez	Carla García	Luis Wilson	
Peruvian Aprista Party	Hernán Garrido Lecca	Omar Quesada	Olga Cribilleros	
Peruvian Aprista Party	Magno Mendoza	Nemit Gamboa	Elena Ciriaco	
Peruvian Aprista Party	Jorge Morales	Mercedes Núñez	Marcos Javes	
Peruvian Aprista Party	Nery Quiroz	Fidel Puma	José Fernández	
Peruvian Aprista Party	Augusto Valqui	Edmundo Haya de la Torre	Isabel Oviedo	
Peruvian Aprista Party	Yamel Romero	Calle Olivera	José Luis Rodríguez	
Peruvian Aprista Party	Neptali Ramírez	Jorge Cuervo	Milagros Morales	
Peruvian Aprista Party	Rafael Zevallos	Rocío Salcedo	Daniel Díaz	
Peruvian Aprista Party	Emiliano Vargas	Edith Ruelas	Julio Loayza	
Peruvian Aprista Party	José Antonio Torres Iriarte	Orlando Loayza	Fanny Ríos	
Peruvian Aprista Party	Juan Carlos Sánchez Montes de Oca	Valeria Mezarina	Fidel Buitrón	
Purple Party	Richard Arce	Ronnie Jurado	Frida Ríos	
Purple Party	Manuel Quiroz	Olga Tejada	Rolando Calderón	
PRIN Political Party	Liliana Humala	Marco Lara	Fernando Grández	
Modern Peru	Reynaldo López	Guilmar Trujillo	Zully Pinchi	
First The People	Miguel del Castillo	Luis Machicao	Rocío Pizarro	
First The People	Carlos Oré	Luz Gamboa	Daniel Chávez	
Let's Save Peru	Mariano González	Mariano Portugal	Katherine Ramírez	
Let's Save Peru	David Mamani	Manuel Mendives	Rocío Juloca	
Let's Save Peru	Ricardo Vásquez	Edelmira Ramírez	Luis Vargas	
Venceremos Electoral Alliance	Vicente Alanoca	Gustavo Guerra García	Dalia Abarca	

=== Declined ===
- Francisco Sagasti (Purple Party), former President of Peru
- Verónika Mendoza (New Peru), former Member of Congress
- Carla García (Peruvian Aprista Party), communicator and writer. Declined in order to run as running mate of Javier Velásquez in the primary election.

=== Former ===
- Alberto Fujimori (Popular Force), former President of Peru. Died on 11 September 2024.
- Carlos Añaños (Modern Peru), businessman and founder of Ajegroup. Ineligible to run in the presidential election due to resignation from party membership after the registration deadline.
- Antauro Humala (ANTAURO), leader of Ethnocacerism. Party disqualified on 31 October 2024 by the Supreme Court of Peru.
- Rómulo Mucho Mamani (Modern Peru), former Minister of Energy and Mines. Ineligible to run in the presidential election due to resignation from party membership after the registration deadline.
- Susel Paredes (First The People – Community, Ecology, Liberty, and Progress), Member of Congress. Ineligible to run in the presidential election due to resignation from party membership after the registration deadline.
- Fernando Cillóniz (Christian People's Party), former Governor of Ica. Party ended candidacy in the aftermath of an interview in which the candidate revealed ties to Odebrecht.
- Javier González Olaechea (Christian People's Party), former Minister of Foreign Relations. Ineligible to run in presidential election due to resignation from party membership after the registration deadline.
- Guido Bellido (Conscience People), former Prime Minister of Peru. Party failed to register with the National Jury of Elections on time to qualify for the general election.
- Aníbal Torres (Forward United People), former Prime Minister of Peru Party failed to register with the National Jury of Elections on time to qualify for the general election.
- Duberlí Rodríguez (Popular Unity), former Chief Justice of Peru Party failed to register with the National Jury of Elections on time to qualify for the general election.
- Ciro Gálvez (National United Resurgence), former Minister of Culture Party failed to register with the National Jury of Elections on time to qualify for the general election.
- Óscar Valdés (Christian People's Party), former Prime Minister of Peru Ineligible to run in the presidential election due to resignation from party membership after the registration deadline.
- Hernando de Soto (Progresemos), economist and former 2021 presidential candidate. Ineligible to run in the presidential election due to resignation from party membership after the registration deadline.
- Carlos Neuhaus (Christian People's Party), former Chairman of the 2019 Pan American Games Organizing Committee. Party chose Roberto Chiabra as presidential nominee in coalition with the Unity and Peace Party.
- Zósimo Cárdenas (Battle Peru), Governor of Junín. Party coalesced with Modern Force's Fiorella Molinelli as presidential nominee.
- Carlos Anderson (Modern Peru), Member of Congress. Ineligible to run in the presidential election due to resignation from party membership after the registration deadline.
- Pedro Guevara (Modern Peru), architect and consultant. Ineligible to run in the presidential election due to resignation from party membership after the registration deadline.
- Arturo Fernández Bazán (A Different Path), former Mayor of Trujillo. Sentenced to one year and eight months in prison for defamation by the Judiciary.
- Guillermo Bermejo (People's Voices), Member of Congress. Sentenced to fifteen years in prison for terrorism affiliation by the Judiciary.
- Phillip Butters (Go on Country – Social Integration Party), journalist and TV host. Ineligible to run in the presidential election due to resignation from party membership after the registration deadline.
- Napoleón Becerra (Workers and Entrepreneurs Party), municipal union leader. He died in a car accident on 15 March 2026.
