= 2025 Peruvian Aprista Party presidential primary =

- 30 November 2025

43,672
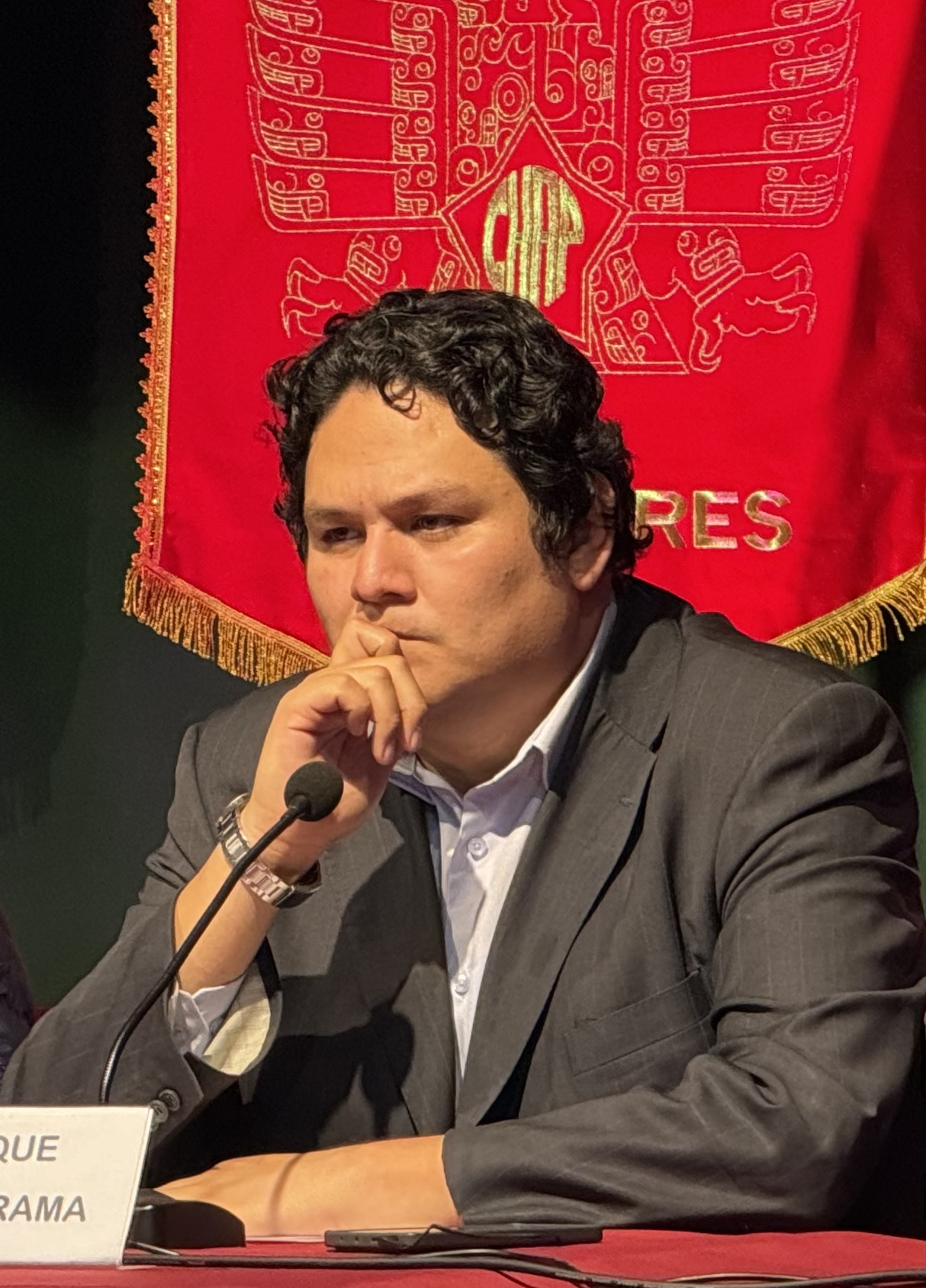

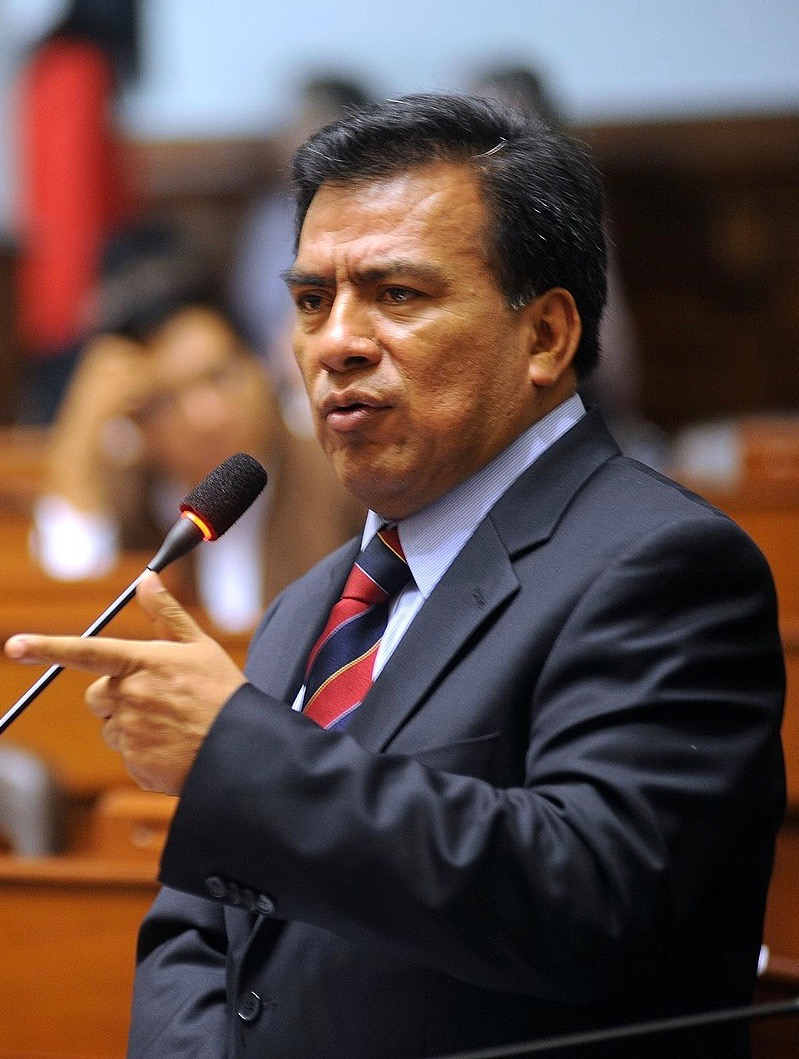

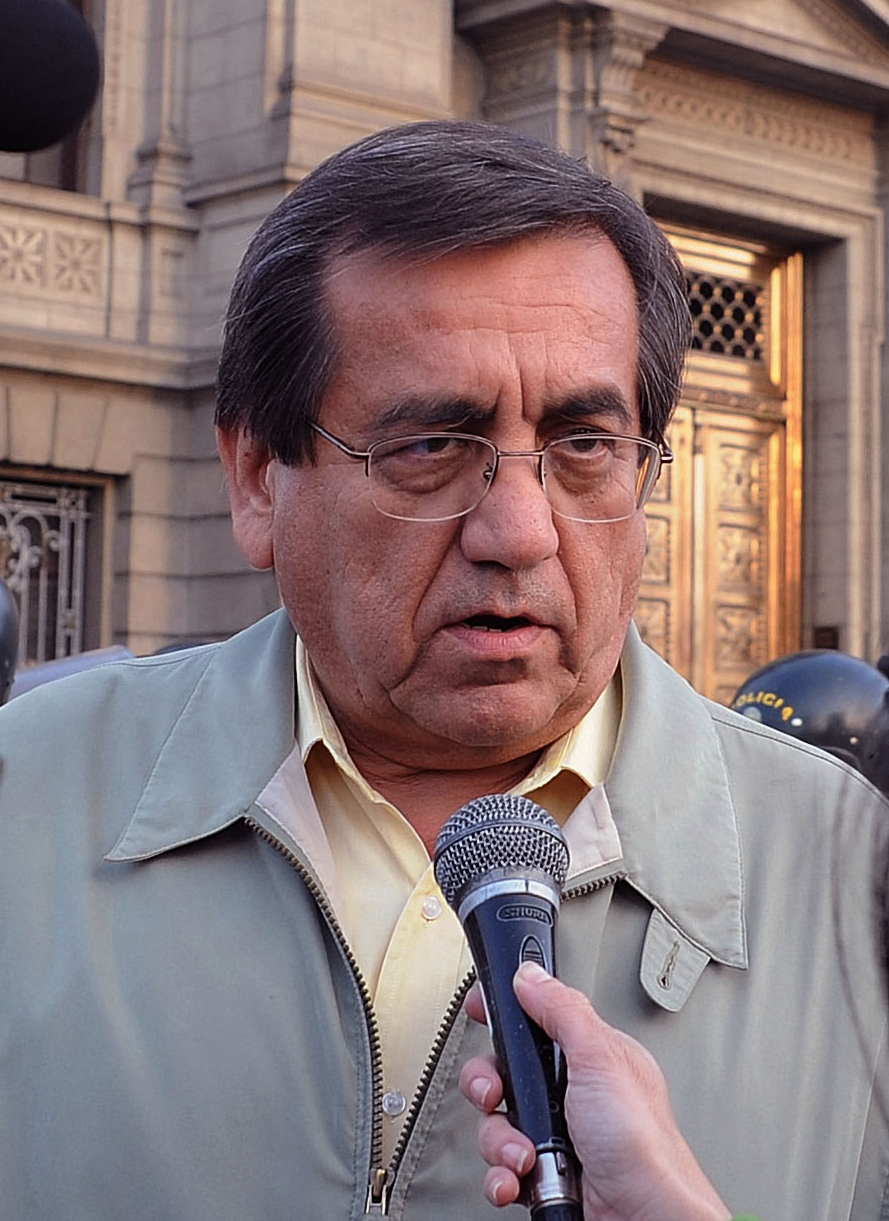

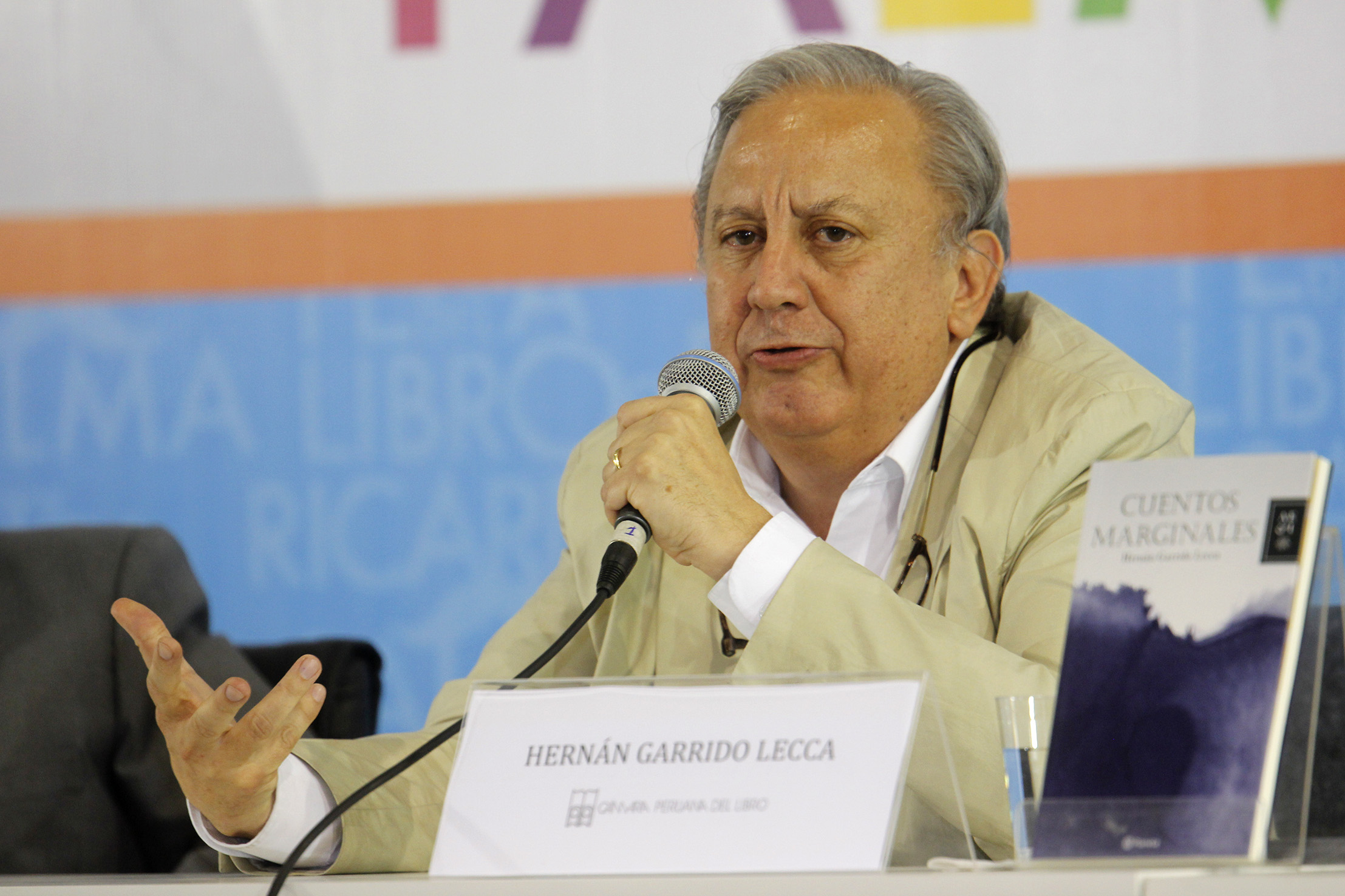
Candidate	Enrique Valderrama	Javier Velásquez	Jorge del Castillo
Home state	Lima	Lambayeque	Lima
Popular vote	3,779	3,581	3,402
Percentage	25.80%	24.50%	23.28%
Candidate	Hernán Garrido Lecca	Juan Carlos Sánchez Montes de Oca
Home state	Lima	Lima
Popular vote	2,370	381
Percentage	16.22%	2.61%
Previous APRA nominee
Nidia Vílchez
APRA nominee
Enrique Valderrama

On 30 November 2025, members of the Peruvian Aprista Party chose a presidential ticket for the 2026 presidential election.

Of all the 39 political organizations (including electoral alliances) participating of the general election, only the Peruvian Aprista Party and Popular Renewal opted for direct election of nominees for President, Vice President, Senators, and members of Chamber of Deputies. The rest used the indirect method through delegates.

In the primary election held on 30 November 2025 contested by a record of 14 candidates, party newcomer Enrique Valderrama narrowly secured the party’s presidential nomination, receiving 3,779 votes (25.80%), a lead of 198 votes over former Prime Minister Javier Velásquez, who obtained 3,581 votes (24.50%) and followed by another former Prime Minister, Jorge del Castillo with 3,402 votes (23.28%). Another former cabinet minister, Hernán Garrido Lecca, placed fourth in the primary, obtaining 2,370 votes (16.22%); other minor candidates obtained less than 400 votes.

The result was widely regarded by outside observers as a major upset, as several more experienced contenders had been considered the favourites due to their longer political trajectories and established internal alliances.

== Election background ==
After decades as one of Peru’s oldest and historically significant political parties, the Peruvian Aprista Party (APRA) entered a period of decline in the 2010s and early 2020s. Following the 2016 general election, in which longtime leader Alan García finished fifth and subsequently resigned as party president, the party struggled to maintain electoral relevance and internal cohesion. APRA’s performance continued to falter in the 2020 congressional snap election, where it received only about 2.7 % of the vote—failing to surpass the electoral threshold required for congressional representation after 25 years of continuous presence in the legislature.

For the 2021 general election, APRA initially nominated Nidia Vílchez as its presidential candidate. However, after the Special Electoral Jury (JEE) rejected the party’s congressional lists, the party withdrew Vílchez’s candidacy and ultimately did not participate in the election. This absence from the ballot lost the party's official registration with the National Jury of Elections (JNE), a situation that echoed challenges faced by other parties that failed to meet participation and vote-share requirements.

The death of García by suicide in April 2019 removed a central figure in APRA’s leadership and accelerated efforts by various factions within the party to assert control. In the years that followed, the party experienced internal disputes and organizational setbacks, including the removal of thousands of registered members from the party roster due to procedural irregularities related to its legal representation before the JNE. These developments highlighted ongoing struggles within APRA over leadership and the party’s direction ahead of the 2026 general election.

== Candidates ==
=== Nominee ===
Candidate	Experience	Home department	Campaign	Popular vote	Running mates
Enrique Valderrama Peña	Journalist and political commentator	Lima	Secured nomination: 30 November 2025	3,779 (25.85%)	First Vice President; María Inés Valdivia Acuña Second Vice President; Lucio Antonio Vásquez Sánchez

=== Defeated in the primary ===
Candidate	Experience	Home department	Popular vote	Running mates
Javier Velásquez Quesquén	Prime Minister of Peru (2009–2010); President of Congress (2008–2009); Member of Congress (1995–2000; 2001–2019)	Lambayeque	3,581 (24.50%)	First Vice President; Carla García Buscaglia Second Vice President; Luis Wilson Ugarte
Jorge del Castillo Gálvez	Prime Minister of Peru (2006–2008); Member of Congress (1995–2011; 2016–2019); Member of the Chamber of Deputies (1990–1992); Mayor of Lima (1987–1989); Mayor of Barranco (1984–1986); Member of the Barranco District Council (1981–1983)	Lima	3,402 (23.28%)	First Vice President; Mauricio Mulder Bedoya Second Vice President; Belén García Mendoza
Hernán Garrido Lecca Montáñez	Minister of Health (2007–2008); Minister of Housing, Construction and Sanitation (2006–2007)	Lima	2,370 (16.22%)	First Vice President; Omar Quesada Martínez Second Vice President; Olga Cribilleros Shigihara
Juan Carlos Sánchez Montes de Oca	Nominee for the Congress of the Republic from Lima Metropolitan Area (2016)	Lima	381 (2.61%)	First Vice President; Valeria Mezarina Avia Second Vice President; Fidel Buitrón Espinoza
Neptalí Ramírez Herrera	Mayor of Víctor Larco Herrera (1993–1995)	La Libertad	348 (2.38%)	First Vice President; Jorge Cuervo Larrea Second Vice President; Milagros Morales Yauri
Yamel Romero Peralta	Mayor of Arequipa (2003–2006)	Arequipa	317 (2.17%)	First Vice President; Aura Lucía Calle Olivera Second Vice President; José Luis Rodríguez Casaperalta
Rafael Zevallos Bueno	Chemist and author	Lima	185 (1.26%)	First Vice President; Aura Lucía Calle Olivera Second Vice President; Daniel Díaz Espinoza
Augusto Valqui Malpica	Minister of Transportation and Communications (1990; 2020)	Lima	68 (0.47%)	First Vice President; Edmundo Haya de la Torre Barr Second Vice President; Isabel Oviedo Trujillo

=== Results ===
Candidate	Votes	%
List No. 1 (Romero-Calle-Rodríguez)	317	1.95
List No. 2 (Garrido Lecca-Quesada-Cribilleros)	2,370	14.55
List No. 3 (Del Castillo-Mulder-García)	3,402	20.88
List No. 4 (Mendoza-Gamboa-Ciriaco)	62	0.38
List No. 5 (Valqui-Haya de la Torre-Oviedo)	68	0.42
List No. 6 (Zevallos-Salcedo-Díaz)	185	1.14
List No. 7 (Valderrama-Valdivia-Vásquez)	3,779	23.20
List No. 8 (Torres-Loayza-Ríos)	26	0.16
List No. 9 (Quiroz-Puma-Fernández)	28	0.17
List No. 10 (Morales-Núñez-Javes)	23	0.14
List No. 11 (Ramírez-Cuervo-Morales)	348	2.14
List No. 12 (Sánchez-Mezarina-Buitrón)	381	2.34
List No. 13 (Velásquez-García-Wilson)	3,581	21.98
List No. 14 (Vargas-Ruelas-Loayza)	46	0.28
Blank Votes	1,312	8.05
Void	363	2.23
Total	16,291	100.00
Source: ONPE

== See also ==
- 2026 Peruvian general election
- American Popular Revolutionary Alliance
