= Carlos Arana =

Peruvian engineer, public administrator and politician

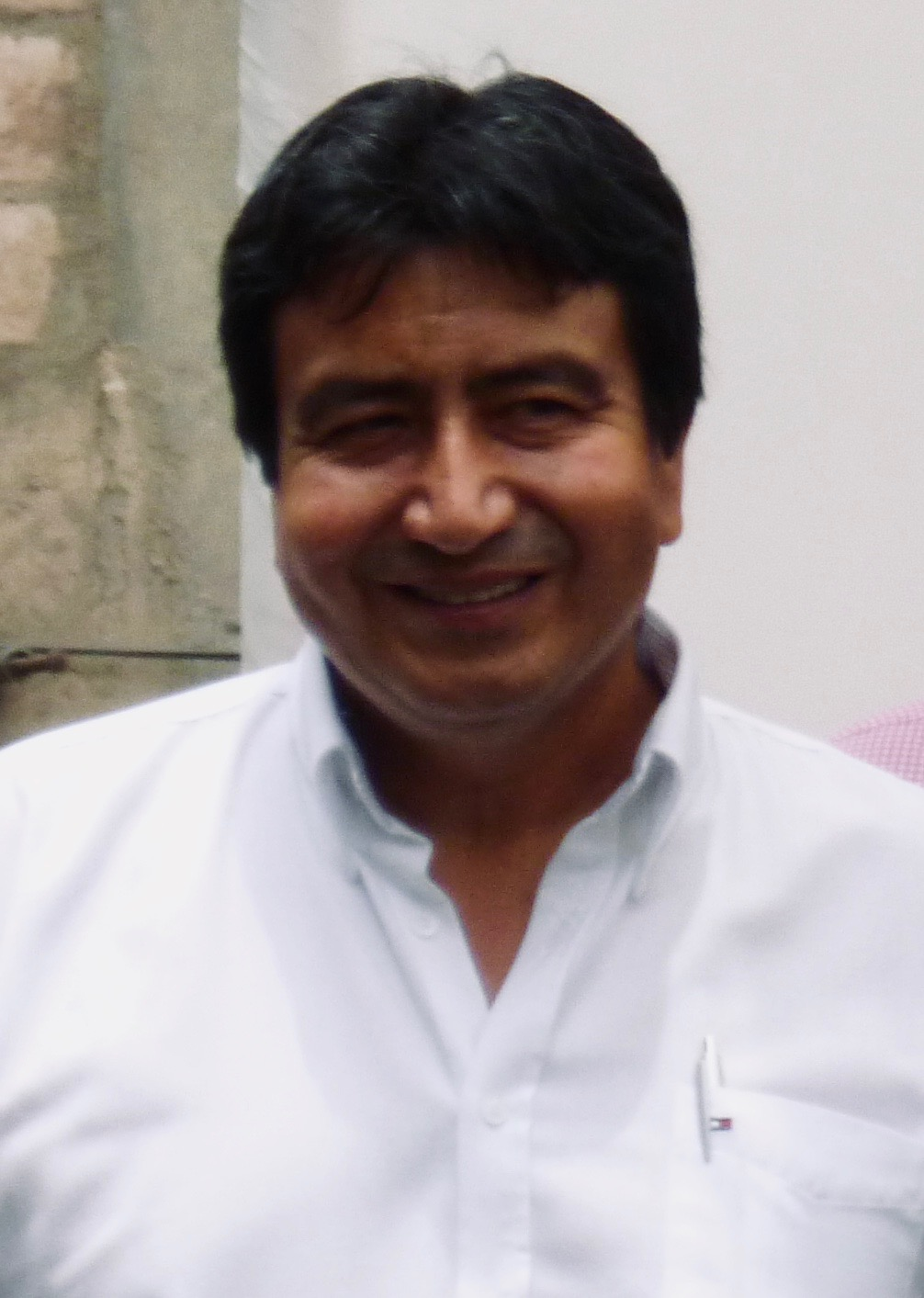

Secretary of Organization and Mobilization of the Peruvian Aprista Party
- In office March 5, 2010 – July 8, 2017
- President: Alan García
- Preceded by: Wilbert Bendezú
- Succeeded by: Miguel Rosas

Director of the National Fund for Social Development Cooperation Ministry of Women and Social Development
- In office August 8, 2008 – January 3, 2011
- President: Alan García
- Minister: Susana Pinilla; Carmen Vildoso; Nidia Vílchez; Virginia Borra Toledo
- Preceded by: Miguel Rosas
- Succeeded by: Carlota Huaroto Munárez

Deputy Minister of Construction and Sanitation
- In office August 2, 2006 – August 4, 2006
- President: Alan García
- Prime Minister: Jorge Del Castillo
- Minister: Hernán Garrido Lecca
- Preceded by: Vacant
- Succeeded by: Juan Sarmiento Soto

Personal details
- Born: January 22, 1962 (age 64) Lima, Peru
- Party: Peruvian Aprista Party
- Education: National University of Engineering (BA)
- Occupation: Public administrator
- Profession: Civil engineer

Carlos Gerardo Arana Vivar (born January 22, 1962) is a Peruvian engineer, public administrator and politician. A ranking member of the Peruvian Aprista Party, he served in a variety of technical positions in the second presidency of Alan García, most notably as Director of the National Fund for Social Development Cooperation, from 2008 to 2011.

A controversial figure associated with Alan García's inner circle in the party leadership, he served as the party's Secretary of Organization and Mobilization in three occasions, most recently from 2010 to 2017. At the 2011 general election, Arana ran for a seat in the Peruvian Congress, but was not elected due to the low share of votes the party received nationally. He remains an influential member of the leadership.

== Early life and education ==
Born in the Jesús María District of Lima on January 22, 1962, his family moved to the middle to-lower class district of Breña. Upon culminating his high school education at the Diez de Octubre School, he was admitted to the National University of Engineering, where he graduated with a bachelor's degree in Civil engineering. Simultaneously, he took courses in Business Administration at ESAN University.

== Political career ==
At a very young age, he registered in the Peruvian Aprista Party. He quickly rose up in the ranks of the party as Secretary of Organization in April 1992. He rescinded from the position in October 1994, but was chosen once again in March 1995, serving until 1999. During these years, the party struggled in opposition to Alberto Fujimori's government, underperforming in the 1995 general election and municipal elections of 1996 and 1998. Although he was not ratified in the position in 1999 national convention, he continued to rank in the party as a member of the Executive Committee led by Secretary General, Agustín Mantilla.

In Alan García's first administration, Arana was chosen as Governor-General to the Pueblo Libre District in 1986, serving in the position through December 1989. Simultaneously, he served as Deputy Manager of the Drinking Water and Sewerage Service of Lima (SEDAPAL), appointed June 1986. In January 1990, he was appointed director of the Bank of Housing, an agency dependent of the Ministry of Housing. He was not ratified in the position in the newly inaugurated Alberto Fujimori administration in July, resigning in August 1990. He continued managing SEDAPAL until January 1993. Subsequently, he was chosen to serve as Advisor to the Mayor of Ica, from August 1993 to July 1996.

In Alan García's second administration, Arana was appointed Head of the "Water for All" National Program, serving in the position from February 2007 to June 2007. At the same time, he also served as Advisor to the Minister of Housing, from November 2006 to March 2007.

Arana's profile would come into question when he was appointed Director of the National Fund for Social Development Cooperation (FONCODES), an agency dependent of the Ministry of Women and Social Development, on August 8, 2008. His appointment remained controversial and received widespread media attention, associating him with Agustín Mantilla's inner circle in his youth. It was revealed that Arana had been appointed Deputy Minister of Construction and Sanitation, lasting in office two days after as it was discovered that he had an administrative process in the Higher Council for State Contracting and Acquisitions (Consucode), because the company Corporación Constructiva SA, legally represented by Arana, presented false documentation to renew the registration as Executor of Works, and thus continue participating in tenders called by the State.

At FONCODES, Arana led numerous projects in social development in collaboration with minister Nidia Vílchez. After more than two years in office, he resigned in order to run for Congress with the Peruvian Aprista Party in the Lima constituency at the 2011 general election. Although he attained a high number of votes, he was not elected, as the party was only able to win 4 seats at national level, mostly from Lima. Before his failed congressional bid, he was considered as a potential party nominee for Mayor of Lima at the 2010 general election, but the metropolitan convention ultimately selected Carlos Roca Cáceres.

At the 2010 party national convention, Arana was elected Secretary of Organization and Mobilization for a record-third time, serving at the same time as a member of the Political Commission chaired by former Prime Minister of Peru and congressman, Javier Velásquez. In his seven-year tenure, he participated as one of the main campaign heads for Alan García's 2016 presidential bid with the Popular Alliance ticket. He retired from the party leadership after the 2017 national convention elected his successor, Miguel Rosas, his predecessor at FONCODES.
