= Port of Callao =

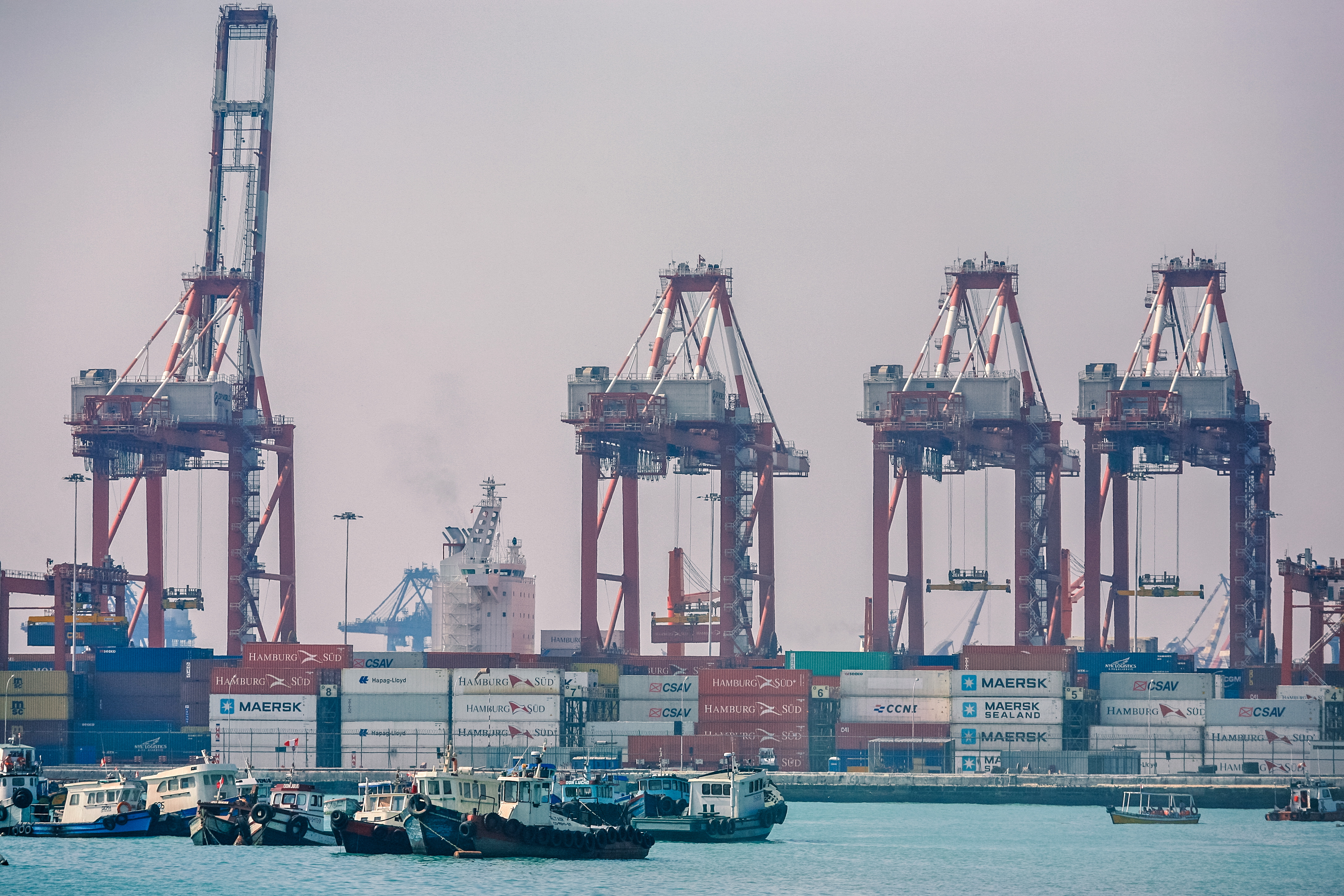
- Interactive map of Port of Callao

Location
- Country: Peru
- Location: Callao

Details
- Operated by: DP World Callao, APM Terminals, Transportadora Callao

The Port of Callao (Spanish: Puerto del Callao), officially the Callao Port Terminal (Spanish: Terminal Portuario del Callao), is the maritime port of Callao, a suburb of Lima, Peru.

It is the country's main port in terms of traffic and storage capacity. Likewise, it is one of the most important in Latin America, ranking seventh and first in the South Pacific region in 2015. In 2018, the port movement in the port of Callao was 2,340,657 TEU, ranking 6th in the list of port activity in Latin America and the Caribbean.

It has a depth of up to 16 meters (52 ft), which allows it to receive ships carrying up to 15,000 TEUs, it has three concessions which respond to the APN (National Port Authority) that are in charge of Dubai Ports World (South Dock) and APM Terminals (North Pier), and Transportadora Callao S.A. As of 2023, two expansion projects target the northern and southern ports.

The port also hosts the Naval Museum (Spanish: Museo Naval), which opened in 1958.

== Infrastructure ==
The port infrastructure has improved in recent years due to different investments that have been made as a result of the concessions. In Callao there are five piers (1, 2, 3, 4 and North), which are direct mooring, breakwater type. The first four piers have exactly the same characteristics: 182.8 meters (600 ft) per side. Two piers are 30 meters (98 ft) wide and the other two are 86. There are two berths per pier, between 31 and 34 feet deep and 182.8 meters (600 ft) long. In addition, the North pier has four berths, with a depth of between 34 and 36 feet. Each berth is between 20 and 30 meters long. The docks are specialized for containers, bulk and multipurpose.

There are eleven storage facilities from different areas. There are four container zones, and five container yards. Additionally, there is a closed warehouse specialized in grains. There are two ZPMC gantry cranes and six panamax, as well as two dock cranes. There are about 4 movers, 22 terminal trucks, and 10 elevators, with different load capacities (2.3, 3.2, 5.5, and 30 tons).

== Concessions ==
The North Dock is under concession to APM Terminals, a company that won the public concession tender in April 2011. Another of the docks (South Dock) is controlled by DP World Callao, a subsidiary of Dubai Ports World, which began its operations in May 2010. The downtown dock is under concession to Consorcio Transportadora Callao.

== Statistics ==
As ENAPU states, the Callao Port Terminal had a 79.1% participation in cargo during 2000, where the most important thing was the flow of merchandise in the export items of fishmeal, minerals, lead, zinc, agro-industrial products and the import of corn, wheat, rice, spare parts and machinery for Peruvian production.

The port of Callao has been increasing its container traffic. In this sense, this growing trend was only stopped, momentarily, by the economic crisis of 2008. Most of this growth has been the product of new exports from the country and the consequent demand for inputs from abroad. In this sense, although El Callao remains an importing port, it maintains a significant portion of container exports.

Regarding cargo statistics, exports far exceed imports. This is mainly due to the mining and agricultural drive. During 2010 cargo traffic was 17.4 million metric tons, of which about 10.3 million were for export.

== Museum ==
Naval Museum of Peru
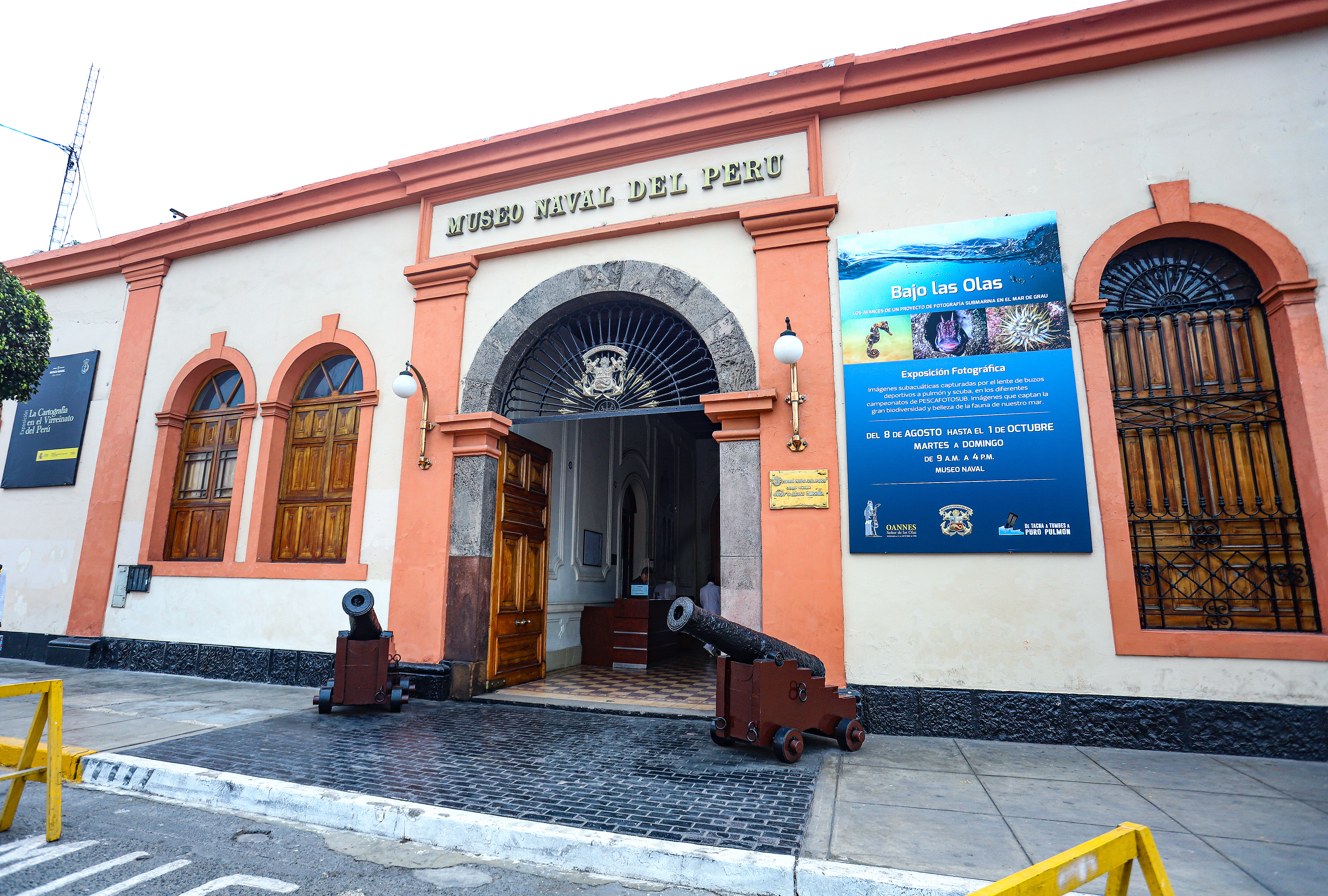
- Established: 13 November 1958
- Location: Avenida Jorge Chávez 123
- Owner: Peruvian Navy

The Naval Museum of Peru (Spanish: Museo Naval del Perú "Capitán de Navío Julio José Elías Murguía") is a naval museum located in the central part of the city of Callao. It is administered by the Peruvian Navy. The museum is mainly dedicated to the maritime history of Peru. It is named after its first director, Navy Captain Julio José Elías Murguía.

It was created on 13 November 1958 by Supreme Resolution and began activities on 18 July 1962.

It has 10 exhibition halls, highlighting the Viceroyalty Hall, the Republican Navy Hall and the Guano and Saltpeter War. Among the objects in the collection is the figurehead of the ship Nuestra Señora del Triunfo and the cannon of the Chilean schooner Covadonga.

== Sister ports ==
- Chile: the Port of Valparaíso is twinned since 29 November 2002.
- Uruguay: the Port of Montevideo is twinned since 25 January 2011.

== See also ==
- DP World
- Constitutional Province of Callao
- Ferrocarril Central Andino
- San Lorenzo Megaport Project
- Callao Naval Base
