= 2020 Peruvian Aprista Party presidential primary =

- 29 November 2020

210,540
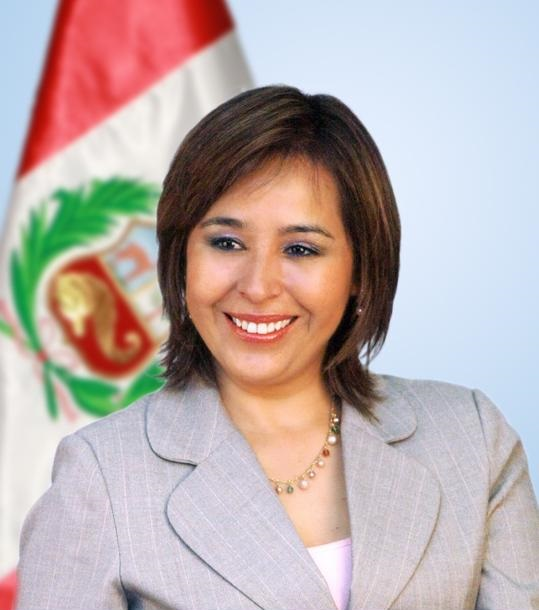
Candidate	Nidia Vílchez	Juan Carlos Sánchez Montes de Oca
Home state	Junín	Lima
Popular vote	8,443	2,478
Percentage	72.37%	21.24%
Candidate	Rafael Zevallos
Home state	Lima
Popular vote	745
Percentage	6.39%
Previous APRA nominee
Alan García
APRA nominee
Nidia Vílchez

On 29 November 2020, members of the Peruvian Aprista Party chose a presidential ticket for the 2021 presidential election.

The party elected former cabinet minister Nidia Vílchez as the presidential nominee, defeating by a large margin the two other candidates, alongside her running mates Iván Hidalgo, former deputy minister of Social Development, and Olga Cribilleros, former member of Congress from La Libertad.

Subsequently, the party withdrew her nomination once registered as a candidate at the National Jury of Elections after the party was denied registering their congressional candidates past the deadline.

== Candidates ==
=== Nominee ===
Candidate	Experience	Home department	Campaign	Popular vote	Running mates
Nidia Vílchez Yucra	Minister of Women and Social Development (2009–2010); Minister of Housing, Construction and Sanitation (2008–2009); Member of Congress (2006–2011)	Junín	Secured nomination: 29 November 2020	8,443 (72.37%)	First Vice President; Hildebrando Iván Hidalgo Romero Second Vice President; Olga Amelia Cribilleros Shigihara

=== Defeated in the primary ===
Candidate	Experience	Home department	Popular vote	Running mates
Juan Carlos Sánchez Montes de Oca	Former nominee for the Congress of the Republic from Lima Metropolitan Area (2016)	Lima	2,478 (21.24%)	First Vice President; Nora María Rodríguez Herencia Second Vice President; Celso Jesús Chinchay Obregón
Rafael Zevallos Bueno	Chemist and author	Lima	745 (6.39%)	First Vice President; Rocío del Pilar Salcedo Silva Second Vice President; Dante Luis Tello Cruzado

=== Total ===
Candidate	Votes	%
List No. 1 (Vílchez-Hidalgo-Cribilleros)	8,443	59.37
List No. 2 (Sánchez Montes de Oca-Rodríguez-Chinchay)	2,478	17.43
List No. 3 (Zevallos-Salcedo-Tello)	745	5.24
Blank Votes	1,820	12.80
Void	734	5.16
Total	14,220	100.00
Source: ONPE

== See also ==
- 2021 Peruvian general election
- American Popular Revolutionary Alliance
