= Juan Sarmiento Soto =

Minister of Housing, Construction and Sanitation
- In office 29 September 2009 – 28 July 2011
- President: Alan García
- Prime Minister: Javier Velásquez; José Antonio Chang; Rosario Fernández
- Preceded by: Francis Allison
- Succeeded by: Rene Cornejo

Deputy Minister of Construction and Sanitation
- In office 4 August 2006 – 29 September 2009
- President: Alan García
- Prime Minister: Jorge Del Castillo; Yehude Simon
- Minister: Hernán Garrido Lecca; Enrique Cornejo; Nidia Vílchez; Francis Allison
- Preceded by: Carlos Arana
- Succeeded by: David Alfonso Ramos López

Deputy Minister of Housing and Construction
- In office 2 August 1985 – 28 July 1990
- President: Alan García
- Prime Minister: Luis Alva Castro; Guillermo Larco Cox; Armando Villanueva; Luis Alberto Sánchez
- Minister: Luis Bedoya Vélez; Antenor Orrego Spelucín

Personal details
- Born: 13 November 1941 Lima, Peru
- Died: 7 April 2015 (aged 73) Lima, Peru
- Party: Peruvian Aprista Party
- Education: National University of Engineering (BA)
- Occupation: Civil engineer
- Profession: Public administrator

Juan Sarmiento Soto (13 November 1941 – 7 April 2015) was a Peruvian engineer and public administrator who served as Minister of Housing, Construction and Sanitation under President Alan García from September 2009 to July 2011.

== Biography ==
Juan Sarmiento Soto is a Civil engineer. He was appointed as the Deputy Minister of Housing, Construction, and Sanitation in August 2006, and became full Minister in September 2009, serving through the end of the Second presidency of Alan García in July 2011. Previously, he served in the same ministry as Deputy Minister of Housing and Construction in the entire administration of the First presidency of Alan García.

He is a member of the Peruvian Aprista Party. From 2004 to 2007, he served as Director of Transport and Communications in the National Executive Committee. Additionally, he served as an advisor in the elaboration of the 2006-2011 Government Plan.
