= Miguel Rosas =

Peruvian lawyer and public administrator

National Secretary of Organization and Mobilization of the Peruvian Aprista Party
- In office 8 July 2017 – 29 October 2019
- President: Alan García (until 12 March 2018)
- Preceded by: Carlos Arana
- Succeeded by: Enrique Melgar Moscoso

Director of the National Fund for Social Development Cooperation Ministry of Women and Social Development
- In office May 29, 2008 – August 7, 2008
- President: Alan García
- Minister: Susana Pinilla
- Preceded by: Frank Martín Tadeo Castro Barcenas
- Succeeded by: Carlos Arana

Personal details
- Born: 6 January 1958 (age 68) Lambayeque, Lambayeque, Peru
- Party: Peruvian Aprista Party
- Education: Federico Villarreal National University (LLB)
- Occupation: Public administrator
- Profession: Lawyer

Miguel de los Reyes Rosas Silva (born January 6, 1958) is a Peruvian lawyer and public administrator. A ranking member of the Peruvian Aprista Party, he served in a variety of positions in the second administration of Alan García, most notably as Director of the National Fund for Social Development Cooperation, an agency dependent of the Ministry of Women and Social Development in 2008.

== Early life and education ==
Rosas was born in the northern region of Lambayeque on January 6, 1958. During his high school education in Chiclayo, he enrolled in the Peruvian Aprista Party's youth wing, the Juventud Aprista Peruana (JAP), participating extensively in a variety of leadership roles in the organization. After finishing his high school education, he moved to Lima, enrolling in the Federico Villarreal National University, graduating with a law degree.

== Political career ==
In Lima, he resided in the San Miguel District, where he continued as a member of the Juventud Aprista Peruana, serving as Secretary of International Affairs of the youth wing from May 1983 to August 1985. During the first presidency of Alan García, he served as a political operative to Miguel Facundo Chinguel, future Presidential Pardons Commission Chairman, serving as his private assistant when Facundo worked as Legal Advisor at the Municipality of Lima.

Subsequently, he assumed the position of Secretary of Propaganda for the San Miguel District Party Committee in August 1992. After leaving the position in September 1996, he was promoted as Deputy Secretary of Propaganda at national level in the Executive Committee. He served through March 2004, taking a prominent role in Alan García's presidential campaign for the 2001 general election. The 2004 national convention elected him Ecology and Environment National Director for the party. He was not ratified in the 2010 national convention.

=== Government career ===
At government level, Rosas was appointed to the Ministry of Agriculture in the second presidency of Alan García, in the position of General Manager of the National Institute of Natural Resources (INRENA), serving from September 2006 to January 2008. He was rotated in the administration to Coordinator of the Ministry of Transport and Communications. After a brief stint at the Ministry, he was appointed Director of the National Fund for Social Development Cooperation (FONCODES) in May 2008, serving through August 2008, being replaced by fellow party member, Carlos Arana.

Rosas was reappointed to the Ministry of Agriculture as Director-General of Forestry and Fauna Wildlife of the Ministry of Agriculture, upon the resignation of Gustavo Suárez de Freitas in August 2009.

=== 2011 elections ===
He resigned from the Ministry of Agriculture as Director-General of Forestry and Fauna Wildlife of the Ministry of Agriculture October 2010, in order to run for a seat in the Andean Parliament at the 2011 general election with the Peruvian Aprista Party. Although he was not elected, he attained a high number of votes behind frontrunner Luis Nava Guibert.

=== 2016 elections ===
At the 2016 general election, Rosas was selected to run for Congress with the Popular Alliance congressional list, which included in the coalition the Peruvian Aprista Party. He attained a low share of votes and was not elected.
