= Justicia para Alan =

- Theatrical release poster
- Directed by: Ernesto Carlín
- Written by: Ernesto Carlín
- Produced by: Hernán Garrido Lecca
- Cinematography: Oliver Gabriel González León
- Edited by: Oliver Gabriel González León
- Release dates: February 18, 2023 (private function); April 20, 2023 (Peru)
- Running time: 100 minutes
- Country: Peru
- Language: Spanish

Justicia para Alan (lit. 'Justice for Alan') is a 2023 Peruvian documentary film written and directed by Ernesto Carlín. The film narrates the last months of the life of twice democratically elected president Alan García Pérez and analyzes the circumstances of his suicide. The film didn't have financing from the Peruvian State.

== Synopsis ==
The film narrates and analyzes the last months of the life of President Alan García Pérez. It contains statements by the former Heads of State Rafael Correa (Ecuador), Álvaro Uribe (Colombia) and two ex-governors Julio María Sanguinetti and José Mujica (Uruguay), in addition to interviews with people close to the former APRA president.

== Release ==
The film had a private screening on February 18, 2023, as part of the Peruvian Aprista Party's festivities for Fraternity Month. It was commercially released on April 20, 2023 in Peruvian theaters.

== Controversy ==
After the trailer was released on October 22, 2022, the director Ernesto Carlín pronounced that he received death threats, and that when he tried to file a complaint at a police station in Miraflores, they ignored him.
