= 1214: No tememos a los cobardes =

- Film poster
- Directed by: Ernesto Carlín; Hernán Hurtado
- Written by: Ernesto Carlín; Hernán Hurtado
- Produced by: Hernán Garrido Lecca
- Edited by: Oliver Gonzalez Leon
- Music by: Cucho Galarza
- Release date: July 24, 2021
- Running time: 70 minutes
- Country: Peru
- Language: Spanish

1214: No tememos a los cobardes (lit. '1214: We don't fear cowards') is a 2021 Peruvian documentary film written and directed by Ernesto Carlín and Hernán Hurtado in their directorial debut. It is about the victims (1214) of the Aprista political party in the dark period of terror and death of the 80s by Shining Path.

== Synopsis ==
5 true stories are told about characters who were not intimidated by the threats of the terrorists and who continued to defend the message of Pan con Libertad from Haya de la Torre's party. They are dramas that took place in inland places like Ayacucho and Huancavelica or Lima districts like La Victoria, El Agustino or Surco.

== Release ==
It premiered on July 24, 2021, at the Aprista party venue, in Breña. Subsequently, the film was donated to the Chilean Museum of Memory and Human Rights for distribution in Chilean territory.
