= National Port Authority (Peru) =

- Autoridad Portuaria Nacional

Government agency overview
- Formed: 2003
- Superseding Government agency: Ministry of Transport and Communications
- Headquarters: Av. Santa Rosa 135, La Perla, Callao
- Website: www.apn.gob.pe

The National Port Authority (Spanish: Autoridad Portuaria Nacional, APN) is a specialized technical body that promotes the development of ports in the Republic of Peru. It is attached to the Ministry of Transport and Communications. It was created in 2003.

== Headquarters ==
It is based in Callao. It has 10 decentralized offices: Paita – Bayóvar, Salaverry, Callao, Pisco, San Nicolás, Matarani, Ilo, Iquitos, Yurimaguas and Pucallpa; and 7 annexes: Zorritos, Talara, Eten, Supe - Huacho - Chancay, Nauta, Santa Rosa and Puno.

== See also ==
- Politics of Peru
- Government of Peru
