= Rafael Zevallos =

Peruvian chemist, author and politician

Rafael Jerko Zevallos Bueno (born 4 April 1973) is a Peruvian chemist, author, and politician. He holds a chemistry degree from the National University of San Marcos.

A member of the Peruvian Aprista Party since 1998 and of its National Executive Committee from 2010 to 2017, Zevallos announced his candidacy for President of Peru in the 2021 Peruvian general election in September 2020. In the primary election held on 29 November 2020, he faced former Minister of Women and Social Development, Nidia Vílchez, and former congressional nominee, Juan Carlos Sánchez Montes de Oca, for the APRA presidential nomination. He eventually placed third with 745 votes at national level. He ran for a second time for the party's presidential nomination for the 2026 general election. He placed eighth in the primary election by attaining 1.3% of the members’ vote, losing to newcomer Enrique Valderrama.

Zevallos is the author of From anti-imperialism to post-capitalism and the APRA, published by the Editorial Fund of the National University of San Marcos, in February 2018. He is also the brother of Marco Antonio Zevallos, a ranking member of First The People – Community, Ecology, Liberty, and Progress and a former member of the Purple Party.
