= Juan Carlos Sánchez Montes de Oca =

Peruvian economist and politician

- Born: Juan Carlos Sánchez Montes de Oca; 4 March 1964 (age 62); Lima, Peru
- Education: Universidad Nacional Federico Villarreal (BA); National Agrarian University (MS)
- Occupations: Economist; politician
- Political party: Peruvian Aprista Party

Juan Carlos "Cocoli" Sánchez Montes de Oca (born 4 March 1964) is a Peruvian economist and politician. A member of the Peruvian Aprista Party (APRA), he ran for the party's presidential nomination in 2020, losing to Nidia Vílchez. He ran for a second time for the nomination for the 2026 general election, placing fifth in the primary election by attaining 2.6% of the members’ vote, losing to newcomer Enrique Valderrama.

An economics graduate from the Universidad Nacional Federico Villarreal, Sánchez served in variety of roles during his university years as a member of the Juventud Aprista Peruana, his party's youth wing. He unsuccessfully ran for a seat in the Congress of the Republic in the 2016 general election, representing APRA within the Popular Alliance coalition's Lima Metropolitan Area list.

== Electoral history ==
Election	Office	List	#	District	Votes			Result	Ref.
Election	Office	List	#	District	Total	%	P.	Result	Ref.
2016	Member of Congress	Popular Alliance	33	Lima Metropolitan Area	2,752	8.81%	4th (Note: Presented on an electoral list. The data shown represents the share of the vote the entire party/alliance received in that constituency.)	Not elected	
