= Augusto Valqui =

Peruvian economist (born 1948)

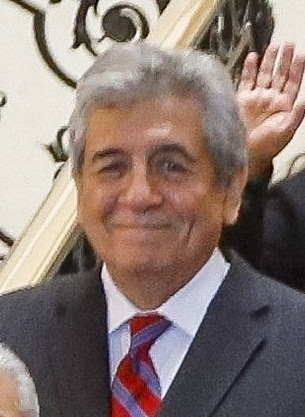

Minister of Transportation and Communications
- In office 12 November 2020 – 17 November 2020
- President: Manuel Merino
- Prime Minister: Ántero Flores-Aráoz
- Preceded by: Carlos Estremadoyro Mory
- Succeeded by: Eduardo González Chávez
- In office 9 May 1990 – 28 July 1990
- President: Alan García
- Prime Minister: Guillermo Larco Cox
- Preceded by: Oswaldo Morán
- Succeeded by: Eduardo Toledo Gonzales

Personal details
- Born: Augusto Raúl Valqui Malpica; 9 October 1948 (age 77) Lima, Peru
- Party: Peruvian Aprista Party
- Occupation: Public accountant

Augusto Raúl Valqui Malpica (born 9 October 1948) is a Peruvian public accountant and politician. He served as Minister of Transportation and Communications in Alan García’s first presidency in 1990 and for five days under Manuel Merino in 2020.

A member of the Peruvian Aprista Party (APRA), Valqui ran for the party's presidential nomination for the 2026 general election. He placed ninth in the primary election attaining less than 0.5% of the members’ vote, losing to newcomer Enrique Valderrama.

Prior to his first stint as government minister under Alan García, Valqui served as Chairman of the Board of the Peruvian Corporation of Commercial Airports and Aviation (CORPAC) from 1986 to 1989.

== Electoral history ==
=== Legislative ===
Election	Office	List	#	District	Votes			Result	Ref.
Election	Office	List	#	District	Total	%	P.	Result	Ref.
2000	Member of Congress	Peruvian Aprista Party	111	National	1,070	5.51%	5th (Note: Presented on an electoral list. The data shown represents the share of the vote the entire party/alliance received in that constituency.)	Not elected	

=== Regional ===
Electoral history of Victoria Villarruel
Election	Office	List	Votes			Result	Ref.
Election	Office	List	Total	%	P.	Result	Ref.
2002	Lieutenant Governor of Callao	"Together for Callao" Independent Movement	11,574	3.09%	7th	Not elected	
