= Carlos Álvarez (comedian) =

Peruvian comedian (born 1964)

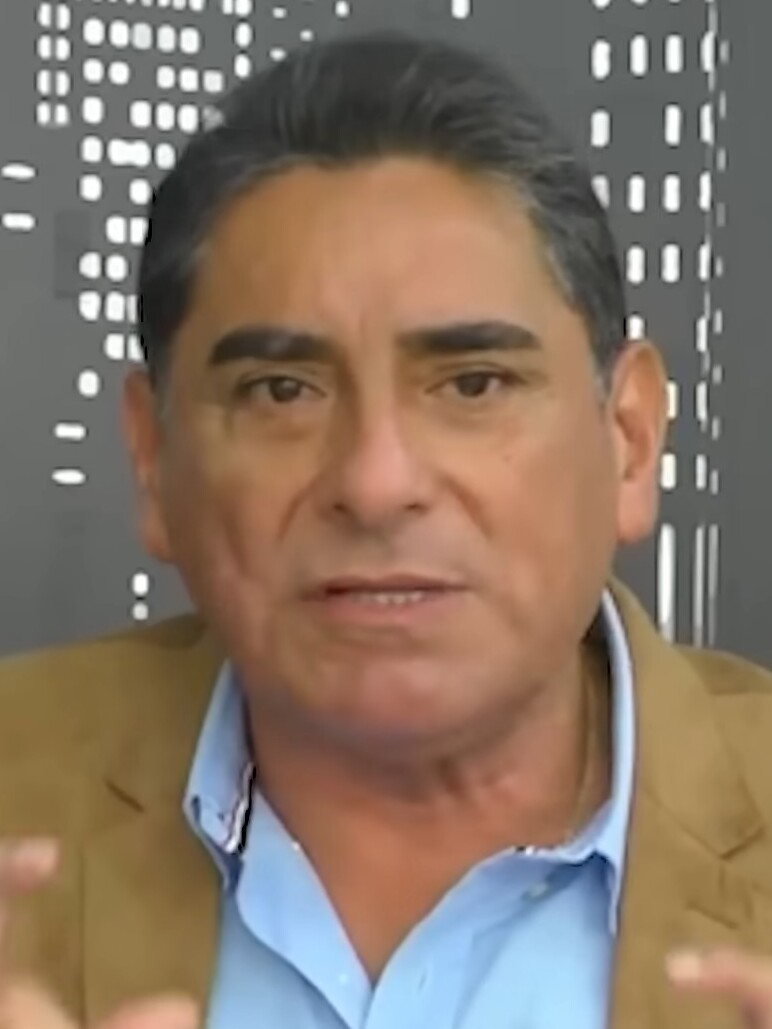
- Álvarez in 2025
- Born: 7 January 1964 (age 62)
- Years active: 1983–present
- Political party: Country for All (2024-2026)
- Other political affiliations: Let's Go Peru (2017-2021)
- Relatives: Arturo Álvarez (brother)
- Awards: Luces Award (2008, 2009)

Comedy career
- Genres: Parody; impressions
- Subject: Politics of Peru

TikTok information
- Page: carlosalvarez_tiktok
- Followers: 562.6 thousand
- Last updated: 30 July 2025

Carlos Gonsalo Álvarez Loayza (born 7 January 1964) is a Peruvian comedian, television presenter and screenwriter. He was a presidential candidate for the 2026 Peruvian general election, a nominee of the Country for All political party.

== Comedy career ==
He is the brother of Arturo Álvarez. Known for his parodies and impressions of Peruvian politicians, Álvarez has appeared in several comedy programs, including Risas y Salsa, El Especial del Humor and El Cártel del Humor. In 2008, he won the Luces Award from the newspaper El Comercio for Best Comedian, and his show El Especial del Humor won Best Comedy Show. In 2009, he won the Luces Award for Face of the Year.

== 2026 presidential campaign ==
In 2024, Álvarez joined the political party Country for All. In 2025, he expressed interest in running for president of Peru in the 2026 election. He is currently a frontrunner in the election alongside Keiko Fujimori and Rafael López Aliaga. According to a February 2026 CELAG poll, Álvarez was the most approved candidate listed, with 25.4% of respondents having a positive view of him.

== Political positions ==
Politically, Álvarez does not identify himself on the political spectrum, although he has been described as right wing or far right. He believes that Peru should withdraw from the Inter-American Court of Human Rights, which he described as "ideologized". Describing himself as "the Peruvian Bukele", he said that if in office, he would designate all criminals as military targets subject to death if they did not surrender, saying "to hell with the human rights of criminals".
