= Carla García =

Peruvian communicator and writer

- Born: Carla Ximena García Buscaglia; 9 February 1975 (age 51); Lima, Peru
- Education: University of Chile; Universidad Alas Peruanas; International University of La Rioja
- Occupations: Communicator; writer; audiovisual producer
- Political party: Peruvian Aprista Party (2020–present)
- Partner: José Antonio Mendoza (2020–present)
- Parent(s): Alan García Pérez; Carla Buscaglia Castellano

Carla Ximena García Buscaglia (born 9 February 1975) is a Peruvian communicator, writer, and audiovisual producer.

García's career in the Peruvian media spans two decades, having worked as columnist for La República from 2008 and 2018 under the title of Esquina baja. As a political commentator, she conducted a political radio talk alongside Beto Ortiz in Radio Capital in 2014, and most notably hosted the evening show Políticas in Willax Televisión from 2021 to 2023, focusing on female participation in Peruvian politics, with women representing 60% of the 450 guests she hosted.

The daughter of the late former President of Peru, Alan García, she is a member of the Peruvian Aprista Party.

== Electoral history ==
Election	Office	List	#	District	Votes			Result	Ref.
Election	Office	List	#	District	Total	%	P.	Result	Ref.
2026	Senator of the Republic	Peruvian Aprista Party	1	National	84,543	1.71%	12th (Note: Presented on an electoral list. The data shown represents the share of the vote the entire party/alliance received in that constituency.)	Not elected	
