= Luis Wilson =

Peruvian politician

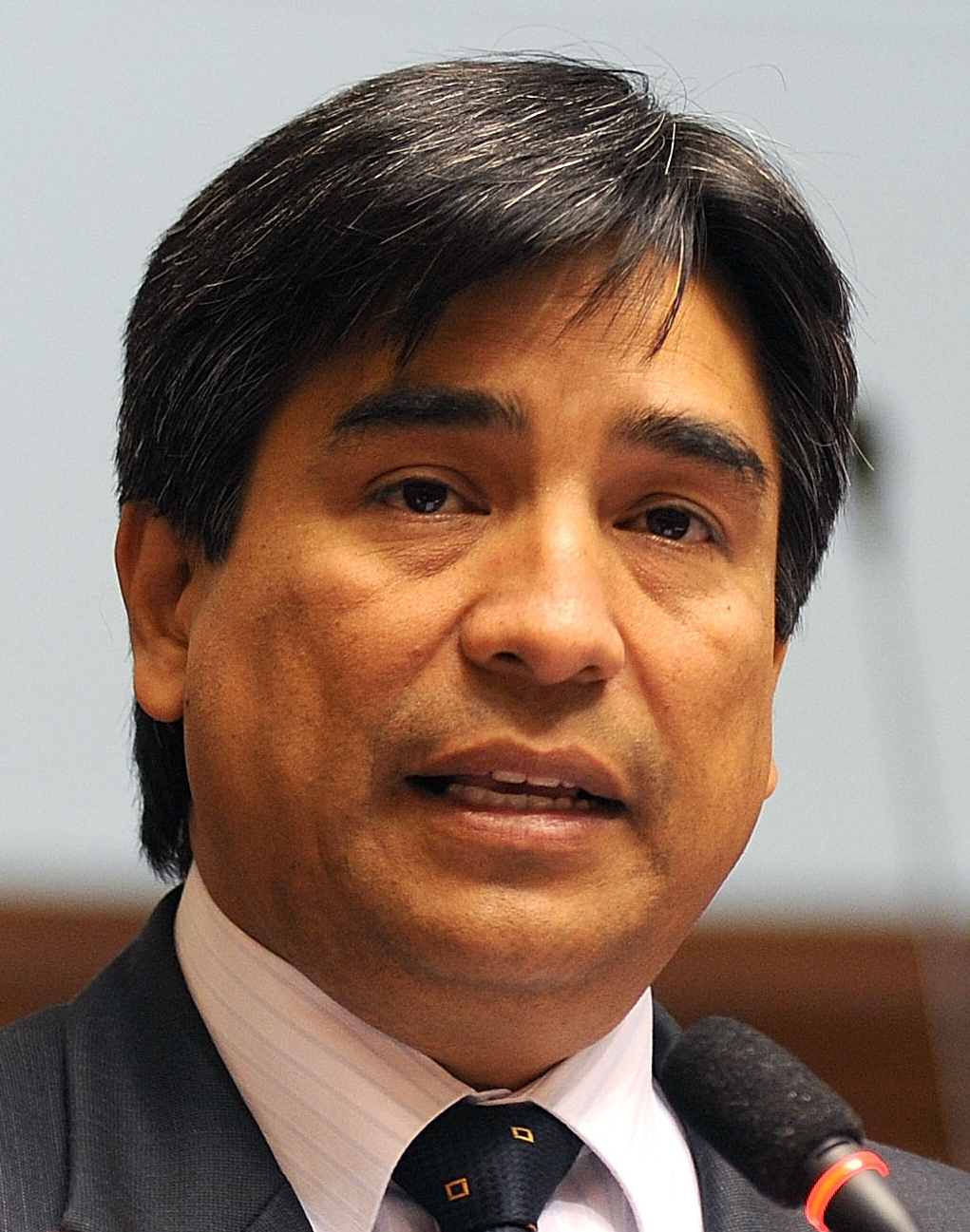

Member of Congress
- In office 26 July 2006 – 26 July 2011
- Constituency: Cusco

Personal details
- Born: Luis Daniel Wilson Ugarte; 20 February 1962 (age 64) Quillabamba, Peru
- Party: Peruvian Aprista Party
- Occupation: Otorhinolaryngologist

Luis Daniel Wilson Ugarte (born 20 February 1962) is a Peruvian politician. He is a former Congressman, elected in the 2006 elections, representing the Cusco region for the 2006–2011 period. Wilson belongs to the Peruvian Aprista Party.

== Biography ==
He completed his primary studies at the 51027 Educational Center in his hometown and his secondary studies at Colegio Manco II and at Colegio La Salle in Cusco. He completed his university studies in Human Medicine at the National University of San Agustín. He has a Master's Degree in Public Health at the Universidad Peruana Cayetano Heredia. As a doctor he worked between 1990-2001 at the Quillabamba Hospital and since 2001 at the Antonio Lorena Hospital.

He participated in the regional elections of 2002 as candidate of the Aprista Party for the Regional Presidency of Cusco without success. He was affiliated from 2005 to 2010 to the Peruvian Aprista Party, being Secretary General La Convencion between 1992-1993 and Secretary General Cusco between 2005-2006. He was also elected provincial councilor of La Convencion between 1997-2001 and Congressman of the Republic 2006-2011.

He participated in the 2014 Cusco regional elections as a candidate for Regional President of the Popular Alliance made up of APRA and National Restoration, finishing third. In the 2018 regional elections, he participated as a candidate for Regional Governor for the political organization National Restoration, contesting the second round that he lost to the Popular Action candidate, Jean Paul Benavente.

== Electoral history ==
=== Legislative ===
Election	Office	List	#	District	Votes			Result	Ref.
Election	Office	List	#	District	Total	%	P.	Result	Ref.
2000	Member of Congress	Peruvian Aprista Party	89	National	2,952	5.56%	5th (Note: Presented on an electoral list. The data shown represents the share of the vote the entire party/alliance received in that constituency.)	Not elected	
2001	Member of Congress	Peruvian Aprista Party	3	Cusco	11,508	11.46%	3rd	Not elected	
2006	Member of Congress	Peruvian Aprista Party	1	Cusco	37,866	19.11%	3rd	Elected	
2016	Member of Congress	Popular Alliance	1	Cusco	14,297	8.47%	5th	Not elected	

=== Regional ===
Electoral history of Victoria Villarruel
Election	Office	List	Votes			Result	Ref.
Election	Office	List	Total	%	P.	Result	Ref.
2002	Governor of Cusco	Peruvian Aprista Party	66,570	15.81%	4th	Not elected	
2014	Governor of Cusco	Popular Alliance	56,297	9.35%	3rd	Not elected	
2018 1-R	Governor of Cusco	National Restoration	86,710	14.76%	2nd	→ Round 2	
2018 2-R	Governor of Cusco	National Restoration	168,303	29.58%	2nd	Not elected	

=== Provincial ===
Election	Office	List	#	Votes			Result	Ref.
Election	Office	List	#	Total	%	P.	Result	Ref.
1993	La Convención Province Councilman	Peruvian Aprista Party	2	1,679	10.13%	3rd (Note: Presented on an electoral list. The data shown represents the share of the vote the entire party/alliance received in that constituency.)	Elected	
1998	La Convención Province Councilman	Unidad Convenciana	2	13,642	36.07%	1st	Elected	
