= Hernán Garrido Lecca =

Peruvian politician (born 1960)

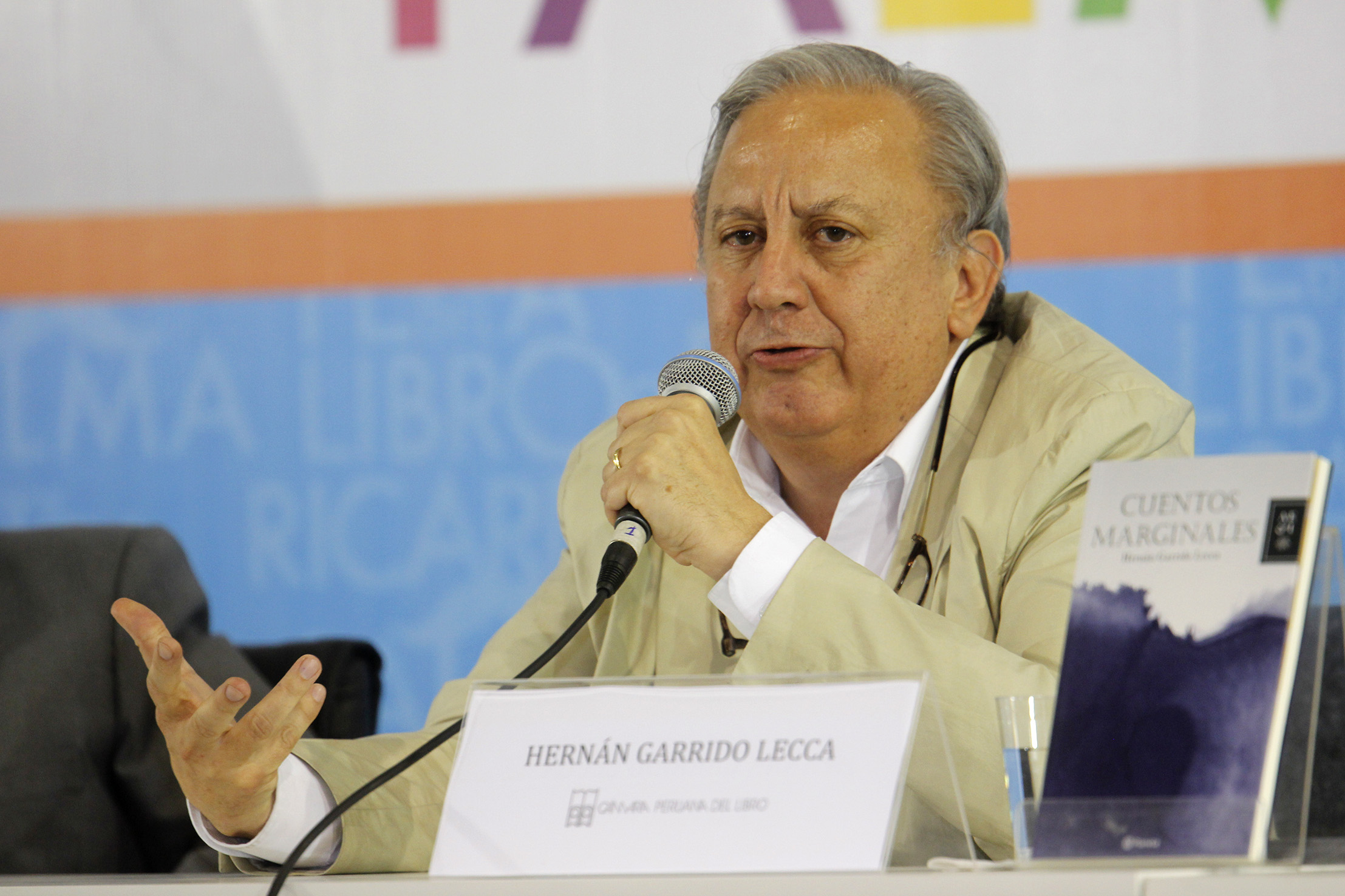

Minister of Health
- In office 20 December 2007 – 14 October 2008
- President: Alan García
- Prime Minister: Jorge del Castillo
- Preceded by: Carlos Vallejos Sologuren
- Succeeded by: Oscar Ugarte Ubillús

Minister of Housing, Construction, and Sanitation
- In office 28 July 2006 – 20 December 2007
- President: Alan García
- Prime Minister: Jorge del Castillo
- Preceded by: Rudecindo Vega
- Succeeded by: Enrique Cornejo

Personal details
- Born: 18 May 1960 (age 66) Lima, Peru
- Party: Peruvian Aprista Party (2004–present)
- Other political affiliations: Independent (before 2004)
- Education: University of the Pacific (BA); Harvard University (MPA); Massachusetts Institute of Technology (MS); National University of San Marcos (MA); University of Seville (PhD)
- Occupation: Writer, inventor, film producer, public administrator
- Profession: Economist

Hernán Jesús Garrido Lecca Montañez (born 18 May 1960) is a Peruvian economist, writer, producer, inventor, and politician. A popular children's literature author in Peru, he is most recognized by his work Pirates in Callao, which was adapted into the first CGI motion picture in Peruvian cinematography.

At political level, he is a prominent member of the Peruvian Aprista Party, having managed Alan García’s successful presidential campaign in 2006, after which he served as a cabinet minister in the first two years of García’s second administration.

== Early life and education ==
Born in the district of Pueblo Libre in western Lima, Garrido Lecca completed his primary and secondary education at the Admiral Guise Naval School. Graduating from the University of the Pacific with a major in economics, he subsequently attended Harvard Kennedy School and the Massachusetts Institute of Technology, attaining a Master of Public Administration degree and a MS in Technology and Policy, respectively. He attained a doctoral degree in Applied Economics at the University of Seville.

Garrido Lecca’s interest in literature led him to complete the master's program in Peruvian and Latin American Literature at the National University of San Marcos. Additionally, he holds the rank of reserve major of the Peruvian Army, and is also a private pilot.

== Inventing career ==
Interested in invention, Garrido Lecca won the first prize in the National Inventors' Contest for “Original Ice Bucket 1 x 1” in 1996 and the Gold Medal at the XXV International Exhibition of Inventions in Geneva for the same invention in 1997. He has 11 patents, one of them registered and licensed in the United States for the ice bucket.

In addition, Garrido Lecca founded and has presided over the Peruvian Society of Inventors, and often ranks among the top ten Peruvian inventors with a large number of patents.

== Political career ==
After working in radio and television journalism in different media for more during the 1990s and publishing books in the fields of economics, science and technology, and consumer advocacy, Garrido Lecca entered politics by running for the Peruvian Congress at the 2001 general election with Union for Peru. Although not elected, he was recruited in the Peruvian Aprista Party as an advisor to former president Alan García. He was subsequently appointed as campaign manager for García’s successful presidential run for the 2006 general election.

=== Cabinet minister under García ===
At the start of the second presidency of Alan García in July 2006, Garrido Lecca was appointed Minister of Housing, Construction and Sanitation. In December 2007, he was rotated in the cabinet as Minister of Health.

Garrido Lecca resigned on 14 October 2008, amid the 2008 oil scandal, which led president Alan García to sack his entire cabinet led by Jorge del Castillo. Mentioned in one of the audio tapes between the protagonists of the scandal, Garrido Lecca was called as a witness throughout the investigations in which he recognized having met with Dominican businessman Fortunato Canaan at some point before the scandal erupted.

=== 2026 presidential run ===
During a television interview in ATV in late August 2024, Garrido Lecca announced his candidacy for the Peruvian Aprista Party presidential nomination for the 2026 general election.

Into 2025, Garrido Lecca announced Omar Quesada and Olga Cribilleros as his running mates, registering his ticket in order to participate in the presidential primary to be held on 30 November 2025.

At the primary election held on 30 November 2025, Garrido Lecca finished fourth with 2,278 votes (15.95 percent), losing to newcomer Enrique Valderrama, who received 3,711 votes (25.98 percent), and trailing behind Javier Velásquez and Jorge del Castillo. The outcome was broadly seen as a major upset from an external perspective, since the more seasoned candidates were widely expected to prevail based on their established political careers and internal coalitions. Upon learning the results, Garrido Lecca conceded the election and announced his support for Valderrama in his presidential campaign.

== Filmography ==
=== Film ===
Year	Title	Writer	Producer	Notes
2005	Pirates in Callao	Yes	Yes	Based on his own published work
2006	Dragones: destino de fuego	Yes	No	
2008	El acuarelista	No	Yes	
2021	1214: No tememos a los cobardes	No	Yes	Documentary
2023	Justicia para Alan	No	Yes	Documentary
2023	Milagros: An Extraordinary Bear	Yes	Yes	Based on his own published work

== Published works ==
- El Reino en una Botella Gorda (1989).
- Piratas en el Callao, Alfaguara (1996).
- La vicuña de ocho patas, Alfaguara (1997).
- La Mena y Anisilla, Alfaguara (1999).
- El secreto de las islas de Pachacamac, Alfaguara (2000).
- Benedicto Sabayachi y la Mujer Stradivarius, ENA (2000)
- Los magos del silencio, Alfaguara (2001).
- Una historia de mi entierro y otros cuentos, UIGLV (2002)
- John-John, el dragón del lago Titicaca, Norma (2003).
- El unicornio más veloz, Norma (2005).
- De cómo quedé estando aquí, El Virrey (2008)
- El Cazador de Arcos Iris, Pearson (2009).
- La ballenita que no quería comer, Alfaguara (2009).
- Manual de Vuelo, Alfaguara (2010)
- Catalina, la mantarraya que quería volar, Norma (2011).
- El elefante rosado, Alfaguara (2012).
- El extraño caso del Dr. Yonny Palomino Linares, SM (2012).
- Los bomberos, Altea (2013).
- Valicha y el halcón sin nombre, Graph Ediciones (2013).
- Don Ruperto Distinto, Graph Ediciones (2013).
- El secreto de Tony Huang y otros cuentos, Alfaguara (2014).
- Milagros, una osa extraorinaria, Alfaguara (2014):
- El elixir de la inteligencia en Cuentos Capitales, Alfaguara (2013).
- Hay que ir a triunfar al mundial en Cuentos desde la cancha, Planeta (2014).
- Cuentos Marginales, Planeta (2016).
- El secreto de las Islas de Pachacamac, Alfaguara
- Microrrelatos del Sur y de otros tantos mundos, SM (2018).

== Electoral history ==
Election	Office	List	#	District	Votes			Result	Ref.
Election	Office	List	#	District	Total	%	P.	Result	Ref.
2001	Member of Congress	Union for Peru - Social Democracy	2	Lima Metropolitan Area	34,139	2.75%	8th (Note: Presented on an electoral list. The data shown represents the share of the vote the entire party/alliance received in that constituency.)	Not elected	
