= Ministry of Transport and Communications (Peru) =

Government ministry of Peru

Coordinates: 12.04884°S 77.05621°W

- Ministerio de Transportes y Comunicaciones del Perú

Ministry overview
- Formed: March 25, 1969
- Jurisdiction: Peru
- Headquarters: Jr. Zorritos 1203, Lima
- Minister responsible: César Sandoval
- Website: www.mtc.gob.pe

The Ministry of Transport and Communications (Spanish: Ministerio de Transportes y Comunicaciones, MTC) of Peru is the government ministry responsible for regulating transportation and communications services.

As of 28 June 2026, the minister of transport and communications is Rafael Rey under the presidency of Keiko Fujimori .

== History ==
From December 24, 1896, onwards, a Secretariat of Development—later a Directory of Development—functioned as part of the Ministry of Development and Public Works. Under Juan Velasco Alvarado, the ministry was formally created on March 25, 1969.

On May 11, 1992, under the government of Alberto Fujimori, the ministry was merged with that of Housing and Construction, creating the Ministry of Transport, Communications, Housing and Construction (Spanish: Ministerio de Transportes, Comunicaciones, Vivienda y Construcción, MTCVC). It was reestablished on July 10, 2002.

== Organisation ==
- General Secretariat
- Vice Ministry of Transport
  - Directorate-General of Civil Aeronautics
  - Directorate-General of Water Transport
  - Directorate-General of Roads and Railways
  - Directorate-General of Land Transport
  - Directorate-General of Socio-Environmental Affairs
  - Directorate-General of Transport Programs and Projects
  - Special Transportation Infrastructure Project (PROVIAS; National and Decentralised): agency responsible for managing transportation infrastructure in Peru.
  - Urban Transport Authority (ATU): integrates and coordinates urban public transport in Lima and Callao.
  - National Port Authority (APN): promotes the development and control of ports.
  - Superintendency of Land Transport of Persons, Cargo, and Goods
  - National Sustainable Urban Transport Program
  - Peruvian Airports and Commercial Aviation Corporation S.A. (CORPAC S.A.): private state-owned company dedicated to air navigation and airport services.
  - National Ports Company S.A. (Spanish: Empresa Nacional de Puertos, S. A., ENAPU S.A.): privately owned company dedicated to the administration, operation, and maintenance of ports in Peru and Chile. It was created as an S.A. on January 1, 1970. It operates in the cities of Ilo (Port of Ilo), Chicama (Port of Chicama), Huacho (Port of Huacho), Barranca (Port of Supe), Iquitos (Port of Iquitos), Yurimaguas (Port of Yurimaguas), Puerto Maldonado (Port of Maldonado) and in Arica, where it operates the MASP Arica.
  - Peruvian Postal Services S.A. (SERPOST S.A.): It is a privately owned company dedicated to providing postal services nationally and internationally.
- Vice Ministry of Communications
  - Directorate-General of Regulation and International Communications Affairs (GDRAIC)
  - Directorate-General of Communications Concessions
  - Directorate-General of Telecommunications Authorizations
  - Directorate-General of Communications Control and Supervision
- Transport Advisory Commission
- Technical Secretariat of FITEL

Entities administered by the ministry include:

- Organisations
  - Superintendency of Land Transportation of Persons, Cargo, and Goods (SUTRAN): Agency responsible for regulating the transportation of persons, cargo, and goods.
  - Consultative Council of Radio and Television (CONCORTV): Advisory body that contributes to the development of radio and television.
  - National Telecommunications Programme (Pronatel): Agency responsible for the development of telecommunications infrastructure in Peru.
- Authorities
  - National Sustainable Urban Transport Program (PROMOVILIDAD): responsible for promoting integrated transportation systems in cities, serving as the governing body for urban transport.
- Former:
  - Autonomous Authority of the Lima and Callao Mass Electric Transportation System (AATE): It was the agency in charge of executing the Lima and Callao Metro. It depended on the central government from 1986 until its merger with the ATU in 2019, with a period between 2001 and 2009 when it was transferred to the Metropolitan Municipality of Lima.
  - Peruvian Telephone Company (CPT): state-owned company responsible for telephone, telecommunications, and cable television services, operating only in the Lima metropolitan area. It was privatised in 1993.
  - National Telecommunications Company of Peru (ENTEL PERU): state-owned company responsible for telecommunications and satellite television services, operating nationwide outside the scope of the CPT.
  - National Urban Transport Company (ENATRU): state-owned company responsible for urban transportation in various departments of Peru.
  - Special Project for the preparation and development of the XVIII Pan American Games and Sixth Parapan American Games Lima 2019: Corporation in charge of executing the works to achieve the optimal organisation of the aforementioned games.
  - Special Legacy Project for the Pan American and Parapan American Games (Legacy): responsible for ensuring the maintenance of the infrastructure and equipment used during the 2019 Pan American Games. It was later transferred to the Presidency of the Council of Ministers.
  - Technical Secretariat of the Lima and Callao Transportation Council: Body responsible for identifying problems and finding solutions to urban transportation in Lima and Callao, in order to avoid conflicts between municipalities.

=== Commission for the Investigation of Aviation Accidents ===
The Commission for the Investigation of Aviation Accidents (Spanish: Comisión de Investigación de Accidentes de Aviación, CIAA) is the department responsible for air accident investigation. Notable investigations by the CIAA include TANS Perú Flight 204 and TANS Perú Flight 222.

== List of ministers ==
Name	Party	Period	
Name	Party	Term start	Term end
Ministers of Transport and Communications (1969–1992)
Alberto Maldonado Yáñez	—	October 3, 1968	April 1, 1969
Aníbal Meza Cuadra Cárdenas	—	April 1, 1969	December 30, 1972
Raúl Meneses Arata	—	December 31, 1972	August 30, 1975
Raúl Meneses Arata	—	August 30, 1975	September 16, 1975
Artemio García Vargas	—	September 16, 1975	August 17, 1976
Elivio Vannini Chumpitazi	—	August 17, 1976	July 25, 1979
José Soriano Morgan	—	July 25, 1979	July 28, 1980
Eduardo Orrego Villacorta	Acción Popular	July 28, 1980	August 11, 1980
Fernando Chaves Belaunde	Acción Popular	August 11, 1980	August 2, 1982
Carlos Pestana Zevallos	Acción Popular	August 2, 1982	July 28, 1984
Francisco Aramayo Pinazo	Acción Popular	July 28, 1984	July 28, 1985
José Murgia Zannier	APRA	July 28, 1985	June 27, 1987
Julio German Parra Herrera	APRA	June 27, 1987	July 16, 1988
Francisco Maury López	—	July 16, 1988	September 6, 1988
Camilo Carrillo Gómez	—	September 6, 1988	March 11, 1989
Luis Heysen Zegarra	APRA	March 11, 1989	October 6, 1989
Oswaldo Morán Márquez	—N/a	October 6, 1989	May 9, 1990
Augusto Valqui	APRA	May 9, 1990	July 28, 1990
Eduardo Toledo Gonzáles	—N/a	July 28, 1990	January 8, 1991
Jaime Yoshiyama Tanaka	Cambio 90	January 8, 1991	November 6, 1991
Alfredo Ross Antezana	—N/a	November 6, 1991	February 3, 1993
Ministers of Transport, Communications, Housing and Construction (1992–2002)
Dante Córdova Blanco	Cambio 90	February 3, 1993	July 28, 1995
Juan Castilla Meza	—N/a	July 28, 1995	January 16, 1996
Manuel Vara Ochoa	Cambio 90	January 16, 1996	April 3, 1996
Elsa Carrera Cabrera	Cambio 90	April 3, 1996	December 31, 1997
Antonio Paúcar Carbajal	—N/a	December 31, 1997	January 6, 1999
Alberto Pandolfi Arbulú	Cambio 90	January 6, 1999	July 28, 2000
Augusto Bedoya Cámere	—N/a	August 3, 2000	November 21, 2000
Luis Ortega Navarrete	Acción Popular	November 25, 2000	July 28, 2001
Luis Chang Reyes	Perú Posible	July 28, 2001	July 12, 2002
Ministers of Transport and Communications
Javier Reátegui Roselló	Perú Posible	July 12, 2002	June 28, 2003
Eduardo Iriarte Jiménez	FIM	June 28, 2003	February 16, 2004
José Ortiz Rivera	—	February 16, 2004	July 28, 2006
Verónica Zavala Lombardi	—	July 28, 2006	November 29, 2008
Enrique Cornejo Ramirez	APRA	November 29, 2008	July 28, 2011
Carlos Paredes Rodríguez	—	July 28, 2011	June 23, 2014
José Gallardo Ku	—	June 23, 2014	July 28, 2016
Martín Vizcarra Cornejo	PPK	July 28, 2016	May 22, 2017
Bruno Giuffra Monteverde	—	May 25, 2017	March 23, 2018
Edmer Trujillo Mori	—	March 28, 2018	April 14, 2019
María Jara Risco	—	April 26, 2019	October 3, 2019
Edmer Trujillo Mori	—	October 3, 2019	February 13, 2020
Carlos Lozada Contreras	—	February 13, 2020	July 15, 2020
Carlos Estremadoyro Mory	—	July 15, 2020	November 10, 2020
Augusto Valqui	APRA	November 12, 2020	November 17, 2020
Eduardo González Chávez	—	November 18, 2020	July 28, 2021
Juan Silva Villegas	—	July 29, 2021	February 28, 2022
Nicolás Bustamante Coronado	—	March 4, 2022	May 22, 2022
Juan Barranzuela Quiroga	—	May 22, 2022	August 5, 2022
Geiner Alvarado López	—	August 5, 2022	September 16, 2022
Richard Tineo Quispe	UPP	September 24, 2022	December 7, 2022
Paola Lazarte Castillo	—	December 13, 2022	September 6, 2023
Raúl Pérez-Reyes Espejo	—	September 6, 2023	Incumbent

== See also ==
- Transport in Peru
- Ministry of Housing, Construction and Sanitation (Peru)
