= Ministry of Housing, Construction and Sanitation =

Government ministry of Peru

- Ministerio de Vivienda, Construcción y Saneamiento
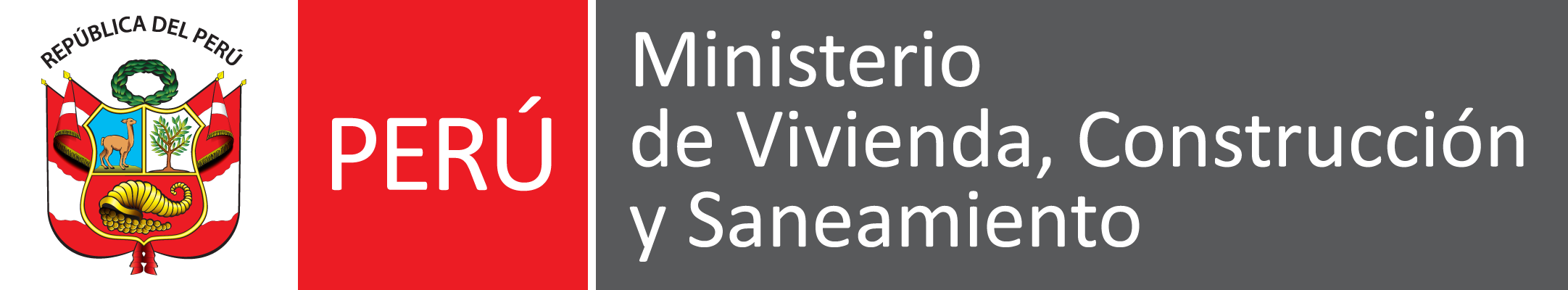

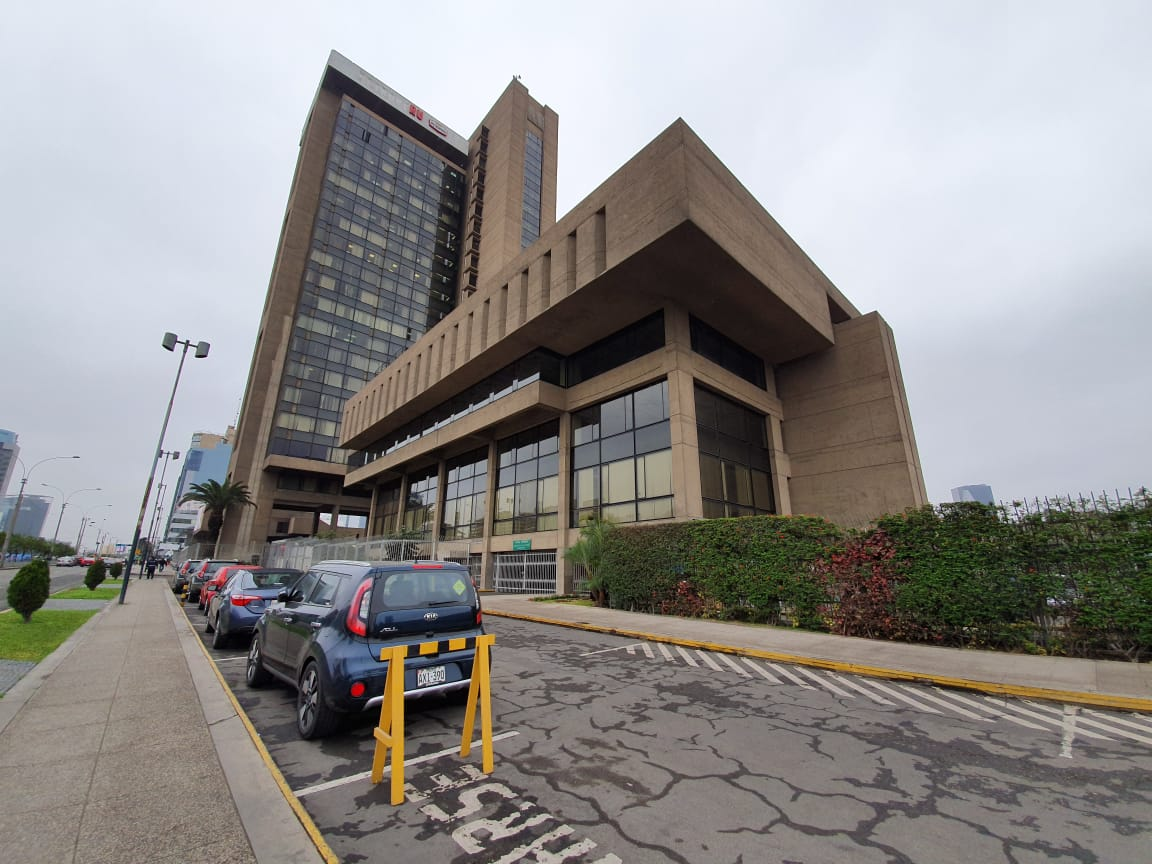

Agency overview
- Formed: 11 July 2002; 24 years ago
- Headquarters: PetroPerú Building
- Minister responsible: Wilder Sifuentes
- Website: www.gob.pe/vivienda

The Ministry of Housing, Construction and Sanitation (Spanish: Ministerio de Vivienda, Construcción y Saneamiento, MVCS) of Peru is the government ministry responsible for housing materials and construction, as well as the administration of the country's water supply.

As of 2025, the minister responsible is Wilder Sifuentes.

== History ==
In 1969, under the Revolutionary Government of the Armed Forces of Peru, the Ministry of Development and Public Works was dissolved. Its Development and Public Works Sector was replaced by the Ministry of Transport and Communications, and its National Housing Board was replaced by the Ministry of Housing and Construction (Spanish: Ministerio de Vivienda y Construcción, MVC).

On May 11, 1992, under the government of Alberto Fujimori, the ministry was merged with that of Transport and Communications, creating the Ministry of Transport, Communications, Housing and Construction (Spanish: Ministerio de Transportes, Comunicaciones, Vivienda y Construcción, MTCVC). Under Alejandro Toledo, the creation of a Housing and Construction Ministry was announced in September 2001, eventually being created under its current name on July 11, 2002, one day after the reestablishment of the Ministry of Transport and Communications.

Under Toledo's presidency and Carlos Bruce's tenure, a number of programmes were established.

== Organisation ==
- General Secretariat
- Vice Ministry of Housing and Urban Development
  - Directorate-General of Housing and Urban Development Policies and Regulation
  - Directorate-General of Housing and Urban Development Programs and Projects
  - Directorate-General of Accessibility and Technological Development
  - Urban Land Generation Programme
  - Comprehensive Neighborhood Improvement Programme
  - Our Cities Programme
  - National Rural Housing Programme
- Vice Ministry of Construction and Sanitation
  - Directorate-General of Construction and Sanitation Policies and Regulation
  - Directorate-General of Construction and Sanitation Programs and Projects
  - Directorate-General of Environmental Affairs
  - National Urban Sanitation Programme
  - National Rural Sanitation Programme
- National Dairy Farm Programme

Entities administered by the ministry include:

- Public organisms:
  - Superintendencia Nacional de Bienes Estatales (SBN)
  - Organismo Técnico de la Administración de los Servicios de Saneamiento (OTASS)
  - Organismo de Formalización de la Propiedad Informal (COFOPRI)
- Entities:
  - Banco de Materiales SAC (BANMAT SAC)
  - Fondo MIVIVIENDA S. A. (FMV S.A.)
  - Servicio de Agua Potable y Alcantarillado de Lima (SEDAPAL)
  - Servicio Nacional de Capacitación para la Industria de la Construcción (SENCICO)
- Former:
  - Empresa Nacional de Edificaciones (ENACE)
  - Fondo Nacional de Vivienda (FONAVI)
  - Servicio de Parques de Lima (SERPAR)

== List of ministers ==
| Name | Party | Period | |
| Name | Party | Term start | Term end |
|---|---|---|---|
Ministers of Housing and Construction (1969–1992)
| Luis Vargas Caballero | — | April 1, 1969 | January 4, 1972 |
| Ramón Arróspide Mejía | — | January 4, 1972 | May 31, 1974 |
| Augusto Gálvez Velarde | — | May 31, 1974 | June 25, 1975 |
| Isaías Paredes Arana | — | June 25, 1975 | July 17, 1976 |
| Gerónimo Cafferata Marazzi | — | July 17, 1976 | August 16, 1977 |
| César Rosas Cresto | — | August 16, 1977 | July 27, 1980 |
| Javier Velarde Aspíllaga | — | July 28, 1980 | November 25, 1984 |
| Carlos Pestana Zevallos | — | November 25, 1984 | July 28, 1985 |
| Luis Felipe Bedoya Vélez | — | July 28, 1985 | March 1, 1989 |
| Antenor Orrego Spelucín | — | March 1, 1989 | July 28, 1990 |
| Guillermo del Solar Rojas | — | July 28, 1990 | November 6, 1991 |
| Óscar de la Puente Raygada | — | November 6, 1991 | July 28, 1993 |
Ministers of Transport, Communications, Housing and Construction (1992–2002)
See list
Ministers of Housing, Construction and Sanitation
| Carlos Bruce Montes de Oca | Perú Posible | July 13, 2002 | August 18, 2005 |
| Rudecindo Vega Carreazo | Perú Posible | August 19, 2005 | July 28, 2006 |
| Hernán Garrido-Lecca Montañez | APRA | July 28, 2006 | November 20, 2007 |
| Enrique Cornejo Ramírez | APRA | November 20, 2007 | November 29, 2008 |
| Nidia Vílchez Yucra | APRA | November 29, 2008 | June 11, 2009 |
| Francis Allison Oyague | —N/a | June 11, 2009 | September 29, 2009 |
| Juan Sarmiento Soto | APRA | September 29, 2009 | July 28, 2011 |
| René Cornejo Díaz | —N/a | July 28, 2011 | February 24, 2014 |
| Milton von Hesse La Serna | PNP | February 24, 2014 | October 11, 2015 |
| Francisco Dumler Cuya | — | October 11, 2015 | July 28, 2016 |
| Edmer Trujillo Mori | — | July 28, 2016 | September 17, 2017 |
| Carlos Bruce Montes de Oca | PPK | September 17, 2017 | April 2, 2018 |
| Javier Piqué del Pozo | —N/a | April 2, 2018 | March 11, 2019 |
| Carlos Bruce Montes de Oca | PPK | March 11, 2019 | April 14, 2019 |
| Miguel Estrada Mendoza | — | April 26, 2019 | September 30, 2019 |
| Rodolfo Yáñez Wendorff | — | October 3, 2019 | July 15, 2020 |
| Carlos Lozada Contreras | — | July 15, 2020 | November 10, 2020 |
| Hilda Sandoval Cornejo | — | November 12, 2020 | November 17, 2020 |
| Solangel Fernández Huanqui | — | November 18, 2020 | July 28, 2021 |
| Geiner Alvarado López | — | July 29, 2021 | August 5, 2022 |
| César Paniagua Chacón | — | August 5, 2022 | December 7, 2022 |
| Hania Pérez de Cuéllar Lubienska | — | December 10, 2022 | September 3, 2024 |
| Durich Whittembury | — | September 3, 2024 | Incumbent |

== See also ==
- Squatting in Peru
- Ministry of Transport and Communications (Peru)
