= Nidia Vílchez =

Peruvian politician (born 1964)

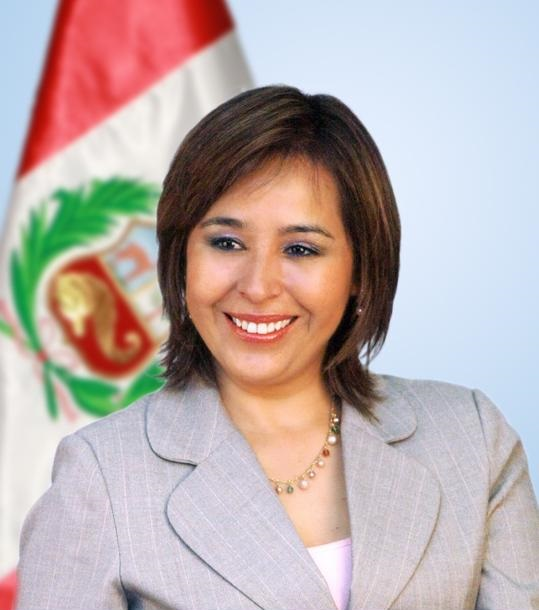

Minister of Women and Social Development
- In office 11 June 2009 – 14 September 2010
- President: Alan García
- Prime Minister: Yehude Simon; Javier Velásquez
- Preceded by: Carmen Vildoso
- Succeeded by: Virginia Borra

Minister of Housing, Construction and Sanitation
- In office 29 November 2008 – 11 June 2009
- President: Alan García
- Prime Minister: Yehude Simon
- Preceded by: Enrique Cornejo
- Succeeded by: Francis Allison

Member of Congress
- In office 26 July 2006 – 26 July 2011
- Constituency: Junín

Member of the Regional Assembly of the Andrés Avelino Cáceres Region
- In office 26 July 1990 – 5 April 1992

Personal details
- Born: 12 May 1964 (age 62) Huancayo, Junín, Peru
- Party: Peruvian Aprista Party
- Education: National University of the Center of Peru; Federico Villarreal National University (BA, Ph.D.); Pontifical Catholic University of Peru (MBA)
- Profession: Public accountant

Nidia Ruth Vílchez Yucra (born May 12, 1964) is a Peruvian public accountant and politician. A ranking member of the Peruvian Aprista Party, she served in the Peruvian Congress representing Junín from 2006 to 2011. During Alan García's second administration, she served in the positions of Minister of Housing, Construction and Sanitation and Minister of Women and Social Development.

In her last portfolio, she championed several structural reforms at social level, improving the societal conditions of the lower-income class, being credited with contributing the reduction of poverty from 48% to 28% from 2006 to 2011.She failed to attain reelection for Congress in 2011, 2016 and 2020, and lost the 2014 governorship election of Junín, placing second.

For the 2021 general election, Vílchez announced her candidacy for the Peruvian Aprista Party presidential nomination, in October 2020. On the primary election held in November 2020, she defeated two other candidates and formally obtained the nomination.

== Early life and education ==
Nidia Vílchez was born in Huancayo, central Peru on May 12, 1964. She completed her high school education at The Sacred Family School of Tarma and the Andean School of Huancayo. Upon graduation, she registered in the Peruvian Aprista Party, and subsequently enrolled in the National University of the Center of Peru in 1983 to study public accounting. In her fourth year, she transferred to the Federico Villarreal National University in Lima, graduating with a bachelor's degree in public accounting in 1990.

== Political career ==
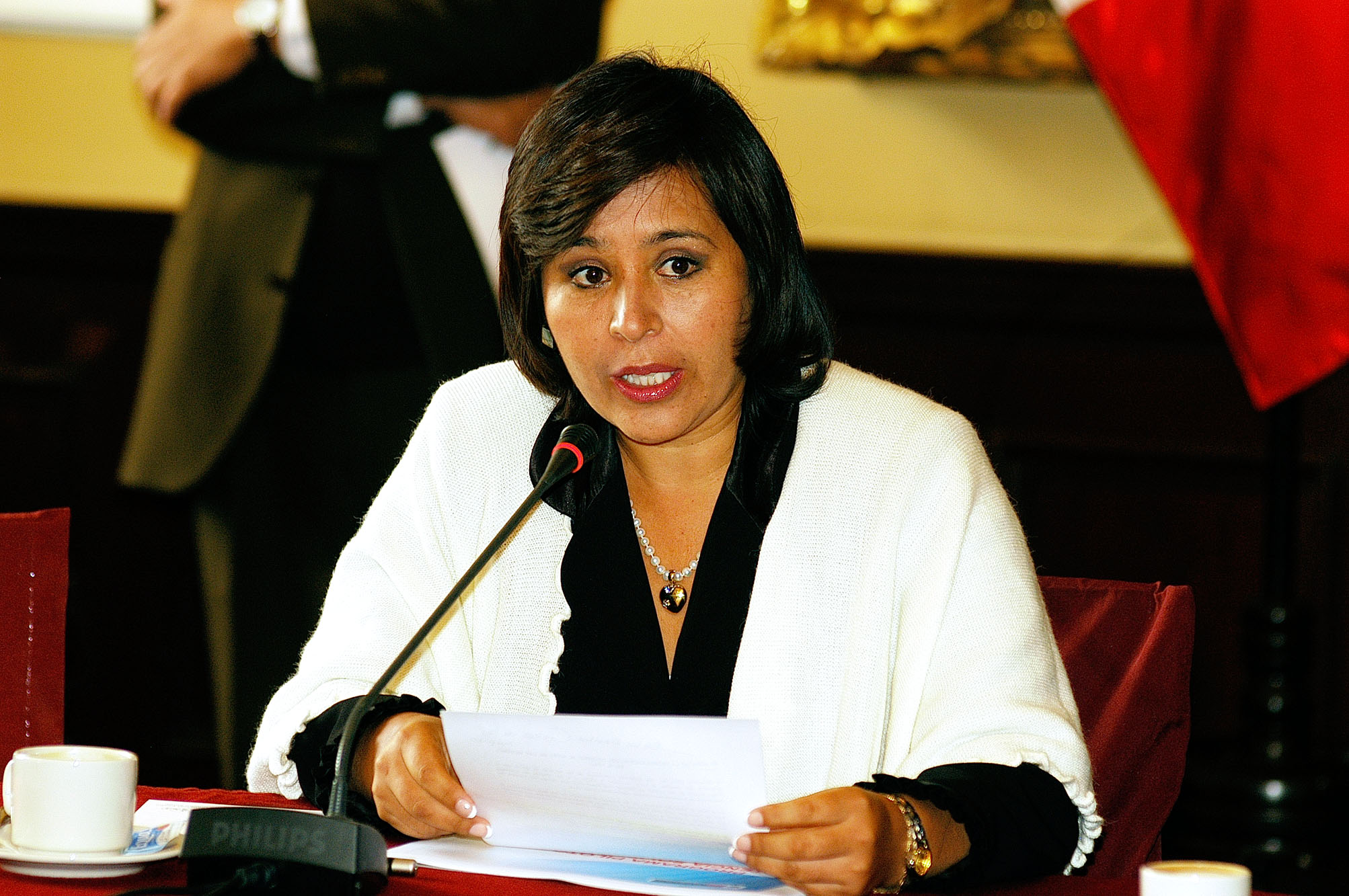
Nidia Vílchez at a press conference in Congress in 2007.

Upon graduating from Villarreal, Vílchez ran for the Regional Assembly of the newly constituted Andrés Avelino Cáceres Region. She was elected representing Huancayo with the Peruvian Aprista Party. Her term would be interrupted by president Alberto Fujimori's self-coup, which suspended the Regional Governments with their respective assemblies.

From 1992 to 1998, Vílchez turned to the private sector as she was hired as public administration consultant for the Friedrich Ebert Foundation office in Peru. She also served as General Manager for Progestion Consultores, from 1994 to 2000. From 1997 to 2001, she was appointed to the Ministry of Economy and Finance as a private consultant. In 2001, she was hired in the Judiciary as Deputy Manager of Logistics at the General Manager's Office. She would travel to Ayacucho in order to serve as Director of Management and Budget in Omar Quesada's regional administration.

At the 2006 general election, she was elected to the Peruvian Congress representing her native Junín with the Peruvian Aprista Party. During her parliamentary term, she served as chair of the Agrarian Committee, vice chair of the Economy, Banking and Financial Intelligence, and vice chair of the Budget Committee.

In November 2008, she was appointed Minister of Housing, Construction and Sanitation, succeeding fellow party member Enrique Cornejo. She became the first woman to hold the position. During her brief tenure, a great impulse was given to the construction of social interest housing, the titling of urban and rural properties; the fulfillment of the "Water for All" Program, and "Improvement of Neighborhoods and Villages" projects; the "My Lot" program and the Rural Housing Bonus were approved, and the Home User Ombudsman is created. She joined the PROINVERSIÓN board in her capacity as Minister.

In June 2009, she was switched to the Minister of Women and Social Development upon the resignation of Carmen Vildoso. During her tenure, she took initiative in promoting public policies that improved equality of opportunities and family. During her management, the “Gratitude” program was created, aimed at those over 75 years of age, and the free delivery of 5 million identity documents - DNI, to children under 14 years of age in agreement with the National Registry of Identification and Civil Status (RENIEC). She resigned in September 2010 in order to run for congressional reelection at the 2011 general election, although she was not reelected.

In 2014, she ran for Governor of Junín, placing second. At the 2016 general election, she ran with the Popular Alliance congressional list for Junín. Although she earned a high number of votes, the party only attained 5 seats nationally, and was not elected.

At the 2020 snap parliamentary election, Vílchez ran for a fourth time for a seat in Congress, but switching her constituency to Lima. Upon the release of the first projections, the Peruvian Aprista Party failed to pass the electoral threshold for congressional representation, although she earned a high number of votes individually, trailing behind Mauricio Mulder.

Vílchez remained active in the Peruvian Aprista Party executive committee as a former minister of Alan García second presidency.

=== 2021 presidential election ===
In the aftermath of the suicide of Alan García, the Peruvian Aprista Party seemed leaderless by the pundits. In addition, the 2020 parliamentary election proved a major blow for the party as for the first time in almost 60 years did not have congressional representation, obtaining 2.7% of the popular vote. Entering a renovation cycle, the party leadership announced their participation in the 2021 general election with no planned alliances. Vílchez was immediately among the potential candidates for the presidential nomination, mainly due to her positive government experience as cabinet minister.

Vílchez filed her candidacy ticket on 27 October 2020 by announcing former deputy minister of Social Development, Iván Hidalgo, and former congresswoman Olga Cribilleros, as running-mates. Challenged by newcomer chemist and writer Rafael Zevallos and former congressional candidate Juan Carlos Sánchez, Vílchez managed to secure the nomination before the primary election held on 29 November 2020. She withdrew from the race on 16 January 2021.
