= Neoliberalism in Peru =

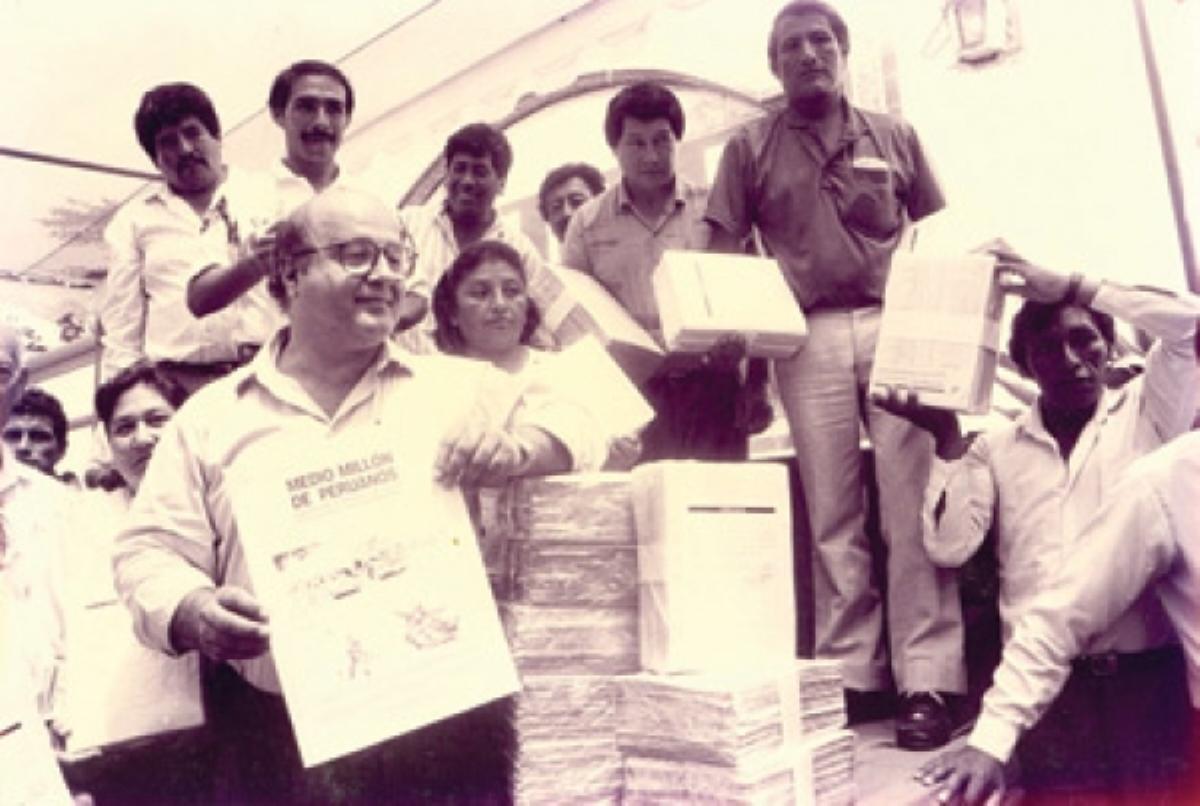
Hernando de Soto at a handover ceremony. Property formalization is one of the policies promoted by neoliberalism in the country.

Neoliberalism in Peru (sometimes referred to locally as "Criollo neoliberalism") first emerged on the political scene in Peru in the late 1980s. Neoliberalism is a political and economic ideology that advocates for free-market capitalism, and is known as Neoliberalismo in Spanish. The term has multiple, competing definitions, and is often used pejoratively. Its turning point came in the 1990s with the implementation of the Fujishock, a set of drastic economic measures taken by President Alberto Fujimori inspired by the US government based on the Washington Consensus, and with the promulgation of the 1993 Political Constitution, which was heavily influenced by neoliberalism. Although it suffered a setback in 1998, during the 1997 Asian financial crisis, it recovered and intensified during the period of greatest economic growth, driven by the commodities boom, between 2003 and 2013. It is one of the most comprehensive and longest-lasting implementations in Latin America, due to comparatively weak political opposition to neoliberalism.

Its main promoter was Hernando de Soto, who was key in the dissemination and consolidation of the neoliberal vision among business and political sectors in the 1980s. It has the backing of the Inter-American Development Bank (in the well-known Washington Consensus), multinational corporations and the social classes of the Peruvian coast, although its support among the middle class is rather nuanced or divided.

As an ideology, at least in the hands of Alberto Fujimori, Peruvian neoliberalism was associated with conservative positions. It was built on the ruins of liberal currents, which had lost influence in the country, but distanced itself socially from them and resorted to practices that limited liberal democracy. Its proponents promote economic measures such as deregulation and privatization, including the reduction of welfare spending and elimination of social programs.

Fujimori's project has transformed the Peruvian state into a predominantly business-oriented and wealth-generating entity. Furthermore, an economic elite was established that controls the financial services, export, and communications sectors, which are the determining factors in the unofficial Lima Consensus. The country achieved economic stability at the cost of greater social inequality and a clear restriction of freedom of expression among the sectors of the population, including indigenous peoples.

== Development of neoliberalism ==
=== Background ===
The origins of neoliberalism can be traced back to the founder of the country's economic thought, José Manuel Rodríguez (1857-1936). Rodríguez, possibly inspired by Classical liberalism, sought a solution to an economic crisis following the Guano era. Among his proposals was fiscal reform through tariff reductions, contrasted with interventionist capital controls. In 1912, Rodríguez was summoned by the Ministry of Finance (later Ministry of Economy and Finance).

In the late 1940s, the regime of Manuel Odría initiated a plan of economic liberalization.

In the 1950s, during Manuel Prado Ugarteche's second term, Pedro Beltrán Espantoso was appointed Minister of Finance. Educated at the London School of Economics, Beltrán implemented the first free-market measures. He disseminated his plans in the newspaper La Prensa, which primarily promoted its own free-market ideas during the 1940s to 1960s. He also implemented adjustment measures and sought loans from the International Monetary Fund (FMI). Peru was one of the first Latin American countries to have agreements with the IMF. Researcher Parodi indicates that, following Beltrán's fiscal stabilization measures and Prado's Industrial Promotion Law, the foundations were laid for an import substitution industrialization model.

Following Prado Ugarteche's departure, national investment fell to its lowest level in Latin America in 1968, according to Ernesto Álvarez Miranda. The middle class, rendered invisible in the country, opted to pursue social demands by joining oligarchic groups.CITEREFDíaz_Albertini2001 In the late 1960s, the government of Juan Velasco Alvarado sought to unify social participation and eradicate class struggle. With the help of some middle-class groups, the military succeeded in eliminating the upper classCITEREFDíaz_Albertini2001 and thus ended the liberal economy. Velasco implemented an industrial policy that resulted in the highest economic growth between 1969 and 1974, leading to the emergence of a national bourgeoisie.

The government of Francisco Morales Bermúdez was one of the first to promote neoliberalism without enshrining it in the Constitution. It reversed the measures of President Juan Velasco Alvarado, established new adjustment measures, and eliminated state-aid to workers. The changes were formalized with decree laws 22264 and 22265, issued on August 10, 1978. The government implemented the Plan Túpac Amaru, a milestone in the neoliberal ideological advance of the 1970s that initiated business diversification. At the end of the term, historian Henry Pease stated that the Partido Popular Cristiano (PPC) had contributed to the inclusion of a social market economy in the Constitution of 1979. According to Jürgen Schuldt, the PPC collaborated with specialists to develop a government plan aimed at implementing a "neoliberal economic ideology" in the country.

In the first half of the 1980s, Manuel Ulloa Elías implemented a new version of liberal economics to address the monetary crisis. As a member of Fernando Belaúnde's second government, he proposed eliminating price controls and limiting subsidies for the poor through a voucher system inspired by the United States plan. The system did not achieve the expected results. He also proposed privatizing companies and reforming the tax system, measures that also failed to produce the desired results for the country's economy. The team in charge of Ulloa's plan was disbanded in 1984.

In 1986, the first government of President Alan García implemented socialist measures to alleviate poverty, such as using accumulated government resources to finance consumption and imports. However, the lack of state planning to guarantee monetary reserves and stimulate private investment, as well as rising inflation, hampered the performance of the country's public administration. One of the biggest controversies was the nationalization of 33 banking and financial institutions. The result was the emergence of parallel banking. Alan García's term as president turned Peru into a pariah state in the international financial sector. Businesspeople who had previously placed their trust in García were disappointed.

=== Implementation ===
Fujimori implemented strong economic measures at the beginning of his term, between 1990 and 1991, following the Washington Consensus. This included reversing the nationalization of the banks and abandoning the manufacturing and industrial policies originated by Juan Velasco Alvarado. In effect, Fujimori eliminated the excessive regulation that kept local industry protected and established a single tariff rate, which would prove key for Peru's entry into APEC.

With the self-coup of 1992 and taking advantage of his brief period as de facto ruler through a repressive regime, Fujimori promulgated the 1993 Constitution, which reflected a marked neoliberal influence. In 1994, the Peruvian Institute of Economics (IPE) was created, tasked with providing technical and intellectual support to the Ministry of Economy and Finance, one of the Fujimori-era ministries.

Fujimori and his associates believed that the government's measures would culminate in strong economic growth by 1998, but this was prevented by the 1997–1998 economic crisis. Following this, a period ensued that the United Nations Economic Commission for Latin America and the Caribbean termed the "lost half-decade" (1998–2002). The political opposition criticized the neoliberal project for its fragility and dependence on foreign capital.

==== First neoliberal measures ====
The economist Hernando de Soto founded one of the first neoliberal organizations in Latin America, the Institute for Liberty and Democracy (ILD). Soto began receiving assistance from the Center for International Private Enterprise (CEPI), an organization of the National Endowment for Democracy (NED) under the administration of Ronald Reagan, to promote free market economics. Between 1988 and 1995, Soto and the ILD participated in four hundred initiatives, laws, and regulations that significantly modified Peru's economic system. In addition, Soto promoted the distribution of land titles to the popular sectors.

De Soto's ideas initially influenced the Democratic Front (Fredemo) of Mario Vargas Llosa, for whom he served as a personal advisor, although De Soto later distanced himself from the group. Later, De Soto advised the Fujimori regime and helped consolidate the neoliberal economic system, supported by the National Confederation of Private Business Institutions (Confiep). This latter organization was responsible for convincing investors who had become disillusioned with the economic policies of Alan García's first government.

The regime focused on economic stabilization measures, which began with the Fujishock. These reforms favoured the free market and allowed Peru to enter the international financial system. The origins of its strategy were controversial, particularly the alleged adoption of the Green Plan, known as "Plan Verde", and its similarities to the government of Manuel Odría. Economist José Oscátegui pointed out that the economic proposals were not the work of Fujimori or Vargas Llosa, but of De Soto, and asserted that there was "a self-serving legend intended to give credit to his followers (of Fujimorism)". At his 2009 trial, Fujimori argued that his measures were necessary to prevent Peru from becoming a pariah state in the financial world.

Economic measures were taken by the government such as the reintroduction of the sol as the national currency and a program of privatizations (starting in 1991). Special committees were established to oversee the transfer state-owned enterprises. According to Javier Diez Canseco, the private sector were able to hire workers from the former privatized companies. Only a few organisations survived the sale and lease to private entities, such as the Banco de la Nación and Petroperú. Some of these would become part of the National Fund for Financing State Business Activity (FONAFE), which was founded in 1999.

Parliament, which included the Democratic Front, opposed the economic measures. Fujimori responded with a self-coup in 1992, supported by the military and business leaders. This allowed him to impose deeper liberal reforms. The reforms were led by Economy Minister Carlos Boloña, who announced them during the self-coup. The self-coup began with a period of "national emergency and reconstruction," during which numerous decree laws were enacted, and concluded with the Democratic Constituent Congress, responsible for establishing the 1993 Constitution and its chapter on the social market economy. Mario Vargas Llosa criticized the 1992 self-coup, while the Neoliberal Forum (in which Vargas Llosa participated) labeled Fujimori a "neo-fascist".

In the mid-1990s, the National Institute for the Defense of Competition and the Protection of Intellectual Property (INDECOPI) were created to resolve legal issues related to the free market in the country. According to the World Bank, poverty fell from 53.5% in 1994 to 49% in 1997. Approximately 1.3 million jobs were also created, although many were of lower quality. Germán Alarco, a member of the Board of Directors of the Central Reserve Bank of Peru, noted that the rapid economic growth of 1994–1997 was comparable to that of other previous periods of economic expansion, such as those of 1922–1950 and 1952–1973.

==== Financial support ====
The State wanted to remain uninvolved in business management, but occasionally intervened if a company incurred debt. Economic reforms allowed some companies, particularly transnational corporations, to receive millions in tax benefits (such as Supreme Decree 120-94 EF), and 78 of them continued to do so in the following two decades.

In the 1995 Peruvian general election, businessman Roque Benavides said that business leaders supported Fujimori to continue enabling the private sector to operate in the country. In 1996, the Commission for the Promotion of Private Concessions was created to give companies the opportunity to work on public works projects. However, in that year, the economic reforms began to stall and were nearly declared a failure by the government. A study by American economist Erica Field indicated that countries viewed land titling programs favourably, and it was suggested that a shift to this approach be adopted to overcome the stagnation.

Since Fujimori's visit to the Asian Tigers in 1991, Southeast Asian countries had taken an interest in Peru. This prevented the neoliberal trend from failing. In 1996, during his subsequent visit to Malaysia, President Fujimori emphasized that the Peruvian state would maintain the liberal economic system and used that country's strategies as a reference. When he met with his counterpart Kim Young-sam that same year, the executive leader also noted the importance of South Korean foreign investors as "development partners".

In 1998, Peru became a member of APEC, thanks to diplomatic overtures from its partners and the support of countries that were not members of the organization. According to the Infobae, in 1992 Alberto Fujimori asked Japanese Prime Minister, Ryutaro Hashimoto, to allow Peru to join APEC, taking advantage of the fact that at that time "a moratorium had been set for new member countries until 2007". When it was on the verge of joining the forum, the country committed to further liberalizing its trade and guaranteeing investments from its partners.

==== Privatization of the extractive industry ====
The government of Alberto Fujimori prioritized investment in the mining sector. Mining companies were the main beneficiaries, as the government granted them an innovative mechanism known as the contract-law. Thanks to this contract, which cannot be modified without the permission of the operating company, the government guaranteed tax incentives for years. By 2025, 80% of the country's mining sector was controlled by 15 mining companies.

The Fujimori government sought not only the extraction of minerals, but also of other natural resources such as oil, hen operated by Petroperú, and the future natural gas, operated by a transnational corporation. In 1993, the Hydrocarbons Law (Law 26221) was enacted to facilitate private sector participation in hydrocarbon exploration and exploitation activities. By 1996, Petroperú (not to be confused with Perupetro, responsible for authorizing hydrocarbon lands) had already ceased exploiting these resources and was only engaged in fuel refining, while Fujimori unsuccessfully attempted to privatize the entire industry. The Gestión website reported that daily oil production had decreased in contrast to natural gas production: from 120,000 barrels in 1996 to 62,000 in 2013.

==== Service providers ====
In 1999, politician Gustavo Mohme indicated that the government wanted to privatize public services. It became known that water resources could not be privatized due to a lack of support from the World Bank. Instead, an alternative was created: the water and sanitation service provider (EPS). Thus, the State could continue operating with neoliberal policies, but at a higher cost. In 2024, the Ministry of Housing stated that the EPSs did not have enough money to operate and maintain their infrastructure.

In the area of drinking water and sanitation, water and sanitation service providers (WSPs) were created with a majority stake held by municipalities in the long term, while the private sector assumed a minority role. In 2017, at least 50 WSPs covered 18.6 million urban residents, of whom 16.5 million had access to drinking water and 14.9 million had a sewer connection. These services were criticized for lacking autonomy in making their own financial decisions. In the health sector, the private sector took over the care of more people. The social security institution Seguro Social de Salud del Perú (EsSalud) was exempt from privatization.

==== Social and labour changes ====
The middle class suffered marginalization as a consequence of the elimination of some labor rights and the lack of employment during the Fujimori government.CITEREFDíaz_Albertini2001 Mario Zolezzi (2003) described how, under that government, “the traditional middle classes were impoverished, a portion of the industrial bourgeoisie and medium-sized business owners were hit hard, and the state bureaucracy of the lowest income levels was significantly reduced, replaced by a much smaller one, with high-income niches and contracts worth thousands of dollars". When the economy recovered from the Asian financial crisis in 2004, the middle class represented 46% of the population of Lima.

The neoliberal project led to a labour restructuring imposed by a supreme decree in 1991. The labor restructuring provoked reactions from workers, partly due to the lack of job security in the public sector. Workers sued the State for violating agreements with the International Labour Organization. The newspaper La República estimated that by the year 2000 more than half a million employees had been laid off without receiving any compensation for their jobs.

In 1990, the Ecasa Workers' Union filed an injunction with the Court of Justice requesting the non-application of two decrees. According to the union, the decrees violated a collective bargaining agreement, but the process took several years. In 2002, the leaders of the Intersectoral Confederation of State Workers requested the reinstatement of jobs eliminated since 1992. Subsequently, in 2014, the Inter-American Court of Human Rights (Corte IDH) declared Peru responsible for violating the labor rights of 164 public employees dismissed between 1996 and 1998.

In 2025, the Dina Boluarte administration passed a bill allowing former employees who had been irregularly dismissed to receive financial benefits and be reinstated or reassigned to their positions, without retroactive effect. These benefits were based on the prevailing minimum wage and did not exclude individuals who had received other benefits under previous administrations.

==== Asian crisis and possible decline ====
In 2000, analyst Roberto Abusada stated in an IPE publication that the neoliberal reforms implemented between 1992 and 1997, prior to the Asian financial crisis, were not properly implemented and, instead, the central government suffered its own crisis. According to Juan José Marthans, this economic and political crisis was worse than that of the early 1990s. Economist Félix Jiménez noted that in 1999, social conflict over poverty, exacerbated by the recession, was added to the mix. Peru had to cope with economic problems, including the Asian financial crisis, by establishing ties with other countries. These relationships continued in the following years.

In 2000, at the height of the political crisis, Fujimori proposed new "urgent" decrees to reverse the economic measures. He wanted to focus on addressing the needs of society and improving his image for the upcoming elections. But business leaders rejected proposals such as the elimination of taxes for the mining sector. Foreign investors became less interested in the country. Faced with business uncertainty, Fujimori reinstated Carlos Boloña as Minister of Economy.

=== Renewal of neoliberal policy and the Lima consensus ===
According to sociologist Martín Tanaka, Peru experienced a period of relative institutional stability between 2001 and 2016, a continuation of the conservative-leaning neoliberal order established by the Fujimori regime in the 1990s. Political scientist Alberto Vergara noted that this period was largely outside the control of Alberto Fujimori's government while unfolding democratically. However, the 2002 National Accord implicitly maintained Fujimori's neoliberal model.

The interim government of Valentín Paniagua, between 2000 and 2001, was subject to the Confiep, which urged respect for the points agreed upon in the Letter of Intent of the International Monetary Fund and abstention from intervening in the country's private economy. The organization's representative, Roque Benavides, warned that any attempt to affect the country's banking stability would be considered an "act of financial terrorism".

The government of Alejandro Toledo, who succeeded Paniagua, focused on restructuring public institutions, including the Private Investment Promotion Agency (ProInversión) and the National Labor Council (to promote the reactivation of the labor sector). Alejandro Toledo favored continuing privatization. One of the measures involved the sale of electricity companies. This measure sparked protests in the south of the country, where these entities were slated to be auctioned. The government also proposed privatizing Lima's water company, Sedapal, but this did not materialize. The money obtained from privatization was allocated to the health and education sectors, with the aim of improving the population's quality of life.

As the Washington Consensus gradually weakened throughout the 2000s, the Lima Consensus emerged informally. The term was coined by political scientist Steven Levitsky to identify the relevance of Peruvian power groups, characterized by promoting a more orthodox stance than the previous one. In this scenario, Alan García, who served as president of the republic between 2006 and 2011, took neoliberal ideology to its extreme, facilitating land exports and encouraging the reception of foreign investment without restrictions. These actions met with initial rejection from the National Confederation of Private Business Institutions, due to their scepticism regarding his previous government (1985-1990).

Alan García's second government resumed the Fujimori-era growth strategy, focused on the primary sectors. In this context, he promoted the reduction of labor costs to boost export competitiveness, a policy criticized by his detractors with the term "cheap cholo" (a derogatory term for indigenous people). According to economist Félix Jiménez, this strategy of lowering labor costs reversed a "timid shift" toward productive diversification that had been attempted during Alejandro Toledo's government. At the same time, while implementing these policies, García gave speeches against poverty and reshuffled his cabinet with ministers aligned with his ideological stance.

In the 2000s, the Lima Consensus emerged simultaneously with the commodities boom of that decade. The period of prosperity that Peru was experiencing allowed it to increase the size of its economy through the intensive extraction of essential resources and to diversify the minerals being extracted, while the population achieved higher levels of purchasing power thanks to access to lines of financial credit. The success was compared to the 1950s.

It is worth noting that, in 2004, the National Society of Industries was concerned about the "mercantilist" interests of companies dependent on the export of these goods. As early as 2009, analyst Carlos Adrianzén indicated that, as in the Fujimori government, Peruvian institutions were not strengthened nor were educational and financial reforms implemented to guarantee a higher return on income.

=== Lack of representativeness and decline ===
==== Political crisis of 2016-2020 ====
Towards the end of the 2010s, Fujimorism faced Pedro Pablo Kuczynski, a president with a background at the 1989 Washington Summit who adopted neoliberal positions in office. Kuczynski's main source of support was young sympathizers who defended this system when he ran as a candidate in 2011. At that time, the only aim was to improve the wealth distribution system and the efficiency of resource acquisition.

This dispute was marked by a new political crisis (from 2016 to 2020), during which, following Kuczynski's resignation, there was no representative capable of addressing the discrediting of the Executive Branch and other institutions of the country. Economists Bruno Seminario and Pedro Francke, researcher Marina Mendoza and professor Fernando Villarán asserted that the 2010s would mark the end of neoliberalism. In 2020, manager Ricardo Montero stated that neoliberalism had reached its limit because Peruvians had lost interest in developing formal businesses.

==== COVID-19 pandemic ====
We mistakenly call them "neoliberals"; they are actually "conservatives." They were called that (in the United States) because they were liberals who switched to the conservative sector, and that's why they were called neoliberals, but that's just one episode of the Reagan administration. [...] If we were to transfer the political and electoral debates that take place in the United States to Peru (because of ideology), here their [opposition] leaders would appear as communists because they are constantly talking about social security, pensions, education, health, and services. [The defenders] accept that certain aspects of the Washington Consensus are sacrosanct.

— Enrique Zileri, in a 1999 interview for La República about the political situation in the event of new general elections.

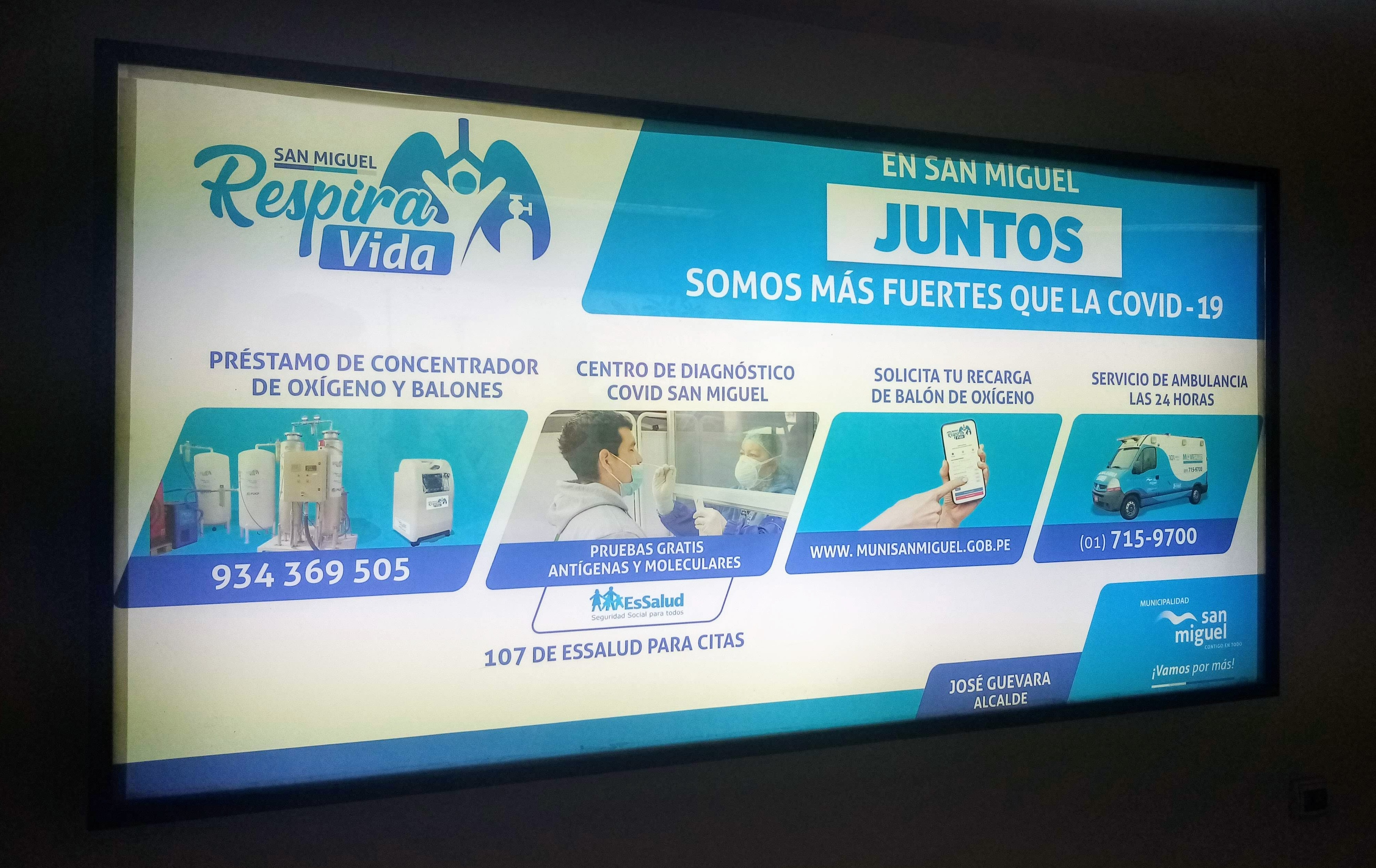
The COVID-19 pandemic hit Peru in 2020 and impacted to economy.

With the COVID-19 pandemic in the country, one of the consequences was the reduction of the middle class, which went from 14 million people in 2019 to almost 8 million in 2021. There was also a financial loss for companies: 75% of them stopped paying their debts on time in 2021. Between 2020 and 2022, 300,000 formal companies registered losses and continued to carry debts until 2025.

Some financial institutions and medical clinics, even those supported by the State to avoid bankruptcy, were unable to serve the most needy. Private universities demanded monthly fees for distance learning due to COVID-19 restrictions, prompting SUNEDU to demand transparency.

The economist Pedro Francke stated that when the country was hit by the COVID-19 pandemic, a considerable portion of the Peruvian population neglected their health and relied on in-person employment to earn a living and survive. The government of Martín Vizcarra fought the pandemic despite staff shortages and social inequality. As a result, Peru had one of the worst pandemic managements in the world.

During the COVID-19 pandemic, it became clear that social services for the population were not free. The Peruvian government attempted to offer free, mass services, but failed due to opposition from Confiep, which feared expropriation. The lack of success of free social assistance led the State to grant economic subsidies to the vulnerable population, but these were distributed exclusively in person at government offices, exposing the population to infection.

==== Political crisis since 2021 and a new economic crisis ====
The presidential candidacy of Pedro Castillo, Keiko Fujimori's rival, alarmed neoliberal supporters. When economic issues, such as public spending, were discussed, some companies managed by the Romero and Brescia families withdrew their investments before the second round. Economist Alonso Segura stated in the newspaper Gestión that Castillo's proposals were not well-received by private investment and compared them to the economic measures of Alan García's first government. The fear that Castillo would seek to substantially modify the economic system did not materialize because he lacked the necessary capacity to do so.

When Pedro Castillo was elected president in 2021, triggering a new political crisis between the Executive and Legislature, social problems continued to worsen. Economist Hernando de Soto, who ran for president that same year, described Castillo's cabinet as a "Confiep of terrucos". The "Empresarios Unidos por el Perú" coalition, made up of 197 national business associations, guilds, and conglomerates, expressed its rejection of a proposed constituent assembly in 2022 put forward by Castillo.

Dina Boluarte replaced Pedro Castillo as president in December 2022, after he was dismissed. The president of the Central Reserve Bank of Peru (BCRP), Julio Velarde, said that this made businesspeople less afraid of such "radicalism". Analyst Farid Kahhat noted that Boluarte wanted to reach out to investors. Her strategy, called an "investment shock," was supported by the Inter-American Development Bank. Boluarte took credit for Julio Velarde's achievements in addressing a potential economic crisis and tried to form a cabinet that reflected neoliberal concepts. The executive and legislative branches were allied and both encouraged the promotion of pro-investment bills. One of the parties involved was Fuerza Popular, which drafted Law 31903 for economic reactivation. Fuerza Popular had as a member a businessman who had supported the theory of alleged electoral fraud and was in charge of promoting the school construction and investment sector.

The beginning of Boluarte's term coincided with social upheaval, which intensified the political crisis, with some supporters demanding a new constitution. Political scientist and professor at Antonio Ruiz de Montoya University and also at the Pontifical Catholic University of Peru, Alonso Cárdenas, noted that the political elite blocked citizens' demands with terrorist campaigns. One of the departments that experienced protests was Puno, where activity was reduced to a quarter of that of previous years. The Juliaca massacre, perpetrated by police, occurred in this department on 9 January 2023.

In 2023, the country experienced its worst financial crisis since the 1997 Asian financial crisis. Economic development stagnated, and the middle class shrank in Lima and Callao, falling from 60% in 2019 to 47% in 2023 (although it is suggested that it reached 40% in 2025), representing a decrease of 1.2 million people. It had been projected that, had the crisis not occurred, 70 percent of the population would be middle class by 2030. A study by the Institute of Economics and Business Development of the Lima Chamber of Commerce indicated that more than 50% of the national working middle class had no opportunities to formalize their employment. One of the causes of the financial crisis was the persistence of economic pessimism during Boluarte's administration. The economist Kurt Burneo attributed it to the struggle between the powers of the State. The Institute for Economic and Social Studies indicated in its study that seven out of ten business owners did not plan to make investments in the last months of the year.

China became Peru's main investment partner thanks to its "friendly" treatment, in the words of one of its diplomats. Chinese mining companies played a significant role in the country's mineral market, and their activity generated substantial economic benefits. These companies were often exempt from taxes. By 2024, China controlled a fifth of the South American country's mines and 200 of its companies operated there in mining and other sectors. By 2025, one in three imported containers came from China.

In 2024, Boluarte announced new measures to continue extracting minerals and hydrocarbons in her State of the Nation address, downplaying the importance of social license and environmental protection. This contrasted from the anti-extractive promises made during Pedro Castillo's campaign, claiming that only a few people supported those policies. The following year, the Ministry of Economy and Finance launched a shock of private sector deregulation, raw materials, and a "not a penny more for Petroperú" policy aimed at increasing the percentage of GDP. The first group of 402 measures focused primarily on eliminating bureaucratic barriers (186 of them). At that time, private companies spent one billion soles on the construction of public works. At the end of 2025, José Jerí, Boluarte's successor, stated before CADE Executives that he was preparing a new "debureaucratization shock".

== Postures ==
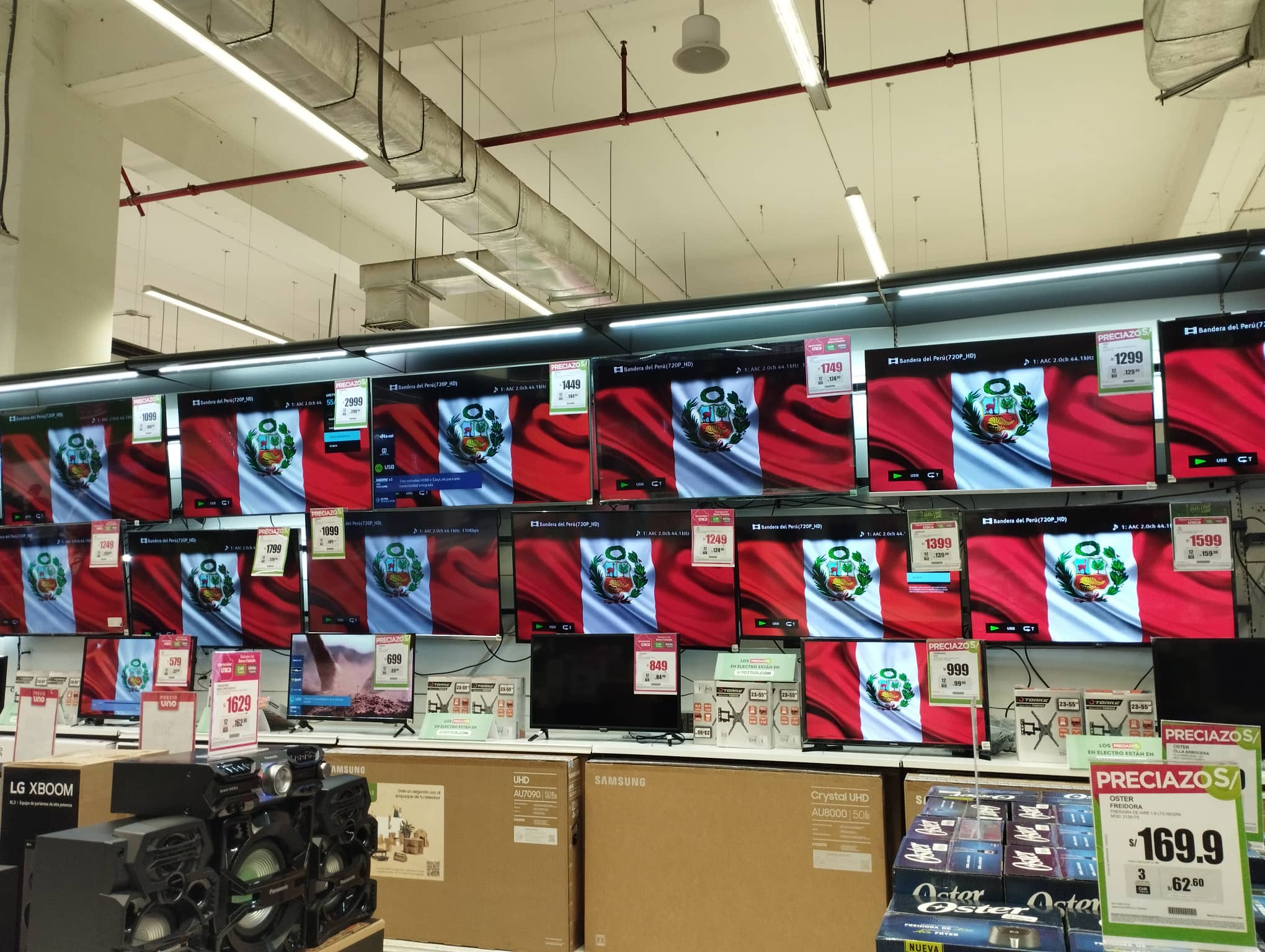
A branch of the Tottus supermarket chain located in Lima, where televisions are sold while the Peruvian flag is projected onto the facade of the store.

Peruvian neoliberalism is characterized by its individualism and egocentrism, and adopts classic concepts of the ideology. One of its manifestations is the "existentialist discourse," which became established in the social culture during the 1990s and is compared to "pendejada", a Peruvian expression related to viveza criolla (a kind of cunning or shrewdness). Narratively, it establishes that the country depends on a political community made up of individuals (whether businesspeople or members of trade associations), who "must become wealthy" to achieve the progress of Peruvians and thus gain their leadership in the country's decision-making. It is known that the media have been key instruments in perpetuating the promises of neoliberalism.

Historically, in Peru, even the projects of liberals in the early republican years maintained colonial patterns that granted the State a central role in the creation of wealth and well-being. According to historian Franklin Pease García Yrigoyen, after independence from the Spanish Empire, the nation did not promote private enterprise and maintained a monopolistic and centralized State. Overseas merchants, considered representatives of economic liberalism, quickly adapted to the conservative traditions of doing business.

The neoliberal policies of Francisco Morales Bermúdez and Fernando Belaúnde, lead to a rejection of the political right by voters, who punished it at the polls during the 1980s, as their policies were considered a failure for the country's economy. The neoliberalism of Hernando de Soto, which initially developed within the New Right movement, where Mario Vargas Llosa emerged, opted to discard traditional right-wing ideas and shift the focus from large corporations to the popular and informal sectors. De Soto's project succeeded thanks to its implementation by Fujimori, who managed to dismantle the legacy of Juan Velasco Alvarado's government. The then-minister Carlos Boloña acknowledged that "populist," socialist", or "mercantilist" governments had dominated the country between 1970 and 1990. The cooperative members (Movimiento cooperativo), one of the main figures of the Velasco regime, saw the conversion of their lands into businesses and their individual distribution as the only possible option, which complies with the neoliberal legal logic of privileging individual rights in the market.

In his work El otro sendero, Hernando de Soto denounced the presence of an interventionist state in the market and described the transformation of informal citizenship that challenged this bureaucratic state. The work generated controversy for disseminating mercantilist ideas that were not explained in depth. Specialists such as Carlos Iván Degregori, Cecilia Blondet and Nicolás Lynch Gamero categorized his vision as "neoconservative" in nature, due to the rights it would apply to workers in the informal sector (one of the most relevant in the country's precarious labour system). Analyst Carlos Alberto Adrianzén stated that this work was important in bringing businesspeople closer to political power.

Under Alberto Fujimori's government, many measures were based on the Washington Consensus, which focused economically on deregulation and privatization with the aim of shifting the state towards a neoliberal economy. The Congress of the Republic supported the promotion of a neoliberal state. Certain positions received the approval of the National Confederation of Private Business Institutions (Confiep), an economic group focused on economic policies, where its director, Jorge Camet, assumed the position of Minister of Economy (succeeding Boloña).

In the 21st century, neoliberalism was more welcomed by newer conservative groups because of its ability to obtain resources in exchange for carrying out megaprojects. Gestión columnist Elena Conterno, citing Waldo Mendoza Bellido, noted that private investment and trade liberalization were the true engine of upward social mobility in the country since 2004. Furthermore, based on the words of Gabriel Amaro, she stated that the agro-industrial sector has become Peru's most successful social program.

Among the defenders of the neoliberal state is Confiep, a business association formed by prominent business leaders such as Dionisio Romero Paoletti. However, some business leaders left Confiep and in 2020 formed the Union of Trade Associations of Peru (UGP), in which they put forward different positions, such as the social market economy. Francisco Durand points out that the members of Confiep (which was formed at its core by bankers and miners, and which had been losing some of its original members since 1998) and the UGP had different perspectives. Even so, in 2025, several members of the UGP, such as the National Society of Industries, accused non-governmental organizations of discouraging private investment.

=== Policies ===
Within the framework of Fujimori's state reform, economist Carlos Matus described the introduction of "technopoliticians," technocrats who possessed a different perspective and promoted democratic values and the satisfaction of citizens' demands. According to Alberto Vergara, in the 1990s political parties collapsed and gave rise to a generation of amateur politicians. These non-party amateur politicians could not compete with the experienced corps of neoliberal technocrats operating within the state.

The sociologist Agustín Haya de la Torre concluded that politics had been invaded by the business and commercial world. Parliamentarians elected by the new parties largely represent private interests. Cabinets are dominated by businesspeople, and decisions are based primarily on a cost-benefit approach, prioritizing financial results over republican values. The newspaper La República stated that, at the 2000 CADE Ejecutivos conference, business leaders became interested in politics after Alberto Fujimori's absence from the event. Twenty-four years later, at another CADE conference, leaders planned to discuss political reform following the absence of President Dina Boluarte, according to one of them, because Boluarte's absence "doesn't bother us".

The author Francisco Miró-Quesada Rada pointed out the existence of "corporate parties," led by businessmen with caudillo-like and oligarchic qualities. Furthermore, specialist Steven Levitsky stated in 2020 that pure political parties did not exist, and that what existed were "franchises rented to people to get into Congress and make money or do business". This argument was shared by Percy Medina, head of the Peruvian chapter of the International Institute for Democracy and Electoral Assistance.

=== Proprietary ===
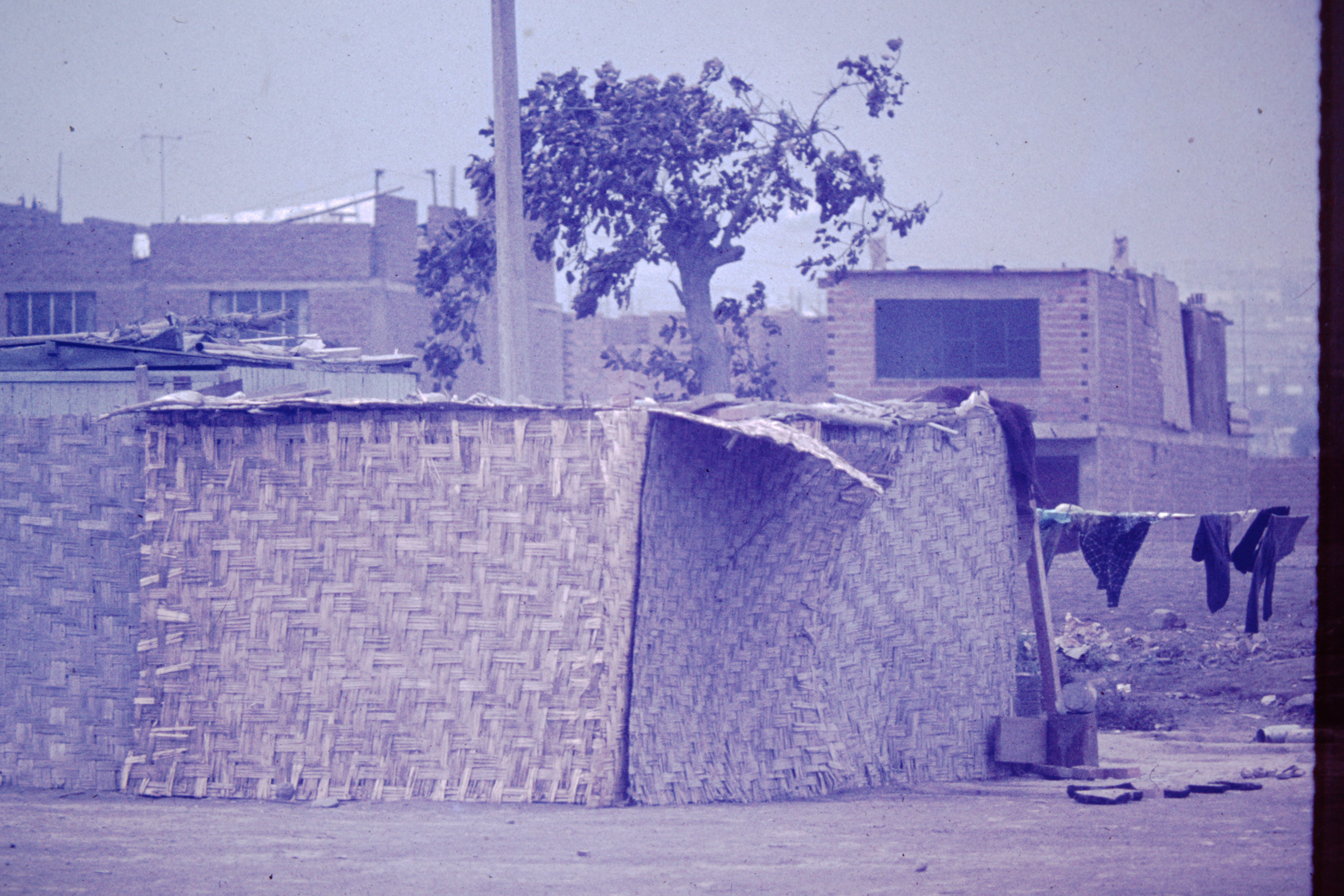
A house with mats in the then shantytown of Villa el Salvador. Photograph from 1975.

The formalization of property ownership was proposed by Hernando de Soto in 1988 and implemented in 1996, following approval from the World Bank and the government of Alberto Fujimori. Fujimori's government eliminated the mutual housing system, which facilitated the growth of urban land without a regulatory process. In 1996, Legislative Decree No. 803 was enacted, establishing the formalization of private property ownership in housing as a matter of public interest and creating the Commission for the Formalization of Informal Property (Cofopri). Years later, in 2020, Law 31056 was passed, establishing deadlines for titling territories occupied by informal settlements before December 2015, a measure controversial for encouraging land trafficking.

Additionally, the Agricultural Investment Law (1991) permitted the purchase and sale of agricultural land (prohibited since the Peruvian Agrarian Reform). This law was followed by another, the Titling of Peasant Communities of the Coast (1996), to guarantee trade from large estates. Since 2019, the Metropolitan Municipality of Lima has been responsible for the formalization of properties in agricultural areas within its jurisdiction.

De Soto had a vision regarding the birth, growth, and persistence of new housing built without adequate planning, due to legal and institutional systems incapable of defining and recognizing property rights generated by situations not contemplated by formal institutions. He believed that offering legal security over land would allow one to "give the poor the tools to rise up".

De Soto was also familiar with the behavior outside urban areas and understood that Indigenous peoples do not live in a paradise where everything belongs to everyone and private rights are unnecessary. On the contrary, “for better or for worse, Amazonian natives have begun a transition to the market". Regarding mining, “a good part is informal, [because] it is not clear who owns the property, although specialists like Manuel Pulgar-Vidal disagreed with his views. In 2015, De Soto stated that artisanal miners also engaged in agriculture. In 2024, the economist pointed out that companies operating in small-scale mining were affected by the impact on their operations when the COVID-19 pandemic hit. Therefore, entrepreneurs who resorted to loans instead of capitalizing their land have precipitated their collapse.

=== Labor ===
The Lima Consensus is powerful. It wields almost veto power over economic policy. [...] [After the failure of his first government], [former president] Alan García completely forgot about his social democratic past and embraced conservative orthodoxy with fervor. [His successor], [Ollanta] Humala, defeated by the Lima Consensus in 2006 and badly beaten by it in the first round of 2011, adapted as well. [...] For the economic right, the Lima Consensus is the most effective "guarantor" of continuity [neoliberal in the 1990s]. [However], the Lima Consensus does not represent a majority of the Peruvian electorate.

— Steven Levitsky, in a column in La República on the term Lima consensus.

Social rights in Peru have been influenced by coups d'état perpetrated by authoritarian elites. Alberto Fujimori used the state to redefine social rights and create a neoliberal social citizenship, whose rights are subject to market supply and demand. These definitions were established in a new 1992 law that simplified the regulation of collective labor relations, a subject that had been legislated in the past but not standardized. Fujimori's steps were followed by other presidents such as Dina Boluarte.

A common practice among companies is outsourcing (labor intermediation or, by its anglicism, "services"), which by 2022 had already been used by 86% of Peruvian companies. This practice intensified during the Fujimori regime, when the State incorporated healthcare personnel under the category of "non-personal services". According to the website Pasión por el Derecho, "non-personal services" and "service contracts" were the recognized methods for years to reduce labor costs. Outsourcing was criticized by members of Congress such as Dora Núñez Dávila in 2001, who proposed eliminating this practice from the legislation. In 2022, Pedro Castillo issued a supreme decree that was later temporarily recognized by the Constitutional Court to prevent subcontracting in the core business, as in the case of the company Lima Airport Partners.

Fujimori's regime caused trade unions to lose influence. They had been important in the 1970s, but in the following decade they were no longer so. Although in theory the 1993 Constitution only recognized the right to form trade unions (more limited than in the 1979 Constitution), in practice workers were prevented from unionizing in companies. A survey conducted in 2004 by the University of Lima revealed that only 5% of workers were affiliated with trade unions, which were going through an identity crisis regarding the defense of Labor rights. It was believed that the problem of "labor peace" had been solved without trade unions. But no thought was given to the problems that could arise in the company or in the productive sector.

Workers in these companies adopted a new social security system (Private Pension System, SPP), which introduced Pension fund administrators (AFPs), operated by the private sector. This measure was initially rejected by labor movements and denounced by some workers who were forced to join.

In 1998, the Ministry of Transport and Communications (ENAPU) reported that union density had decreased significantly due to labor reforms implemented by the government of Alberto Fujimori. These reforms granted employers the power to outsource up to 90% of their workforce by contracting service companies, cooperatives, and youth training programs.

Changes in labor regulations during the Fujimori regime led the Congressional Labor and Social Security Commission to establish new rules in 2001 to protect workers from dismissal. The General Confederation of Workers of Peru supported these changes, while the Association of Exporters (ADEX) rejected them. Subsequently, the government of Ollanta Humala created the National Superintendency of Labor Inspection to prevent employers from committing irregularities. In the 2020s, new labor unions emerged in large companies, such as those at the canales de televisión América (SutramericaTV) and Latina.

In 2019, the National Competitiveness Plan was developed, focusing on formalization, which was criticized by unions for prioritizing competitiveness over labor rights. In 2021, Agenda 19, a proposal by economist Íber Maraví (from the Pedro Castillo administration) to strengthen labor rights, was implemented after supposedly reaching an agreement with business leaders. The Lima Chamber of Commerce opposed Agenda 19, arguing that it would limit private sector activity from an "ideologically driven perspective". In 2022, regulations for strengthening unions were officially enacted.

In 2023, the government of Dina Boluarte, with Minister Alex Contreras at the helm, announced the reversal of the Agenda 19 measures. In 2025, the repeal of two decrees that limited subcontracting and established labor benefits began. In 2026, the Constitutional Court ruled to eliminate the decrees that prohibited subcontracting within the core operations of companies.

=== Judiciary ===
In the judicial sphere, investors criticized the Peruvian legal system for its excessive formalism and the lack of trust in its officials regarding dispute resolution In 1997, it was pointed out by business leaders that the administration of justice was largely in the hands of judges from lower socioeconomic backgrounds and with less training. As a result, more powerful businesspeople adopted alternative measures, such as arbitration. According to Professor Wilfredo Ardito Vega, the use of these non-state legal mechanisms to resolve disputes highlighted the difficulties faced by rural sectors in defending their rights against businesspeople.

In 2024, the Peruvian government challenged arbitration centers by establishing a new regulation requiring them to register with a national registry of the Ministry of Justice (called "Renace"). The law was intended to provide citizens with information to make more informed decisions about this dispute resolution system. According to information provided by Infobae, parties, especially businesspeople, would have difficulty choosing their preferred arbitrator. By 2025, Peru was the third most sued country before the International Centre for Settlement of Investment Disputes (ICSID) in South America and one of those with the highest number of cases worldwide, with 26 pending proceedings.

=== Welfare providers ===
While Hernando de Soto envisioned serving the population through private property, (Note: Hernando de Soto already reflected the need to attend to the population in his book '"El otro sendero". In this book he proposed that citizens identify with the neoliberal current, own their property and have power over their own identity.) Alberto Fujimori employed a social assistance policy. This policy was influenced by neo-populist currents. It consisted of technocrats, who dominated the political debate, and populist figures tasked with addressing the government's needs, albeit without significant government representation. Among these needs were community kitchens, which garnered interest from several political candidates in 2000. Towards the end of the 1990s, proposals from both technocrats and populist figures were well received by the government.

The 1993 Constitution limited state intervention, focusing public spending on areas where there had been opposition or abstention in the previous referendum. Fujimori implemented a social welfare system, inaugurated services, and acted as the main social supporter, which was described as "neopopulism". In his early years, donations came from foreign entities managed by his relatives. The government strongly opposed any attempt to transfer funds to give municipalities financial autonomy. Among the institutions founded or centralized by Alberto Fujimori with international cooperation are:

- The National Food Assistance Program (Pronaa, renamed Qali Warma), which was intended to benefit government suppliers, such as farmers and mothers.
- The National Compensation and Social Development Fund (Foncodes), directed by the Minister of the Presidency, Jaime Yoshiyama, and dedicated to social works.
- The National Watershed Management and Soil Conservation Project (Pronamachcs), (Note: Pronamachcs was created in 1981 in agreement with the Inter-American Development Agency, to serve about 236 thousand people in poverty through the 6250 peasant organizations at more than two thousand meters above sea level.) an important program for providing water (because it was not privatized) to peasant families in the Peruvian highlands. The newspaper La República denounced that the beneficiaries of Pronamachcs, mostly living in poverty, were used by the government for political purposes.

At the 1995 Beijing Conference, the government of President Alberto Fujimori expressed its intention to promote social inclusion initiatives in collaboration with international and feminist organizations. The aim was for social programs to promote the individual “development” of women so that they could fulfill the mission of serving their communities. In practice, women received few privileges within the conservative vision, since the government was not interested in eliminating economic inequality. Researcher Maruja Barrig noted that the executive branch in the 1990s focused on maximizing the capital of those who participated in social initiatives such as gender equality or women's empowerment.

Indigenous communities, which were ignored in the Beijing discourse, were only given a secretariat and lacked explicit recognition in the constitution. According to scholar Luis Reyes Lostaunau, it was ultimately urban workers who primarily benefited from the welfare policy, to the detriment of Peru's rural and disadvantaged populations.

Few presidents like Valentín Paniagua prevented the central government from continuing to manipulate social welfare institutions. However, after Paniagua, neoliberal populist policies continued, becoming the norm in the governments of Alejandro Toledo, Alan García, and Ollanta Humala.

In 2025, the Salud con lupa website noted a “lack of commitment from major social programs, such as Wasi Mikuna (due to the restructuring of Qali Warma), Cuna Más, and Vaso de Leche, as well as from food supplementation programs managed by municipalities.” The website stated that processed foods were being prioritized over products from family farms. At that time, the Ministry of Agriculture was granting licenses to various groups to sell food from family farms to the State.

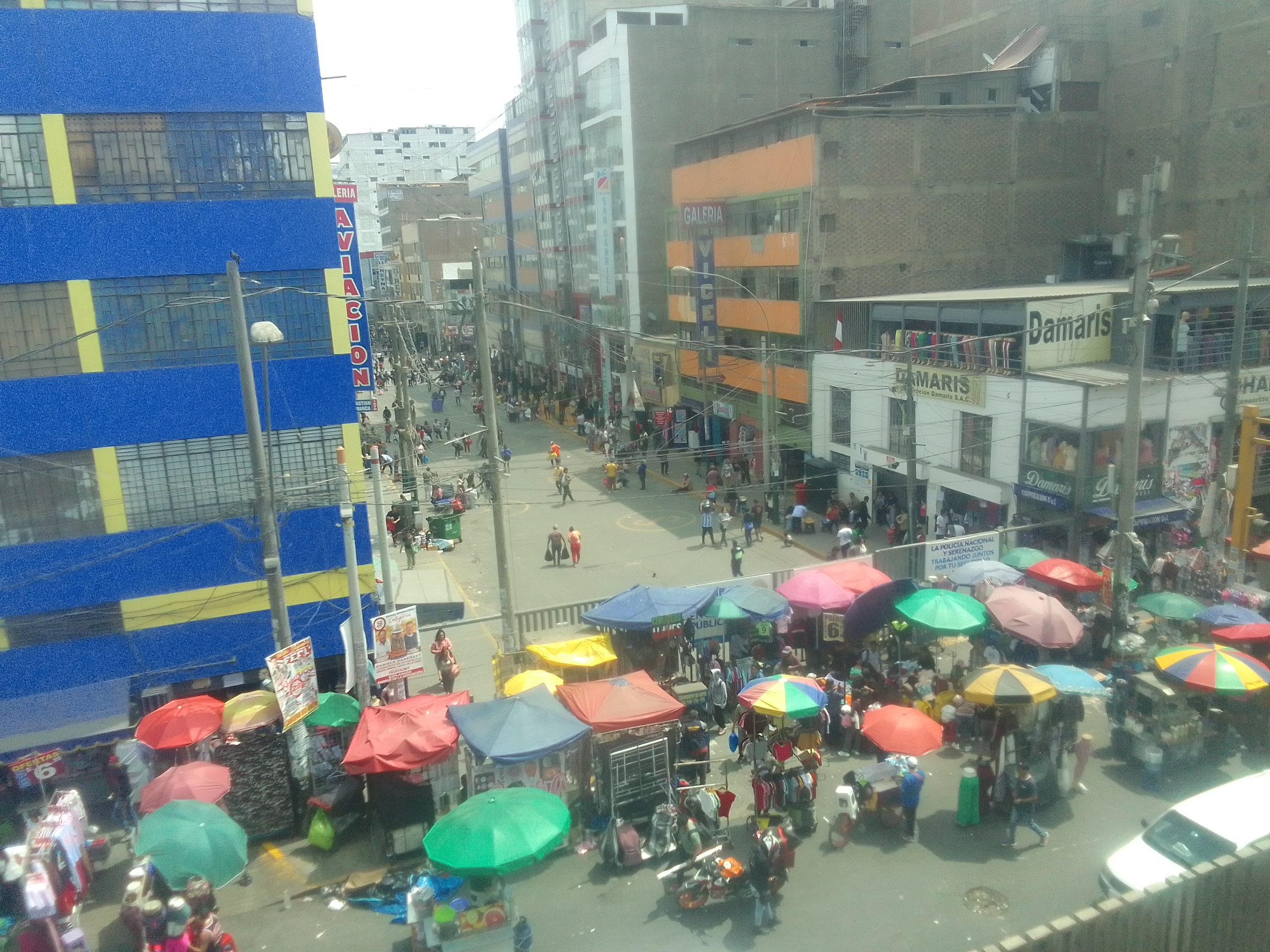
The Gamarra Commercial Emporium stands as a crucial center for the promotion of textile entrepreneurship in Lima. It concentrates 70% of national garment production.

In Peru, it has been observed that the State promoted a spirit of productivity locally rather than fostering employment. According to the Global Entrepreneurship Monitor report, in 2024 it had the highest per capita ratio of inhabitants per business, with one business for every 13 inhabitants. The Emporio Comercial de Gamarra , which houses 99% small businesses, is an example of entrepreneurship driven by emerging entrepreneurs, many of them from humble backgrounds. According to Andina, 3,000 micro-enterprises were formed there every year in 2013.

Small and medium-sized enterprises (SMEs) were officially recognized in 1991 under the Law for the Promotion of Micro and Small Enterprises (Legislative Decree 705). This law required SMEs to formalize their businesses through the Simplified Municipal License Application, which included a sworn statement and a copy of the single registration certificate. Prior to this legislation, microenterprises were typically family-run. According to a study by Alternativa (1997), approximately half of all SMEs were run by a single person. The same study revealed that owners worked between 10 and 12 hours a day, six or seven days a week.

SMEs became a fundamental part of the national economy, representing around 90% of the business fabric in 2023. In that year, SMEs employed 46% of the active population (8.5 million people), a figure that has undergone remarkable evolution, although far from the 75% it had in 1997. In 2021, an association of small business guilds obtained a seat on the Executive Committee of the National Confederation of Private Business Institutions.

During the COVID-19 pandemic in 2020, 250,000 businesses were created, mostly sole proprietorships, with five new businesses being formed for every one that ceased operations. According to the Small Business Guild of the Lima Chamber of Commerce, in 2023, seven out of ten new businesses in the capital were led by women.

One of the distinctive features of the population is the "criollada", which reproduces one of the traits of oligarchic culture and is characterized by prioritizing personal and manipulative gain over morality or social norms. A 2022 study by the Newman Graduate School suggested that the country's businesspeople adopted resourceful social skills, a product of "criollada," to rise in national and international circles. In addition to this social trait, new ideas related to business ethics and collective collaboration emerged, as indicated by a 2020 study from the Pontifical Catholic University of Valparaíso.

=== Incentives ===
From 1992 onward, emerging entrepreneurs became a target of attention for traditional banks. Economist Félix Jiménez noted that when the economy grew significantly thanks to foreign investment in primary sectors (1993–1997), banks opted to dollarize their portfolios in order to offer credit to local businesses.

Several initiatives were undertaken to promote a corporate approach among new businesses. One of these, in 2002, was supported by the Peruvian Institute of Business Administration (Zegel) to provide training. In 2004, the "Buy Peruvian" campaign was established, aiming to promote products manufactured by local companies and encourage their appreciation by Peruvian society with a view to exporting them. This campaign was supported by brands such as Wong and had new editions in 2009 and 2020.

In 2023, Congress approved regulations to promote economic benefits for young people (up to 29 years old) who want to start their own businesses. These benefits include tax reductions and preferential treatment as small businesses.

=== State support ===
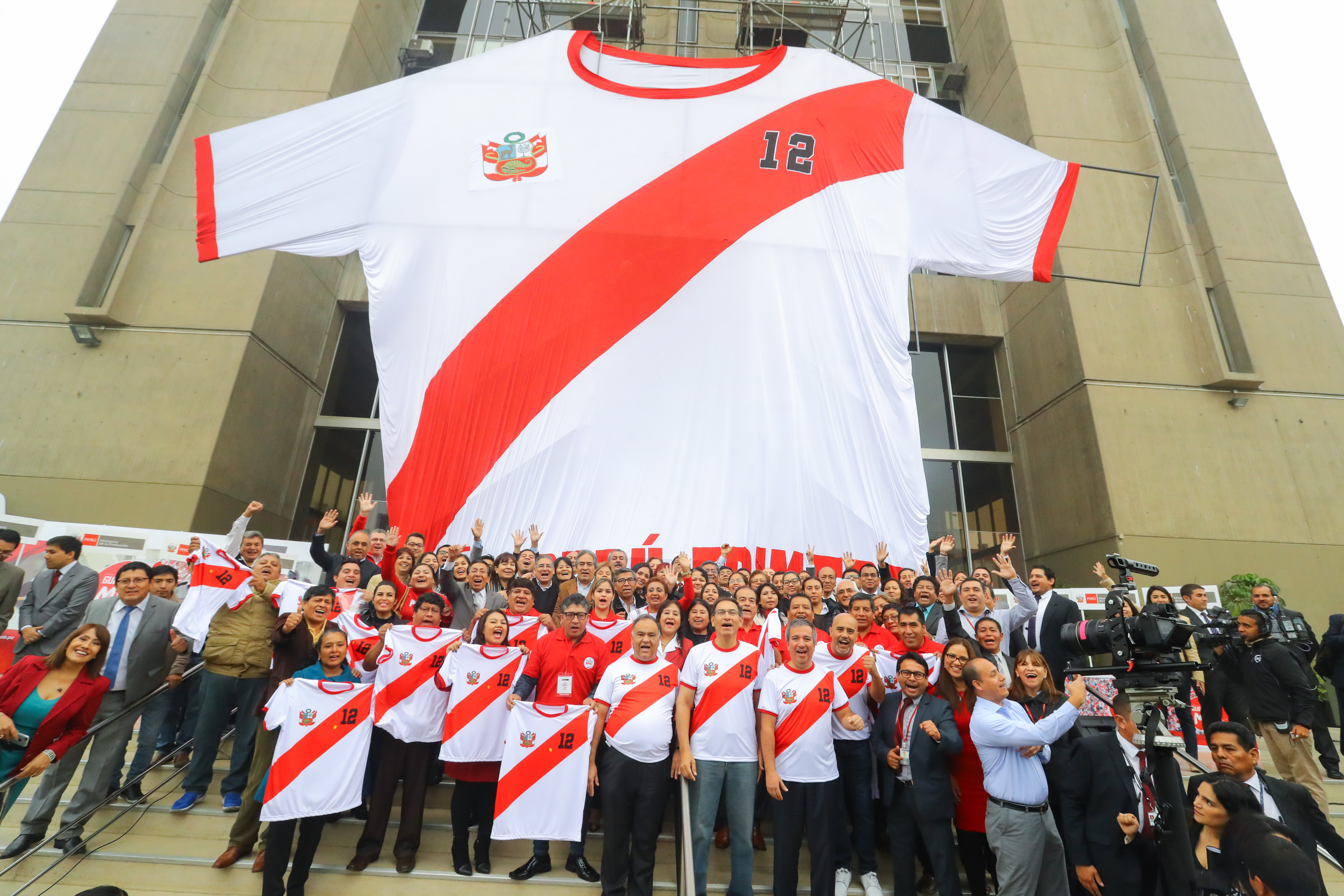
Micro and small business owners from Jirón Gamarra, and the districts of Ate and San Juan de Lurigancho promoting the campaign to produce national soccer team t-shirts.

When the law was made official in 1992, the State carried out various campaigns to encourage collaboration between SME entrepreneurs and their organizations.

In 2020, the Ministry of Production took over the Programa Compras a MYPErú (Purchases from MYPErú Program), which was created with the objective of permanently promoting business with micro and small enterprises. However, in 2024, trade association leader René Cobeña expressed his disagreement with the program's performance. According to Cobeña, the program had not executed any budget and its Purchasing Implementation Units (NECs) lacked government funding, including from the Ministry of Production, which was under the presidency of Dina Boluarte at the time of the criticism. These criticisms coincide with the complaints of other trade association leaders, who observed that emerging companies from Lima were concentrating most of the allocated quotas, to the detriment of regional micro and small enterprises.

== Extractive dependence ==
Some say I'm from Patria Roja, others say I'm from Confiep (because of the overly pro-business and close-knit stance), so in reality that shows that there are different interests and perceptions that need to be listened to.

— María Antonieta Alva, Minister of Economy in the government of Martín Vizcarra, speaking about her political ideology.

Neoliberalism in Peru was characterized by a strong dependence on the extraction of raw materials and by granting businesses the same rights as peasant and indigenous communities. Although artisanal mining predominated in the past, Gregoria Casas denounced that the government of Alberto Fujimori promoted the massive installation of heavy machinery, which had devastating environmental and social consequences. By the 2020s, artisanal miners had managed to infiltrate the political apparatus of the State and had the support of political parties such as Fuerza Popular. According to Carlos Gálvez, former president of the National Society of Mining, Petroleum and Energy, many members of Congress owed their positions to this influence.

The expropriation through eminent domain of communal lands are often carried out in a blunt manner, forcing these communities to migrate elsewhere. Meanwhile, at least during Fujimori's government, programs aimed at disaster prevention in the Cordillera Blanca, a region vulnerable to natural hazards, were reduced. Proponents of neoliberal doctrine often discredit ecological alternatives to raw material extraction, which are championed by peasant and indigenous communities, accusing them of being ideologically driven. The economist of Awajún origin, Sanchium Yampiag, criticized the narrative that presents the Peruvian economy exclusively as a mining economy, when historically this has not been the case.

It is significant that the territorial rights established in the economic chapters of the 1993 Political Constitution were ambiguously worded. Between 1995 and 2011, the transfer of communally owned lands to private hands was legally permitted, which led to social conflicts such as the one in Bagua. By 2011, the government, in compliance with Convention 169 of the International Labour Organization, had established prior consultation law, which eliminates the free transfer of lands and requires the consent of indigenous peoples for their use.

In 2025, Congress acknowledged that communal properties had been invaded under the premise that "several peasant communities no longer exist or are no longer inhabited". That same year, the Observatory of Mining Conflicts noted that 1% of titleholders hold half of the mining concessions in Peru.

=== Land use and prior consultation ===
The government of Alberto Fujimori implemented reforms to encourage private investment without exercising oversight over natural or indigenous territories. First, the 1990 Environmental and Natural Resources Code was amended, which the business sector considered an “obstacle” due to its inconsistencies regarding the management of ecological wealth. Subsequently, the Law on Private Investment in the Development of Economic Activities on Lands of the National Territory and of Peasant and Native Communities (“land law”, 26505) was created. Furthermore, the National Environmental Fund was established to seek public and private investment commitments for the protection of natural resources. The newly elected congressman Jorge Rimarachín Cabrera warned that the "land law" (26505) and subsequent laws to promote private investment in unexploited lands were part of the "neoliberal offensive," which led to the depopulation of some peasant and native communities and the government's abandonment of agriculture.

Extractive industries in Peru persisted in the following decades, despite weak opposition, and were promoted by private companies after the abandonment of the Washington Consensus. Consequently, the revenue-generating strategy remained rooted in the old-regime economic model, and the country was unable to develop a replacement industry. As context, the manufacturing industry began to decline drastically in the 1990s and authors such as Germán Alarco and Toribio Sanchium suggest that economic diversification is deficient. In places like the Las Bambas copper mine, Chinese authoritarian state practices have been reportedly used to retain the right to extract mineral resources.

In response to reforms aimed at promoting land investment, the Special Multisectoral Commission for Native Communities was created in 2001 to oversee the implementation of these measures in these territories and communities. In 2008, Alan García approved the creation of the Ministry of Environment , which included an oversight office (Environmental Assessment and Enforcement Agency , OEFA) to monitor the extraction of raw materials, as required by the free trade agreement with the United States. However, the continued involvement of other ministries (Energy and Mines, Production, and Agriculture) in environmental matters was questioned. In 2011, prior consultation, as required by international conventions, was established.

In 2012, the National Environmental Certification Service for Sustainable Investments (Senace) was created, an organization tasked with issuing certifications to private companies that operate responsibly in the country. According to mining consultant Susanne Gratius, President Ollanta Humala sought to balance the social demands of communities, which often opposed mining (as in the case of Conga), with the need to promote production and the country's economic growth. The requirement for mining certification did not achieve the expected success and began to lose momentum due to corporate pressure. In 2014, President Humala announced a series of plans, known as the "economic package," to compensate companies in the extractive sector for the fines imposed, plans supported by the National Society of Industries. Later, emails from Minister René Cornejo were leaked revealing a dispute over the exploitation of natural resources and Ollanta Humala's decisions regarding it.

In 2022, Indigenous and labor organizations denounced the existence of environmental pollution from mining and oil extraction, and demanded a corporate social responsibility standard. In 2023, the Ministry of Energy and Mines established that companies must submit a series of agreements voluntarily reached between companies and Indigenous communities (different from the mandatory agreements with the Government, such as environmental impact studies). However, these agreements were not made public due to problems with the presentation of the ministry's platform, which prevents OEFA from monitoring compliance with these commitments.

In 2024, during Dina Boluarte's administration, the Council of State authorized police and military personnel to defend areas where economic activities are taking place, a measure that drew criticism from opponents of the extractive industry and neoliberalism, who accused them of being "a danger to our national security". The administration planned to intervene in the management of Senace, whose directorship had been vacant since 2023.

=== Development of the agricultural export industry ===
The mining sector is closely linked to the agricultural and aquaculture sectors, which were fundamental to the Inca Empire. Chilean diplomat Gabriel Gaspar has described Peru as a country "with an export-oriented agro-mining profile". At least in the Puno department, the mining, agricultural, and aquaculture sectors were at the same level of competitiveness. Ángel Manero Campos, the Minister of Agrarian Development and Irrigation under Dina Boluarte, defended the position that mining not only contributes through tax revenue but also has synergistic effects on agriculture, and emphasized that mining companies invest in agriculture and finance agro-industrial projects.

Fernando Eguren pointed out that the neoliberal reforms during Fujimori's presidency spurred the growth of a modern and dynamic agro-export sector, which represents less than 10% of the coastal agricultural land and only 1.5% of the country's total cultivated land. Despite its economic potential to rival the mining sector, Eguren clarified that export agriculture is unlikely to significantly improve the efficiency of the agricultural sector as a whole, even if it were to double in size.

The 1997 El Niño phenomenon made the consequences of not having disaster prevention programs evident. The agricultural sector faced serious economic difficulties, leading some farmers to accumulate bank debt in 2000. The president of the National Agrarian Confederation pointed out that the emergency decree (031-2000) did not offer all the necessary economic compensation.

In 2000, the Law for the Promotion of the Agricultural Sector (27360) was enacted, signed by the then Minister of Agriculture, José Chlimper, founder of an agro-export company and former ally of Alberto Fujimori. The law was characterized by tax reductions for companies in the sector. In 2025, local media reported the existence of a new law inspired by Chlimper. The Peruvian Center for Social Studies denounced that this law seeks to weaken labor oversight of agro-export companies, promote land trafficking between farmers and non-farmers, and allow user associations to conduct transactions with saved water.

=== Hydrocarbon industry ===
Then-President Alberto Fujimori entered into negotiations with the Shell-Mobil consortium, which had been conducting oil exploration since the 1980s and was composed of Shell (42.5%) and Mobil (57.5%). The consortium was responsible for the Camisea Gas Project, which produces a fuel cheaper than oil. In 1996, it was agreed that the consortium would have the rights for 40 years, but in 1998 it withdrew, and another company occupied and exploited the field in 2004. In 1998, the government granted the consortium the rights to use the Candamo Valley, where exploration had already taken place and where it was possible to extract water resources. In 1999, the miniseries Candamo: The Last Jungle Without Men premiered, which garnered media attention by highlighting oil extraction in the jungle with real indigenous people as protagonists. The following year, Mobil ceased its operations, and the Candamo Valley became protected when it was incorporated into Parque Nacional Bahuaje Sonene.

After the Fujimori regime, the Camisea gas pipeline, which distributes natural gas to the Peruvian coast, has had a major impact on the extractive industry. During its construction, some minor conflicts arose with Andean communities, such as the one in 2002 with the installation of the San Antonio, Toccate, and Chiquintirca camps. Roque Benavides admitted that a portion of the energy consumption of formal Peruvian mining depends on the gas pipeline. Alberto Ríos Villacorta, from Universidad ESAN, noted that, since its commissioning, "the political class in power uses Camisea natural gas as a tool to attract voters". In 2024, the Ministry of Energy and Mines, under the government of Dina Boluarte, proposed exploiting the Candamo deposits in 2028 in anticipation of the potential depletion of Camisea gas.

=== Tax exemption for the Peruvian Amazon ===
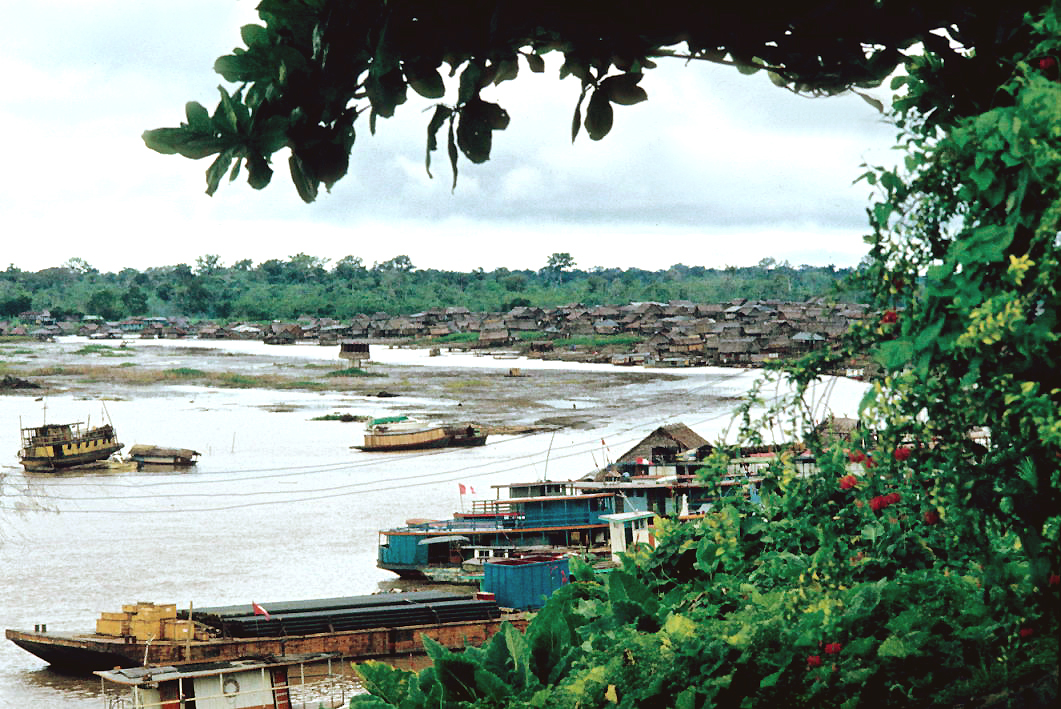
Iquitos, one of the cities in the Peruvian Amazon. The photograph from 1980 shows the Belén neighborhood, one of the city's economic zones.

The Fujimori government enacted the Law for the Promotion of Investment in the Amazon, which exempted some regions of the Peruvian jungle from taxes. This was a compensatory measure for the lack of development policies in these areas, since previously only President Fernando Belaunde Terry had dared to launch, unsuccessfully, a project to colonize the jungle and establish its capital, Ciudad Constitución. As a result, 350 districts supposedly benefited from not having to pay taxes.

The tax exemption, which was initially set to expire in a few years, was extended over time due to possible pressure from private lobbies and other powerful groups. Politician Roger Guerra-García criticized this measure as a belated application of the neoliberal creed, indicating that the Amazon has not been a priority for the government and that its actions have fueled the debate.

=== Exemption from technical studies of Amazonian forests ===
In 2020, the Ministry of Economy and Finance held a meeting with private companies to establish new forestry uses for commercial exploitation in areas assigned by the State. The details of the meeting were not made public. Some of the companies that participated in the meeting were responsible for requesting that Congress not ratify the Escazú Agreement which was signed in 2018, including Confiep.

In December 2023, Confiep and eleven other business associations supported the passage of the Anti-Forestry Law that eliminated the requirement for technical studies to classify Amazonian rainforests. This measure, which allows for agricultural activities in deforested areas, would lead to farmers being able to cultivate oil palm (whose companies are responsible for deforesting 13,000 hectares of forest with irregular titles, including Ocho Sur, by using land that was formerly virgin forest and food crops without restrictions. Furthermore, according to the proponents of this change, it was intended to benefit coffee growers, among others. The law was enacted the following month, without opposition from the government of Dina Boluarte. According to Infobae , which consulted sources close to the Executive branch, the government's lack of explicit statements on the law was due to a direct prohibition from the Presidency of the Council of Ministers.

This law was criticized by the Interethnic Association for the Development of the Peruvian Rainforest (AIDESEP) for violating the right to prior consultation and by the Environmental Investigation Agency for treating the Amazon as a territory to be further colonized. One of AIDESEP's representatives, Julio Cusurichi, stated that the law's approval "is designed for large industries that will validate the invasion of our territories". In addition, various civil society organizations expressed concern about the risk that this law would favor criminal organizations. On the other hand, some members of Congress submitted requests for reconsideration of the law, which were irregularly dismissed; while the Judiciary ordered Congress to comply with the right to prior consultation before voting on its laws. In 2024, the Congressional Commission on Andean Peoples approved a report to repeal the law due to concerns about its impact on indigenous communities.

== Impact ==
Neoliberalism had a profound impact on Peru, affecting politicians, businesspeople, and the general public alike. The state significantly diminished its presence in the social and economic lives of Peruvians, but gained political control and the ability to maintain public order. Consequently, the country had the opportunity to grow exponentially thanks to the Washington Consensus, although this came at a social cost. Analysts such as economist Bikut Toribio Sanchium Yampiag point out that this growth has not translated into a better quality of life, while researcher Francisco Durand asserted that Alberto Fujimori "liquidated the national bourgeoisie" in favor of a vision open to large foreign corporations.

The report "The Privatization Process in Peru during the Period 1991-2002 ," published by the Economic Commission for Latin America and the Caribbean, indicated that the privatization of companies accelerated the concentration and centralization of other companies, especially in the public services sector, and that consumers have not experienced a positive impact on their well-being due to the absence of effective regulatory mechanisms, resulting in systematically rising prices and tariffs. In 2021, Manuel Dammert Guardia, a sociologist and professor at the Pontifical Catholic University of Peru, noted that in Lima, "the per capita budget of San Isidro is four to six times greater than that of San Juan de Lurigancho". In some areas of the capital, commercial warehouses began to be built, some clandestinely, as the newspaper El Comercio was able to confirm in 2025.

The Central Reserve Bank of Peru (BCRP), an autonomous institution established de iure by the 1979 Constitution and de facto by the 1993 Constitution, has achieved its function of "maintaining monetary stability" in the three decades following the Fujimori regime. The BCRP had a president who publicly defended investment (Note: The president who remained in the Central Bank the longest was Julio Velarde, who remained for more than 20 years with the promise of not granting loans to the State to keep his position. En 2024, Velarde admitió que el capítulo económico de la Constitución de 1993 protegió las inversiones y la propiedad privada para garantizar su estabilidad económica. En 2026, Fredy Roque señaló que la alianza con José María Balcázar, político de Perú Libre elegido como presidente interino, y Julio Velarde había sido vista como un «gesto simbólico que debe traducirse rápidamente en señales políticas claras» ante acusaciones de modificar el destino económico del país. Fuerza Popular ha advertido que destituirá a Balcázar si interviene a la institución económica.) and allowed specialized economists to address the country's economic issues regardless of their political positions. Due to its remarkable autonomy and its capacity to make decisions, such as having achieved single-digit inflation since 1997 (compared to the period between 1921 and 1940), the author Manuel Monteagudo Valdez considered it a "fourth branch of government".

While the Central Reserve Bank of Peru (BCRP) maintained economic stability, the state was unable to address factors such as the informal economy and widespread corruption. Corruption grew at the same rate as during Fernando Belaúnde's second term in the late 1980s, and no president in 25 years managed to reduce it. Consequently, weak institutions hampered the development of business organizations due to the questionable social habits and conventions that had become established in the country. Despite this situation, neoliberalism remained in force, and a paradox even emerged, proposed by Hernán Alberro and also by the academic Alejandro Safarov, in which "the separation between the political crisis (between the governments of the 2010s and 2020s) and economic stability has been surprising," although this separation is not permanent.

Francisco Durand pointed out that the neoliberal current adopted a “Darwinian view” of things, referring to the phrase “survival of the fittest”, in which the largest companies are admired for being the “strongest players” in the market. In 2004, the publication Peru: The Top 10,000 Companies, edited by José Carlos Lumbreras, determined that, of the 100 companies with the highest revenues in Peru during 2002, 51 were foreign-owned, with a total capital of US$739.61 million. These formal companies had developed strategies to reduce administrative costs. By 2026, banks held more than six times the economic assets of the country's mining companies. Javier Flores described this case as a "structural asymmetry" in the country's macroeconomy and considered that it is not necessary for the country to directly control natural resources to have an impact, since it controls access to financing, mainly through the concentration of liquidity, credit, and means of payment.

The lack of vision and state control over businesses fostered adverse behaviors. Research, such as that published in the Journal of Economics, Finance and Administrative Science, suggests that many companies adopted a short-term approach, seeking to live off their profits and attempting to obtain economic favors from the government. Startups had to grow by distancing themselves from the tax system due to the high costs they would have to pay. These micro-enterprises moved into the informal sector and preferred to remain in this situation, without the legal possibility of collaborating with the State, even though large, established companies did. In 2024, 60% of Peruvian households depended on people working in the informal sector, thus exposing them to situations of vulnerability, such as food insecurity.

A 2009 report by the Ombudsman's Office indicated that almost half of the demonstrations that occurred in the early 2000s stemmed from discontent with foreign investment. Immigrants from other regions had to live alongside Lima's middle class, which enjoyed a better quality of life and whose area of influence expanded to surrounding areas of the urban center, also known as cones. To meet the needs of the middle class, the Financial Times highlighted in 2013 the construction of shopping malls, which increased during the government of Ollanta Humala.

With the arrival of the COVID-19 pandemic, the Peruvian state was already a capitalist entity dependent on the global economy with a bureaucratic presence. This was not enough to confront the pandemic, which highlighted the harsh reality of citizens abandoned by the state. Proponents of this ideological current attributed the crisis in basic services to the corruption scandals that implicated almost all of Peru's former presidents in the 1990s, 2000s, and 2010s. In 2024, during the CADE Executives meeting (held annually in the country), participating business leaders agreed in the "Arequipa Declaration" that "the only way to combat poverty and address social and economic gaps is through private investment".

=== Political control ===
We mistakenly call them "neoliberals", in reality they are "conservatives". They were called that (in the United States) because they were the liberals who went over to the conservative sector, and that is why they were called neoliberals, but that is only an episode of the Reagan administration. [...] If we were to transfer the political-electoral debates that take place in the United States to Peru (because of ideology), here its [opposition] leaders would appear as communists because they are talking all the time about social security, pensions, education, health, services. [...] [Advocates] accept that certain aspects of the Washington Consensus are sacrosanct.

— Enrique Zileri, in a 1999 interview for La República about the political situation in a possible new general election.

The economic elite maintained direct contact with central authorities to make decisions. Some authors have even suggested that these groups held most of the political control in the country, a point that has been the subject of debate. Institutions remained weak under the governments of Alejandro Toledo and Alan García, while it was suggested that Peruvians began to distrust public institutions and viewed democracy with skepticism. In addition to Peruvians in general, Kent Eaton suggested that proponents of regional decentralization showed a rejection of the neoliberal current.

With the arrival of the economic elite, the period of "democratic neoliberalism" (also referred to as the "business republic") began. During this period, Lima's economic groups restructured, and new groups emerged in the interior of the country, benefiting from market liberalization and expansion in the 1990s. The Lima groups stood out for their greater internationalization, participation in the stock exchange, and attraction of transnational capital, which gave them more influence in the State, the media, and business organizations such as Confiep. With Valentín Paniagua's assumption of power as Alberto Fujimori's successor, the business confederation welcomed the appointment of Ministers of Economy and Industry committed to the private sector.

In 2023, the Organisation for Economic Co-operation and Development (OECD) described Peru as having "a thriving private sector," but noted a drawback: "Many markets in Peru are dominated by a few large business groups, resulting in high concentration and a low perception of competition. Pedro Castillo drafted a bill to prevent monopolies in the country, particularly in the media, but it failed.

Economic groups opposed substantial modifications to the social structure, perhaps because they held more conservative positions than those of the Washington Consensus. This allowed a new consensus to emerge in Lima, a city benefiting from globalization, which became known as the Lima Consensus. With the Lima Consensus, elites gained veto power in government, </ref> reventing the consolidation of a true liberal democracy in the post-Fujimori governments.

While some independent agencies are financially self-sufficient, institutions that regulate the market, such as Osiptel and Ositran, lack sufficient resources. According to the OECD (2024), these agencies still depend on the Council of Ministers. In fact, within these agencies, some businesspeople took advantage of the "revolving door," a practice whereby they could move between positions in the private sector and the regulatory body that oversees it. This practice has persisted over time.

The journalist César Hildebrandt argued that a candidate's political power is irrelevant, since Confiep always wins, even when the candidates come from political ideologies other than the right, such as Alejandro Toledo and Ollanta Humala. For his part, Carlos Bedoya, executive director of the Latin American Network for Economic and Social Justice, maintained that political corruption was deeply rooted in Confiep.

=== Inequality ===
Poverty and marginalization were the factors that fueled the neoliberal movement. Outside of Lima, and despite private support within the country, numerous Peruvian citizens, lacking the backing of the influential elite, were forced to accept deficiencies in essential services such as education, justice, and security. Farid Matuk, former head of the INEI, pointed out that the growth of inequality is not related to the reduction of the State's presence in the production of goods or services, but rather to the lack of tax pressure on the political and economic elite.

The fear of losing one's job and the precariousness of labor (which worsened with the adjustment policies implemented in Peru during the last decade of the 20th century) were the reasons why trade unionism was unable to renew itself and maintain its relevance. Added to the high rate of informal employment, by 2010 working conditions in the country had reached a mostly deplorable level, similar to that of the early 1960s.

The reduction of labor rights resulted in a lack of income and wealth distribution, a significant issue when compared to other Latin American countries. In the 2020 Latinobarometer, the majority of respondents perceived a focus on “individual survival” and felt that wealth distribution was unfair. A 2020 study on the employment of health professionals concluded that people of other races are less likely to receive a living wage and need additional employment to survive.

Historian Carmen Mc Evoy believes that one of the aristocratic personifications of neoliberalism in the following years is the "Citizen Chibolín", who is a model of "the absolute degradation of civic values, as well as the rapid social ascent (from 'nothing') where a precarious education was compensated with an insatiable thirst for recognition through ill-gotten gains." For Mc Evoy, this type of model considers honest work as something limited "for fools".

Rolando Rojas, from the Institute of Peruvian Studies, argued that the precariousness of institutions and largely informal economic growth, combined with the massive emergence of small businesses, have changed the Peruvian economic and social landscape through an ideology akin to neoliberalism: entrepreneurship. For the citizen transformed into an entrepreneur, society is not conceived as a collection of subjects with rights, but rather as a group of individuals competing to escape poverty and achieve economic success, which implies relativizing inequality. The researcher, citing Cuenca, Reátegui, and Rentería (in the 2022 book "The Entrepreneurial Subject: Imaginaries of Success and Representations of Work"), pointed out that the ideology of entrepreneurship has a “negative impact on the development of citizenship or the strengthening of institutions".

=== Commodification of academic preparation ===
Fujimori's neoliberal model allowed teaching in the private sector, something that was prohibited by the 1979 Constitution. An important feature of this model is the "promotion of investment in education", which was carried out through legislation published in 1996 and which supposedly sought an alternative to state-funded education. By 2010, investment in private-sector educational services had almost reached US$14.5 billion, 3% of national GDP.

The neoliberal model brought with it a phenomenon of the commodification of education, in which knowledge is privatized and profit is established as a legal objective. While quality educational centers existed at a high price, outside of them the "combi culture" emerged. In this context, students finished their studies in low-budget and even informal centers and in deficient facilities (the "fake schools"). By 2025, a third of the country's private primary schools were classified as "low-cost" boarding schools. By 2026, those premises where education was provided without supervision, referred to by Infobae as "garage schools", were legalized.

The implementation of business logic in education within a neoliberal context has led to the weakening of sociological and political science-related subjects within university training. A study on the Neoliberal Educational Reform (that undertaken from 1990 with its final revision in 1997) by the Universidad San Ignacio de Loyola reached the following conclusion: “[The reform] did not rely on the widespread sense of defeat within the progressive camp to discredit democratic-liberal educational strategies, declare the traditional educational system obsolete, and erase from memory the countless educational experiences (that developed in the mid- and late 20th century.

Due to the problems of unregulated education during Alberto Fujimori's government, both the political left and right sought to address this issue with reforms, but these efforts were unsuccessful. At the end of this administration, an attempt was made to allocate approximately 6% of GDP to education through the National Agreement, but this figure was not reached. Consequently, the National Fund for the Development of Peruvian Education was created to finance all state educational institutions, a goal it continues to this day. Educator Juan Rivera Palomino pointed out that educational quality had declined due to the poor results on standardized tests during the governments of Alejandro Toledo and Ollanta Humala.

The Unified Union of Education Workers of Peru (SUTEP) has been, since 1991, one of the critics of the new form of education based on the measures dictated by Alberto Fujimori, since, in its opinion, these sought to "undermine the self-esteem of the teaching profession". In 2008, its secretary pointed out that an educational text highlighted the neoliberal period "as if it were the panacea for the country, but it does not mention at all the profound differences it creates between the poorest and the business class".

Regarding the Peru-United States Free Trade Agreement in the late 2000s, the newspaper La República noted that the State had not planned to address teaching services in its bilateral agreement and that the issue of deregulation in education between the two countries (except in language and culinary arts centers) was still up in the air, without ruling out the possibility of making changes to national legislation in the future.

=== Deregulation of public transport ===
With these modifications, any entrepreneur could operate transport lines in urban areas without it being strictly necessary for them to be formally registered. Focused on serving the low-income population, the increase in services by shell companies allowed drivers to compete with each other, risking their own lives. This new stage became known as the "penny war", and lasted for decades afterward.

In the case of the Lima metropolitan area, the municipality implemented route concessions through ordinances issued from the late 1990s onward, granting them the right to operate the routes. The concession system underwent several changes, including the introduction of half-fare fares in 2004 and the unification of Lima's routes in 2010. The latter was carried out as part of an integrated transportation system project aimed at formalizing the routes. Subsequently, Mayor Susana Villarán offered urban and peripheral route concessions for at least a decade to companies with a minimum net worth.

According to Luis Quispe Candia, in practice, no measures were taken to eliminate the concept of "shell" corporations in order to unify formality. As a result, according to a 2023 investigation by El Comercio more than 385 bus companies operated in Lima. Adding to this situation, the newspaper reported that some collectives attempted to form their own political party in 2023. Attempts to replace bus companies with complementary corridors in Lima failed to materialize.

=== New patterns of consumption and leisure ===
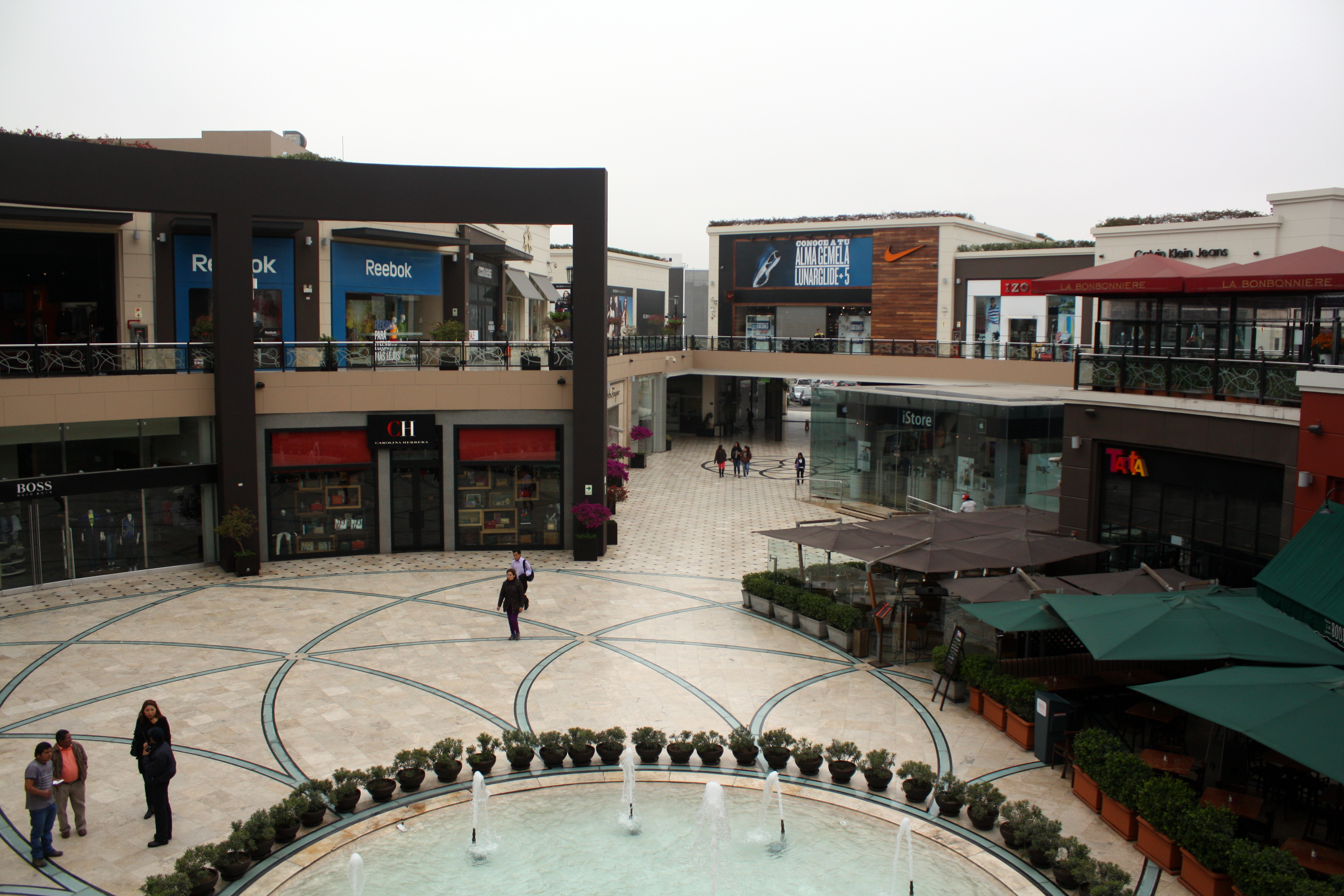
Jockey Plaza Shopping Centerinaugurated in 1997, is one of the largest shopping centers in the country. Furthermore, it is the most frequented location by Peruvian businesspeople, according to the Lima Chamber of Commerce in 2023.

With the arrival of the neoliberal state, Peruvians adapted to the lifestyle of international trade. Department stores with international brands, mainly American, appeared, and Lima residents were the first to consume them: initially the wealthy population and, later, other social strata when franchises opened in the outskirts of the capital. There is controversy regarding the treatment of consumers by franchises. Compared to advertisements made in other countries, such as the United States, Brazil, England, and South Africa, advertisements aimed at the Peruvian population do not include features native to the country. According to specialist Wilfredo Ardito Vega, advertisers have sought since the 2000s to segment their messages to the white population with models of that complexion, which is the target audience. Ardito Vega argued that franchises such as Saga Falabella and Ripley resorted to these practices to promote their products in catalogs and television segments.

Equivocadamente los llamamos "neoliberales", en realidad son "conservadores". Se les llamó así (en Estados Unidos) porque fueron los liberales que se pasaron al sector conservador, y por eso se les llamó neoliberales, pero eso es sólo un episodio del gobierno de Reagan. [...] Si trasladáramos los debates político-electorales que se dan en Estados Unidos al Perú (a causa de la ideología), aquí sus dirigentes [opositores] aparecerían como comunistas porque todo el tiempo están hablando de seguridad social, de pensiones, de educación, de salud, de servicios. [...] [Los defensores] aceptan que ciertos aspectos del Consenso de Washington son sacrosantos.

— Enrique Zileri, en una entrevista de 1999 para La República sobre la situación política en unas eventuales nuevas elecciones generales.

A significant feature of urban growth in Lima is the lack of public spaces, some of which remained in excellent condition (for example, the wealthier districts had green lawns) while others were leased out by the municipalities starting in the 1990s. This has allowed for the construction of commercial zones that have filled the need for recreational spaces. Between 2006 and 2011, 20 new shopping malls were built in Peru, offering goods and services with bank financing. In 2014, AméricaEconomía reported that more malls were planned to be built outside the country.

In 2025, a YouTuber filming Plaza San Miguel was confronted by municipal security officers because one of the streets had been privatized, but they were sanctioned after it was determined that filming in that location was not prohibited. The involvement of public officials representing the private sector sparked debate on social media. The shopping center acknowledged that "the public thoroughfare, and, as its name indicates, a public space for the community, not only of the district, but of everyone".

Far from urban areas, beaches have had their access restricted, becoming exclusive spaces for a certain segment of the population, despite the fact that the 1993 Constitution considers them public places. According to the 2002 report by the National Superintendency of State Assets (SBN), 18 beaches have restricted access.Some of these are located in districts occupied by gated communities that have become the preferred summer destination for the upper and upper-middle classes of Lima society. The construction of shopping centers has been planned in the Sur Chico area, where several well-known beaches are located.

== Public opinion ==
A 1998 survey by Apoyo revealed that 68% of respondents disapproved of neoliberal policies. In 2010, 86% of those surveyed by Ipsos Apoyo agreed that the economic model should be modified partially or totally. In 2016, this figure was 72%, according to GFK.

In 2021, when Pedro Castillo came to power, only 26% of those surveyed by Apoyo expressed a favorable view of the economic model. Two years later, in a context of recession, 19% of those surveyed by Ipsos (a figure that increased to 26% in the rural sector) believed that, if the economic model had failed, it was the responsibility of businesspeople, substantially lower than the 75% (63% in the rural sector) attributed to politicians.

An Ipsos poll for Perú 21, shared in 2023 by Federico Salazar, indicated that 31% of respondents overall favored businesspeople assuming high-level government positions. Within the business community, 64% stated their support for such measures.

Another 2023 Ipsos survey for Perú 21 indicated that out of every ten people surveyed across all economic sectors, four preferred to start their own businesses, three to be freelancers, two to work in the private sector, and only one in the public sector. Regarding the private sector, respondents placed greater emphasis on "job creation" and "generating business opportunities. That year, Ipsos noted that Peru was the fourth country in the world in terms of entrepreneurship, with 54% of participants, higher than the global average of 31%. Other details offered by this study show that 75% of businesses were started independently, and only 46% considered government support a key element. Also that year, a Credicorp market study presented by Ánimo Inversionista revealed that the majority of the nearly 1,600 Peruvians surveyed considered starting a business the most attractive option. This alternative was of particular interest to young adults.

In 2025, the study "1000 Peruvians Say" indicated that some Peruvians had stopped prioritizing entrepreneurship (representing 38%) in order to improve their lifestyle (representing 43%). That same year, another study by the Public Opinion Research Center of the University of Piura indicated that only 3% of students from 93 licensed universities believed that the economic model should remain unchanged.

Personalities such as Christopher Gianotti, host of a magazine program on TV Perú, believes that people can become successful solely by “working hard", (Note: It is worth highlighting the contribution of Wilfredo Ardito Vega (2006) about the supposed success through the economic development of rural people. Ardito Vega emphasized the deep-rooted myth that people in poverty are "idle and conformists." This stereotype hides the state's ineffectiveness in meeting their needs, aggravated by geographical and cultural barriers. Patricia Zárate señala que, según la Encuesta Nacional de Percepción de Desigualdades (2023), parte de la población apoya el emprendimiento como herramienta para reducir la pobreza. No obstante, existen discrepancias sobre el papel del Estado en el fomento de esta actividad.) minimizing the economic inequality that exists in the country. Similarly, lawyer Madeleine Osterling encouraged business leaders to reject dissenting voices, such as the newspaper La República and regional radio stations. These helped to give voice to a dissenting perspective during the 2021 political crisis, amidst the dominance of conservative politicians who were trying to shape public opinion. (Note: For more context on the conspiracy theory of conservative politicians, see Caviar mafia.)

== See also ==
- Conservatism in Peru
- Burguesía chola
- Marca Perú
- Movimiento Kloaka
- Lima Consensus

== Notes ==
=== Notes ===
External image
- Gráfico Chart based on the survey conducted in 2016 by GFK via Gestión.

== Bibliography ==
- Alarco Tosoni, Germán (2019). A Post-Neoliberal Agenda: Economic Proposals . Lima: Otra Mirada. ISBN 978-612-48005-0-4 . Retrieved October 26, 2023.
- Castillo García, César (December 29, 2025). “A new chronology of Peruvian neoliberalism: an alternative methodological approach” . Discursos Del Sur (16): 1-32. ISSN 2617-2291 . doi : 10.15381/dds.n16.32500 . Retrieved March 6, 2026 .
- Ciccarelli, Orazio A. (November 1, 1993). "The other entrepreneurs: ethics of migrants and the formation of companies in Lima". Hispanic American Historical Review (in English) 73 (4): 714-715. ISSN 0018-2168 . doi : 10.1215/00182168-73.4.714 . Retrieved September 13, 2024 .
- Díaz Albertini, Javier (2001). «The political participation of the middle classes and NGOs in Peru in the nineties» . América Latina Hoy 28 : 115-147. ISSN 2340-4396 . doi : 10.14201/alh.2772 . Retrieved June 13, 2024 .
- Drinot, Paulo (2014). «Foucault in the Land of the Incas: Sovereignty and Governmentality in Neoliberal Peru» . In Drinot, Paulo, ed. Peru in Theory . Studies of the Americas (in English) . Palgrave Macmillan US. pp. 167-189. ISBN 978-1-137-45526-0 . doi : 10.1057/9781137455260_8 . Retrieved October 24, 2023.
- Durand, Francisco (December 1, 2004). “Neoliberalism, entrepreneurs and the state”. Debates in Sociology (29): 40-84. ISSN 2304-4284 . doi : 10.18800/debatesensociologia.200401.003 . Retrieved October 27, 2023 .
- Eaton, Kent (April 3, 2015). «Disciplining Regions: Subnational Contention in Neoliberal Peru» . Territory, Politics, Governance (in English) 3 (2): 124-146. ISSN 2162-2671 . doi : 10.1080/21622671.2015.1005126 . Retrieved October 26, 2023.
- Ewig, Christina (2012). Second-wave neoliberalism: gender, race and health sector reform in Peru . Health and Society (First edition). Institute of Peruvian Studies. ISBN 978-9972-51-330-5 . Retrieved October 27, 2023 .
- Ford Cole, Felipe (2018). «Neoliberalism's Law in Peru: A Model» . In MacNaughton, Gillian; Frey, Diane F., eds. Economic and social rights in a neoliberal world (in English) . Cambridge University Press. pp. 41-58. ISBN 978-1-108-41815-7 . LCCN 2018009859 . OCLC 1046065691 . Retrieved November 17, 2023 .
- Gonzales De Olarte, Efraín (February 2006). “The Peruvian political economy of the neoliberal era 1990-2006” . In Murakami, Yusuke, ed. After the Washington Consensus: Dynamics of political-economic change and natural resource management in the Andean countries (Center for Integrated Area Studies, published March 1, 2007) 2 : 11-37 . Retrieved October 28, 2023 .
- Haya de la Torr , Agustín (2013). Essays on Political Sociology (Second Edition). Alas Peruanas University. ISBN 978-612-4097-63-8 . Legal Deposit 2013-03919 . Retrieved November 23, 2023 .
- Jiménez, Félix (September 1, 2022). Twenty-five years of neocolonial modernization: A critique of neoliberal policies in Peru . Institute of Peruvian Studies. ISBN 978-612-326-130-6 . OCLC 1374011888. Retrieved October 29, 2023 .
- Klaiber, Jeffrey (2007). «Catholic Schools in Peru: Elites, the Poor, and the Challenge Of Neoliberalism» . In Grace, Gerald, ed. International Handbook of Catholic Education: Challenges for School Systems in the 21st Century . International Handbooks of Religion and Education (in English) . Springer Netherlands. pp. 181-193. ISBN 978-1-4020-5776-2 . doi : 10.1007/978-1-4020-5776-2_10 . Retrieved October 23, 2023 .
- Lust, Jan (2019). «Neoliberalism and the Socialist Left in Peru: An Epochal Change» . In Lust, Jan, ed. Capitalism, Class and Revolution in Peru, 1980-2016 . Social Movements and Transformation (in English) . Springer International Publishing. pp. 11-24. ISBN 978-3-319-91403-9 . doi : 10.1007/978-3-319-91403-9_2 . Retrieved October 28, 2023 .
- Luque, José Carlos; Hernández Vinalay, Kenya (2022). “Neoliberalism and social citizenship in Peru: Fujimorism and its antecedents .” In Rios Burga, Jaime R.; Rojas Ramos, Moisés K., eds. Pandemic, possible consciousness and crisis of neoliberalism in Latin America (Digital Edition). Latin American Council of Social Sciences. CLACSO. pp. 282-298. ISBN 978-612-5025-31-9 . Accessed November 1, 2023 .
- Mejía Navarrete, Julio (2019). “Society, individualism and modernity in Peru” . Sociologias 21 : 260-285. ISSN 1517-4522 . doi : 10.1590/15174522-02105014 . Retrieved July 29, 2024 .
- Mendoza, Marina (July 15, 2023). «Peru, between the organic crisis and the captured political elites. A sociohistorical essay . Disjunctive. Critique of Social Sciences 4 (2): 9-22. ISSN 2659-7071 . doi : 10.14198/DISJUNTIVA2023.4.2.1 . Retrieved October 30, 2023 .
- Morón Pastor, Eduardo Andrés; Sanborn, Cynthia Ann (2007). The challenges of policymaking in Peru: actors, institutions and rules of the game . Working paper of the Research Center (First edition). Universidad del Pacífico. ISBN 978-9972-57-108-4 . OCLC 1026025621. Retrieved November 25, 2023 .
- Pascó-Font Quevedo, Alberto; Saavedra Chanduví, Jaime (2001). Structural reforms and well-being: a look at Peru in the nineties . Grupo de Análisis para el Desarrollo. ISBN 978-9972-615-19-1 . Retrieved January 1, 2025 .
- Reyes Lostaunau, Luis (December 1999). "Neoliberalism, poverty and social policies in Peru in the nineties". Journal of the Faculty of Economic Sciences of the National University of San Marcos IV (14): 61-74. ISSN 1561-0845 . Retrieved April 16, 2024 .
- Solfrini, Giuseppe (July 2001). «The Peruvian Labor Movement Under Authoritarian Neoliberalism : From Decline to Demise» . International Journal of Political Economy (in English) 31 (2): 44-77. ISSN 0891-1916 . doi : 10.1080/08911916.2001.11042861 . Retrieved October 27, 2023 .
- Torres Arancivia, Eduardo (2007). Searching for a King: Authoritarianism in the History of Peru, 16th-21st Centuries . Fondo Editorial de la Pontificia Universidad Católica del Perú. ISBN 978-9972-42-817-3 . doi : 10.18800/9789972428173 . Retrieved September 8, 2023 .
- Vigo Castilla, Martha Kruskaya (February 2, 2021). “Global health crisis: an opportunity to think about the citizen within the Peruvian neoliberal system. ” Social Research (44): 311–322. ISSN 1818-4758 . doi : 10.15381/is.v0i44.19574 . Retrieved October 29, 2023 .
- Vaz da Motta Brandão, Rafael (December 14, 2017). «Neoliberal reforms in Peru: state crisis, privatization and political authoritarianism (1990/2000)» . Latin American History Magazine (in Portuguese) 6 (18): 72-89. ISSN 2238-0620 . doi : 10.4013/rlah.v6i18.825 . Retrieved October 31, 2023 .
