= Peru national football team kit =

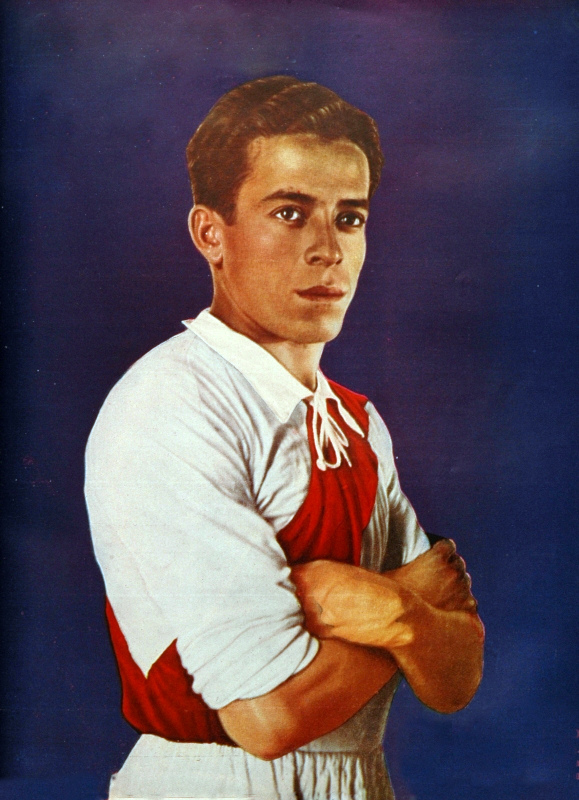
Segundo Castillo Varela, Peru's centre-midfielder from 1936 to 1939, wearing the fourth and current iteration of his national team's kit in 1937. (Note: Image modified from the cover art of the renown Argentine sports magazine El Gráfico, N° 919 (February 1937).)

The Peru national football team kit is the official sportswear used by the association football team organised by the Peruvian Football Federation (FPF) to represent Peru in international football friendlies and competitions.

Due to its long history and wide popular appeal, Peru's football kit has become an unofficial national symbol. The Peru national football team plays in red and white, the country's national colours.

Since 1936, Peru's first-choice kit has been white shirts, white shorts and white socks with a distinctive red "sash" crossing the shirt diagonally from the proper left shoulder to the right hip. This basic scheme has been only slightly altered over the years.

== History ==
Historical records from the Peruvian Football Federation (FPF) indicate that, in the early 20th century, when Peruvians and Englishmen played football matches in Callao (Peru's chief seaport), the locals wore red shirts to distinguish themselves from the foreigners. During leisure, British civilian workers and sailors played the sport among themselves and with locals in Callao and other commercial zones throughout South America. (Note: During these games in Callao, the Peruvians possibly invented the bicycle kick, which is known in Peru as the chalaca (meaning "from Callao").) In 1924, the FPF also equipped with red sweaters and white shorts the team representing it in a match against the team representing the Uruguayan Football Association—although neither side claimed the teams as their official national squads, sports historian Jaime Pulgar-Vidal Otálora argues that the local spectators understood the Peruvian side, composed of players from Callao and Lima (Peru's capital), to represent their national football team. (Note: Pulgar-Vidal Otálora additionally indicates that players from Lima and Callao also composed the FPF's first official Peru national football team in 1927.) The FPF intended to present this squad as Peru's official national team at the 1924 South American Championship, which was held in Montevideo to celebrate the Uruguayan national football team's victory at the 1924 Summer Olympics, but internal disputes and economic troubles impeded the Peruvians from traveling to Uruguay for the tournament.

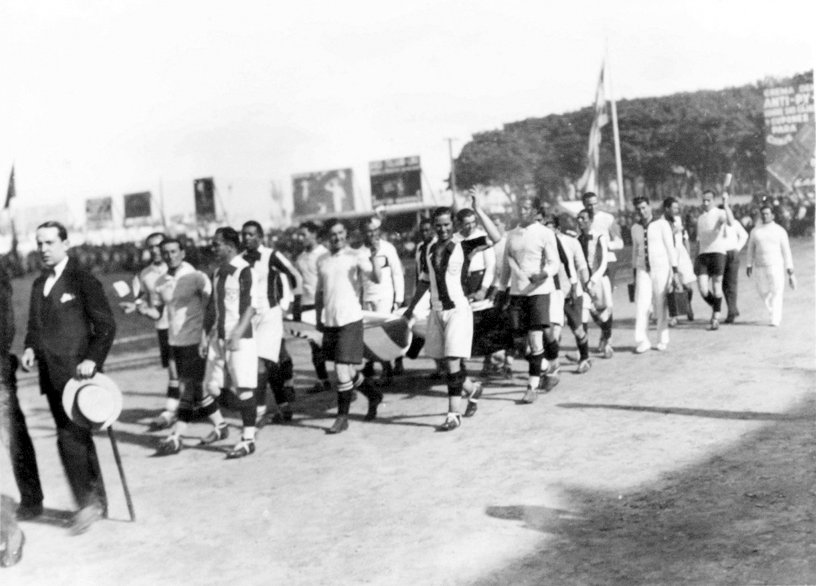
Peru wore its first official national football team kit in the 1927 South American Championship

The Peru national football team wore its first official kit at its formal debut in the 1927 South American Championship held in Lima. Peru's kit comprised a white-and-red striped jersey (a thick vertical stripe running down the middle front and back, with two equally-thick vertical stripe on the sides), white shorts, and black socks. Financial difficulties almost impeded Peru from organizing the tournament, but the Peruvian government of Augusto B. Leguía intervened to guarantee the tournament's financial sustainability. Leguía's government promoted the development of football as the country's national pastime, and Peruvian society at the time considered that the president sponsored the local football club Alianza Lima. Peruvian sports historians debate Leguía's personal involvement with football, and with Alianza Lima in particular, but Pulgar-Vidal Otálora points out that it might not be mere coincidence that Peru's first official national football kit nearly identically resembled that of Alianza—its blue-colored stripes and shorts marked the only difference with the national kit. Peru used this kit for six official matches, three at Lima's tournament and three at the 1929 South American Championship held in Buenos Aires.

Peru were compelled to use an alternative design in the 1930 World Cup because Paraguay had already registered a kit with white-and-red striped shirts. The Peruvians instead wore white shirts with a red collar, white shorts and black socks.

For the 1935 South American Championship, a horizontal red stripe was added to the shirt.

The following year, at the Berlin Olympics, the team adopted the red sash design it has retained ever since. According to Pulgar-Vidal Otálora, the idea for the diagonal red stripe came from school matches. More specific alterations

Peru National Football Team Kit Evolution
1924	1927-1929	1930	1935	Since 1936

== Sponsorship ==
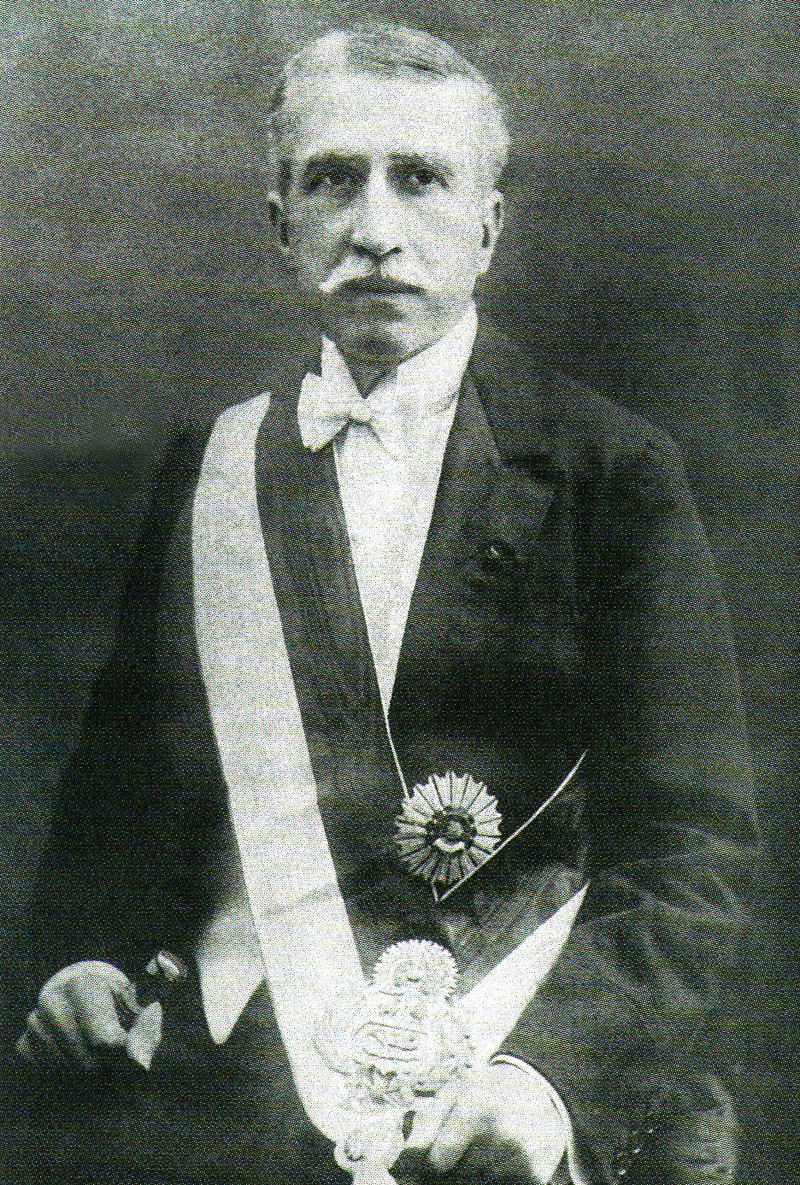
Peruvian President Augusto B. Leguía was possibly the first sponsor of Peru's national football team

The Peru national football team has had eight official kit suppliers The first of these, Adidas, began supplying the team's kit in 1978. Peru have since had contracts with Penalty (1981–82), Adidas (1983–85), Calvo Sportwear (1987), Power (1989–91), Diadora (1991–92), local manufacturer Polmer (1993–95), Umbro (1996–97), and Peruvian company Walon Sport (1998–2010). Umbro have produced the team's kit since 2010. Marathon supplied kits since 1 August 2018.

=== Suppliers ===
Kit supplier	Period	Notes
(Germany) Adidas	1978–1981	
(Brazil) Penalty	1981–1982	
(Germany) Adidas	1983–1985	
(Peru) Calvo	1986–1987	
(Germany) Puma	1987–1989	
(Switzerland) Power	1989–1991	
(Italy) Diadora	1991–1993	
(Peru) Polmer	1993–1995	
(United Kingdom) Umbro	1996–1997	
(Peru) Walon	1998–2010	
(United Kingdom) Umbro	2010–2018	
(Ecuador) Marathon	2018–2022	
(Germany) Adidas	2023–present	

== Design ==
The Peruvian football federation crest

Peru wears as its badge the emblem of the Peruvian Football Federation. The first badge, presented in 1927, had a heater shield design with the country's name and the federation's acronym (FPF). Eight different emblems followed, with the longest-lasting design being the modern French escutcheon form emblazoned in the team's jersey from 1953 until 2014. This design had the Peruvian flag at its base, and either the country's name or the federation's acronym at its top. Since 2014, the badge has a retro-inspired heater shield design, with the entire field comprised by Peru's flag and the federation's acronym, surrounded by a gold-colored frame.

=== First kits ===
1978 (1978 World Cup)	1982 (1982 World Cup)

2007–2009 (2010 World Cup Qualifiers)	2010 (Friendly matches)	2011 (Copa América, 2014 World Cup Qualifiers)	2012 (2014 World Cup Qualifiers)	2012–2013 (2014 World Cup Qualifiers)	2014–2015 (2015 Copa América)

2015–2017
(2018 World Cup Qualifiers)
2021

(2021 Copa America)

2016
(Copa América Centenario)

2018
(2018 World Cup)

2018–2019

2019
(2019 Copa América)

(2022 World Cup Qualifiers)

==== 2020-2022 ====
(2022 World Cup

Qualifiers)

=== Second kits ===
1978 (1978 World Cup)	1982 (1982 World Cup)	2007–2009	2010	2011	2012–2013

2014–2015	2015–2017 (Copa América Centenario, 2018 WC Qualifiers)	2018 (2018 World Cup)	2018–2019	2019 (2019 Copa América)

== Popularity ==
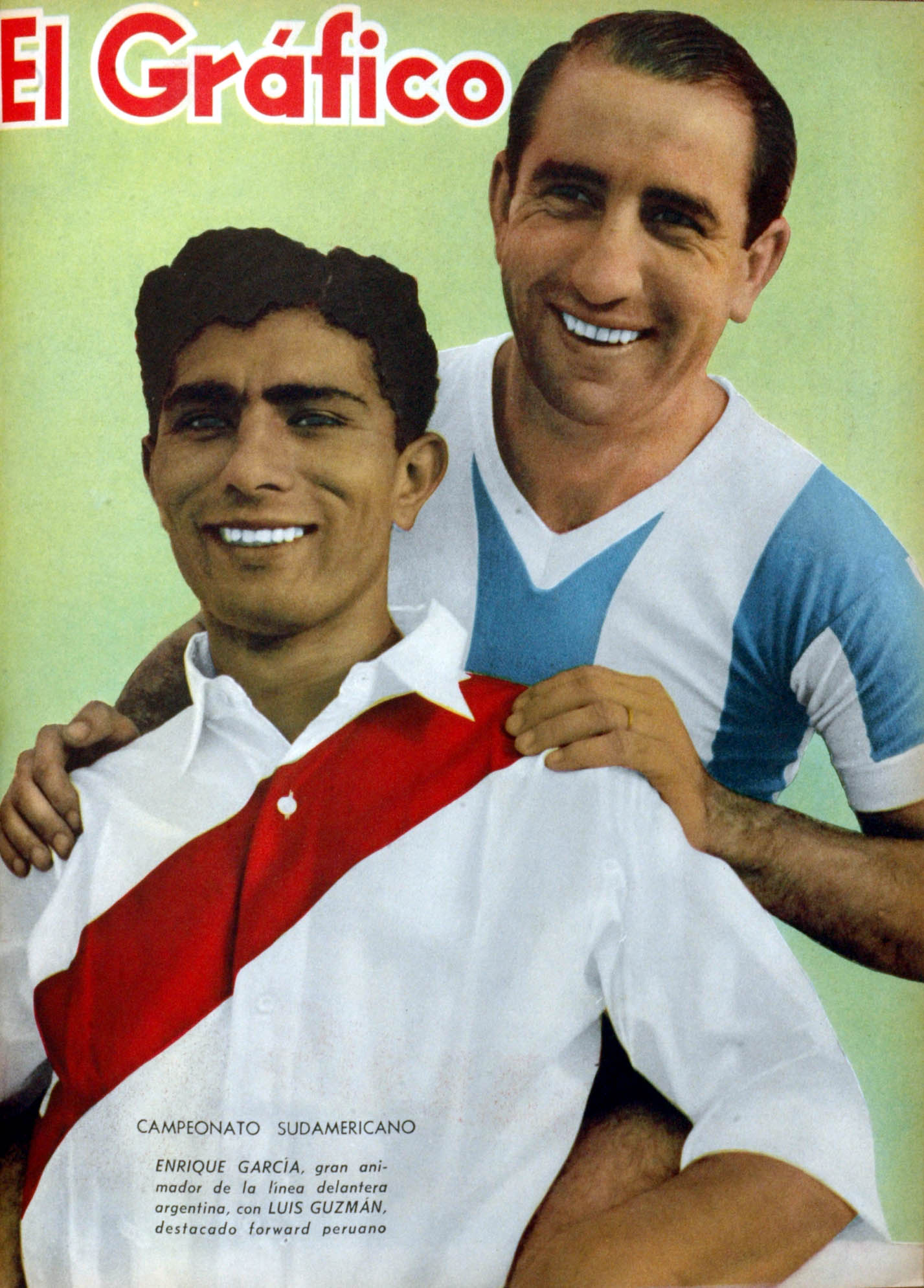
Argentine and Peruvian footballers in 1942.

Peru's kit has won praise as one of world football's most attractive designs. Christopher Turpin, the executive producer of NPR's All Things Considered news show, lauded the 1970 iteration as "the beautiful game's most beautiful shirt", also describing it as "retro even in 1970". Miles Kohrman, football reporter for The New Republic, commended Peru's kit as "one of soccer's best-kept secrets". Rory Smith, Chief Soccer Correspondent for The New York Times, referred to Peru's 2018 version of the jersey as "a classic" with a nostalgic, fan-pleasing "blood-red sash". The version worn in 1978 came first in a 2010 ESPN list of the "Best World Cup jerseys of all time", described therein as "simple yet strikingly effective".

The Peruvian kit allegedly impressed Malcolm Allison so much that he later introduced kits sporting sashes at Manchester City and Crystal Palace.

During the 2021 Peruvian presidential election, the Popular Force political party candidate Keiko Fujimori wore Peru's national football team jersey during rallies and debates. Some Peru national football team players also took to Twitter to promote the anti-communist message "Wear the Jersey Peru" (Spanish: "Ponte la camiseta Perú"), which implied support for Fujimori. Political analysts consider that the strategic use of the national team's jersey reduced the lead held by Pedro Castillo, the Free Peru political candidate. Castillo condemned what he called the "tarnishing" of the national team's jersey. Sociologist Sandro Venturo also expressed concern at the politicization of the national team's jersey, which he argues "in principle represents all Peruvians" regardless of their political leaning.

== See also ==
- Chile and Peru football rivalry
- Estadio Nacional (Lima)
- Football in Peru
- History of the Peru national football team
- Peru national football team indiscipline scandals
- Peru national football team records
- Peru national football team results
- Peruvian Primera División
- Sport in Peru

== Bibliography ==
- Agostino, Gilberto (2002). Vencer Ou Morrer: Futebol, Geopolítica e Identidade Nacional (in Portuguese). Rio de Janeiro: FAPERJ & MAUAD Editora Ltda. ISBN 85-7478-068-5.
- Basadre, Jorge (1964). Historia de la República del Perú (in Spanish). Vol. 10. Lima: Talleres Graficos P.L. Villanueva S.A.
- Bravo, Gonzalo (2012). "Association Football, Pacific Coast of South America". In Nauright, John; Parrish, Charles (eds.). Sports Around the World: History, Culture, and Practice. Vol. 3. Santa Barbara: ABC-Clio. ISBN 978-1-59884-301-9.
- DK Publishing (2011). "Essential Soccer Skills: Key Tips and Techniques to Improve Your Game". Essential Soccer Skills. New York: DK Publishing. ISBN 978-0-7566-5902-8.
- DK Publishing (2010). Soccer: The Ultimate Guide. New York: DK Publishing. ISBN 978-0-7566-7321-5.
- Dunmore, Tom (2011). Historical Dictionary of Soccer. Plymouth: Scarecrow Press, Inc. ISBN 978-0-8108-7188-5.
- Fiore, Fernando (2012). ¡Vamos al Mundial! (in Spanish). New York: HarperCollins. ISBN 978-0-06-222664-8.
- Foley Gambetta, Enrique (1983). Léxico del Peru (in Spanish). Vol. 3. Lima: Talleres Jahnos.
- Glanville, Brian (2010). The Story of the World Cup: The Essential Companion to South Africa 2010. London: Faber & Faber Limited. ISBN 978-0-571-23605-3.
- Goldblatt, David (2008). The Ball is Round. New York: Riverhead Trade. ISBN 978-1-59448-296-0.
- Handelsman, Michael (2000). Culture and Customs of Ecuador. Westport: Greenwood Press. ISBN 0-313-30244-8.
- Henshaw, Richard (1979). The Encyclopedia of World Soccer. Washington, D.C.: New Republic Books. ISBN 0-915220-34-2.
- Higgins, James (2005). Lima: A Cultural and Literary History. Oxford: Signal Books Limited. ISBN 1-902669-98-3.
- Jacobsen, Nils (2008). "Peru". In Herb, Guntram; Kaplan, David (eds.). Nations and Nationalism: A Global Historical Overview. Vol. 1. Santa Barbara: ABC-Clio. ISBN 978-1-85109-907-8.
- Leigh Raffo, Denise (2005). "El miedo a la multitud. Dos provincianos en el Estadio Nacional, 1950–1970". In Rosas Lauro, Claudia (ed.). El Miedo en el Perú: Siglos XVI al XX (in Spanish). Lima: PUCP Fondo Editorial. ISBN 9972-42-690-4.
- Lennox, Doug (2009). Now You Know Soccer. Toronto: Dundurn Press Limited. ISBN 978-1-55488-416-2.
- Llopis, Ramón (2009). Fútbol Postnacional: Transformaciones Sociales y Culturales del "Deporte Global" en Europa y América Latina (in Spanish). Barcelona: Anthropos Editorial. ISBN 978-84-7658-937-3.
- Mandell, Richard (1987). The Nazi Olympics. Champaign: University of Illinois Press. ISBN 0-252-01325-5.
- Miró, César (1958). Los Intimos de La Victoria (in Spanish). Lima: Editorial El Deporte.
- Murray, William (1994). Football: A History of the World Game. Aldershot: Scolar Press. ISBN 1-85928-091-9.
- Panfichi, Aldo; Vich, Victor (2005). "Political and Social Fantasies in Peruvian Football: The Tragedy of Alianza Lima in 1987". In Darby, Paul; Johnes, Martin; Mellor, Gavin (eds.). Soccer and Disaster: International Perspectives. New York: Routledge. ISBN 0-7146-5352-7.
- Radnedge, Keir (2001). The Illustrated Encyclopedia of Soccer. New York: Universe Publishing. ISBN 978-0-7893-0670-8.
- Snyder, John (2001). Soccer's Most Wanted. Washington, D.C.: Potomac Books, Inc. ISBN 978-1-57488-365-7.
- Stein, Steve (2011). "The Case of Soccer in Early Twentieth-Century Lima". In Stavans, Ilan (ed.). Fútbol. Santa Barbara: ABC-CLIO, LLC. ISBN 978-0-313-37515-6.
- Thorndike, Guillermo (1978). El Revés de Morir (in Spanish). Lima: Mosca Azul Editores.
- Witzig, Richard (2006). The Global Art of Soccer. Harahan: CusiBoy Publishing. ISBN 0-9776688-0-0.
- Wood, David (2007). "¡Arriba Perú! The Role of Football in the Formation of a Peruvian National Culture". In Miller, Rory; Crolley, Liz (eds.). Football in the Americas. London: Institute for the Study of the Americas. ISBN 978-1-900039-80-2.
