= Lima Consensus =

The "Lima Consensus" (Spanish: consenso de Lima), a term coined by Harvard University government professor Steven Levitsky, refers to a laissez‑faire economic policy consensus, intended to promote economic growth. Similar to the "Washington Consensus," the Lima Consensus is defined by support for deregulatory policies, export-led growth, and resource extraction as part of a broad support for free market capitalism.

In 1990, Fujimori's government applied neoliberal policies, including shock therapy measures colloquially known as the "fujishock," announced in August 1990 by Economy Minister Juan Carlos Hurtado Miller. The economist Hernando de Soto served as an informal adviser who recommended orthodox measures and arranged Fujimori's meetings with the IMF, World Bank and Inter-American Development Bank. Consequently, these measures bolstered Peru's attractiveness for foreign investors. While the early 2000s saw a regional shift towards left-wing governments, termed the 'pink tide,' the Lima Consensus remained largely unchallenged since its inception in the early 1990s. Nevertheless, the presidencies of Pedro Castillo (2021–2022) and, to some extent, Ollanta Humala (2011–2016), are noted for their opposition.

Critics argue that it has amplified economic inequality, weakened state institutions, and contributed to crony capitalism, rising crime, political corruption and deteriorating labor rights, and that rights have been sidelined in favor of market liberalization and capital interests. Supporters argue that these policies lead to economic growth and macroeconomic stability.

== Background ==
The belief of limited state intervention held by the elite is due to frequent commodity booms, the weakness of the government, social disparities and the lack of national economists. The Government of Peru displayed little interference in the public sector throughout the nation's history since Peru frequently experienced commodities booms that benefitted white elites on the coast instead of the indigenous majority in rural areas, with businesses focusing on bringing commodities from inland Peru to export on the coast. According to Orihuela, this elite consensus - that national economic progress "demands little state intervention" - persisted throughout Peruvian history and limited demand for industrial policy and state-building.

Peru experienced limited government interaction in the public sector until 1968 when the military junta leadership of General Juan Velasco Alvarado began, with state capitalism and heavy spending instituted that resulted in large national debt. Political scandals resulted in the end of the junta and the Lost Decade of the 1980s began, with President Fernando Belaúnde Terry failing to develop an effective economic policy and his successor Alan García experiencing the complete deterioration of the state due to corruption, hyperinflation and the internal conflict in Peru.

=== Plan Verde ===
The Peruvian armed forces grew frustrated with the inability of the García administration to handle the nation's crises and began to draft a plan to overthrow his government. According to Peruvian sociologist and political analyst Fernando Rospigliosi, Peru's business elites held relationships with the military planners, with Rospigliosi writing that businesses "probably provided the economic ideas which [the military] agreed with, the necessity of a liberal economic program as well as the installment of an authoritarian government which would impose order". Thus, Plan Verde was drafted at the end of the García presidency. The objectives evolved into establishing a civilian-military government with a neoliberal economic policy, the control or censorship of media, and, according to sociologist Pierre Gaussens, an explicit genocidal intention toward impoverished and indigenous Peruvians.

During his campaigning for the 1990 Peruvian general election, Alberto Fujimori expressed concern against the proposed neoliberal policies of his opponent Mario Vargas Llosa and promised not to use shock therapy on Peru's economy. Peruvian magazine Oiga reported that following the election, the armed forces were unsure of Fujimori's willingness to fulfill their objectives outlined in Plan Verde and that they held a negotiatory meeting with him to ensure that Fujimori followed their direction. Fujimori would go on to adopt many of the policies outlined in Plan Verde.

== Implementation ==
The Lima Consensus as established by the Fujimori administration focused on deregulation and privatization with the goal of establishing a neoliberal economy. Fujimori and the Consensus experienced support as the public began to distrust left wing groups following the Velasco dictatorship and due to actions of communist guerrillas during the internal conflict. As the Fujimori government began to implement their economic policy, his administration attempted to rewrite Peru's economic history, with Minister of the Economy Carlos Boloña inaccurately stating "during the three decades that preceded to date, populist, socialist or mercantilist ideas and governments exercised almost absolute predominance in our country". Fujimori then instituted economic shock therapy policies described as "Fujishock"; Peru experienced macroeconomic stability though millions of Peruvians were instantly sent into poverty. The dismantling of political parties in the 1990s resulted in weaker politicians entering politics in the twenty-first century, since technocrats from Fujimori's government would go on to promote the Consensus and dominate politics in Peru.

The Lima Consensus is a more radical manifestation of the Washington Consensus due to its proactive push for economic liberalization and a limited—and often ineffective—level of state regulation or institutional fortification.

As the Washington Consensus lost popularity in the 2000s, a more defined Lima Consensus began to emerge in Peru simultaneously as the economy improved during the 2000s commodities boom. The economic boom Peru experienced did not develop a stronger government, however, with deregulation and privatization becoming more established following the fall of the Fujimori government while elites supporting the Consensus gained veto power in the government. Governments in the early twenty-first century also underfunded social programs such as education, healthcare and poverty programs, with Peru spending much below the Latin American average. Alejandro Toledo continued to promote the decentralization of Peru, while the former social democrat Alan García took implementation of the consensus even further - La República likened his economic policies to those of Pinochet - and clashed with indigenous groups opposed to mining in their communities, events culminating in the 2009 Bagua clashes over oil and mining development in the Amazon, in which official counts recorded 23 police officers and 10 civilians killed, with Indigenous organizations alleging a higher toll. The Consensus effectively paralyzed the government of Ollanta Humala. Keiko Fujimori, the daughter of Alberto Fujimori, has been a major proponent of the Lima Consensus, using the support of neoliberal economist Hernando de Soto to support her position during her elections. In 2020, the Congress of Peru refused to ratify the Escazú Agreement regarding environmental rights due to the beliefs surrounding the Lima Consensus, arguing that it would violate the sovereignty of Peru.

Following the 2021 Peruvian general election that saw leftist candidate Pedro Castillo elected to the presidency, Fitch Solutions warned that his election posed "substantial risks to the 'Lima Consensus', the investor-friendly economic policy framework that has persisted over the last 20 years".

== Analysis ==
According to journalist Simeon Tegel, "much of Peru's recent growth has come from high commodity prices and the informal entrepreneurism of ordinary Peruvians." The International Monetary Fund, however, attributes 2000s growth to both favorable terms of trade and reform, finding that Peru "achieved growth rates higher than would be predicted by the prevailing strong TOT [terms of trade], reflecting a significant structural reform agenda that also supported the expansion of the non-mining economy."

=== Economic and institutional assessments ===
According to a 2025 analysis by the European University Institute's Florence School of Banking and Finance, the Central Reserve Bank of Peru (BCRP)'s success depended on the independence granted by the reforms of the 1990s, as well as on the leadership of Julio Velarde, who has headed the bank since 2006. Average annual inflation peaked at 7,650% in 1990; under the 1993 Constitution the BCRP was granted operational independence, and it adopted an inflation-targeting regime in 2002. The OECD reported in 2025 that inflation "remains under control thanks to a credible inflation targeting regime under an independent Central Bank," that "public debt is low by regional standards," and that real GDP growth "averaged 3.7%… between 2008 and 2024, one of the highest in Latin America." The OECD also found that "fiscal discipline has weakened," that tax revenues were "only 17% of GDP," and that informality affected "over 70% of workers." On 25 April 2024, S&P Global Ratings lowered Peru's long-term foreign-currency rating to BBB−, its lowest investment grade, "reflecting that a fragmented Congress and limited political capital of the administration weigh on private-sector investment sentiment."

According to the World Bank's Rising Strong: Peru Poverty and Equity Assessment (2023), poverty fell "from 59 percent to 20 percent" between 2004 and 2019, "owing mainly to vigorous economic growth," before rising to 26% in 2021 during the COVID-19 pandemic. The World Bank also reported that four in ten Peruvians were at risk of falling into poverty, the highest level since 2004. According to official figures from Peru's statistics agency, INEI, monetary poverty rose from 27.5% in 2022 to 29.0% in 2023, then fell to 27.6% in 2024 and 25.7% in 2025 - still above the 20.2% recorded in 2019. The OECD found Peru's tax-to-GDP ratio was 17.0% in 2023, below the Latin American and Caribbean average of 21.3%, and Peru was one of seven regional economies to register a decline between 2014 and 2024.

Levitsky argued that Peru's discontent "is rooted in state weakness" - the inability of state institutions to perform basic tasks such as collecting taxes, building roads, implementing social programs, providing public security and enforcing the rule of law - and that Peruvian social spending was "about 8 percent of GDP… barely half the Latin American average." Political scientist Yusuke Murakami, in a book published by the Institute of Peruvian Studies, describes neoliberal policy as having functioned as the governments' "autopilot" and as having left underlying structural inequality unaddressed. The 2023 Latinobarómetro survey found only 8% of Peruvians satisfied with the functioning of democracy, against a Latin American average of 28% and the lowest level in the region. The Ombudsman's Office (Defensoría del Pueblo) reported that socio-environmental disputes were the most numerous category of social conflict - 51.3% of cases as of January 2026 - and that mining-related socio-environmental conflicts accounted for 33.2% of all reported social conflicts. During the 2022–2023 protests, Peru's Ombudsman's Office recorded 49 protesters and bystanders killed, most of them rural workers and Indigenous people in southern Peru, according to Human Rights Watch; the UN Human Rights Office recorded 50 killed. Government officials attributed some deaths to protesters' homemade weapons or to arms smuggled from Bolivia; Human Rights Watch said these claims were made without proof and were refuted by the evidence it gathered.

Other scholars locate the main causes of Peru's recent instability in its political institutions. Political scientists Rodrigo Barrenechea and Alberto Vergara argue that Peruvian democracy is decaying through a dilution rather than a concentration of power, driven by electoral fragmentation, political amateurism and weak links between politicians and society. Analysts have also pointed to the presidential vacancy clause for "permanent moral incapacity" in Article 113 of the 1993 Constitution, a nineteenth-century provision that Congress revived against Alberto Fujimori in 2000 and that has been invoked repeatedly against presidents since 2016; political scientist Fernando Tuesta has described its use as the central mechanism of Peru's governing crisis. Former economy minister Pedro Francke identified the clause as one of two structural sources of instability, the other being citizens' mistrust of their institutions, which he links to a patrimonial state and "serious ethnic and regional inequalities."

Scholars including Levitsky and Cameron, and Vergara, have characterized post-Fujimori Peru as a "democracy without parties," and the IMF describes the recurring presidential vacancies since 2017 as an institutional crisis weighing on investment.
