= Peru national football team records and statistics =

This is a list of statistical records of the Peru national football team.

== Player records ==
As of 14 November 2026
Players in bold are still active with Peru.

=== Most appearances ===
Rank	Player	Caps	Goals	Career
1	**Yoshimar Yotún**	139	8	2011–present
2	**Pedro Gallese**	131	0	2014–present
3	**Luis Advíncula**	130	2	2010–present
4	Paolo Guerrero	128	40	2004–2025
4	Roberto Palacios	128	19	1992–2012
6	**André Carrillo**	109	11	2011–present
7	Héctor Chumpitaz	105	3	1965–1981
8	Jefferson Farfán	102	27	2003–2021
9	Jorge Soto	101	9	1992–2005
10	Christian Cueva	100	16	2011–2024

=== Most goals ===
Rank	Player	Goals	Caps	Ratio	Career
1	Paolo Guerrero (list)	40	128	0.31	2004–2025
2	Jefferson Farfán	27	102	0.26	2003–2021
3	Teófilo Cubillas	26	81	0.32	1968–1982
4	Teodoro Fernández	24	32	0.75	1935–1947
5	Claudio Pizarro	20	85	0.24	1999–2016
5	Nolberto Solano	20	95	0.21	1994–2008
7	Roberto Palacios	19	128	0.15	1992–2012
8	Hugo Sotil	18	62	0.29	1970–1978
9	Oswaldo Ramírez	17	57	0.3	1969–1982
9	**Edison Flores**	17	84	0.2	2013–present

== Competition records ==
=== FIFA World Cup ===
FIFA World Cup record										Qualification record						
Year	Host	Round	Pld	W	D	L	GF	GA	Squad	Pos.	Pld	W	D	L	GF	GA
1930	Uruguay	Group stage	2	0	0	2	1	4	Squad	Qualified as invitees						
1934	Italy	Withdrew								Withdrew						
1938	France	Did not enter								Did not enter						
1950	Brazil	Withdrew								Withdrew						
1954	Switzerland	Withdrew								Withdrew						
1958	Sweden	Did not qualify								2nd	2	0	1	1	1	2
1962	Chile	Did not qualify								2nd	2	0	1	1	1	2
1966	England	Did not qualify								2nd	4	2	0	2	8	6
1970	Mexico	Quarter-finals	4	2	0	2	9	9	Squad	1st	4	2	1	1	7	4
1974	West Germany	Did not qualify								Play-off	3	1	0	2	3	4
1978	Argentina	Quarter-finals (Note: Last 8 held as second group stage.)	6	2	1	3	7	12	Squad	2nd	6	3	2	1	13	3
1982	Spain	Group stage	3	0	2	1	2	6	Squad	1st	4	2	2	0	5	2
1986	Mexico	Did not qualify								Play-offs	8	3	2	3	10	9
1990	Italy	Did not qualify								3rd	4	0	0	4	2	8
1994	United States	Did not qualify								4th	6	0	1	5	4	12
1998	France	Did not qualify								5th	16	7	4	5	19	20
2002	South Korea; Japan	Did not qualify								8th	18	4	4	10	14	25
2006	Germany	Did not qualify								9th	18	4	6	8	20	28
2010	South Africa	Did not qualify								10th	18	3	4	11	11	34
2014	Brazil	Did not qualify								7th	16	4	3	9	17	26
2018	Russia	Group stage	3	1	0	2	2	2	Squad	Play-off	20	8	6	6	29	26
2022	Qatar	Did not qualify								Play-off	19	7	4	8	19	22
2026	Canada; Mexico; United States	Did not qualify								9th	18	2	6	10	6	21
2030	Morocco; Portugal; Spain	To be determined								To be determined						
2034	Saudi Arabia	To be determined								To be determined						
Total		Quarter-finals	18	5	3	10	21	33	—	5/23	186	52	47	87	189	254

=== Copa América ===
South American Championship / Copa América record
Year	Round	Position	Pld	W	D*	L	GF	GA	Squad
(Argentina) 1916	Did not participate								
(Uruguay) 1917	Did not participate								
(Brazil) 1919	Did not participate								
(Chile) 1920	Did not participate								
(Argentina) 1921	Did not participate								
(Brazil) 1922	Did not participate								
(Uruguay) 1923	Did not participate								
(Uruguay) 1924	Did not participate								
(Argentina) 1925	Did not participate								
(Chile) 1926	Did not participate								
(Peru) 1927	Third place	3rd	3	1	0	2	4	11	Squad
(Argentina) 1929	Fourth place	4th	3	0	0	3	1	12	Squad
(Peru) 1935	Third place	3rd	3	1	0	2	2	5	Squad
(Argentina) 1937	Sixth place	6th	5	1	1	3	7	10	Squad
(Peru) 1939	Champions	1st	4	4	0	0	13	4	Squad
(Chile) 1941	Fourth place	4th	4	1	0	3	5	5	Squad
(Uruguay) 1942	Fifth place	5th	6	1	2	3	5	10	Squad
(Chile) 1945	Withdrew								
(Argentina) 1946	Withdrew								
(Ecuador) 1947	Fifth place	5th	7	2	2	3	12	9	Squad
(Brazil) 1949	Third place	3rd	7	5	0	2	20	13	Squad
(Peru) 1953	Fifth place	5th	6	3	1	2	4	6	Squad
(Chile) 1955	Third place	3rd	5	2	2	1	13	11	Squad
(Uruguay) 1956	Sixth place	6th	5	0	1	4	6	11	Squad
(Peru) 1957	Fourth place	4th	6	4	0	2	12	9	Squad
(Argentina) 1959	Fourth place	4th	6	1	3	2	10	11	Squad
(Ecuador) 1959	Withdrew								
(Bolivia) 1963	Fifth place	5th	6	2	1	3	8	11	Squad
(Uruguay) 1967	Withdrew								
1975	Champions	1st	9	6	1	2	14	7	Squad
1979	Fourth place	4th	2	0	1	1	1	2	Squad
1983	Third place	3rd	6	2	3	1	7	6	Squad
(Argentina) 1987	Group stage	6th	2	0	2	0	2	2	Squad
(Brazil) 1989	Group stage	8th	4	0	3	1	4	7	Squad
(Chile) 1991	Group stage	8th	4	1	0	3	9	9	Squad
(Ecuador) 1993	Quarter-finals	7th	4	1	2	1	4	5	Squad
(Uruguay) 1995	Group stage	10th	3	0	1	2	2	5	Squad
(Bolivia) 1997	Fourth place	4th	6	3	0	3	5	11	Squad
(Paraguay) 1999	Quarter-finals	7th	4	2	1	1	7	6	Squad
(Colombia) 2001	Quarter-finals	8th	4	1	1	2	4	8	Squad
(Peru) 2004	Quarter-finals	7th	4	1	2	1	7	6	Squad
(Venezuela) 2007	Quarter-finals	7th	4	1	1	2	5	8	Squad
(Argentina) 2011	Third place	3rd	6	3	1	2	8	5	Squad
(Chile) 2015	Third place	3rd	6	3	1	2	8	5	Squad
(United States) 2016	Quarter-finals	5th	4	2	2	0	4	2	Squad
(Brazil) 2019	Runners-up	2nd	6	2	2	2	7	9	Squad
(Brazil) 2021	Fourth place	4th	7	2	2	3	10	14	Squad
(United States) 2024	Group stage	13th	3	0	1	2	0	3	Squad
Total	2 Titles	34 / 48	164	58	40	66	229	256	—

== Head-to-head results ==
As of 14 November 2026 after the match against Bolivia.

Key
Positive balance (more Wins)
Neutral balance (Wins = Losses)
Negative balance (more Losses)

Chile–Peru football rivalry

Ecuador–Peru football rivalry

Nations	Pld	W	D	L	GF	GA	GD	Win %	Confederation
Algeria	1	0	1	0	1	1	+0	0.00	CAF
Argentina	56	5	14	37	45	110	−65	8.93	CONMEBOL
Armenia	1	1	0	0	4	0	+4	100.00	UEFA
Australia	2	1	1	0	2	0	+2	50.00	AFC
Austria	1	1	0	0	4	2	+2	100.00	UEFA
Belarus	1	0	1	0	1	1	+0	0.00	UEFA
Belgium	1	0	1	0	1	1	+0	0.00	UEFA
Bolivia	55	28	12	15	87	50	+37	50.91	CONMEBOL
Brazil	52	5	9	38	33	114	−81	9.62	CONMEBOL
Bulgaria	5	2	1	2	11	11	+0	40.00	UEFA
Cameroon	1	0	1	0	0	0	+0	0.00	CAF
Canada	3	1	0	2	2	3	−1	33.33	CONCACAF
Chile	88	24	16	48	111	138	−27	27.27	CONMEBOL
China	2	1	0	1	3	4	−1	50.00	AFC
Colombia	63	17	24	22	66	74	−8	26.98	CONMEBOL
Costa Rica	8	5	1	2	15	9	+6	62.50	CONCACAF
Croatia	1	1	0	0	2	0	+2	100.00	UEFA
Czech Republic/Czechoslovakia	4	1	1	2	3	6	−3	25.00	UEFA
Denmark	2	0	0	2	1	3	−2	0.00	UEFA
Dominican Republic	1	1	0	0	4	1	+3	100.00	CONCACAF
Ecuador	54	21	16	17	81	69	+12	38.89	CONMEBOL
El Salvador	7	5	0	2	15	6	+9	71.43	CONCACAF
England	3	1	0	2	4	8	−4	33.33	UEFA
Finland	1	1	0	0	7	3	+4	100.00	UEFA
France	2	1	0	1	1	1	+0	50.00	UEFA
Germany/West Germany	3	0	0	3	2	7	−5	0.00	UEFA
Guatemala	4	3	1	0	8	2	+6	75.00	CONCACAF
Haiti	6	4	2	0	13	6	+7	66.67	CONCACAF
Honduras	9	2	5	2	12	12	+0	22.22	CONCACAF
Hungary	2	2	0	0	5	3	+2	100.00	UEFA
India	1	1	0	0	1	0	+1	100.00	AFC
Iceland	1	1	0	0	3	1	+2	100.00	UEFA
Iran	1	1	0	0	4	1	+3	100.00	AFC
Iraq	1	1	0	0	2	0	+2	100.00	AFC
Italy	1	0	1	0	1	1	+0	0.00	UEFA
Jamaica	4	3	1	0	9	3	+6	75.00	CONCACAF
Japan	8	3	3	2	6	8	−2	37.50	AFC
Mexico	30	9	9	12	33	39	−6	30.00	CONCACAF
Morocco	2	1	1	0	3	0	+3	50.00	CAF
Netherlands	4	0	1	3	1	7	−6	0.00	UEFA
New Zealand	3	2	1	0	3	0	+3	66.67	OFC
Nicaragua	1	1	0	0	2	0	+2	100.00	CONCACAF
Nigeria	1	1	0	0	1	0	+1	100.00	CAF
Panama	9	6	1	2	20	7	+13	66.67	CONCACAF
Paraguay	59	18	17	24	67	78	−11	30.51	CONMEBOL
Poland	3	0	0	3	2	9	−7	0.00	UEFA
Qatar	1	1	0	0	2	0	+2	100.00	AFC
Romania	5	1	2	2	6	8	−2	20.00	UEFA
Russia/Soviet Union	4	0	2	2	1	5	−4	0.00	UEFA
Saudi Arabia	1	1	0	0	3	0	+3	100.00	AFC
Scotland	4	2	1	1	6	4	+2	50.00	UEFA
Senegal	1	0	0	1	0	2	−2	0.00	CAF
Serbia/Yugoslavia	1	0	0	1	1	2	−1	0.00	UEFA
Slovakia	2	2	0	0	3	1	+2	100.00	UEFA
South Korea	2	1	1	0	1	0	+1	50.00	AFC
Spain	4	0	0	4	4	10	−6	0.00	UEFA
Sweden	1	0	1	0	0	0	+0	0.00	UEFA
Switzerland	1	0	0	1	0	2	−2	0.00	UEFA
Trinidad and Tobago	5	3	1	1	11	3	+8	60.00	CONCACAF
Tunisia	1	0	1	0	1	1	+0	0.00	CAF
United Arab Emirates	1	0	1	0	0	0	+0	0.00	AFC
Uruguay	71	16	16	39	61	114	−53	22.54	CONMEBOL
United States	8	2	2	4	8	12	−4	25.00	CONCACAF
Venezuela	39	23	7	9	65	42	+23	58.97	CONMEBOL
