= Communism in Peru =

Flag of the Communist Party of Peru, also called "Shining Path"

Communism as a political philosophy in Peru dates back to the 1920s, a period when new ideological currents entered the country.

Throughout the movement's history, a number of parties, movements and organisations in the country have referred to themselves by the name of "communist party". The first to do so is the Peruvian Communist Party (Partido Comunista Peruano, PCP), originally founded in 1928 as the Peruvian Socialist Party (PSP) by Marxist philosopher and journalist José Carlos Mariátegui. The 1960s brought about the emergence of splinter groups up until the 21st century. One of these groups, commonly known as the Shining Path (PCP-SL), waged an insurgency against the Peruvian State that resulted in a 20-year period of violence that took place from 1980 to 2000, while its splinter groups have continued to operate from 2001 onwards.

== History ==
The first Peruvian political party to adopt communism as an ideology was the Peruvian Communist Party (Partido Comunista Peruano, PCP). It was originally founded as the Peruvian Socialist Party (PSP) in 1928 by a group of nine socialist sympathisers (known as the "Group of Lima"), which included Marxist philosopher and journalist José Carlos Mariátegui, and formally changed its name in 1930, following Mariátegui's death and his succession by Eudocio Ravines as party leader.

During the presidency of Manuel Odría from 1948 to 1956 communism was illegal under Decree-Law 10980. This was then repealed under the second administration of Manuel Prado Ugarteche in 1956.

Peruvian reception for Marxism was increased by the 1959 victory of the Cuban revolution and Fidel Castro's declaration following Cuba's post-Bay of Pigs invasion declaration that he was a Marxist–Leninist and always would be.

In 1962, came the Fernando Belaúnde Terry's administration which was tolerant of the political left, and a variety of Marxist parties expanded during his time in office. As the PCP gradually incorporated itself into the legal political scene during the 1960s, some partisans were disappointed with its so-called bureaucratic and collaborationist character, believing that guerrilla warfare was the only path to the establishment of a socialist state. In 1962, a faction split and formed the National Liberation Army (ELN) a year later, which led such a military campaign until its defeat by 1965.

In 1963, the ongoing Sino-Soviet split separated the PCP into two rival factions, one pro-Soviet and the other pro-Chinese. The latter subsequently split from the Peruvian Communist Party in January 1964 and adopted the name Peruvian Communist Party – Red Flag (PCP-BR). The party was originally led by Saturnino Paredes, José Sotomayor, and Abimael Guzmán. Due to internal disagreements among the party's three leaders, the party expelled several of its members in its early history. Two parties subsequently emerged from a 1969 split in the party: the Communist Party of Peru – Red Fatherland (PCP-PR) and the Communist Party of Peru – Shining Path (PCP-SL) (Note: Self-proclaimed as the "Communist Party of Peru" (PCP), but otherwise known as the "Shining Path" (SL).) led by Guzmán. Afterwards, Paredes became the party's sole leader and renamed the party "Peruvian Communist Party (Marxist–Leninist)". In response to the Sino-Albanian split, the party dropped its commitment to Maoism and aligned itself with the Party of Labour of Albania and Hoxhaism. In 1978, the "PCP-Mayoría" faction split from the PCP to form a more pro-Soviet branch, as it considered that the PCP had adopted Eurocommunism instead, operating until the 1980s.

The elections of 1980 formally ended the so-called Revolutionary Government of Francisco Morales Bermúdez, who had seized power from Juan Velasco Alvarado through a military coup in 1975. The previously banned socialist and communist parties participated in the elections, leading to the PCP attaining five seats in the constituent assembly, while left-wing groups as a whole achieved an important presence and united to form the United Left alliance, which formed one of the country's main political forces during the 1980s.

In contrast to the aforementioned legal route of the political left, Guzmán's PCP-SL began its war against the Peruvian government by burning ballots in Chuschi, a town in rural Ayacucho. Guzmán's faction considered the political left revisionists, openly and actively opposing them through its period of insurgency. The Shining Path's leadership was captured and arrested by the Special Intelligence Group in 1992 and entered amnesty talks the following year. Rump factions of the group that opposed the peace talks have since continued a low-intensity insurgency that continues to this day, allying themselves with narcoterrorist groups in rural parts of the country, notably the Valle de los Ríos Apurímac, Ene y Mantaro (VRAEM). During the internal conflict, volunteers, peasants, and armed civilians styled themselves the Anti-Senderista Army and carried out a massacre of the insurgents—who numbered fewer than 200,000 senderistas massacred. To break the enemy's morale, they employed tactics reminiscent of those used against the Chileans and the Royalists during the War of the Pacific and the Peruvian War of Independence, respectively, fueled by anti-Maoist and anti-Chinese hatred and a desire for revenge. Their method involved impalement, and—to undermine the insurgents' morale and ideology—the skulls of captured insurgents began to be used as war trophies.

Following the dissolution of the Soviet Union in 1991, the PCP and other communist parties in Peru have since participated at a much smaller level in the country's politics, mainly through broad left-wing political alliances.

== List of parties ==
A number of political parties claim the name and legacy of the original party founded in 1928, some using the original name. A number of electoral fronts and alliances have also brought together the aforementioned groups on different occasions. The following table includes both the parties and their alliances.

Name	Abbr.	Active		Notes
Name	Abbr.	Start	End	Notes
Partido Comunista Peruano (Note: The name "Socialist Vanguard Party" was also used in 1945 in order to facilitate its legal registration that year.)	PCP (Note: The group is also known as "PCP-Unidad" to distinguish it from other groups.)	1928	No	Known as the Peruvian Socialist Party until 1930.
Partido Obrero Revolucionario	POR (Note: Formerly "GOM".)	1944	1963	Known as the Marxist Workers Group until 1946.
APRA Rebelde (Note: Formally the "Aprista Committee for the Defense of Doctrinal Principles and Internal Democracy")	APRA	1959	1962	Split from APRA; later became the MIR.
Partido Comunista Peruano (Marxista–Leninista)	PCPML (Note: Formerly "PCP-BR".)	1964	No	Known as the Peruvian Communist Party – Red Flag until 1969.
Vanguardia Revolucionaria	VR	1965	1984	
Partido Comunista del Perú – Patria Roja	PCP-PR	1970	No	Expelled from PCPML in 1969.
Partido Comunista del Perú (Note: Better known as the Shining Path (Spanish: Sendero Luminoso).)	PCP (Note: Otherwise known as the "PCP-SL" or simply as the "SL".)	1970	1992 (Note: Its leadership was captured in 1992 and remnants have continued to take arms since.)	Expelled from PCPML in 1969 and became an armed group in 1980.
Partido Obrero Marxista Revolucionario	POMR	1970	1982	A majority faction eventually joined the PST.
Partido Comunista – Estrella Roja	PCP-ER	1971	1970s	Split from the PCP.
Partido Socialista de los Trabajadores	PST	1971	No	A member of LIT-CI; a pro-UIT-CI faction split in 1992.
Partido Comunista Revolucionario	PCR	1974	1990s	Split from the VR.
Partido Comunista Revolucionario - Trinchera Roja	PCR-TR	1977	1984	Split from the PCR and eventually joined the PUM.
Vanguardia Revolucionaria (Proletario Comunista)	VR-PC	1977	1980s	Dissolved and most of its members joined the Shining Path. A splinter group also existed.
Frente Obrero Campesino Estudiantil y Popular	FOCEP	1977	?	
Partido Comunista del Perú - Puka Llacta	PCP-PLL	1978	?	
Partido Comunista Peruano – Mayoría	PCP-Mayoría	1978	1980s	Split from the PCP under the leadership of Ventura Zegarra.
Partido Socialista Revolucionario (Marxista-Leninista)	PSR(M-L)	1978	?	Split from the PSR
Partido Revolucionario de los Trabajadores	PRT	1978	1980s	
Partido Comunista Revolucionario - Clase Obrera	PCR-CO	1970s	?	
Izquierda Unida	IU	1980	1995	Political alliance; (Note: Composed of UID, UNIR, PCP, PSR, PCR, FOCEP and PUM.) gained a strong political presence in the 1980s.
Unión de Izquierda Revolucionaria	UNIR (Note: Also UIR)	1980	1993	Political alliance; (Note: Composed of PCP-PR, VR-PC, and FLN.) part of IU.
Partido Unificado Mariateguista	PUM	1984	1996	
Partido Proletario del Perú	PPP	1990	No	Headed by Illipa Tuta.
Militarizado Partido Comunista del Perú	MPCP	1992	No	Operates as a militant group.
Frente Democrático del Pueblo	FDP	2000	No	Political wing of the defunct MRTA.
Partido Político Nacional Perú Libre	PL	2008	No	

== See also ==
- Anarchism in Peru
- Gonzalo Thought
- Shining Path
- José Carlos Mariátegui
