= Ricardo Letts Colmenares =

Peruvian politician (1937–2021)

National Agrarian University

Ricardo Letts Colmenares (August 9, 1937 – May 18, 2021) was a Peruvian politician, journalist and left-wing militant. He was a founder of the Vanguardia Revolucionaria movement.

== Childhood and youth ==
Born in Lima, his parents were Roberto Letts Sánchez, an agricultural businessman and Josefina Colmenares Castro, a housewife devoted to her family. He was the fourth of nine children.

Ricardo Letts studied elementary education at Villa María and Inmaculado Corazón school, and high school at Colegio Santa María, both in Lima. He did his undergraduate studies at the Escuela Nacional de Agricultura de La Molina – ENA (National School of Agriculture, today the La Molina National Agrarian University). In 1959, he finished his studies of agronomy and started working as manager at the Compañía Agrícola La Mina (La Mina Agricultural Company), Sayán (1960–1962). In 1963, he obtained his professional degree as an Agricultural Engineer with his thesis “Economic and Political Justification of the Peruvian Agrarian Reform”.

== Student leader (1956–1959) ==
Between the years of 1956 and 1959, Ricardo Letts was a student leader at the ENA. In 1959, he was elected President of the Student Union and participated as leader in the student and teachers movement of the ENA, which forced the ENA director to renounce his position in 1958, initiating a reform in the institution in 1959.

== Acción Popular (Popular Action) (1961–1965) ==
In 1961, Letts joined the Acción Popular party and was head of the Chancay Provincial Committee of Acción Popular. He participated in the III National Congress of Acción Popular held in Iquitos. He met Fernando Belaúnde Terry during the trip travelling to Iquitos. Between 1962 and 1963, he worked in the Agrarian Reform and Colonization Institute as a researcher, working on the preliminary report about the Land Tenure Situation in Peru. He was elected National Secretary of Peasant Affairs of Acción Popular. Months later, Letts was elected National Chairman of the Youth Command of Acción Popular. In 1963, he started working for the Cooperación Popular (Popular Cooperation) organization. In 1964, he was promoted to Secretary General of Cooperación Popular, but in February and April 1965, in the midst of a serious political conflict, he withdrew from both Acción Popular and Cooperación Popular. In April of the same year he married María Luisa Raygada.

== Vanguardia Revolucionaria (Revolutionary Vanguard) (1965–1984) ==
On May 30, 1965, Ricardo Letts founded Vanguardia Revolucionaria together with Ricardo Napurí, Edmundo Murrugarra, Efraín Franco, Antonio Lobato and others. In August of the same year, Letts was arrested and accused of collaborating with the Movimiento de Izquierda Revolucionaria – MIR (Revolutionary Left Movement) and the Ejército de Liberación Nacional - ELN (National Liberation Army) guerrilla movements. He was set free and in February 1966 left for Paris as an exile. He then traveled to Cuba and went through a training program in the so-called Guerrilla School (1966–1967) of military guerrilla groups for the revolutionary struggle in Peru. Letts also undertook postgraduate studies in Marxism and Socialist Economy in the Practical School of Advanced Studies at the Sorbonne in Paris (1966–1968). He was elected Secretary General of Vanguardia Revolucionaria in the II Congress in 1968.

== Agrarian leader ==
Ricardo Letts was a consultant to the Confederación Campesina del Perú – CCP (Peasant Confederation of Peru) (1962–1977). Since 1995 he became a member of the Consultative Council. He was also president of the Consejo Unitario Nacional Agrario - CUNA (National Unitary Agrarian Council), (1985–1990). On behalf of the CCP, Letts was president of the Popular National Assembly (1987–1990). He was the chief executive officer of the agricultural company Huerto Alamein SAC, since 1981. Since 1997, he was also president of the Asociación Nacional de Productores y Exportadores de Aceituna Peruana - ANPEAP (National Association of Producers and Exporters of Peruvian Olives). In the period 1998-2002, he was Secretary of the Convención Nacional del Agro Peruano (Agro Peruvian National Convention).

== Journalistic activities ==
Ricardo Letts has been editor and deputy editor of the weekly political news magazine “Marka” in Lima in 1975–1978 and again in 1983–1984. He was also Editor of the weekly political news magazine “Zurda” in Lima in 1978–1980.

== Other studies ==
Letts also did other postgraduate studies in the Escuela Superior de Administración de Negocios - ESAN (1995–1996), where he graduated with the thesis “Investment Project: Ecological Firewood”.

== Books ==
Ricardo Letts has published the following books:

- “La Reforma Agraria Peruana” (“The Peruvian Agrarian Reform”) (1961)
- “Justificación económica y política de la reforma agraria peruana“ (“Economic and Political Justification of the Peruvian Agrarian Reform”) (1963)
- “Perú, Revolución, Insurrección, Guerrillas” (“Perú, Revolution, Insurrection, Guerrilla”) (Paris, 1966)
- “Perú: El mito de la revolución militar” (“Peru: The Military Revolution Myth”) (Caracas, 1970)
- “Pérou: Révolution socialiste ou Caricature de révolution” – “Perú: Revolución Socialista o Caricatura de Revolución” (“Perú: Socialist Revolution or Caricature of Revolution” (Paris, 1971)
- “La Izquierda Peruana: Organizaciones y Tendencias” (“The Peruvian Left: Organizations and Tendencies”) (Lima, 1981).

== Politics ==
With regards to his political activity, Letts started working in Fernando Belaúnde Terry’s candidature (1956). After that, he was president of the Agricultural Student Union of the La Molina National School of Agriculture (1959). He became a leader of Acción Popular (1961–1965). In 1965, he left Belaunde’s party and founded Vanguardia Revolucionaria (VR), an emblematic party of the new left-wing in the 60’s, which remained until 1984. In that year, Vanguardia Revolucionaria joined both the MIR and the Partido Comunista Revolucionario – PCR (Revolutionary Communist Party) to form the Partido Unificado Mariateguista – PUM (Mariateguist Unified Party). In 1970, while Secretary General of Vanguardia Revolucionaria, he was arrested and deported to Colombia while he was en route to a public debate in a university round table. In 1974 he was arrested again after an intense activity supporting a peasant trade union organization and the land-taking movement in Andahuaylas. Letts took part in the National Unitary Command of Struggle in the strike of July 17, 1977, and also in the leading committee of the National Strike of May 23 and 24, 1978. He was arrested in May, some days before the 2nd national strike. He was deported and rendered to the Argentinian army in the barracks of Jujuy together with 12 other Peruvian leaders. In 1990, Letts was elected to the National Congress as deputy of Lima for the Izquierda Unida (United Left) party. He held this position until the closure of Congress in 1992. There, along with Lourdes Flores and Fernando Olivera, he led the triumphant constitutional charge for illicit enrichment against Alan García Pérez. Also, he led the interpellation and censure of the Minister of Agriculture Enrique Ross Link. He was one of the founders and leaders of the PUM (1984–1995). When Javier Diez Canseco proposed dissolving the PUM, he renounced at the same time that he was reaffirming his Socialist and Mariateguist principles in 1996.

== Assassination attempt (1991) ==
The 1970 deportation was a plot to murder him in flight from Panamá to Barranquilla. On October 13, 1991 Ricardo Letts received a “letter-bomb” intended to murder him. The letter-bomb was detected by his assistants and exploded when the UDEX (The Unit for Deactivation of Explosives) attempted to deactivate it. The same date and time that General Rodolfo Robles , who had denounced the Cantuta (12) assassinations, a missile was fired at Letts's olive orchard in Paracas. No one was hurt.

== His participation in international events ==
Ricardo Letts traveled to France invited by the National Assembly. He also traveled to the USA invited by the Department of the State, to China invited by the Chinese PC Central Committee and to Cuba several times between 1961 and 1994.

== Founder of the Comité Malpica (Malpica Committee) (1998) ==
In 1998, Ricardo Letts, together with Raúl Wiener, Delfina Paredes and others, founded the Comité Malpica – CM (Malpica Committee), a revolutionary political organization, whose name was adopted in memory of Carlos Malpica Silva Santisteban, a great fighter in favor of the people and the Peruvian nation. On July 28, 2000, Letts and the CM and the Popular Assembly of the San Martin Square participated in the Marcha de los Cuatro Suyos (Four Suyos March) and in the Popular Rebellion of Lima against the Fujimori regime. He publicly supported the idea of firing the National Jury of Elections building which was considered responsible for election fraud. In February 2001, on behalf of CM, Letts accused Alan García Pérez to the prosecutor on duty for the prison massacre and genocides of June 18 and 19, 1986. Between 2004 and 2005, he and the CM participated in the Movimiento del Frente Amplio - FA (Foundation Movement Broad Front) also conformed by the Movimiento Nueva Izquierda – MNI (New Left Movement), Partido Comunista del Perú – Patria Roja PCP(PR)(Communist Party of Peru - Red Fatherland), Partido Comunista del Perú – PCP (Peruvian Communist Party), Partido Socialista Revolucionario – PSR (Revolutionary Socialist Party), Frente Popular – FP (Popular Front), Frente Obrero Campesino del Perú – FOCEP (Peasant Labor Front of Peru), Movimiento Democrático Pueblo Unido – MDPU Democratic (Movement United People), and Partido Nacionalista de las Comunidades Andinas – PANACA (Nationalist Party of the Andean Communities). He left the FA since it refused to support the Ollanta Humala (OHT)’s presidential candidacy. He then led the CM to support OHT in the 1st and 2nd elections.

== His family ==
María Luisa Raygada, his first wife, died on February 8, 1977. They had had an only child named Rafael Alejandro Letts Raygada. He married Margarita Benavídes Matarazzo on June 23, 1979. Livia Ianesha Letts Benavídes, their only daughter, was born on May 21, 1982.

== Later years ==
On October 17, 2007, after 26 years of work, Ricardo Letts stopped being an olive producer. He also left the management of the ANPEAP and Convención Nacional del Agro Peruano – CONVEAGRO (National Convention of the Peruvian Agriculture), in order to spend all his time in the political struggle from the CM direction.
