= 1980 Peruvian general election =

- 18 May 1980
- Presidential election
- Turnout: 79.14% (▼15.24pp)
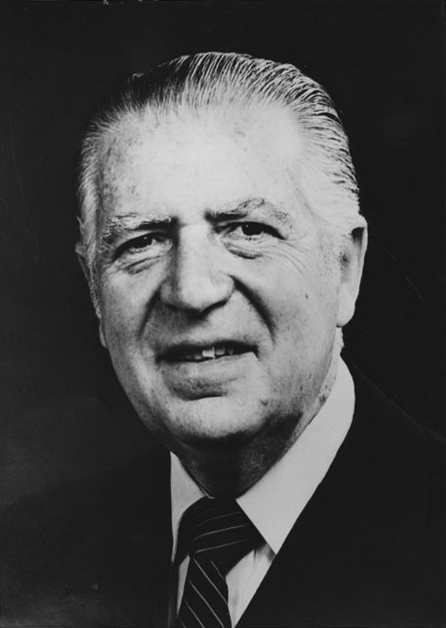

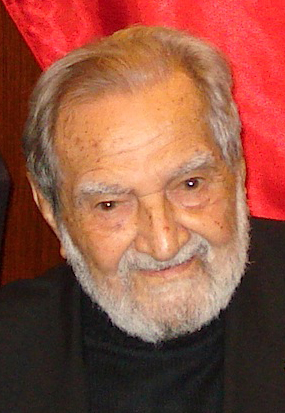
Nominee	Fernando Belaúnde Terry	Armando Villanueva
Party	Popular Action	APRA
Running mate	Fernando Schwalb; Javier Alva Orlandini
Popular vote	1,793,190	1,087,188
Percentage	44.93%	27.24%
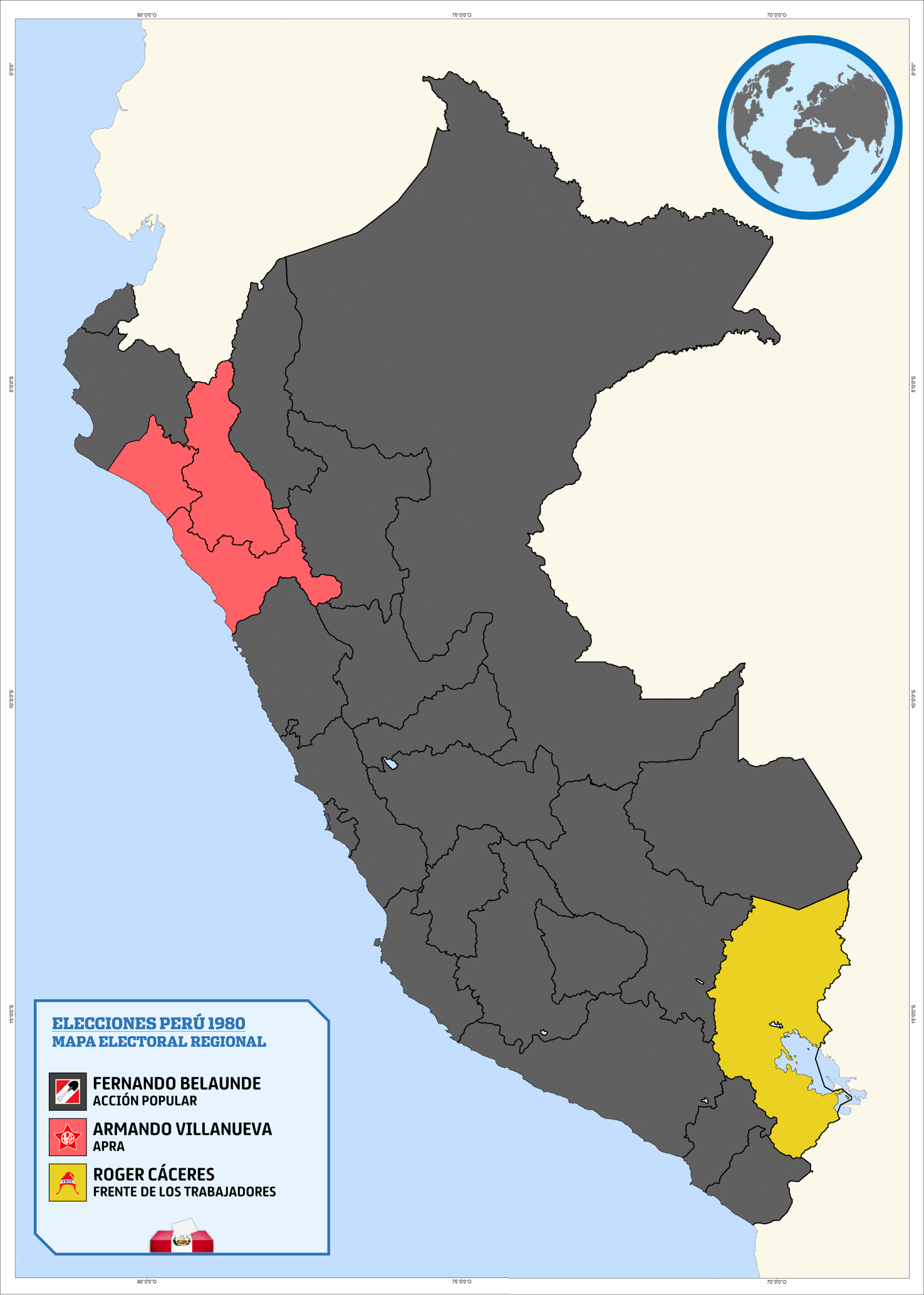
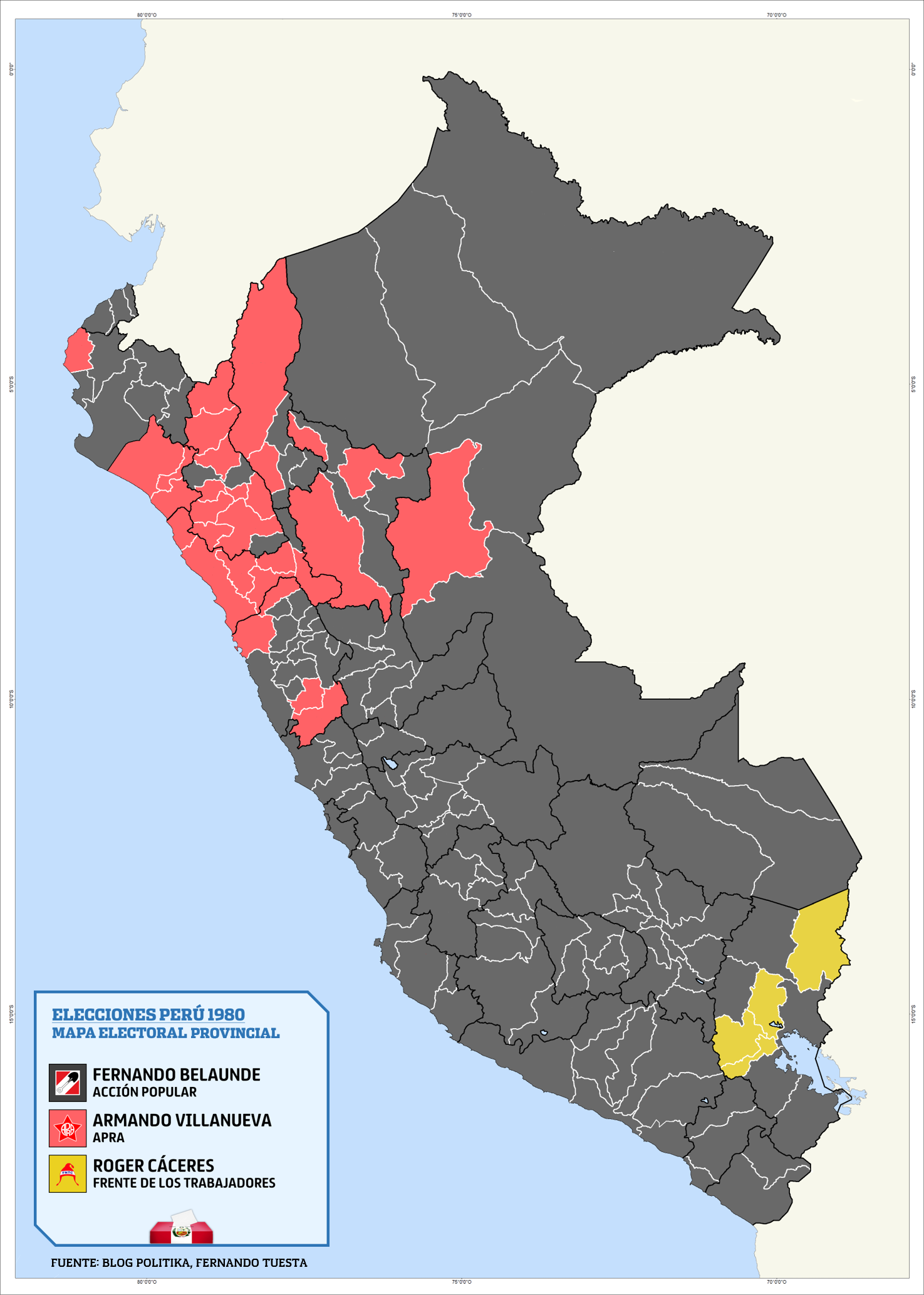
- Results by department (left) and province (right)
President before election
Francisco Morales Bermúdez
Revolutionary Government of the Armed Forces
Elected President
Fernando Belaúnde Terry
Popular Action
- Congressional election
Party	Leader	Vote %	Seats
Senate
Popular Action	Fernando Belaúnde	40.92	26
APRA	Armando Villanueva	27.62	18
PPC	Luis Bedoya Reyes	9.31	6
UNIR	Horacio Zevallos	4.56	2
PRT	Hugo Blanco	3.99	2
United Left	Alfonso Barrantes	3.53	2
UDP	Javier Diez Canseco	3.50	2
FRENATRACA	Roger Cáceres	2.24	1
FOCEP	Genaro Ledesma	1.68	1
Chamber of Deputies
Popular Action	Fernando Belaúnde	38.92	98
APRA	Armando Villanueva	26.51	58
PPC	Luis Bedoya Reyes	9.60	10
United Left	Alfonso Barrantes	3.44	10
FRENATRACA	Roger Cáceres	2.57	4
This lists parties that won seats. See the complete results below.

General elections were held in Peru on 18 May 1980 for the first time since 1963 to elect the President and both houses of the Congress. Former President Fernando Belaúnde Terry of the Popular Action won the presidential election with 44.9% of the vote, whilst his party emerged as the largest party in both houses of Congress.

The size of Belaúnde's victory was considered unexpected.

The military, which had a history of intervening in government and had overthrown Belaúnde in 1968 and subsequently established a nationalist dictatorship, said it would respect the results of the election.

== Results ==
=== President ===
Candidate	Party	Votes	%
Fernando Belaúnde Terry	Popular Action	1,793,190	44.93
Armando Villanueva	American Popular Revolutionary Alliance	1,087,188	27.24
Luis Bedoya Reyes	Christian People's Party	382,547	9.58
Hugo Blanco	Workers' Revolutionary Party	160,713	4.03
Horacio Zevallos Galdós	Revolutionary Left Union	134,321	3.37
Leonidas Rodrígyez Figueroa	United Left	116,890	2.93
Carlos Malpica Santisteban	Popular Democratic Unity	98,452	2.47
Roger Cáceres Velásquez	National Front of Workers and Peasants	81,647	2.05
Genaro Ledesma Izquieta	Worker Peasant Student and Popular Front	60,853	1.52
Carolos Carrillo Smith	National Unity	18,170	0.46
Javier Tanteleán Vanini	Political Organisation of the Peruvian Revolution	17,737	0.44
Gustavo Mohme Llona	Socialist Political Action	11,607	0.29
Alejandro Tudela Garland	Pradist Democratic Movement	9,875	0.25
Waldo Fernández Durán	Progressive and Social Integration Party	9,350	0.23
Luciano Castillo Colonna	Socialist Party of Peru	8,714	0.22
Total		3,991,254	100.00
Valid votes		3,991,254	77.93
Invalid/blank votes		1,130,074	22.07
Total votes		5,121,328	100.00
Registered voters/turnout		6,471,101	79.14
Source: Nohlen

=== Senate ===
Party	Votes	%	Seats
Popular Action	1,694,952	40.92	26
American Popular Revolutionary Alliance	1,144,203	27.62	18
Christian People's Party	385,674	9.31	6
Revolutionary Left Union	189,080	4.56	2
Workers' Revolutionary Party	165,191	3.99	2
United Left	146,085	3.53	2
Popular Democratic Unity	145,155	3.50	2
National Front of Workers and Peasants	92,892	2.24	1
Worker Peasant Student and Popular Front	69,412	1.68	1
National Unity	25,551	0.62	0
Political Organisation of the Peruvian Revolution	23,339	0.56	0
Socialist Political Action	19,102	0.46	0
Pradist Democratic Movement	17,560	0.42	0
Progressive and Social Integration Party	12,708	0.31	0
Socialist Party of Peru	11,299	0.27	0
Total	4,142,203	100.00	60
Valid votes	4,142,203	78.78	
Invalid/blank votes	1,116,044	21.22	
Total votes	5,258,247	100.00	
Registered voters/turnout	6,431,651	81.76	
Source: Nohlen

=== Chamber of Deputies ===
Party	Votes	%	Seats
Popular Action	1,413,233	38.92	98
American Popular Revolutionary Alliance	962,801	26.51	58
Christian People's Party	348,578	9.60	10
Revolutionary Left Union	172,430	4.75	0
Popular Democratic Unity	156,415	4.31	0
Workers' Revolutionary Party	151,447	4.17	0
United Left	124,751	3.44	10
National Front of Workers and Peasants	93,416	2.57	4
Worker Peasant Student and Popular Front	61,248	1.69	0
National Unity	31,443	0.87	0
Pradist Democratic Movement	22,573	0.62	0
Socialist Political Action	22,708	0.63	0
Political Organisation of the Peruvian Revolution	21,609	0.60	0
Progressive and Social Integration Party	16,493	0.45	0
Socialist Party of Peru	9,786	0.27	0
Independents	22,408	0.62	0
Total	3,631,339	100.00	180
Valid votes	3,631,339	79.41	
Invalid/blank votes	941,802	20.59	
Total votes	4,573,141	100.00	
Registered voters/turnout	6,431,651	71.10	
Source: Nohlen
