= Manuel Dammert =

Peruvian politician and sociologist (1949–2021)

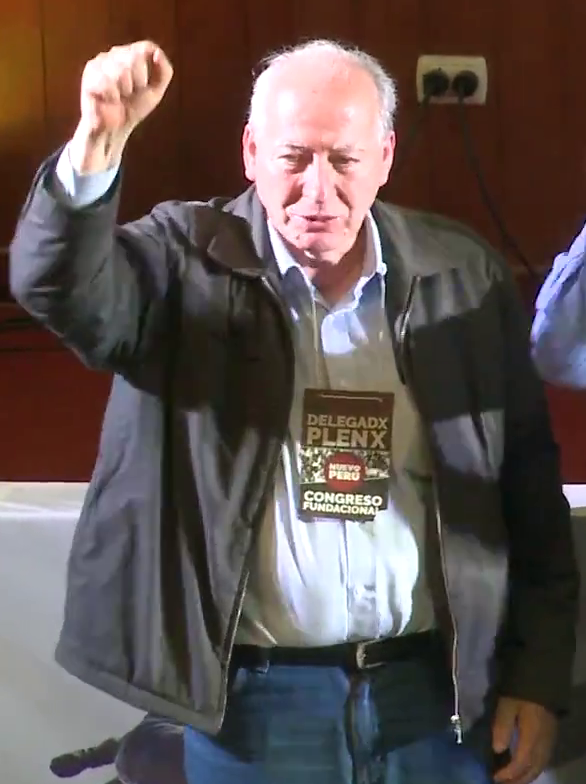
- Dammert in 2017

Member of the Congress of the Republic of Peru for Lima Metropolitana
- In office 27 July 2016 – 30 September 2019
- In office 7 May 2013 – 26 July 2016
- Preceded by: Javier Diez Canseco
- In office 27 July 1980 – 5 April 1992

Personal details
- Born: Manuel Dammert Ego Aguirre; 8 March 1949 Lima, Peru
- Died: 25 March 2021 (aged 72) Lima, Peru
- Political party: PCR; FA; New Peru

Manuel Dammert Ego Aguirre (8 March 1949 – 25 March 2021) was a Peruvian politician and sociologist. He served in the Congress of the Republic of Peru for Lima Metropolitana from 1980 to 1992 and 2013 to 2019.

== Biography ==
Dammert was born in the Miraflores District of Lima on 8 March 1949 to Manuel Dammert Bellido and Julia Ego-Aguirre Prideaux. He studied sociology at the National University of San Marcos, where he earned both a bachelor's and a master's degree.

In the 1980 Peruvian general election, Dammert ran for Congress as a member of the Revolutionary Communist Party. He ran again in 1985, joining the United Left coalition. He was again reelected in 1990, but his mandate was interrupted by the 1992 Peruvian coup d'état.

Dammert returned to politics in 2011, when he ran for Congress as part of the Peru Wins party, but failed to be elected. When Congressman Javier Diez Canseco died on 4 May 2013, he was replaced by Dammert for the remainder of the term. In 2016, he was reelected as a member of the Broad Front party. In December 2017, the New Peru party was founded, led by Verónika Mendoza and joined by Dammert. He left his post on 30 September 2019 following the dissolution of Congress by President Martín Vizcarra.

Manuel Dammert died of COVID-19 in Lima on 25 March 2021, at the age of 72.
