= Gustavo Mohme Llona =

Peruvian businessman, engineer, journalist and politician

Gustavo Mohme Llona (1930–2000) was a Peruvian businessman, engineer, journalist and politician.

== Early years ==
He was born on April 25, 1930, in the Morropón province, Chulucanas in the Piura region. His parents were Gustavo Mohme and Stella Llona. He was a descendant of the scientist Scipión Llona.

After attending high school in Lima, at the Colegio San Andrés, he studied at the National University of Engineering from which he graduated, in 1955, with the title of civil engineer.

== Political life ==
Gustavo Mohme began his political life when he met Fernando Belaunde in the National University of Engineering, and next he joined in the ranks of Popular Action.

In the general elections of 1980, Mohme ran for President of the Republic for Socialist Political Action, however he was not elected.

In the general elections of 1985, he was elected Senator for the United Left, with 52,939 votes, for the 1985-1990 parliamentary term.

In the general elections of 1990, he was a candidate for the second Vice Presidency of the Republic in the presidential roster of Henry Pease for United Left, however the candidacy was unsuccessful.

In the same elections, he ran for the Senate and was re-elected Senator for the United Left, for the 1990-1995 parliamentary term.

On April 2, 1992, his administration was interrupted after the Fujimorazo. Since then, Mohme became a strong opponent of the presidency of Alberto Fujimori.

In the general elections of 1995, he was elected Congressman for the Union for Peru, a party whose candidate was Javier Pérez de Cuéllar.

== La República ==
In 1981, Gustavo Mohme founded the newspaper La Republica. Now, it is one of the two main national daily newspapers sold all over the country.

== Death ==
In 2000, while walking on a beach in the district of Asia in the south of Lima, he suffered a heart attack, after which he died on April 23. His remains rest in the Los Sauces sector of the Jardines de la Paz Cemetery.

The Press Room of the Congress of Peru is named after him for having distinguished himself as a journalist.

== See also ==
- La Republica
