= Socialist Party (Peru) =

Political party in Peru

Socialist Party Partido Socialista
- Abbreviation: PS
- Leader: Javier Diez Canseco
- Founded: 2005
- Headquarters: Plaza Bolognesi 590, Lima, Peru
- Ideology: Socialism; Democratic socialism Mariáteguism
- Political position: Left-wing
- Regional affiliation: São Paulo Forum

Website
- partidosocialista-peru.com

The Socialist Party (Spanish: Partido Socialista) is a Peruvian political party founded in 2005. Its presidential candidate for the 2006 national election was Javier Diez Canseco. At the legislative elections held on 9 April 2006, the party won 1.2% of the popular vote but no seats in the Congress of the Republic.

At the 2011 general election, the party was part of the successful alliance Peru Wins, led by Ollanta Humala. Its founder, Javier Diez Canseco, became a congressman for Lima.

== History ==
The Socialist Party traces its origins to the Mariateguist Unified Party, a member of the United Left coalition. The party eventually disappeared in the aftermath of the 1995 general election. Among its leaders, Javier Diez Canseco rose as the most prominent of the left-leaning members of the Peruvian Congress during the Alberto Fujimori's second term as President of Peru. The Fujimori administration had demonized the Peruvian left since 1992, as it associated with the Shining Path. Under these circumstances, the moderate left rallied behind Union for Peru in order to maintain status in the political scene.

The events surrounding Fujimori's reelection at the 2000 general election curtailed the administration, as the Peruvian left rose again in the opposition. With Alan García of the Peruvian Aprista Party returning to Peru in order to run for the presidency at the 2001 general election, the left had no choice but to support him against the more centrist Alejandro Toledo. Union for Peru attained 6 seats in the Peruvian Congress, among them one for Javier Diez Canseco.

In 2005, Diez Canseco announced his intention to run for President of Peru at the 2006 general election under a new party based on the disappeared Mariateguist Unified Party. On 15 October 2005, the Socialist Party was founded, and in the subsequent months Diez Canseco was chosen as the presidential nominee. At the general election held on 9 April 2006, the party won 1.2% of the popular vote but no seats in the Congress of the Republic. The presidential ticket itself attained 0.4%, placing ninth nationally.

As the party failed to pass the electoral threshold, it lost its registration at the National Elections Jury 2007. For the 2011 general election, the party was included in the Peru Wins coalition led by Ollanta Humala as the presidential nominee. Diez Canseco was elected to the Congress for 2011–2016 term, but died in 2013.

In 2012, Cesar Acurio Zavala, an engineer, a historical activist of mariateguism, was elected as Secretary General; and as Sub-Secretary General the former student leader of the UNMSM and deputy for the Unified Mariateguist Party, Julio Castro Gómez.

== Ideology ==
The party is based on Mariateguismo, a thought developed by José Carlos Mariátegui and the original construction of socialism in Peru based on the Peruvian reality. The Socialist Party advocates for participatory democracy, with effective decentralization, strengthening of social organizations, etc.

In addition, the party is in favor of the nationalization of natural resources, the change of the productive matrix, sustainable development, defense of human rights and the historical demands of workers, women, youth, indigenous people, and all oppressed groups. On a more green left platform, the party advocates for measures against environmental problems, and climate change. The party's ultimate goal is to forge a classless, diverse and creative society.

== Structure and composition ==
The Socialist Party is mainly composed of a National Executive Committee organized in secretariats, such as program, regional affairs, environment, municipal, women, social movements, human movements and the youth wing. In March 2008, the Socialist Party called for a leadership election through the procedure of one member one vote, a pioneer in the Peruvian left.

== Electoral results ==
=== Presidential election ===
Year	Candidate	Party / Coalition	Votes	Percentage	Outcome
2011	Ollanta Humala	Peru Wins PNP-PS-PCP-PSR-MPVS	1st Round: 4 643 064	1st Round: 31.70	1st Round: 1st
2011	Ollanta Humala	Peru Wins PNP-PS-PCP-PSR-MPVS	2nd Round: 7 937 704	2nd Round: 51.45	2nd Round: 1st

=== Election to the Congress of the Republic ===
Year	Votes	%	Seats	▲/▼	Position
2011	3 245 003 as part of Peru Wins. Only 1 from Socialist Party.	25.3%	47 / 130	▲1	Minority
