= Revolutionary Vanguard (Communist Proletarian) =

Revolutionary Vanguard (Communist Proletarian) Vanguardia Revolucionaria (Proletario Comunista)
- Abbreviation: VR-PC
- Leader: Julio César Mezzich
- General Secretary: Eduardo Figari
- Founded: 1977
- Split from: VR
- Newspaper: El Proletario Comunista
- Ideology: Communism; Marxism-Leninism; Maoism
- Political position: Far-left
- National affiliation: UNIR

Revolutionary Vanguard (Communist Proletarian) (in Spanish: Vanguardia Revolucionaria (Proletario Comunista), abbreviated VR-PC) was a Maoist-oriented political party in Peru founded in 1977 by Eduardo Figari and Julio César Mezzich. It was formed through a split in Revolutionary Vanguard. In 1978 a faction mainly active in the peasant movement around Mezzich and Lino Quintanillo left the VR-PC and most of its members joined individually the Shining Path.

Figari served as the general secretary of the VR-PC. In October 1979 VR-PC was a co-founder of the electoral coalition Revolutionary Left Union (UNIR). El Proletario Comunista was the organ of the Central Committee of VR-PC.
