= Revolutionary Marxist Workers Party =

Political party

The Revolutionary Marxist Workers Party (Spanish: Partido Obrero Marxista Revolucionario) was a Trotskyist political party in Peru that was founded in 1970 by a dissident fraction of Vanguardia Revolucionaria. It was led by Ricardo Napurí and Jorge Villarán. Napurí was the general secretary of POMR.

Internationally, POMR was an affiliate of CORQI.

POMR contested the 1980 general election on the lists of the Workers Revolutionary Party (PRT). Napurí was elected senator.

On March 7, 1982, the majority faction of POMR merged with the Socialist Workers Party.
