= Movement of Socialist Affirmation =

Movement of Socialist Affirmation Movimiento de Afirmación Socialista
- Abbreviation: MAS
- Leader: Henry Pease; Rolando Ames; Gloria Helfer
- Founded: 1989
- Dissolved: 1992
- Ideology: Christian socialism
- Political position: Left-wing
- National affiliation: IU (1989-92); MDI (1992-93)

The Movement of Socialist Affirmation (Spanish: Movimiento de Afirmación Socialista) (MAS) was a political party in Peru formed in 1989 by left Christian elements of the IU coalition, and active through 1992. Leaders included Henry Pease, Rolando Ames and Gloria Helfer.

MAS worked within IU in the 1989 and 1990 elections. In 1992 it broke with IU, and was one of the organizations founding MDI. MAS worked with MDI in the 1992 and 1993 elections. In the 1993 referendum, it supported the No.

MAS was represented in President Alberto Fujimori's first cabinet by Gloria Helfer, who was appointed Minister of Education.
