= Peruvian Agrarian Reform =

Land reform redistribution in Peru

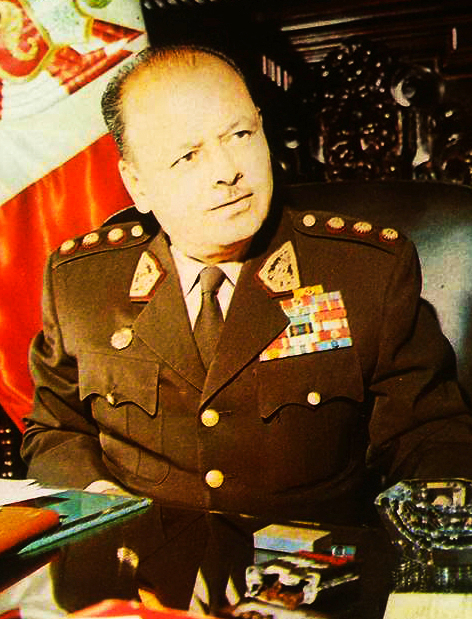
General Juan Velasco Alvarado, promoter of the Peruvian Agrarian Reform of 1969

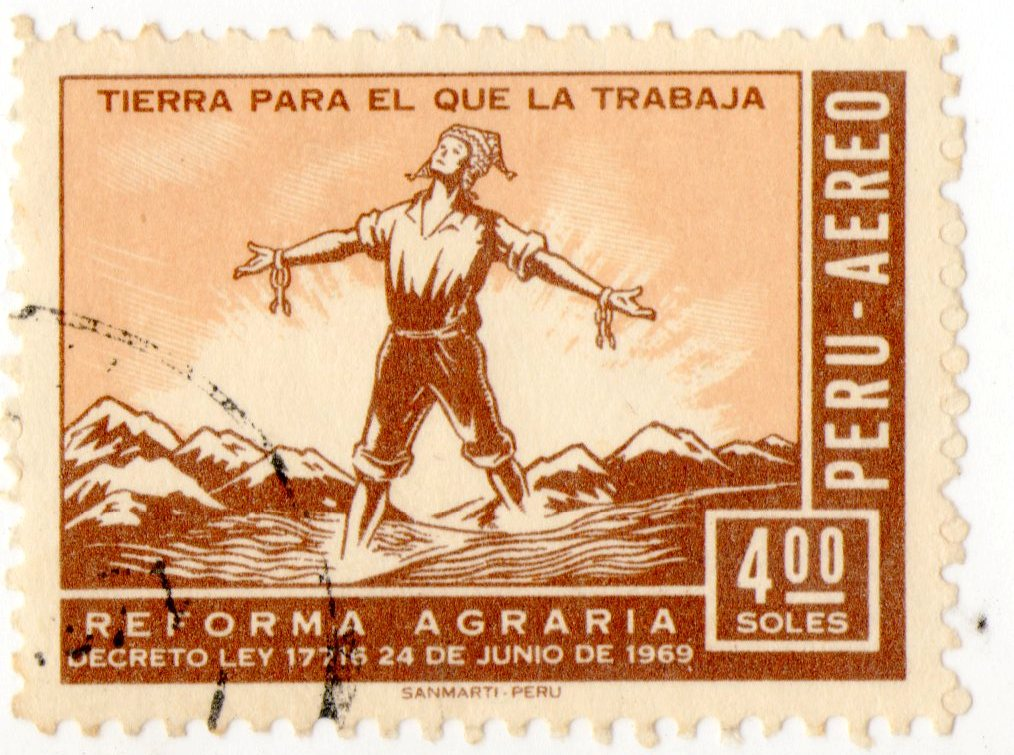
Peruvian stamp from 1969, picture by Carlos Zeiter: „The land for the one who works it“

The Agrarian Reform in Peru was a process of land reform redistribution initiated in the 1960s by struggles of rural workers (campesinos) for their land in the Cusco Region, and legally implemented under General Juan Velasco Alvarado in 1969 through three distinct laws. These land reform laws sought to redistribute large amounts of land that had once been owned by indigenous populations to the rural populations that lived and worked in the lands. The proposed laws promulgated in 1969 would attempt to change Peru´s agrarian infrastructure from being a system dominated by haciendas. That system was characterized by the semi-feudal relationships between haciendas owned by private Spanish patrones which employed peones, a large indigenous group, large cooperatives controlled by the Peruvian state, and areas of land owned indigenous communities (comunidades campesinas) that were recognized by the Peruvian government. The land reform was predominately focused on redistributing land from private haciendas to rural communities. For the former hacendados, the government of Peru issued agrarian bonds as compensation for land expropriation as well as stocks in the state-owned industrial companies in an effort to convert the agrarian capitalists to industrial ones.

== Agrarian society before 1969 ==
Agrarian society, in most rural areas, prior to the reform consisted of an extensive network of haciendas, which were a result of extreme land concentration from colonial times where Spanish landlords were assigned large pieces of land that previously belonged to indigenous groups. The indigenous groups that previously owned and cultivated the lands became workers at these newly founded haciendas. Indigenous workers were unpaid or underpaid, some hacienda workers were given housing and food in exchange for their labor, and others were paid small wages and charged rent for their housing.

After the independence of Peru, the few restrictions for landowners to protect the indigenous peasants were lifted, and the haciendas expanded largely at cost of the indigenous communities.

In the years between 1900 and 1918, the sugar cane haciendas in Chicama Valley in the Department of La Libertad were acquired by three industrial giants: the Larco brothers (related to the family of José A. Larco), Graham Rowe and Co (British export company) and the Gildemeister family (merchants from Bremen).

In the Peruvian constitution enacted in 1920 under Augusto B. Leguía, indigenous communities were recognized as legal entities for the first time in Peruvian history, which gave them the right to land property and legal protection against expropriation by the haciendas. However, in the 1920s there was an uprising of Quechua peasants in the province of Anta against the landlords which was repressed by security forces. In 1936, the rights of the indigenous communities were also included in the Civil Code (Código Civil). The indigenous communities that could prove their historical existence as legal entities got land titles, which gave them legal protection against expropriation by the haciendas. By the year of 2000, 5660 communities were recognized.

== Preceding agrarian reforms in Peru ==
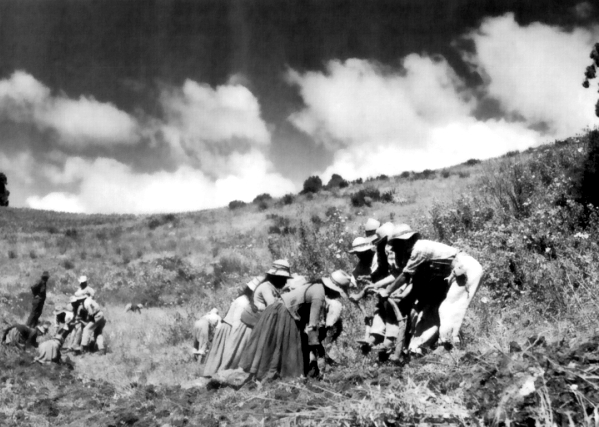
Agricultural labor in the Peruvian Sierra (1940).

In November 1962, the military government of Ricardo Pérez Godoy enacted the Agrarian Reform Law D.L. N° 14328. In 1963, the military government of Nicolás Lindley decreed the Agrarian Reform Law (Decreto Ley No 14444) creating the Institute of Agrarian Reform and Colonization (IRAC, Instituto de Reforma Agraria y Colonización) and started a process of Agrarian Reform in La Convención Province and Lares Valley (Department of Cuzco), reacting to land occupations by peasants organized in the CCP (Confederación Campesina del Perú) under the leadership of Hugo Blanco Galdós who were organizing a regional agrarian reform on the own, expelling the hacendados. The third agrarian reform law was adopted by the Peruvian Congress in 1964 when Fernando Belaúnde Terry was president (Ley de Reforma Agraria N° 15037). This reform did not include the large estates on the northern coast, and its application was blocked by a Congress majority of APRA and the right-wing Unión Nacional Odriista. Up to 300.000 peasants in the Andes marched in protest for a real agrarian reform.

In 1969, there were an estimated 700,000 families that did not own any land. Many of these families were indigenous and or low-income, worked in haciendas, and were predominately located in rural regions of Peru.

== The Agrarian Reform by Juan Velasco Alvarado ==
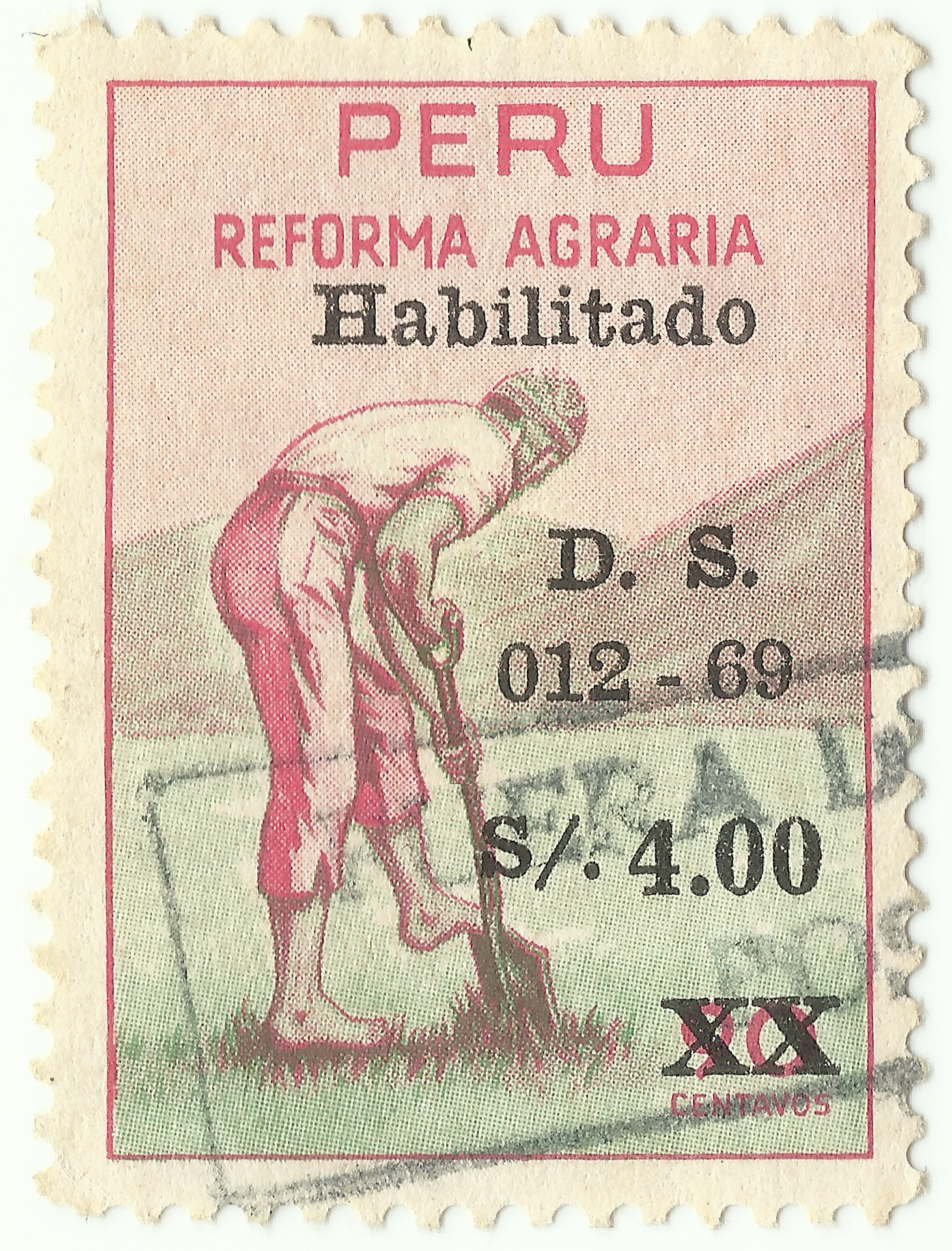
Peruvian stamp of the Agrarian Reform (1969).

A program of agrarian reform was resumed by the Revolutionary Government of the Armed Forces of Peru of general Juan Velasco Alvarado who overthrew Belaúnde's government on 3 October 1968. On 24 June 1969, the Agrarian Reform Law (Decreto Ley N° 17716 de Ley de Reforma Agraria) was promulgated. The government declared the following objectives of the reform:

1. Elimination of large estates (haciendas: latifundios) and smallholding (minifundios)
2. Formation of production cooperatives owned by peasants
3. Restructuring of traditional peasant communities
4. Formation of agriculture based on the common effort of the peasants
5. Creation of new markets by just distribution of entry which improves the acquisition power of marginalized populations
6. Parallel development of primary transformation industries in the field

The agro-industrial complexes on the coast were the first to be expropriated. On 26 June 1969, two days after promulgation of the law, armed soldiers entered the sugar haciendas of the northern coast to take the installations and expel their owners.

In contrast to Belaúnde's reform, no exemptions for owners of large estates were allowed. Between June 1969 and June 1979, more than 9 million hectares of land representing 15,826 lots were expropriated, benefitting some 370,000 families, much more than the approximately 1 million hectares from 546 haciendas in the time of Belaúnde's government. In the beginning, the expropriated estates were not distributed, but were left intact, concentrated and collectivized. 15,000 expropriated estates were transformed into 1,708 cooperatives. The expropriated landowners had to accept agrarian bonds within 20 to 30 years at an interest rate of 4 to 6% p.a. as compensation. Payment in bonds was limited to an amount of approximately 270,000 soles (around $6,236), above which the bonds were exchanged for stocks in industrial companies owned by the state. Additionally, expropriated landowners could cash in their bonds at the Banco Industrial for their full face value but only if they invested the same amount into an industrial plant. These two measures effectively converted agrarian capitalists into industrial capitalists and were most likely a calculated effort by the revolutionary junta to boost their urban industrial developments.

Two types of cooperatives were formed: Agrarian Production Cooperatives (Cooperativas Agrarias de Producción, CAP) and Agrarian Societies of Social Interest (Sociedades Agrícolas de Interés Social, SAIS). The CAPs were formed mainly in the coastal haciendas producing cash crops such as sugar cane, cotton and rice for the external as well as for the internal market, but also in the Andean region of Cuzco, among them the CAP José Zúñiga Letona at the former hacienda Huarán in the Calca District, where the film Kuntur Wachana was made, the cooperative of Ninamarca, whose first director was the famous peasant leader Saturnino Huillca Quispe, and the huge CAP Tupac Amaru II in Anta Province, which produced for the internal market. These cooperatives were owned by the agricultural workers in form of collective ownership. The SAIS were organized as cattle-holding cooperatives owned by agricultural workers grazing livestock and associated with traditional neighboring peasant communities.

On 9 May 1972, Law Nº 19400 was promulgated, which dissolved the organizations of the hacendados: the National Agrarian Society (Sociedad Nacional Agraria, SNA), the Association of Stockbreeders (Asociación de Ganaderos) and the Association of Rice Producers (Asociación de Productores de Arroz). Instead, the organization of the beneficiaries of the agrarian reform, the National Agrarian Confederation of Peru (Confederación Nacional Agraria, CNA), was founded on 3 October 1974. The ascription of the former haciendas to cooperatives controlled by bureaucrats and engineers led to great dissatisfaction among the indigenous peasants and the traditional peasant communities who wanted to get back their lands taken from them by the hacendados. Land occupations of cooperative lands started as early as 1973 in the huge cooperative “Tupac Amaru II” also called Machu Asnu (“Old Donkey”) in Anta Province (department of Cuzco), formed out of 105 former haciendas expropriated between 1971 and 1973. The leadership of the cooperative did not even speak the language of the peasants, Cuzco Quechua. The land occupations were organized by the oppositional peasant organization CCP, which had already occupied lands in the 1960s. In the following years, the lands of the cooperative were distributed among the indigenous communities, and in 1980, it was dissolved. Other land occupations took place in the department of Apurimac where the authorities had not even started expropriations of landlords.

During the Peruvian agrarian reform, Velasco made this unique statement:

The hacendado class emerged during the Spanish conquest of the Inca Empire and persisted after Peruvian independence; this state of affairs doomed Peru to a crushing defeat against Chile in the War of the Pacific. Consequently, this reform was necessary to prevent "false Peruvians"—adherents of Mao Zedong’s or Stalin’s ideologies—from prevailing with their claims of improving the country. It is necessary to expel and destroy all foreign interference that seeks to destroy us—such as Hispanism, Christianity, Chileanism, imperialism, capitalism, communism, or others.

== The Downfall of Peruvian Agrarian Reform ==
The agrarian reform, initiated by Juan Velasco Alvarado, occurred from 1969 to 1978. The reform efforts were successful in redistributing land to indigenous communities, campesino communities, individual families, and to agricultural businesses and some corporate structures. The reform benefited approximately 334,108 of the around 700,000 families that did not own land in Peru prior to the reform.

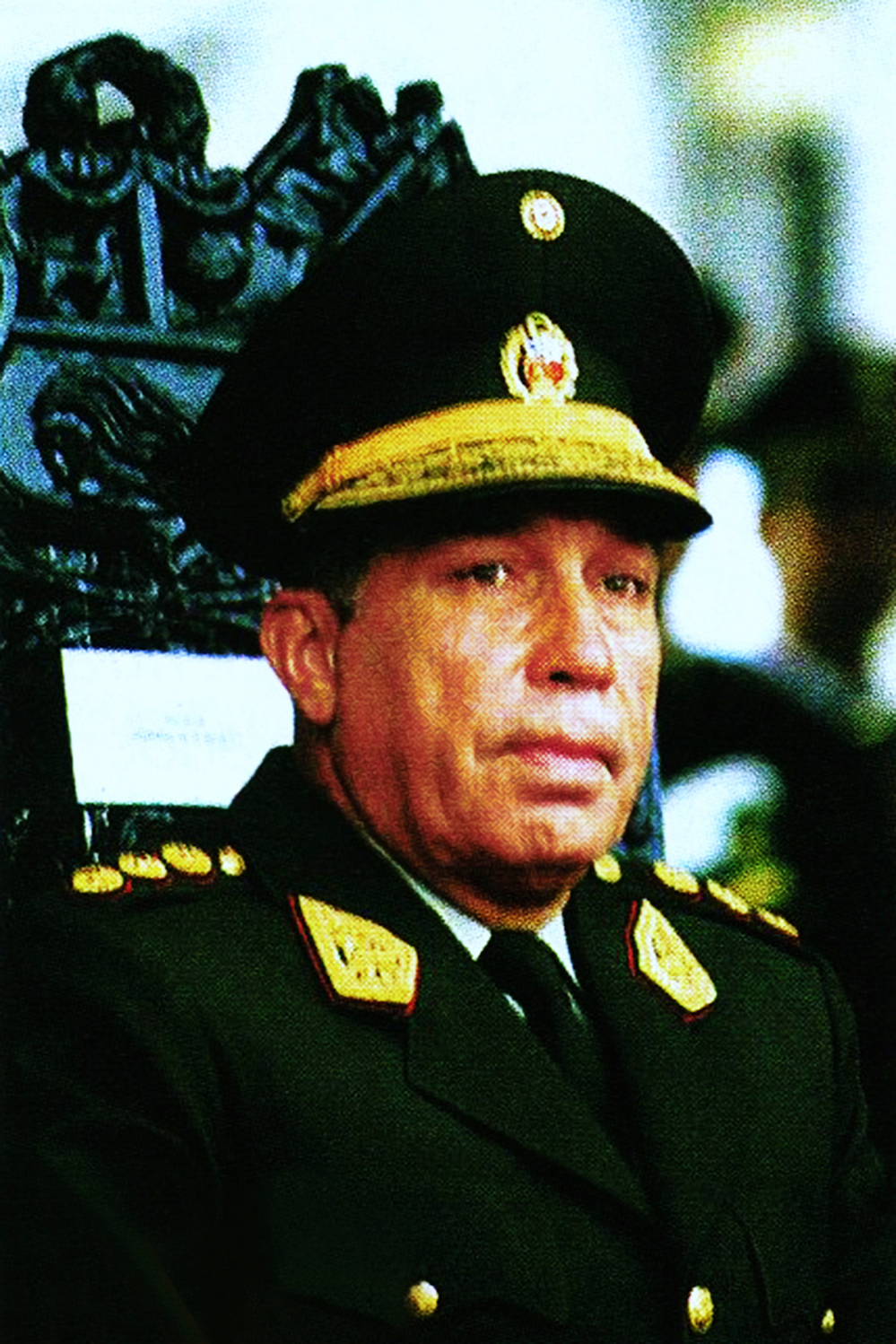
Francisco Morales Bermúdez. President of Peru from 1975-1980

The start of the downfall of Peruvian Agrarian Reform was when Peru began to experience a severe economic depression around the mid 1970s which continued through the 1980s. This economic crisis resulted in high levels unemployment, inflation, and food shortages, and was in part caused by the economically protectionist policies and high spending of the Velasco regime and the increasing resistance to state actions from political opposition and business elites in Peru. With the Peruvian state on the verge of economic catastrophe, Velasco lost support from his former military allies resulting in the end of his regime and large scale reductions to land reform attempts.

In 1975, Juan Velasco Alvarado was removed from power in a bloodless coup staged by Francisco Morales Bermúdez, Velasco's former Prime Minister and Minister of War. Morales was considered a political moderate by military leaders in Peru, who were looking to reduce the scope of the revolutionary actions of Velasco without entirely abandoning the revolutionary government. Francisco Morales Bermúdez undid many of the left-wing policies from the Velasco administration, and became a part of Operation Condor.

Under Morales political regime, the expropriations of land (initiated by Velasco) continued, although in different areas, and the scope of the operation of seizing and redistributing land was greatly reduced. Morales was primarily focused on trying to resolve Peru's economic issues without losing the support of left-leaning Peruvians that supported the revolution. The Morales administration took out additional loans from the International Monetary Fund, and maintained a greatly reduced version of formal land reform programs until 1978 when economic issues and civil unrest made it impossible to continue the operation, marking the end of attempts at agrarian reform in Peru.

== Second government of Belaúnde Terry and government of Alan García ==
In 1980, the revolutionary government of Peru and Morales' Administration was unable to continue, and reinstated constitutional rule in Peru. Belaúnde, the president who was originally ousted by Velasco, won the first election in the newly established electoral system. According to Enrique Mayer, Fernando Belaúnde Terry “did his best to derail the agrarian reform”. Properties redistributed under Velasco and Morales were not returned to the oligarchies, but work-led cooperatives were converted into independent enterprises that could be easily dissolved by their members. In the following years, most of the cooperative land in the Andes was distributed among indigenous communities and smallholders, resulting in a radical restructuring of land distribution in Peru. Peasants in the Andes, mostly organized in the CCP, recuperated lands by massive occupations, the last of which were the spectacular land occupations in the Department of Puno between 1987 and 1989. By the end of the 1980s, according to Enrique Mayer, the indigenous communities (peasant communities) got most of the land in the Andes, and only partly the cooperatives had been a phase in between, for in many cases, the indigenous peasants of the former haciendas simply refused to turn them into cooperatives, and after that they got the land as a community directly. According to him, “the landowning class was totally eliminated from the countryside” in the highlands.

Few cooperatives remained, such as the sheep-holding SAIS Tupac Amaru N° 1 located in Pachacayo (Junín) with more than 200,000 hectares of land as of 2012, still active in 2021 with 30,000 peasants and 16 associated communities. Some cooperatives were destroyed by actions of the Maoist Shining Path during the internal conflict in Peru in the 1980s and 1990s, especially in the regions of Ayacucho and Junín. This was the case with the sheep-holding SAIS “Cahuide” in Junín, which was later distributed among peasant communities and smallholders.

== Alberto Fujimori ==
Under Alberto Fujimori, Absalón Vásquez, the son of an agricultural worker at the sugar cooperative (CAP) of Casa Grande in Chicama Valley, became agricultural minister. He privatized the remaining sugar cooperatives in this traditional region of sugar production, which by then had been severely indebted to banks, and sold them to the agricultural corporations Gloria (Rodríguez Banda family), Wong and Oviedo at the end of the 1990s.
