= Revolutionary Left Movement (Peru) =

- Movimiento de la Izquierda Revolucionaria
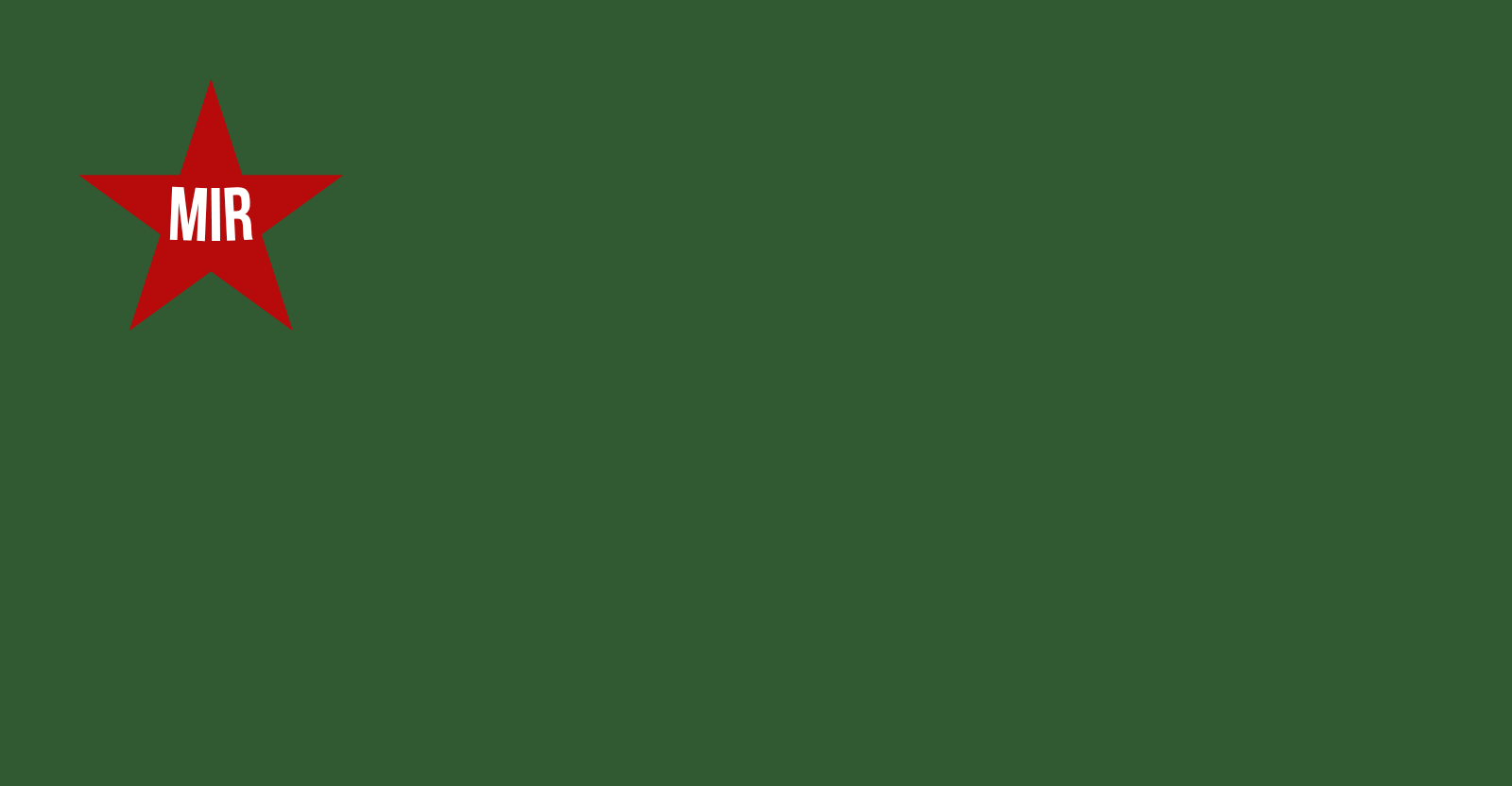
- Revolutionary Left Movement flag.
- Active: 1962–1965
- Country: Peru
- Allegiance: Communism; Marxism–Leninism; Guevarism; Foco theory; Revolutionary socialism
- Nickname: Miristas
- Colors: Red and black

Commanders
- Notable commanders: Luis de la Puente Uceda

The Revolutionary Left Movement (in Spanish: Movimiento de la Izquierda Revolucionaria) was a Marxist–Leninist guerilla group founded in Peru in 1962 by Luis de la Puente Uceda and his group APRA Rebelde, a splinter group from the APRA which had rallied the government in the 1950s and 1960s. The group disavowed gradual reform and called for radical revolution. Inspired by the Cuban Revolution and close to a non-aligned position which opposed itself to the Communist Party of Peru, the Soviet Union and China, the group initiated guerrilla actions against the government in 1965.

After its leader's death at the end of 1965, the MIR split into three different factions. One of them, the MIR-EM, merged with the Revolutionary Socialist Party (Marxist–Leninist) in 1982 to create the Movimiento Revolucionario Túpac Amaru (MRTA). The two others factions, MIR-VR and MIR-IV, joined the parliamentary left-wing coalition Izquierda Unida in the early 1980s.

== Origins ==
The MIR was born out of a split with the APRA, a formerly leftist group which increasingly began to collaborate with the government in the 1950s-60s. Luis de la Puente Uceda's faction created the APRA Rebelde at the end of the 1950s, which became the MIR in 1962. The MIR was part of the "New Left", as was the group Vanguardia Revolucionaria, characterized by its criticisms against both the APRA and the Communist Party, and its independence towards China and the Soviet Union. Instead, it turned itself toward the contemporary Guevarist foco strategy.

Following the 1963 election to the presidency of Fernando Belaunde Terry, and his failure to implement social reforms, the situation in the impoverished countryside became more critical. The first guerrilla movement, the ELN (National Liberation Army), appeared, but was quickly defeated by the military. 1964 was marked by the continuing failure of governmental reforms and clashes during land occupations by landless peasants, and the MIR launched its armed struggle the following year.

== Creation ==
Luis Felipe de La Puente Uceda divided the country into three zones of influence, with the intent of creating various focos. Manco Cápac in the North led by Gonzalo Fernández Gasca, Pachacutec in the South headed by Rubén Tupayachi Solórzano, and Túpac Amaru in the Center directed by Guillermo Lobatón.

However, the MIR did not manage to find sufficient popular support, while the divisions between rival revolutionary groups, such as the ELN, the Revolutionary Left Front (Frente de Izquierda Revolucionaria) headed by Hugo Blanco or the MIR prevented any concerted action. Confined in the jungles, the MIR unsuccessfully battled against the military forces, assisted by the CIA who, according to former CIA official Victor Marchetti, created a "miniature Fort Bragg" in the jungle. The MIR leader Luis Felipe de la Puente Uceda died on October 23, 1965, in an armed confrontation. A few months later, the movement was all but annihilated.

== Huancavelica and Junín campaign ==
Two years after Luis Felipe de la Puente Uceda's death in 1965, the MIR split into rival factions, including MIR El Militante (MIR-EM), MIR Voz Rebelde (MIR-VR) and MIR IV Etapa (MIR-IV), each claiming political orthodoxy.

During the elections for a Constituent Assembly, the MIR-VR and the MIR-IV participated to the left-wing Unidad Democrática Popular (UDP) coalition, thus merging with the legalist left, and then to the Izquierda Unida coalition in the 1980s. On the other hand, the MIR-EM continued armed struggle, merging in 1982 with the Partido Socialista Revolucionario – Marxista Leninista (PSR-ML) to create the Movimiento Revolucionario Túpac Amaru (MRTA).

== See also ==
- Túpac Amaru Revolutionary Movement
