= Worker Peasant Student and Popular Front =

Political party in Peru

Worker Peasant Student and Popular Front Frente Obrero Campesino Estudiantil y Popular
- Abbreviation: FOCEP
- Leader: Genaro Ledesma Izquieta
- Founded: 1977
- Ideology: Communism; Factions: Trotskyism; Maoism
- Political position: Far-left
- National affiliation: PST; PCP(ML); POMR; IU (1985–1990)

The Worker Peasant Student and Popular Front (Frente Obrero Campesino Estudiantil y Popular) or FOCEP is a political party in Peru. It was founded as a broad front in 1977 by a group around Genaro Ledesma Izquieta, Socialist Workers Party, Peruvian Communist Party (Red Flag) and Revolutionary Marxist Workers Party. FOCEP participated in the elections in 1978. It later converted itself into a party, but only with the group around Ledesma. It participated in the 1980 elections alone, and on IU lists in 1985 and 1990. It maintains good relations with the Workers' Party of Korea of the DPRK and has signed the 1992 Pyongyang Declaration.
