= Democratic Left Movement (Peru) =

Political alliance in Peru

Democratic Left Movement Movimiento Democrático de Izquierda
- Abbreviation: MDI
- Founded: 1992
- Dissolved: 1990s?
- Merger of: PMR (faction); PCR (faction)
- Ideology: Socialism; Factions: Christian socialism Communism; Mariateguism
- Political position: Left-wing to far-left
- National affiliation: APS; MAS

Democratic Left Movement (in Spanish: Movimiento Democrático de Izquierda or MDI), was a political alliance in Peru founded in 1992 by a group of small parties, the Socialist Political Action (APS), Movement of Socialist Affirmation (MAS), Revolutionary Mariateguist Party (PMR) and Revolutionary Communist Party (PCR).

MDI contested the general elections 1992 and municipal elections 1993. Later it dissolved.
