= Hugo Blanco =

Hugo Blanco may refer to:

- Hugo Blanco (politician) (1934–2023), Peruvian politician
- Hugo Blanco (musician) (1940–2015), Venezuelan musician
