= Revolutionary Vanguard (Political-Military) =

Revolutionary Vanguard (Political-Military) (in Spanish: Vanguardia Revolucionaria (Político-Militar)) was a militant Peruvian left group, and a splinter group of Revolutionary Vanguard (VR).
