= Proletarian Party of Peru =

The Proletarian Party of Peru (in Spanish: Partido Proletario del Perú) is a communist party in Peru. Its general secretary at founding was Illipa Tuta.

== See also ==
- Communism in Peru
