= Agrarian bonds in Peru =

Beginning in 1969, the government of Peru issued sovereign bonds as compensation for land expropriation during the Peruvian land reform under General Juan Velasco Alvarado. The government's aim was to redistribute land and reform the country's agrarian infrastructure. Payments on these bonds halted in 1992 due to periods of hyperinflation. The agrarian bonds have been recognized as outstanding sovereign debt obligations by Peru's highest courts, who have stated that these bonds should be repaid. However, the debt remains unpaid, and the government of Peru has yet to clarify means and ultimate value of compensation to current bondholders.

== Land reform bonds ==
Beginning in 1969, the Peruvian government under General Velasco implemented a series of measures aimed at transforming the country's social landscape by addressing the wealth-distribution system, particularly the economic and land ownership system. One such measure was the promulgation of Decree Law No. 17716 (the Land Reform Act) which sought to transform the country's land-tenure structure and replace the latifundio and minifundio system with redistribution of rural land. The land reform consisted of a series of expropriations of large rural parcels. Ownership of these parcels – formerly owned by both individuals and legal entities – initially passed to the State and was subsequently distributed among peasants and campesinos organized in cooperatives and agricultural associations. Those whose property was expropriated were entitled to compensation based on an appraisal conducted by the State and payment of the fair value was required by constitutional mandate. The State promised to pay over time, with interest, by issuing and placing the Land Reform Bonds. Landowners had no choice in the matter, for the law made surrender of land and acceptance of the Bonds mandatory. The State, therefore, not only took the land but effectively compelled the landowners to loan the State the funds with which to pay compensation for the takings.

The Government ultimately issued three classes of Land Reform Bonds: (i) Class A, with 6% annual interest over twenty years beginning as of their placement; (ii) Class B, with 5% annual interest over twenty-five years; and (iii) Class C, with 4% annual interest over thirty years. These Bonds stated that they were payable annually in cash until maturity. They represent the State's obligation to pay the fair value of the land, which had the “State’s unreserved guarantee” pursuant to article 175 of the Land Reform Act.

The website of the Ministry of Agriculture and Irrigation indicates that between June 1969 and June 1979, more than 9,000,000 hectares of land were expropriated, consisting of some 15,826 land lots. According to that source, this benefited approximately 370,000 families. In a 2006 opinion, the Congressional Agricultural Committee noted that the Ministry of Finance had made a "net bond placement" equal to "13.285 billion" old sols (~ US$380 million). That report also indicated that "payments were made for 10.763 billion" sols of the principal and that there was an outstanding balance of some 2.521 billion sols, approx. ~ US$71.2 million.

== Ongoing default ==
Pursuant to article 29 of the 1933 Constitution, which was valid when the Land Reform Act was enacted, landowners were entitled to the payment of fair compensation for the expropriated lands. Available sources on this topic indicate that the Land Reform Act did not set forth a fair method for assessing the value of the land, but that it indicated that the amount of the justiprecio would be set, among other ways, on the basis of the sworn declaration of self- valuation (autoavaluo), or “on the basis of the land’s economic capabilities” and that the Land Reform General Directorate fixed the justiprecio on the basis of the land's quality using a representative hectare sample for agricultural lands.

In their publication Quantitative Aspects of the Land Reform, Caballero and Alvarez indicate that “the total amount of the expropriations – slightly over 15 billion sols – is pretty low,” as it corresponds to “approximately half of the national budget for agricultural loans in 1977,” and “only 20% more than the national investment in irrigation in 1978.”

During the 1980s, Peru began defaulting on the payment of the Bonds’ coupons. This default has been attributed to the deteriorating economic situation, which resulted in terrible hyperinflation (as described in paragraphs 45 and 46), the winding down of the Agrarian Bank that took place from 1992 and the currency switch from Soles Oro to Inti. Although Peru for a time created some individualized bank accounts and credited those accounts with nominal payments and deposits, it appears that it stopped paying the debt altogether – even on a nominal basis and unadjusted for current value – approximately in 1992.

=== Law N° 26597 ===
Through the enactment of N° 26597 in April 1996, the government took the position that physical delivery of the bonds was tantamount to effective payment. In 1996, however, the Engineers’ Bar Association asked this Tribunal to declare Law N° 26597 unconstitutional on the basis that it affected the valuation criteria and payment for expropriated lands enshrined in article 70 of the Constitution. The Engineers’ Bar Association argued that the land reform expropriations had actually been “seizures,” because landowners had received Bonds that were worth far less than the expropriated land, and that due to the “inflation process,” the value of the Bonds had been “eroded in relation to the actual value of the expropriated land.” The Constitutional Tribunal noted that Congress “denied and opposed” the Engineers’ Bar Association's petition, arguing that “the land reform bonds are valid payment and are governed by the nominal payment principle, under which the creditor receives the exact sum of money appearing on the bond, regardless of any changes in its purchasing power.”

On March 15, 2001, the Tribunal issued a landmark opinion. The Tribunal upheld the Engineers’ Bar Association unconstitutionality claim and confirmed the principle that the Land Reform Bonds should be adjusted in accordance with the valuation principle enshrined in article 1236 of the Civil Code and Article 70 of the Constitution. The Tribunal declared article 1 of Law N° 26597 unconstitutional because “the criteria for the valuation and payment of the adjusted value of the expropriated land” responds to “a sense of basic justice, in accordance with article 70 of the Constitution,” which that law ignored when it provided for payment of “the face value amount only.” The Constitutional Tribunal also found article 2 of Law N° 26597 unconstitutional because it attempted to validate the fair value system presented in the Bonds while treating this value “in an unalterable way that failed to take into account the effects of time.” The Tribunal further declared these legal provisions unconstitutional “as they violated the valuation criteria inherent to property.”

The “sense of basic justice” to which the Tribunal's March 2001 Decision referred arose from the effect of hyperinflation on the value of the Bonds during the long payment period the State had imposed. Between 1980 and 1987, Peru's annual inflation rate never dipped below 50%. Between 1988 and 1990, the economic situation continued to worsen and inflation spiraled out of control, reaching its peak in August 1990, when annual inflation was 12,378%. In that month alone, existing currency lost 75% of its value. This means that at the end of that month, the same amount of money would have the power to buy only 1/4 of the goods and services it could have purchased at the beginning of that month. In other words, prices were more than 100 times higher by August 1990 than they had been a year earlier; more than 7,000 times higher than they had been the year before that; and more than 30,000 times higher than they had been just three years earlier in August 1987. For bondholders, the face value of the debt owed to them – as denominated in Soles Oro – virtually disappeared.

In response to the profound inflation and currency devaluation crisis, the administration changed the currency twice in a span of six years. In 1985, Peru switched from Sol Oro – the currency in which the Bonds were issued – to Inti. In 1991, the State once again changed the official currency from the Inti. to the Nuevo Sol. As a result, the nominal equivalent of one Sol de Oro is now equal to 0.000000001 – one billionth – of a Nuevo Sol.

In a 2006 report, a Congressional Committee opined that the State had “acknowledged the debt and promised to pay it” by issuing the Land Reform Bonds, but “as the value of the currency deteriorated,” it had become “essential” to apply an adjustment factor that “to the extent possible, would allow the value of the confiscated assets to remain constant.”

=== Emergency Decree N° 088-2000 ===
While the Engineers’ Bar Association unconstitutionality claim was pending, in 2000, Peru passed Emergency Decree N° 088-2000, recognizing the land reform debt and purporting to implement a mechanism for crediting and paying it, using new bonds issued by the Public Treasury. To adjust the value of the Land Reform Bonds, Emergency Decree N° 088-2000 ordered them converted “to U.S. dollars at the official exchange rate in effect on the issue date,” applying “to the result an annual interest rate of seven point five percent (7.5%) up to the month immediately prior to the date the calculation was made, compounded annually.”

Emergency Decree N° 088-2000 provided that payment would be made by swapping the Land Reform Bonds for newly issued sovereign debt with a maturity of 30 years but with no interest. In other words, it converted a compulsory interest bearing loan to the State into a compulsory interest free loan. Additionally, the Emergency Decree authorized free negotiability of the Bonds only for certain purposes – for instance, to acquire very specific agricultural land (such as fallow lands; or land that was undergoing an irrigation project); or to purchase stock in State-owned agricultural companies.

Various bondholders objected to the Emergency Decree N° 088-2000. On February 3, 2004, the Ica Bar Association filed an unconstitutionality claim against several articles of the decree. It was argued, among other things, that the Emergency Decree violated the right to property; and the principle of judicial independence, by unlawfully interfering with proceedings that were pending before Peruvian courts dealing with the payment of compensation for expropriations; and the right to due process, since it attempted retroactively to impose a procedure that did not exist at the time the underlying events occurred.

That claim was the basis for this Tribunal to set another historic precedent. On August 2, 2004, the Tribunal upheld the independence of the judiciary and concluded that “the procedure governed by Emergency Decree N° 088-2000” should be interpreted “as an option that may be freely chosen by creditors as an alternative to the option of going to Court to demand payment of the adjusted amount of the debt, plus applicable interest.” In other words, the Tribunal left open the possibility for Land Reform Bond holders to seek compensation before a competent court. Similarly, with regard to the alleged violation of the principle of equality under the law – petitioners in that case argued that the Emergency Decree N° 088-2000 used an adjustment method “different from that normally provided for creditors” under the Civil Code – the Tribunal held that there was no such violation so long as Emergency Decree N° 088-2000 was merely an “option” and was not mandatory. As argued below, at a minimum, the Tribunal's 2004 resolution should serve as persuasive precedent for the Tribunal now as it assesses the Guidelines.

=== The Tribunal's July 2013 ruling ===
Due to the Government's delay in resolving the Land Reform Bond problem, on October 5, 2011, the Engineers’ Bar Association filed a petition seeking enforcement of this Tribunal's Decision of March 2001, which had declared Law N° 26597 unconstitutional. On July 16, 2013, the Tribunal deemed it necessary to address the request so as to “monitor and ensure definitive compliance with the order” contained in its March 2001 Decision (the “Ruling”), and that is why the Tribunal enacted an enforceability declaration. It reaffirmed its March 2001 Decision that expropriation without payment of fair value, or for which “only the face value was paid,” violated “a basic sense of justice” in accordance with article 70 of the Constitution. In its Ruling, the Tribunal reproachfully summarized the Government's conduct with respect to the payment of the Land Reform Bonds: “(…) although the Executive Branch initially showed willingness to honor the debt resulting from the expropriations conducted as part of the Land Reform [...] it later abandoned its efforts and to date the State has failed to establish criteria for the ‘valuation and payment of the adjusted amount of the debt,’ much less paid it. On the contrary, as counsel for the Engineers’ Bar Association has shown, the Executive Branch, in various responses given to persons whose property was expropriated under the Land Reform, and through its government attorneys in claims filed to collect the fair price owed, has consistently denied the need to adjust the amount of the debt, given that there is no court or administrative order to do so, and the judgment of this Court ‘cannot apply to events that occurred before the judgment was rendered.’”

While the Tribunal’s decision reaffirmed that the Government is obliged to pay the current value of the debt, it also went further and considered several methods for calculating that current value. Among those methods was the one most commonly used to update delinquent Peruvian debts, namely the CPI method. However, the Tribunal held, without citing any supporting evidence, that using the CPI method would yield an amount that would jeopardize Peru’s compliance with other obligations, including the provision of “public services.” In other words, the Tribunal appeared to consider that Peru could not afford to pay the debt if calculated using the CPI method. Accordingly, in an act of purported balancing of the bondholders’ constitutional rights against this asserted threat to the general welfare, the Tribunal endorsed a different method: “calculating the adjusted value of the bonds by indexing the existing obligations to the equivalents in foreign currency” and then “applying the interest rate for United States Treasury Bonds.” The Tribunal thus ordered that “within six months of this Ruling, the Executive Branch shall issue a supreme decree regulating the procedure for the recording, valuation and forms of payment of the land reform bond debt.”

Subsequently, on November 4, 2013, after interested persons and organizations – including the Association – filed motions for annulment and clarification of the Ruling, this Tribunal provided that although the MEF had the authority to issue Guidelines, “the process of adjusting the debt” should “under no circumstance” lead to a “result that reflects the practical application of a nominal criteria” and it reserved its jurisdiction to monitor calculation processes leading to a nominal payment.

=== The MEF's January 2014 guidelines ===
In January 2014, the MEF issued the guidelines containing the “Regulations for the Administrative Process of Recording, Adjusting and Paying the Land Reform Bond Debt.” The guidelines set out a “mandatory” procedure for bondholder claims. To initiate that administrative procedure, however, any bondholder that is a party to ongoing judicial proceedings seeking payment of the value of the bonds must first “abandon” those proceedings and any rights to participate in any other legal proceedings in the future. Sovereign debt restructuring is not uncommon, and Peru has – as a matter of fact – restructured its sovereign debt several times in the past. But it has never asked creditors to waive their procedural rights just to reconcile the amount due. This is followed by a complex, bureaucratic and uncertain administrative process. That process could take up to seven years before the bondholders receive any value: five years for bondholders to file their “applications” to be “officially identified and registered” as the bonds’ legitimate holders, followed by a two-year process to hear each individual claim. This two-year period consists of eighteen months for the MEF to “register” the application; and six months to finalize the “administrative updating.”

The guidelines provide that no payment of any kind can occur until an unspecified “minimum” quantity of claims has been submitted. More generally, the guidelines say nothing about the form of compensation bondholders might ultimately receive, leaving it unclear if the government ever will pay in cash or will simply issue another bond with below market terms and long maturity. In fact, article 17.1 merely indicates that the MEF, “taking into account principles of fiscal balance and financial sustainability,” as well as “fiscal rules” and the “multi-annual macroeconomic framework,” shall “define the options that the bondholders may choose from” for the purposes of collecting.

The guidelines also contain provisions stating how the government proposes to calculate the debt due to each bondholder. It describes these calculations by a series of complex equations. The equations are not easy for a lay person to understand. They purport to convert a nominal amount of Soles Oro into U.S. dollars using what they call a “parity exchange rate.” However, instead of using a well- established international reference for such a parity exchange rate, the guidelines calculate that rate with another complex equation that is unusual and unfounded.

As Dr. Ivan Alonso and Dr. Italo Muñoz explain in their report submitted along with this brief, the guidelines’ yield the absurd result that as Peruvian currency weakens against the dollar, each Sol is worth more and therefore fewer dollars are required to achieve parity. This makes no sense. This basic error in the equation thus turns the purpose of using a parity exchange rate on its head. The guidelines then apply to this incorrectly restated principal amount not the interest rate stated in the bonds, but an interest rate for U.S. Treasury bills (also known as T-bills) of just one-year duration. The one-year U.S. Treasury bills have interest rates that are not only considerably lower than the interest rates specified in the Land Reform Bonds, but also rates that are considerably lower than U.S. Treasury bonds of durations closer to those of the Land Reform Bonds, as the following chart shows:

Bond	Issuance	CUSIP	Issue date	Yield	Rate
U.S. Treasury	30 years	912810RD2	15/01/2014	3.899%	3.750%
U.S. T-Bills	1 year	912796FG9	13/11/2014	0.140%	0.142%

The information from the table above comes from the U.S. Treasury Department's webpage. It shows the dramatic difference between the interest rate of a 1-year T-bill and a 30-year Treasury bond. There can be no doubt that they are fundamentally different securities. So, instead of applying a 4%, 5% or 6% interest rate, or an interest rate of a 20- or 30-year U.S. Treasury bond, the Guidelines offer bondholders interest rates that are currently less than 0.15%. Dr. Alonso and Dr. Muñoz actually test the outcome of using such different rates and conclude that doing so “has a significant effect on the updated value of the bonds.” Table 3 of their report shows the dramatic difference in compound value for a $1,000 Treasury bond.

As Dr. Alonso and Dr. Muñoz explain in their report, it makes no economic sense to use a short-term interest rate with respect to a long-term bond such as the Land Reform Bonds. Also, the guidelines stop paying interest altogether as of 2013, and make the mistake of converting back to Sol at the average foreign exchange rate of 2013, instead of the exchange rate in effect at the time of actual payment – which, pursuant to the guidelines, may occur many years from now.

As addressed below, the guidelines also discriminate among bondholders, classifying them in: (i) those over 65 years of age; (ii) individuals over legal entities; (iii) the original bondholders over the assignees. The guidelines provide that persons over the age of 65 who are original bondholders are entitled to collect before other individuals who are older than 65 but are not original bondholders. The guidelines then provide the same priority for people under 65 years of age, and thereafter, give preference to legal entities that are holders of the land reform debt, followed by legal entities that have acquired the bonds as part of the payment of obligations provided for under law, and finally, legal entities that acquired the obligations for “speculative ends.” The guidelines do not explain why these classes were established, how any individual bondholder will be classified under them or precisely what use will be made of the classifications in paying bondholders. The fact is, no bond has priority over any other. To the contrary, all the bonds received the same guarantee and are equal in entitling the owner – whoever that may be – to payment of the debt.

The guidelines also make the procedures and the updating methodology established therein the exclusive remedy for bondholders to collect the value of their bonds.

A movement has arisen among Peruvians to request a fairer payout from the government of the remaining outstanding bonds.

=== The MEF's February 2017 update ===
In February 2017, Peru confirmed once again that the agrarian reform bonds are a valid sovereign debt obligation via a new administrative decree, Supreme Decree 034-2017-EF. The decree was signed by President Kuczynski on February 23, 2017 and provides for two clarifications to the mathematical formula from the 2014 decree in narrative form. However, the 2017 decree does not include a copy of the full mathematical formula proposed by Peru and thus does not disclose the amount Peru is offering to pay.

== Recent events ==
=== Rating agency involvement ===
HR Ratings Company

In October 2015, credit rating agency HR Ratings issued a rating of HR D (G) to the Peruvian Agrarian Debt Bonds, classes A, B & C as a result of the government's failure to make payments on the bonds in accordance with their original terms.

Egan-Jones Ratings Company

In November 2015, independent rating agency Egan-Jones Ratings Company (non-SRO) issued the following three ratings on Peruvian sovereign debt:

1. Peruvian Foreign Currency Bonds: Rating "BB"
2. Peruvian Local Currency Bonds ("Soberanos"): Rating "BB−"
3. Peruvian Land Reform Bonds: Rating "D"

Egan-Jones’ sub-investment grade sovereign ratings for Peru were primarily due to weak institutions. Egan-Jones cites the spotty track record of the government, specifically the ongoing default on the agrarian reform bonds. Their press release states, “The Land Reform Bonds were issued between 1969 and 1982 and remain unpaid. Through a recent administrative decree, Peru has made a unilateral offer to pay the Land Reform Bonds in an amount equal to less than 0.5% of the amount owed (i.e. a 99.5% haircut). In addition, Peru’s proposed process subordinates both holders of the bonds who are entities rather than individuals, and purchasers of the bonds on the secondary market. The process also requires bondholders to waive all rights to future legal remedies as a precondition to register their Land Reform Bonds.”

In December 2015, Egan-Jones reaffirmed their ratings following a criminal complaint against a court secretary involved in a 2013 court decision about the agrarian bonds. Criminal charges were brought upon Óscar Arturo Díaz Muñoz by the Peruvian Provincial Criminal Prosecutor's Office No. 12 of Lima.

=== Major credit ratings agencies considerations ===
To date, the major credit ratings agencies have avoided evaluating this debt. As outlined in a June 2016 article in the Financial Times, Moody's stated the bonds weren't "ratable in a manner that is consistent with rated government bonds," and Standard & Poor's stated that it considers the bonds to be "contingent liabilities" but "official documentation and information on the terms and conditions for these bonds has not been established."

In April 2016, U.S. Congress shed light on potential conflicts of interest of the major credit ratings agencies. At this hearing, Representative Brad Sherman stated, "we still have a system where the umpire...is paid by one of the teams, and selected by that team." The U.S. Securities and Exchange Commission does not have specific regulations in place to prevent ratings agencies from picking and choosing particular bond rating engagements. Representatives Mike Fitzpatrick and Stephen Lynch also discussed similar conflicts of interest concerns.

=== Criminal charges in Lima ===
The Peruvian Provincial Criminal Prosecutor's Office No. 12 of Lima brought criminal charges against Óscar Arturo Díaz Muñoz for “falsification of documents in prejudice of the State and of Carlos Mesía Ramírez”. Carlos Mesía Ramírez is an ex-magistrate of the Constitutional Tribunal in Peru. The allegedly tampered ruling abruptly reversed multiple prior court decisions, leaving the agrarian bonds essentially worthless. Criminal charges cite direct evidence that a draft decision ruling in favor of bondholders was manipulated with white-out to become a dissenting opinion of ex-judge Carlos Mesía Ramírez without his consent.

=== U.S. securities law violation ===
In January 2016, as reported by The Wall Street Journal, Columbia University law professor John C. Coffee provided a legal opinion regarding the Peruvian agrarian bonds. His legal opinion advised that Peru's disclosures provided to investors in their SEC prospectuses and prospectus supplements were incorrect. Such disclosures claimed that the country was “not involved in any disputes with its internal or external creditors;” but, citing a memo, among other things, from the MEF identifying at least 400 pending lawsuits and 47 unpaid judgments, Coffee concluded that such statement would be in violation of the Securities Act of 1933.

=== Implications for U.S.-Peru relations ===
U.S.-Peru trade agreement

In February 2016, as reported in the Financial Times, a Connecticut-based hedge fund filed a "Notice of Intent to Commence Arbitration Under the US-Peru Trade Agreement". Gramercy Funds Management filed this claim for $1.3 billion against Peru with respect to an alleged refusal to repay defaulted local bonds (agrarian reform bonds) at a reasonable rate.

Helms-Burton Act

The Helms-Burton Act (Pub. L. 103–236, 108 Stat. 475, 22 U.S.C. § 2370a of Chapter 32 –Foreign Assistance) is a United States federal law enacted as an amendment in 1994 under the U.S. Foreign Assistance Act of 1961. A key purpose of the act is to protect the property rights of U.S. nationals by prohibiting recognition of a government that has not provided compensation for U.S. certified claims against confiscated property, including expropriated land. It has commonly been associated with U.S.-Cuban relations, as it has been used in practice following the expropriation of property formerly owned by Cubans who have since become U.S. citizens. In the case of Cuba, property was expropriated “without the property having been returned or adequate and effective compensation provided,” which directly triggered the use of sanctions by the U.S. government against the country. According to the 1994 Helms-Burton Amendment, if the property of U.S. citizens is expropriated by another country without receiving “adequate and effective compensation” in accordance with “international law,” no further U.S. foreign aid is legally permitted. The amendment also requires that U.S. Executive Directors of each multilateral bank to vote against any loans to such expropriating country. The holders of Peruvian agrarian reform bonds include descendants of expropriated Peruvian landowners that have since become U.S. citizens. While the amendment is not currently being applied to the government of Peru, a review of the situation of U.S. citizens holding agrarian reform bonds fits squarely under an application of the Helms-Burton Amendment as bondholders await a fair compensation.

=== Implications for multilateral organizations ===
Organisation for Economic Co-operation and Development (OECD)

The OECD is an intergovernmental economic organization to which countries apply for membership upon commitment to democracy and the market economy. Peru has expressed an eagerness to become a member of the OECD, stressing a friendly climate for investors. While Peru participates in OECD bodies, guidelines and legal Instruments, it is not currently a member and has not yet received a formal invitation to apply. However, the current administration has signaled a strong interest in becoming a full member. OECD members must enforce the rule of law, develop and support democratic institutions, support free markets and allow unrestricted access to foreign investors. Noting Peru's current dispute with holders of agrarian reform bonds, Peru's failure to repay runs counter to the OECD's commitment to the rule of law, sound debt management, free markets and unrestricted access by foreign investors as embodied in OECD principles, guidelines and rules. Additionally, Peru's failure to report the outstanding debt to the U.S. Securities and Exchange Commission or International Monetary Fund does not adhere to the OECD's leading practices for reporting public debt and runs counter to the OECD's commitment to transparency standards. Irregularities surrounding the Constitutional Tribunal’s 2013 decision conflict with the OECD's commitment to the rule of law, including public pressure from then President Humala prior to the decision, and the use of white-out to alter court decisions. To date, Peru has neither denied nor condemned the procedural irregularities associated with the Constitutional Tribunal's July 2013 decision, nor has the Constitutional Tribunal or the Executive Branch taken any steps to remedy or address the forgery. The altered decision still exists on the Constitutional Tribunal's website and its proposed dollarization methodology is still being relied upon as a method of payment in subsequent decrees. Prior to accession to the OECD, Peru must seek to resolve its outstanding agrarian bond debt to be in compliance with OECD standards.
