= Luis de la Puente Uceda =

Peruvian politician

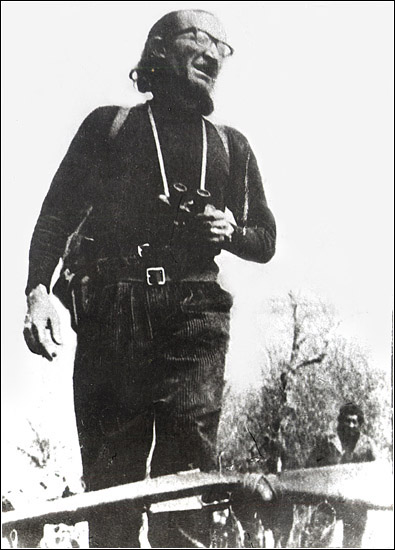
- Luis de la Puente Uceda, Peruvian guerrilla leader
- Born: Luis Felipe de la Puente Uceda; April 1, 1926; Santiago de Chuco, La Libertad, Peru
- Died: October 23, 1965 (aged 39)
- Resting place: Huayopata District, Cuzco, Peru
- Education: National University of Trujillo
- Occupations: Lawyer, Politician
- Political party: APRA, APRA Rebelde, MIR
- Spouse: Carmela de la Puente de Ontaneda
- Children: Luis Felipe and María Eugenia de la Puente de la Puente de Ontaneda
- Parent(s): Juan de Dios de la Puente Ganoza and Rita Uceda Callirgos

Luis de la Puente Uceda (Note: Spanish pronunciation: [ˌlwis de la ˌpwente uˈseda]) (April 1, 1926 – October 23, 1965) was a Peruvian activist, politician, land reformer, and guerrilla who protested against the political coexistence and coalition between his party, American Popular Revolutionary Alliance (APRA), and the conservative forces who supported the second government of Manuel Prado Ugarteche (1956-1962), and helped pioneer land reform in Peru.

== Early life ==
He was the son of Juan de Dios de la Puente Ganoza and Rita Uceda Callirgos. After the death of his father, his mother married Arturo Gildemeister. He was the nephew-in-law of Lucía Haya de la Torre, sister of Víctor Raúl Haya de la Torre. He married Carmela de la Puente de Ontaneda, with whom he fathered two children: Luis Felipe and María Eugenia de la Puente de la Puente de Ontaneda.

== Political career ==
A committed leftist, he was imprisoned multiple times as a result of his political activism, and even deported in 1953. In 1959, APRA formed a coalition with the conservative Odriíst National Union (UNO) (in Spanish: Unión Nacional Odriísta) party to oppose the second presidency of Manuel Prado Ugarteche. This despite the fact that as the ruling party from 1948 to 1956, UNO had actively suppressed the APRA. Uceda, on returning from his first trip to Cuba, organized a group of young APRA leaders to protest of this coalition. As a result of his protest, APRA expelled him from the party in 1959, along with the members who supported his position. Uceda founded the party later known as APRA Rebelde,

== Guerrilla war ==
In June 1960 he traveled to Cuba in order to receive political, ideological, and military training. In 1962 he founded (Revolutionary Left Movement (MIR) (in Spanish: Movimiento de la Izquierda Revolucionaria)), and as the proprietor of the Julcan hacienda (La Libertad Region), he worked with the peasants of the region to effect a land reform, which converted the hacienda to smallholdings. He returned to Cuba with a group of MIR militants that December for further training. During 1963, he undertook a tour of the socialist countries in Asia, China, Vietnam, and Korea, and met the leaders of each of those countries (Mao Tse-tung, Ho Chi Minh, and Kim Il Sung). He also visited Europe and other Latin American countries before returning to Peru. On his return, he presented a bill on land reform to the Peruvian parliament on behalf of MIR.

In February 1964, during the first government of Fernando Belaúnde Terry, MIR broke definitively with the established order and took up armed struggle, organizing guerrilla forces that sought the support of the impoverished peasants of the Andean region. Uceda went to Mesa Pelada (Ocobamba District, La Convención Province, Cusco Region) to start the revolution with three MIR columns, initiating the guerilla operation known as Pachacútec. He failed to attract indigenous peasant support or to precipitate a general insurrection in the central highlands of Peru, paralleling Che Guevara's later failure in Bolivia. On October 23, 1965, Luis Felipe de la Puente Uceda died at the hands of the government forces who captured him. The decapitated MIR's last stand was crushed by the army a few weeks after the death of the leftist leader.

== Discovery of body ==
In September 2005, journalists working for the Peruvian magazine Caretas discovered what appeared to be the tomb of the guerrillero in Choquello Huanca (Huayopata District, La Convención Province, Cusco Region). Forensic studies conducted the following year confirmed the body belonged to De la Puente.

== Family ==
His daughter María Eugenia de la Puente, was a candidate in the Peruvian general election of 2006 for the second vice-presidency for the Peruvian National Restoration Party. She was also a Peruvian Humanist Party candidate for the 2010 Lima mayoral race, but lost to Susana Villarán.

== Legacy ==
Although his military defeat was swift, his political ideas played a key role later in the decade. During the dictatorship of Juan Velasco Alvarado, land reforms promoted by Uceda were implemented.

He is also remembered in Julcan for his instrumental role in helping found the Province and effecting the land reform, and there is a school there bearing his name.
