= Socialist Political Action =

Peruvian political party

Socialist Political Action Acción Política Socialista
- Abbreviation: APS
- Leader: Gustavo Mohme Llona
- Founded: 1980
- Dissolved: 1990s?
- Ideology: Socialism
- Political position: Left-wing
- National affiliation: IU (1985-90); MDI (1992)

Socialist Political Action (Spanish: Acción Política Socialista), was a political party in Peru that was founded in 1980 by Gustavo Mohme Llona. It participated in the general elections in 1980, and on the lists of United Left in 1985 and 1990. It joined the Democratic Left Movement (MDI) in 1992, marking its dissolution

== Bibliography ==
- Roberts, Kenneth M. (1998). Deepening Democracy?: The Modern Left and Social Movements in Chile and Peru. Stanford University Press. ISBN 978-0-8047-3194-2.
