= Revolutionary Socialist Party (Marxist–Leninist) =

Revolutionary Socialist Party (Marxist–Leninist) (in Spanish: Partido Socialista Revolucionario (Marxista-Leninista), PSR(m-l)) was a political party in Peru founded in 1978 through a split in the Revolutionary Socialist Party. Its leaders included Antonio Aragón, Carlos Urrutia and Andrés Avelino Mar. It participated in the 1980 general elections on the lists of Popular Democratic Unity.
