= Scipión Llona =

Peruvian scientist

Scipión E. Llona
- Born: December 19, 1864; Lima, Peru
- Died: November 21, 1946 (aged 81); Miraflores, Lima, Peru
- Occupation: Scientist
- Years active: 1900–1946

Scipión Emiliano Llona Gastañeta (Lima, December 19, 1864 — November 21, 1946) was a Peruvian scientist who served as director of Lima's Seismological Observatory from its establishment in 1908 until his death in 1946.

== Biography ==
The son of Emiliano Llona Echeverri and María Rosa Bartolina Gastañeta Rivero, his brother Victor was a writer based in New York City, where he published several novels. Scipión had two daughters with Luisa Gastañeta, Teresa María and Adriana.

He studied at the college of Neuilly-sur-Seine, and then at the Scientific Institute of Lima, directed by José Granda Esquivel. He was a private student of Federico Villarreal. He entered the National School of Engineers, but left his studies due to his father's illness, to attend to his vanadium mine, and other business matters. He won the post of Secretary of the Geographical Society of Lima, an institution founded in 1888. He held this post continuously until his death in 1946.

He collaborated in the creation of the Seismological Observatory of Lima in 1906, alongside other members of the Geographical Society, which began its official activities in 1908. When this Observatory came to be administered by the Ministry of Public Works and Works in 1924, Llona was already its director and from then on it was called the State Seismological Service. He wrote about the Geography of Madre de Dios in the Bulletin of the Geographical Society (1904).

He attended the World Congress of Geodesy and Geophysics in Madrid (1924) representing Peru. He published "Cycloidal Cosmological Theory" in 1919, Volume I. This work was evaluated by a Scientific Committee of the Geographical Society of Lima formed by Federico Villarreal, Hope Jones and Melitón Carvajal, who highlighted the scientific significance of the work. The theory is an attempt to find a cause and effect between the cycloidal movements of any star in the universe and the effects they can have on their interior, and it also studies the forces of inertia caused by the rotation of the planet Earth. It states that Seismology has as its ultimate goal the prediction of earthquakes, refuting the non-predictability of earthquakes expressed by the French seismologist Fernand Montessus de Ballore in Chile.

He was a member of the Pan American Institute of Geography and History, attending as one of the Peruvian delegates at the institute's Third Assembly, held in Lima in 1941. He was also a member of the Founders of Independence Society, the geographical societies of Chile, Mexico, Colombia and the United States.

He died on November 21, 1946, and was buried with the honors of a Minister of State in the Presbítero Matías Maestro Cemetery. His daughter María Teresa worked as a writer in El Comercio and La Prensa, serving as director of Variedades in 1932. A street in Miraflores bears his name.
