= Javier Diez Canseco =

Peruvian politician (1948–2013)

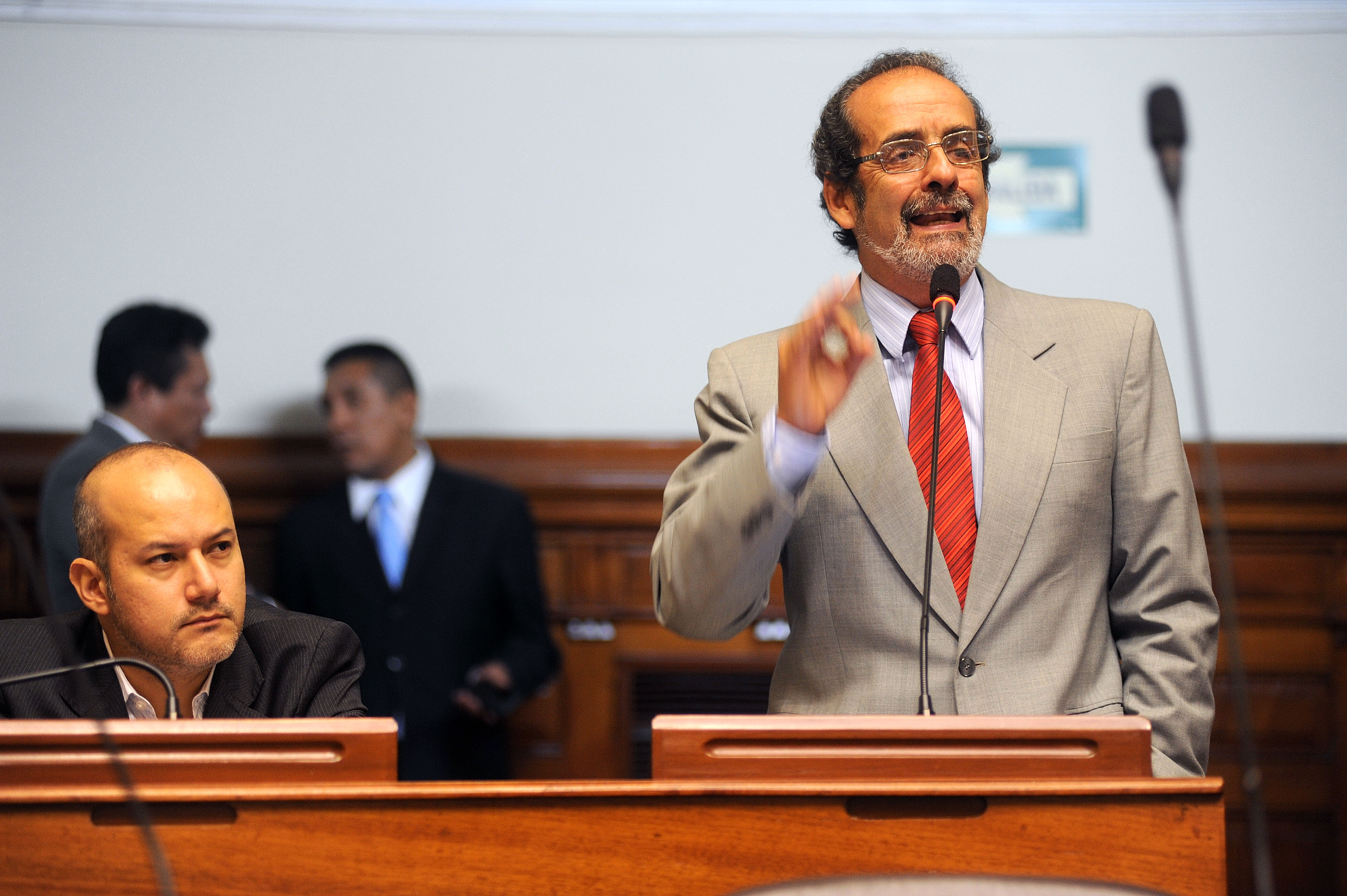
- Javier Diez Canseco speaking in Congress in 2012

Member of Congress
- In office 26 July 2011 – 4 May 2013
- Succeeded by: Manuel Dammert
- Constituency: Lima
- In office 26 July 2001 – 26 July 2006
- Constituency: Lima
- In office 26 July 1995 – 26 July 2000
- Constituency: National

Member of the Senate
- In office 26 July 1985 – 5 April 1992
- Constituency: National

Member of the Chamber of Deputies
- In office 26 July 1980 – 26 July 1985
- Constituency: Lima

Member of the Constituent Assembly
- In office 28 July 1978 – 13 July 1979
- Constituency: National

Personal details
- Born: 24 March 1948 Lima, Peru
- Died: 4 May 2013 (aged 65) Lima, Peru
- Party: Socialist Party of Peru
- Other political affiliations: Peru Wins (2010-2011); Union for Peru(2001-2005); Mariateguist Unified Party; Revolutionary Vanguard
- Education: Pontifical Catholic University of Peru; National University of San Marcos, Lima
- Occupation: sociologist, politician, member of Peruvian Congress
- Website: javierdiezcanseco.pe

Javier Diez Canseco Cisneros (24 March 1948 – 4 May 2013) was a Peruvian politician and member of the Peruvian Congress representing the Socialist Party of Peru (PS), of which he was a founding member and also served as its Party President.

== Early life ==
Javier Diez Canseco was born to a well-to-do Lima family. His parents were Santiago Luis Diez Canseco Magill and Maria del Carmen Cisneros Sanchez. He is a descendant of 19th Century military hero, General Manuel Diez Canseco y Corbacho, and is related to President Fernando Belaúnde Terry. His father, a banker, was general manager of the Banco Popular del Perú, which afforded the family a high level of material comfort.

During his first year of life, Diez Canseco contracted poliomyelitis, resulting in a permanent limp in his left leg. He credits these experiences with his disability as instrumental in helping him comprehend inequality and injustice.

He received his schooling in Lima's Colegio Inmaculado Corazón de Jesús and did his secondary schooling at the Colegio Santa María Marianistas, both religious schools. He studied law at the National University of San Marcos from 1967 to 1968, and sociology at the Catholic University (PUCP) in Lima from 1965 to 1971. Although raised a Catholic, Diez Canseco abandoned the religion while at university.

Diez Canseco was elected chairman of the PUCP's Social Science Student Federation in 1970, and as head of the university's Student Federation the following year. During his time at university he became a member of the left-wing party Vanguardia Revolucionaria, and soon moved out of Lima to work with mine workers in the central highlands. His militancy earned him exile to Argentina and, later, to France by the military governments of Generals Juan Velasco Alvarado and Francisco Morales-Bermúdez. Later, when Vanguardia Revolucionaria merged with other groups to form the Partido Unificado Mariateguista, Diez Canseco emerged as a leader in the new party.

In December 1996, he was one those taken captive by Túpac Amaru Revolutionary Movement (MRTA) guerrillas in the Japanese embassy hostage crisis in Lima, but was released after several days. He subsequently called for a negotiated peace settlement between the government and the MRTA insurgents.

== Political career ==
=== Early political career ===
Diez Canseco was elected chairman of the PUCP's Social Science Student Federation in 1970, and as head of the university's Student Federation the following year. During his time at university he became a member of the left-wing party Vanguardia Revolucionaria, and soon moved out of Lima to work with mine workers in the central highlands. His militancy earned him exile to Argentina and, later, to France by the military governments of Generals Juan Velasco Alvarado and Francisco Morales-Bermúdez. Later, when Vanguardia Revolucionaria merged with other groups to form the Partido Unificado Mariateguista, Diez Canseco emerged as a leader in the new party.

=== Congressional career ===
Diez Canseco served in the Constituent Assembly which drafted the 1979 Constitution, ending twelve years of military rule. He served in both chambers of Congress from 1978 until 1992 (when Congress was dissolved following the "self-coup" of President Alberto Fujimori), from 2001 to 2006, and, as part of President Ollanta Humala's Gana Peru coalition, from 2011 to 2013. He was also a candidate for President of Peru as the head of the Socialist Party of Peru in the 2006 elections. He received 0.5% of the vote, coming in 9th place.

An avowed socialist, Diez Canseco contributed regular OpEds to the center-left daily La República. He was critical of what he saw as the caudillismo of American Popular Revolutionary Alliance (APRA), and during the 1990s, was a vigorous opponent of the dictatorship of President Alberto Fujimori. He also denounced the US-led 2003 invasion of Iraq as "neocolonialism".

From 2002 to 2006, he was chairperson of the National Congress Special Studies Commission on Disabilities in Peru, which developed legislative initiatives, public policies, and advocacy for increased state attention to the issues of people with disabilities. One of the most significant Peruvian laws addressing disability -the General Law on People with Disabibilites, enacted in December 2012- was drafted with his aid.

In 1990 Diez Canseco participated in an inquiry into a government campaign of illegal wiretapping and interception of cellphone communications. In 2002, he led a congressional inquiry into the privatization program undertaken in the 1990s by Fujimori. The committee calculated that of the USD9 billion raised during the privatization process, only a small fraction ended up benefiting the state.

During the government of Alejandro Toledo, between 2003 and 2006, he was president of the Special Study Commission on Disability of the Congress of the Republic, where he promoted the Law on Persons with Disabilities and its subsequent enactment.

He was also involved in investigations of human rights violations committed by both the Shining Path and the Peruvian Armed Forces during Peru's 1980-1992 internal armed conflict -including the 1985 Accomarca massacre-, and was repeatedly subjected to death threats by both sides involved in the violence.

In the 2011 general elections, Diez Canseco supported Ollanta Humala's presidential candidacy and based on a political agreement between the Socialist Party, the Nationalist Party and other left-wing political organizations. He ran as a guest candidate on his Peru Wins parliamentary list. Peru with the number 12 for Metropolitan Lima and Peruvians residing abroad.

After the elections, he managed to be the third candidate for Congress with the highest vote of his party, and one of the most voted in the country. In that sense, he returned to Congress for the period 2011–2016. Javier Diez Canseco was elected with 94,703 votes in Lima, ranking 7th on the national scale of votes for congressmen.

==== Suspension from Congress ====
On 16 November 2012, Diez Canseco was suspended from Congress without pay for 90 days by a vote of a full session of the Congress after the Congressional Ethics Commission found that he had violated the Parliamentary Code of Ethics in presenting bill nº054/2011, which would have, according to the charges, financially benefited his daughter and ex-wife. The motion for suspension was presented although the Ethics Commission's own Technical Board had found that no ethics violation had taken place. The result of the vote was 130 congressmen: 55 voted in favor, 31 against, 4 abstentions and 40 did not vote because they were suspended (4) and absent (36). For his part, Diez Canseco denied any wrongdoing and accused political opponents, including First Lady Nadine Heredia, of colluding against him. However, said measure was annulled on 4 April by the Fifth Constitutional Court of Lima, in response to an amparo action filed by the legislator, since the sanction affected due process, the right to defense and honor of the congressman. The president of the Parliamentary Ethics Commission, Congressman Humberto Lay Sun, announced that they would appeal the ruling.

On 8 April 2013, following an appeal by Diez Canseco the Peruvian judiciary annulled the suspension as having violated Congressional due process. The court also left the possibility open for its reinstatement pending a new, more specific, report from the Congressional Ethics Committee. In early May 2013 a higher court rejected Congress' appeal and ratified the annulment of the suspension.

This was not the first time Diez Canseco was suspended from his Congressional and Senatorial duties. On 13 December 1983, he was suspended for 120 days for having snatched a document out of the official lector's hands during a heated debate on the floor. In 1988, he was again suspended on 3 September for having punched a fellow congressman in the mouth, and for having violated congressional norms by speaking by telephone with a television news program during a closed session of the legislature.

== Death threats and attempts on his life ==
In the predawn hours of 14 November 1990, twenty-four hours before the findings of the wiretapping inquiry were to be handed in, a dynamite attack was carried out at the Diez Canseco home. An explosive was detonated moments before at a neighboring house, presumably in an unsuccessful attempt to draw Diez Canseco to the front door of his home, where a second charge was detonated. The police initially suggested it had been an attack by the Shining Path, but later evidence indicated that it had been the work of the government's Grupo Colina death squad.

In 1995 his name was included at the top of a list of names accompanying a funeral floral arrangement left at the entrance of the headquarters of the Association for Human Rights. The note was signed "Comunidad Colina".

In March 1997, Diez Canseco's car was fired upon by heavily armed assailants wearing bullet-proof vests, but he was not riding in it at the time. The attackers took control of the vehicle, and took its occupants, Diez Canseco's chauffeur, bodyguards, and a friend, to an unknown location in Lima where they were interrogated and later freed. The assailants claimed they were police officers.

In 1999, on Diez Canseco's birthday, two human skulls were left across the street from his home.

== Illness and death ==
In early February 2013, Diez Canseco revealed that he had pancreatic cancer, for which he had been hospitalized since late January. He died on 4 May 2013. In a posthumous statement on the following day, the congressman's family asked that those congressmen who voted in favor of the 90-day sanction against him not attend the wake, tribute and burial of the renowned politician. On 7 May after a tribute by various popular organizations and sectors of the citizenry. His remains were cremated in the Huachipa Cemetery and his ashes were deposited in the family mausoleum in the Presbítero Maestro Cemetery in Lima.
