= Confederación Campesina del Perú =

Farmers' movement in Peru

Confederación Campesina del Perú ('Peasants Confederation of Peru', abbreviated CCP) is a farmers' movement in Peru. CCP was founded on April 11, 1947. Its first general secretary was Juan Hipólito Pévez Oliveros, a peasants leader from Ica. Another of its leaders was Hugo Blanco. For a long period CCP was the major peasants organization in the country, and closely linked to Marxist political parties.

By the early 1970s CCP was organizationally weak and played a minor role politically. However, in 1973–1974 the organization was revitalized as poor peasants and agricultural labourers who had not benefitted from the 1969 land reform joined its ranks and reunified the organization. These groups seized began a struggle of land seizures, especially in areas in Huaura, Piara and Huaral. By 1978, CCP had a quarter of a million members.

CCP is a member of the international peasants organization Via Campesina. In 2001, CCP added environmental issues to its political agenda.
