= Puka Llacta =

Maoist political party of Perú

- Founded: 1970
- Split from: Communist Party of Peru – Red Fatherland
- Think tank: José Carlos Mariátegui Foundation
- Ideology: Communism; Maoism; Mariateguismo; Marxism–Leninism; Socialist patriotism Peruvian nationalism Market socialism Xi'ism; Dengism; Left-wing nationalism Socialism with Peruvian characteristics
- Political position: Left-wing
- Regional affiliation: São Paulo Forum
- International affiliation: International Communist League (Maoist)
- Slogan: «Servir al pueblo» (Serve the people)

Puka Llacta or Pukallacta (Quechua puka red, llaqta place (village, town, city, country, nation)) is the name of a Peruvian Maoist political group that had its origins in the 1970s.

== History ==
Puka Llacta emerged from a split in the Maoist Communist Party of Peru - Red Fatherland (Partido Comunista del Perú (Patria Roja)). In 1977, Patria Roja broke into 2 factions, one of which took the name "Puka Llacta" Communist Party of Peru, with the intention of making concrete actions toward a Maoist-style people's war.

Like Patria Roja and most other Peruvian communist parties at the time, Puka Llacta was a clandestine organization. Its main bases of support were among workers in the central highlands mining regions of La Oroya and Cerro de Pasco, and in the southern department of Puno.

Puka Llacta did not participate in the nationwide general strike of 19 July 1977, which paralyzed the country and led to the end of the military government of Francisco Morales Bermúdez, charging that it was a "revisionist" maneuver. Puka Llacta then controlled the leading bodies of the Centromín Perú Workers' Federation (Federación de Trabajadores de Centromín Perú), and kept that union out of the strike.

Puka Llacta itself soon split into three distinct, but seemingly connected factions. One of those factions merged into the Shining Path at the start of that party's armed insurgency. In Puno, for example, the Shining Path's first urban cells were composed of militants from Puka Llacta.

Another of the Puka Llacta factions undertook armed propaganda on its own in the Mantaro Valley in the mid-1980s, challenging the Shining Path's hegemony on armed actions. By 1988, however, this competing armed column had been eliminated by the Shining Path.

In 2001, David Jimenez Sardon, who used to be affiliated with Puka Llacta, was elected regional president of Puno under the political party called Autonomous Regional Quechua Aymara. Jimenez, an agronomist from the UNA and manager of the EEAA in Junin and Ancash, had a campaign team composed of relatives and old Puka Llacta comrades.
