= Mariateguist Unified Party =

Peruvian political party

Mariateguist Unified Party Partido Unificado Mariateguista
- Abbreviation: PUM
- Leader: Javier Diez Canseco; Agustín Haya de la Torre; Santiago Pedráglio; Hugo Blanco; Eduardo Cáceres; Carlos Tapia
- Founded: 1984
- Merger of: VR; MIR; PRT; PCR
- Ideology: Communism; Marxism-Leninism; Mariateguism

Mariateguist Unified Party (in Spanish: Partido Unificado Mariateguista – PUM) was a political party in Peru founded in 1984 by Revolutionary Vanguard (VR), Revolutionary Left Movement (MIR), Workers Revolutionary Party (PRT) and a sector of Revolutionary Communist Party (PCR). Leaders included Javier Diez Canseco, Agustín Haya de la Torre, Santiago Pedráglio, Hugo Blanco, Eduardo Cáceres and Carlos Tapia. Maria Elena Moyano was also a member of PUM.

PUM was a part of United Left (IU). In 1990, PUM withdrew from IU. In 1995, it rejoined IU, together with UNIR.

== See also ==
- Communism in Peru
