= Revolutionary Workers' Party (Peru) =

The Revolutionary Workers Party (Spanish: Partido Obrero Revolucionario, POR) was the first Trotskyist political party in Peru. Originally known as the Marxist Workers Group, it changed its name in 1946. Early leaders included Francisco Zevallos, Leoncio Bueno and Francisco Abril de Vivero.

In 1952, Manuel A. Odría jailed or exiled the leadership of the group, which remained largely inactive until he stepped down in 1956. Two rival parties of the same were constituted. One was led by Ismael Frías and affiliated to the International Secretariat of the Fourth International (ISFI); the other led by Félix Zevallos and affiliated to the International Committee of the Fourth International (ICFI). It was this second group that Hugo Blanco joined in 1958, to organise activities under the co-ordination of Nahuel Moreno. In the role, he held a peasant uprising in La Convención in 1962, for which he was jailed and then exiled.

The ISFI and Moreno's supporters in the ICFI reunited in 1963, and it appears that the two Revolutionary Labour Parties reunited at this point, to form the Revolutionary Left Front.

It used to be a member of the Fourth International Posadist.
