= Solidarity Sweden-Latin America =

Swedish solidarity organization

Solidarity Sweden-Latin America is a Swedish solidarity organization that works together with popular movements in Latin America to achieve a fair and sustainable society.

In Swedish the name of the organization is Latinamerikagrupperna and in Spanish it is Solidaridad Suecia-América Latina.
