= Hugo Blanco (politician) =

Peruvian political figure (1934–2023)

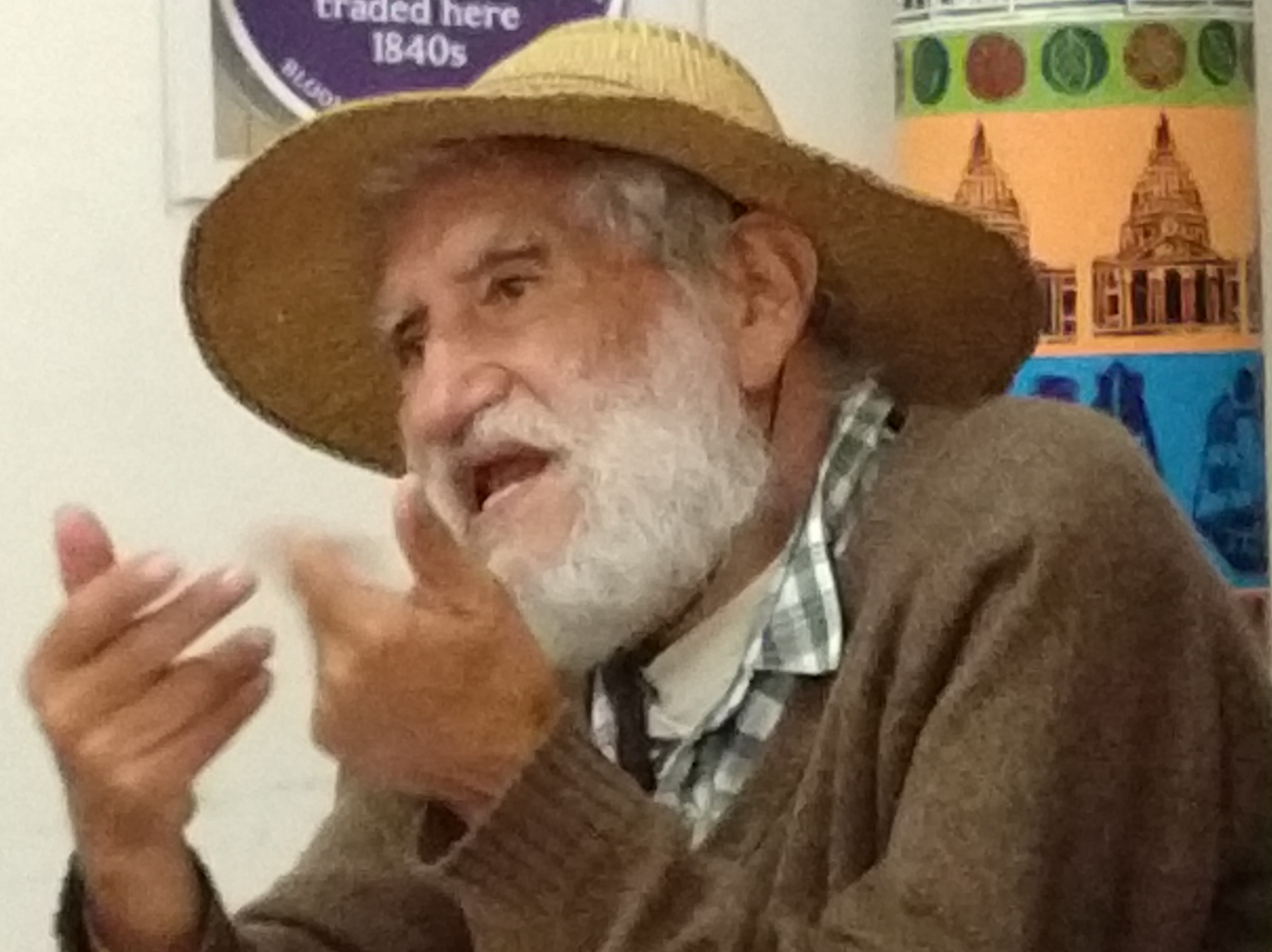
- Blanco in 2019
- Born: Hugo Blanco Galdós; 15 November 1934; Cuzco, Peru
- Died: 25 June 2023 (aged 88); Uppsala, Sweden
- Organization: Confederación Campesina del Perú
- Family: Sissela Nordling Blanco (granddaughter)

Hugo Blanco Galdós (15 November 1934 – 25 June 2023) was a Peruvian political figure, leader of the Confederación Campesina del Perú (CCP, Campesino Confederation of Peru), leader of Trotsky's Fourth International and a writer.

== Early life ==
When Blanco was a child he heard that a landowner applied a redhot iron on an indigenous man. When he was 10 he met an indigenous leader who told him the story of his struggles. He involved himself in school strikes against Manuel A. Odría, which the students won. At age 20 he traveled to Buenos Aires and began studying in the university. There he joined a workers' party after he met Argentinian Trotskyists. Without finishing his agronomic studies in Argentina's Universidad de la Plata he became a worker in a factory because he did not want to work for the landowners. He worked on a coffee plantation as a subtenant farmer.

== Peasant struggle ==
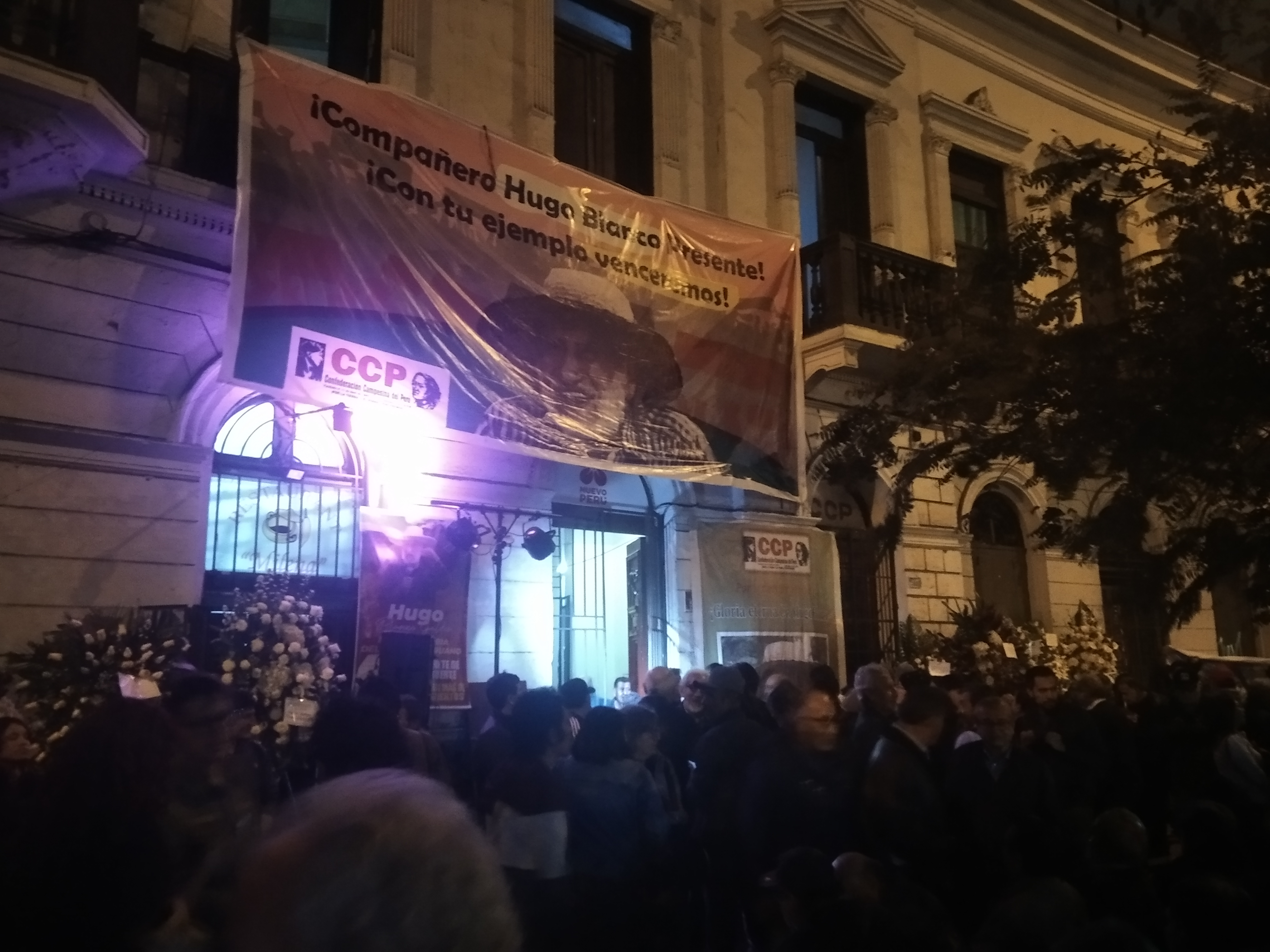
Wake of Hugo Blanco Galdós in Lima

=== Beginning ===
In 1954 Blanco traveled to La Plata, Argentina, to study agronomy. There he met the Trotskyist movement and left his studies. Later he went on to work as a laborer in a refrigerator factory and had his first union experiences. While he was in Argentina the coup against Perón took place, and Blanco participated in the resistance to the coup.

Returning to Peru he joined the Revolutionary Workers Party (POR) in Lima and participated in the famous protest to the then Vice-President of the United States, Richard Nixon, in 1958. Following those demonstrations, Blanco caught the attention of the police, and decided to move from his home region to the Convencion Valley. Here he took residence in 1958 as a subtenant farmer, immersing himself in local politics. Beginning in 1958, with the help of students from the Cuzco University, Blanco’s Quechua federation mobilized the allegados against the hacendados and arrendires.

From 1961 to 1963 he led the Quechua peasant uprising in the Cuzco region of Peru. He was the first who managed to build a bridge between the Spanish speaking intellectuals and the Quechua speaking workers. He organised 2000 peasants in the Departmental Federation of Cuzco Peasants (FDCC) which occupied the landowners' lands and organised the defence of that territory. While holding the Chaupimayo region, Blanco, at the time holding the title of "Agrarian Reform Secretary" formally passed a land reform. Blanco's Chaupimayo Community had its government, public law, popular justice, defense and education, Blanco called this "dual power". It was reported at this time that, while he was arresting a hacienda owner in Pucyura who was accused of raping a little girl, he shot a police officer in self-defense. According to some historians this seems to be propaganda, since he could not have been at Pucyura at the time. De la Puente rejected a union with Blanco because Blanco was a Trotskyist. Captured by the military, he was sentenced to 25 years imprisonment on the island of El Frontón. Nearly all his Trotskyist comrades were already in prison when he was captured. In 1963, unionists took the city of Quillabamba, who were carrying out an order, that was issued in Cuzco by the Federation, to go on strike, so that some imprisoned union leaders, among them, Hugo Blanco would be freed. During his imprisonment he wrote Land or Death: The Peasant Struggle in Peru. During this time he exchanged letters with José María Arguedas which were written in Quechua. In 1968 he was chosen by the Swedish section of Amnesty International as prisoner of the Year.

== Exile ==
In 1971 Blanco was deported to Chile. During Augusto Pinochet's coup on 11 September 1973, he took refuge at the Swedish embassy, from where he was smuggled out of the country under dramatic circumstances under the leadership of Ambassador Harald Edelstam in 1976 following an international solidarity campaign that included Jean-Paul Sartre, Simone de Beauvoir, and Bertrand Russell. In 1976, he became a political refugee in Sweden, where he supported himself among another jobs as a language teacher at Sando school and as a warehouse worker in a Press Office. In 1977, the United States Committee for Justice to Latin American Political Prisoners (USLA) got a non-immigrant visa for Hugo Blanco so he could travel to the U.S.A. where he spoke on a tour that was organized by USLA. Blanco spoke to approximately 10,000 people in the U.S.A.

== Return to Peru ==
After spending several years of exile in Sweden, Mexico and Chile he returned to Peru in 1978, was a founder of the Workers Revolutionary Party and was elected to parliament on a left-wing slate.

In 1980 he was a presidential candidate in Peru, a Leftist Revolutionary Alliance formed to support him. He came in fourth out of sixteen candidates. In 1983 he accused General Clemente Noel, who was then the military chief of the Ayacucho region of murder. Because of this he was suspended from his seat until the end of the current session.

Blanco served in the Peruvian Senate as a representative of the Partido Unificado Mariateguista until 1992 because of Alberto Fujimori's "self-coup" and declaration of a state of emergency, after he received information that both the Peruvian Intelligence Police and Shining Path had sentenced him to death. Together with two of his children and his wife, he fled to Mexico where he was granted asylum following that.

After the Healy Group stated that Joseph Hansen, George Novack and the Socialist Workers Party were aiding Joseph Stalin’s assassins, he signed a statement that refuted the allegations against them.

Hugo Blanco was Director of a Cusco-based newspaper called Lucha Indígena (Indigenous Struggle), and a member of the editorial board of Sin Permiso. In a 2009 interview, Blanco said that, while he still called himself a Trotskyist, he did not think that it was any longer logical to form a Trotskyist party. He added that he also called himself a Zapatista.

In 2008 he was arrested for the crime of “Violence and resisting authority". Many people and institutions demanded his liberation, and since he was not present at the date when the incident happened, the authorities freed him.

== Ecosocialism ==
In 1991 Blanco published an article about the struggle of inhabitants of the town of Ilo and surrounding villages against pollution from the Southern Peru Copper corporation. In 2008 he signed The Belem Ecosocialist Declaration. He said that he supports the workers of the Vestas Wind Turbine on the Isle of Wight who had occupied their factory. In 2010 during September and October he toured Britain. A group of green leftists organized lectures by him all over the country. He said that the current struggle of the indigenous people is not only socialistic but also ecological. He again toured England, speaking at several meetings, in February to March 2019.

== Personal life ==
Blanco was the father of six children, including Carmen Blanco Valer, (born 1959), who grew up in Sweden, who is a chairperson of the Group Solidarity Sweden-Latin America. In 2002 Hugo Blanco suffered a brain hemorrhage during a visit in a peasant community in the Cusco region. Despite all difficulties he managed to be treated in Mexico City, where he remained in Hospital until during 2003. Friends and colleagues from all around the world helped him with the hospital bills.

His granddaughter, by way of his daughter Carmen, is Sissela Nordling Blanco, Spokesperson of the Swedish Feminist Initiative party and candidate for the Riksdag (the Swedish parliament) in the 2014 general election.

Blanco died in Sweden on 25 June 2023, at the age of 88.
