= APRA Rebelde =

Splinter group of the Peruvian APRA

APRA Rebelde was formed in 1959 as a splinter group of the Peruvian APRA. It was founded by a group that was expelled from APRA at a National Congress on October 12. The leader of the APRA Rebelde started orienting itself towards the radical Marxist left. In 1962, the group was refounded as the Revolutionary Left Movement (MIR).
