= Popular Democratic Unity =

Popular Democratic Unity Unidad Democrática Popular
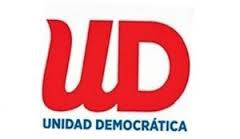
- Abbreviation: UDP
- Founded: 1977
- Dissolved: 1980s?
- Ideology: Communism; Factions: Marxism; Guevarism
- Political position: Far-left
- National affiliation: VR; PCR; MIR; IU (1980s)

Popular Democratic Unity (in Spanish: Unidad Democrática Popular) was a political front in Peru founded in 1977 by Revolutionary Vanguard, Revolutionary Communist Party and Revolutionary Left Movement. UDP contested the 1978 and 1980 elections. In the 1980 and 1983 municipal elections, UDP took part in IU lists.
