= Workers' Revolutionary Party (Peru) =

Worker's Revolutionary Party Partido Revolucionario de los Trabajadores
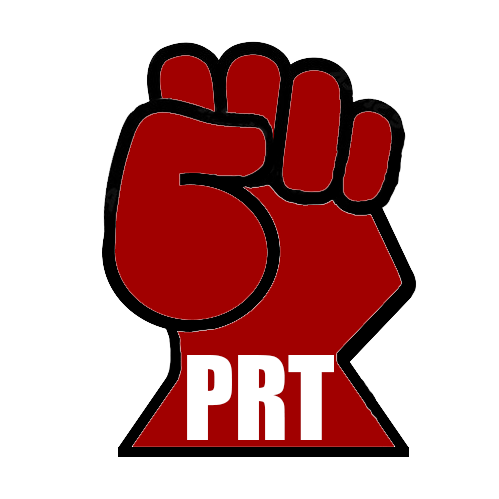
- Leader: Raúl Castro Vera
- Ideology: Trotskyism; Communism
- Colors: Red

The Workers' Revolutionary Party (Spanish: Partido Revolucionario de los Trabajadores) is a Trotskyist political party in Peru founded in 1978 by a fraction of PST, FIR(IV) and FIR(Combate). Its founding leaders included Hugo Blanco, Hipólito Enríquez, Raúl Castro Vera and Nicolás Lucar. It participated in the general elections 1980 and the municipal elections 1980 and 1983.

PRT is currently led by Raúl Castro Vera.

The PRT became the Peruvian section of reunified Fourth International but, in the 1980s, the Fourth Internationals in Peru joined the Partido Unificado Mariateguista.
