= Revolutionary Vanguard =

Political party

Revolutionary Vanguard Vanguardia Revolucionaria
- Abbreviation: VR
- Leader: Ricardo Napurí; César Benavides; Ricardo Letts Colmenares; Edmundo Murrugarra; Walter Quinteros
- Founded: 1965
- Dissolved: 1984
- Merged into: PUM
- Ideology: Communism; Marxism
- Political position: Far-left
- National affiliation: UDP (1970s); IU (1980s)

Revolutionary Vanguard (Spanish: Vanguardia Revolucionaria) was a political party in Peru founded in 1965 by various Marxist groups. Leaders included Ricardo Napurí (who created it after participating to the MIR), César Benavides, Ricardo Letts, Edmundo Murrugarra and Walter Quinteros.

In 1977, VR took part in the foundation of the UDP. It participated in the 1978 elections on UDP lists.

In 1980, VR was one of the founding members of IU.

In 1984, VR merged with other groups to form the Mariateguist Unified Party (PUM).

== See also ==
- Communism in Peru
