= Socialist Workers Party (Peru) =

Political party in Peru (founded 1971)

Socialist Workers Party (in Spanish: Partido Socialista de los Trabajadores, or PST) is a Trotskyist political party in Peru.

In 1980, PST had its candidates on the lists of PRT. On March 7, 1982, the majority wing of the Revolutionary Marxist Workers Party (POMR), led by Senator Ricardo Napurí, merged into PST.

PST was a member of LIT-CI until December 2025. It publishes Bandera Socialista.

In 1992, PST split, and a group adhering to UIT-CI formed a parallel PST.
