= United Left (Peru) =

United Left Izquierda Unida
- Abbreviation: IU
- Leader: Alfonso Barrantes
- Founded: 1980
- Dissolved: 1995
- Ideology: Socialism
- Political position: Left-wing
- National affiliation: UDP; UIR; PCP; PSR; PCR; FOCEP; PUM

United Left (Spanish: Izquierda Unida) was an alliance of leftist political parties in Peru founded in 1980 by Popular Democratic Unity (UDP), Revolutionary Left Union (UNIR), Peruvian Communist Party (PCP), Revolutionary Socialist Party (PSR), Revolutionary Communist Party (PCR) and Worker Peasant Student and Popular Front (FOCEP).

In 1984 UDP and a part of PCR converted itself into the Mariateguist Unified Party (PUM). PUM integrated itself into IU.

IU was led by Alfonso Barrantes Lingán (who lost to Alan García in the 1985 elections) up to 1987. In 1989 IU held its first congress. Gradually the IU disintegrated, with more and more groups deserting it. Recoloured versions of their logo by the Moquegua Entrepreneurial Regional Integration Front in 2018, the Popular Democratic Front in Abancay 2006, the Social Affirmation Movement in Cajamarca, the Democratic Left Movement in Lima 2002, New Left Movement, Junín Popular Block Regional Movement in 2022 and the Más San Martín in 2018. The original Go on Country – Social Integration Party also claimed its legacy.
