= Carlos Gamarra Ugaz =

Peruvian politician

Minister of Justice and Human Rights of Peru
- In office 22 July 2004 – 25 February 2005
- President: Alejandro Toledo
- Prime Minister: Carlos Ferrero
- Preceded by: Baldo Kresalja
- Succeeded by: Eduardo Salhuana

Personal details
- Born: Peru
- Party: Independent Moralizing Front

Carlos Gamarra Ugaz is a Peruvian politician and attorney. He served as the Minister of Justice of Peru from 2006 to 2008. Prior to his ministership, he was a prominent defense attorney in Lima. He later retired after his justice ministership.

== Biography ==
He was president of the Commission for the Formalization of Informal Property (COFOPRI); head of the National Superintendence of Public Registries (SUNARP); and president of the Council of Notaries, between 2001 and 2005.

He has also been head of the National Institute of Concessions and Mining Cadastre (INACC); member of the Mining Registry Advisory Commission, Institutional Head of the Public Mining Registry; Director of Petróleos del Perú, Director of the Banco Minero del Perú; Director and Vice President of the Board of Directors of the Geological Mining Metallurgical Institute (INGEMMET); Director of the Board of Directors of the Scientific, Technological and Mining Institute; member of the Advisory Council of the National Institute for the Defense of Free Competition and the Protection of Intellectual Property (INDECOPI); and vice president and director of the Development Corporation of Lima and Callao (CORDELICA).

In the private sphere, he has been president of the National Institute of Law, Mining and Petroleum; and executive director of the Instituto del Ciudadano.

In the 1990s he was the national secretary for the organization of the Liberty Movement, led by Mario Vargas Llosa.

On July 22, 2004, he was sworn in as Minister of Justice, replacing the resigning Baldo Kresalja, thus forming part of the ministerial cabinet chaired by Carlos Ferrero. In February 2005 he resigned and was replaced by Eduardo Salhuana Cavides. Three other ministers resigned with him, in a ministerial change that the government considered necessary while already in the last stretch of his administration.

He is currently the main partner at CDGM Consultores y Asesores S.A.C.
