= Beatriz Merino =

Peruvian politician and academic

Beatriz Merino OSP
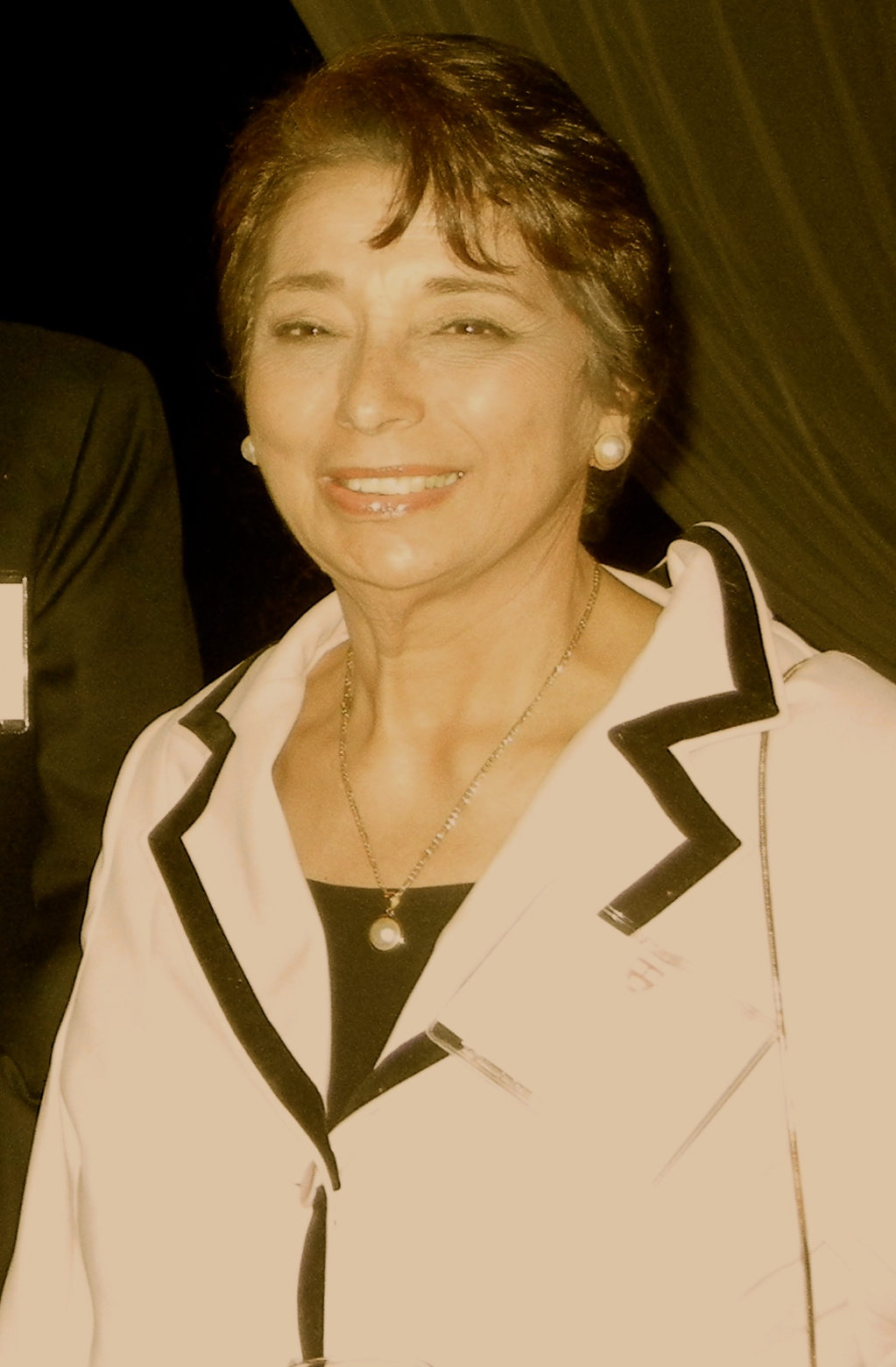
- Merino in 2011

President of César Vallejo University
- In office 1 January 2016 – 31 December 2025
- Preceded by: Office created

2nd Public Defender of Peru
- In office 29 September 2005 – 30 March 2011
- Preceded by: Walter Albán (Acting)
- Succeeded by: Eduardo Vega (Acting)

Prime Minister of Peru
- In office 23 June 2003 – 15 December 2003
- President: Alejandro Toledo
- Preceded by: Luis Solari De La Fuente
- Succeeded by: Carlos Ferrero

Member of Congress
- In office 26 July 1995 – 26 July 2000
- Constituency: National

Member of the Senate
- In office 26 July 1990 – 5 April 1992
- Constituency: National

Personal details
- Born: Martha Beatriz Merino Lucero; November 15, 1947 (age 78) Lima, Peru
- Party: Independent (1992–present)
- Other political affiliations: Liberty Movement (1989–1992)
- Education: National University of San Marcos (LLB); London School of Economics (LLM); Harvard University (LLM)

Martha Beatriz Merino Lucero (born November 15, 1947) is a Peruvian lawyer, academic and politician who served as the first female Prime Minister of Peru, in 2003. She previously served as Senator and Congresswoman from 1990 until 2000. Following her tenure in Alejandro Toledo's cabinet, Merino was appointed by the Peruvian Congress as the national ombudswoman for Peru, serving from 2005 to 2011, a position officially known as the Public Defender, being the second to hold the position.

A female leading persona in Peru, Merino is currently a member of the Council of Women World Leaders, an international network of current and former women presidents and prime ministers whose mission is to mobilize the high-level women leaders globally, for collective action on issues of critical importance to women and equitable development.

== Early life and education ==
Martha Beatriz Merino Lucero was born on November 15, 1947, in Lima, Peru. Her father, Augusto Merino Abrego (1915–2015), was a decorated public servant, serving as Treasurer and Finance Director of the San Isidro municipality. Throughout her career and in various interviews offered to the media, Merino highlighted the influence of her father on her professional development. Her mother was Aída Lucero (1916–2013).

After finishing high school at the Parochial School of Santa Rosa of Lince, Merino enrolled in the National University of San Marcos. Graduating a with law degree in 1970, she was awarded a scholarship in order to attend the London School of Economics graduate program, where she would attain a Master of Laws (LL.M.) in tax law in 1972. Relocating to the United States, she pursued a second Master of Laws at Harvard University with a Fulbright scholarship, becoming the first Peruvian woman to graduate from Harvard Law School, in 1977.

== Career ==
Following her graduation from Harvard, Merino pursued a career at Procter & Gamble, serving as Legal, Commercial, International, Environment and Corporate Manager. She held the positions in Lima, Caracas (Latin America headquarters) and Cincinnati (world headquarters). She was also the director of Procter & Gamble for Peru, Ecuador, Chile, Bolivia and Colombia, from January 1979 to November 1989, and from July 1992 to December 1994.

In 1989, Mario Vargas Llosa invited her to run for the Peruvian Senate in the 1990 general election. Running as part of the Democratic Front (FREDEMO) coalition, she was ultimately elected along twenty other candidates from the Christian People's Party and Popular Action (Peru), being herself a member of the Liberty Movement.

During her time as a Senator, she presided over the Environment, Ecology and Amazon Committee and the Women's Rights Committee. Her tenure would be cut-short on April 5, 1992, as president Alberto Fujimori dissolved congress with a self-coup. She would return to the newly inaugurated unicameral Congress in 1995, running as an independent within the Independent Moralizing Front, led by Fernando Olivera and remained a renowned voice of the opposition against the Fujimori regime.

In 1993, Merino founded the Merino & Reaño Law Firm, where she worked extensively in commercial, labor, corporate and environmental legislation. She was senior partner from 1993 to 2001.

Approaching the 2000 general election, mayor Alberto Andrade of Lima invited Merino as his second running mate for the We Are Peru nomination, alongside Luis Guerrero as first running mate. Despite favorable polling numbers at the start of the race, the government's machinations led by National Intelligence Service ran a smear campaign against Andrade, ultimately destroying his chances in the general election.

Following Fujimori's downfall in late 2000, Merino was appointed Superintendent of the Peruvian Internal Revenue Service, serving from 2001 to 2003. During her two-year tenure, she directed the master's degree program in taxation and fiscal policy at the University of Lima.

=== Prime Minister of Peru (2003) ===
Merino became the President of the Council of Ministers on June 23, 2003, the highest political rank ever held by a woman in the history of Peru, appointed by president Alejandro Toledo. During her brief premiership, she led a successful tax reform bill, and laid over a modernizing restructuring process of the Peruvian government.

On July 18, 2003, she appeared before Congress in order present the general policy of the government and request the confidence vote. Merino referred to the government's economic policy and promotion of economic development and employment. Merino received confirmation of Congress with 61 votes in favor, 1 against and 17 abstentions.

Her management was characterized by lifting the Toledo regime's approval ratings; however, she resigned on December 15, 2003, at the request of Toledo, citing differences in policy management.

In early December 2003, a television program questioned Merino about an alleged influence peddling to favor friends and family during her time as Superintendent at the Peruvian Internal Revenue Service (SUNAT). Given this, in an appearance before the local press denied that she had influenced the hiring for her friends. After that, Merino traveled to the United States for academic conferences.

On December 13, president Toledo asked for the resignation of all his ministers and the 7 presidential advisers.

Upon her return to Lima, Merino explained to the press that she had resigned from the office of Prime Minister on the first day of December and that President Toledo asked her to stay a while longer until he found a successor. She also commented that she was summoned in October by a senior dignitary of the Catholic Church, who informed her that a political leader made accusations against her and questioned her moral integrity. She was succeeded in the premiership by Carlos Ferrero, a prominent member of Possible Peru and three-year president of Congress.

=== Public Defender (2005–2011) ===
After stepping down as Prime Minister, Merino held high approval ratings as a public persona. While On September 29, 2005, Congress elected her as the second Public Defender of Peru, succeeding the acting holder, Walter Albán. Congress had been unable to appoint a new holder since the expiration of Jorge Santistevan de Noriega's term in 2000. She was nominated by the National Unity parliamentary bench. Until her election as Defender, she served at the World Bank as Senior Specialist in the Public Sector area, in charge of issues related to Tax Administration and Policy, Modernization of the State and Strengthening of Congresses for Latin America.

During her term as Public Defender, she successfully called for the release of peasants from Chaca (Ayacucho) unfairly accused of terrorism, raised the inquiry on the creation of the Ministry of the Environment (2008), recommended the reform of the Pension Standardization Office (2008–2009), took over the Vilma Palma Case achieving a first sentence for discrimination in Peru (2009), and contributed in the Prior Consultation Law (2009). Overall, she has been cited for contributing to the restoration of peace and the restitution of the affected rights of the most vulnerable sectors of the Peruvian population.

=== Later career (2011–2015) ===
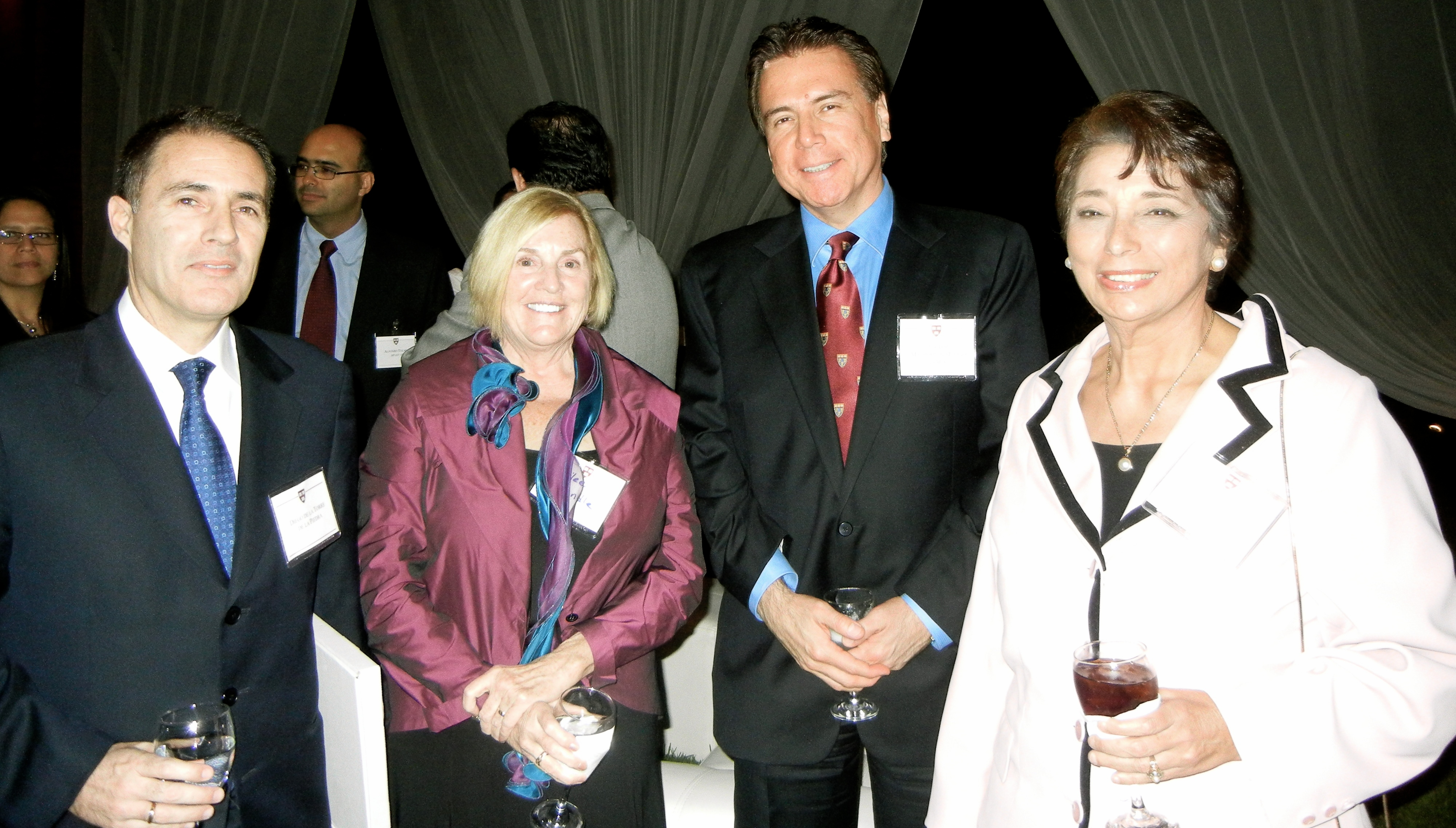
From left to right. Leading Peruvian businessman Diego de la Torre, Director of the David Rockefeller Center for Latin American Studies Merilee Grindle, President of the Harvard Law School Association of Peru Víctor M. Marroquín, and Merino at a Harvard Club of Peru meeting in December 2011.

Her term in the Office of the Public Defender expired in 2010, but she remained in office until she tendered her resignation on March 30, 2011, being succeeded by Eduardo Luna Vega, who served as acting defender until the election of Walter Gutiérrez Camacho en 2016. Following her resignation, she was appointed Chairwoman of the Public Pension's Administrators Association. She stepped down on January 16, 2012. During her time in office, she contributed to the expansion of knowledge of the private pension's system throughout the country, taking over the initiative of improving the benefits of affiliated members.

In November 2011, she was appointed director of the Center for Social Responsibility, Entrepreneurship and Sustainability of CENTRUM, renowned business school of the Pontifical Catholic University of Peru. She stepped down from the academic post in November 2015. Conjointly, she served as Chairwoman of the National Hydrocarbons Society, from January 2013 to December 2015.

Merino is part of the Advanced Leadership Initiative at Harvard University.

=== César Vallejo University (2016–2025) ===
Academically, she currently serves as executive president of the César Vallejo University since February 8, 2016, appointed by then-presidential nominee César Acuña Peralta, who has allegedly committed plagiarism in his doctoral dissertation and has been involved in several cases of money laundering. Following these allegations, Francisco Miró Quesada Rada resigned as executive president, due in particular to the plagiarism allegations against Acuña in the middle of the presidential campaign.

Under Merino's leadership, the university formally implemented the Turnitin plagiarism detection service. Before, there was no plagiarism detection service available at the university, being among the plagiarizers future Peruvian president Pedro Castillo and first lady, Lilia Paredes, both graduate students of the same university back in 2012. Recently, Gavin Jones scientist of the United States Forest Service Rocky Mountain Research Station denounced that two undergraduate thesis students also plagiarized an academic article of his.

After almost ten years as executive president, Merino announced her resignation from the position on 2 December 2025. In her resignation letter, she stated that her tenure had begun on 1 January 2016 and highlighted the university’s transformation during her leadership, noting that it had grown from an unlicensed institution with just over 60,000 students to one of the largest private universities in Peru with 215,000 students and institutional licensure. Merino thanked the teaching, administrative staff and students for their trust and support, expressed her satisfaction with the accomplishments of her administration, and wished the university continued success. Her resignation was tendered as part of closing a personal and institutional stage and was effective on 31 December 2025.

== Awards and recognitions ==
- Doctor Honoris Causa - Federico Villarreal National University (2003)
- Doctor Honoris Causa - Private University of Chiclayo (2003)
- Order of the Southern Cross in the Degree of Grand Cross - Federative Republic of Brazil (2003)
- Order of Merit in the Degree of Grand Cross - National Police of Peru (2003)
- "María Elena Moyano" Award - Ministry of Women and Social Development (2003)
- "Robert G. Storey" Leadership Award - Center for American and International Law (2004)
- Order of the Sun of Peru in the Degree of the Grand Cross - Republic of Peru (2006)
- Doctor Honoris Causa - National University of Saint Augustine (2007)
- Flora Tristán Medal - National University of San Marcos (2009)
- Order of the Merit of Women - Ministry of Women and Social Development (2010)
- Citizen Merit Medal - Presidency of the Council of Ministers of Peru (2010)
- Medal "Francisco García Calderón" - Lima Bar Association (2010)
- Lifetime Achievement Award - Harvard University (2015)
- Doctor Honoris Causa - Universidad César Vallejo (2015)
- Trailblazer Award - Women Political Leaders (2019)
- Doctor Honoris Causa - National University of San Marcos (2025)

== Electoral history ==
=== Executive ===
| Election | Office | List | Votes | | | Result | Ref. |
| Election | Office | List | Total | % | P. | Result | Ref. |
|---|---|---|---|---|---|---|---|
| 2000 | Second Vice President of Peru | We Are Peru | 333,049 | 3.00% | 3rd | Not elected | |

=== Legislative ===
| Election | Office | List | # | District | Votes | | | Result | Ref. |
| Election | Office | List | # | District | Total | % | P. | Result | Ref. |
|---|---|---|---|---|---|---|---|---|---|
| 1990 | Senator of the Republic | Democratic Front | 7 | National | 73,428 | 32.06% | 1st (Note: Presented on an electoral list. The data shown represents the share of the vote the entire party/alliance received in that constituency.) | Elected | |
| 1995 | Member of Congress | Independent Moralizing Front | 5 | National | 8,970 | 4.89% | 4th | Elected | |

Political offices
| Preceded by Luis Solari De La Fuente | Prime Minister of Peru; 2003 | Succeeded by Carlos Ferrero |
