= Alto Monte de Israel, Peru =

Settlement in the Peruvian Amazon

Coordinates: 3°53′17″S 71°27′09″W

The community of Alto Monte de Israel (High Mount of Israel) is a settlement located on the banks of the Amazon River, in the district of San Pablo, province of Mariscal Ramón Castilla department of Loreto, in Peru. It was created in 1994 by its founder, Ezequiel Ataucusi Gamonal. It is a religious community, whose extension was planned in the South American integration project of living borders of Peru, where Ataucusi was a pioneer and executor of said project for the countries of Colombia and Brazil.

It is a community of the religious sect Evangelical Association of the Israelite Mission of the New Universal Covenant (AEMINPU), better known as the Israelites of the New Pact. It is located east of Iquitos, the capital of the department, an 18-hour boat ride on the Amazon River. The river transport is the only means of connection with the community.

== Population ==
Its population is made up of immigrants from different departments of Peru, and native people local to the area. Most of its inhabitants work in agriculture.

Alto Monte de Israel is considered to be in poverty. It does not have electric power, it does not have running water or a drainage system, or internet.

It is distinct from the other communities in the area for being very religious, autonomous with its own rules and regulations. They reject any support from the Peruvian state or other entities outside the congregation, and are governed in accordance to their interpretation of the 10 commandments.

== History ==
In the early 1990s, Ezequiel Ataucusi began decentralization, convinced his faithful to migrate to the mountains to establish his promised land, specifically the Lower Amazon, the banks of the Amazon River in the border province of Ramón Castilla and at its confluence with the Yavarí-Mirín River. Ataucusi participated in this process and adopted the place as Alto Monte, indoctrinating his followers in his beliefs, organizing them into work groups and teaching them to work in agriculture.

The inhabitants of Alto Monte, called Israelites, most of them wear tunics, the men let their beards and hair grow, the women wear a veil as a symbol of modesty. According to their beliefs, the Sabbath, new moon and the three festivals a year are sacred dates, on which no one works, instead they perform religious worship and offerings based on sacrifices.

They have been accused of growing coca leaves for cocaine production.

== See also ==
- Agricultural People's Front of Peru
- Populated centres of Peru
