= Eduardo Salhuana =

Peruvian politician (born 1962)

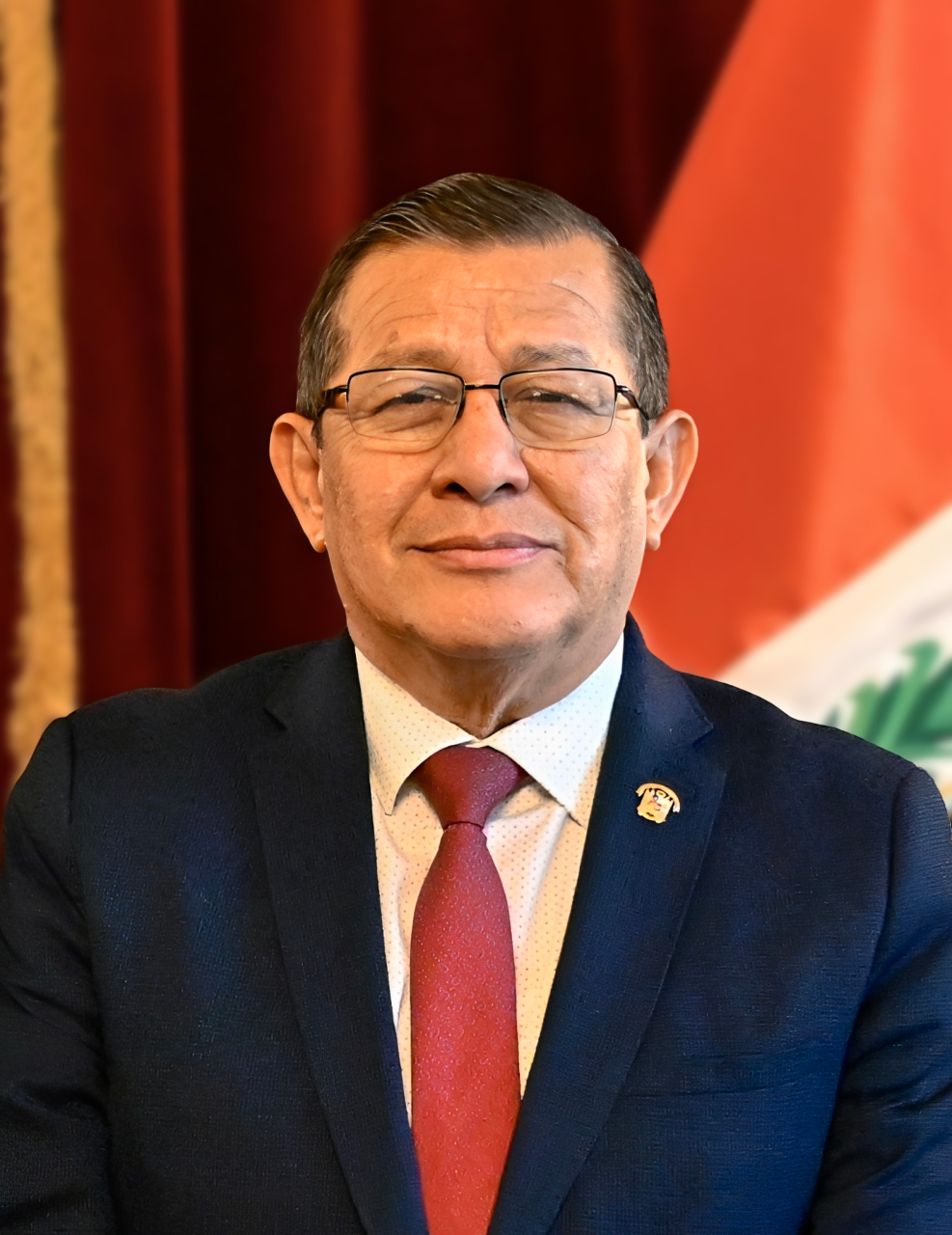
- Official portrait, 2025

President of Congress
- In office 27 July 2024 – 26 July 2025
- Vice President: 1st Vice President; Patricia Juárez; 2nd Vice President; Waldemar Cerrón; 3rd Vice President; Alejandro Cavero
- Preceded by: Alejandro Soto Reyes
- Succeeded by: José Jerí
Ministerial offices
Minister of Justice
In office 25 February 2005 – 16 August 2005
President	Alejandro Toledo
Prime Minister	Carlos Ferrero
Preceded by	Carlos Gamarra Ugaz
Succeeded by	Alejandro Tudela

Member of Congress
- In office 27 July 2021 – 26 July 2026
- Preceded by: Alexander Lozano Inostroza
- Constituency: Madre de Dios
- In office 27 July 2001 – 26 July 2006
- Preceded by: Constituency established
- Succeeded by: Juan Perry
- Constituency: Madre de Dios

Member of the Chamber of Deputies
- In office 27 July 1990 – 5 April 1992
- Preceded by: Simón Gonzalo Horna Mejía
- Succeeded by: Chamber of Deputies abolished
- Constituency: Madre de Dios

Personal details
- Born: Eduardo Salhuana Cavides; September 1, 1962 (age 64) Cuzco, Peru
- Party: Alliance for Progress
- Other political affiliations: Perú Posible; National United Renaissance (2001); United Left (1990-1992)
- Education: National University of Saint Anthony the Abbot in Cuzco

Eduardo Salhuana is a former member of the Congress of Peru of the Perú Posible party representing Madre de Dios. He was Minister of Justice of Peru during the Alejandro Toledo presidency.

== Education ==
He attended school in his hometown. In 1980, he entered the Law School of the National University of Saint Anthony the Abbot in Cuzco, graduating with a degree in Law and Political Science in 1986.

== Career ==
In his professional career, he was a mixed judge in Puerto Maldonado; member of the Mixed and Decentralized Chamber of Madre de Dios; legal advisor to grassroots organizations and representative unions of Madre de Dios; and Dean of the Lawyers Association of Madre de Dios (2000-2001).

=== Politics ===
In 1990, he entered politics as a member of United Left (IU), being elected deputy for Madre de Dios, a period that was frustrated by the 1992 self-coup. In 1997 he unsuccessfully ran for mayor of the Tambopata Provincial Municipality, in a questioned election that gave the ruling candidate the winner.

After the fall of the Fujimori regime, he ran in 2001 as a candidate for the National Congress for the National United Renaissance group, winning with 40.97% of the departmental vote, the highest percentage vote at the national level. During his parliamentary function, he was a member of the Justice, Constitution and Budget commissions. He was also president of the Commission on Amazon, Indigenous and Afro-Peruvian Affairs. He was one of the promoters in declaring the South Interoceanic Highway of national interest, which he considered essential to achieve economic integration with Brazil.

On February 25, 2005 he was sworn in as Minister of Justice, replacing the resigning Carlos Gamarra Ugaz, forming part of the ministerial cabinet chaired by Carlos Ferrero. He resigned when the ministerial crisis of August 2005 occurred, which led to the fall of the Ferrero cabinet.

In 2015, he was appointed General Manager of the Madre de Dios Region.
