= Peruvian Socialist Movement =

Political party in Peru

Peruvian Socialist Movement Movimiento Socialista Peruano
- Abbreviation: MSP
- Leader: Carlos Tapia; Sinesio López
- Founded: 1989
- Split from: PUM
- Ideology: Socialism
- National affiliation: ASI; IS

Peruvian Socialist Movement (Spanish: Movimiento Socialista Peruano), was a political party in Peru founded in 1989, through a split in the Mariateguist Unified Party (PUM). Leaders of MSP included Carlos Tapia and Sinesio López. It contested on the lists of ASI in the municipal elections 1989 and on the lists of IS in the general elections 1990. Later MSP was dissolved.
