= Left Socialist Party =

Left Socialist Party may refer to:

- Left Socialist Accord (Peru)
- Left Socialist Action (Russia)
- Left Socialist Party (Sweden)
- Left Socialist Party (Tunisia)
- Left Socialist Party of Japan
- Left Socialists (Denmark)
- Left Socialist-Revolutionaries, a party in Russia

== See also ==
- List of socialist parties
- Socialist Left Party, Norway
