= MBH =

MBH and variant capitalisations can refer to:

- Movimiento de Bases Hayistas (Spanish), see Hayist Bases Movement
- A unit of power - a thousand BTUs per hour
- "mbH" (German: mit beschränkter Haftung) see Gesellschaft mit beschränkter Haftung
- Mbh, abbreviation for Mahabharata used in citations
- MBH Architects
- Maryborough Airport (Queensland), IATA airport code "MBH"
- The Morita-Baylis-Hillman reaction
