= Liberalism in Peru =

This article gives an overview of liberalism in Peru. It is limited to liberal parties with substantial support, mainly proved by having had a representation in parliament. It is also limited to programmatic parties and not personalist electoral vehicles.

== Introduction ==
Liberalism has not been organised in Peru for many years.

== The timeline ==
=== Liberty Movement ===
- 1987: Mario Vargas Llosa founded the Liberty Movement (Movimiento de la Libertad).
- 1988: The conservative liberal wing set up an electoral alliance with two clerical fascist parties and two opportunistic personalist electoral vehicles. Anti-clerical dissidents set themselves apart with a party with the same name the Liberty Movement (Movimiento de la Libertad). There were two parties with the same name, which is not uncommon in politics.
- 1990: The party split from the electoral alliance and began to defend liberalism in earnest with six senators and nine representatives.
- 1992: The civil war broke out against Fujimorians and the party organised the government in exile together with some extra-parliamentary parties. The party kept on defending the Final Constitution, which ironically had been drafted by proto-Fujimorians in 1979.
- 1993: Some traitors in the conservative liberal wing, who had proposed the electoral alliance with some clerical fascist parties and electoral vehicles, tried to disband the Liberty Movement, but they were arrested by those members loyal to the Peruvian government in exile. The conservative liberal wing contested municipal elections, which proved their treason to the legitimate government; in order to avoid the guilt, the conservative liberal wing dissolved their own organisation Liberty Movement. However, Liberty Movement survived these betrayals.
- 2025: The party as a leaderless movement claimed to have 8 million members.
- 2026: Members of the party have not taken part in the Fujimorian political elections since 1992.

== Liberal leaders ==
- Pedro Beltrán
- Pedro Roselló
- Enrique Ghersi

== Liberal thinkers ==
In the contributions to liberal theory the following Peruvian thinker is included:

- Gonzales Prada

== See also ==
- History of Peru
- Politics of Peru
- List of political parties in Peru
