= Revolutionary Socialist Party (Peru) =

Political party in Peru

Revolutionary Socialist Party Partido Socialista Revolucionario
- Abbreviation: PSR
- Leader: Víctor Oliva Miguel
- Founded: November 1976
- Dissolved: 26 November 2022
- Merged into: Party of the Peruvian Revolution
- Headquarters: Lima
- Newspaper: El Socialista
- Ideology: Socialism; Peruanismo; Left-wing nationalism Left-wing populism
- Political position: Left-wing

Website
- partidosocialistarevolucionario.org

Revolutionary Socialist Party (in Spanish: Partido Socialista Revolucionario), was a political party in Peru formed in November 1976 by a group of radical army officers who had been active in the "first phase of the revolution" under Velasco Alvarado and who subsequently advocated a return to the objectives of the 1968 coup.

== History ==
The party's founders included several people from the Velasco Alvarado government, such as general Leónidas Rodríguez Figueroa, general Jorge Fernández Maldonado, Enrique Bernales Ballesteros and Alfredo Filomeno.

The PSR was founded for the purpose of participating in the 1978 elections for the Constituent Assembly and won 6 of the 100 seats.

Subsequent to the 1978 election, the party split into the Revolutionary Socialist Party (Marxist–Leninist) (PSR-ML) and the PSR-Leónidas Rodríguez Figueroa. The PSR-ML played a dominant role in what was left of the National Agrarian Confederation, which had been set up by Avelino Mar during the Velasco Alvarado administration.

During the 1980s, PSR was part of IU. In 1989, PSR participated in the elections of the lists of ASI and in 1990 with IS.

In the 2011 Peruvian general election, the party took part in the successful Peru Wins alliance of Ollanta Humala.

PSR published El Socialista.
