= Socialist Left (Peru) =

Socialist Left Izquierda Socialista
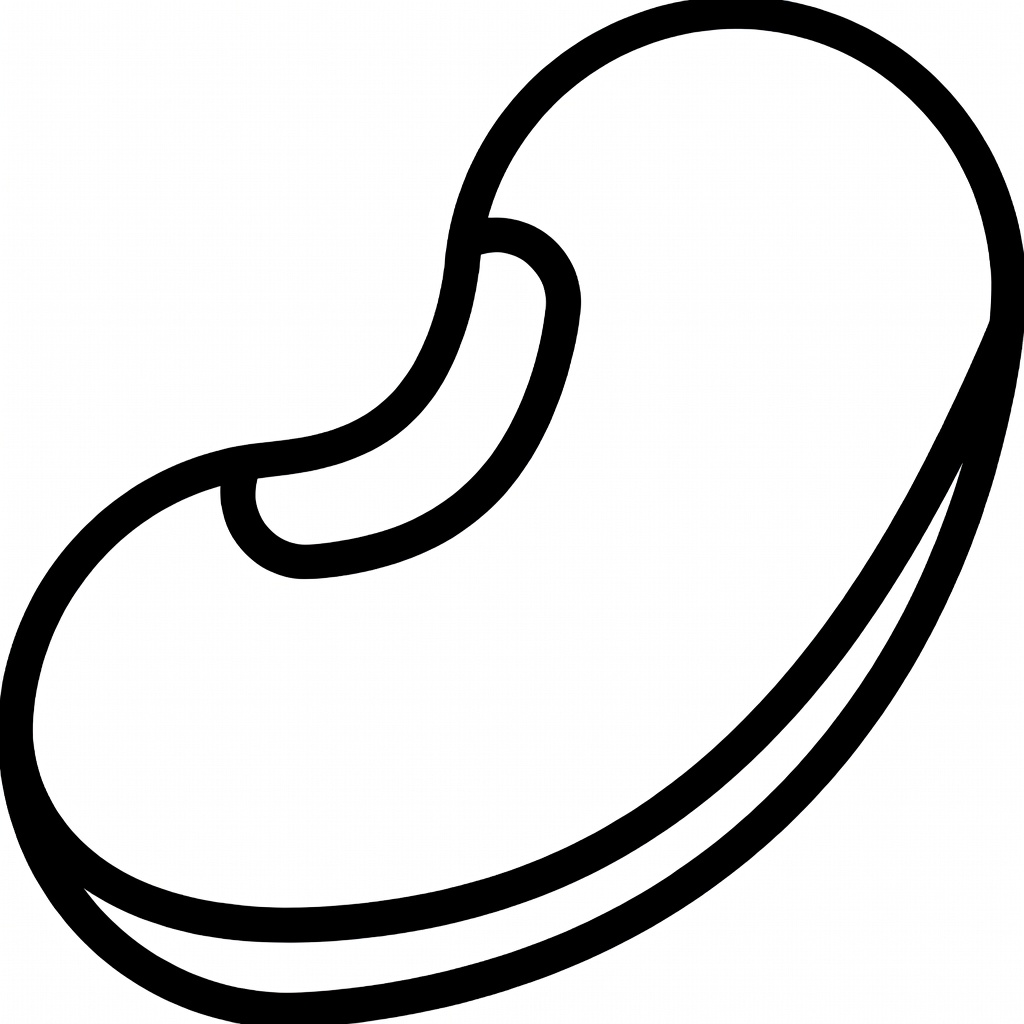
- Abbreviation: IS
- Leader: Alfonso Barrantes
- Founder: Alfonso Barrantes
- Founded: 1989
- Dissolved: 1992
- Preceded by: ASI
- Ideology: Socialism; Democratic Socialism; Mariáteguism
- Political position: Left-wing
- Colors: Red

Socialist Left (Spanish: Izquierda Socialista or IS) was an electoral alliance in Peru formed by Left Socialist Accord (ASI) and the non-party socialist movement in 1989. In the 1990 presidential elections, IS launched 1985 presidential candidate Alfonso Barrantes Lingán as its candidate but lost.

== Background ==
By 1989, United Left (IU) was experiencing deep internal divisions. The disagreements centered on issues such as support for the nationalization of banks promoted by Alan García 's APRA government, the stance towards armed violence by groups like Shining Path and the MRTA, and the coalition's overall ideological orientation. Alfonso Barrantes, former mayor of Lima and one of the leaders of the leftist alliance, decided to break with the more radical sector of IU, led by figures like Henry Pease , and founded the Leftist Socialist Agreement (ASI) with like-minded groups, which later evolved into a broader alliance.

Following a poor performance in the 1989 municipal elections, the ASI attempted to reach agreements with IU that would allow them to participate on a single list in the 1990 general elections, but the negotiations failed. In response, the ASI transformed itself into Socialist Left, incorporating several parties and movements that sought a renewed left, distanced from orthodox Marxism–Leninism and closer to social democratic or democratic socialist positions.
