= 1985 Peruvian general election =

- 14 April 1985
- Presidential election
- Turnout: 90.59% (▲11.45pp)
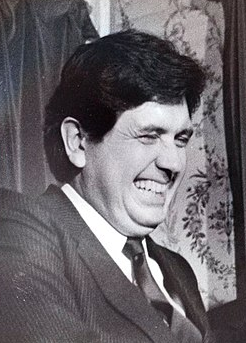

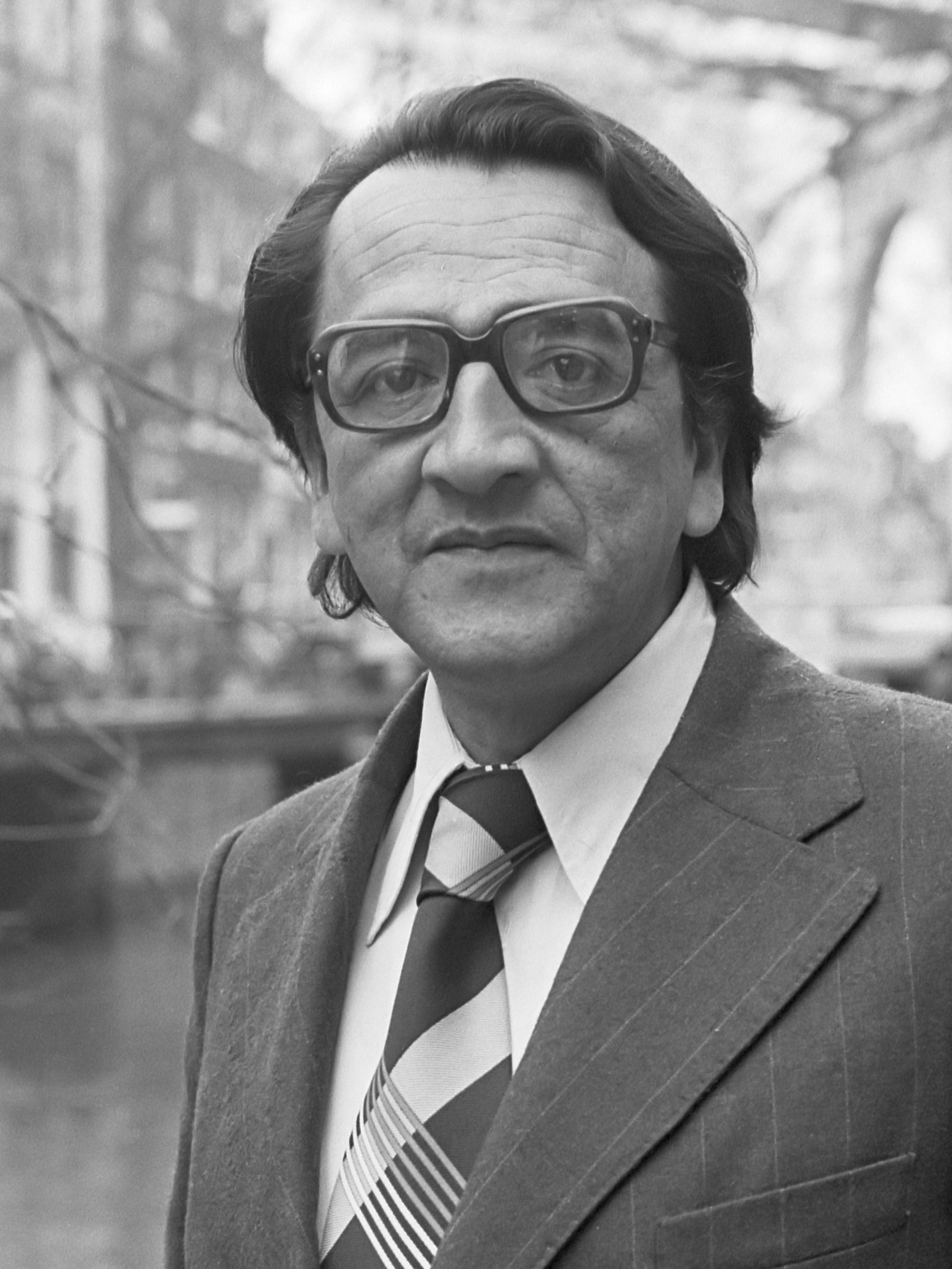
Nominee	Alan García	Alfonso Barrantes
Party	APRA	United Left
Running mate	Luis Alberto Sánchez; Luis Alva Castro	Enrique Bernales Ballesteros; Agustín Haya de la Torre
Popular vote	3,457,030	1,606,914
Percentage	53.11%	24.69%
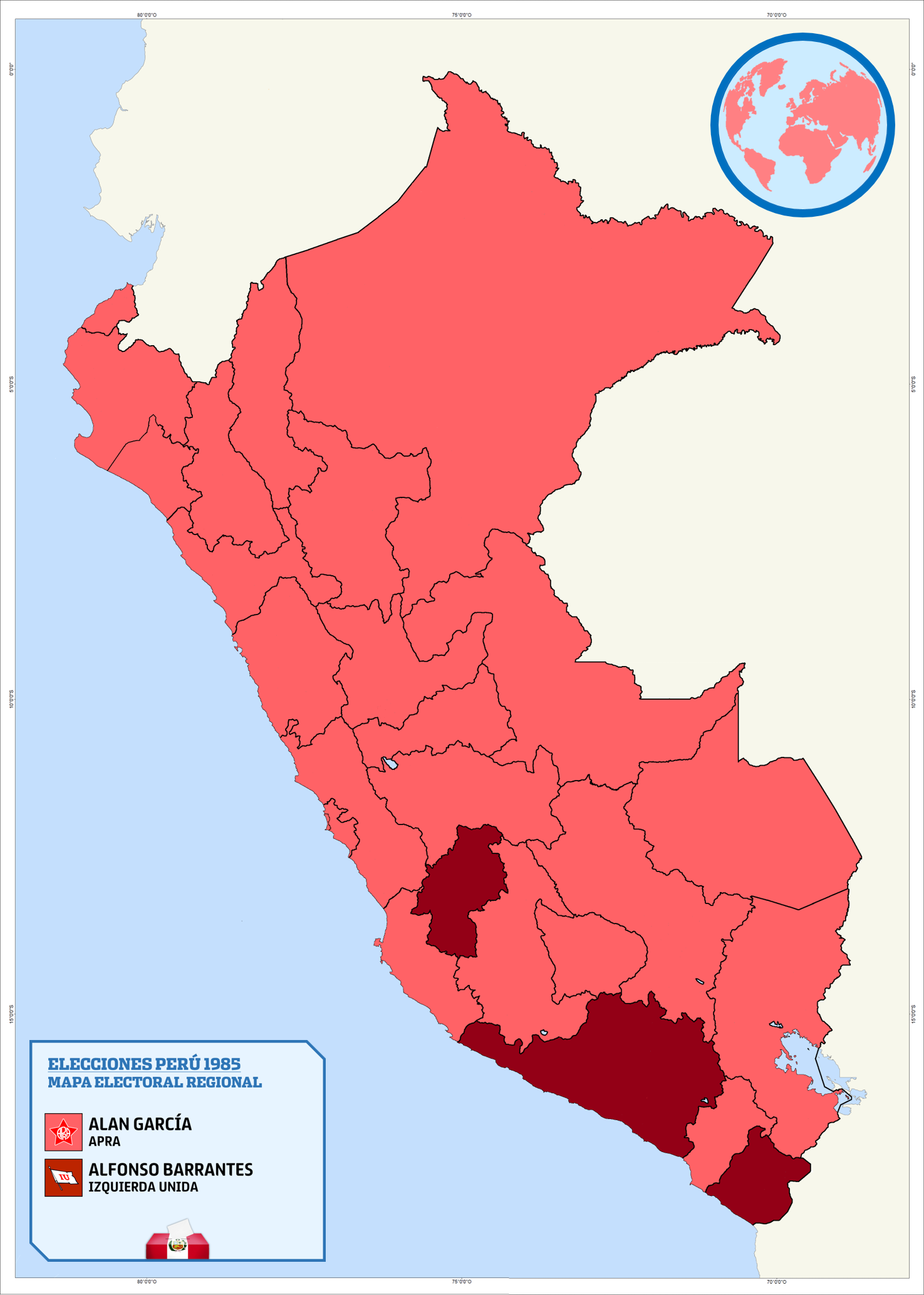
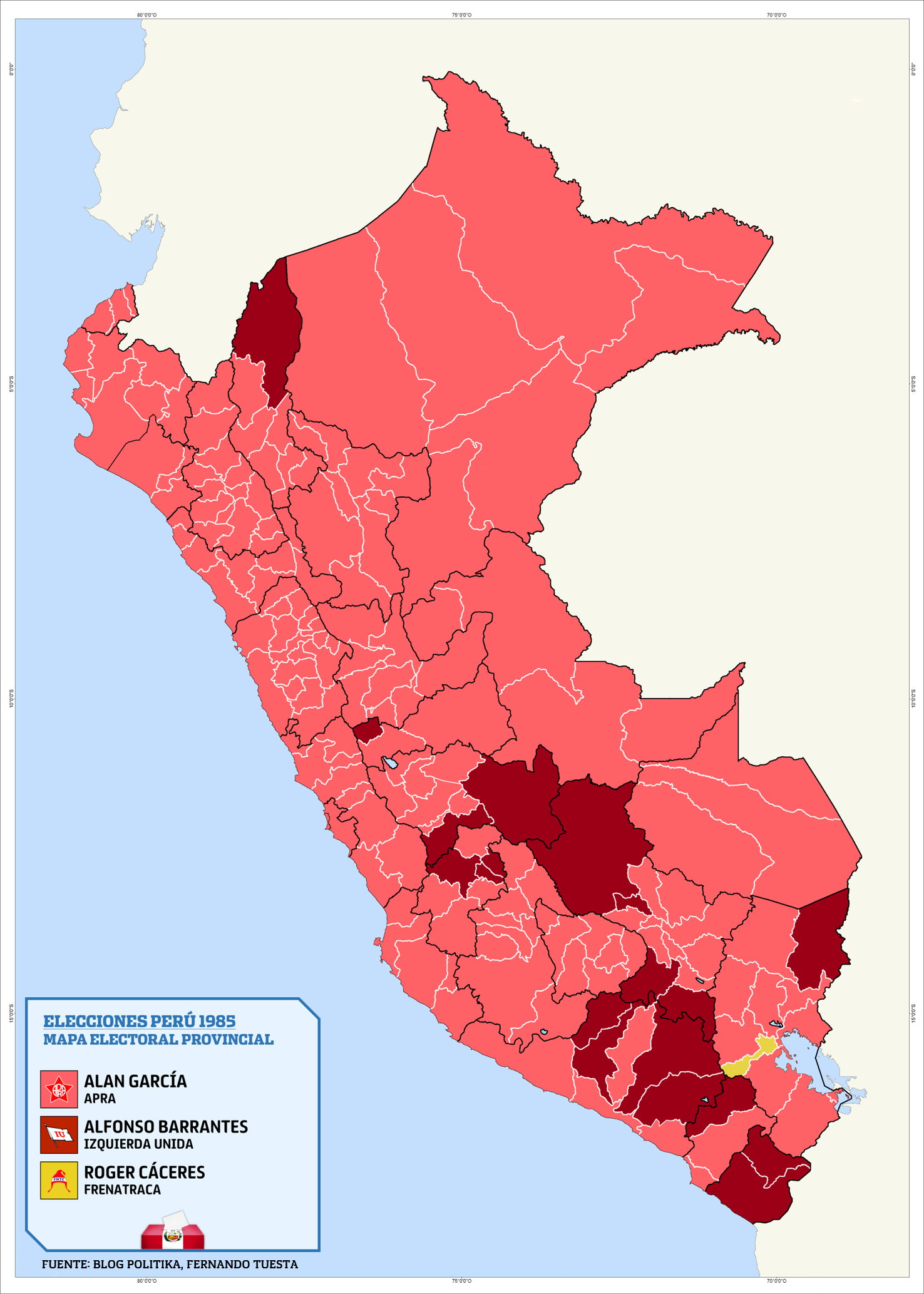
- Results by department (left) and province (right)
President before election
Fernando Belaúnde Terry
Popular Action
Elected President
Alan García
APRA
- Congressional election
Party	Leader	Vote %	Seats	+/–
Senate
APRA	Alan García	51.28	32	+14
United Left	Alfonso Barrantes	25.17	15	+6
Dem. Convergence	Luis Bedoya Reyes	11.18	7	+1
Popular Action	Fernando Belaúnde	8.14	5	−21
National Left	Roger Cáceres	1.72	1	0
Chamber of Deputies
APRA	Alan García	50.09	107	+49
United Left	Alfonso Barrantes	24.44	48	+38
Dem. Convergence	Luis Bedoya Reyes	11.14	12	+2
Popular Action	Fernando Belaúnde	8.43	10	−88
National Left	Roger Cáceres	1.90	1	−3
Independents	N/A	1.70	2	+2
This lists parties that won seats. See the complete results below.

General elections were held in Peru on 14 April 1985 to elect the President and both houses of the Congress. Alan García of the American Popular Revolutionary Alliance (APRA) won the presidential election with 53.1% of the vote, whilst his party gained a majority in both houses of Congress. It was the first time that an APRA candidate won the presidential election.

The election took place amid economic hardship.

== Results ==
=== President ===
Candidate	Party	Votes	%
Alan García	American Popular Revolutionary Alliance	3,457,030	53.11
Alfonso Barrantes Lingán	United Left	1,606,914	24.69
Luis Bedoya Reyes	Democratic Convergence	773,705	11.89
Javier Alva Orlandini	Popular Action	472,627	7.26
Roger Cáceres Velásquez	National Left	91,986	1.41
Francisco Morales Bermúdez	Democratic Front of National Unity	54,560	0.84
Jorge Campos Arredondo	National Progressive Party	26,757	0.41
Carlos Enrique Fernández Chacón	Socialist Workers Party	15,607	0.24
Peter Uculmana	National Movement Party 7 June	10,020	0.15
Total		6,509,206	100.00
Valid votes		6,509,206	86.13
Invalid/blank votes		1,047,976	13.87
Total votes		7,557,182	100.00
Registered voters/turnout		8,341,734	90.59
Source: JNE

=== Senate ===
Former President Terry was appointed a Senator for life after the end of his presidential term. He represented Popular Action. Within the APRA–DC–SODE coalition, the American Popular Revolutionary Alliance won 30 seats and the Christian Democrat Party and Solidarity and Democracy one each.

Party	Votes	%	Seats	+/–
APRA–DC–SODE	3,099,795	51.28	32	+14
United Left	1,521,461	25.17	15	+6
Democratic Convergence	675,621	11.18	7	+1
Popular Action	492,056	8.14	5	–21
National Left	103,874	1.72	1	0
Democratic Front of National Unity	56,859	0.94	0	New
National Progressive Party	25,843	0.43	0	New
Frente Agrícola Humanista Femenino	17,540	0.29	0	New
Socialist Workers Party	16,113	0.27	0	New
National Movement Party 7 June	15,126	0.25	0	New
Socialist Party of Peru	12,991	0.21	0	0
Mariateguista Party for National Liberation	7,359	0.12	0	New
Former presidents			1	New
Total	6,044,638	100.00	61	+1
Valid votes	6,044,638	83.87		
Invalid/blank votes	1,162,305	16.13		
Total votes	7,206,943	100.00		
Registered voters/turnout	8,282,545	87.01		
Source: Nohlen

=== Chamber of Deputies ===
Party	Votes	%	Seats	+/–
American Popular Revolutionary Alliance	2,920,605	50.09	107	+49
United Left	1,424,981	24.44	48	+38
Democratic Convergence	649,404	11.14	12	+10
Popular Action	491,581	8.43	10	–88
National Left	110,695	1.90	1	–3
Democratic Front of National Unity	59,455	1.02	0	New
National Movement Party 7 June	24,466	0.42	0	New
National Progressive Party	19,131	0.33	0	New
Socialist Workers Party	16,425	0.28	0	New
Socialist Party of Peru	14,775	0.25	0	0
Independents	99,192	1.70	2	+2
Total	5,830,710	100.00	180	0
Valid votes	5,830,710	88.23		
Invalid/blank votes	777,823	11.77		
Total votes	6,608,533	100.00		
Registered voters/turnout	8,282,545	79.79		
Source: Nohlen
