= Evangelical Association of the Israelite Mission of the New Universal Covenant =

Religious organization in Peru

- Classification: Messianic Judeo-Christian synthetic religion
- Scripture: primarily Old Testament
- Leader: Jonás Ataucusi Molina
- Region: Peru
- Language: primarily Spanish in worship, sometimes also Quechua
- Founder: Ezequiel Ataucusi Gamonal
- Origin: 1968
- Members: est. 200,000 (2000)

The Evangelical Association of the Israelite Mission of the New Universal Covenant (Spanish: Asociación Evangélica de la Misión Israelita del Nuevo Pacto Universal, AEMINPU) or Israelites of the New Universal Pact (Misión Israelita del Nuevo Pacto Universal) is a religious movement in Peru, commonly known as Los Israelitas (a term usually used for mainstream Judaism). Members adhere to strict interpretation of the Old Testament. It was founded in 1968 by Ezequiel Ataucusi Gamonal, whom followers believe to be a prophet and messiah.

== History ==
Ezequiel Ataucusi Gamonal founded the religious movement on 27 October 1968. The sect was founded in the Junin province following a break with the Seventh Day Adventist Church of which he and his followers had been members.

According to Ataucusi, he was chosen by God to create a new Israel in the Amazon rainforest as a punishment of the Israeli people for their losing faith. Originally a Roman Catholic, Atacusi later converted to the Seventh-day Adventist Church, from which he was expelled after declaring himself a prophet. One year after its founding, it was recognized by the Peruvian government.

By 1986 the movement had established Biblical training centers (Centros de Capacitación Bíblica or CECABI) in every province of Peru.

Described as being a political movement as well as a religious one from its inception, on 30 September 1989 Ataucusi founded the Agricultural People's Front of Peru (Spanish: Frente Popular Agrícola del Perú or FREPAP).

After Ataucusi's death from kidney failure in 2000, many of his followers believed that he would be resurrected after three days, similar to the resurrection of Jesus. However, after Ataucusi was not resurrected, some of his followers became disappointed and many left the movement. His son Jonas succeeded him as the leader.

== Ideology ==
The movement has been described as being syncretic in nature, combining Jewish and Adventist theology with Inca mysticism and spirituality together with a Maoist view on politics and economics.

During his lifetime Atacusi gradually diminished the spiritual importance of Jesus Christ in the religion and elevated his own. The Guardian described him as "a self-styled spiritual leader who called himself the 'Christ of the west'". The movement has also had strong apocalyptic beliefs, as Ataucusi would often state that the end of the world was nearing and would preach that he had personally delayed such end-of-the-world events.

Members of the Evangelical Association of the Israelite Mission of the New Universal Covenant adhere to strict interpretation of the Old Testament, and observe the Shabbat, ceasing all secular actives such as business or sports from sunset on Friday to sunset on Saturday. In addition to following the dress code prescribed in the Bible, they also believe in the separation of sexes, including at religious services. They also believe in offering animal sacrifices in their religious ceremonies. Similar to other followers of Incan spirituality, many ascribe mystical qualities to the coca plant, although members may not smoke tobacco or drink alcohol.

== Membership ==
In the 1991 book The sects in Peru, theologian and researcher José Luis Pérez Guadalupe estimated that in 1967 at its founding the movement only had about 180 faithful. The following year, however, the community had rapidly grown to around a thousand members, and by 1980, it was estimated to have around 30,000. At time of Ataucusi's death in 2000 it was estimated that there were more than 200,000 followers.

Anthropologist David Hidalgo gives several possible factors of the movement's rapid growth: many Peruvians were attracted by the movement's emphasis on communal living and strong community life at a time of social unrest. In addition many indigenous Peruvians who were disappointed with their churches were attracted to the movement's emphasis on Incan spirituality. Poor Peruvians who were attracted to Communism but were dismayed by the Shining Path's violent methods also were attracted to Ataucusi's more pacifist message.

Gamonal's son Jonas runs the group in 2023.

== Attire ==
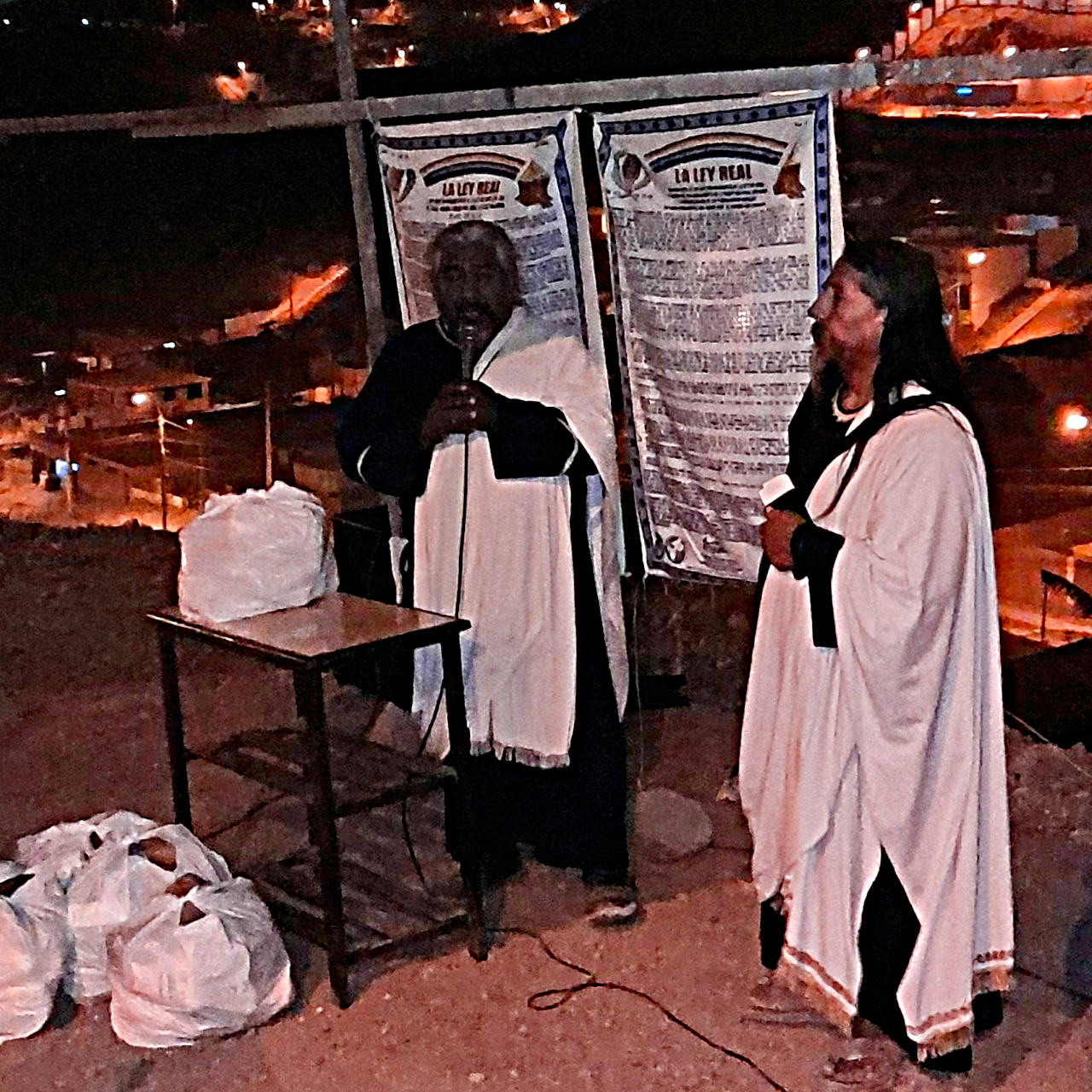
AEMINPU men in Jicamarca, 2025.

The followers of the Evangelical Association of the Israelite Mission of the New Universal Covenant are easily distinguished from members of other religions in Peru due to their unique attire. Men do not shave or cut their hair and traditionally grow their beards long. Women cover their hair, even in non-religious settings, and wear modest long sleeved clothing.

== Politics ==
The group also runs its own political party, the Agricultural People's Front of Peru, which won the second largest share of the quick count vote in the 2020 elections.

== Controversies ==
Ataucusi was known to have multiple wives, and was accused of sexually molesting young girls. The group has also been accused of promoting homophobia due to its literal interpretation of the bible, with one member claiming that LGBT people had "evil embedded in their hearts and their blood".

The group has been linked to deforestation and drug-trafficking in the past.

== See also ==
- Alto Monte de Israel, Peru
