= Democratic Front of National Unity =

Political party in Peru

Democratic Front of National Unity (in Spanish: Frente Democrático de Unidad Nacional), was a political party in Peru founded in 1984 in order to launch the presidential campaign of the ex-president Francisco Morales Bermúdez.

Morales Bermúdez finished in sixth place in the 1985 election with under 1 percent of the vote.
