= Agricultural People's Front of Peru =

Political party in Peru

Agricultural People's Front of Peru Frente Popular Agrícola del Perú
- Abbreviation: FREPAP
- Leader: Jonás Ataucusi
- Founder: Ezequiel Ataucusi Gamonal
- Founded: 30 September 1989
- Headquarters: Santiago de Surco, Lima
- Membership (2020): 42,083
- Ideology: Agrarianism; Christian fundamentalism Peruvian nationalism Social conservatism Socialism; Theocracy
- Political position: Syncretic
- Religion: Nondenominational evangelicalism (indirectly connected to the Evangelical Association of the Israelite Mission of the New Universal Covenant)
- Congress: 0 / 130
- Governorships: 0 / 25
- Regional Councillors: 0 / 274
- Province Mayorships: 0 / 196
- District Mayorships: 0 / 1,874

Website
- www.frepap.org.pe

The Agricultural People's Front of Peru (Spanish: Frente Popular Agrícola del Perú; FREPAP) is an agrarian political party in Peru, founded in 1989 by Ezequiel Ataucusi Gamonal. The party had 42,083 members in 2020.

== History ==
Ezequiel Ataucusi Gamonal created the Evangelical Association of the Israelite Mission of the New Universal Covenant (Asociación Evangélica de la Misión Israelita del Nuevo Pacto Universal or AEMINPU) in 1968, with The Guardian stating, "The messianic sect behind the party was founded in 1968 by Ezequiel Ataucusi, a self-styled spiritual leader who called himself the 'Christ of the west'". Followers of the movement regard Ezequiel Ataucusi Gamonal as a prophet and "the reincarnation of the Holy Spirit". The Agricultural People's Front of Peru party was officially founded by Ataucusi on 30 September 1989.

In 1995, the party received one seat in the Congress of the Republic of Peru, which was held by Javier Noriega Febres. Noriega was later accused of being the head of a hitmen group by the government of Alberto Fujimori.

The party was elected into two seats during the 2000 general election. The two seats, which were for Luis Cáceres Velásquez and his son Roger Cáceres Pérez, characters who joined the ranks of Fujimorism (Peru 2000) after receiving money from Presidential Advisor and Intelligence Chief Vladimiro Montesinos. Ataucusi died in 2000 and was placed in a glass coffin, with followers expecting his resurrection. Since the death of Ataucusi, the party experienced internal conflict. In the 2000s, the party won minor district and regional elections. The party lost its legal registration in 2010 and regained it in 2015.

In the 2020 Peruvian parliamentary election, the party received multiple seats in the Congress for the first time in nearly two decades.

== Ideology ==
FREPAP calls for a strict adherence to the Ten Commandments and the decentralization of populated cities by forming agrarian communities. The party and its main religious organization AEMINPU have been described as having socialist traits in economic matters, while being heavily conservative on social matters.

They list their ideology as the following:

- Theocratic – The recognition of divine law to confront corruption and to promote noble politicians
- Nationalist – Defending of Peru's identity, culture and natural resources
- Tahuantinsuyonism – Promoting the organization and moral ethics of the Inca Empire
- Revolution – Moving those experiencing misery within Peru towards a path of liberty and self-reliance
- Agrarianism – The promotion of agriculture as a way to improve the socioeconomic standards of Peru in every dimension
- Integration – Unifying all Peruvians to benefit the nation

== Policy ==
The party calls for the elimination of extreme poverty through the promotion of agricultural industry and decentralization, which they believe will improve socioeconomic standards. For macroeconomic policies, FREPAP believes tourism should be secondary to agriculture and that science and technology should be promoted to develop human capital in order to replace Peru's commodity-driven economy, strengthening the competitiveness of the nation. Regarding the environment, FREPAP calls for the use of renewable energy and the protection of Peru's biodiversity. FREPAP believes that the Peruvian government needs to focus on transparency, accountability and preventing corruption, and has advocated in favor of repealing parliamentary immunity.

== Election results ==
=== Presidential elections ===
| Year | Candidate | Party | Votes | Percentage | Outcome |
|---|---|---|---|---|---|
| 1990 | Ezequiel Ataucusi Gamonal | Agricultural People's Front of Peru | 73,974 | 1.11 | 7th |
| 1995 | Ezequiel Ataucusi Gamonal | Agricultural People's Front of Peru | 57,556 | 0.77 | 7th |
| 2000 | Ezequiel Ataucusi Gamonal | Agricultural People's Front of Peru | 80,106 | 0.72 | 7th |

=== Unicameral Congress of the Republic ===
| Election | Votes | % | Number of seats | ▲/▼ | Position |
|---|---|---|---|---|---|
| 1995 | 46,102 | 1.1% | 1 / 120 | ▲1 | Opposition |
| 2000 | 216,953 | 2.2% | 2 / 120 | ▲1 | Opposition |
| 2001 | 156,264 | 1.7% | 0 / 120 | ▼2 | Extra-parliamentary |
| 2006 | 85,019 | 0.8% | 0 / 120 | 0 | Extra-parliamentary |
| 2020 | 1,240,084 | 8.4% | 15 / 130 | ▲15 | Opposition |
| 2021 | 588,999 | 4.6% | 0 / 130 | ▼15 | Extra-parliamentary |
| 2026 | 272,759 | 1.9% | 0 / 130 | 0 | Extra-parliamentary |

==== Chamber of Deputies ====
| Election | Leader | Votes | % | Seats | +/– | Rank | Government |
|---|---|---|---|---|---|---|---|
| 1990 | | 63,450 | 1.22% | 0 / 180 | New | ▲8th | Extra-parliamentary |
Unicameral Congress between 1995 and 2026
| 2026 | Jonás Ataucusi | 272,759 | 1.89 | 0 / 130 | New | ▲12th | Extra-parliamentary |

==== Senate ====
| Election | Leader | Votes | % | Seats | +/– | Rank | Government |
|---|---|---|---|---|---|---|---|
| 1990 | | 63,879 | 1.15% | 0 / 60 | New | ▲7th | Extra-parliamentary |
Unicameral Congress between 1995 and 2026
| 2026 | Jonás Ataucusi | 231,172 | 1.56 | 0 / 60 | | ▲14th | Extra-parliamentary |

== Reception ==
FREPAP's parent organization has been recognized as a cult by some media commentators and scholars. According to Francisco Toro of the Group of Fifty, FREPAP is "a party based on a messianic cult".

According to Peruvian anthropologist Carlos Ráez Suárez, FREPAP saw success in the 2020 Peruvian parliamentary election due to its logistics, its policy proposals for rural supporters and as a protest vote for urban voters. Anthropology professor of the Pontifical Catholic University of Peru, María Eugenia Ulfe, stated that the elections "punished traditional parties with strong links to corruption and little regional presence" and some Peruvians skeptical about corrupt politicians "think a person with a religious vocation is not going to rob you or be corrupt".

== See also ==
- Israelites of the New Universal Pact
- Alto Monte de Israel, Peru
- Evangelical political parties in Latin America
