= Left Socialist Accord =

Left Socialist Accord Acuerdo Socialista de Izquierda
- Abbreviation: ASI
- Founded: 1989
- Dissolved: Post-1989?
- Split from: IU
- Succeeded by: IS
- Ideology: Socialism; Factions: Communism; Alvaradism
- Political position: Left-wing to far-left
- National affiliation: PSR; PCR; MSP

Left Socialist Accord (in Spanish: Acuerdo Socialista de Izquierda), was a political alliance in Peru founded in 1989 by three groups that left IU: Revolutionary Socialist Party (PSR), Revolutionary Communist Party (PCR) and Peruvian Socialist Movement (MSP). ASI contested the 1989 municipal elections. They also contested the 1990 Peruvian general election. Later ASI was dissolved.
