= Independent Civic Union =

Peruvian political party

The Independent Civic Union (in Spanish: Unión Cívica Independiente), was a political party in Peru founded in 1988 by Francisco Diez Canseco Távara and César Larrabure. The UCI only contested the parliamentary elections of 1990, where it gained no seats.
