= Luis Solari =

Peruvian politician

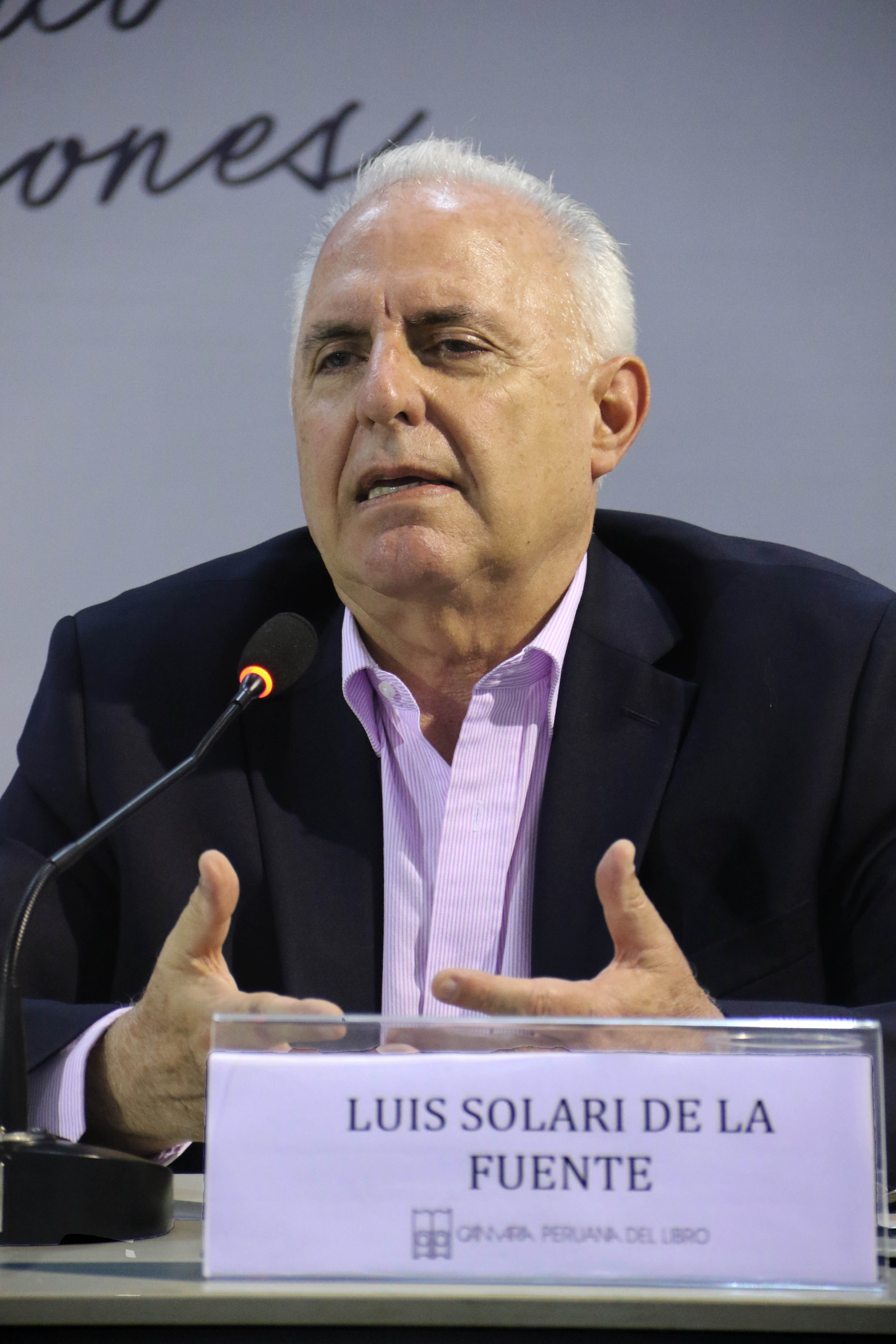

Prime Minister of Peru
- In office 28 July 2001 – 11 July 2002
- President: Alejandro Toledo
- Preceded by: Roberto Dañino
- Succeeded by: Beatriz Merino

Member of Congress
- In office 26 July 2001 – 26 July 2006
- Constituency: Lima
- In office 26 July 2000 – 26 July 2001
- Constituency: National

Personal details
- Born: Luis María Santiago Eduardo Solari de la Fuente; 28 January 1948 (age 78) Lima, Peru
- Party: National Solidarity
- Other political affiliations: Possible Peru

Luis María Santiago Eduardo Solari de la Fuente (born 28 January 1948) is a Peruvian politician of Italian descent and a founding member of Possible Peru. He has served as Health Minister and studied internal medicine at the National University of San Marcos. He gained notice in his work for Catholic Church in Peru and received the title commander from the Holy See in 1997. He also belongs to Sodalicio de Vida Cristiana. This relates to his time as Health Minister in that he opposed abortion and introduced a Day of the Unborn. He is also a former Prime Minister of Peru. He would later switch to the National Solidarity Party.

== Biography ==
He was born on 28 January 1948, the son of the Peruvian Army Brigadier General Luis Andrés Avelino Solari Hurtado (a native of Moquegua, Peru) and María Carolina de la Fuente Bar (a native of Lima, Peru).

Luis Solari's family has a political history: his grandfather, Giacomo Solari Simonetti, had to leave Italy because he was a supporter of Giuseppe Garibaldi; it had a prominent role in the Italian community of Moquegua and Tacna in the 19th century. His uncle, Dr. Humberto Solari Hurtado, was a Deputy for Moquegua. His father, Luis Solari Hurtado was aide-de-camp to Presidents Luis Miguel Sánchez Cerro and Oscar R. Benavides Larrea, as well as Head of the Military House of President Manuel Prado Ugarteche (first term); Director of the Superior War College from 1946 to 1954. General Manuel A. Odría, de facto president since 1948, kept him in that position for unusual eight years and in 1954 he did not promote him to Major General (as appropriate) and sent him to the "golden exile" as Ambassador of Peru in France. His first cousin, Jorge Fernández-Maldonado Solari was Major General of the Peruvian Army, General Commander of the Army, Minister of War, President of the Council of Ministers, Minister of Energy and Mines, and Senator of the Republic. His brother, Martín Solari de la Fuente was General of the National Police of Peru (PNP), Director of Health of the National Police of Peru, Vice Minister of the Ministry of the Interior and Secretary General of the same Ministry.

He studied with the Jesuits at the College of the Immaculate in Lima and at the École Saint Louis de Gonzague in Paris while his father was Ambassador of Peru in France. He graduated as a Surgeon from the Universidad Mayor de San Marcos and graduated as a Specialist in Internal Medicine from the same University.

He followed a Diploma in Strategic Political Analysis from the Universidad Iberoamericana de México.

== Political career ==
In 1994 he was co-founder of the Possible Peru party with former President Alejandro Toledo. He was Secretary General of the aforementioned party in 1995 and also from September 1999 to April 2002. As such he participated in the process of the fall of the dictatorship of Fujimori. He had to lead the party's organization during its growth phase: in 1999 it had 100 committees; At the time of winning the elections in 2001, it had about 1,000 committees and a National Congress in which the majority of the votes was in the hands of the provincial secretaries.

=== Congressman ===
He was elected as a Congressman in the 2000 general elections. In such condition and being Secretary General of the party, he participated in the Dialogue Table of the Organization of American States - OAS, a table between the democratic parties, the dictatorial government and society. civil. After that experience, he was one of the promoters of the Inter-American Forum on Political Parties (OAS), of the Table of Political Parties during the government of President Valentín Paniagua and of the National Agreement, whose sessions he presided over while he was President of the Council of Ministers in the government of President Alejandro Toledo.

He was a candidate of the democratic parties for the Presidency of Congress in 2000. In September of that year, the video was revealed that showed how the government had bought congressmen for money to obtain parliamentary votes. After the fall of Fujimori, he was re-elected as a congressman in the 2001 general elections.

In 2001, as President of the Government Transfer Commission, he had to lead the process of transferring the transitional government of President Valentín Paniagua to the elected government of President Alejandro Toledo, representing the latter.

In September 2004, due to serious differences with the leadership of the party and the government, he resigned from the party and the parliamentary group. Together with an important group of Peruvians, he founded the Unidos Progresamos party in 2005.

In Congress he was president of the Economic Commission as well as a member of the commissions of Constitution, Regulation and Constitutional Accusations, Foreign Relations, Code Reform, Health, Population and Family and Women and Human Development.

Political offices
Preceded by Roberto Dañino	Prime Minister of Peru; 2002 – 2003	Succeeded by Beatriz Merino
