= Juan Perry =

Peruvian politician

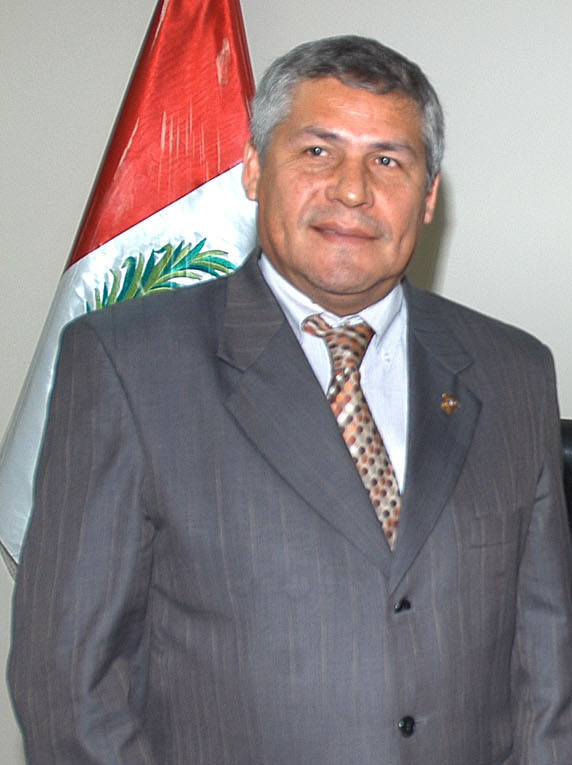
- Former Congressman Juan Perry

Member of Congress
- In office 26 July 2006 – 25 July 2011
- Preceded by: Eduardo Salhuana
- Succeeded by: Amado Romero
- Constituency: Madre de Dios

Personal details
- Born: Juan David Perry Cruz; 29 December 1957 (age 68)
- Party: Independent (2017-present)
- Other political affiliations: National Solidarity (2010-2017); National Restoration (2007-2010); Democratic Force (2004-2007)
- Profession: Politician

Juan David Perry Cruz (born 29 December 1957) is a Peruvian politician and a former Congressman, elected in the 2006 general elections, representing the Madre de Dios region for the 2006–2011 term. Perry belongs to the National Restoration party but later switched to the National Solidarity. He lost his seat in the 2011 general election when he ran for re-election under the National Solidarity Alliance of former Lima Mayor Luis Castañeda, but he attained a low number of votes.
