= Liberty Movement =

Liberty Movement Movimiento de la Libertad
- Abbreviation: ML
- Founded: 2 August 1987
- Dissolved: 6 September 1993
- Ideology: Classical liberalism; Neoliberalism
- Political position: Centre-right
- National affiliation: FREDEMO

Liberty Movement (Spanish: Movimiento Libertad) was a centre-right classical liberal political party in Peru. It was founded in 1987 by people who opposed decrees such as the nationalization of the banking sector in 1986 under the first presidency of Alan García, including Mario Vargas Llosa. Instead it advocated a free market approach to solving Peru's hyperinflation, which peaked at over 7000%.

== Notable members ==
- Pedro Cateriano
- Enrique Chirinos Soto
- Enrique Ghersi
- Beatriz Merino
- Luis Miró Quesada Garland
- Rafael Rey
- Mario Vargas Llosa
- Miguel Vega Alvear
- Ricardo Vega Llona

== Electoral history ==
=== Presidential elections ===
Year	Candidate	Party / Coalition	Votes	Percentage	Outcome
1990	Mario Vargas Llosa	Democratic Front ML-AP-PPC-SD	1st Round: 2 163 323	1st Round: 32.57	1st Round: 1st
1990	Mario Vargas Llosa	Democratic Front ML-AP-PPC-SD	2nd Round: 2 708 291	2nd Round: 37.62	2nd Round: 2nd

=== Elections to the Congress of the Republic ===
Year	Votes	%	Seats	▲/▼	Position
1990	1 492 513 (FREDEMO)	30.1% (FREDEMO)	62 / 180 (FREDEMO)	▲62	Minority

=== Elections to the Senate ===
Year	Votes	%	Seats	▲/▼	Position
1990	1 791 077 (FREDEMO)	32.3% (FREDEMO)	20 / 62 (FREDEMO)	▲19	Minority

== See also ==
- Hernando de Soto
- Lost Decade (Peru)
- Mario Vargas Llosa
- People's Liberty
