= Enrique Bernales Ballesteros =

Peruvian scholar and politician (1940–2018)

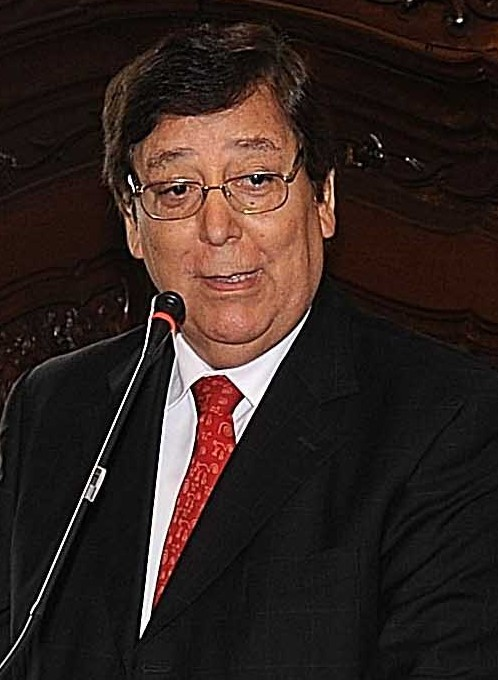

Enrique Martín Bernales Ballesteros (6 November 1940 – 24 November 2018) was a Peruvian scholar and politician. He was a member of the Peruvian Senate and the first UN Special Rapporteur on mercenaries.

Bernales Ballesteros served as Principal Professor of Social Sciences at the Pontificia Universidad Católica del Perú (PUCP). He also served as the general secretary of the Revolutionary Socialist Party (PSR).

== Childhood and academic career ==
Bernales Ballesteros was the son of Luis E. Bernales (director of Colegio Guadalupe) and Laura Ballesteros. Whilst his family was relatively wealthy, he grew up in the Barrios Altos. He went to school at Colegio La Salle for his primary and secondary education. He studied law at PUCP and Political Science at the University of Grenoble. During his three years as a student in Europe, he was molded in socialist thought. He obtained a degree in political science and a doctorate in law. In 1971 he was elected Dean of the Political Science faculty at PUCP. In 1975 he studied Methodology of Historical Investigation at universities in Paris, London and Madrid.

== Senator ==
He was elected as a senator, standing as a United Left (IU) candidate. In the 1985 election he was elected with 111,808 votes. At the time, he was called the 'Gentleman of the Peruvian Left'. He led the left-wing faction in parliament.

== Special Rapporteur ==
Between 1987 and 2004 he served as the UN Special Rapporteur on the question of the use of mercenaries. He was the first person to hold this post. In 2004 he was replaced by Shaista Shameem, who adopted a more conciliatory approach to the private security industry that Bernales Ballesteros. The post was abolished the following year. As of 1996 he was the chairman of the United Nations Human Rights Committee.

== Bibliography ==
- El Parlamento en el Perú (1968)
- Autores Políticos de la Integración Andina (1972)
- Movimientos Sociales-Movimientos Universitarios (1974)
- La Reforma Educativa y la Mecánica de la Dominación Interna (1975)
- Reforma Universitaria (1976)
- Modernización y Expansión de la Educación Universitaria (1977)
- La Universidad en el Perú: Balance y Perspectiva (1978)
- Burguesía y Estado Liberal (1979)
- Constitución y Sociedad Política (1980-1984)
- El Desarrollo de las Ciencias Sociales en el Perú (1981)
- Parlamento Sociedad y Democracia (1982)
- El Parlamento por Dentro (1992)
- Crisis Politica, solución electoral? (1980)
