= Solidarity and Democracy =

Solidarity and Democracy (Spanish: Solidaridad y Democracia) was a political party in Peru formed by a group of technocrats. SODE participated in elections on the lists of APRA in 1985, on the lists of FREDEMO in 1990, and ran alone in 1992.
