= Hayist Bases Movement =

Political party in Peru

Hayist Bases Movement Movimiento de Bases Hayistas
- Abbreviation: MBH
- Founded: 1980
- Dissolved: 1990s
- Split from: Peruvian Aprista Party

The Hayist Bases Movement (Spanish: Movimiento de Bases Hayistas,MBH) was a splinter group of Peruvian Aprista Party that was founded in 1980. Led by Andrés Townsend and Francisco Diez Canseco Távara, the party claimed to be the true heirs of Víctor Raúl Haya de la Torre's ideology, as the official party switched to a more populist agenda with the leadership of Armando Villanueva (who lost the 1980 general election to Fernando Belaúnde), and Alan García, with the latter winning the Presidency in 1985.

For the 1985 general election, Townsend and the party reached an agreement with the Christian People's Party in order to run as an alliance named Democratic Convergence. The coalition's presidential nominee, Luis Bedoya Reyes, won 11.9% of the popular vote, placing third.
