= Ezequiel Ataucusi =

Peruvian politician and prophet

Leader of the Agricultural People's Front of Peru
- In office 30 September 1989 – 21 June 2000
- Succeeded by: Jonás Ataucusi

Personal details
- Born: 10 April 1918 Huarhua, Pampamarca District, La Unión, Arequipa, Peru
- Died: 21 June 2000 (aged 82) Miraflores, Lima, Peru
- Party: Agricultural People's Front of Peru

Ezequiel Ataucusi Gamonal (10 April 1918 – 21 June 2000), also known as Brother Ezequiel, was a Peruvian politician and self-proclaimed prophet of the religious movement he founded, the Evangelical Association of the Israelite Mission of the New Universal Covenant (AEMINPU) and their theocratic party known as Agricultural People's Front of Peru (FREPAP).

== Early life ==
Ataucusi was born in 1918 in Huarhua, a village of Cotahuasi near Arequipa into a poor family. He held many jobs as a shoemaker, railroad worker, soldier and carpenter.

== Spiritual leader ==
In the 1950s while in his forties, Ataucusi experienced many issues with his life and converted from Roman Catholicism to the Seventh-day Adventist Church. While experiencing a serious illness, he reported that he visited a "third heaven" and addressed himself as a prophet, writing the Ten Commandments on a blackboard saying he was tasked with delivering the commandments for a second time. After the incident, he was removed from the Seventh-day Adventist Church, subsequently beginning to evangelize rural Peruvians in 1956.

The Evangelical Association of the Israelite Mission of the New Universal Covenant (Asociación Evangélica de la Misión Israelita del Nuevo Pacto Universal - AEMINPU) was created by Ataucusi in 1968 and the religion was officially recognized in Peru in 1969. The religion is a mix of Seventh-day Adventism, Judaism, Inca mysticism and Maoism. The founding of the church happened when many rural Peruvians faced a decline in socioeconomic standards into the 1970s. As the internal conflict in Peru intensified, followers flocked to AEMINPU.

Ataucusi preached that he was chosen by God to create a new Israel in the Amazon Rainforest as a punishment of the Israeli people for their losing faith. Followers of the movement regarded Ataucusi as a prophet and "the reincarnation of the Holy Spirit". He gradually reduced the importance of Jesus in his movement. The Guardian described him as "a self-styled spiritual leader who called himself the 'Christ of the west'". Ataucusi would often state that the apocalypse was approaching and would preach that he delayed such events. His followers were required to wear robes modeled from the Old Testament, though Ataucusi never wore them saying that he would only do so when the apocalypse occurred. Throughout this time, he had several wives and was known to be very sexually active, according to The Daily Telegraph.

His party, the Agricultural People's Front of Peru (FREPAP), was officially founded by Ataucusi on 30 September 1989. By the 1990s, his number of followers ranged from 60,000 to 200,000. In 1995, investigations were opened against Ataucusi surrounding allegations of killing disagreeing followers and supposed links to Shining Path, though none of the accusations were ever confirmed.

He was the party's candidate for president of Peru three times, for the 1990 election, 1995 election and 2000 election, though he was never elected for any political office.

== Death and legacy ==
He died in Miraflores, Lima of kidney failure and his followers held a three-day funeral, waiting for his resurrection beside his body decorated with gold jewelry. As his followers waited for his resurrection and his body began to decompose, Ataucusi's body was placed in a glass coffin. After not resurrecting, many followers became disillusioned with him.

Ataucusi's son Jonas was chosen as his successor and his party eventually grew within the Peruvian Congress following the 2020 Peruvian parliamentary election.
