= 1990 Peruvian general election =

- Presidential election
- 8 April 1990 (first round); 10 June 1990 (second round)
- Turnout: 78.27% (first round) ▼12.32pp 79.52% (second round)
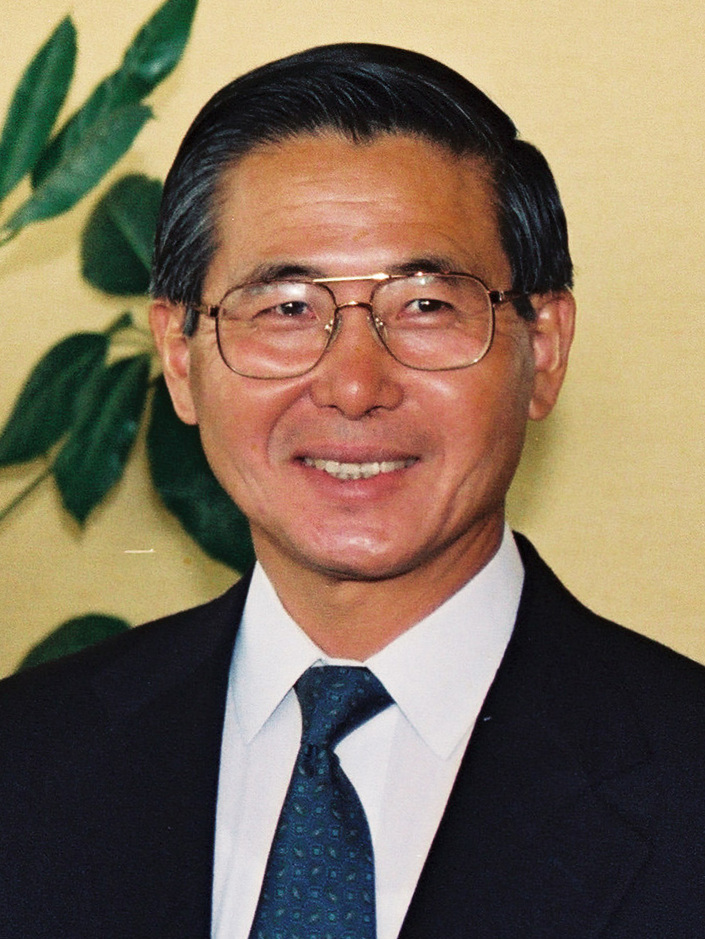

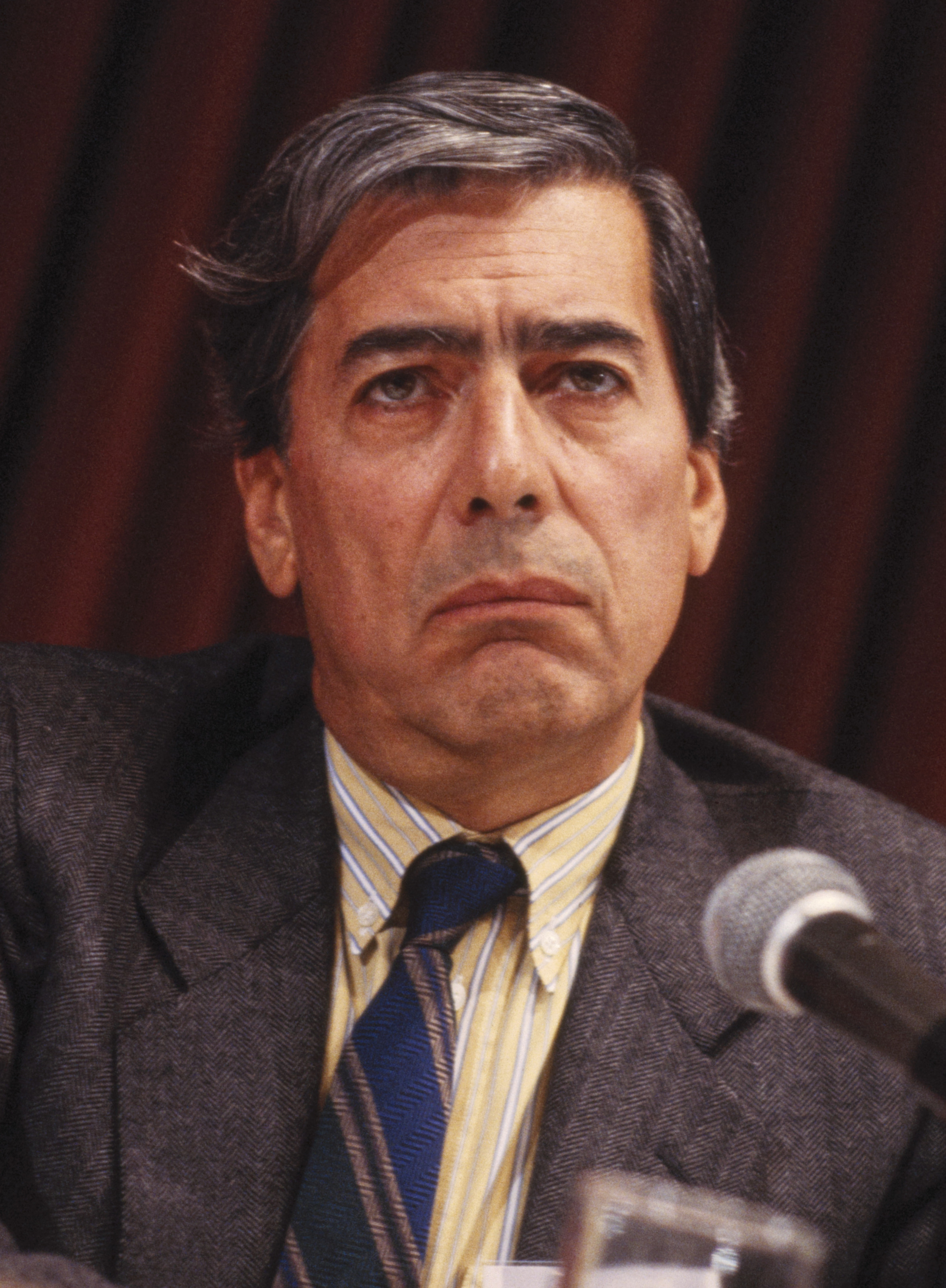
Nominee	Alberto Fujimori	Mario Vargas Llosa
Party	Cambio 90	FREDEMO
Running mate	Máximo San Román; Carlos García y García	Eduardo Orrego; Ernesto Alayza
Popular vote	4,489,897	2,708,291
Percentage	62.38%	37.62%
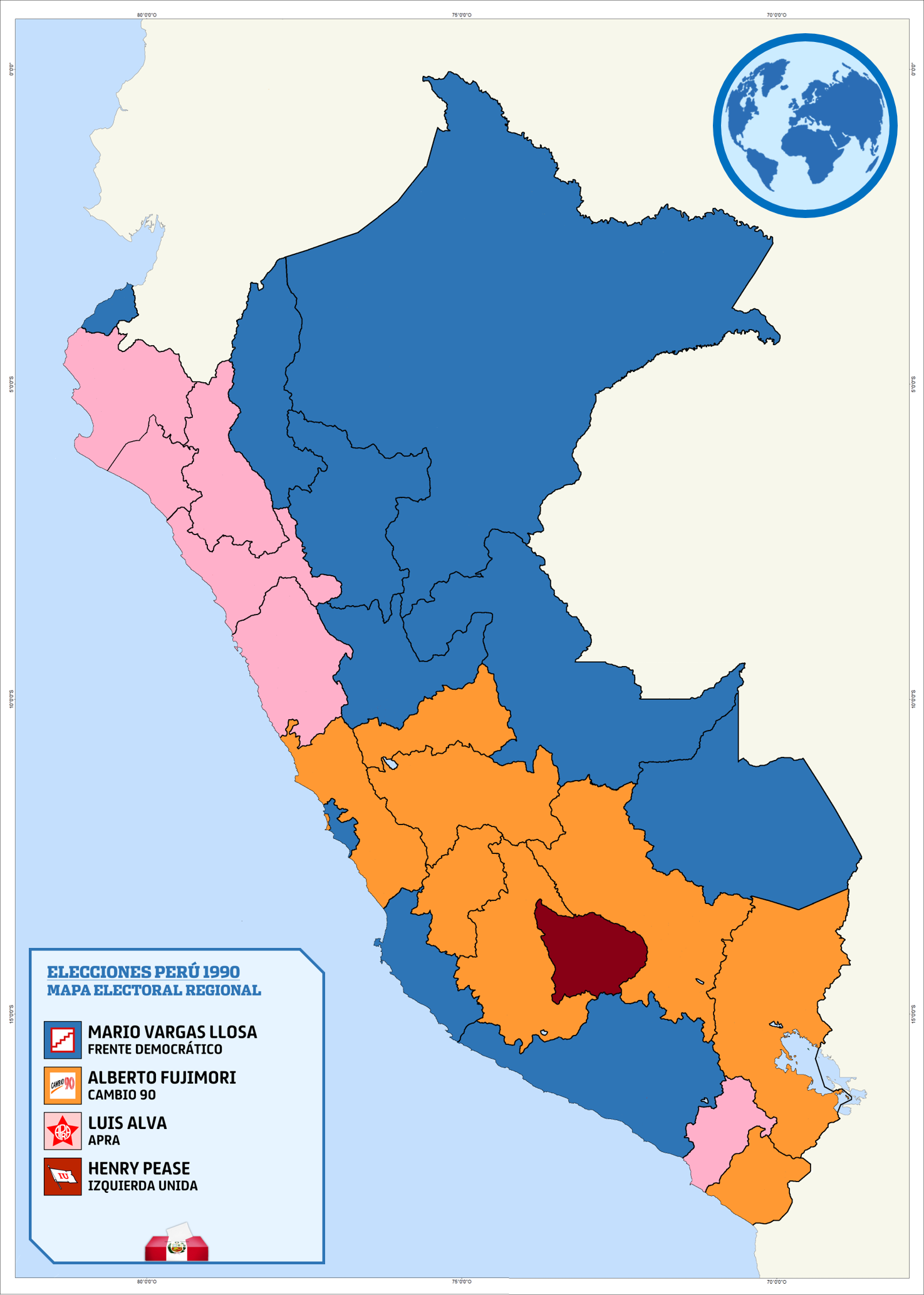
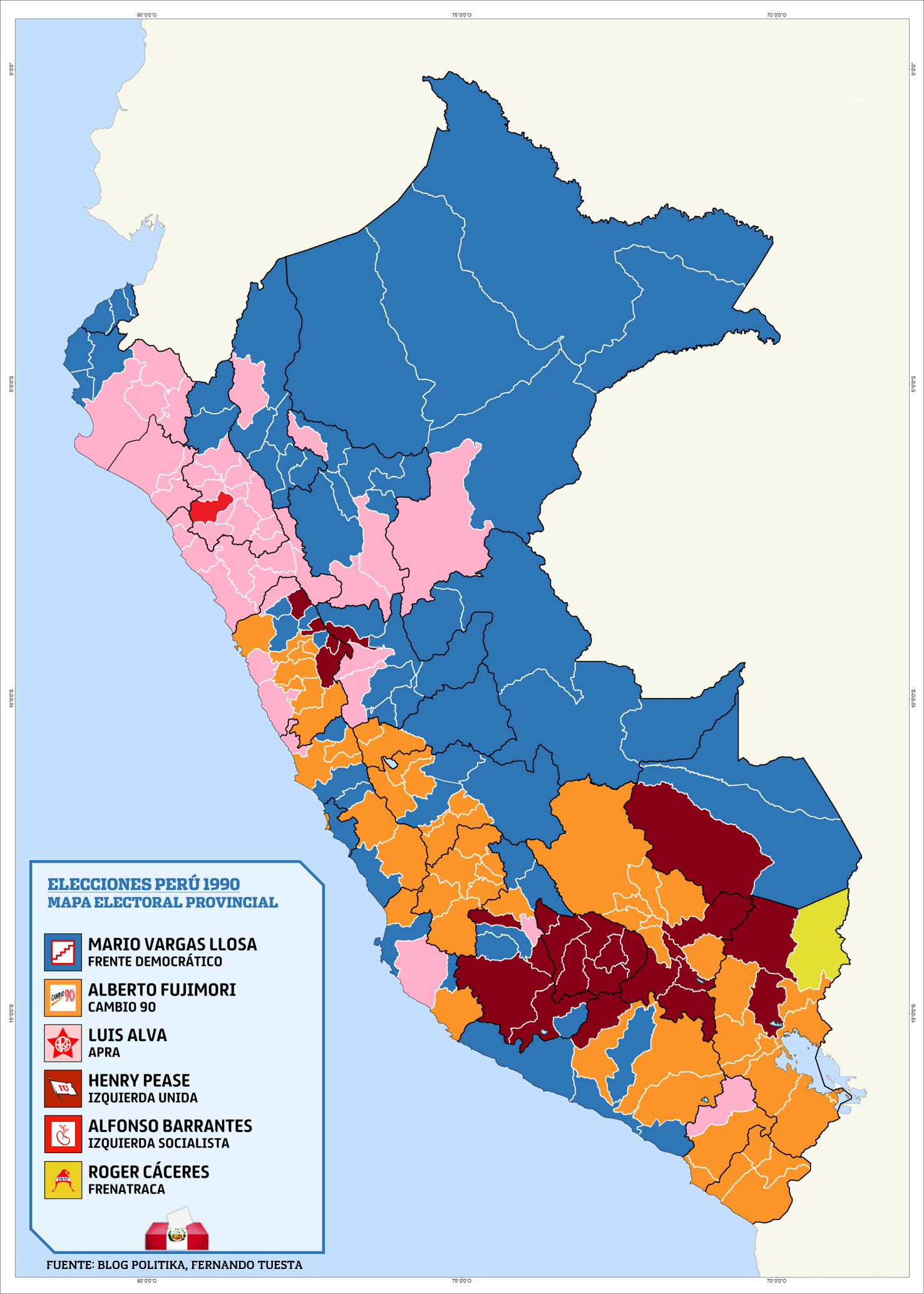
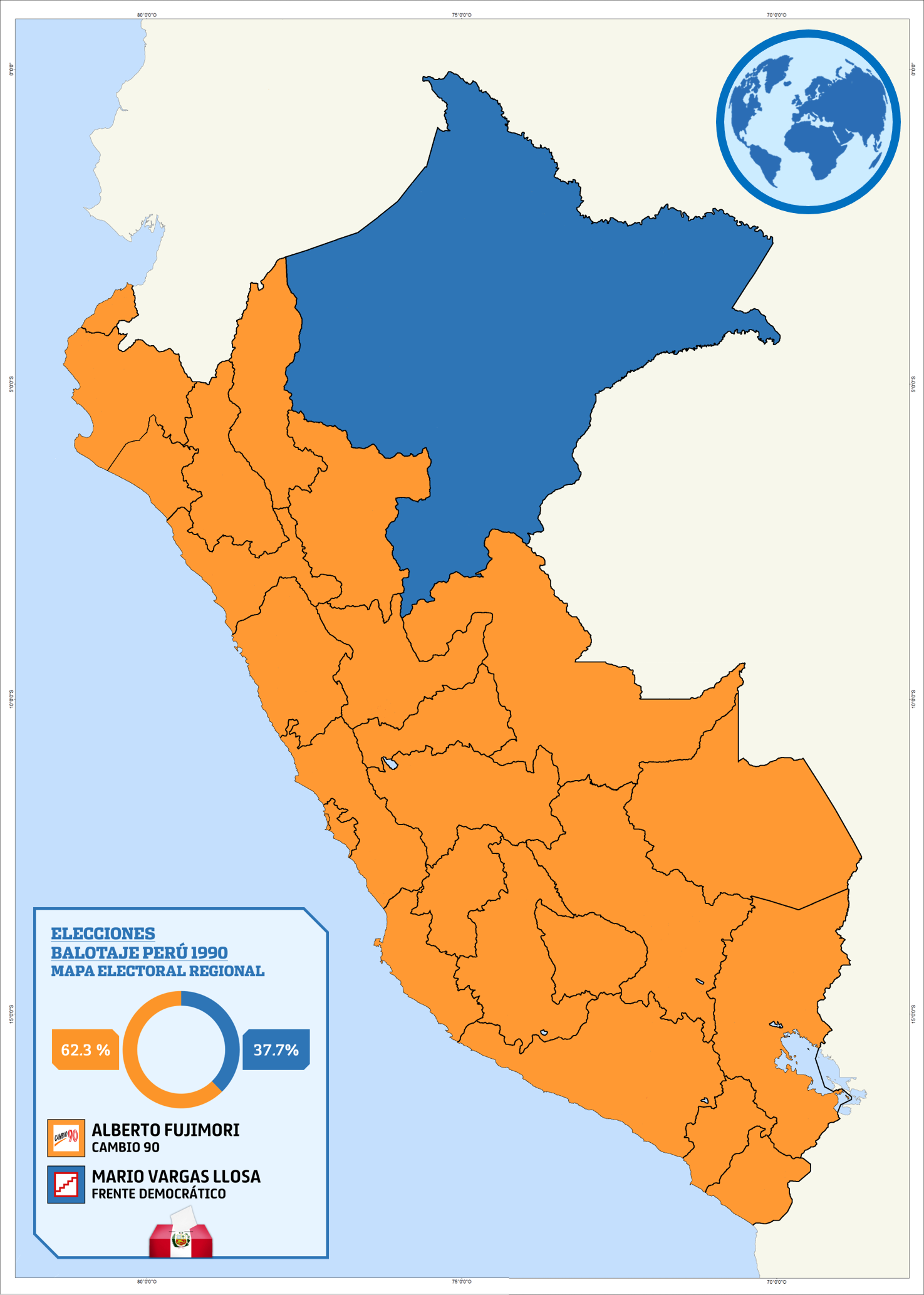
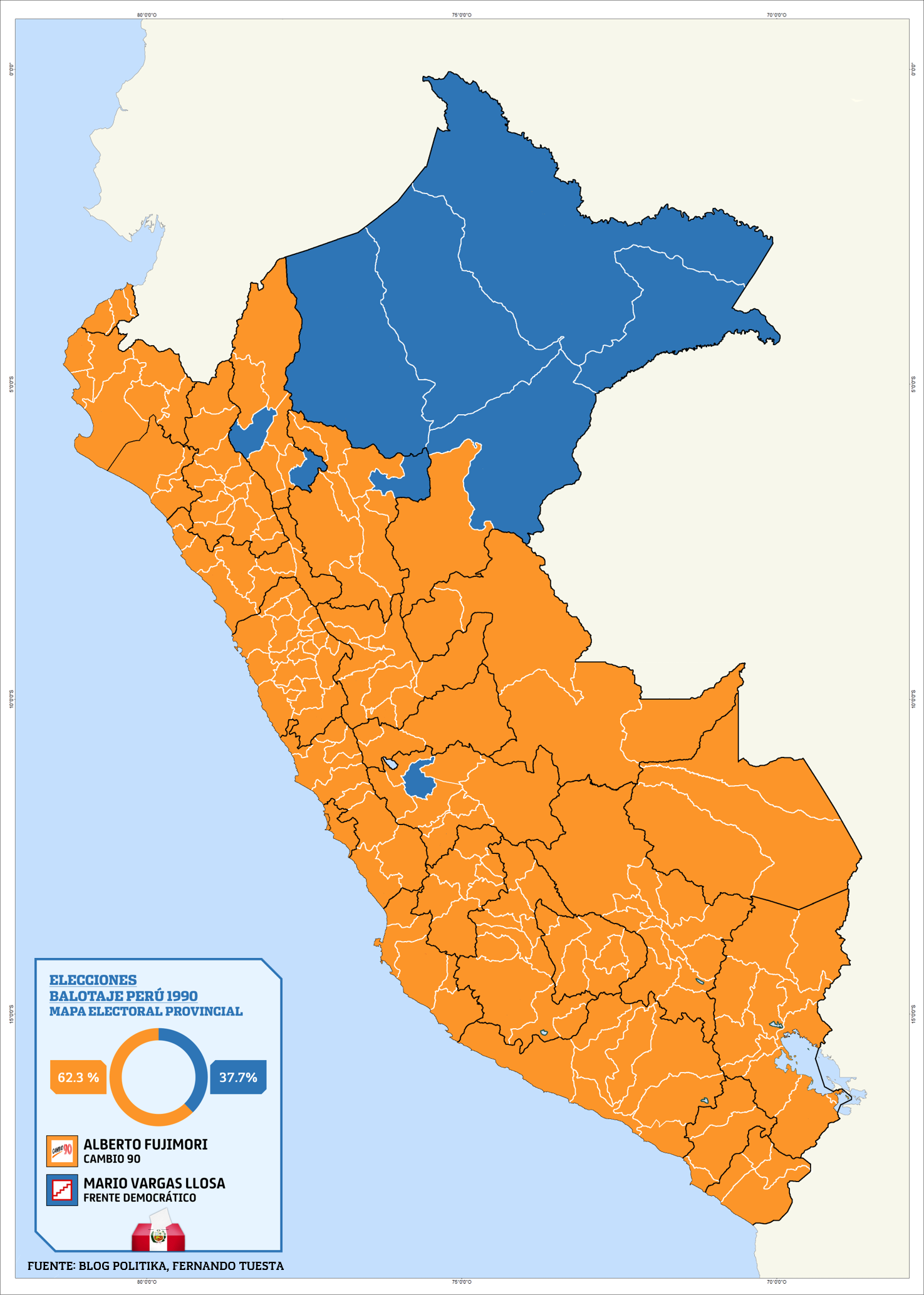
President before election
Alan García
APRA
Elected President
Alberto Fujimori
Cambio 90
- Senate
- 8 April 1990
- 60 of the 62 seats in the Senate; 32 seats needed for a majority
Party	Leader	Vote %	Seats	+/–
FREDEMO	Mario Vargas Llosa	32.06	20	+12
APRA	Alan García	25.09	16	−16
Cambio 90	Andrés Reggiardo	21.70	14	New
United Left	Henry Pease	9.77	6	−9
Socialist Left	Alfonso Barrantes	5.46	3	New
FRENATRACA	Roger Cáceres	2.03	1	0
This lists parties that won seats. See the complete results below.
- Chamber of Deputies
- 8 April 1990
- All 180 seats in the Chamber of Deputies; 90 seats needed for a majority
Party	Leader	Vote %	Seats	+/–
FREDEMO	Mario Vargas Llosa	30.03	62	+46
APRA	Alan García	24.78	53	−54
Cambio 90	Andrés Reggiardo	16.93	32	New
United Left	Henry Pease	9.82	16	−32
FIM	Fernando Olivera	5.95	7	New
Socialist Left	Alfonso Barrantes	5.24	4	New
FRENATRACA	Roger Cáceres	2.42	3	+2
MRL		0.48	1	+1
Tacneñista Front		0.34	1	New
Popular Agreement		0.28	1	New
This lists parties that won seats. See the complete results below.

General elections were held in Peru on 8 April 1990, with a second round of the presidential elections on 10 June. This exercise was to elect the President of the Republic, two vice presidents, and the members of Congress. The elections filled 180 seats in the Chamber of Deputies and 60 seats in the Senate for the 1990-1995 governmental period.

The run-off was between favorite, novelist Mario Vargas Llosa leading a coalition of economically liberal parties collectively known as the Democratic Front and political underdog Alberto Fujimori of the populist and more moderate Cambio 90. Vargas Llosa won the first round with a small plurality, but alienated much of the electorate with a comprehensive privatisation agenda, bolstering the allegedly unelectable Fujimori who had finished second ahead of Luis Alva Castro of the ruling APRA party to enter the run-off against Vargas Llosa. Fujimori eventually won a landslide victory and would remain president for ten years until his forced resignation in November 2000.

== Background ==
At the time of the 1990 elections the government of Alan García of the Peruvian Aprista Party (APRA) faced significant public disapproval. This disapproval was due to attempts to nationalize the banking system, purportedly to control rampant inflation that had been uncontrollable since 1987. Garcia's administration was also marred by corruption scandals and a resurgence of terrorist violence, notably from the terrorist organization Shining Path. Consequently, it was anticipated that the elections would prompt a significant right-wing response.

== Presidential candidates ==
Mario Vargas Llosa, a widely recognized writer, ran as the candidate of the tripartite coalition Democratic Front (FREDEMO). Vargas Llosa was initially favored to win decisively, potentially eliminating the need for a runoff, particularly given the perceived weakness of the incumbent APRA party. APRA nominated Luis Alva Castro, its second vice-president, as its candidate. However, as the campaign progressed, Alberto Fujimori, representing the small new party Cambio 90, began to gain increasing support in the polls. Fujimori's rise was attributed to his moderate profile, which drew support away from the traditional candidates.

== Campaign ==
During the presidential runoff Fujimori received endorsements from United Left and Socialist Left, along with a faction of the APRA led by García. Vargas Llosa was supported by Ricardo Belmont, the newly elected mayor of Lima, and Ezequiel Ataucusi, the leader of the Agricultural People's Front. Vargas Llosa also received backing from various media outlets and personalities, including the newspaper Expreso, Panamericana Televisión and television host Augusto Ferrando.

== Debates ==
A debate between Vargas Llosa and Fujimori took place on 3 June 1990 during the runoff campaign. This was the first televised debate in Peruvian presidential elections.

== Opinion polls ==
=== President ===
==== First round ====
Pollster	Date	Vargas Llosa	Barrantes	Alva Castro	Pease	Bedoya Reyes	Others	None
Apoyo S.A.	March 1989	34%	36%	-				30%
Apoyo S.A.	April 1989	36%	27%	9%	-	-	-	-
Apoyo S.A.	April 1989	36%	23%	7%	-	-	-	-
Datum	16 June 1989	46%	4%	8%	18%	-	-	20%
Mercadeo y Opinión	25 June 1989		38%					
Imasen	26 June 1989	13.7%	18.7%	7.9%	-	5.4%	2.1%	34.4%
Apoyo S.A.	27 June 1989	44%	19%	-	-	-	-	-
Apoyo S.A.	October 1989	47%	14%	8%	7%	-	-	-
Imasen	November 1989	52%	10.5%	4.7%	5.4%	-	2.3%	-

== Results ==
Due to mandatory voting laws voter turnout was high, reaching 78% in the presidential election but notably lower in the legislative elections, with 68% for the Chamber of Deputies and 69% for the Senate. Voter turnout for the presidential runoff was slightly higher than in the first round at 80%.

=== President ===
In the first round Vargas Llosa received 33% of the votes, while Fujimori, who had initially polled at 1%, significantly increased his support to secure second place with 29% of the vote. Alva Castro of the incumbent APRA party finished in third place with 22% of the vote, the first time that the APRA candidate did not finish first or second in a free election. No other candidate exceeded 10% of the vote; the two main left-wing candidates representing United Left and Socialist Left finished in fourth and fifth place with 8% and 5% of the vote respectively.

As no candidate received more than 50% of the valid vote in the first round, a runoff was necessary for the first time in Peruvian history. Fujimori achieved a decisive victory with 62% of the vote, making him the first elected president since the restoration of democracy to secure over half of the total vote. Vargas Llosa saw a small increase in support from the first round, receiving 38% of the vote. Although Vargas Llosa had won across the country in the first round, in the runoff he only received a majority of the vote in the department of Loreto.

Candidate	Party	First round		Second round	
Candidate	Party	Votes	%	Votes	%
Mario Vargas Llosa	Democratic Front	2,163,323	32.57	2,708,291	37.62
Alberto Fujimori	Cambio 90	1,932,208	29.09	4,489,897	62.38
Luis Alva Castro	American Popular Revolutionary Alliance	1,494,231	22.50		
Henry Pease	United Left	544,889	8.20		
Alfonso Barrantes	Socialist Left	315,038	4.74		
Roger Cáceres	National Front of Workers and Peasants	86,418	1.30		
Ezequiel Ataucusi Gamonal	Agricultural People's Front of Peru	73,974	1.11		
Dora Narrea	Odriist National Union	21,962	0.33		
Nicolás de Pierola Balta	Democratic Union	9,541	0.14		
Total		6,641,584	100.00	7,198,188	100.00
Valid votes		6,641,584	84.75	7,198,188	90.45
Invalid/blank votes		1,195,532	15.25	760,044	9.55
Total votes		7,837,116	100.00	7,958,232	100.00
Registered voters/turnout		10,013,225	78.27	10,007,614	79.52
Source: Nohlen

=== Senate ===
Party	Votes	%	Seats	+/–
Democratic Front	1,772,953	32.06	20	+7
American Popular Revolutionary Alliance	1,387,931	25.09	16	–14
Cambio 90	1,200,459	21.70	14	New
United Left	540,620	9.77	6	–9
Socialist Left	302,110	5.46	3	New
National Front of Workers and Peasants	112,142	2.03	1	0
Agricultural People's Front of Peru	63,694	1.15	0	New
Somos Libres	50,430	0.91	0	New
Independent Civic Union	45,046	0.81	0	New
Odriist National Union	16,349	0.30	0	–1
Hayist Bases Movement	13,531	0.24	0	New
Independent Front of Retirees	8,994	0.16	0	New
Democratic Union	7,805	0.14	0	New
National Co-operation	3,969	0.07	0	New
Solidarity Independent Movement	3,088	0.06	0	New
Honorary Confederation of Independent Organised Struggle	1,779	0.03	0	New
Former presidents			2	+1
Total	5,530,900	100.00	62	+1
Valid votes	5,530,900	80.53		
Invalid/blank votes	1,336,963	19.47		
Total votes	6,867,863	100.00		
Registered voters/turnout	10,013,225	68.59		
Source: JNE

=== Chamber of Deputies ===
FREDEMO emerged as the largest party in both chambers, securing 20 senators and 62 deputies. Despite its presidential candidate finishing third, the APRA maintained its position as the second-largest party, winning 17 senate seats and 53 deputy seats. Cambio 90 led by Fujimori finished third, capturing 14 Senate seats and 32 in the Chamber of Deputies.

Party	Votes	%	Seats	+/–
Democratic Front	1,561,291	30.03	62	+40
American Popular Revolutionary Alliance	1,288,461	24.78	53	–54
Cambio 90	879,949	16.93	32	New
United Left	510,557	9.82	16	–32
Independent Moralizing Front	309,263	5.95	7	New
Socialist Left	272,591	5.24	4	New
National Front of Workers and Peasants	126,067	2.42	3	+2
Agricultural People's Front of Peru	63,450	1.22	0	New
Independent Civic Union	33,819	0.65	0	New
Loreto Regionalist Movement	24,854	0.48	1	+1
Tacneñista Front	17,642	0.34	1	New
Popular Agreement Independent List	14,547	0.28	1	New
In Action Independent Movement	12,614	0.24	0	New
Odriist National Union	10,413	0.20	0	New
Democratic Union	7,738	0.15	0	New
Nationalist Independent Front	6,106	0.12	0	New
Hayist Bases Movement	5,607	0.11	0	New
National Reconstruction Movement	5,588	0.11	0	New
Independent Democratic Front	4,780	0.09	0	New
Independent Social Movement	4,348	0.08	0	New
Lima Defence Front – Provinces	3,739	0.07	0	New
Independent Front of Retirees	3,477	0.07	0	New
Chavin Region	3,416	0.07	0	New
Democratic Alliance	3,204	0.06	0	New
Democratic Agrarian Front "Atusparia"	3,016	0.06	0	New
Velasquista Movement	2,228	0.04	0	New
National Cooperation	2,136	0.04	0	New
Independent List of Socialist Workers	1,942	0.04	0	New
Amazonense Independent Movement	1,459	0.03	0	New
Renewal Union of Peru	1,312	0.03	0	New
Huascaran	1,221	0.02	0	New
National Democratic Unity	1,025	0.02	0	New
United	1,020	0.02	0	New
Victors of Ayacucho	985	0.02	0	New
Chalaco Regional Movement	925	0.02	0	New
Independent Solidarity Movement	913	0.02	0	New
Integration Movement for the Development of Huanuco	817	0.02	0	New
Popular Renewal Movement	772	0.01	0	New
Porteño Renovation Movement	735	0.01	0	New
Independent Democratic Movement	675	0.01	0	New
Lambayecano Independent Movement	671	0.01	0	New
Independent Agreement for National Development	597	0.01	0	New
North-East Agrarian Movement	578	0.01	0	New
Andean Nationalist Left	502	0.01	0	New
Impetu Regional Independent Movement	398	0.01	0	New
Independent Popular Peruvian Alliance	375	0.01	0	New
PASOP party	357	0.01	0	New
Independent Democratic Organisation	342	0.01	0	New
Advanced Democratic Integration	332	0.01	0	New
Independent Civic Front Strength and Freedom	157	0.00	0	New
Independent Democratic Socialist Party	92	0.00	0	New
Total	5,199,103	100.00	180	0
Source: CLEA

==== By constituency ====
Constituency	Total seats	FREDEMO	APRA	Cambio 90	United Left	Others
Amazonas	3	1	2	0	0	0
Ancash	9	2	4	2	1	0
Apurimac	3	1	0	0	2	0
Arequipa	9	3	2	2	1	1
Ayacucho	4	1	2	0	1	0
Cajamarca	10	3	5	0	1	1
Callao	7	3	2	2	0	0
Cusco	8	2	1	3	2	0
Huancavelica	3	2	0	1	0	0
Huanuco	4	2	1	1	0	0
Ica	6	2	2	1	1	0
Junin	10	4	1	5	0	0
La Libertad	11	2	8	1	0	0
Lambayeque	8	3	5	0	0	0
Lima 1	9	3	3	2	1	0
Lima 2	40	14	6	9	2	9
Loreto	5	3	1	0	0	1
Madre De Dios	1	0	0	0	1	0
Moquegua	1	0	0	0	1	0
Pasco	2	2	0	0	0	0
Piura	11	4	5	0	1	1
Puno	8	1	1	3	1	2
San Martin	3	2	1	0	0	0
Tacna	2	1	0	0	0	1
Tumbes	1	0	1	0	0	0
Ucayali	2	1	0	0	0	1
Source: CLEA

== Aftermath ==
The two chambers of the elected Congress in Peru were unable to complete their constitutional terms due to a self-coup by Fujimori on 5 April 1992, in which he dissolved Congress and intervened in the judiciary, effectively suspending the constitutional governance. Following the coup, Fujimori governed with full powers until the end of 1993, when a Democratic Constituent Congress was inaugurated. Despite the political upheaval, Fujimori completed his term and was re-elected in 1995. This period of governance led to significant constitutional reform, including the abolition of the Senate. As a result, the 1990 elections were the last for the bicameral parliament, until it was restored in time for the 2026 presidential election.
