= Alfonso Barrantes =

Peruvian politician

Alfonso Barrantes Lingán
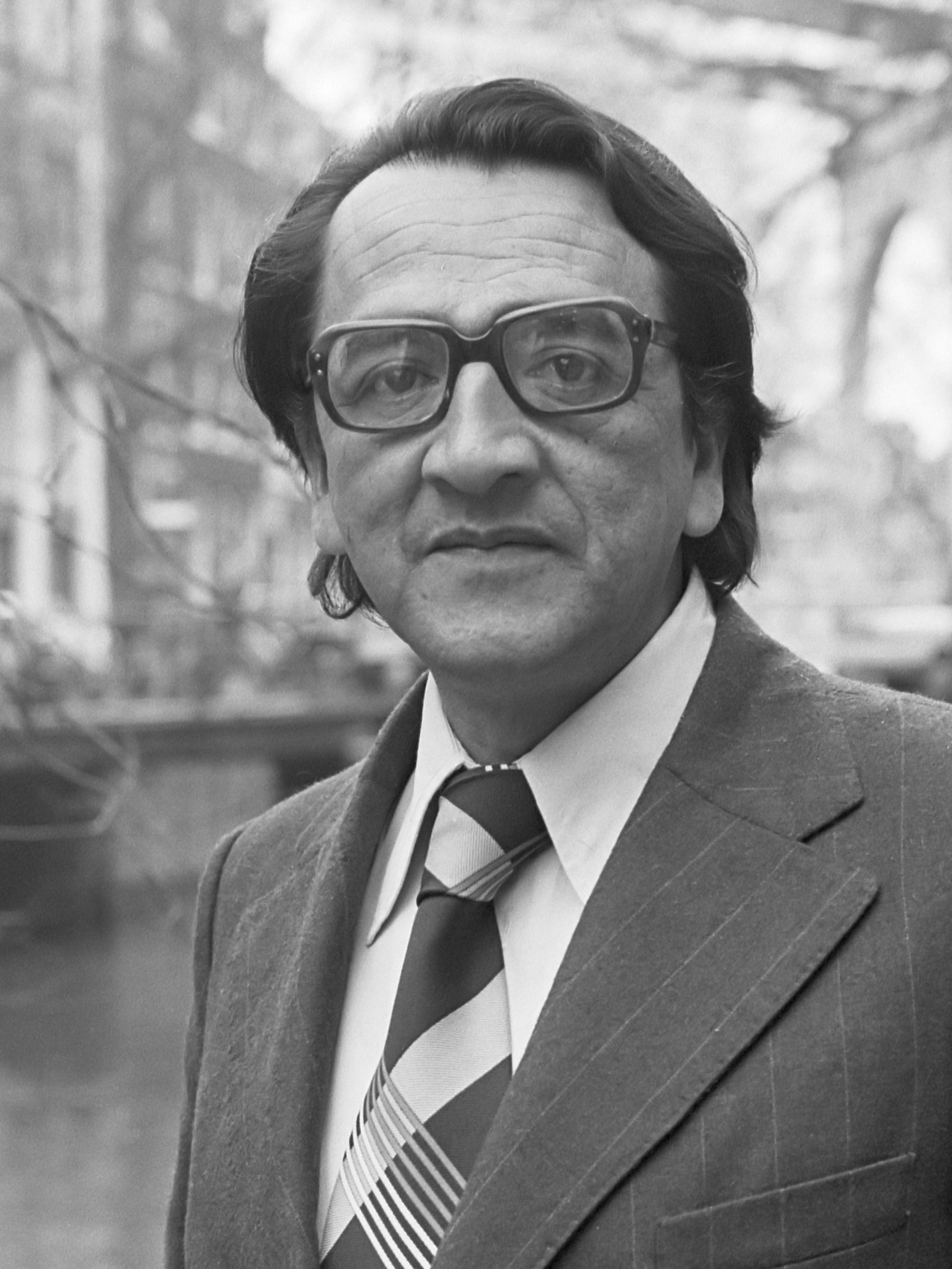
- Alfonso Barrantes Lingán (1979)

Mayor of Lima
- In office 1 January 1984 – 31 December 1986
- Preceded by: Eduardo Orrego
- Succeeded by: Jorge Del Castillo

Personal details
- Born: Alfonso Barrantes Lingán; November 27, 1927 San Miguel de Pallaques, Cajamarca, Peru
- Died: December 2, 2000 (aged 73) Havana, Cuba
- Party: United Left
- Profession: Lawyer

Alfonso Barrantes Lingán (San Miguel de Pallaques, November 27, 1927 – Havana, December 2, 2000) was a Peruvian politician in the mid-1980s who served as Mayor of Lima from 1984 to 1986. He was the first Marxist mayor of Lima. He ran for President of Peru two times, losing on both occasions.

== Early life and education ==
He was born in San Miguel Province, Cajamarca, Peru in 1927. He lived with his mother in the Lima Province of San Miguel. He studied law at the National University of San Marcos and became involved with the APRA party which eventually became his political enemy. He became president of the Student Association.

== Political career ==
=== Mayor of Lima ===
Affiliated with the United Left Party, he was the mayor of Lima from 1984 to 1986. During his mayoral term, he was known as El Frejolito (Little Bean) and was known for his campaign to ensure a daily glass of milk for every child in Lima. This program still survives today. His Lieutenant Mayor was Henry Pease. He was the creator of the town of Huaycán.

=== Presidential campaign ===
He ran for President of Peru in 1985 and came in second place. He withdrew before the runoff and Alan García of the APRA was elected president. In 1990, he ran again but placed 5th and Alberto Fujimori was elected president in the runoff against Mario Vargas Llosa.

== Retirement and death ==
He died in Havana, Cuba in December 2000 at the age of 73. He was buried in Los Sauces Sector in Cementerio Jardines de la Paz in La Molina District, Lima.

Political offices
| Preceded by Eduardo Orrego | Mayor of Lima; 1984–1986 | Succeeded by Jorge del Castillo |
