= Eduardo Orrego Villacorta =

Peruvian politician and architect (1933–1994)

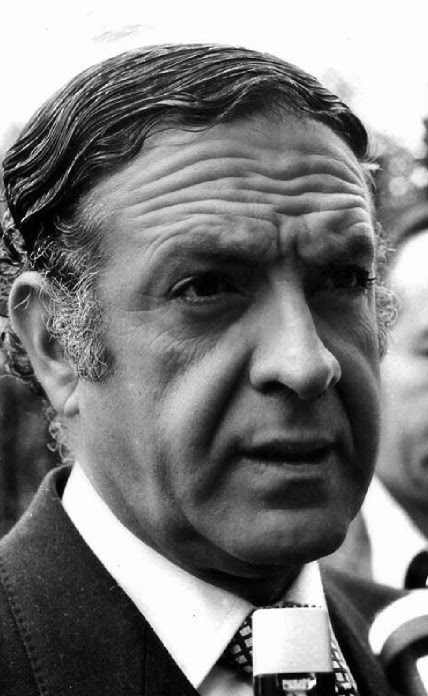
Eduardo Orrego Villacorta

Eduardo Orrego Villacorta (September 12, 1933 in Chiclayo – December 24, 1994 in Lima) was a Peruvian architect and politician in the early 1980s.

He studied architecture in Universidad Nacional de Ingeniería (UNI). Orrego was the mayor of Lima from 1981 to 1983.

Preceded by Pedro Pierantoni	Mayor of Lima; 1981–1983	Succeeded by Alfonso Barrantes
