= Henry Pease (Peruvian politician) =

Peruvian politician (1944–2014)

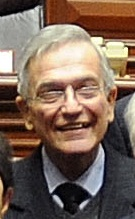

President of Congress
- In office 26 July 2003 – 26 July 2004
- Preceded by: Carlos Ferrero Costa
- Succeeded by: Antero Flores Aráoz

Member of Congress
- In office 26 July 2001 – 26 July 2006
- Constituency: Lima
- In office 26 July 1995 – 26 July 2001
- Constituency: National

Member of the Democratic Constituent Congress
- In office 26 November 1992 – 26 July 1995
- Constituency: National

Lima City Councilman
- In office 1 January 1984 – 31 December 1989

Personal details
- Born: Henry Gustavo Pease García; 11 December 1944 Lima, Peru
- Died: 9 August 2014 (aged 69) Lima, Peru
- Party: Possible Peru
- Other political affiliations: Union for Peru; United Left
- Education: Pontifical Catholic University of Peru

Henry Gustavo Pease García, known as Henry Pease, (11 December 1944 – 9 August 2014) was a Peruvian politician and a former Congressman. He ran for president under the United Left in the 1990 general elections but placed fourth with 8.2% of the popular vote and failed to qualify for the run-off.

== Biography ==
Pease was born on 11 December 1944 in Lima. He ran for president under the United Left in the 1990 general elections but placed fourth with 8.2% of the popular vote and failed to qualify for the run-off which was eventually won by Alberto Fujimori. Two years later, he was elected as a Congressman in the Democratic Constituent Congress and three years later in 1995 in the Congress of the Republic and served until 2006. In the general elections of 2000, he was a candidate for the 1st Vice Presidency on the presidential roster of Máximo San Román for Union for Peru, however, said roster did not pass to the runoff and Pease was only re-elected Congressman for the parliamentary period 2000–2005.

He participated in the March of the Four Suyos where he was an opponent of the dictatorship of Alberto Fujimori and in November of the same year, he was elected Second Vice President of Congress on the board of directors chaired by Valentín Paniagua (2000), who later became Temporary President. After the fall of the Fujimori regime in November 2000, his parliamentary position was reduced until 2001 when new general elections were called. While he was serving in the Democratic Constituent Congress, he was a member of the Democratic Left Movement. He served as the President of the Congress for a year between 2003 and 2004. He tried to run for Congress again in the 2011 general elections, under the Possible Peru Alliance, representing Lima, but he was not elected as he attained a low number of votes and retired from politics.

=== Death ===
He died on 9 August 2014 in Lima at the age of 69.

== Personal life ==
Pease was characterized by being one of the most illustrious and loyal politicians in Peru. This is evidenced when, at the time of terror and the self-coup carried out by the Fujimori regime, Congressman Pease directly faced authoritarianism and dictatorship. The defense of democracy and the rule of law have been a constant without deviation in his life. Despite receiving threats, Pease was undaunted by the fear.

He always showed a considerably broader perspective than many of his colleagues, an argument for this, is the proposal that he offers to the political class, at the time of the Shining Path, so that it is the Police Service that takes charge of this lineage of the society as had been successfully achieved in European countries, but said political class did not accept. However, in 1992, it was the GEIN (Special Group of National Police Intelligence) that captured three-quarters of the top leadership of the terrorist group.

He maintained close professional and personal relationships with several Peruvian political figures, including María Elena Moyano, a community leader in the Villa El Salvador district. He also had a close relationship with Valentín Paniagua, the transitional President of Peru in 2000, who was notably elected to office meeting at Pease's residence. Additionally, he served as Lieutenant Mayor underAlfonso Barrantes in 1983. Pease was recognized by his contemporary observers for consistently acting in accordance to ethical standards and for his commitment to public service.

Among his most heroic acts is the March for Peace, which he led in 1989 when he was already a candidate for the presidency. This march was held on November 3 of that year as a response to an announcement by the Shining Path terrorist group, which called the country to panic the same day. However, thanks to the political movement inspired by Pease and supported by all the other political parties, including Mario Vargas Llosa, the largest and most numerous march in the history of Peru was held. This was later repeated in all the capitals of the country as a symbol of a united and courageous Peru against the fear of the Shining Path.

== See also ==
- Alfonso Barrantes Lingán
