= Carlos Ferrero =

Peruvian politician (1941–2025)

Carlos Ferrero Costa
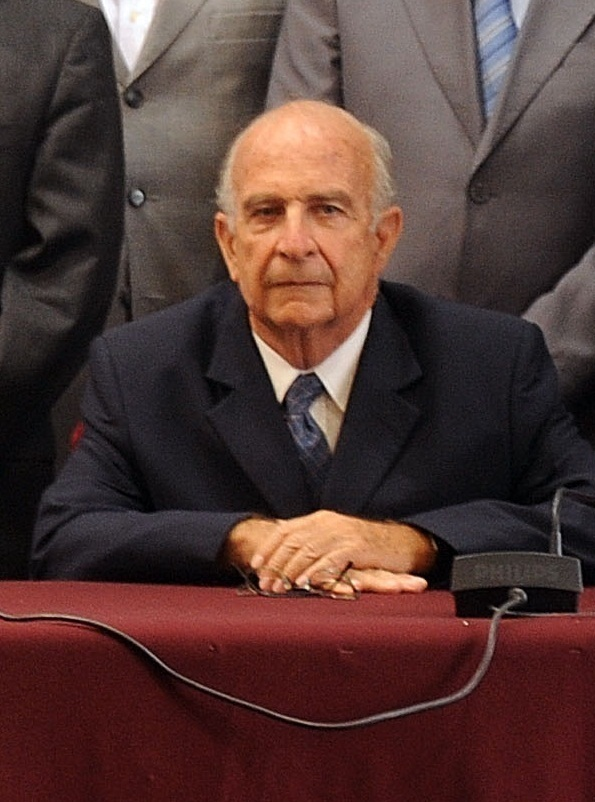
- Ferrero in 2012

Prime Minister of Peru
- In office 15 December 2003 – 16 August 2005
- President: Alejandro Toledo
- Preceded by: Beatriz Merino
- Succeeded by: Pedro Pablo Kuczynski

President of Congress
- In office 5 December 2000 – 26 July 2003; Acting: 5 December 2000 – 26 July 2001
- Preceded by: Francisco Tudela (Acting)
- Succeeded by: Henry Pease García

Member of Congress
- In office 26 July 2001 – 26 July 2006
- Constituency: Lima
- In office 26 July 1995 – 26 July 2001
- Constituency: National

Member of the Democratic Constituent Congress
- In office 26 November 1992 – 26 July 1995
- Constituency: National

Personal details
- Born: Carlos Ernesto Fernando Ferrero Costa; 7 February 1941 Lima, Peru
- Died: 31 January 2025 (aged 83)
- Party: Perú Posible
- Other political affiliations: Cambio 90–New Majority
- Website: Official Site

Carlos Ernesto Fernando Ferrero Costa (7 February 1941 – 31 January 2025) was a Peruvian politician who served as congressman as a member of Perú Posible representing Lima from 1995 until 2006 and also served as the President of the Congress from late-2000 until 2003. He was the Prime Minister of Peru from December 2003 until his resignation in August 2005. He belongs to the Perú Posible party. Before he became a member of the Perú Posible party, he was part of the Fujimorist Cambio 90 of Alberto Fujimori.

His predecessor was Beatriz Merino, who resigned on 15 October 2003 at the request of President Alejandro Toledo.

== Background and education ==
Ferrero was born on 7 February 1941. Son of the agronomist Alfredo Ferrero Rebagliati and Adelina Costa Elice, he was born in Lima in 1941. A few days later, his family moved to Pisco, Ica. He returned to Lima, where he completed his initial studies at the Immaculate Heart School, and then finished high school at the Santa María Marianistas School.

His uncle, Raúl Ferrero Rebagliati, was President of the Council of Ministers and Minister of Foreign Affairs. His brother, lawyer and diplomat Eduardo Ferrero Costa, was Chancellor during Alberto Fujimori's second government.

His higher studies were carried out at the Pontifical Catholic University of Peru, which he entered in 1959. At that university, he graduated with a Bachelor of Arts (1964) and Law (1966). He also studied at the Center for Higher Military Studies. During his university days, he was a member of the Christian Social Student Front.

His brother was Eduardo Ferrero Costa, who is the former Ambassador (and former Minister of Foreign Affairs under the Fujimori Administration) in the United States.

Ferrero died on 31 January 2025, at the age of 83.

== Early career ==
Ferrero practised radio journalism on Radio Miraflores as a political commentator (1965–1969). In the same way, he has been a news commentator on Panamericana Televisión (1978–1980) and América Televisión (1989). He was Co-host of the 2x2 television programme on Canal N (1999–2000).

He worked at the Central Reserve Bank of Peru (1965–1982). He entered the Department of Economic Studies and followed training at the International Monetary Fund in Analysis and Financial Policy (1967). He then went on to work for the General Secretariat of the BCR.

Ferrero was administrative manager of the BCR (1976–1980) and president of the Peruvian part of the Puyango-Tumbes Binational Commission (1978–1980). He went on to the bank's legal department until he resigned in 1982.

He was a professor of law at the universities: Femenina del Sagrado Corazón (1965–1967), Católica, Ricardo Palma, San Martín de Porres, San Marcos and Lima, as well as the Diplomatic Academy of Peru.

== Political career ==
Ferrero worked for former president Alberto Fujimori, and was elected several times under his party, Cambio 90–New Majority. After he was in disgrace with the government, he passed to the opposition party. In the 2000 elections, he ran for First Vice President as the running mate of Alejandro Toledo in his Perú Posible ticket but the ticket lost to Alberto Fujimori’s Peru 2000 ticket. Nevertheless, he was re-elected to Congress. In late 2000, after the resignation of Fujimori, he ran against Valentín Paniagua for the Presidency of the Peruvian Congress. He lost the election, and Paniagua claimed his position as Interim President of Peru. He would then become President of the Congress in 2000, and was reaffirmed in 2001 and 2002 and served until 2003.

Ferrero became Prime Minister on 15 December 2003. On 13 January 2004, he appeared before the Congress of the Republic to present the general policy of the government and ask for the vote of confidence (also called the investiture). Ferrero addressed the congressmen and announced that the government would meet the growing social demands and that it would follow the lines that the Toledo government proposed since July 2001: improving institutions, reducing poverty, strengthening trade and the economy, reform and modernization of the State and fighting against corruption. Ferrero emphasized the reform of the State to combat corruption and the realignment of public resources. Ferrero announced the proposal to modify the Organic Law of the Executive Power, the draft Framework Law of Public Employment, the Law of Incompatibilities and prohibitions for the exercise of public function, and the law of the Public Employment Remuneration System. He also announced that they would promote the simplification of procedures, decentralization, private investment, education, and social programs, among others. At the end of his presentation, Ferrero raised the question of confidence, which obtained 49 votes in favour, 6 against and 44 abstentions.

He resigned abruptly on 11 August 2005, when president Alejandro Toledo appointed Fernando Olivera as Minister of Foreign Affairs. He failed to attain re-election in the 2006 elections.

Political offices
Preceded by Francisco Tudela (Acting)	President of the Congress; 2000–2003	Succeeded by Henry Pease García
Preceded by Beatriz Merino	Prime Minister of Peru; 2003–2005	Succeeded by Pedro Pablo Kuczynski
