= Democratic Front (Peru) =

Democratic Front Frente Democrático
- Abbreviation: FREDEMO
- Leader: Mario Vargas Llosa
- Founded: 1988
- Dissolved: 1990
- Ideology: Economic liberalism; Christian democracy; Factions: Reformism; Social conservatism; Republicanism
- Political position: Centre-right

Democratic Front (Spanish: Frente Democrático), also known as FREDEMO (Spanish pronunciation: [fɾeˈð̞e.mo]), was a center-right economically liberal and social conservative political alliance in Peru founded in 1988 by Liberty Movement, Popular Action and Christian People's Party. FREDEMO contested the 1989 municipal elections and the 1990 presidential elections (with famous author Mario Vargas Llosa as its candidate).

== Electoral history ==
=== Presidential elections ===
Year	Candidate	Coalition	Votes	Percentage	Outcome
1990	Mario Vargas Llosa	Democratic Front AP-PPC-ML	1st Round: 2 163 323	1st Round: 32.57	1st Round: 1st
1990	Mario Vargas Llosa	Democratic Front AP-PPC-ML	2nd Round: 2 708 291	2nd Round: 37.62	2nd Round: 2nd

=== Elections to the Congress of the Republic ===
Year	Votes	%	Seats	▲/▼	Position
1990	1 492 513	30.1%	62 / 180	▲62	Minority

=== Elections to the Senate ===
Year	Votes	%	Seats	▲/▼	Position
1990	1 791 077	32.3%	20 / 62	▲19	Minority
