= Communist Party – Red Star =

Peruvian communist group

Communist Party - Red Star Partido Comunista – Estrella Roja
- Abbreviation: PC-ER
- Founded: 1971
- Split from: Peruvian Communist Party
- Ideology: Communism

Communist Party – Red Star (Spanish: Partido Comunista – Estrella Roja, PC-ER) was a splinter group of the Peruvian Communist Party that appeared in the beginnings of the 1970s in Peru. PC-ER opposed participation in elections.

It is no longer active.

== See also ==
- Communist Party of Ecuador - Red Sun
- Communist Party of Peru - Red Fatherland
- Peruvian Communist Party (Red Flag)
- Revolutionary Communist Party - Red Trench, in Peru
