= Constituent Assembly of Peru =

Constituent Assembly Asamblea Constituyente
- Republic of Peru

Type
- Type: Unicameral

History
- Established: 28 July 1978
- Disbanded: 13 July 1979
- Preceded by: Congress of the Republic of Peru
- Succeeded by: Congress of the Republic of Peru

Leadership
- President of the Constituent Assembly: Víctor Raúl Haya de la Torre, Peruvian Aprista Party
- Seats: 100

Meeting place
- Legislative Palace (Peru)

The Constituent Assembly was the tenth Constituent Assembly of Peru, convened by the government of General Francisco Morales Bermudez to facilitate the return of democracy following a decade of the self-styled Revolutionary Government of the Armed Forces. It was settled on 28 July 1978 and was led by Víctor Raúl Haya de la Torre, historical leader of the American Popular Revolutionary Alliance. Its main mission was to develop a new constitution replacing the old 1933 Constitution. This new Constitution was enacted and promulgated on 12 July 1979, and entered into force on 28 July 1980, on the opening of the constitutional government of the architect Fernando Belaúnde Terry. It was replaced 14 years later by the 1993 Constitution.

== Composition and Structure ==
=== Board ===
- Víctor Raúl Haya de la Torre, President
- Luis Alberto Sánchez, First Vice President and Constitution Committee Chairman
- Ernesto Alayza Grundy, Second Vice President
- Jorge Lozada Stanbury, First Secretary
- Rafael Vega García, Second Secretary
- Manuel Adrianzen Castillo, Pro Secretary
- Carlos Roca, Librarian Pro Secretary
- Moisés Woll Dávila, Treasurer

=== Representatives ===
Peruvian Aprista Party

- 1. Víctor Raúl Haya de la Torre
- 2. Ramiro Prialé
- 3. Andrés Townsend
- 4. Fernando León de Vivero
- 5. Carlos Manuel Cox
- 6. Luis Heysen
- 7. Carlos Enrique Melgar
- 8. Carlos Enrique Ferreyros
- 9. Javier Valle Riestra
- 10. Luis Rodríguez Vildosola
- 11. Héctor Vargas Haya
- 12. Humberto Carranza Piedra
- 13. Eulogio Tapia Olarte
- 14. Lucio Muñiz Flores
- 15. Luis Rivera Tamayo
- 16. Jorge Lozada Stanbury
- 17. Alfonso Ramos Alva
- 18. Alan García Pérez
- 19. Gustavo García Mundaca
- 20. Mario Peláez Bazán
- 21. Julio Cruzado Zavala
- 22. Luis Alberto Sánchez
- 23. Romualdo Biaggi Rodríguez
- 24. Guillermo Baca Aguinaga
- 25. Jorge Torres Vallejo
- 26. Saturnino Berrospi Mendez
- 27. Carlos Roca
- 28. Urbina Julve Ciriaco
- 29. Lucio Galarza Villar
- 30. Arnaldo Alvarado
- 31. Luis Negreiros
- 32. Josmell A. Muñoz Córdova
- 33. Enrique Chirinos Soto
- 34. Francisco Chirinos Soto
- 35. Arturo Miranda Valenzuela
- 36. Pedro Arana Quiroz
- 37. César Vizcarra Vargas

Christian People's Party

- 38. Luis Bedoya Reyes
- 39. Federico Tovar Freire
- 40. Xavier Barrón
- 41. Alberto Thorndike Elmore
- 42. Andrés Aramburu Menchaca
- 43. Clohaldo Salazar Penailillo
- 44. Mario Polár Ugarteche
- 45. Roberto Ramírez del Villar
- 46. Óscar Olivares Montano
- 47. Edwin Montesinos Ruiz
- 48. Rafael Vega García
- 49. Lauro Muñoz Garay
- 50. Ernesto Alayza Grundy
- 51. Moisés Woll Dávila
- 52. Manuel Kawashito Nagana
- 53. Pedro Gotuzzo Fernandini
- 54. Gabriela Porto Cárdenas de Power
- 55. Rafael Risco Boado
- 56. Genix Ruiz Hidalgo
- 57. Miguel Ángel Arévalo del Valle
- 58. Jorge Neyra Bisso
- 59. Celso Sotomarino Chávez
- 60. Armando Buendía Gutiérrez
- 61. Miguel Ángel Mufarech Nemy
- 62. Ruben Chang Gamarra

Popular Workers Student Farmers Front

- 63. Hugo Blanco
- 64. Genaro Ledesma
- 65. Magda Benavides Morales
- 66. Hernán Cuentas Anci
- 67. German Chamba Calle
- 68. Ricardo Napuri Schapiro
- 69. Enrique Fernández Chacón
- 70. Juan Cornejo Gómez
- 71. César Augusto Mateu Moya
- 72. Romain Ovidio Montoya Chávez
- 73. Victoriano Lázaro Gutiérrez
- 74. Saturnino Paredes Macedo

Peruvian Communist Party

- 75. Raúl Acosta Salas
- 76. Eduardo Castillo Sánchez
- 77. Luis Alberto Delgado Bejar
- 78. Jorge del Prado
- 79. Isodoro Gamarra Ramírez
- 80. Alejandro Olivera

Revolutionary Socialist Party

- 81. Antonio Aragón Gallegos
- 82. Miguel Echeandía Urbina
- 83. Avelino Mar Arias
- 84. Antonio Meza Cuadra
- 85. Leonidas Rodríguez Figueroa
- 86. Alberto Ruiz Eldredge

Popular Democratic Union

- 87. Carlos Malpica Silva Santisteban
- 88. Javier Diez Canseco
- 89. Ricardo Díaz Chávez
- 90. Víctor Cuadros Paredes

Workers and Farmers National Front

- 91. Pedro Cáceres Velásquez
- 92. Roger Cáceres Velásquez
- 93. Ernesto Sánchez Fajardo
- 94. Jesús Veliz Lizarraga

Christian Democrat Party

- 95. Héctor Cornejo Chávez
- 96. Carlos Arturo Moretti Ricardi

Peruvian Democratic Movement

- 97. Marco Antonio Garrido Malo
- 98. Javier Ortiz de Zevallos

Odriist National Union

- 99. Manuel Adrianzen Castillo
- 100. Víctor Freundt Rosell

=== Innovations of the Constitution ===
The main innovations of this Constitution, compared to its predecessor, were:

- The President, the two Vice-Presidents and members of Congress (deputies and senators) would be elected jointly every five years in general elections (previous renovations were abolished parliamentary by thirds or halves)
- The set up the second round of the elections for President, should not reach more than half (50% plus one) of the votes validly cast
- Strengthened the authority of the President of the Republic. This could be seen "in whole or in part" the bills passed in Congress and could dissolve the House of Deputies if it censured three of the Presidential Cabinet. Could also grant pardons and commute sentences. It also gave him more power over the budget, which allowed a greater capacity to implement its policies.
- Corrected parliamentary excessive powers referred to in the Constitution of 1933
- Limited death penalty only for cases of treason in foreign war. It was abolished for crimes like murder and others included in the law.
- Established citizenship for all Peruvians from 18 years (before the minimum age was 21 years)
- It repealed the restriction on voting by illiterate
- Watched the insurgency right (obviously, to defend the constitutional order and not to alter or bruise)
- Created the Constitutional Tribunal of Peru, as the controlling body of the Constitution
- On the economic side, the rules would be the social market economy, corporate pluralism and freedom of trade and industry
