= Ramiro Prialé =

Peruvian politician

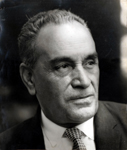

President of the Senate of Peru
- In office 1987 – February 25, 1988
- Preceded by: Armando Villanueva
- Succeeded by: Jorge Lozada Stanbury
- In office 1964 – 1965
- Preceded by: Julio de la Piedra
- Succeeded by: David Aguilar Cornejo

Senator of Peru for Junín
- In office 1980 – 1988
- In office 1963 – 1968
- In office 1945 – 1948

Deputy of the Constituent Assembly of Peru
- In office 1978 – 1979

General Secretary of the Peruvian Aprista Party
- In office 1956 – 1968
- President: Víctor Raúl Haya de la Torre
- Preceded by: Luis Felipe de Las Casas Grieve
- Succeeded by: Armando Villanueva

Personal details
- Born: Ramiro Abelardo Prialé Prialé; January 6, 1904 Huancayo, Peruvian Republic
- Died: February 25, 1988 (aged 84) Lima, Peru
- Party: American Popular Revolutionary Alliance
- Education: National University of San Marcos
- Occupation: Lawyer & politician

Ramiro Abelardo Prialé Prialé (January 6, 1904 – February 27, 1988) was a Peruvian politician. A member of the American Popular Revolutionary Alliance, he was a friend of Víctor Raúl Haya De La Torre. He served as the President of the Senate from July 1964 to July 1965, and from July 1987 until his death. Several roads and places in Lima are named for him.

== Biography ==
Prialé was born in Huancayo on January 6, 1904. He was the son of Pedro Sixto Prialé Ráez and Edelmira Prialé Morales. He did his school studies at the Colegio Nacional Santa Isabel de Huancayo. He married Carmen Luzmila Jaime Torres, with whom he would have five children: Ramiro Alfonso, Raquel Edelmira, Pedro José, Víctor Gustavo and Carmen Luzmila. With his first son, he traveled to Lima to study Law at the Universidad Nacional Mayor de San Marcos.

At some point, he and Torres separated, and he married Antonieta Zevallos de Prialé in 1945.

== Political career ==
He was the founder of the Peruvian Aprista Party together with Víctor Raúl Haya de la Torre, being one of its historical leaders. He was elected senator by his native Junín in the elections of 1945, 1963, 1980 and 1985. He was a mentor and teacher of numerous leaders of different generations such as Alberto Valencia Cárdenas, Gilmer Calderón Cuenca, José Barsallo Burga, Melitón Arce, Carlos Roca and the current prominent leaders Mercedes Cabanillas, former President of the Congress from 2006-2007.
