= Revolutionary Communist Party – Red Trench =

Revolutionary Communist Party – Red Trench (Spanish: Partido Comunista Revolucionario - Trinchera Roja; PCR-TR) was a communist party in Peru. PCR-TR was formed in 1977, through a split in the PCR. PCR-TR was led by Agustín Haya de la Torre and Jorge Nieto.

The PCR-TR was a member party of Popular Democratic Unity (UDP). In 1984, the UDP was dissolved when PCR-TR and other organizations founded the Mariateguist Unified Party (PUM).

== See also ==
- Communist Party of India (Marxist–Leninist) Red Flag
- Communist Party – Red Star, in Peru
- Communist Party of Peru – Red Fatherland
- Peruvian Communist Party (Red Flag)
