= Communist Party of Peru – Red Fatherland =

Communist Party of Peru – Red Fatherland Partido Comunista del Perú – Patria Roja
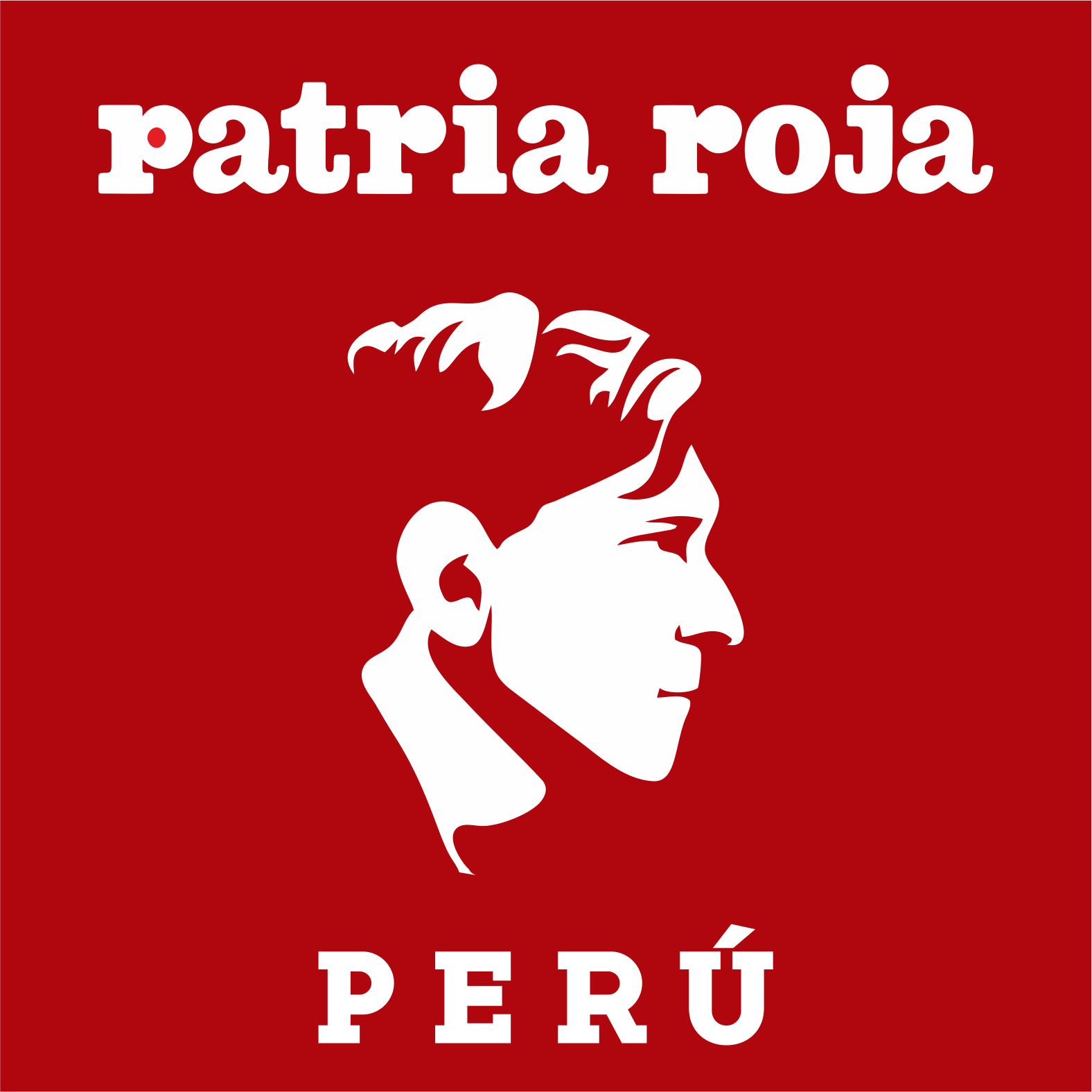
- Abbreviation: PCP-PR, PCdelP-PR
- President: Alberto Moreno
- General Secretary: Rolando Breña Pantoja
- Founded: 1970
- Split from: Peruvian Communist Party (Marxist–Leninist)
- Headquarters: Lima
- Youth wing: Juventud Comunista del Perú - Patria Roja (JOTACE)
- Ideology: Communism; Marxism–Leninism; Maoism; Mariáteguism; Anti-revisionism; Socialist patriotism
- Political position: Far-left
- National affiliation: Together for Peru (2017–2021)
- Regional affiliation: São Paulo Forum
- International affiliation: IMCWP; World Anti-Imperialist Platform

Website
- www.patriaroja.org.pe

The Communist Party of Peru – Red Fatherland (Spanish: Partido Comunista del Perú – Patria Roja, PCP-PR) is a far-left, Marxist-Leninist political party in Peru. It was founded in 1970, through a split in the Peruvian Communist Party – Red Flag. It is led by Alberto Moreno and Rolando Breña. Its youth wing is the Communist Youth of Peru.

In 1980 it participated in the general elections on the lists of UNIR. In the same year it became one of the founding organizations of the United Left (IU). After the downfall of IU, PCdelP-PR launched New Left Movement (MNI) as its electoral front. Currently PCdelP-PR is the major Marxist group in the country. It used to participate in the build-up of the Broad Left Front (FAI) and it is currently a member of the left-wing electoral coalition Together for Peru.

The general secretary of the party, Alberto Moreno, was the FAI candidate in the 2006 presidential elections.

The official organ of the Central Committee of the party is called Patria Roja.

== History ==
=== Background ===
José Carlos Mariátegui, a Peruvian Marxist from the early 20th century, founded the Peruvian Socialist Party in 1928. He embraced Marxism during his stay in Europe in the 1920s, and he is considered one of the main intellectuals of Latin American left-wing thought, known for his integral study of the Peruvian reality through dialectical materialism in his famous work Seven Interpretive Essays on Peruvian Reality.

Aside from organizing the Socialist Party of Peru, Mariátegui also supported the creation of the Workers' General Confederation of Peru (CGTP), as well as the Yanaconas Federation

After Mariátegui's death, Eudocio Ravines, following orders from the Soviet Union, renames the party to the Peruvian Communist Party (PCP). After the year 1930, the party started having problems with the different military dictatorships and right-wing governments, as well as with other political groupings of the age. It also had to confront the American Popular Revolutionary Alliance founded by Victor Raul Haya de la Torre, a socialist but openly anti-communist movement.

The PCP influenced with its idea to the CGTP, the Students Federation of Peru (FEP), various feminist and intersectionalist movements, supporting the fight for socialism in the world and the Soviet Union. However, during the 1950s and 1960s, the PCP, led by Jorge del Prado, is thought to have adopted more Eurocommunist and reformist positions which decreased its influence.

=== Origins and foundation ===
Former logo of the party, used until 2019

Controversies and the later split in the year 1963 between the Communist Party of the Soviet Union and the Chinese Communist Party, the Sino-Soviet split, ended up being one of the main reasons of the many schisms in the party. It held an important role in the IV National Conference in 1964, where the first big schism of the party would happen between a pro-Soviet faction and a pro-Maoist faction. This last faction breaks off the party to create its own, the Communist Party of Peru – Red Flag, a Maoist Communist party led by Saturnino Paredes. In that same period, different left-wing organizations appear, inspired by the success of Trotskyism, Fochism, the success of the Cuban Revolution and other liberation movements from colonized countries, meanwhile the original Peruvian Communist Party is led by Jorge del Prado.

In 1968 different organizations of the party, such as the Regional Committee of Ica, National Organization Committee and the Political-Military Committee Red Fatherland, join into a "National Committee of Reorganization" whose objective was to fight against the dogmatic direction the PCP-Red Flag was taking. This phase ends in the VI National Conference in 1969, where a group of anti-revisionist Marxists is expelled and, in 1970, those expelled members would end up forming Red Fatherland.

=== 2020 Peruvian protests ===
The party supported the 2020 Peruvian protests and the removal of Manuel Merino, and labelled the removal of Martín Vizcarra as a coup d'état by Congress.

== See also ==
- Communist Party – Red Star, in Peru
- Revolutionary Communist Party – Red Trench, in Peru
- Communism in Peru
- List of anti-revisionist groups

== Bibliography ==
- Adrianzén, Alberto, ed. (2011). Apogeo y Crisis de la Izquierda Peruana (PDF) (1 ed.). Strömsborg: IDEA Internacional. ISBN 978-91-86565-47-3.
- Torres, Javier (2011). "Mucha protesta, pocos cambios". In Rabinovich, Eleaonora; Magrini, Ana Lucía; Rincón, Omar (eds.). Vamos a Portarnos Mal. Protesta Social y Libertad de Expresión en América Latina. Bogotá: Friedrich-Ebert-Stiftung. ISBN 978-958-8677-05-7.
- Conger, Lucy; Inga, Patricia; Webb, Richard (2009). El árbol de la mostaza: historia de las microfinanzas en el Perú (PDF). Lima: Editorial Supergráfica S.R.L. ISBN 9789972607578.
- Mariátegui, Aldo (2015). El octavo ensayo (1 ed.). Lima, Peru: Planeta. ISBN 978-612-319-041-5.
