= Zevallos =

Zevallos may refer to:

== Surname ==
- Antonieta Zevallos de Prialé (1918/1919–2006), Peruvian politician
- Claudia Ortiz De Zevallos (born 1981), Peruvian model
- Fernando Zevallos (born 1957), Peruvian businessman
- Jaime Zevallos, Peruvian-American actor and writer
- Juan Zevallos (born 1990), Peruvian footballer
- Mariano Herencia Zevallos (1820–1884), Peruvian politician

== Places ==
- Zevallos, Guadeloupe, a settlement
