= Luis Negreiros =

Peruvian sociologist and politician

Luis Negreiros Criado
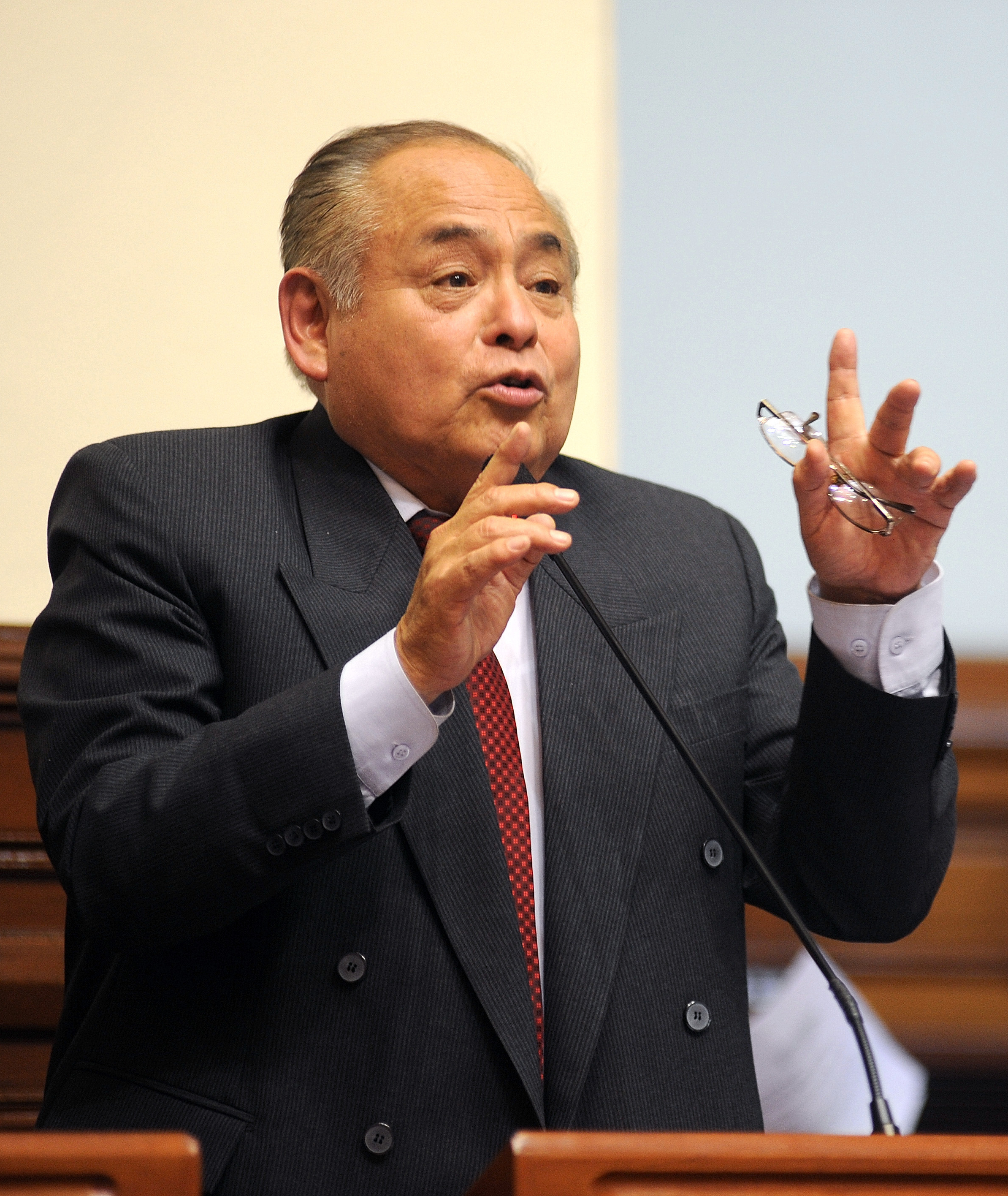
- Negreiros in 2010

Member of Congress
- In office 26 July 2001 – 26 July 2011
- Constituency: Callao

President of the Chamber of Deputies
- In office 26 July 1985 – 26 July 1986
- Preceded by: Elías Mendoza Habersperger
- Succeeded by: Fernando León de Vivero

Member of the Chamber of Deputies
- In office 26 July 1990 – 5 April 1992
- Constituency: Callao
- In office 26 July 1985 – 26 July 1990
- Constituency: Lima
- In office 26 July 1980 – 26 July 1985
- Constituency: Callao

Member of the Constituent Assembly
- In office 28 July 1978 – 13 July 1979
- Constituency: National

Personal details
- Born: Luis Alberto Negreiros Criado; 18 December 1940 (age 85) Lima, Peru
- Party: Peruvian Aprista Party
- Education: Universidad Nacional Federico Villarreal
- Profession: Sociologist

Luis Alberto Negreiros Criado (born December 18, 1940) is a Peruvian sociologist and politician. He was a former Congressman, representing Callao between 2001 and 2011 and belongs to the Peruvian Aprista Party.

== Education ==
He is the son of the Aprista union leader, Luis Negreiros Vega and Juana Criado Morales. His father was riddled with bullets by agents of the political police, in the middle of a public street during the dictatorship of General Manuel A. Odría on March 23, 1950.

He studied sociology and politics at the Federico Villarreal National University, located in Lima. He began these studies in 1967, although it is not known when he graduated.

== Career ==
From 1961 until 1993, even when exercised for public office, he specialized as a dockworker in Callao. From 1995 until 2001 was as Secretary of Foreign Affairs of the Federation Maritime Port.

== Political career ==
=== Negreiros and the APRA ===
Luis Negreiros has been a prominent member of Peruvian Aprista Party very young. With only 16 years he was the Secretary General of the Juventud Aprista Peruana for two years. From 1970 until 1979 he was the Collegiate Secretary General of the Party and in 1980 as an Undersecretary. Finally, in 1987, he was appointed as Secretary General of the Party, a position he held until 1989.

In the 1980 elections, he was the second running mate of Armando Villanueva in which the ticket was defeated by the ticket of Fernando Belaúnde Terry of the Popular Action.

After Victor Raul Haya de la Torre died, Negreiros was one of the natural leaders of the Peruvian Aprista Party but when the 1985 general election began, Alan Garcia was named as the candidate of the Peruvian Aprista Party, Negreiros moved away but eventually returned. In 2001, he reconciled with Garcia.

=== Congressional career ===
==== Constituent Assemblyman and Deputy ====
In the 1978 Constituent Assembly, he was elected as a member of Peruvian Aprista Party, standing alongside Victor Raul Haya de la Torre. From 1980 to 1992 he was a Member of the Chamber of Deputies. In 1985, he was elected by the Peruvian Chamber of Deputies as President of the Chamber of Deputies for a one-year term. His legislative work was cut short due to the self-coup of President Alberto Fujimori in 1992.

==== Congressman ====
In 2001, he was elected Member of the Congress of the Republic of Peru, returning after a nine-year absence, representing Callao, and was reelected in 2006, serving until 2011, when he unsuccessfully ran for re-election due to a low number of votes and subsequently retired from politics.
