= 1978 Peruvian Constituent Assembly election =

Constituent Assembly elections were held in Peru on 18 June 1978. The American Popular Revolutionary Alliance, led by Víctor Raúl Haya de la Torre, emerged as the largest party, winning 37 of the 100 seats.

The military dictatorship declared that it would respect the results of the election.

== Results ==
Party	Votes	%	Seats
American Popular Revolutionary Alliance	1,240,674	35.33	37
Christian People's Party	835,285	23.79	25
Worker Peasant Student and Popular Front	433,413	12.34	12
Revolutionary Socialist Party	232,520	6.62	6
Peruvian Communist Party	207,612	5.91	6
Popular Democratic Unity	160,741	4.58	4
National Front of Workers and Peasants	135,552	3.86	4
Christian Democrat Party	83,075	2.37	2
National Union Party	74,137	2.11	2
Pradist Democratic Movement	68,619	1.95	2
Socialist Revolutionary Action	20,164	0.57	0
Reformist Democratic Party	19,594	0.56	0
Total	3,511,386	100.00	100
Valid votes	3,511,386	84.15	
Invalid/blank votes	661,576	15.85	
Total votes	4,172,962	100.00	
Registered voters/turnout	4,978,831	83.81	
Source: PDBA

== See also ==
- Constituent Assembly (Peru)
