= Carlos Roca (politician) =

Peruvian politician

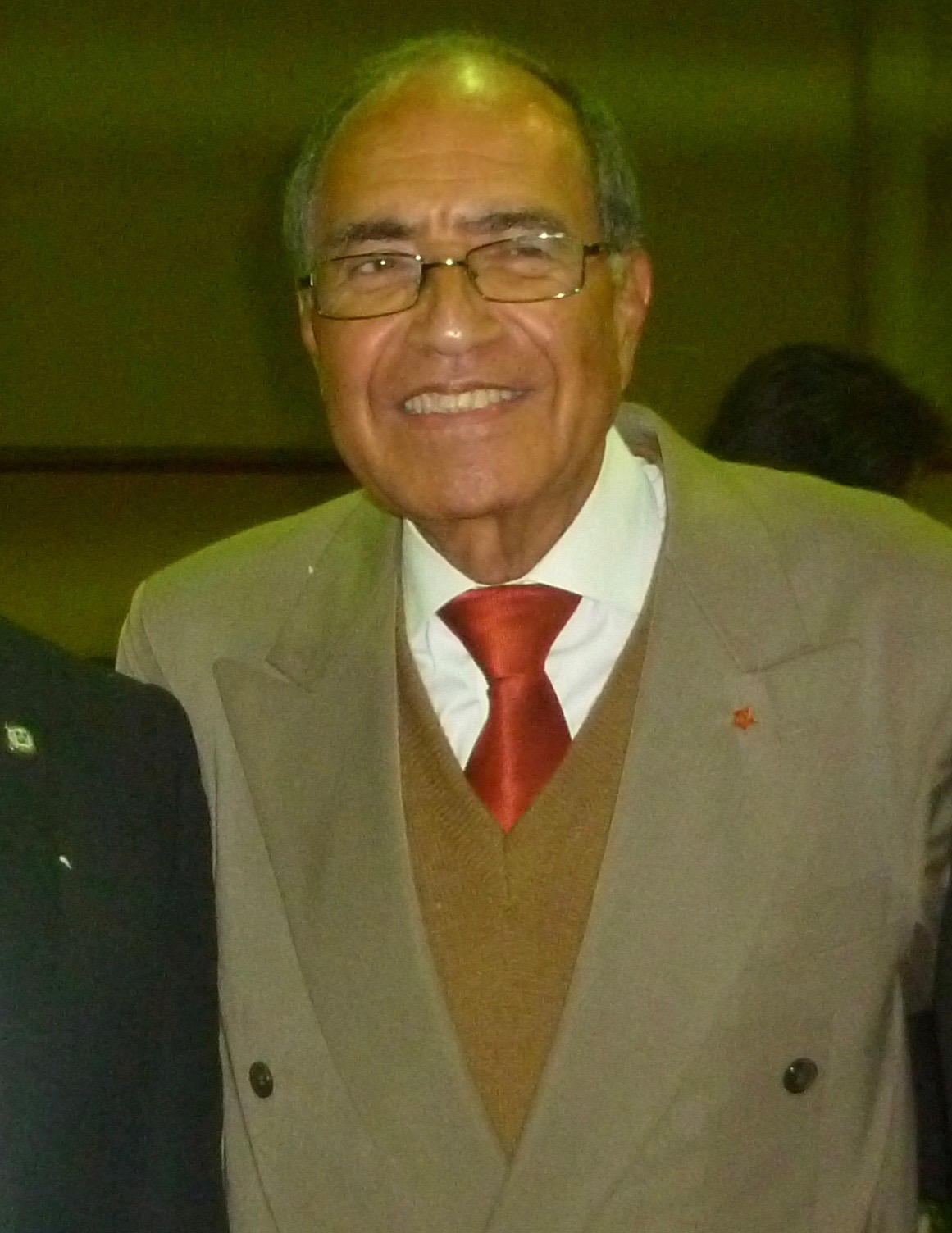

Ambassador of Peru to Italy
- In office 15 March 2006 – 17 February 2009
- Preceded by: Harold Forsyth
- Succeeded by: Rafael Rey

Member of the Chamber of Deputies
- In office 26 July 1980 – 5 April 1992
- Constituency: Lima

Member of the Constituent Assembly
- In office 28 July 1978 – 13 July 1979
- Constituency: National

Personal details
- Born: Carlos Roca Cáceres; 20 March 1946 (age 80) Lima, Peru
- Party: Peruvian Aprista Party
- Education: Pontifical Catholic University of Peru; University of Turin (BA)
- Occupation: Politician

Carlos Roca Cáceres (born 20 March 1946) is a Peruvian politician. A prominent member of the Peruvian Aprista Party, he was signaled in his youth as one of Víctor Raúl Haya de la Torre's main disciples, alongside future President of Peru, Alan García. In his political career, he served in the Constituent Assembly of 1978–1979, which drafted the Constitution of 1979, in the now-abolished Chamber of Deputies, and finally as Peruvian Ambassador to Italy, appointed in Alan García's second presidency.

Currently, Roca serves as Director of the Víctor Raúl Haya de la Torre House Museum. In the party, he served as National Secretary of International Affairs from 2010 to 2017.

== Early life and education ==
Born in Downtown Lima on 20 March 1946, he registered at 16 years old in the Peruvian Aprista Party after witnessing Víctor Raúl Haya de la Torre's "Veto Speech", in which the founder of the APRA denounced the military veto against his presidential nomination's first place in the election turnout in 1962.

After finishing his high school studies in the Breña District, he enrolled in the Pontifical Catholic University of Peru, finishing the humanities curriculum in 1963. He ultimately dropped out and travelled to Italy to finish this undergraduate degree at the University of Turin, graduating in 1969 with a bachelor's degree in political science.

== Political career ==
Upon the culmination of his degree, he went back to Peru to start a career in the Peruvian Aprista Party's youth wing. In 1970, he was selected among the most talented young members of the party to the National Bureau of Conjunctions, under Víctor Raúl Haya de la Torre's leadership. Alongside future party leader Alan García and Víctor Polay, he was considered a rising star in the party, and even as a long-term successor to Haya.

In 1978, he was elected to the Constituent Assembly. In his task of drafting a new Constitution, he personally assisted Haya, who served as President of the Assembly. Upon Haya's death in August 1979, Roca took a prominent role in his wake, propelling him as one of the party's future congressional nominees for the 1980 election.

In 1980, he was overwhelmingly elected to the lower house of the newly inaugurated Peruvian Congress, representing the Lima constituency with the Peruvian Aprista Party. That same year, he was appointed by the party's national convention as International Affairs Secretary. His rising figure in the party leadership would ultimately fade away with Alan García's election as Secretary-General in 1982.

Reelected to the Chamber of Deputies in 1985, he was not part Alan García's cabinet, solely serving in his position as congressman. He was reelected for a third term in 1990, although his term was interrupted in 1992 due to Alberto Fujimori's self-coup, which dissolved Congress.

Roca would try to regain his seat in Congress in 1995, but was not elected, obtaining a few share of votes as the Peruvian Aprista Party only gained 8 seats. He was selected as the party's nominee for Mayor of Lima for the 1998 election, placing third with 5% of the popular vote, losing to incumbent Mayor Alberto Andrade.

In 2001 and 2006, Roca unsuccessfully ran for Congress. In Alan García second administration, he was appointed Peruvian Ambassador to Italy, serving from 2006 to 2009.

In 2010, Roca was selected as the party's nominee for Mayor of Lima for a second time, but withdrew before the election. Since 2010, he has served as Director of the Víctor Raúl Haya de la Torre House Museum. From 2010 to 2017, he served once again as International Affairs Secretary.

He remains a loyal member of the party. His opinion is usually sought by the media relating to the Peruvian Aprista Party's history and its renovation. He is critical of the party's current internal crisis since before Alan García's suicide in 2019. He unsuccessfully ran for the party's leadership election in October 2019, losing to César Trelles Lara. His followers accused the electoral tribunal of fraud in favor of Trelles, although Roca remained hopeful of the party's recovery in popularity.

Following the Peruvian Aprista Party's failure to gain congressional seats in the 2020 parliamentary snap election, he criticized the controversial congressional nominations selected by the party's executive committee, blaming the poor results on the current leadership.
