= Jorge Torres Vallejo =

Peruvian politician

Jorge Bernardo Torres Vallejo (August 20, 1934 – November 26, 2007) was a Peruvian politician. Torres Vallejo was a member of APRA until 1988. He was elected Departmental General Secretary of APRA in La Libertad six times. At one point he served as national subsecretary of the party.

Torres Vallejo was the son of Antonio Torres Araujo and Graciela Vallejo Villalobos. His primary schooling was done at the Escuela de Aplicación, followed by secondary education at Colegio Nacional de San Juan. Torres Vallejo joined the APRA party at the age of fifteen. He went to Spain to study Regional Development at the Universidad de Alcalá de Henares.

A civil engineer and economist by profession, he served as Dean of the Engineering College of La Libertad. He served as mayor of Trujillo from 1967 to 1968. In 1968 he became president of the La Libertad Development Corporation. He also served as president of the Chamber of Commerce, Industry and Tourism of La Libertad (1975-1976). Torres Vallejo was elected to the Constituent Assembly in 1978. He again elected as mayor of Trujillo between 1980 and 1983. He was elected a senator in the 1985 general election. He obtained 110,032 preferential votes, becoming the fifth most voted APRA senator in the country. In parliament he was a proponent of decentralization. Torres Vallejo voiced opposition to Alan García's moves towards nationalization of the banking sector. Subsequently, he was expelled from the party. Torres Vallejo was the first prominent APRA leader to voice public criticism against García's presidency.

In 1996 and 2006 he contested the mayoral elections in Trujillo unsuccessfully.

Torres Vallejo was awarded the Order of the Liberator General San Martín by the government of Argentina.
