= Jorge Lozada Stanbury =

Peruvian politician (1931–2018)

Jorge Sixto Lozada Stanbury (6 April 1931 – 11 April 2018) was a Peruvian politician. He was elected to Congress from 1963 to 1965, served on the Constituent Assembly, and sat in the Senate from 1985 to 1992. He served as the President of the Senate in 1988. He belonged to the prominent Spanish Lozada family.
