= Colegio San José, Arequipa =

Colegio San José

Location
- Av. Alfonso Ugarte 977; Arequipa; Peru
- Coordinates: 16°25′28″S 71°33′18″W

Information
- Type: Private selective primary and secondary school
- Motto: Spanish: Ser más, para servir mejor (Be more, to serve better)
- Religious affiliation: Catholicism
- Denomination: Jesuits
- Established: 1898; 128 years ago
- Grades: Pre-K-12
- Colors: Red and black
- Mascot: Wolf
- Website: www.csj.edu.pe

Colegio San José is a private Catholic pre-school, primary and secondary school, located in Arequipa, Peru. The selective school was founded in 1898 by the Jesuits and excels in academics and athletics. As of 2013, Colegio San José was one of 22 (out of 2,439 schools in Peru), that received an "excellent" rating.

The school has the second largest campus of all the schools in Peru, and it is also the second oldest school in town, after Sagrados Corazones. The school currently competes with Colegio Anglo Americano Prescott, Lord Byron School, and Max Uhle School.

== History ==
The first Jesuit school in Arequipa was founded in 1578 under the name Colegio de Santiago but was soon closed by Viceroy Francisco de Toledo, who opposed the school. However, Toledo was deposed in 1581 and the school re-opened. It remained in operation until 1767, when Charles III of Spain expelled all Jesuits from Peru.

The present school opened in 1898 in the Plaza de Santa Marta. The name "Colegio San José" actually resulted from the confusion that followed when a school in Ecuador sent an oil painting to Arequipa as a gift and the packaging referred to the city San José, where a similar package had headed. The vice-provincial, Fr. Ildefonso del Olmo, S.J., assumed the reference indicated the chosen name of the new school. In 1956 the school moved to its present location on Avenida Alfonso Ugarte.

In 1966 a graduate student at Loyola University Chicago did a Master thesis on student values at the school.

== Voluntary service ==
In August 1998 the San Jose Voluntary Group was born, first serving at the Intensive Care Unit of Social Security, now Essalud. and then at Asilo Lira, Honorio Delgado Hospital, and Hogar de Cristo. This grew to 60 regular volunteers formed into 7 groups. By 2014 the volunteers were reaching out to seven different works.

== Alumni ==
The school has an alumni association called ASIA-San José, part of the Latin American Confederation of Jesuit Alumni. (ASIA is an acronym for the Latin Antiqui Societatis Iesu Alumni, or Society of Jesus Alumni.)

=== Notable alumni ===
- Víctor Andrés Belaúnde, President of the United Nations General Assembly (1959-1960)
- José Bustamante y Rivero, President of Peru (1945-1948) and president of the International Court of Justice at The Hague (1967-1969)

== See also ==
- Education in Peru
- List of Jesuit schools
