= Jorge del Prado Chávez =

Peruvian politician

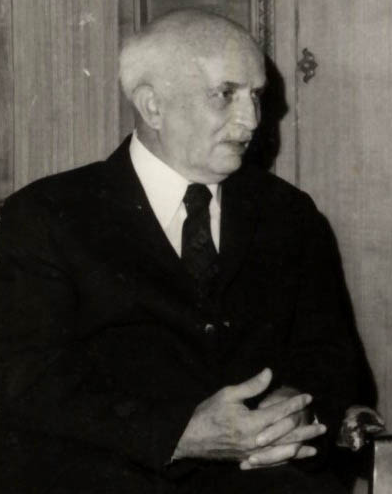
- Jorge del Prado in 1977

Secretary General of the Peruvian Communist Party
- In office 1966–1991
- Preceded by: Office established
- Succeeded by: Luis Villanueva Carbajal

Personal details
- Born: August 15, 1910 Arequipa, Peru
- Died: August 13, 1999 (aged 89) Lima, Peru
- Education: Colegio San José (Arequipa, Peru)
- Alma mater: Universidad de San Marcos (Lima, Peru)

Jorge del Prado Chávez (15 August 1910 – 13 August 1999) was a Peruvian politician.

He served as general secretary of the Peruvian Communist Party (PCP) from 1966 to 1991.

== Early life ==
Jorge del Prado Chávez was born on August 15, 1910, in the Yanahuara district of Arequipa, Peru. He was the son of Eleodoro del Prado and Carmen Chávez.

He did his primary schooling at the Colegio San José in Arequipa. He later studied journalism at Colegios de la Independencia Nacional also in Arequipa and the College of Our Lady of Guadalupe in Lima. He studied journalism at Universidad de San Marcos.

== Career ==
Before his political career, del Prado Chávez worked as painter, artist, and journalist.

Inspired by activist and future colleague José Carlos Mariátegui, he founded a revolutionary group in Arequipa in 1928 consisting of Marxist intellectuals and trade unionists. Shortly after that, in 1929, he quit his job as an artist and joined the Peruvian Communist Party as a full-time member.

He joined the PCP's Central Committee in 1931 and became its Secretary and a member of its Political Commission in 1942.

From 1958 until 1962, del Prado Chávez was the editor of the PCP's newspaper, Unidad. del Prado Chávez ran as a candidate with the National Liberation Front (FLN) in 1962. He was elected Secretary General of the PCP in 1966.

In the aftermath of the victory of the Cuban revolution and the Sino-Soviet split, del Prado Chávez remained firmly attached to the Soviet line. He discarding the possibility for an armed revolution in Peru under the existing conditions.

Del Prado Chávez stood as a candidate in several elections. He was elected as a member of the 1978 Constituent Assembly and again elected as senator in the 1980, 1985 and 1990 elections. In 1980 he contested on behalf of the Left Unity (UI). In 1985 he stood as a United Left candidate, obtaining 183,022 votes. In 1990 he again contested on behalf of IU. He retired from his position as general secretary of the PCP and was succeeded by Luis Villanueva Carbajal.

Del Prado Chávez wrote several books about the communist and labour movements of Peru. He was the author of three books on Mariátegui.

== Death and legacy ==
Jorge del Prado Chávez died on August 13, 1999, at Almenara Hospital in Lima.

Throughout his lifetime, del Prado Chávez received various international orders and medals. His most notable ones include:

- Order of Georgi Dimitrov (Bulgaria)
- Marx Medal (German Democratic Republic)
- Order of Friendship of Peoples (Soviet Union)
- Order of the 40th Anniversary of the Defeat of Fascism (Czechoslovakia)
