= Alan García =

President of Peru from 1985–1990 and 2006–2011

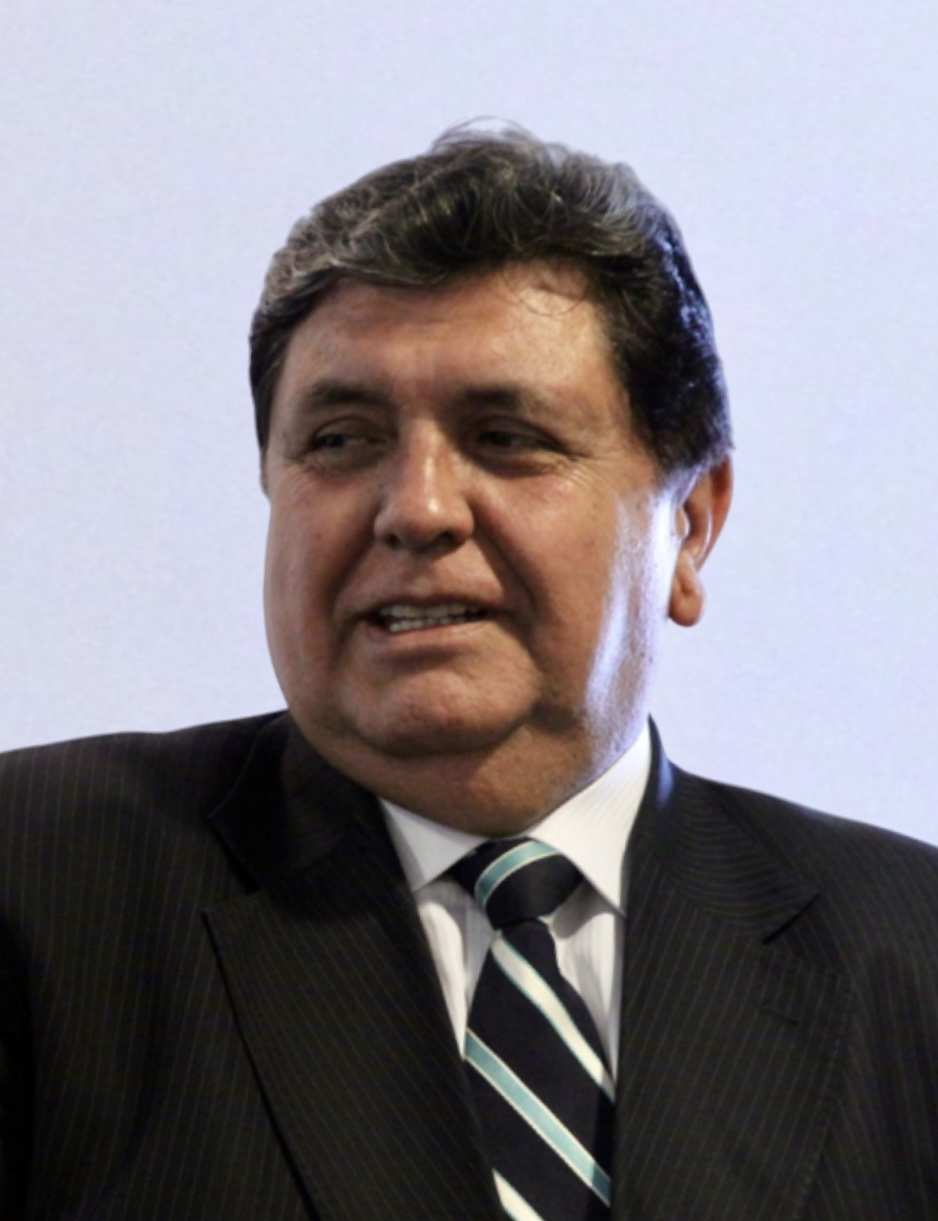
- García in 2011

President of Peru
- In office 28 July 2006 – 28 July 2011
- Prime Minister: Jorge Del Castillo; Yehude Simon; Javier Velásquez; José Antonio Chang; Rosario Fernández
- Vice President: Luis Giampietri; Lourdes Mendoza
- Preceded by: Alejandro Toledo
- Succeeded by: Ollanta Humala
- In office 28 July 1985 – 28 July 1990
- Prime Minister: Luis Alva Castro; Guillermo Larco Cox; Armando Villanueva; Luis Alberto Sánchez
- Vice President: Luis Alberto Sánchez; Luis Alva Castro
- Preceded by: Fernando Belaúnde
- Succeeded by: Alberto Fujimori

Senator for Life
- In office 28 July 1990 – 5 April 1992
- Constituency: Former Constitutional President of the Republic

Member of the Chamber of Deputies
- In office 26 July 1980 – 26 July 1985
- Constituency: Lima

Member of the Constituent Assembly
- In office 28 July 1978 – 13 July 1979

President of the Peruvian Aprista Party
- In office 7 June 2004 – 17 April 2019
- Preceded by: Position reestablished
- Succeeded by: César Trelles
- In office 15 July 1985 – 23 December 1988
- Preceded by: Position established
- Succeeded by: Position abolished

General Secretary of the Peruvian Aprista Party
- In office 15 February 1992 – 24 May 1993
- Preceded by: Luis Alva Castro
- Succeeded by: Armando Villanueva
- In office 9 October 1982 – 15 July 1985
- Preceded by: Fernando León de Vivero
- Succeeded by: Armando Villanueva

Personal details
- Born: Alan Gabriel Ludwig García Pérez; 23 May 1949 Lima, Peru
- Died: 17 April 2019 (aged 69) Lima, Peru
- Cause of death: Suicide by gunshot
- Party: Peruvian Aprista
- Other political affiliations: Popular Alliance (2015–2016)
- Height: 1.94 m (6 ft 4 in)
- Spouses: Carla Buscaglia (divorced); Pilar Nores (m. 1978)
- Children: 6
- Education: National University of San Marcos (LLB); Complutense University of Madrid; Paris 1 Panthéon-Sorbonne University; University of San Martín de Porres (MA)

Alan Gabriel Ludwig García Pérez (Note: In this name that follows Hispanic American naming customs, the first or paternal surname is García and the second or maternal family name is Pérez.) (Latin American Spanish: [ˈalaŋ‿ɡaβˈɾjel luðˈwiɣ‿ɣaɾˈsi.a ˈpeɾes]; 23 May 1949 – 17 April 2019) was a Peruvian politician who served as President of Peru for two non-consecutive terms, from 1985 to 1990 and from 2006 to 2011. He was the second leader of the American Popular Revolutionary Alliance (APRA), and its only member to serve as president. Mentored by the APRA's founder, Víctor Raúl Haya de la Torre, he served in the Constituent Assembly of 1978–1979. Elected to the Peruvian Congress in 1980, he rose to the position of General Secretary of the APRA in 1982, and was elected to the presidency in 1985 in a landslide.

García's first presidential term was marked by a severe economic crisis, social unrest, corruption, and violence. At its conclusion, he was accused and investigated for corruption and illicit enrichment. In 1992, he filed for asylum following president Alberto Fujimori's self-coup, and exiled himself with his family in Colombia and France for nine years. In the aftermath of Fujimori's downfall, he made a political comeback as he ran for the presidency in 2001, but lost in the second round to Alejandro Toledo. In 2006, he was again elected president, defeating Ollanta Humala, a feat considered a political resurrection due to the failure of his first term.

Throughout García's second term, Peru experienced a steady economy, becoming Latin America's fastest-growing country in 2008, surpassing China in terms of rising GDP. This economic success was acclaimed as a triumph by world leaders, and poverty declined from 48% to 28% nationally. In addition, Peru signed free trade agreements with the United States and China during García's presidency, but accusations of corruption persisted throughout his term and beyond. He was succeeded by Humala in 2011. He withdrew from party politics after failing to advance to the second round of the 2016 general election, placing fifth in his bid for a third presidential term under the Popular Alliance coalition between his party and the Christian People's Party, which included former rival Lourdes Flores as one of his running mates. On 17 April 2019, García died from a self-inflicted gunshot to the head as police officers under a prosecutor's orders were preparing to arrest him over matters relating to the Odebrecht scandal.

García is considered one of Peru's most controversial yet talented politicians. He was known as an immensely charismatic orator, but a 2017 poll of Peruvians named García and his government the most corrupt.

== Early life ==
Born in the Maison de Santé Clinic of the Barranco District into a middle-class family, García met his father for the first time when he was five due to his father's imprisonment at El Sexto Prison for being a member of the Peruvian Aprista Party. His mother founded the party's base in the Camaná Province of the Arequipa Region. From a very young age, he accompanied his father to party meetings and became acquainted with future leaders of the American Popular Revolutionary Alliance (APRA), such as Luis Alva Castro and Mercedes Cabanillas. At age 14, he was already an immensely talented orator when he first gave a speech in honour of party founder Víctor Raúl Haya de la Torre, whom he admired and followed until his death.

García studied law, first at the Pontifical Catholic University of Peru and later earning a bachelor's degree from the National University of San Marcos in 1971. A year later, he left Peru for Spain, where he pursued a doctoral degree in constitutional law under the guidance of Manuel Fraga. For years García claimed to have earned the degree; in 2014, however, documents from the university proved he never finished the work for it. In 1974, he moved to France with other members of the APRA to study at the Sorbonne Nouvelle University Paris 3 and the Institut des Hautes Etudes de l'Amérique latine (IHEAL). After earning a diploma in sociology from IHEAL, he was called by Víctor Raúl Haya de la Torre to come back to Peru in order to run for the Constituent Assembly election in 1978. García was elected a Member of the Assembly, where he impressed his colleagues with his oratory and skillful rhetoric. As APRA's Secretary of Organization, he was assigned to conduct the party's public affairs in the wake of Haya de la Torre's death in 1979.

From his first marriage, García had one daughter, Carla, who is also active in Peruvian politics since 2014. With his second wife Pilar Nores, from whom he separated in 2010, García had four children. He also had another child from an extramarital affair with economist Roxanne Cheesman.

García was elected to Congress in 1980. Two years later, he was elected General Secretary of the Peruvian Aprista Party. He was elected to serve as president of the Republic in the 1985 general elections.

== First presidency (1985–1990) ==
García won the presidential election on 14 April 1985 with 45% of the votes. Since he did not receive the 50% of the votes required for a first-round victory, a runoff was scheduled between him and Alfonso Barrantes (the former mayor of Lima) of the United Left party. However, Barrantes withdrew from the runoff, saying he did not want to prolong the country's political uncertainty. García was thus declared President on 1 June and took power on 28 July. For the first time in its 60-year history, the APRA party came to power in Peru. Aged 36, García was dubbed "Latin America's Kennedy", becoming the region's youngest president at the time and the second-youngest president in Peruvian history (the youngest was Juan Crisostomo Torrico in 1842, aged 34).

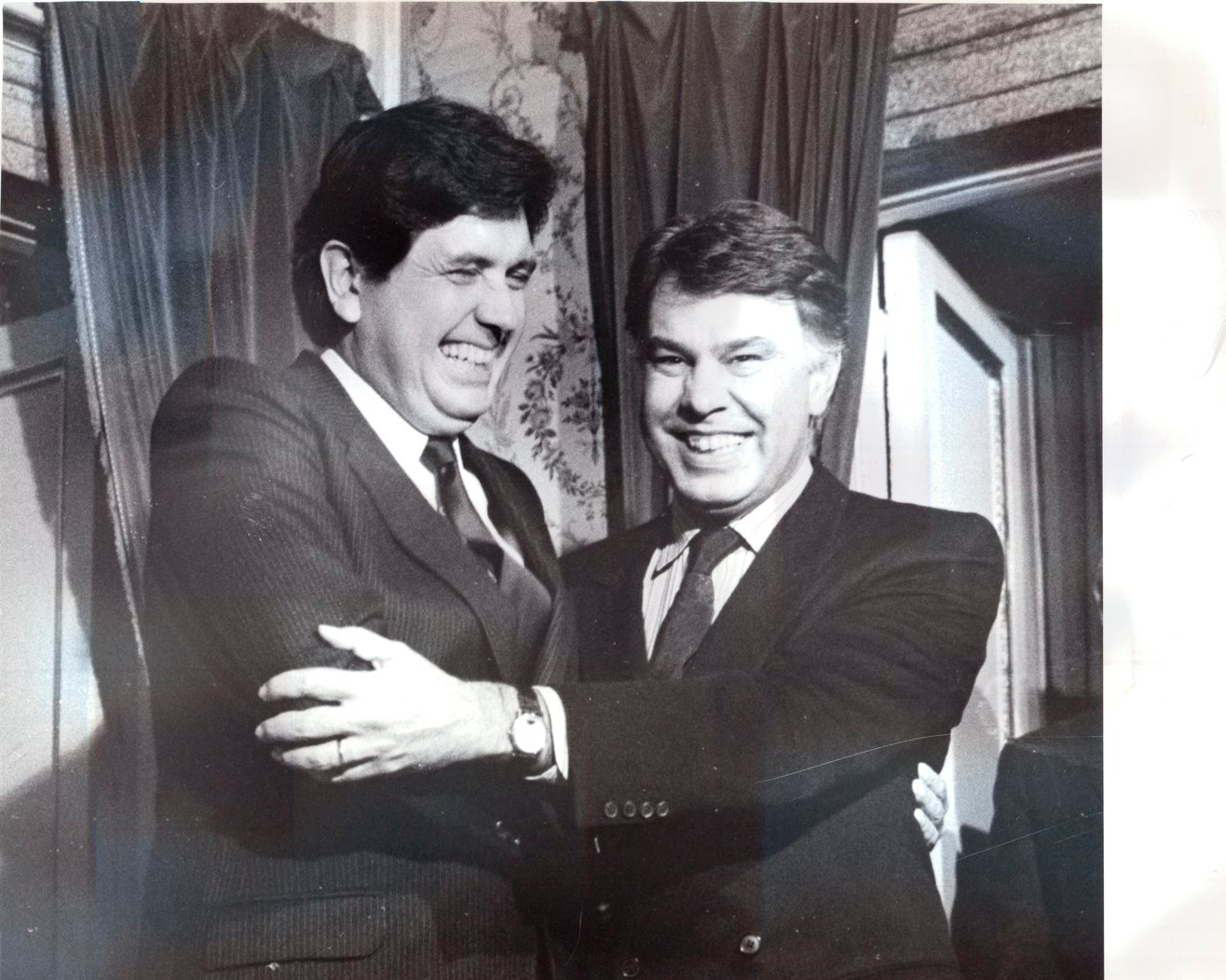
Alan García and Spanish Prime Minister Felipe González at Moncloa Palace, January 1987.

His economic policy was based on APRA's initial anti-imperialist values. García distanced Peru from international markets, resulting in lower investment in the country. Despite his initial popularity among voters, García's term in office was marked by bouts of hyperinflation, which reached 7,649% in 1990 and had a cumulative total of 2,200,200% over five years, destabilizing the Peruvian economy. Foreign debt under García's administration increased to $19 billion by 1989. Owing to this chronic inflation, the Peruvian currency, the sol, was replaced by the inti in February 1985 (before his presidency began), which itself was replaced by the nuevo sol ("new sun") in July 1991, at which time the new sol had a cumulative value of one billion (1,000,000,000) old soles.

According to studies by the National Institute of Statistics and Informatics and the United Nations Development Programme, around the start of his presidency, 41.6% of Peruvians lived in poverty. During his presidency, this increased to 55% in 1991. García also attempted to nationalise the banking and insurance industries. The International Monetary Fund and the financial community recoiled after García's administration unilaterally declared a limit on debt repayment equal to 10% of the Gross National Product, thereby isolating Peru from international financial markets.

His presidency was marked by corruption and world-record hyperinflation, with the annual rate exceeding 13,000%. The administration devastated the local economy as well as all governmental institutions. Hunger, corruption, injustice, abuse of power, partisan elitism, and social unrest rose to dramatic levels throughout the nation due to García's misdeeds and incompetence, spurring terrorism. The economic turbulence exacerbated social tensions and contributed in great part to the rise of the violent Maoist rebel movement known as the Shining Path, which launched the internal conflict in Peru and began attacking electrical towers, causing a number of blackouts in Lima. The period also saw the emergence of the Túpac Amaru Revolutionary Movement (MRTA). The García administration unsuccessfully sought a military solution to the growing terrorism, allegedly committing human rights violations, which are still under investigation. These include the Accomarca massacre, where 47 campesinos were gunned down by armed forces in August 1985; the Cayara massacre (May 1988), in which some 30 people were killed and dozens disappeared; and the summary execution of more than 200 inmates during prison riots in Lurigancho, San Juan Bautista (El Frontón) and Santa Bárbara in 1986. According to an official inquiry, an estimated 1,600 forced disappearances took place during García's presidency. His own personal involvement in these events is not clear. García was allegedly tied to the paramilitary Rodrigo Franco Command, which is accused of carrying out political murders in Peru during his presidency. A U.S. declassified report, written in late 1987, said that APRA and top government officials were running a paramilitary group responsible for the attempted bombing of the El Diario newspaper, then linked to Shining Path, had sent people to train in North Korea, and may have been involved in executions. According to investigative journalist Lucy Komisar, the report made clear that García had given the orders.

García's historical economic failures were used by economists Rudi Dornbusch and Sebastian Edwards to coin the term macroeconomic populism. Because of García's unpopularity by the end of his first term, at his farewell speech on 28 July 1990 he was booed by the entire opposition forces and almost prevented from speaking. The opposition forces slammed their folders in their desks to interrupt García. Some opposition members even left the congress. The event was televised.

Later that day, the board of the Chamber of Deputies requested the creation of a special committee to investigate García's presidency, accusing him of massive corruption and illicit enrichment. The committee attacked García with numerous proven accusations involving embezzlement, misappropriation and bribery, based on—among other sources—a U.S. congressional investigation that linked him to the BCCI scandal and had found millions of illicitly obtained dollars in BCCI as well as other banks.

In 1991, New York District Attorney Robert Morgenthau charged García officially. Later in 1992, then-U.S. Senator John Kerry presided over the BCCI scandal report, which concluded García was not only guilty of corruption but directly involved in an international racketeering network with activities that included drug and arms trafficking. Finally, the Peruvian Supreme Court declared null all the probes and constitutional accusations gathered against García, allowing him to return to Peru after a 9-year self-imposed exile.

== Exile ==
On 5 April 1992, Alberto Fujimori conducted a self-coup, whereby he dissolved the Peruvian Congress unconstitutionally and intervened in the Judiciary and other public institutions. Various politicians were persecuted and prevented from leaving their homes. García had been serving as Senator for life since 1990, although he was unable to perform his duty due to the accusations of the Chamber of Deputies. On 18 October 1991, the Senate debated the proposal made by the lower house to indict García for crimes of illicit enrichment and against the public faith, allegedly committed when he was performing public functions. The Senate suspended García from the exercise of his functions as senator for life and put him on trial for alleged illicit enrichment during his presidential term with 38 votes in favor and 17 against. He was able to return to the Senate in March 1992, after the Supreme Court dropped all constitutional charges against him. According to Jorge Del Castillo in 2008, Fujimori ordered Vladimiro Montesinos to capture and assassinate García on the day of the coup. According to his own testimony, García escaped his home while military tanks took over the bloc where he lived.

After weeks of hiding in a construction site, he was able to enter the residence of the Colombian Ambassador at the end of May, where he requested political asylum. The request was granted on 1 June by the government of President César Gaviria. García left Peru through a pass that allowed him to board a Colombian Air Force jet that transferred him to Bogotá, along with then congressman Jorge Del Castillo. García arrived at Catam military airport and in statements to the press promised to fight Fujimori's dictatorship. The regime opened judicial processes to investigate illicit enrichment and accusations of corruption; after that, García's extradition was requested from the Colombian government, but was denied.

In 1994, the Human Rights Commission of the Organization of American States denounced the Fujimori government for violation of the rights to liberty, security and due defense of García and asked the Peruvian government to nullify the processes initiated.

In April 1995, Congress lifted García's parliamentary immunity in response to accusations that he had taken bribes from the Italian consortium Tralima for the construction of the Lima Metro. Based on this, the Civil Sector of the Supreme Court again requested García's extradition from Colombia, which was denied because García went to live in Paris for the rest of his exile.

Between 1993 and 2001, García did not actively participate in Peruvian politics, except in the publication of some works on his first presidency, and a literary work, El Mundo de Maquiavelo (The World of Machiavelli). He continued denouncing the human rights violations committed by the Fujimori administration. On rare occasions, he appeared on Peruvian television and radio from Bogotá.

In 2001, the Supreme Court declared the allegations that were imputed to him at the end of his first term had been annulled.

== Return to politics ==
=== 2001 Peruvian national election ===
Alan García returned to Lima on 27 January 2001, at 5:35pm. His return caused so much anticipation that a huge crowd of supporters was waiting for him at the airport chanting his name and showing support with hundreds of signs with the words "ALAN VUELVE". That same day at 8:30pm a rally was called in the Plaza San Martin de Lima where Garcia gave a speech in front of a large crowd. Some say there were around 20,000 people that night. Garcia ran for president in the new elections called by the interim president Valentín Paniagua, and in a 60-day election campaign he finished in second place in the first round behind Alejandro Toledo, qualifying him for the second round. Toledo's popularity remained stable, while Garcia's popularity was based on his innovative proposals on the issue of the agrarian bank, not continuing with a neoliberal model, etc. However, it was not enough to acquire more endorsements and support from Peruvian voters and Alejandro Toledo won the general elections in the second round with 53.1% of the vote against Garcia's 46.9%. After the 2001 election, Garcia, as leader of the APRA party, became Leader of the Opposition.

=== 2006 Peruvian national election ===
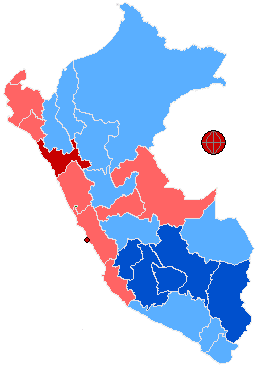
Geographic distribution of second-round votes in the 2006 election, by winning candidate. Alan García, >2/3 of valid votes Alan García, <2/3 of valid votes Ollanta Humala, >2/3 Ollanta Humala, <2/3

García officially started his campaign for the April 2006 presidential election in Lima on 20 April 2005. Ollanta Humala won the first round with 32.50% of the valid votes, followed by García, who got 24.32% (against Lourdes Flores' 23.81%). As no candidate won a majority, a run-off election was held on 4 June 2006 between Humala and García. Preliminary official results gave García an advantage over his run-off opponent, who conceded defeat.

On 28 April 2006, prior to the run-off, García had become involved in a dispute with Venezuelan President Hugo Chávez. For the second time in Peruvian presidential election, Chávez declared his support for Ollanta Humala, García's opponent, and referred to García as a "robber", a "bandit", and "the Carlos Andrés Pérez of Peru". In response, García stated that Chávez was "not acting as a statesman" and challenged Chávez to a debate to be hosted by CNN. García called on the Organization of American States to intervene in the matter.

On 31 May 2006, a few days before the run-off election, García's economic adviser Enrique Cornejo told the media that if García won in the second round, his government would renew a US$422 million aid package with the International Monetary Fund. Anoop Singh, the IMF's Western Hemisphere Director, responded positively by saying he was "impressed by the vision of the president-elected for Peru, especially his commitment to applying prudent economic policy."

== Second presidency (2006–2011) ==
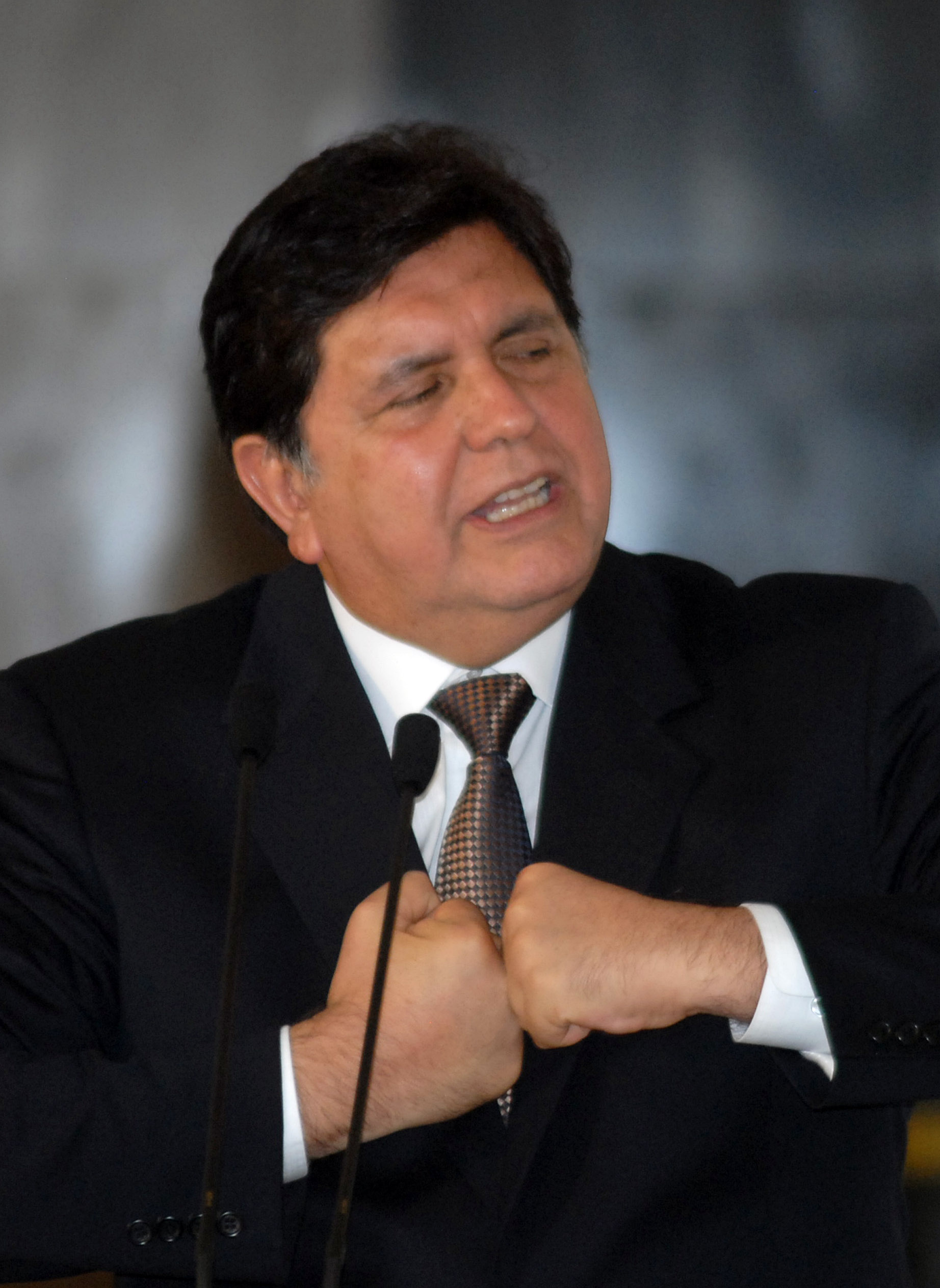
Alan García in Brasilia right after winning his second presidency.

On 28 July 2006, García was sworn in as president, after winning approximately 53% of the nationwide vote in the elections held on 4 June against Ollanta Humala. He would spend the majority of his second term attempting to improve his reputation compared to his first term.

He won in the capital city, Lima, and the northern coast, a geographical base of the APRA party, but lost in the southern region (mostly impoverished but including major cities such as Cuzco and Arequipa) and the rainforest areas, considered Humala's strongholds. A third of the voters said that voting for him was "voting for the lesser of two evils": although many Peruvians had a very negative impression of García after his first term, they were frightened by rumours that Humala would create a government based on Fidel Castro's Cuba and would turn Hugo Chávez, President of Venezuela, into the virtual ruler of Peru, due to Chavez's patronage of Humala's party. These fears were accompanied by declarations of militarization, the re-introduction of the death penalty and criminalization and disrespect for LGBT communities. Humala denied these rumours, but his conflicting statements about his government's vision and Chávez's strong campaigning for him created enough suspicions among voters to cost him the ballotage. With 36 seats, APRA was the second largest bloc in the 120-seat unicameral Congress which was sworn in a couple of days before the President. With 45 seats, Humala's Union for Peru Party, although divided into three factions, was the largest bloc.

On 28 June, one month before García was sworn in, his party provided 25 of the 79 votes, nearly a third, ratifying the Peru–United States Trade Promotion Agreement in the Peruvian Congress. This was a month prior to the new legislature that would include the Union for Peru congressmen, who opposed the agreement with the USA. The U.S. Congress ratified the agreement on 4 December 2007; it came into effect on 1 February 2009.

In his first speech as president, García declared he would appoint a Finance Minister who was neither "an orthodox market liberal" nor a person "excessively in favour of state intervention in the economy". The position of prime minister was given to Jorge Del Castillo. According to the BBC, in private interviews García had stated his interest in a possible future trade agreement with Brazil, and considered himself "an admirer" of Brazilian President Lula da Silva.

In press conferences with the foreign press, García acknowledged that the support Humala received in the election "could not be ignored". García, in a recognition of future domestic politics with a UPP-controlled Congress, was quoted as saying "Mr. Humala is an important political figure, and a President should consult with different political factions". However, Humala said he wouldn't salute the winner personally, adding that "he and his party will constitute the principal opposition bloc, not to fight Mr. García, but to defend the interests of the State and watch the government".

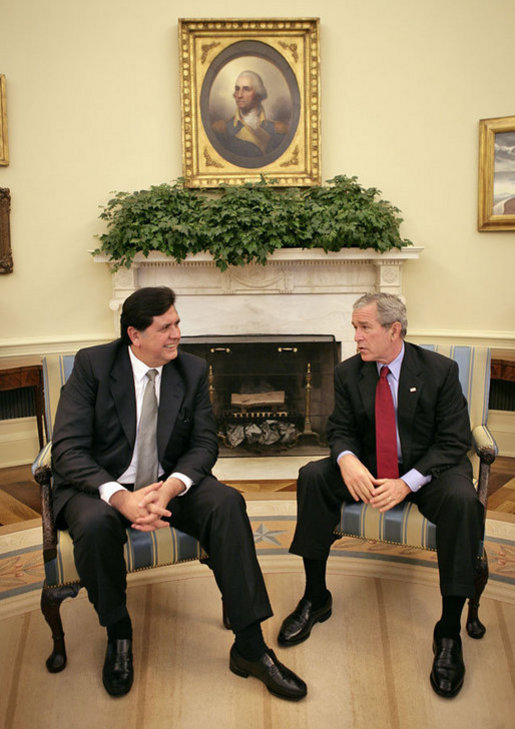
Alan García and George W. Bush at the White House in October 2006.

President Chávez of Venezuela responded to García's comments on his show Aló Presidente by stating that it was García who owed him an apology, saying: "the only way relations between the two countries can be restored is if Peru's elected President [García] gives an explanation and offers an apology to the Venezuelan people. He started throwing stones". Chávez questioned the legitimacy of the election, citing 1.2 million invalid ballots and a margin of victory of 600,000 votes, although offering no evidence for his comments. García, invited to meet Brazilian president Lula da Silva, responded to Chávez: "Accept your defeat in silence. Don't ask me to apologize for something arising from interference and remarks that are unacceptable under international law." Differences with Chávez were left behind after the two ended their dispute at the second South American Community of Nations Summit.

On 20 July 2006, García named Luis Carranza, a former executive at Spain-based Banco Bilbao Vizcaya Argentaria and Central Bank director and deputy finance chief from August 2004 to August 2005 in Alejandro Toledo's government, as finance minister. The appointment was welcomed by some critics of García's fiscal policies during his first administration. However, Mario Huamán Rivera, the President of the Confederación General de Trabajadores del Perú (General Workers Confederation of Peru), the country's largest trade union, attacked the appointment, stating that "it looks as though Alan García is not going to fulfill his promise to change economic policy".

On the day before his inauguration, García formally named his cabinet, including former Secretary-General of the APRA party and re-elected Congressman Jorge del Castillo as prime minister, Luis Carranza as minister of finance and economy, and José Antonio García Belaúnde as foreign affairs minister. García was inaugurated as president on 28 July 2006.

During his campaign, García had declared that he supported the death penalty for rapists of minors; he reiterated this stance while in office, pushing a law on the issue, which would modify the criminal code. Although the issue seemed to be stalled, García widened the range of his proposal for the death penalty by including terrorists in the list of those who could receive it.

García faced his first major political defeat of his second term in office on 11 January 2007, when his proposal to introduce the death penalty as a punishment for captured Shining Path rebels was rejected by the congress in a vote of 49 to 26. García had promised to introduce the death penalty for Shining Path rebels during the 2006 Presidential election. Following the defeat of the proposal, he suggested a national referendum on the issue, but it was blocked by Congress. Legislators who voted against the bill stated that it would be a breach of the American Convention on Human Rights, to which Peru is a signatory. Approximately 3,000 supporters of the proposal marched in Lima, holding up photos of victims of attacks by the Shining Path.

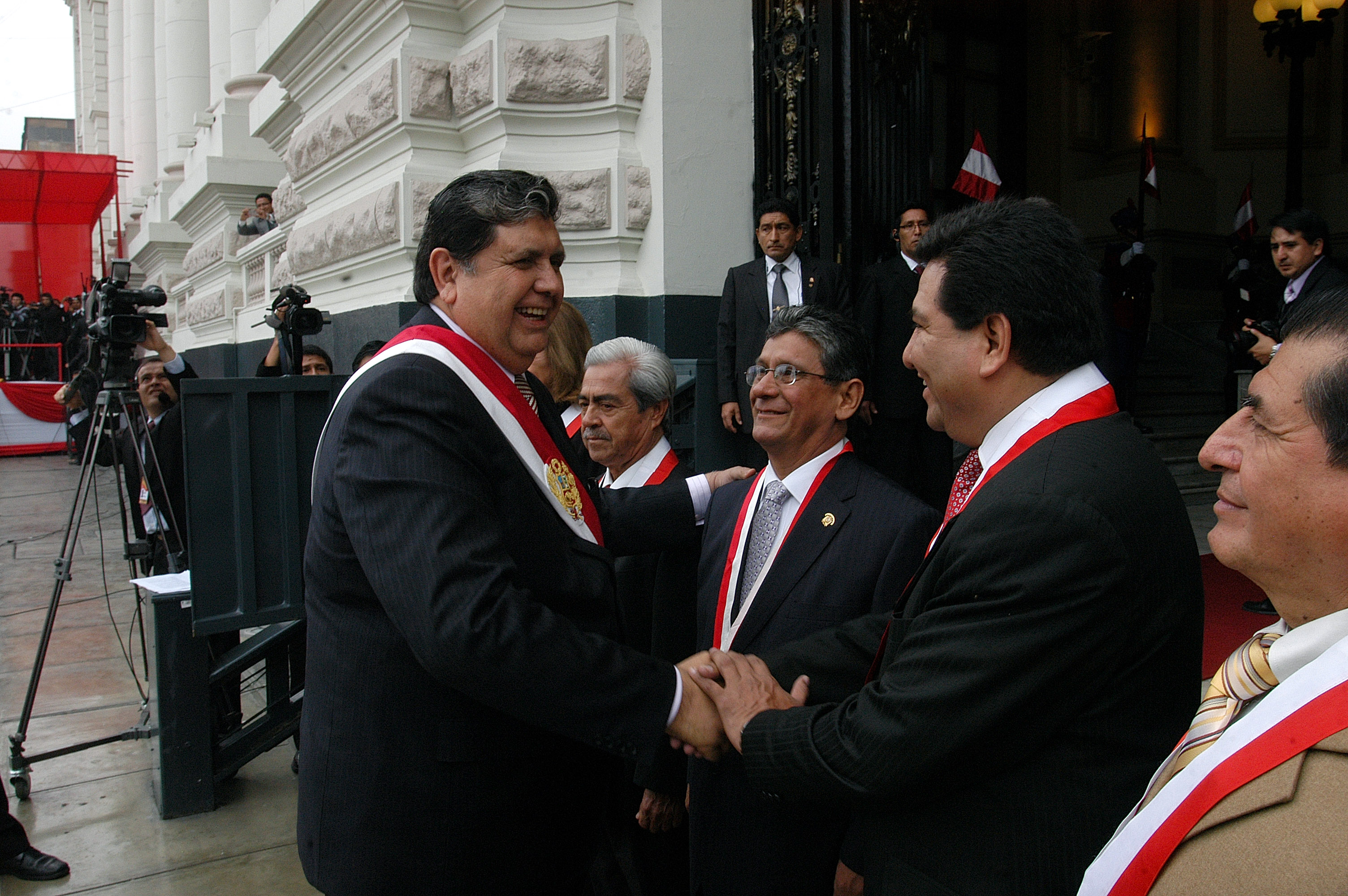
The 189th anniversary of Peru's independence from Spain in July 2010

On 5 June 2009, García ordered police and military forces to stop Amazonian indigenous protesters from blocking roads in the Bagua region. They had been demonstrating against the signing by Alan García of special decrees that allowed foreign corporations to enter Indigenous lands for oil drilling, mining and logging. As a result of the protests and armed military incursion, more than 100 native civilians and 14 policemen were killed. The government claimed, in a redacted television commercial, that several policemen were killed after being taken prisoner, while protesters claimed the bodies of the murdered Native Amazonians had been dumped into the river.

With the passage of time, studies of human rights violations in Peru have discovered a close relationship between García and forces within Peru who promote impunity for human rights violators, through his involvement in appointing judges who would be sympathetic to perpetrators of human rights violations. García was also supportive of efforts to punish judges who handed down indictments of perpetrators. García himself was in the presidency during many gross violations of human rights and was quite hostile to human rights organizations and to judicial actors who sought justice for victims of human rights violations. During his presidency, García sought to tilt the legal playing field in favour of the military and against victims. He also tried to make life difficult for NGOs seeking to help victims: he offered extensive resources to defendants and military officers, while creating new laws that would make it difficult for human rights NGOs to do their jobs, receive necessary resources, and pursue the advancement of judicial action that attempted to bring human rights violators to justice.

=== Foreign affairs ===
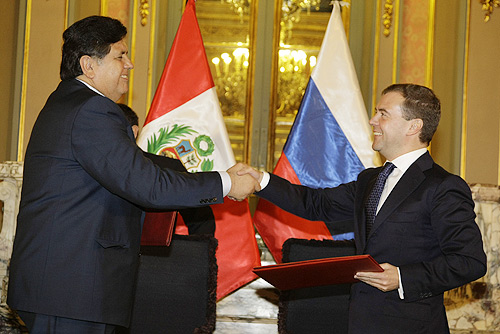
García with President of Russia Dmitry Medvedev in Lima on 24 November 2008

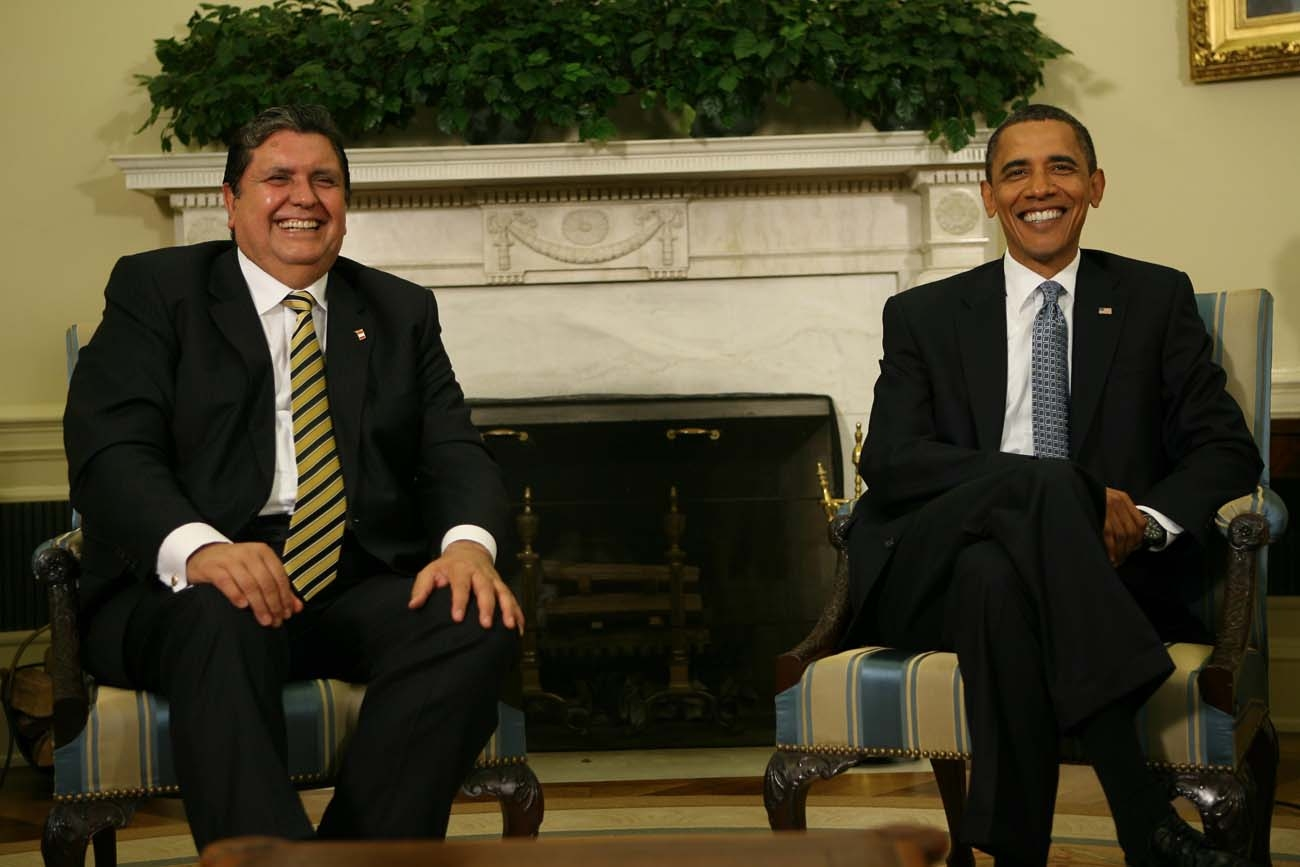
García with President of the United States Barack Obama in Washington, D.C., on 1 June 2010

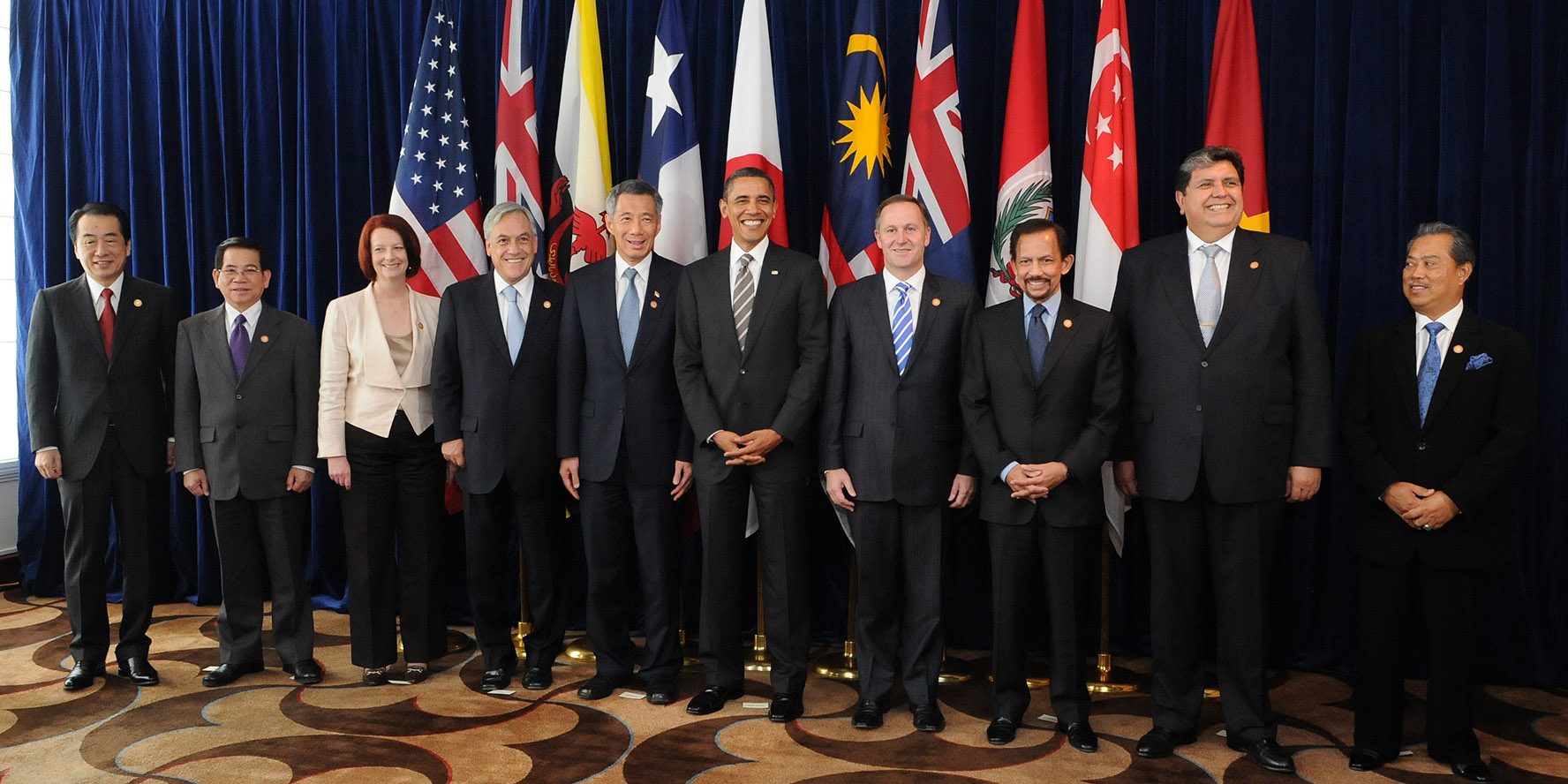
Leaders of the Trans-Pacific Partnership member states in 2010

After being elected, in the months prior to his inauguration, García sought to heal Peru's relationship with Chile, strained by the differences between the governments of Alejandro Toledo and Ricardo Lagos and severely impaired by former President Alberto Fujimori's extradition affair. García's intentions were well received by Michelle Bachelet, President of Chile, as she and García met and struck some preliminary agreements. These conversations eventually led to the final draft of a landmark economic agreement with Chile a month after García was sworn in.

On 9 November 2006, three months after being inaugurated, García signed 12 commercial agreements with President Luiz Inácio Lula da Silva of Brazil, strengthening the relationship between the two countries. As part of the IIRSA programme and continuing integration efforts – including the August 2006 negotiations between Petrobras and Petroperú – these new agreements sought to further bilateral cooperation. García offered Peruvian hydropower to meet Brazil's growing energy needs, although further details were not disclosed.

== Post-presidency (2011–2019) ==
García, as he offered during the 2011 electoral campaign, made himself available to the new Head of State to serve the interests of Peru in the manner required.

In addition, he also dedicated himself to writing opinion articles, mainly on his internal and external vision, primarily aimed at reducing poverty in Peru, increasing foreign investment and issues related to the growth of the Peruvian economy with social sensitivity.

The salary increase for ministers carried out in February 2014 was harshly criticized by the former president, who during his government cut the salary of his Cabinet members by half, which, according to official spokesmen, caused a talent drain of the state apparatus. Through his Twitter account, he described the measure as "the great deal."

García ran for a third term as president in the 2016 Peruvian general election as the candidate of the criticized Popular Alliance coalition which included APRA's old rival, the Christian People's Party with Lourdes Flores as his first running mate. The election's first round polls gave García 5.83% of the popular vote, preventing him from participating in the runoff election. Pedro Pablo Kuczynski was ultimately elected.

=== Mega-commission ===
In 2013, a mega-commission was formed which lasted five years to investigate the alleged irregularities of the second government of Alan García, with the nationalist Sergio Tejada as head. Of the eight cases that the mega-commission analyzed, in none of them was the commission able to continue the investigations against the former president because he presented an amparo action against the commission, alleging the violation of due process. Consequently, the judiciary annulled everything that had been done with regard to García, thus preventing the investigation from continuing.

=== Odebrecht scandal ===
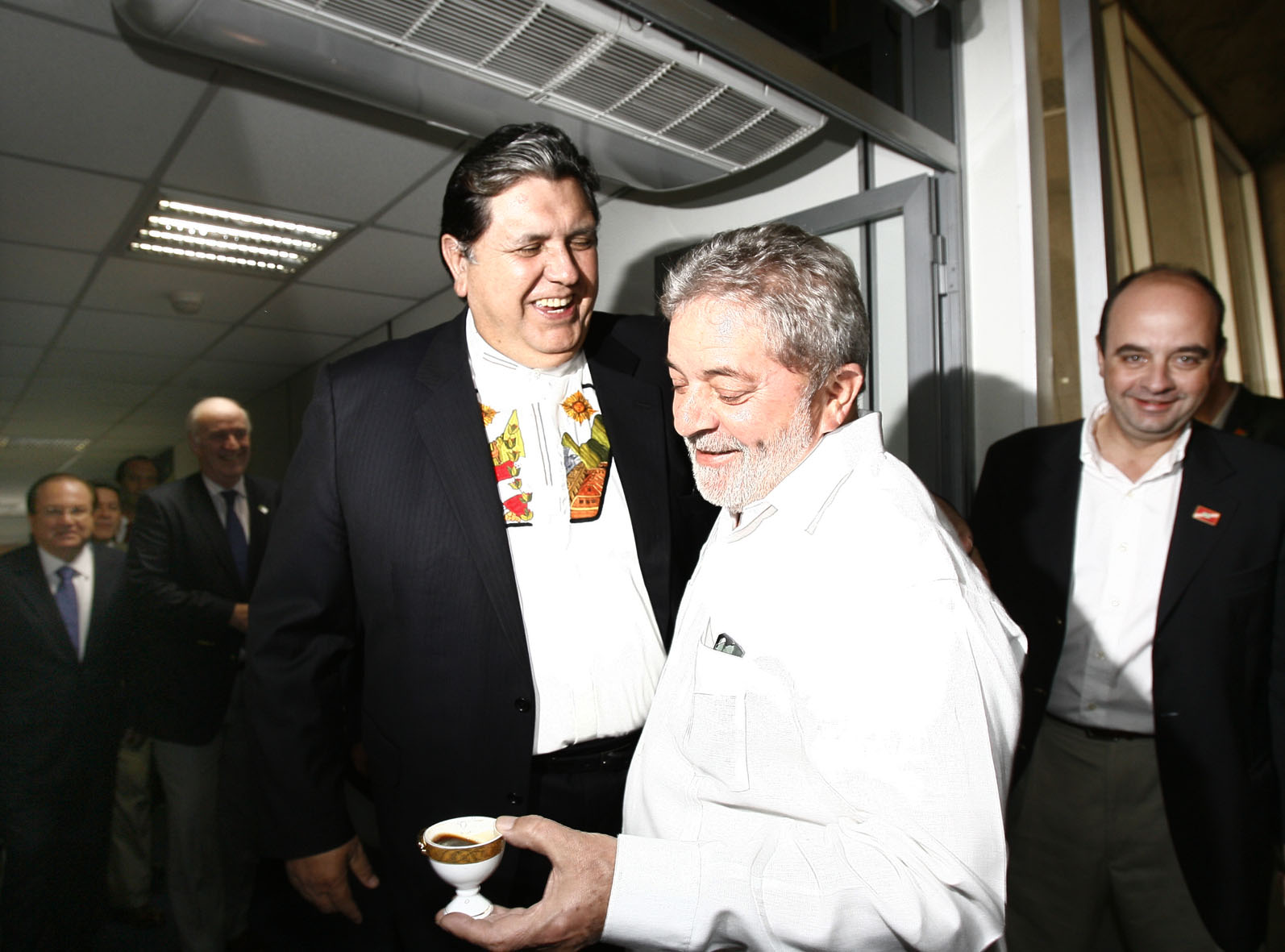
García in 2010 with Brazilian president Luiz Inácio Lula da Silva

The Peruvian press reported that in May 2012, after leaving office, García was paid US$100,000 to give a speech to Brazilian business leaders in São Paulo, money which was later characterized in the media as, and suspected by Peruvian prosecutors to be, a kickback from the Brazilian construction company Odebrecht. Because García reported and paid taxes on each payment he received, and multiple organizations were willing to pay him to have him as speaker, his defense and lawyers were optimistic that they could show that the payments did not constitute bribery.

In 2016 and 2017, five of García's former ministers were accused of corruption by the Peruvian justice system: Yehude Simon (Prime Minister), Rosario Fernández (Minister of Justice), Mercedes Cabanillas (Minister of the Interior), Ántero Flores Aráoz (Minister of Defence), and Luis Nava Guibert (Minister of Production).

In November 2018, García was banned from leaving Peru by the courts due to the Odebrecht scandal investigation. He entered the residence of the Uruguayan ambassador on 17 November, requesting asylum. Thus, on 18 November, the Ministry of Foreign Affairs of Peru reported that the ambassador of the Eastern Republic of Uruguay had communicated the entry of the former president to his residence and the request for diplomatic asylum. The Minister of Relations Uruguayan Foreign Ministry, Rodolfo Nin Novoa, reported that Uruguay had decided to process the asylum application. On 20 November, the Peruvian Foreign Ministry delivered a diplomatic note to the Uruguayan ambassador, Carlos Barros, on the request for diplomatic asylum presented by Alan García, expressing the position of the Peruvian government and denying the existence of political persecution. However, on 3 December his request was denied, and he subsequently left the ambassador's residence. On 4 January 2019, García appeared before the prosecutor's office as a witness to testify in the investigation carried out against Miguel Atala (former vice president of PetroPerú), for having received a bribe from the Odebrecht company.

The scandal also led to arrests, where possible, of all of the other living former presidents of Peru who had served since 2000: Pedro Pablo Kuczynski, Ollanta Humala, and Alejandro Toledo.

== Suicide ==
On 17 April 2019, García shot himself in the head while hiding in his bedroom as he was being presented with a ten-day preliminary arrest warrant related to investigations for corruption and bribes his presidential secretary allegedly received from Odebrecht. Initial reports stated that officers had violated protocol, allowing García to be alone with the excuse that he was going to talk with his lawyer. He was taken to the Casimiro Ulloa hospital and underwent an emergency surgical procedure, during which he experienced three cardiac arrests. After four hours, his death was announced by the heads of the American Popular Revolutionary Alliance (APRA) political party and Nidia Vílchez, with the cause being a "massive" cerebral hemorrhage and cardiorespiratory arrest. According to police sources, García had shot himself with his Colt Anaconda revolver, which had been given to him as a gift by the Peruvian Navy during his second term, and was among nine other firearms that the former president was licensed to own.

A few hours after his death was announced, García's body was taken in a wooden casket to the APRA headquarters in Lima, where a memorial service was held on the same day. President Martín Vizcarra declared a three-day mourning period.

Various Peruvian and foreign authorities and personalities expressed their condolences to the family for the death of the former president. On social media and on the Peruvian diaspora, public opinion was more polarized.

== Public image ==
García was 2008 Latin Business Chronicle's "leader of the year" at a time when Peru was ranked as Latin America's third-best country for business.

However, corruption scandals during his second presidency have led 35% of Peruvians to consider Garcia's administration the most corrupt in the country's history. This is according to a 2017 survey by Ipsos of 1314 people, commissioned by Proética, the Peruvian chapter of Transparency International. The survey found that, in terms of levels of corruption, Garcia's administration is followed by that of his first successor, Fujimori (23%), and that of his second successor, Humala, in third place (22%). Garcia himself has been rated as one of the most corrupt Peruvian politicians, when not the most, in surveys done after his second term ended, in the mid-to-late 2010s, by Proética, Datum, Perú 21 and Gestión magazine.

== Awards and recognitions ==
- Bolivia:
  - Grand Collar of the Order of the Condor of the Andes - 2010
- Chile:
  - Grand Cross of the Order of Bernardo O'Higgins - 2011
- Ecuador:
  - Grand Collar of the National Order of Merit - 2011
- Paraguay:
  - Grand Collar of the National Order of Merit - 2010
- Spain:
  - Collar of the Order of Isabella the Catholic - 2008
- South Korea:
  - Recipient of the Grand Order of Mugunghwa - 2009

=== Honorary doctorate ===
- Doctor Honoris Causa - University of Delhi (1987)

== Published works ==
García was the author of several books on Peruvian and Latin American affairs. Most of them may be found in the National Library of Peru. His published works include the following:

- 1981 A la Inmensa Mayoría: Discursos
- 1982 El Futuro Diferente
- 1987 El Desarme Financiero: Pueblo y Deuda en América Latina
- 1990 La Revolución Regional
- 1991 La Defensa de Alan García
- 1992 El Nuevo Totalitarismo
- 1994 El Mundo de Maquiavelo
- 1997 La Falsa Modernidad
- 1997 Siete Tesis Erróneas del Neoliberalismo en América Latina
- 1999 Mi Gobierno Hizo la Regionalización
- 2000 La Década Infame: Deuda Externa 1990–1999
- 2003 Modernidad y Política en el Siglo XXI: Globalización con Justicia Social
- 2005 Sierra Exportadora: Empleo, Modernidad y Justicia en Los Andes
- 2011 Contra el Temor Económico: Creer en el Perú
- 2012 Pida la Palabra: Por la Libertad, la Plenitud y el Exito
- 2012 Pizarro, el Rey de la Baraja: Política, confusión y dolor en la Conquista
- 2013 Noventa años de aprismo: Hay, hermanos, muchísimo que hacer
- 2013 Confucio y la globalización: Comprender China y crecer con ella
- 2014 Sierra Exportadora: La creación de la Alianza del Pacífico
- 2015 Obras completas IX volúmenes
- 2019 Metamemorias

== Electoral history ==
Year	Office	Type	Party	Main opponent	Party	Votes for García				Result	Swing
Year	Office	Type	Party	Main opponent	Party	Total	%	P.	±%	Result	Swing
1978	Constituent Deputy	Parliamentary	Peruvian Aprista Party	Santiago Castellano Bedoya	Christian People's Party	958	35.34%	1st	N/A	Won	Gain
1980	National Deputy from Lima	General	Peruvian Aprista Party	Francisco Belaúnde Terry	Popular Action	333,901 (List)	22.57%	2nd	−4.59%	Won	Gain
1985	President of Peru	General	Peruvian Aprista Party	Alfonso Barrantes	United Left	3,457,030	53.11%	1st	+25.71%	Won	Gain
2001	President of Peru	General	Peruvian Aprista Party	Alejandro Toledo	Possible Peru	2,732,857	25.77%	N/A	+24.40%	N/A	N/A
2001	President of Peru	General (second round)	Peruvian Aprista Party	Alejandro Toledo	Possible Peru	4,904,929	47.37%	2nd	+21.60%	Lost	N/A
2006	President of Peru	General	Peruvian Aprista Party	Ollanta Humala	Union for Peru	2,985,858	24.32%	2nd	−23.05%	N/A	N/A
2006	President of Peru	General (second round)	Peruvian Aprista Party	Ollanta Humala	Union for Peru	6,965,017	52.62%	1st	+28.30%	Won	Gain
2016	President of Peru	General	Popular Alliance	Keiko Fujimori	Popular Force	894,278	5.83%	5th	N/A	Lost	N/A

== See also ==
- List of heads of state and government who committed suicide
- First presidency of Alan García
- Second presidency of Alan García

== Notes ==
Party political offices
Preceded by Fernando León de Vivero	General Secretary of the Peruvian Aprista Party; 1982–1985	Succeeded by Armando Villanueva; Luis Negreiros
Preceded by Armando Villanueva	APRA nominee for President of Peru; 1985	Succeeded by Luis Alva Castro
Preceded by Armando Villanueva	President of the Peruvian Aprista Party; 1985–2019	Succeeded by César Trelles
Preceded by Abel Salinas	APRA nominee for President of Peru; 2001, 2006	Succeeded by Mercedes Aráoz
Preceded by Mercedes Aráoz	APRA nominee for President of Peru; 2016	Succeeded by Nidia Vílchez
Political offices
Preceded by Fernando Belaúnde Terry	President of Peru; 1985–1990	Succeeded by Alberto Fujimori
Preceded by Alejandro Toledo	President of Peru; 2006–2011	Succeeded by Ollanta Humala
Diplomatic posts
Preceded by John Howard	Chairperson of APEC; 2008	Succeeded by Lee Hsien Loong
