= Antonieta Zevallos de Prialé =

Peruvian politician (1918/1919–2006)

Antonieta Zevallos Núñez de Prialé

Member of the Chamber of Deputies
- In office 26 July 1980 – 26 July 1985
- Constituency: Lima Metropolitan Area

Member of the Jesús María District Council
- In office 1 January 1967 – 31 December 1969

Personal details
- Born: 1918 or 1919
- Died: 8 August 2006 (aged 87)
- Resting place: Cementerio El Ángel, Lima
- Party: Peruvian Aprista Party
- Spouse: Ramiro Prialé (m. 1945; died 1988)

Antonieta Zevallos Núñez de Prialé (1918/1919 – 8 August 2006) was a Peruvian politician who served in the Chamber of Deputies from 1980 until 1985, representing Lima as a member of the Peruvian Aprista Party. Her husband Ramiro Prialé was one of the founders and most prominent figures of the party.

== Biography ==
Antonieta Zevallos de Prialé was born in 1918 or 1919. In 1945, she met Ramiro Prialé, the leader of the Peruvian Aprista Party, and the couple married later that year. Zevallos served as a key advisor to her husband, and founded the women's wing of the party. In the 1980 Peruvian general election, Zevallos was elected to the Chamber of Deputies, representing Lima as a member of the Peruvian Aprista Party. She left office at the end of her term in 1985. During her life, Zevallos also led several social organizations, including the Foundation of the Children of the Town and the National Comprehensive Program for Family Well-being (INABIF).

Zevallos died on 8 August 2006 at the age of 87. Her coffin was taken to the Legislative Palace, where Peruvian Aprista Party congressmembers Mauricio Mulder and Mercedes Cabanillas paid tribute to her. She was later buried at the Cementerio El Ángel in Lima.
