= Peruvian Communist Party (Marxist–Leninist) =

Political party in Peru

Peruvian Communist Party (Marxist–Leninist) Partido Comunista Peruano (Marxista–Leninista)
- Abbreviation: PCPML
- Founded: January 1964
- Split from: Peruvian Communist Party
- Newspaper: Bandera Roja
- Ideology: Communism; Marxism–Leninism; Stalinism; Hoxhaism; Anti-revisionism; Formerly: Maoism
- Political position: Far-left
- National affiliation: FEDEP (since 1978); Peru Wins (2011–2012)
- International affiliation: ICMLPO

Website
- pcpml.net

The Peruvian Communist Party (Marxist–Leninist) (Spanish: Partido Comunista Peruano (Marxista–Leninista)) is an anti-revisionist Marxist–Leninist communist party in Peru. It was founded in January 1964 following a split in the Peruvian Communist Party, and was originally known as the Peruvian Communist Party – Red Flag (Partido Comunista Peruano – Bandera Roja).

== History ==
The Sino-Soviet split separated the Peruvian Communist Party into two rival factions, one pro-Soviet and the other pro-Chinese. The latter subsequently split from the Peruvian Communist Party in January 1964 and adopted the name "Peruvian Communist Party – Red Flag". The party was originally led by Saturnino Paredes, José Sotomayor, and Abimael Guzmán. Due to internal disagreements among the party's three leaders, the party expelled several of its members in its early history. Two parties subsequently emerged from a 1969 split in the party: the Communist Party of Peru – Red Fatherland and the Communist Party of Peru – Shining Path led by Guzmán. Afterwards, Paredes became the party's sole leader and renamed the party "Peruvian Communist Party (Marxist–Leninist)". In response to the Sino-Albanian split, the party dropped its commitment to Maoism and aligned itself with the Party of Labour of Albania and Hoxhaism.

The party participated in the 1978 Constituent Assembly election on the list of FOCEP. FOCEP won 12 of the 100 seats.

In July 2019, the Communist Party of Peru (Marxist–Leninist) participated in the Meeting of Marxist–Leninist Parties and Organizations of Latin America and the Caribbean, hosted by the International Conference of Marxist–Leninist Parties and Organizations (ICMLPO). The party signed the subsequent political declaration made by the participating organizations.

== See also ==
- Communism in Peru
- List of anti-revisionist groups
