= Peruvian Communist Party =

Communist party in Peru founded in 1928

Peruvian Communist Party Partido Comunista Peruano (Note: From 1928 to 1930: Partido Socialista Peruano)
- Abbreviation: PCP (Note: From 1928 to 1930: PSP)
- Secretary-General: Domingo Cabrera Toro
- Founder: José Carlos Mariátegui
- Founded: 9 April 1928
- Headquarters: Ramón Castilla Square, Lima, Peru
- Youth wing: JCP (Note: Peruvian Communist Youth (Spanish: Juventud Comunista Peruana))
- Ideology: Communism; Marxism–Leninism; Mariáteguism
- Political position: Far-left
- National affiliation: JP (2017–present)
- Regional affiliation: São Paulo Forum
- International affiliation: IMCWP; WAP

Website
- pcp.pe

The Peruvian Communist Party (Spanish: Partido Comunista Peruano; PCP) is a Marxist-Leninist party in Peru that was founded as the Peruvian Socialist Party (Partido Socialista Peruano, PSP) in 1928 by a group led by José Carlos Mariátegui until its name change in 1930. In contemporary Peruvian politics, it is often referred to as the Peruvian Communist Party – Unity (Spanish: Partido Comunista Peruano – Unidad; PCP (Unidad)) to distinguish it from similarly named communist parties.

The PCP is headquartered at Ramón Castilla Square in Lima, and publishes Unidad ("Unity") and Nuestra Bandera ("Our Flag"). The party participates in the annual International Meeting of Communist and Workers Parties (IMCWP).

== History ==
The group was originally founded as the Peruvian Socialist Party (PSP) in 1928 by a group of nine socialist sympathisers (known as the "Group of Lima"), which included Marxist philosopher and journalist José Carlos Mariátegui, and formally changed its name in 1930, following Mariátegui's death and his succession by Eudocio Ravines as party leader.

Following a period of outright illegality, the group gradually incorporated itself into the legal political scene during the 1960s, which led to the disappointment with its so-called bureaucratic and collaborationist character, believing that guerrilla warfare was the only path to the establishment of a socialist state. In 1962, a faction split and formed the National Liberation Army (ELN) a year later, which led such a military campaign until its defeat by 1965.

In 1963, the ongoing Sino-Soviet split separated the PCP into two rival factions, one pro-Soviet and the other pro-Chinese. The latter subsequently split from the Peruvian Communist Party in January 1964 and adopted the name "Peruvian Communist Party – Red Flag" (PCP-BR). The party was originally led by Saturnino Paredes, José Sotomayor, and Abimael Guzmán. Due to internal disagreements among the party's three leaders, the party expelled several of its members in its early history. Two parties subsequently emerged from a 1969 split in the party: the Communist Party of Peru – Red Fatherland (PCP-PR) and the Communist Party of Peru – Shining Path (PCP-SL) (Note: Self-proclaimed as the "Communist Party of Peru" (PCP), but otherwise known as the "Shining Path" (SL).) led by Guzmán. Afterwards, Paredes became the party's sole leader and renamed the party "Peruvian Communist Party (Marxist–Leninist)". In response to the Sino-Albanian split, the party dropped its commitment to Maoism and aligned itself with the Party of Labour of Albania and Hoxhaism. In 1978, the "PCP-Mayoría" faction split from the PCP to form a more pro-Soviet branch, as it considered that the PCP had adopted Eurocommunism instead, operating until the 1980s.

Following the dissolution of the Soviet Union in 1991, the PCP and other communist parties in Peru have since participated at a much smaller level in the country's politics, mainly through broad left-wing political alliances. In the 2011 general election, the party took part in the successful Peru Wins alliance of Ollanta Humala.

== Leadership ==
Jorge del Prado was the party's general secretary from 1966 to 1991.

№	Secretary	Mandate	
№	Secretary	Start	End
1	José Carlos Mariátegui	1930	1930
2	Eudocio Ravines	1930	1937
3	Julio Portocarrero	1937	1940
4	Hugo Pesce	1940	1946
5	Jorge del Prado Chávez	1946	1948
6	Jorge Acosta Salas	1948	1962
7	Raúl Acosta Salas	1962	1963
8	Jorge del Prado Chávez	1963	1991
9	Renan Raffo Muñoz	1991	2008
10	Roberto de la Cruz Huamán	2008	2017
11	Flor de María Gonzales Uriola	2017	2018
12	Luis Villanueva Carbajal	2018	2024
13	Domingo Cabrera Toro	2024	Incumbent

== See also ==
- Communism in Peru
