= Carolina Lizárraga =

Peruvian lawyer, jurist, and politician

Member of Congress
- In office 16 March 2020 – 26 July 2021
- Constituency: Lima

Judge of the Superior Court of Justice of Lima
- In office 13 September 2010 – 31 December 2014
- Appointed by: National Council of the Magistrature
- In office 25 May 2002 – 23 October 2007
- Appointed by: National Council of the Magistrature

Head of the National Anticorruption Office
- In office 23 October 2007 – 8 July 2008
- Appointed by: Alan García
- Preceded by: Office established
- Succeeded by: Office deactivated (functions merged with the Office of the Comptroller General)

Personal details
- Born: March 25, 1970 (age 55) Lima, Peru
- Political party: Purple Party (2016-2021); Independent (2021-present)
- Spouse: José Ramírez-Gastón Roe (m. 2007)
- Education: Pontifical Catholic University of Peru (LL.B.) (B.A.); Yale University (LL.M.); University of Alicante (LL.M.); University of Salamanca

Carolina Lizárraga Houghton (born 25 March 1970) is a Peruvian lawyer, jurist, and politician who serves as a member of the Congress of the Republic of Peru (PM), representing the Lima constituency.

A graduate of the Pontifical Catholic University of Peru and Yale Law School, Lizárraga pursued a career in the Peruvian Judiciary. From 2002 to 2007, she served as judge of the Superior Court of Justice of Lima, and was appointed by President Alan García to the National Anticorruption Office. Dubbed as the "anticorruption tsarina" by the media, she resigned in July 2008, in the midst of criticisms of the agency's creation. She was reappointed as judge to the Lima Superior Court in September 2010, serving until her resignation in December 2014.

Entering politics for the 2016 general election, Lizárraga was selected to run for the second vice presidency, as part of the All for Peru ticket led by Julio Guzmán as the presidential nominee. The ticket was eventually disqualified by the National Elections Jury, amid party irregularities in the nominating process. In the aftermath of the election, she founded the Purple Party, alongside Julio Guzmán and Francisco Sagasti. Elected to the Peruvian Congress at the 2020 parliamentary election, she ran against Guzmán for the party's presidential nomination for the 2021 general election. She ultimately placed second in the primary election, as Guzmán won the nomination.

== Early life and education ==
Lizárraga was born in Lima on 25 March 1970. She started her elementary education at Santa María School of Piura, and finished her high school education at the Colegio Sagrados Corazones Belén, in the city of Lima.

Upon graduating from high school, Lizárraga was admitted to the Pontifical Catholic University of Peru, where she attained a law degree. She completed a Master of Laws (LL.M.) at Yale Law School, as well as a master's degree in Legal Argumentation at the University of Alicante, and doctoral studies in Criminal Law at the University of Salamanca.

In 2015, she returned to the Pontifical Catholic University of Peru to study psychology, graduating in 2020 with a bachelor's degree.

== Judicial career ==
From 2002 to 2007, Lizárraga served as Criminal Judge of the Superior Court of Justice of Lima, and of the VI Anticorruption Court. Subsequently, she was appointed by the Alan García administration as Head of the newly created National Anticorruption Office, serving in the position until her resignation in July 2008.

In September 2010, Lizárraga returned Superior Court of Justice of Lima, in the position of Superior Anticorruption Judge. She served the court until her resignation in December 2014.

== Political career ==
=== 2016 presidential election ===
In the months leading to the 2016 general election, the All for Peru presidential nominee, Julio Guzmán, announced Juana Umasi and Lizárraga as his first and second running mates, respectively. The ticket was registered in January 2016, but controversy arose on the party's nominating procedure. The National Elections Jury took over the case, and eventually disqualified the ticket on 10 March 2016, less than four weeks to the election.

Alongside Julio Guzmán, Francisco Sagasti, and other members of the initial team, Lizárraga left All for Peru in order found the Purple Party on 18 November 2017. As a founding member, she was appointed to the National Executive Committee, and the Political Committee, where she served until her resignation in September 2020.

=== Congress (2020-present) ===
In the aftermath of the 2019 Peruvian constitutional crisis, the Purple Party was fully registered to participate in the 2020 parliamentary election, held on 26 January 2020. Lizárraga was subsequently elected to the Peruvian Congress, attaining 49,131 votes from the Lima constituency.

Upon taking office on 16 March 2020, Lizárraga was selected as Chair of the Committee on Women and Family.

Following the removal of Martín Vizcarra, the Purple Party remained in staunch disapproval of Manuel Merino's ascension to the presidency. Amid the 2020 Peruvian protests, Merino resigned and Congress was to elect his successor. Lizárraga was proposed by multiple caucuses as a contender to fulfill the remainder of the 2016–2021 term, although she dismissed the claim. After extensive negotiations between members of congress, Francisco Sagasti was ultimately elected President of Congress, and thus President of Peru.

=== 2021 presidential election ===
For the 2021 general election, Lizárraga ran for the Purple Party's presidential nomination. Running against Julio Guzmán, Lizárraga cited unfairness and bias in favor of Guzmán's candidacy from the party leadership. On the primary election held on 29 November 2020, her candidacy attained 753 votes (19.1%), while Guzmán was selected with 3,002 votes (77%), securing the presidential nomination.
