= 2020 Peruvian protests =

Demonstrations against the removal of President Vizcarra

- Part of 2017–present Peruvian political crisis
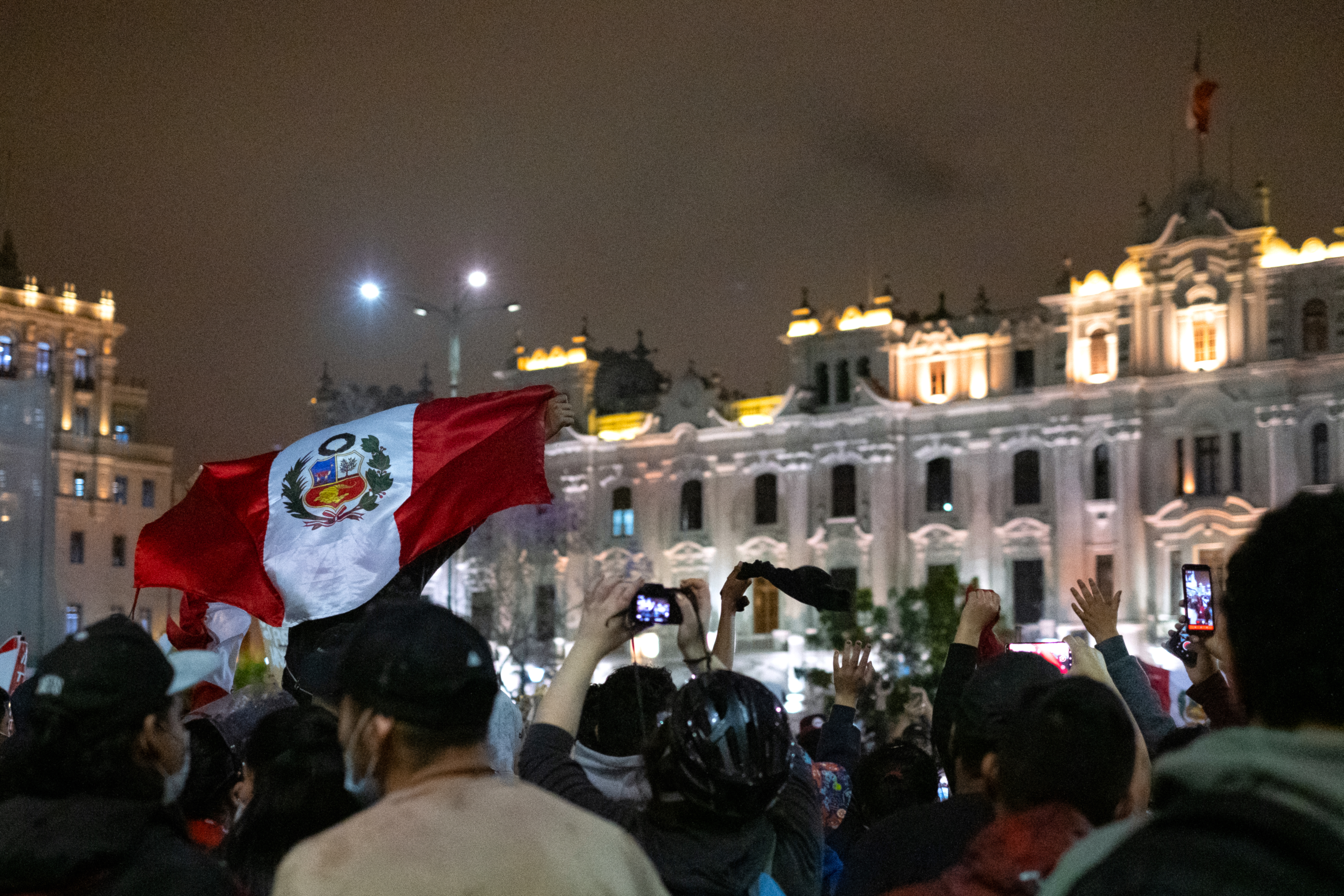
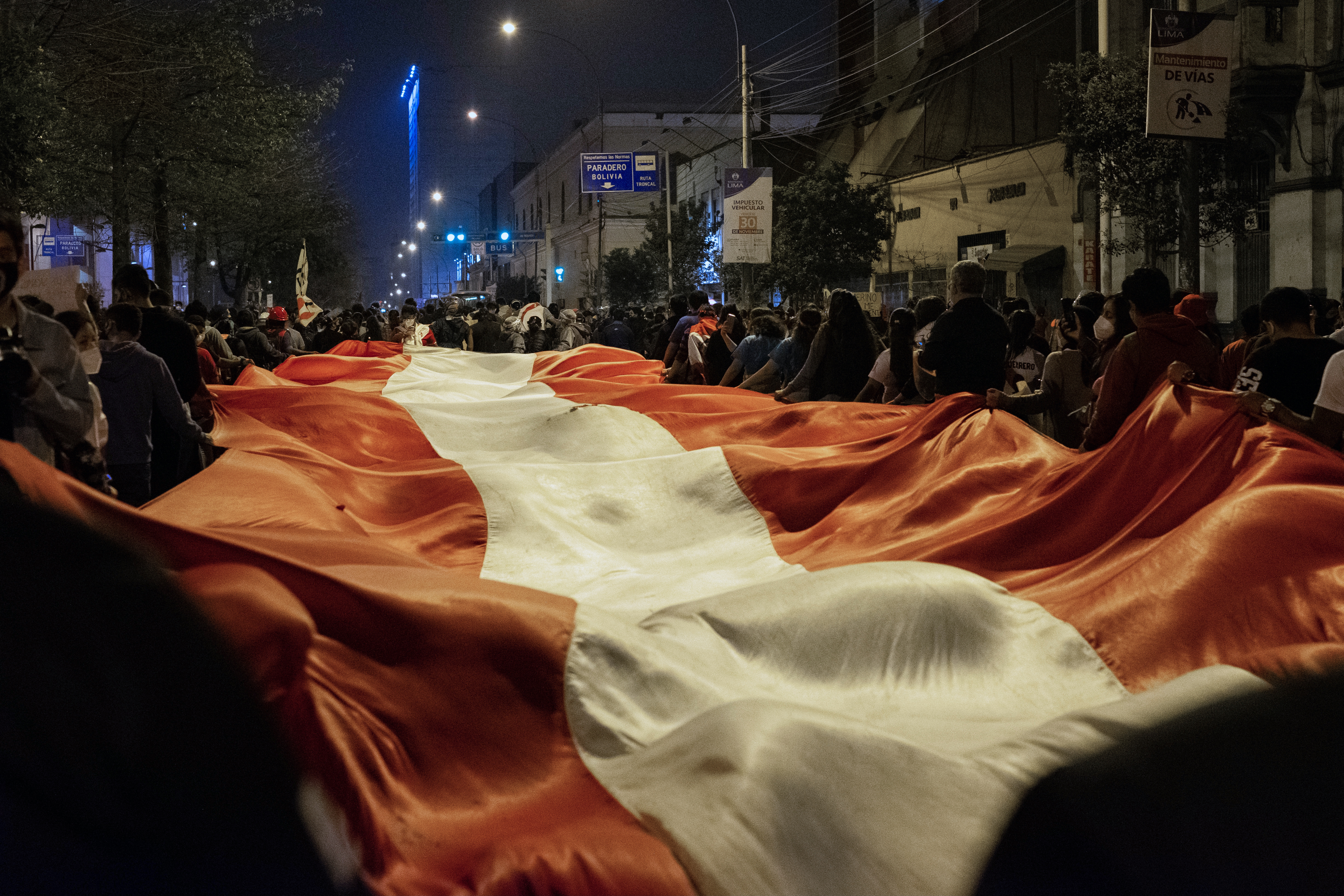
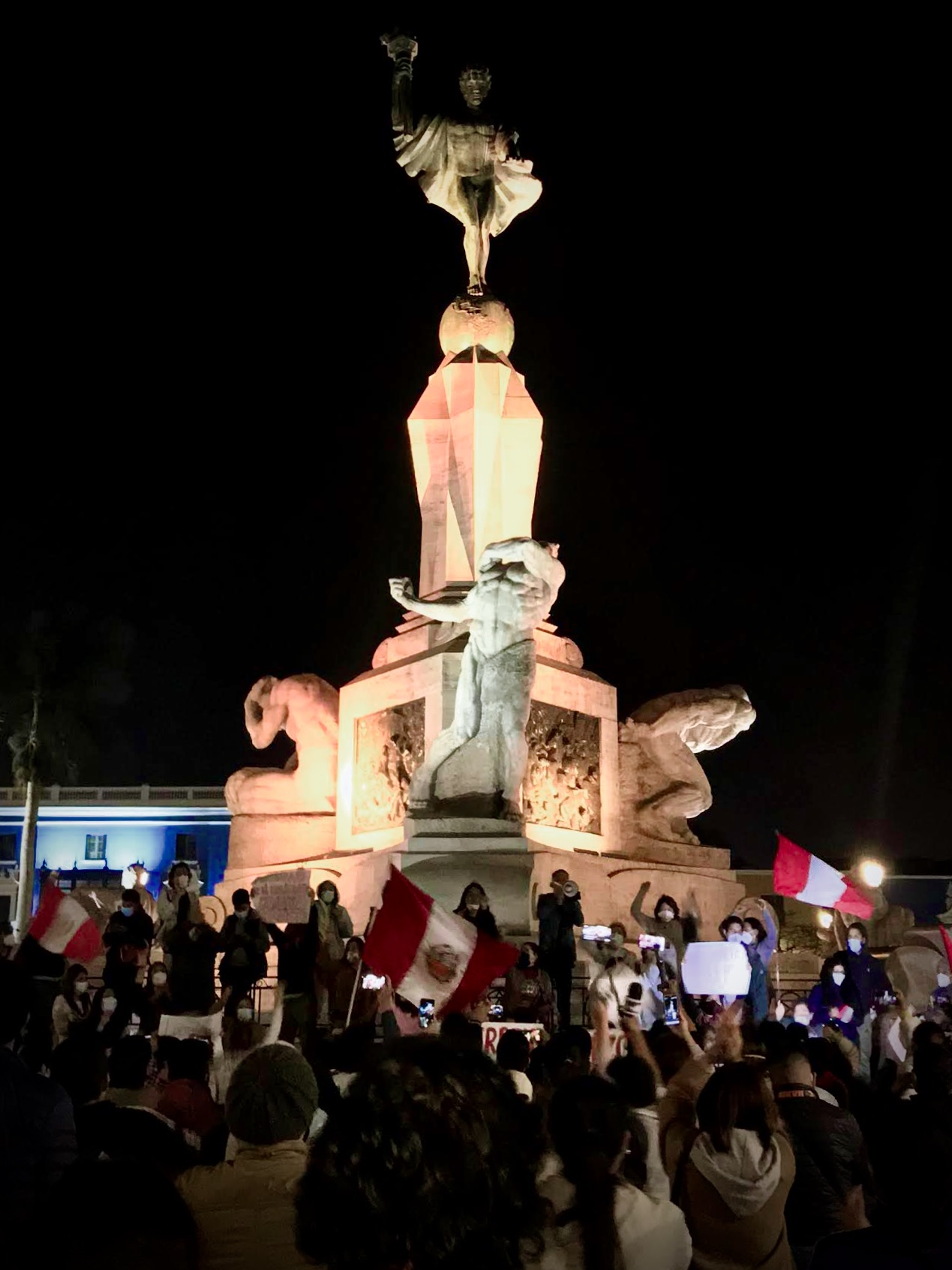
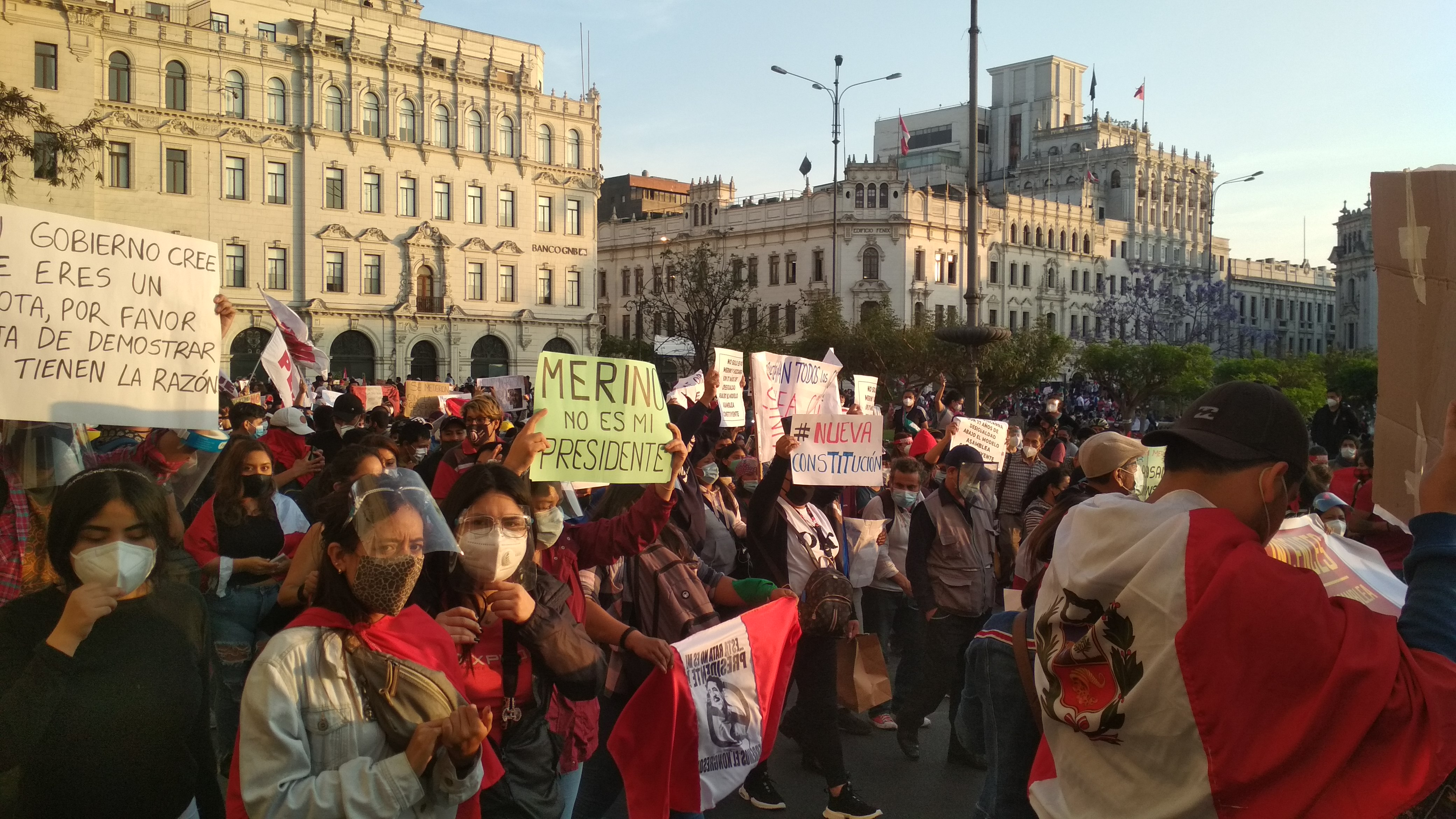
- Top to bottom, left to right: Demonstrations on 17 November at Plaza San Martín, protesters carrying a large Peruvian flag during the first National March on 12 November, demonstration in Plaza de Armas of Trujillo on 9 November and protesters gathered during the first National March in Lima.
- Date: 9 – 17 November 2020 (9 days)
- Location: Peru
- Caused by: Removal of Martín Vizcarra; Inauguration of Manuel Merino; Government mishandling of the COVID-19 pandemic in Peru
- Goals: Removal of Manuel Merino; A new government until elections; Removal of parliamentary immunity; Creation of constituent assembly; Enhanced labor rights
- Methods: Demonstrations; Occupations; National strikes
- Result: Manuel Merino resigns from presidency; Francisco Sagasti is designated president until general elections

Parties
Government of Peru; Armed Forces of Peru; National Police of Peru; Terna Group; Supporting parties: Popular Action; Union for Peru; Podemos Perú; Popular Force; Alliance for Progress; Broad Front (removal of Martín Vizcarra)	Protesters: Pro-Vizcarra protesters; National Coordinator for Human Rights; CGTP; Opposition parties: Nuevo Peru; Purple Party; Together for Peru; Broad Front (removal of Manuel Merino); Human rights groups: National Human Rights Coordinator

Lead figures
Manuel Merino; Ántero Flores Aráoz Popular Force: Keiko Fujimori; Kenji Fujimori Union for Peru: Antauro Humala; Édgar Alarcón	Julio Guzmán; Verónika Mendoza; Daniel Olivares; Carolina Lizárraga; Alberto de Belaúnde; Gino Costa; Mesías Guevara

Number
	Tens of thousands

Casualties and losses
Injuries 11 police (12 Nov)	Deaths: 2 (14 Nov); 1 (3 Dec); Injuries: 16 (12 Nov); 94 (14 Nov)

Casualties
- Detained: Dozens

The 2020 Peruvian protests were a series of demonstrations sparked after the removal of President Martín Vizcarra that took place from 9 November to 17 November 2020.

The controversial removal of Vizcarra was recognized as a coup d'état by many Peruvians, political analysts and media outlets in the country. Protests were registered in several cities of the country, to show their outrage at the president's vacancy and reject the inauguration of the president of Congress, Manuel Merino. Upon taking office, Merino formed a far-right government.

The protests have been described as the largest demonstrations in Peru in the past two decades and are organized by grassroots groups of young Peruvians on social media. The disproportional response by authorities has been condemned by various human rights organizations, including the United Nations, the Inter-American Commission on Human Rights (IACHR) and Amnesty International.

After reports that two protesters were killed by authorities on 14 November, the majority of ministers from Merino's government resigned from office while Merino resigned the following day; he was president for five days. Along with the aftermath of two dead, hundreds were left injured and over 40 citizens were reported as missing and authorities have refused to investigate further. On 16 November, the Congress of Peru elected Francisco Sagasti as the president of the legislature, automatically elevating him to the Peruvian presidency under the constitution.

== Background ==
Martín Vizcarra was elected as First Vice President of Peru in a 2016 general election, running with Pedro Pablo Kuczynski of the Peruanos Por el Kambio party. On 23 March 2018, Vizcarra was sworn into office as president of Peru following the resignation of President Kuczynski. Upon being sworn into office, Vizcarra stated "we've had enough", vowing to combat corruption as president.

=== Opposition from congress ===
Throughout Vizcarra's tenure, he faced opposition from the Congress of Peru. He initially faced opposition from the Fujimorist congress when pushing for the constitutional referendum in 2018, an election that resulted in laws prohibiting the private funding of political campaigns and a ban on reelecting lawmakers. Into 2019, the Fujimorist congress continued to delay Vizcarra's reforms, with Vizcarra later dissolving the congress after instituting a motion of no confidence, saying it was "clear the democracy of our nation is at risk".

A legislative election was held later on 26 January 2020 which replaced the dissolved congress, with centrist parties replacing the Fujimorist majority in congress. Analysts Diego Pereira and Lucila Barbeito of JPMorgan Chase & Co described the new congress as being "even more antagonistic to the [Vizcarra] government than the previous one" while Americas Quarterly wrote that the four main right-wing parties of congress – Alliance for Progress, Podemos Perú, Popular Action and Union for Peru – feared Vizcarra's anti-corruption measures on campaign financing, political transparency and the participation of convicted persons in government.

As Peru's economy declined due to the COVID-19 pandemic in Peru, Vizcarra faced increased political pressure from the newly inaugurated congress presided by Manuel Merino, with the majority of the legislative body being controlled by those opposing Vizcarra. Finally on 5 July 2020, Vizcarra proposed a referendum to be held during the 2021 Peruvian general election to remove parliamentary immunity, though congress quickly responded by assembling that same night to pass their own immunity bill that contained proposals to remove immunity from the president, constitutional court and the human rights ombudsman while also strengthening some instances of parliamentary immunity.

=== Impeachment and removal of Vizcarra ===
==== First attempt at removal ====
In early 2020, investigations began surrounding a contract for a little-known singer by the name of Richard Cisneros to perform speeches for the Ministry of Culture. The first impeachment process was led by the imprisoned Antauro Humala and his Union for Peru (UPP) party, according to reports in Peru. Humala was sentenced to 19 years in prison following his Andahuaylazo uprising against President Alejandro Toledo that resulted in the deaths of police. From his cell, Humala reportedly orchestrated the impeachment process with members of congress and his UPP supporters. Edgar Alarcón, a UPP congressman and a close supporter of Humala, took charge of the impeachment process against Vizcarra. Alarcón himself, according to Vice News, was protected from criminal charges of embezzlement and illicit monetary gains due to parliamentary immunity, charges that could have resulted with seventeen years in prison.

It was alleged that an inexperienced Cisneros was able to receive payments totaling US$50,000 due to contacts in the Government Palace. Investigators searched offices in the Government Palace on 1 June 2020 regarding the alleged irregularities. Vizcarra responded to the release of the recordings stating "I am not going to resign. I am not running away" and that the "audios have been edited and maliciously manipulated; as you can see, they purposely seek to turn a job-related claim into a criminal or political act, wanting to take words out of context and intend to accuse me of non-existent situations. Nothing is further from reality".

Peru's democracy is, unfortunately, sinking further and further into crisis, ... The removal of the president is a really big deal, and it requires serious deliberation, public debate and investigation. There has been none.

— Steve Levitsky

President of Congress Manuel Merino was criticized by critics regarding how he hastily pushed for impeachment proceedings against Vizcarra. If Vizcarra were to be removed from office, Merino would assume the presidential office given his position in congress and due to the absence of vice presidents for Vizcarra. (Note: Peru has two Vice Presidents, a First and Second Vice President. The most recent holders of the office of First and Second Vice President were Vizcarra and Mercedes Aráoz, respectively, who were elected in the 2016 election. Vizcarra left the office of First Vice President vacant after he succeeded Kuzcynski as President, leaving Aráoz as the sole Vice President, while Aráoz resigned as Second Vice President on 1 October 2019 after the Congress of Peru named Aráoz acting President the day before after having declared Vizacarra temporarily unfit for office, despite Congress having itself been dissolved earlier that day by President Vizcarra, resulting in a constitutional crisis. However, her resignation was not official until it was accepted on 7 May 2020 by the new Congress of Peru sworn on 16 March 2020, since in Peru the resignation of the vice president has to be accepted by Congress and that institution was not celebrating meetings given its dissolution.) On 12 September 2020, renowned reporter Gustavo Gorriti wrote that Merino had contacted the Commanding General of the Peruvian Navy, Fernando Cerdán, notifying him that he was going to attempt to impeach Vizcarra and was hoping to assume the presidency. Minister of Defense Jorge Chávez confirmed that Merino had tried to establish support with the Peruvian military. A second report was later released that Merino had contacted officials throughout Peru's government while preparing to create a transitional cabinet. Following the release of these reports, support for impeaching Vizcarra decreased among members of congress, with congress voting not to remove Vizcarra from the presidency.

==== Removal of Vizcarra ====
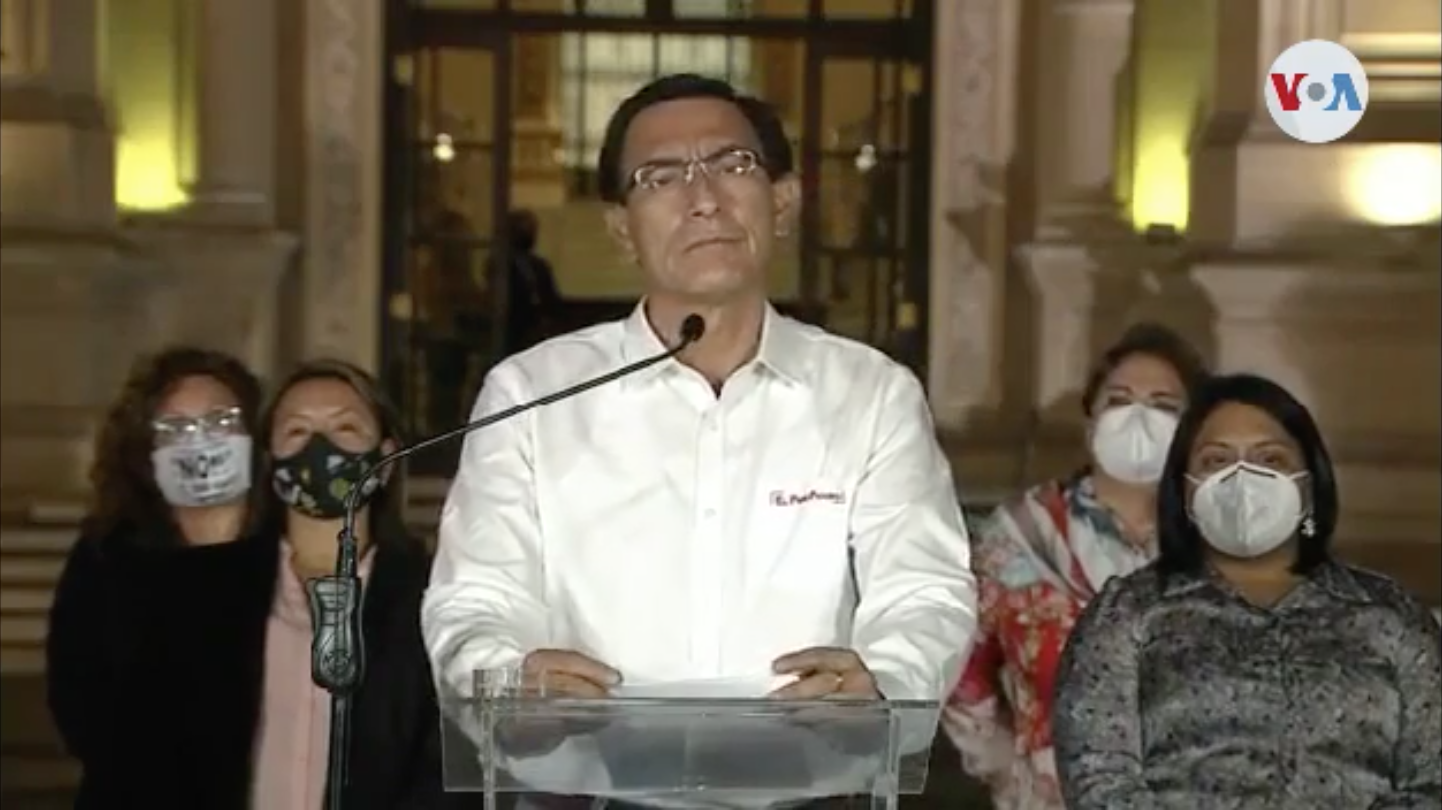
Martín Vizcarra, flanked by his ministers, announcing his return home on 9 November following the vacancy vote

After the first attempt failed, the Union for Peru bench raised a new vacancy request in October 2020, based on the alleged acts of corruption committed by Vizcarra when he was regional Governor of Moquegua, which includes the testimony of an applicant to an effective collaborator in the "Construction Club Case" who stated that the Obrainsa company paid him 1 million soles and three other aspiring effective collaborators also point out that he received 1.3 million soles from the Ingenieros Civiles y Contractors Generales SA consortium (ICCGSA), and Incot for the tender of the project for the construction of the Regional Hospital of Moquegua in 2013. On 2 November, impeachment was initiated by the Congress of Peru with 60 votes in favor, 40 against and 18 abstentions. Vizcarra attended the plenary session in Congress on 9 November to defend himself against the accusations.

On 9 November 2020, a total of 105 members of Congress voted to remove Vizcarra from office, exceeding the 87 votes (out of 130) that were still needed to impeach him. Merino, who succeeded him as president the following day, with a mandate to serve as president until July 2021. Vizcarra called the accusations baseless and false, but still accepted the vote by Congress and promised not to take any other legal action.

== Timeline ==
=== 9 November ===
A demonstration at the Plaza de Armas of Trujillo following the removal of Vizcarra on 9 November

President Martín Vizcarra was summoned to testify and present his defense to Congress at 10 am PET. After hours of parliamentary debate, the Congress of Peru voted to convict the President with 105 votes in favor, surpassing the 87 vote threshold for conviction. Following the vote, crowds began to gather at Plaza San Martín in protest. An incident occurred in Plaza Bolívar, outside of Congress, in which congressman Ricardo Burga was assaulted by a protestor when giving a press conference regarding the impeachment vote. Demonstrations spawned in other parts of the country and continued well into midnight, past the 11 p.m. curfew imposed by the government in response to the COVID-19 pandemic in Peru.

=== 10 November ===
Following the inauguration of congressional leader Manuel Merino as president, demonstrations increased from early in the morning to the evening. Under the slogan "Merino does not represent me", from early in the morning they began to mobilize in the direction of the Legislative Palace, which was stopped by the National Police of Peru (NPP).

A large number of protesters were mobilized to Plaza San Martín, where the NPP impeded protestors using tear gas and making multiple arrests. There were other confrontations between protesters and the NPP in Jirón de la Unión, while the former were dispersed when trying to approach en masse the Government Palace of Peru. Various demonstrations and arrests were recorded in regions and cities of the country, such as Arequipa, Trujillo, Chiclayo, Huancayo and Iquitos. Hundreds of people gathered in the main squares and streets of Huancayo, Cuzco, Apurímac, Tacna and Puno. In Lima there were at least 16 arrested, according to Congresswoman Carolina Lizárraga.

=== 11 November ===
In the morning, news outlets reported that Merino called his predecessor's Minister of Internal Affairs, César Gentile, suggesting that he was concerned that the protests were not being controlled. Gentile responded to Merino's hint by exclaiming "I am no longer the Minister of the Interior!" and resigning the post in his phone call with Merino.

As a way to maintain measures of social distancing, hundreds of protesters in Lima and the other major cities of the country carried out cacerolazos in multi-family residential buildings and "honks" in the streets against the Merino and in support of the ousted president Martín Vizcarra.

During this day, there were peaceful demonstrations in city center of Lima, and other districts such as Miraflores and Surco, where groups of young people came to the front of the National Superintendence of University Education (SUNEDU) to demand that SUNEDU respect the autonomy in the licensing of universities and the autonomy of this institution. In Huancavelica, about 5,000 residents tried to take control of the Mantaro hydroelectric plant, they were dispersed with tear gas bombs thrown by the police. In Puerto Maldonado, more than twenty people were detained and one journalist was injured during demonstrations.

The Justice and Human Rights Commission of the Congress of the Republic refused to summon the Deputy Commander General of the National Police of Peru to testify for the arrests in the midst of the protests.

=== 12 November ===
Protests at Plaza San Martín on 12 November

The National March, beginning at 5 pm PET, occurred throughout Peru to demand the resignation of President Manuel Merino, with a primary location being at Plaza San Martín. Richard Cisneros, who was the singer involved in Vizcarra's first impeachment scandal, arrived at the plaza minutes before the march began, angering protesters who threw objects at him until he took refuge inside a nearby fast food store. The newly named Minister of Justice, Delia Muñoz, described calls for protests as "propaganda" while new Minister of Labor Juan Sheput falsely said "the protests are waning" and told the public that businesses would be hurt by the protests.

Protests occurred in the major cities of Peru, including Arequipa, Chiclayo, Chimbote, Cuzco, Huaraz, Iquitos, Lima, Tacna, Trujillo and Tumbes. In Cuzco, at least 18,000 people gathered in the city square where dancers and bands performed among the crowds. Merino's home state of Tumbes saw more than a thousand protestors against his government. Protesters in Tacna demanded a radical change in what they described as a neoliberal Constitution and expressed their rejection of the government of Manuel Merino.

In Lima, the large crowds overwhelmed police who began to indiscriminately disperse tear gas at protesters. In an incident caught on video, an alleged undercover TERNA agent of the National Police of Peru fires his weapon into the air to repel protesters who were following him.

Popular Action congressman Hans Troyes revealed that representatives from his party were under pressure from its alternate spokesman, Ricardo Burga, to vote in favor of Vizcarra's removal under threat of not having certain projects they favored processed.

=== 13 November ===
Merino's prime minister, Ántero Flores Aráoz, thanked the National Police for their response to protests stating "I thank you for always proceeding in compliance with human rights and protocol, logically avoiding harm, but reacting when you have to react."

During the afternoon, some protesters in the City of Lima, went to march to different media that were recognized in the country, some like América TV, Latina Televisión, ATV and Panamericana Television. This after the accusation of different political personalities, who said that the citizen demonstrations were from small sectors and would not have much relevance, including also due to the denunciation of some journalists from TV Peru who manifested attacks against freedom of expression by of the Government to minimize the marches that occurred in the country. Days later, some protesters came to march in front of the channel Willax Television, after some attacks by some journalists against the protesters.

In the evening, cacerolazos occurred and at Merino's home in San Borja District, protesters used a projector on his apartment building shining images denouncing him. Protesters attempted to march to Flores Aráoz's home in La Molina District, though several streets surrounding the area were blocked by National Police, resulting in clashes.

=== 14 November ===
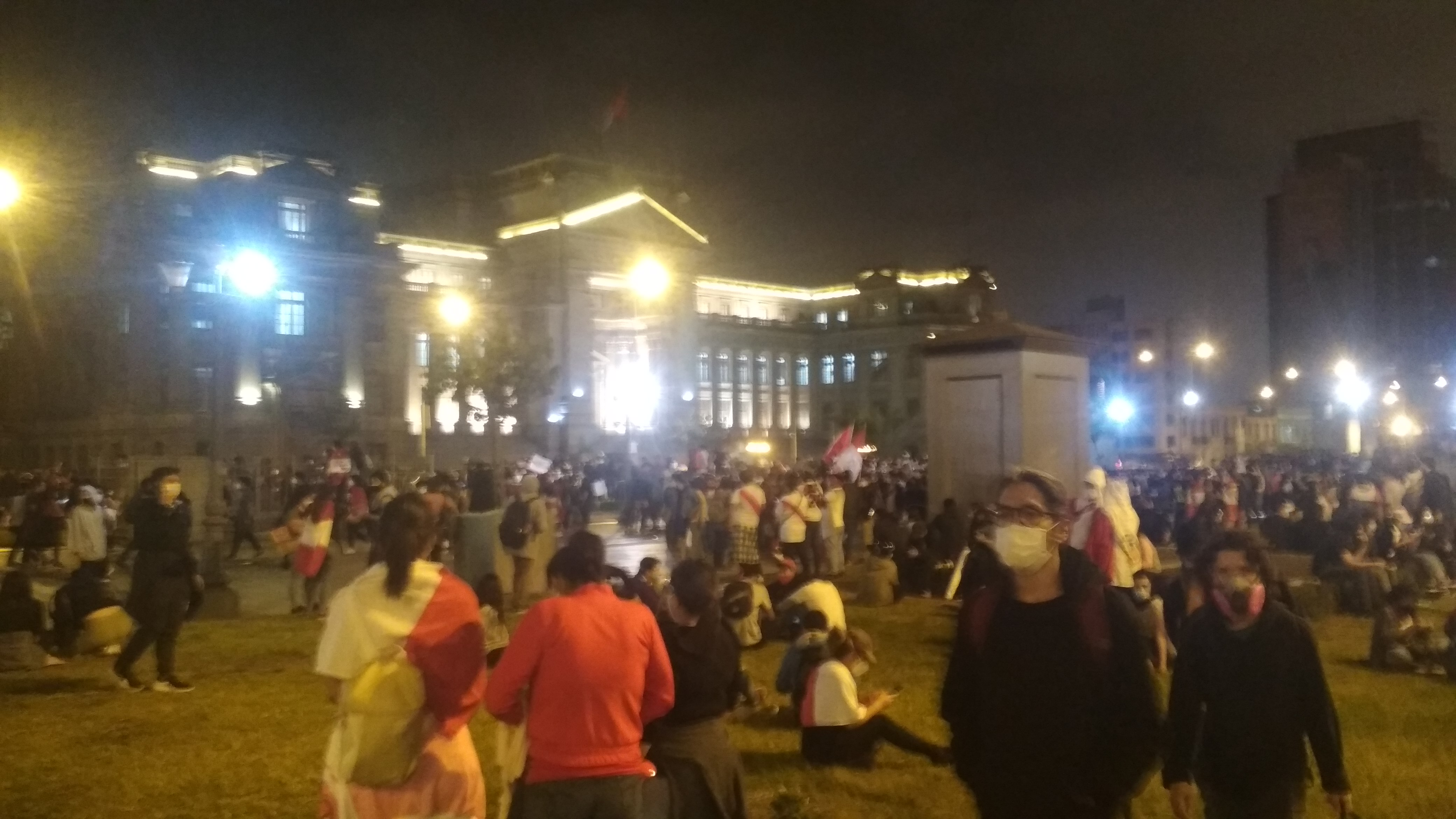
Protests near the Palace of Justice on 14 November

A second National March occurred against the Merino government, with tens of thousands of demonstrators gathering throughout Peru. Protesters attempted to march to the Legislative Palace and were blocked by police, with authorities firing tear gas into the crowd while some demonstrators fired fireworks at officers. Percy Castillo, a representative of the ombudsman, called for the cessation of tear gas usage, stating "Our staff have also been affected by gas, if there has been no motivation, there is no justification for tear gas. It is a demand of the ombudsman".

At least two died during clashes, with the father of Jordán Inti Sotelo Camargo, who was killed earlier that day, saying in an interview "Four pellets. He was bleeding from a gunshot wound to the heart and his heart has exploded. ... Ántero Flores-Aráoz said 'nothing happens, nothing happens' here something is happening, my 24-year-old son, a tourism student, is dead, ... Gentlemen, I ask you from the bottom of my heart to retire". When news reports emerged of the deaths, spontaneous cacerolazos and shouting condemning Merino began in Lima.

Following the reports of deaths, resignations of multiple Merino government officials begin to occur, these included:

- Minister of the Interior – Gastón Rodríguez
- Minister of Justice – Delia Muñoz
- Minister of Health – Abel Salinas
- Minister of Economy and Finance – José Arista
- Minister of Education – Fernando D'Alessio
- Minister of Foreign Trade and Tourism – Mara Seminario
- Minister of Women – Patricia Teullet
- Minister of Development and Social Inclusion – Federico Tong
- Minister of Culture – María del Carmen Reparaz
- Minister of Energy – Carlos Herrera Descalzi
- Minister of Housing – Hilda Sandoval

Prime Minister Ántero Flores-Araóz refused to resign, stating "The president took me as premier, if he stays, I'll stay with him, if he leaves and resigns, I'll go with him". The prime minister also supported the actions of authorities, saying "I defend the police because they attack them and it is unfortunate for everyone. It is not a question of who did this or that" and "The demonstrations end very badly because there are antisocial people and there have been acts not only of violence but also of destruction of public, private, and commercial works".

Merino called for the heads of the armed forces to attend an emergency meeting at the Government Palace, though they refused in what The Washington Post described as "[t]he final straw" of Merino's presidency. Calls from congress for Merino's consideration of resigning also occur, with president of congress Luis Valdez stating that the Board of Spokespersons would meet on 15 November at 8:00 am PET to discuss Merino's possible resignation.

=== 15 November ===
In the early morning, speculation of Merino fleeing the country emerged after it was reported that Jorge Chávez International Airport was closed by its operator, Lima Airport Partners. Merino later appeared before congress and presented his resignation, only five days after taking office.

=== 16 November ===
The funeral procession and burial of Inti Sotelo occurred in the cemetery Campo Fe in Huachipa. Words of his mother: "my son said goodbye to me and told me. I'm going to give my life for my country."

During the evening hours, protesters marched demanding a new constitution and called for justice of those injured and killed during demonstrations.

=== 17 November ===
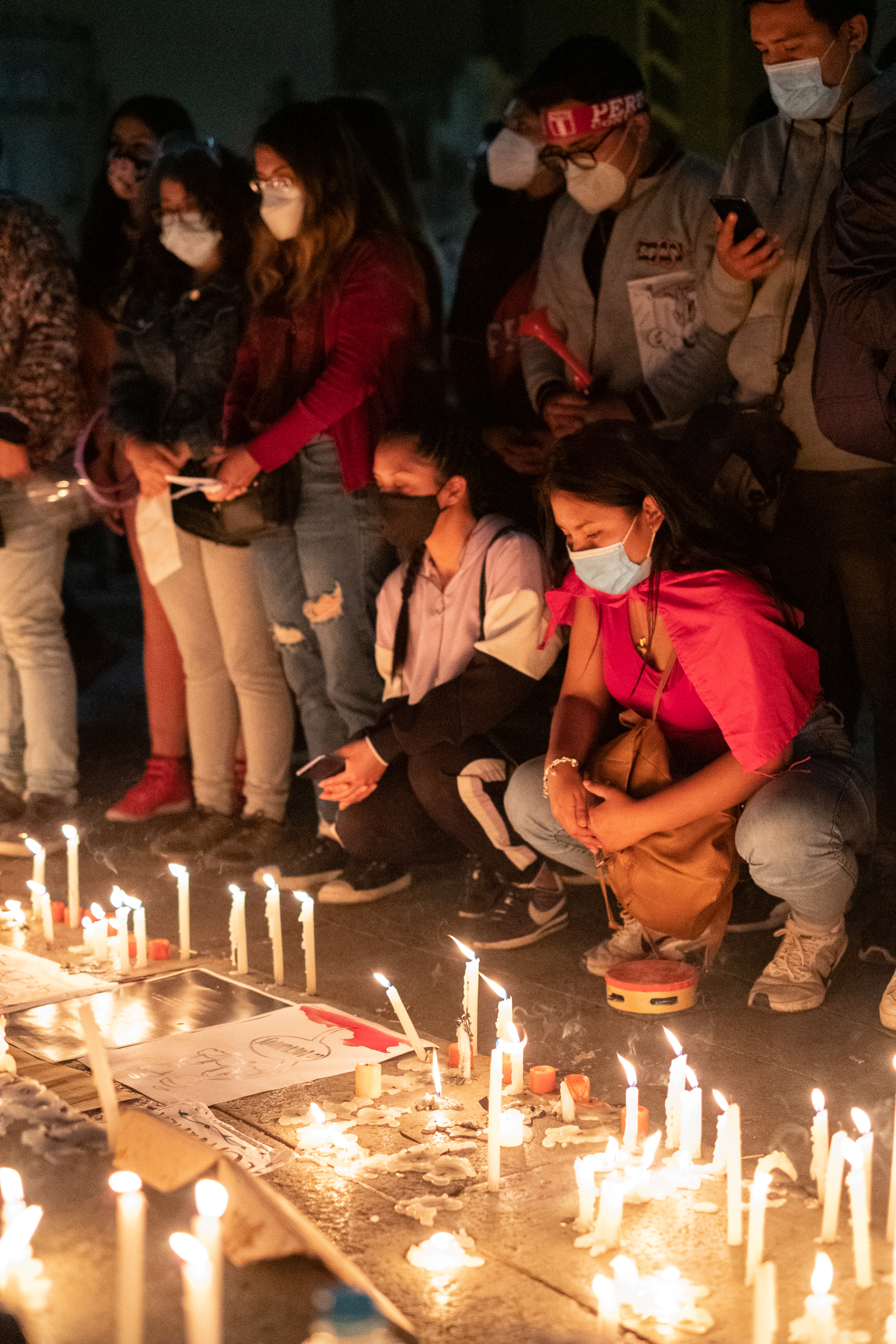
A crowd in Lima on 17 November gathers at a memorial for the two killed during protests

Francisco Sagasti was officially inaugurated as President of Peru, with his first act as president being a minute of silence for the two young men killed during the protests, stating, "Let it be my first words to ask for a minute of silence in tribute to young citizens Jack Bryan Pintado Sánchez and Jordan Inti Sotelo Camargo, unfortunately killed during the last days of citizen mobilization, carried out in legitimate exercise of the fundamental right to protest". After the minute of silence, he spoke to the parents of the deceased seated in congress, "On behalf of the State, we apologize to their families, to them and to all the young people who marched to defend democracy, and who made us remember what the vocation of service is".

=== Subsequent events ===
==== 18 November ====
President Sagasti officially appointed members of his cabinet and Violeta Bermúdez is appointed the new Prime Minister. Protests continued despite the removal of Merino from office, with protesters demanding the creation of a constituent assembly and more labor rights. However, protesters whose motives were originally praised by the media were described as terrucos when they began to make labor rights demands.

==== 21 November ====
Protesters gather in Plaza San Martín a week after the two deaths occur, demanding justice for the men killed and calling for a new constitution. President Sagasti tells protesters that he will ensure their safety and prohibit the National Police from confronting peaceful protesters.

==== 30 November ====
Agricultural worker rights protests begin in the Ica Province, a major location for agriculture in Peru. Hundreds of farm workers went on strike and blocked the Pan-American Highway, the country's main transportation artery, between Pisco and Ica while demanding better work conditions.

==== 1 December ====
Commander General Orlando Velasco is removed from leading the National Police and replaced with General César Cervantes by President Sagasti following the response of the law enforcement agency during protests. Over a dozen high-ranked officers resign in disapproval of the decision and expanded investigations while some law enforcement officials called for a police strike.

==== 2 December ====
Interior Minister Rubén Vargas resigns following the change to leadership within the National Police, with Cluber Aliaga being named his successor.

Shortages of some products begin to occur in the Ica Province due to the agrarian protests. Several trucks loaded with goods sat stranded on the Pan-American Highway due to blockages.

==== 3 December ====
Strong protests occur in the Chao Valley and Virú Valley near Trujillo, with the Special Services Unit of the Peruvian National Police entering the area to remove roadblocks and disperse protesters. One worker protesting spoke to La República stating "We earn 39 soles ($10.85 USD) a day, we do not have job stability. ... We demand a salary for all for equality". An agricultural worker protesting in Virú was killed after being shot in the head. Following his death, calls for a national march were made among Peruvians to condemn his death and demand enhanced labor rights, with a protest being scheduled to occur the next day on 4 December. President Sagasti condemned the death, stating "We will investigate what happened, we do not want anyone to die for defending labor rights".

==== 4 December ====
Miners in La Oroya District began to join protests, blocking a nearby part of the Pan-American Highway. That night, congress voted to repeal the agrarian law and planned to meet later for a replacement bill. Shortly after the act of congress, protests dissipated on the highway.

==== 5 December ====
The Peruvian Medical Federation (FMP) announces that it will begin an indefinite national strike in January 2021 after not receiving adequate responses from the Minister of Health.

==== 7 December ====
Cluber Aliaga – named Interior Minister just five days earlier – resigns in disagreement with President Sagasti, arguing that the use of force by police was justified due to alleged violence initiated by protesters and that the dismissal of eighteen generals of the National Police was done too quickly. José Elice Navarro of the Purple Party was named as the next Interior Minister.

== Protest violence ==
A protester injured on 12 November after police dispersed tear gas at Plaza San Martín

=== Casualties ===
During demonstrations on 12 November, the use of rubber bullets and tear gas was reported near the large protests in the Lima District. Reports emerged that protesters and journalists were injured from authorities firing rubber bullets. The Press and Society Institute (IPYS) condemned the injuries of at least three journalists who were directly fired at by police while the Peruvian Press Council denounced the detention and attacks on at least twenty press workers. Two protesters were seriously injured, with a total of fourteen individuals reported injured, according to the Minister of Health.

The first deaths occur on 14 November, with two killed; a 25-year-old and Jordán Inti Sotelo Camargo, who was 24 years old. Both were killed after being shot by police. The third death was 19-year-old Jorge Yener Muñoz Jiménez, who was killed during agricultural labor rights protests on 3 December.

==== Human rights concerns ====
Amnesty International demanded on 10 November that the authorities stop the repression of the demonstrations and that people's rights be guaranteed.

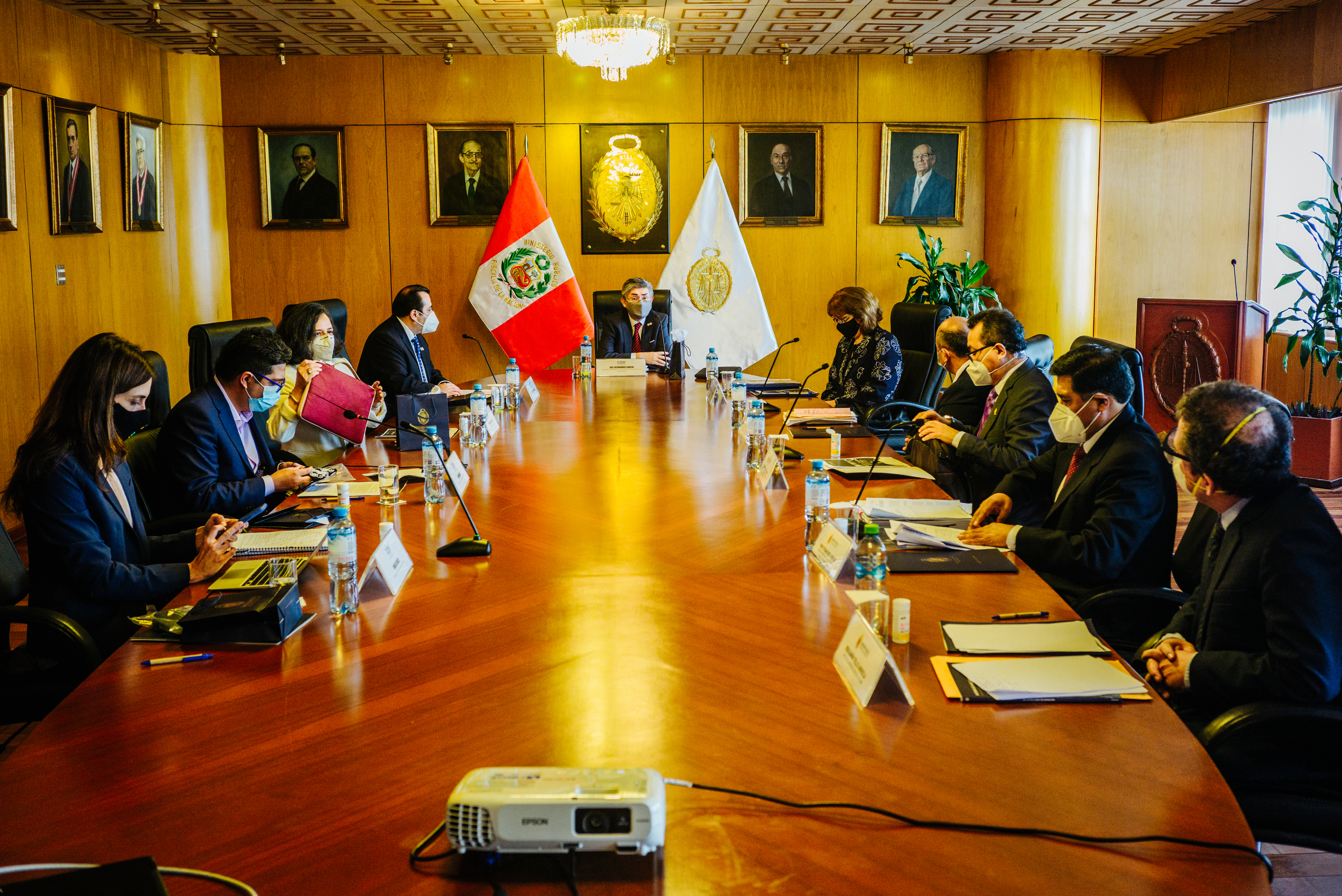
Delegates of the IACHR meeting in Lima on 2 December 2020

Following the National March on 12 November, the Inter-American Commission on Human Rights (IACHR) and the United Nations Peru condemned the disproportional use of force by authorities. In a statement, the IACHR said, "According to the information received, the Police have used tear gas and pellets on a massive scale against protesters and journalists. This contravenes the IACHR standards on the right to protest" and that demanded the Merino government "to refrain from engaging in indiscriminate detention practices". Christian Sanchez, National Information Officer of United Nations Peru, described the protests as "mostly peaceful in nature", stating:

"As a result of the police action in recent days, and particularly in the massive marches on Thursday 12, there have been injuries, including protesters and journalists. It is necessary to remember that the arbitrary and indiscriminate use of non-lethal weapons violates the principle of proportionality and violates international standards, which require precaution, necessity and proportionality in police action. Likewise, there have been violations of the detainees' right to due process, including arrests of adolescent protesters."

Following the deaths on 14 November, Americas director for Amnesty International, Erika Guevara, stated, "We demand an end to the repression and the investigation and punishment for all the human rights violations which are being registered". Also that evening, Human Rights Watch director of the Americas José Miguel Vivanco also released a statement, saying, "We continue to document cases of police brutality in downtown Lima. Everything indicates that the repression against peaceful protesters is intensifying. The Police must suspend the use of pellets".

== Reactions ==
=== International ===
==== International bodies ====
- Organization of American States – The OAS General Secretariat Luis Almagro expressed his concern about the current political situation in Peru, in the context of the COVID-19 pandemic. The IACHR expressed its concern about the crisis generated after the vacancy of former President Vizcarra.
- United Nations – The United Nations said that it had found that plainclothes police officers had proceeded to arbitrary arrests during the protests, and expressed disapproval thereof.

==== Governments ====
- Argentina – The foreign ministry stated "We trust in the commitment to carry out a democratic transition and to respect the ongoing electoral process", considering it a "difficult transition".
- Brazil – The foreign ministry released a statement expressing support for the Merino government.
- Chile – The foreign ministry released a statement supporting President Merino.
- El Salvador – President of El Salvador Nayib Bukele released a statement saying that El Salvador does not recognize Merino's government, calling it a "coup government".
- Paraguay – The foreign ministry released a statement supporting President Merino.
- Uruguay – The foreign ministry released a statement supporting President Merino.
- Venezuela – Disputed President Nicolás Maduro expressed support for the protesters and youth of Peru.

=== Domestic ===
==== Institutions ====
The Ombudsman's Office pointed out that the police should make a proportionate use of force and should not exceed it. The Public Ministry ordered the prosecutors to carry out urgent actions to guarantee the rights of the people during the days of protests. The National Human Rights Coordinator denounced that the rights of people detained in police stations are not being respected. The National University of San Marcos, through a statement, indicated that it rejects "any political act that violates governance and constitutional order".

==== Politicians ====
The presidential pre-candidate Verónika Mendoza referred to the current situation, stating that if Manuel Merino assumes the presidency of Peru, his mandate will be illegitimate.

The presidential pre-candidate Julio Guzmán, leader of the Purple Party, in the morning of November 10, 2020, stated the following on Twitter: "The Purple Party will not attend the swearing-in of Manuel Merino to the presidency of Peru. We will not participate in an illegitimate seizure of power".

Former president Ollanta Humala considers that it is foolish to impeach Martín Vizcarra given the situation in Peru, partly due to the pandemic, although he must be investigated.

==== Memorials ====
Artists Elliot Túpac and Decertor created mural Memoria to honor Inti Sotelo and Bryan Pintado at the Aldo Chamochumbi coliseum in Magdalena del Mar. It was painted over in June 2022 after being vandalized.

== See also ==
- 2017-present Peruvian political crisis
- 2022 Peruvian protests
- 2019 Bolivian political crisis
- 2019–20 Chilean protests
- 2019–2020 Colombian protests
- 2019 Ecuadorian protests
- Venezuelan presidential crisis
