= Purple Party =

Purple Party Partido Morado
- Abbreviation: PM
- President: Luis Durán Rojo
- General Secretary: Luis Alberto Arias Minaya
- Founded: 18 November 2016; 9 years ago
- Legalised: 4 March 2019; 7 years ago
- Split from: All for Peru
- Headquarters: Lima
- Youth wing: Purple Youth
- Membership (2023): 22,264
- Ideology: Social liberalism; Progressivism; Third Way
- Political position: Centre; Factions: Left-wing to centre-right
- Colors: Purple
- Congress: 0 / 130
- Governorships: 0 / 25
- Regional Councillors: 0 / 274
- Province Mayorships: 0 / 196
- District Mayorships: 0 / 1,874

Website
- partidomorado.pe/

The Purple Party (Spanish: Partido Morado, PM) is a centrist, liberal, and progressive political party in Peru. The color purple was chosen to represent the blending of red and blue, the colors of left and right-wing parties in Peru, symbolizing the centrist ideology of the party.

== History ==
On 17 October 2016, Julio Guzmán led the First Purple Summit in Lima, Peru, announcing the organization's first steps towards making a party. More than 1,000 individuals participated in establishing guidelines for the political movement. At the Second Purple Summit ( 14–15 October 2017), held in Cusco, with the participation of more than 1,000 national representatives, the presentation of their file for party registration with the corresponding Peruvian body was reported. On 18 November 2017, the party was officially founded. At the Third Purple Summit ( 13–14 October 2018), held in Ayacucho, where more than 1,300 representatives from all over the country attended, the registration and consolidation work of the next party to be formalized was evaluated. After a long process of signature collection for registration, the party was legally recognized by the National Elections Jury on 4 March 2019.

At the Fourth Purple Summit ( 25–26 October 2019), held in Trujillo. The assembly had 1800 representatives, and its objective was to prepare the organization of the party for the next extraordinary congressional elections in January of the following year.

On the other hand, Alberto de Belaunde and Gino Costa from the Liberal Bench joined the Purple Party and won respective seats during the extraordinary parliamentary elections of 2020.

At the 2020 snap parliamentary election on 26 January 2020, the party won 7.4% of the popular vote and 9 out of 130 seats in the Congress of the Republic.

=== Presidency of Francisco Sagasti ===
==== Background ====
Following the removal of Martín Vizcarra and Manuel Merino's ascension to the presidency, the 2020 Peruvian protests kicked-off. The party's congressional caucus voted against Vizcarra's removal, being the only party which remained in full-opposition to the political move. Refusing to attend Merino's inauguration, congressman Daniel Olivares plead for the release of arbitrarily detained citizens at police stations, while Guzmán participated in the protests. The rest of the caucus remained vigilant against actions taken by Merino's government, which ended on 15 November 2020, only five days into his presidency.

As Merino's resignation was accepted, Congress voted to elect a new Congress President between the 19 congress members who voted against Vizcarra's removal on 9 November. Talks to select a Purple congressman for the position initiated. Congressman Gino Costa was the first proposal, but was unanimously rejected by the rest of caucuses. On the evening of 15 November 2020, Francisco Sagasti was proposed to run for the First Vice Presidency of Congress in a multiparty list led by leftist congresswoman Rocío Silva-Santisteban (FA). The single list was officially rejected by Congress, prompting to hold the election till the next day. In this second election, Francisco Sagasti led the multiparty list. As the second list led by María Teresa Cabrera (PP) was not approved to run for filing irregularities, the election was imminent. With 97 votes in favor, Sagasti was elected President of Congress, and was inaugurated on the next day as President of Peru to fulfill the 2016–2021 term.

=== 2021 general election ===
In September 2020, the Purple Party formally signed a political accord with Citizen Force, a political party which lacks registration in order to participate independently or formally allied in an election, in order to prepare for the 2021 general election. As a result of this accord, LGBT activist Susel Paredes registered in the party. Initially slated for the ticket as a possible running-mate for Julio Guzmán, she was ultimately selected to lead the congressional list for the Lima constituency.

On 23 October 2020, former Miraflores mayoral candidate, Alejandro San Martín, officially registered an alternative ticket for the primary election. Two days later, congresswoman Carolina Lizárraga announced her candidacy for the Purple Party's presidential nomination. Facing a competitive primary, Julio Guzmán filed his ticket on 28 October 2020. Choosing former Minister of Education, Flor Pablo, and congressman Francisco Sagasti, as his first and second running mate, his campaign was put on halt as the 2020 Peruvian protests started. Negotiations on which Purple congressman would assume the presidency were tumultuous, as Sagasti was viewed as the only consensus candidate for the role. Reports stated Guzmán ultimately accepted the proposal, thus making Sagasti quit the ticket as second running mate in order to assume the presidency until July 2021.

On the primary election held on 29 November 2020, Guzmán was selected as the party's presidential nominee with 77% of the vote, while Carolina Lizárraga placed second with 19.2%, and Alejandro San Martín attained only 3.8%. Guzmán ultimately placed 10th in the election with 2.3% of the vote. The party only won 3 seats in the congressional election. The party was supposed to be dissolved after the 2021 elections on 9 September 2021 but on 2 October 2021, the public hearing was held before the plenary session of the National Elections Jury and, that same day, the resolution was issued which, according to Tello, revoked the ROP resolution and returned the party's registration.

=== Post-presidency ===
At the 2022 regional and municipal elections, the Purple Party had their worst performance ever in their electoral history as the party failed to achieve office at this level.

The party’s initial three congressional representatives remained ambivalent in the impeachment processes against Pedro Castillo throughout his ill-fated presidency, taking varying stances that caused controversy. In August 2022, representative Edward Málaga refused to join the Integrity and Development caucus, leaving the party with only two representatives. Four months later, Susel Paredes announced she was quitting the party to join First The People – Community, Ecology, Liberty, and Progress, leaving Flor Pablo as the only purple representative in Congress until her resignation from the party in February 2024.

In the aftermath of Pablo’s exit from the party, a wave of members quit the party to join Marisol Pérez Tello and Pablo’s new political project, Lo Justo por el Perú, party which in turn failed to register on time at the National Jury of Elections in order to participate of the 2026 general election. Subsequently, Lo Justo was annexed by First The People – Community, Ecology, Liberty, and Progress, currently the political harbor for former Purple Party members.

== Election results ==
=== Presidential election ===
Election	Candidate	First round		Second round		Result
Election	Candidate	Votes	%	Votes	%	Result
2021	Julio Guzmán	325,608	2.26	—N/a		Lost ✗
2026	Mesías Guevara	82,196	0.49	—N/a		Lost ✗

=== Congressional elections ===
==== Unicameral Congress of the Republic ====
Year	Votes	%	Seats	+/–	Position
2020	1,095,491	7.40%	9 / 130	▲9	Opposition
2021	697,289	5.42%	3 / 130	▼7	Minority

==== Chamber of Deputies ====
Election	Leader	Votes	%	Seats	+/–	Rank	Government
2026	Luis Durán Rojo	88,017	0.61	0 / 130	▼3	▼26th	Extra-parliamentary

==== Senate ====
Election	Leader	Votes	%	Seats	+/–	Rank	Government
2026	Luis Durán Rojo	72,942	0.49	0 / 60		▲25th	Extra-parliamentary
