= Patricia Teullet =

Peruvian politician

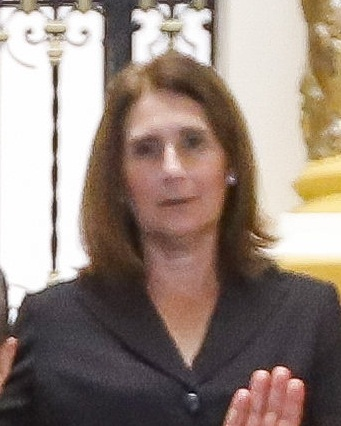

Minister of Women and Vulnerable Populations
- In office 12 November 2020 – 17 November 2020
- President: Manuel Merino
- Prime Minister: Ántero Flores Aráoz
- Preceded by: Rosario Sasieta
- Succeeded by: Silvia Loli

Personal details
- Born: 5 March 1960 (age 66) Lima, Peru

Patricia Lisetta Teullet Pipoli (born 5 March 1960) is a Peruvian politician. She served as the Minister of Women and Vulnerable Populations in the presidency of Manuel Merino.

== Biography ==
Teullet completed her school studies at the Villa María School in Lima. She studied economics at the Universidad del Pacífico, where she obtained the professional title of Economist. She pursued a Master's in Administration at Universidad La Salle México. In the same way, she majored in Foreign Trade Policy at Harvard University's John F. Kennedy School of Government. In 1981, she joined the Development Finance Corporation (COFIDE) as a specialist in the area of international finance. She remained at the institution until 1984.

In May 1996, Teullet was appointed Vice Minister of Social Development of the Ministry of the Presidency by President Alberto Fujimori. She held the position until November of the same year. From 1997 to 1999, she was an advisor to the Presidency of the Development Finance Corporation (COFIDE). In 1999, she was appointed General Manager of the Foreign Trade Society (COMEX).

On 2 August 2001, Teullet was appointed Vice Minister of Economy by President Alejandro Toledo, a position she held under the management of Pedro Pablo Kuczynski in the Ministry of Economy and Finance. She resigned from the position in April 2002. After leaving the vice ministry, she returned to the Foreign Trade Society (COMEXPERU). From 2012 to 2015, she was the General Director of Aporta Desarrollo Sostenible.
