= Terna =

Terna may refer to:

== Places ==
- Terňa, a village in the Prešov Region of Slovakia
- Terna River, Latur District, Maharashtra, India

== Religion ==
- A terna is a list of three candidates for the office of bishop used in the episcopal selection process of the Roman Catholic Church

== People ==
- Fredrick Terna (1923–2022), Austrian-born American artist

== Companies ==
- Terna - Rete Elettrica Nazionale, the Italian electricity transmission operator
- GEK Terna, a Greek construction industry conglomerate
- Terna Energy, electric utilities branch of the Greek conglomerate GEK Terna

== Organisations ==
- Grupo Terna, a unit of the National Police of Peru
