= Citizen Force (Peru) =

Political party from Peru

Citizen Force Fuerza Ciudadana
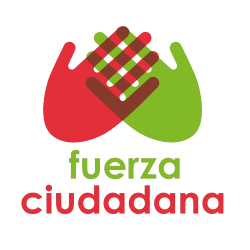
- Abbreviation: FC
- General Secretary: Juan Carlos Vizcarra
- Spokesperson: Carlos Tapia
- Founded: 3 October 2019
- Merger of: Decentralist Social Force; Citizens for Change
- Merged into: First The People – Community, Ecology, Liberty, and Progress
- Headquarters: Lima
- Ideology: Democratic socialism Progressivism
- Political position: Centre-left to left-wing
- Seats in the Congress: 1 / 130

Citizen Force (Spanish: Fuerza Ciudadana) was a democratic socialist and progressive political party from Peru. Founded in October 2019, the party was institutionalized out of the union of the Decentralist Social Force and Citizens for Change. In 2022, it merged into First The People – Community, Ecology, Liberty, and Progress.

== History ==
Formally announced following the dissolution of the Congress of the Republic of Peru, the party participated in the Together for Peru coalition for the 2020 parliamentary election. Upon the election's poor results as no seats were won, the party left the coalition, and filed for official registration at the National Jury of Elections.

The registration was ultimately unsuccessful, as the party was not going to reach the deadline in order to fully participate as a recognized organization at the 2021 general election. Days before the deadline, the party signed a political accord with the registered Purple Party in order to run together for the upcoming election. Among its members, LGBT activist Susel Paredes registered in the Purple Party and was selected to lead the congressional list for the constituency of Lima. Paredes was ultimately elected Congresswoman for Lima.

== Electoral history ==
=== Presidential election ===
Year	Nominee	Party	Votes	Percentage	Outcome
2021	Julio Guzmán	Purple Party	325,608	2.26	10th

=== Elections to the Congress of the Republic ===
Year	Votes	%	Seats	▲/▼	Position
2020	710,462 as part of Together for Peru	4.80%	0 / 130	Steady	Minority
2021	697,289 as part of the Purple Party. Only 1 from Citizen Force.	5.42%	3 / 130	▲1	Minority
