= Daniel Olivares (politician) =

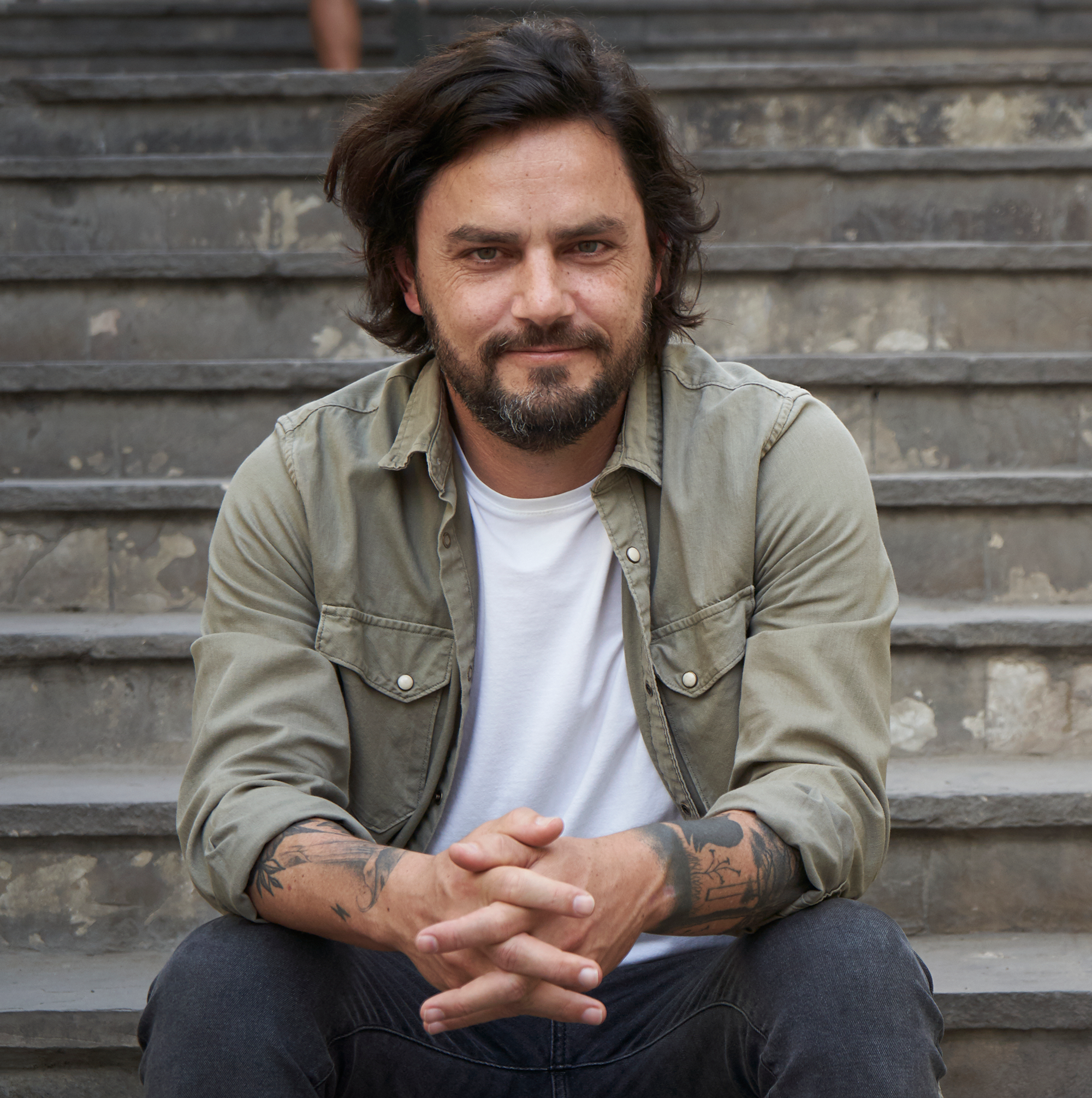

Parliamentary Spokesperson of the Purple Party
- In office 19 November 2020 – 26 July 2021
- Preceded by: Francisco Sagasti
- Succeeded by: Flor Pablo

Member of Congress
- In office 16 March 2020 – 26 July 2021
- Constituency: Lima

Personal details
- Born: 7 June 1981 (age 45) Lima, Peru
- Party: Purple Party (2020–present)
- Other political affiliations: All for Peru (2015-2019); Social Force Party (2010-2012)
- Education: University of Lima (LL.B.)
- Website: Official website

Daniel Federico Olivares Cortés (born 7 June 1981) is a Peruvian communicator and politician. A member of the Purple Party, he currently serves in the Peruvian Congress' complementary term 2020-2021 to finish the 2016-2021 term that was interrupted by the dissolution of Congress by Martín Vizcarra.

== Early life and education ==
Olivares was born in Lima in 1981, to Federico Olivares Pflücker and Teresa Cortés Massa. He completed his elementary education at the Immaculate Heart School, and high school at the Santa María Marianistas School.

Upon graduation, Olivares was admitted to the University of Lima School of Law, where he obtained a Bachelor of Law degree in 2009.

== Career ==
Leading up to the 2010 Lima municipal election, Olivares was one of the founders of the Decentralist Social Force Party, which led Susana Villarán to be elected Mayor of Lima. During Villarán's administration, Olivares served as the Municipality's Communications Advisor.

In 2012, Olivares founded Copiloto SAC, an advertising agency, which he led until August 2016. He remained the owner until 2020. Additionally, he served as a communications consultant for the Ministry of Labour and Promotion of Employment in 2013.

Upon leaving his advertisement agency, Olivares was hired by the Pedro Pablo Kuczynski administration as a communications advisor to Prime Minister of Peru, Fernando Zavala, and subsequently as Secretary of Social Communication from August to December 2017. In October 2017, he was appointed as a Board Member of Editora Perú (El Peruano) in representation of the Ministry of Economy and Finance, a position he held until his resignation in December 2017.

=== Political career ===
At the 2020 snap parliamentary election, Olivares was elected to the Congress of the Republic of Peru in the Lima constituency, as an invited candidate of the Purple Party.

On 19 November 2020, he became a spokesman for the Purple Party following the inauguration of his predecessor, Francisco Sagasti, as President of Peru.
