= Fernando Cillóniz =

Peruvian engineer, businessman, and politician

4th Governor of Ica
- In office 1 January 2015 – 31 December 2018
- Preceded by: Alonso Navarro Cabanillas
- Succeeded by: Javier Gallegos

Personal details
- Born: 15 December 1950 (age 75) Miraflores, Lima, Peru
- Party: Christian People's Party (2024–present)
- Other political affiliations: Independent (2021–2024; before 2020); All for Peru (2020–2021)
- Spouse: Mónica Guerrero Bueno
- Education: National University of Engineering (BS); University of Pennsylvania (MBA)

Fernando José Cillóniz Benavides (born 15 December 1950) is a Peruvian engineer and politician who served as Governor of the Ica Region from January 2015 to December 2018, elected as invited candidate under Popular Force.

Following his term as governor, Cillóniz announced a presidential bid for the 2021 general election with All for Peru. Formally attaining the nomination, his ticket was ultimately rejected by the National Jury of Elections due to the party's internal disputes.

Registered in the Christian People's Party since 2024, Cillóniz is currently a candidate for the party’s presidential nomination at the 2026 general election, advocating for a broad electoral coalition.

== Early life and education ==
Cillóniz was born in the urban district of Miraflores on 15 December 1950. His father, Augusto Cillóniz Garfias, owned the 150-acre land of Hacienda San José. On his mother's side, Ángela Benavides de la Quintana, he is nephew of mining engineer and billionaire Alberto Benavides de la Quintana, and cousin of economist Ismael Benavides Ferreyros and mining magnate Roque Benavides.

Upon graduating from the Santa María Marianistas School, Cillóniz was admitted in 1967 to the National University of Engineering, where he pursued a career in economic engineering. He graduated with a bachelor's degree in 1972, and subsequently completed a Master of Business Administration (MBA) at the Wharton School of the University of Pennsylvania.

== Career ==
Cillóniz has been director of the Interbank and member of the advisory council of the newspaper El Comercio. He also served as director of the National Council for the Environment (CONAM), as president of the Paracas Bay Rehabilitation and Sustainable Development Commission and as director of the National Cotton Board.

== Political career ==
=== Governor of Ica (2015–2018) ===
In the 2014 regional elections, Cillóniz ran in the regional elections for Governor of Ica under the Fujimorist Popular Force party. In the first round, held on 5 October 2014, he was in first place of the popular vote, ahead of candidate Javier Gallegos.

As none of the candidates reached 30% of the votes cast, Gallegos and Cillóniz competed in the run-off. On 7 December 2014, Cillóniz was elected Governor of Ica in the second round of the regional elections for the 2015–2018 term.

=== Presidential campaign (2020) ===
In September 2020, following an unsuccessful run for a seat in the Peruvian Congress at the 2020 snap-election with the Peru Secure Homeland as his candidacy was excluded, Cillóniz registered in All for Peru, in order to run for the party's presidential nomination.

Upon registering in the party, All for Peru leader Aureo Zegarra criticized Cillóniz for "not having the kindness of calling him". Cillóniz learned that the party was going through internal disputes, as the party's faction against Zegarra processed his party registration. Ultimately, the National Elections Jury officially recognized Zegarra's executive position in the party, and Cillóniz and Pedro Cateriano's party affiliation.

Cillóniz initially faced Cateriano in the primary election scheduled for 28 November 2020, but the latter eventually withdrew this candidacy, alleging the party disputes as the determinant factor in his decision. Party president Aureo Zegarra filed a claim against Cillóniz as he continued disputing the party affiliation as not-valid due to being registered by a non-official spokesman. The National Electoral Jury dismissed the claim, and Cillóniz was declared All for Peru's presumptive presidential nominee. However, on 26 December 2020, the presidential ticket was rejected by the National Jury of Elections.

=== Later career ===
Cillóniz is a member of the Madrid Forum, an international group of right-wing and far-right individuals organized by Vox.
