= Susel Paredes =

Peruvian lawyer, LGBT rights activist, and politician

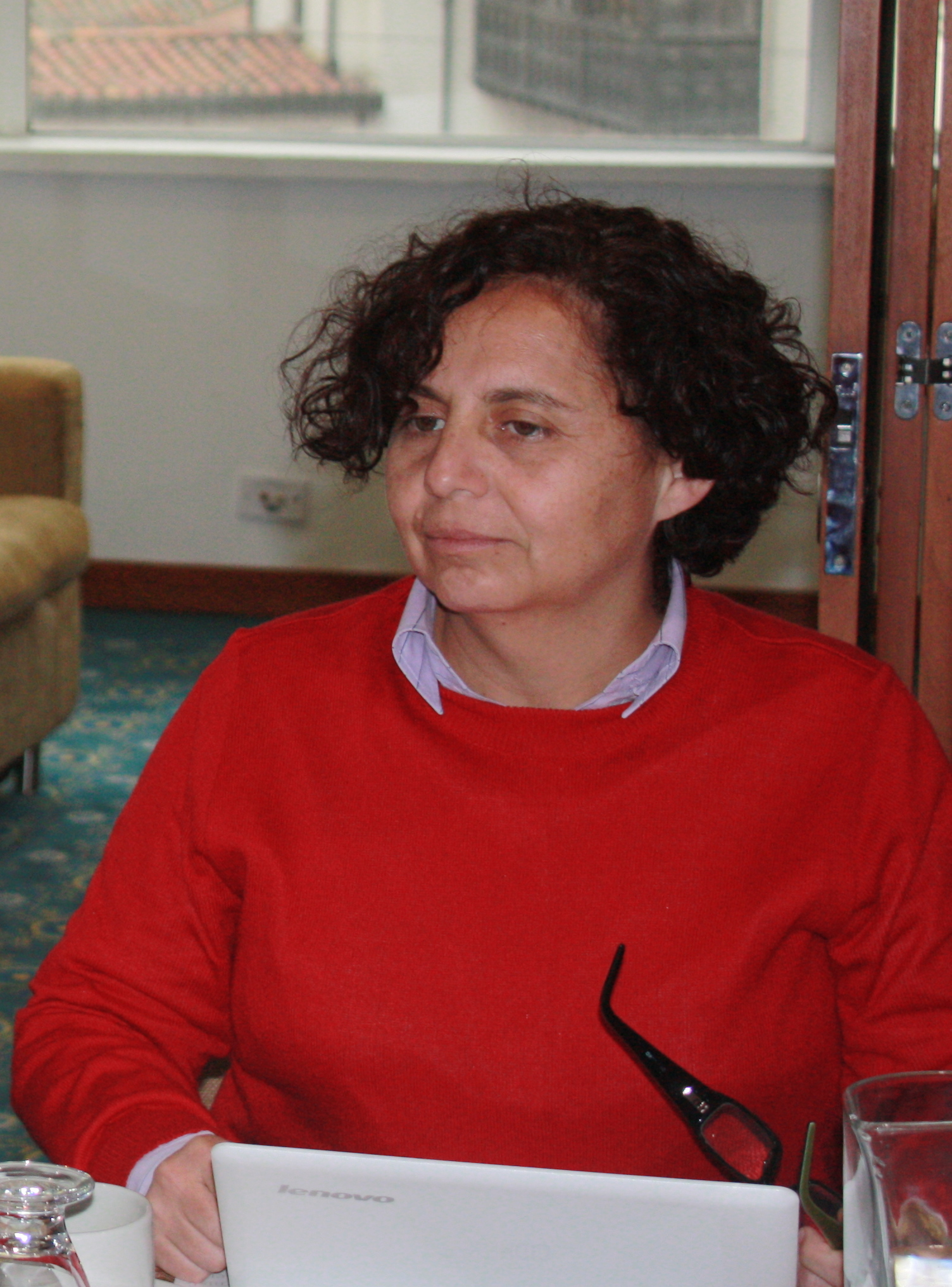

Member of Congress
- In office 27 July 2021 – 26 July 3026
- Constituency: Lima

Personal details
- Born: Susel Ana María Paredes Piqué; 26 July 1963 (age 63) Lima, Peru
- Party: First The People – Community, Ecology, Liberty, and Progress (since 2023)
- Other political affiliations: Citizen Force (2019–2023); Purple Party (2020–2022); Independent (2009–2019); Socialist Party (2004–2009)
- Spouse: Gracia María Aljovín (m. 2016)
- Occupation: Lawyer; Politician

Susel Ana María Paredes Piqué (born 26 July 1963) is a Peruvian lawyer, LGBT rights activist, and politician. She was elected to the Congress of the Republic of Peru for the 2021-2026 term.

== Early life and education ==
Paredes was born in Lima on 26 July 1963. She studied at the Colegio Mater Purissima in the city of Lima. She studied law at the National University of San Marcos, in which she received the professional title of lawyer. She completed a master's degree in comparative law at the Complutense University of Madrid and completed her doctorate studies in law at the same university. She also completed a master's degree in Amazon studies at the National University of San Marcos.

On the other hand, she studied at the TUC (Catholic University Theater School). Later, she was part of the cast of the telenovelas Carmín (PANTEL) and Los de arriba y los de bajo (ATV). And from the movie Todos somos estrellas.

She was a professor at the Marcelino Champagnat University.

== Activism and political career ==
Paredes has carried out various social aid activities in different areas of Peru, focusing on the human rights of people from less favored sectors. Likewise, she carries out activities in favor of the environment, women's rights, and gay rights. She has been a lawyer for the Flora Tristán Peruvian Women's Center and a consultant for Oxfam America. She is the founder of the LGBT Legal Civil Association, an association of homosexual lawyers.

Paredes was a member of the Socialist Party from 2004 to 2007, where she was a member of the Women's Committee. She ran for the Congress in the 2006 general elections, without obtaining a seat despite obtaining the second-highest vote for a candidate from her party in the country. She was elected as General Secretary of the Socialist Party on 2 March 2008. However, after several internal tensions, on 23 September 2009, she resigned with a sector of the said political group to form the Socialist Action Movement (MAS), which later joined the Land and Dignity party led by environmental activist Marco Arana.

Paredes supported the candidacy of Susana Villarán who successfully ran for mayor of Lima in the 2010 Lima municipal elections. During Villarán's management, Paredes was Manager of Inspection and Control in the Metropolitan Municipality of Lima until the end of 2014. She ran for Congress in the 2011 general elections for the Decentralist Social Force Party, but the party did not gain the required votes. For the 2014 Lima municipal elections, she was the Spokesperson for the Neighborhood Dialogue, a political group for which Villarán ran for reelection. From 2016 to 2017, Paredes was an advisor to the Safe Neighborhood program of the Ministry of the Interior.

In 2019, Paredes assumed the Supervision Management in La Victoria District, forming part of Mayor George Forsyth's team. She resigned at the end of 2019 and, subsequently, assumed a similar position in the Magdalena del Mar District under the command of mayor Carlomagno Chacón, who had defeated her in the 2018 Lima municipal election. In 2020, in preparation for the 2021 general elections, Paredes announced she had joined the Purple Party as part of an agreement between this party and Citizen Force, which did not have registration.

== Controversies ==
=== Former aide convicted of sexual offenses ===
In August 2023, the Peruvian Judiciary sentenced Marvin Gianinni Gómez Gonzales, who identified as Tiffany Gómez Gonzáles and had previously served as an aide in Susel Paredes’ congressional office, to life imprisonment for the rape of two minors under the age of 12 and for engaging in sexual acts with a 14-year-old minor.

According to the prosecution, the crimes occurred in January 2022 in the district of San Martín de Porres, Lima. Following public disclosure of the case in February 2022, Paredes announced the aide’s immediate removal from her congressional office.

Media reports indicated that prior to joining Congress, Gómez Gonzales had worked with Paredes at the District Municipality of Magdalena del Mar and at the Municipality of La Victoria in communications-related roles.

=== Investigation related to Qali Warma ===
In March 2025, Peruvian media reported that the National Police’s Directorate Against Corruption (Dircocor) had initiated investigative proceedings in connection with the Qali Warma school feeding program. The investigation reportedly focused on Gracia María Aljovín de Losada, Paredes’ spouse, regarding alleged irregularities linked to a company that supplied canned food products to the program.

According to the report, authorities requested the lifting of telecommunications secrecy and the review of banking movements as part of preliminary investigative actions. Media coverage indicated that the case could potentially involve scrutiny regarding disclosure of possible conflicts of interest; however, no judicial ruling against Paredes had been reported at the time of publication.

== Personal life ==
Paredes is openly lesbian, which she publicly announced to the Peruvian press in 2006. In 2016, she married her partner, Gracia María Aljovín in Miami under US marital law because it was not legal in her country.
