= Francisco Sagasti =

President of Peru from 2020 to 2021

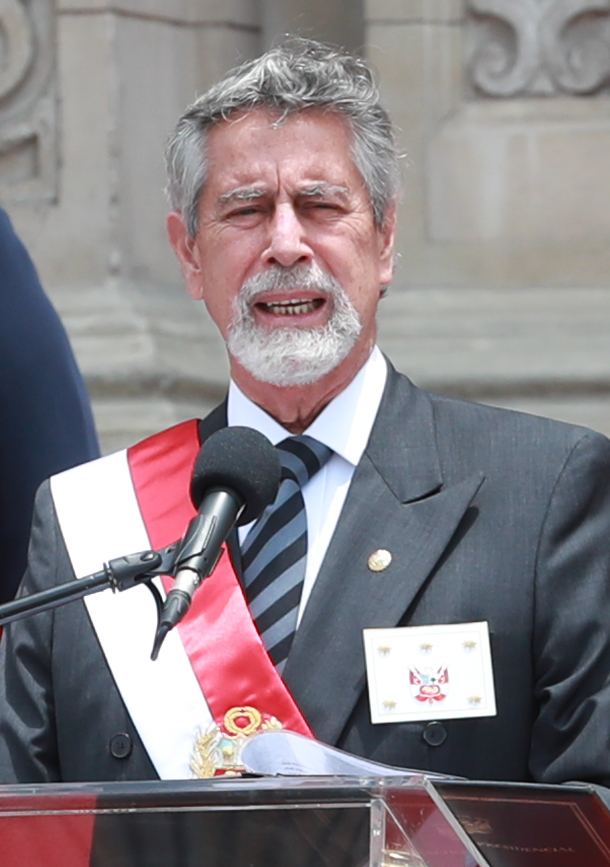
- Sagasti in 2020

President of Peru
- In office 17 November 2020 – 28 July 2021
- Prime Minister: Violeta Bermúdez
- Vice President: First Vice President; Vacant; Second Vice President; Vacant
- Preceded by: Manuel Merino
- Succeeded by: Pedro Castillo

President of Congress
- In office 16 November 2020 – 17 November 2020; On Leave: 17 November 2020 – 26 July 2021 (Note: Ascended into the presidency of Peru right after he took the role as the President of Congress, his roles in the Congress of the Republic was immediately suspended as soon as he took the presidency.)
- Vice President: 1st Vice President; Mirtha Vásquez; 2nd Vice President; Luis Roel Alva; 3rd Vice President; Matilde Fernández
- Preceded by: Rocío Silva-Santisteban (acting)
- Succeeded by: Mirtha Vásquez (acting)

Parliamentary Spokesperson of the Purple Party
- In office 16 March 2020 – 16 November 2020
- President: Julio Guzmán
- Preceded by: Position established
- Succeeded by: Daniel Olivares

Member of Congress
- In office 16 March 2020 – 17 November 2020
- Constituency: Lima

Personal details
- Born: 10 October 1944 (age 81) Lima, Peru
- Party: Purple Party (2016–present)
- Other political affiliations: Independent (2007–2017); Party for Social Democracy - Commitment Peru (1997–2007)
- Spouse: Leonor Beatriz Giusti Escobar (m. 1976–1992) Silvia Cristina de las Mercedes Charpentier Brenes (m. 1993; div. 2005)
- Children: 7: María Alejandra Pavez Giusti María Carolina Pavez Giusti María Leonor Pavez Giusti Pamela Andrea Pavez Giusti Francisco Rafael Sagasti Giusti Paulina Isabel Sagasti Giusti Amanda Sagasti Charpentier
- Parents: Francisco Sagasti Miller; Elsa Hochhäusler Reinisch
- Relatives: Francisco Sagasti Saldaña (grandfather)
- Education: National University of Engineering (BS); Pennsylvania State University (MS); University of Pennsylvania (PhD)
- Website: Official website; Presidency of Peru

Francisco Rafael Sagasti Hochhausler ([fɾanˈsisko rafaˈel saˈɣasti xoˈxawsleɾ]; born 10 October 1944) is a Peruvian engineer, academic, politician, and author who served as the president of Peru from November 2020 to July 2021.

Sagasti has worked as an advisor for economic development at the International Development Research Centre, World Bank, UNCSTD and the World Economic Forum. After the 1992 Peruvian constitutional crisis, Sagasti left his position at the World Bank to return to Peru. In 2016, he helped found the centrist Purple Party with Julio Guzmán. Following the dissolution of congress in 2019, he was elected into congress in January 2020, serving from March to November 2020 as a Member of Congress, representing the Lima constituency.

On 10 November 2020, following a controversial express impeachment and removal of President Martín Vizcarra by Congress due to allegations of "moral incapacity" (a 19th-century concept for mental incapacity), the President of Congress Manuel Merino became President of Peru. The impeachment was considered a covert parliamentary coup by many people, and after less than a week of violent repression of the resulting mass protests, Merino resigned as the country's leader on 15 November. On 16 November, Sagasti was elected by his fellow Congressmen to succeed Merino as president of Congress so that Sagasti could become President of Peru according to the presidential line of succession. On 17 November, Sagasti became President of Peru.

Sagasti's presidency called itself a "transitional and emergency government". Originally slated to run for the Second Vice Presidency with the Purple Party ticket for 2021 Peruvian general election, Sagasti quit the ticket in order to commit to his duties as President. His government coincided with the development of social conflicts such as the agrarian strike in Ica, Piura, La Libertad and Apurímac, which were resolved after the repeal of the so-called "Chlimper Law" that promoted investment in agriculture through meager labor benefits for workers from the field. Sagasti concluded the convoluted 2016–2021 presidential term on 28 July 2021, which had been started by Pedro Pablo Kuczynski on 28 July 2016 and had seen four different presidents.

== Early life and education ==
Francisco Sagasti was born in Lima, Peru, son of Francisco Sagasti Miller and Elsa Hochhausler Reinisch (1922–2002). He is the grandson of the national hero Francisco Sagasti Saldaña, victor of the Battle of Tarapacá. His mother's family emigrated from Austria and settled in Santiago de Chile. In Peru, his mother worked as a journalist, writing for newspapers El Comercio and La Prensa.

He enrolled in the National University of Engineering, where he graduated with a degree in industrial engineering. He attained a Master's degree (MSc) in industrial engineering at Pennsylvania State University, and completed a Doctor of Philosophy degree in operational research and social systems science at the Wharton School of the University of Pennsylvania.

== Career ==
=== Advisory career ===
==== Revolutionary government of Peru ====
Sagasti has served numerous advisory roles over the decades. He was appointed as Vice President of the Board of Directors of the Institute of Technological, Industrial Research and Technical Standards of Peru (ITINTEC) from 1972 to 1977. He was also an advisor to the Minister of Industry, Rear Admiral AP Alberto Jiménez de Lucio, during the revolutionary government of the Armed Forces, during which time as an advisor, he contributed to industrialization and technology matters. From the ministry, Sagasti also advised the National Research Council.

==== International advising ====
From 1978 to 1980, he was Advisor to the Vice President of the International Development Research Centre in Bogotá. Sagasti and two colleagues, Claudio Herzka and Hélan Jaworski, founded Grupo de Análisis para el Desarrollo (GRADE) in 1980. In 1982 he participated as a Fulbright Distinguished Visiting Lecturer at Stanford, Berkeley, UCLA, and Columbia universities.

He was Advisor to the Minister of Foreign Affairs, Allan Wagner Tizón from 1985 to 1987 while also being a member of the Advisory Council of the National Planning Institute.

In 1984, he became a member of the United Nations Commission on Science and Technology for Development and served as president of the commission from 1989 to 1990.

The World Bank promoted structural adjustment to Third World countries in order to establish austerity policies in the 1980s, with such policies being reported by UNICEF as being responsible for "reduced health, nutritional and educational levels for tens of millions of children in Asia, Latin America, and Africa". Sagasti was named Chief of the newly created Strategic Planning Division of the World Bank from 1987 to 1990. He became Senior Advisor to the Policy Evaluation and External Relations Departments at the World Bank in 1990.

==== Return to Peru ====
In 1992, Sagasti resigned from his position at the World Bank and returned to Peru following the 1992 Peruvian constitutional crisis. He formed the Agenda Peru think tank to formulate plans on how to strengthen democratic norms and deter further political violence in Peru. During this period, he also spread awareness and criticism of the authoritarian government of Alberto Fujimori.

He was kidnapped by the Túpac Amaru Revolutionary Movement (MRTA) during the Japanese embassy hostage crisis in 1996. Sagasti was released a few days later and returned to Costa Rica, where he lived with his family. Sagasti, upon being released, brought with him a diary of the events with the signatures of MRTA members.

From 2007 to 2009, he was President of the Board of Directors of the Science and Technology Program (FINCyT) in the Presidency of the Council of Ministers in the administrations of Jorge del Castillo and Yehude Simon Munaro. He was reappointed in the position between December 2011 and March 2013 under the management of Óscar Valdés Dancuart and Juan Jiménez Mayor. From 2009 to 2014, he was principal investigator of FORO Nacional/Internacional, an entity dedicated to promoting debate and consensus on critical issues for national and international development.

In the 2010s, Sagasti was a member of the World Economic Forum's Global Strategic Foresight Community.

== Political career ==
Since the founding of the Purple Party in October 2016, Sagasti helped found and served as the ideological leader of the party. Sagasti was elected into the Congress of the Republic of Peru during the 2020 Peruvian snap parliamentary election, assuming office on 16 March 2020.

During the impeachment process of President Martín Vizcarra, he declined to support the process, demanding "that justice follow its course and that it falls with all severity at the end of his term". President Vizcarra was removed from office by congress on 9 November 2020, a move Sagasti disagreed with. Vizcarra's removal was recognized as a coup by many Peruvians, political analysts and media outlets in the country, resulting with the beginning of the 2020 Peruvian protests. The following day on 10 November, as the President of the Peruvian Congress, Manuel Merino became the new president of Peru following the line of succession established in the nation's constitution, forming a far-right government with the support of Peruvian Navy admirals. Protests intensified against Merino until the deaths of two protesters on 14 November, resulting with the immediate resignations of the majority of Merino's ministers. Five days after assuming the presidency, Merino resigned from the presidency as a result of the backlash.

== Presidency (2020–2021) ==
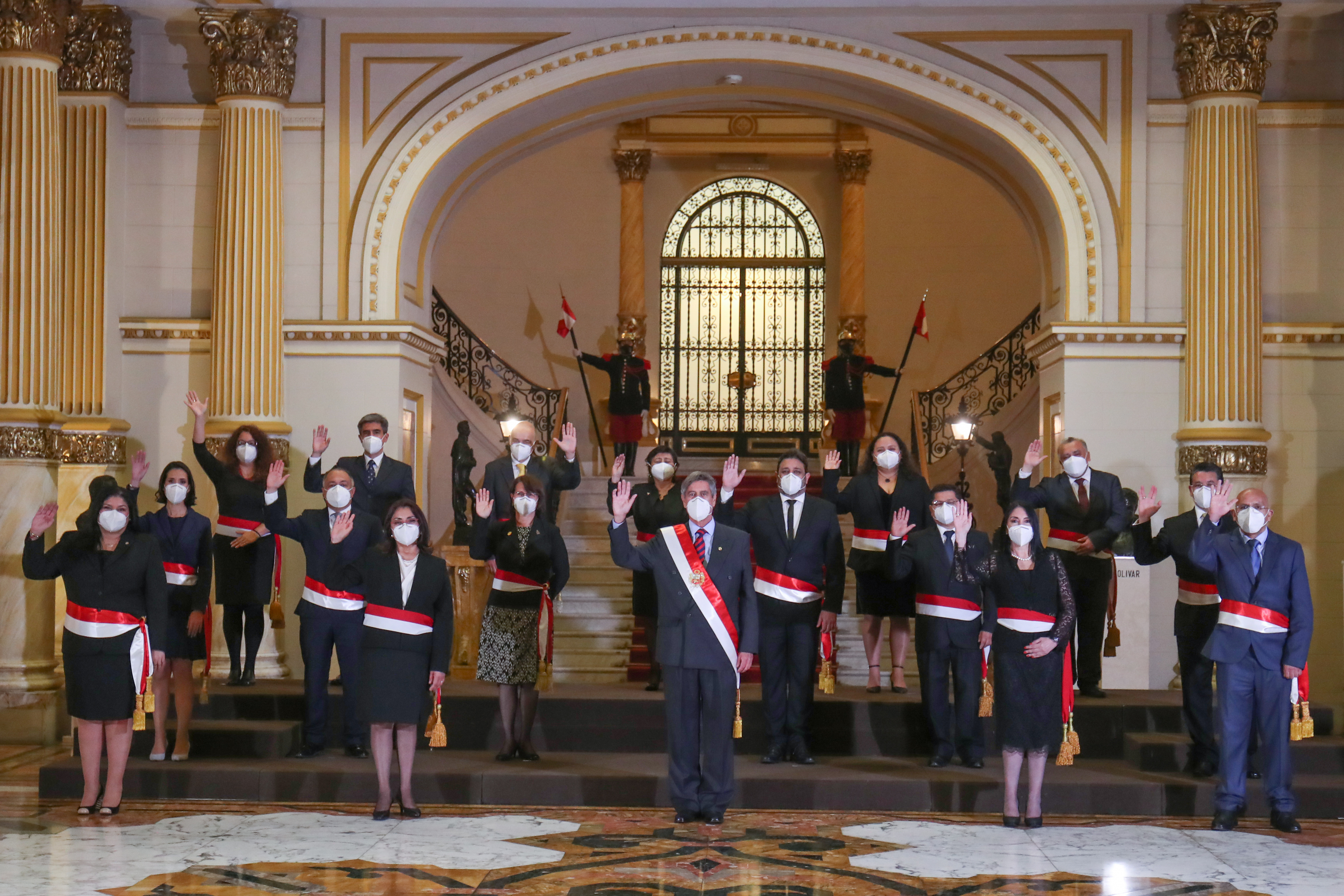
Francisco Sagasti and his Ministerial Cabinet in the Great Hall of the Government Palace, November 2020.

On 16 November 2020, Sagasti was elected by the legislature to be the new President of Congress. Due to vacancies in the position of President and Vice President, he became President of Peru by the line of succession. Upon taking office, he established his four main priorities for his temporary tenure; the management of the COVID-19 pandemic in Peru, combatting corruption within the country, creating a stable economy and the promotion of education to rural areas. Support for Sagasti's presidency was expressed by Chile, the European Union, United Kingdom and the United States.

Like preceding presidents, Americas Quarterly wrote that Sagasti faced difficult relations with congress and that he will need to manage the effects of the two governments before him, including holding those responsible for violently responding to protests accountable for their actions. Sagasti attempted to reform the leadership of the National Police due to their use of violence during protests, removing Commander General Orlando Velasco from leading the National Police. Eighteen additional generals of the National Police resigned or were dismissed, with Interior Minister Rubén Vargas resigning following the change to leadership. Five days later Vargas' successor Cluber Aliaga would also resign in disagreement with Sagasti, defending the use of force by police saying that protesters initiated violence. Sagasti was eligible to seek election for a full term, however the Purple Party nominated Julio Guzmán as their candidate for the 2021 Peruvian general election, with Sagasti on the ticket as Second Vice President.

On November 27, former president Martín Vizcarra considered that Sagasti's replacement in the senior ranks "is not legal" and that the Sagasti government must "respect the institutional framework." On December 1, the former president Francisco Morales Bermúdez with former Defense Ministers Julio Velásquez Giacarini, Roberto Chiabra, Jorge Kisic Wagner, Jorge Moscoso, Walter Martos and Jorge Chávez Cresta, 12 former heads of the Joint Command of the Armed Forces and former general commanders of the Army, Navy and of the Air Force described that the change in the Police was "illegal" and maintained that the decision "is contrary to the legal system, affects the morale of the National Police of Peru and undermines the work that this institution carries out.

On December 2, journalist Nicolás Lúcar released the testimony of a former member of the deactivated Special Intelligence Group (GEIN) who revealed that an alleged half-brother of the Minister of the Interior was a leader of the Shining Path terrorist group; information denied by Minister Vargas. A few hours later, Rubén Vargas Céspedes resigned from the Ministry of the Interior. He was replaced by Cluber Aliaga Lodtmann.

His government set the containment of the COVID-19 Pandemic as axes, for which it managed the purchase of 48 million vaccines from different laboratories; and the holding of the General Elections of 2021, whose schedule has been met as planned. His government coincided with the development of social conflicts such as the agrarian strike in Ica, Piura and La Libertad and Apurímac, which were resolved after the repeal of the so-called "Chlimper Law" that promoted investment in agriculture through meager labor benefits for workers from the field.

== Ideology and positions ==
Regarding his political ideology, Sagasti describes himself as being a centrist, stating "Since college, many leftist movements have tempted me, but I don't think you have to destroy everything to create new things. ... That is what makes me a center person. I am a person with a more reformist conception of things." He has supported the removal of parliamentary immunity from the Congress of the Republic of Peru, stating that such protections are used by criminals to avoid prosecution. When discussing sexual orientation and reproductive rights, Sagasti supports marriage equality and the right of abortion due to pregnancy from rape, though he opposes abortion in ordinary circumstances, stating "abortion is an extremely difficult situation ... An extreme situation of a young woman, a raped girl, who is not capable of being a mother, is not the same as that of an older person who has made her decisions and who has to accept the consequences. Each person has to be able to accept the consequences of their actions." Sagasti also promoted a stricter certification process for universities in Peru, saying "Higher education is not like buying gum".

== Personal life ==
Sagasti married Costa Rican economist Silvia Charpentier Brenes in 1993, who served as a member of the Legislative Assembly of Costa Rica for the National Liberation Party during their marriage and who would later become the director of the Central Bank of Costa Rica. The two had a daughter and divorced in 2005. Sagasti acquired Costa Rican citizenship through his marriage to Charpentier in 2008.

== Awards and recognition ==
- 1980: United Nations Medal of Peace and Paul Hoffman Prize, awarded by the Society for International Development, for "outstanding and significant contributions to national and international development."
- 1999: Resistance Prize awarded by Caretas magazine to ten personalities who stood out during the year, due to their contributions to democratic governance in Peru.
- 2012: Medal of the Governor General of Canada, awarded during the first visit of a Canadian Governor General (the viceregal representative of the Head of State, Queen Elizabeth II) to Peru for "his efforts to strengthen relations between Peru and Canada."
- 2013: Doctor Honoris Causa from the Continental University, Huancayo, Peru.
- 2017: Robert K. Merton Award from the International Network of Analytical Sociology

== Publications ==
=== Books ===
- El reto del Perú en la perspectiva del tercer mundo (coauthored with Jorge Bravo Bresani and Augusto Salazar Bondy). Lima, Moncloa - Campodonónico Editores Asociados, 1972.
- Tecnología, planificación y desarrollo autónomo, Lima, Instituto de Estudios Peruanos, 1977;
- Ciencia, tecnología y desarrollo latinoamericano, Fondo de Cultura Económica, 1981;
- La política científica y tecnológica en América Latina, Colegio de México, 1983;
- Imaginemos un Perú mejor, Lima, Agenda: Perú, 1999;
- Democracia y Buen Gobierno (with Pepi Patrón, Nicolás Lynch and Max Hernández), Lima, Editorial Apoyo, 1999;
- Development Cooperation in a Fractured global Order (with Gonzalo Alcalde), Ottawa, IDRC, 1999;
- A Foresight and Policy Study of the Multilateral Development Banks, Stockholm, Swedish Ministry for Foreign Affairs, 2000;
- La banca multilateral de desarrollo en América Latina, United Nations Publications, 2002;
- Knowledge and Innovation for Development, Londres, Edward Elgar Publishing, 2004;
- The Future of Development Financing: Challenges and Strategic Choices (with Keith Bezanson and Fernando Prada)., Basingstoke, UK, Palgrave-McMillan, 2005;
- Power, Purse and Numbers: A Diagnostic Study of the UN Budget and Finance Process and Structure (with Úrsula Casabonne and Fernando Prada), Stockholm, The Four Nations Initiative, October 2007;
- Ciencia, tecnología, innovación. Políticas para América Latina, Lima, Fondo de Cultura Económica, 2011;
- Un desafío persistente. Políticas de ciencia, tecnología e innovación en el Perú del siglo 21 (coauthored with Lucía Málaga Sabogal). Lima, Fondo de Cultura Económica del Perú/ Fondo Editorial de la Pontificia Universidad Católica del Perú, 2017.
- Imaginemos un Perú mejor… y hagámoslo realidad, Lima, Editorial Planeta, 2021.
- Discursos del Bicentenario, Lima, Editorial Planeta, 2022.
- Gobernar en tiempos de crisis: Política e ideas en el Gobierno de Transición y Emergencia, Perú 2020–2021 (with Lucía Málaga and Giacomo Ugarelli), Lima, Editorial Planeta, 2023.
- Incertidumbre: Cinco ensayos para entender nuestro tiempo, Lima, Editorial Planeta, 2024.

=== As editor ===
- Una Búsqueda Incierta: Ciencia y Tecnología para el Desarrollo, México, Fondo de Cultura Económica, 1996. Editor (con J. Salomón y C. Sachs).
- PERÚ: Agenda y Estrategia para el Siglo 21, Lima, Editorial Apoyo, 2000. Publication coordinator.

=== Press work ===
- He has published more than 150 academic articles.
- He has been a member of the editorial board of the magazines Foresight, El Trimestre Económico, World Development and Technological Forecasting and Social Change.
- He is a contributor to Lima newspapers and magazines, including Caretas, Perú 21, El Comercio, and La República.

== Television ==
- In 1990 he participated in a television series Local Heroes and Global Change, produced by WHGH, in Boston.
- In 1985, he hosted a six-part television series on Pathways to Development, produced by TV Ontario, Canada.
- Between 2005 and 2007, Francisco Sagasti designed, produced and hosted (with Zenaida Solís and Rafo León) a series of nine television episodes in the Abriendo Caminos program on economic, social and political changes in contemporary Peru.

== Discography ==
- CD Mónica interpreta a Sagasti. Lyrics and music by Francisco Sagasti. Interpretation by Mónica Gastelumendi (2016).

== Electoral history ==
Election	Office	List	#	District	Votes			Result	Ref.
Election	Office	List	#	District	Total	%	P.	Result	Ref.
2020	Member of Congress	Purple Party	1	Lima Metropolitan Area	96,422	11.22%	2nd (Note: Presented on an electoral list. The data shown represents the share of the vote the entire party/alliance received in that constituency.)	Elected	

Party political offices
New office	Parliamentary Spokesperson of the Purple Party; 2020	Succeeded by Daniel Olivares
New political party	Purple Party nominee for Second Vice President of Peru; 2021	Most recent
Political offices
Preceded by Manuel Merino	President of Congress; 2020–2021	Succeeded by Maricarmen Alva
Preceded by Manuel Merino	President of Peru; 2020–2021	Succeeded by Pedro Castillo
