= Édgar Alarcón =

Peruvian politician (1961–2024)

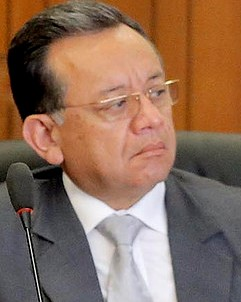
- Alarcón in 2013

Member of Congress
- In office 16 March 2020 – 16 April 2021
- Constituency: Arequipa

Comptroller General of the Republic of Peru
- In office 9 June 2016 – 4 July 2017
- Preceded by: Fuad Elías Khoury Zarzar
- Succeeded by: Nelson Shack

Personal details
- Born: Édgar Arnold Alarcón Tejada; 9 May 1961 Arequipa, Peru
- Died: 14 May 2024 (aged 63) Ayacucho, Peru
- Party: Union for Peru
- Education: National University of Saint Augustine
- Website: Official website

Édgar Arnold Alarcón Tejada (9 May 1961 – 14 May 2024) was a Peruvian accountant and politician who served as Comptroller General of the Republic of Peru from 9 June 2016 to 4 July 2017. He was a Congressman representing Arequipa from 16 March 2020 until he was removed from office in April 2021. Alarcón belonged to the Union for Peru.

== Early life and education ==
Son of Diego Alarcón Carpio and Nancy Tejada Escobedo, he studied at the San Martín de Socabaya (Arequipa) and Manuel Muñoz Najar Schools, in the same town. Later, he would study accounting at the National University of Saint Augustine, obtaining a bachelor's degree and later a Professional Degree in the same university house, although it was confirmed that his degree was fraudulent.

== Career ==
On 9 June 2016, he was appointed Comptroller General of the Republic, despite this he was removed from his position on 4 July 2017.

On 9 October 2019, Alarcón was presented as the main Governor Advisor in the Regional Government of Arequipa headed by Élmer Cáceres Llica. On 6 November, he resigned from that position, denouncing acts of corruption within the Regional Entity.

== Political career ==
During the 2020 Peruvian parliamentary election, he was elected a congressman by the Union for Peru on behalf of Arequipa, an office which he took up on 16 March of the same year. Likewise, on 21 April, he was elected president of the Congressional Oversight Commission within the framework of the state of emergency due to the COVID-19 pandemic in Peru.

Alarcón was in favor of Vizcarra's vacancy during the two processes, the second of which ended up removing the former president from power. The congressman supported the motion being one of the 105 parliamentarians who voted in favor of the vacancy of President Martín Vizcarra.

In April 2021, he was suspended from his duties as a Congressman of the Republic for the duration of the criminal proceedings against him for alleged acts of corruption when he was Comptroller General of the Republic.

== Death ==
Alarcón died on 14 May 2024, at the age of 63, after a bus crashed in Ayacucho. Twelve other people also died in the crash, and fourteen were injured.

== Controversies ==
Alarcón was questioned for having named ex-congressman Juan José Díaz Dios as parliamentary coordinator of the Comptroller's Office.

When an alleged irregular purchase of computers by the Board of Directors of Congress was revealed, Alarcón ruled out any responsibility of Luz Salgado and José Cevasco, the latter responsible for the disputed acquisition, and was criticized for the phrase: "So much noise for five Millions!".

Alarcón was also accused of having recorded the conversations he had with some ministers of the ministerial cabinet such as Fernando Zavala (Prime Minister), Alfredo Thorne (former Minister of Economy) and Martín Vizcarra (former Minister of Transport).

On 3 July 2017, the Permanent Commission of the Congress of the Republic through Legislative Resolution No. 015-2016-2017-CR, in its first article, it was established: "The removal of Mr. Édgar Arnold Alarcón Tejada from the position of Comptroller General of the Republic, for which he was designated by Legislative Resolution No. 003-2015-2016 dated 9 June 2016... "and the vacancy of the Comptroller position was declared.
