= All for Peru =

Political party in Peru

All for Peru Todos por el Perú
- Abbreviation: TPP
- President: Aureo Zegarra
- Secretary-General: Raquel Lozada Valentín
- Spokesperson: Jean Carlos Zegarra Roldán
- Founded: February 23, 2002
- Dissolved: September 7, 2021
- Headquarters: Lima, Peru
- Membership (2020): 19,283
- Ideology: Liberalism; Centrism
- Political position: Centre to centre-right

All for Peru (Spanish: Todos por el Perú, TPP), previously named National Coordinator of Independents (Spanish: Coordinadora Nacional de Independientes, CNI) was a centrist Peruvian political party.

Founded as a party aimed at gathering independent politicians, it participated in the 2006 and 2011 general elections within large coalitions, and but never attained representation in the Peruvian Congress. The party tried running in subsequent elections alone, but was disqualified in the 2016 election, and not admitted to participate in the 2021 election.

The party lost its registration at the National Jury of Elections for not participating in the 2021 election, effectively dissolving the party since no attempt has been made to reregister.

== History ==
=== Founding ===
The party was founded by independent individuals who supported Lourdes Flores during her campaign for the 2001 Peruvian presidential election. Various independent movements gathered together on 23 February 2002 to form the National Coordinator of Independents.

=== Separation ===
In 2004 many factions of the National Coordinator of Independents separated, leaving the party weak at national level.

=== Rename (2009) ===
The National Coordinator of Independents changed its name to All for Peru in 2009.

=== Elections ===
All for Peru, then the National Coordinator of Independents, joined the Center Front alliance of Valentín Paniagua during the 2006 general election. The campaign saw little success, with none of the party's candidates being elected into Congress.

For the 2016 general election, the party presented Julio Guzmán as their presidential candidate. However, the National Elections Jury barred him from the election after it found irregularities in the party's internal processes. Guzmán would later go on to found the Purple Party.

In early 2020 Guzman's disqualification was then proven to be a result of corruption by the Cuellos Blancos del Puerto, an illegal Peruvian drug-trafficking network inside the National Jury of Elections. More than 1,000 individuals participated in establishing guidelines for the political movement.

Following Fernando Cillóniz ticket rejection for the 2021 general election, the party did not participate in said election, thus lost its registration at the National Jury of Elections. The party was officially dissolved on 7 September 2021.

== Electoral history ==
=== Presidential election ===
Year	Candidate	Party / Coalition	Votes	Percentage	Outcome
2006	Valentín Paniagua	Center Front AP-PDSP-TPP	706 156	5.75	5th
2011	Luis Castañeda	National Solidarity Alliance PSN-C90-TPP-SU-UPP	1 440 143	9.83	5th
2016	Julio Guzmán	All for Peru	Disqualified	N/A	N/A
2021	Fernando Cillóniz	All for Peru	Not admitted	N/A	N/A

=== Elections to the Congress of the Republic ===
Year	Votes	%	Seats	▲/▼	Position
2006	760 245	7.1% as part of Center Front. None from All for Peru	5 / 120	Steady	N/A
2011	1 311 766	10.2% as part of National Solidarity Alliance. None from All for Peru	9 / 130	Steady	N/A
2016	List withdrawn	N/A	N/A	Steady	N/A

=== Regional and municipal elections ===
Year	Regional Governors	Provincial Mayors	District Mayors
Year	Outcome	Outcome	Outcome
2006	0 / 25	1 / 195	3 / 1,637
2010	0 / 25	0 / 195	6 / 1,639
2018	0 / 25	0 / 196	7 / 1,678
