= Manuel Merino =

President of Peru in 2020

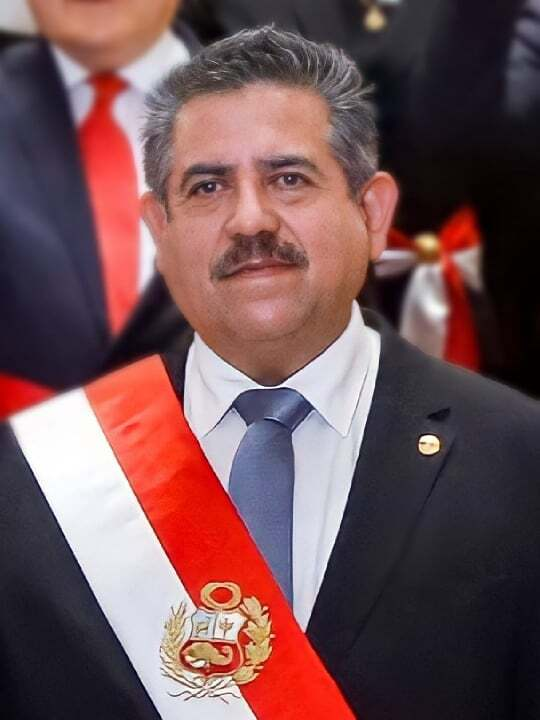
- Merino in 2020

President of Peru
- In office 10 November 2020 – 15 November 2020
- Prime Minister: Ántero Flores Aráoz
- Vice President: First Vice President; Vacant; Second Vice President; Vacant
- Preceded by: Martín Vizcarra
- Succeeded by: Francisco Sagasti

President of Congress
- In office 16 March 2020 – 10 November 2020 (Note: On Leave: 10 November 2020 – 15 November 2020; Ascended into the presidency of Peru on 10 November 2020 as the President of Congress. His roles in the Congress of the Republic was immediately suspended as soon as he took the presidency.)
- Vice President: 1st Vice President; Luis Valdez Farías; 2nd Vice President; Guillermo Aliaga; 3rd Vice President; María Teresa Cabrera
- Preceded by: Pedro Olaechea
- Succeeded by: Luis Valdez Farías (a.i.)

First Vice President of Congress
- In office 26 July 2011 – 26 July 2012
- President: Daniel Abugattás
- Preceded by: Alejandro Aguinaga
- Succeeded by: Marco Falconí

Member of Congress
- In office 16 March 2020 – 26 July 2021 (Note: Suspended from 10 to 15 November when he was serving as the President of Peru)
- Constituency: Tumbes
- In office 25 July 2011 – 26 July 2016
- Constituency: Tumbes
- In office 26 July 2001 – 26 July 2006
- Constituency: Tumbes

Personal details
- Born: Manuel Arturo Merino de Lama; 20 August 1961 (age 65) Tumbes, Peru
- Party: Popular Action
- Spouse: Mary Peña (m. 1985)
- Children: 3
- Education: National University of Tumbes
- Occupation: Politician; agronomist

Manuel Arturo Merino de Lama (born 20 August 1961) is a Peruvian politician who briefly served as President of Peru for five days between 10 and 15 November 2020. He also served as the President of Congress from 16 March 2020 to 15 November 2020. He was a Member of Congress (AP) representing the Tumbes constituency for the 2001–2006, 2011–2016, and 2020–2021 terms.

On 9 November 2020, the Congress impeached and removed President Martín Vizcarra from office on the grounds of "moral incapacity", a vague term dating back to the 19th century, relating to "mental incapacity", with Vizcarra's removal resulting in the beginning of the 2020 Peruvian protests. The following day, as the President of the Peruvian Congress, Merino became the new president of Peru following the line of succession established in the nation's constitution. Five days after taking office, he resigned as president of Congress and subsequently as president of Peru after two deaths in the protests. Polls showed that 94% of Peruvians had disapproved of Merino's accession to the presidency. He was succeeded by Francisco Sagasti.

== Early life and education ==
Manuel Arturo Merino de Lama was born on 20 August 1961 in the northern city of Tumbes. He is the son of Pedro Merino Hidalgo and Elba de Lama Barreto. In 1985, he married Mary Jacqueline Peña Carruitero, an early childhood teacher. The couple have three children, Elba Jacqueline, Sandra Lisbeth and María Teresa.

Merino completed his elementary education at the Santa María de la Frontera School in 1973, and he finished his secondary education at the "Inmaculada Concepción" Educational Center in 1978, both in Tumbes.

In 1979, he enrolled at the National University of Piura (later the National University of Tumbes) to study agronomics. He subsequently dropped out and did not complete his undergraduate studies. That same year, Merino registered with the center-right political party Popular Action. From Tumbes, he integrated into the Youth Command, later becoming an active member of the party.

== Business career ==
In 1983, Merino was initially an agricultural producer and merchant, at the same time he dedicating himself to raising cattle, serving as a member of the Tumbes Livestock Fund (FONGAN), president of Marketing of the Association of Banana Producers, president of the Association of Traders of Bananas and Fruits in General, member of the Tumbes Agriculture Defense Committee, representative of the Agrarian Producers of Tumbes, president of the Electoral Committee of the Irrigation Commission of the Left Bank of the Tumbes River, and president of the Permanent Commission of the Agrarian Debt of Tumbes.

In December 2000, Merino coordinated directly with the different agrarian organizations of the department, to obtain the cancellation of the debts contracted with the State and the refinancing of the same with the private financial entities.

== Political career ==
=== Early political career ===
In 1979, he enrolled at the National University of Piura (later the National University of Tumbes) to study agronomics. He subsequently dropped out and did not complete his undergraduate studies. That same year, Merino registered with the center-right political party Popular Action. From Tumbes, he integrated into the Youth Command, later becoming an active member of the party.

=== Congress of the Republic of Peru ===
In 2000, he presided over the National Unity Front made up of political parties and movements. He was subsequently chosen by the Popular Action party to run for a seat in Congress in the 2001 general election. Merino was elected to Congress with the highest vote count in Tumbes for the 2001–2006 term. At the 2006 general election, Merino failed to attain reelection, as the Center Front coalition only obtained five seats nationally, mostly from Lima.

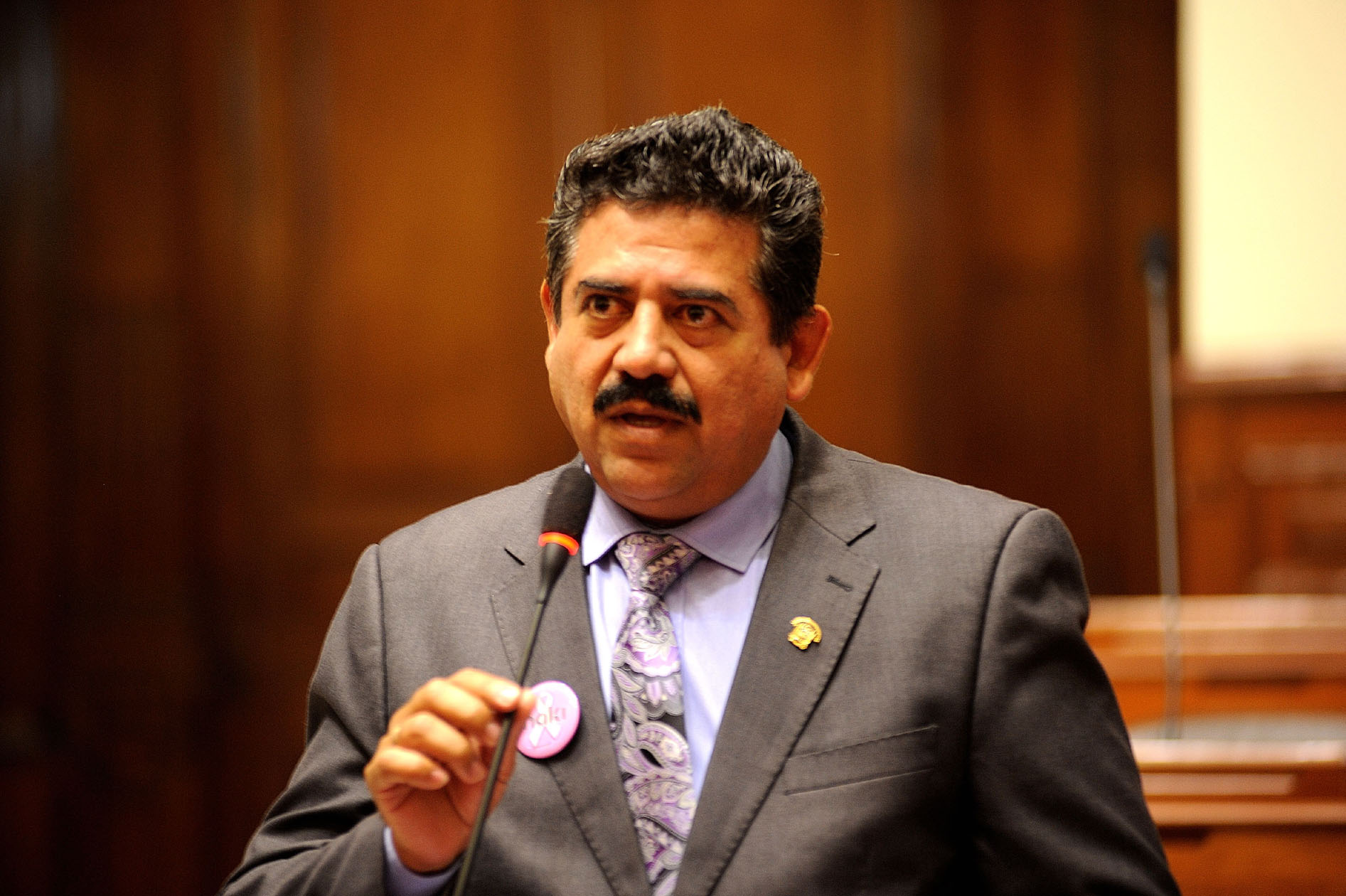
Merino in 2012.

In the following years, Merino took an active role in the National Executive Committee of Popular Action, which propelled him to once again run for the Congress in the 2011 general election. As part of the Possible Peru Electoral Alliance, which united Popular Action, We Are Peru, and Possible Peru, he was elected for the Tumbes constituency for the 2011–2016 term.

From 2011 to 2012, Merino served as First Vice President of the Congress, during Daniel Abugattás congressional presidency. Likewise, from 2012 to 2013, he chaired the Housing Committee. He was also an alternate spokesperson for the Popular Action-Broad Front parliamentary caucus, and Vice President of the Amazon Congressional Caucus, from 2011 to 2013. In the 2016 general election, Merino again failed to attain reelection, as the Popular Action only obtained five seats nationally, mostly from Lima.

In March 2020, an investigation into potential nepotism was initiated against Merino. While a member of congress between 2011 and 2016, his mother and two brothers were contracted by the Peruvian government and paid $55,000 for services, which is not permitted due to his membership in congress. His brother was granted another government contract one month before Merino took office in March 2020. Merino denied any allegations of nepotism.

=== President of Congress ===
In the 2020 election, Merino was elected to Congress for a third time, once again representing Tumbes to complete the 2016-2021 parliamentary term in the aftermath of the 2019 Peruvian constitutional crisis. Due to being the most experienced congressman of the first parliamentary majority caucus (AP), he was elected President of Congress on 16 March 2020, with 93 votes in favor against Rocío Silva-Santisteban (FA), who only obtained 14 votes.

==== First impeachment process against Martín Vizcarra ====
On 11 September 2020, Congress initiated impeachment proceedings against President Martín Vizcarra, for alleged "permanent moral incapacity". The determining factor for the motion to be approved was that it reach the number of necessary votes (26), which was achieved hours later.

Merino faced criticism regarding how he hastily pushed for impeachment proceedings against Vizcarra. If Vizcarra were to be removed from office, Merino would assume the presidential office given his position in congress and due to the absence of vice presidents for Vizcarra.^{[A]} Renowned reporter Gustavo Gorriti reported on 12 September that Merino had contacted the Commanding General of the Peruvian Navy, Fernando Cerdán, notifying him that he was going to attempt to impeach Vizcarra and was seeking to assume the presidency. Minister of Defense Jorge Chávez confirmed that Merino had tried to establish support with the military. Subsequent reports were later released that Merino had contacted officials throughout the government while preparing to create a transitional cabinet and that Merino had tried to communicate with the Chief of the Joint Command of the Peruvian Armed Forces, César Astudillo Salcedo, and Navy Commander, Fernando Cerdán, in order to "give them peace of mind". Following the release of these reports, support for impeaching Vizcarra decreased among members of congress.

President Vizcarra was summoned – upon approval of the motion – to exercise his right of defense. On 18 September, after a long session, Congress held the impeachment vote after hearing the president and his legal counsel, which was rejected with 78 votes against, 32 in favor and 15 abstentions.

==== Second impeachment process against Martín Vizcarra ====
On 20 October 2020, the Union for Peru parliamentary caucus – citing as strong evidence against Vizcarra the media revelations on his tenure as Governor of Moquegua – issued a second impeachment motion, which was supported by Broad Front, Podemos Perú, two congressmen from Popular Action and an independent. In order to gain more evidence against the President, Merino and the congressional leadership agreed on delaying the debate on the motion until 2 November. The motion was subsequently approved, and Vizcarra was summoned once again to exercise his defense with the assistance of his legal counsel.

On 9 November 2020, following Vizcarra's appearance before Congress, Merino initiated the final debate in order to proceed to voting on the impeachment at night. The impeachment vote reached a total of 105 votes in favor, 19 against, and 2 abstentions, thus effectively removing Vizcarra from office.

Due to the accepted resignation of Mercedes Aráoz as Second Vice President six months before, the constitutional succession allowed Merino to ascend to the presidency of Peru in his position of President of Congress. The decision was widely dismissed by the media and the population, sparking the beginning of widespread protests throughout Peru in sign of disapproval. Vizcarra ultimately accepted his removal from office, and departed from the Government Palace on the same night.

== Presidency (2020) ==
- Presidency of Manuel Merino; 10 November 2020 – 15 November 2020
- Party: Popular Action
- Seat: Government Palace
- Standard of the President

Merino was inaugurated at 10:42 a.m. (Peru Time) on 10 November 2020, in the midst of protests across the country against his ascension to the presidency.

As the principal theme of his inaugural speech, Merino spoke about the political and health crisis, national unity, and the defense of the Constitution. Referring to the process, he stated that the votes that vacated Vizcarra "were not bought". He announced the formation of a cabinet of consensus and national unity. He affirmed that the agreed schedule for the 2021 general elections would be respected and that resources would be provided to the electoral bodies.

In his speech, he stated that his political inspirations were based on former presidents Fernando Belaúnde Terry and Valentín Paniagua Corazao, asserting that nobody could accuse them of corruption.

The following day, under the pressure of forming a new government, he named Ántero Flores Aráoz, a conservative politician and former Minister of Defense under former President Alan García, as Prime Minister.

The Secretary General of the Organization of American States, Luis Almagro, expressed concern regarding the political crisis in Peru. Almagro expressed his concern about the issue and "reiterates that it is the responsibility of the Constitutional Court of Peru to rule on the legality and legitimacy of the institutional decisions adopted." The governments of Chile, Uruguay and Paraguay recognized Merino's government; likewise, the United States welcomed the ratification of the call for general elections signed by Manuel Merino and Ántero Flores-Aráoz. The Asia-Pacific Economic Cooperation (APEC), which brings together 21 countries, invited Merino to participate in the annual Meeting of Heads of State.

His assumption of the presidency, due to the vacancy against Martín Vizcarra, was questioned by various sectors of the population.

On November 13, Merino was invited to participate in the annual meeting of the Asia-Pacific Economic Cooperation Forum.

Merino expressed support for the scheduled elections in April 2021, called for health and economic recovery from the COVID-19 pandemic in Peru, and promoted law and order within the country. Protests continued, however, with heavy police response to demonstrations on 14 November resulting in the deaths of protesters and the subsequent resignation of the majority of Merino's ministers.

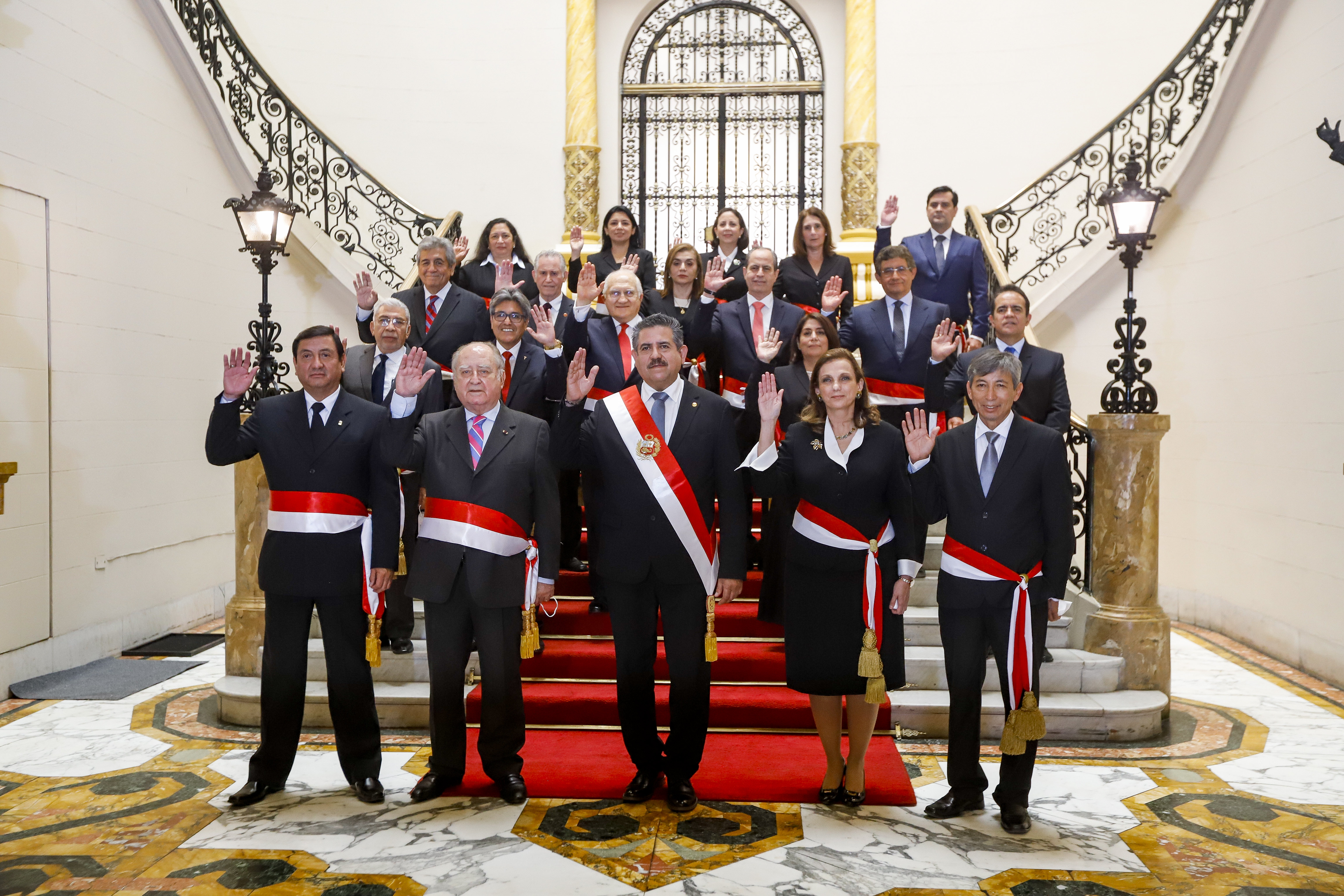
Flores-Aráoz Cabinet.

On 13 November, health minister Abel Salinas Rivas announced the purchase of molecular tests for the fight against the COVID-19 pandemic.

On 15 November, Merino and Ántero Flores-Aráoz signed the law authorizing the withdrawal of AFP funds for those who had stopped contributing for 12 months, as part of the social measures to address the family economic situation caused by the COVID-19 pandemic.

=== Resignation ===
On 14 November 2020, the Second National March erupted against the government of Manuel Merino, with demonstrations and protests taking place in the country's principal cities. During the night, protesters Inti Sotelo and Brian Pintado were killed in central Lima. Around midnight, Prime Minister Flores-Aráoz neither confirmed nor denied that resignations existed within his cabinet, since he had been unable to communicate with them through WhatsApp.

On 15 November 2020, Merino stepped down as president, citing that he acted within the law when he was sworn into office the previous Tuesday and that he would "do everything in my power to guarantee a constitutional succession."

The Constitutional Court of Peru scheduled for Wednesday, November 18, the public hearing on the competence claim filed by the Executive Power on September 14 for the first presidential vacancy process, in which the votes to remove Martín Vizcarra were not obtained.

The succeeding government of Francisco Sagasti announced following Merino's resignation that the attorney general would investigate if he was responsible for possible human rights violations.

On November 20, 2020, the Constitutional Court published its ruling in which it declared the jurisdictional claim inadmissible because it considered that there was a subtraction of the matter and therefore did not make any pronouncement on the merits, which generated academic questions. Later, after Manuel Merino affirmed in a tweet that this decision of the Constitutional Court ratified the constitutionality of his promotion to the presidency, the magistrate of the Constitutional Court, Eloy Espinosa-Saldaña, stated that this is not correct because the Constitutional Court did not have any pronouncement and that cannot be understood as ratification as Merino affirmed. However, magistrates such as Ernesto Blume, José Luis Sardón and Augusto Ferrero Costa considered in various interviews that Martín Vizcarra's vacancy was in line with the Political Constitution of Peru.

=== Aftermath ===
In July 2022, the Permanent Commission of the Congress of the Republic voted to shield Merino from investigations related to the two deaths and 79 injuries that occurred during protests against his government.

== Presidential approval ==
In September 2020, while Merino was President of Congress, Ipsos polls found that 72% of Peruvians in urban areas disapproved of Merino while 79% believed that Vizcarra should finish his term.

In November 2020, the month when Merino became president, Ipsos polls showed that 88% percent of Peruvians disapproved of Vizcarra's removal, while only 11% approved. 94% of Peruvians disapproved of Merino's presidency.

Pollster/Media outlet	Date	Sample	Manuel Merino (President of the Republic)			
Pollster/Media outlet	Date	Sample	Appr.	Disappr.	DK/NO	Diff.
Ipsos Perú/El Comercio	16 Nov 2020	1207	5	94	1	−91

== Notes ==
- A Peru has two Vice Presidents, a First and Second Vice President. The most recent holders of the office of First and Second Vice President were Vizcarra and Mercedes Aráoz, respectively, who were elected in the 2016 election. Vizcarra left the office of First Vice President vacant after he succeeded Kuzcynski as president, leaving Aráoz as the sole Vice President, while Aráoz resigned as Second Vice President on 1 October 2019 after the Congress of Peru named Aráoz acting president the day before after having declared Vizcarra temporarily unfit for office, despite Congress having itself been dissolved earlier that day by President Vizcarra, resulting in a constitutional crisis. However, her resignation was not official until it was accepted on 7 May 2020 by the new Congress of Peru sworn on 16 March 2020, since in Peru the resignation of the vice president has to be accepted by Congress and that institution was not celebrating meetings given its dissolution.

Political offices
Preceded by Martín Vizcarra	President of Peru; 2020	Succeeded by Francisco Sagasti
