= Grupo Terna =

Plainclothes police unit in Peru

Urban Operational Tactical Intelligence Unit
- Unidad de Inteligencia Táctica Operativa Urbana

Agency overview
- Formed: May 14, 2012
- Superseding agency: Special Operations Division
- Jurisdiction: Peru
- Headquarters: Lima
- Employees: 10,000 (2014)

The Urban Operational Tactical Intelligence Unit (Spanish: Unidad de Inteligencia Táctica Operativa Urbana), better known as the Grupo Terna, is a specialised unit of the Special Operations Division (better known as the "Green Squadron") of the National Police of Peru. It consists of police officers dressed in plain clothes, who blend in with criminal areas and intervene against people who commit flagrant crimes, using operational tactical intelligence.

Its name comes from its method of operations, which usually involves groups of three.

== History ==
On May 14, 2012, the unit was created, as part of the "Special Operations and Youth at Risk Division – Green Squadron" (Spanish: División de Operaciones Especiales y Jóvenes en Riesgo – Escuadrón Verde), as the new strategy to combat new crime modalities. The division itself was created on August 16, 2003.

According to an official statement from the Ministry of the Interior, the number of agents in Lima increased from 250 to 2,000, in order to effectively confront common crime, one of the main problems faced by several districts of the city.

The group was relevant in attending anti-drug operations. In 2024 they made international headlines after an officer dressed up as a teddy bear detained a suspect suspected of drug trafficking. The teddy bear figure became a symbolic element for those who provide information to people wanted by the police.

== See also ==
- National Police of Peru
