= María Teresa Cabrera =

Peruvian politician

María Teresa Cabrera Vega is a Peruvian politician. She is a Congresswoman representing Lima for the 2020–2021 term, and belongs to the Podemos Perú party.

Cabrera served as Third Vice President of Congress from 16 March 2020 till her resignation 15 November 2020 alongside the congressional leadership.
