= Julio Guzmán =

Peruvian economist and politician

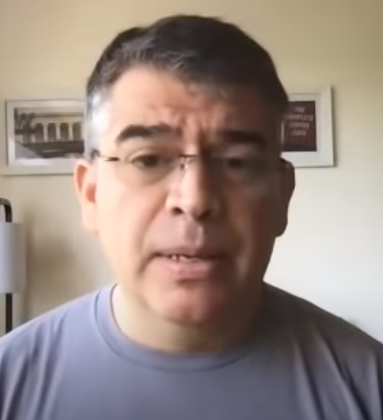

President of the Purple Party
- In office 18 November 2017 – 30 December 2021
- Preceded by: Office established
- Succeeded by: Luis Durán Rojo

Secretary General of the Office of the Prime Minister of Peru
- In office 2 August 2012 – 26 February 2013
- President: Ollanta Humala
- Prime Minister: Juan Jiménez
- Preceded by: María Elena Juscamaita
- Succeeded by: Manuel Ángel Clausen Olivares

Deputy Minister of Micro and Small Business and Industry
- In office 5 August 2011 – 20 December 2011
- President: Ollanta Humala
- Prime Minister: Salomon Lerner; Oscar Valdés
- Minister: Kurt Burneo; José Antonio Urquizo
- Preceded by: Hugo Rodríguez Espinoza
- Succeeded by: Gladys Triveño

Personal details
- Born: Julio Armando Guzmán Cáceres; 31 July 1970 (age 56) Lima, Peru
- Party: Purple Party (2017–present)
- Other political affiliations: All for Peru (2015–2017)
- Spouses: Ximena Cáceres del Busto (m. 1999; div. 2009) Michelle Ertischek (m. 2011)
- Children: 4
- Education: Pontifical Catholic University of Peru (BA); Georgetown University (MPP); University of Maryland (PhD)

Julio Armando Guzmán Cáceres (born 31 July 1970) is a Peruvian economist, politician, and leader of the Purple Party who ran for President in the 2021 general elections getting just over 2% of valid votes. He was formerly the leader of the All for Peru political party, running for president for the party in the 2016 general elections, but was disqualified, due to the irregularities of the nomination process.

== Early life and education ==
Julio Armando Guzman Caceres was born on July 31, 1970, in Lima. He is the second youngest of 12 children. His father, an architect by profession, came to Lima from the rural province of Anta in the Cusco Region. His mother is from Celendin in the Cajamarca Region.

Guzman attended Colegio Sagrados Corazones Recoleta high school in Lima. Guzman joined the Pontifical Catholic University of Peru, where he studied economics and started a career teaching mathematics. Then he studied for a Master's in Public Policy at Georgetown University and continued graduate studies at the University of Oxford before completing his PhD in Public Policy from the University of Maryland.

== Professional career ==
He has been an adjunct professor at the School of Public Policy at Georgetown University in Washington, D.C., and the nearby campus of the University of Maryland..

== Political career ==
Guzmán worked for 10 years at the Inter-American Development Bank as an economist in integration and trade. He left to work as a deputy minister in Peru's Ministry of Labor in the government of Ollanta Humala. In 2012, he was appointed secretary general of Peru's Cabinet under Prime Minister Juan Jiménez Mayor. Guzmán resigned from the government in February 2013.

Later he worked as a representative of the international firm Deloitte in Peru.

=== 2016 presidential campaign ===
Guzman announced he was running for president of Peru in July 2015. He rose in the polls throughout the final months of 2015 until registering 5% of the vote in January. By February 2016, he had risen to 20% of the vote, second to leading candidate Keiko Fujimori, daughter of imprisoned former President Alberto Fujimori. During the campaign in February 2016, two militants from the Spanish left-wing Podemos party accused Julio Guzmán of having copied their presidential campaign.

==== Disqualification ====
In February 2016, according to a statement from the National Elections Jury, the requests for modification of the electronic registration form of the National Executive Committee (CEN) and the Electoral Tribunal of the political group Todos por el Perú were declared inadmissible. On February 19, the JEE (Special Electoral Jury) ruled inadmissible the candidacy of Julio Guzmán for the 2016 Presidential Elections. However, on February 24, the Lima Center 1 Special Electoral Jury approved the candidacy, after having corrected the observations made and comply with the requirements set forth in the regulations of the Electoral Law.

In March 2016, the National Elections Jury barred him from the election after it found irregularities in the party's internal processes. A later investigation finalized in 2020 found that Guzman's disqualification was a result of corruption by the Cuellos Blancos del Puerto, a Peruvian drug-trafficking network inside the National Jury of Elections. Guzmán has later referred to his disqualification as "the worst moment of his life".

=== 2021 presidential campaign ===
In 2016, Guzman separated from All for Peru and founded the Purple Party. Guzman registered the party in Peru seeking to participate in the 2021 presidential elections. Following allegations surrounding Peruvian officials being involved in the Odebrecht scandal, Guzman stated that the "Odebrecht case is the meteor that will extinguish the dinosaurs" of Peru's political realm.

== Personal life ==
In 1999, Guzmán married Ximena Caceres del Busto, with whom he has a son and a daughter. They got divorced in 2009. In 2011, he married American citizen Michelle Ertischek, with whom he has two daughters.

In January 2020, a compromising video of Guzman was released in which he was at a romantic lunch with a provincial Purple Party leader. A fire broke out, caused by candles that overheated a television. Guzmán was questioned for having escaped the blaze while leaving his companion behind. Shortly afterwards, he explained that "there was no infidelity and that he owed the explanations to his wife because it was a matter of a private nature" and apologized for the incident.

== Controversies ==
=== Odebrecht scandal ===
In August 2020, the Lava Jato Special Team of the Public Ministry, which is investigating the Odebrecht case in Peru, opened an investigation into Guzmán for money laundering. The proceedings will be carried out because the candidate would have received 400 thousand dollars as a contribution from the Odebrecht company for the 2016 campaign. Guzmán responded, "it is materially impossible that I have received money from Odebrecht" and described as "absurd" the complaint "of a third party who has the hobby of reporting everyone [...] on the basis of an interview that a ex-congressman gave on a local radio”.

== Electoral history ==
=== Executive ===
Election	Office	List	Votes			Result	Ref.
Election	Office	List	Total	%	P.	Result	Ref.
2021	President of Peru	Purple Party	325,608	2.26%	10th	Not elected	
