= Presidency of Francisco Sagasti =

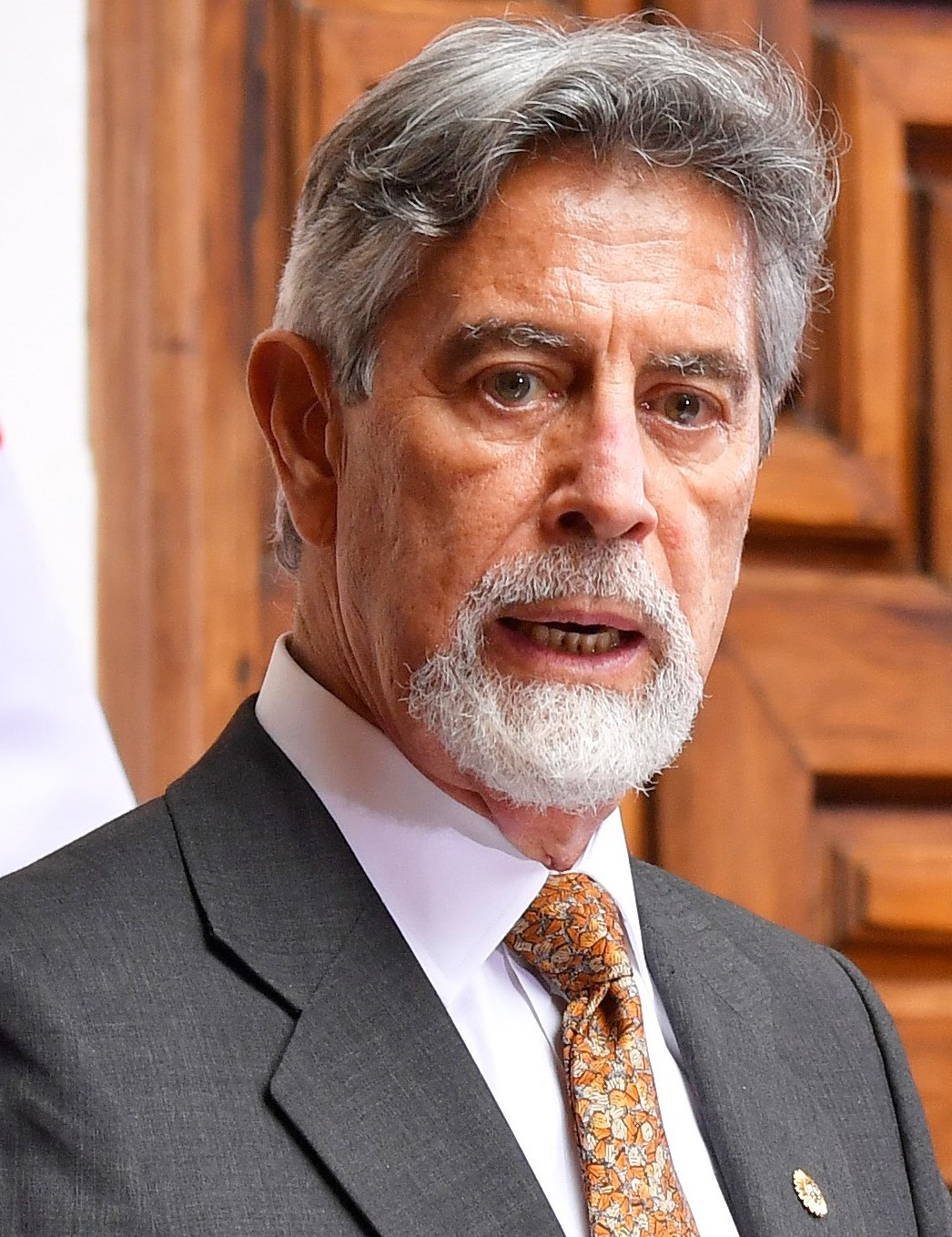
- Presidency of Francisco Sagasti; 17 November 2020 – 28 July 2021
- Cabinet: See list
- Party: Purple Party
- Election: 2020
- Seat: Government Palace

The presidency of Francisco Sagasti in Peru started on 17 November 2020 in the midst of a constitutional crisis which resulted in multiple presidential successions to complete the remaining 2020–2021 presidential term. The administration has been deemed as a "Transitional government" and an "Emergency government" in light of the COVID-19 pandemic, an economic recession, and a political crisis which dominated Peruvian life.

== Ascension to the presidency ==
On 15 November 2020, following the resignation of interim president Manuel Merino and the executive board of Congress, the legislative body elected a new President of Congress that through presidential succession, would assume the role of President. The first list of candidates was headed by Rocio Silva-Santisteban of Frente Amplio, who did not reach the vote threshold to become President of Congress. The second list of candidates had congressmen from Partido Morado, Frente Amplio, Accion Popular, and Somos Peru, which was approved.

Second round
Office	Legislator	Party
President	Francisco Rafael Sagasti Hochhausler	Partido Morado
First Vice President	Mirtha Esther Vásquez Chuquilín	Frente Amplio
Second Vice President	Luis Andrés Roel Alva	Acción Popular
Third Vice President	Matilde Fernández Flores	Somos Perú

President	Date	Vote	Total
Francisco Sagasti	16 November 2020; Required majority: Simple	Yes	97 / 130
Francisco Sagasti	16 November 2020; Required majority: Simple	No	26 / 130
Francisco Sagasti	16 November 2020; Required majority: Simple	Abs.	0 / 130
Francisco Sagasti	16 November 2020; Required majority: Simple	Aus.	7 / 130

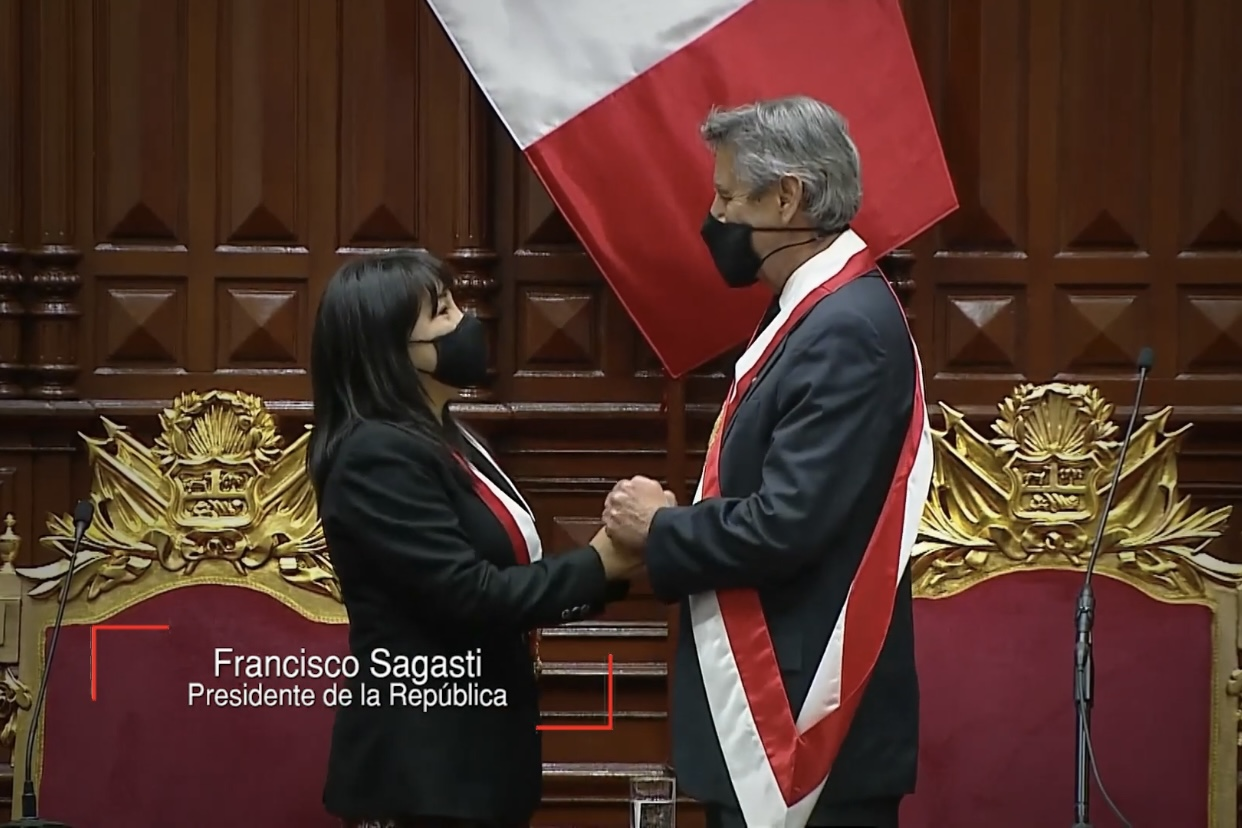
Mirtha Vásquez, President of Congress, swears in Francisco Sagasti.

== Presidency ==
=== National Police ===
Five days after the inauguration, Sagasti announced major changes in the executive board of the National Police and announced that César Cervantes would be appointed as the National General.

=== Bermúdez Cabinet ===
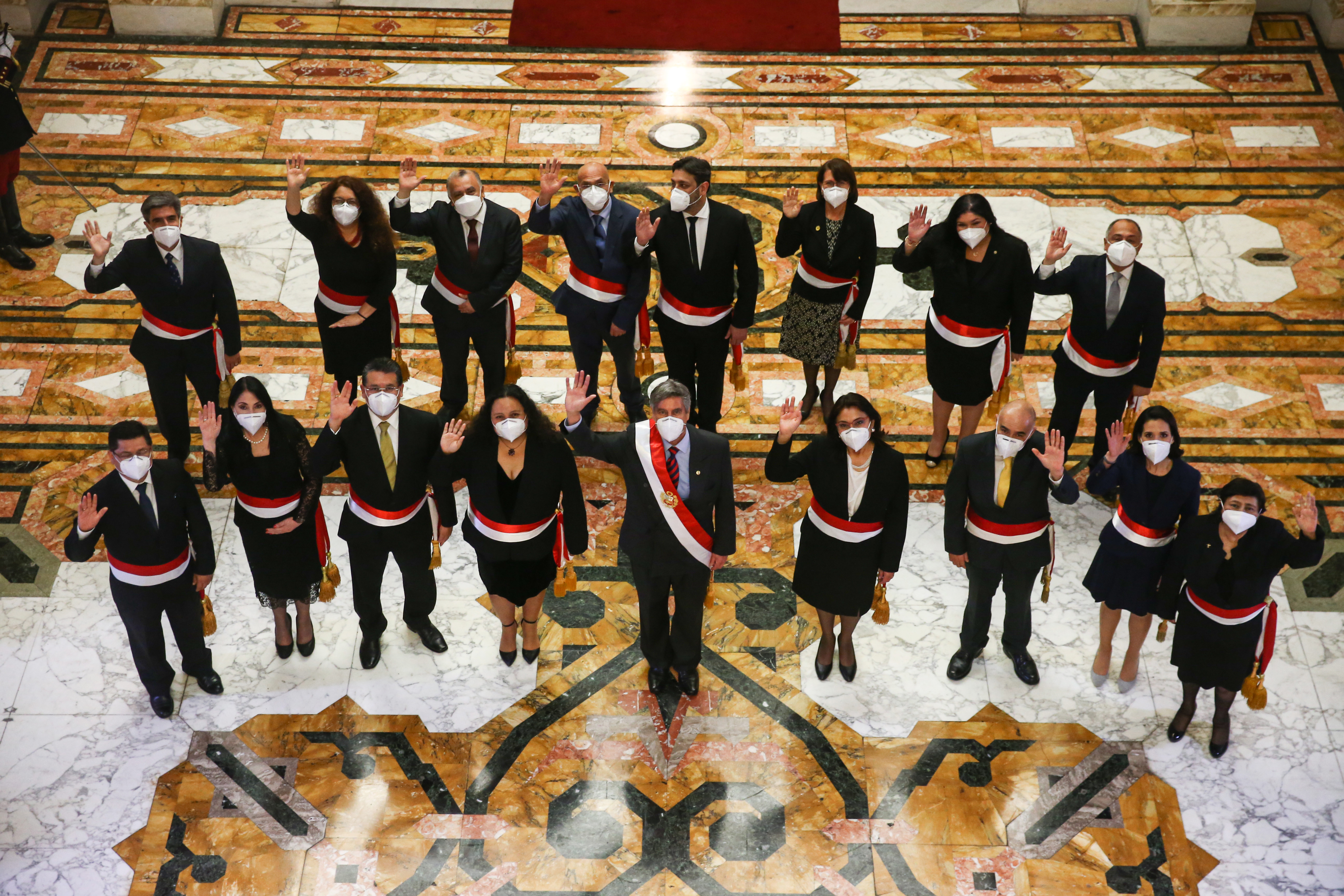
Cabinet of ministers led by Prime Minister Violeta Bermúdez.

Bermúdez Cabinet
- Cabinet of Peru
- 2020–2021
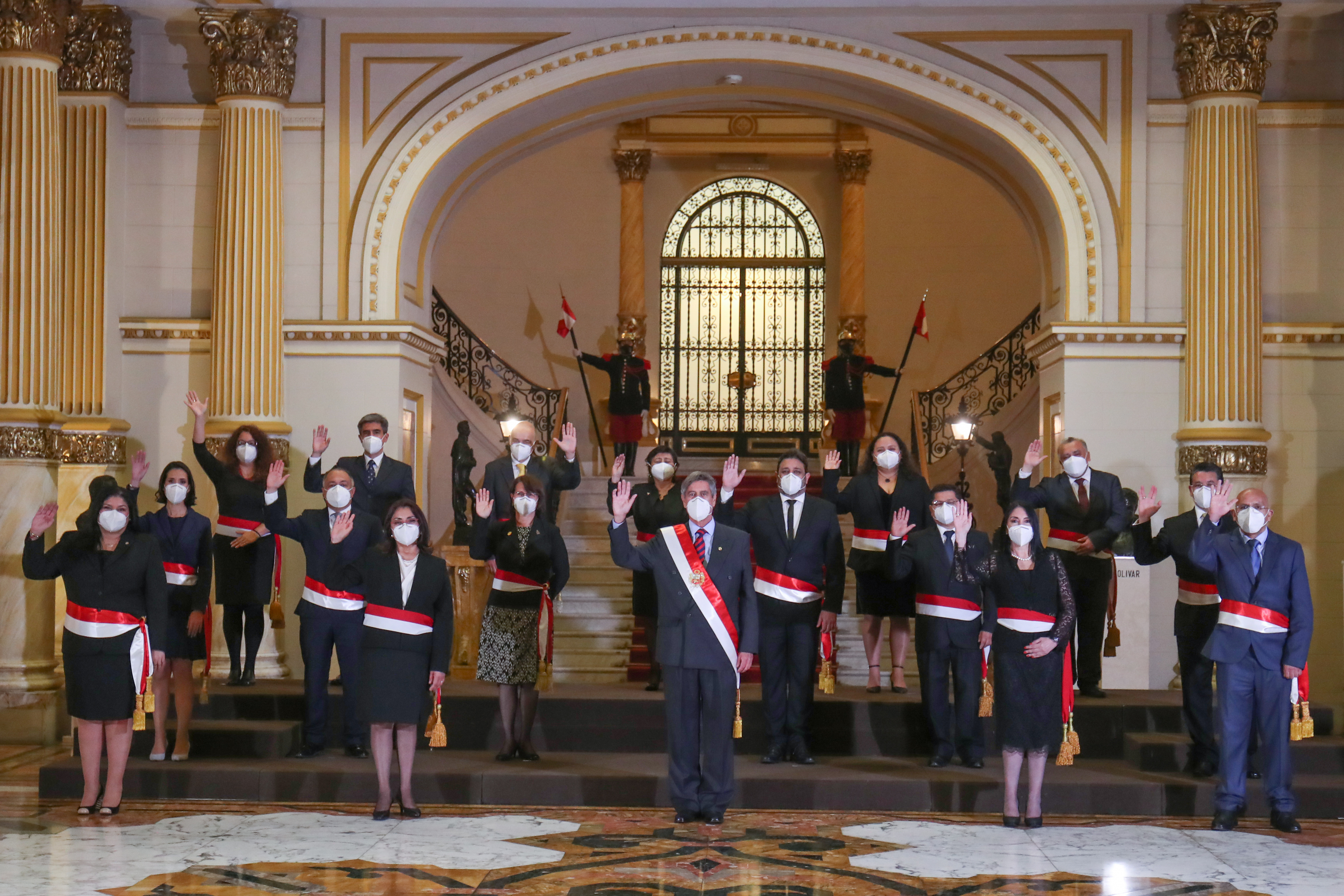
- Cabinet of Violeta Bermúdez
- Date formed: November 18, 2020
- Date dissolved: July 28, 2021

People and organisations
- President of the Republic: Francisco Sagasti
- President of the Council of Ministers: Violeta Bermúdez
- No. of ministers: 19
- Member party: Non-partisan (19)
- Opposition parties: Popular Action; Alliance for Progress; FREPAP; Podemos Perú; Union for Peru; We Are Peru

History
- Legislature term: 2016–2021
- Predecessor: Flores-Aráoz Cabinet
- Successor: Bellido Cabinet

On 3 December 2020, the Council of Ministers chaired by Violeta Bermúdez attended the Congress of the Republic to present the General Policy of the Government and the principal measures required by its administration (in compliance with Article 130 of the Political Constitution). The presentation took place amid the Agrarian Strike in the departments of Ica and La Libertad. During the debate, congressman Lenin Bazán Villanueva reported the death of a person in Virú Province, as a result of protests by agro-export workers. The various parliamentary groups withdrew their list of speakers and proceeded to vote. The Bermúdez Cabinet obtained the vote of confidence with 111 votes in favor.

=== ONP law ===
On 2 December 2020, the Congress of the Republic approved by insistence the bill for the "return" of up to S/4,300 in contributions to the Office of Pension Normalization (ONP). The bill had previously been objected to by the government of Martín Vizcarra in October. President Sagasti warned that, if the bill were approved, the Executive would present an unconstitutionality lawsuit before the Constitutional Court. On 7 December 2020, the minister of economy and finance, Waldo Mendoza Bellido, announced that the Council of Ministers would approve the filing of the lawsuit before the Constitutional Court.

On 9 December, Prime Minister Violeta Bermúdez announced that the Executive approved filing an unconstitutionality lawsuit.

=== General elections and electoral crisis ===
Sagasti urging citizens to participate in the elections in a message to the Nation on 9 April 2021.

During the vote count after the 2021 Peruvian general election, and following the publication of the results of the runoff by the National Office of Electoral Processes (which showed a favorable result for Pedro Castillo), Keiko Fujimori (his opponent), and her political party, Popular Force, carried out an unprecedented effort to reverse the result. Fujimori and her allies – who are part of Peruvian conservatism and who carried out an electoral campaign – promoted numerous unfounded claims that the elections had been stolen from them through an international communist conspiracy, (Note: This is not the first time that a phenomenon of coalition by the political right against groups outside it has been observed, at least since the 2000s. For a better understanding of the conspiratorial phenomenon that denoted divisiveness, see Caviar left in Peru.) and manipulation of electoral tally sheets.

The accusations were dismissed by the Peruvian electoral body, and rejected by electoral observers from the Organization of American States, the European Union, the Asociación Civil Transparencia, International IDEA, among others. The U.S. Department of State issued a statement describing the Peruvian electoral system as "a model of democracy in the region", and the elections themselves as "free, fair, accessible and peaceful". On the other hand, several Peruvian public figures (mainly Fujimori allies in the runoff and right-wing politicians) refused to publicly recognize Castillo's victory, insisting on electoral fraud and even requesting a repeat of the elections.

Fujimori's campaign submitted 945 annulment requests after election day, all of which were rejected by the Special Electoral Juries, and the National Jury of Elections. The official proclamation of Pedro Castillo as president-elect took place on 19 July 2021.

== Handling of the pandemic ==
=== Vaccination ===
Francisco Sagasti participating in the reception of the first batch with 300,000 vaccines on Sunday, 7 February 2021.

The first batch with 300,000 vaccines from the Chinese laboratory Sinopharm, which were part of a one-million-dose agreement, arrived in Peru on the night of Sunday, 7 February 2021. Vaccination officially began on 8 February and one of the first immunized individuals, together with medical personnel, was President Francisco Sagasti. Days later, the scandal known as Vacunagate came to light, provoking the resignation of Pilar Mazzetti, who was replaced by Óscar Ugarte. The new minister stated that despite everything, the vaccination process would not stop. The vaccination schedule prioritized frontline workers such as healthcare personnel, cleaning staff, members of the Peruvian Armed Forces, police officers, firefighters and people with rare diseases; afterwards, elderly people, followed by adults, youths and adolescents. Sagasti's administration reached agreements for more than 90 million vaccines with Pfizer, AstraZeneca, Sinopharm, Sputnik V and through the COVAX mechanism for the inoculation of people over 12 years old throughout the country.

=== Quarantine ===
The Executive implemented measures according to the level of health alert in which the provinces of the country were located: moderate, high, very high and extreme. On 26 January 2021, President Sagasti announced, through a Message to the Nation, that he was decreeing quarantine in 10 regions considered at extreme risk: Metropolitan Lima and Lima Region, Callao, Ancash, Pasco, Junín, Huancavelica, Huánuco, Ica and Apurímac. Initially, it was said that this measure would remain in force from 31 January until 14 February; however, it was decided to extend it until the end of the month, though this time focused on 32 provinces in 17 regions considered at extreme risk: Utcubamba, Arequipa, Camaná, Islay, Caylloma, Huamanga, Cutervo, Canchis, La Convención, Huancavelica, Ica, Chincha, Pisco, Metropolitan Lima, Callao, Huaura, Cañete, Barranca, Huaral, Huancayo, Tarma, Yauri, Chanchamayo, Tacna, Huánuco, Puno, Santa, Abancay, Pasco, Maynas, Ramón Castilla and Ilo. On 24 February, during a Council of Ministers meeting, it was decided to lift the quarantine and impose a curfew and mandatory social immobilization on Sundays. Despite the consistent increase in cases, the government only decreed temporary quarantines for Holy Week, for Mother's Day and for Father's Day.

=== Awareness campaigns ===
One of the videos from the "Pongo el hombro" campaign.

During the government of Sagasti, various communication strategies were issued to raise awareness and slow the spread of COVID-19. One of these was "No bajemos la guardia" ("Let's not lower our guard"), which sought to encourage citizens to continue complying with biosecurity measures such as washing hands, wearing masks, maintaining physical distancing and avoiding crowded places. Following the same line, the campaign "Dile no a las 3 'C'" ("Say no to the 3 'C's") was launched: no to close contact, no to closed spaces and no to crowded places. To promote vaccination, the Ministry of Health launched the "Pongo el hombro" ("I shoulder the responsibility") campaign, aimed at increasing public acceptance and demand for immunization through testimonies from already vaccinated individuals such as healthcare workers, members of the armed forces and older adults.

== Social aspects ==
=== Agrarian strike ===
Demanding the repeal of Emergency Decree 043-2019, which extended the validity of the Agrarian Promotion Law, and requesting labor improvements, agro-export workers began an indefinite agrarian strike in different sectors of Ica on 30 November 2020. The demonstrators blocked the South Pan-American Highway as a sign of protest. They were joined by day laborers from La Libertad, Piura and Apurímac. Labor minister Javier Palacios Gallegos attended a dialogue table in Ica, which failed to reach any agreement. The Executive sent a bill to Congress to modify the labor chapter of the Agrarian Promotion Law; however, Congress rejected the request and agreed to repeal the law and form a multiparty commission to create a labor regime for the agricultural sector. In response, Sagasti announced that he would not object to the law. After the repeal of the Agrarian Promotion Law, the protesters cleared the highways, but in the absence of a new law they once again took over the roads. The demonstrations left at least 12 dead and dozens injured.

=== Transport strike ===
On 9 December 2020, a group of transport workers blocked the South Pan-American Highway on the outskirts of Metropolitan Lima. The transport workers protested for "a fair universal pension" and "against the use and abuse of power" by the Urban Transportation Authority for Lima and Callao (ATU) and the supervisory body Sutran. The demonstrators burned tires on the road, preventing the passage of buses, cargo trucks and private vehicles. Hours after the blockade, the National Police dispersed the demonstrators.

Beginning on 13 March 2021, cargo transporters and interprovincial bus operators initiated a national strike by blocking the country's main highways. Among the transporters' demands were the elimination of the Selective Consumption Tax (ISC) applied to diesel, reduction in fuel prices and toll costs, suspension of the Morrope (Chiclayo) and Bayoyar (Piura) tolls, and a general amnesty for Sutrán fines, among others. On 16 March, interprovincial buses and trucks blocked the main entrance to Jorge Chávez International Airport. The following day, the Ombudsman's Office reported that the strike had spread to 21 regions of Peru. Traffic was restricted in the regions of Áncash, Apurímac, Arequipa, Ayacucho, Cajamarca, Callao, Cusco, Huancavelica, Huánuco, Junín, Ica, La Libertad, Lambayeque, Lima, Loreto, Pasco, Piura, Puno, San Martín, Tacna and Tumbes.

Prime Minister Violeta Bermúdez reported on 17 March that a commission chaired by the minister of transport and communications, Eduardo González Chávez, and composed of senior officials from the Ministry of Energy and Mines, the Ministry of Economy and Finance and the Presidency of the Council of Ministers had been engaged in dialogue regarding possible solutions to the measures adopted by the transporters. Representatives of the transport unions signed an agreement with the government committing themselves to reopen the highways, thus ending the indefinite strike.

=== Post-electoral protests ===
After the publication of the first electoral results of the second round of the 2021 general elections, supporters of both political forces mobilized through the principal avenues and streets of the city of Lima. They were joined by groups arriving from the interior of the country, as well as people living abroad. The protests, which took place almost daily, affected the vaccination process in some locations. Following this, interior minister José Elice emphasized that "mobilizations or acts affecting or interrupting the vaccination process will not be allowed". Days later, Elice reported that a police deployment had been carried out in the capital. After acts of violence against persons and private property were reported, Prime Minister Violeta Bermúdez stated that "violence should never be a tool to express anything".

== Controversies ==
=== Changes in the National Police ===
Sagasti announcing the appointment of César Cervantes Cárdenas as new commanding general of the PNP in a Message to the Nation on 23 November 2020.

On 23 November 2020, Francisco Sagasti announced that he had decided to make changes in the senior command of the National Police and stated that he would appoint General César Cervantes as commanding general. After the announcement, generals Orlando Velasco Mujica (commanding general), Jorge Lam Almonte (deputy commanding general), and Herly Rojas Liendo (inspector general) resigned from their posts. In their resignation letters, the generals warned that General Cervantes ranked number 18 on the officers' seniority list and that his future appointment would contravene Legislative Decree 1267 and Supreme Decree 011-2019-IN, making it illegal. Those rules establish that "the commanding general must be chosen from among the most senior lieutenant generals on the officers' seniority list. If lieutenant generals are not available, the shortlist will be completed with the most senior generals on the officers' seniority list".

Article 8.- Composition of the Senior Directorate The Senior Directorate of the National Police of Peru is composed of the Director General, the Deputy Director General, and the Inspector General. The Director General of the National Police of Peru is appointed by the President of the Republic from among the three General Officers of Arms of the National Police of Peru in active service, holding the rank of Lieutenant General, in strict order of seniority on the officers' seniority list, for a period of no more than two (02) years in office, and receives the honorary title of General of Police. In cases where the appointment of the Director General of the National Police of Peru falls to a General Officer of Arms of the National Police of Peru in active service, holding the rank of General, that officer shall be promoted to the rank of Lieutenant General.

— Legislative Decree No. 1267, Law of the National Police of Peru

Cervantes's appointment implied the retirement of 17 general officers. The appointment was made official on 24 November 2020 with the endorsement of interior minister Rubén Vargas Céspedes. Additionally, Edgardo Garrido López was appointed deputy commanding general and Arquímedes León Velasco as inspector general.

Amid the controversy, former interior ministers José Luis Pérez Guadalupe, Fernando Rospigliosi, Félix Murazzo, and Rómulo Pizarro expressed opposition to the changes made by President Sagasti. Pérez Guadalupe called for the resignation of the new commanding general and described the retirement order as illegal. Rospigliosi stated that the reform "does not correspond" to a transitional government. Murazzo maintained that "misinformation has led the President of the Republic into error". Pizarro maintained that the government could not ignore the regulations and that the measure violated police law. Likewise, former defense minister Roberto Chiabra asked President Sagasti to accept the resignation of interior minister Rubén Vargas Céspedes. Another former defense minister, Jorge Nieto Montesinos, questioned the government's decision and said that Sagasti must "abide by the law" to "comply with the requirements of a constitutional democracy".

In a statement, former commanding generals of the National Police considered that the measure resulted from a "misinterpretation" of the Police Law and described the retirement of 18 officers as an "antidemocratic maneuver" and as an "injury to institutional integrity".

On 27 November, 15 former interior ministers (Fernando Rospigliosi, Félix Murazzo, Rómulo Pizarro, Remigio Hernani Meloni, Octavio Salazar Miranda, Miguel Hidalgo Medina, Óscar Valdés Dancuart, Daniel Lozada Casapia, Wilver Calle Girón, Daniel Urresti Elera, José Luis Pérez Guadalupe, Vicente Romero Fernández, Mauro Medina Guimaraes, Carlos Morán, and César Gentille Vargas) expressed concern over the events and described the appointment of the new commanding general as a "violation of the law". Likewise, they considered that President Sagasti had been led into a serious error.

On 27 November, former president Martín Vizcarra considered that the change in senior command carried out by Sagasti "is not legal". The following day, congressman and former interior minister Daniel Urresti maintained that minister Rubén Vargas Céspedes "for dignity, should resign".

On 30 November 2020, Lieutenant General Edgardo Garrido López resigned as deputy commanding general of the National Police and General Óscar Gonzáles Rabanal resigned from the Directorate Against Organized Crime. On 1 December, the director of the General Office of Security and National Defense of the Ministry of the Interior, General Manuel Pacheco Ledesma, resigned from his position due to his disagreement with the change in the police high command. Likewise, General César Guardia Vásquez, director of the Directorate of Drug and Illegal Crop Control of the Ministry of the Interior, resigned, expressing his "disagreement" with the dismissals.

On the afternoon of 1 December, minister Rubén Vargas attended the National Defense, Internal Order, Alternative Development, and Fight Against Drugs Committee of the Congress of the Republic, where its chair and former interior minister Daniel Urresti questioned the appointment of the commanding general of the National Police. Urresti asked the minister to resign. That night, former defense ministers and former commanding generals of the Peruvian Armed Forces rejected the replacement procedure carried out in the National Police, describing it as "illegal" and maintaining that the decision "is contrary to the legal order, affects the morale of the National Police of Peru, and undermines the work that this institution carries out". Among the retired officers who signed were 22 division generals of the Army, 23 vice admirals of the Navy, and 17 lieutenant generals of the Air Force. Signatories included former president of the Republic Francisco Morales Bermúdez together with former defense ministers Julio Velásquez Giacarini, Roberto Chiabra, Jorge Kisic Wagner, Jorge Moscoso, Walter Martos, and Jorge Chávez Cresta; former heads of the Joint Command of the Armed Forces of Peru Pablo Carbone Merino, Víctor Bustamante Reátegui, Aurelio Crovetto Yáñez, José Williams Zapata, Jorge Montoya Manrique, José Aste Daffos, Francisco Contreras Rivas, Ricardo Howell Ballena, José Cueto Aservi, Benigno Cabrera Pino, and José Paredes Lora; former commanding generals of the Army Luis Alberto Muñoz Díaz, Jorge Céliz Kuong, among others.

On 2 December, journalist Nicolás Lúcar revealed the testimony of a former member of the deactivated Special Intelligence Group (GEIN), who revealed that the brother of the interior minister had been a leader of the terrorist group Shining Path. Within hours, Rubén Vargas Céspedes resigned from the Ministry of the Interior. That night, Cluber Aliaga Lodtmann was sworn in as the new interior minister. Two days later, the Lima Bar Association issued a statement maintaining that the appointment of the commanding general of the National Police "was not carried out in strict compliance with the regulatory framework". On 6 December, minister Cluber Aliaga said in an interview that the retirement of the generals was a "rushed" decision and that "there was no need to make such a rushed decision that generates unease in the police officer who has given so many years of service". The following day, minister Aliaga attended a session of the Justice and Human Rights Committee of the Congress of the Republic and presented videos that showed there were people who "incited violence" during the November 2020 protests, which prompted responses from the police. The police response was one of the reasons for which the generals had been retired. On the night of the same day, Aliaga resigned from the Ministry of the Interior.

On 9 December, the Ombudsman's Office asked the Government to restore the fundamental rights of those affected and stated that the decision had exceeded the powers granted by the Political Constitution of Peru. The body maintained that an incorrect interpretation of the Police Law had been made "that affects the institutional integrity of [the Police], contravenes the rules and standards set by the Constitutional Court and undermines fundamental rights".

=== Vaccines-gate (Vacunagate) ===
Sagasti and Bermúdez addressing the nation regarding the vaccines-gate case on 15 February 2021.

In February 2021, the scandal known as Vacunagate ("vaccines-gate") erupted. Journalist Carlos Paredes revealed on the program Beto a Saber, hosted by Beto Ortiz, that former president Vizcarra, his wife and his siblings had been vaccinated against COVID-19 in October 2020. The information was confirmed by Vizcarra himself. Following this, the Congress of the Republic summoned health minister Pilar Mazzetti, who had served during the Vizcarra administration. Likewise, they summoned President of the Council of Ministers Violeta Bermúdez and Minister of Labor and Promotion of Employment Javier Palacios Gallegos to report on the progress in the fight against the COVID-19 pandemic. Days later, more cases emerged of people who had allegedly been inoculated; there were more than four hundred. As a consequence, there was a ministerial crisis, with several ministers resigning, among them Mazzetti and Astete, who were replaced by Óscar Ugarte and Allan Wagner respectively.

=== Importation of vaccines ===
On 23 February 2021, then-presidential candidate Keiko Fujimori asked President Sagasti to reconsider his measure and allow private entities to import vaccines against COVID-19. The following day, Prime Minister Violeta Bermúdez stated that private entities would not be able to import vaccines because pharmaceutical laboratories did not negotiate with private parties. However, this statement was contradicted on 26 February by the ambassador of the Russian Federation to Peru, Igor Romanchenko, who said that his country would be willing to negotiate its Sputnik V vaccine with companies and regional governments. On 27 February, health minister Óscar Ugarte declared that "there is no problem" with private entities negotiating with Russia for Sputnik V vaccines. However, the following day Bermúdez contradicted Ugarte's statement and ruled out the possibility of private companies importing COVID-19 vaccines.

On 28 February, President Francisco Sagasti expressed opposition to the importation of vaccines by private companies and, during an interview on the program Cuarto Poder, argued: "What we do not want is for those who have money to get vaccinated while those who do not, do not". Following this, journalist Beto Ortiz called him a "communist". On 2 March, the president of the National Confederation of Private Business Institutions, María Isabel León, attended a meeting with President Sagasti and Prime Minister Violeta Bermúdez at the Government Palace to present the intention of private entities to acquire vaccines to immunize their workers.

== Opinion polls ==
=== Presidential approval ===
Pollster/Media outlet	Date	Sample	Francisco Sagasti (President of the Republic)			
Pollster/Media outlet	Date	Sample	Appr.	Disappr.	DK/NO	Diff.
Ipsos Perú/El Comercio	22–23 Jul 2021	1216	58	30	12	+28
IEP/La República	18–21 Jul 2021	1206	52	38	10	+14
Ipsos Perú/El Comercio	24–25 Jun 2021	1200	52	36	12	+16
IEP/La República	10–14 Jun 2021	1222	51	41	8	+10
IEP/La República	13–14 May 2021	1210	35	57	8	−22
CPI/RPP	7–12 May 2021	1200	30	60	10	−30
IEP/La República	19–21 Apr 2021	1221	21	64	15	−43
Ipsos Perú/América TV	14–16 Apr 2021	1207	28	63	9	−35
IEP/La República	22–25 Mar 2021	1225	20	65	15	−45
Datum/El Comercio	11 Mar 2021	1203	29	62	9	−33
IEP/La República	8–11 Mar 2021	1220	24.4	68.8	6.8	−44.4
IEP/La República	19–23 Feb 2021	1216	22	64	12	−42
Ipsos Perú/El Comercio	11–12 Feb 2021	1214	40	52	8	−12
IEP/La República	8–11 Feb 2021	1212	38	51	11	−13
IEP/La República	25–27 Jan 2021	1210	21	67	12	−46
Ipsos Perú/América TV	13–15 Jan 2021	1208	34	47	19	−13
IEP/La República	11–15 Jan 2021	1211	40	45	15	−5
IEP/La República	7–11 Dec 2020	1215	44	35	21	+9
Ipsos Perú/América TV	8 Dec 2020	1206	58	35	7	+23
IEP/La República	30 Nov–4 Dec 2020	1210	46	27	27	+19
