= Vacunagate =

Political scandal in Peru

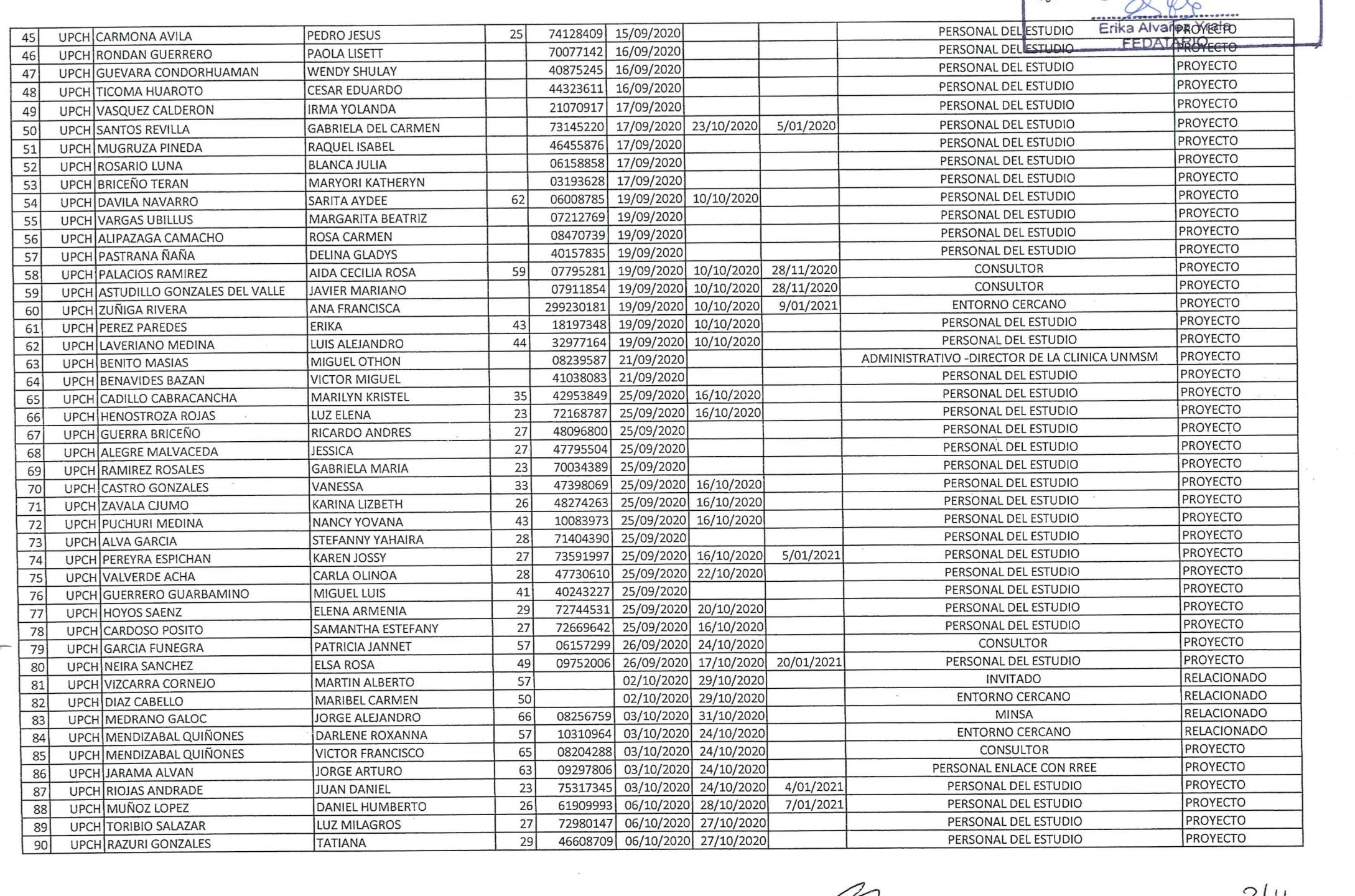
Page 2 of the list of the irregularly vaccinated, where the names of Martín Vizcarra (line 81) and Maribel Díaz Cabello (line 82) appear

Vacunagate (from vacuna, the Spanish word for "vaccine", and the suffix -gate; translatable into English as Vaccinegate) refers to a scandal in Peru over the irregular and secret COVID-19 vaccination of 487 people, mainly senior officials of the Executive Power of Peru.

== Context ==
The crisis began on February 10, 2021, with the revelation that in October 2020 a coronavirus vaccine intended for Phase III of the Sinopharm clinical trials was secretly given to then-President Martín Vizcarra.

Of the research teams at the two universities in charge of the study, the receipt and administration of the Sinopharm study vaccines, as well as the irregular order of 3,200 additional doses outside the clinical study, was given at the request of the medical researchers Germán Málaga and Hugo García Lescano, leader and coordinator of the research team of the Cayetano Heredia University who would have facilitated access to vaccines for senior officials, family members, and various people outside the volunteers at their headquarters of the clinical study and the direct personnel involved in it. The actions were aggravated when it was discovered that Germán Málaga administered three doses to 40 people at his headquarters, including himself and a deputy minister, irregularly and without written consent. Various university authorities vaccinated irregularly, including the rector and vice-rector, resigned as a result of the scandal. Finally, the National Institute of Health of Peru indicated the departure of the principal investigator responsible, and suspended the Cayetano Heredia University as the center for conducting new clinical trials.

The crisis was triggered by a report on the television program Beto a Saber, broadcast by Willax, revealing that former President Martín Vizcarra had received the candidate vaccine for the SARS-CoV-2 virus, intended for clinical trials conducted by Sinopharm in Phase III, in October 2020 at the Government Palace, in secret. Presidential candidate and economist Hernando de Soto Polar was also irregularly vaccinated. He initially denied an allegation of him being involved in the scandal, but it was exposed that he had flown illegally twice to the United States. De Soto was also detained for violating curfew and campaigning rules, and for being involved in Vacunagate on April 6, but was released the next day.

The inoculation of vaccines would have criminal consequences, as high-ranking officials of the Government of Francisco Sagasti were vaccinated, such as the Minister of Foreign Affairs Elizabeth Astete, the Minister of Health Pilar Mazzetti, the two Vice-Ministers of Health, and senior officials of the Foreign Ministry in the midst of negotiations with the Sinopharm laboratory for the acquisition of vaccines. Among the vaccinated officials, there are 8 members of the negotiating committee, who received the vaccine before and after the purchase process.

== Development of events ==
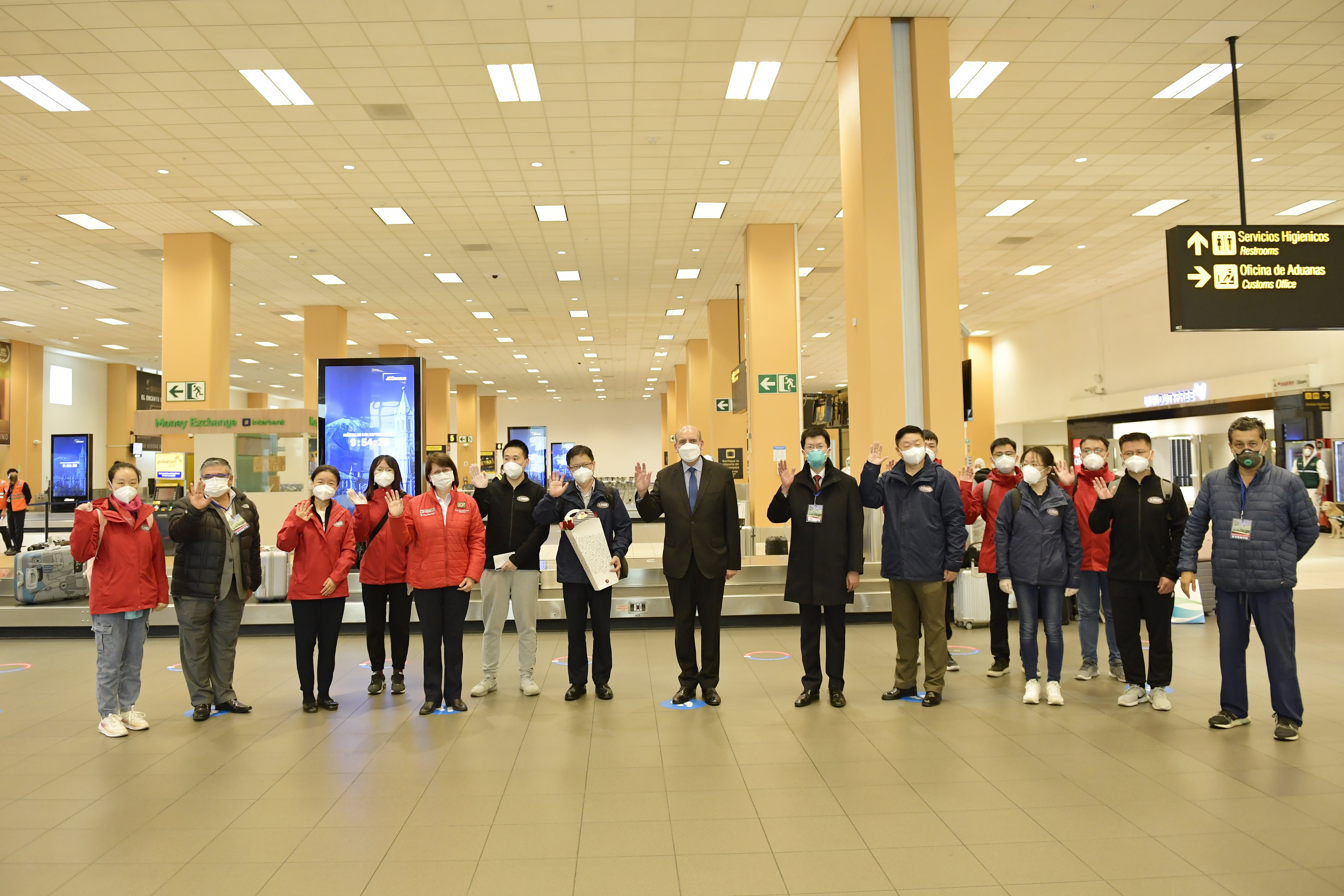
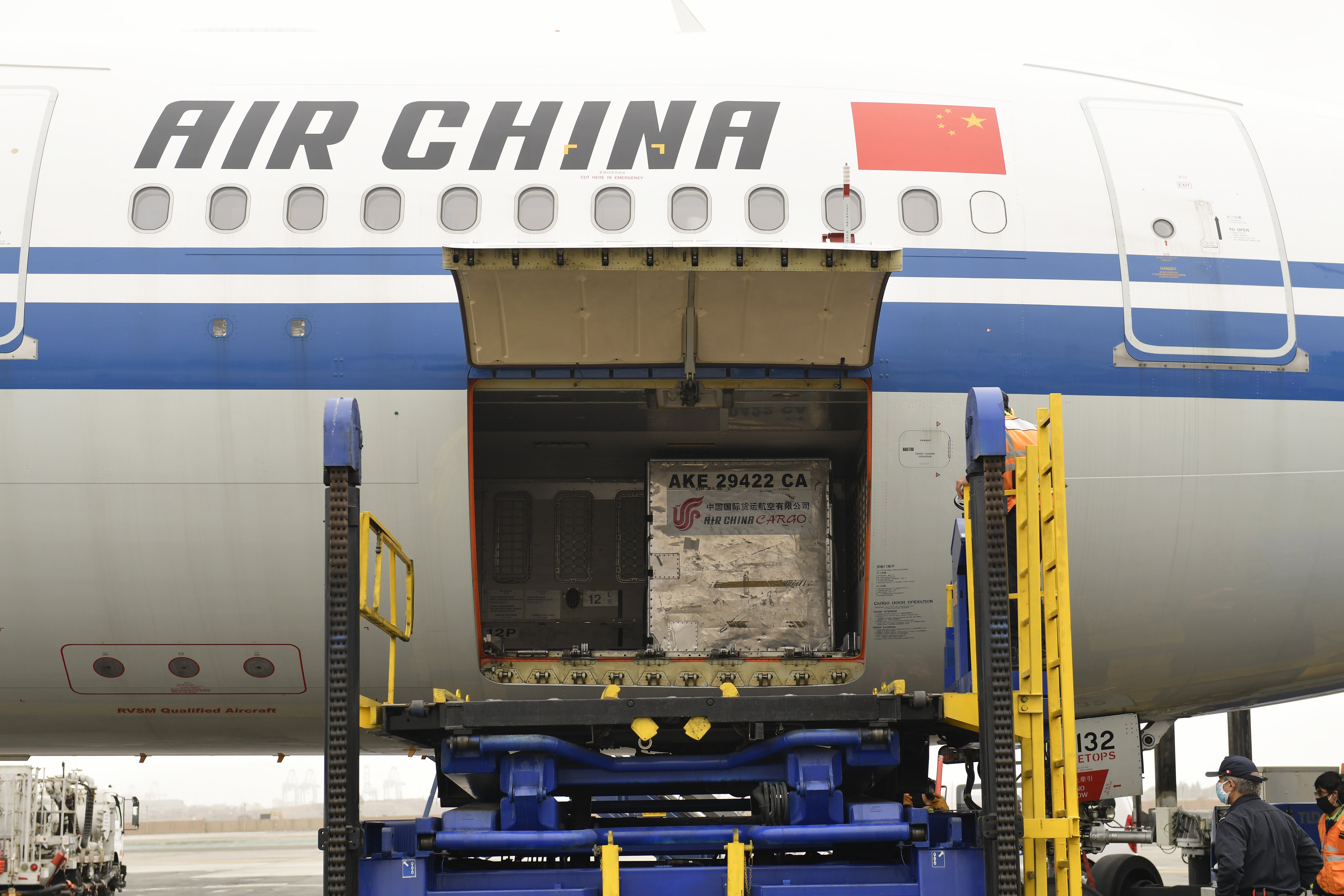
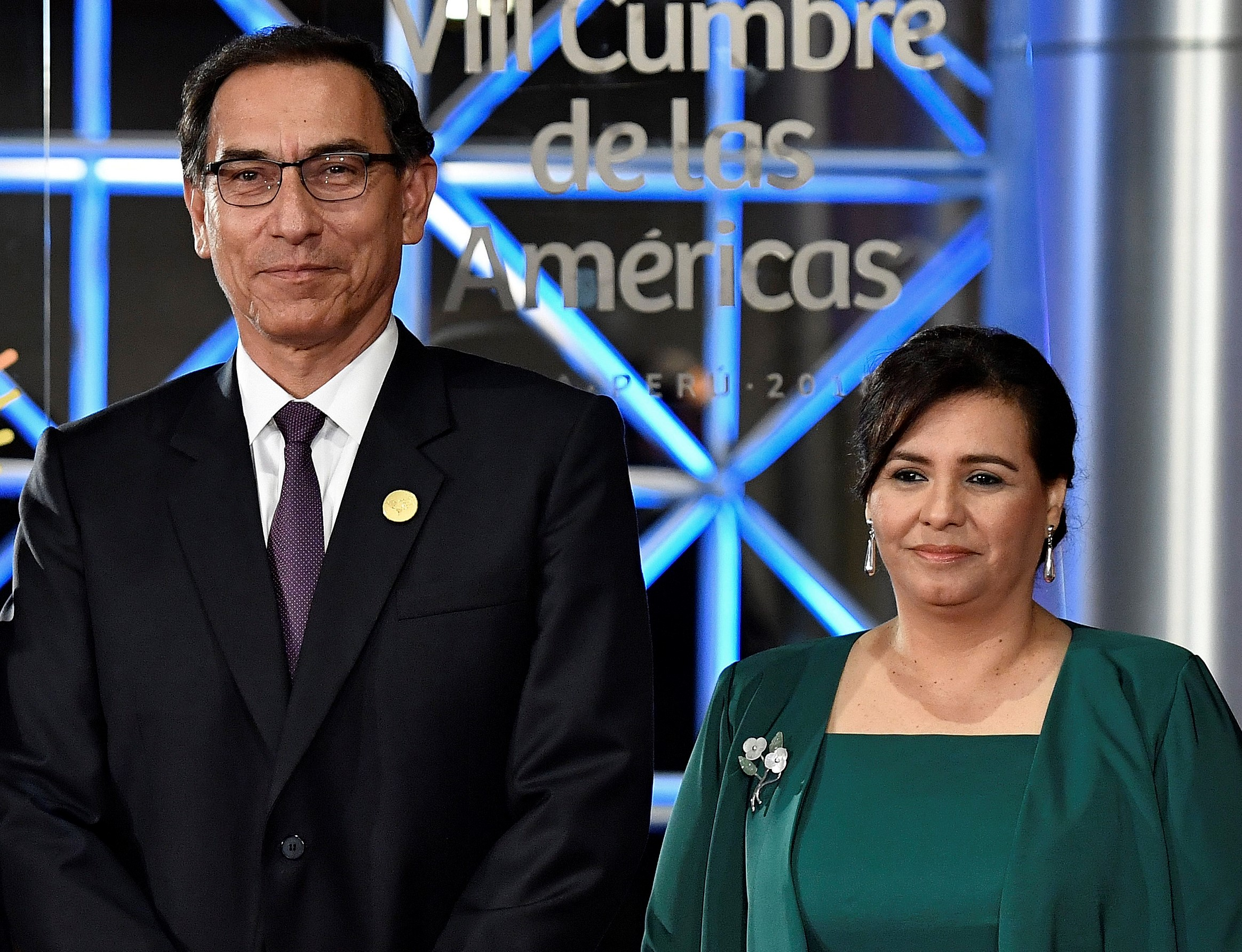
From top to bottom: The first two images show Sinopharm personnel being received by Minister of Health Pilar Mazzetti and Minister of Foreign Affairs Mario López Chávarri at Jorge Chávez International Airport, and the arrival of vaccines for the Phase III clinical trial in Peru on September 2, 2020; the third image shows the former presidential couple (2018–2020), Martín Vizcarra with his wife and former First Lady Maribel Díaz Cabello, who were vaccinated outside the clinical trial at the Government Palace on October 2, 2020.

On February 10, 2021, an investigation by journalist Carlos Paredes, aired on the television program Beto a Saber on Willax, revealed that former President Martín Vizcarra and his wife, Maribel Díaz, had been vaccinated against COVID-19 in October 2020. The information was confirmed the following day by Vizcarra himself, who told the press:

Finally, I made the brave decision to join the 12,000 volunteers and have the experimental test done. I confirm it was on October 2 [2020].

The following day, the Peruvian Congress summoned the President of the Council of Ministers Violeta Bermúdez, Minister of Health Pilar Mazzetti, and Minister of Labor Javier Palacios Gallegos to report on progress in the fight against the COVID-19 pandemic. The ministers appeared before Congress that same day, and Mazzetti stated that she was unaware of Vizcarra’s vaccination, adding that someone like the president should refrain from participating in a clinical trial. That same day, it became public knowledge that Dr. Germán Málaga of the Cayetano Heredia University, one of the two doctors responsible for the candidate vaccine trials in Peru, had visited the Government Palace on October 2 and 29, dates when the first and second doses of the candidate vaccine were allegedly administered to then-President Martín Vizcarra and his associates.

On February 12, various media outlets reported that a motion of censure against Minister Pilar Mazzetti was being drafted, but it did not garner the required number of congressional signatures or proceed further. Several congressional groups also rejected the idea of censuring Mazzetti. However, on the evening of February 12, Mazzetti resigned from her position.

On the morning of February 13, President Francisco Sagasti, in an interview on RPP, defended Minister Mazzetti and described the treatment she received from Congress as "unfair":

The doctor has been at the forefront of the Ministry of Health for many years, she has made an extraordinary effort, we have all seen how exhausted she is, and the treatment she has received, not only in the media but also in Congress, has been unfair.

On February 13, Óscar Ugarte assumed the role of Minister of Health. During the ceremony, the former minister was invited by the president to the balcony of the Golden Hall for the ministerial handover and was applauded by the government officials present.

On February 14, the Cayetano Heredia University issued a statement indicating that neither Martín Vizcarra nor his wife were volunteers in the clinical trials, as they were not listed in the study’s official records.

That same day, the newspaper La República reported that Peru had received 2,000 doses of Sinopharm’s experimental candidate vaccine outside the scope of the clinical trials. These doses were administered to some of the medical and technical staff involved in the trial, but also to several officials from the Ministries of Foreign Affairs and Health. The Minister of Foreign Affairs, Elizabeth Astete, also received the first dose of the Sinopharm candidate vaccine and resigned after her vaccination became public.

President Francisco Sagasti announced an investigation “to clarify the facts” surrounding the scandal. The new Minister of Health, Óscar Ugarte, further announced that the president had ordered the dismissal of any state employee who received the candidate vaccine irregularly, outside the clinical trial.

On the evening of February 14, in an interview on the program Cuarto Poder, Minister of Health Óscar Ugarte revealed that both vice-ministers of health, Luis Suárez Ognio (Public Health) and Víctor Bocángel (Health Services and Insurance), had been vaccinated, information known to Pilar Mazzetti. Ugarte also announced that he had accepted the resignations of both officials and that an Investigative Commission, chaired by former minister Fernando Carbone, would be formed.

On February 15, 2021, Allan Wagner was sworn in as the new Minister of Foreign Affairs in a ceremony held in the Golden Hall of the Government Palace. That same day, the National University of San Marcos, the other university responsible for the Sinopharm clinical trials in Peru, issued a statement indicating that its research team, led by Dr. Eduardo Ticona, had not vaccinated individuals outside the 4,500 volunteers or the 88 members of its research team. However, hours later, when the full list of individuals vaccinated outside the clinical trials was revealed, it was confirmed that the rector and vice-rector of research at the National University of San Marcos, as well as the rector, academic vice-rector, and vice-rector of research at the Cayetano Heredia University, had received the candidate vaccine.

The Embassy of the People’s Republic of China in Peru issued a statement indicating that it was unaware of the identities of the vaccinated senior officials and rejected the terms courtesy vaccines, donations, or perks amid the scandal involving the vaccination of senior officials in Peru.

On February 15, 2021, it was revealed that former Minister of Health Pilar Mazzetti had also been vaccinated. The newspaper El Comercio reported that Mazzetti had received the first dose in mid-January and the second on February 6.

On February 16, 2021, El Comercio detailed that eight members of the commission that negotiated with Sinopharm were vaccinated before and after the purchase agreement. The commission consisted of 18 members, including representatives from the Ministry of Foreign Affairs, the Ministry of Health, the Ministry of Economy and Finance, CONCYTEC, the Presidency of the Council of Ministers, the National Institute of Health (Peru), the Cayetano Heredia University, and the National University of San Marcos. Of these 18 commission members, eight were vaccinated.

On February 16, 2021, when questioned by the press about why he and others received three doses of the candidate vaccine when the standard was two doses, Dr. Germán Málaga stated that he did so with the idea of a potential future study, while acknowledging the irregularity of his actions. On December 17, when questioned about the vaccination of the owner of a Peruvian-Chinese restaurant, Málaga stated: "We have 12 people from the Chinese delegation who are constantly with us, and this person visits two to three times a week. The Chinese delegation gets tired of Burger King."

On February 17, 2021, Fernando Carbone, president of the Investigative Commission of the Ministry of Health, reported the existence of additional lists of individuals vaccinated against COVID-19. In a dialogue with RPP, he stated: “We have requested the information again. I’m sorry, I cannot comment now. We have received other lists that we are cross-referencing, lists from the INS, lists from the universities, lists from within the Ministry of Health, and lists from the general state scope identifying workers.”

The rector, vice-rector, and other authorities of the Cayetano Heredia University who were irregularly vaccinated resigned due to the scandal. On February 19, following an inspection of the university that confirmed various irregularities violating the study protocol, good practices, and ethical standards, the National Institute of Health (Peru) removed the principal investigator, Germán Málaga, and suspended the university as a center for conducting new clinical trials.

On February 19, the Prime Minister, Violeta Bermúdez, stated that the batch of questioned candidate vaccines was requested by the Ministry of Foreign Affairs. However, this information was contradicted by Foreign Minister Allan Wagner, who stated that Bermúdez’s claim was “a distorted version.”

On February 25, 2021, in a press conference, Fernando Carbone, president of the Investigative Commission, presented the final report to the Minister of Health, Óscar Ugarte.

=== Parliamentary investigation ===
On February 16, Germán Málaga, the researcher responsible for the clinical trial at the Cayetano Heredia University and who allegedly facilitated the administration of candidate vaccines outside the clinical trial to senior officials and unrelated individuals, was questioned by the Congress of the Republic regarding his involvement in the scandal and the legal and ethical implications of his actions. That same day, it was revealed that his daughter, wife, and sister-in-law had received the candidate vaccine. Additionally, through a review of migration records, it was identified that Málaga’s daughter, residing in Europe, had traveled to Peru in December and January specifically to receive both doses of the vaccine.

On the evening of February 16, 2021, the Congress of the Republic approved the formation of an Investigative Commission tasked with investigating the alleged favoritism in the administration of candidate vaccines against COVID-19 to senior public officials. With 100 votes in favor, the Congress Plenary approved the commission, composed of congress members Otto Guibovich Arteaga (Popular Action), Lusmila Pérez Espíritu (Alliance for Progress), Richard Rubio Gariza (FREPAP), Carlos Mesía (Popular Force), Luis Castillo Oliva (Podemos Perú), Roberto Chavarría Vilcatoma (Union for Peru), Absalón Montoya (Broad Front), Mariano Yupanqui Miñano (Democratic Decentralization), and Rubén Ramos Zapana (New Constitution). On February 18, the commission was established and elected Otto Guibovich as its president.

On February 22, 2021, the Subcommittee on Constitutional Accusations approved reports against former President Martín Vizcarra, former Minister of Health Pilar Mazzetti, and former Foreign Minister Elizabeth Astete. The former officials will face proceedings for constitutional violations (impeachment) and functional crimes (preliminary investigation).

== List of vaccinated individuals ==
The list of 487 individuals vaccinated outside the clinical trials includes those vaccinated as part of the research and administrative staff of the studies (whose vaccination was approved by DIGEMID despite being irregular) and individuals not directly related to the studies, including senior Peruvian government officials, their families, and university authorities responsible for the clinical trials.

=== Senior officials of Francisco Sagasti’s government ===
Ministry	Official	Position
Ministry of Health	Pilar Mazzetti Soler	Minister of Health (Peru)
Ministry of Health	Luis Suárez Ognio	Vice-Minister of Public Health
Ministry of Health	Víctor Freddy Bocangel Puclla	Vice-Minister of Health Services and Insurance
Ministry of Health	Danilo Pedro Céspedes Medrano	Head of the Advisory Cabinet of the Ministry of Health
Ministry of Health	Manuel Espinoza Silva	Advisor to the Vice-Ministry of Public Health
Ministry of Health	Pedro Guerrero Romero	Advisor to the Vice-Ministry of Public Health
Ministry of Health	Carlos Castillo Solórzano	Advisor to the Ministry of Health
Ministry of Health	Aldo Lucchetti Rodríguez	Director General of Strategic Interventions of the Ministry of Health
Ministry of Health	Víctor Raúl Cuba Oré	Director General of International Technical Cooperation of the Ministry of Health
Ministry of Health	Lucy Nancy Olivares Marcos	Executive Director of the Coordination Secretariat of the National Health Council
Ministry of Health	Luis Rodríguez Benavides	National Director of the National Center for Epidemiology
Ministry of Health	María Ticona Zegarra	Executive Director of Immunizations of the Ministry of Health
Ministry of Health	Sofía Patricia Salas Pumacayo	Executive Director of Pharmaceutical Products DIGEMID Ministry of Health
Ministry of Foreign Affairs	Elizabeth Astete Rodríguez	Minister of Foreign Affairs
Ministry of Foreign Affairs	Javier Sánchez Checa Salazar	Advisor to the Ministerial Office of Foreign Affairs
Ministry of Foreign Affairs	Francisco Tenya Hasegawa	Secretary General of the Ministry of Foreign Affairs
Ministry of Foreign Affairs	Jorge Arturo Jarama Alván	Director of Science and Technology of the Ministry of Foreign Affairs
Ministry of Foreign Affairs	Jorge Lazo Escalante	Director of State Ceremonial - Ministry of Foreign Affairs
Presidency of the Council of Ministers	Oscar Rafael Suárez Peña	Advisor to the Ministerial Office of the Presidency of the Council of Ministers
Presidency of the Council of Ministers	Fuente. Diario La República	

=== Senior officials of Martín Vizcarra’s government ===
Former Official	Position
Martín Vizcarra	President of the Republic

=== Other vaccinated individuals not listed as clinical trial staff ===
Person	Note
Maribel Díaz Cabello	Former First Lady of the Nation
César Vizcarra Cornejo	Brother of Martín Vizcarra
Patricia García Funegra	Former Minister of Health and researcher at the Cayetano Heredia University
Alejandro Aguinaga Recuenco	Former Minister of Health
Eduardo Pretell Zárate	Former Minister of Health
Inés Caro Kahn	Wife of the Vice-Minister of Public Health and doctor at the National Institute of Child Health
María del Carmen Suárez Ognio	Sister of the Vice-Minister of Public Health
Juliet Suárez Caro	Daughter of the Vice-Minister of Public Health
Luis Antonio Suárez Caro	Son of the Vice-Minister of Public Health
José Eduardo Gotuzzo Herencia	Researcher at the Peruvian Cayetano Heredia University
Germán Málaga Rodríguez	Principal Investigator at the Peruvian Cayetano Heredia University
Nelly Baiocchi	Researcher at the Peruvian Cayetano Heredia University
Luis Varela Pinedo	Rector of the Peruvian Cayetano Heredia University
Alejandro Joaquín Bussauleu Rivera	Vice-Rector of Research at the Peruvian Cayetano Heredia University
Andrés Guillermo Lescano	Member of the Governing Council of the National Superintendency of Higher University Education
José Ronald Espinoza Babilón	Academic Vice-Rector of the Peruvian Cayetano Heredia University (UPCH)
Orestes Cachay Boza	Rector of the National University of San Marcos
Felipe San Martín Howard	Vice-Rector of Research at the National University of San Marcos
Cecilia Blume Cillóniz	Former Head of the Advisory Cabinet of the Presidency of the Council of Ministers
Pablo Checa Ledesma	Former Vice-Minister of Labor
Ciro Maguiña Vargas	Vice-Dean of the Peruvian Medical Association
Ana Zúñiga	Wife of Germán Málaga, doctor at UPCH and one of the two leaders of the candidate vaccine study
Ariana Sofía Málaga Zúñiga	Daughter of Germán Málaga, doctor at UPCH and one of the two leaders of the candidate vaccine study
César Loo	Owner of the Royal Restaurant of chifa cuisine
Claudia Gianoli Keller	General Manager of Suiza Lab
Christopher Wiegering Gianoli	Commercial Manager of Suiza Lab
Marita de los Ríos Guevara	Former Director of Cenares (2016)
Daniel Wiegering Gianoli	Associate of Suiza Lab management
Antonio Armejo	Executive of the Fondo Blanquiazul
Nicola Girasoli	Catholic priest and Italian diplomat, apostolic nuncio in Peru
Carmen Ginocchio Cueva	Daughter of journalist Rosana Cueva
Juan Carlos Asencio Bermúdez	Driver of Pilar Mazzetti
Mario Mongilardi	Former President of the Lima Chamber of Commerce Source: Diario La República
Fuente. Diario La República

=== Second list ===
It was reported that a second list existed, although former Minister of Health Fernando Carbone stated that no such list existed. However, the Comptroller General of the Republic stated that investigations into a second list of vaccinated individuals were underway. Journalist Phillip Butters later suggested that Beto Ortiz was in possession of the second list.

== Reactions ==
The scandal has been described as an illegal act and a breach of political and scientific ethics by the general public and various national and international media outlets covering the case. The actions of senior Peruvian officials, such as former President Martín Vizcarra and former ministers Pilar Mazzetti and Elizabeth Astete, who accessed the vaccine irregularly, have been characterized as an ethical transgression, as well as an illegal act. Meanwhile, the conduct of Germán Málaga, the leader of the research team, has been described as scientific misconduct.

On February 26, Fernando Carbone, who chairs the investigative commission on improper vaccinations, specified that 470 individuals received the Sinopharm candidate vaccine dose without being part of the clinical trial, referring to the project’s volunteers. He explained that 369 individuals from the teams conducting the clinical trial were vaccinated, while 101 individuals, including personnel related to the study, Ministry of Health (Minsa) or Foreign Ministry staff, their close associates, and invitees, were also vaccinated. He noted that the first group received 706 doses, and the second group received 198 doses.

== Scientific misconduct ==
Germán Málaga Rodríguez, a Peruvian doctor and professor at the Cayetano Heredia University, confessed to administering candidate vaccines outside the protocol related to the Vacunagate case. Along with Hugo García Lescano and other researchers, he led the Sinopharm clinical trial, being primarily responsible for clandestinely facilitating access to the vaccine for senior officials, university rectors, family members, and even former President Martín Vizcarra. These irregularities violated the scientific integrity code of CONCYTEC, undermining ethical principles such as transparency, truthfulness, fairness, responsibility, objectivity, and impartiality. He was temporarily removed from his position as principal investigator at the university.

== See also ==
- 2017–2021 Peruvian political crisis
- Argentine COVID-19 vaccination scandal
- Irregular COVID-19 vaccination scandals

== Bibliography ==
- Castorena, Oscar; Lupu, Noam; Wolsky, Adam D.; Zechmeister, Elizabeth J. (March 9, 2023). "Corruption and Political Support: The Case of Peru's Vacuna-gate Scandal". Journal of Experimental Political Science: 1–12. doi:10.1017/XPS.2023.7. ISSN 2052-2630.
