= Pilar Mazzetti =

Peruvian politician and health minister

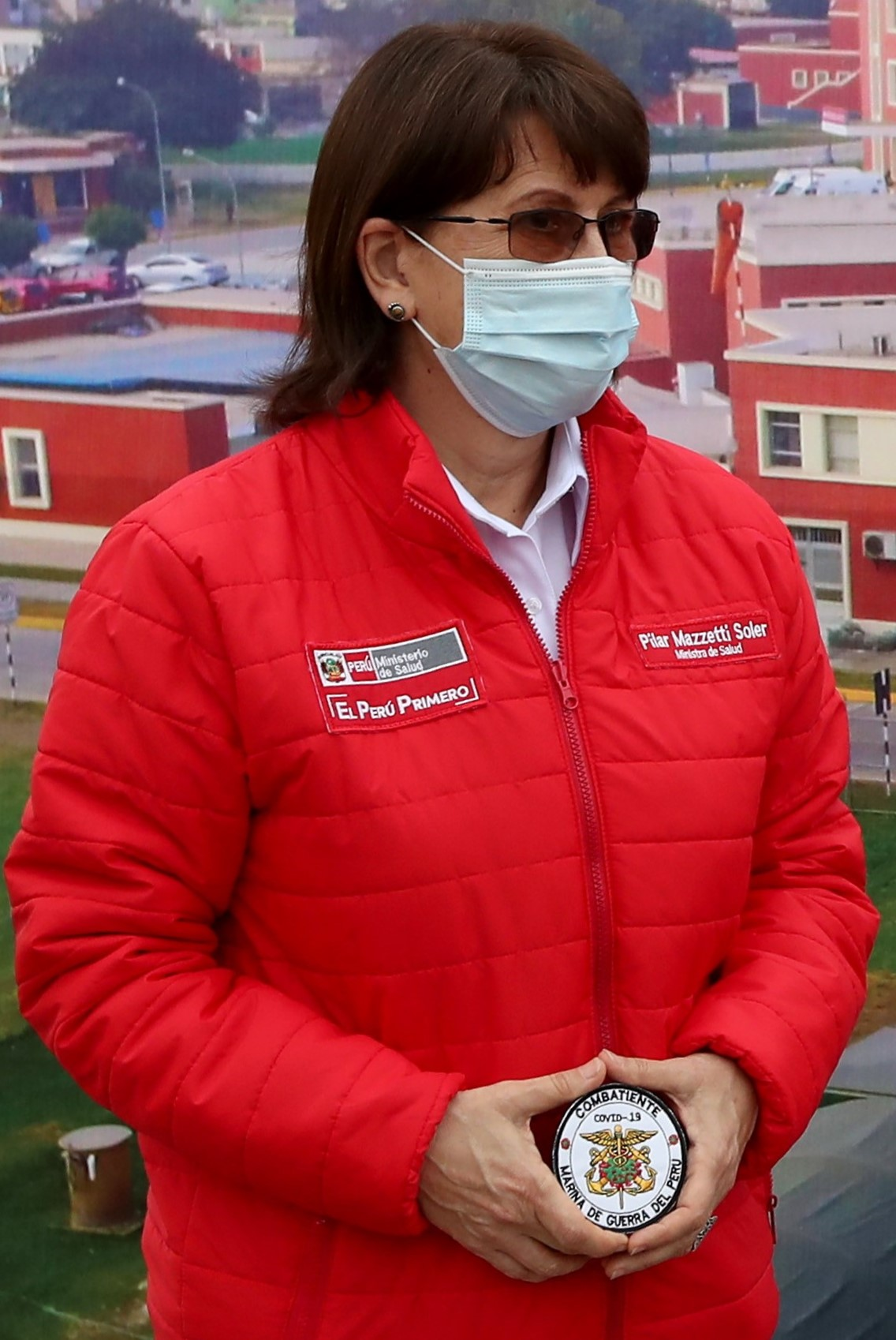
- Pilar Elena Mazzetti Soler

Minister of Health
- In office 18 November 2020 – 13 February 2021
- President: Francisco Sagasti
- Prime Minister: Violeta Bermúdez
- Preceded by: Abel Salinas Rivas
- Succeeded by: Óscar Ugarte
- In office 15 July 2020 – 9 November 2020
- President: Martín Vizcarra
- Prime Minister: Pedro Cateriano; Walter Martos
- Preceded by: Víctor Zamora
- Succeeded by: Abel Salinas Rivas
- In office 16 February 2004 – 28 July 2006
- President: Alejandro Toledo
- Prime Minister: Carlos Ferrero; Pedro Pablo Kuczynski
- Preceded by: Álvaro Vidal
- Succeeded by: Carlos Vallejos Sologuren

Minister of the Interior
- In office 28 July 2006 – 24 February 2007
- President: Alan García
- Prime Minister: Jorge Del Castillo
- Preceded by: Rómulo Pizarro
- Succeeded by: Luis Alva Castro

Personal details
- Born: 9 September 1956 (age 70) Lima, Peru
- Party: Independent
- Education: National University of San Marcos (MD) (PhD); San Martín de Porres University (MEd); ESAN University (MPA); César Vallejo University (MPA)
- Occupation: Health administrator
- Profession: Physician

Pilar Elena Mazzetti Soler (born 9 September 1956) is a Peruvian physician and health administrator who served as Minister of Health from July 2020 to February 2021, excluding her for nine days from office during the brief presidency of Manuel Merino. She previously held the position from February 2004 to July 2006, and was briefly Minister of the Interior from July 2006 to February 2007, being the first woman to reach said position in the Peruvian government.

== Early life and education ==
Mazzetti was born in Lima on 9 September 1956. Upon graduating from the San Jose de Monterrico School in the Santiago de Surco District, she enrolled in the Faculty of Medicine San Fernando of the National University of San Marcos, where she pursued a medical career.

Mazzetti graduated as a doctor in 1986; the same year she received the title of Surgeon, and in 1990 she graduated as a neurologist from the same university. In order to attain her specialization, she studied at the University of Paris between 1991 and 1993. Simultaneously, she completed neurology internships at the Pitié-Salpêtrière Hospital.

Upon returning to Peru, Mazzetti attained a master's degree in education at the San Martín de Porres University, specializing in Research and University Teaching. She also obtained two master's degrees in Public Management at ESAN University and César Vallejo University. Additionally, she attained a certificate in Senior Hospital Management at the Peruvian Institute of Business Administration (IPAE), and a diploma in Health Services Management at ESAN University

Most recently, Mazzetti completed doctoral studies in neuroscience at the National University of San Marcos, in 2010.

== Medical career ==
In 1990, Mazzetti was admitted to the National Institute of Neurological Sciences as a Resident Physician, serving until 1991, when she hired as a researcher in the team of neurologist Yves Agid at the French National Institute for Health and Medicine Research, at the headquarters in Paris.

From 1991 to 1993, she worked as a doctor at the Pitié-Salpêtrière Hospital.

From 1996 to 2000, she was executive director of the National Institute of Neurological Sciences, and from 2001 to 2003, she was General Director.

From 2000 to 2014, she worked as a Neurologist at the San Pablo Clinic.

In 2004, she was elected Dean of the III Regional Council of the Medical Colleges of Peru, a position she left to be sworn in as Minister of Health in February of the same year.

Since April 2014, she has been the Director of the National Institute of Neurological Sciences.

Mazzetti is a member of the Peruvian Society of Neurology, in which she has served as president.

== Minister of Health (2004–2006) ==
On 16 February 2004, Mazzetti was appointed Minister of Health by President Alejandro Toledo.

During her tenure, she faced various manifestations caused by the serious problems facing the health sector. Her main achievements include the construction of more medical care centres, as well as the reduction of infant mortality. Likewise, it made Peru one of the first Latin American countries to have a National Plan for Patient Safety.

At the end of 2005, Mazzetti headed the meeting of Ministers of Health of the Andean Community, where the problem of bird flu and its possible arrival in South America were discussed. Mazzetti was appointed by this Board and by other Ministries in the region as the representative to the European Union for all of South America.

In January 2006, Mazzetti faced a new strike for payments that the Labour sector could not make to EsSalud doctors, thus paralyzing health services. Mazzetti joined the strikers, stating that the lack of payments had also surprised her.

Mazzetti remained in the position of Minister of Health until July 2006, through the end of Alejandro Toledo's presidency. In her last months in the position, she was criticized by the Archbishop of Lima, Juan Luis Cipriani, for allowing the use of the contraceptive known as the morning-after pill.

== Minister of the Interior (2006–2007) ==
On 28 July 2006, Mazzetti was sworn in as Minister of the Interior at the start of the second presidency of Alan García, becoming the first woman to assume the position in Peruvian history. Upon taking the oath of office, she headed to the headquarters of the Ministry of the Interior, where she received from the hands of the former Minister Rómulo Pizarro, the portfolio dispatch. In her first address to the National Police of Peru, Mazzetti promised them that she would ensure the well-being of the Peruvian police family, as well as its rapid modernization. She also attended with Defence Minister Allan Wagner and the President Alan García, the formal recognition of the newly inaugurated president as Supreme Chief of the Armed Forces.

Mazzetti is one of the few government officials who have remained as Minister of State consecutively in two consecutive governments together with Diego García Sayán and Jaime Saavedra.

In February 2007, she faced a series of criticisms for the acquisition (via public bidding) of 469 trucks for the National Police of Peru, whose prices were considered by the media as overvalued. Mazzetti separated from the Ministry the officials of the General Administration Office (OGA) and the Office of Supply and Auxiliary Services involved in the Tender Committee. In the same way, she declared the reorganization of the General Administration Office.

On 24 February 2007, she tendered her resignation after an investigation into the purchase of ambulances was added during her tenure as Minister of Health. President Alan García accepted her resignation, and appointed former Vice President Luis Alva Castro as Mazzetti's successor.

== COVID-19 Operations Command Director and Minister of Health (2020–2021) ==
In March 2020, in the context of the COVID-19 pandemic in Peru, Mazzetti was appointed by President Martín Vizcarra as director of the COVID-19 Operations Command.

On 15 July 2020, President Martín Vizcarra reshuffled his cabinet under the leadership of Pedro Cateriano as Prime Minister of Peru, thus appointing Mazzetti to the Ministry of Health for a second time in her career.

Upon the rejection of confidence against the newly recomposed cabinet, Vizcarra proposed that Mazzetti take the office of Prime Minister of Peru and succeed Cateriano, which she did not accept. She was ratified in her portfolio under the new cabinet led by Walter Martos.

Following the removal of Martín Vizcarra from the presidency by the Peruvian Congress, Mazzetti resigned with the entire cabinet led by Martos. Although she was persuaded by incoming Prime Minister Antero Flores Aráoz to remain in the position in Manuel Merino's presidency, she refused to take office due to the nature of Merino's ascension to the presidency, considered a coup by the majority of Peruvians who participated in the 2020 protests. She returned to office with Francisco Sagasti, in the aftermath of Merino's resignation.

Mazzetti resigned as Minister of Health upon the revelation of former president Martín Vizcarra's secret COVID-19 vaccination with Sinopharm Group in September 2020 while Peruvians struggled due to the COVID-19 pandemic, with her knowledge. Facing a congressional vote of no confidence procedure, she tendered her resignation on 12 February 2021. She was succeeded on the following day by former minister Óscar Ugarte. It was also revealed that she secretly vaccinated on January 12, 2021, while she still was Minister of Health.

Government offices
Preceded by Alvaro Vidal	Minister of Health of Peru; 2004–2006	Succeeded by Carlos Vallejos Sologuren
Preceded by Rómulo Pizarro	Minister of Interior of Peru; 2006–2007	Succeeded by Luis Alva Castro
Preceded by Victor Zamora	Minister of Health of Peru; 2020–2020	Succeeded by Abel Salinas Rivas
Preceded by Abel Salinas Rivas	Minister of Health of Peru; 2020–2021	Succeeded by Óscar Ugarte
