= Óscar Ugarte =

Peruvian physician and government minister

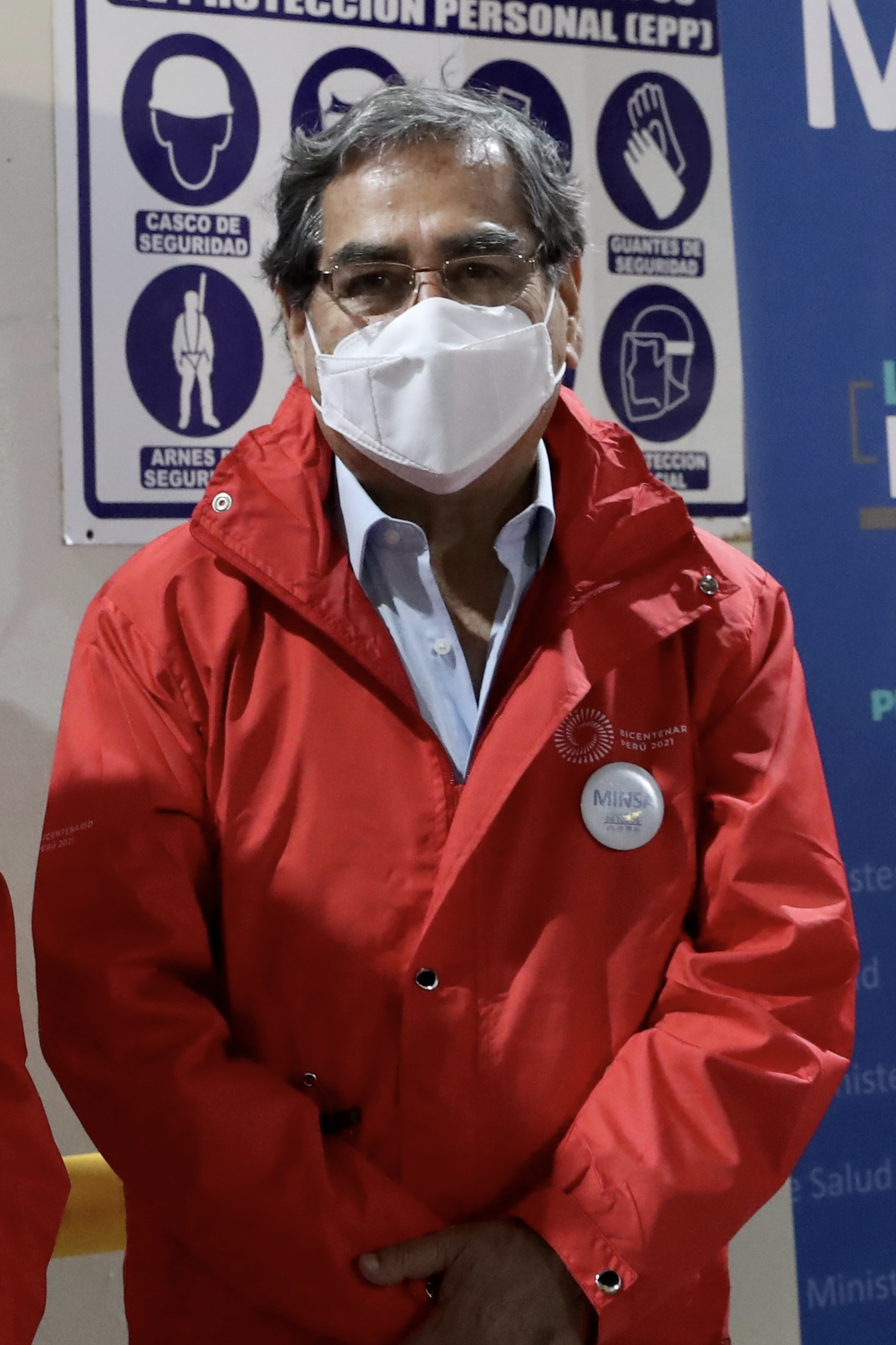
- Ugarte in 2021

Minister of Health
- In office 13 February 2021 – 28 July 2021
- President: Francisco Sagasti
- Prime Minister: Violeta Bermúdez
- Preceded by: Pilar Mazzetti
- Succeeded by: Hernando Cevallos
- In office 14 October 2008 – 28 July 2011
- President: Alan García
- Prime Minister: Yehude Simon; Javier Velásquez; José Antonio Chang; Rosario Fernández
- Preceded by: Hernán Garrido Lecca
- Succeeded by: Alberto Tejada Noriega

Deputy Minister of Health
- In office 22 January 2002 – 4 December 2002
- President: Alejandro Toledo
- Prime Minister: Roberto Dañino; Luis Solari
- Preceded by: Fernando Carbone Campoverde
- Succeeded by: Carlos Rodríguez Cervantes

Lima City Councilman
- In office 1 January 1984 – 31 December 1989

Personal details
- Born: Óscar Raúl Ugarte Ubilluz; October 30, 1944 (age 81) Pucallpa, Peru
- Party: Together for Peru (2017–present)
- Other political affiliations: Independent (2008–2017); Peruvian Humanist Party (2005–2007)
- Profession: Physician

Óscar Raúl Ugarte Ubilluz (born 30 October 1944) is a Peruvian physician who is the current Minister of Health under President Francisco Sagasti since 13 February 2021. He previously held the position under President Alan García from October 2008 to July 2011.

== Biography ==
Born in eastern city of Pucallpa, Ugarte studied medicine at the National University of San Marcos, where he attained his medical doctor degree. Upon completing medical school, he earned a master of Public Policy from the University of Barcelona.

== Career ==
In his professional career in the public health sector, Ugarte served as consultant for the United Nations Population Fund, and taught public health at the University of San Martín de Porres.

== Political career ==
Briefly during the presidency of Alejandro Toledo, Ugarte served as Deputy Minister of Health from January to December 2002. Subsequently, he served in advisory positions related to public health at the start of the second presidency of Alan García.

=== Minister of Health ===
==== First tenure ====
Following the resignation of Jorge del Castillo's cabinet in October 2008, García appointed him as Minister of Health, serving through the administration till July 2011. During the 2009 outbreak of influenza A (H1N1), Ugarte announced to the country that an Argentine citizen had said virus. This was later denied, as the tests were concluded without the factor N1 being confirmed. The media criticized him for this fact, but President Alan García defended him and congratulated him for his pessimism regarding the statement that the virus was already in Peru. After the arrival of the virus was verified, Ugarte began a national prevention campaign.

==== Second tenure ====
Almost a decade since he left office, Ugarte was called-up to return to the government upon the resignation of Pilar Mazzetti from the Ministry of Health due to Congress promoting a vote of no confidence against her for keeping secret former president Martín Vizcarra's COVID-19 vaccination from Sinopharm Group in early September 2020, while Peruvians struggled throughout the pandemic. He sworn in by President Francisco Sagasti on 13 February 2021. On 14 July 2021, during a protest near the Government Palace, his vehicle was attacked by supporters of presidential candidate and Popular Force leader Keiko Fujimori.
