= Peruvian Center for International Studies =

Peruvian research institute

The Peruvian Center for International Studies (CEPEI) is an institution dedicated to promote, organize and realize investigation projects, analysis, consulting, and publications of international affairs. It was founded in March 1983. Earlier it was Peruvian Centre for Social Studies.

Its members are renowned in the field of law and international relations, and some of them have become foreign affair ministers of the Peruvian government. In 2010, Shashi Tharoor, Indian Minister of State, visited the center.

== Founders ==
- Roberto Dañino Zapata
- Miguel de Althaus
- Fernando de Trazegnies
- Eduardo Ferrero
- Diego García Sayán
- Roberto Mclean
- Hugo Palma
- Delia Revoredo
- Alejandro san Martin (1936-2005)
- Allan Wagner
