= Angélica Monsalve =

Colombian anti-corruption activist and lawyer

Angélica Monsalve Gaviria

District Attorney

Personal details
- Born: 8 December 1970 (age 55) Medellín, Antioquia, Colombia
- Citizenship: Colombian
- Education: Universidad Católica del Táchira and Universidad Externado de Colombia
- Occupation: Human rights defender, Lawyer, District Attorney

Angélica Monsalve Gaviria (born 8 December 1970) is a Colombian human rights activist and a lawyer with a master's degree in procedural law from the Universidad Externado de Colombia. She is currently serving as district attorney in Bogotá, a seat she has held since 2017.

== Early life and education ==
Angélica was born in Medellín, Colombia, in a large middle-class family.

== Tickets collection case ==
In 2011, the contract to collect the TransMilenio public ticket in the Colombia capital district and fleet control was delivered to the brothers Carlos and Javier Ríos Velilla. A business that makes billions a year, as registered in district public data.

The Ríos Velilla brother accepted that business, despite the fact that Felipe Ríos their nephew simultaneously served as Bogotá councilor; fact that is prohibited in Colombia. This presumed conflict of interest, would have as main evidence the signing of the International Financial Corporation of the World Bank IFC and Recaudo Bogotá in February 2013, facts that were known by the Superintendency in Colombia, where it did not advance until 2022, when Angélica Monsalve resumed the forgotten case and accused the Ríos Velilla for allegedly violating the disability regime. Fews days later after accusation she received a notification of transfer to Putumayo on a non-business day, according to the journalist Daniel Coronell. This act was criticized by the former President of the Inter-American Commission on Human Rights Diego García-Sayán who stated that: “the arbitrary and unjustified transfer of prosecutors and judges without justification is an undue interference in judicial independence and a violation of the principle of immobility”, which was contradicted by the Office of the Attorney General of Colombia who stated: it was a strategic change within the normal functions of the entity and does not respond to a political pressure.

== Armored cars carousel case ==
Monsalve revived a complaint that was brought to the Office of the Fiscal General de la Nación of Colombia in 2014, today named Armored cars carousel, where high-ranking police officers, several public entities, armoring factories, and vehicle sales companies, allegedly incurred in irregularities for contract addressing in National Protection Unit Colombia using the Martín Ricardo Manjarrez and Yonn Jairo García influence, inside the entity responsible of providing security for congressmen, senior officials and threatened Colombians in the country. Both co-authors testified before to Martha Mancera attorney, who dismissed the complaint arguing that the conditions of mode, time and place were not defined, til the case came to Monsalve who listened to the testimony and revealed 14 of the ones involved in the case, including Rodolfo Palomino, Óscar Atehortúa Duque, Andrés Villamizar Pachón and Suzuki Motor. All of them accused by her.

== Complaint to the Fiscal General de la Nación ==
Monsalve denounced before the Commission of Accusations the Fiscal General de la Nación, Francisco Barbosa, for preventing a process that was underway against Christian Jaramillo Herrera, former director of UPME during the Iván Duque government, who as Noticias Uno documented, while he was at DIAN, he intervened in the review of a contract that ended up delivering to XM expertos en mercados S.A, where he had a seat at that time, without declaring himself impeded in this regard.

== Death threats ==
The Director of the Judicial Police reported that in development of the 'Condor' operation they received information of a possible attack in progress against Angélica Monsalve, on 5 April 2022 in which the Clan del Golfo would be the responsible.

Despite the statements of the Police, replicated by various national mean, the attorney assured that none of her investigations were related to this criminal group, by indeed her accused were other.

For its part, the Clan del Golfo, in a public communication, denied being the author of these threats, pointing instead to the Attorney General's Office for the alleged act.
