= Álvaro Vidal Rivadeneyra =

Peruvian politician (1942–2025)

Álvaro Vidal Rivadeneyra (October 22, 1942 – August 29, 2025) was a Peruvian politician.

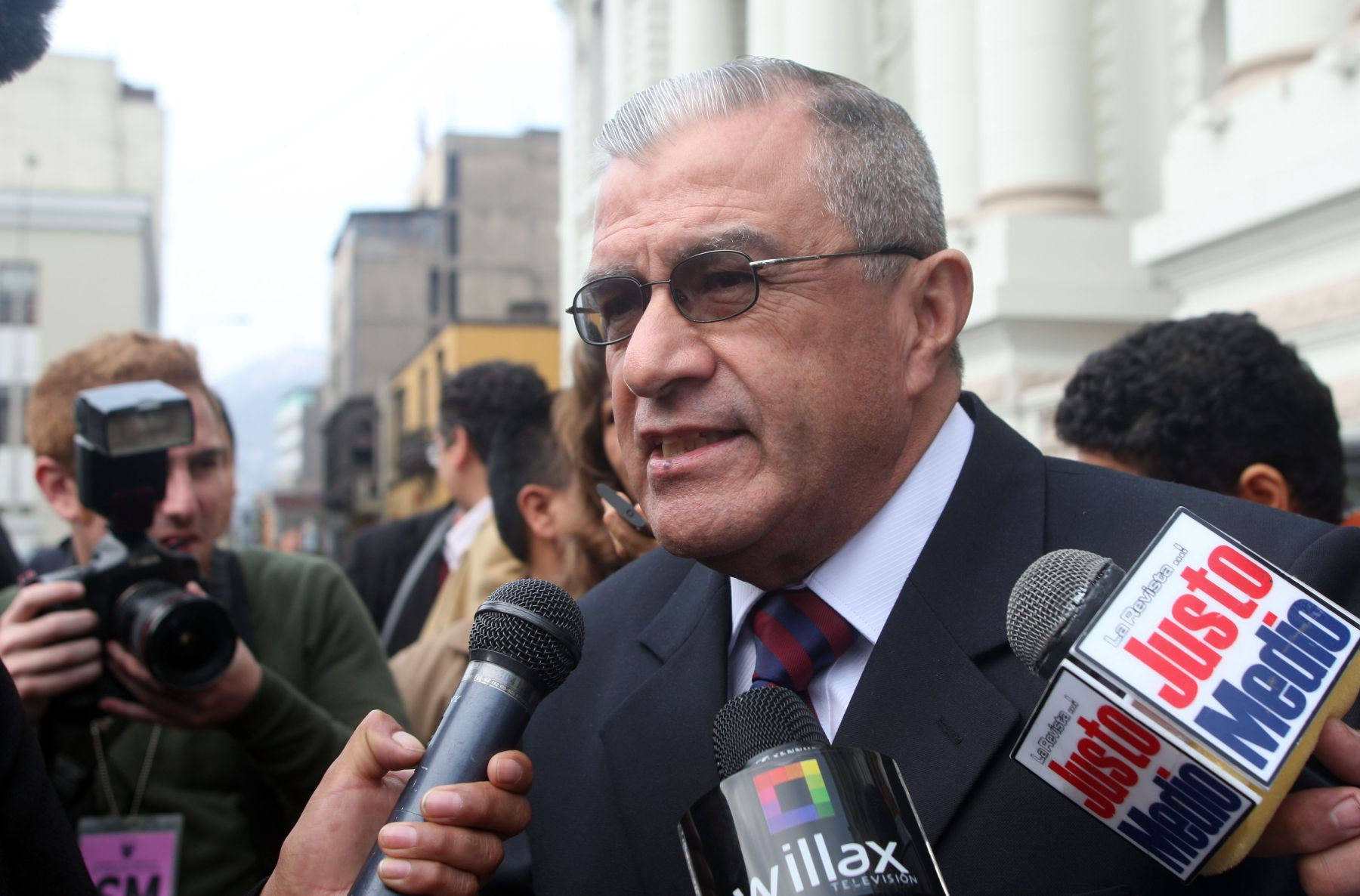
Vidal in 2011

== Life and career ==
Vidal was born on October 22, 1942 in the district of Pacarán, located in the province of Cañete.

Vidal was president of the Medical Association of Social Security of Peru (ANMSSOP), secretary general of the CEN of the "San Fernando" Faculty of Medicine of the UNMSM, member of the first board of directors of the National Association of Doctors of the Ministry of Health (ANMMS) and founder of the Hugo Pesce Social Medical Movement. He also worked at the Guillermo Almenara Irigoyen National Hospital and was elected as dean of the Medical College of Peru for the period 2002–2003.

On June 28, 2003, Vidal was appointed and sworn in by President Alejandro Toledo as Minister of Health of Peru, replacing Fernando Carbone, and during his administration he participated in the High-Level Forum on the Millennium Development Goals on Health, Nutrition and Population, organized by the World Health Organization and the World Bank. He remained in office until February 16, 2004, when he was replaced by Pilar Mazzetti.

Vidal Rivadeneyra died on August 29, 2025, at the age of 82.
