= Mónica Pinto =

Argentinian lawyer and professor

Mónica Pinto (born 1952) is an Argentinian lawyer. She studied law at the University of Buenos Aires, graduating with a first degree in 1975, and a PhD in 1983.

On August 1, 2015, Pinto became a UN Special Rapporteur on the independence of judges and lawyers. She held this position until being replaced by Diego García Sayán in 2016.

Pinto is a Professor of international law and of international human rights law at University of Buenos Aires Law School, and a judge in the World Bank Administrative Tribunal as well as at the Inter-American Development Bank Administrative Tribunal.

Pinto is currently serving as a Judge ad hoc in the Land and Maritime Delimitation and Sovereignty over Islands (Gabon/Equatorial Guinea) case before the International Court of Justice (ICJ). She was appointed by Gabon.
