= Carlos Vallejos Sologuren =

Peruvian physician and politician

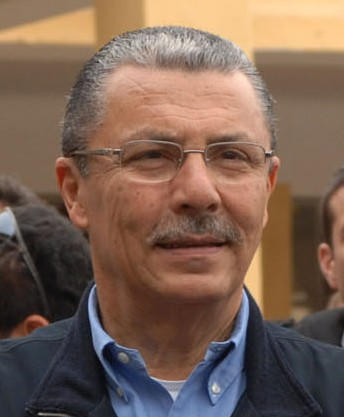
Carlos Vallejos Sologuren aboard the USNS Comfort in 2007

Carlos Santiago Vallejos Sologuren (born 1940) is a Peruvian physician and politician. He is a member of Alianza Popular Revolucionaria Americana. He was the Minister of Health between 2006 and 2007.

== Biography ==
Carlos Vallejos was born in 1940 and he studied in Anglo-Peruvian School of Lima (now Colegio San Andrés). His medicine studies was done in National University of San Marcos and Cayetano Heredia University. Between 1966 and 1967 he was internist in Hospital Arzobispo Loayza and the Maternidad de Lima.

He continued his career in Texas University and then he worked in Baltimore and Texas Hospitals.

On July 27, 2006, Alan García named him as Minister of Health of Peru.

Political offices
Preceded by Pilar Mazzetti	Minister of Health of Peru; 2006 – 2007	Succeeded by Hernán Garrido Lecca
