= Diego García-Sayán =

Peruvian politician

Diego García-Sayán OC OSP gcYC
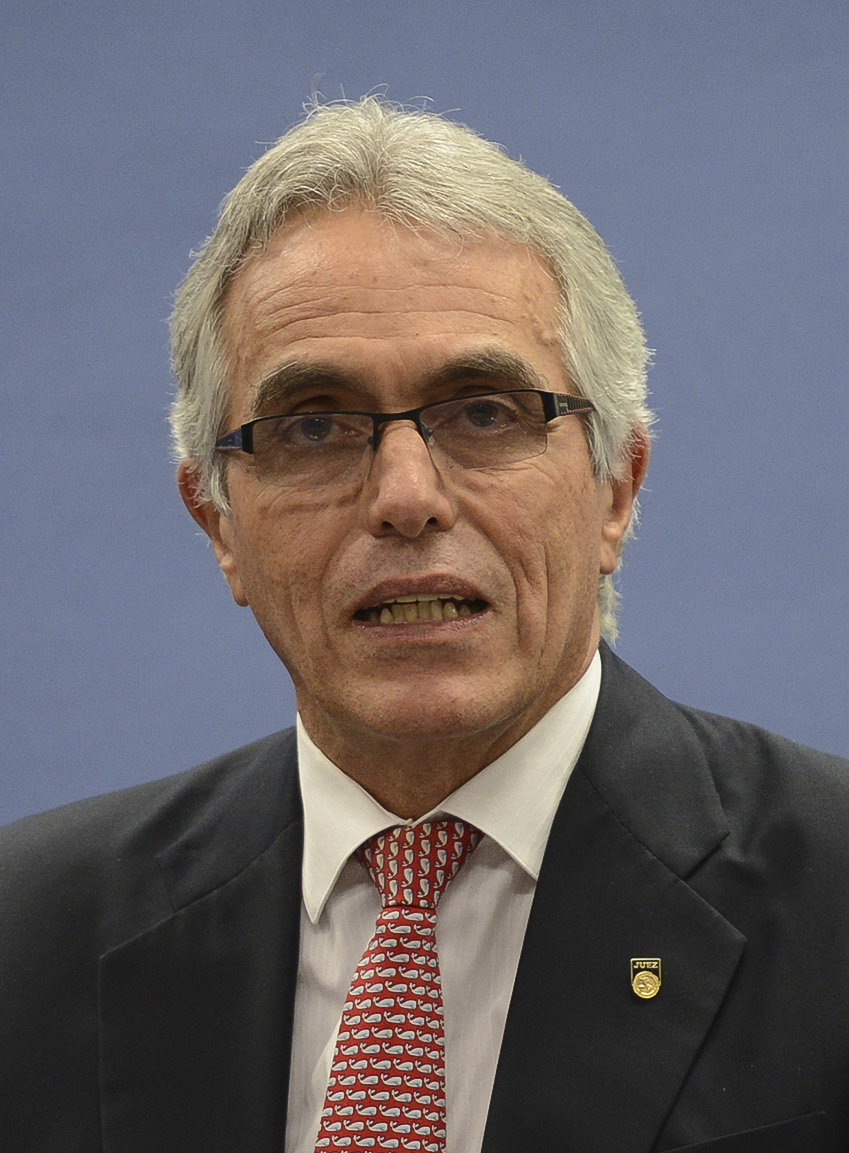

United Nations Special Rapporteur on the Independence of Judges and Lawyers
- Incumbent
- Assumed office 13 December 2016
- Preceded by: Mónica Pinto

President of the Inter-American Court of Human Rights
- In office 1 January 2010 – 1 January 2014
- Preceded by: Cecilia Medina
- Succeeded by: Humberto Sierra

Minister of Foreign Affairs
- In office 28 July 2001 – 12 July 2002
- President: Alejandro Toledo
- Prime Minister: Roberto Dañino
- Preceded by: Javier Pérez de Cuéllar
- Succeeded by: Allan Wagner Tizón

Minister of Justice and Human Rights
- In office 27 November 2000 – 28 July 2001
- President: Valentín Paniagua
- Prime Minister: Javier Pérez de Cuéllar
- Preceded by: Alberto Bustamante Belaúnde
- Succeeded by: Fernando Olivera

Personal details
- Born: Diego García-Sayán Larrabure; 2 August 1950 (age 75) Brooklyn, New York City, U.S.
- Spouse: Eda Rivas Franchini
- Parent(s): Enrique García-Sayán; Carmen Larrabure
- Education: Pontifical Catholic University of Peru

Diego García-Sayán Larrabure (born August 2, 1950) is a Peruvian lawyer and former Foreign Affairs Minister of Perú. He sat as judge of the Inter-American Court of Human Rights, and was president of the Court between 2010 and 2012. He was the United Nations Special Rapporteur on the independence of judges and lawyers.

On August 15, 2014, the Peruvian Government formally announced its launching of García-Sayán's candidacy in the upcoming 2015 election for the post of Secretary-General of the Organization of American States (OAS), a decision which was rescinded unilaterally by the candidate himself on October 1, 2014, as a result of what he said was the said Government's lack of proper support towards that end.

== Biography ==
García Sayán was born in Brooklyn, New York, the youngest son of Dr. Enrique García-Sayán, a former Foreign Affairs Minister of Perú who, in 1946, was associated, along with President José Luis Bustamante y Rivero, with launching the so-called "200 Nautical Miles (370.4 km) Territorial Doctrine", currently being adhered to and claimed by Benin, Congo, Ecuador, El Salvador, Liberia, Perú and Somalia. After the 1948 coup d´état which overthrew the constitutionally elected Government of President Bustamante, Dr. García-Sayán went into exile, working with the United Nations first in New York, then in Geneva, which led a year later to his son Diego's birth in the United States.

== Professional and political activities ==
García-Sayán co-founded the Peruvian Center for International Studies (CEPEI) in 1980. He subsequently founded the Andean Commission of Jurists (CAJ) in 1982 and served as executive director until 2000 except for a brief hiatus from 1992 to 1994. He is also a member of Washington D.C.–based think tank the Inter-American Dialogue.

He also worked for the United Nations in many expert and senior positions. He has served as member of the United Nations Working Group on Enforced or Involuntary Disappearances from 1988 to 2004, including as chairperson of the mechanism. From 1991 to 1992 he joined the UN Negotiating Team appointed by Secretary General Boutros Boutros-Ghali to mediate into the Guatemalan Peace Process between the Government and the URNG. From 1992 to 1994 he worked as Director of the Human Rights Division within the UN Observer Mission in El Salvador (ONUSAL).

On 1995 he joined former United Nations Secretary General Javier Pérez de Cuéllar in his unsuccessful bid for the Presidency of the Republic of Peru against the incumbent candidate President Alberto Fujimori, and won a seat in the Congress. under the banner of the political party Union for Peru. Following the political collapse of the Fujimori's regime a Transitional Government was formed and García-Sayán was called by President Valentín Paniagua to serve as Minister of Justice from 2000 to 2001. Newly elected President Alejandro Toledo appointed García-Sayán as Minister of Foreign Affairs, holding the post from 2001 to 2002.

The 33rd period of General Assembly of the Organization of American States held in Santiago de Chile in 2003 elected García-Sayán to serve a six-years term as Justice of the Inter-American Court of Human Rights starting in 2004 and he served as the Court's vice-president for the 2008–09 period. Re-elected for a second mandate, he served as President of the Court for the 2010-12 period.

On January 27, 2017, United Nations Secretary-General António Guterres designated him a member of the Selection Mechanism for the Special Jurisdiction of Peace, established in Colombia in 2016.

Also, since January 2017 he is Special Rapporteur on the Independence of Judges and Lawyers for the United Nations. He is also currently serving as an advisory board member of the Global Judicial Integrity Network at the United Nations Office on Drugs and Crime (UNODC).

== Education ==
García Sayán attended the "Santa María" School, graduating from high-school in 1967. He then attended the Pontifical Catholic University of Peru in Lima, graduating with a bachelor's degree in 1969. He continued his studies at the University of Texas, at Austin in 1970, and returned to the Pontifical Catholic University of Peru for his law degree in 1975, where he has, since then, also taught law.

On his spare time, Mr. García Sayán is a percussionist and motorcycle enthusiast, the former from his times as a teenager, when he and several of his school friends as well as others from other schools, formed the rock group Los Hang Ten's.

Political offices
Preceded by Alberto Bustamante Belaúnde	Minister of Justice and Human Rights; 2000–2001	Succeeded by Fernando Olivera
Preceded by Javier Pérez de Cuéllar	Minister of Foreign Affairs; 2000–2001	Succeeded by Allan Wagner Tizón
Preceded by Cecilia Medina	President of the Inter-American; Court of Human Rights; 2010–2014	Succeeded by Humberto Sierra
Diplomatic posts
Preceded by Mónica Pinto	United Nations Special Rapporteur on the Independence of Judges and Lawyers; 2016–present	Incumbent
