= Fernando Carbone Campoverde =

Peruvian medical surgeon (1959–2024)

Minister of Health of Peru
- In office 21 January 2002 – 29 June 2003
- President: Alejandro Toledo
- Prime Minister: Roberto Dañino Zapata
- Preceded by: Luis Solari
- Succeeded by: Álvaro Vidal Rivadeneyra

Vice Minister of Health of Peru
- In office 11 December 2001 – 21 January 2002

Personal details
- Born: Fernando Ignacio Carbone Campoverde; 14 March 1959 Lima, Peru
- Died: 18 November 2024 (aged 65)
- Education: Universidad Nacional Mayor de San Marcos

Fernando Ignacio Carbone Campoverde (14 March 1959 – 18 November 2024) was a Peruvian medical surgeon. He was the Minister of Health of Peru from 2002 to 2003.

== Background ==
Fernando Carbone Campoverde was the son of Juan Carbone Fossa and Nelly Campoverde Ayres. He studied at the Colegio San Agustín in Lima, later entering the National University of San Marcos, where he studied medicine.

Between 1995 and 2000, he was a member of the Family Commission of the Peruvian Episcopal Conference. Between 1998 and 1999, he was a member of the Ethics Commission of the Medical College of Peru. He collaborated with the Government Planning Commission of Possible Peru in 2000 and was a member of the Transfer Commission of the Health Sector in 2001. From 1990 he was a consultant and speaker on the themes of poverty, development, family planning, international cooperation, strategic planning and organizational development.

He was the Vice Minister of Health of Peru between 2001 and 2002, and the Minister of Health between 2002 and 2003. Carbone Campoverde later worked as a project coordinator for Medicus Mundi International in Peru.

Carbone Campoverde died on 18 November 2024, at the age of 65.

== Minister of Health ==
Carbone completed a number of large projects as Peruvian Minister of Health. In 2002 Carbone issued a proposal of reforms to replace the General Health Law, limiting various reproductive rights in the process. This included his extending legal rights to fertilized eggs from the moment of conception, a proposal which received much criticism. Another object of criticism was his refraining from the distribution of the Next Day Pill across the country, despite demands from various NGOs.

An official 2002 report by Carbone suggested that the government of Alberto Fujimori had been involved in the forced sterilizations of almost 250,000 people between 1996 and 2000, predominantly indigenous women.
