= Elizabeth Astete =

Foreign minister of Peru (2020–present)

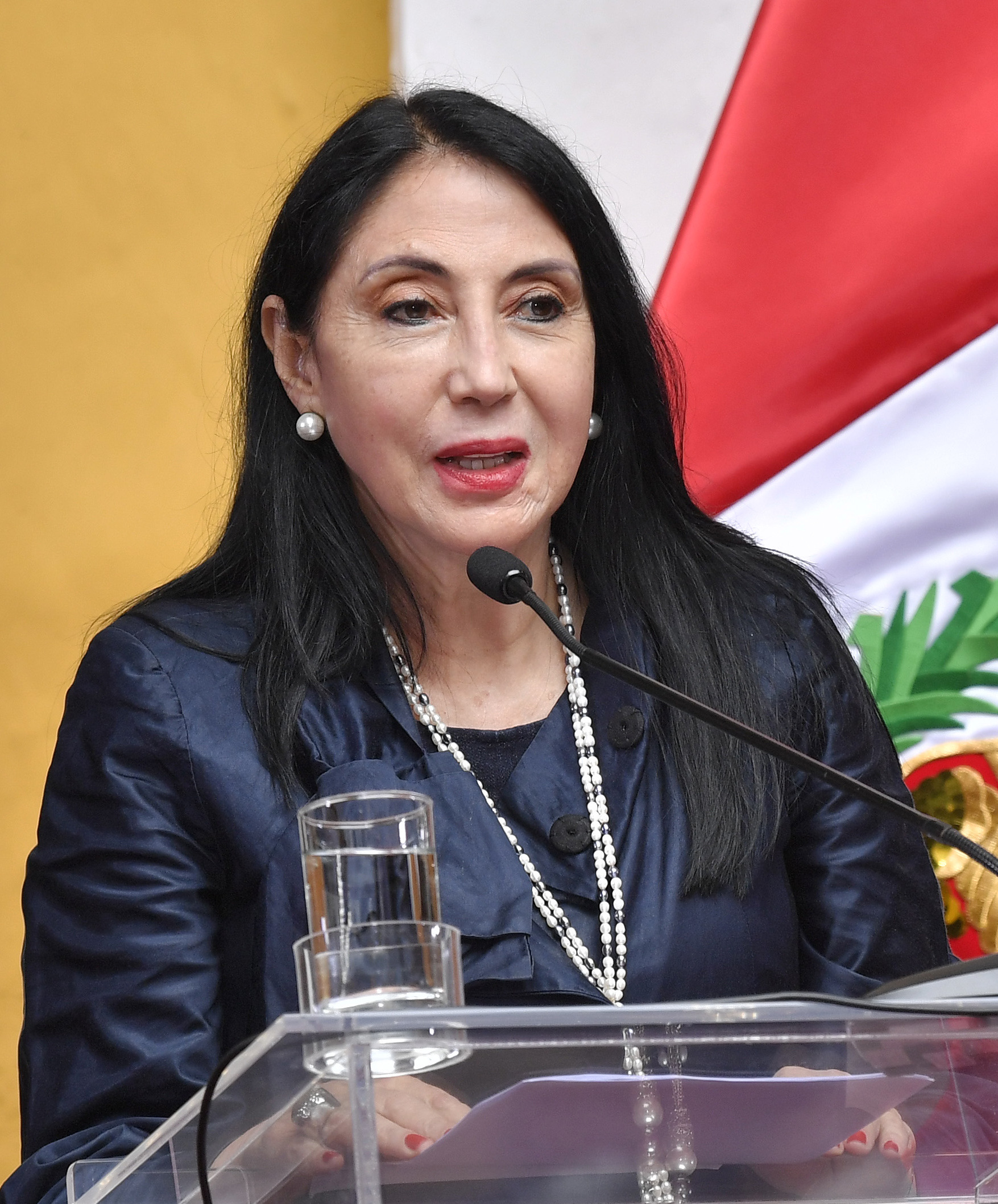

Minister of Foreign Relations
- In office 18 November 2020 – 14 February 2021
- President: Francisco Sagasti
- Prime Minister: Violeta Bermúdez
- Preceded by: Franca Deza
- Succeeded by: Allan Wagner Tizón

Personal details
- Born: Esther Elizabeth Astete Rodríguez; 30 March 1952 (age 74) Peru

Esther Elizabeth Astete Rodríguez is a Peruvian politician who served as the country's Foreign Minister from 18 November 2020 to 14 February 2021.

== Education ==
Astete Rodríguez has a degree in International Relations.

== Career ==
Astete Rodríguez has been a member of Peru's Diplomatic Service since 1975, serving as ambassador to Mexico, Ecuador and Switzerland. She was also Peru's Permanent Representative to the United Nations in Geneva from 2004.

Astete Rodríguez was Peru's under-secretary for Economic Affairs of the Ministry of Foreign Affairs in 2009.

She was appointed Foreign Minister by President Francisco Sagasti in the cabinet of Prime Minister Violeta Bermúdez on 18 November 2020. She was one of eight ministers sworn in after Sagasti and Bermudez replaced President Manuel Merino and Prime Minister Ántero Flores Aráoz (who each served for five days).

== Awards and honours ==
- Medal of the National Order of Merit in the degree of Commander (Ecuador)
- Distinguished Services in the Degree of Grand Cross
