= Rómulo Pizarro =

Peruvian politician

Rómulo Pizarro Tomasio (born August 20, 1955 in Arequipa) is a former Peruvian Interior Minister.
