= Beto Ortiz =

Peruvian writer (born 1968)

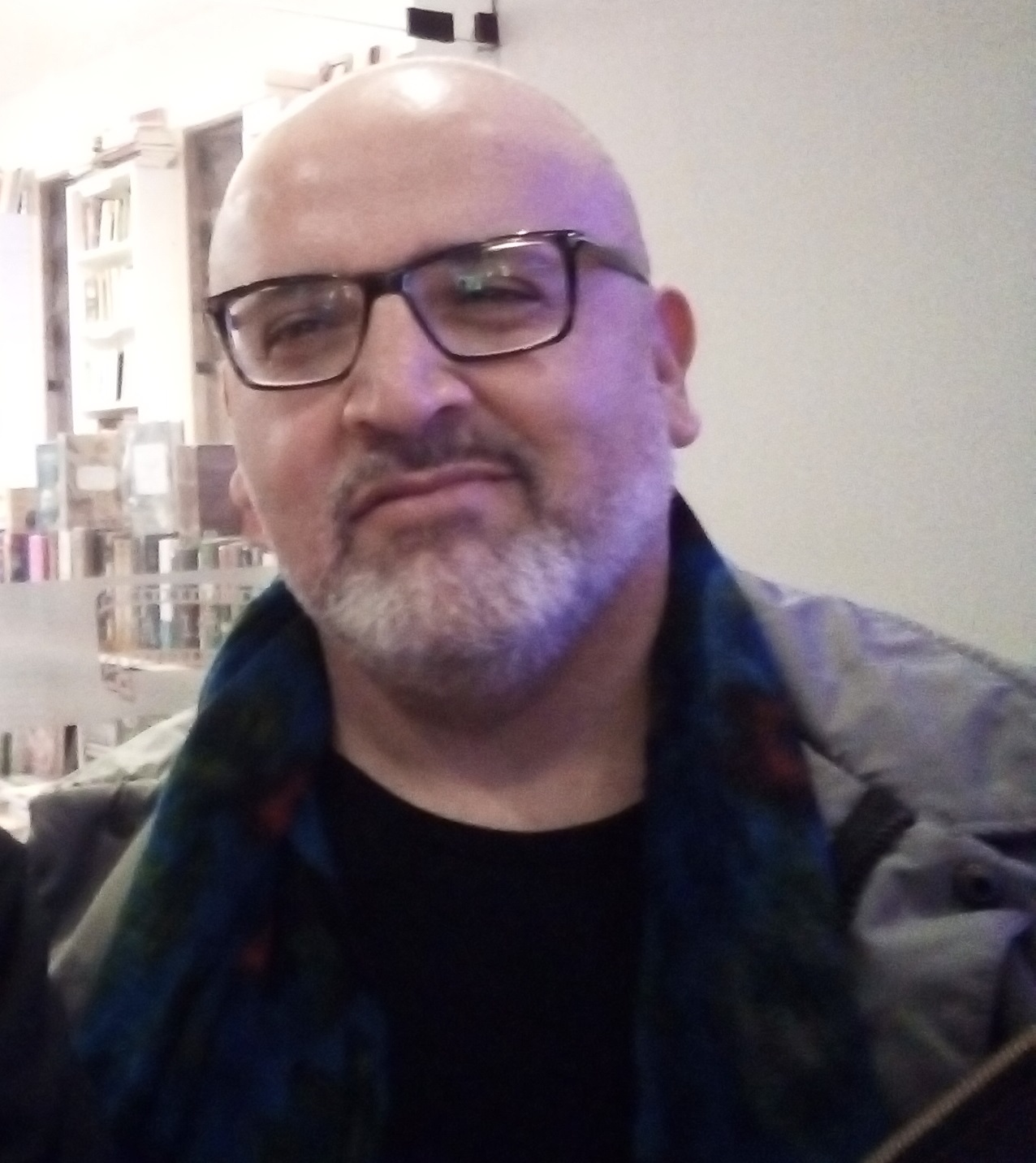
Ortiz in 2019

Beto Ortiz (born Humberto Martin Ortiz Pajuelo, 1968 in Lima) is a Peruvian TV personality and writer. As of October 2006, he lives in Lima; before that, he lived in New York City. His claim to national fame was through Beto A saber (2000), a politically incorrect TV talk-show from which he harshly criticized Alberto Fujimori's government while most of the Peruvian media remained silent.

One of his first appearances in Peruvian media was through several humorous stories he wrote for "No", a humorous supplement to Si, a very well known Peruvian magazine in 1987.

During 15 years, Ortiz directed and hosted late-night shows and documentary series on national television. As a TV reporter he is the author of hundreds of stories on social and political issues, some of which were recognized with international awards. As a writer, he has published features and columns in the main newspapers and magazines in Peru. He is a columnist for the Peru 21 newspaper. His first novel, Maldita Ternura ("Damned Tenderness") (Lima: Editorial Alfaguara, 2004) was a best-seller in Peru. He was the host of his own TV interview show Callate Beto ("Shut up Beto") on RBC (Channel 11, Lima, Peru).

He co-hosted the TV show Enemigos Intimos ("Intimate Enemies") on Frecuencia Latina along with colleague and writer Aldo Miyashiro from March 2008 to the first-quarter 2010, before being released from his journalistic duties in Frecuencia Latina due to ideological issues with the new executive management, more specifically Chief Executive Javier Urrutia.

Shortly after being released, he returned to TV, co-hosting the TV show Enemigos Publicos ("Public Enemies") on Panamericana Television along with Aldo Miyashiro. In August 2010, Beto Ortiz quit "Public Enemies" due to controversial declarations against Jaime Bayly in a TV report. A short time later, "Public Enemies" was cancelled and replaced with another late night show, hosted by Miyashiro only, and different Peruvian guest-stars. However, this show lasted briefly before being cancelled when the whole journalist and reporting team of the show left Miyashiro to work alongside Ortiz in a new TV project.

== Bibliography ==
- Maldita Ternura (novel), Alfaguara 2004
- Grandes Sobras (chronicles), Paradero Editores 2006
- Pequeñas Infidencias (letters), Estruendo Mudo 2007
- Mis Pequeños Vandalos (book of literature for teenagers), 2007
- Por favor no me beses (compilation of prose), Editorial Planeta 2009
- Soy el Hombre de mi Vida, Editorial Planeta 2010

== Journalistic Experience ==
- August 2001 to the present "Peru 21" Newspaper Columnist
- 2002 Frecuencia Latina. TV Channel 2. Host, writer and director of "Secret Lives" - Vidas Secretas (Series of biographic documentaries)
- 2002 Frecuencia Latina. TV Channel 2. Host and director of a live late night show, "God deliver us from Beto Ortiz" - Dios Nos libre de Beto Ortiz
- 2001 Frecuencia Latina. TV Channel 2. Host and director of a live late night show, "Nobody sleeps… with Beto Ortiz" - Nadie se duerma... con Beto Ortiz
- 2000 Canal A Producciones. Channel 11. Host and director of a live political talk show, "Beto A Saber" (Spanish play on words between "Go figure" or "You, find out for yourself" and "Beto to Know")
- 1999 "Somos" weekly magazine interviews.
- 1996-1999 America Televisión. TV reporter "La Revista Dominical" news show
- 1996 "Rumbos" Travel magazine editor
- 1993-1996 Panamericana Televisión. TV reporter "Panorama" news show.
- 1995 "El Mundo" Newspaper. Columnist.
- 1991-1993 "Caretas" Magazine Staff writer.
- 1990 "The San Diego Union" newspaper guest writer
- 1990 "Pagina Libre" staff writer
- 1989 Andina Television. TV Reporter "Esta Noche" news show
- 1989 "El Comercio" newspaper. Staff writer (police beat, arts and leisure)

== Education ==
- 1985-1990 University of Lima Faculty of Journalism, Radio, TV and Film (No degree)
- 1990 Tufts University, International Journalism Exchange Program, The Fletcher School of Law and Diplomacy
- 2003 San Antonio de los Baños Film School Screenwriters workshop.

== Awards ==
- Paris, France, 1995, UNESCO (UN Cultural Fund), Gold Medal at the Port de Bouc International Festival of Young Journalists. Awarded for "Children of chaos", a documentary about street children in Lima, Peru.
- Lima, 1994, "The 1,000-word short story", literary contest.
- Lima, 1994, "Citizens for Peace" award for journalistic excellence. Given by the legal bar of Lima.
- Lima, 1993, UNICEF (UN Children's Fund), first prize in journalistic contest awarded for "Not for all the gold in the world", a documentary on child slavery in gold mines in Peru.
- Boston, 1990, The American Society of Newspaper Editors (ASNE), Tufts University Fellowship.
