= Allan Wagner Tizón =

Peruvian diplomat and politician

Allan Wagner OSP
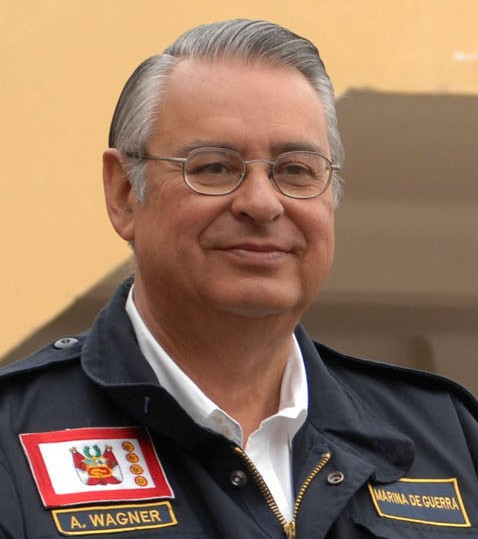

Minister of Foreign Affairs
- In office 15 February 2021 – 29 July 2021
- President: Francisco Sagasti
- Prime Minister: Violeta Bermúdez
- Preceded by: Elizabeth Astete
- Succeeded by: Héctor Béjar
- In office 12 July 2002 – 15 December 2003
- President: Alejandro Toledo
- Prime Minister: Luis Solari; Beatriz Merino
- Preceded by: Diego García Sayán
- Succeeded by: Manuel Rodríguez Cuadros
- In office 28 July 1985 – 13 May 1988
- President: Alan García
- Prime Minister: Luis Alva Castro; Guillermo Larco Cox
- Preceded by: Luis Pércovich Roca
- Succeeded by: Luis Gonzales Posada

Ambassador of Peru to the Netherlands
- In office 7 February 2008 – 15 April 2014
- Preceded by: Gilbert Chauny de Porturas-Hoyle
- Succeeded by: Carlos Andrés Herrera Rodríguez

Minister of Defense
- In office 28 July 2006 – 20 December 2007
- President: Alan García
- Prime Minister: Jorge Del Castillo
- Preceded by: Marciano Rengifo Ruiz
- Succeeded by: Ántero Flores Aráoz

Ambassador of Peru to the United States
- In office 17 February 2001 – 12 July 2002
- Preceded by: Carlos Alzamora Traverso
- Succeeded by: Roberto Dañino

Ambassador of Peru to Venezuela
- In office 1990–1992
- Preceded by: Jorge Raygada Cauvi
- Succeeded by: Eduardo Raygada Morzán

Personal details
- Born: Edward Allan Wagner Tizón; 7 February 1942 (age 84) Lima, Peru
- Party: Independent
- Spouse: Julia de la Guerra Urquiaga
- Children: 5
- Education: National University of Engineering; National University of Trujillo; Pontifical Catholic University of Peru; Diplomatic Academy of Peru (BA)
- Occupation: Diplomat

Allan Wagner or Edward Allan Wagner-Tizón (born February 7, 1942) is a Peruvian diplomat who has served three times as his country's Minister of Foreign Affairs from 1985 to 1990, 2002 to 2003, and also in 2021. He also served as Peru's Minister of Defense from 2006 to 2007.

In 2008, he was Peru's representative before the International Court of Justice in the case concerning delimitation of its maritime borders with Chile.

== Early life and education ==
Wagner-Tizon was born in 1942, the son of Carlos Adolfo Wagner-Vizcarra and María Antonieta Tizón-Ponce.

He completed his primary studies at the Marist School of San Isidro (Colegio Maristas de San Isidro) and high school at the Great Ignacio Merino de Talara School Unit. He then studied chemical engineering at the National University of Engineering, as well as at the National University of Trujillo from 1959 to 1962. He also studied humanities at the Pontifical Catholic University of Peru from 1963 to 1964.

== Career ==
Wagner began his career at the Ministry of Foreign Affairs on May 2, 1963 where he earned a position of Assistant (5th class) following competitive public exams.

He later oversaw Peru’s participation in the General Agreement on Customs Tariffs and Trade, traveling to Switzerland to train in international trade negotiations.

He became Minister of Foreign Affairs in 1985 in the Alan Garcia government, serving until 1990. In February 1986, Wagner and the economic minister, Luis Alva Castro, met with the IMF in Washington, DC to discuss the latter's threats to declare Peru ineligible for further borrowings unless it paid $75 million in overdue payments. The same week, he was one of eight Latin American foreign ministers who met with US Secretary of State, George Shultz, to ask the United States to stop supporting Nicaraguan rebels and to engage in talks with the governing Sandanistas.

In 1992, Wagner Tizon was Peruvian Ambassador to Venezuela. He resigned in protest when the Peruvian legislature was dissolved, the constitution was suspended, and the president, Alberto Fujimori, called a state of emergency.

In 1995, Wagner was serving as director of development of organisation Sistema Económico Latinoamericano (SELA) concerned with the implications of the TRIP agreement for Latin America.

In 1998, as foreign minister, Wagner signed a petition asking the UN to work towards liberalisation of drug laws.

Wagner was sworn in again as foreign minister in 2002 by President Alejandro Toledo, a role he held until 2003.

Wagner participated in various meetings that led to the signing of the Cartagena Agreement and the creation of the Andean Group (today's Andean Community of Nations). He served as secretary-general of the community from 2004 to 2006.

Wagner also served as Minister of Defense of Peru from 2006 to 2007. In 2007, he hosted US Defence Secretary Robert Gates and tried to downplay concerns that the US was looking for a home for an air force base in Peru in the face of widespread public disapproval.

In 2008, he was Peru's representative before the International Court of Justice in a case concerning delimitation of its maritime borders with Chile.

In 2018, he was appointed to head up a commission to provide recommendations for judicial reform.

== See also ==
- Andean Community

Political offices
Preceded by Luis Pércovich	Peruvian Minister of Foreign Affairs; 1985–1988	Succeeded by Luis Gonzáles Posada
Preceded by Diego García Sayán	Peruvian Minister of Foreign Affairs; 2002–2003	Succeeded by Manuel Rodríguez Cuadros
Preceded by Marciano Rengifo Ruiz	Peruvian Minister of Defense; 2006–2007	Succeeded by Ántero Flores Aráoz
Preceded by Elizabeth Astete	Peruvian Minister of Foreign Affairs; 2021	Succeeded by Héctor Béjar
Diplomatic posts
Preceded by Carlos Alzamora Traverso	Ambassador of Peru to the United States; 2001–2002	Succeeded by Roberto Dañino
Preceded by Gilbert Chauny de Porturas-Hoyle	Ambassador of Peru to the Netherlands; 2008–2014	Succeeded by Carlos Andrés Herrera Rodríguez
