= Roberto Dañino =

Peruvian lawyer and politician

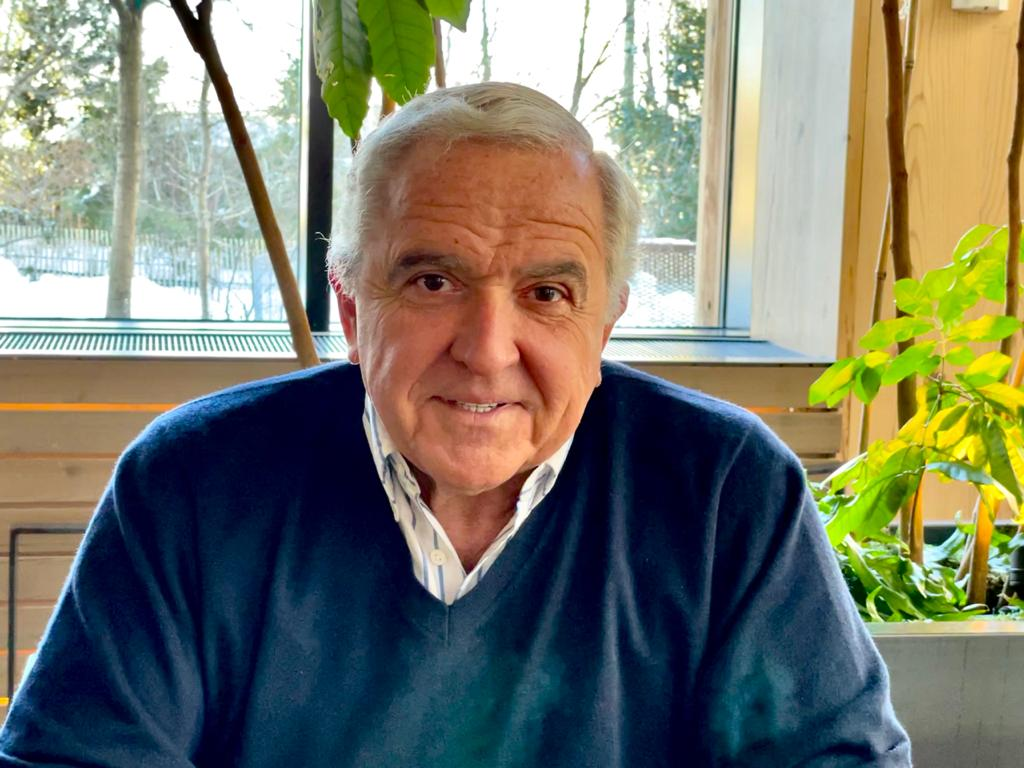

Prime Minister of Peru
- In office 28 July 2001 – 12 July 2002
- President: Alejandro Toledo
- Preceded by: Javier Pérez de Cuéllar
- Succeeded by: Luis Solari De La Fuente

Ambassador of Peru to United States
- In office 9 December 2002 – 31 October 2003
- Preceded by: Allan Wagner Tizón
- Succeeded by: Eduardo Ferrero Costa

Personal details
- Born: 2 March 1951 (age 75) Lima, Peru
- Party: Independent
- Spouse: Pauline Beck (m. 1980)
- Education: Pontifical Catholic University of Peru (LLB); Harvard University (LLM)

Roberto Dañino (born 2 March 1951) is a Peruvian lawyer who was a former Prime Minister of Peru. He was also the Peruvian Ambassador to the United States and the Senior Vice President and General Counsel of The World Bank. He has practiced corporate law for several decades and was the Chairman of the Latin American practice of leading law firms in the United States and Perú. He has also served on the boards of various corporations and nonprofit organizations in Peru, the United States, Canada, South Africa, Spain, and the United Kingdom. Currently, he is a member of various corporate boards and philanthropic entities in Peru and the USA. He is also a member of the international advisory boards of Goldman Sachs, NTT Data, Albright Stonebridge Group and Inversiones Centenario. He was awarded the Order of the Sun of Peru (Gran Cruz) in 2003, which is the highest honor bestowed on a Peruvian citizen.

== Biography ==
=== Education ===
Roberto Dañino earned his law degrees from Harvard Law School and the Catholic University of Peru. He is also an alumnus of the Georgetown University International Leadership Program.

=== Public service ===
In 2001, Dañino was nominated to be the Prime Minister of Peru. Unlike other countries, the Prime Minister of Peru is not chosen by the electorate, but by the President, before then being ratified by Congress. During his tenure, he led the negotiation of the Acuerdo Nacional, which was a plan to unite the main political parties and leading civil organizations. This was with the aim of agreeing on 30 long-term public policies, all of which would be observed for twenty years after the agreement was signed. The agreement was signed on July 22, 2002, ten days after Dañino left office to become the Ambassador of Peru to the United States. And still remains in force having made a positive impact in the long term stability of the rules applicable to private investment in Perú. Thereafter, as Ambassador to the US, his primary focus was on the promotion of a Bilateral Free Trade Agreement between Peru and the US, which eventually was executed during the Alan Garcia administration. He left this role in 2003 to become Senior Vice President and General Counsel of the World Bank and Secretary General of ICSID.

In 1980, when Fernando Belaunde was re-elected as President of Peru after 11 years of military rule, the then Prime Minister, Manuel Ulloa, designated Dañino, who was then 29 years old, as Secretary General of the Ministry of Economy, Finance and Trade. Ulloa later gave him additional responsibilities, appointing him President of the Foreign Investment Committee (CONITE), Chairman of the Public Debt Commission and Director of CONASEV, the securities regulatory agency. Ulloa and his team led Peru into one of Latin America's first efforts to adopt an open market economy. However, the Mexico debt crisis, the insurgence of the terrorist movement Shining Path and internal political squabbles led Ulloa and his team to leave government in December 1982. His successor, Carlos Rodriguez Pastor, attempted to continue the liberalization process but was promptly dismissed by President Belaunde; thereafter the country endured a full decade of political and economic crisis. Ulloa became President of the Senate and Dañino returned to law practice in Lima and later in the United States.

=== Professional career ===
Prior to Dañino's inclusion within the Peruvian government, he practiced law in Peru with Barrios, Fuentes & Urquiaga. In 1989 he became the first General Counsel of the InterAmerican Investment Corporation (now BID Invest), the private sector affiliate of the InterAmerican Development Bank in Washington, D.C. He left IIC in 1993 to practice law in New York with Rogers and Wells and in 1996 he and his latinamerican team moved to the Washington law firm Wilmer Cutler & Pickering, which is now known as Wilmer Hale. At both firms he was an equity partner and Chairman of the Latin American Practice Group. In 2001 he left private practice to join the Peruvian government.

In 2003, after leaving the role of Peruvian Ambassador to the United States, Dañino became the Senior Vice President and General Counsel of the World Bank Group. While in this role he led, among others, the development of the legal framework for the inclusion of human rights in the agenda of the Bank. During his tenure, he was also the Secretary-General of the International Centre for Settlement of Investment Disputes, which arbitrates disputes between governments and international investors. Furthermore, he was also the legal advisor to the Board of Directors and its Ethics Committee.

In 2003 he was awarded the Order of the Sun of Peru (Gran Cruz), which is the highest honor bestowed on a Peruvian citizen. He has also received the Orden de Isabel la Catolica from the King of Spain and the Medal for Distinguished Alumnus from the Ponticia Universidad Catolica del Peru. In 2004 Dañino received the Annual Award from the American Foreign Law Association for his work in the legal field. He was the first Peruvian to receive this honor from the organization.

Dr. Dañino left the World Bank in 2006 to become the Deputy Chairman of the Board of Hochschild Mining plc. Hochschild Mining then became the first Latin American company to list itself on the London Stock Exchange in over one hundred years. He was also Deputy Chairman of Cementos Pacasmayo, which, under his tenure, was listed in the New York Stock Exchange (CPAC) and Chairman of the Board of Fosfatos del Pacífico (FOSPAC) which is a joint venture between Pacasmayo and Mitsubishi Corporation.

Dr. Dañino is currently a Director of NTT Data, AFP integra, Inversiones Centenario. He is also a Regional Advisor for Goldmand Sachs, and as well for the Albright Stonebridge Group.

In addition, he belongs to various philanthropic organizations including Transparencia, Fundación Internacional para la Libertad (FIL), Human Rights Watch, and MALI (the Art Museum of Lima). He has also been a board member of ACCION International, LUMNI (Perú), Results for Development (R4D), and the Youth Orchestra of the America.

Political offices
Preceded by Javier Pérez de Cuéllar	Prime Minister of Peru; 2001 – 2002	Succeeded by Luis Solari De La Fuente
