= Violeta Bermúdez =

Prime Minister of Peru from 2020 to 2021

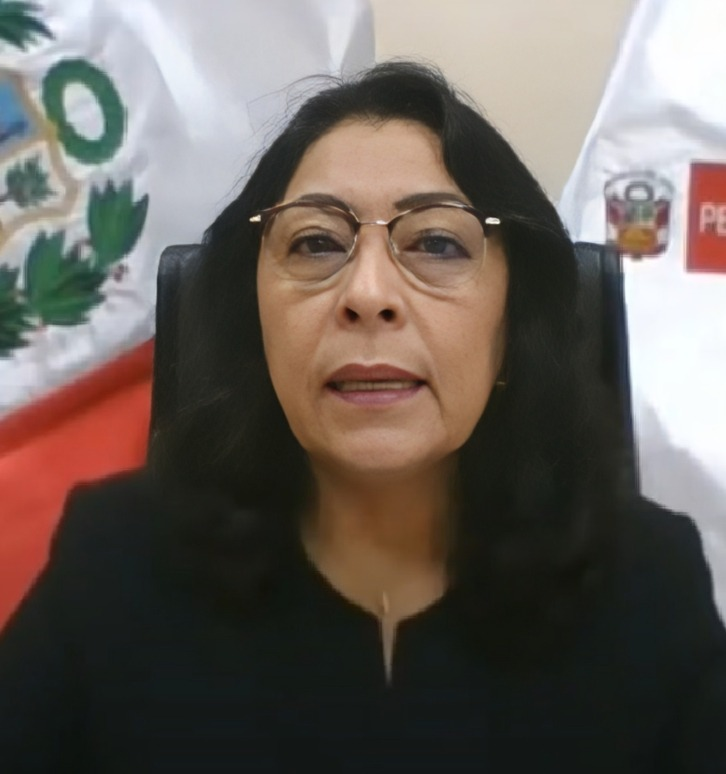
- Bermúdez in 2021

Prime Minister of Peru
- In office 18 November 2020 – 28 July 2021
- President: Francisco Sagasti
- Preceded by: Ántero Flores Aráoz
- Succeeded by: Guido Bellido

Deputy Minister of Women
- In office 24 January 2002 – 1 August 2002
- President: Alejandro Toledo
- Prime Minister: Roberto Dañino; Luis Solari
- Minister: Cecilia Blondet; Ana María Romero-Lozada
- Preceded by: Cecilia Suarez Claros
- Succeeded by: Maria Elizabeth Querol Campos de Arana

Personal details
- Born: Violeta Bermúdez Valdivia; 12 August 1961 (age 64) Lima, Peru
- Party: Independent
- Spouse: Samuel Abad Yupanqui
- Education: National University of San Marcos; Pontifical Catholic University of Peru
- Occupation: Lawyer, writer, diplomat

Violeta Bermúdez Valdivia (born 12 August 1961) is a Peruvian lawyer, writer and diplomat. On 18 November 2020, Bermúdez became the Prime Minister of Peru. Previously, she held positions in the United States Agency for International Development and worked during the cabinets of President Alejandro Toledo and Prime Minister Beatriz Merino.

== Political career ==
From April 1997 to January 2002, she served as the Human Rights Coordinator of the United States Agency for International Development representing Peru.

Bermúdez was appointed Vice-Minister of the Ministry of Women's Promotion and Human Development on 24 January 2002 by President Alejandro Toledo. She had a role in gaining the approval of policies at the Forum of Equity and Social Justice of the National Agreement.

In July 2003, she was Chief of the Cabinet of Advisors to Prime Minister Beatriz Merino. She left the position a few months later in December.

Between 2012 and 2017, she was Director of the Pro-Decentralization Project for the United States Agency for International Development.

=== Prime minister ===
On 18 November 2020, President Francisco Sagasti appointed Bermúdez as Prime Minister of Peru. She replaced Ántero Flores Aráoz following the growing social unrest in the country. She is the fifth woman to hold this position in the country's history.

== Personal life ==
She was born in Lima. Bermúdez studied law at the National University of San Marcos and at the Pontifical Catholic University of Peru.

She is married to lawyer Samuel Abad Yupanqui.

== Publications ==
- La regulación jurídica del aborto en América Latina y el Caribe: estudio comparativo (1998)
- Gender and power. The Political Equality of Women (2019)

Political offices
Preceded by Ántero Flores Aráoz	Prime Minister of Peru; 2020–2021	Succeeded by Guido Bellido
