= Mesías Guevara =

Peruvian politician (born 1963)

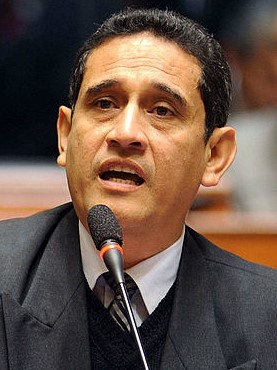
- Mesías Guevara

Governor of Cajamarca
- In office 1 January 2019 – 31 December 2022
- Lieutenant: Angélica Bazán Chavarry
- Preceded by: Porfirio Medina Vásquez
- Succeeded by: Roger Guevara

President of the Regional Governments Assembly of Peru
- In office 18 January 2019 – 21 February 2020
- Preceded by: Luis Valdez Farías
- Succeeded by: Servando García Correa

President of the Popular Action
- In office 30 November 2014 – 13 November 2023
- Preceded by: Javier Alva Orlandini
- Succeeded by: Julio Chávez

General Secretary of the Popular Action
- In office 12 December 2011 – 9 November 2013
- President: Javier Alva Orlandini
- Preceded by: Yonhy Lescano
- Succeeded by: Allen Kessel del Río
- In office 21 September 2007 – 14 November 2009
- President: Víctor Andrés García Belaúnde
- Preceded by: Luis Alberto Velarde
- Succeeded by: Yonhy Lescano

Member of Congress
- In office 26 July 2011 – 26 July 2016
- Constituency: Cajamarca

Personal details
- Born: Mesías Antonio Guevara Amasifuén; 13 June 1963 (age 63) Chiclayo, Lambayeque, Peru
- Party: Popular Action (2004-2023) Purple Party (2024-present)
- Spouse: Blanca Ruiz Meza
- Education: Ricardo Palma University (BS); Peruvian University of Applied Sciences (MBA); University of Seville
- Occupation: Politician
- Profession: Electronic engineer

Mesías Antonio Guevara Amasifuén (born 13 June 1963) is a Peruvian politician and engineer. A former member of the Popular Action party, he served as the party's president from 2014 to 2023. He was previously a Congressman, representing Cajamarca between 2011 and 2016 and served as governor of Cajamarca from 2019 to 2022.

== Early life and education ==
Guevara was born in the northern city of Chiclayo to a middle-class family on 13 June 1963. Upon completing his elementary education at an Adventist education in Jaén, Cajamarca, he was enrolled in the Elías Aguirre Military School of Chiclayo, from which he graduated in 1983 with a specialty in mechanics.

In 1987, he graduated as an electronic engineer from the Ricardo Palma University in Lima. In 2001, he completed a master's degree in administration at the Peruvian University of Applied Sciences. In addition, he holds a diploma in Advanced Studies from the University of Seville, from which he is currently a business administration doctoral candidate.

== Academic and management career ==
Within his academic experience, Guevara served as Director of the Professional Academic School of Electronic Engineering of the Ricardo Palma University. In addition, he served as a lecturer at the graduate schools of the National University of San Marcos, Peruvian Union University, and the Federico Villarreal National University.

Guevara also managed companies such as Singular S.A, a Peruvian consulting company in Business Management and Telecommunications; ECI TELECOM IBERICA and AMPER PERU, Spanish telecommunications companies. He also served as general manager of the Lucent Technologies company (Peru chapter).

== Political career ==
=== Early political career ===
Guevara entered politics as he joined the Popular Action in 2004. At first, he was chosen to run for a seat in the Andean Parliament at the 2006 general election under the Centre Front coalition, but he was not elected. The same year, he ran for the first time for Governor of Cajamarca, garnering 6% of the vote and was once again not elected. Four years later, he ran for a second time, with 5% of the vote and was once again not elected.

=== Congressman (2011–2016) ===
As the Possible Peru Alliance was established for the 2011 general election, Guevara was selected to run for the Peruvian Congress, representing the Cajamarca region. Attaining 18,041 votes and as the coalition placed third in the region, he was elected as one of the five congressmen from the Popular Action party in Congress.

During his term, he remained an adamant voice against congressional reelection, for which he submitting a bill for amending the Constitution of Peru in order to rule-out immediate congressional reelection. His bill was ultimately rejected by the Constitution committee. For the next general election cycle, he declined to run for reelection, basing his decision in coherence to the motive of the bill. However, it was approved years later in a 2018 referendum.

=== Party politics ===
At party leadership level, Guevara was elected President of Popular Action for the 2014-2019 term, defeating former Party President Víctor Andrés García Belaúnde and Elías Mendoza Habersperger. He still served in the position after 2019 although his term had expired, as the party was yet to convene a national convention to elect a new party leadership. He was previously, the General Secretary of the Popular Action from 2007 to 2009 and again from 2011 to 2013. He resigned from the party in November 2023. He joined the Purple Party in January 2024.

=== Presidential nomination run (2015) ===
For the 2016 general election, Guevara announced his candidacy for President of Peru. At the primary election held on 20 December 2015, former Congressman Alfredo Barnechea won the presidential nomination with 52.1% of the vote, defeating Guevara who attained 41.5% of the vote.

=== Governor of Cajamarca (2019-2022) ===
In the 2018 Peruvian regional and municipal elections, Guevara ran for the third time for Governor of Cajamarca. In the first round, he placed second with 21.3% of the vote behind Walter Benavides Gavidia of the Alliance for Progress and ahead of incumbent Governor Walter Benavides Gavidia. In the run-off, he defeated Benavides Gavida with 61.4% of the vote.

At the start of his governorship in January 2019, he was elected President of the National Assembly of Regional Governments, with the support of President Martín Vizcarra and Prime Minister César Villanueva.

During Martín Vizcarra's administration, Guevara remained a strong supporter of the president at regional level. In the aftermath of Vizcarra's removal and the start of the protests in November 2020, he remained a strong critic of Manuel Merino's ascension to the presidency. As Popular Action leader, he disavowed Vizcarra's removal and Merino's role, siding with former Congressman Yonhy Lescano in not approving his party's congressional caucus' decision. He also called for Merino’s resignation as President alongside Lima Mayor Jorge Muñoz.
