= José Sabogal District =

Coordinates: 7.2829°S 78.0140°W

José Sabogal
- District
- Interactive map of José Sabogal
- Country: Peru
- Region: Cajamarca
- Province: San Marcos
- Founded: December 11, 1982
- Capital: Venecia

Government
  - Mayor: Amado Marin Davila

Area
  - Total: 594.31 km^{2} (229.46 sq mi)
- Elevation: 3,075 m (10,089 ft)

Population (2005 census)
  - Total: 14,581
  - Density: 24.534/km^{2} (63.544/sq mi)
- Time zone: UTC-5 (PET)
- UBIGEO: 061007

Church of San Juan Bautista

José Sabogal District is one of seven districts of the province San Marcos in Peru.
