= Pedro Gálvez District =

Coordinates: 7.3315°S 78.1686°W

Pedro Gálvez
- District
- Interactive map of Pedro Gálvez
- Country: Peru
- Region: Cajamarca
- Province: San Marcos
- Capital: San Marcos

Government
  - Mayor: Flavio Carlos Machuca Romero

Area
  - Total: 238.74 km^{2} (92.18 sq mi)
- Elevation: 2,251 m (7,385 ft)

Population (2005 census)
  - Total: 17,109
  - Density: 71.664/km^{2} (185.61/sq mi)
- Time zone: UTC-5 (PET)
- UBIGEO: 061001

Pedro Gálvez District is one of seven districts of the province San Marcos in Peru.
