= Peruvian University of Applied Sciences =

Private university in Lima, Peru

- Universidad Peruana de Ciencias Aplicadas
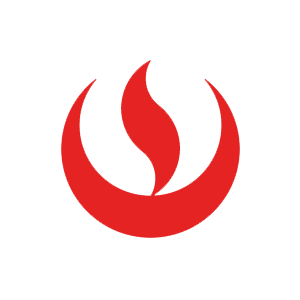
- Other name: UPC
- Motto: Exígete. Innova. UPC.
- Motto in English: Push yourself. Be creative. UPC.
- Type: Private
- Established: January 5, 1994
- Founders: Graciela Bancalari; David Fischman; Alfredo Miró Quesada; Mariana Rodríguez
- Affiliations: Laureate International Universities
- Rector: Dr. Edward Roekaert Embrechts
- Academic staff: 3,336 (2017)
- Students: 82,228 (2021)
- Undergraduates: 64,767
- Postgraduates: 17,461
- Location: Av. Prolongación Primavera 2390, Los Álamos de Monterrico, Santiago de Surco, Lima, Peru; 12.1041°S 76.9630°W
- Campus: Urban Monterrico Campus: 3 hectares (7.4 acres)
- Colors: Gray; Red
- Nickname: UPC
- Website: www.upc.edu.pe

The Universidad Peruana de Ciencias Aplicadas (UPC) is a private university in Lima, Peru, founded on January 5, 1994. Currently, it offers 46 career programs categorized in 13 schools.

== History ==
The Universidad Peruana de Ciencias Aplicadas was created by Law No. 26276 on January 5, 1994. On March 28, a ceremony took place in the campus of Santiago de Surco in Lima, where the first stone was placed. The first admission was on August 4, 1994, and on September 15, the first university courses started with the faculties of engineering, architecture and communications.

In March 1995, the university held a debate called "Creatividad Presidencial" (Presidential Creativity) between Javier Pérez de Cuéllar and Alberto Fujimori. In that same year, a new system of admission called Selección Preferente was created, for those students who had finished high school in the upper third ranking of their classes.

In 1996, the faculty of business management was created, containing programs in finance, marketing and accounting. In the same year, pavilion B was founded.

In 1997, the Escuela de Negocios de la UPC (Business School of UPC) is founded. It is now known as Escuela de Postgrado de la UPC. In 1998, the faculty of law was founded while in 2000, the faculty of economics.

In September 2004, the university affiliated with the network of private ue universities called Laureate International Universities. The next year, the university created the División de Estudios Profesionales para Ejecutivos, which connected into one single program the Programa de Eduación Superior Complementaria, which was focused on graduates of college.

In 2006, the faculties of health, humanities and hotel administration. In 2009, the faculty of arts and music were founded.

In 2011, the faculty of design was created and the first year of classes at the San Isidro campus was inaugurated. The following year the faculty of education was created and the first academic year of undergraduate at the Villa campus was inaugurated; and in 2015, the San Miguel campus is inaugurated and the psychology faculty is created.

== Campuses ==
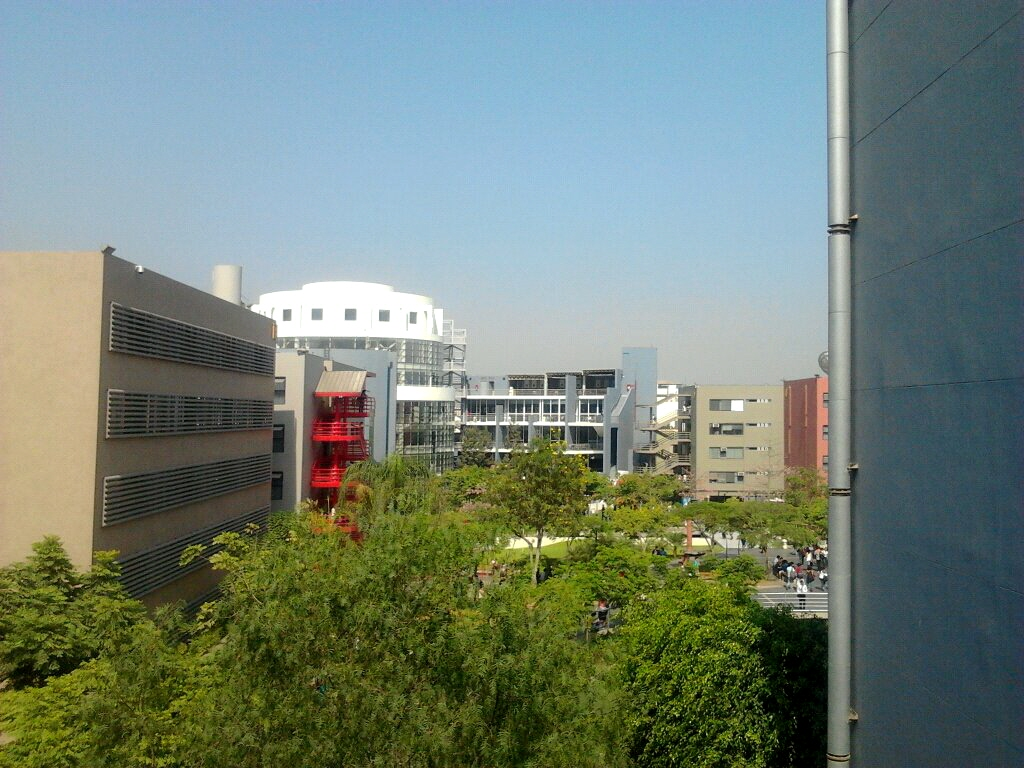
Interior of the Monterrico Campus

The Universidad Peruana de Ciencias Aplicadas has a main campus in Santiago de Surco, Lima, Peru. It is known as el Campus Monterrico, which has a size of 3 hectares. Another campus was built in San Isidro, Lima, Peru. This campus is known as the "San Isidro campus". In 2013, the Villa campus (in the district of Chorrillos) was purchased. In 2015, the San Miguel campus was purchased, which is located in the district of San Miguel in Lima, Peru. The Villa campus has several sectors dedicated to sports.

Previously, UPC had its postgraduate school in the Independencia district, but due to licensing by SUNEDU and for an incident that occurred in February 2017, it had to close.

== Faculties ==
There are 13 faculties in the university:

- Administration in Hospitality and Tourism,
- Architecture,
- Contemporary Arts,
- Health Sciences,
- Human Sciences,
- Communications,
- Law,
- Design,
- Economy,
- Education,
- Engineering,
- Business,
- Psychology

== Notable alumni and academics ==
- George Forsyth: Peruvian-Chilean soccer player, businessman and politician. Former candidate for president in 2021 elections.
- Luis Castañeda Pardo: Peruvian Politician and Lima councilor from 2011 to 2013.
- Anna Carina Copello: Peruvian pop singer.
- Pedro del Rosario: Politician and ex mayor of Los Olivos District.
- Mesías Guevara: Politician and president of Acción Popular Party.
