= Chancay District, San Marcos =

Coordinates: 7.3883°S 78.1238°W

Chancay
- District
- Interactive map of Chancay
- Country: Peru
- Region: Cajamarca
- Province: San Marcos
- Founded: November 16, 1992
- Capital: Chancay

Government
  - Mayor: Fernando Luis Valqui Tapia

Area
  - Total: 61.8 km^{2} (23.9 sq mi)
- Elevation: 2,670 m (8,760 ft)

Population (2005 census)
  - Total: 3,303
  - Density: 53.4/km^{2} (138/sq mi)
- Time zone: UTC-5 (PET)
- UBIGEO: 061002

Chancay District is one of seven districts of the province San Marcos in Peru.
