= José Manuel Quiroz District =

Coordinates: 7.3284°S 78.0328°W

José Manuel Quiroz
- District
- Interactive map of José Manuel Quiroz
- Country: Peru
- Region: Cajamarca
- Province: San Marcos
- Founded: December 11, 1982
- Capital: Shirac

Government
  - Mayor: Santos Gabino Espinoza Muñoz

Area
  - Total: 115.42 km^{2} (44.56 sq mi)
- Elevation: 2,750 m (9,020 ft)

Population (2005 census)
  - Total: 4,116
  - Density: 35.66/km^{2} (92.36/sq mi)
- Time zone: UTC-5 (PET)
- UBIGEO: 061006

José Manuel Quiroz District is one of seven districts of the province San Marcos in Peru.
