= Gregorio Pita District =

Coordinates: 7.2726°S 78.1757°W

Gregorio Pita
- District
- Interactive map of Gregorio Pita
- Country: Peru
- Region: Cajamarca
- Province: San Marcos
- Founded: December 11, 1982
- Capital: Paucamarca

Government
  - Mayor: Joel Abanto Alcalde

Area
  - Total: 212.81 km^{2} (82.17 sq mi)
- Elevation: 2,675 m (8,776 ft)

Population (2005 census)
  - Total: 7,642
  - Density: 35.91/km^{2} (93.01/sq mi)
- Time zone: UTC-5 (PET)
- UBIGEO: 061004

Gregorio Pita District is one of seven districts of the province San Marcos in Peru.
