= Ichocán District =

Coordinates: 7.3683°S 78.1329°W

Ichocan
- District
- Interactive map of Ichocan
- Country: Peru
- Region: Cajamarca
- Province: San Marcos
- Capital: Ichocán

Government
  - Mayor: Enrique Saul Ruiz Lezama

Area
  - Total: 76.11 km^{2} (29.39 sq mi)
- Elevation: 2,596 m (8,517 ft)

Population (2005 census)
  - Total: 2,494
  - Density: 32.77/km^{2} (84.87/sq mi)
- Time zone: UTC-5 (PET)
- UBIGEO: 061005

Ichocan District is one of seven districts of the province San Marcos in Peru.
