= Opinion polling for the 2016 Peruvian general election =

Opinion polling for the Peruvian General election, 2016

Since the previous elections in 2011, polling companies have published surveys tracking voting intention for the 2016 Peruvian general election. The results of these surveys are listed below in reverse chronological order. The first round of the election was held on 10 April, and the run-off between Keiko Fujimori and Pedro Pablo Kuczynski was held on 5 June 2016.

== Opinion polls ==
=== Presidential election ===
The following graph shows the weighted polls

View source data.

| Pollster | Date | Respondents | Keiko Fujimori | Pedro Pablo Kuczynski | Verónika Mendoza | Alfredo Barnechea | Alan García | Gregorio Santos | Alejandro Toledo | Julio Guzmán | César Acuña | Daniel Urresti | Other | Blank/None | Undecided |
|---|---|---|---|---|---|---|---|---|---|---|---|---|---|---|---|
| 2016 general elections | 10 April 2016 | N/A | 39.9 | 21.1 | 18.7 | 7 | 5.8 | 4 | 1.3 | N/A | N/A | N/A | 3.5 | N/A | N/A |
| Ipsos Perú/El Comercio | 30 March–1 April 2016 | 1,781 | 33 | 16 | 15 | 8 | 5 | 2 | 1 | - | - | - | 2 | 10 | 8 |
| CPI/Correo | 30 March–1 April 2016 | 1,800 | 37.3 | 15.4 | 13.7 | 8.3 | 6.2 | 3.2 | 1.1 | - | - | - | 1.2 | 8.8 | 4.7 |
| Datum/Gestión/Perú 21 | 28–30 March 2016 | 1,781 | 36 | 17 | 15 | 10 | 4 | 2 | 1 | - | - | - | 2 | 4 | 9 |
| GFK/La República | 28–30 March 2016 | 1,828 | 35 | 16.1 | 14 | 9.7 | 5.5 | 2.7 | 0.7 | - | - | - | 0.5 | 9.9 | 5.9 |
| Vox Populi/ATV | 25–29 March 2016 | 1,308 | 31.2 | 14.1 | 10.3 | 12.9 | 5.6 | - | - | - | - | - | 1.8 | 10.6 | 13.6 |
| CPI/Correo | 25–27 March 2016 | 1,308 | 34.6 | 15 | 10.9 | 11.3 | 6 | 1.8 | 1 | - | - | - | 1.9 | 11 | 6.5 |
| Ipsos Perú/El Comercio | 22–24 March 2016 | 1,791 | 32 | 16 | 12 | 11 | 6 | 1 | 2 | - | - | - | 2 | 9 | 9 |
| Datum/Gestión/Perú 21 | 18–20 March 2016 | 1,200 | 34.4 | 17.3 | 10.5 | 13.7 | 4.2 | 1.3 | 0.8 | - | - | - | 2.5 | 10.7 | 4.6 |
| Ipsos Perú/El Comercio | 15–17 March 2016 | 1,792 | 31 | 15 | 12 | 12 | 6 | 2 | 1 | - | - | - | 2 | 9 | 10 |
| CPI/Correo | 13–16 March 2016 | 1,650 | 37.6 | 15.3 | 9.3 | 11.7 | 6.5 | 2.1 | 1.4 | - | - | - | 2 | 9.8 | 4.3 |
| GFK/La República | 11–15 March 2016 | 1,611 | 33.8 | 15.9 | 7.5 | 11.8 | 5.8 | 1.6 | 1.8 | - | - | - | 1.5 | 11 | 9.3 |
| Vox Populi/ATV | 11–14 March 2016 | 1,200 | 33.1 | 9.5 | 7.9 | 12 | 5.8 | 0.5 | 1.3 | - | - | 0.2 | 0.3 | 8.8 | 19.5 |
| JNE | 9–11 March 2016 | Guzmán and Acuña disqualified / Urresti withdrawn | | | | | | | | | | | | | |
| Datum/Gestión/Perú 21 | 6–8 March 2016 | 1,200 | 37 | 14 | 8 | 9 | 7 | 0.8 | 0.8 | - | - | 0.9 | 3.6 | 4 | 14.9 |
| Ipsos Perú/El Comercio | 5–10 March 2016 | 1,851 | 32 | 14 | 9 | 9 | 6 | - | - | - | - | - | 8 | 12 | 10 |
| GFK/La República | 27 February–1 March 2016 | 1,552 | 37.7 | 10.1 | 5.6 | 6.7 | 4.5 | - | 1.7 | - | - | - | 3.4 | 13.1 | 17.2 |
| GFK/La República | 27 February–1 March 2016 | 1,552 | 34.6 | 6.9 | 3.7 | 5.1 | 4.3 | - | 1.6 | 16.6 | 3.6 | - | 2.8 | 8.4 | 12.4 |
| CPI/Correo | 19–23 February 2016 | 1,650 | 37.7 | 6.8 | 4.1 | 3.8 | 6.4 | 1.7 | 1.8 | 18.3 | 7.3 | 1 | 1.5 | 9.2 | 4.4 |
| Ipsos Perú/El Comercio | 13–18 February 2016 | 1,815 | 30 | 9 | 4 | 4 | 5 | - | 2 | 18 | 6 | - | 5 | 8 | 9 |
| Datum/Gestión/Perú 21 | 8–10 February 2016 | 1,200 | 35 | 11 | 2 | 3 | 4 | - | 2 | 17 | 8 | 1 | 3 | 4 | 10 |
| CPI/Correo | 5–9 February 2016 | 1,650 | 34.1 | 7.7 | 2.7 | 2.1 | 6.2 | 1.8 | 2.2 | 14.1 | 12.6 | 1.5 | 4.2 | 7.7 | 3.1 |
| GFK/La República | 22–26 January 2016 | 1,563 | 32.6 | 9.5 | 1.9 | - | 6.5 | - | 2.7 | 10.4 | 10 | 0.9 | 3.4 | 9.5 | 12.6 |
| Ipsos Perú/El Comercio | 12–14 January 2016 | 1,815 | 33 | 13 | 2 | - | 8 | - | 3 | 5 | 13 | 2 | 7 | 6 | 8 |
| CPI/Correo | 9–12 January 2016 | 1,500 | 32.1 | 13.1 | 2.3 | - | 7.2 | - | 3.2 | 5 | 15.2 | 2.2 | 7.5 | 9.1 | 3.1 |
| Datum/Gestión/Perú 21 | 8–11 January 2016 | 1,200 | 35 | 14 | 2 | - | 6 | - | 3 | 4 | 10 | 3 | 5 | 4 | 15 |
| GFK/La República | 11–15 December 2015 | 1,267 | 30 | 11 | 2 | - | 5 | - | 3 | 2 | 8 | 2 | 1 | 17 | 19 |
| CPI/Correo | 7–10 December 2015 | 1,450 | 33.1 | 17.6 | 2.4 | - | 8.2 | - | 4.8 | - | 12.1 | 2.2 | 5 | 10.6 | 4.1 |
| Ipsos Perú/El Comercio | 5–10 December 2015 | 1,846 | 33 | 16 | 2 | 1 | 8 | - | 5 | - | 13 | 2 | 4 | 9 | 7 |
| Datum/Gestión/Perú 21 | 27 November–2 December 2015 | 1,200 | 35 | 14 | 2 | - | 7 | - | 4 | 0.4 | 12 | 0.2 | 2.9 | 17 | 6 |
| GFK/La República | 20–24 November 2015 | 1,365 | 32 | 9 | 1 | - | 6 | - | 3 | 1 | 7 | - | 6 | 19 | 17 |
| Ipsos Perú/El Comercio | 7–13 November 2015 | 1,835 | 34 | 16 | 2 | 1 | 9 | - | 5 | - | 10 | 1 | 5 | 9 | 8 |
| CPI/Correo | 1–5 November 2015 | 1,450 | 33.5 | 17.1 | 2.4 | 1.1 | 7.8 | - | 4.2 | - | 9.8 | 2.1 | 5.7 | 11.7 | 4.6 |
| Datum/Gestión/Perú 21 | 29 October–3 November 2015 | 1,200 | 35 | 19 | 1 | - | 7 | - | 5 | 0.3 | 9 | 0.2 | 2.2 | 13 | 8 |
| GFK/La República | 17–20 October 2015 | 1,308 | 33 | 11 | 1 | - | 8 | - | 3 | - | 4 | 2 | 5 | 17 | 20 |
| Ipsos Perú/El Comercio | 9–14 October 2015 | 1,835 | 34 | 14 | 2 | 1 | 9 | - | 5 | - | 6 | 2 | 13 | 9 | 7 |
| CPI/Correo | 5–9 October 2015 | 1,450 | 32.9 | 15.8 | 1.9 | - | 7.8 | - | 5.3 | - | 3.3 | 3.1 | 12.6 | 11.6 | 5.7 |
| Datum/Gestión/Perú 21 | 1–5 October 2015 | 1,200 | 37 | 18 | 1 | - | 8 | - | 5 | - | 4 | 3 | 4 | 13 | 8 |
| GFK/La República | 19–23 September 2015 | 1,305 | 34 | 12 | 0.5 | - | 6 | - | 4 | - | 3 | 2 | 5.5 | 17 | 14 |
| Datum/Gestión/Perú 21 | 6–10 September 2015 | 1,200 | 36 | 16 | 1 | - | 7 | 1 | 5 | 0.6 | 4 | 3 | 4 | 12.4 | 10 |
| CPI/Correo | 23–28 August 2015 | 1,450 | 34.2 | 14.7 | 1.9 | - | 8 | - | 5.8 | - | 3.6 | 3.6 | 15.6 | 10.8 | 3.8 |
| Datum/Gestión/Perú 21 | 3–7 August 2015 | 1,200 | 34 | 17 | - | - | 6 | - | 3 | - | 4 | 5 | 9 | 12 | 10 |
| GFK/La República | 18–23 July 2015 | 1,319 | 31 | 12 | - | - | 8 | 1 | 4 | - | 3 | 2 | 9 | 17 | 13 |
| Datum/Gestión/Perú 21 | 22–23 July 2015 | 1,200 | 33 | 17 | - | - | 9 | 2 | 5 | - | 3 | 3 | 2 | 4 | 20 |
| Ipsos Perú/El Comercio | 11–16 July 2015 | 1,839 | 33 | 15 | - | - | 11 | 1 | 5 | - | 4 | 3 | 15 | 8 | 5 |

=== Parliamentary election ===
The following graph shows the weighted polls.

View source data.

| Pollster | Date | Respondents | Popular Force | Peruvians for Change | Broad Front | Alliance for the Progress of Peru | Popular Alliance | Popular Action | Direct Democracy | Possible Peru | Peruvian Nationalist Party | All for Peru | National Solidarity-UPP Alliance | Other | Blank/None | Undecided |
|---|---|---|---|---|---|---|---|---|---|---|---|---|---|---|---|---|
| 2016 general elections | 10 April 2016 | N/A | 36.3 | 16.5 | 13.9 | 9.2 | 8.3 | 7.2 | 4.3 | 2.4 | N/A | N/A | N/A | 1.8 | N/A | N/A |
| Ipsos Perú/El Comercio | 30 March-1 April 2016 | 1,800 | 25 | 13 | 10.5 | 5.6 | 6.1 | 5.7 | 1 | 1.2 | - | - | 1.1 | 0.7 | 30.1 | N/A |
| Ipsos Perú/El Comercio | 22-24 March 2016 | 1,734 | 24.5 | 12.9 | 7.5 | 3.8 | 6 | 6.1 | 1.2 | 1.5 | - | - | 1.8 | 4 | 33.6 | N/A |
| Ipsos Perú/El Comercio | 15–17 March 2016 | 1,792 | 18 | 11 | 4 | 7 | 5 | 9 | 1 | 3 | - | - | 2 | 4 | 12 | 24 |
| CPI/Correo | 13–16 March 2016 | 1,650 | 26.6 | 11.6 | 5.3 | 7.2 | 6.1 | 6 | 1.7 | 1.8 | - | - | 1.8 | 0.9 | 9.9 | 21 |
| GFK/La República | 11–15 March 2016 | 1,611 | 21.5 | 10.2 | 3 | 4.3 | 6.4 | 7.3 | - | - | - | - | - | 8.5 | 9.4 | 29.4 |
| GFK/La República | 27 February–1 March 2016 | 1,552 | 22.7 | 5.5 | 2.2 | 4.6 | 5 | 3.6 | - | 1.6 | - | 6.3 | 1.1 | 3.1 | 10.3 | 34 |
| CPI/Correo | 19–23 February 2016 | 1,650 | 24.1 | 7.3 | 2.9 | 7.4 | 7.5 | 2.9 | - | 1.8 | 1.1 | 7.1 | - | 3.6 | 15.8 | 18.4 |
| Ipsos Perú/El Comercio | 13–18 February 2016 | 1,815 | 17 | 10 | 2 | 8 | 6 | 6 | - | 2 | 2 | 7 | - | | 6 | 29 |
| Ipsos Perú/El Comercio | 12–14 January 2016 | 1,815 | 19 | 9 | - | 10 | 8 | 3 | - | 4 | 3 | 4 | 2 | 7 | 8 | 23 |
| Ipsos Perú/El Comercio | 5–10 December 2015 | 1,846 | 21 | 12 | - | - | 7 | 3 | - | 4 | 3 | - | - | 21 | 8 | 21 |
| Ipsos Perú/El Comercio | 7–13 November 2015 | 1,835 | 19 | 10 | - | - | 8 | 3 | - | 4 | 3 | - | - | 21 | 10 | 22 |
| Ipsos Perú/El Comercio | 9–14 October 2015 | 1,835 | 20 | 12 | - | - | 7 | 4 | - | 5 | 4 | - | - | 20 | 9 | 19 |
