= Yonhy Lescano =

Peruvian lawyer and politician

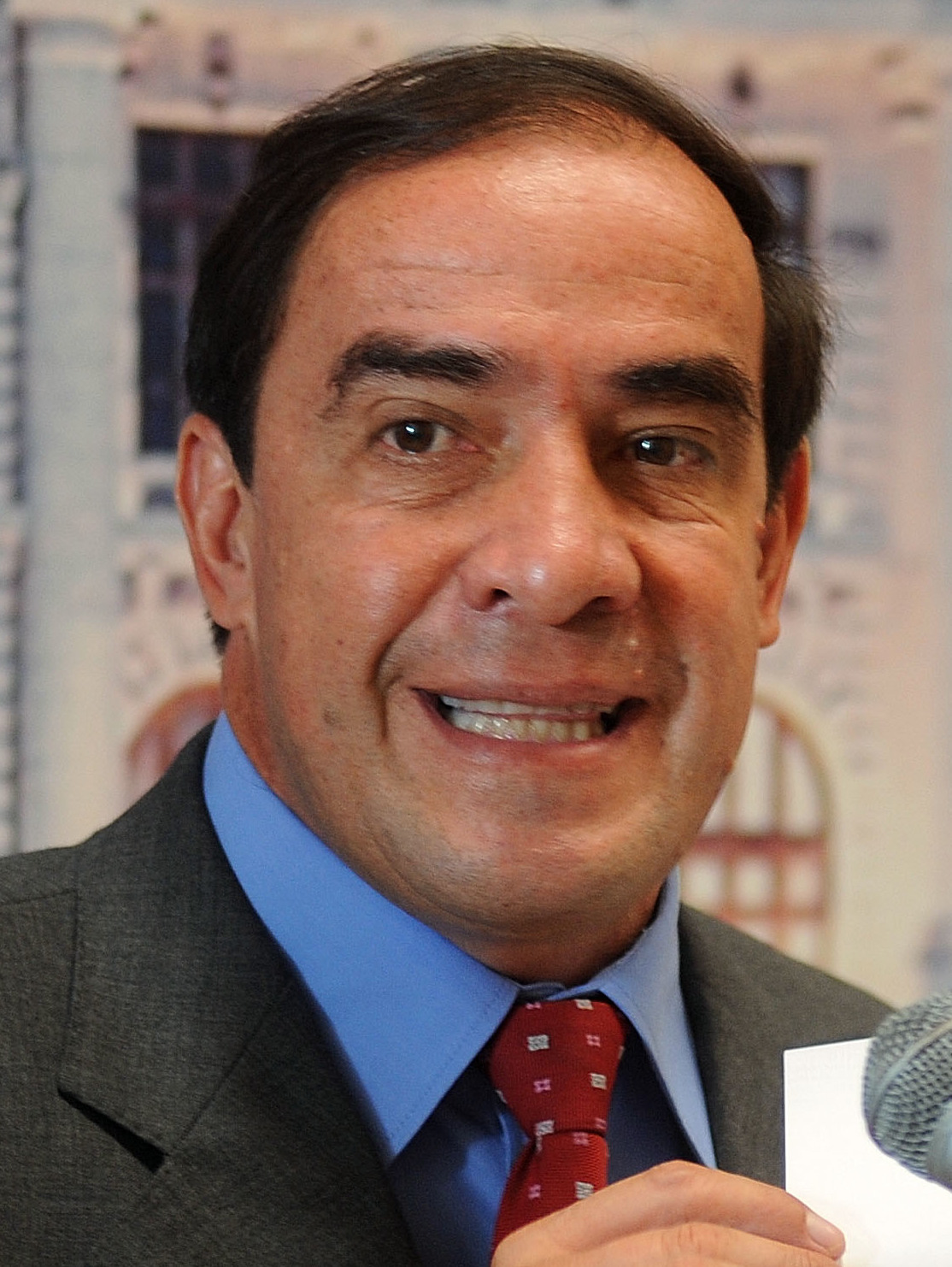
- Yonhy Lescano in 2012

Member of Congress
- In office 26 July 2001 – 30 September 2019
- Constituency: Puno (2001–2011); Lima (2011–2019)

General Secretary of the Popular Action
- In office 14 November 2009 – 12 November 2011
- President: Javier Alva Orlandini
- Preceded by: Mesías Guevara
- Succeeded by: Mesías Guevara

Personal details
- Born: Yonhy Lescano Ancieta; 15 February 1959 (age 67) Puno, Peru
- Party: Popular Action (2000-2023)
- Other political affiliations: National Solidarity (2000); Independent (until 2000)
- Spouse: Patricia Contador (m. 1986)
- Children: 3
- Education: Catholic University of Santa María (LLB); University of Chile (LLM)
- Occupation: Lawyer
- Profession: Politician

Yonhy Lescano Ancieta (born 15 February 1959) is a Peruvian lawyer and politician belonging to the Popular Action party. He was a Congressman between 2001 until the dissolution of the Congress by Martín Vizcarra in 2019. From 2009 to 2011, he served as the Popular Action party's national secretary-general. He was the Popular Action's presidential nominee in the 2021 general election and placed fifth in an atomized race of 18 nominees.

== Education ==
From 1976 to 1980, Yonhy Lescano studied law at the Catholic University of Santa María in Arequipa. From 1984 to 2001, he worked as an independent lawyer in his own town in Puno. Additionally, he was a professor, lecturing law at the National University of the Altiplano (UNA) in Puno, from 1985 to 2001.

== Political career ==
In the 2000 elections, he ran unsuccessfully for a seat in Congress under Luis Castañeda's National Solidarity.

=== Congressman ===
In the 2001 elections, he was elected as Congressman to represent the Puno Region, on the list of the centrist Popular Action. He was re-elected in the 2006 elections, on the joint Center Front coalition list which grouped the AP, We Are Peru and the National Coordinators of Independents, and in the 2011 elections on the list of the Possible Peru Alliance list, this time for the constituency of Lima, and in the 2016 elections for a final term, leaving office in 2019 in aftermath of the dissolution of the Congress by Martín Vizcarra. Lescano was one of the Congressmen who were in favor of the dissolution. In 2018, he disagreed with the final report of the Lava Jato Commission, chaired by Rosa Bartra (known for having politically shielded Alan García and not including him in the document), Lescano argued that the report could not be trusted, in as the members of the commission's board of directors "were judge and party," members of APRA and Fuerza Popular, whose leaders were under investigation in the Lava Jato case.

=== Party politics ===
He was the Popular Action party's General Secretary between 2009 and 2011.

=== Candidate for President of Peru ===
For the 2021 general election, Lescano won the presidential nomination of his party for the Presidency of Peru after defeating former Congressman Edmundo del Águila and Luis Enrique Gálvez with 63.67% of the vote. His running mates were Gisela Tipe and Alberto Velarde. He was one of the frontrunners in the Presidential Race. On Sunday, March 21, Lescano attended, along with 4 other candidates, a live debate held by América Televisión and Canal N. In one of his participations, the candidate engaged in a discussion with Verónika Mendoza, to whom he said that the political alliance to which he belongs has Yehude Simon in its ranks, accused of corruption. Mendoza replied that this character had been separated from the party: "We do separate the bad elements, not like you who cannot separate Mr. Merino, usurper and coup plotter, against whom the young people mobilized last November." Live conducted by América Televisión on the night of the debate, the candidate Lescano was in third place with 21%, surpassed by Mendoza (34%) and Forsyth (22%).

During his visit to Tacna, Lescano affirmed that he would ask Chile to return Monitor Huascar if he was elected president. After these words, the Chilean mayor Henry Campos responded saying that "The Huascar of our coasts does not move."

In the aftermath of Vizcarra's removal in November 2020, Lescano was a strong critic of Manuel Merino's ascension to the presidency. He disavowed Vizcarra's removal and Merino's role, siding with Cajamarca Governor Mesías Guevara in not approving his party's congressional caucus' decision.

Ultimately, Lescano placing fifth in an atomized race of 18 nominees.

== Ideology and views ==
Lescano has been described as having a centrist to center-left populist political position that is conservative in social aspects while being progressive economically. Regarding the economy, Lescano has proposed introducing a social market economy system to Peru, stating "You must respect the private initiative but have a regulatory state that prevents abuses". He has made statements opposed to large mining companies within Peru and suggested the nationalization of resources in the nation.

He opposed several times to the decisions of his party, as when Congress was dissolved in 2019, he supported Martín Vizcarra's measure and did not attend to the inauguration of Vice President Mercedes Araoz. His party was politically affected after Vizcarra's impeachment and the sudden rise to power of party member Manuel Merino, who held the position only for five days and promptly resigning after the a series of protests.

== Personal life ==
While studying in Chile, he met fellow lawyer Patricia Contador Durán and the two married, later having three children.

== Controversies ==
After his complaint against former congressman Mauricio Mulder, in March 2019 Lescano was denounced by a journalist for sexual harassment due to WhatsApp chats. In his defense, the congressman presented an international expert opinion which indicated that the images used for the complaint had been maliciously edited with the Photoshop program. However, on April 3, the plenary session of Congress suspended him for 120 days in accordance with the recommendation of the Ethics Commission.

His sister Vasty, was sentenced to 16 years in prison after being accused of belonging to the Shining Path terrorist organization. In the book Handwritten, autobiography written by Abimael Guzmán, prison leader of the terrorist group, there is thanks to Lescano for his "worthy services".
