= Eduardo Villanueva District =

Coordinates: 7.4621°S 78.1298°W

Eduardo Villanueva
- District
- Interactive map of Eduardo Villanueva
- Country: Peru
- Region: Cajamarca
- Province: San Marcos
- Founded: December 29, 1984
- Capital: La Grama

Government
  - Mayor: Antolino Acosta Espinoza

Area
  - Total: 63.13 km^{2} (24.37 sq mi)
- Elevation: 1,990 m (6,530 ft)

Population (2005 census)
  - Total: 2,472
  - Density: 39.16/km^{2} (101.4/sq mi)
- Time zone: UTC-5 (PET)
- UBIGEO: 061003

Eduardo Villanueva District is one of seven districts of the province San Marcos in Peru.
