= Walter Martos =

Peruvian politician and military general (1957–2025)

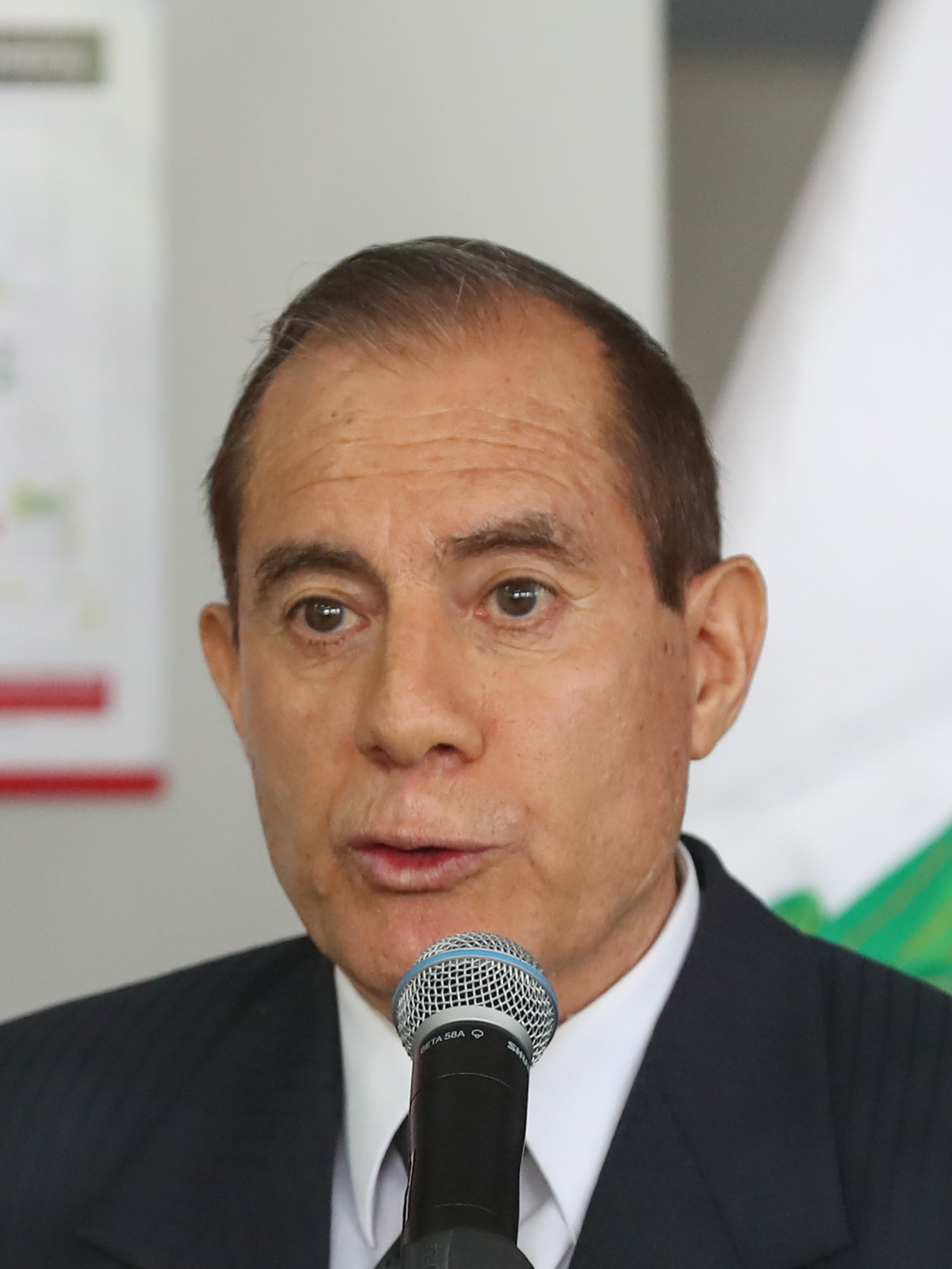

Prime Minister of Peru
- In office 6 August 2020 – 9 November 2020
- President: Martín Vizcarra
- Deputy: Desilú León Chempén
- Preceded by: Pedro Cateriano
- Succeeded by: Antero Flores Aráoz

Minister of Defense
- In office 3 October 2019 – 6 August 2020
- President: Martín Vizcarra
- Prime Minister: Vicente Zeballos; Pedro Cateriano
- Preceded by: Jorge Moscoso
- Succeeded by: Jorge Luis Chávez

Personal details
- Born: 11 February 1957 Cajamarca, Peru
- Died: 7 January 2025 (aged 67)
- Party: Independent
- Education: Chorrillos Military School (BMS, MMS)
- Profession: Army general

Military service
- Allegiance: Peru
- Branch: Peruvian Army
- Years of service: 1977–2019
- Rank: Major-general
- Conflict: Internal conflict in Peru

Walter Roger Martos Ruiz (11 February 1957 – 7 January 2025) was a Peruvian military general and politician who briefly served as Prime Minister of Peru from August to November 2020, under President Martín Vizcarra's administration. He had previously served as Minister of Defense from October 2019 to August 2020.

A major-general of the Peruvian Army, Martos served in a variety of leading military positions throughout his career.

== Early life and army career ==
Martos was born on 11 February 1957, in Cajamarca. Following the conclusion of his high school education at the Cristo Rey Maristas School, Martos enrolled in the Chorrillos Military School, where he graduated in 1978 with a specialization in Engineering. He attained a master's degree at the Army's Superior War College and at the Army's Scientific and Technological Institute.

He was successively Secretary General of the Army General Command; General Commander of Education and Doctrine Command of the Peruvian Army; Commander General of the Northern Military Region (2011); Chief of General Staff of the Army; and Chair of Joint Chiefs of Staff of the Armed Forces (2013).

Martos was also director of the Army Language Center; Academic deputy director and director of the Military School of Chorrillos; director of the School of Engineering and the Superior School of War.

== Political career ==
=== Minister of Defense (2019–2020) ===
On 3 October 2019, as a retired general, Martos was sworn in as Minister of Defense, as part of the cabinet led by Vicente Zeballos, of the Martín Vizcarra administration. He succeeded retired Vice Admiral Jorge Moscoso in said position, as part of the cabinet renewal following the dissolution of the Peruvian Congress four days prior.

=== Prime Minister (2020) ===
Following the congressional denial of confidence against Pedro Cateriano's cabinet, President Martín Vizcarra appointed Martos as Prime Minister of Peru on 6 August 2020.

After three months in office, Martos resigned alongside his cabinet following the impeachment and removal of President Vizcarra, on 9 November 2020.

== Death ==
Martos died on 7 January 2025 at the age of 67.

Political offices
Preceded by Jorge Moscoso	Minister of Defense; 2019–2020	Succeeded by Jorge Chávez Cresta
Preceded by Pedro Cateriano	Prime Minister of Peru; 2020	Succeeded by Ántero Flores Aráoz
