= Alfredo Barnechea =

Peruvian politician and journalist

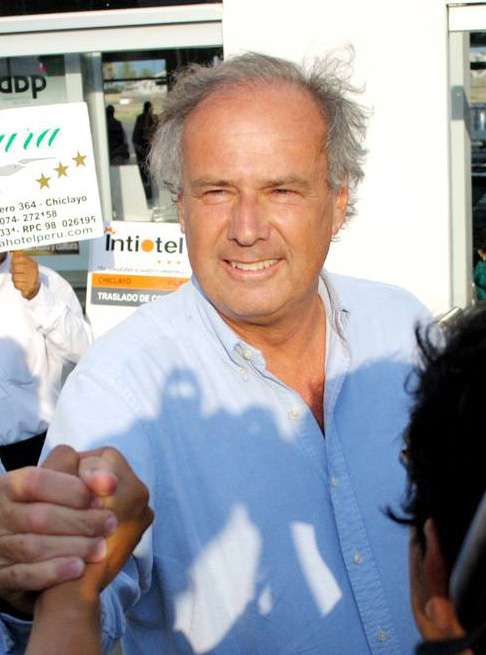

Member of the Chamber of Deputies
- In office 26 July 1985 – 26 July 1990
- Constituency: Lima

Personal details
- Born: Isaac Alfredo Barnechea García; 19 May 1952 (age 74) Ica, Peru
- Party: Popular Action (2013–present)
- Other political affiliations: Peruvian Aprista Party (1980-1987)
- Spouse: Claudia Ganoza Temple
- Education: Pontifical Catholic University of Peru (non-graduate); Harvard University

Isaac Alfredo Barnechea García (born 19 May 1952) is a Peruvian journalist and politician. In the 2016 elections, he ran for President of Peru under the Acción Popular party, finishing in fourth place. He was among the potential candidates for the 2021 general election until he withdrew his pre-candidacy in November 2020. The nomination was subsequently won by Yonhy Lescano.

== Education ==
In 1992, he earned a Master's in Public Administration from the John F. Kennedy School of Government at Harvard University. After obtaining his degree, he worked at the Inter-American Development Bank and the Andean Community.

== Journalistic career ==
As a journalist, he hosted the television interview program titled "Direct Contact", which ran from 1978 to 1980. The show was overseen by the military dictatorship until 1980. Since then, he has been a columnist for the Spanish newspaper El País, the Peruvian magazine Caretas and has written six books about Peruvian politics and political economy.

== Political career ==
=== Early political career ===
Barnechea was member of the APRA party. He ran unsuccessfully for mayor of Lima in 1983, losing to the left-wing candidate Alfonso Barrantes Lingán. Barnechea was elected to Peru's lower house of the Congress in 1985 and took office on 26 July 1985 during the government of President Alan García. He resigned the party after García announced plans to nationalize the banks in 1987.

=== Presidential campaign ===
In 2013, Barnechea joined the Popular Action party and in 2015, he was later selected as the party's presidential candidate (after internal primaries) for the 2016 elections. There he defeated three opponents and officially became the Popular Action Candidate for President of Peru, accompanied in his formula by Congressman Víctor Andrés García Belaúnde for the first vice-presidency, and Edmundo Del Águila Morote for the second vice-presidency. He rose second and third in the polls after the disqualifications of Julio Guzmán and César Acuña Peralta. He ended the election in fourth place with 7.0% of the popular vote, ahead of Popular Alliance candidate and former President Alan García, but was surpassed by Verónika Mendoza, Pedro Pablo Kuczynski and Keiko Fujimori.

=== Post-presidential campaign ===
Between 2016 and 2020 he participated in various party activities, but did not hold any position at the leadership level nor did he hold an executive position.

On October 25, 2020, he announced that he would participate in the internal electoral process of Popular Action as a candidate for the Presidency of the Republic, in a presidential formula that included the participation of Maricarmen Alva as a candidate for the first vice-presidency of the Republic, and the former Congressman Armando Villanueva Mercado as a candidate for the second vice presidency of the Republic. However, on November 23, 2020, six days before the internal electoral process of Popular Action, Barnechea announced that he was resigning from the candidacy for the Presidency of the Republic, for disagreeing with the decisions made by the Popular Action group and that led to the presidency of the Republic to Manuel Merino, as well as the divisions within the party. Subsequently, Yonhy Lescano won the nomination.

== Personal life ==
Barnechea is married, since 1983, to Claudia Ganoza Temple, a former step-daughter to United Nations Secretary General Javier Pérez de Cuéllar (1920-2020). They have three children.
