= 2016 Peruvian general election =

- Presidential election
- 10 April 2016 (first round); 5 June 2016 (second round)
- Opinion polls
- Turnout: 81.80% (first round) ▼0.91pp 80.09% (second round) ▼2.45pp
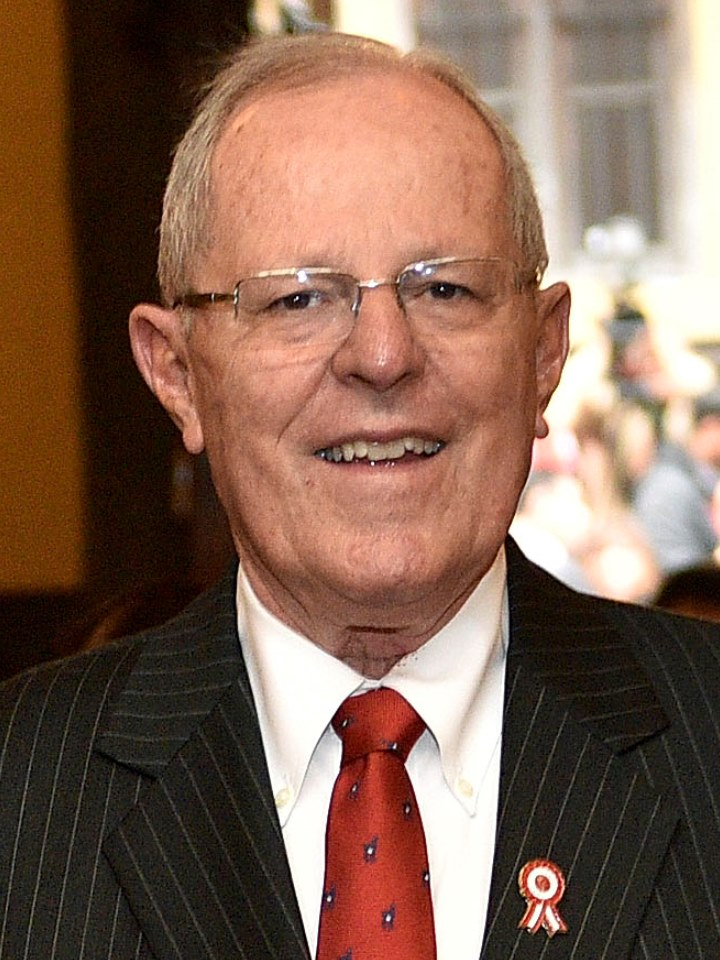

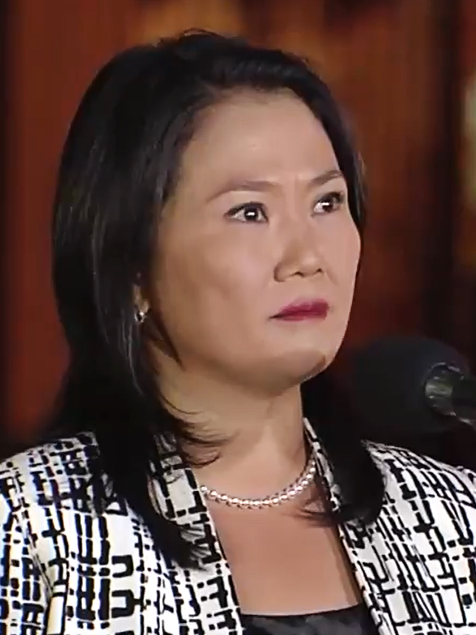
Nominee	Pedro Pablo Kuczynski	Keiko Fujimori
Party	PPK	FP
Running mate	Martín Vizcarra; Mercedes Aráoz	José Chlimper; Vladimiro Huaroc (Note: Excluded from campaign)
Popular vote	8,596,937	8,555,880
Percentage	50.12%	49.88%
President before election
Ollanta Humala
GP
Elected President
Pedro Pablo Kuczynski
PPK
- Congressional election
- 10 April 2016
- All 130 seats in the Congress of Peru; 66 seats needed for a majority
Party	Leader	Vote %	Seats	+/–
FP	Keiko Fujimori	36.34	73	+36
PPK	Pedro Pablo Kuczynski	16.46	18	New
Broad Front	Marco Arana	13.94	20	New
APP	César Acuña	9.23	9	+7
Popular Alliance	Alan García	8.31	5	+1
Popular Action	Mesías Guevara	7.20	5	0
This lists parties that won seats. See the complete results below.
Results by department

General elections were held in Peru on 10 April 2016 to determine the president, vice-presidents, composition of the Congress of the Republic of Peru and the Peruvian representatives of the Andean Parliament.

In the race for the presidency, incumbent President Ollanta Humala was ineligible for re-election due to constitutional term limits. Popular Force candidate Keiko Fujimori, daughter of former President Alberto Fujimori, was the leading candidate in the first round with almost 40 per cent of the vote, but fell short of the 50 per cent majority required to avoid a second round. Peruvians for Change candidate Pedro Pablo Kuczynski narrowly beat Broad Front candidate Verónika Mendoza to finish in second and earn a place in the second round. The run-off was held on 5 June 2016. With support from those opposing Fujimori, Kuczynski won by a narrow margin of less than half a percentage point, making this the first presidential election since 2000 in which the previous election's runner-up candidate failed to secure election. He was sworn in as President on 28 July.

In the Congressional elections, Popular Force won in a landslide, receiving more than a third of the vote and winning an absolute majority of 73 out of 130 seats. Broad Front with 20 seats and Peruvians for Change with 18 seats emerged as the main opposition blocs.

== Background ==
On 13 November 2015, incumbent President Ollanta Humala called for a general election to be held on 10 April 2016. He said that he would respect the constitutional term limit restrictions and would not run again.

== Electoral system ==
The President was elected using the two-round system. The 130 members of the Congress of the Republic were elected in 25 multi-member constituencies using open list proportional representation.

== Presidential nominees ==
=== Campaign highlights ===
The presidential tickets were to be filed with the National Office of Electoral Processes (ONPE) by 10 January 2016. Congressional lists were to be filed with the ONPE by 10 February 2016.

In March 2016, presidential candidates Julio Guzmán from All for Peru and César Acuña Peralta from Alliance for Progress were barred from the elections; Guzmán due to a violation of party rules in the party's internal election and Acuña Peralta due to monetary giveaways during a campaign rally, a violation of an electoral law enacted by Congress in November 2015.

Keiko Fujimori was a highly polarizing figure during the election. The daughter of the controversial former president Alberto Fujimori, who was serving time in prison at the time, she was popular among the poor and loyalists who credit her father with the defeat of Shining Path. This popularity allowed her to win in the first round of the presidential elections. She was viewed unfavorably by a number of people who oppose Fujimori for human rights abuses and corrupt practices, and who feared that her victory would mark a return of Fujimorism. Mendoza, who placed third and could not stand in the runoff election, gave her full endorsement to Kuczynski, in order to prevent Fujimori's victory.

=== Main presidential nominees ===
Presidential tickets
Popular Action	Popular Force	Popular Alliance	Peruvians for Change	Broad Front
Alfredo Barnechea	Keiko Fujimori	Alan García	Pedro Pablo Kuczynski	Verónika Mendoza
Member of Congress (1985–1990)	Member of Congress (2006–2011)	President of Peru (1985–1990 / 2006–2011)	President of the Council of Ministers (2005–2006)	Member of Congress (2011–2016)
Running mates
1st: Víctor A. García Belaúnde; 2nd: Edmundo del Águila	1st: José Chlimper; 2nd: Vladimiro Huaroc	1st: Lourdes Flores; 2nd: David Salazar	1st: Martín Vizcarra; 2nd: Mercedes Aráoz	1st: Marco Arana; 2nd: Alan Fairlie

- Alfredo Barnechea is Popular Action's nominee. A renowned journalist in the 1980s, his first stint in politics occurred in 1983, as he ran for mayor of Lima with the APRA, losing to Alfonso Barrantes. Elected to the lower house Peruvian Congress in 1985, he quit the party and remained in opposition to Alan García. Participating in the 1990 Democratic Front campaign, he subsequently attained a master's degree in public administration from Harvard Kennedy School. A member of Popular Action since 2013, ideologically he considers himself a social democrat.
- Keiko Fujimori, is the nominee and leader of the conservative Popular Force. She is the daughter of former President Alberto Fujimori, who serves in prison for a series of crimes and human rights violations during his presidency. A graduate of Columbia Business School, she served in the Peruvian Congress from 2006 to 2011, and made it to the run-off with Ollanta Humala in the 2011 election, losing by a small margin. Her nomination remained a highly polarizing one throughout the election.
- Alan García, is the leader of the social democrat APRA and Popular Alliance's nominee. One of the two former presidents running in the election, this was his fourth and final run before his suicide in 2019. His first presidency from 1985 to 1990 is considered by historians a failure due to the country's period of instability caused by terrorism and a severe economic crisis, in contrast to his second presidency, which is regarded a success based on the steady economy experienced and poverty reduction, although marred by corruption accusations. In this election, he ran under an electoral coalition with the Christian People's Party and Go Peru, with former presidential nominee Lourdes Flores as his first running mate. Academically, he holds a law degree from the National University of San Marcos, and a master's in sociology at the University of Paris 1 Pantheon-Sorbonne.
- Pedro Pablo Kuczynski, is the nominee and leader of the liberal conservative Peruvians for Change. A prominent economist from the University of Oxford and Princeton University, this was his second presidential run following his third place in 2011. He served in Alejandro Toledo's presidency as Prime Minister and Minister of Economy and Finance, in addition to serving as Minister of Energy and Mines in the second presidency of Fernando Belaúnde.
- Verónika Mendoza, is Broad Front's nominee, a socialist coalition. A psychology major from the Paris Diderot University, she served in the Peruvian Congress from 2011 to 2016, representing the constituency of Cuzco, elected under the Peru Wins coalition of ex-president Ollanta Humala, but later left it. Throughout the campaign, she received much criticism for her left-wing policies, and for previous refusing to call Venezuela "a dictatorship" under Hugo Chávez and Nicolás Maduro.

=== Minor presidential nominees ===
Presidential tickets
Possible Peru	Order	Direct Democracy	Hope Front
Alejandro Toledo	Antero Flores Aráoz	Gregorio Santos	Fernando Olivera
President of Peru (2001-2006)	Minister of Defense (2007–2009)	Governor of Cajamarca (2011-2014)	Minister of Justice (2001-2002)

- Alejandro Toledo, former President of Peru (2001–2006) – Possible Peru
- Gregorio Santos, former Governor of Cajamarca (2011–2014) – Direct Democracy
- Antero Flores Aráoz, former Minister of Defense (2007–2009) – Order
- Miguel Hilario – Peru Progressing
- Fernando Olivera, former Minister of Justice (2001–2002) – Hope Front

=== Withdrawn nominees ===
Party	Ticket			Withdrawal	
Name	for President	for First Vice President	for Second Vice President	Date	Motive
Always Together; Siempre Unidos	Felipe Castillo	Guillermo Ruiz	Isaac Humala	10 February 2016	Internal party disputes.
Peru Secure Homeland; Perú Patria Segura	Renzo Reggiardo	Carlos Vicente Marca	Miluska Carrasco	10 February 2016	Nominee claimed lack of credibility in the electoral process.
Peruvian Nationalist Party; Partido Nacionalista Peruano	Daniel Urresti	Susana Villarán	Maciste Díaz	11 March 2016	Party filed for withdrawal in order to preserve party registration.
Libertarian Perú; Perú Libertario	Vladimir Cerrón	Jorge Paredes Terry	Jesús Zárate	24 March 2016	In protest of the National Jury of Elections for not disqualifying Keiko Fujimori.
Peruvian Humanist Party; Partido Humanista Peruano	Yehude Simon	Rosa Mavila	Yorka Gamarra	28 March 2016	Party filed for withdrawal in order to preserve party registration.
Peru Nation; Perú Nación	Francisco Diez Canseco	Claudio Zolla	Margarita Gamboa	29 March 2016	Party filed for withdrawal in order to preserve party registration.
National Solidarity; Solidaridad Nacional	Hernando Guerra García	José Luna	Gustavo Rondón	29 March 2016	Party filed for withdrawal in order to preserve party registration.

=== Disqualified nominees ===
Party	Ticket			Disqualification	
Name	for President	for First Vice President	for Second Vice President	Date	Motive
Alliance for the Progress of Peru; Alianza para el Progreso del Perú	César Acuña	Anel Townsend	Humberto Lay	9 March 2016	Disqualified for attempted vote buying in campaign trail.
All for Peru; Todos por el Perú	Julio Guzmán	Juana Umasi	Carolina Lizárraga	9 March 2016	Disqualified for irregularities in nomination process.

== Results ==
=== President ===
First round results by department (small left) and municipality (big right)

Second round results by department (small left) and municipality (big right)

The first round was held on 10 April. Exit polls indicated that Keiko Fujimori placed first in the first round of voting with approximately 40% of the vote, with Pedro Pablo Kuczynski and Veronika Mendoza each receiving approximately 20%.

The second round was held on 5 June. Exit polls indicated that Pedro Pablo Kuczynski held a slight lead over Keiko Fujimori. As counting continued, the gap narrowed significantly. Preliminary results gave Kuczynski a 0.25 per cent advantage over Fujimori, with less than 50,000 votes between them. Approximately 50,000 votes were challenged during the count. Fujimori conceded the election to Kuczynski on 10 June.

Candidate	Party	First round		Second round	
Candidate	Party	Votes	%	Votes	%
Keiko Fujimori	Popular Force	6,115,073	39.86	8,555,880	49.88
Pedro Pablo Kuczynski	Peruvians for Change	3,228,661	21.05	8,596,937	50.12
Verónika Mendoza	Broad Front	2,874,940	18.74		
Alfredo Barnechea	Popular Action	1,069,360	6.97		
Alan García	Popular Alliance	894,278	5.83		
Gregorio Santos	Direct Democracy	613,173	4.00		
Fernando Olivera	Hope Front	203,103	1.32		
Alejandro Toledo	Possible Peru	200,012	1.30		
Miguel Hilario	Peru Progressing	75,870	0.49		
Antero Flores Aráoz	Order	65,673	0.43		
Total		15,340,143	100.00	17,152,817	100.00
Valid votes		15,340,143	81.88	17,152,817	93.51
Invalid/blank votes		3,393,987	18.12	1,190,079	6.49
Total votes		18,734,130	100.00	18,342,896	100.00
Registered voters/turnout		22,901,954	81.80	22,901,954	80.09
Source: ONPE, ONPE

=== Congress ===
Popular Force won in a landslide, taking more than a third of the vote and an absolute majority of 73 out of 130 seats. Behind them in opposition, Peruvians for Change with 18 seats and Broad Front with 20 seats. Other parties which gained representation in Congress include Alliance for the Progress of Peru (9 seats), Popular Alliance (5 seats) and Popular Action (5 seats).

Party	Votes	%	Seats
Popular Force	4,431,077	36.34	73
Peruvians for Change	2,007,710	16.46	18
Broad Front	1,700,052	13.94	20
Alliance for the Progress of Peru	1,125,682	9.23	9
Popular Alliance	1,013,735	8.31	5
Popular Action	877,734	7.20	5
Direct Democracy	528,301	4.33	0
Possible Peru	286,980	2.35	0
Hope Front	139,634	1.15	0
Order	68,474	0.56	0
Peru Progressing	14,663	0.12	0
Total	12,194,042	100.00	130
Valid votes	12,194,042	65.03	
Invalid/blank votes	6,557,222	34.97	
Total votes	18,751,264	100.00	
Registered voters/turnout	22,901,954	81.88	
Source: JNE

=== Andean Parliament ===
Only the three main parties obtained representation in the Andean Parliament, with Popular Force obtaining 3 seats (plus six substitutes) each, and Broad Front and Peruvians for Change obtaining only one seat (and two substitutes). Popular Force got the most votes, with 38.1% of the valid ballots. Former congressman Rolando Sousa of Popular Force obtained the most individual votes, with 407,811.

Party	Votes	%	Seats
Popular Force	3,842,651	38.10	3
Broad Front	1,559,027	15.46	1
Peruvians for Change	1,505,118	14.92	1
Popular Alliance	821,492	8.14	0
Popular Action	807,585	8.01	0
Alliance for the Progress of Peru	763,792	7.57	0
Direct Democracy	506,108	5.02	0
Possible Peru	220,790	2.19	0
Order	59,318	0.59	0
Total	10,085,881	100.00	5
Valid votes	10,085,881	53.78	
Invalid/blank votes	8,666,467	46.22	
Total votes	18,752,348	100.00	
Registered voters/turnout	22,901,954	81.88	
Source: JNE
