= Ántero Flores Aráoz =

Peruvian lawyer and politician

Ántero Flores-Aráoz OSP
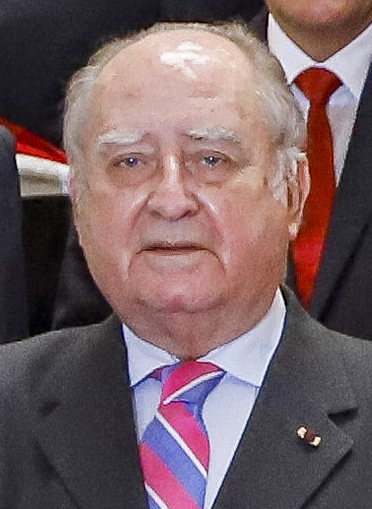

Prime Minister of Peru
- In office 11 November 2020 – 17 November 2020
- President: Manuel Merino
- Preceded by: Walter Martos
- Succeeded by: Violeta Bermúdez

Minister of Defense
- In office 20 December 2007 – 11 July 2009
- President: Alan García
- Prime Minister: Jorge Del Castillo; Yehude Simon
- Preceded by: Allan Wagner
- Succeeded by: Rafael Rey

President of Congress
- In office 26 July 2004 – 26 July 2005
- Preceded by: Henry Pease
- Succeeded by: Marcial Ayaipoma

Member of Congress
- In office 26 July 2001 – 26 July 2006
- Constituency: Lima
- In office 26 July 1995 – 26 July 2001
- Constituency: National

Member of the Democratic Constituent Congress
- In office 26 November 1992 – 26 July 1995
- Constituency: National

Member of the Chamber of Deputies
- In office 26 July 1990 – 5 April 1992
- Constituency: Lima

Lima City Councilman
- In office 1 January 1987 – 31 December 1989

President of the Order Political Party
- In office 23 April 2009 – 13 July 2017

President of the Christian People's Party
- In office 18 December 1999 – 18 December 2003
- Preceded by: Luis Bedoya Reyes
- Succeeded by: Lourdes Flores

Personal details
- Born: Ántero Flores-Aráoz Esparza; 28 February 1942 (age 84) Lima, Peru
- Party: Independent (2017–present)
- Other political affiliations: Order (2009–2017); Christian People's Party (1980–2007)
- Spouse: Ana María Cedrón Brandariz
- Children: 3
- Education: Pontifical Catholic University of Peru; National University of San Marcos (LL.B.)
- Occupation: Lawyer; politician

Ántero Flores-Aráoz Esparza (born 28 February 1942) is a Peruvian lawyer and politician who briefly served as Prime Minister of Peru in November 2020. Once a prominent member and leader of the Christian People's Party, he left and founded the Order Party in order to run for the presidency at the 2016 general election, in which he placed tenth and last with 0.4% of the popular vote.

== Biography ==
Son of Ántero Flores-Aráoz Adalid and Inés Esparza Moselli. He was born in Lima in 1942. He is the fourth grandson of the hero of the Independence of Argentina and Peru, Francisco Aráoz de Lamadrid.

He studied primary and secondary school at Colegio La Salle de Lima. He entered the Faculty of Law of the Pontificia Universidad Católica del Perú; however, he transferred to the National University of San Marcos, from which he graduated in Law and obtained the title of Lawyer.

He has also served as a teacher at the University of Lima and at the University of San Martín de Porres.

== Political career ==
=== Congress of Peru ===
He first ran for the Congress of Peru in 1985 as a member of the Christian People's Party, but was not elected. In 1990, he once ran again for Congress of Peru under the FREDEMO coalition and was elected. In 2004 he was elected President of the Congress of the Republic of Peru, the only opposition Congress President during the presidency of Alejandro Toledo. On 2 December 2006, he received the post of Permanent Representative of Peru to the Organization of American States. Beginning in December 2007, he has served as Defense Minister of Peru as well.

=== Minister of Defense ===
Flores-Aráoz assumed the position of Minister of Defense of Peru on December 20, 2007, replacing Allan Wagner Tizón, who became the Peruvian Representative before the International Court of The Hague in the case of limits. maritime and land with Chile.

Flores-Aráoz is recognized for being Alan García's Minister of Defense during the 2009 Baguazo massacre. Following the massacre of revolting natives that resulted in the deaths of thirty-three, he resigned from office.

=== Prime Minister of Peru ===
Following the removal of Martín Vizcarra, Flores-Aráoz was named prime minister by Manuel Merino on 11 November 2020. After Merino resigned and was replaced by Francisco Sagasti as president, Sagasti appointed Violeta Bermúdez, a constitutional lawyer, to replace Flores-Aráoz as prime minister on 18 November 2020.

The government of Francisco Sagasti announced following Merino's resignation that the attorney general would investigate if Flores-Aráoz was responsible for possible human rights violations.

== Political positions ==
Flores Aráoz holds conservative political positions, and although he was known as a pragmatist and a moderate christian democrat early in his political career, he eventually shifted to far right politics since his exit from the Christian People's Party in 2007. He also has been active in denouncing terrorism in Peru.

=== Education ===
Regarding education, Flores-Aráoz supported the low-quality and potentially fraudulent private universities that were closed by government regulators, stating they "deserve a second chance". In one exchange with a reporter in 2006 about discussing a free trade agreement with Peruvians that was reported by Página/12 as having "exposed his racism", he described voters as "llamas and vicuñas", stating "You can't ask them a technical issue. It's outrageous. You can't ask all citizens. Those who can't read and write, you're not going to ask that".

=== Sexual rights ===
The stances of Flores-Aráoz on sexual rights have been described as conservative. In 2016, he stated "I am absolutely against gay marriage", explaining that he believed "in what is natural, what God did". He also prosecuted dancer and model Leysi Suarez for taking photos of herself naked while sitting on the Peruvian flag.

Political offices
Preceded by Allan Wagner	Minister of Defense; 2007–2009	Succeeded by Rafael Rey
Preceded by Walter Martos	Prime Minister of Peru; 2020	Succeeded by Violeta Bermúdez
