= Regional Government of Cajamarca =

Regional government in Peru

- Gobierno Regional de Cajamarca

Regional Government overview
- Formed: January 1, 2003; 22 years ago
- Jurisdiction: Department of Cajamarca
- Headquarters: Cajamarca
- Website: Government site

The Regional Government of Cajamarca (Spanish: Gobierno Regional de Cajamarca; GORE Cajamarca) is the regional government that represents the Department of Cajamarca. It is the body with legal identity in public law and its own assets, which is in charge of the administration of provinces of the department in Peru. Its purpose is the social, cultural and economic development of its constituency. It is based in the city of Cajamarca.

== List of representatives ==
Governor	Political party	Period
Felipe Pita Gastelumendi	APRA	January 1, 2003–December 31, 2006
Jesús Coronel Salirrosas	Movimiento Independiente Regional Fuerza Social	January 1, 2007–December 31, 2010
Gregorio Santos	Movimiento de Afirmación Social	January 1, 2011–December 31, 2014
Porfirio Medina	Movimiento de Afirmación Social	January 1, 2015–December 31, 2018
Mesías Guevara	Acción Popular	January 1, 2019–December 31, 2022
Roger Guevara	Somos Perú	January 1, 2023–Incumbent

== See also ==
- Regional Governments of Peru
- Department of Cajamarca
