= Ichocán =

Coordinates: 7°22′S 78°08′W

Ichocan Ichocán
- City
- Interactive map of Ichocan
- Country: Peru
- Region: Ichocán District

Ichocán is a town in the Ichocán District, San Marcos Province, Cajamarca region, Peru. It is the capital of Ichocán District.

== Geography ==
Ichocán is at an altitude of 2,596 metres (8,517 ft). It is 124 kilometres (77 mi) from Cajamarca. The imposing hills called "The Church" and "The Bell" can be seen when approaching this district. Ichocán was formerly known as Ichoca. Actress and artist Yma Sumac was born in Ichocán, according to some sources; other sources cite her place of birth as Callao.
