= Order (Peru) =

Order Political Party Partido Político Orden
- President: Ántero Flores Aráoz
- Secretary-General: Jorge Wong Luck
- Founded: 23 April 2009
- Dissolved: 13 July 2017
- Split from: Christian People's Party
- Headquarters: Lima
- Ideology: Conservatism; Nationalism
- Political position: Right-wing
- Colours: Light blue

Order Political Party (Spanish: Partido Político Orden) was a minor conservative Peruvian political party. Founded in July 2014 by former Defense Minister, Ántero Flores Aráoz, he was nominated for the Presidency in the 2016 general election.

At the general election held on April 10, 2016, the party's ticket won 0.4% of the popular vote, placing tenth and last. At parliamentary level, the party won 0.6% and no seats in the Congress of the Republic. The party was subsequently cancelled by the National Elections Jury in July 2017 along other parties that failed to pass the electoral threshold.

== Election results ==
=== Presidential election ===
Year	Candidate	Party	Votes	Percentage	Outcome
2016	Ántero Flores Aráoz	Order	65 673	0.43	10th

=== Elections to the Congress of the Republic ===
Year	Votes	%	Seats	▲/▼	Position
2016	68 474	0.6%	0 / 130	Steady	N/A
