= Rolando Sousa =

Peruvian politician (born 1961)

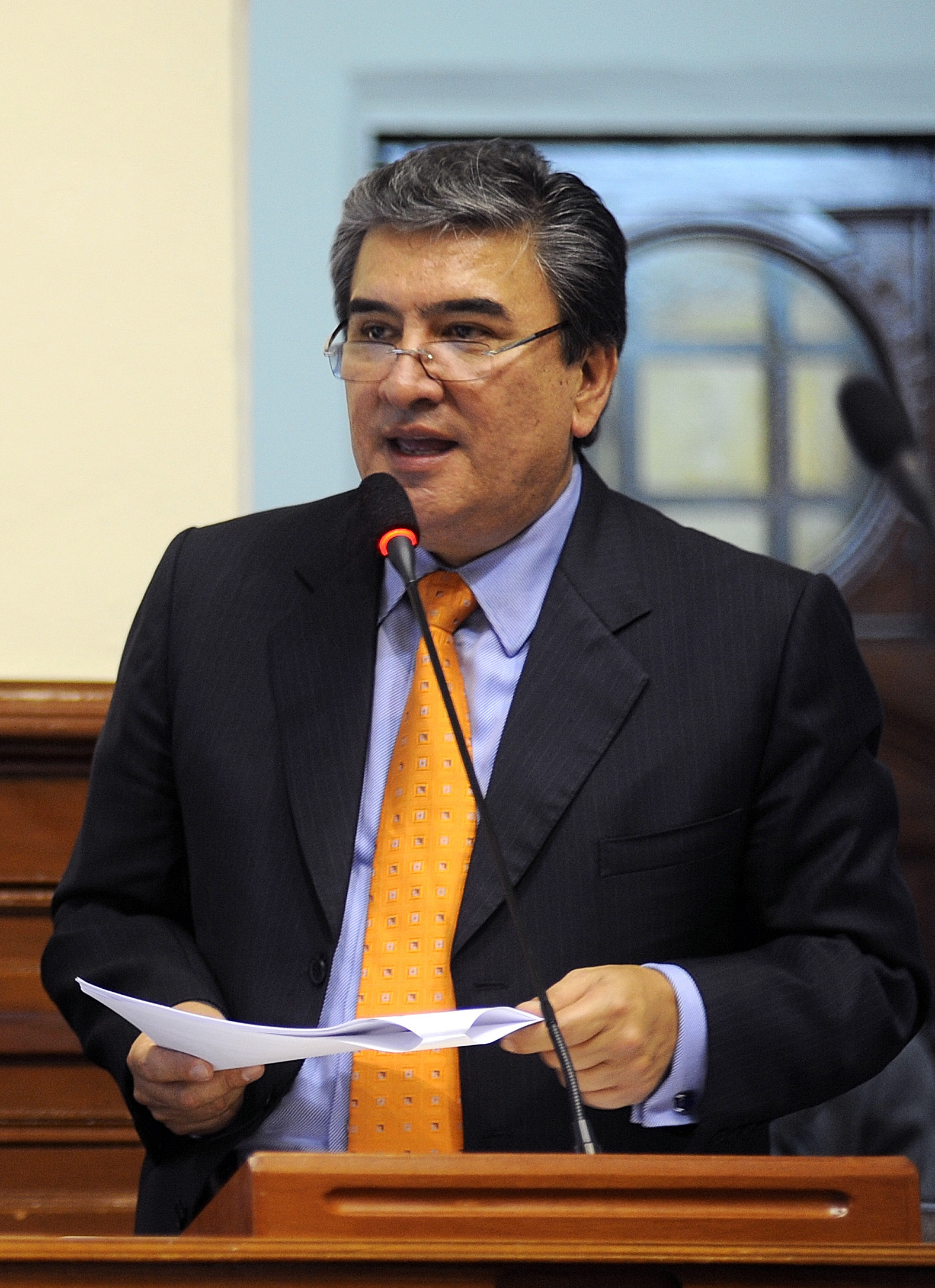
- Rolando Sousa in 2010

Peruvian Representative to the Andean Parliament
- In office July 26, 2016 – July 26, 2021

Member of Congress
- In office July 26, 2006 – July 26, 2011
- Constituency: Lima

Personal details
- Born: Víctor Rolando Sousa Huanambal; 22 August 1961 (age 65) Lambayeque, Peru
- Party: Popular Force (since 2010)
- Other political affiliations: Alliance for the Future (2006-2010); New Majority (2006-2009)
- Occupation: Lawyer
- Profession: Politician

Víctor Rolando Sousa Huanambal (born 22 August 1961) is a Peruvian lawyer and Fujimorist politician. He was a former Congressman representing Lima from 2006 to 2011, elected under the Fujimorist Alliance for the Future in which, he also ran unsuccessfully for the second vice presidency as the running mate of Congresswoman Martha Chávez under the Fujimorist Alliance for the Future, in which, the ticket placed fourth. He is a former Representative to the Andean Parliament serving from 2016 to 2021.

== Early life ==
Sousa was born in Lambayeque on 22 August 1961.

== Career ==
Since 2001 he was former President Alberto Fujimori’s lawyer in Peru, in association with the criminal attorney César Nakasaki, in which the defense which was taken over by another lawyer, in 2013.

== Political career ==
=== 2006 elections ===
In the 2006 elections, he was elected as a Congressman, representing the constituency of Lima for the 2006-2011 term after getting 38,578 votes, in which he also ran unsuccessfully for the second vice presidency as the running mate of Congresswoman Martha Chávez under the Fujimorist Alliance for the Future, in which, the ticket placed fourth.

=== Congressman ===
As of August 3, 2006, the Board of Spokesmen of the Congress of the Republic, and the multiparty table (which decides the organization of the various working committees in Congress) appointed him as coordinator of the Committee on Foreign Affairs. Traditionally, the coordinators later become committee chairmen.

This table was mainly comprised by the APRA and UN parties; however, the decision was unanimous. Rolando Sousa also chaired the Committee on Justice and Human Rights of the Congress for two consecutive periods, while in Congress. He served as Congressman until July 26, 2011.

=== Representative to the Andean Parliament ===
He ran for a seat in the Andean Parliament in the 2016 general election under the ticket of the Popular Force party of Keiko Fujimori and was No. 1 in the list and was elected to the Andean Parliament for the 2016-2021 term as he received the highest individual number of votes in the election. He took office on July 26, 2016 and left office on July 26, 2021.
