= Peru Progressing =

Peru Progressing Progresando Perú
- President: Manuel Ponce Ayala
- Founded: 14 December 2015
- Dissolved: 13 July 2017
- Headquarters: Lima
- Ideology: Conservative liberalism Ecologism
- Political position: Centre-right
- Colours: Dark red

Peru Progressing (Spanish: Progresando Perú) was a minor Peruvian political party. Founded in December 2015 by businessman Manuel Ponce Ayala, the party launched Miguel Hilario, an academic of Shipibo-Konibo descent, as its presidential nominee.

At the general election held on April 10, 2016, the party's ticket won 0.5% of the popular vote, placing ninth. At congressional level, the party won 0.1% and no seats in the Congress of the Republic. The party was subsequently cancelled by the National Elections Jury in July 2017 along with the other parties that failed to pass the electoral threshold.

== Election results ==
=== Presidential election ===
Year	Candidate	Party	Votes	Percentage	Outcome
2016	Miguel Hilario	Peru Progressing	75 870	0.49	9th

=== Elections to the Congress of the Republic ===
Year	Votes	%	Seats	▲/▼	Position
2016	14 663	0.1%	0 / 130	Steady	N/A
