= Valentín Paniagua =

Peruvian lawyer and politician (1936–2006)

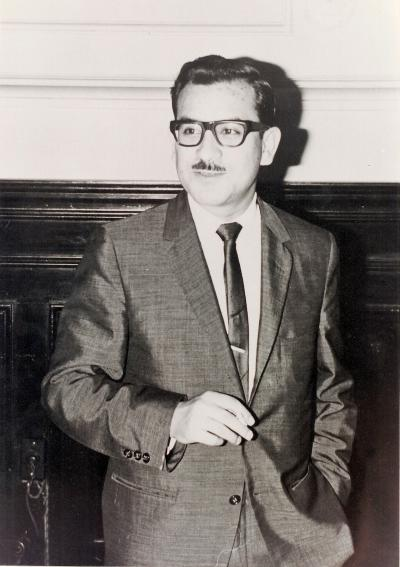
- Paniagua in 1963

President of Peru
- In office 22 November 2000 – 28 July 2001
- Prime Minister: Javier Pérez de Cuéllar
- Vice President: First Vice President Vacant; Second Vice President Vacant
- Preceded by: Alberto Fujimori
- Succeeded by: Alejandro Toledo

President of Congress
- In office 16 November 2000 – 22 November 2000; On Leave: 22 November 2000 – 26 July 2001 (Note: Ascended into the presidency of Peru on 22 November 2000 as the President of Congress. His roles in the Congress of the Republic was immediately suspended as soon as he took the presidency.)
- Vice President: 1st Vice President Luz Salgado; 2nd Vice President Marianella Monsalve; 3rd Vice President María Jesús Espinoza
- Preceded by: Luz Salgado (a.i.)
- Succeeded by: Luz Salgado (a.i.)
- President of the Chamber of Deputies
- In office 27 July 1982 – 26 July 1983
- Vice President: 1st Vice President Manuel Tafur Ruíz; 2nd Vice President Rafael Vega García
- Preceded by: Luis Pércovich Roca
- Succeeded by: Dagoberto Láinez
Additional positions
Member of Congress
In office 27 July 2000 – 22 November 2000
Constituency	National
Minister of Education
In office 10 April 1984 – 12 October 1984
President	Fernando Belaúnde
Preceded by	Patricio Ricketts
Succeeded by	Andrés Cardo Franco
Member of the Chamber of Deputies
In office 27 July 1980 – 26 July 1985
Constituency	Lima
In office 27 July 1963 – 3 October 1968
Constituency	Lima
Minister of Justice and Worship
In office 15 September 1965 – 21 January 1966
President	Fernando Belaúnde
Preceded by	Carlos Fernández Sesarego
Succeeded by	Roberto Ramírez del Villar Beaumont
President of Popular Action
In office 2001–2004
Preceded by	Fernando Belaúnde
Succeeded by	Víctor Andrés García Belaúnde
Secretary General of the Popular Action Party
In office 1998–2000
Preceded by	Jorge Díaz León
Succeeded by	Javier Díaz Orihuela

Personal details
- Born: Valentín Toribio Demetrio Agustin Paniagua Corazao; 23 September 1936 Cusco, Peru
- Died: 16 October 2006 (aged 70) Lima, Peru
- Party: Acción Popular
- Spouse: Nilda Mercedes Jara Urías de Paniagua
- Education: National University of San Antonio Abad in Cuzco; National University of San Marcos (LL.B.); University of Indiana (M.A.)
- Profession: Lawyer

Valentín Toribio Demetrio Agustin Paniagua Corazao (23 September 1936 – 16 October 2006) was a Peruvian lawyer and politician who briefly served as President of Peru from 2000 to 2001. Elected President of Congress on 16 November 2000, he ascended to the presidency as incumbent Alberto Fujimori and both his Vice Presidents resigned by 22 November 2000.

Due to Fujimori shortening his presidential term in order to expire on 28 July 2001, Paniagua's main task was to oversee the new elections. Paniagua was a longtime member of Popular Action, serving as Secretary General and Party President.

== Early life and education ==
Paniagua's father was born in Bolivia but lived most of his life in Peru. Valentín Paniagua was born in Cusco and attended high school at Salesian School of Cusco. He went on to study law at the Universidad Nacional San Antonio Abad in Cusco, and subsequently transferred to the Universidad Mayor de San Marcos in Lima, where he completed his law degree. In the following years, he worked in his private practice as a lawyer and started a political career. In addition, he completed a master's degree in political science at the University of Indiana.

In August 1955, as a student leader, he was one of the founders of the Frente Universitario Reformista Independiente, a social-Christian reform organization, opposed to landowners' rights, to the communists and to the APRA. Paniagua became a member of the Christian Democrat Party (PDC), which was best aligned to his Roman Catholic and reformist ideals.

== Political career ==
In June 1963 he was elected to Congress as a representative for Cusco in the joint list of Acción Popular (AP) and PDC, an alliance that catapulted the leader of AP, Fernando Belaúnde, to the presidency of the country. Despite Paniagua's youth, Belaúnde appointed him Minister of Justice and Cult in his first government.

In 1966, a section of the PDC led by the then-mayor of Lima, Luis Bedoya Reyes, cut ties with the leadership of Héctor Cornejo Chávez and founded the Partido Popular Cristiano (PPC). However, Paniagua remained in the ranks of the government.

The coup d'état of General Juan Velasco Alvarado on 3 October 1968, sent Paniagua out of Congress and for some years he was left out of politics. His loyalty to the constitutional legality of Belaúnde led him to abandon the PDC on 27 July 1974, in protest of its acceptance of the military government. Some time later, he became a member of AP, and kept on a civil protest against Velasco and his 1975 successor, General Francisco Morales-Bermúdez.

In the elections of 18 May 1980, he was re-elected to Congress, and his party boss, Belaúnde, won his second presidency.

In July 1982, after being part of the Constitutional Commission of the Chamber of Deputies, he became President of the Chamber of Deputies.

On 10 May 1985, he became Minister of Education. In October of that year, he resigned to return to his parliamentary activities. He was given the Orden del Sol in the Gran Cruz grade.

The defeat of AP in the 14 April 1985 elections and arrival to power of Alan García's APRA sent Paniagua to the opposition. Over the following five years he remained a strong foe of the government and worked as a prestigious lawyer in academic and political circles, as well as a professor of constitutional law at the universities of San Marcos, Femenina del Sagrado Corazón and Pontificia Católica.

In the national elections of 1990, together with most of Acción Popular, Paniagua supported the candidacy of Mario Vargas Llosa for president. When Alberto Fujimori was elected president, Paniagua was part of the opposition, but became a strong opponent after Fujimori's auto-coup in April 1992.

== Presidency (2000–2001) ==
Fujimori was reelected once again in the controversial national elections of 2000. Paniagua was a prominent member of the opposition.

On 14 September the nation was rocked by evidence that Fujimori's security chief, Vladimiro Montesinos, had bribed an opposition congressman to switch to Fujimori's party, Perú 2000. Fujimori's support evaporated at this point, and he was forced to announce he would step down after new presidential elections in 2001. An OAS mission was sent to deal with the political crisis.

Fujimori's allies lost control of Congress after numerous defections to the opposition. On 15 November 2000, a majority of the Congress dismissed the acting President of the Peruvian Congress, a Fujimori supporter. After an internal discussion among the political forces, Paniagua was elected the new President of the Peruvian Congress. He was elected because all parties considered him to have a fair but strong character, needed in such times of crisis.

A few days later, Fujimori submitted his resignation by fax. However, Congress voted 62-9 to reject Fujimori's resignation and remove him from office on grounds that he was "permanently morally unfit." According to the line of succession, First Vice President Francisco Tudela should have succeeded to the presidency, but he had also resigned a few days before after breaking with Fujimori. Second Vice President Ricardo Márquez then claimed the presidency. However, Congress refused to recognize him since he was one of the few who were still loyal to Fujimori. When it became apparent that Congress would not allow Márquez to take office, he resigned as well. Therefore, since the President of Congress stood third in the line of succession, Paniagua became acting president.

Paniagua formed a Unity and National Reconciliation Government that received the support of almost all the political parties of the time. He then proceeded to form a broad-based cabinet, which involved non-partisan technologists and low-profile politicians. It was headed by former UN Secretary General Javier Pérez de Cuéllar as Prime Minister and Minister of Foreign Affairs, who was chosen to avoid the increasing political pressure from the different political parties. He also dismissed the remaining military commanders who had had any type of involvement with or political connection to Montesinos.

Paniagua had to work with Fujimori's Peru 2000 party in Congress, since it still was the most important political organization (even though it no longer had a majority). Additionally, during most of his period, an important number of the infamous Vladivideos were published and investigated, since most of them recorded acts of corruption involving politicians, members of the clergy and important businessmen.

Paniagua was also involved in the repeal of much of the anti-terrorist legislation enforced by Fujimori, which included trials by faceless judges and juries. This allowed the re-trial of several members of Shining Path, who were already in prison, in civilian courts instead of military ones. Paniagua also established a Truth and Reconciliation Commission to investigate the internal conflict in Peru.

== Post-presidency (2001–2006) ==
=== Later political career ===
When his time as President of the Republic came to an end, he transferred the government to the democratically elected president and winner of the national elections of 2001, Alejandro Toledo. In the same year, he was elected Secretary General of Acción Popular, replacing the long-time leader Fernando Belaúnde as the national leader of the political organization.

For a brief period of time, it was speculated that the Peruvian government would support his candidacy for Secretary General of the Organization of American States (OAS) in the 2005 Secretary General election. He declined this in order to participate in the 2006 election, as Frente de Centro's presidential candidate in an unsuccessful campaign, in which he came in fifth place, receiving 5.75% of the vote.

He became a member of the Club of Madrid .

=== Death ===
On 21 August 2006, he fell seriously ill and was hospitalized for a week with a respiratory infection. A congressman wrongly reported that he had died and Congress observed a moment of silence in his honor, but he had not died and his health had in fact improved. However, in early October 2006, the country learned from a medical spokesperson that Mr. Paniagua's condition had not improved significantly.

Valentín Paniagua died in the early hours of 16 October 2006 in a hospital in Lima at the age of 70.

== See also ==
- Politics of Peru
- List of presidents of Peru

== Notes ==
Political offices
Preceded by —	President of the Chamber of Deputies; July 1983 – July 1984	Succeeded by —
Preceded by Pattricio Ricketts Rey de Castro	Minister of Education; April 1984 – October 1984	Succeeded by Andrés Alfonso Cardo Franco
Preceded by Martha Hildebrandt	President of Congress; November 2000	Succeeded by Carlos Ferrero
Preceded by Alberto Fujimori	President of Peru (President of a Unity and National Reconciliation Government); November 2000 – July 2001	Succeeded by Alejandro Toledo
Party political offices
Preceded by Fernando Belaúnde	General Secretary of Acción Popular; August 2001 – 2006	Succeeded by Víctor Andrés García Belaúnde
