= San Marcos province =

Coordinates: 7°20′07″S 78°10′11″W

San Marcos
- Province
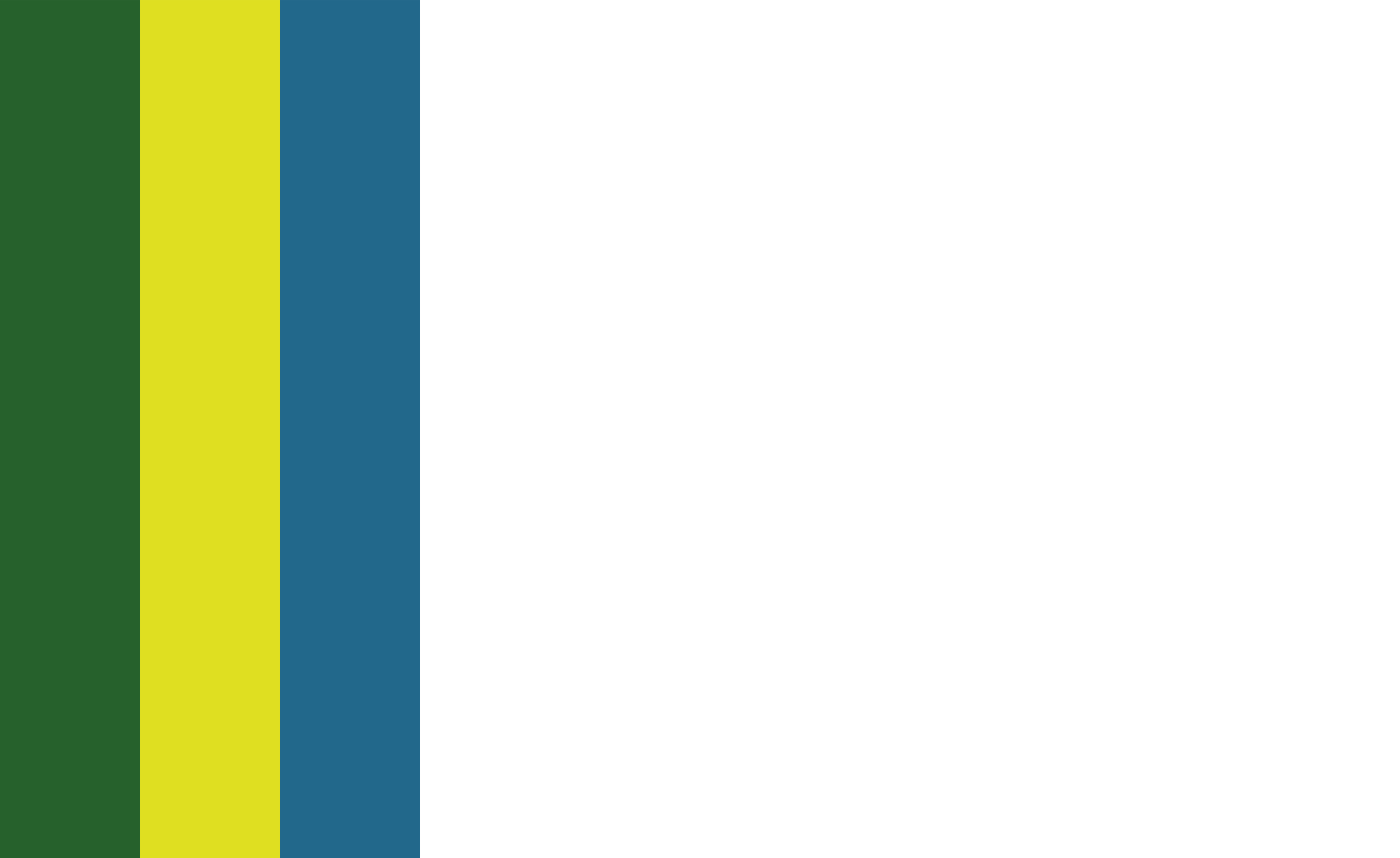
- Flag

- Location of San Marcos in the Cajamarca Region
- Country: Peru
- Region: Cajamarca
- Founded: December 11, 1982
- Capital: San Marcos

Government
  - Mayor: Flavio Carlos Machuca Romero

Area
  - Total: 1,362.32 km^{2} (525.99 sq mi)

Population
  - Total: 48,103
  - Density: 35.310/km^{2} (91.451/sq mi)
- UBIGEO: 0610
- Website: www.munisanmarcos.gob.pe

San Marcos is one of the thirteen provinces in the Cajamarca Region of Peru. It was created by Law No. 23508 on December 11, 1982, by president Fernando Belaunde Terry. It has a mountainous territory which varies in height from 1,500 to more than 4,000 meters (5,000–13,000 ft) above sea level. The province is crossed by several rivers, the most important of which is the Marañón.

== Political division ==
The province is divided into seven districts.

- Pedro Galvez (San Marcos)
- Chancay (Chancay)
- Eduardo Villanueva (La Grama)
- Gregorio Pita (Paucamarca)
- Ichocan (Ichocán)
- José Manuel Quiroz (Shirac)
- José Sabogal (Venecia)
