= San Marcos, Cajamarca =

San Marcos
- Town
- Nickname: Granero del Norte
- Location within Peru
- Coordinates: 7°20′07″S 78°10′11″W
- Country: Peru
- Region: Cajamarca
- Province: San Marcos
- District: Pedro Galvez

Government
  - Mayor: Flavio Carlos Machuca Romero
- Elevation: 2,251 m (7,385 ft)
- Time zone: UTC-5 (PET)

San Marcos is a town in Northern Peru, capital of San Marcos province in the region of Cajamarca. San Marcos has volleyball facilities located at Doña Fide's.

== Climate ==
San Marcos has a subtropical highland climate (Köppen: Cwb) with warm days and cool nights. San Marcos has a dry season from June to August.

Climate data for San Marcos, Cajamarca (1991–2020)
Month	Jan	Feb	Mar	Apr	May	Jun	Jul	Aug	Sep	Oct	Nov	Dec	Year
Mean daily maximum °C (°F)	25.7 (78.3)	25.3 (77.5)	24.9 (76.8)	25.5 (77.9)	25.7 (78.3)	25.2 (77.4)	24.9 (76.8)	25.3 (77.5)	25.8 (78.4)	26.0 (78.8)	26.4 (79.5)	25.8 (78.4)	25.5 (77.9)
Mean daily minimum °C (°F)	12.0 (53.6)	12.5 (54.5)	12.5 (54.5)	11.7 (53.1)	10.1 (50.2)	8.3 (46.9)	7.4 (45.3)	8.0 (46.4)	9.8 (49.6)	11.3 (52.3)	11.1 (52.0)	11.9 (53.4)	10.6 (51.1)
Average precipitation mm (inches)	98.1 (3.86)	118.8 (4.68)	148.4 (5.84)	76.2 (3.00)	30.6 (1.20)	7.2 (0.28)	3.9 (0.15)	3.1 (0.12)	27.0 (1.06)	79.0 (3.11)	80.6 (3.17)	111.3 (4.38)	784.2 (30.87)
Source: NOAA
