= Roger Guevara =

Peruvian politician (born 1988)

Governor of Cajamarca
- Incumbent
- Assumed office 1 January 2023
- Preceded by: Mesías Guevara

Personal details
- Born: 6 January 1988 (age 38)
- Party: We Are Peru (since 2021)

Roger Guevara Rodríguez (born 6 January 1988) is a Peruvian politician serving as governor of Cajamarca since 2023. From 2021 to 2022, he worked in the food distribution industry.
