= Popular Action (Peru) =

Political party in Peru

Popular Action Acción Popular
- Abbreviation: AP
- President: Julio Chávez Chiong
- General Secretary: Edmundo del Águila
- Founder: Fernando Belaúnde
- Founded: 7 July 1956; 70 years ago
- Preceded by: Democratic Youth Front
- Headquarters: Lima
- Ideology: Reformism; Populism; Conservatism; Liberalism; Moderatism; Catch-all
- Political position: Centre to centre-right; Historically: Centre-left
- Anthem: "Popular Action March"
- Congress: 0 / 130
- Governorships: 0 / 25
- Regional Councillors: 6 / 342
- Province Mayorships: 3 / 196
- District Mayorships: 61 / 1,874

Website
- accionpopular.com.pe
- Politics of Peru; Political parties; Elections; A: Some sources have described the position to still be centre-left.

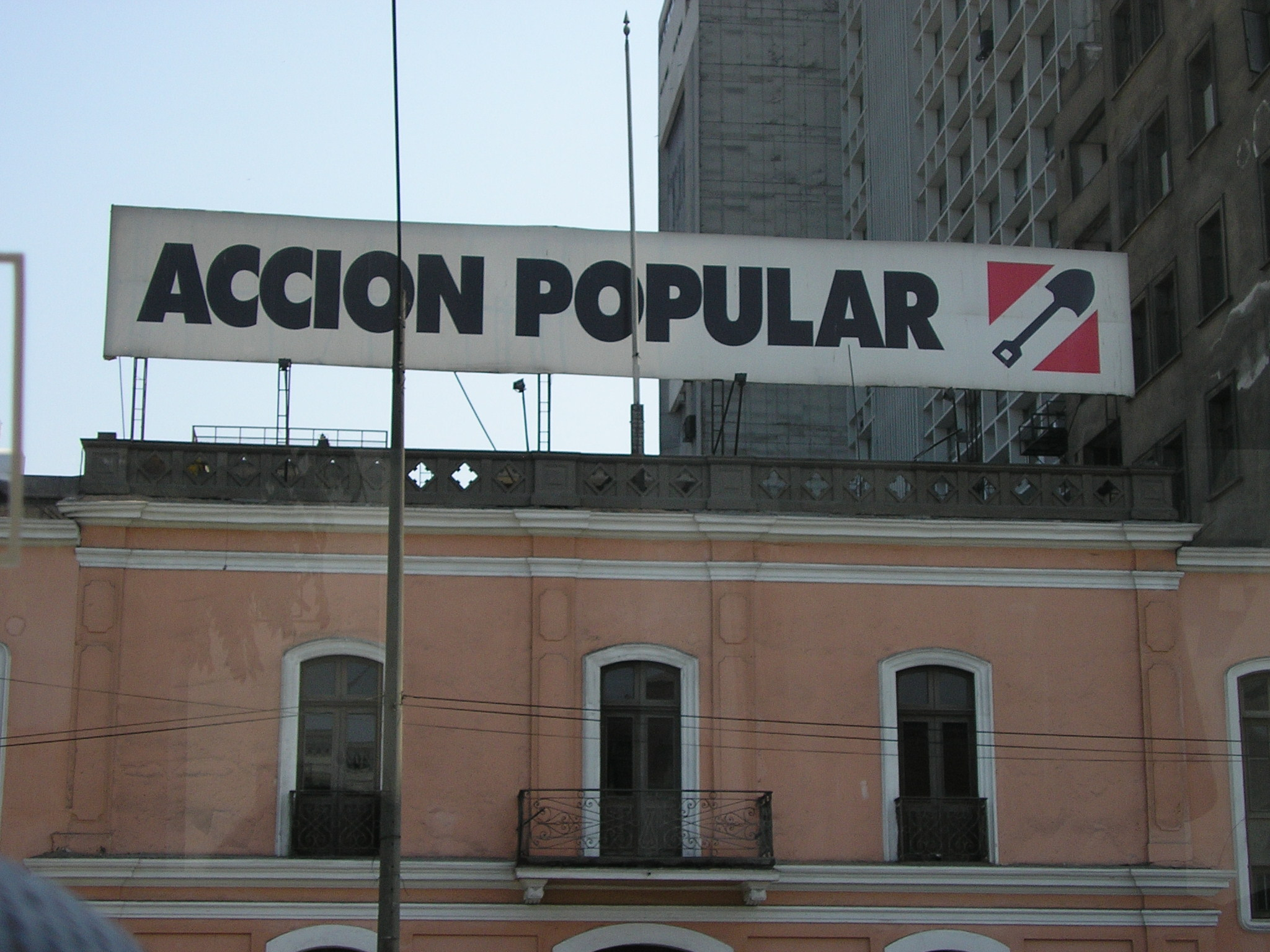
Acción Popular banner in Lima, Peru

Popular Action (Spanish: Acción Popular, AP) is a conservative, populist, and reformist political party in Peru, founded by former Peruvian president Fernando Belaúnde.

== History ==
=== Early history ===
Fernando Belaúnde founded Popular Action (Acción Popular) in 1956 as a reformist alternative to the status quo conservative forces and the populist American Popular Revolutionary Alliance party.

Although Belaúnde's message was not all that different from APRA's, his tactics were more inclusive and less confrontational. He was able to appeal to some of the same political base as APRA, primarily the middle class, but also to a wider base of professionals and white-collar workers. It also advocated scientific advancement and technocracy, a policy set that it took from the Progressive Social Movement, a splinter party which it eventually absorbed. The AP had significant electoral success, attaining the presidency in 1963 and 1980, but the party was more of an electoral machine for the persona of Belaúnde than an institutionalized organization. The AP was initially reckoned as a center-left party. However, by the 1980s, Peru's political spectrum had shifted sharply leftward, and the AP found itself on the center-right.

=== Later years ===
After AP's second administration, in 1985, the party was defeated by the APRA party, gaining only 6.4 percent of the vote. In 1990, AP participated in the elections as a part of the Democratic Front, a center-right coalition headed by Mario Vargas Llosa.

In 2000, Víctor Andrés García Belaúnde was selected as the presidential nominee, being the worst general election for AP, gaining only 0.42% of the popular vote. Only three AP congressman were elected. As many assume the election was a fraud, Fujimori resigned after the corruption of his government was revealed by the opposition.

AP member Valentín Paniagua would become President of the Congress in November 2000 for a few days and, after the fall of the Fujimori administration, became the interim President of the Republic, holding office from November 2000 to July 2001.

In the 8 April 2001 election, the party won 4.2% of the popular vote and three out of 120 seats in Congress.

Likewise, in 2002, regional elections were held for the first time, which aimed to elect Regional Presidents for the 25 departments of Peru. In that sense, party participation was quite high (15 political groups). In these elections, AP ranked sixth by number of votes.

For the 2006 national election, the party joined forces with We Are Peru and National Coordinator of Independents to form the Centre Front coalition. Paniagua was the presidential candidate, while the vice-presidential candidates belonged to AP's allies. The Center Front ended in the fifth place in the national election, with 5.6% of the popular vote.

For the 2011 national election, the party joined forces with We Are Peru and Possible Peru to form the Possible Peru Electoral Alliance. The presidential candidate was former Peru's president and leader of Possible Peru, Alejandro Toledo. The alliance ended in the fourth place in the national election, with 15.6% of the popular vote.

For the 2016 national election, the party ran alone for the first time since 2000, when Congressman Víctor Andrés García Belaúnde ran against the sitting president Alberto Fujimori, and it was the first time since 2006 that Popular Action participated with a party member as a presidential candidate when former President Valentín Paniagua ran for office. The presidential candidate was Alfredo Barnechea, journalist and political analyst, who won the party's primaries with 52% of the votes, defeating Mesías Guevara (40%), the party's president for the 2014–2018 term, the lawyer Beatríz Mejía (6%) and former Deputy Alejandro Montoya (2%). Popular Action ended in fourth place in the national election, with 6.97% of the popular vote. This was the best result for Popular Action since 1985. For the 2016–2021 term, AP had five congressmen out of 130 representing the party, until the snap election in 2020, when it increased its representation to 25 congressmen until the end of the 2016–2021 term. In the 2021 elections, Lescano placed 5th in a fractured race of 18 candidates while the party gained 16 seats for the 2021–2026 congressional term. On 26 July 2021, an alliance led by Popular Action member María del Carmen Alva successfully negotiated an agreement to gain control of Peru's Congress.

== Ideology and position ==
Popular Action has been as reformist, nationalist, populist, catch all, moderate, paternalistically conservative, conservative, Catholic-based, pro-capitalist, pro-business, neoliberal, liberal, and socially liberal. It has been labeled on the political scale as centre-right, centrist, centre-left, right-wing, left-wing, and radical left.

== Presidents of Peru from Popular Action ==
Belaúnde election poster 1980

- Fernando Belaúnde (1963–1968; 1980–1985)
- Valentín Paniagua (2000–2001)
- Manuel Merino (10–15 Nov. 2020)

== Electoral history ==
=== Presidential ===
Election	Candidate	First round		Second round		Result
Election	Candidate	Votes	%	Votes	%	Result
1956	Fernando Belaúnde	457,966	36.69			Lost ✗
1962	Fernando Belaúnde	544,180	32.21			Lost ✗
1963	Fernando Belaúnde	708,662	39.05			Won ✓
1980	Fernando Belaúnde	1,793,190	44.93			Won ✓
1985	Javier Alva Orlandini	472,627	7.26			Lost ✗
1990	Mario Vargas Llosa (Note: In coalition under Democratic Front)	2,163,323	32.57	2,708,291	37.62	Lost ✗
1995	Raúl Diez Canseco	122,383	1.64			Lost ✗
2000	Víctor Andrés García Belaúnde	46,523	0.42			Lost ✗
2001	Did not contest					N/A
2006	Valentín Paniagua (Note: In coalition under Centre Front)	706,156	5.75			Lost ✗
2011	Alejandro Toledo (Note: In coalition under Possible Peru Electoral Alliance)	2,289,561	15.63			Lost ✗
2016	Alfredo Barnechea	1,069,360	6.97			Lost ✗
2021	Yonhy Lescano	1,306,288	9.07			Lost ✗
2026	Did not contest					N/A

=== Congress of the Republic ===
Election	Leader	Senate				Chamber of Deputies				Position	Government
Election	Leader	Votes	%	Seats	+/–	Votes	%	Seats	+/–	Position	Government
1956	Fernando Belaúnde			5 / 53				21 / 182		3rd	Minority
1962	Fernando Belaúnde			16 / 55	▲11			61 / 186	▲40	▲2nd	Elections annulled
1963	Fernando Belaúnde			15 / 45	▼1			39 / 139	▼22	2nd	Minority government
1980	Fernando Belaúnde	1,694,952	40.92	26 / 60	▲11	1,413,233	38.92	98 / 180	▲59	▲1st	Majority
1985	Fernando Belaúnde	492,056	8.14	5 / 61	▼21	491,581	8.43	10 / 180	▼88	▼4th	Minority
1990	Fernando Belaúnde	1,772,953	32.06 (FREDEMO)	20 / 62	▲15	1,561,291	30.03 (FREDEMO)	62 / 180	▲52	▲1st	Minority

Election	Leader	Votes	%	Congress	+/–	Rank	Government
1992	Fernando Belaúnde	Boycotted		0 / 80	▼62	▼19th	Extra-parliamentary
1995	Fernando Belaúnde	146,018	3.34	4 / 120	▲4	▲6th	Minority
2000	Fernando Belaúnde	245,115	2.47	3 / 120	▼1	▼9th	Minority
2001	Fernando Belaúnde	393,433	4.18	3 / 120	0	▲7th	Minority
2006	Víctor Andrés García Belaúnde	760,261	7.07 (FC)	5 / 120	▲2	▲5th	Minority
2011	Javier Alva Orlandini	1,904,180	14.83 (AEPP)	5 / 130	▲1	▲3rd	Minority
2016	Mesías Guevara	877,734	7.20	5 / 130	0	▼6th	Minority
2020	Mesías Guevara	1,518,171	10.26	25 / 130	▲20	▲1st	Majority coalition
2021	Mesías Guevara	1,159,734	9.02	16 / 130	▼9	▼3rd	Minority
