= Víctor Andrés García Belaúnde =

Peruvian politician (born 1949)

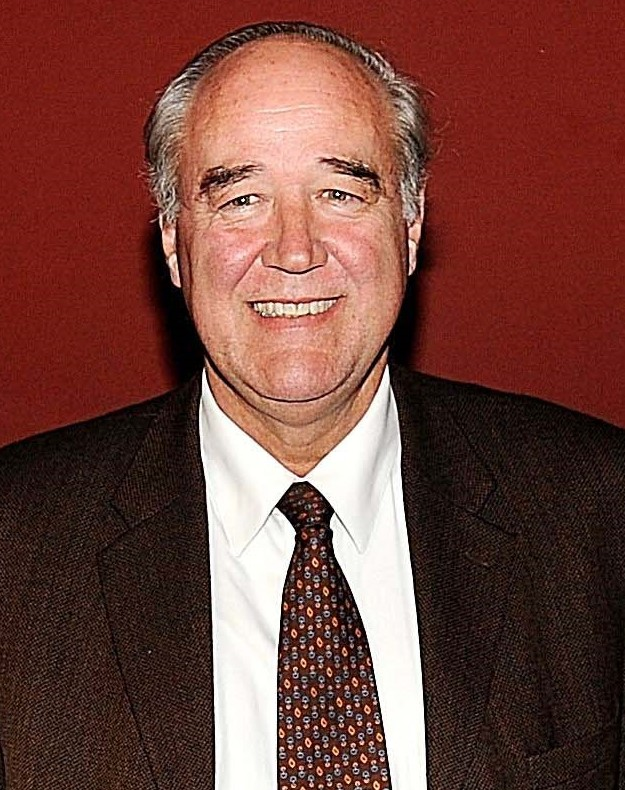

Member of Congress
- In office 26 July 2006 – 30 September 2019
- Constituency: Lima

Member of the Chamber of Deputies
- In office 26 July 1985 – 5 April 1992
- Constituency: Lima Region

President of Popular Action
- In office January 2004 – May 2009
- Preceded by: Valentín Paniagua
- Succeeded by: Javier Alva Orlandini

Personal details
- Born: Víctor Andrés García Belaúnde; 6 June 1949 (age 77) Lima, Peru
- Party: Popular Action
- Education: National University of San Marcos
- Profession: Lawyer

Víctor Andrés García Belaúnde (born 6 June 1949, in Lima), is a Peruvian lawyer and politician belonging to the Popular Action and a former Congressman representing Lima between 2006 and 2019. He was president of the Popular Action from 2004 to 2009.

== Early life and education ==
Víctor Andrés García descends from a family that has been linked to Peruvian politics for a long time. His great-grandfather General Pedro Diez Canseco was three times interim President of Peru in the 1860s. His grandfather, the influential thinker, writer and diplomat Víctor Andrés Belaúnde was President of the United Nations General Assembly from 1959 to 1960 and his uncle Fernando Belaúnde Terry was the founder of the Popular Action and twice democratically elected President (1963–1968 and 1980–1985). His brother, José Antonio García Belaúnde has served as foreign minister during the second administration of Alan García. His older brother, Domingo García Belaúnde, is also a prominent lawyer and constitutionalist, but not a politician.

After graduating from the Peruvian Naval School, García studied law at the University of Valladolid in Spain and the prestigious National University of San Marcos. He received his Licence in 1975.

== Political career ==
During his uncle's presidency, García was the Secretary General of the Council of Ministers.

=== Deputy ===
In the 1985 general election, García was elected to the Chamber of Deputies on his uncle's Popular Action (AP) list for a five-year term, representing the Lima Region. Parallel, he was secretary of the AP-led cabinet. In the 1990 general election, he was re-elected for a second term, representing the liberal-conservative FREDEMO-coalition comprising his Popular Action, the Christian People's Party and the Liberty Movement and served until authoritarian president Alberto Fujimori dissolved the Congress in a self-coup in 1992.

=== Presidential candidate (2000) ===
At the end of the Fujimori dictatorship, Víctor García was AP's presidential candidate for the 2000 general election without considerable success, placing ninth with 0.4% of the vote and Fujimori was subsequently re-elected in the runoff that was marred by electoral fraud.

=== Congressman ===
In the 2006 general election, García Belaúnde was elected Congressman representing Lima for the 2006–2011 term on the Center Front ticket, assembled by AP, We Are Peru and National Coordinator of Independents party. In Congress, he was the speaker of the Parliamentary Alliance, a joint group of Center Front, Possible Peru and, initially, the National Restoration Party lawmakers. In the 2011 general election, he was re-elected on the list of the Possible Peru Alliance, where his Popular Action party has now integrated. He was again re-elected in the 2016 general election and left office in 2019 following to the dissolution of the Congress by Martín Vizcarra. In 2017, he questioned the addendum to the Chinchero airport contract, as, in his opinion, it was harmful to the interests of the State. In this regard, he had a strong controversy with the then Vice President and Minister of Transport and Communications Martín Vizcarra, whom he described as a "sell-out country". In 2018, he ran for the presidency of Congress, leading a multiparty alliance that wanted to curb the hegemony of Fujimorism in the Board of Directors, but lost with a difference of 14 votes to Daniel Salaverry.

=== Party politics ===
From 2002 to 2003 he was vice president, of the Popular Action party and from January 2004 to May 2009 he became the president of the Popular Action party.
