= Centre Front =

Centre Front Frente de Centro
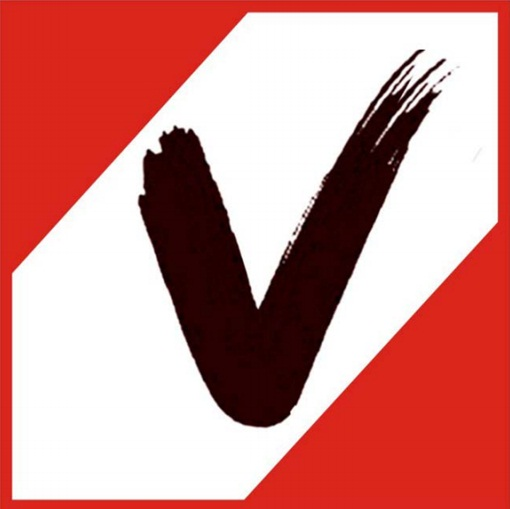
- Abbreviation: FC
- Leader: Víctor Andrés García Belaúnde
- Founded: 2005
- Dissolved: 2006
- Headquarters: Lima, Peru
- Ideology: Liberalism; Christian democracy
- Political position: Centre

The Centre Front (Spanish: Frente de Centro, FC), was a Peruvian political coalition formed by the parties Acción Popular (AP), Somos Perú (PDSP) and Coordinadora Nacional de Independientes (CNI) for the 2006 national election. Its leader and presidential candidate was the late Peruvian former president Valentín Paniagua Corazao but following his sudden death on October 16, 2006 the coalition was headed by President of the Acción Popular party, Víctor Andrés García Belaúnde. The alliance was unsuccessful in the presidential race, placing 5th. At the legislative elections held on 9 April 2006, the party won 7.1% of the popular vote and only 5 out of 120 seats in the Congress of the Republic.

== History ==
The electoral coalition was created to join forces for the 2006 election. As a result of the internal election, the following presidential ticket was chosen:

- For President: Valentín Paniagua Corazao (AP)
- For First Vice-President: Alberto Andrade Carmona (PDSP)
- For Second Vice-President: Gonzalo Aguirre Arriz (CNI)

Paniagua had become president of Congress in November 2000 for a few days before becoming the interim President of Peru from November 2000 to July 2001, following the resignation of Alberto Fujimori and his vice-presidents. Andrade is a former mayor of Lima from 1996 to 2002. Aguirre is an entrepreneur and a former member of National Unity. Both Andrade and Aguirre also ran for Congress, under candidate numbers 1 and 3 in the Front's list for Lima.

The coalition's logo, shows Peru's national colors in the background, in the style of Acción Popular's own logo, but replacing AP's shovel with a "V" similar to a check, as well as serving as the initial to Paniagua's first name and to the word for "victory" (victoria). At the legislative elections held on 9 April 2006, the party won 7.1% of the popular vote and only 5 out of 120 seats in the Congress of the Republic.

For the 2011 Peruvian general election, both Popular Action and We Are Peru joined the Peru Possible Alliance of ex-president Alejandro Toledo while National Coordinator of Independents (now known as All for Peru) joined the National Solidarity Alliance of ex-Lima Mayor Luis Castañeda.

== Election results ==
=== Presidential election ===
Year	Candidate	Party	Votes	Percentage	Outcome
2006	Valentín Paniagua	Centre Front AP-PDSP-TPP	706 156	5.75	5th

=== Election to the Congress of the Republic ===
Year	Votes	%	Seats	▲/▼	Position
2006	760 245	7.1%	5 / 120	▲5	Minority
