= Department of Cajamarca =

Department and region in Peru

Cajamarca Kashamarka (Quechua)
- Department
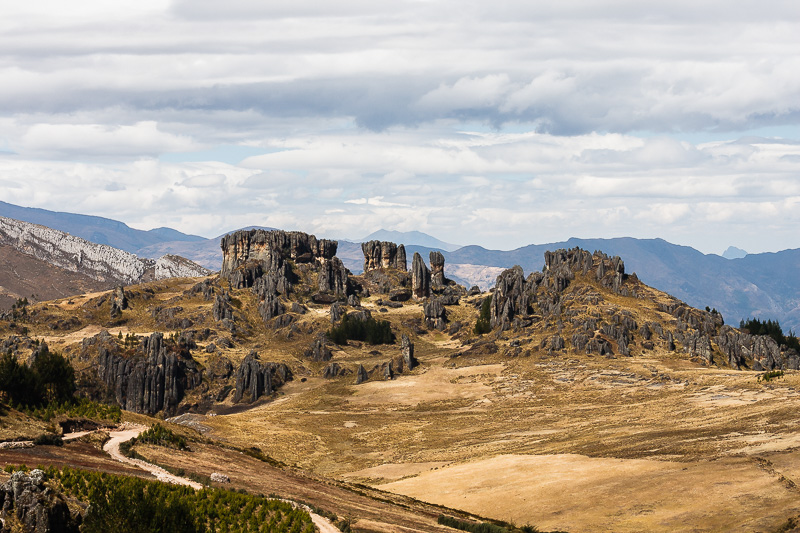
- Stone forest of Cumbemayo

- Flag Coat of arms
- Anthem: Anthem of Cajamarca Region
- Location of Cajamarca within Peru
- Coordinates: 6.61°S 78.78°W
- Country: Peru
- Capital: Cajamarca
- Provinces: List: Cajabamba; Cajamarca; Celendín; Chota; Contumazá; Cutervo; Hualgayoc; Jaén; San Ignacio; San Marcos; San Miguel; San Pablo; Santa Cruz

Government
  - Type: Regional Government
  - Governor: Roger Guevara
  - Senator: Segundo Tapia (FP)

Area
  - Total: 33,317.54 km^{2} (12,863.97 sq mi)
- Highest elevation: 4,496 m (14,751 ft)
- Lowest elevation: 420 m (1,380 ft)

Population (2025 census)
  - Total: 1,490,769
  - Density: 44.74427/km^{2} (115.8871/sq mi)
- Demonym: cajamarquino/a
- UBIGEO: 06
- Dialing code: 076
- ISO 3166 code: PE-CAJ
- Website: www.regioncajamarca.gob.pe

Cajamarca (Spanish pronunciation: [kaxaˈmaɾka]; Quechua: Kashamarka; Aymara: Qajamarka) is a department of Peru. It is located to the north of the country and shares a border with Ecuador. It is administered by a regional government. The capital is the city of Cajamarca, which has an elevation of 2,700 metres (8,900 ft) above sea level in the Andes Mountain Range, the longest mountain range in the world. Part of its territory includes the Amazon rainforest, the largest in the world.

== History ==
The oldest known irrigation canals in the Americas are located in the Nanchoc District of Cajamarca Department. The canals in the Zaña Valley have been radiocarbon dated to 3400 BCE, and possibly date to 4700 BCE. From the 6th to the 10th century the people of the Wari culture ruled earlier cultures in the highlands. They established the administrative center of Wiraquchapampa.

In the 15th century, the Incas conquered the territory, expanding their empire. They established their regional capital in what is now Cajamarca. The Incas in 1465 established a new province there to serve as a bridge to their later conquests.

Cajamarca had long been one of the oldest cities in South America when the Spanish arrived in their conquest of Peru.

== Political division ==
Map of provinces

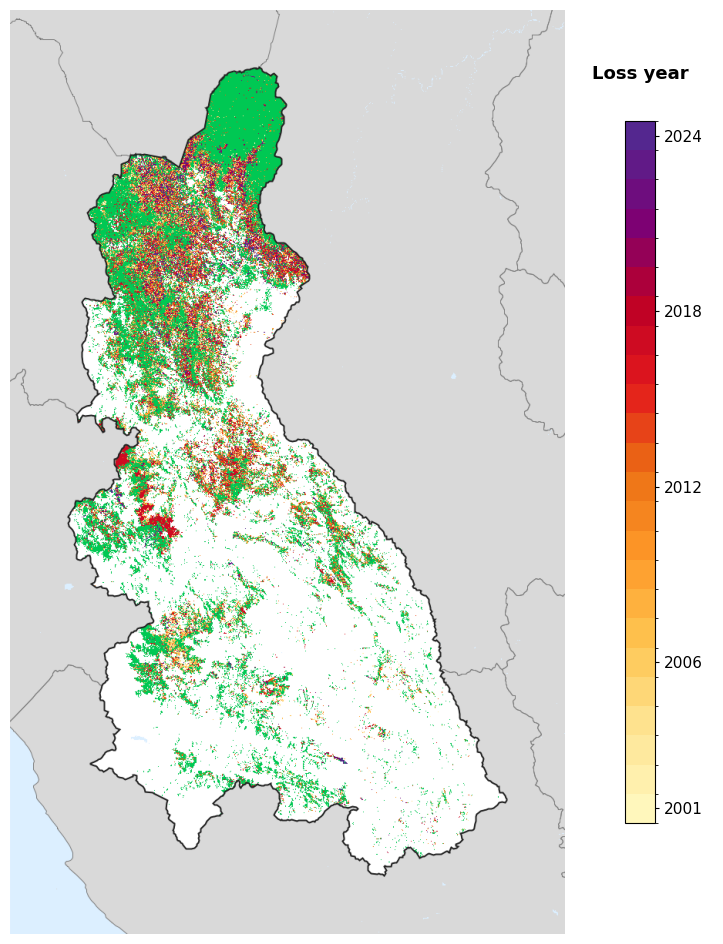
Tree-cover loss year in Cajamarca, 2001-2024, from the Global Forest Change dataset.

The Region is divided into 13 provinces.

Province (Capital)

1. Cajabamba (Cajabamba)
2. Cajamarca (Cajamarca)
3. Celendín (Celendín)
4. Chota (Chota)
5. Contumazá (Contumazá)
6. Cutervo (Cutervo)
7. Hualgayoc (Bambamarca)
8. Jaén (Jaén)
9. San Ignacio (San Ignacio)
10. San Marcos (San Marcos)
11. San Miguel (San Miguel de Pallaques)
12. San Pablo (San Pablo)
13. Santa Cruz (Santa Cruz de Succhubamba)

== Places of interest ==
- Bosques Nublados de Udima Wildlife Refuge
- Chancaybaños Reserved Zone

== Notable people ==
- Maxima Acuña, winner of the 2016 Goldman Environmental Prize
- Yma Sumac, notable exotica singer of the 1950s
- Pedro Castillo, President of Peru (2021–2022)
- José María Balcázar, President of Peru (february-july 2026)
