= Roberto Sánchez (Peruvian politician) =

Peruvian politician

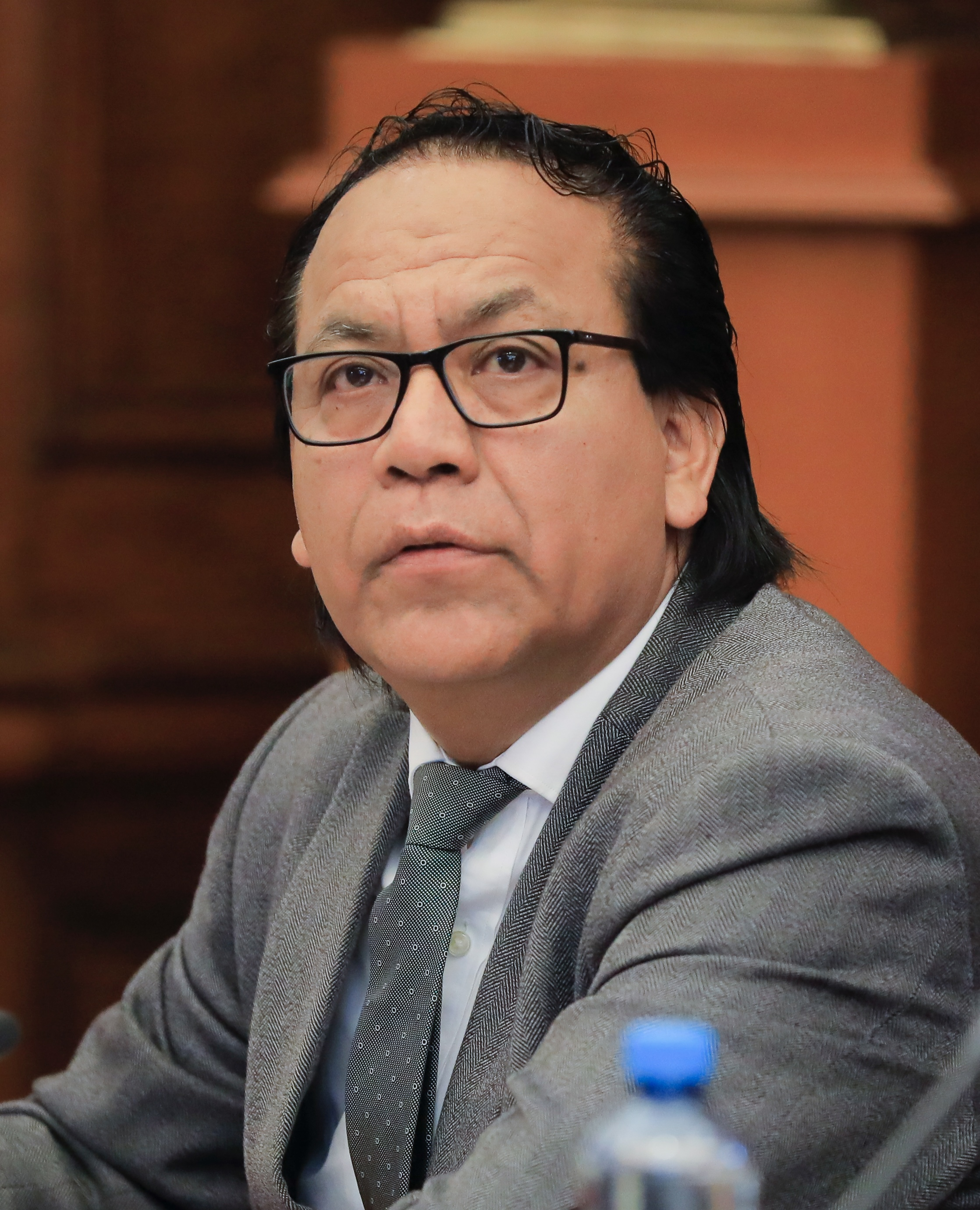
- Sánchez in 2024

President of Together for Peru
- Incumbent
- Assumed office 1 October 2017
- Preceded by: Position established

Minister of Foreign Trade and Tourism
- In office 29 July 2021 – 7 December 2022
- President: Pedro Castillo
- Prime Minister: Guido Bellido; Mirtha Vásquez; Héctor Valer; Aníbal Torres; Betssy Chávez
- Preceded by: Claudia Cornejo
- Succeeded by: Luis Fernando Helguero

Member of Congress
- In office 27 July 2021 – 26 July 2026
- Constituency: Lima

Personal details
- Born: Roberto Helbert Sánchez Palomino; 3 February 1969 (age 57) Huaral, Peru
- Party: JP (since 2017)
- Other political affiliations: PHP (2005–2017)
- Education: National University of San Marcos

Roberto Helbert Sánchez Palomino (born 3 February 1969) is a Peruvian politician and member of the political party Together for Peru. He has been a member of Congress from 2021 to 2026 and was Minister of Foreign Trade and Tourism for Pedro Castillo from 29 July 2021 until his resignation on 7 December 2022. He was a presidential candidate in the 2026 general election, but was narrowly defeated in the runoff by Keiko Fujimori.

== Early life and education ==
Sánchez was born in Huaral on 3 February 1969. He is the son of a barber and a laundress, both of whom were born in the Andean regions of Apurímac and Ayacucho.

As a teenager, he moved to Lima with the intention of becoming a priest, but later decided to study psychology. He has mentioned that he was part of liberation theology pastoral groups and worked as a psychologist with HIV patients.

He studied psychology at the National University of San Marcos, graduating in 1998 with a bachelor's degree and a professional degree in 2000, later becoming a psychotherapist for both individuals and groups. Sánchez later earned a master's degree in social policy at the Pontifical Catholic University of Peru.

== Political career ==
In the 2006 general elections, Sánchez ran for congress for the Decentralist Concertation for Lima, without success, obtaining 1,259 votes. In the 2006 regional and municipal elections, Sánchez was a candidate for mayor of Huaral for the Peruvian Humanist Party, but was unsuccessful in winning it. In 2020, he was appointed manager of Social Development of the Provincial Municipality of Huaral.

He was part of the Peruvian Humanist Party, later he joined Together for Peru, where he is the president as of 2022. Some former leaders of Together for Peru criticized Sánchez for his ability to establish leadership in the party, including the party's founder Yehude Simon.

=== Congressman and Minister ===
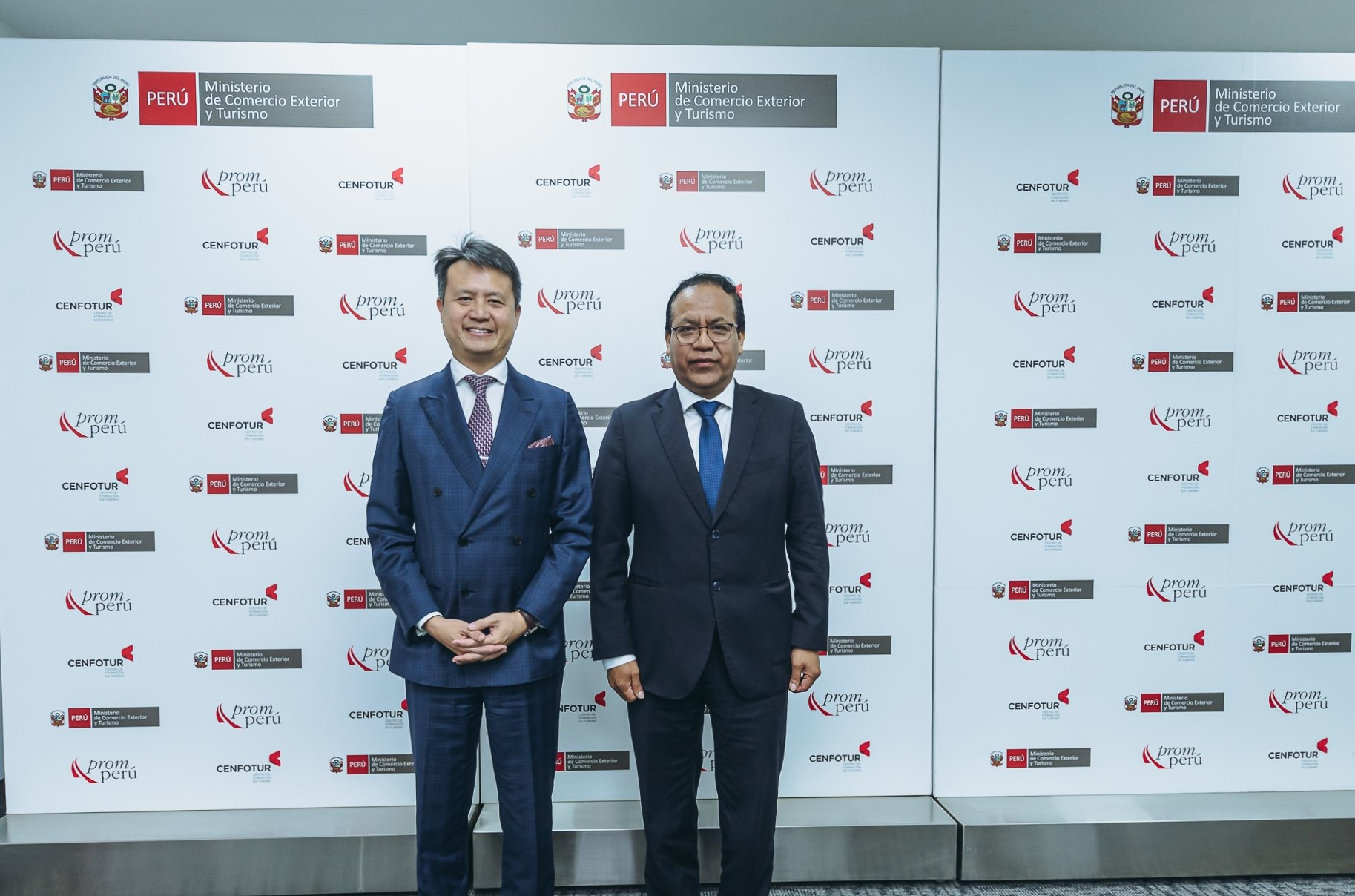
Sánchez in 2022 meeting with Daren Tang, the director general of the World Intellectual Property Organization

In the 2021 general elections, he was elected congressman for the Republic of Peru with Together for Peru, with 29,827 votes, for the 2021–2026 parliamentary period. On July 29, 2021, he was appointed Minister of Foreign Trade and Tourism in the government of Pedro Castillo. While serving as minister, he was criticized for personal expenses incurred for laundry and meals with public funds, though he registered these expenses as necessary for work meetings.

Roberto Sánchez maintains ties with the Peruvian rural world due to his involvement in territorial development policies in historically marginalized areas. During his time in government, he promoted community-based tourism in order to generate economic benefits for rural families. In Congress, where he served after the fall of the government in December 2022, he supported policies aimed at decentralization and strengthening local economies.

Sánchez was the only individual to serve throughout the entirety of Castillo's tenure.

=== Presidential candidacy ===
Sánchez ran for office to be the president of Peru in the 2026 Peruvian general election. At the time, Sánchez was charged with crimes of false statement in administrative procedure and falsification of information on contributions after his assets flucuated greatly between 2017 and 2026, raising concerns of illicit enrichment.

A defender of President Castillo, Sánchez said that the former president was a victim of a coup during the institutional crisis in 2022, promising to release Castillo from prison if elected. He also proposes a constituent assembly to create a new constitution of Peru. During his presidential campaign, Sánchez appeared at public events wearing a chotano hat that was given to him by Castillo when he visited the former president in prison. At a court hearing shortly before the election, Castillo called on the public to vote for Sánchez. Days before the election on 4 April 2026, La República reported that the chief of Opinion Studies at the Institute of Peruvian Studies, Patricia Zárate, observed that Sánchez was experiencing a similar growth in support in polls as Castillo did at the same period prior to the 2021 Peruvian general election.

In the first round of the election, which began on 12 April 2026, Sánchez saw his position move from 6th place in the first few days of tabulation to 2nd place by 15 April. The slow increase of Sánchez's position in the presidential race occurred due to the rural support of Sánchez, which required longer times to gather data from remote areas. This support was seen as a vindication of Castillo by rural supporters who saw Congress obstructing the former president's mandate.

Sánchez competed against Keiko Fujimori in a runoff vote scheduled on 7 June. He tapped Pedro Francke as his potential economic minister, a moderate economist who held positions with the Central Reserve Bank of Peru and the World Bank Group. Francke said that a Sánchez government would respect the autonomy of the Central Reserve Bank of Peru and would not engage in nationalizations, saying that exisiting economic contracts would remain recognized.

In the second round, after weeks of counting, Sanchez was defeated by Keiko Fujimori. He later called for demonstrations in protest of the result, while also making claims of voter fraud.

== Political positions ==
A member of the left wing, Sánchez supports universal access to education including university studies and increasing funding for education from 6% of GDP spending to 10%. He has called for public policy to be implemented with support of scientific data. On the economy, he has promoted formalizing the existing informal economy in Peru in order to provide a tax base for educational and local expenditures and a progressive tax.

Sánchez is additionally described as a progressive.

== Electoral history ==
Year	Position	Party	Votes	Percentage	Result
2006	Congressman for Lima	Decentralization Coalition	1,259	0.77%	Lost
2006	Mayor of Huaral	Peruvian Humanist Party	2,327	2.91%	Lost
2020	Congressman for Lima and Residents Abroad	Together for Peru	33,720	4.97%	Lost
2021	Congressman for Lima	Together for Peru	29,825	6.58%	Elected
2026	President of Peru	Together for Peru	9,173,755	49.87%	Lost
2026	Deputy for Lima	Together for Peru	15,823	3.29%	Lost

Party political offices
New title	President of Together for Peru; 2017–present	Incumbent
Preceded by Verónika Mendoza	JP nominee for President of Peru; 2026	Most recent
Political offices
Preceded by Claudia Cornejo	Minister of Foreign Trade and Tourism; 2021–2022	Succeeded by Luis Fernando Helguero
