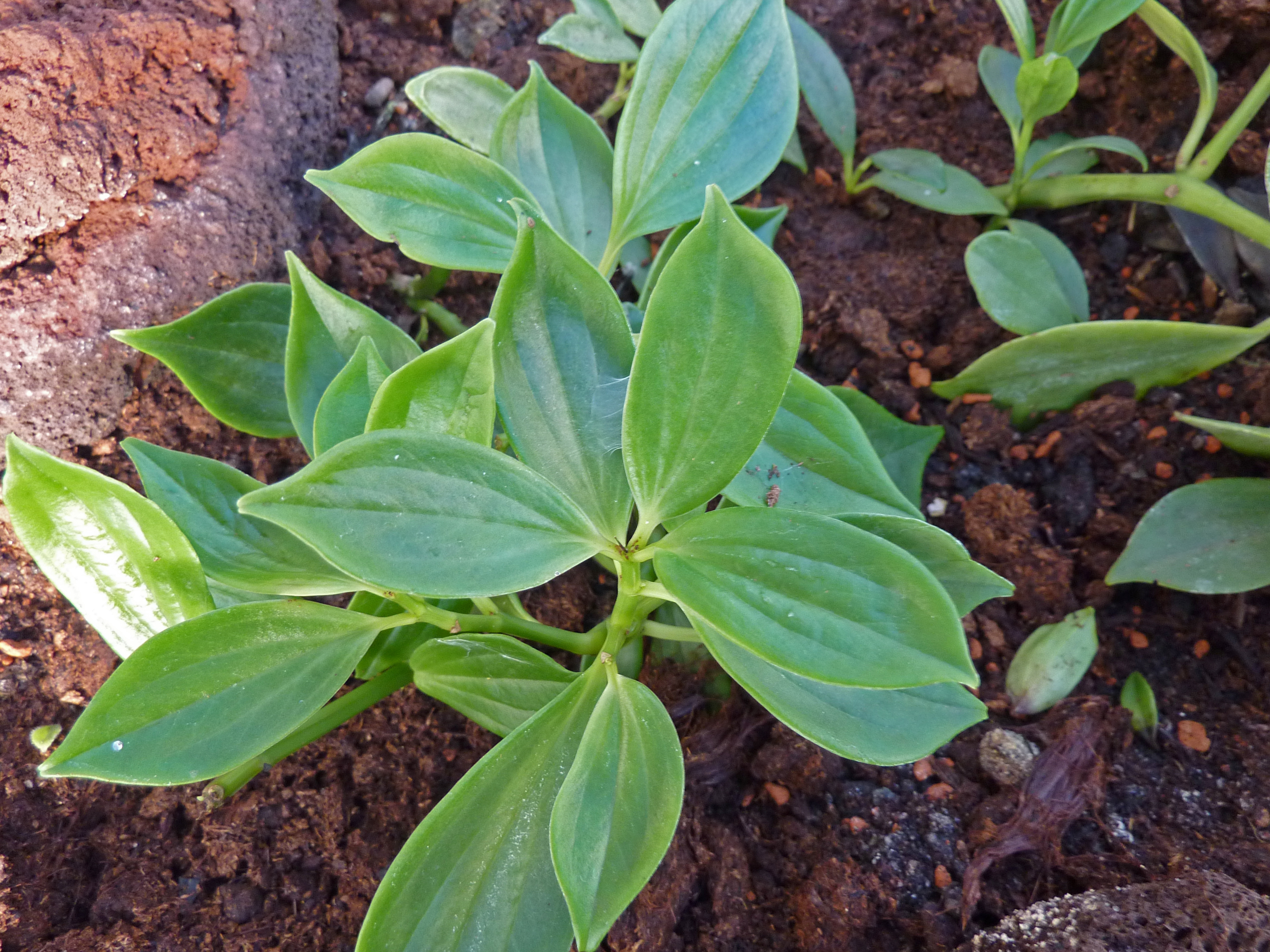
- Peperomia weberbaueri in the Botanical Garden, Berlin

Scientific classification
- Kingdom: Plantae
- Clade: Embryophytes
- Clade: Tracheophytes
- Clade: Spermatophytes
- Clade: Angiosperms
- Clade: Magnoliids
- Order: Piperales
- Family: Piperaceae
- Genus: Peperomia
- Species: P. weberbaueri

Binomial name
- Peperomia weberbaueri C.DC.

= Peperomia weberbaueri =

Species of flowering plant in Peru

Peperomia weberbaueri is a species of Peperomia plant native to Peru. Some specimens can be found at an altitude of 1,600 m (5,200 ft) in the Amazon.

== Etymology ==
The species' epithet weberbaueri came from the surname of German naturalist and botanist Augusto Weberbauer. Weberbauer contributed to the exploration of new plant species of Peru and Andes.
