= Permanent Representative of Peru to the United Nations =

- Great Seal of Peru
- Ministry of Foreign Affairs; 820 2nd Ave, Suite 1600, New York City
- Appointer: The president of Peru
- Inaugural holder: Carlos Holguín de Lavalle
- Formation: March 1947
- Abolished: December 7, 2022
- Website: Permanent Representation of Peru before the UN

The permanent representative of Peru to the United Nations is the permanent representative of Peru to the United Nations.

Peru is a founding member of the United Nations and has sent permanent representatives since March 1947. Peruvian diplomat Javier Pérez de Cuéllar served as Secretary-General of the United Nations from 1982 to 1991.

== List of representatives ==
Name	Portrait	Term begin	Term end	President	Notes
Carlos Holguín de Lavalle		March 1947	April 1957	José Luis Bustamante y Rivero	Ambassador and permanent representative
Carlos Mackehenie de la Fuente		July 1957	June 1969	Manuel Prado Ugarteche	Ambassador and permanent representative
Manuel Maúrtua		July 1969	October 1970	Juan Velasco Alvarado	Ambassador and permanent representative
Javier Pérez de Cuéllar		February 1971	October 1975	Juan Velasco Alvarado	Ambassador and permanent representative
Carlos Alzamora Traverso		November 1975	October 1978	Francisco Morales Bermúdez	Ambassador and permanent representative
Juan José Calle y Calle		March 1980	August 1982	Fernando Belaúnde	Ambassador and permanent representative
Celso Pastor de la Torre		October 1982	July 1983	Fernando Belaúnde	Ambassador and permanent representative
Javier Arias Stella		September 1983	July 1985	Fernando Belaúnde	Ambassador and permanent representative
Carlos Alzamora Traverso		August 1985	July 1989	Alan García	Ambassador and permanent representative
Ricardo Luna Mendoza		August 1989	November 1992	Alan García	Ambassador and permanent representative
Fernando Guillén Salas		December 1992	February 1999	Alberto Fujimori	Ambassador and permanent representative
Francisco Tudela		March 1999	March 2000	Alberto Fujimori	Ambassador and permanent representative
Jorge Luis Valdez Carrillo		July 2000	September 2001	Alberto Fujimori	Ambassador and permanent representative
Oswaldo de Rivero		September 2001	July 2006	Alberto Fujimori	Ambassador and permanent representative
Jorge Voto-Bernales Gatica		October 2006	April 2009	Alan García	Ambassador and permanent representative
Gonzalo Gutiérrez Reinel		May 2009	September 2011	Alan García	Ambassador and permanent representative
Enrique Armando Román Morey		September 2011	September 2013	Ollanta Humala	Ambassador and permanent representative
Gustavo Meza-Cuadra Velásquez		October 2013	October 2019	Ollanta Humala	Ambassador and permanent representative
Néstor Popolizio		December 2019	2021?	Martín Vizcarra	Ambassador and permanent representative
Manuel Rodríguez Cuadros		September 1, 2021	December 7, 2022	Pedro Castillo	Ambassador and permanent representative. He quit as a result of the 2022 Peruvian self-coup attempt.
Luis Enrique Chávez Basagoitia		N/A	N/A	Pedro Castillo	Chávez was elected in August 2022 but the supreme resolution that named him as Rodríguez's successor was left without effect on October 19 of the same year.
Enrique Román Morey		July 17, 2024	October 10, 2025	Dina Boluarte	

== See also ==
- Peru and the United Nations
- Permanent Representative of Peru to the Organization of American States
- List of ambassadors of Peru to the European Union
- Permanent Delegate of Peru to UNESCO
