= Fuerza Democrática =

Fuerza Democrática can refer to:

- Democratic Force (Costa Rica)
- Democratic Force (Peru)
