= Regional Government of Lambayeque =

Regional government in Peru

- Gobierno Regional de Lambayeque

Regional Government overview
- Formed: January 1, 2003; 22 years ago
- Jurisdiction: Department of Lambayeque
- Website: Government site

The Regional Government of Lambayeque (Spanish: Gobierno Regional de Lambayeque; GORE Lambayeque) is the regional government that represents the Department of Lambayeque. It is the body with legal identity in public law and its own assets, which is in charge of the administration of provinces of the department in Peru. Its purpose is the social, cultural and economic development of its constituency. It is based in the city of Chiclayo.

== List of representatives ==
Governor	Political party	Period
Yehude Simon	Union for Peru	January 1, 2003–December 31, 2006
Yehude Simon	Peruvian Humanist Party	January 1, 2007–March 9, 2009
Nery Saldarriaga de Kroll	Peruvian Humanist Party	April 15, 2009–December 31, 2010
Humberto Acuña	Alliance for Progress	January 1, 2011–December 31, 2014
Humberto Acuña	Alliance for Progress	January 1, 2015–December 31, 2018
Anselmo Lozano Centurión	Podemos Perú	January 1, 2019–January 27, 2021
Oscar Carpena	Podemos Perú	February 3, 2021–May 22, 2021
Luis Díaz Bravo	Podemos Perú	May 22, 2021–December 31, 2022
Jorge Pérez Flores	We Are Peru	January 1, 2023–Incumbent

== See also ==
- Regional Governments of Peru
- Department of Lambayeque
