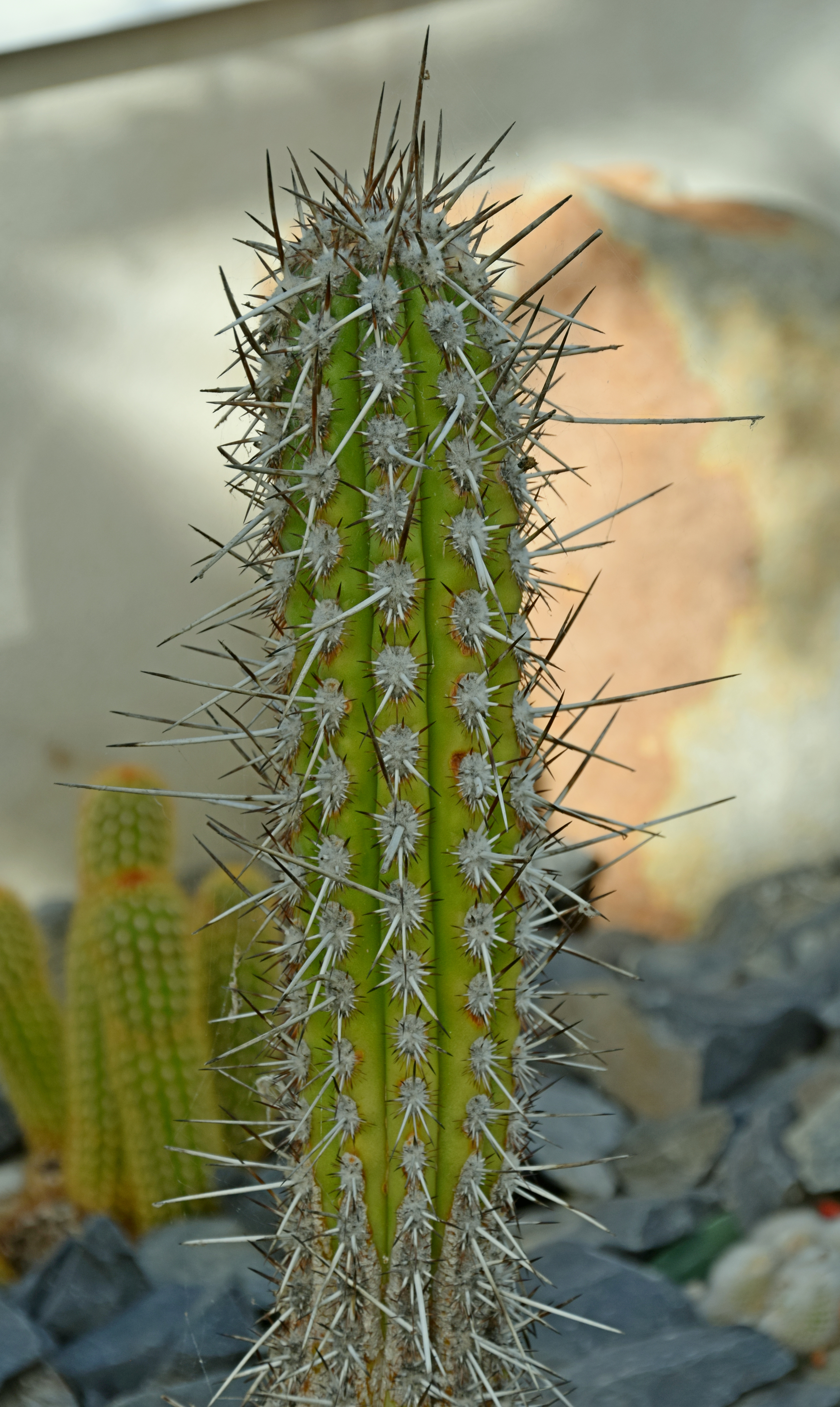

Conservation status
- Least Concern (IUCN 2.3)

Scientific classification
- Kingdom: Plantae
- Clade: Tracheophytes
- Clade: Angiosperms
- Clade: Eudicots
- Order: Caryophyllales
- Family: Cactaceae
- Subfamily: Cactoideae
- Genus: Weberbauerocereus
- Species: W. weberbaueri

Binomial name
- Weberbauerocereus weberbaueri (K.Schum. ex Vaupel) Backeb. 1958

Synonyms
- Weberbauerocereus torataensis F.Ritter; Haageocereus weberbaueri (K.Schum. ex Vaupel) D.R.Hunt 1987; Echinopsis weberbaueri (K.Schum. ex Vaupel) Anceschi & Magli 2013

= Weberbauerocereus weberbaueri =

Species of plant

Weberbauerocereus weberbaueri is a species of Weberbauerocereus from Peru.

== Description ==
Weberbauerocereus weberbaueri grows as a shrub with numerous, upright or ascending, gray-green shoots with a diameter of 6 to 10 cm (2.4 to 3.9 in) that branch from the base and reach heights of up to 4 meters. There are around 15 to 22 slightly humpbacked ribs. The areoles on it are close together, reach a diameter of up to 8 mm (0.31 in) and are covered with long, grayish yellow wool. The six to eight strong central spines are brownish and up to 6 cm (2.4 in) long. The approximately 20 thin, yellowish-brown radial spines are 1 to 1.5 cm (0.39 to 0.59 in) long.

The tubular to somewhat funnel-shaped, slightly zygomorphic flowers appear near the tips of the shoots, open at night and remain open until the next morning. They are 5.2 to 10.3 cm (2.0 to 4.1 in) long. Its greenish-brown flower tube is slightly curved and covered with short brown hairs. The flower bracts are white to reddish brown to pinkish red. The fruits are green, yellow, yellowish orange to orange-red and reach a diameter of up to 4 cm (1.6 in).

== Distribution ==
Weberbauerocereus weberbaueri is widespread in the Arequipa department of Peru at altitudes of 2000 to 3000 meters.

== Taxonomy ==
The first description as Cereus weberbaueri was made in 1913 by Friedrich Karl Johann Vaupel. The specific epithet weberbaueri honors the Prussian biologist August Weberbauer. Curt Backeberg placed the species in the genus Weberbauerocereus in 1957. Further nomenclature synonyms are Haageocereus weberbaueri (K.Schum. ex Vaupel) D.R.Hunt (1987) and Echinopsis weberbaueri (K.Schum. ex Vaupel) Anceschi & Magli (2013).
