= Weberbauerocereus churinensis =

Conservation status
- Least Concern (IUCN 2.3)

Scientific classification
- Kingdom: Plantae
- Clade: Tracheophytes
- Clade: Angiosperms
- Clade: Eudicots
- Order: Caryophyllales
- Family: Cactaceae
- Subfamily: Cactoideae
- Genus: Weberbauerocereus
- Species: W. churinensis

Binomial name
- Weberbauerocereus churinensis F.Ritter

Synonyms
- Echinopsis churinensis (F.Ritter) Molinari 2015; Haageocereus churinensis (F.Ritter) P.V.Heath 1995

Species of plant

Weberbauerocereus churinensis is a species of cactus in the genus Weberbauerocereus, native to Peru.

== Description ==
Weberbauerocereus churinensis grows as a shrub with more or less upright, cylindrical shoots that branch out from the base and reach heights of up to 2 meters. The shoots have a diameter of up to 5 cm (2.0 in). The 18 to 20 blunt ribs are weakly notched. The areoles have 40 to 60 spines are difficult to distinguish between central and peripheral thorns that are light orange-yellow, often hair-like and up to 1 cm (0.39 in) long. One or two spines are usually longer, up to 3 cm (1.2 in) long. The flowering area of the shoots is covered with bristles that are 2 to 4 cm (0.79 to 1.57 in) long.

The flowers are strongly fragrant, more or less radially symmetrical standing horizontally from the shoot, up to 12 cm (4.7 in) long. The flower tube is reddish and covered with dark hairs. The flower bracts are white at their base and pink at their tip. The spherical fruits are dirty green to reddish and reach a diameter of up to 4 cm (1.6 in). They are covered in dark hair.

== Distribution ==
Weberbauerocereus churinensis is widespread in the Lima region of Peru in the valley of the Río Huaura near Churín at elevations of 2400 to 3000 meters.

== Taxonomy ==
The first description was made in 1962 by Friedrich Ritter. The botanical name of the genus honors the Prussian biologist August Weberbauer. Nomenclature synonyms are Haageocereus churinensis (F.Ritter) P.V.Heath (1995) and Echinopsis churinensis (F.Ritter) Molinari (2015).
