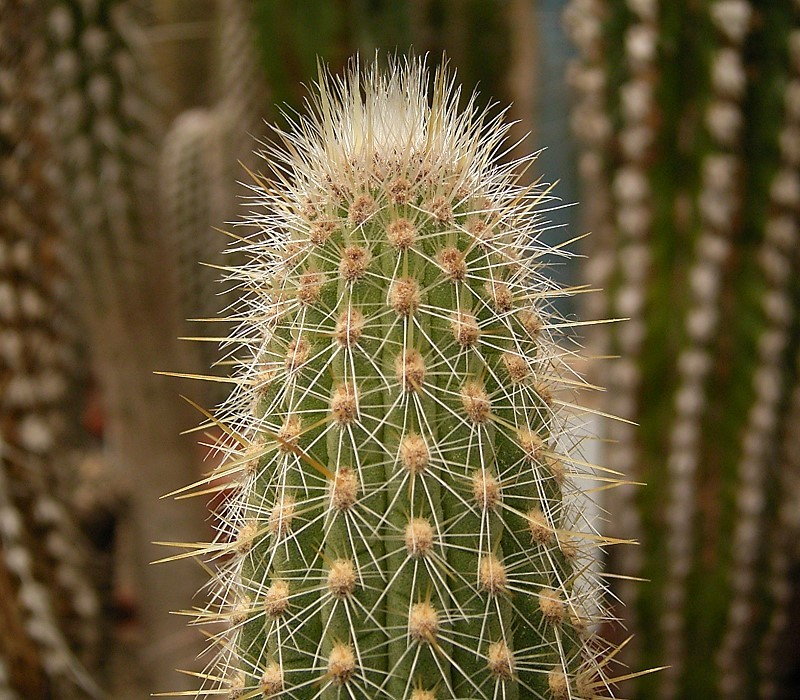
- Weberbauerocereus albus

Scientific classification
- Kingdom: Plantae
- Clade: Tracheophytes
- Clade: Angiosperms
- Clade: Eudicots
- Order: Caryophyllales
- Family: Cactaceae
- Subfamily: Cactoideae
- Tribe: Cereeae
- Subtribe: Trichocereinae
- Genus: Weberbauerocereus; Backeb.

Type species
- Weberbauerocereus weberbaueri

Species
- See text.

Synonyms
- Meyenia Backeb., nom. illeg.

= Weberbauerocereus =

Species of plant

Weberbauerocereus is a genus of ceroid cactus, considered to be intermediate between the genera Trichocereus and Cleistocactus. The genus is named after Augusto Weberbauer because of his extensive research in the Peruvian Andes. The genus is native to Bolivia and Peru.

== Description ==
The species of the genus Weberbauerocereus grow shrub-like to tree-like, branching at the base or above. They sometimes form tribes. The columnar shoots are erect or arching and sometimes climbing. Thorns, which are often strong, emerge from the white to yellowish, woolly areoles.

The large, tubular to bell-shaped flowers are whitish, brownish pink or reddish and usually open at night. The pericarpel and floral tube are densely covered with scales and hair.

The spherical, greenish-purple to orange-yellow fruits have a diameter of 3 to 5 centimeters and are covered with conspicuous hairs. The remainder of the flower is persistent, the pulp is white. The fruits contain black, shiny seeds.

== Species ==
As of October 2025, Plants of the World Online accepted the following species:

Image	Scientific name	Distribution
	Weberbauerocereus albus F.Ritter	Peru.
	Weberbauerocereus cephalomacrostibas (Werderm. & Backeb.) F.Ritter	Peru.
	Weberbauerocereus churinensis F.Ritter	Peru.
	Weberbauerocereus cuzcoensis Kníže	Peru.
	Weberbauerocereus madidiensis Quispe & A.Fuentes	Bolivia (La Paz)
	Weberbauerocereus rauhii Backeb.	Peru.
	Weberbauerocereus weberbaueri (K.Schum. ex Vaupel) Backeb.	Peru.
	Weberbauerocereus winterianus F.Ritter	Peru.
