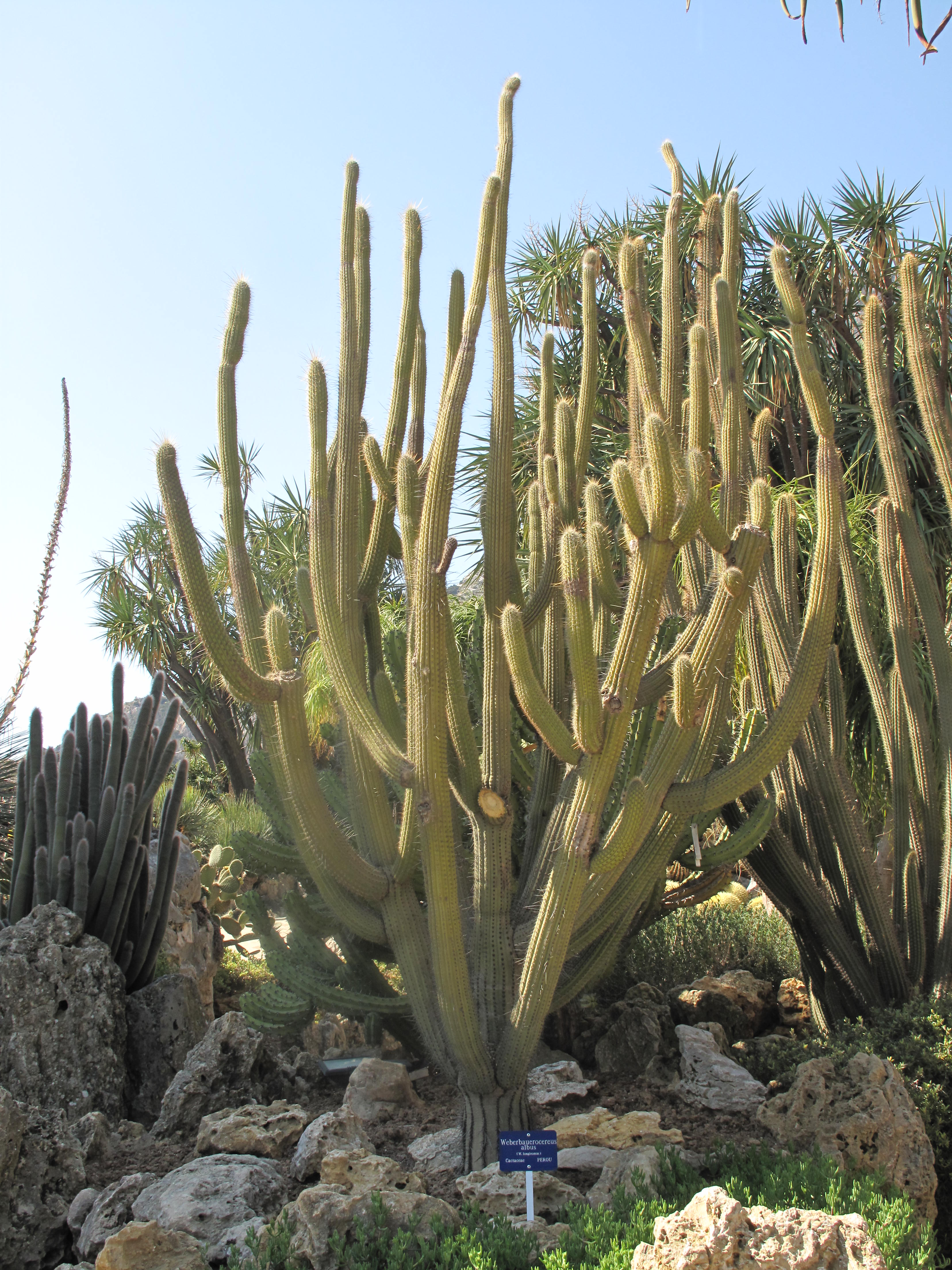

Conservation status
- Least Concern (IUCN 2.3)

Scientific classification
- Kingdom: Plantae
- Clade: Tracheophytes
- Clade: Angiosperms
- Clade: Eudicots
- Order: Caryophyllales
- Family: Cactaceae
- Subfamily: Cactoideae
- Genus: Weberbauerocereus
- Species: W. albus

Binomial name
- Weberbauerocereus albus F.Ritter 1962

Synonyms
- Haageocereus albus (F.Ritter) P.V.Heath 1995; Haageocereus longicomus (F.Ritter) P.V.Heath 1995; Weberbauerocereus longicomus F.Ritter 1962

= Weberbauerocereus albus =

Species of plant

Weberbauerocereus albus is a species of Weberbauerocereus from Peru.

== Description ==
Weberbauerocereus albus grows like a tree with straight, usually upright, gray-green shoots that branch out in the lower third and reaches heights of up to 6 meters with a diameter of 8 cm (3.1 in). The branches have 15 to 18 ribs are 1 cm (0.39 in) high and extremely blunt with brown areoles. The areoles have one to two central spines and 15 to 25 radial spines arise from them. The very strong, light brownish-yellow central spines are subulate and 5 to 10 mm (0.20 to 0.39 in) long. The light yellow to brownish yellow radial spines are up to 10 mm (0.39 in) long with the lowest of them are finer. In the flowering areas, the shape of the thorns change and they eventually become hairs that are up to 10 cm (3.9 in) long.

The somewhat zygomorphic and somewhat fragrant flowers open at night but remain open until the next morning. They are up to 12 cm (4.7 in) long and have a diameter of 5.5 to 7.5 cm (2.2 to 3.0 in) with bracts are white to pink. The spherical fruits are greenish to reddish and reach a diameter of up to 3 cm (1.2 in). They are densely covered with wool.

== Distribution ==
Weberbauerocereus albus is distributed in the Peruvian regions of Cajamarca and Ancash at altitudes of 2000 to 3000 meters.

== Taxonomy ==
The first description of the plant was made in 1962 by Friedrich Ritter. The specific epithet albus comes from Latin and means 'white'. Nomenclature synonyms are Haageocereus albus (F.Ritter) G.D.Rowley (1982) and Haageocereus albus (F.Ritter) P.V.Heath (1995, nom. illeg.).
