= Alberto Borea =

Peruvian lawyer and politician

Alberto Borea Odría
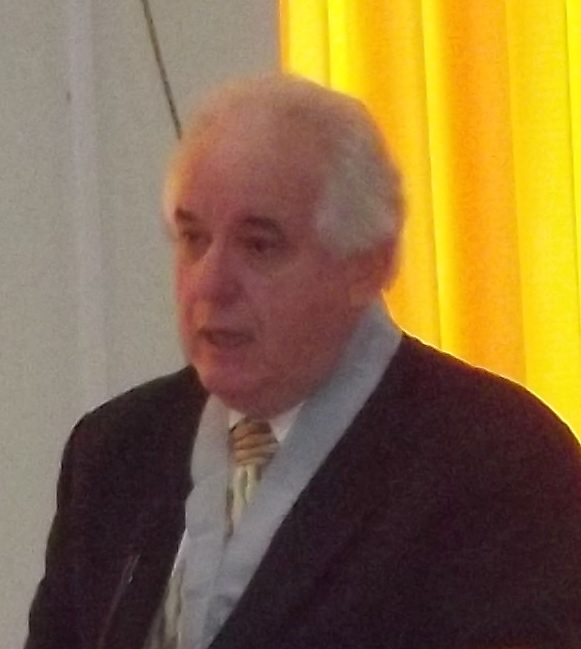

Permanent Representative of Peru to the Organization of American States
- In office 23 March 2004 – 5 August 2005
- President: Alejandro Toledo
- Preceded by: Eduardo Ferrero Costa
- Succeeded by: Fernando de la Flor Arbulu

Member of the Senate
- In office 26 July 1990 – 5 April 1992
- Constituency: National

Member of the Chamber of Deputies
- In office 26 July 1985 – 26 July 1990
- Constituency: Lima

Personal details
- Born: 1 December 1951 (age 74) Lima, Peru
- Party: People's Liberty
- Other political affiliations: Fuerza Democrática (2004-2006); Liberty Movement; Christian People's Party
- Education: Pontifical Catholic University of Peru; National University of San Marcos, Lima
- Occupation: sociologist, politician, member of Peruvian Congress

Alberto Borea Odría is a Peruvian lawyer and politician. He was Fuerza Democrática's presidential candidate for the 2006 national election.

He was Deputy from 1985 to 1990 and Senator from 1990 to 1992, when Alberto Fujimori dissolved the parliament. Later that year he participated in a failed coup attempt, led by General Jaime Salinas Sedó. From 2004 to 2005 he represented Peru at the Organization of American States. In the 2006 presidential elections he was considered to be a very minor candidate and received 0.2% of the vote, coming in 13th place. He is attempting to run again in 2016, but he is not a real contender. On December 20, 2017, at the Peruvian Congress, he defended President Pedro Pablo Kuscinsky from accusations of being morally unfit, his brilliant defence yielding a totally unexpected positive result, as there were not enough votes cast to impeach him.
