= Claudia Cornejo =

Peruvian Politician

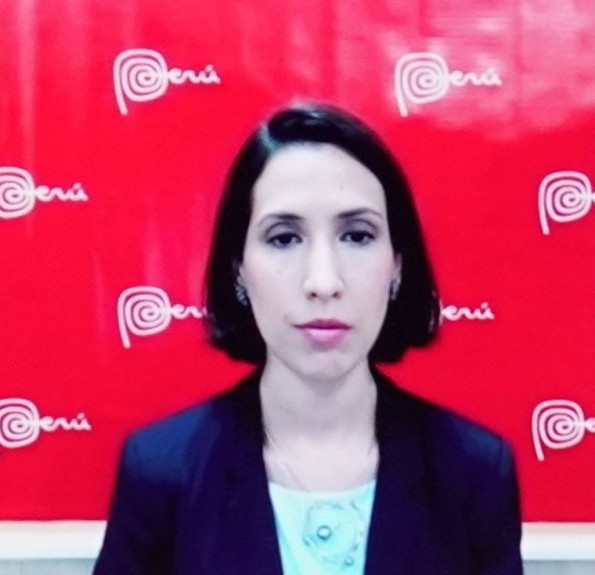
- Born: October 3, 1981 (age 44); Peru
- Occupation: Politician
- Predecessor: María Seminario
- Successor: Roberto Sánchez

Claudia Eugenia Cornejo Mohme (born October 3, 1981) is a Peruvian politician who served as Minister of Foreign Trade and Tourism from November 18, 2020, to July 28, 2021, during the government of President Francisco Sagasti.

== Biography ==
Claudia Eugenia Cornejo Mohme was born in Lima, Peru, on October 3, 1981. She is the daughter of María Eugenia Mohme Seminario and Fernando Cornejo Herrera. She is the granddaughter of journalist and politician Gustavo Mohme Llona.

She completed her secondary education at San Silvestre School in Lima. She later studied political science and government at Lafayette College in Pennsylvania, United States, where she obtained a bachelor's degree. She subsequently earned a master's degree in political communication from the London School of Economics and Political Science and completed studies in commercial management at the University of Piura.

Cornejo began her professional career in 2002 at the Ministry of Foreign Trade and Tourism (MINCETUR), where she worked as an assistant to Vice Minister of Foreign Trade Alfredo Ferrero Diez Canseco. In 2003, she became an advisor to Minister Ferrero, serving in that position until 2005.

In 2006, Cornejo joined the Commission for the Promotion of Peru for Exports and Tourism (PromPerú) as an advisor to its Executive Directorate. She later served as Deputy Director of Domestic Tourism at PromPerú from 2009 to 2010 and as National Director of Tourism Development at MINCETUR from 2010 to 2011.

In August 2011, she was appointed Vice Minister of Tourism by President Ollanta Humala, serving until November 2013. During this period, she also served as president of the Board of Directors of the Centro de Formación en Turismo (CENFOTUR).

From 2014 to 2016, Cornejo worked as Consulting Director at Deloitte Peru, specializing in areas including strategy, operations, tourism, hospitality, and government. From 2016 to 2019, she served as General Manager of the National Confederation of Private Business Institutions (CONFIEP).

She is also associated with the Gustavo Mohme Llona Foundation.

== Political life ==
Cornejo participated in the 2020 Peruvian parliamentary election, running for a seat in the Congress of the Republic of Peru as a candidate of the Purple Party, although she was not elected.
