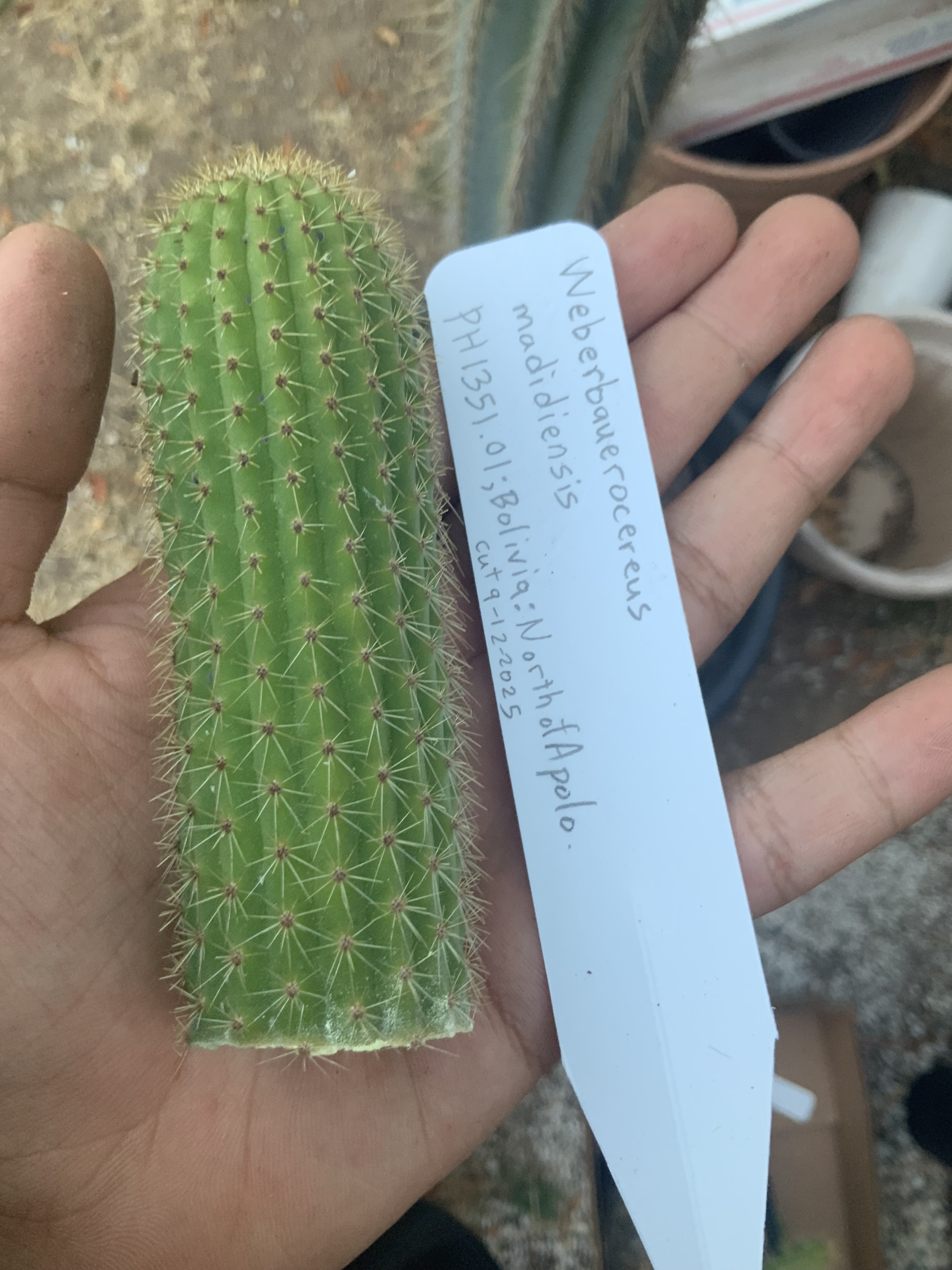

Conservation status
- Endangered (IUCN 2.3)

Scientific classification
- Kingdom: Plantae
- Clade: Tracheophytes
- Clade: Angiosperms
- Clade: Eudicots
- Order: Caryophyllales
- Family: Cactaceae
- Subfamily: Cactoideae
- Genus: Weberbauerocereus
- Species: W. madidiensis

Binomial name
- Weberbauerocereus madidiensis Quispe & A.Fuentes

= Weberbauerocereus madidiensis =

Species of plant

Weberbauerocereus madidiensis is a species of Weberbauerocereus from Bolivia.

== Description ==
Weberbauerocereus madidiensis grows as a shrub with more or less upright, cylindrical shoots 10–15(–33) cm in diameter, that branch out from the base and 5–7 meters tall. Areolas have (11)13 to 19 spines that are brown and yellowish spines in the apical part, slightly shiny, mature stems with thorns whitish below; ribs 16 to 24, 1–2.4 34.5–7.9 mm. Flowers located in the upper third already apex of stems, nocturnal, more or less radially symmetrical flowers stand horizontally from the shoot. They are up to 7.4–13.4 millimeters long with a 4.5–4.6 mm diameter. The strong flower tube is reddish and covered with dark hairs. The flower bracts are white at their base and pink at their tip. The spherical fruits are round, covered with scales and hairs, greenish-reddish to brown, white pulp with a diameter of 3 cm.

== Distribution ==
Plants are found in the La Paz Department in Bolivia, growing in successional forest between 730 and 1200 meters.
