= Permanent Delegate of Peru to UNESCO =

Permanent Representative of Peru to the United Nations Educational, Scientific and Cultural Organization
- Great Seal of Peru
- Ministry of Foreign Affairs
- Appointer: The president of Peru
- Inaugural holder: Ventura García Calderón
- Formation: 1949

The permanent delegate of Peru to the United Nations Educational, Scientific and Cultural Organization is Peru's foremost diplomatic representative at the United Nations Educational, Scientific and Cultural Organization, and in charge of Peru's diplomatic mission to UNESCO.

The first representative of Peru for UNESCO was Ventura García Calderón in 1949.

== List of representatives ==
Name	Portrait	Term begin	Term end	President
Ventura García Calderón		1949	1959	Manuel A. Odría
Roberto MacLean y Estenós		1960	1962	Manuel Prado Ugarteche
Enrique Peña Barrenechea		1963	1963	Nicolás Lindley López
César Miró		1963	1965	Fernando Belaúnde
Alberto Wagner de Reyna		1966	1968	Fernando Belaúnde
Jorge Guillermo Llosa Pautrat		1969	1971	Juan Velasco Alvarado
Mario Alzamora Valdéz		1971	1971	Juan Velasco Alvarado
Augusto Morelli Pando		1972	1973	Juan Velasco Alvarado
Guillermo Lohmann Villena		1974	1977	Juan Velasco Alvarado
Alberto Wagner de Reyna		1977	1978	Francisco Morales Bermúdez
Raúl María Pereira Veintemilla		1978	1981	Francisco Morales Bermúdez
Luis Felipe Alarco		1981	1984	Fernando Belaúnde
Javier Velarde Aspíllaga		1984	1985	Fernando Belaúnde
Julio Ramón Ribeyro		1986	1990	Alan García
Hugo Palma		1992	1995	Alberto Fujimori
María Luisa Federici		1996	2000	Alberto Fujimori
Javier Pérez de Cuéllar		2001	2004	Alejandro Toledo
Felipe Beraún Ugás		2005	2006	Alejandro Toledo
Harry Belevan-McBride		2007	2010	Alan García
Cecilia Bákula		2010	2012	Alan García
Manuel Rodríguez Cuadros		July 12, 2012	June 16, 2018	Ollanta Humala
Ricardo Luna Mendoza		June 16, 2018	November 9, 2020	Martín Vizcarra
Silvia Alfaro Espinosa		October 22, 2021	October 10, 2022	Pedro Castillo

== See also ==
- Peru and the United Nations
- Permanent Representative of Peru to the Organization of American States
- Permanent Representative of Peru to the United Nations
- List of ambassadors of Peru to the European Union
