= Guillermo Lohmann Villena =

Peruvian diplomat and historian (1915–2005)

Permanent Delegate of Peru to UNESCO
- In office 1974–1977

Personal details
- Born: October 7 1915 Lima, Peru
- Died: July 14 2005 Lima, Peru
- Occupation: Historian, diplomat, genealogist, lawyer, professor

Guillermo Lohmann Villena (1915–2005) was a Peruvian diplomat, historian, lawyer, and writer.

He is considered one of the most prolific Peruvian historians and the most important specialist in the viceregal era. He also served as Permanent Delegate of Peru to UNESCO from 1974 to 1977.

He attended the Deutsche Schule Alexander von Humboldt Lima (Colegio Peruano-Alemán Alexander von Humboldt).
