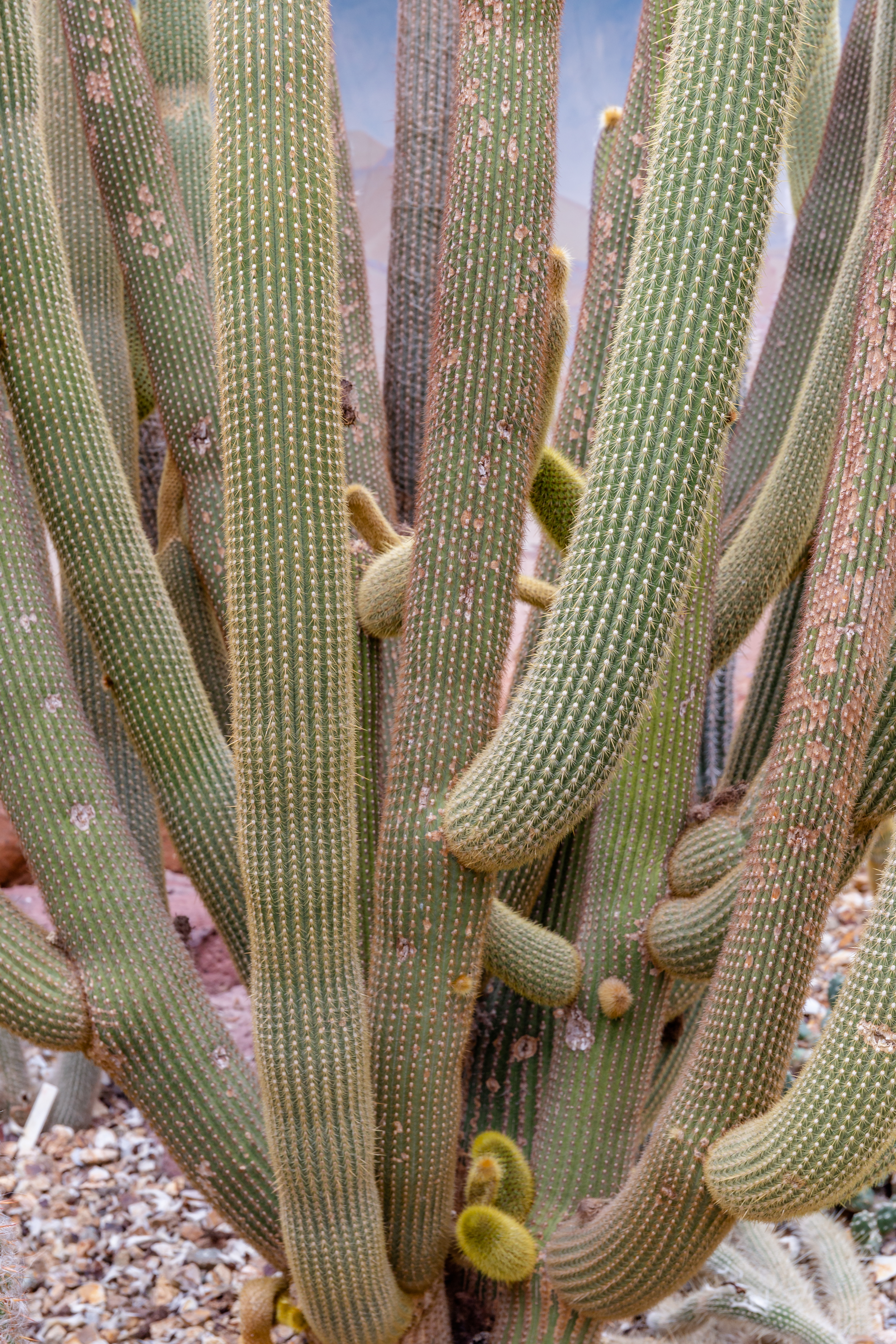

Conservation status
- Least Concern (IUCN 2.3)

Scientific classification
- Kingdom: Plantae
- Clade: Tracheophytes
- Clade: Angiosperms
- Clade: Eudicots
- Order: Caryophyllales
- Family: Cactaceae
- Subfamily: Cactoideae
- Genus: Weberbauerocereus
- Species: W. winterianus

Binomial name
- Weberbauerocereus winterianus F.Ritter

Synonyms
- Echinopsis winteriana (F.Ritter) Molinari & Mayta 2015; Haageocereus winterianus (F.Ritter) P.V.Heath 1995; Echinopsis johnsonii (F.Ritter) Molinari & Mayta 2015; Haageocereus johnsonii (F.Ritter) P.V.Heath 1995; Haageocereus winterianus var. australis (F.Ritter) P.V.Heath 1995; Weberbauerocereus johnsonii F.Ritter 1962; Weberbauerocereus winterianus var. australis F.Ritter 1962

= Weberbauerocereus winterianus =

Species of plant

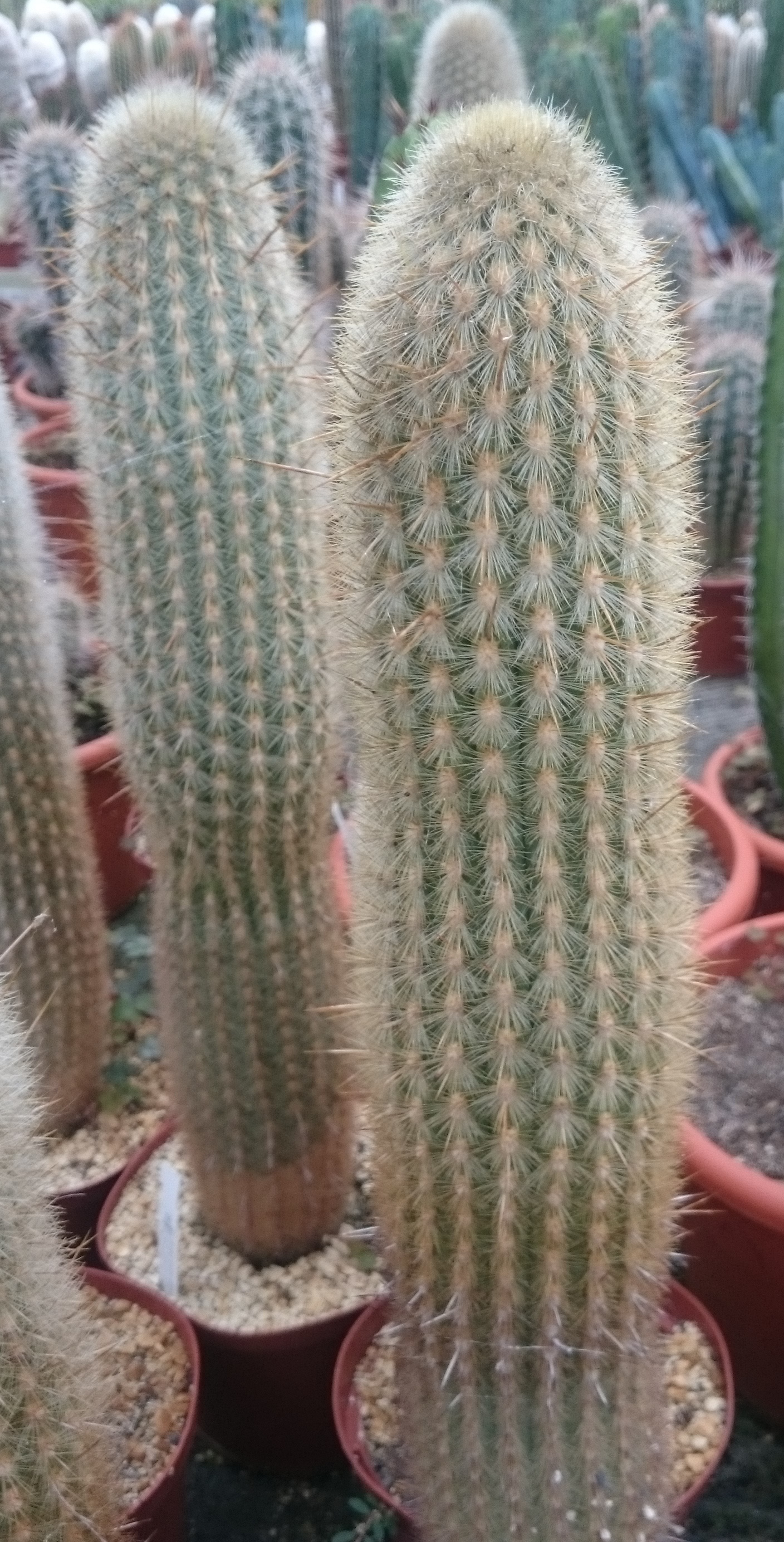
Weberbauerocereus johnsonii

Weberbauerocereus winterianus is a species of Weberbauerocereus from Peru.

== Description ==
Weberbauerocereus winterianus grows tree-shaped and reaches a height of 4 to 6 meters. The trunk branches grow approximately 2 meter long into parallel shoots with a diameter of 5 to 8 cm (2.0 to 3.1 in). The branches have 20 to 30 blunt ribs are up to 5 mm (0.20 in) high with dark areoles on it that are up to 4 mm (0.16 in) long. Areoles have dark, golden-yellow spines emerge from them. The 12 to 15 needle-shaped central spines are strong, growing up to 1.5 cm (0.59 in) long and the 20 to 30 fine marginal spines lie close to the shoots growing 5 to 15 mm (0.20 to 0.59 in) long. In the flowering area, the shoots are covered with fine, light yellow to golden yellow, bristle-like spines that are up to 7 cm (2.8 in) long.

The flowers open at night and are up to 7.5 cm (3.0 in) long. Its brown-red to green flower tube is covered with blackish-brown wool. The flower bracts are white or slightly pink. The barrel-shaped fruits are green to reddish and reach a diameter of up to 4 cm (1.6 in). They are covered with dense dark wool.

== Distribution ==
Weberbauerocereus winterianus is distributed in the Peruvian regions of Cajamarca and Ancash.

== Taxonomy ==
The first description was made in 1962 by Friedrich Ritter. The specific epithet winterianus honors the nursery owner Hildegard Winter (1893–1975), Friedrich Ritter's sister. Nomenclature synonym are Haageocereus winterianus (F.Ritter) P.V.Heath (1995) and Echinopsis winteriana (F.Ritter) Molinari & Mayta (2015).
