= Permanent Representative of Peru to the Organization of American States =

- Great Seal of Peru

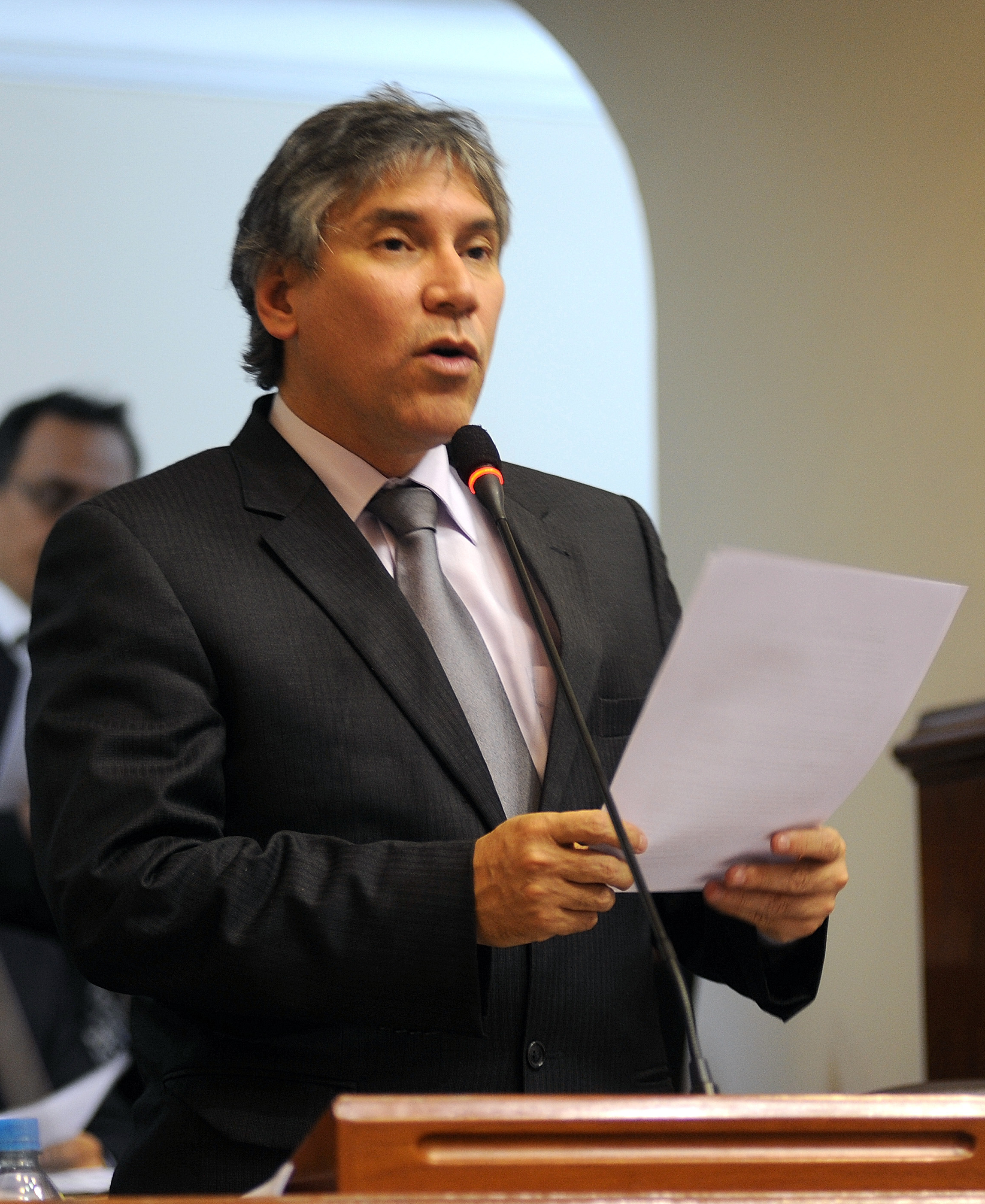
- Incumbent; Aurelio Pastor since September 8, 2026
- Ministry of Foreign Affairs
- Nominator: President
- Appointer: President
- Inaugural holder: Juan Bautista de Lavalle
- Formation: 1948
- Website: Representatives to the OAS

The permanent representative of Peru to the Organization of American States is the permanent representative of Peru to the Organization of American States.

Peru is a founding member of the OAS and has sent permanent representatives since the organization's inception in 1948.

== List of representatives ==
Order	Name	Portrait	Term begin	Term end	President	Notes
1	Juan Bautista de Lavalle y García		May 1948	February 1968	José Luis Bustamante y Rivero	Permanent representative. President of the Permanent Council (1963-1964)
2	Luis Alvarado Garrido		March 1968	March 1977	Fernando Belaúnde	Ambassador and permanent representative
3	Luis Marchand		April 1977	September 1984	Francisco Morales Bermúdez	Ambassador and permanent representative
4	Jorge Guillermo Llosa Pautrat		1985	1985	Fernando Belaúnde	Ambassador and permanent representative
5	Jorge Raygada Cauvi		November 1985	September 1986	Alan García	Ambassador and permanent representative
6	Luis Gonzales Posada		September 1986	March 1988	Alan García	Ambassador and permanent representative
7	Edmundo Haya de la Torre		March 1988	July 1990	Alan García	Ambassador and permanent representative
8	Luis Marchand		February 1991	November 1992	Alberto Fujimori	Ambassador and permanent representative
9	Alejandro León Pazos		December 1992	November 1994	Alberto Fujimori	Ambassador and permanent representative
10	Beatriz Ramacciotti Regazzoli de Cubas		November 1994	November 2000	Alberto Fujimori	Ambassador and permanent representative
11	Manuel Rodríguez Cuadros		January 2001	September 2001	Valentín Paniagua	Ambassador and permanent representative
12	Eduardo Ferrero Costa		October 2001	March 2004	Alejandro Toledo	Ambassador and permanent representative
13	Alberto Borea		March 2004	August 2005	Alejandro Toledo	Ambassador and permanent representative
14	Fernando de la Flor Arbulú		October 2005	August 2006	Alejandro Toledo	Ambassador and permanent representative
15	Ántero Flores Aráoz		January 2007	December 2007	Alan García	Ambassador and permanent representative
16	María Zavala Valladares		February 2008	March 2010	Alan García	Ambassador and permanent representative
17	Hugo de Zela		March 2010	October 2011	Alan García	Ambassador and permanent representative
18	Walter Albán		January 2012	November 2013	Ollanta Humala	Ambassador and permanent representative
19	Juan Jiménez Mayor		December 2013	January 2016	Ollanta Humala	Ambassador and permanent representative
20	Luis Juan Chuquihuaura Chil		February 2016	August 2016	Ollanta Humala	Ambassador and permanent representative
21	Ana Rosa Valdivieso Santa María		October 2016	2019	Pedro Pablo Kuczynski	Ambassador and permanent representative
22	José Manuel Boza		February 20, 2019	August 28, 2020	Martín Vizcarra	Ambassador and permanent representative
23	Vicente Zeballos		August 28, 2020	November 12, 2020	Martín Vizcarra	Ambassador and permanent representative
24	Hugo de Zela		November 13, 2020	August 3, 2021	Manuel Merino	Ambassador and permanent representative
25	Harold Forsyth		August 4, 2021	December 7, 2022	Pedro Castillo	Ambassador and permanent representative. He quit as a result of the 2022 Peruvian self-coup attempt.
26	Gustavo Adrianzén		February 23, 2023	March 5, 2024	Dina Boluarte	Ambassador and permanent representative

== See also ==
- List of ambassadors of Peru to the European Union
- Permanent Representative of Peru to the United Nations
- Permanent Delegate of Peru to UNESCO
