= Yehude Simon =

Peruvian politician (born 1947)

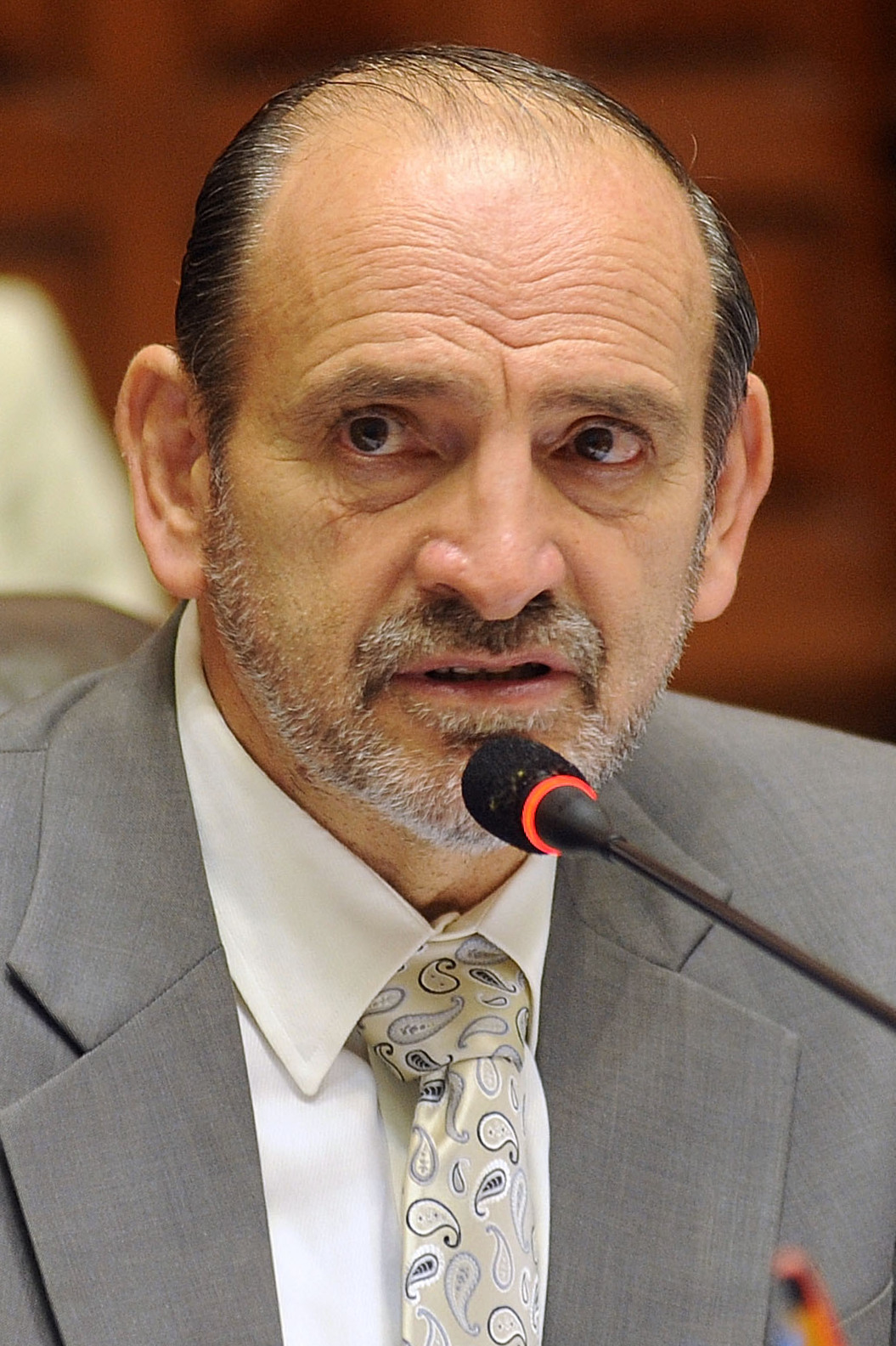
- Simon in 2012

Member of Congress
- In office 26 July 2011 – 26 July 2016
- Constituency: Lambayeque

Second Vice President of Congress
- In office 26 July 2011 – 26 July 2012
- President: Daniel Abugattás
- Preceded by: Alda Lazo
- Succeeded by: Juan Carlos Eguren

Prime Minister of Peru
- In office 14 October 2008 – 11 July 2009
- President: Alan García
- Preceded by: Jorge del Castillo
- Succeeded by: Javier Velásquez

1st Governor of Lambayeque
- In office 1 January 2003 – 14 October 2008
- Lieutenant: Nery Saldarriaga
- Preceded by: Office Created
- Succeeded by: Nery Saldarriaga

Member of the Chamber of Deputies
- In office 26 July 1985 – 26 July 1990
- Constituency: Lambayeque

Personal details
- Born: 18 July 1947 (age 79) Lima, Peru
- Party: First the People (2023); Together for Peru (2017–2021); Peruvian Humanist Party (2001–2017)
- Other political affiliations: Union for Peru (2002–2006); United Left (1983–1990)
- Spouse: Nancy Valcárcel
- Education: Pedro Ruiz Gallo State University (BA)

Yehude Simon Munaro (born 18 July 1947) is a Peruvian politician, who served as Governor of the Lambayeque Region between 2003 and 2008, Prime Minister between 2008 and 2009 and as a Congressman from Lambayeque between 2011 and 2016, elected under the Alliance for the Great Change. He ran for the presidency in 2016, then shortly announced his withdrawal.

== Early life and education ==
Born in Lima, Simon's family moved to the city of Chiclayo to establish a shoe retail business. After completing his early education at the Colegio Manuel Pardo, he joined the Faculty of Veterinary Medicine at the Universidad Nacional Pedro Ruiz Gallo, in the city of Lambayeque, where he later was a lecturer. He married Nancy Valcárcel, a Chiclayo painter with whom he had four children: Jessica, Yehude, Yusef and Yail, also he had ten grandchildren: David, Micaela, Joaquín, Nicole, Salvador, Belén, Rafaella, Santiago, Isabella and Julián.

== Political career ==
=== Early political career ===
Yehude Simon began his political career in 1983, when he ran for the post of Mayor of Chiclayo under the United Left, and was placed second. In the 1985 general elections, he ran in the Chamber of Deputies under the United Left, and was elected Deputy for the Lambayeque region for the 1985–1990 term, integrating the Committees on Justice and Human Rights Congress.

In 1991, he founded the Free Patriotic Movement, who was accused of being the legal wing of the MRTA (Túpac Amaru Revolutionary Movement) rebel movement, famous for the 1996-97 Japanese embassy hostage crisis in Lima. On 5 April 1992, Simon was in Europe, participating in conferences. Upon learning of the breakdown of the constitutional President Alberto Fujimori he returned to Peru and decided to participate in the protest against the closure of the Congress of Peru.

=== Arrest and imprisonment ===
On 11 June 1992, he was arrested along with other leaders of Patria Libre, and accused of subversion. Later that year he was sentenced by the judiciary to 20 years of imprisonment for the crime of "glorification of terrorism." During his eight and a half years in prison, human rights organizations, Amnesty International, some media and some opposition Peruvian politicians demanded that the Fujimori regime to pardon him. In November 2000, during the Transitional Government headed by President Valentín Paniagua Corazao, Simon was pardoned and released by the then Minister of Justice, Diego García Sayán. He was held for 8 years and six months.

=== Post-imprisonment: Governor of Lambayeque ===
In the 2002 regional elections, Yehude Simon ran for president of the Lambayeque Regional Government and electorally defeated the Peruvian Aprista Party candidate Luis Falla, which is considered one of the most popular political parties in northern Peru. In his first four years of his regional presidency, the government carried out works focused mainly on the rural sector, among which the most notorious is the tender for the construction of the Olmos Project.

In December 2005, the Decentralist Concertation Alliance was signed between the Peruvian Humanist Movement, the Party for Social Democracy - Peru Commitment, Ayllu Self-Government and other regionalist organizations. The presidential formula was headed by Susana Villarán and she participated unsuccessfully in the presidential elections.

In the regional elections of 2006, which were held on the third Sunday of the month of November of that year; Yehude Simon ran and won the elections again, defeating the Peruvian Aprista Party (for the second time) and the Independent Solidarity Friendship Movement.

Since July 2008 he has been the president of the moderate center-left Peruvian Humanist Party.

=== Prime Minister of Peru ===
On 14 October 2008, Simon was sworn in as President of the Council of Ministers, a position akin to that of a Prime Minister, replacing Jorge del Castillo who resigned in aftermath of the Petroaudios scandal. President Alan García had appointed Simon, who is politically to the left of García, in an effort to mollify the country's poor and nationalists who are considered "hard-line leftists" by the right-wing Peruvian parties.

==== Resignation ====
In June 2009, Simon announced that he would resign as prime minister "in the coming weeks", following violence over the land rights of Amazon Indians. He resigned on 10 July 2009 and was replaced on 11 July 2009 by Javier Velásquez.

Simon went on to apologize to the indigenous people, acknowledging the government had not properly consulted with the Amazon Indians prior to passing ten controversial laws, designed to ease foreign companies in the exploration of the Amazon for oil, gas and lumber. Simon pledged to work to persuade the Peruvian congress to repeal these controversial laws. Peru's indigenous leaders had launched protest strikes and blockades in April 2009; resulting in 34 persons killed, including 23 policemen; in bloody clashes between the Amazon Indians and the Peruvian police.

=== Congressman (2011–2016) ===
In the 2011 general election Simon was elected Congressman for Lambayeque on the list of the Alliance for the Great Change to which his Humanist Party has integrated. He was Second Vice President of Congress for the annual 2011–2012 term. On 17 January 2012, using his congressional vote, he tipped the balance against the lawlessness of Congressman and former Vice President Omar Chehade accused of criminal offenses, This earned him wide criticism from the press and from the majority of the population. Days later, on 31 January, he regretted his vote in favor of avoiding Chehade's lawlessness, not for protecting alleged criminal offenses, but for not respecting the agreement of the Alliance for the Great Change on this issue.

== Arrest ==
On 24 January 2020, Simón was preliminarily detained for 10 days for having accepted bribes from Odebrecht in the Olmos Project. He was sentenced to house arrest for 36 months.

Political offices
Preceded by Jorge del Castillo	Prime Minister of Peru; 2008–2009	Succeeded by Javier Velásquez
