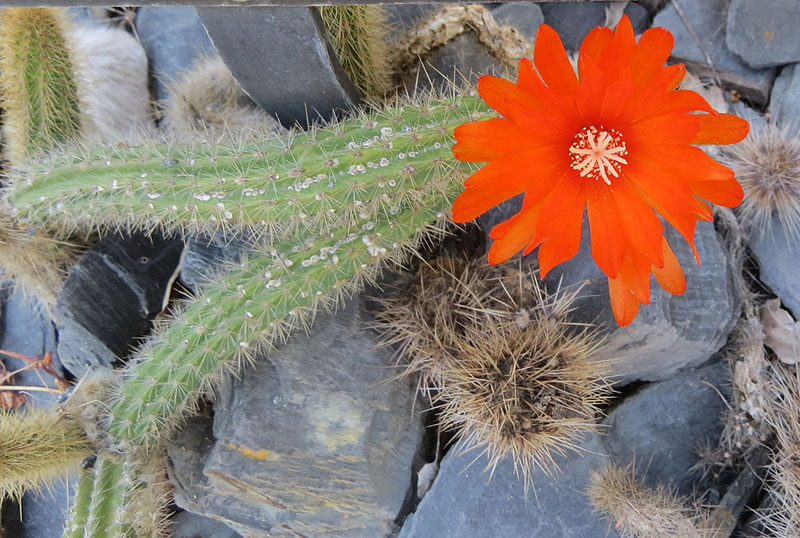

Conservation status
- Least Concern (IUCN 2.3)

Scientific classification
- Kingdom: Plantae
- Clade: Tracheophytes
- Clade: Angiosperms
- Clade: Eudicots
- Order: Caryophyllales
- Family: Cactaceae
- Subfamily: Cactoideae
- Genus: Weberbauerocereus
- Species: W. rauhii

Binomial name
- Weberbauerocereus rauhii Backeb. 1956

Synonyms
- Echinopsis rauhii (Backeb.) Mayta 2015; Haageocereus rauhii (Backeb.) P.V.Heath 1995; Haageocereus rauhii var. laticornua (Rauh) P.V.Heath 1995; Weberbauerocereus rauhii var. laticornua Rauh 1958

= Weberbauerocereus rauhii =

Species of plant

Weberbauerocereus rauhii is a species of Weberbauerocereus from Peru.

== Description ==
Weberbauerocereus rauhii grows shrubby to tree-shaped with candelabra-like, upright shoots that have a diameter of 8 to 15 cm (3.1 to 5.9 in) and reaches heights of up to 6 meters. A short trunk is formed. Stems have about 23 ribs with gray areoles that contain up to six, very strong, yellow central spines with darker tip that are 6 to 7 cm (2.4 to 2.8 in) long and numerous whitish-gray radial spines are up to 1 cm (0.39 in) long. Long bristles are present in the flowering area.

The somewhat zygomorphic, slightly violet-brown fragrant flowers open at night and are up to 10 cm (3.9 in) long. The flower tube is densely scaled with the outer bracts are reddish brown, the inner ones are white to pink or pinkish-brown. The fruits are brownish red to orange and reach a diameter of up to 3 cm (1.2 in). They are trimmed with white wool.

== Distribution ==
Weberbauerocereus rauhii is found in the Peruvian regions of Huancavelica, Ayacucho, Arequipa and Ica at altitudes of 500 to 2500 meters.

The first description by Curt Backeberg was published in 1957. The specific epithet rauhii honors the German botanist Werner Rauh. Nomenclature synonyms are Haageocereus rauhii (Backeb.) P.V.Heath (1995) and Echinopsis rauhii (Backeb.) Mayta (2015).
