= Manuel Rodríguez Cuadros =

Peruvian diplomat (born 1949)

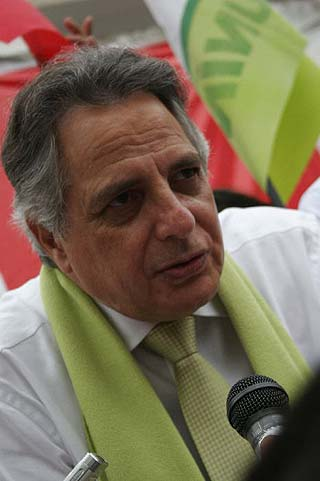
- Manuel Rodríguez Cuadros in 2010

Minister of Foreign Relations
- In office 15 December 2003 – 11 August 2005
- President: Alejandro Toledo
- Prime Minister: Carlos Ferrero
- Preceded by: Allan Wagner Tizón
- Succeeded by: Fernando Olivera

Personal details
- Born: José Manuel Rodríguez Cuadros; 17 March 1949 (age 77) Cuzco, Peru
- Party: Fuerza Social
- Profession: Diplomat

José Manuel Rodríguez Cuadros is a Peruvian diplomat. He served as Minister of Foreign Affairs of Peru from 2003 to 2005, during Alejandro Toledo's presidency, and later was appointed ambassador to Bolivia in 2010.

== Biography ==
Son of Elva Maria Cuadros Escobedo and the educator José Gabriel Rodríguez Figueroa. He completed his primary studies at the Salesiano College of Cusco, and his secondary studies were carried out at the Great Ricardo Palma School Unit in Lima.

He entered the Universidad Nacional Mayor de San Marcos, where he studied Law and Political Science; after that he studied at the Diplomatic Academy of Peru.

He has a master's degree in International Law and International Relations at the University of Paris V René Descartes, as well as a doctorate in International Law with a major in International Development Law at the same university.

In 1974, when the Peruvian press was expropriated by the dictatorial government of Juan Velasco Alvarado, he was an editorial writer for the newspaper Correo de Lima and a political commentator for channel 5 of Peruvian television.

In 2001, he served as Permanent Representative of Peru to the Organization of American States.

Between 1992 and 1993, he served as senior advisor to the Human Rights Division of the United Nations Peacekeeping Mission in El Salvador.

At the end of December 1992, he was dismissed from the Peruvian diplomatic service by the government of Alberto Fujimori.

In 1993 he was appointed "Senior Political Officer" in the United Nations Department of Political Affairs.

In Geneva, in April 2000, he was elected by the United Nations Human Rights Commission, for a period of four years, a member of the Sub-Commission of the aforementioned organism for the Promotion and Protection of Human Rights.

In 2005 he assumed the presidency of the UN Conference on Disarmament based in Geneva, and in 2006 he was President of the United Nations Commission on Human Rights.

He is an Associate member of the "Peruvian Center for International Relations", of the "Peruvian International Relations Forum", of the "French Institute of International Relations", of the "Swiss International Relations Forum", of the "Latin American Association of Public International Law" and of the "Peruvian Society of International Law".

Since the beginning of 2009, he is president of the "Latin American Institute of International Law and International Relations - ILADIR".

== Diplomatic career ==
Cuadros was the Minister of Foreign Affairs of Peru from 2003 and 2005, and was named ambassador of Peru in Bolivia in 2010. He has also served as a diplomat in United States, Switzerland, France, Uruguay, Ecuador and UNESCO.

== 2011 presidential campaign ==
He was the candidate of Fuerza Social for the Presidency of Peru in the Peruvian general election of 2011. He quit the presidential race on March 18, 2011.

== See also ==
- 2011 Peruvian general election
- Alejandro Toledo
- Susana Villarán
