= Peru and the United Nations =

Republic of Peru

United Nations membership
- Membership: Full member
- Since: 31 October 1945
- UNSC seat: Non-permanent
- Ambassador: Enrique Román Morey

The Republic of Peru became a member of the United Nations (UN) on October 31, 1945, being a founding member of the organisation. The 5th Secretary-General of the United Nations was Javier Pérez de Cuéllar, a Peruvian diplomat. He held the position from 1982 to 1991.

Peru is a regular participant in peacekeeping missions of the UN, as well as anti-drug trafficking and climate change operations.

== History ==
Peru was a founding member of the League of Nations, starting on January 10, 1920. In 1932, a civilian takeover of the city of Leticia soon became an undeclared war between Peru and Colombia as the Peruvian Army moved to oppose a Colombian re-occupation. After months of diplomatic negotiations, the governments accepted mediation by the League of Nations, and their representatives presented their cases before the council. A provisional peace agreement, signed by both parties in May 1933, provided for the League to assume control of the disputed territory while bilateral negotiations proceeded. In May 1934, a final peace agreement was signed, resulting in the return of Leticia to Colombia, a formal apology from Peru for the 1932 invasion, demilitarisation of the area around Leticia, free navigation on the Amazon and Putumayo Rivers, and a pledge of non-aggression.

During World War II, Peru joined the Allied forces in 1945 and joined the UN as a founding member in the same year.

Peru has been a non-permanent member of the United Nations Security Council from 1955 to 1956, 1973 to 1974, 1984 to 1985, 2006 to 2007, and, most recently, from 2018 to 2019.

=== Peacekeeping ===
Peru, as a founding member of the UN, has had a high level of participation in peacekeeping missions, collaborating with troops commonly known as the "Blue Helmets". In 1988, during the management of the Peruvian Javier Pérez de Cuéllar as Secretary General of the UN, the United Nations peacekeepers received the Nobel Peace Prize.

Peru has sent troops from the Army, the Navy, and the Air Force. The missions in which the country has participated (and, as of 2023, continues to participate) are:

- Lebanon (June–December 1958)
- Egypt (October 1973–July 1979)
- Syria (June 1974 – 1977)
- Iran–Irak (August 1988–February 1991)
- Namibia (April 1989–March 1990)
- Ecuador–Peru (1995–2000)
- Sierra Leone (1999–2001)
- East Timor (2000–2001)
- Ethiopia–Eritrea (July 2000 – 2008)
- Burundi (June 2004 – 2005)
- Cyprus (2002–2004; 2008–2010)
- Liberia (April 2004 – 2011)
- Darfur (July 2007 – 2020)
- Côte d'Ivoire (April 2004 – 2013)
- Haiti (1 June 2004 – 2016)
- Democratic Republic of the Congo (July 2010–present)
- Abyei (June 2011–present)
- South Sudan (July 2011–present)
- Western Sahara (1991; 2012–present)
- Lebanon (2014–present)
- Central African Republic (15 December 2015–present)

== Representation ==
Peru maintains a permanent representation to the Headquarters of the United Nations in New York City, as well as in Geneva, Paris (to UNESCO), Vienna and Rome through its respective embassies.

The United Nations maintains a Resident Coordinator Office in Peru, based in Miraflores District, Lima. The current Resident Coordinator is Rossana Dudziak, appointed on October 4, 2024. The United Nations Development Programme, based in the same location, also has its own Resident Representative. As of 2025, the incumbent is Bettina Woll de Montenach.

Name	Country	Appointed	Secretary-General	Notes
Jakob Simonsen	Denmark	? (fl. 1995)	Boutros Boutros-Ghali	
María del Carmen Sacasa	Nicaragua	2015	Ban Ki-moon	Assumed duties on August 3.
Igor Garafulic	Chile	July 29, 2019	António Guterres	
Rossana Dudziak	Germany	October 4, 2024	António Guterres	

== See also ==
- Foreign relations of Peru
- Member states of the United Nations
