= Deutsche Schule Lima Alexander von Humboldt =

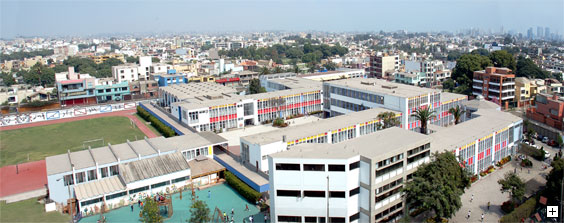
- Deutsche Schule Lima Alexander von Humboldt (2009)
- Lima; Peru

Information
- Type: German international school
- Established: March 1910
- Grades: Kindergarten through Abitur

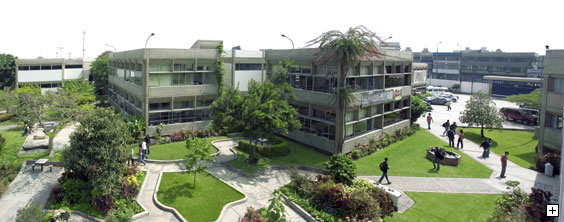
Deutsche Schule Lima Alexander von Humboldt

Deutsche Schule Alexander von Humboldt Lima (Spanish: Colegio Peruano Alemán Alexander von Humboldt) is a private German international school with two campuses in Lima, Peru: one in Miraflores and one in Surco, with a recreational centre in Huampaní. The school serves levels from Kindergarten through Abitur and the Peruvian bachillerato.

It was established in March 1910 after decades of organization. Its first director was Erich Zurkalowski. The school was closed from 1942 to 1952 due to World War II and reopened under its current name.

== History ==
On April 1, 1872, the school opened its doors with the name of Instituto de Lima. The following year the first stone of the premises was laid in Alameda Grau in the presence of President Manuel Pardo y Lavalle, whose government would provide the necessary support for the school. It was in those years that German and Latin began to be taught, bringing in teachers from the Royal Gymnasium in Cologne.

During the War of the Pacific, the institute's activities were affected as the new premises had not even been opened. By 1889 the school opened, and although the school was directed by a German director, this language was losing prominence in the institution.

=== Deutsche Schule ===
In 1910, the intention to create an authentic Deutsche Schule in Lima came from the initiative of some members of the German community in Peru. The first location was located on Calle del Mascarón, in Cuzco Street, until 1915, then moving to Botica San Pedro Street, until 1923. The first director of this school would be the Lutheran Erich Zurkalowski.

At first, only students of German origin were accepted, but as of 1911 Peruvian students began to be admitted, although most of the classes were taught in German, with teachers such as the renowned Raúl Porras Barrenechea, Luis Alberto Sánchez, Augusto Weberbauer and Jorge Guillermo Leguía, as well as former German soldiers of the Great War. By 1922 the school had to face the problem of not being able to teach in German, since only English and French were allowed to be taught as foreign languages, although after protests German was once again taught in the school.

The college sought the same position as a German Realschule, taking the first official German exam in 1935. The following year the secondary school that followed the Peruvian curriculum was dissolved, adopting the model of a German secondary school, and, by 1938, Germany recognized the school as a higher level school.

World War II forced the school to close its doors in 1942, and it later reopened on the 1st of April, 1952 under its current name.

== Notable alumni ==
- Martín Adán - writer
- Fernando Belaúnde Terry - President of Peru
- Jorge Basadre - historian
- Guillermo Lohmann Villena - historian
- Estuardo Núñez Hague- writer
- Emilio Adolfo Westphalen - writer
- Juliane Koepcke - mammalogist

== Notable faculty ==
- Luis Alberto Sanchez - Peruvian writer
- Augusto Weberbauer - German scholar

== See also ==
- German Peruvian
