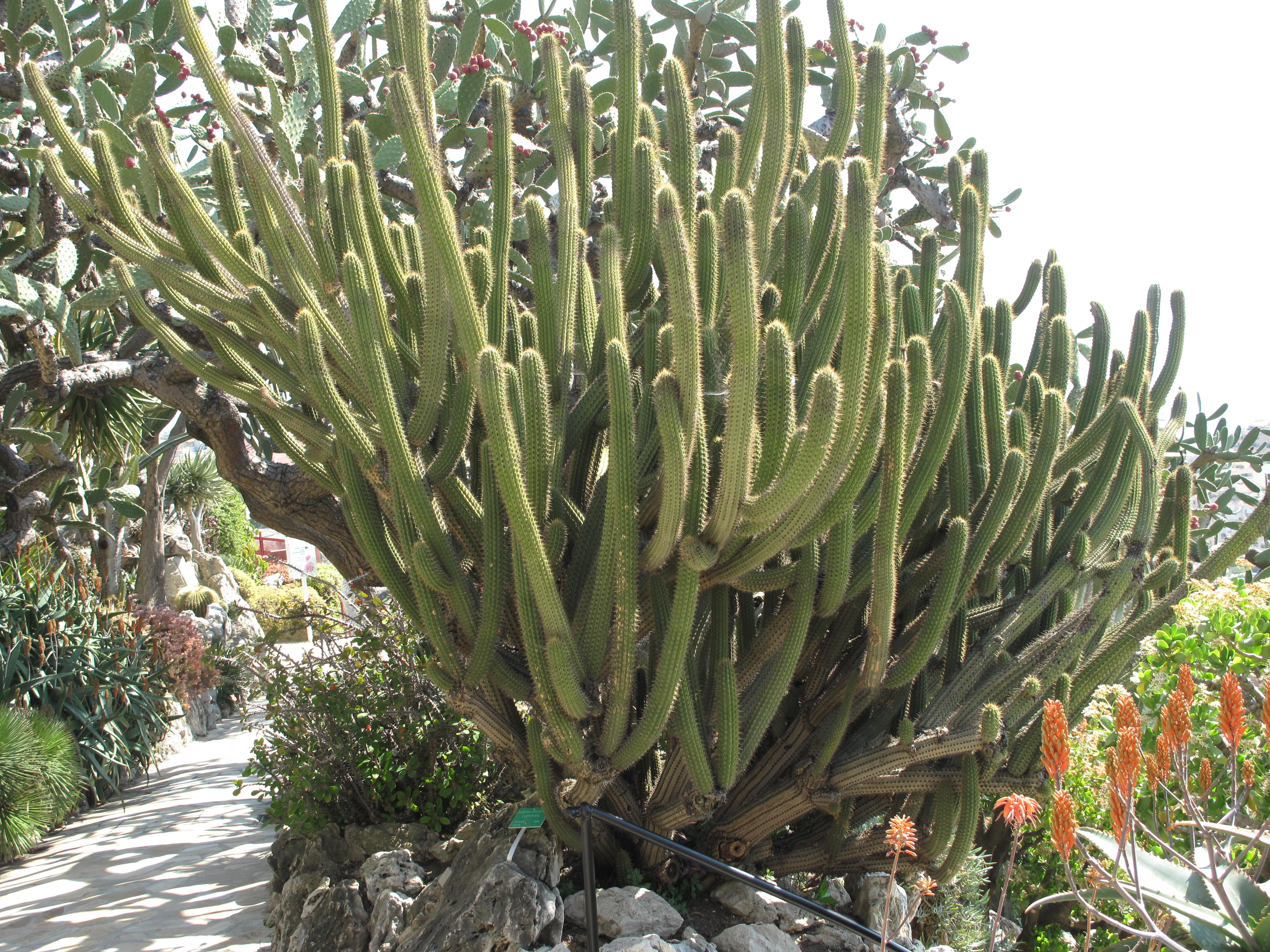

Conservation status
- Least Concern (IUCN 2.3)

Scientific classification
- Kingdom: Plantae
- Clade: Tracheophytes
- Clade: Angiosperms
- Clade: Eudicots
- Order: Caryophyllales
- Family: Cactaceae
- Subfamily: Cactoideae
- Genus: Weberbauerocereus
- Species: W. cuzcoensis

Binomial name
- Weberbauerocereus cuzcoensis Kníže 1968

Synonyms
- Echinopsis hennigiana Anceschi & Magli 2021; Haageocereus cuzcoensis (Kníže) P.V.Heath 1995; Haageocereus cuzcoensis var. tenuarboreus (F.Ritter) P.V.Heath 1995; Weberbauerocereus cuzcoensis var. tenuiarboreus F.Ritter 1981

= Weberbauerocereus cuzcoensis =

Species of plant

Weberbauerocereus cuzcoensis is a species of Weberbauerocereus from Peru.

== Description ==
Weberbauerocereus cuzcoensis grows like a tree with richly branched, sprawling, grey-green shoots with a diameter of 4 to 7 cm (1.6 to 2.8 in) and reaches heights of 3 to 4 meters with 10 to 14 ribs that are 6 to 11 mm (0.24 to 0.43 in) high and extremely blunt. The areoles on the stem are oval to circular and covered with white wool and strong, yellow to brownish spines. There are three to eight, hardly stinging central spines are 1 to 4 cm (0.39 to 1.57 in) and 10 to 14 radial spines 3 to 10 mm (0.12 to 0.39 in) long. The lowest radial spines are the longest.

The somewhat radially symmetrical, unpleasantly scented flowers open at night. They are 10 to 12 cm (3.9 to 4.7 in) long. Its light green flower tube is covered with brownish hairs. The bracts are white at their base and turn pale pink towards the tip. The fruits are dark green, 4 cm (1.6 in) long and reach a diameter of 3 cm (1.2 in).

== Distribution ==
Weberbauerocereus cuzcoensis is distributed in the Peruvian regions of Apurímac and Ayacucho at altitudes of 1500 to 2100 meters.

== Taxonomy ==
The first description was in 1969 by Karel Kníže. The specific epithet cuzcoensis refers to the occurrence of the species near Cuzco. A nomenclature synonym is Haageocereus cuzcoensis (Kníže) P.V.Heath (1995).
