= Oswaldo de Rivero =

Peruvian diplomat

- Born: 2 August 1936 (age 89)
- Occupation: Diplomat
- Years active: 1974–present

Oswaldo de Rivero (born 2 August 1936) is a Peruvian diplomat serving as the Ambassador to the United States. He served as Permanent Representative of Peru to the United Nations in New York City, and had previously held the post as Peru's ambassador to the World Trade Organization. Previously in his career, he held posts in London and Moscow, and Geneva. He studied law at the Universidad Católica in Lima and later earned a master's degree in international relations from Peru's Academia Diplomática. He carried out Postgraduate studies at the Graduate Institute of International Studies, Geneva. He has authored books on international development, which have been translated into several languages.

He criticizes both Marxism and the proposed liberal development of LDCs.

He is the author of The Myth of Development: The Non-viable Economics of the 21st Century.

== Family ==
He is married to Vivian Pliner de Rivero and has three daughters, Juliett Sophia, Katherina Blanca, and Blanca Maria de Rivero.

== Career ==
- 1974 to 1978: Secretary-General to the President of the Republic.
- 1986 to 1993: Head of the Peruvian delegation to the Uruguay Round negotiations.
- 1986: President of the Economic Commission at the Summit of Non-Aligned Countries (Harare).
- 1989 to 1992: Head of the Peruvian delegation to the United Nations Commission on Human Rights.
- 1990: President of the fourth Non-Proliferation Treaty Review Conference (Geneva).
- 1991: President of the Group of 77 developing countries (Geneva).
- xxxx to xxxx: Ambassador to the World Trade Organization.
- 2001 to 2006: Permanent Representative to the United Nations in New York.
- 2021 to 2023: Ambassador to the United States.

== Publications ==
- New Economic Order and International Development Law. 1980, Oxford: Pergamon Press, ISBN 9780080247069
- The Myth of Development: The Non-Viable Economies of the 21st Century. 2001, Zed Books, ISBN 978-1-85649-949-1. Second Edition: 2010, Zed Books, ISBN 978-1-84813-584-0. (also in French, Portuguese, Arabic, Japanese, Spanish and Turkish)
- Los Estados Inviables: No-Desarrollo y Supervivencia En El Siglo XXI. 2010, Catarata, ISBN 8483191660
- El pensamiento cero
- La isla de Príapo (Spanish). 2013, Atmosfera Literaria, ISBN 978-84-940759-0-2
