= Decentralist Social Force Party =

Political party in Peru

Decentralist Social Force Party Partido Descentralista Fuerza Social
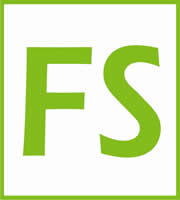
- Abbreviation: DFS/FS
- Leader: Carmela Chung Echevarría
- Founded: 1997 (as the Party for Social Democracy)
- Dissolved: August 2019
- Merged into: Citizen Force
- Ideology: Social democracy Democratic socialism Decentralisation
- Political position: Centre-left to left-wing
- National affiliation: Together for Peru (2017-2019)

Website
- http://www.fuerzasocial.pe/

The Decentralist Social Force Party (Spanish: Partido Descentralista Fuerza Social) also known as Social Force (Spanish: Fuerza Social) was a centre-left, social democratic, Peruvian political party. Founded in 1997 as the Party for Social Democracy (Spanish: Partido por la Democracia Social), it changed to its current name in 2007 after incorporating members of the CONREDES de Junín Movement and the Cajamarca Social Force movement.

== History ==
In 1999, in an assembly in Carabayllo, the Party for Social Democracy - Commitment for Peru was officially founded, being its first national coordinator Francisco Guerra-García. In 2000, in another assembly, Susana Villarán was elected as the national coordinator.

It was previously a member of the Concertación Descentralista, together with the Partido Movimiento Humanista Peruano (PMHP). The alliance was formally announced on 10 December 2005, two days after both parties obtained formal recognition by the Jurado Nacional de Elecciones, the election process authority. The alliance was ended the next year.

The Party Decentralist Social Force participated in the October 2010 elections in various departments and provinces of Peru, in many cases in alliances with regional movements.

In Lima, they formed a coalition with the "Movimiento Tierra y Libertad", the "Movimiento Nueva Izquierda" and the political movement "Lima Para Todos" to launch the candidacy of Susana Villarán, who obtained first place, becoming the first female elected mayor of Lima.

On December 10, 2010, Fuerza Social registered with the National Elections Jury as the Social Force Alliance to participate in the 2011 elections together with the New Left Movement and the Fonavistas of Peru. The next day, the party's legal representative re-registered the alliance but now only with the New Left Movement, excluding the Fonavista Party due to the link of one of its main leaders with the Comunicore case.

On December 18, 2010, in a party assembly, they decided the alliance with the New Left Movement, and launched the candidacy of Manuel Rodríguez Cuadros for the Presidency of the Republic in the 2011 elections, while the vice-presidential candidates They are Vladimiro Huaroc and Elva Quiñones.

On March 18, 2011, Manuel Rodríguez Cuadros and his presidential ticket resigned their candidacies, however the party's list to the Congress of the Republic and the Andean Parliament was maintained, although they did not manage to overcome the electoral threshold of 5% of the votes, the party losing its registration.

=== Last years ===
The party joined the Together for Peru coalition in May 2017, but ended up leaving in August 2019 in order to merge with Citizens for Change, a movement led by former Prime Minister Salomon Lerner Ghitis. The merger gave birth to Citizen Force, though Citizen Force was part of the Together for Peru coalition.

== Electoral history ==
=== Presidential elections ===
Year	Candidate	Party / Coalition	Votes	Percentage	Outcome
2006	Susana Villarán	Decentralization Coalition PDS-PHP	76 106	0.62	7th
2011	Manuel Rodríguez Cuadros	Decentralist Social Force Party	Ticket withdrawn	N/A	N/A

=== Election to the Congress of the Republic ===
Year	Votes	%	Number of seats	▲/▼	Position
2006	91 784	0.9%	0 / 120	Steady	N/A
2011	108 200	0.8%	0 / 130	Steady	N/A

== See also ==
- Category:Decentralist Social Force Party politicians
