= Democratic Force (Peru) =

Political party in Peru

Democratic Force Fuerza Democrática
- Leader: Alberto Borea
- Founded: 11 August 2004
- Dissolved: 27 August 2007

The Democratic Force (Spanish: Fuerza Democrática) is a Peruvian political party. At the legislative elections held on 9 April 2006, the party won 1.4% of the popular vote but no seats in the Congress of the Republic.
