= Decentralization Coalition =

Decentralization Coalition Concertación Descentralista
- Abbreviation: CD
- Leader: Susana Villarán de la Puente
- Founded: 10 December 2005
- Dissolved: 2 August 2006
- Headquarters: Lima
- Ideology: Social democracy Humanism; Decentralisation
- Political position: Centre-left

Website
- http://www.concertaciondescentralista.com

Concertación Descentralista was a Peruvian electoral coalition established to contend in the 2006 national election. It comprises two national-level parties: the Partido por la Democracia Social - Compromiso Perú (PDS) and the Partido Movimiento Humanista Peruano (PMHP). It was formally announced on 10 December 2005, barely two days after both parties obtained formal recognition by the Jurado Nacional de Elecciones, the election process authority.

The PMHP won the regional elections of 2002 for the northern region of Lambayeque. The PDS made its electoral debut from within the coalition. The coalition candidate for the presidency was Susana Villarán.

The political discourse revolved around decentralization, both political and economic, poverty reduction and state reform.

The first polls where the coalition appeared gave it 3%, in sixth position overall. Surprisingly, the candidate scored only 0.6% and came in seventh place.

The Concertación Descentralista was a supporter of the free software movement.

At the legislative elections held on 9 April 2006, the alliance won 0.9% of the popular vote but no seats in the Congress of the Republic. The coalition was dissolved along other parties and other coalitions that failed to pass the electoral threshold

== Electoral history ==
=== Presidential elections ===
Year	Candidate	Coalition	Votes	Percentage	Outcome
2006	Susana Villarán	Decentralization Coalition PDS-PHP	76 106	0.62	7th

=== Election to the Congress of the Republic ===
Year	Votes	%	Number of seats	▲/▼	Position
2006	91 784	0.9%	0 / 120	Steady	N/A
