= Susana Villarán =

Peruvian politician (born 1949)

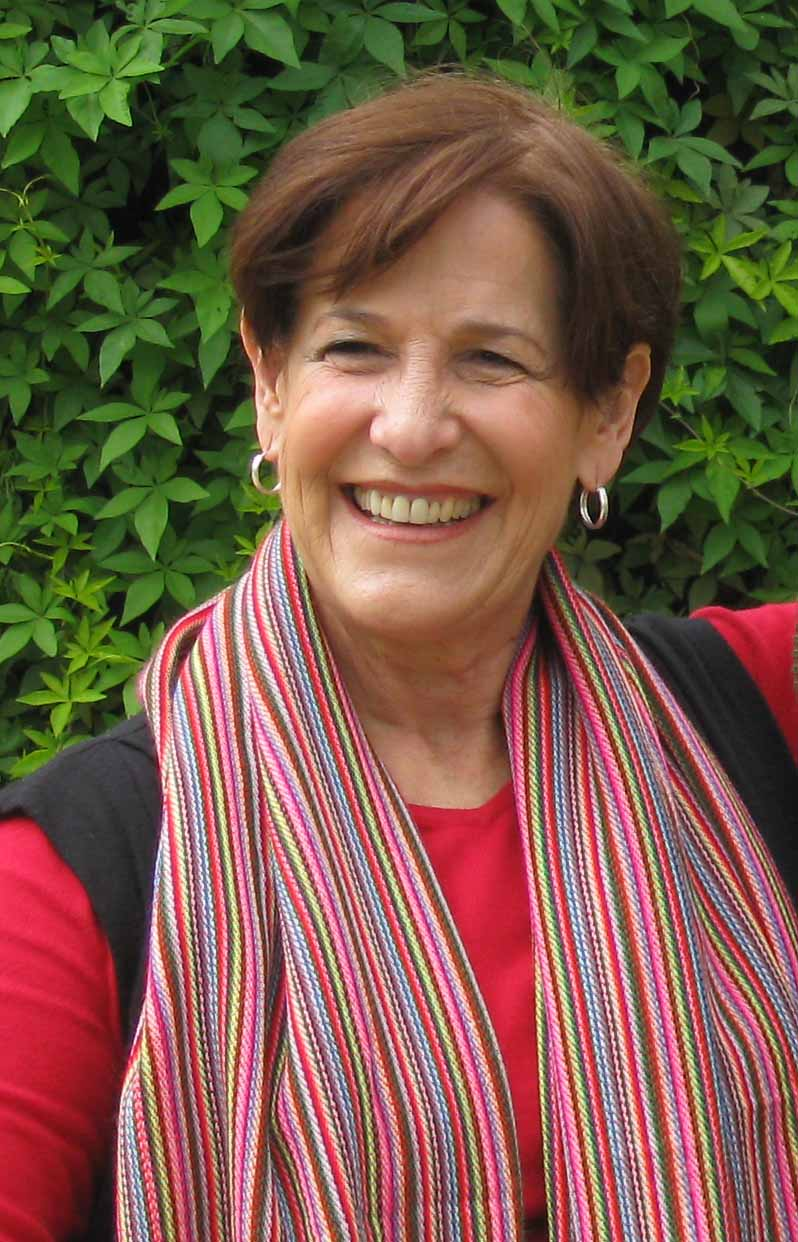
- Villarán in 2010

Mayor of Lima
- In office January 1, 2011 – December 31, 2014
- Preceded by: Marco Parra Sánchez (interim)
- Succeeded by: Luis Castañeda Lossio

Minister of the Promotion of Women and of Human Development
- In office November 22, 2000 – July 28, 2001
- President: Valentín Paniagua
- Preceded by: Luisa María Cuculiza
- Succeeded by: Doris Sánchez

Personal details
- Born: 16 August 1949 (age 76) Lima, Peru
- Party: Fuerza Social
- Spouse(s): Manuel Piqueras Luna (separated)
- Children: Emmanuel, Soledad and Ignacio
- Profession: Journalist
- Website: Susana Villarán

Susana María del Carmen Villarán de la Puente is a left politician in Peru, a former presidential candidate, and in municipal elections in 2010 became the first woman to be elected Mayor of Lima.

She was vice president of the Decentralist Social Force Party and formerly worked as a journalist and a secondary school teacher.

== Personal life ==
Born in Lima on 16 August 1949, she was the first daughter and the second of the seven children of Fernando Villarán Duany and Josefina de la Puente y Lavalle. Villarán studied at L'École Nouvelle of Miraflores and Colegio Sagrados Corazones Chalet of Chorrillos.

== Political life ==
She was a member of Lima's Metropolitan Municipality from 1983 to 1985, and co-founded with former mayor Alfonso Barrantes Lingán the Vaso de leche (glass of milk) program promoting child nutrition.

In 1995 Villarán was elected national co-ordinator of the Party for Social Democracy (Partido por la Democracia Social - Compromiso Perú, PDS). She became Minister for Women and Social Development during Valentín Paniagua's transitory government in 2001, and in 2002 assumed the role of Police Ombudsman (Defensora de la Policía).

From 2002 to 2005, she served as a member of the Organization of American States's Inter-American Commission on Human Rights (IACHR), serving as rapporteur on child rights and later on women's rights, as Second Vice President of the Commission in 2004, and First Vice President in 2005. She took part in IACHR human rights and conflict missions in Colombia and Guatemala.

In the Peruvian general election of 2006, Villarán was presidential candidate for Concertación Descentralista, an alliance of the PDS and the Peruvian Humanist Movement. She was one of three female candidates along with Lourdes Flores and Martha Chávez, and came in seventh place with 0.62% of the vote.

In 2008, she was elected to the United Nations Committee on the Rights of the Child.

== 2010 Lima mayoral campaign ==
In 2009 she announced her candidacy for Mayor of Lima as leader of the Social Force Decentralisation Party (FS), which had been formed by the merger of the PDS and eight other centre-left parties in October 2007. Her candidature was backed by three smaller centre-left groups.

After a slow start to her campaign, in the final weeks Villarán overtook the longtime favourite Lourdes Flores to win with 1,743,712 votes, representing 38.393% of the valid votes. She assumed office on January 1, 2011.

== 2013 recall attempt and 2014 Lima mayoral campaign ==
A referendum was held on March 17, 2013 to recall her from office, seemingly following her attempt to use the 1994 "law [allowing recall referendums] and crack down on corruption.". She survived the recall but 20 members - including spokesperson against her recall Marisa Glave - of the city council were recalled. However, she was defeated in her 2014 re-election bid by former mayor Luis Castañeda Lossio, who took office on January 1, 2015.

== Publications ==
- Picking Up the Pieces: Corruption and Democracy in Peru, with Nick Caistor, (London : Latinamerica Bureau) 2006. ISBN 1-899365-75-3.

Preceded by Marco Parra Sánchez	Mayor of Lima; January 1, 2011 – December 31, 2014	Succeeded by Luis Castañeda Lossio
Preceded by Luisa María Cuculiza	Minister of Women and Social Development; November 22, 2000 – July 28, 2001	Succeeded by Cecilia Blondet
