= Peruvian Humanist Party =

Political party in Peru

Peruvian Humanist Party Partido Humanista Peruano
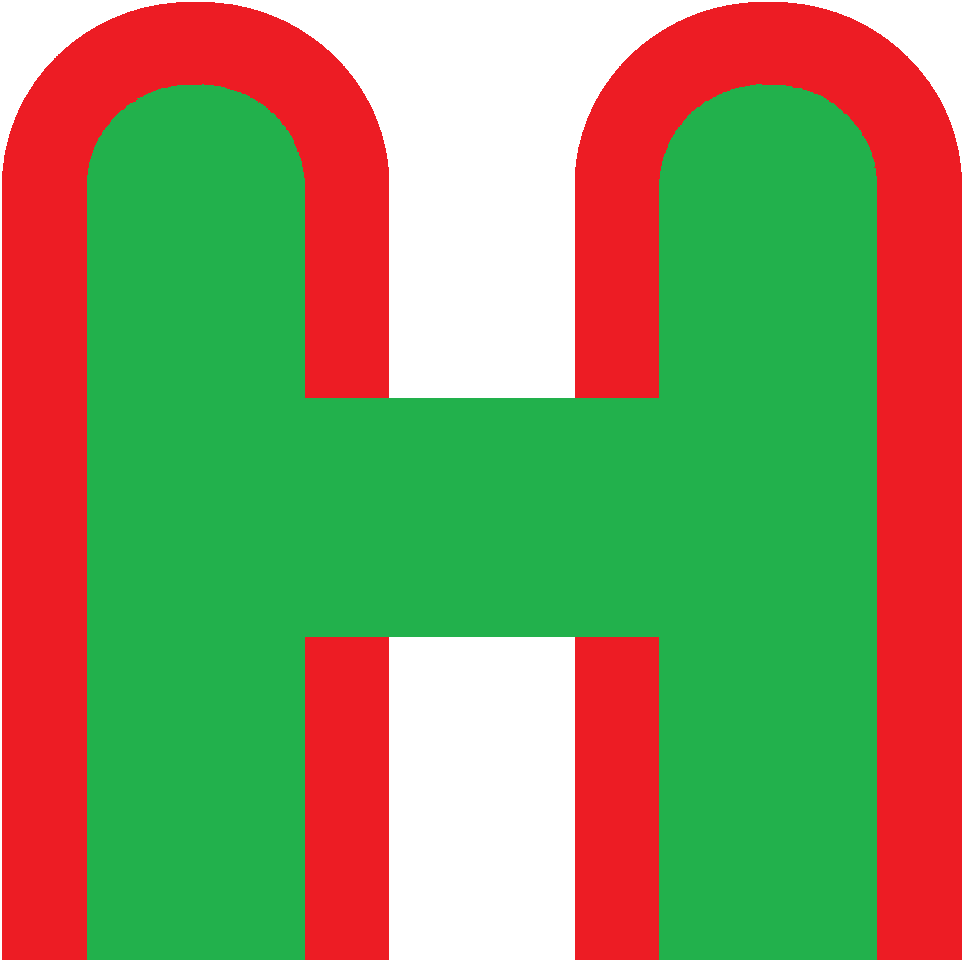
- Abbreviation: PHP
- Leader: Yehude Simon
- Founded: 2001
- Ideology: Humanism; Developmentalism
- Political position: Centre-left
- National affiliation: Together for Peru (2017–2021)
- Regional affiliation: COPPPAL; São Paulo Forum

Website
- www.partidohumanista.org.pe

The Peruvian Humanist Party (Spanish: Partido Humanista Peruano, PHP), formerly the Peruvian Humanist Movement Party, is a humanist political party in Peru, and a former member of the Decentralization Coalition together with the Partido por la Democracia Social - Compromiso Perú. The PMHP won the regional elections of 2002 for the northern region of Lambayeque.

In 2008, Yehude Simon of PMHP became Prime Minister of Peru under Alan García. He resigned less than a year later.

For the 2011 Peruvian general election the party was allied with the Alliance for the Great Change of Pedro Pablo Kuczynski, that won 12 seats in Congress, making Yehude Simon a congressman for Lambayeque Region.

From 2017 to 2021, the party was a member of the Together for Peru coalition. Its party registration was used in order to formalize the union by changing the party's name to the coalition's name. The coalition is composed by the Peruvian Communist Party, the Decentralist Social Force Party, the Communist Party of Peru – Red Fatherland, Citizens for Change, Únete por otra Democracia, and Movement Towards Socialism. At the legislative elections held on 26 January 2020, the Humanist Party, which was part of the Together for Peru coalition won 4.8% of the popular vote but no seats in the Congress of the Republic. Although, the first projections gave the coalition approximately 5.0% within the margin of error, the party failed to get past the electoral threshold in order to attain representation.

The party is a member of the Permanent Conference of Political Parties of Latin America and the Caribbean (COPPPAL).

== Electoral history ==
=== Presidential election ===
Year	Candidate	Coalition	Votes	Percentage	Outcome
2006	Susana Villarán	Decentralization Coalition PDS-PHP	76 106	0.62	7th
2011	Pedro Pablo Kuczynski	Alliance for the Great Change APP-PPC-RN-PHP	2 711 450	18.51	3rd
2016	Yehude Simon	Peruvian Humanist Party	Ticket withdrawn	N/A	N/A

=== Election to the Congress of the Republic ===
Election	Votes	%	Number of seats	▲/▼	Position
2006	91 784	0.9% as part of the Decentralization Coalition	0 / 120	Steady	N/A
2011	1 851 080	14.4% as part of the Alliance for the Great Change. Only 1 from Peruvian Humanist Party.	12 / 130	▲1	Minority
2016	List withdrawn	N/A	N/A	Steady	N/A
