= Augusto Weberbauer =

German naturalist, botanist and professor

Augusto Weberbauer (birth name "August" – Breslau, 26 November 1871 – died in Lima, 1948) was a German naturalist, botanist and university professor. He conducted systematic exploration of Peru in search of new plant species. Weberbauer received his PhD in botany at the University of Breslau (1894), continued his studies in natural sciences at universities in Heidelberg and Berlin. He taught at the University of Breslau. He was commissioned by the Royal Academy of Sciences in Berlin to develop botanical research in Peru (1901). In 1905, he delivered 5200 species of seagrass which he had collected in Peru. The Peruvian government hired him to develop the Zoo and Botanical Garden in 1908. He received the degree of Doctor of Science at the National University of San Marcos in 1922. He taught here as professor of pharmaceutical chemistry (1923–48) and Systematic Botany (1925–48), as well as directing the Botany Seminar (1935–1948). The wild potato species, S. neoweberbaueri, collected by Weberbauer on Morro Solar, was named by Ludwig Wittmack in 1914.

He taught at the Deutsche Schule Lima Alexander von Humboldt.
